= 2015 Maya Awards =

Awards ceremony honouring the best Indonesian films of 2015

- 2015 Maya Awards logo
- Date: December 19, 2015
- Location: Soehanna Hall, SCBD, South Jakarta
- Country: Indonesia
- Most awards: Guru Bangsa: Tjokroaminoto (8)
- Most nominations: Guru Bangsa: Tjokroaminoto (14)

The 2015 Maya Awards (Indonesian: Piala Maya 2015) is an award ceremony honoring the best Indonesian films of 2015. The ceremony was held at Soehanna Hall, SCBD, South Jakarta, on December 19, 2015. The award ceremony is held in collaboration with the SAE Institute and Kineria.com, with the 2015 theme being "Imajinasia".

Being nominated to 14 times, Guru Bangsa: Tjokroaminoto also was biggest winner film for taking home eight trophy awards, behind Filosofi Kopi and Nada Untuk Asa were received double awards.

== Nomination process ==
A committee of 350 independent judges makes selections from Indonesian films released in the period from December 1, 2014, to November 30, 2015. Nominations were announced on December 1, 2015. Public nominations were also made in several categories such as Short Film, Animation, and Documentary. In October and November, a selection of nominated films were screened at Film Week events at several universities.

== Winners and nominees ==
Winners are listed first and signified in bold letters. Nominees for special awards, Iqbal Rais Award (Young Director), were announced on December 9, 2015, via Twitter official account.

=== Technical ===
Best Feature Film	Best Director
Guru Bangsa: Tjokroaminoto; 3; Filosofi Kopi; Kapan Kawin?; Mencari Hilal; Pendekar Tongkat Emas; Siti; Toba Dreams	Garin Nugroho – Guru Bangsa: Tjokroaminoto; Angga Dwimas Sasongko – Filosofi Kopi; Anggy Umbara – 3; Benni Setiawan – Toba Dreams; Ismail Basbeth – Mencari Hilal
Best Original Screenplay	Best Adapted Screenplay
Kapan Kawin? – Monty Tiwa, Robert Ronny and Ody C. Harahap; 3 – Bounty Umbara, Anggy Umbara and Fajar Umbara; Guru Bangsa: Tjokroaminoto – Ari Syarif and Erik Supit; Mencari Hilal – Salman Aristo, Bagus Bramanti and Ismail Basbeth; Nada Untuk Asa – Charles Gozali	Filosofi Kopi – Jenny Jusuf; Bulan Diatas Kuburan – Dirmawan Hatta; Toba Dreams – Benni Setiawan
Best Camera System	Best Editing
Guru Bangsa: Tjokroaminoto – Ipung Rachmat Syaiful; Bidadari Terakhir – Memet Nakes; Filosofi Kopi – Robie Taswin; Pendekar Tongkat Emas – Gunnar Nimpuno; Supernova: Ksatria, Putri, & Bintang Jatuh – Yudi Datau	3 – Bounty Umbara; Filosofi Kopi – Ahsan Andrian; Guru Bangsa: Tjokroaminoto – Wawan I. Wibowo; Hijab – Wawan I. Wibowo; Mencari Hilal – Wawan I. Wibowo
Best Art Direction	Best Special Effects
Guru Bangsa: Tjokroaminoto – Allan Sebastian; Comic 8: Casino Kings Part 1 – Dicky Kadarhariyawan; Love and Faith – Roma Rombeng; Pendekar Tongkat Emas – Eros Eflin; Supernova: Ksatria, Putri, & Bintang Jatuh – Vida Sylvia	Comic 8: Casino Kings Part 1 – Epics FX Studios; 3 – Tommy Sukowati, Benny and Kuntz; Guru Bangsa: Tjokroaminoto – Satria Bayangkara; Pendekar Tongkat Emas – Fixit Works; Supernova: Ksatria, Putri, & Bintang Jatuh – Fixit Works
Best Film Score	Best Sound Design
Guru Bangsa: Tjokroaminoto – Andi Rianto; Bulan Diatas Kuburan – Willy Haryadi and Viky Sianipar; Filosofi Kopi – McAnderson; Pendekar Tongkat Emas – Erwin Gutawa; Supernova: Ksatria, Putri, & Bintang Jatuh – Stevesmith Music Production	Guru Bangsa: Tjokroaminoto – Satrio Budiono and Trisno; 3 – Khikmawan Santosa and Novi DRN; Badoet – Khikmawan Santosa; Di Balik 98 – Khikmawan Santosa and Mohamad Ikhsan Sungkar; Pendekar Tongkat Emas – Satrio Budiono and Yusuf Patawari
Best Costume Design	Best Makeup & Hairstyling
Guru Bangsa: Tjokroaminoto – Retno Ratih Damayanti; Comic 8: Casino Kings Part 1 – Aldie Harran, Upay, Quartini Sari and Amy Wirabudi; Love and Faith – Dara Asvia; Pendekar Tongkat Emas – Chitra Subijakto; The Wedding and Bebek Betutu – Isabelle Patrice and Tania Suprapto	Guru Bangsa: Tjokroaminoto – Didin Syamsudin; Badoet – Aktris Handradjasa; Love and Faith – Tini Ridayanti; Pendekar Tongkat Emas – Jerry Octavianus; Tuyul Part 1 – Lechi Prasetya, Reza Pramez and Febyanto
Best Poster Design	Best Theme Song
Badoet – Hans Nio; 3 – Thovfa EndOneStuff; Another Trip to the Moon – Gertjan Zuilhof and Zulfan Riyadi; Bidadari Terakhir – Andhika Nugraha and Andira Pramanta; The Wedding and Bebek Betutu – Mayumi Haryoto	"Let It Be My Way" composed by Melly Goeslaw, performed by Andien – Hijab; "Mencari Hilal" composed by SM Damar Paunuluh, Noe Letto and Charlie Melilala, performed by SM Damar Paunuluh – Mencari Hilal; "Seluas Itu" composed and performed by Pongki Barata – Nada Untuk Asa; "Semesta" composed by Widi Puradireja, performed by Maliq & D'Essentials – Filosofi Kopi; "Turning Back to You" composed by Adis Putra and Mentari, performed by Citra Scholastika – 3 Dara

=== Performers ===
Best Actor in a Leading Role	Best Actress in a Leading Role
Deddy Sutomo – Mencari Hilal; Chicco Jerikho – Filosofi Kopi; Reza Rahadian – Guru Bangsa: Tjokroaminoto; Rio Dewanto – Love and Faith; Vino G. Bastian – Toba Dreams	Marsha Timothy – Nada Untuk Asa; Adinia Wirasti – Kapan Kawin?; Dian Sastrowardoyo – 7/24; Laudya Cynthia Bella – Surga Yang Tak Dirindukan; Tutie Kirana – About a Woman
Best Actor in a Supporting Role	Best Actress in a Supporting role
Donny Damara – 2014; Adi Kurdi – Kapan Kawin?; Mathias Muchus – Toba Dreams; Oka Antara – Mencari Hilal; Tio Pakusadewo – Bulan Diatas Kuburan	Ria Irawan – Bulan Diatas Kuburan; Atiqah Hasiholan – 2014; Christine Hakim – Pendekar Tongkat Emas; Jajang C. Noer – Toba Dreams; Prisia Nasution – Comic 8: Casino Kings Part 1
Best New Actor	Tuti Indra Malaon Awards for Best New Actress
Morgan Oey – Assalamualaikum Beijing; Andre Hehanussa – Bulan Diatas Kuburan; Boris Bokir – Toba Dreams; Gogot Suryanto – Jenderal Soedirman; Rizky Nazar – 2014	Whulandary Herman – Bidadari Terakhir; Paula Verhoeven – Supernova: Ksatria, Putri, & Bintang Jatuh; Putri Ayudya – Guru Bangsa: Tjokroaminoto; Salvita Decorte – Lily: Bunga Terakhirku; Sekar Sari – Siti
Best Young Performer	Arifin C. Noer Awards for Non-Effectively Brief Appearance
Aria Kusumah – Pendekar Tongkat Emas; Badra Andhipani Jagad – Ayat-Ayat Adinda; Bintang Timur Widodo – Siti; Khadijah Banderas – Wewe; Tissa Biani Azahra – Ayat-Ayat Adinda	Wulan Guritno – Nada Untuk Asa; Henky Solaiman – 7/24; Sophia Latjuba – Comic 8: Casino Kings Part 1; Tanta Ginting – 3; Tumini – Guru Bangsa: Tjokroaminoto

=== Competition ===
Best Short Film
Lemantun – Wregas Bhanuteja; Friend – Yandy Laurens; Gula-Gula Usia – Ninndi Raras; Jujur Aja! – Nandina Prajanto; Potret – Nur Wulandari; Vampire – Fitro Dizianto; When the Sea Feels Lonely – Wimar Herdanto; Wong Tjilik – Wisnu Dewa Broto
Best Documentary Film	Best Animated Film
Jalan Pulang – Ignasius L.W. Somalinggi; Di Atas Kaki Sendiri – Abdul Razzaq and Sahree Ramadhan; Hari Yang Lain untuk Bakka' Sendana – N. Priharwanto; Iblis Jalanan – Salman Farizi; Salam dari Anak-Anak Tergenang – Gilang Bayu Santoso	Djakarta-00 – Galang Ekaputra Larope; Heru Show – Made Dimas Wirawan; Parte – Bobby Fernando; Pret – Firman Widyasmara; Wachtenstaad – Fajar Ramayel
Best Regional Film	Best Film Review
Silet di Antara Digoel Papua – Henry W. Muabuay (Papua); Cakra Buana – Massimo Burhanuddin (Jawa Barat); Di Bawah Langit Jayapura – Ipong Wijaya (Papua)	Arul Fittron, for "Refleksi dalam Secangkir Kopi" – Filosofi Kopi; Teguh Santoso, for "Di Balik Stereotipe Wanita Jawa" – Siti; Diaksa Adhistira, for "Dunia Persilatan yang Indah" – Pendekar Tongkat Emas; Shandy Gasella, for "Hidup Normal dan Tegar Bersama HIV/AIDS" – Nada Untuk Asa; Elbert Reyner, for "Petualangan Spiritual Mencari Kedamaian" – Mencari Hilal
Best DVD Collection
Selamat Pagi, Malam; Assalamualaikum Beijing + Haji Backpacker (pack); Cahaya Dari Timur: Beta Maluku; Sokola Rimba; Tabula Rasa

=== Special awards ===
Iqbal Rais Award (Special Awards for Young Director)	Profession Loyalty Award
Hariwicahyo Utomo – Cerita Tentang Cak Munir (Documentary film); Dmaz Brodjonegoro – Jentera (Short film); Fajar Ramayel – Wachtenstaad (Animation film); Fitro Dizianto – Vampire (Short film); Wisnu Dewa Broto – Wong Tjilik (Short film)	Hendrick Gozali

== Multiple wins and nominations ==
The following films received multiple awards:

Film	Wins
Guru Bangsa: Tjokroaminoto	8
Filosofi Kopi; Nada Untuk Asa	2

The following films receive multiple nominations:

Film	Nominations
Guru Bangsa: Tjokroaminoto	14
Pendekar Tongkat Emas	11
Filosofi Kopi	9
3 Mencari Hilal	8
Toba Dreams	7
Nada Untuk Asa; Bulan Diatas Kuburan; Comic 8: Casino Kings Part 1 Supernova: Kstaria, Putri dan Bintang Jatuh	5
Kapan Kawin? Love and Faith	4
2014; Siti; Bidadari Terakhir	3
7/24; Assalamualaikum Beijing; Ayat-Ayat Adinda; Badoet; Hijab; The Wedding and Bebek Betutu	2
