= 2015 Indonesian Film Festival =

2015 film award ceremony

Indonesian Film Festival
- Date: 23 November 2015
- Site: Indonesia Convention Exhibition, South Tangerang, Banten, Indonesia
- Hosted by: Sarah Sechan
- Official website: Official website

Highlights
- Best Picture: Siti
- Most awards: A Copy of My Mind; Guru Bangsa: Tjokroaminoto; Siti (3)
- Most nominations: Guru Bangsa: Tjokroaminoto (8)

Television coverage
- Network: NET.

The 35th Indonesian Film Festival ceremony took place on 23 November 2015 at the Indonesia Convention Exhibition, South Tangerang, Indonesia, to honor the achievement in Indonesian cinema of 2015. The ceremony was held in tribute to Indonesian director Teguh Karya, therefore it was held in Karya's birth province, Banten. It was broadcast on NET. for the first time and hosted by television presenter Sarah Sechan.

Drama film Siti won the Best Picture, alongside two other awards. It tied with A Copy of My Mind and Guru Bangsa: Tjokroaminoto. Other winners include Filosofi Kopi and The Golden Cane Warrior with two, The Crescent Moon, The Fox Exploits the Tiger's Might, GWK, Mendadak Caleg, Supernova, Tino Sidin Sang Guru Gambar, and Toba Dreams with one. Cinematographer and Karya's frequent collaborator George Kamarullah was honored with the Lifetime Achievement Award.

== Winners and nominations ==
The nominations were announced on 12 November 2015 at Plaza Indonesia, Central Jakarta. Guru Bangsa: Tjokroaminoto received the most nominations with eight, followed by A Copy of My Mind and The Crescent Moon with seven.

Winners are listed first, highlighted in boldface, and indicated with a double dagger (‡).

**Best Picture**: **Siti – Ifa Isfansyah**‡; A Copy of My Mind – Tia Hasibuan, Uwie Balfas, and Jeong Tae-sung; The Crescent Moon – Raam Punjabi, Hanung Bramantyo, Putut Widjanarko, and Salman Aristo; Guru Bangsa: Tjokroaminoto – Christine Hakim, Dewi Umaya Rachman, Sabrang Mowo Damar Panuluh, and Didi Petet; Toba Dreams – Rizaludin Kurniawan	**Best Director**: **Joko Anwar – A Copy of My Mind**‡; Ismail Basbeth – The Crescent Moon; Eddie Cahyono – Siti; Angga Dwimas Sasongko – Filosofi Kopi; Benni Setiawan – Toba Dreams
**Best Actor**: **Deddy Sutomo – The Crescent Moon as Mahmud**‡; Vino G. Bastian – Toba Dreams as Ronggur; Rio Dewanto – Love and Faith as Kwee Tjie Hoei; Reza Rahadian – Guru Bangsa: Tjokroaminoto as Oemar Said Tjokroaminoto; Reza Rahadian – When Will You Get Married? as Satrio	**Best Actress**: **Tara Basro – A Copy of My Mind as Sari**‡; Chelsea Islan – Behind 98 as Diana; Dewi Sandra – Air Mata Surga as Fisha; Marsha Timothy – Nada Untuk Asa as Nada; Adinia Wirasti – When Will You Get Married? as Dinda
**Best Supporting Actor**: **Mathias Muchus – Toba Dreams as T. B. Silalahi**‡; Paul Agusta – A Copy of My Mind as Bandy; Tanta Ginting – 3: Alif Lam Mim as Tamtama; Adi Kurdi – When Will You Get Married? as Gatot; Slamet Rahardjo – Filosofi Kopi as Seno	**Best Supporting Actress**: **Christine Hakim – The Golden Cane Warrior as Tjempaka**‡; Wulan Guritno – Nada for Asa as Wanda; Ria Irawan – A Moon Hangs Above the Graveyard as Mirna; Prisia Nasution – Comic 8: Casino Kings Part 1 as Interpol Cynthia; Raline Shah – The Heaven None Missed as Mei Rose
**Best Original Screenplay**: **Siti – Eddie Cahyono**‡; 3: Alif Lam Mim – Anggy Umbara, Bounty Umbara, and Fajar Umbara; The Crescent Moon – Salman Aristo, Bagus Bramanti, and Ismail Basbeth; Guru Bangsa: Tjokroaminoto – Ari Syarif and Erik Supit; When Will You Get Married? – Monty Tiwa, Robert Ronny, and Ody C. Harahap	**Best Adapted Screenplay**: **Filosofi Kopi – Jenny Jusuf; based on the book by Dewi Lestari**‡; The Final Note – Johansyah Jumberan and Jay Sukmo; based on the novel by Sam Maulana; The Heaven None Missed – Alim Sudio and Bagus Bramanti; based on the novel by Asma Nadia; A Moon Hangs Above the Graveyard – Dirmawan Hatta; based on the 1973 film written by Asrul Sani and the poem "Malam Lebaran" by Sitor Situmorang; Toba Dreams – Benni Setiawan; based on the novel by T. B. Silalahi
**Best Documentary Feature**: **Mendadak Caleg – Dodi F.A.**‡; Elegi di Negeri Oepoli – Kompas TV; All About My Pregnancy – Supriyadi and Suprie Van Java	**Best Documentary Short Film**: **Tino Sidin: Sang Guru Gambar – Kiki Natez**‡; Nostalgia Senja – Fazhila Anandya; Pejuang dari Gua Purbakala – Muhammad Fahmi Iskandar and Nurtaqdir Anugrah; Salam dari Anak-anak Tergenang – Gilang Bayu Santoso; SRD
**Best Live Action Short Film**: **The Fox Exploits the Tiger's Might – Lucky Kuswandi, Meiske Taurisia, Edwin, and Tunggal Pawestri**‡; December – Sidharta Tata and Ignatius Dimas Yulianto; Kilau Kerikil – Iqbal Fadly and Michael Julius; Semalam Anak Kita Pulang – Adi Marsono and Kuntz Agus; Simbiosis – Wiranata Tanjaya	**Best Animated Short Film**: **GWK – Chandra Endropurto**‡; Djakarta 00 – Galang E. Larope; Kapur Ade – Firman Widyasmara; Parte – Bobby Fernando; Tendangan Halilintar – MD Animation
**Best Cinematography**: **Guru Bangsa: Tjokroaminoto – Ipung Rachmat Syaiful**‡; A Copy of My Mind – Ical Tanjung; Behind 98 – Yadi Sugandi and Muhammad Firdaus; Siti – Fauzi "Ujel" Bausadi; Supernova – Yudi Datau	**Best Film Editing**: **Filosofi Kopi – Ahsan Andrian**‡; Air Mata Surga – Sentot Sahid; Hijab – Wawan I. Wibowo and Cesa David Luckmansyah; The Crescent Moon – Wawan I. Wibowo; Supernova – Sastha Sunu and Kelvin Nugroho
**Best Original Score**: **Siti – Krisna Purna**‡; A Copy of My Mind – Aghi Narottama and Bemby Gusti; The Crescent Moon – Charlie Meliala; Love and Faith – Aksan Sjuman; A Moon Hangs Above the Graveyard – Viky Sianipar	**Best Sound**: **A Copy of My Mind – Khikmawan Santosa and Yusuf A. Patarwani**‡; 3: Alif Lam Mim – Khikmawan Santosa and Novi D. R. N.; The Golden Cane Warrior – Satrio Budiono and Yusuf A. Patawari; Guru Bangsa: Tjokroaminoto – Satrio Budiono and Trisno; Jenderal Soedirman – Satrio Budiono and Yusuf A. Patawari
**Best Visual Effects**: **Supernova – FIXIT Works**‡; 3: Alif Lam Mim – Sinergy Animation; Behind 98 – Raiyan Laksamana; Guru Bangsa: Tjokroaminoto – Satria Bhayangkara; Comic 8: Casino Kings Part 1 – Epics FX Studios	**Best Art Direction**: **Guru Bangsa: Tjokroaminoto – Allan Sebastian**‡; The Crescent Moon – Allan Sebastian; The Golden Cane Warrior – Eros Eflin; Supernova – Vida Sylvia; Toba Dreams – Oscart Firdaus
**Best Costume Design**: **Guru Bangsa: Tjokroaminoto – Retno Ratih Damayanti**‡; Behind 98 – Jeanne Elizabeth Fam; Filosofi Kopi – Anggia Kharisma; The Golden Cane Warrior – Chitra Subiyakto; The Wedding and Bebek Betutu – Isabelle Patrice and Tania Soeprapto	**Best Child Performer**: **Aria Kusumah – The Golden Cane Warrior as Angin**‡; Bima Azriel – 3: Alif Lam Mim as Gilang; Bima Azriel – Behind 98 as Gandung; Fatih Unru – Seputih Cinta Melati as Rian; Raihan Khan – Ada Surga di Rumahmu as little Ramadan
**Lifetime Achievement Award**: **George Kamarullah**‡

=== Films with multiple nominations and awards ===
Films that received multiple nominations
Nominations	Film
8	Guru Bangsa: Tjokroaminoto
7	A Copy of My Mind
7	The Crescent Moon
6	Toba Dreams
5	3: Alif Lam Mim
5	Behind 98
5	Filosofi Kopi
5	The Golden Cane Warrior
5	Siti
4	Supernova
4	When Will You Get Married?
3	A Moon Hangs Above the Graveyard
2	Air Mata Surga
2	Comic 8: Casino Kings Part 1
2	The Heaven None Missed
2	Love and Faith
2	Nada for Asa

Films that received multiple awards
Awards	Film
3	A Copy of My Mind
3	Guru Bangsa: Tjokroaminoto
3	Siti
2	Filosofi Kopi
2	Guru Bangsa: Tjokroaminoto
