= 2016 Indonesian Movie Actors Awards =

Film industry award ceremony

10th Annual Indonesian Movie Actor Awards
- Date: May 30, 2016
- Location: Studio 14 RCTI, West Jakarta
- Country: Indonesia
- Hosted by: Daniel Mananta; Nirina Zubir

Television/radio coverage
- Network: RCTI

The 10th Annual Indonesian Movie Actor Awards was an awards ceremony held on May 30, 2016, at the Studio 14 RCTI, West Jakarta. The show was hosted by Daniel Mananta and Nirina Zubir on awarding night, and Tara Budiman and Ayushita on red carpet. Nominations in the category of "Favorite" were chosen by members of the public via SMS, and in the category of "Best" by an appointed jury.

Mencari Hilal led the nominations with nine, with 3, A Copy of My Mind, Guru Bangsa: Tjokroaminoto, Surat Dari Praha, and Toba Dreams followed with six nominations each. In the night ceremonies, Mencari Hilal was the biggest winner, receiving four awards and Toba Dreams each won two awards.

A special award, Lifetime Achievement Award was presented to Widyawati for her outstanding contribution to Indonesian cinema industry.

In 2016, the edition of this ceremony awards has winning the award for Favorite Special Events at the 19th Annual Panasonic Gobel Awards.

== Judges ==
| Name | Profession |
|---|---|
| Aditya Gumay | Director |
| Marcella Zalianty | Actress |
| Lukman Sardi | Actor |
| Salman Aristo | Scriptwriter |
| Ratna Riantiarno | Actress |
| Sheila Timothy | President of Indonesian Film Producer Association (APFI) |

== Performers ==
| Artist(s) | Song(s) |
Main show
| Arie Untung; Tanta Ginting | Parody' perform |
| Bunga Citra Lestari | "Aku Bisa Apa" |
| Andien; Virzha; Ario Bayu | "Ratusan Purnama" |
| Maliq & D'Essentials | "Semesta" |
| Ario Bayu; Andien | "Suara Hati Seorang Kekasih" |
| Kunto Aji; Maliq & D'Essentials | "Judi" |

== Presenter ==
- Chicco Jerikho and Chelsea Islan – Presented Best Children Role
- Dewi Sandra and Zaskia Adya Mecca – Presented Best Newcomer Actor/Actress
- Dimas Anggara and Prisia Nasution – Presented Favorite Newcomer Actor/Actress
- Hannah Al Rashid and Melayu Nicole Hall – Presented Favorite Supporting Actor
- Arifin Putra and Julie Estelle – Presented Best Supporting Actor
- Dion Wiyoko and Hamish Daud – Presented Favorite Supporting Actress
- Ario Bayu and Fachri Albar – Presented Best Supporting Actress
- Tanta Ginting and Tora Sudiro – Presented Best Chemistry
- Vino G. Bastian – Presented Favorite Actress
- Marsha Timothy – Presented Favorite Actor
- Ray Sahetapy and Reza Rahadian – Presented Lifetime Achievement Award
- Bunga Citra Lestari – Presented Best Actress
- Joe Taslim and Tara Basro – Presented Best Actor
- Adinia Wirasti and Dian Sastrowardoyo – Presented Favorite Film
- Lukman Sardi and Sheila Timothy – Presented Best Ensemble

== Winners and nominees ==
=== Best ===
Winners are listed first and highlighted in boldface.

| Best Actor | Best Actress |
|---|---|
| **Deddy Sutomo – Mencari Hilal**; Tio Pakusadewo – Surat Dari Praha; Chicco Jerikho – Aach... Aku Jatuh Cinta!; Reza Rahadian – Guru Bangsa: Tjokroaminoto; Vino G. Bastian – Toba Dreams | **Sha Ine Febriyanti – Nay**; Julie Estelle – Surat Dari Praha; Tara Basro – A Copy of My Mind; Lala Karmela – Ngenest; Prisia Nasution – Comic 8: Casino Kings Part 1 |
| Best Supporting Actor | Best Supporting Actress |
| **Oka Antara – Mencari Hilal**; Haydar Hafiz – Siti; Paul Augusta – A Copy of My Mind; Tanta Ginting – 3; Slamet Rahardjo – Filosofi Kopi | **Ria Irawan – Bulan Diatas Kuburan**; Christine Hakim – Guru Bangsa: Tjokroaminoto; Tika Bravani – 3; Erythrina Baskoro – Mencari Hilal; Jajang C. Noer – Toba Dreams |
| Best Newcomer Actor/Actress | Best Children Role |
| **Sekar Sari – Siti**; Andre Hehanusa – Bulan Diatas Kuburan; Kevin Anggara – Ngenest; Hany Valery – Jingga; Nina Septiani – Ada Surga di Rumahmu | **Raihan Khan – Ada Surga di Rumahmu**; Sandrinna Michelle – Surga Yang Tak Dirindukan; Fadhel Muhammad Rayhan – Toba Dreams; Bima Azriel – 3 |
| Best Chemistry | Best Ensemble |
| **Deddy Sutomo and Oka Antara – Mencari Hilal**; Chicco Jerikho and Tara Basro – A Copy of My Mind; Chicco Jerikho and Rio Dewanto – Filosofi Kopi; Tio Pakusadewo and Julie Estelle – Surat Dari Praha; Tio Pakusadewo and Tatjana Saphira – I Am Hope | **Garin Nugroho – Guru Bangsa: Tjokroaminoto**; Ismail Isbeth – Mencari Hilal; Edo Wahyu Fahreza Sitanggang – Bulan Diatas Kuburan; Anggy Umbara – 3; Angga Dwimas Sasongko – Filosofi Kopi |

=== Favorite ===
Winners are listed first and highlighted in boldface.

| Favorite Actor | Favorite Actress |
|---|---|
| **Vino G. Bastian – Toba Dreams**; Deddy Sutomo – Mencari Hilal; Tio Pakusadewo – Surat Dari Praha; Chicco Jerikho – Aach... Aku Jatuh Cinta!; Reza Rahadian – Guru Bangsa: Tjokroaminoto | **Julie Estelle – Surat Dari Praha**; Sha Ine Febriyanti – Nay; Tara Basro – A Copy of My Mind; Lala Karmela – Ngenest; Prisia Nasution – Comic 8: Casino Kings Part 1 |
| Favorite Supporting Actor | Favorite Supporting Actress |
| **Tanta Ginting – 3**; Oka Antara – Mencari Hilal; Haydar Hafiz – Siti; Paul Augusta – A Copy of My Mind; Slamet Rahardjo – Filosofi Kopi | **Erythrina Baskoro – Mencari Hilal**; Christine Hakim – Guru Bangsa: Tjokroaminoto; Tika Bravani – 3; Ria Irawan – Bulan Diatas Kuburan; Jajang C. Noer – Toba Dreams |
| Favorite Newcomer Actor/Actress | Favorite Film |
| **Kevin Anggara – Ngenest (Newcomer Actor)**; **Jolene Marie Rotinsulu – I am Hope (Newcomer Actress)**; Andre Hehanusa – Bulan Diatas Kuburan; Hany Valery – Jingga; Nina Septiani – Ada Surga di Rumahmu; Sekar Sari – Siti | **Toba Dreams**; Negeri Van Oranje; Surat Dari Praha; Ngenest; Mencari Hilal; Guru Bangsa: Tjokroaminoto; A Copy of My Mind; Siti; Filosofi Kopi; Surga Yang Tak Dirindukan |

Lifetime Achievement Award
**Widyawati**

== Film with most nominations and awards ==
=== Most nominations ===
The following film received most nominations:

| Nominations | Film |
|---|---|
| 9 | Mencari Hilal |
| 6 | 3 |
| 6 | A Copy of My Mind |
| 6 | Guru Bangsa: Tjokroaminoto |
| 6 | Surat Dari Praha |
| 6 | Toba Dreams |
| 5 | Bulan Diatas Kuburan |
| 5 | Filosofi Kopi |
| 5 | Ngenest |
| 5 | Siti |
| 3 | Ada Surga di Rumahmu |
| 2 | Aach... Aku Jatuh Cinta! |
| 2 | Jingga |
| 2 | Nay |
| 2 | Surga Yang Tak Dirindukan |

=== Most wins ===
The following film received most nominations:

| Awards | Film |
|---|---|
| 4 | Mencari Hilal |
| 2 | Toba Dreams |

== Awards and nominations ==
| Year | Awards | Category | Result |
|---|---|---|---|
| 2016 | Panasonic Gobel Awards | Favorite Special Events | Won |
