= 2015 Indonesian Movie Awards =

Film industry award ceremony

9th Annual Indonesian Movie Awards
- Date: May 18, 2015
- Location: Balai Sarbini, South Jakarta
- Country: Indonesia
- Hosted by: Nirina Zubir; Ringgo Agus Rahman; Dennis Adhiswara

Television/radio coverage
- Network: RCTI

The 9th Annual Indonesian Movie Awards was an awards ceremony held on May 18, 2015, at the Balai Sarbini, South Jakarta. The show was hosted by Nirina Zubir, Ringgo Agus Rahman, and Dennis Adhiswara. Nominations in the category of "Favorite" were chosen by members of the public via SMS, and in the category of "Best" by an appointed jury. Guest stars who performed at the event include Ridho Rhoma, Ayu Ting Ting, Mieke Wijaya, Willy Dozan, Chelsea Islan, Tatjana Saphira, Vincent Rompies, and Desta.

Nada Untuk Asa led the nominations with eight, with Cahaya Dari Timur: Beta Maluku followed with seven nominations and Di Balik 98 with six nominations. Cahaya Dari Timur: Beta Maluku was the biggest winner with receiving three golden film trophy awards. Other winners Di Balik 98 and Nada Untuk Asa won two trophy awards apiece.

For their work in Indonesian cinema, a Lifetime Achievement Award was presented to Mieke Wijaya and a Special Award to Alex Komang.

== Winners and nominees ==
=== Best ===
Winners are listed first and highlighted in boldface.

Best Actor	Best Actress
**Chicco Jerikho** **– Cahaya Dari Timur: Beta Maluku**; Abimana Aryasatya – Haji Backpacker; Alfie Alfandy – Hijrah Cinta; Reza Rahadian – Strawberry Surprise; Alex Komang – Sebelum Pagi Terulang Kembali	**Marsha Timothy – Nada Untuk Asa**; Atiqah Hasiholan – 3 Nafas Likas; Acha Septriasa – Nada Untuk Asa; Dian Sastrowardoyo – 7 Hari 24 Jam; Chelsea Islan – Merry Riana: Mimpi Sejuta Dolar
Best Supporting Actor	Best Supporting Actress
**Arifin Putra – The Raid: Berandal**; Donny Alamsyah – The Raid: Berandal; Mathias Muchus – Nada Untuk Asa; Teuku Rifnu Wikana – Di Balik 98; Yayu Unru – Tabula Rasa	**Laura Basuki – Haji Backpacker**; Christine Hakim – Pendekar Tongkat Emas; Jajang C. Noer – Cahaya Dari Timur: Beta Maluku; Marissa Anita – Selamat Pagi, Malam; Ririn Ekawati – Di Balik 98
Best Newcomer Actor/Actress	Best Chemistry
**Bebeto Leutually – Cahaya Dari Timur: Beta Maluku**; Jimmy Kobogau – Tabula Rasa; HB Naveen – Haji Backpacker; Sumarlin Beta – Garuda 19; Adila Fitri – My Idiot Brother	**Dian Sastrowardoyo and Lukman Sardi – 7 Hari 24 Jam**; Acha Septriasa and Abimana Aryasatya – 99 Cahaya Dilangit Eropa Part 2; Dion Wiyoko and Chelsea Islan – Merry Riana: Mimpi Sejuta Dolar; Adinia Wirasti and Marissa Anita – Selamat Pagi, Malam; Reza Rahadian and Acha Septriasa – Strawberry Surprise
Special Award: Best Children Role
**Tissa Biani – 3 Nafas Likas**; Aria Kusumah – Pendekar Tongkat Emas; Bima Azriel – Sepatu Dahlan; Bima Azriel – Di Balik 98; Mallaki Gruno – Nada Untuk Asa

=== Favorite ===
Winners are listed first and highlighted in boldface.

Favorite Actor	Favorite Actress
**Chicco Jerikho** **– Cahaya Dari Timur: Beta Maluku**; Abimana Aryasatya – Haji Backpacker; Alfie Alfandy – Hijrah Cinta; Reza Rahadian – Strawberry Surprise; Alex Komang – Sebelum Pagi Terulang Kembali	**Marsha Timothy – Nada Untuk Asa**; Atiqah Hasiholan – 3 Nafas Likas; Acha Septriasa – Nada Untuk Asa; Dian Sastrowardoyo – 7 Hari 24 Jam; Chelsea Islan – Merry Riana: Mimpi Sejuta Dolar
Favorite Newcomer Actor/Actress	Favorite Soundtrack
**Sumarlin Beta – Garuda 19**; Jimmy Kobogau – Tabula Rasa; HB Naveen – Haji Backpacker; Bebeto Leutually – Cahaya Dari Timur: Beta Maluku; Adila Fitri – My Idiot Brother	**"Indonesia Negeri Kita Bersama" performed by Angel Pieters – Di Balik 98**; "Tinggikan" performed by Glenn Fredly – Cahaya Dari Timur: Beta Maluku; "Di Balik Pintu Istana" performed by Saint Loco – Di Balik 98; "Fly Me Eagle" performed by Anggun – Pendekar Tongkat Emas; "Immortal Love Song" performed by MahaDewa – Runaway; "Seluas Itu" performed by Pongki Barata – Nada Untuk Asa
Favorite Film
**Di Balik 98**; Cahaya Dari Timur: Beta Maluku; 7 Hari 24 Jam; 3 Nafas Likas; Merry Riana: Mimpi Sejuta Dolar; Pendekar Tongkat Emas; 99 Cahaya di Langit Eropa Part 2; Strawberry Surprise; Nada Untuk Asa; The Raid: Berandal

Lifetime Achievement Award
**Mieke Wijaya**

Special Award
**Alex Komang**

== Film with most nominations and awards ==
=== Most nominations ===
The following film received most nominations:

Nominations	Film
8	Nada Untuk Asa
7	Cahaya Dari Timur: Beta Maluku
6	Di Balik 98
5	Haji Backpacker
4	7 Hari 24 Jam
4	Merry Riana: Mimpi Sejuta Dolar
4	Strawberry Surprise
4	Pendekar Tongkat Emas
3	3 Nafas Likas
3	The Raid: Berandal
3	Tabula Rasa
2	99 Cahaya Dilangit Eropa Part 2
2	Garuda 19
2	Hijrah Cinta
2	My Idiot Brother
2	Sebelum Pagi Terulang Kembali
2	Selamat Pagi, Malam

=== Most wins ===
The following film received most nominations:

Awards	Film
3	Cahaya Dari Timur: Beta Maluku
2	Di Balik 98
2	Nada Untuk Asa
