= Cinta Tanpa Karena =

Indonesian television action drama series

- Genre: Melodrama; Romance; Action; Revenge
- Written by: Almira Nirmala
- Screenplay by: Oka Aurora; Adreena Diva; Armila Nirmala; Sadia Senjana
- Directed by: Rudi Aryanto
- Starring: Ochi Rosdiana; Amanda Manopo; Achmad Megantara; Reuben Elishama; Della Puspita; Steffi Zamora; Rommy Sulastyo; Sutan Simatupang; Raquel Katie; Denny Weller; Ikhsan Saleh; Malida Dinda; Narafa Azizah; Angga Putra; Kris Anjar; Rayhan Rashid; Erma Zarina; Jihan Lifa; Regina Alya; Sendy Taroreh; Key Williams; Yessi Kenyang; Elizabeth Christine; Billy Boedjanger; Alfie Alfandy; Rachquel Nesia; Adrian Aliman; Hamka Siregar
- Theme music composer: Anneth Delliecia
- Opening theme: "Mungkin Hari Ini Esok Atau Nanti" by Anneth Delliecia
- Ending theme: "Mungkin Hari Ini Esok Atau Nanti" by Anneth Delliecia
- Composer: Joseph S. Djafar
- Country of origin: Indonesia
- Original language: Indonesian
- No. of seasons: 1
- No. of episodes: 463

Production
- Executive producers: Filriady Kusmara; Rista Ferina; Andre Forester
- Producers: M. Abul Laits; Andes Herjadi; Hesti Yudiarti
- Cinematography: Turpin Sihombing
- Editors: Andrie Kurniawan; Sujana Teja; Hasbi Maftuh; Hasjim Noor Afrijanie; Jefri Sitanggang; Fahrul Cece; Roby Sunjaya; Sunarya Ujang; Wenny Sabrina
- Camera setup: Multi-camera
- Production company: MNC Pictures

Original release
- Network: RCTI
- Release: 15 June 2023 – 9 June 2024

Cinta Tanpa Karena is an Indonesian television action drama series that premiered on 15 June 2023 on RCTI and streams on Vision+. It stars Ochi Rosdiana, Amanda Manopo, and Achmad Megantara.

== Plot ==
Dipta is a member of a special unit who has a beautiful girlfriend named Nuna. Their love is very strong even though their marriage plans do not have the approval of their parents. Not to mention Nuna's matchmaking plans with a successful businessman named Ghani. Until one day Dipta was forced to work out of town, but unexpectedly a big tragedy occurred right when Nuna tested positive for pregnancy.

== Cast ==
- Ochi Rosdiana as Nuansa "Nuna" Aluna
- Amanda Manopo as Bianca Ayumi
- Achmad Megantara as Pradipta Putra Saksena
  - as Baskara Raharja
- Reuben Elishama as Ghani Pratama
- Della Puspita as Metha Andriani
- Steffi Zamora as Kiara
- Key Williams as Marwan
- Alfie Alfandy as Baron
- Rommy Sulastyo as Wibowo Haris Saksena
- Sutan Simatupang as Mahendra
- Adrian Aliman as Bima Yudistira
- Denny Weller as Daniel Umbara
- Ikhsan Saleh as Andrew
- Malida Dinda as Freya
- Narafa Azizah as Sava Aurellia Pratama
- Angga Putra as Eky Saputra
- Hamka Siregar as Monang
- Kris Anjar as Dani Burhan
- Rayhan Rashid as Niko
- Erma Zarina as Ratmi
- Raquel Katie / Rachquel Nesia as Anggun Gayatri Putri
- Jihan Lifa as Iin
- Regina Alya as Vera
- Sendy Taroreh as Indra
- Evelyne Aurora as Chika
- Yessi Kenyang as Yessi
- Elizabeth Christine as Delia
- Anes Morgana as Morgan
- Billy Boedjanger as Ghost

== Production ==
=== Casting ===
In end June 2023, Amanda Manopo was cast as Bianca Ayumi. In July 2023, Manopo quit the show.

== Reception ==
In the first episode, is in sixth place with TVR 2.7 and audience share 11.3%.
