= Noviana =

Noviana

- Noviana Sari, an Indonesian powerlifter
- Adinda Noviana Sari N. Thomas, an Indonesian actress
