= Mendua =

2022 Indonesian drama streaming television series

- Genre: Thriller; Melodrama; Family; Romantic
- Created by: Mike Bartlett
- Based on: Doctor Foster by Mike Bartlett
- Developed by: Keke Mayang; Mike Bartlett
- Written by: Dono Indarto; Sinar Ayu Massie; Mike Bartlett
- Directed by: Pritagita Arianegara
- Starring: Adinia Wirasti; Chicco Jerikho; Tatjana Saphira; Bima Azriel; Widyawati
- Ending theme: "Kisah Sempurna" by Mahalini
- Composers: Aghi Narottama; Bemby Gusti; Tony Merle
- Country of origin: Indonesia
- Original language: Indonesian
- No. of seasons: 1
- No. of episodes: 8

Production
- Executive producer: Anthony Buncio
- Producer: Wicky V. Olindo
- Cinematography: Edi Michael Santoso
- Editor: Dinda Amanda
- Camera setup: Single-camera
- Running time: 48–51 minutes
- Production companies: Screenplay Films; BBC Studios

Original release
- Network: Disney+ Hotstar
- Release: 17 December 2022 – 4 February 2023

Mendua (transl. Between Two Hearts) is an Indonesian television series produced by Screenplay Films and BBC Studios which premiered 17 December 2022 on Disney+ Hotstar. The series based on remake of the series Doctor Foster by Mike Bartlett. This series is directed by Pritagita Arianegara. Starring Adinia Wirasti, Chicco Jerikho and Tatjana Saphira.

== Plot ==
The life of Sekar, a successful doctor with a peaceful life because she has a small, happy family. She lives in an elite area of Jakarta with her husband, Ivan and their son, Dennis. The marriage has also been running for 15 years without encountering any major problems. However, a complicated situation occurs when Sekar accidentally notices her husband's suspicious movements. This suspicion sparked a big problem that Sekar had never imagined before. She has to face a dilemma full of problems because Ivan is having an affair. Sekar's life, which was initially calm and perfect, is shattered in an instant due to her husband's affair with a young socialite named Bella. Sekar finally tries to uncover Ivan's deception, which has so far been overlooked. However, that effort actually brought Sekar to a situation that was far from what he expected because it was full of betrayal. This condition triggers Sekar to do various unusual things that threaten her career, family, and even herself. Not only uncovering her husband's affair, Sekar also has to strategize to deal with the traitors around him.

== Cast ==
- Adinia Wirasti as Dr. Sekar Atmajaya
- Chicco Jerikho as Ivan Atmajaya
- Tatjana Saphira as Isabella Rijanto
- Bima Azriel as Dennis Atmajaya
- Widyawati as Rosmina Atmajaya
- Jolene Marie as Marsha Mahendra
- Winky Wiryawan as Rama Mahendra
- Melissa Karim as Safina Wijaya
- Dennis Adhiswara as Felix Ali
- Karina Salim as Jenny Lukman
- Morgan Oey as Gerry
- Ibrahim Risyad as Sam Darmawan
- Djenar Maesa Ayu as Dr. Alya Darmawan
- Tuti Kembang Mentari as Mbak Mini
- Agus Lemu as Neri
- Aida Nurmala as Erika Rijanto
- Pierre Gruno as Rizal Rijanto
- Joshua Rundengan as Billy Rijanto
- Dwi Yan as Hakim Ketua
- Indra Brasco as Kuasa Hukum Sekar
- Miranty Dewi as Nunik
- Cole Gribble as Cole: Bella's cousin
