= Foxtrot Six =

2019 Indonesian science fiction film

- Indonesian theatrical release poster
- Directed by: Randy Korompis
- Written by: Randy Korompis
- Produced by: Mario Kassar; Randy Korompis; Guillaume Catala; Henry Djunaedi; Wanyi Hindrawan Pratiknyo; Andreas Ian Tika; Dhamoo Punjabi; Manoj Punjabi; Albert Balink
- Starring: Oka Antara; Verdi Solaiman; Chicco Jerikho; Rio Dewanto; Arifin Putra; Mike Lewis
- Cinematography: Ical Tanjung
- Edited by: Denny R. Rihardie
- Music by: Rob Powers
- Production companies: MD Pictures; Rapid Eye Pictures
- Distributed by: MD Pictures
- Release date: 21 February 2019
- Running time: 114 minutes
- Country: Indonesia
- Language: English
- Budget: IDR 70 billion ($5 million by rate at that time)
- Box office: IDR 20.6 billion

Foxtrot Six is a 2019 English-language Indonesian science fiction action film written and directed by Randy Korompis in his directorial debut, and co-produced by Korompis, Mario Kassar, and Manoj Punjabi. The production of this film spent a budget of up to IDR 70 billion which was considered the largest for an Indonesian action film when it was released. The film was released on 21 February 2019.

The film stars Oka Antara, Verdi Solaiman, Chicco Jerikho, Arifin Putra, and Rio Dewanto. The choreography of the fighting action in this film is handled by Iko Uwais' 'Uwais Team' fighting choreography team.

== Plot ==
In 2019, former Indonesian Marine soldier and journalist Angga Saputra proposes to his girlfriend and fellow journalist Sari Nirmala moments before she leaves for Solo to interview the newly democratically elected president, Indra. The same day, a revolution led by PIRANAS breaks out and she and the elected president are declared missing.

11 years later, Angga has become a PIRANAS cadre and now is a congressman of the party. The ongoing food and economy crisis has given rise to a rebel group called "Reform", and to eliminate that group and improve the party's approval rating, he proposes the black ops project "Patriot Act" to the Four Horsemen of PIRANAS Party: President of Indonesia Ahmad Barona, head of PIRANAS propaganda affairs Hengky Laksono, GERRAM paramilitary commander General Adnan Atmadja, and Party Chairman Farid Baskoro. The Four Horsemen accept under the condition that Wisnu "The Wolf" Nugroho, an ardent PIRANAS cadre and fanatical GERRAM executive officer, becomes the head of the operation, and Angga reluctantly meets Wisnu at the GERRAM secret HQ in Jakarta. Angga notices that they are being spied by a drone, and while Wisnu and his men go to pursue the drone, Angga is abducted by a group of armed men led by Spec.

The men turn out to be Reform members and they bring Angga to their hideout where he reunites with Sari, who had gone into hiding with Indra and founded the Reform in order to topple the corrupt regime, and also meets his and Sari's daughter Dinda, who was born while she was in hiding. Wisnu and the GERRAM death squad attack the hideout and Angga, Dinda, Sari, and Spec escape to an abandoned shopping mall which has become a hideout for Indra's men, supporters, and displaced people hiding from GERRAM brutality. Angga resolves to help the people and gathers his former Marine team Foxtrot 5: Oggi, Bara, Tino, and Ethan. Together with Spec, the team unofficially becomes Foxtrot 6.

Ethan hacks PIRANAS server and they learn about PIRANAS plan to kill its own senators in a false flag operation to frame the Reform and enact a mass state-sanctioned genocide to purge any voice opposing the PIRANAS and Ahmad's administration. GERRAM manage to track them and assault Ethan's apartment building, and they escape.

On the D-day of the plan, GERRAM members attack the senators' convoy, but the Reforms intervene and manage to save them. When they returned to the shelter, Wisnu and his squad are already there and have detained Indra and Sari, while Dinda and several civilians have been locked in a freight elevator. Wisnu hangs the senators with a crane and videotapes their death as false evidence, and his team proceed to set fire to the mall. While Dinda manages to activate the elevator emergency brakes and save the civilians, Angga could not save Sari in time and she falls to her death.

After they escape the burning building, they learn that Spec had called the Indonesian Marines and they have set up a base outside. Angga's bodyguard Sgt. N. "Raya" Pratama is among them, and she gives them access to a plane and military equipment to launch a suicide mission to overthrow Ahmad. Across the country, PIRANAS is repeatedly airing the senators' killing video.

The Foxtrot 6 successfully infiltrate the PIRANAS complex. Oggi falls in the ensuing battle. Gen. Adnan is killed by Ethan with a commandeered Kodiaks powered exoskeleton armor, while Farid escapes. Angga and Ethan reach the presidential office, take Hengky as hostage and force him to make a confession about PIRANAS conspiracy. Before he can confess, Ahmad shows up and kills him before leaving for Istana Negara with his guards. Wisnu stabs Ethan from behind and fights Angga on the rooftop helipad. Wisnu shoots Angga down with his last bullet.

At Istana Negara, Ahmad announces the law which authorizes civilians to kill any Reform members (mimicking the Indonesian mass killings of 1965–66) before a crowd of citizens. However, the video screens around him suddenly play Ahmad's earlier incriminating conversation with Angga, which Ethan had recorded with the Kodiaks onboard camera before succumbing to his injuries and is broadcast by Angga from the PIRANAS HQ. Realizing what actually happened, public support for PIRANAS drops immediately and the crowd storm the Istana Negara. Outside the burning PIRANAS HQ, Wisnu and his surviving men are confronted and brutally killed by angry villagers waiting for them.

A week after the incident, Angga and Bara attend the funeral of Sari, Oggi, and Ethan. Spec's body was not found, while Tino had bailed out earlier without saying anything. Ahmad's administration has collapsed and the president has been arrested by law enforcement and is awaiting his trial, while PIRANAS has completely been dissolved. Angga and Dinda enjoy a walk in the city, no longer living in fear.

Somewhere, a United States helicopter lands and Spec boards it with several US Marines saluting him, implying that Spec is actually an American operative. Since the US also aided GERRAM with military equipment in the beginning of the film, their involvement is up to the audience's imagination.

In the post-credit scene, Angga, Oggi, Tino, and Ethan receive a box full of Kit Kat from an unknown person.

== Cast ==
- Oka Antara as Lt. (Ret.) Angga Saputra/The Congressman. A retired lieutenant of Indonesian Marine and former leader and strategist of Marine's Foxtrot 5 Team. After retired from Marine and becoming a PIRANAS cadre, he raised his rank and become the congressman. Defected the party, sided to The Reform, and leading The Reform's Foxtrot 6 Team to topple the corrupt regime.
- Chicco Jerikho as Spec. A mysterious The Reform operative. A hand-to-hand combatant expert and also the sniper of The Reform's Foxtrot 6. Later revealed as an American operative.
- Verdi Solaiman as Oggi. Former Indonesian Marine operatives and demolition expert of Marine's Foxtrot 5 Team. Joining The Reform's Foxtrot 6.
- Rio Dewanto as Bara. Former Indonesian Marine operatives and hand-to-hand combatant expert of Marine's Foxtrot 5 Team. Turned into street fighter after retirement. Joining The Reform's Foxtrot 6.
- Arifin Putra as Tino. Former Indonesian Marine operatives and map expert of Marine's Foxtrot 5 Team. Fired from Marine for "insubordination", and briefly joined PIRANAS HQ construction works only to be fired again for unknown reason. He actually quite gifted with eidetic memory and able to memorize PIRANAS HQ delicate design floor-by-floor. Joining The Reform's Foxtrot 6.
- Mike Lewis as Ethan Suryadi. Former Indonesian Marine operatives and tech expert of Marine's Foxtrot 5 Team. The most geek member of The Reform's Foxtrot 6.
- Miller Khan as Former President-elect Indra Siswadi. Described as president with full of hope for Indonesia and said even able to change the world. After his fall, he lost everything, powers, and will to be a president. Despite that, he still willing to protect his people from PIRANAS oppression and founded The Reform.
- Julie Estelle as Sari Nirmala. Former journalist-turned-rebel. Co-founder of The Reform.
- Gisellma Firmansyah as Dinda. Daughter of Sari and Angga.
- Edward Akbar as Wisnu Nugroho. An ardent PIRANAS cadre and GERRAM executive officer. Renowned as master tactician and skilled hand-to-hand combatant. Due to his brutality, he feared by many.
- Norman R. Akyuwen as H. Aula. Wisnu's henchmen and a ruthless fighter.
- Godfred Orindeod as Gecko. Wisnu's henchmen and a ruthless fighter and spear-fighting master. His favorite gadget is invisibility cloak, which enabling him to blend near-perfectly with his surrounding.
- Willem Bevers as President Ahmad Barona. A PIRANAS cadre that came into power by usurping the rightful president-elect.
- Cok Simbara as Senator R. Soeganda. Superior of Angga in PIRANAS Party.
- Aurélie Moeremans as Sgt. N. "Raya" Pratama. An Indonesian Marine operative. Previously also assigned as Angga's chauffeur and congressman's guard.
- Ario Prabowo as Media mogul and Head of PIRANAS Propaganda Affairs Hengky Laksono.
- Otig Pakis as Gen. Adnan Atmadja. Commander of GERRAM, PIRANAS armed-wing.
- Joshua Pandelaki as PIRANAS party chairman Farid Baskoro.
- Dayu Wijanto as Oggi's mother

== Production ==
Foxtrot Six is directorial debut of Randy Korompis, a former cameraman of Screenplay (2011) and Hollywood Seagull (2013). The production phase of Foxtrot Six took unusually long time. The screenwriting wrote since 2010, pre-production at 2015, started filming at 2017, and finally released at 2019. Overall, the production spanned across 9 years. Mario Kassar, executive producer of Terminator and Rambo franchise, became the executive producer of this film.

Foxtrot Six also renowned as the first Indonesian film that use CGI fully. The CGI process was handled and/or supervised by Andrew Juano, who succeeded in handling CGI of The Walking Dead and Life of Pi.

== Release ==
The film released in Indonesia on 21 February 2019.

== Reception ==
The reception of Foxtrot Six is quite mixed. Foxtrot Six was praised for bringing up themes that are quite rarely explored in Indonesian movies: state, politics, rebellion against tyranny, poverty, and public chaos. Foxtrot Six are praised for the involvement of many Indonesian stars during the making, full of extreme actions, and unusually large and expensive production value for Indonesian film with IDR 70 billion spent during the process, making Foxtrot Six an elegant and luxurious movie that became the most expensive Indonesia made to this date. Critics also praised the use of English, which the stars of this movie are clearly well-versed at. The use of English as the main language for the movie's dialogues was intended rather than Indonesian due to Mario Kassar's intention of bringing the film to Hollywood. However, the film also has several weakness, mainly in plot holes and background story of the characters being largely under explored.
