= Eva Celia =

Indonesian actress and singer

Eva Celia Lesmana
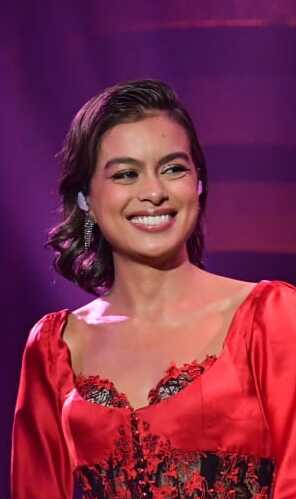
- Eva Celia pictured at the 2019 Indonesian Film Festival
- Born: Eva Celia Lesmana; 21 September 1992 (age 34); Jakarta, Indonesia
- Other name: Eva Celia
- Occupations: Actress model singer songwriter
- Years active: 2000–present
- Parent(s): Indra Lesmana (father); Sophia Latjuba (mother)
- Relatives: Mira Lesmana (aunt)

Eva Celia Lesmana, better known as Eva Celia (born 21 September 1992) is an Indonesian actress and singer-songwriter of mixed German-Bugis, Javanese, and Madurese descent. She was born in Jakarta, the daughter of Indonesian jazz musician, Indra Lesmana, and actress Sophia Latjuba.

== Acting ==
Celia performed in several television soap operas. She performed in Sherina as Sherina, played the role of Juwita in Juwita Jadi Putri, and as Siska in Sentuh Hatiku.

She made her film acting debut in 2008, in the horror film Takut: Faces of Fear. She went on to perform in Jamila and the President (2009) as the young Jamila, Adriana (2013) as Adriana, and The Golden Cane Warrior (2014).

In 2015, she produced a short film called Biang.

Celia has also appeared in advertisements for GIV, Tolak Angin Anak, RexonaTeen, Suzuki Karimun Estilo, Emeron, and the Samsung Galaxy A8.

== Music ==
Celia is a jazz singer-songwriter, guitarist, and lyricist. As the daughter of a well-known musician, she says that she was influenced by the music she heard at home growing up, even though she was never pressured by her father to pursue music.

She released her first singles, "Reason" and "Against Time," in 2015. She followed up the next year with her first album, And So It Begins. Performers on the album included her father, Aldhan Prasatya, Demas Narawangsa, Tendra, members of Snarky Puppy and Beau Diakowicz.

In 2016, she was nominated for "Penyanyi Solo Pria/Wanita Soul/R&B/Urban Terbaik" in the Indonesian Music Awards.

In 2017, she received nominations for both Album of the Year and Female Singer of the Year at the Indonesian Choice Awards.

Her early public performances included Java Jazz 2013, where she performed with her father, Indra Lesmana. In 2017, she performed as part of "3 Stories, 1 Room," a tour of six Indonesian cities with musicians Kunto Aji and Jordi Waelauruw.

== Discography ==
=== Studio albums ===
Title	Details
And So It Begins	Released: 8 December 2016; Label: 7th Ave Music, Demajors
Eva Celia	Released: 23 August 2023; Label: DEVotion

=== Extended plays ===
Title	Details
Lifeline: Introduction	Released: 12 July 2019; Label: 7th Ave Music

=== Singles ===
Title	Year	Album
"Christmas Song" (featuring Indra Lesmana)	2013	Non-album single
"Reason"	2015	And So It Begins
"Against Time"	2016	And So It Begins
"A Long Way"	2019	Lifeline: Introduction
"Kala Senja"	2019	Lifeline: Introduction
"Love Within"	2020	Non-album single
"Selfish"	2020	Lifeline: Introduction
"C.H.R.I.S.Y.E." (with Diskoria and Laleilmanino)	2021	Non-album single
"Crush"	2023	Eva Celia
"Electric"	2023	Eva Celia

== Filmography ==
Year	Title	Role	Notes
2008	Takut: Faces of Fear	Gadis	Segment: "The Rescue"
2009	Jamila dan Sang Presiden	Teenage Jamila	
2013	Adriana	Adriana	
2014	The Golden Cane Warrior	Dara	
2018	Milly & Mamet: Ini Bukan Cinta & Rangga	Jojo	
2024	The Shadow Strays	Volver	
2025	If Mom Doesn't Marry Dad	Anis	
2025	The Elixir	Karina	
2026	The Sea Speaks His Name	Ratih Anjani	
