= Opick =

Indonesian religious singer

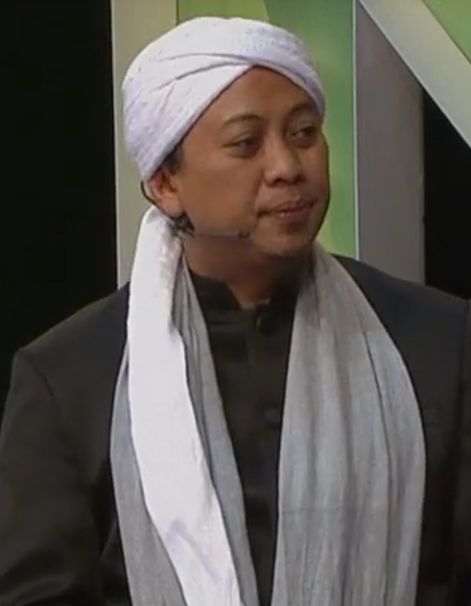
- Opick on MeleTOP, 2015
- Born: Aunur Rofiq Lil Firdaus; March 16, 1974 (age 52); Jember, East Java, Indonesia
- Occupations: Singer; songwriter; actor
- Years active: 1995–present
- Known for: Indonesian religious singer, writer of Dealova
- Musical career
- Genres: Pop, Islamic, Pop-rock
- Instrument: Vocals
- Labels: Aquarius Musikindo; Blackboard Indonesia

Aunur Rofiq Lil Firdaus (Arabic: أونور رفيق للفردوس), better known as Opick, is an Indonesian religious singer, songwriter, preacher, and actor. He's known for his cover of Tombo Ati, a traditional Javanese song written by Sunan Bonang, one of the nine revered Islamic saints in Java, as well as the songwriter of Dealova that was sung by Once Mekel.

In 2006, he was awarded the title of "Best Pop Song Writer" by Indonesian Music Awards for his song Dealova.

== Early life ==
Opick was born in Jember Regency, East Java, to Abdul Gofur and Lilik Sholelah, he is the grandson of a well-known preacher in his village, K.H. Abdul Mukti. From a young age, he has learnt how to be self-sufficient, having to live by himself in a rented boarding house because his house was far from his elementary school.

== Musical career ==
Since he was in middle school, he had dreams of becoming a musician, taking great interest to music and theatre. After he graduated from high school, he moved to Jakarta to fulfil his dreams. During his stay, he participated in Bela Studio theatre group, he worked as a cleaner and would sometimes sing at bus stops from dawn.

=== Rock and pop-rock beginnings ===
In the 90s, he formed a hard rock band called Timor Band with his close friends from Jember, many of their works received criticisms and backlash due to its harsh lyrics, he offered their demo album Nyanyian Perjalanan (lit. 'Songs of the Journey'), to many labels, but was often rejected until it was accepted in 1997 by TVRI for their short programme for new years.

In 1999, Opick released a pop-rock debut album titled Pasar Malam Di Kepalamu (lit. 'A Night Market In Your Head') under his new name Au Nur, it was produced under the label Airo Records, it was later re-released under the name Jejak Langkah (lit. 'Footsteps') in 2005.

In 2003, Opick released a second album under his new and current pseudonym, Opick, titled Tak Ada Habisnya (lit. 'No End').

=== Islamic music career ===
In the early 2000s, Opick experienced many failures in his musical career, with his albums not selling much in the wider market. Though he was a rocker, he was known for being pious, he shifted his musical career from rock to religious music, often appearing wearing a turban and Muslim attire in his performances. He was offered to be a judge at the Nasyid, Tausyiah dan Qiraah show on TV7. After his appearance, he was asked to compose and sing religious songs by K.H. Arifin Ilham, and was asked by Agus Idwar, a member of Snada, to make a cover of Tombo Ati.

In mid to late 2004, his arrangement of Tombo Ati gains renowned popularity after RCTI claim it as the theme song of Ramadan of 1425, as well as the usage of the song in the news coverage of the tsunami in Aceh.

In 2005, he offered his 1999 song, Dealova, to Once Mekel after rejecting multiple other artists whom he considered unfit for the song, it was used as a part of a film soundtrack by the same name.

In early June 2005, he released his debut religious album Istighfar (lit. 'I Seek Forgiveness'), it quickly gained popularity and received positive reception in the market, selling up to 200,000 to 310,000 copies in 3 months. The album later received 5 platinums after selling over 800,000 copies in mid-2006.

== Discography ==
Pop rock albums
Title	Album details	Sales	Certifications
Pasar Malam Di Kepalamu (A Night Market In Your Head)	Released: 1999; Label: Airo Records; Formats: Cassette	—N/a	—N/a
Tak Ada Habisnya (No End)	Released: December 2003; Label: Forte Records; Formats: Cassette	—N/a	—N/a
Religious albums
Title	Album details	Sales	Certifications
Istighfar (I Seek Forgiveness)	Released: June 2005; Label: Aquarius Musikindo; Formats: CD, cassette, digital download	800,000+	—N/a
Semesta Bertasbih (The Universe Exhalts)	Released: 2006; Label: Aquarius Musikindo; Formats: CD, cassette, digital download	—N/a	—N/a
Ya Rahman (O The Beneficent)	Released: 2007; Label: Aquarius Musikindo; Formats: CD, cassette, digital download	—N/a	—N/a
Cahaya Hati (Heart's Light)	Released: 2008; Label: Aquarius Musikindo; Formats: CD, cassette, digital download	—N/a	—N/a
Di Bawah LangitMu (Under Your Light)	Released: 2009; Label: Aquarius Musikindo; Formats: CD, cassette, digital download	—N/a	—N/a
Shollu Ala Muhammad (May Allah Grant Muhammad His Grace)	Released: 3 August 2010; Label: Aquarius Musikindo; Formats: CD, cassette, digital download	—N/a	—N/a
Salam Ya Rosulullah (Greetings, O Messenger Of Allah)	Released: 2012; Label: Aquarius Musikindo; Formats: CD, digital download	—N/a	—N/a
Ya Maulana (O Our Leader)	Released: 2013; Label: Aquarius Musikindo; Formats: CD, digital download	—N/a	—N/a
Sahabat Sejati (Loyal Friend)	Released: 2014; Label: Aquarius Musikindo; Formats: CD, digital download	—N/a	—N/a
Salam Rindu Ya Musthofa (Greetings of Longing O Chosen One)	Released: 5 June 2015; Label: Aquarius Musikindo; Formats: CD, digital download	—N/a	—N/a
Sang Maha Cahaya (The All-Bright)	Released: 5 June 2016; Label: Aquarius Musikindo; Formats: CD, digital download	—N/a	—N/a
Allah Bersamamu (Allah Is With You)	Released: 6 June 2017; Label: Aquarius Musikindo; Formats: CD, digital download	—N/a	—N/a
Sang Pencari (The Searcher)	Released: 31 May 2019; Label: Aquarius Musikindo; Formats: CD, digital download	—N/a	—N/a
Wahai Pemilik Jiwa (O The Owner Of This Soul)	Released: 8 April 2021; Label: Aquarius Musikindo; Formats: CD, digital download	—N/a	—N/a

=== Compilations ===
- The Best of Opick (2011)

=== Live album ===
- The Best of Opick Live & Acoustic (2015)
- Senandung Hari Raya Live: Opick (2023)

=== Singles ===
- "Indahnya Ramadhan" (2021)
- "Engkau Tak Sendiri" featuring Reza Artamevia (2022)
- "Shollu Ala Ahmad" (2022)
- "Tombo Ati (Obat Hati)" (2023)
- "Cahaya Hati" (Live Version) (2023)
- "Assalamu'alaikum" (Live Version) (2024)
- "Tersenyumlah" (2024)
- "Allah Ya Maulana" (2025)

=== Collaboration albums ===
- Tausiyah Dzikir dan Nasyid (2004) with the song 'Tombo Ati'
- Obat Hati: Kumpulan Nasyid Persaudaraan (2005) with the song 'Tombo Ati'
- Bunga Kasih Sayang (2006) with the songs 'Satu Rindu' and 'Alhamdulillah' (featuring Amanda)
- Dua Belas Lagu Islami Terbaik Vol. 3 (2007) with the songs 'Ya Robbana' (featuring Uje) and 'Taqwa'
- RCTI Cinta Ramadhan (2008) with the songs 'Ramadhan Tiba', 'Assalamualaikum', and 'Tombo Ati'
- Cinta Ramadhan 2 (2009) with the songs 'Cahaya Hati' and 'Hanya Hamba Allah' (featuring Amanda)
- Muhasabah Cinta (2010) with the song 'Maha Melihat' (featuring Amanda)
- Keimananku (2011) with the song 'Cahaya Hati'
- Menuju Kemenangan (2012) with the song 'Allah Maha Besar (versi baru)'
- Ramadhan Penuh Cinta (2018) with the songs 'Syukur Atas Karunia' and 'KarenaMu'
- Senandung Hari Raya (2023) with the songs 'Tombo Ati (versi baru)' and 'Ramadan Tiba (versi baru)'

== Filmography ==
=== Film ===
Year	Title	Cast	Ref.
2008	Kun Fayakuun		
2010	Di Bawah Langit	Gelung	

=== Television series ===
Year	Title	Cast	Ref.
2008	Hamba-Hamba Allah	Jaelani	

== Awards and nominations ==
Award	Year	Category	Work/Nominee	Result	Ref.
Indonesian Music Awards	2006	Best Pop Song Writer	"Dealova"	Won	
