= Adinda Thomas =

Indonesian actress and model (born 1993)

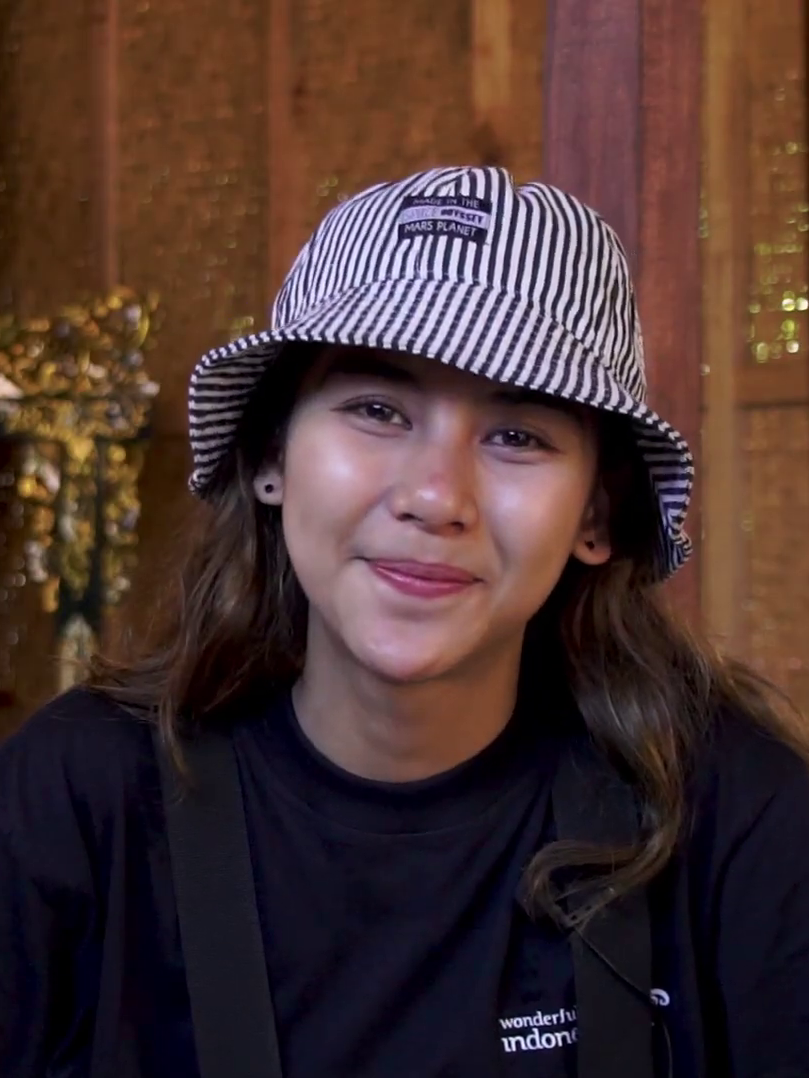
- Adinda Thomas at Banyuwangi in 2021
- Born: Adinda Noviana Sari Nurjannah Thomas; August 8, 1993 (age 33); Bandung, West Java, Indonesia
- Education: London School of Public Relations Public Vocational High School 10 Bandung
- Occupations: Model; Businessperson; Singer
- Years active: 2013–present

Adinda Noviana Sari Nurjannah Thomas, S.I.Kom., or better known as Adinda Thomas (born 8 August 1993) is an Indonesian actress, model, entrepreneur and singer. Adinda Thomas made her debut in acting by playing Mini in the soap opera Ibrahim Anak Betawi in 2013. Then, in 2015, she played a role in her first film, namely Youtubers. Adinda Thomas became widely known thanks to her appearances in the soap opera Super Dede (2015) and also the sitcom The East (2017–2019).

== Career ==
=== Early career ===
Adinda Thomas's desire to become an artist has been raised since childhood. While at school, her family had experienced financial problems which forced Adinda Thomas to help her parents to earn money. Her father at that time had to work as a newsagent and he helped sell. To supplement her income, Adinda Thomas also sells toys and flowers on campuses that hold graduations. In these conditions she often received insults from people around her. Adinda Thomas admitted that this was the reason for her desire to enter the world of entertainment.

Adinda Thomas has been a model and has participated in fashion shows since elementary school. With the support of her parents, she entered a modeling agency. Entering junior high school, she found a new hobby, namely playing a motorcycle. Due to frequent falls and leaving many scars, she was forced to quit the world of modelling. After she finished, Adinda Thomas became interested in the world of singing. She once composed a song when she was in high school.

After graduating from high school, Adinda Thomas went to Jakarta to study at the London School of Public Relations. In her early college years, she admitted that she often skipped classes to go to castings because he had to earn money for college. According to her, by working in the entertainment world, she could divide her time between work and college. For six months, her casting always failed, until at the end of 2013, thanks to the help of friends, he was invited to enter the entertainment world for the first time. Early in her career, she played in the soap opera Ibrahim Anak Betawi.

=== 2014 – 2015: Television film and debut film ===
In 2014, she focused on acting by starring in many FTV titles. This made Adinda Thomas's lectures fall apart. She said she was tempted after being able to get money from her own hard work.

In 2015, Adinda Thomas played in her first feature film entitled Youtubers by Kemal Palevi and Jovial da Lopez. Shortly after the film, she was entrusted with being the main character in a film starring mostly Extravaganza alumni entitled The Wedding & Bebek Betutu. She also played in the soap opera Super Dede as Adinda Thomas. During filming for soap operas, he admitted that it was quite difficult to divide her time between filming and studying. At the end of 2015, Ad Thomas tried to sit on the director's bench by directing a short film called Mother. He admitted that he asked for directing input from Monty Tiwa, who had directed him when he starred in the film The Giant from Jogja. He also played in the musical drama television series NET. titled Stereo.

=== 2016–present: The East, KKN di Desa Penari, and Business ===
In 2016, Adinda Thomas starred in 2 feature films. He played the role of Letisha in the film The Giant from Jogja produced by StarVision and played the role of Gendis in the film Maju Kena Mundur Kena Returns produced by MVP Pictures.

From 2017 to 2019, Adinda Thomas played in the NET TV sitcom titled The East as Vira, a production assistant who is sensitive to various things.

In 2019, Adinda Thomas played the character Widya in a horror film based on the story "KKN di Desa Penari" by a Twitter user named SimpleMan. This film was produced by MD Pictures with the same title and is planned to be released in 2022. In this film, Adinda Thomas is required to attend special training to be able to interact with snakes for shooting needs. In 2020, he starred in the Indonesian-Malaysian collaboration film titled First Journey by Arief Malinmudo which premiered at the Jogja-NETPAC Asian Film Festival 2021. In mid-2021, Adinda Thomas starred in a web series produced by Daihatsu entitled Move, directed by Kuntz Agus. She played Indah, opposite Tarra Budiman as Nico. Then, she starred in the third season of a web series produced by Indonesian People's Bank (BRI) titled Pakai Hati. Adinda Thomas also starred in an independent film by Richard Oh entitled Waiting for Mother which will be shown on KlikFilm at the end of 2021.

Apart from having a career in the entertainment world, Adinda Thomas has also developed two businesses. Langit Tak Beratap, an open-air event that is planned to be developed into a limited liability company, and Paraoel, a clothing business.

== Filmography ==
=== Films ===
Year	Title	Role	Information
2015	Youtubers	Julia	
2015	The Wedding & Bebek Betutu	Lana Sastranegara	
2015	Magic Hour	Teman Gweny	Cameo
2016	Raksasa dari Jogja	Letisha	
2016	Maju Kena Mundur Kena Returns	Gadis	
2019	99 Nama Cinta	Mlenuk	
2021	Perjalanan Pertama	Nurma	
2021	Menunggu Bunda	Alya	Film orisinal KlikFilm
2022	Satu untuk Selamanya	Salma	Film orisinal KlikFilm
2022	KKN di Desa Penari (KKN in Dancer's Village)	Widya	
2022	Anak Penangkap Hantu	Gita	

Information

Not yet released

=== Serial web ===
Year	Title	Role	Information
2019	Jejak Rasa	Dinda	
2019	Nanti Kita Cerita tentang Hari Ini	Oka	
2020	Cerita Sebuah Catatan	Sarah	
2021	Pindah	Indah	First season
2021	Pakai Hati Season 3	Ria	Third season
2021	Pindah Season 2	Indah	Second season

=== Television series ===
Year	Title	Role	Information
2013–2014	Ibrahim Anak Betawi	Mini	Acting debut
2014	7 Pusaka	Amel	Episode: Kuali Pengintip Masa Depan
2014	Detak Cinta	Mona	
2015	Super Dede	Dinda	
2015–2016	Stereo	Bella	
2016	Lovepedia		Episode: Cowok 1000 Likes
2017	Seribu Kisah		Episode: Si Juki Jodoh dari Betawi
2017	Cermin Kehidupan		Episode: Pesta yang Dibenci Tuhan
2017–2019	The East	Vira	
2022	Kekasih Halal	Rayya Anindita	

=== Television films ===
- Cantik-Cantik Kok Kuli (2014)
- Delivery Order (Bukan Salah Jodoh) (2014)
- Hey Aku Love Kamu (2014)
- Pembantu Tak Pernah Ingkar Janji (2014)
- Terjebak Cinta Cewek Culun (2014)
- Cintaku Selebar Tanah Babe (2014)
- Pencopet Cantik (2014)
- Jodohku di Tangan Babeh (2014)
- Balada Jomblo Metropolitan (2014)
- Service TV Jalan Cinta (2014)
- Unyu-Unyu Tukang Balon (2014)
- Romantika Supir Cantik (2014)
- Kesuntik Cinta Dokter Cantik (2014)
- Satpam Butet Penjaga Hati (2015)
- Saodah Hanya Kau Cintaku (2015)
- Duyung Mencari Cinta (2015)
- Queen of Comblang (2017)
- Ada Cinta di Atas Genteng (2017)
- My Secret Admirer (2017)
- Ditikung Cinta Comblang (2017)
- Ojek in Love (2017)
- Berita Cinta dari Cinta (2017)
- Mantan's Wedding Bikin Keki (2017)
- Keblinger Mas Ganteng di Anyer (2018)

== Discography ==
=== Singles ===
- "Hilang" (2019) with rumahsakit

=== Songs sung on Stereo ===
- "Tentang Aku" (Jingga)
- "Kecewa" (Bunga Citra Lestari)
- "Ada Cinta" (Bening)
- "Senang Bersamamu" (Naif) with Pradikta Wicaksono
- "Jangan Kau Henti" (Lingua) with Pradikta Wicaksono
