= Alfie Alfandy =

Indonesian actor

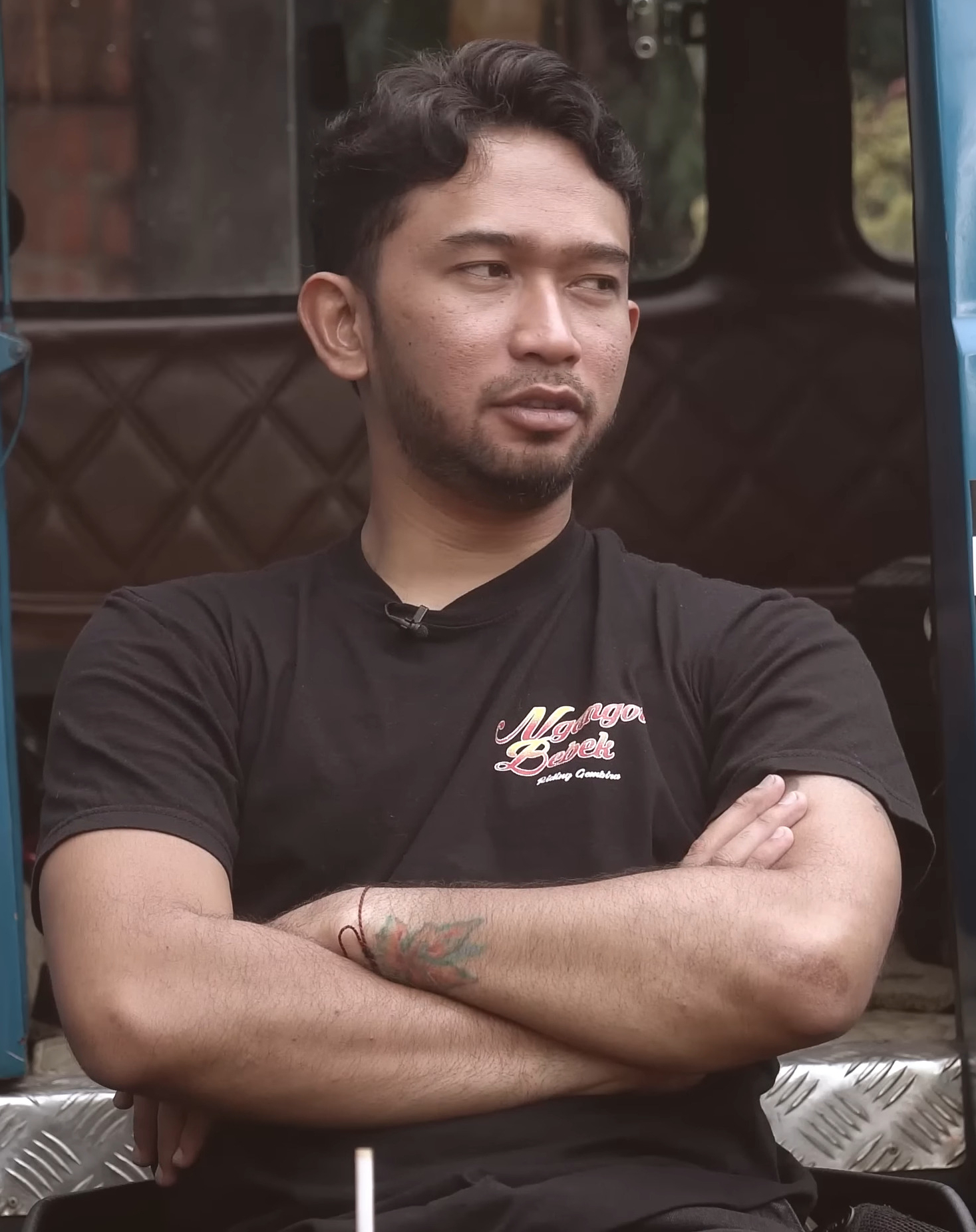
- Alfie Alfandy in 2024
- Born: 3 March 1990 (age 36); Medan, Indonesia
- Occupations: Actor, musician, da'i
- Years active: 2009—present
- Spouse: Fitri Arifin (m. 2016)

Alfie Alfandy (born 3 March 1990) is an Indonesian actor and musician who is known for his various roles in Islamic films and television series, including his role as Jefri Al Buchori in Hijrah Cinta (2014) which earned him a nomination for best lead actor in 2014 Maya Awards and 2015 Indonesian Movie Awards. As a musician, Alfie has released several singles and a mini-album. Outside of acting, Alfie founded a motorcycling and dawah club called Bikers Dakwah.

== Entertainment career ==
=== Film and television ===
Alfie Alfandy received his first lead role in the film, Hijrah Cinta, where he portrayed Indonesian Islamic preacher Jefri Al Buchori, also known as "Uje". Alfie said that he joined the casting process for Uje due to a recommendation from fellow actor Ramon Y. Tungka when they were visiting Mount Bromo, while film producer Raam Punjabi said that Hanung Bramantyo recommended Alfie to join the casting. Alfie said that he prepared for the role for four months by studying the religion and getting in touch with Uje's friends and teachers. Responding to comments that he resembled Uje, Alfie said that he related to Uje's dark past, especially as both of them used to be an addict. For his portrayal of Uje, Alfie received nominations in 2014 Maya Awards for Best Actor in a Leading Role and in 2015 Indonesian Movie Awards for Most Favorite Lead Actor. In 2015, Alfie reprised his role as Uje in the television series adaptation of Hijrah Cinta.

In the 2023 film Buya Hamka, Alfie played the role of Dadang, a prison warden who guarded the titular Indonesian preacher. Alfie said that he accepted the role because Hamka is one of his inspirations.

=== Music ===
Alfie has written songs since high school and has a musical background from his grandfather who is a keroncong musician. In 2017, Alfie sang "Syukuri Ujian-Mu" (written by Antrabez) as the theme song for the eleventh season of the Para Pencari Tuhan TV series and released it as a single.

In 2022, Alfie released his second single titled "Dirangkul Bukan Dipukul" (English: "Embraced, Not Punched"). The song was written by Alfie himself, with Faank of Wali as the producer, Iksan Hartady as the arranger, and Roby Tremonty as the guitarist. Alfie said that the song was inspired by the Bikers Dakwah group that he formed, and whose motto is the same as the song's title.

In 2023, Alfie released a pop indie mini album titled Generasi Berfikir (English: Thinking Generation) and consisting of five songs written by himself. Alfie said that the mini album was released to record the ideas he had been having in the previous years. The production of the mini album took three months. In 2024, Alfie released a single titled "Rayuan Semesta".

== Religious activities ==
In multiple occasions, Alfie recalled that he once got overdosed on drugs and felt like he was dying. Alfie said that the experience, coupled with another experience of seeing another person dying while smiling, made him close to Islam. In 2017, Alfie went to Yaman for two months to further study Islam.

=== Bikers Dakwah ===
After studying in Darul Musthofa Yaman, Alfie founded a motorcycle club, Bikers Dakwah, as a way to do dawah while doing his hobby. Alfie said that he was following his teacher's advice to preach where he hangs out. Bikers Dakwah's dawah activities are helped by Alfie's friends from Darul Musthofa. As of January 2023, Bikers Dakwah has 45 chapters.

== Awards and nominations ==
Award	Year	Category	Nominated work	Result	Ref.
Maya Awards	2014	Best Actor in a Leading Role	Hijrah Cinta	Nominated	
Indonesian Movie Awards	2015	Most Favorite Lead Actor	Hijrah Cinta	Nominated	
Anugerah Syiar Ramadhan	2018	Inspiring Young Actor	—N/a	Won	
