= Tombo Ati =

Javanese song

Tombo Ati is a traditional Javanese song composed by Sunan Bonang, one of Wali Sanga, from Tuban, East Java. The song is about a Muslim's ways of gaining spiritual peace and tranquility, through tahajjud, reciting the Qur'an, fasting, gathering with pious people, and in constant remembrance of god, all of which are considered to be "Remedies for the Heart".

This song is still taught at pesantrens, and has been sung, recorded and released by several Indonesian singers.

== Lyric ==
The lyric of this song was written in vernacular Javanese languages. There are several modern adaptations, but a common version is:

Javanese text

Tombo Ati iku limo perkorone
Kaping pisan moco Kuran lan maknane
Kaping pindo sholat wengi lakonono
Kaping telu wong kang soleh kumpulono
Kaping papat wetengiro ingkang luwe
Kaping limo zikir wengi ingkang suwe
Salah sawijine sopo iso ngelakoni
Mugi-mugi Gusti Allah nyembadani

English Translation

There are five remedies of heart
First, read the Quran and understand its meaning
Second, do the night prayer
Third, gather with pious people
Fourth, fast (literally: keep a hungry stomach) regularly
Fifth, do long zikir at night
Anyone who can do even one of those
may the Lord God (Allah) bless

The key message of this song is to gain spiritual peace, someone must follow the guidance of God.

== Popularity ==
Opick's album 'Istighfar', which contains an adaptation of Tombo Ati, sold at least 180,000 copies.

Five centuries after its composition, this song is still one of the most popular traditional Javanese songs. Its popularity also spread to mostly Muslim Indonesian region such as Sumatra. Islamic song contests in Indonesia often use it as a mandatory song. Due to its spiritual contents, pesantrens often teach it, particularly in traditional inland parts of Java.

Indonesian singers have re-released it as a modern religious song, often accompanied with Indonesian translation. One of the latest adaptations, on the album 'Istighfar' by Opick, has sold at least 180,000 copies. Another adaptation, by Emha Ainun Nadjib, is also famous. This song is especially popular during the holy month of Ramadan.

== See also ==
- Wali Songo
- Tuban
- Javanese language
- Islam in Indonesia
