= Di Timur Matahari =

- Promotional poster
- Directed by: Ari Sihasale
- Produced by: Ari Sihasale; Nia Zulkarnaen
- Starring: Laura Basuki; Lukman Sardi; Ririn Ekawati; Ringgo Agus Rahman; Michael Jakarimilena
- Distributed by: Alenia Pictures
- Release date: 14 June 2012
- Running time: 114 minutes
- Country: Indonesia
- Language: Indonesian

Di Timur Matahari (phrasal translation: To The East of the Morning Sun) is a 2012 Indonesian film directed by Ari "Ale" Sihasale and starring Laura Basuki and Lukman Sardi. Shot in Tioh, Lanny Jaya, Papua, over a period of one month, it follows young Papuan children as they struggle to learn despite an ongoing tribal war.

== Plot ==
On Papua, the easternmost island in Indonesia, Thomas, Mazmur, and their friends are waiting for a teacher, who should arrive through the small airstrip in their village; the airstrip is their only contact with the outside world. They have been without a teacher for six months. They have studied on their own from nature and their elders, such as the priest Samuel (Lukman Hakim), doctor Fatimah, and the elders Ucok and Jolex, but it is not enough.

However, Mazmur's father is killed by the father of their friend Agnes. This news drives Mazmur's uncle, Michael, and his wife Vina (Laura Basuki) to come to the village from their home in Jakarta. They arrive in the village as tensions continue to build. Michael tries to ease tensions between the two factions, but is unsuccessful; his other brother, Alex, despises Michael's modern way of life and insists that the killers must pay an eye for an eye. While open violence breaks out among the adults, the children – despite being from different factions – continue to play together and learn with Vina.

== Production ==
Di Timur Matahari was directed by Ari "Ale" Sihasale. He worked with his wife, Nia Zulkarnaen. Their production company, Alenia pictures, which had already made five feature films, produced Di Timur Matahari. The film was their second with scenes in Papua; their first production, the Academy Award-submitted Denias Senandung Di Atas Awan (Denia Singing on the Clouds; 2006) also had scenes filmed in Papua.

The concept for Di Timur Matahari arose from widespread unrest in July and August 2011. Ale, who was born in Papua, was disheartened that the media focused exclusively on violence and did not show aspects of day-to-day life. Ale later stated that he intended the film to help viewers better understand Papua and peace, and, at a press conference, said that the education problem was now national. With his wife, who served as executive producer, he spent three months scouting a location for the film.

Shooting began in late February 2012 in Tioh, Lanny Jaya, Papua. The regency had been recently established, which led to difficulties in production. Shooting took over a month, and as the mountainous regency was very isolated, the 50 cast and crew members underwent hardship caused by the lack of facilities. Star Laura Basuki, in an interview with the Jakarta Globe, recalled that she bathed only once a week and had to use 5 to 10 bottles of mineral water to wash her hair; she also reported that there were only two bathrooms for everyone to share.

== Release and reception ==
Di Timur Matahari premiered at Epicentrum XXI in Kuningan, Jakarta on 11 June 2012; it received a wide release on 14 June 2012, during the school holidays. The film was meant for viewers of all ages, although Ale suggested parents may want to discuss issues in the film with their children.

Maya Sofia and Rizky Sekar Afrisia, reviewing for the news website VIVA News, found the film to be reflective of how adults will forget or even abuse children during war; they wrote that the audience would be "spellbound" (Note: Original: "ditohok") by the innocence of the children.
