= Ria Irawan =

Indonesian actress and singer (1969–2020)

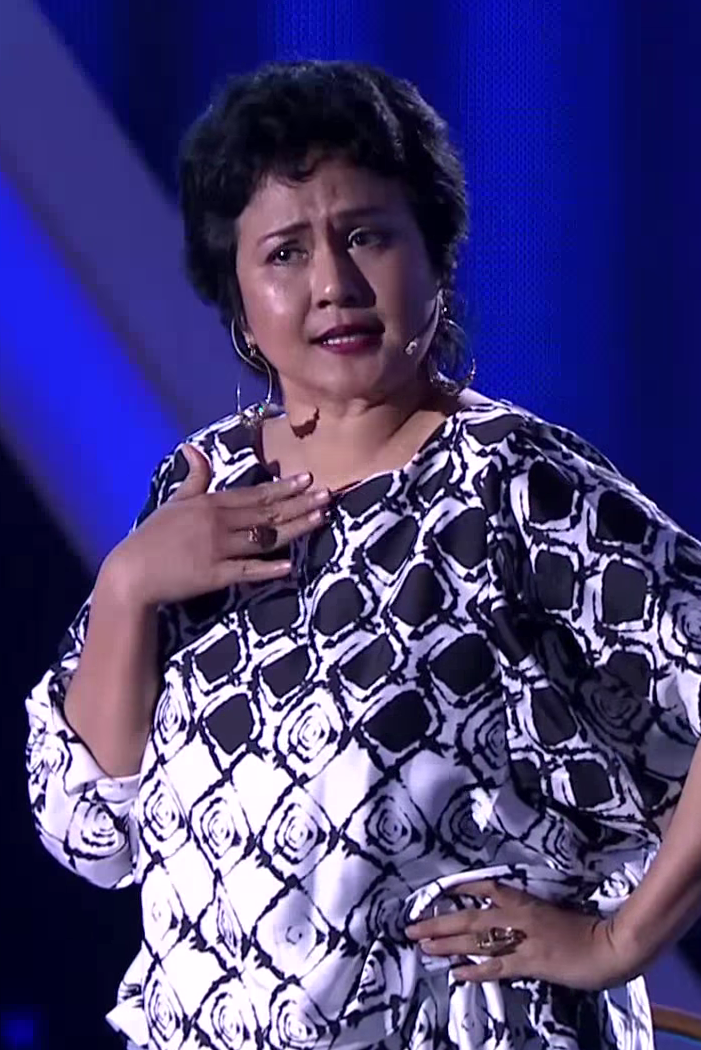
- Born: Chandra Ariati Dewi Irawan; 24 July 1969; Jakarta, Indonesia
- Died: 6 January 2020 (aged 50); Jakarta, Indonesia
- Other name: Ria Irawan
- Occupations: Actress; Singer
- Years active: 1973–2020

Chandra Ariati Dewi "Ria" Irawan (24 July 1969 – 6 January 2020) was an Indonesian actress and singer of Minangkabau descent.

== Biography ==
Irawan began acting at age four, with her debut film being Sopir Taxi. Her breakout role was in the film Kembang Kertas in 1984. She was the daughter of actors Bambang Irawan and Ade Irawan. Her sister, Dewi Irawan, is also an actress.

Irawan died on 6 January 2020, after battling cancer since 2004.

== Discography ==
=== Studio albums ===
- Hatiku Hatimu (with Rano Karno)
- Setangkai Bunga Anggrek (with Rano Karno)
- Hatiku Bagai Tertusuk Diri
- Cahaya Ilahi (with Opick)

== Filmography ==
=== Film ===
Year	Title	Role	Notes
1973	Sopir Taxi	Herself	Cameo appearances
1973	Belas Kasih	Herself	Cameo appearances
1975	Fajar Menyingsing	Ria	Lead role
1976	Chicha		Supporting role
1976	Cinta Abadi	Leila	Lead role
1977	Istriku Sayang Istriku Malang		Supporting role
1977	Siulan Rahasia	Tini	Supporting role
1979	Dari Hati Turun Ke Hati		Supporting role
1979	Ira Maya dan Kakek Ateng		Supporting role
1979	Ira Maya Si Anak Tiri		Supporting role
1980	Darna Ajaib	Little Malia	Supporting role
1980	Nakalnya Anak-Anak		Supporting role
1981	Jangan Ambil Nyawaku		Supporting role
1984	Kembang Kertas	Ani	Supporting role Nominated – 1985 Indonesian Film Festival for Best Supporting Actress
1985	Bila Saatnya Tiba		Supporting role Nominated – 1986 Indonesian Film Festival for Best Supporting Actress
1985	Gejolak Kawula Muda		Supporting role
1986	Ibunda	Fitri	Supporting role
1987	Lupus		Supporting role
1987	Lupus II		Supporting role
1987	Selamat Tinggal Jeanette	Trimah	Supporting role Won – 1988 Indonesian Film Festival for Best Supporting Actress
1988	Anak-Anak Gass	Nana	Lead role
1988	Suami		Supporting role
1989	Adikku kekasihku	Shella	Lead role
1990	Mutiara di Khatulistiwa	Deilira	Supporting role
1991	Peluk Daku dan Lepaskan	Denok	Lead role
1991	Sekretaris	Tin	Lead role
1993	Tabir Biru	Maya	Lead role
2003	Biola Tak Berdawai	Renjani	Lead role Won – 2003 Asia-Pacific Film Festival for Best Actress; Nominated – 2004 MTV Indonesia Movie Awards for Most Favorite Actress
2003	Arisan!	Yayuk Asmara	Supporting role
2004	Tina Toon & Lenong Bocah The Movie		Supporting role
2004	Impian Kemarau	Waitress	Supporting role
2005	Belahan Jiwa	Halimah	Supporting role
2005	Janji Joni	Producer Film	Cameo appearances
2006	Berbagi Suami	Sri	Supporting role Won – 2006 Indonesian Film Festival for Best Supporting Actress; Won – 2006 MTV Indonesia Movie Awards for Most Favorite Supporting Actress; Nominated – 2007 Indonesian Movie Awards for Best Supporting Actress; Nominated – 2007 Indonesian Movie Awards for Favorite Supporting Actress
2007	Quickie Express	Aunt Guru	Supporting role
2008	May		Supporting role
2008	Sang Dewi		Supporting role
2008	Cinlok	Tika	Supporting role
2008	Cinta Setaman	Lastri	Supporting role
2009	Ai Lop Yu Pul	Emak' best friend	Cameo appearances
2009	Jamila dan Sang Presiden	Susi	Supporting role
2010	Madame X	Aunt Yantje	Supporting role
2011	Arisan! 2	Yayuk Asmara	Supporting role
2013	Romantini		Supporting role
2013	9 Summers 10 Autumns	Mrs. Agus	Supporting role
2015	Bulan Diatas Kuburan	Minar	Supporting role Won – 2015 Maya Awards for Best Actress in a Leading Role; Nominated – 2016 Usmar Ismail Awards for Best Female Supporting Role; Nominated – 2016 Indonesian Movie Awards for Favorite Supporting Actress; Won – 2016 Indonesian Movie Awards for Best Supporting Actress
2021	Mecca I'm Coming	Mrs. Ramah	Final film appearance

=== Television ===
Year	Title	Role	Notes	Network
1992–1993	Pelangi Dihatiku	Sandra	Lead role	RCTI
1994	Lika Liku Laki Laki		Won – 1994 Indonesian Film Festival for Best Comedy Leading Actress	RCTI
1997	Bidadari Yang Terluka	Mrs. Novia	Lead role	RCTI
2004	Rahasia Ilahi			TPI
2005	Khayalan Tingkat Tinggi		Supporting role	SCTV
2005–2006	Iman			SCTV
2006	Bunga Malam		Supporting role	RCTI
2012	Segalanya Cinta	Lany	Supporting role	MNCTV
2012–2013	Jagoan Silat	Mrs. Dinar	Supporting role	MNCTV

== Awards and nominations ==
Year	Awards	Category	Recipients	Results
1985	Indonesian Film Festival	Citra Award for Best Supporting Actress	Kembang Kertas	Nominated
1986	Indonesian Film Festival	Citra Award for Best Supporting Actress	Bila Saatnya Tiba	Nominated
1988	Indonesian Film Festival	Citra Award for Best Supporting Actress	Selamat Tinggal Jeanette	Won
1994	Indonesian Film Festival	Best Comedy Leading Actress	Lika Liku Laki Laki	Won
2003	Asia-Pacific Film Festival	Best Actress	Biola Tak Berdawai	Won
2004	MTV Indonesia Movie Awards	Most Favorite Actress	Biola Tak Berdawai	Nominated
2004	Indonesian Film Festival	Best Television Leading Actress	Rahasia Ilahi	Won
2006	MTV Indonesia Movie Awards	Most Favorite Supporting Actress	Berbagi Suami	Won
2006	Indonesian Film Festival	Citra Award for Best Supporting Actress	Berbagi Suami	Won
2007	Indonesian Movie Awards	Best Supporting Actress	Berbagi Suami	Nominated
2007	Indonesian Movie Awards	Favorite Supporting Actress	Berbagi Suami	Nominated
2015	Maya Awards	Best Actress in a Supporting Role	Bulan di Atas Kuburan	Won
2015	Indonesian Film Festival	Citra Award for Best Supporting Actress	Bulan di Atas Kuburan	Nominated
2016	Usmar Ismail Awards	Best Female Supporting Role	Bulan di Atas Kuburan	Nominated
2016	Indonesian Movie Awards	Favorite Supporting Actress	Bulan di Atas Kuburan	Nominated
2016	Indonesian Movie Awards	Best Supporting Actress	Bulan di Atas Kuburan	Won
2020	Indonesian Film Festival	Citra Award for Best Supporting Actress	Mekah I'm Coming	Nominated
