= Ririn Ekawati =

Indonesian actress & presenter

- Born: November 11, 1981 (age 44); Balikpapan, East Kalimantan, Indonesia
- Occupations: Celebrity, Model, Presenter
- Years active: 2000 - present
- Height: 160 cm (5 ft 3 in)
- Spouses: Edwin Abeng (m. 2001; div. 2008) Ferry Wijaya (m. 2015; died 2017) Ibnu Jamil (m. 2021)
- Children: 2
- Relatives: Rini Yulianti (sister)

Ririn Ekawati (born 11 November 1981) is an Indonesian actor, host, and model of Bugis descent. She started her career in modeling by finalist selection of Wajah Femina (English: Face of Femina) in 2000.

== Early life ==
Ririn Ekawati was born to parents from Tana Luwu, South Sulawesi. She grew up in Palu, Central Sulawesi and Balikpapan, East Kalimantan. Ririn Ekawati married Edwin Abeng, son of businessperson Tanri Abeng, on 13 October 2001, and had a daughter named Jasmine Salsabila Abeng who was born on 26 December 2003. They divorced in 2008. On 30 September 2015, Ririn Ekawati remarried to a businessman named Ferry Wijaya. From the marriage, they had a daughter named Abigail Cattleya Putri on 22 December 2016. on 11 June 2017, Ferry died at Pondok Indah Hospital, South Jakarta due to blood cancer or leukaemia that he had suffered a year earlier. She later remarried again to actor and football presenter Ibnu Jamil on 30 January 2021. Ibnu Jamil is a fan and supporter of England and Manchester United.

== Filmography ==
=== Films ===
Years	Titles	Roles	Ref.
2010	Roman Picisan	Widya	
2011	Rindu Purnama	Sarah	
2011	Serdadu Kumbang	Bu Guru Imbok	
2012	Di Timur Matahari	dr. Fatimah	
2013	Kisah 3 Titik	Titik Sulastri	
2015	Di Balik 98	Salma	
2015	Dejavu: Ajian Puter Giling	Myrna	
2018	Bodyguard Ugal-ugalan	Nina	
2022	Cinta Warung Sebelah	Ririn	original film of MAXstream
2023	Alena Anak Ratu Iblis	Maya	

=== Web series ===
Years	Titles	Roles	Channels
2019	Nawangsih	Kinar	MAXstream

=== Television series ===
Years	Titles	Roles	Ref.
2008 - 2009	Muslimah	Naysila	Debut
2009	Dibalik Jilbab Zaskia		
2010	Baghdad		

=== Film Televisions ===
- Katrok, I Love You (2012)
- Aku Hamil, Suami Punya Pacar (2013)
- Ustaz Juga Manusia
- Suami Selingkuh, Istri Menderita
- Kamu Tetap Suci
- Aku Menikahi Suami Pembohong
- Kurampas Kebahagiaan Saudara Kembarku
- Istriku Cantik, tapi Anakku Jelek
- Jangan Menangis Anakku
- Apa Salahku
- Istriku Bukan Istriku
- Aku Dibuang Suamiku Seperti Tisu Bekas

=== TV Programs ===
- Opera Van Java (Trans 7)
- Obras (Obrolan Santai) (Trans 7)
- Selebrita (Trans 7)
- Obsesi (Global TV)
- RinDu (Trans TV)
- Hexagon War (Trans7)
