= Pradikta Wicaksono =

- Also known as: Dikta
- Born: January 10, 1986 (age 40); Jakarta, Indonesia
- Genres: Pop
- Occupations: Singer, actor
- Instrument: Vocal
- Years active: 2007–present

Pradikta Wicaksono (born January 10, 1986), also known as Dikta, is an Indonesian singer and actor. He was a member of the pop-rock band Yovie & Nuno from 2007 to 2022 before launching a solo career. He also plays guitar for The Greytown Brothers, fronted by Jakarta-based bluesman Kongko Cadillac.^{[Citation needed]}

== Early life ==
Pradikta Wicaksono was born in Jakarta, Indonesia, on January 10, 1986. He was the second child of five siblings.

== Career ==
Wicaksono joined Yovie & Nuno in 2007, replacing vocalist Gail. During Wicaksono's 15 years with the band, Yovie & Nuno recorded three albums, two of which earned Anugerah Musik Indonesia (AMI) awards: The Special One won Best Album in 2009, and Winning 11 won Best Pop Album in 2011.

In June 2022, Wicaksono announced on Instagram that he was leaving Yovie & Nuno. He released his debut solo EP, Sendiri, on October 14, 2022.

== Discography ==
=== As Dikta Wicaksono ===
==== Albums ====
- Sendiri (2022)

=== As a member of Yovie & Nuno ===
==== Albums ====
- The Special One (2007)
- Winning Eleven (2010)
- Still The One (2015)

==== Singles ====
- Galau (2012)

== Filmography ==
Film
Year	Title	Role	Notes
2016	Romansa: Gending Cinta di Tanah Turki	Timmy	
2021	Love of Fate	Arjuna	
2021	Vidkill	Theo	
2024	Aku Jati, Aku Asperger	Daru	
2024	Bolehkah Sekali Saja Kumenangis	Baskara	
2026	Gudang Merica	Pria Ganteng	
Television
Year	Title	Role	Notes
2015–2016	Stereo	Vigo	2 seasons 50 episodes
2017	Cinta dan Rahasia	Rizky Langit Wibawa	2 seasons
2022	Indonesia Biner	Alex	6 episodes
2023	Cinta dua Masa	Langit	8 episodes

== See also ==
- Kahitna
- Yovie & Nuno
