= Nada Untuk Asa =

- Poster film
- Directed by: Charles Gozali
- Written by: Charles Gozali
- Produced by: Hendrick Gozali
- Starring: Marsha Timothy; Acha Septriasa; Darius Sinathriya; Mathias Muchus; Wulan Guritno; Nadilla Ernesta; Inong Ayu; Irgy Ahmad Fahrezy; Donny Damara; Butet Kartaredjasa; Tri Budiman; Pongki Barata; Bayu Oktara; Bisma Karisma; Aurelia Devi; Sakurta Ginting
- Cinematography: Harjono Parser
- Edited by: Charles Gozali
- Production company: Magma Entertainment
- Release date: 5 February 2015
- Running time: 98 minutes
- Country: Indonesia
- Language: Indonesian

Nada Untuk Asa is an Indonesian drama film directed by Charles Gozali released on February 5, 2015. The film stars Marsha Timothy, Acha Septriasa, Darius Sinathriya, Mathias Muchus, Wulan Guritno, Nadilla Ernesta, Irgy Ahmad Fahrezy, Donny Damara, Butet Kartaredjasa, and Pongki Barata.

Gozali was inspired to write the story by an episode of Mata Najwa titled "Hidup Dalam Stigma" that aired in October 2013. The film was nominated for "Favorite Film" at the 2015 Indonesian Movie Awards, but lost to Di Balik 98.

== Cast ==
- Marsha Timothy as Nada
- Acha Septriasa as Asa
- Darius Sinathriya as Wisnu
- Mathias Muchus as Mr. Karno
- Wulan Guritno as Wanda
- Inong Nindya Ayu as Lani
- Irgy Ahmad Fahrezy as Bobby
- Donny Damara as Dr. Arya
- Butet Kartaredjasa as Uncle David
- Tri Budiman as Aunt Nina
- Pongki Barata as himself
- Bayu Oktara as Buyung
- Aurelia Devi Noviaty as Julie
- Bisma Karisma as Student #1
- Sakurta Ginting as Student #2

== Awards and nominations ==
Year	Awards	Category	Recipients	Results
2015	Festival Film Bandung	Best Female Supporting Role	Acha Septriasa	Nominated
2015	Indonesian Movie Awards	Best Actress	Acha Septriasa	Nominated
2015	Indonesian Movie Awards	Best Actress	Marsha Timothy	Won
2015	Indonesian Movie Awards	Best Supporting Actor	Mathias Muchus	Nominated
2015	Indonesian Movie Awards	Special Award: Best Children Role	Mallaki Gruno	Nominated
2015	Indonesian Movie Awards	Favorite Actress	Acha Septriasa	Nominated
2015	Indonesian Movie Awards	Favorite Actress	Marsha Timothy	Won
2015	Indonesian Movie Awards	Favorite Soundtrack	Pongki Barata – "Seluas Itu" (Nada Untuk Asa)	Nominated
2015	Indonesian Movie Awards	Favorite Film	Nada Untuk Asa	Nominated
2015	Indonesian Film Festival	Best Leading Actress	Marsha Timothy	Nominated
2015	Indonesian Film Festival	Best Supporting Actress	Wulan Guritno	Nominated
2015	Maya Awards	Best Actress in a Leading Role	Marsha Timothy	Won
2015	Maya Awards	Best Original Screenplay	Charles Gozali	Nominated
2015	Maya Awards	Best Theme Song	Pongki Barata – "Seluas Itu" (Nada Untuk Asa)	Nominated
2015	Maya Awards	Best Film Review	Shandy Gasella, "Hidup Normal dan Tegar Bersama HIV/AIDS"	Nominated
2015	Maya Awards	Arifin C. Noer Awards (Non Effectively Brief Appearance)	Wulan Guritno	Won
