= The Crescent Moon (film) =

2015 drama film

- Promotional poster
- Directed by: Ismail Basbeth
- Screenplay by: Salman Aristo; Bagus Bramanti; Ismail Basbeth
- Produced by: Raam Punjabi; Hanung Bramantyo; Putut Widjanarko; Salman Aristo
- Starring: Deddy Sutomo; Oka Antara
- Cinematography: Satria Kurnianto
- Edited by: Wawan I. Wibowo
- Production companies: MVP Pictures; Studio Denny JA; Dapur Film; Argi Film; Mizan Productions
- Release date: 15 July 2015 (Indonesia)
- Running time: 93 minutes
- Country: Indonesia
- Language: Indonesian

The Crescent Moon (Indonesian: Mencari Hilal) is a 2015 road drama film directed by Ismail Basbeth from a screenplay he wrote with Salman Aristo and Bagus Bramanti. It stars Deddy Sutomo and Oka Antara.

The film was released in Indonesian theatres during the Eid al-Fitr week, on 15 July 2015. It received seven nominations at the Citra Awards, winning one for Best Actor for Sutomo.

== Premise ==
An estranged son accompanies his religiously strict father to seek the crescent moon that signals the start of Eid.

== Cast ==
- Deddy Sutomo as Mahmud
- Oka Antara as Heli
- Torro Margens as Arifin
- Erythrina Baskoro as Halida
- Rukman Rosadi as Daniel
- Gunawan Maryanto as Majid

== Production ==
The principal photography took place around Wonogiri Regency, Central Java and Yogyakarta for fourteen days.

== Release ==
The Crescent Moon was released in Indonesian theatres during the Eid al-Fitr week, on 15 July 2015, alongside Comic 8: Casino's King, Surga Yang Tak Dirindukan, and The Proposal. Compared to the three other films, it was considered as a box-office bomb, garnering approximately 12,000 admissions during its theatrical run. Producer Putut Widjanarko stated that the lack of promotion was one of the factors that caused the issue.

It also had its international premiere at the 28th Tokyo International Film Festival during the Asian Future section.

== Accolades ==
Award / Film Festival	Date of ceremony	Category	Recipient(s)	Result	Ref.
Indonesian Film Festival	23 November 2015	Best Picture	Raam Punjabi, Hanung Bramantyo, Putut Widjanarko, and Salman Aristo	Nominated	
Indonesian Film Festival	23 November 2015	Best Director	Ismail Basbeth	Nominated	
Indonesian Film Festival	23 November 2015	Best Actor	Deddy Sutomo	Won	
Indonesian Film Festival	23 November 2015	Best Original Screenplay	Salman Aristo, Bagus Bramanti, and Ismail Basbeth	Nominated	
Indonesian Film Festival	23 November 2015	Best Art Direction	Allan Sebastian	Nominated	
Indonesian Film Festival	23 November 2015	Best Film Editing	Wawan I. Wibowo	Nominated	
Indonesian Film Festival	23 November 2015	Best Original Score	Charlie Meliala	Nominated	
Maya Awards	19 December 2015	Best Feature Film	The Crescent Moon	Nominated	
Maya Awards	19 December 2015	Best Director	Ismail Basbeth	Nominated	
Maya Awards	19 December 2015	Best Actor	Deddy Sutomo	Won	
Maya Awards	19 December 2015	Best Supporting Actor	Oka Antara	Nominated	
Maya Awards	19 December 2015	Best Original Screenplay	Salman Aristo, Bagus Bramanti, and Ismail Basbeth	Nominated	
Maya Awards	19 December 2015	Best Film Editing	Wawan I. Wibowo	Nominated	
Maya Awards	19 December 2015	Best Theme Song	Sabrang Mowo Damar Panuluh and Charlie Meliala for "Mencari Hilal"	Nominated	
