= Panggabean =

Batak surname originating in Indonesia

Panggabean is one of Toba Batak clans originating in North Sumatra, Indonesia. People of this clan bear the clan's name as their surname. Notable people of this clan include:

- Lamtiur Andaliah Panggabean (1930–1993), Indonesian diplomat
- Mahyadi Panggabean (born 1982), Indonesian footballer
- Maraden Panggabean (1922–2000), Indonesian general
- Tika Panggabean (born 1970), Indonesian actress, singer and radio personality
