= Omesh =

Omesh is both a given name and a surname. Notable people with the name include:

- Omesh Kumar Bharti (fl. from 1992), Indian field epidemiologist
- Omesh Wijesiriwardene (born 1983), Sri Lankan cricketer
- Ananda Omesh (born 1986), Indonesian actor
