= Guru Bangsa: Tjokroaminoto =

2015 biographical drama film

- Promotional poster
- Directed by: Garin Nugroho
- Screenplay by: Ari Syarif; Erik Supit
- Story by: Ari Syarif; Erik Supit; Sabrang Mowo Damar Panuluh; Garin Nugroho; Kemal Pasha Hidayat
- Produced by: Christine Hakim; Dewi Umaya Rachman; Sabrang Mowo Damar Panuluh; Didi Petet; Nayaka Untara; Ari Syarif
- Starring: Reza Rahadian
- Cinematography: Ipung Rachmat Syaiful
- Music by: Andi Rianto
- Production companies: Yayasan Keluarga Besar HOS Tjokroaminoto; Picklock Production
- Release date: 9 April 2015 (Indonesia)
- Running time: 161 minutes
- Country: Indonesia
- Language: Indonesian

Guru Bangsa: Tjokroaminoto (lit. 'Teacher of the Nation: Tjokroaminoto') is a 2015 biographical drama film directed by Garin Nugroho. The screenplay was written by Ari Syarif dan Erik Supit from a story by Syarif, Supit, Sabrang Mowo Damar Panuluh, Nugroho, and Kemal Pasha Hidayat. It portrays the life of Indonesian nationalist Tjokroaminoto. It stars Reza Rahadian as the titular role.

It was released in Indonesian theatres on 9 April 2015. It was nominated for eight Citra Awards including Best Picture, winning three.

== Premise ==
The film follows Tjokroaminoto's life as he moves to Surabaya, where he co-founded Sarekat Islam to fight against the colonial regime of the Dutch East Indies.

== Cast ==
- Reza Rahadian as Tjokroaminoto
  - Christoffer Nelwan as young Tjokro
- Putri Ayudya as Soeharsikin
- Maia Estianty as Bu Mangoensoemo
- Christine Hakim as Mbok Tambeng
- Ibnu Jamil as Agus Salim
- Alex Komang as Hasan Ali Surati
- Tanta Ginting as Semaun
- Chelsea Islan as Stella
- Sudjiwo Tejo as Mangoensoemo
- Egi Fedly as Ibrahim Adji
- Deva Mahenra as Kusno/Soekarno
- Didi Petet as Haji Garut
- Ade Firman Hakim as Musso
- Alex Abbad as Abdullah
- Gunawan Maryanto as Cindil
- Rukman Rosadi as Haji Samanhudi
- Paul Agusta as Paul

== Production ==
The concept of creating Tjokroaminoto's biopic was conceived and proposed by his family. The development and research process took more than a year, due to limited references. Eventually, the research team pursued information all the way to Leiden, Netherlands to inquire with individuals who knew Tjokroaminoto personally. The principal photography began in September 2014 and took place in Ambarawa, Semarang, and Yogyakarta, including Gadjah Mada University. An area in Kalitirto, Yogyakarta was recreated to resemble Surabaya as it appeared in 1905.

== Release ==
The film was released in Indonesian theatres on 9 April 2015. It garnered 132,617 admissions during its theatrical run. Netflix acquired the film's distribution, releasing it on 11 November 2018.

== Accolades ==
Award / Film Festival	Date of ceremony	Category	Recipient(s)	Result	Ref.
Indonesian Film Festival	23 November 2015	Best Picture	Christine Hakim, Dewi Umaya Rachman, Sabrang Mowo Damar Panuluh, Nayaka Untara, Ari Syarif, and Didi Petet	Nominated	
Indonesian Film Festival	23 November 2015	Best Actor	Reza Rahadian	Nominated	
Indonesian Film Festival	23 November 2015	Best Original Screenplay	Ari Syarif and Erik Supit	Nominated	
Indonesian Film Festival	23 November 2015	Best Cinematography	Ipung Rachmat Syaiful	Won	
Indonesian Film Festival	23 November 2015	Best Art Direction	Allan Sebastian	Won	
Indonesian Film Festival	23 November 2015	Best Visual Effects	Satria Bhayangkara	Nominated	
Indonesian Film Festival	23 November 2015	Best Sound	Satrio Budiono and Trisno	Nominated	
Indonesian Film Festival	23 November 2015	Best Costume Design	Retno Ratih Damayanti	Won	
Maya Awards	19 December 2015	Best Feature Film	Guru Bangsa: Tjokroaminoto	Won	
Maya Awards	19 December 2015	Best Director	Garin Nugroho	Won	
Maya Awards	19 December 2015	Best Actor	Reza Rahadian	Nominated	
Maya Awards	19 December 2015	Tuti Indra Malaon Award for Best Breakthrough Actress	Putri Ayudya	Nominated	
Maya Awards	19 December 2015	Arifin C. Noer Award for Best Brief Appearance	Tumini	Nominated	
Maya Awards	19 December 2015	Best Original Screenplay	Ari Syarif and Erik Supit	Nominated	
Maya Awards	19 December 2015	Best Cinematography	Ipung Rachmat Syaiful	Won	
Maya Awards	19 December 2015	Best Film Editing	Wawan I. Wibowo	Nominated	
Maya Awards	19 December 2015	Best Art Direction	Allan Sebastian	Won	
Maya Awards	19 December 2015	Best Visual Effects	Satria Bhayangkara	Nominated	
Maya Awards	19 December 2015	Best Original Score	Andi Rianto	Won	
Maya Awards	19 December 2015	Best Sound	Satrio Budiono and Trisno	Won	
Maya Awards	19 December 2015	Best Costume Design	Retno Ratih Damayanti	Won	
Maya Awards	19 December 2015	Best Makeup and Hairstyling	Didin Syamsudin	Won	
