= Sophia Latjuba =

Indonesian actress based in the United States

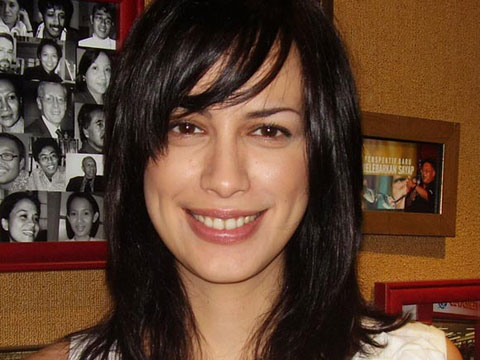
- Born: Sophia Inggriani Latjuba; 8 August 1970 (age 55); West Berlin, West Germany
- Other names: Sophia Latjuba , Sophia Müller
- Occupations: Actress singer
- Years active: 1987–present
- Spouses: Indra Lesmana (1992–1998); Michael Villareal (2005–2012)
- Children: 2, including Eva Celia
- Relatives: Mira Lesmana (sister-in-law)
- Awards: 1994 BASF Award for Best Album Arrangement

Sophia Inggriani Latjuba, known professionally as Sophia Latjuba (born 8 August 1970 ) is a German-born Indonesian actress and singer. Of German-Austria, Bugis and Javanese descent, she is the mother of actress and singer-songwriter, Eva Celia.

== Biography ==
Latjuba was born to Azzizurrahman Latjuba, a Bugis-Javanese and Anna Müller, a German-Austrian, on 8 August 1970. In youth, she moved back to Indonesia with her father; she later reported that she felt closer to him than her mother. She graduated from Senior High School 3 Jakarta.

Latjuba made her film debut in 1987 with Bilur-Bilur Penyesalan (Stripes of Regret), while still in high school. She later appeared in numerous films, culminating with Kuldesak, directed by her then-sister-in-law Mira Lesmana which she appeared in for free, in 1998. During her film career, Latjuba was considered a sex symbol; Bruce Edmond, writing for The Jakarta Post, described her as being "many an Indonesian man's fantasy woman" at the time. She also released several albums, including Hanya Untukmu (Only For You), which won the 1994 BASF Award for Best Album Arrangement.

When preparing his 2002 cover album Dekade (Decade), Chrisye approached Latjuba to perform two duets, "Kangen" ("Longing") and "Anggrek Bulan" ("Moon Orchid"), with him on the album; Latjuba accepted. She later performed in the Dekade Concert with him.

On 22 December 2008, Latjuba moved to Los Angeles, United States, citing rising intolerance in Indonesia and overcrowding in Jakarta. After taking a break from acting, she began auditioning for film roles in Los Angeles and taking acting classes to improve her professionalism. As of April 2012, she still lives in the city, in part because her daughter is studying performing arts there.

In October 2012, Latjuba had changed her name to Sophia Müller.

== Personal life ==
Latjuba's first marriage, in 1992, was to jazz pianist Indra Lesmana; the couple had one daughter, Eva Celia. Her second marriage, on 30 April 2005, was to American national Michael A. Villareal, with whom she has another daughter. After the couple was formally divorced in the United States, both legalized their divorce at the South Jakarta Civil Court and it was approved on 17 September 2014 by the judge.

Since 2008, Latjuba now resides in the United States. In a 2009 interview with The Jakarta Post, Latjuba stated that she had become a committed vegetarian and animal rights activist.

== Filmography ==
- Bilur-Bilur Penyesalan (Stripes of Regret; 1987)
- Rio Sang Juara (Rio the Champion; 1989)
- Valentine Kasih Sayang Bagimu (Valentine, Some Love For You; 1989)
- Ketika Cinta Telah Berlalu (When Love has Passed; 1989)
- Pengantin (Bride; 1990)
- Taksi Juga (Taxi Too; 1991)
- Catatan Si Boy V (Boy's Diary V; 1991)
- Kuldesak (1998)
- Tetangga Masa Gitu? (2014)
- " Comic 8 Casino Kings Part 1(2015)
- " Comic 8 Casino Kings Part 2(2016)
- Mereka Yang Tak Terlihat (2017)

== Discography ==
- Senyum Yang Hilang
- Lihat Saja Nanti
- Hanya Untukmu
- Hold On
- Kabut Di Kaki Langit
- Tak Kubiarkan
- Hola como tale tale vu (1, 2, 3)
