= The Wedding and Bebek Betutu =

The Wedding & Bebek Betutu
- Directed by: Hilman Mutasi
- Written by: Tantri Arinta; S. Tomo
- Produced by: Mieke Amalia; Steve Amidjojo; Tora Sudiro
- Starring: Tora Sudiro; Aming Sugandhi; Omesh; Sogi Indra Dhuaja; Tike Priatnakusumah; Edric Tjandra; Ence Bagus; Ibob Tarigan; Mieke Amalia; Ronal Surapradja; Adinda Thomas; Tj Ruth; Indra Birowo; Virnie Ismail; Marcel Chandrawinata; Kiena Dwita
- Cinematography: Yunus Pasolang
- Edited by: Yoga Krispratama
- Production company: Awan Sinema Kreasi
- Release date: October 8, 2015 (Indonesia)
- Country: Indonesia
- Language: Bahasa Indonesia

The Wedding & Bebek Betutu is an Indonesian comedy film produced by Awan Sinema Kreasi (ASIK Production) and directed by Hilman Mutasi, based on original screenplay written by Tantri Arinta and S. Tomo.

The cast consists mainly of actors and comedians previously renowned as regular performers in a popular Indonesian television comedy variety show, Extravaganza, including Tora Sudiro, Ronal Surapradja, Tike Priatnakusumah, Indra Birowo, Aming Sugandhi, Virnie Ismail, Rony Dozer, Sogi Indra Dhuaja, Mieke Amalia, Omesh, Tj Ruth, Ence Bagus, and Edric Tjandra. The Wedding & Bebek Betutu is the first single project where mostly all the performers reunite and appear together since the show ended in 2009.

The film was announced in a special gathering of the cast, held in a restaurant in South Jakarta area, on February 18, 2015. Filming started on February 23, 2015 in the city of Bandung, West Java, and its outskirts, and concluded on March 18, 2015.

The Wedding & Bebek Betutu was released in Indonesia on October 8, 2015.

== Synopsis ==
A group of hotel employees known as "The Crew" are trying hard to save the wedding of their boss' only daughter, mainly due to some blackmailing problems as well as a non-rejectable demand for a special bebek betutu (Balinese roasted duck) recipe, all of which must be resolved in 24 hours.

== Cast ==
- Tora Sudiro as Januar Edwin, the hotel's chef
- Aming Sugandhi as Tingtong, the wedding organizer
- Omesh as Bagas Wicaksono, the bridegroom
- Sogi Indra Dhuaja as Angga Wijaya, the hotel's banquet manager
- Tike Priatnakusumah as Kokom Komalasari, the hotel's housekeeping
- Edric Tjandra as Mayo Meositta, the hotel's concierge
- Ence Bagus as Muhammad Ikhsan, the hotel's handyman
- Ibob Tarigan as Iwan Kurniawan, the hotel's Doorman
- Mieke Amalia as Rani Sastranegara, the bride's mother
- Ronal Surapradja as Rama Sastranegara, the bride's father
- Adinda Thomas as Lana Sastranegara, the bride
- Tj Ruth as Tuti Wicaksono, the bridegroom's mother
- Indra Birowo as Edo Wicaksono, the bridegroom's father
- Virnie Ismail as Tantri, the wedding equipment vendor
- Marcel Chandrawinata as Alex Handi, the bride's ex-boyfriend
- Kiena Dwita as Lisa Soerjo, the bride's cousin
- Rony Dozer as Aam Khanam, another wedding organizer
- Muhammad Fachroni as Kang Peppa
- Erwin Moron as a vegetable seller
- Ery Makmur as a police officer

The film also features some cameos primarily of Bandung's iconic public figures, most notably of which is by the Mayor Ridwan Kamil, who briefly appears as himself. Others include comedian Joe P-Project, comedian and TV presenter Muhammad Farhan, social and cultural activist Budi Dalton, rock musician Stevie Item, as well as actor and musician Eza Yayang.

== Production ==
=== Development ===
"... it was in our small reunion at some time in the month of Ramadhan about two years ago that the idea to do something together again was first brought up. Back then, we were still unclear about what the project would be and yet all of us stayed in touch while maintaining the hopes for a reuniting work. Then the opportunity came when Mieke and I met an investor who happened to be a great fan of Extravaganza and insisted on a movie project that would involve most, if not all, performers of the show. So we went on to establish ASIK Production to turn this movie project into reality"

— Tora Sudiro, on how the idea for the movie was conceived.

=== Filming ===
Filming commenced on February 23, 2015 at GH Universal, a 105-room five-star hotel with Italian Renaissance architecture located in the northern part of Bandung. The hotel also serves as the main setting of the story. Aside from the hotel, filming also took place around downtown Bandung, as well as some notable places of the city's immediate surroundings, including at the lake Patenggang in Ciwidey, Bandung Regency. Filming was wrapped on March 18, 2015.

== Release ==
The Wedding & Bebek Betutu was scheduled to be released in Indonesia on October 8, 2015.
