= Lights from the East: I Am Maluku =

2014 Indonesian film

- Film poster
- Cahaya dari Timur: Beta Maluku
- Directed by: Angga Dwimas Sasongko
- Written by: Angga Dwimas Sasongko; Irfan Ramly; Swastika Nohara
- Produced by: Angga Dwimas Sasongko; Glenn Fredly
- Starring: Chicco Jerikho; Shafira Umm; Abdurrahman Arif; Burhanuddin Ohorella; Aufa Assagaf; Bebeto Leutually; Jajang C. Noer
- Cinematography: Roby Taswin
- Edited by: Yoga Krispratama
- Music by: Nikita Dompas
- Production company: Visinema Pictures
- Release date: 17 June 2014 (Indonesia)
- Running time: 151 minutes
- Country: Indonesia
- Languages: Indonesian; Ambonese

Lights from the East: I Am Maluku (Indonesian: Cahaya dari Timur: Beta Maluku) is a 2014 Indonesian sports drama film written, directed, and produced by Angga Dwimas Sasongko. The film stars Chicco Jerikho, Shafira Uum, Abdurrahman Arif, and Jajang C. Noer.

The film was well received and won several awards, including the Citra Award for Best Picture and the Maya Award for Best Feature Film. Jerikho's performance as a former soccer player helping kids avoid sectarian conflicts through soccer won praise and garnered him the Citra Award for Best Actor, the Maya Award for Best Actor in a Leading Role, and the Indonesian Movie Awards for both Best Actor and Favorite Actor.

== Synopsis ==
After witnessing a child's death during a violent clash, a former soccer player launches a youth team to help local kids avoid further bloodshed.

== Cast ==
- Chicco Jerikho as Sani Tawainella, a former soccer player
- Shafira Uum as Haspa Umarella
- Abdurrahman Arif as Yosef Matulessy
- Burhanuddin Ohorella as Alfin Tuasalamony
- Bebeto Leutually as Salim Ohorella
- Jajang C. Noer as Alfin's mother
- Glenn Fredly as Sufyan Lestaluhu

== Awards and nominations ==
Year	Awards	Category	Recipients	Result
2014	34th Citra Awards	Best Picture	Lights from the East: I Am Maluku	Won
2014	34th Citra Awards	Best Actor	Chicco Jerikho	Won
2014	34th Citra Awards	Best Supporting Actress	Jajang C. Noer	Nominated
2014	34th Citra Awards	Best Adapted Screenplay	Angga Dwimas Sasongko Irfan Ramly Swastika Nohara	Nominated
2014	34th Citra Awards	Best Cinematography	Roby Taswin	Nominated
2014	34th Citra Awards	Best Editing	Yoga Krispratama	Nominated
2014	34th Citra Awards	Best Art Direction	Yusuf Kaisuku	Nominated
2014	34th Citra Awards	Best Sound	Djoko Setiadi Satrio Budiono	Nominated
2014	3rd Maya Awards	Best Feature Film	Lights from the East: I Am Maluku	Won
2014	3rd Maya Awards	Best Director	Angga Dwimas Sasongko	Won
2014	3rd Maya Awards	Best Actor in a Leading Role	Chicco Jerikho	Won
2014	3rd Maya Awards	Best New Actress	Shafira Uum	Nominated
2014	3rd Maya Awards	Best Young Performer	Bebeto Leutually	Won
2014	3rd Maya Awards	Best Original Screenplay	Angga Dwimas Sasongko Irfan Ramly Swastika Nohara	Won
2014	3rd Maya Awards	Best Theme Song	"Tinggikan" by Glenn Fredly	Won
2014	3rd Maya Awards	Best Original Score	Nikita Dompas	Won
2014	3rd Maya Awards	Best Editing	Yoga Krispratama	Nominated
2014	3rd Maya Awards	Arifin C. Noer Award for Memorable Brief Appearance	Norman Akyuwen	Won
2015	9th Indonesian Movie Awards	Best Actor	Chicco Jerikho	Won
2015	9th Indonesian Movie Awards	Best Supporting Actress	Jajang C. Noer	Nominated
2015	9th Indonesian Movie Awards	Best New Performer	Bebeto Leutually	Won
2015	9th Indonesian Movie Awards	Favorite Film	Lights from the East: I Am Maluku	Nominated
2015	9th Indonesian Movie Awards	Favorite Actor	Chicco Jerikho	Won
2015	9th Indonesian Movie Awards	Favorite New Performer	Bebeto Leutually	Nominated
2015	9th Indonesian Movie Awards	Favorite Soundtrack	"Tinggikan" by Glenn Fredly	Nominated
2015	ASEAN International Film Festival	Best Film	Lights from the East: I Am Maluku	Nominated
2015	ASEAN International Film Festival	Best Actor	Chicco Jerikho	Nominated
2015	ASEAN International Film Festival	Best Supporting Actress	Jajang C. Noer	Nominated
