= Jefri Al Buchori =

Indonesian Islamic preacher, singer, and actor (1973–2013)

Ustad Muhammad Jefri Al Buchori
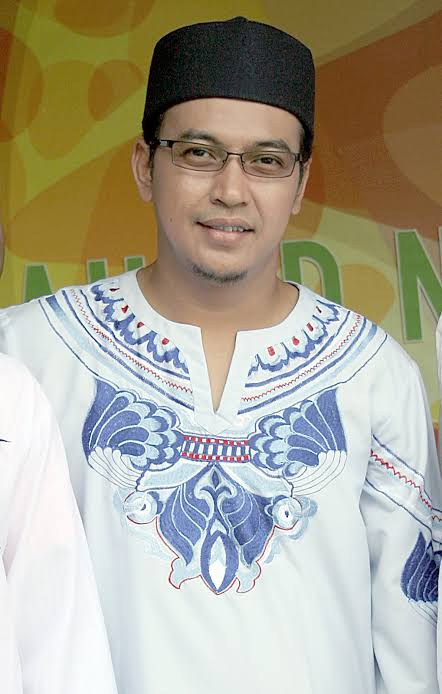
- Born: Jefri Al Buchori; 12 April 1973; Jakarta, Indonesia
- Died: 26 April 2013 (aged 40); Jakarta, Indonesia
- Other names: Uje, Ustadz Uje
- Occupations: Islamic preacher, da'i, Islamic musician, actor, dancer
- Spouse: Pipik Dian Irawati (m. 1999)
- Children: 4
- Parent(s): H. Ismail Modal; Dra. Hj. Tatu Mulyana
- Relatives: Egy Maulana Vikri (son-in-law)

Muhammmad Jefri Al Buchori (12 April 1973 – 26 April 2013), colloquially known as Uje – stands for Ustad Jefri, was an Indonesian Islamic preacher, da'i, singer, and actor. He was known as an Islamic preacher with young and charismatic charm and who frequently appeared on pop culture scene.

== Early life ==
Jefri was born in Jakarta, the third son of his father Ismail Modal who was a Moluccan, and his mother Tatu Mulyana. Based on his interview with Gatra, he spent his childhood in Pangeran Jayakarta area where the surrounding neighborhoods contained many bars and discos. During the elementary school years at 07 Karang Anyar, Jefri never felt the need for the grade 4 thus he jumped class from grade 3 to class 5. Since childhood age he had shown an interest in religious and artistic subjects. At the elementary school, Jefri and his siblings attended the modern pesantren at Daar el Qolam Gintung, Balaraja, Tangerang, but he only attended four years of graduate schooling, and later transferred to the madrasah aliyah (higher Islamic educational institution) for unhealthy behavior. During this time, Jefri had already shown his talent in performance with reaching the provincial level tournament at the Musabaqah Tilawatil Quran.

His youth was often riddled with drug abuse, disco, and playing billiard games. "I was the demon's work in the world" once confessed Jefri at the interview. After graduating the madrasah aliyah, he went on to the broadcasting academy in Rawamangun, Jakarta, but did not finish the college due to excessively playing billiards.

During this age, he suffered from drug addiction. Recovering from drug addiction, Jefri met Pipik Dian Irawati, who hailed from Semarang, Central Java and working for the magazine cover girl for Aneka magazine in 1995, and married on 7 September 1999. This marriage was then inaugurated in Semarang two months later. The couple had four children, two sons and two daughters: Adiba Khanza Az-Zahra; born in 2000, Mohammad Abidzar Al-Ghifari; born in 2001, Ayla Azuhro; born in 2007, and Attaya Bilal Rizkillah; born in 2008.

== Career ==
=== Acting ===
Jefri's career as an actor stemmed from his passion in visiting the Jakarta Arts Institute. He began his acting career on soap operas. During the same time, he also became a dancer in a nightclub. In 1991 Jefri gained a role in the soap opera Halilintar in the national television TVRI, and in 1991 was selected as the best male actor of the week on TVRI.

=== Televangelism ===
Jefri's career in da'wah began in 2000 when he succeeded his elder sister at a mosque in Singapore. Her sister's work was delivering a sermon at the mosques near the house in Pangeran Jayakarta, and this was given to Jefri. He received the honorarium for his da'wah for the first time by the mosque in Mangga Dua with 35 thousand rupiah. On one occasion as a priest though, worshipers dismissed the mosque, as they disliked being led by a perceived drunkard.

Jefri as a preacher became widely known in 2002 for lectures and prayers in the Salam Sahur (Salsa) event on the national television TV7 (former Trans7), and was contracted for the same event the following year. In 2004 he began performing tausiyah (broadcasting of da'wah) on TPI (former MNCTV) and gained seven episodes of Kumis Remaja (lit: Teenage Mustache) on Sunday mornings.

At first, Jefri was dressed in a long robe complete with a turban, but then he replaced the outfit in order to accommodate his audience which was the younger segment. He was also popular with his koko shirt and became a common trademark for the merchants to popularize the attire.

In 2005 his lecture activities reached three to four times a day and regular recitation of "I Like Monday" at his home with a constant congregation. In the same year, he was asked to give a lecture at the State Palace by the incumbent president of Indonesia Susilo Bambang Yudhoyono who was among his fans.

=== Music ===
In 2005, Jefri released the spiritual musical album Lahir Kembali (Born Again), then in 2006 he released his second album Shalawat in which he composed a duet with his wife Pipik in two songs; "Shalawat Badar" and "Thola`al Badru". In 2007 he collaborated on the mini album Para Pencari-Mu (The Seekers) with the musical group Ungu, in the song "Surga Hati" (Heaven of the Soul). In 2009 he performed a duet at the Tabligh Akbar and Ungu Religious Music Concert in Cilegon, Banten, attended by thousands of spectators.

== Death ==
Jefri died at the age of 40 on 26 April 2013 in a road accident in Pondok Indah area, South Jakarta, at 02:00 Western Indonesian Time (19:00 UTC, 25 April). He crashed into the tree after losing control of his motorbike Kawasaki ER-6n. He was sent to the Pondok Indah Hospital and Fatmawati Hospital but was pronounced dead after efforts to revive him failed. Subsequently, his body was brought to a funeral home in Perum Bukit Mas, East Ciputat, South Tangerang. He was buried in TPU Karet Bivak, Tengsin, Central Jakarta after the prayer at Istiqlal Mosque which attended by thousands of mourners.

== Magazine Articles ==
- Femina Magazine (13–19 October 2005, Serial Baru)
- Femina Magazine (27 April – 3 May 2013, Serial Baru: Ustadz Jefri Dalam Kenangan)
