= Chicco Jerikho =

Indonesian actor and film producer (born 1984)

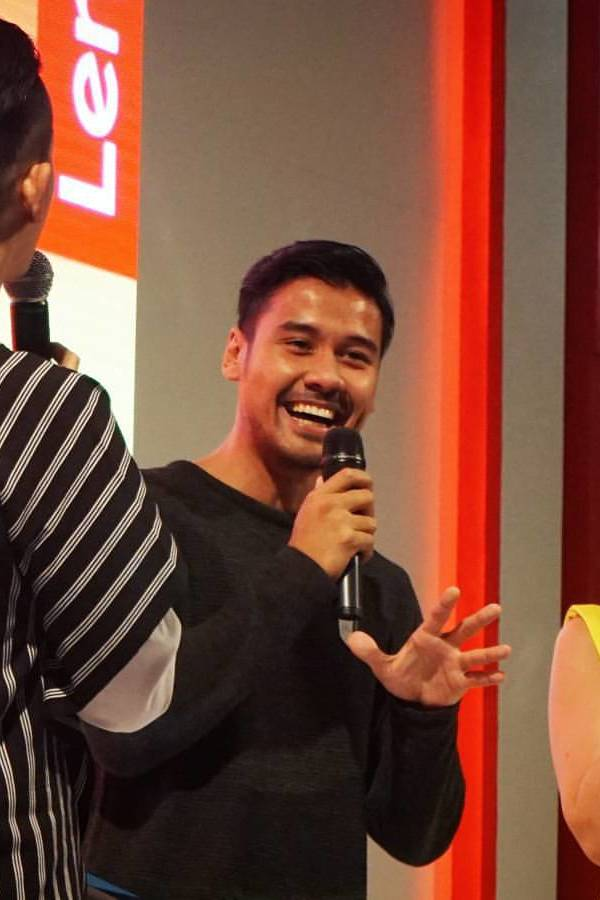
- Jerikho in 2015
- Born: Chicco Jerikho Jarumillind; 3 July 1984 (age 41); Jakarta, Indonesia
- Occupations: Actor; film producer
- Years active: 2000–present
- Spouse: Putri Marino (m. 2018)

Chicco Jerikho Jarumillind (born 3 July 1984) is an Indonesian actor and film producer. In 2014, he received the Citra Award for Best Actor for his performance as Sani Tawainella in Lights from the East: I Am Maluku.

== Early life ==
Chicco Jerikho Jarumillind was born in Jakarta on 3 July 1984 to a Thai father and Batak mother of Panggabean clan.

== Career ==
Jerikho started his career by participating in a cover boy competition held by teen magazine Aneka Yess! in 2000. In his early acting career, he frequently starred in soap operas, most notably SCTV's Cinta Bunga in 2007. He made his feature film acting debut as an extra in 2007 horror film Lawang Sewu: Dendam Kuntilanak.

In 2014, he starred as Sani Tawainella, a former football player, in biographical sports drama Lights from the East: I Am Maluku. His performance in the film earned him the Citra Award for Best Actor at the 2014 Indonesian Film Festival. In 2015, he starred as Ben Soesilo, a barista in Angga Dwimas Sasongko's adaptation of Dewi Lestari's Filosofi Kopi. He also served as a co-producer for the film. Jerikho starred as Alex, a pirate DVDs subtitler, in Joko Anwar's A Copy of My Mind, which had its world premiere at the 72nd Venice International Film Festival.

In 2016, he made his producing debut and starred in Sasongko's Letters from Prague. The film was selected as the Indonesian entry for the Best Foreign Language Film at the 89th Academy Awards but it was not nominated. In 2017, he reprised his role as Ben in the sequel, Filosofi Kopi 2: Ben & Jody. In 2018, he starred as Romo Yosef, a Catholic priest involved in a romantic relationship with a nun in romantic drama film Ave Maryam. Jerikho starred in English-language science fiction film Foxtrot Six. In 2019, it was announced that Jerikho would portray Godam in the Bumilangit Cinematic Universe, making his debut appearance in a mid-credit scene of Sri Asih (2022). In 2022, he starred in the Indonesian remake of Doctor Foster, Mendua as Ivan Atmajaya.

== Personal life ==
On 3 March 2018, Jerikho married actress and model Putri Marino in Bali. Their daughter, Surinala, was born in September 2018.

Along with director Angga Dwimas Sasongko, actor Rio Dewanto, writer Dewi Lestari, producers Anggia Kharisma and Handoko Hendroyono, Jerikho opened a coffee shop, Filosofi Kopi, inspired by the film they worked on.

== Filmography ==
Year	Title	Role	Notes
2007	Lawang Sewu: Dendam Kuntilanak	Guy at the Club	
2008	In the Name of Love	Krisna	
2008	Merem Melek	Tito	
2014	Lights from the East: I Am Maluku	Sani Tawainella	
2014	Seputih Cinta Melati	Ivan	
2015	Filosofi Kopi the Movie	Ben Soesilo	Also co-producer
2015	Negeri Van Oranje	Gery	
2015	A Copy of My Mind	Alex	
2016	Letters from Prague	Rama	Also producer
2016	Chaotic Love Poems	Rumi	
2016	The Postman and Kartini	Sarwadi	
2016	Terjebak Nostalgia	Reza	
2017	Bukaan 8	Alam	Also producer
2017	Filosofi Kopi the Movie 2: Ben & Jody	Ben Soesilo	Also producer
2018	Ave Maryam	Romo Yosef	
2018	Love for Sale	—	As producer
2019	Foxtrot Six	Spec	
2019	Too Handsome to Handle	—	As executive producer
2020	One Day We'll Talk About Today	Anton Irianto	
2021	Aum!	Panca Kusuma Negara	
2021	A World Without	Ali Khan	
2022	Ben & Jody	Ben Soesilo	Also producer
2022	Jakarta, City of Dreamers	Himself	
2022	Sri Asih	Awang / Godam	Mid-credit scene
2022	Mendua	Ivan Atmajaya	TV series
2023	13 Bombs in Jakarta	ICTA inspection officer	
2024	Heartbreak Motel	Raga Assad	
2025	This City Is a Battlefield	Isa	
