= Siti (film) =

2014 film by Eddie Cahyono

- Film poster
- Directed by: Eddie Cahyono
- Written by: Eddie Cahyono
- Produced by: Ifa Isfansyah
- Starring: Sekar Sari; Bintang Timur Widodo; Titi Dibyo; Ibnu Widodo; Haydar Saliz; Noel Kefas
- Cinematography: Ujel Bausad
- Production company: fourcolours films
- Release dates: December 2014 (Jogja-NETPAC Asian Film Festival); January 28, 2016
- Running time: 91 minutes
- Country: Indonesia
- Language: Indonesian

Siti is a 2014 Indonesian drama film directed by Eddie Cahyono. The film first aired in 2014 at the Jogja-NETPAC Asian Film Festival, and was later widely distributed in 2016. The film won three awards at the Indonesian Film Festival in 2015.

== Accolades ==
Award	Year	Category	Recipient	Result
Shanghai International Film Festival	2015	Best Cinematography	Ujel Bausad	Nominated
Shanghai International Film Festival	2015	Best Screenplay	Eddie Cahyono	Won
Apresiasi Film Indonesia	2015	Best Fiction Film	Ifa Isfansyah	Won
Apresiasi Film Indonesia	2015	Best Movie Poster		Won
Indonesian Film Festival	2015	Best Original Screenplay Writer	Eddie Cahyono	Won
Indonesian Film Festival	2015	Best Original Score	Krisna Purna	Won
Indonesian Film Festival	2015	Best Cinematography	Ujel Bausad	Nominated
Indonesian Film Festival	2015	Best Director	Eddie Cahyono	Nominated
Indonesian Film Festival	2015	Best Film	Ifa Isfansyah	Won
Singapore International Film Festival	2015	Best Performance - Asian Feature Film	Sekar Sari	Won
