= The Golden Cane Warrior =

- Theatrical release poster
- Directed by: Ifa Isfansyah
- Written by: Jujur Prananto
- Story by: Mira Lesmana; Riri Riza; Ifa Isfansyah; Eddie Cahyono
- Produced by: Mira Lesmana; Riri Riza
- Starring: Eva Celia; Nicholas Saputra; Reza Rahadian; Tara Basro; Christine Hakim; Slamet Rahardjo; Aria Kusumah; Darius Sinathrya; Prisia Nasution
- Music by: Erwin Gutawa
- Production companies: Miles Films; Kompas Gramedia Studios
- Distributed by: Miles Films; Well Go USA Entertainment (United States)
- Release date: 18 December 2014
- Running time: 112 minutes
- Countries: Indonesia; Hong Kong
- Languages: Indonesian; Cantonese
- Budget: Rp 25 billion (US$2 million)

The Golden Cane Warrior (Indonesian: Pendekar Tongkat Emas), is an Indonesian martial-arts film. It was released in 2014, directed by Ifa Isfansyah, produced by Mira Lesmana and Riri Riza of Miles Films and stars Eva Celia, Nicholas Saputra, Reza Rahadian, Tara Basro, Christine Hakim, Slamet Rahardjo, and Prisia Nasution.

The film revived the historical silat genre which had been absent in previous years of Indonesian cinema. While it depicts martial arts and violence, the film also explores themes such as loyalty, integrity, ambition, and betrayal.

== Plot ==
Cempaka is a silat master known as the Golden Cane Warrior. She had four disciples: Biru, Gerhana, Dara and Angin; all of whom are children of enemies she defeated. In deteriorating health, Cempaka names Dara as her successor, but before teaching Dara her ultimate technique Cempaka is ambushed by Biru and Gerhana who want her powerful Golden Cane for themselves. Cempaka fights them to her death, allowing time for Dara and Angin to flee.

Biru and Gerhana pursue Dara and Angin, who fall from a cliff during a fight and are saved by a mysterious man called Elang. Dara and Angin decide to seek Cempaka's former partner, the White Dragon Warrior, who could teach Dara the ultimate technique of the golden cane. However, Elang says they are not yet ready. Tricked into thinking Dara and Angin are responsible for Cempaka's death, the Red Wing Warriors capture Angin. Dara trades the Golden Cane to Biru and Gerhana for Angin's release, but they break the deal and Angin is killed saving Dara.

Biru and Gerhana take over the Red Wing Warriors by poisoning their leader, in the same manner that they had poisoned Cempaka. Dara sneaks into their compound to avenge Angin and Cempaka, but Elang intervenes, believing she is not yet ready to fight them. Elang apologizes for not helping, being honour bound not to have anything to do with Cempaka. He is revealed to be the son of Cempaka and the White Dragon Warrior, who is now dead, leaving Elang the only person who knows the ultimate technique. The technique can only be performed by two warriors, and Dara realizes that Angin was intended to be trained alongside her. Breaking the promise to his father and the advice of the high council, Elang agrees to take Dara as his disciple. Meanwhile, Biru and Gerhana transform the Red Wing Warriors into the Golden Cane Warriors, and become lovers.

Some time later, Dara and Elang invade the compound and, denied a peaceful surrender of the Golden Cane, challenge Biru and Gerhana to fight. Dara pauses from fighting when Gerhana's daughter walks out, not wanting to traumatize her; Gerhana uses the incident to catch Dara off-guard but Dara kills her. Biru becomes enraged and blindly attacks but falls from a blow, allowing Dara to retrieve the Golden Cane. In its place, Biru attacks them with a tree trunk. However, Dara and Elang spin with the Golden Cane, performing its ultimate technique which kills Biru with a single blow.

Dara and Elang kiss and embrace, admitting their feelings. However, the next morning Elang departs and talks to the leader of the high council, his uncle, submitting to punishment for breaking his promise. Dara returns to Cempaka's old barn and teaches martial arts to Biru and Gerhana's daughter, continuing Cempaka's tradition.

== Cast ==
The main cast are (with Chinese names):

- Eva Celia as Dara (達拉)
- Nicholas Saputra as Elang (鷹光)
- Reza Rahadian as Biru (比魯)
- Tara Basro as Gerhana (日食)
- Aria Kusumah as Angin (風雲.)
- Christine Hakim as Cempaka (酒店)
- Slamet Rahardjo as High Council Leader (高級議會領袖)
- Darius Sinathrya as The White Dragon Warrior (白龍)
- Prisia Nasution as Young Cempaka (小酒店)
- Whani Darmawan as Master of the Red Wing Warriors (紅翼戰士大師.)

== Production ==
The film was directed by Ifa Isfansyah, who previously received critical acclaim for his direction of Sang Penari. Mira Lesmana and Riri Riza of Miles Films received credits for producing. The filming process took place in East Sumba, East Nusa Tenggara for three months. Jujur Prananto, known for writing the commercially successful Ada Apa dengan Cinta? and Ungu Violet, is credited for his screenplay with the story developed by Mira Lesmana, Riri Riza, Ifa Isfansyah, and Eddie Cahyono.

Chitra Subiakto was credited as the designer; while renowned musician, Erwin Gutawa, provided the music for the film. Indonesian-born French-naturalized singer Anggun provided vocals for the theme song "Fly My Eagle" which contains lyrics in both Indonesian and English.

Reza Rahadian, who played the role of Biru, went through seven months of rigorous physical and martial-arts training to prepare for the film. It was rumored that Rahadian was highly paid to appear in the movie, prompting local media outlets to name him the most-expensive actor in Indonesia. However, Rahadian himself had personally disclosed that this was not the case.

The film's estimated Rp 25 billion budget, or approximately US$2 million, was considered a fantastic figure for an Indonesian production.
