= Toba Dreams =

- Film poster
- Directed by: Benni Setiawan
- Written by: TB Silalahi
- Produced by: Rizaludin Kurniawan
- Starring: Ajil Ditto; Mathias Muchus; Marsha Timothy; Vino G. Bastian; Boris Bokir; Vinessa Inez
- Production company: TB Silalahi Center
- Distributed by: Semesta Cinema
- Release date: 30 April 2015
- Country: Indonesia
- Language: Bahasa Indonesia

Toba Dreams is an Indonesian film adapted from the novel of the same title essay T.B. Silalahi.

== Cast ==
- Vino G. Bastian as Ronggur
- Marsha Timothy as Andini
- Mathias Muchus as Sergeant TB Silalahi
- Ajil Ditto as Teddy
- Jajang C. Noer as Opung Boru
- Haykal Kamil as Samurung
- Vinessa Inez as Taruli
- Boris Bokir as Tigor
