= Behind 98 =

- Directed by: Lukman Sardi
- Starring: Chelsea Elizabeth Islan; Boy William; Alya Rohali; Arief Lufti Novembris; Fauzi Baadilla; Verdi Solaiman; Donny Alamsyah; Ririn Ekawati; Teuku Rifnu Wikana; Bima Azriel
- Production company: MNC Corporation/MNC Pictures
- Release date: January 15, 2015
- Country: Indonesia
- Language: Indonesian

Behind 98, also known as formerly Di Balik Pintu Istana ("Behind the Palace Door"), is an Indonesian drama film directed by Lukman Sardi, starring Chelsea Islan and Boy William. It was released on January 15, 2015. The film is themed around the fall of Suharto in 1998.

== Cast ==
- Chelsea Elizabeth Islan as Diana
- Boy William as Daniel
- Ririn Ekawati as Salma
- Alya Rohali as Bunda Alya
- Fauzi Baadila as Rahman
- Verdi Solaiman as Karumga
- Donny Alamsyah as Bagus
- Amoroso Katamsi as Suharto
- Teuku Rifnu Wikana as Rahmat
- Bima Azriel as Gandung
- Dian Sidik as Wiranto
- Agus Kuncoro as B. J. Habibie
- Pandji Pragiwaksono as Susilo Bambang Yudhoyono
- Asrul Dahlan as Sintong Panjaitan
- Iang Darmawan as Harmoko
- Dili Syaukat as Prabowo Subianto
- Eduwary Manalu as Amien Rais
