= Maya Award for Best Feature Film =

Annual Indonesian film award

- Awarded for: Best Feature Film of the Year
- Country: Indonesia
- First award: 2012
- Currently held by: Aisyah: Biarkan Kami Bersaudara (2016)
- Website: pialamaya.com

The Maya Award for Best Feature Film is one of the Maya Awards presented annually since the awards debuted in 2012, that is initiated by FILM_Indonesia Twitter account. Best Feature Film is the final award at every Maya Awards ceremony.

The nominations and winners of the awards are selected by a panel of judges consisting of Indonesian film critics and filmmakers, including directors, actors, and actresses.

== Winners and nominees ==
For the first ceremony of the award, eight films were nominated. The number expanded to ten films the following year before being dropped back to eight films from the third ceremony until now.

indicates the winner

=== 2010s ===
Year	Film	Director(s)	Producer(s)	Production Company(es)
2012	Lovely Man *	Teddy Soeriaatmadja	Teddy Soeriaatmadja, Adiyanto Sumarjono, Indra Tamoron Musu	Karuna Pictures
2012	Arisan! 2	Nia Dinata	Nia Dinata	Kalyana Shira Films, Mira Media Group, Ezy Productions, Add Word Productions
2012	Cita-Citaku Setinggi Tanah	Eugene Panji	Eugene Panji	Humanplus Production
2012	Mata Tertutup	Garin Nugroho	Asaf Antariksa, Endang Tirtana	SET Film, Maarif Production
2012	Postcards from the Zoo	Edwin	Meske Taurisia	Babibutafilm, Pallas Film
2012	The Raid: Redemption	Gareth Evans	Ario Sagantoro	PT. Merantau Films, XYZ Films
2012	Rayya, Cahata di Atas Cahaya	Viva Westi	Dewi Umaya Rachman, Sabrang Mowo Damar Panuluh	Pic[k]lock Production, Menara Alisya Multimedia
2012	Tanah Surga... Katanya	Herwin Novianto	Bustal Nawawi	Brajamusti Films, PT Demi Gisela Citra Sinema
2013	Sokola Rimba *	Riri Riza	Mira Lesmana	Miles Films
2013	9 Summers 10 Autumns	Ifa Isfansyah	Arya Pradana, Edwin Nazir	Angka Fortuna Sinema
2013	Belenggu	Upi	Upi, Frederica	Falcon Pictures
2013	Finding Srimulat	Charles Gozali	Hendrick Gozali	MagMa Entertainment
2013	Hari Ini Pasti Menang	Andibachtiar Yusuf	Mega Setiawati Widjaja	Bogalakon Pictures, Yusuf/Widjaja Productions
2013	Habibie & Ainun	Faozan Rizal	Dhamoo Punjabi, Manoj Punjabi	MD Pictures
2013	Laura & Marsha	Dinna Jasanti	Leni Lolang	Inno Maleo Films
2013	Noah: Awal Semula	Putrama Tuta	Putrama Tuta	700 Pictures, Berlian Entertainment, Musica Studio's
2013	Something in the Way	Teddy Soeriaatmadja	Teddy Soeriaatmadja, Indra Tamoron Musu	Karuna Pictures
2013	What They Don't Talk About When They Talk About Love	Mouly Surya	Parama Wirasmo, Tia Hasibuan, Fauzan Zidni, Ninin Musa	Cinesurya Pictures, Amalina Pictures
2014	Cahaya Dari Timur: Beta Maluku *	Angga Dwimas Sasongko	Angga Dwimas Sasongko, Glenn Fredly	Visinema Pictures, Ancora Foundation, PT Silo, Pemerintah Kota Ambon
2014	3 Nafas Likas	Rako Prijanto	Riahna Jamin Gintings, Reza Hidayat	Oreima Films
2014	Tenggelamnya Kapal Van Der Wijck	Sunil Soraya	Ram Soraya, Sunil Soraya	Soraya Intercine Films
2014	Soekarno: Indonesia Merdeka	Hanung Bramantyo	Raam Punjabi	MVP Pictures, Mahaka Pictures, Dapur Film
2014	The Raid: Berandal	Gareth Evans	Ario Sagantoro, Nate Bolotin, Aram Tertzakian	PT. Merantau Films, XYZ Films
2014	Selamat Pagi, Malam	Lucky Kuswandi	Sammaria Simanjuntak, Sharon Simanjuntak	PT Kepompong Gendut, Sodamachine Films
2014	Sebelum Pagi Terulang Kembali	Lasja Fauzia Susatyo	M Abduh Aziz	Cangkir Kopi
2014	Comic 8	Anggy Umbara	Frederica	Falcon Pictures
2015	Guru Bangsa: Tjokroaminoto *	Garin Nugroho	Christine Hakim, Didi Petet, Dewi Umaya Rachman, Sabrang Mowo Damar Panuluh, Nayaka Untara, Ari Syarif	Pic[k]lock Production, MSH Films, Yayasan Keluarga Besar HOS Tjokroaminoto
2015	3: Alif Lam Mim	Anggy Umbara	Arie Untung	FAM Pictures, MVP Pictures
2015	Filosofi Kopi	Angga Dwimas Sasongko	Anggia Kharisma, Handoko Hendroyono	Visinema Pictures, Torabika
2015	Kapan Kawin?	Ody C Harahap	Robert Ronny	Legacy Pictures
2015	Mencari Hilal	Ismail Basbeth	Raam Punjabi, Salman Aristo, Putut Widjanarko	MVP Pictures, Studio Denny JA, Dapur Film, Argi Film, Mizan Productions
2015	Pendekar Tongkat Emas	Riri Riza	Mira Lesmana	Miles Films, KG Studio
2015	Siti	Eddie Cahyono	Ifa Isfansyah	Fourcolours Films
2015	Toba Dreams	Benni Setiawan	Rizaludin Kurniawan	Semesta Production, TB Silalahi Center
2016	Aisyah: Biarkan Kami Bersaudara *	Herwin Novianto	Hamdhani Koestoro	Film One Production
2016	A Copy of My Mind	Joko Anwar	Tia Hasibuan, Uwie Balfas	Lo-Fi Flicks, CJ Entertainment, Prodigihouse
2016	Ada Apa Dengan Cinta? 2	Riri Riza	Mira Lesmana	Miles Films, Legacy Pictures, Tanakhir Films
2016	Athirah	Riri Riza	Mira Lesmana	Miles Films
2016	My Stupid Boss	Upi	Frederica	Falcon Pictures
2016	Sunya	Hari Suhariyadi	Hari Suhariyadi	Sinema Hari Cipta
2016	Surat Dari Praha	Angga Dwimas Sasongko	Angga Dwimas Sasongko, Anggia Kharisma, Handoko Hendroyono, Rio Dewanto, Chicco Jerikho	Visinema Pictures, 13 Entertainment, Tinggikan Production
2016	Warkop DKI Reborn: Jangkrik Boss Part 1	Anggy Umbara	Frederica	Falcon Pictures
