= 2014 Indonesian Film Festival =

2014 Indonesian film awards

34th Indonesian Film Festival
- Date: 6 December 2014
- Site: Palembang Sport and Convention Center, Palembang, South Sumatra, Indonesia
- Hosted by: Steny Agustaf; Indy Barends

Highlights
- Best Picture: Lights from the East: I Am Maluku
- Most awards: Soekarno and Tabula Rasa (4)
- Most nominations: Soekarno (13)

Television coverage
- Network: Kompas TV and BeritaSatu

The 34th Indonesian Film Festival ceremony took place on 6 December 2014 at the Palembang Sport and Convention Center, Palembang, South Sumatra, Indonesia, to honor the achievement in Indonesian cinema of 2014. It was broadcast on Kompas TV and BeritaSatu and hosted by presenters Steny Agustaf and Indy Barends.

Sports drama film Lights from the East: I Am Maluku won the Best Picture and Best Actor for Chicco Jerikho, making it the first Best Picture winner to win only one other Citra Award. Drama films Soekarno and Tabula Rasa received the most awards with four. Other winners included Killers and The Jungle School with two. Actor Slamet Rahardjo received the Lifetime Achievement Award.

== Winners and nominations ==
The nominations were announced on 25 November 2014 at the Balairung Soesilo Soedarman, Jakarta. Biographical drama films dominated the nominations with Soekarno leading with thirteen, followed by 3 Nafas Likas with eleven and The Jungle School with nine.

Winners are listed first, highlighted in boldface, and indicated with a double dagger (‡).

**Best Picture**: **Lights from the East: I Am Maluku – Angga Dwimas Sasongko and Glenn Fredly**‡; 3 Nafas Likas – Reza Hidayat and Riahna Djamin Gintings; Before the Morning Repeated – M. Abduh Aziz; The Jungle School – Mira Lesmana; Soekarno – Raam Punjabi	**Best Director**: **Adriyanto Dewo – Tabula Rasa**‡; Hanung Bramantyo – Soekarno; Lucky Kuswandi – In the Absence of the Sun; Rako Prijanto – 3 Nafas Likas; Riri Riza – The Jungle School
**Best Actor**: **Chicco Jerikho – Lights from the East: I Am Maluku as Sani Tawainella**‡; Abimana Aryasatya – Haji Backpacker as Mada; Ario Bayu – Soekarno as Sukarno; Herjunot Ali – The Sinking of van der Wijck as Zainuddin; Vino G. Bastian – 3 Nafas Likas as Djamin Ginting	**Best Actress**: **Dewi Irawan – Tabula Rasa as Mak**‡; Atiqah Hasiholan – 3 Nafas Likas as Likas Tarigan; Maudy Koesnaedi – Soekarno as Inggit Garnasih; Prisia Nasution – The Jungle School as Butet Manurung; Revalina S. Temat – Hijrah Cinta as Pipik Dian Irawati
**Best Supporting Actor**: **Yayu Unru – Tabula Rasa as Parmanto**‡; Lukman Sardi – Soekarno as Mohammad Hatta; Nino Fernandez – 99 Cahaya di Langit Eropa as Stefan; Reza Rahadian – The Sinking of van der Wijck as Azis; Ringgo Agus Rahman – Before the Morning Repeated as Jaka	**Best Supporting Actress**: **Tika Bravani – Soekarno as Fatmawati**‡; Jajang C. Noer – 3 Nafas Likas as Likas' mother; Jajang C. Noer – Lights from the East: I Am Maluku as Alfin Tuasalamony's mother; Laura Basuki – Haji Backpacker as Soon-chu; Nirina Zubir – Silent Hero(es) as Aleyna Wu
**Best Original Screenplay**: **Tabula Rasa – Tumpal Tampubolon**‡; Before the Morning Repeated – Sinar Ayu Maissy; In the Absence of the Sun – Lucky Kuswandi and Ucu Agustin; Let's Run – Ninit Yunita; Negeri Tanpa Telinga – Indra Tranggono and Lola Amaria	**Best Adapted Screenplay**: **The Jungle School – Riri Riza; based on the book by Butet Manurung**‡; 3 Nafas Likas – Titien Wattimena; based on the book Perempuan Tegar dari Sibolangit by Hilda Unu-Senduk; Lights from the East: I Am Maluku – Angga Dwimas Sasongko, M. Irfan Ramli, and Swastika Nohara; based on the life of Sani Tawainella; The Sinking of van der Wijck – Imam Tantowi, Donny Dhirgantoro, Riheam Junianti, and Sunil Soraya; based on the novel by Hamka; Soekarno – Hanung Bramantyo and Ben Sihombing; based on the life of Sukarno
**Best Documentary Feature**: **Dolanan Kehidupan – Afina Fahtu M. and Yopa Arfi**‡; Masked Monkey (The Evolution of Darwin Theory) – Ismail Fahmi Lubish; Ngulon – Tony Trimarsanto; Quran Sang Paus – Ari Aristo; Penderes dan Pengidep – Achmad Ulfi	**Best Live Action Short Film**: **Onomastika – Loeloe Hendra**‡; Maryam – Sidi Saleh; Polah – Arie Surastio; Sepatu Baru – Aditya Ahmad; Sowan – Bobby Prasetyo
**Best Animated Short Film**: **Asia Raya – Anka Atmawijaya Adinegara**‡; Adit Sopo Jarwo (Episode: "Motor Baru") – Dana Riza & Indrajaya; Anak Bangsa – M. Panji Shofiullah; Love Paper – Ipoenk; Pret! – Virman Wijasmara
**Best Cinematography**: **Before the Morning Repeated – Nur Hidayat**‡; 3 Nafas Likas – Hani Pradigya; Lights from the East: I Am Maluku – Robie Taswin; Soekarno – Faozan Rizal; Sepatu Dahlan – Rendra Yusworo	**Best Film Editing**: **Soekarno – Cesa David Luckmansyah and Wawan I. Wibowo**‡; 99 Cahaya di Langit Eropa – Ryan Purwoko; Before the Morning Repeated – Sastha Sunu; The Jungle School – Waluyo Ichwandiardono; Lights from the East: I Am Maluku – Yoga Krispratama
**Best Original Score**: **Killers – Fajar Yuskemal and Aria Prayogi**‡; The Jungle School – Aksan Sjuman; In the Absence of the Sun – Ivan Gojaya; Soekarno – Tya Soebiakto; Tabula Rasa – Lie Indra Perkasa	**Best Sound**: **Killers – Fajar Yuskemal and Aria Prayogi**‡; The Jungle School – Yusuf A. Patawari and Satrio Budiono; Lights from the East: I Am Maluku – Satrio Budiono; Sepatu Dahlan – Khikmawan Santosa; Soekarno – Sutrisno and Satrio Budiono
**Best Visual Effects**: **The Sinking of van der Wijck – Eltra Studio and Adam Howarth**‡; 3 Nafas Likas – Raiyan Laksmana; Comic 8 – Totok Santoso and Hillboy; Guardian – Eric Kawilarang; Killers – Andi Novanto	**Best Art Direction**: **Soekarno – Allan Sebastian**‡; 3 Nafas Likas – Frans X. R. Paat; The Jungle School – Eros Eflin; Lights from the East: I Am Maluku – Yusuf Kaisuki; Tabula Rasa – Iqbal Marjono
**Best Costume Design**: **Soekarno – Retno Ratih Damayanti**‡; 3 Nafas Likas – Gemailla Gea Geriantiana; 99 Cahaya di Langit Eropa – Retno Ratih Damayanti; The Sinking of van der Wijck – Samuel Wattimena; Street Society – Angelia Florensia	**Special Award for Best Child Performer**: **Nengkabau Sunting – The Jungle School as Nang Kabau**‡; **Tissa Biani – 3 Nafas Likas as young Likas**‡
**Lifetime Achievement Award**: **Slamet Rahardjo**‡

=== Films with multiple nominations and awards ===
Films that received multiple nominations
Nominations	Film
13	Soekarno
11	3 Nafas Likas
9	The Jungle School
8	Lights from the East: I Am Maluku
6	Tabula Rasa
5	Before the Morning Repeated
5	The Sinking of van der Wijck
3	99 Cahaya di Langit Eropa
3	In the Absence of the Sun
3	Killers
2	Haji Backpacker

Films that received multiple awards
Awards	Film
4	Soekarno
4	Tabula Rasa
2	The Jungle School
2	Killers
2	Lights from the East: I Am Maluku
