= Maya Award for Best Actor in a Supporting Role =

Annual Indonesian film award

- Awarded for: Best Actor in a Supporting Role of the Year
- Country: Indonesia
- First award: 2012
- Currently held by: Adi Kurdi; Catatan Dodol Calon Dokter (2016)
- Website: pialamaya.com

The Maya Award for Best Actor in a Supporting Role is one of the Maya Awards presented annually since the awards debuted in 2012, that is initiated by FILM_Indonesia Twitter account.

The nominations and winners of the awards are selected by a panel of judges consisting of Indonesian film critics and filmmakers, including directors, actors, and actresses.

== Winners and nominees ==
indicates the winner

=== 2010s ===
Year	Actor	Film
2012	Rio Dewanto *	Arisan! 2
2012	Butet Kertaradjasa	Soegija
2012	Fuad Idris	Tanah Surga... Katanya
2012	Ramon Y. Tungka	Cinta di Saku Celana
2012	Ray Sahetapy	The Raid: Redemption
2013	Alex Komang *	9 Summers 10 Autumns
2013	Agus Kuncoro	Gending Sriwijaya
2013	Didi Petet	Madre
2013	Mathias Muchus	Hari Ini Pasti Menang
2013	Landung Simatupang	Rumah dan Musim Hujan
2014	Arifin Putra *	The Raid: Berandal
2014	Reza Rahadian	Tenggelamnya Kapal Van Der Wijck
2014	Oka Antara	The Raid: Berandal
2014	Lukman Sardi	Soekarno: Indonesia Merdeka
2014	Yayu Unru	Tabula Rasa
2015	Donny Damara *	2014
2015	Adi Kurdi	Kapan Kawin?
2015	Mathias Muchus	Toba Dreams
2015	Oka Antara	Mencari Hilal
2015	Tio Pakusadewo	Bulan Diatas Kuburan
2016	Adi Kurdi *	Catatan Dodol Calon Dokter
2016	Chew Kinwah	My Stupid Boss
2016	Christoffer Nelwan	Athirah
2016	Arie Kriting	Aisyah: Biarkan Kami Bersaudara
2016	Deva Mahenra	Sabtu Bersama Bapak

== Multiple wins and nominations ==
The following individuals have received Best Actor in a Supporting Role awards:

Wins	Actor
1	Donny Damara
1	Adi Kurdi
1	Rio Dewanto
1	Arifin Putra
1	Alex Komang

The following individuals have received multiple Best Actor in a Supporting Role nominations:

Nominations	Actor
2	Mathias Muchus
2	Adi Kurdi
2	Oka Antara
