= Maya Award for Best Actress in a Leading Role =

Annual Indonesian film award

- Awarded for: Best Actress in a Leading Role of the Year
- Country: Indonesia
- First award: 2012
- Currently held by: Cut Mini; Athirah (2016)
- Website: pialamaya.com

The Maya Award for Best Actress in a Leading Role is one of the Maya Awards presented annually since the awards debuted in 2012, that is initiated by FILM_Indonesia Twitter account.

The nominations and winners of the awards are selected by a panel of judges consisting of Indonesian film critics and filmmakers, including directors, actors, and actresses.

== Winners and nominees ==
indicates the winner

=== 2010s ===
Year	Actress	Film
2012	Jajang C. Noer *	Mata Tertutup
2012	Acha Septriasa	Test Pack
2012	Atiqah Hasiholan	Hello Goodbye
2012	Nani Widjaja	Ummi Aminah
2012	Raihaanun	Lovely Man
2013	Julia Perez *	Gending Sriwijaya
2013	Adinia Wirasti	Laura & Marsha
2013	Prisia Nasution	Sokola Rimba
2013	Ratu Felisha	Something in the Way
2013	Ririn Ekawati	Kisah 3 Titik
2014	Dewi Irawan *	Tabula Rasa
2014	Atiqah Hasiholan	3 Nafas Likas
2014	Maudy Koesnaedi	Soekarno: Indonesia Merdeka
2014	Chelsea Islan	Street Society
2014	Revalina S Temat	Hijrah Cinta
2015	Marsha Timothy *	Nada Untuk Asa
2015	Adinia Wirasti	Kapan Kawin?
2015	Dian Sastrowardoyo	7/24
2015	Laudya Cynthia Bella	Surga Yang Tak Dirindukan
2015	Tutie Kirana	About a Woman
2016	Cut Mini *	Athirah
2016	Bunga Citra Lestari	My Stupid Boss
2016	Christine Hakim	Ibu Maafkan Aku
2016	Laudya Cynthia Bella	Aisyah: Biarkan Kami Bersaudara
2016	Sha Ine Febriyanti	Nay

== Multiple wins and nominations ==
The following individuals have received Best Actress in a Leading Role awards:

Wins	Actress
1	Jajang C. Noer
1	Marsha Timothy
1	Cut Mini
1	Julia Perez
1	Dewi Irawan

The following individuals have received multiple Best Actress in a Leading Role nominations:

Nominations	Actress
3	Atiqah Hasiholan
3	Laudya Cynthia Bella
3	Adinia Wirasti
