= 2014 Maya Awards =

Annual Indonesian film awards ceremony

3rd Annual Maya Awards
- Date: December 20, 2014
- Location: Museum Nasional, Central Jakarta
- Country: Indonesia
- Most awards: Cahaya Dari Timur: Beta Maluku (8)
- Most nominations: 3 Nafas Likas (16)

The 3rd Annual Maya Awards (Indonesian: Piala Maya 2014) is an award ceremony honoring the best in Indonesian films of 2014. The ceremony was held in Museum Nasional, Central Jakarta, on December 20, 2014.

== Awards ==
The number of awards being given this year increase from the previous year to 32 competitive categories with 4 special awards. The following new categories were not present previously:

- Best Short Documentary (previously Best Documentary)
- Best Long Documentary (previously Best Documentary)
- Best Animated Film (previously Best Short Animated Film)

== Winners and nominees ==
Winners are listed first and signified in bold letters.

=== Technical ===
Best Feature Film	Best Director
Cahaya Dari Timur: Beta Maluku; 3 Nafas Likas; Tenggelamnya Kapal Van Der Wijck; Soekarno; The Raid: Berandal; Selamat Pagi, Malam; Sebelum Pagi Terulang Kembali; Comic 8	Angga Dwimas Sasongko – Cahaya Dari Timur: Beta Maluku; Lucky Kuswandi – Selamat Pagi, Malam; Hanung Bramantyo – Soekarno; Lasja Fauzia Susatyo – Sebelum Pagi Terulang Kembali; Rako Prijanto – 3 Nafas Likas
Best Adapted Screenplay	Best Original Screenplay
Soekarno – Ben Sihombing; 3 Nafas Likas – Titien Wattimena; Tenggelamnya Kapal Van Der Wijck – Dhonny Dhirgantoro, Sunil Soraya, Riheam Junianti and Imam Tantowi	Cahaya Dari Timur: Beta Maluku – Swastika Nohara, Angga Dwimas Sasongko and M Irfan Ramli; Mari Lari – Ninit Yunita; The Sun, The Moon, and The Hurricane – Andri Cung; Selamat Pagi, Malam – Lucky Kuswandi; Tabula Rasa – Tumpal Tampubolon
Best Special Effects	Best Makeup & Hairstyling
The Raid: Berandal – (No specific name); Tak Kemal Maka Tak Sayang – (No specific name); 3 Nafas Likas – Raiyan Laksamana; Comic 8 – Totok Santoso and Hillboy; Tenggelamnya Kapal Van Der Wijck – Eltra Studio and Adam Howarth	Killers – Kumalasari Tanara; The Raid: Berandal – Kumalasari Tanara; 3 Nafas Likas – Gunawan Sarigih and Chaery Eka Wirawan; Tenggelamnya Kapal Van Der Wijck – (No specific name); Soekarno – (No specific name)
Best Costume Design	Best Sound Design
3 Nafas Likas – Gemaillia Ghea Geretiana; Tenggelamnya Kapal Van Der Wijck – Samuel Wattimena; Street Society – Angelia Florensia; Soekarno – Retno R. Damayanti; Haji Backpacker – Quartini Sari and Judith Tedjamulja	Killers – Aria Prayogi and Fajar Yuskemal; Soekarno – Satrio Budiono and Sutrisno; The Raid: Berandal – Brandon Proctor and M. Ichsan Rachmaditta; Comic 8 – Madun Azka and Khikmawan Santosa; 3 Nafas Likas – Khikmawan Santosa and M. Ikhsan Sungkar
Best Film Score	Best Art Direction
Cahaya Dari Timur: Beta Maluku – Nikita Dompas; Soekarno – Tya Subiakto; Tabula Rasa – Lie Indra Perkasa; The Raid: Berandal – Aria Prayogi, Fajar Yuksemal and Joseph Trapanese; Killers – Fajar Yuksemal	3 Nafas Likas – Frans XR Paat; Tenggelamnya Kapal Van Der Wijck – (No specific name); Soekarno – Allan Sebastian; Hijrah Cinta – Allan Sebastian; Tabula Rasa – Iqbal Marjono
Best Editing	Best Cinematography
The Raid: Berandal – Gareth Evans and Andi Novianto; Cahaya Dari Timur: Beta Maluku – Yogi Krispratama; Soekarno – Cesa David Lukmansyah; Selamat Pagi, Malam – Lucky Kuswandi; Comic 8 – Bounty Umbara	The Raid: Berandal – Matt Flanery and Dimas I Subono; Tenggelamnya Kapal Van Der Wijck – Yudi Datau; Soekarno – Faozan Rizal; Killers – Gunnar Nimpuno; 3 Nafas Likas – Hani Pradigya
Best Poster Design	Best Theme Song
Sebelum Pagi Terulang Kembali – JJ Adibrata; 3 Nafas Likas – John Hollywood; Rocket Rain – Uji Handoko; Tabula Rasa – Alvin Hariz; Bajaj Bajuri The Movie – Jonathan Oh	"Tinggikan" performed by Glenn Fredly – Cahaya Dari Timur: Beta Maluku; "Sumpah & Cinta Matiku" performed by Nidji – Tenggelamnya Kapal Van Der Wijck; "Lekas" composed and performed by Tulus – 3 Nafas Likas; "Hati Garuda" performed by Letto – Garuda 19; "Hijrah Cinta" performed by Rossa – Hijrah Cinta

=== Performers ===
Best Actor in a Leading Role	Best Actress in a Leading Role
Chicco Jerikho – Cahaya Dari Timur: Beta Maluku; Vino G. Bastian – 3 Nafas Likas; Ario Bayu – Soekarno; Alfie Affandy – Hijrah Cinta; Herjunot Ali – Tenggelamnya Kapal Van Der Wijck	Dewi Irawan – Tabula Rasa; Atiqah Hasiholan – 3 Nafas Likas; Maudy Koesnaedi – Soekarno; Chelsea Islan – Street Society; Revalina S Temat – Hijrah Cinta
Best Actor in a Supporting Role	Best Actress in a Supporting role
Arifin Putra – The Raid: Berandal; Reza Rahadian – Tenggelamnya Kapal Van Der Wijck; Oka Antara – The Raid: Berandal; Yayu Unru – Tabula Rasa; Lukman Sardi – Soekarno	Meriam Bellina – Slank Nggak Ada Matinya; Jajang C. Noer – 3 Nafas Likas; Tika Bravani – Soekarno; Laura Basuki – Haji Backpacker; Karina Nadila – Aku, Kau & KUA
Best New Actor	Best New Actress
Tanta Ginting – Soekarno; Randy Nidji – Tenggelamnya Kapal Van Der Wijck; Deva Mahenra – Slank Nggak Ada Matinya; Jimmy Kabogau – Tabula Rasa; William Tjokro – The Sun, The Moon, and The Hurricane	Marissa Anita – Selamat Pagi Malam; Dayu Wijanto – Selamat Pagi Malam; Safira Uum – Cahaya Dari Timur: Beta Maluku; Rain Chudori – Rocket Rain; Michelle Ziudith – Remember When
Best Actor in an Omnibus	Best Actress in an Omnibus
Tora Sudiro in Babe Oh Babe segment – Princess, Bajak Laut & Alien; Rio Dewanto in Firasat segment – Aku Cinta Kamu; Raza Super Seven in Babe Oh Babe segment – Princess, Bajak Laut & Alien	Acha Septriasa in Firasat segment – Aku Cinta Kamu; Luna Maya in Babe Oh Babe segment – Princess, Bajak Laut & Alien; Eriska Reinisa in Cinta Itu Adalah... segment – Aku Cinta Kamu
Best Young Performer	Arifin C Noer Award for Non-Effectively Brief Appearance
Bebeto Lautally – Cahaya Dari Timur: Beta Maluku; Fatih Unru – Seputih Cinta Melati; Tissa Biani – 3 Nafas Likas; Osa Aji Santoso – Sepatu Dahlan; Rizky Black – Sayap Kecil Garuda	Norman Akyuwen – Cahaya Dari Timur: Beta Maluku; Roy Marten – Sebelum Pagi Terulang Kembali; Henky Solaiman – Malam Minggu Miko The Movie; Laudya Cynthia Bella – Haji Backpacker; Julie Estelle – The Raid: Berandal; Lukman Sardi – Negeri Tanpa Telinga

=== Competition ===
Best Short Film	Best Regional Film
Sepatu Baru – Aditya Ahmad; Maryam – Sidih Saleh; Onomastika – Loeloe Hendra; Seserahan – Jason Iskandar; Gazebo – Senoaji Julius; Horison – Samuel Ruby; Cita – Andi Burhamzah; Pingitan – Orizon Astonia	Bombe – Syahrir Arsyad Dini (Makassar); Hening – Achmad Fakrudin (Solo); Salisiah Adaik – Ferdinand Almy (Padang Panjang)
Best Short Documentary Film	Best Long Documentary Film
Penderes dan Pengidep – Achmad Ulfi; Komedi Coklat – Chairun Nissa; Split Mind – Andri Sofyansyah; The Flaneurs #3 – Aryo Danusuri; Akar – Amelia Hapsari	Jalanan – Daniel Ziv); Biji Kopi Indonesia – Budi Kurniawan; Ngulon – Tonny Trimarsanto
Best Animated Film	Iqbal Rais Award (Special Awards for Young Director of Short Film)
Altitude Alto – Aditya Prabaswara; Aditya & Putri Matahari – Gangsar Waskito; Asia Raya – Anka Atmawijaya; Love Paper – Bambang P.M; Joni Boni Duff – Eko Purnomo; Rocking Chair – Donny Langgeng and Aji; The Gift – Marshellina Monica; Kitchen Knight – Donny Irianto	Indie Bung! – Yuleo Rizki; Anna & Ballerina – Naya Anindita; Thieves – Rukiki Mariana; Iris – Dira Nararyya; Simanggale – Donny Arlen
Best Segment in an Omnibus	Best Film Review
"Firasat", directed by Acha Septriasa – Aku Cinta Kamu; "Babe Oh Babe", directed by Alfani Wiryawan – Princess, Bajak Laut & Alien; "Kamu Bully Aku B-Boy", directed by Rizal Mantovani – Princess, Bajak Laut & Alien	Haris Fadli, for "Memberi Hidup Luar Biasa Untuk Sosok Yang Biasa" – 3 Nafas Likas; Elbert Reyner, for "Ketika Hati dan Budaya Bercampur Dalam Rasa" – Tabula Rasa; Skolastika Lupitawina, for "Nisbinya Gemerlap Ibukota" – Selamat Pagi, Malam; Diaksa Adhistra, for "Inside the Mind of a Killer(s)" – Killers; M Qodarul Fittron, for "Makanan Sederhana Kaya Rasa" – Tabula Rasa

=== Special awards ===
Equator Film Expo (EFX) Award for International Achievement	Best DVD Collection
The Raid: Berandal	The Raid: Berandal (NAV)
Best Top Chart	Honours Award
400 Words – Ismail Basbeth	Ade Irawan

== Multiple wins and nominations ==
The following films received multiple awards:

Film	Wins
Cahaya Dari Timur: Beta Maluku	8
The Raid: Berandal	6
3 Nafas Likas	3
Aku Cinta Kamu; Killers; Soekarno	2

The following films receive multiple nominations:

Film	Nominations
3 Nafas Likas	16
Soekarno	15
Tenggelamnya Kapal Van Der Wijck	11
Cahaya Dari Timur: Beta Maluku; The Raid: Berandal	10
Tabula Rasa	9
Selamat Pagi, Malam	6
Killers; Princess, Bajak Laut & Alien	5
Aku Cinta Kamu; Comic 8 Hijrah Cinta; Sebelum Pagi Terulang Kembali	4
Haji Backpacker	3
Rocket Rain; Slank Nggak Ada Matinya; Street Society; The Sun, The Moon, and The Hurricane	2
