= Tabula Rasa (film) =

2014 drama film

- Theatrical release poster
- Directed by: Adriyanto Dewo
- Written by: Tumpal Tampubolon
- Produced by: Sheila Timothy
- Starring: Jimmy Kobogau; Dewi Irawan; Yayu Unru; Ozzol Ramdan
- Cinematography: Amalia T. S.
- Edited by: Dinda Amanda
- Music by: Lie Indra Perkasa
- Production company: Lifelike Pictures
- Release date: 24 September 2014
- Running time: 107 minutes
- Country: Indonesia
- Languages: Indonesian; Minangkabau

Tabula Rasa is a 2014 drama film directed by Adriyanto Dewo in his directorial debut from a screenplay written by Tumpal Tampubolon. The film stars Jimmy Kobogau, Dewi Irawan, Yayu Unru, and Ozzol Ramdan.

The film was theatrically released in Indonesia on 24 September 2014. It received four Citra Awards at the 2014 Indonesian Film Festival, including Best Director for Dewo.

== Premise ==
After failing to become a professional football player, a young Papuan man becomes homeless in Jakarta. He is later taken in by the owner of a struggling nasi padang stall.

== Cast ==
- Jimmy Kobogau as Hans
- Dewi Irawan as Mak
- Yayu Unru as Parmanto
- Ozzol Ramdan as Natsir

== Production ==
The film's producer Sheila Timothy revealed that the idea of Tabula Rasa was conceived four years earlier, after being inspired by her mother who continued cooking even after her father's death. Early in the development, Timothy revealed plans to juxtapose Minangkabau culture with African culture. However, this idea was shelved due to logistical issues. Screenwriter Tumpal Tampubolon conducted extensive research in Bukittinggi, West Sumatra, and Serui, Papua. The research involved chef Adzan Tri Budiman and writer Reno Andam Suri as culinary advisors and choreographer Tom Ibnur as a dialect coach and cultural advisor.

Principal photography began in January 2014 in Jakarta, Bogor, and Serui. In Serui, more than 200 local residents participated as extras during the filming.

== Release ==
Tabula Rasa was released theatrically in Indonesia on 25 September 2014. The film was screened at the 2018 Sofia International Film Festival on 23 March 2018, as the first Indonesian film to screen at the festival.

== Accolades ==
Award / Film Festival	Date of ceremony	Category	Recipient(s)	Result	Ref.
Indonesian Film Festival	6 December 2014	Best Director	Adriyanto Dewo	Won	
Indonesian Film Festival	6 December 2014	Best Actress	Dewi Irawan	Won	
Indonesian Film Festival	6 December 2014	Best Supporting Actor	Yayu Unru	Won	
Indonesian Film Festival	6 December 2014	Best Original Screenplay	Tumpal Tampubolon	Won	
Indonesian Film Festival	6 December 2014	Best Art Direction	Iqbal Marjono	Nominated	
Indonesian Film Festival	6 December 2014	Best Original Score	Lie Indra Perkasa	Nominated	
Maya Awards	20 December 2014	Best Actress in a Leading Role	Dewi Irawan	Won	
Maya Awards	20 December 2014	Best Actor in a Supporting Role	Yayu Unru	Nominated	
Maya Awards	20 December 2014	Best Breakthrough Actor	Jimmy Kobogau	Nominated	
Maya Awards	20 December 2014	Best Original Screenplay	Tumpal Tampubolon	Nominated	
Maya Awards	20 December 2014	Best Score	Lie Indra Perkasa	Nominated	
Maya Awards	20 December 2014	Best Art Direction	Iqbal Marjono	Nominated	
Maya Awards	20 December 2014	Best Poster Design	Alvin Hariz	Nominated	
