= Oka Antara =

Indonesian actor

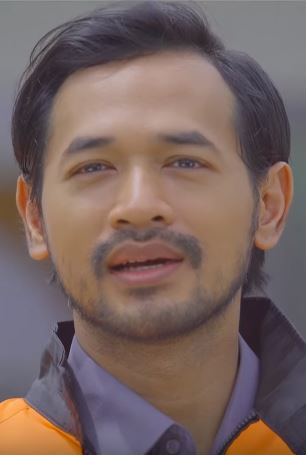
- Oka Antara in 2016
- Born: Nyoman Oka Wisnupada Antara; July 8, 1981 (age 44); Jakarta, Indonesia
- Occupations: Celebrity, Model, Rapper, Presenter, Songwriter
- Years active: 2000 - present
- Notable work: Sang Penari; V/H/S/2; Killers; The Raid 2 Mencari Hilal; Foxtrot Six; Aruna & Her Palate
- Partner: Rara Wiritanaya (m. 2008)
- Children: 3
- Musical career
- Genres: Hip Hop

Oka Antara (born Nyoman Oka Wisnupada Antara; 8 July 1981) is an Indonesian actor of Balinese descent. He is best known for starring in the films The Dancer (2011), V/H/S/2 (2013), Killers (2014), and The Raid 2 (2014).

== Life and career ==
Oka Antara was born in Jakarta on 8 July 1981. He is of Balinese descent. Oka Antara made his film debut in 2005 with Gue Kapok Jatuh Cinta (I Give Up on Falling in Love). One of the film's directors, Thomas Nawilis, asked him to write the film's soundtrack. Oka Antara did so, and sang a duet with Sabria Kono entitled "So Special" for the film. After the film's success, Antara continued acting. In 2006, he played in Dunia Mereka (Their World), and the following year he was in Hantu (Ghost).

In 2008, he played Syaiful in Ayat-Ayat Cinta (Verses of Love), a film by Hanung Bramantyo; the part earned him a Citra Award nomination at the Indonesian Film Festival. The following year he appeared in another Bramantyo film, Perempuan Berkalung Sorban (Woman with a Turban); he considered the script very interesting, citing it as his reason for joining the cast. This role earned him an award for Best Supporting Actor at the 2009 Bandung Film Festival. That same year, he played a Presidential Protection Squad member in Queen Bee, directed by Fajar Nugroho. For the role, he studied the squad's role from books and took training from a real-life member.

Oka Antara earned another Best Actor award, this time at the Indonesian Movie Awards, for his role in 2010's Hari Untuk Amanda (Days for Amanda), which garnered him a nomination for the Citra Award for Best Leading Actor. Afterward, the newspaper Kompas reported that he was taking a break from acting to write a film scenario.

In 2011, Oka Antara was approached by producer Shanty Harmayn for the leading role of Rasus in Ifa Isfansyah's film Sang Penari (The Dancer). In preparing for the role as a malnourished young man, Oka Antara cut back on his food intake; he later splurged when he had to play Rasus as a soldier. His acting in the role led to a Citra Award nomination for Best Actor, although he lost to Emir Mahira of Rumah Tanpa Jendela (House Without Windows).

== Personal life ==
On 7 July 2008, Oka Antara married Rara Wiritanaya, a TV presenter from Bali. They held a private wedding ceremony at home in Karangasem, Bali. The couple have 3 children.

He is a practicing Balinese Hindu and hailed from a tolerant but conservative Balinese Hindu family. Despite his religion and family background, he often gets roles in Islamic films and soap operas. Due to this, there was an accidental incident involving him where an official mistakenly recorded his religion as Islam instead of Hindu, resulting in a religious conversion rumor and shocking his family. The rumor had been dispelled after his clarification.

He is a silat and kickboxing practitioner. His skills on these sports have landed him lead roles in Indonesian action movies.

== Discography ==
=== Studio album ===
- One Way (2004)

== Filmography ==
=== Film ===
Year	Title	Role	Director(s)	Notes	Refs.
2006	Gue Kapok Jatuh Cinta (I Give Up on Falling in Love)	David Harris	Awi Suryadi, Thomas Nawilis		
2006	Dunia Mereka (Their World)	Rio	Lasja Fauzia Susatyo		
2007	Hantu (Ghost)	Galih	Adrianto Sinaga		
2008	Best Friend?	Molly's mother boyfriend	Fajar BGT		
2008	The Shaman	Doctor Rian	Raditya Sidharta		
2008	Ayat-Ayat Cinta (Verses of Love)	Saiful	Hanung Bramantyo		
2008	Doa yang Mengancam (A Threatening Prayer)	Bodyguard	Hanung Bramantyo		
2008	Kick 'n Love	Budi	Dennis Adhiswara, Heru Effendi		
2009	Perempuan Berkalung Sorban (Woman with a Turban)	Khudori	Hanung Bramantyo		
2009	Queen Bee	Secret Service	Fajar Nugros		
2010	Hari Untuk Amanda (Days for Amanda)	Hari Ananda	Angga Dwimas Sasongko		
2011	Sang Penari (The Dancer)	Rasus	Ifa Isfansyah		
2013	V/H/S/2	Malik	Timo Tjahjanto, Gareth Evans	Segment "Safe Heaven"	
2014	Killers	Bayu Aditya	Kimo Stamboel, Timo Tjahjanto		
2014	The Raid 2	Eka	Gareth Evans		
2015	The Crescent Moon	Heli	Ismail Basbeth		
2016	Petualangan Singa Pemberani Atlantos (The Adventure of the Brave Lion of Atlantos)	General Khan	Lee Croudy	Voice over	
2016	Departures	Ezra Mahendra	Jorik Dozy	Short film	
2017	Moammar Emka's Jakarta Undercover	Pras	Fajar Nugros		
2018	Aruna & Her Palate	Farish	Edwin		
2019	Foxtrot Six	Angga/LT	Randy Korompis		
2019	Glorious Days	Jaka (Adult)	Riri Riza		
2020	One Day We'll Talk About Today	Young Narendra	Angga Dwimas Sasongko		
2022	The Red Point of Marriage	Gilang Priambodo	Sabrina Rochelle Kalangie		

=== Television ===
Year	Title	Role	Network	Notes	Ref.
2007	Dewa Asmara (Cupid)	Pinot	SCTV		
2007	Cinta Bunga (Bunga's Love)	Arman	SCTV		
2008	Cinta Fitri Season 2 (Fitri's Love Season 2)	—N/a	RCTI		
2008	Yasmin	Donny	RCTI		
2009	Manohara	Rico	RCTI		
2013	Kami Bukan Malaikat (We are not Angels)	Fadil	MNCTV		
2013	Putri Nomer Satu (Princess Number One)	Bara	RCTI		
2014	Catatan Hati Seorang Istri (A Wife's Heart Note)	Rudolft	RCTI		
2014	Keluarga Garuda di Dadaku (Family of Garuda in My Chest)	Johan	RCTI		
2015	OK-JEK	Iqbal	NET TV		
2018 - 2020	Brata	Brata	Hooq		
2021 - 2022	Ikatan Cinta	Irvan Pratama Adicipta	RCTI		

=== Music video appearances ===
Year	Title	Artist	Notes	Ref.
2015	"Jatuh Hati" ("Falling in Love")	Raisa		
2015	"Tak Seimbang" (featuring Iwan Fals) ("Unbalanced")	Geisha		

== Awards and nominations ==
Year	Organisation	Award	Recipients	Result
2008	Indonesian Film Festival	Citra Award for Best Supporting Actor	The Verses of Love	Nominated
2009	Bandung Film Festival	Best Supporting Actor	Woman with a Turban	Won
2010	Indonesian Movie Awards	Best Supporting Actor	Queen Bee	Nominated
2010	Indonesian Movie Awards	Best Actor	Hari untuk Amanda	Nominated
2010	Indonesian Movie Awards	Best Chemistry (with Fanny Fabriana)	Hari untuk Amanda	Nominated
2010	Indonesian Movie Awards	Favorite Actor	Hari untuk Amanda	Won
2010	Indonesian Movie Awards	Favorite Chemistry (with Fanny Fabriana)	Hari untuk Amanda	Nominated
2012	Indonesian Movie Awards	Best Actor	Sang Penari	Nominated
2012	Indonesian Movie Awards	Best Chemistry (with Prisia Nasution)	Sang Penari	Nominated
2012	Indonesian Movie Awards	Favorite Actor	Sang Penari	Nominated
2014	Indonesian Movie Awards	Best Chemistry (with Kazuki Kitamura)	Killers	Nominated
2015	Indonesian Film Festival	Citra Award for Best Supporting Actor	Mencari Hilal	Nominated
2015	Maya Awards	Best Actor in a Supporting Role	Mencari Hilal	Nominated
2016	Bandung Film Festival	Best Television Series Actor	OK-JEK	Nominated
2016	Indonesian Movie Awards	Best Supporting Actor	Mencari Hilal	Nominated
2016	Indonesian Movie Awards	Best Chemistry (with Deddy Sutomo)	Mencari Hilal	Won
2016	Indonesian Movie Awards	Favorite Supporting Actor	Mencari Hilal	Nominated
2016	Dahsyatnya Awards	Outstanding Role in VideoClip	"Jatuh Hati"	Won
2018	Indonesian Film Festival	Citra Award for Best Leading Actor	Aruna dan Lidahnya	Nominated
