= The Raid 2 =

2014 Indonesian action crime film

- US theatrical release poster
- Indonesian: The Raid 2: Berandal
- Directed by: Gareth Evans
- Written by: Gareth Evans
- Produced by: Ario Sagantoro; Nate Bolotin; Aram Tertzakian
- Starring: Iko Uwais; Arifin Putra; Oka Antara; Tio Pakusadewo; Alex Abbad; Julie Estelle; Ryuhei Matsuda; Kenichi Endō; Kazuki Kitamura
- Cinematography: Matt Flannery; Dimas Imam Subhono
- Edited by: Gareth Evans
- Music by: Joseph Trapanese; Aria Prayogi; Fajar Yuskemal
- Production companies: Stage 6 Films; XYZ Films; PT. Merantau Films
- Distributed by: Sony Pictures Classics (North America)
- Release dates: 21 January 2014 (Sundance); 28 March 2014 (United States)
- Running time: 150 minutes
- Country: Indonesia
- Languages: Indonesian; Japanese
- Budget: $4.5 million
- Box office: $6.6 million

The Raid 2 (Indonesian: The Raid 2: Berandal, lit. 'thug'; also known as The Raid: Retaliation) is a 2014 Indonesian action thriller film written, edited and directed by Welsh filmmaker Gareth Evans. Serving as the sequel to The Raid (2011), Iko Uwais reprises his role as the tactical squad member Rama, with Arifin Putra, Oka Antara, Tio Pakusadewo, Alex Abbad, Julie Estelle, Ryuhei Matsuda, Kenichi Endō and Kazuki Kitamura joining in new roles. In the film, Rama is sent undercover to expose the corrupt police officials colluding with the crime families of Jakarta's criminal underworld.

Like Evans' previous films Merantau and The Raid, the fight scenes showcase Indonesian fighting style of pencak silat. The film was released in the United States and Canada by Sony Pictures Classics on 28 March 2014, where it received positive reviews from critics, who praised its direction, cinematography, visuals, soundtrack and action sequences, though some criticized its graphic violence.

== Plot ==
Hours after the events of the first film, police officer Rama brings his injured colleague Bowo and corrupt officer Wahyu to Lieutenant Bunawar, who is heading a secret unit investigating police corruption. Bunawar sends Bowo away for medical treatment and kills Wahyu. He then attempts to recruit Rama to help expose the extent of corrupt police commissioner Reza's operation. Initially refusing, Rama takes up the offer upon learning that his brother and mob boss Andi has been executed by rising crime lord Bejo, and that his own wife and son are now in danger.

Rama is tasked with infiltrating the Bangun family, a major crime syndicate that controls Jakarta alongside a powerful Japanese yakuza clan led by Hideaki Gotō. Placed in the same prison as Bangun's hot-tempered son, Uco, Rama gains his favor after saving his life during a prison riot. Once released, Rama is introduced to Bangun and begins working for the family. Uco later drunkenly expresses frustration at feeling sidelined within his father's organization. Rama uses the opportunity to plant a bug in Uco's wallet, and learns that Uco is secretly plotting with Bejo to start a war with the Gotō family.

To fabricate a pretext for war, Bejo's hitmen kill Prakoso, Bangun's loyal enforcer. Pinning the attack on Gotō, Uco asks Bangun to retaliate, but Bangun refuses. In a meeting between Bangun and Gotō, Uco lashes out in anger, embarrassing Bangun, who concedes territory to maintain the peace. Later in his office, Bangun beats Uco for insubordination. When Bejo storms the office with his henchmen, Uco kills his father and wounds his father's right-hand man Eka. Having recently survived an ambush by Reza's corrupt cops, Rama intervenes, allowing Eka to escape, but is subdued and driven away to be executed. Eka saves Rama and, as he lies dying, reveals himself to be a fellow undercover officer, and asks Rama to take down the entire underworld. Meanwhile, Gotō is informed of Bangun's killing and that Reza is shifting his allegiance to Bejo and Uco. Enraged, Gotō declares war on Bejo, Uco, and Reza.

Rama calls Bunawar, who claims that Eka had gone rogue, and informs Rama that Reza is meeting Bejo and Uco at Bejo's restaurant. After being assured that his family is safe, Rama storms the restaurant, singlehandedly dispatching all of Bejo's henchmen. Uco, noticing that Bejo carries the same tattoo as the prison rioters and realizing that he had been set up, kills both Reza and Bejo amid the chaos. He then fires at Rama but Rama stabs him dead. As Bunawar makes his way to the restaurant, a badly wounded Rama encounters Gotō's men, led by Gotō's son Keiichi. An impressed Keiichi offers a deal to Rama, presumably a position within the yakuza. Rama declines, claiming that he is done.

== Cast ==
- Iko Uwais as Rama/Yuda, one of the three surviving police officers of the first film's eponymous raid, and a special forces member turned undercover agent. His alias "Yuda" is a reference to Uwais' character in his debut film Merantau.
- Arifin Putra as Uco, a vicious, petulant mobster who is the son and heir to Bangun.
- Oka Antara as Eka, Bangun's consigliere who holds a secret of his own.
- Tio Pakusadewo as Bangun, a notorious kingpin who is one of the two mob bosses in control of Jakarta's underworld.
- Alex Abbad as Bejo, a self-made Jakarta crime boss who considers himself very ambitious.
- Cecep Arif Rahman as "The Assassin", Bejo's top enforcer who uses the karambit as his signature weapon.
- Julie Estelle as Alicia/"Hammer Girl", Bejo's hitman, a merciless assassin who uses claw hammers as her signature weapon. She is deaf, and later revealed to be missing an eye, the reason she wears sunglasses at all times.
- Kenichi Endō as Hideaki Goto (Japanese: 後藤英明, Hepburn: Gotō Hideaki), founder and head (oyabun/kumicho) of the Goto family, a powerful yakuza family from Japan and one of the two mob bosses in control of Jakarta's underworld.
- Ryuhei Matsuda as Keiichi Goto (Japanese: 後藤圭一, Hepburn: Gotō Keiichi), Goto's son and heir.
- Kazuki Kitamura as Ryuichi (Japanese: 龍一, Hepburn: Ryūichi), Goto's lieutenant (Note: In the Yakuza underworld, those who hold the position of lieutenant (such as Ryūichi) are better known by the name Wakagashira (Japanese: 若頭, Hepburn: Wakagashira).) and interpreter.
- Yayan Ruhian as Prakoso, Bangun's most loyal and dedicated hitman. Ruhian previously portrayed Mad Dog in the first film.
- Very Tri Yulisman as "Baseball Bat Man", Alicia's brother and one of Bejo's top three hitmen.
- Cok Simbara as Bunawar, the head of the internal investigation unit who recruits Rama to bring down the police–mob collusion.
- Roy Marten as Reza, a corrupt high-ranking police official affiliated with the Gotos but whom Bejo wants to buy out in his plans for expansion.
- Epy Kusnandar as Topan, operator of an illegal "porn den" in Bangun's territory, who receives a visit when word gets out he's expanded into the drug business.
- Zack Lee as Benny, an associate of Uco in prison who betrays his trust.
- Donny Alamsyah as Andi, Rama's gangster brother who is executed by Bejo.
- Tegar Satrya as Bowo, Rama's colleague and one of three surviving officers of the first film's eponymous raid.
- Alain O. as Wahyu, the corrupt lieutenant and one of three surviving officers of the first film's eponymous raid.
- Marsha Timothy as Dwi, Prakoso's estranged wife.

Other cast members include Henky Solaiman and Fikha Effendi, who reprise their roles as Rama's father and wife, Isa, respectively. Deddy Sutomo and Pong Hardjatmo make cameos as the mediator and police commissioner, respectively. Additionally, Joe Taslim appears in photograph as Sergeant Jaka from the previous film.

== Production ==
=== Development ===
Writer-director Gareth Evans decided to make the sequel after The Raid hit at the box office. He saw it as an opportunity to receive funding for a script he wrote in 2009, Berandal, which he had trouble funding for two years. Berandal was originally conceived as a standalone action drama film which incorporates bigger action scenes and according to Evans tells the story of "a young guy who goes into prison, befriends the son of a mob boss, comes out, joins him as an enforcer and then has to survive a gang war". After The Raid, Evans began significantly rewriting the Berandal script to connect its storyline with that of the first film; the process included tweaking the protagonist's character motivation and adding a police procedural subplot.

=== Casting and filming ===
Julie Estelle was cast as "Hammer Girl" in December 2012; Evans also tweeted that internationally renowned silat practitioner Cecep Arif Rahman was also given a major part in the film. Marsha Timothy, Mathias Muchus, Tio Pakusadewo, and Alex Abbad, who worked with Evans in Merantau, were also cast in the film. Japanese actors Matsuda Ryuhei (known for his roles in Taboo and Nana), Kenichi Endō (known for his roles in Crows Zero, Crows Zero 2 and Dead or Alive 2: Birds) and Kitamura Kazuki, known for his roles in Young Thugs: Innocent Blood, Dead or Alive and Ley Lines, but also known for being the only one of the three Japanese actors appeared in Indonesian films, following his appearance in the 2014 film Killers.

Evans also revealed on Twitter that Yayan Ruhian, who played Mad Dog in The Raid, will return for the sequel as a new character called Prakoso, the machete-wielding chief assassin of Bangun. He claimed that he would not do a martial arts film without Ruhian being involved. Ruhian, who is also a choreographer for the film, trained Estelle in pencak silat.

In January 2013, PT Merantau Films and XYZ Films announced the start of production. The filming process took about seven months and ended in July 2013.

The film's lead cinematographer Matt Flannery tweeted that at least three RED cameras were used in a test shoot of a chase scene. Gareth Evans mentioned that they were using RED Scarlet for 95% of the shoot, Epic for slow mo, and Go Pro 3 for quick cuts during the car chase.

=== Marketing ===
A teaser trailer was released at Twitch Film on 6 November 2013. The Hollywood Reporter stated that the trailer "unleashes more action than most Hollywood blockbusters." A longer Indonesian trailer was released on 31 December 2013. The American trailer was released on 21 January 2014. On 26 March 2014, a deleted scene (given the title "Gang War") was released to promote the film.

== International release ==
The film was marketed internationally through Celluloid Nightmares, a partnership between US-based XYZ Films and France's Celluloid Dreams.

Sony Pictures Worldwide Acquisitions acquired the film's distribution rights for the United States, Latin America and Spain; and Kadokawa Pictures for Japan. Distribution rights to other countries were sold to eOne Entertainment for Canada and the United Kingdom; Koch Media for Germany, Switzerland and Austria; Calinos Films for Turkey; HGC for China; and Madman Entertainment for Australia.

== Release ==
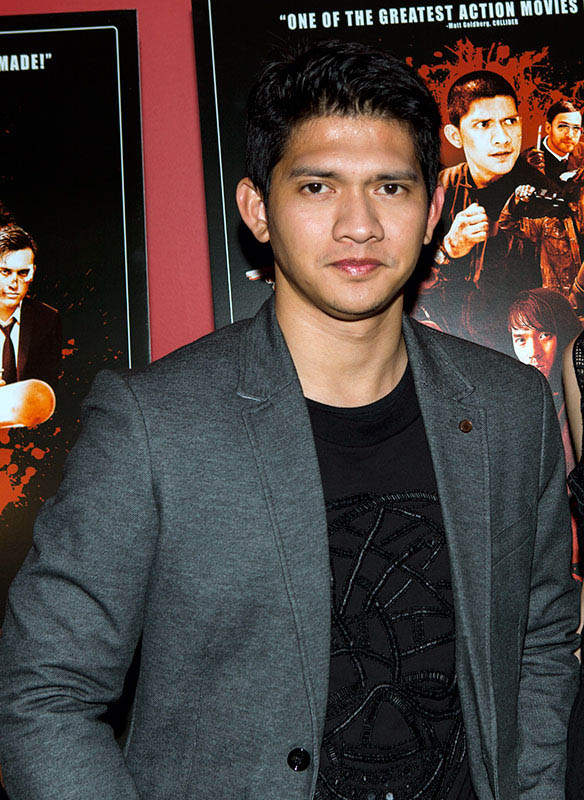
Iko Uwais at the premiere of The Raid 2 in New York City, 17 March 2014

The film had its world premiere at the 2014 Sundance Film Festival on 21 January 2014. It also screened at South by Southwest on 10 March 2014 and ARTE Indonesia Arts Festival on 14 March 2014. Following a wide release on 11 April 2014, due to low returns, the majority of theater owners pulled the film from their theaters one week later, similar to what occurred during the theatrical run of the first film.

=== Censorship ===
The Raid 2 was banned in neighboring Malaysia. The film was scheduled to hit Malaysian screens on 28 March, but had not been shown anywhere in the country due to its excessive violence. Indonesian politician, and former Army Chief of Staff, Pramono Edhie Wibowo criticized the decision and demanded an explanation. He further asked the Indonesian Ministry of Foreign Affairs to "actively perform its mediation function with the Malaysian government."

The US release was given an R rating by the MPAA for "strong bloody violence throughout, sexuality and language", cutting a few frames of graphic violence. Director Evans stated the cuts are very minimal and similar to his original cut. The film received an R-15 rating in Japan with 4 minutes cut, and the uncut version, which was given an R-18 rating, was screened in the Tokyo metropolitan area.

== Reception ==
=== Box office ===
In Indonesia, the film sold 1,434,272 tickets at the box office in 2014.

Overseas, the film grossed $2,627,209 in the United States and Canada. In Japan, it grossed ¥22 million ($207,655) at the box office. In other overseas territories outside Indonesia, the film grossed $3,939,707, for an overseas total of $6,774,571 outside of Indonesia.

=== Home media ===
In the United States, the film grossed $4.14 million from physical DVD and Blu-ray sales, as of April 2022. In the United Kingdom, The Raid 2 was 2015's best-selling foreign-language film on home video.

=== Critical response ===
As of January 2022, the film has an approval rating of 82% on review aggregation website Rotten Tomatoes, based on 175 reviews, with an average rating of 7.50/10. The site's consensus states: "Although its high-energy plot and over-the-top violence may play better with genre aficionados, The Raid 2 definitely delivers more of everything audiences loved about its predecessor." On Metacritic, the film has a weighted average score of 71 out of 100 based on reviews from 34 critics, indicating "generally favorable reviews".

During its world premiere at Sundance, The Raid 2 received an overwhelming reaction. Mark Olsen of the Los Angeles Times reported that "The screening caused an explosion of excitement and enthusiasm for the film on social media."

In a 3-out-of-5 mixed review, Joey Magidson of the website Awards Circuit wrote that he "appreciate(s) the directing skills on display in The Raid 2, but at a certain point, all of the fighting and killing nearly got to be too much for me. I'm recommending the film, but not in the same way as the last one." He added that while it is "creative enough to be worth a recommendation, it lacks the originality of the first flick" and concluded that "The Raid 2 will delight genre fans, but might not impress to[o] many others."

Peter Bradshaw of The Guardian gave the film 4 out of 5 stars and wrote that it "may not have the first Raid's absolute novelty, and the plot is a bit superfluous. But the sheer mayhem-stamina of this followup is really staggering." Henry Barnes of The Guardian gave it 3 out of 5 stars, writing "Out of the tower block and into Jakarta's crime underworld, Gareth Evans's gory sequel is even more violent – you'll thrill despite yourself."

Chris Nashawaty of Entertainment Weekly said, "The Raid 2 will make you feel like Christmas came nine months early. Some action sequels don't know when to say when. But here's one where too much is just the right amount."

Simon Abrams of RogerEbert.com praised the film for its "involving plot"; calling the cast, especially Uwais, "charming" and dialogue "winningly precise" while noting that the sequel is "a great step up after the already-impressive The Raid." Glenn Kenny of RogerEbert.com gave the film 2 out of 4 stars, and wrote "The action stuff in The Raid 2, while likely to alienate the squeamish and summon dark thoughts of cinematic nihilism amongst overthinking highbrows, really IS like nothing else out there."

David Rooney of The Hollywood Reporter gave the film a positive review, remarking, "Evans gives the audience a knowing wink by having Rama endure repeated batterings that would leave mere mortals in traction, not to mention some nasty blade wounds. Yet he keeps coming back, finding the stamina to snap more limbs and crush more skulls. Taking place inside moving vehicles, a subway car, a noodle bar, warehouses, a porn factory, tight corridors and in the most electrifying mano-a-mano clash, a gleaming nightclub kitchen and wine cellar, the fights are dynamite."

Rolling Stone chief critic Peter Travers wrote, "The Raid 2 lets its warriors rip for two and a half thrilling hours. With the precision of dance and the punch of a K.O. champion, Evans keeps the action coming like nobody's business."

Amber Wilkinson of The Daily Telegraph commented, "Hyper-violent it may be but there is beauty in its brutality," and wrote, "To say a martial arts movie brings something fresh in terms of choreography may sound like fighting talk, but Gareth Evans's sequel to his 2011 film is endlessly inventive."

Matt Risley of Total Film gave the film 5 stars and wrote: "Sumptuously shot, perfectly paced and flat-out exhilarating, The Raid 2 cements Evans as the best action director working today and may not be the best action, gangster, or even martial-arts movie ever made. But as a combination of all three, it's unparalleled in recent memory and offers a tantalising glimpse into a post-Bayhem action-movie world. Brutal, beautiful and brilliant" and also wrote, "The sheer imagination on show, both in the cinematography and choreography, guarantees each brawl is instantly iconic. Immaculately edited, each traumatic, tensely tactile fight would blur into chaos if not for Evans's pinpoint pacing something that refreshes all the more in the face of modern blockbusting's tendency to start big and just keep getting bigger, until burnout."

=== Year-end lists ===
The film appeared on several critics' year-end lists.

- #2 – Peter Freeman of DCOutlook.com's "Top 10 Movies of 2014"
- #7 – IMDb's "Top 10 Films of 2014"
- #10 – Drew McWeeny of HitFix's "Top 50 Films of 2014"
- #10 – DenOfGeek.com's "Top 10 Films of 2014"
- #14 – Rob Hunter of Film School Rejects' "14 Best Foreign Language Films of 2014"

=== Accolades ===
The Raid 2 garnered a number of domestic and international award wins and nominations.

On 19 December 2014, it won the award for Best Foreign Language Film from the Florida Film Critics Circle over Sweden's Force Majeure and Poland's Ida; a first for an Indonesian film. It also received two nominations at the 2014 Phoenix Film Critics Society Awards, for Best Stunts, and Best Foreign Language Film; losing the former to Edge of Tomorrow and the latter to Polish film, Ida. Another nomination came from the 2014 Chicago Film Critics Association Awards on the Best Foreign Language Film category, which it lost to Ruben Östlund's Force Majeure from Sweden. For the 8th Houston Film Critics Society Awards, it also received a nomination in the foreign film category, again losing to Force Majeure.

The film received 10 nominations at the local 2014 Maya Awards, organized by online film community Piala Maya. On 20 December 2014, it won four of its ten nominations: Best Cinematography for Matt Flanery and Dimas Subono, Best Editing for Evans and Andi Novianto, Best Special Effects, and Best Supporting Actor for Arifin Putra. It was also nominated for Best Film, Best Original Score, Most Memorable Featured Appearance for Julie Estelle as 'The Hammer Girl' (all three lost to Cahaya dari Timur); Best Hair & Make-Up and Best Sound Mixing (both lost to Killers), as well as another nomination in the Best Supporting Actor category for Oka Antara (who lost to co-star Arifin Putra).

Year	Award	Category	Nominee	Result
2014	Golden Trailer Awards	Best Foreign Action Trailer	The Raid 2	Nominated
2014	Florida Film Critics Circle	Best Foreign Language Film	The Raid 2	Won
2014	Phoenix Film Critics Society Awards	Best Foreign Language Film	The Raid 2	Nominated
2014	Phoenix Film Critics Society Awards	Best Stunts	The Raid 2	Nominated
2014	Chicago Film Critics Association Awards	Best Foreign Language Film	The Raid 2	Nominated
2014	3rd Maya Awards	Best Feature Film	The Raid 2	Nominated
2014	3rd Maya Awards	Best Actor in a Supporting Role	Arifin Putra	Won
2014	3rd Maya Awards	Best Actor in a Supporting Role	Oka Antara	Nominated
2014	3rd Maya Awards	Arifin C. Noer Award for Memorable Brief Appearance	Julie Estelle	Nominated
2014	3rd Maya Awards	Best Cinematography	Dimas Subono; Matt Flanery	Won
2014	3rd Maya Awards	Best Editing	Andi Novianto; Gareth Evans	Won
2014	3rd Maya Awards	Best Sound	Brandon Proctor; M. Ichsan Rachmaditta	Nominated
2014	3rd Maya Awards	Best Original Score	Aria Prayogi; Fajar Yuskemal; Joseph Trapanese	Nominated
2014	3rd Maya Awards	Best Visual Effects	Andi Noviandi	Won
2014	3rd Maya Awards	Best Makeup & Hairstyling	Kumalasari Tanara	Nominated
2014	3rd Maya Awards	Equator Film Expo Award for International Achievement	The Raid 2	Won
2014	3rd Maya Awards	Best DVD	The Raid 2	Won
2015	Houston Film Critics Society Awards	Best Foreign Language Film	The Raid 2	Nominated

== Cancelled sequel ==
On 6 January 2014, media outlets quoted director Gareth Evans stating that The Raid 3 would take place two hours before the end of The Raid 2. On 19 April, during an interview with Metro, director Evans said that he is planning to take a break from martial arts movies for two or three years before filming it. On 21 January 2015, Evans responded on Twitter, "The Raid 3 isn't going to be happening anytime soon. Ideas in my head. Nothing written. No set date. 2018/19 possibly."

In a November 2016 interview with Impact, Evans stated the third film was no longer going forward with the franchise likely having ended, stating, "Moving back to UK felt like a closing chapter on that franchise—we ended the story pretty neatly (I feel) in Part 2. I'm aware there's an interest for it [...] So never say never, but it's unlikely to happen anytime soon."

== Sources ==
- "The Raid 2 International Press Kit" (PDF). XYZ Films.
