= The Jungle School =

2013 drama film

- Theatrical release poster
- Directed by: Riri Riza
- Written by: Riri Riza
- Based on: Sokola Rimba by Butet Manurung
- Produced by: Mira Lesmana
- Starring: Prisia Nasution
- Cinematography: Gunnar Nimpuno
- Edited by: W. Ichwandiardono
- Music by: Aksan Sjuman
- Production company: Miles Films
- Release date: 21 November 2013 (Indonesia)
- Running time: 90 minutes
- Country: Indonesia
- Language: Indonesian

The Jungle School (Indonesian: Sokola Rimba) is a 2013 biographical drama film written and directed by Riri Riza. It follows the life of the anthropologist and educator Butet Manurung, portrayed by Prisia Nasution.

The film was theatrically released in Indonesia on 21 November 2013. It won the Best Feature Film at the 2013 Maya Awards. It also received nine nominations at the 2014 Indonesian Film Festival, winning two for Best Adapted Screenplay and Best Child Performer for Nengkabau Sunting.

== Premise ==
The Jungle School follows the life of anthropologist and educator Butet Manurung who teaches Orang Rimba children living in Bukit Duabelas National Park, Jambi, to read and count.

== Cast ==
- Prisia Nasution as Butet Manurung
- Rukman Rosadi as Bahar
- Nyungsang Bungo as Bungo
- Nengkabau Sunting as Nengkabau

== Production ==
In October 2013, it was announced Miles Films had optioned the autobiographical book Sokola Rimba by anthropologist and educator Butet Manurung. Principal photography began in June 2013 and took place in Jambi. More than eighty Orang Rimba people took part during the filming.

== Release ==
The Jungle School was released theatrically in Indonesia on 21 November 2013. It garnered 39,443 admissions during its theatrical run.

== Accolades ==
Award / Film Festival	Date of ceremony	Category	Recipient(s)	Result	Ref.
Maya Awards	21 December 2013	Best Feature Film	The Jungle School	Won	
Maya Awards	21 December 2013	Best Director	Riri Riza	Nominated	
Maya Awards	21 December 2013	Best Actress in a Leading Role	Prisia Nasution	Nominated	
Maya Awards	21 December 2013	Best Young Performer	Nyungsang Bungo	Nominated	
Maya Awards	21 December 2013	Best Adapted Screenplay	Riri Riza	Nominated	
Maya Awards	21 December 2013	Best Sound	Satrio Budiono	Nominated	
Maya Awards	21 December 2013	Best Film Score	Aksan Sjuman	Nominated	
Indonesian Film Festival	6 December 2014	Best Picture	Mira Lesmana	Nominated	
Indonesian Film Festival	6 December 2014	Best Director	Riri Riza	Nominated	
Indonesian Film Festival	6 December 2014	Best Actress	Prisia Nasution	Nominated	
Indonesian Film Festival	6 December 2014	Best Adapted Screenplay	Riri Riza	Won	
Indonesian Film Festival	6 December 2014	Best Film Editing	W. Ichwandiardono	Nominated	
Indonesian Film Festival	6 December 2014	Best Original Score	Aksan Sjuman	Nominated	
Indonesian Film Festival	6 December 2014	Best Sound	Yusuf A. Patawari and Satrio Budiono	Nominated	
Indonesian Film Festival	6 December 2014	Best Art Direction	Eros Eflin	Nominated	
Indonesian Film Festival	6 December 2014	Best Child Performer	Nengkabau Sunting	Won (Note: Shared with Tissa Biani for her performance in 3 Nafas Likas.)	
