= Prisia Nasution =

Indonesian actress, model, and martial artist

- Born: Prisia Wulansari Nasution; 1 June 1984 (age 42); Jakarta, Indonesia
- Other name: Prisia Nasution
- Occupations: Model; Actress; Martial Artist
- Years active: 2008–present
- Spouses: Ananda Siregar (2007–2012); Iedil Dzuhrie Alaudin (2016–present)
- Parent(s): Robert Nasution (father); Siti Sundari (mother)
- Awards: Citra Award for Best Leading Actress

Prisia Wulansari Nasution or better known as Prisia Nasution (born in Jakarta, Indonesia 1 June 1984) is an Indonesian actress, model and martial artist of mixed Javanese and Batak descent.

== Biography ==
=== Early life ===
Nasution was born in Jakarta, Indonesia on 1 June 1984.

Beginning in junior high school, Nasution joined the national training camp for the Indonesian martial art pencak silat. She later attended Swiss German University, majoring in information technology.

In 2003, during her university studies, Nasution was offered a chance to become a runway model. She accepted as she thought it would be an easy way to earn money, but soon discovered that she lacked the confidence to do it professionally; in a 2011 interview with The Jakarta Post she said her thighs were too big, making her body "defective" for modelling.

=== Acting career ===
After retiring from modelling, Nasution was cast in several TV movies. She was later cast in Ifa Isfansyah's 2011 movie Sang Penari (The Dancer) as the lead female character, Srintil, after two casting sessions; when her first audition failed, she read the original novel by Ahmad Tohari and decided that she could not take no for an answer. To prepare for the role, she spent time as a ronggeng in Banyumas, Central Java, practising dancing and learning the language spoken there; she also spent a period eating less to better portray a malnourished rural girl.

As of January 2012, Nasution is playing in the TV series Laskar Pelangi – The Series (Rainbow Warriors – The Series), based on the novel by Andrea Hirata. She is also writing an original screenplay about parallel lives in the 1940s and 2010s.

== Awards and nominations ==
Year	Award	Category	Recipients	Result
2011	Indonesian Film Festival	Citra Award for Best Leading Actress	Sang Penari	Won
2012	Indonesian Movie Awards	Best Chemistry (with Oka Antara)	Sang Penari	Nominated
2013	Maya Award	Best Actress in a Leading Role	The Jungle School	Nominated
2014	Indonesian Film Festival	Citra Award for Best Leading Actress	The Jungle School	Nominated
2015	Maya Award	Best Actress in a Supporting Role	Comic 8: Casino Kings Part 1	Nominated
2015	Indonesian Film Festival	Citra Award for Best Supporting Actress	Comic 8: Casino Kings Part 1	Nominated
2018	Indonesian Film Festival	Citra Award for Best Leading Actress	Lima	Nominated

== Personal life ==
Nasution was married to Ananda Siregar. The couple divorced on 4 January 2012 after going to court 11 times for discussions.
