= Adi Kurdi =

Indonesian actor (1948–2020)

Adi Kurdi (September 22, 1948 – May 8, 2020) was an Indonesian film and television actor known for his role as Abah in the television drama series, Keluarga Cemara, which aired from 1996 (beginning on RCTI) until 2005, with a series finale on TV7 (now known as Trans7). His film credits included Aku Ingin Menciummu Sekali Saja (2002), Anak-Anak Borobudur (2007), and 3 Hari Untuk Selamanya (2007). Kurdi won the Maya Award for Best Actor in a Supporting Role for the film Catatan Dodol Calon Dokter in 2016

== Biography ==
Kurdi was born in Pekalongan, Central Java, on September 22, 1948. He began acting in 1970 by joining the Bengkel Teater theater company, which was headed by actor and poet, Willibrordus S. Rendra. Kurdi transitioned to film roles in the 1980s, beginning with Gadis Penakluk (1980) and Putri Seorang Jendral (1981). His work in Gadis Penakluk earned him a "Best Newcomer" award at the Indonesian Film Festival in 1981, as well as a nomination for "Best Actor" at the same festival.

In 2016, Kurdi won for Maya Award for Best Actor in a Supporting Role for his role in Catatan Dodol Calon Dokter (Silly Accounts of a Doctor-To-Be). He was also honored with the Lifetime Achievement Award at the 2018 Indonesian Movie Actor Awards.

Adi Kurdi died at the National Brain Center Hospital in East Jakarta on May 8, 2020, at the age of 71.
