= Killers (2014 film) =

2014 Japanese-Indonesian horror thriller film

- Killers at the 2014 Sundance Film Festival
- Directed by: The Mo Brothers
- Written by: Takuji Ushiyama; Timo Tjahjanto
- Produced by: Yoshinori Chiba; Shinjiro Nishimura; Takuji Ushiyama; Kimo Stamboel; Timo Tjahjanto
- Starring: Kazuki Kitamura; Oka Antara; Rin Takanashi; Luna Maya
- Cinematography: Gunnar Nimpuno
- Edited by: Arifin Marhan Japri
- Music by: Fajar Yuskemal; Aria Prayogi
- Production companies: Nikkatsu; Guerilla Merah Films; Merantau Films; Million Pictures; DAMN! I Love Indonesia Movies
- Distributed by: XYZ Films; Lionsgate
- Release dates: 20 January 2014 (Sundance); 1 February 2014 (Japan); 6 February 2014 (Indonesia)
- Running time: 137 minutes
- Countries: Japan; Indonesia
- Languages: Japanese; Indonesian; English

Killers (Japanese: キラーズ, "Kirazu") is a 2014 neo-noir action horror film directed by Indonesian directing duo The Mo Brothers. A co-production between Japan and Indonesia, the screenplay was written by Takuji Ushiyama and The Mo Brothers' Timo Tjahjanto with Kazuki Kitamura and Oka Antara in the starring roles. The film won two out of its three nominations at the 34th Citra Awards, for Best Original Score and Best Sound.

== Synopsis ==
Nomura Shuhei (Kazuki Kitamura) is a young Japanese executive in Tokyo who is charismatic and well-liked but has a darker side. He killed several people and documented his violent crimes online. In addition, he uploaded the video of the murder to the Internet for all to see for his satisfaction.

Meanwhile, in Jakarta, Bayu Aditya (Oka Antara), an ambitious journalist from Indonesia. He suffers from his obsession with uncovering the case of a politician named Dharma (Ray Sahetapy). This caused the breakup of his relationship with his wife Dina (Luna Maya), and his career fell apart.

When his life is filled with problems, Bayu watches one of Nomura's videos and finds another side to his personality. Bayu then feels inspired to become a serial killer. He starts to shape his character and kills as a rogue vigilante in the name of justice. Bayu uploads videos of his murdering spree to the Internet for the world to see.

Unexpectedly, Bayu's video received a response like that of Nomura. They both connect via the Internet, and their bond becomes more complicated. A psychotic game of cat and mouse ensues as the two men battle for notoriety. Soon it becomes clear that it is only a matter of time until the two killers square off face to face.

== Cast ==
- Kazuki Kitamura as Nomura Shuhei
- Oka Antara as Bayu Aditya
- Rin Takanashi as Hisae Kawahara
- Luna Maya as Dina Aditya, Bayu's wife
- Ray Sahetapy as Dharma
- Ersya Aurelia as Elly Aditya
- Epy Kusnandar as Robert
- Mei Kurokawa as Midori
- Denden as Jyukai's father
- Motoki Fukami as Officer Muroi
- Tara Basro as Dewi

== Production ==
The film is a co-production between Indonesia's Guerilla Merah Films and Japan's Nikkatsu in association with XYZ Films, marking the first feature film co-production between Japan and Indonesia. Tjahjanto mentioned in an interview that the idea for the film came from Ushiyama who, upon viewing the duo's breakout hit Macabre, proposed a slasher story involving two masked killers competing to kill people on the internet.

The film's production also involved contributions from Gareth Evans' Merantau Films, Million Pictures, and Daniel Mananta's DAMN! I Love Indonesia Movies.

== Release ==
Killers premiered in the Park City Midnight section of the 2014 Sundance Film Festival in 20 January as an official selection. It then received a theatrical release in Japan on 1 February and in Indonesia in 6 February. In the following months, the film was screened in multiple international film festivals. It was subsequently purchased for distribution in several top markets, including Germany by Tiberius Film GmbH, France by Wild Side Films, Turkey by Calinos Films, Hong Kong by Sundream Motion Pictures, United Kingdom by Lionsgate, North America by Well Go USA Entertainment, and Australia & New Zealand by Vendetta Films. Well Go USA Entertainment released the film in limited screens on 23 January 2015 and on DVD & Blu-ray on 7 April 2015.

There are few differences between the Indonesian, Japanese, and International theatrical versions. The Indonesian version has been edited with scenes containing excessive violence and nudity being removed or softened to comply with local censorship regulations, while the Japanese and International theatrical versions contains scenes omitted from the Indonesian version.

== Reception ==
On Rotten Tomatoes, the film has a 73% score based on 15 verified reviews as of February 2021, indicating generally favorable reviews. In a positive review, Martin Tsai of the Los Angeles Times wrote, "This seemingly generic thriller has plenty of twists in store, but perhaps none as surprising and impressive as its ability to manipulate the viewer–first to side with the villains, then to question one's own core beliefs." Conversely, Simon Abrams of The Village Voice called the film an "amateurishly realized sensationalism", criticizing Nomura's and Bayu's characters as "generically morbid sociopaths with way too much time, and blood, on their hands".

== Awards and nominations ==
Year	Award	Category	Recipient	Result
2014	34th Citra Awards	Best Original Score	Fajar Yuskemal	Won
2014	34th Citra Awards	Best Sound	Fajar Yuskemal; Aria Prayogi	Won
2014	34th Citra Awards	Best Visual Effects	Andromedha Pradana	Nominated
2014	3rd Maya Awards	Best Cinematography	Gunnar Nimpuno	Nominated
2014	3rd Maya Awards	Best Original Score	Fajar Yuskemal	Nominated
2014	3rd Maya Awards	Best Sound	Fajar Yuskemal; Aria Prayogi	Won
2014	3rd Maya Awards	Best Makeup & Hairstyling	Kumalasari Tanara	Won
2015	Golden Trailer Awards	Best Foreign Action Trailer	Red Circle Productions	Nominated
2015	Golden Trailer Awards	Best Foreign Thriller Trailer	Red Circle Productions; Well Go USA Entertainment	Nominated
2016	Fantaspoa International Fantastic Film Festival	Best Bloodbath Honorable Mention	The Mo Brothers	Won
