= Aditya Ahmad =

Indonesian filmmaker (born 1989)

- Born: Adityahmad Mahmuddin; 29 May 1989 (age 37); Makassar, South Sulawesi, Indonesia
- Occupations: Director; writer; producer; cinematographer
- Years active: 2013–present

Aditya Ahmad (born 29 May 1989) is an Indonesian filmmaker. His graduation short film On Stopping the Rain received a Special Mention at the Children's Jury Generation Kplus section of 64th Berlin International Film Festival in 2014. His 2018 short film A Gift had its world premiere at the 75th Venice International Film Festival and won the Orizzonti Prize for Best Short.

== Career ==
In 2006, Ahmad participated in a workshop held by the British Council and directed a video diary titled Pagar. He then studied Film and Television at the Institut Kesenian Makassar. His graduation film, On Stopping the Rain competed at the Short Film section of the 2013 Jogja-NETPAC Asian Film Festival and won the Special Mention. It had its international premiere at the 64th Berlin International Film Festival at the Generation Kplus section, where it won the Special Mention selected by the Children's Jury. It was also nominated for the Citra Award for Best Live Action Short Film at the 2014 Indonesian Film Festival. In 2014, he was selected to participate at the Asian Film Academy, held during the 19th Busan International Film Festival. He was also selected to participate in Berlinale Talents in 2015.

In 2018, his short film A Gift, produced by Mira Lesmana and Riri Riza, had its world premiere at the 75th Venice International Film Festival. It won the Orizzonti Prize for Best Short. It also won the Citra Award for Best Live Action Short Film at the 2018 Indonesian Film Festival.

In 2024, Ahmad was selected to develop his directorial debut film Goldfish during the Cinéfondation La Résidence program in Cannes, France. He also participated at the 2025 TorinoFilmLab Script Lab to develop the screenplay.

== Filmography ==
=== Film ===
Year	Title	Director	Writer	Producer	Notes	Ref.
2013	On Stopping the Rain	Yes	Yes	Yes	Short	
2013	The Jungle School	No	No	No	As behind the scene director	
2014	The Golden Cane Warrior	No	No	No	As behind the scene director	
2015	Save Our Forest Giants	Yes	Yes	No	Documentary short	
2016	Ada Apa Dengan Cinta? 2	No	No	No	As second assistant director	
2016	Athirah	No	No	No	As second assistant director	
2018	A Gift	Yes	Yes	No	Short	
2019	Semesta	No	No	No	As cinematographer	
2022	Piknik Pesona	Yes	No	No	Segment: "I"	
TBA	Goldfish	Yes	Yes	No	In development	

=== Television ===
Year	Title	Network	Notes	Ref.
2020	Saiyo Sakato	GoPlay	9 episodes	

=== Music videos ===
Year	Song	Artist	Ref.
2013	"Sokola Rimba"	Bubugiri	
2016	"Ruang Bahagia"	Endah N Rhesa	
2020	"Reflection"	Yura Yunita, SIVIA, Agatha Pricilla, and Nadin Amizah	
