= In the Absence of the Sun =

2014 Indonesian film

- Theatrical release poster
- Directed by: Lucky Kuswandi
- Written by: Lucky Kuswandi
- Screenplay by: Lucky Kuswandi; Ucu Agustin
- Produced by: Sammaria Simanjuntak; Sharon Simanjuntak
- Starring: Adinia Wirasti; Ina Panggabean; Dayu Wijanto; Marissa Anita; Dira Sugandi; Trisa Triandesa
- Cinematography: Budi Sasono
- Edited by: Lucky Kuswandi
- Production companies: Kepompong Gendut Films; Soda Machine Films
- Distributed by: Rapi Films
- Release date: 2014
- Running time: 95 minutes
- Country: Indonesia
- Languages: Indonesian; English

In the Absence of the Sun (Indonesian: Selamat Pagi, Malam) is a 2014 Indonesian film written and directed by Lucky Kuswandi. The film takes place over one night in Jakarta and focuses on three women and the relationships that form from unexpected encounters.

Selamat Pagi, Malam was the opening film at the 2015 Asia House Film Festival closing film at the 2014 Singapore International Film Festival. It was an official selection at the 2015 Los Angeles Asia Pacific Film Festival.

== Plot ==
Gia is a filmmaker who returns to Jakarta after spending the past few years in New York. Though she has returned, she no longer feels that Jakarta is her home. As she is unpacking she finds photos of Naomi, her old soulmate in New York who also returned to Jakarta, and decides to call her. They agree to meet for dinner and after bumping into Naomi's rich friends, Gia finds out that Naomi is engaged. They leave the restaurant and catch up as they take a walk and eat street food. On their way home, Gia sees a love hotel and convinces Naomi to go. They talk about what could have been and Gia tells Naomi they could restart with each other. After Naomi almost kisses Gia, they end up hugging and consoling each other.

Ci Surya is a widow to a successful businessman. While looking through her late husband's closet, she finds a note in his wallet from a love hotel with the name "Sophia" and a phone number on it. She calls the number and confirms that her husband had been cheating on her. She goes to the hotel and books a room for the night. Finding out that Sofia is a performer at the hotel, Ci goes to the hotel bar and finds out that Sofia is married and that she and her husband are escorts. Ci brings Sofia's husband back to her room and pays him to have sex. She leaves a note on the bedside table with her number and her name.

Indri works at a gym and has a date with a rich man she met online, Davit. As she's finishing her shift, she cleans the locker room and steals a pair of high heels. At the restaurant she thinks she's been stood up, but upon meeting Davit she realizes she was catfished. Davit takes rude business calls at the table and tells Indri that he already booked them a room at the love hotel. Davit angrily insults her after she second guessed the date, she goes to the restroom, crying and comes back to find that Davit has left and made her responsible for the check. Unable to pay, she runs out of the restaurant. She meets a street food vendor who cheers her up, and she tells him that it's her birthday. They decide to go to the love hotel together and take Davit's reservation. They have sex and afterwards they talk and laugh.

== Cast ==
- Adinia Wirasti as Gia
- Marissa Anita as Naomi
- Dayu Wijanto as Ci Surya
- Ina Panggabean as Indri
- Dira Sugandi as Sofia
- Paul Agusta as Davit
- Trisa Triandesa as Faisal
- Aming as Lone Star hostess

== Awards and nominations ==
List of awards and nominations
Award/Festival	Category	Recipient(s)	Result
Indonesian Movie Actors Awards	Best Supporting Actress	Marissa Anita	Nominated
Indonesian Movie Actors Awards	Best Chemistry	Adinia Wirasti and Marissa Anita	Nominated
Maya Awards	Best Feature Film		Nominated
Maya Awards	Best Director	Lucky Kuswandi	Nominated
Maya Awards	Best Original Screenplay	Lucky Kuswandi	Nominated
Maya Awards	Best Editing	Lucky Kuswandi	Nominated
Maya Awards	Best New Actress	Marissa Anita	Won
Maya Awards	Best New Actress	Dayu Wijanto	Nominated
Bandung Film Festival	Best Supporting Actress	Marissa Anita	Nominated
Bandung Film Festival	Best Screenwriter	Lucky Kuswandi	Nominated
Indonesian Film Festival	Best Director	Lucky Kuswandi	Nominated
Indonesian Film Festival	Best Original Screenplay	Lucky Kuswandi	Nominated
Indonesian Film Festival	Best Score	Ivan Gojaya	Nominated
Tokyo International Film Festival	Asian Future Best Film Award		Nominated
Hong Kong Asian Film Festival	New Talent Award	Lucky Kuswandi	Nominated
