= Haji Backpacker =

- Film poster
- Directed by: Danial Rifki
- Written by: Jujur Prananto; Danial Rifki
- Based on: Haji Backpacker by Aguk Irawan
- Produced by: HB Naveen; Frederica
- Starring: Abimana Aryasatya; Dewi Sandra; Laudya Cynthia Bella; Laura Basuki; Pipik Dian Irawati; Ray Sahetapy; Dion Wiyoko; Kenes Andari; Fita A. Ilham
- Cinematography: Yoyok Budi Santoso
- Edited by: Andi Mamo
- Music by: Indra Q
- Production company: Falcon Pictures
- Release date: 2 October 2014
- Running time: 107 minutes
- Country: Indonesia
- Languages: Indonesian; English

Haji Backpacker is a 2014 Indonesian film directed by Danial Rifki and released on 2 October 2014. The film, based on the novel of the same name by Aguk Irawan, stars Abimana Aryasatya, Dewi Sandra, Laudya Cynthia Bella, Laura Basuki, Pipik Dian Irawati, Ray Sahetapy, Dion Wiyoko, and Kenes Andari.

== Cast ==
- Abimana Aryasatya as Mada
- Dewi Sandra as Sophia
- Laudya Cynthia Bella as Mariani/Marbel
- Laura Basuki as Su Chun
- Pipik Dian Irawati as Mada's mother
- Ray Sahetapy as Mada's father
- HB Naveen as interrogator
- Dion Wiyoko
- Kenes Andari

== Filming process ==
It was filmed in five countries in Asia: China, Saudi Arabia, Thailand, India, and Iran, before returning to Indonesia to continue the process of shooting at several places in the country. Many stories came when film director, Danial Rifki, was filmed in five countries.

Filming in 5 countries required permits to be obtained.

This film then went to Vietnam, Tibet, and Nepal to complete the process of shooting.

== Awards and nominations ==
Year	Awards	Category	Recipients	Results
2014	Indonesian Film Festival	Best Leading Actor	Abimana Aryasatya	Nominated
2014	Indonesian Film Festival	Best Supporting Actress	Laura Basuki	Nominated
2014	Maya Awards	Best Actress in a Supporting Role	Laura Basuki	Nominated
2014	Maya Awards	Best Costume Design	Quartini Sari & Judith Tedjamulja	Nominated
2014	Maya Awards	Arifin C. Noer Award (Non Effectively Brief Appearance)	Laudya Cynthia Bella	Nominated
2015	Indonesian Movie Awards	Best Actor	Abimana Aryasatya	Nominated
2015	Indonesian Movie Awards	Best Supporting Actress	Laura Basuki	Won
2015	Indonesian Movie Awards	Best Newcomer Actor/Actress	HB Naveen	Nominated
2015	Indonesian Movie Awards	Favorite Actor	Abimana Aryasatya	Nominated
2015	Indonesian Movie Awards	Favorite Newcomer Actor/Actress	HB Naveen	Nominated
