= Widi Dwinanda =

Indonesian actor

- Born: Widi Dwinanda; January 10, 1988 (age 38); Cianjur, West Java, Indonesia
- Other names: Widi, Dwi
- Occupations: Celebrity; Sportscaster; Presenter; Writer; Voice Talent; Painter
- Years active: 2008 - present

Widi Dwinanda (born Cianjur, West Java on January 10, 1988) is an Indonesian actor, presenter and sportscaster. In 2015, she was awarded Commendable Female Actress for the category on Television Movies via Biopic Television Movies Ibu Een Guru Qolbu.

== Filmography ==
=== Film ===
Years	Titles	Roles	Notes
2013	Soekarno: Indonesia Merdeka	Ratna Djoeami	
2016	Indera Ke Enam	Merry	
2017	Hujan Bulan Juni	Dewi	
2017	My Crazy Girlfriend		

=== Television movies and host ===
Years	Titles	Roles	Notes
2008–2009	Sahabat Alam	Presenter	
2009	Jejak Petualang	Presenter	
2011–2014	Ayo Sekolah	Presenter	
2011–2014	Gulalie	Presenter	
2012	Maaf, Lebaran Ini Kami Tidak Pulang	Raini	Television Movies
2012	City Trip	Presenter	
2012	Cemal Cemil	Presenter	
2013–2014	Indonesia Menentukan	Presenter	
2013–2014	Kuliner Heboh	Presenter	
2013–2014	Lensa Indonesia Siang	Presenter	
2014–2015	Smart Living	Presenter	
2014–2015	Small Space	Presenter	
2014–2015	Kamus Desain	Presenter	
2015	Ibu Een Guru Qolbu	Ibu Een	Won as Television Movies Commendable Female Actress Category Television Movies on Festival Film Bandung 2015
2016–Present	Kompas Sport	Presenter	News Anchors of Kompas TV
2016–Present	Bincang Kita	Presenter	News Anchors of Kompas TV
2016–Present	Bingkai Inspirasi	Presenter	News Anchors of Kompas TV
2016–2017	Lintas Petang Weekend	Presenter	
2016–2017	Weekend Yuk	Presenter	News Anchors of Kompas TV
2017–Present	Inspirasi Sehat	Presenter	News Anchors of Kompas TV
2017–Present	Inspirasi Usaha	Presenter	News Anchors of Kompas TV
2018	Cuma Disini	Tuti	
2018–Present	Silet	Presenter	
2018–Present	Kompas Shop (K-Shop) (Kompas TV)	Presenter	News Anchors of Kompas TV
2018	Prasangka		Television Movies
2019	Meong		Television Movies
2019	Merindu Baitullah	Presenter	News Anchors of Kompas TV
2019	Sehat Islami	Presenter	News Anchors of Kompas TV
2023–present	Ngopi (Ngobrol Pintar)	Presenter	News Anchors of Kompas TV
