= Yayu Unru =

Indonesian actor (1962–2023)

- Unru as Agus Hidayat in The Last of Us, 2023
- Born: Andi Wahyuddin Unru; 4 June 1962; Makassar, South Sulawesi, Indonesia
- Died: 8 December 2023 (aged 61)
- Other name: Yayu Unru
- Education: Jakarta Institute of Arts
- Occupations: Actor; Acting Coach
- Years active: 1985–2023
- Spouse: Nita Unru (m. 1998)
- Children: 3

Andi Wahyuddin Unru (4 June 1962 – 8 December 2023), better known as Yayu Unru, was an Indonesian actor and acting coach.

== Career ==
In 2017, Yayu played Amang in Night Bus, directed by Emil Heradi. Yayu played a thief in Marlina the Murderer in Four Acts, which has good reviews. He also played Ayah Lala in Posesif, directed by Edwin.

In 2023, Yayu played Agus Hidayat in The Last of Us.

== Personal life and death ==
Yayu Unru married Nita on 23 February 1998. They had two daughters, Nazalna Zania Andi Unru and Widja Malaika Andi Unru, as well as a son, Fatih Unru, who is a comic and actor.

Yayu Unru died from a heart attack on 8 December 2023, at the age of 61.

== Filmography ==
=== Film ===
Year	Title	Role	Notes	Ref.
1985	Demam Tari			
2008	Mengaku Rasul	Bapak Marni		
2009	Jermal	Bandi		
2009	Kembang Perawan	Paranormal		
2009	Sang Pemimpi	Bang Rokib		
2011	Rindu Purnama	A Plumber		
2011	Pirate Brothers			
2011	Lovely Man	The gang's bos		
2011	Sang Penari	Mandor		
2012	Jakarta Hati	Taxi driver		
2013	Mursala	Public Prosecutor		
2013	Something in the Way	Ustaz		
2014	2014	Chief Judge		
2014	Sebelum Pagi Terulang Kembali	Sulaiman		
2014	Seputih Cinta Melati	Pak Haji		
2014	Tabula Rasa	Parmanto		
2015	Kapan Kawin?	Wisnu		
2016	Midnight Show	Purno		
2016	Teater Tanpa Kata: Sena Didi Mime	An Informant	Documentary Short Movie	
2016	Bangkit!	Prof. Dr. Irwan Pongky		
2016	#66	Norman		
2016	Bulan Terbelah di Langit Amerika 2			
2016	Headshot	Romli		
2017	Perfect Dream	Taxi driver		
2017	Night Bus	Amang / Zakaria Zulfikar		
2017	Marlina si Pembunuh dalam Empat Babak	A thief		
2017	Posesif	Ayah Lala		
2017	Surat Cinta untuk Starla the Movie	Kakek Hema		
2018	Jelita Sejuba: Mencintai Kesatria Negara	Abas		
2018	Tentang Kita dan Kisah-Kisah Setelahnya	Bimo	Short movie	
2018	Kafir: Bersekutu dengan Setan	Village head		
2018	Wiro Sableng: Pendekar Kapak Maut Naga Geni 212	Mr.Know-it-all		
2018	Something in Between	Pak Maman		
2018	A Man Called Ahok	Suyan		
2018	Menunggu Pagi	Benny		
2019	MatiAnak	Rosman		
2019	Lasagna	Rudi	Short movie	
2019	Koki-Koki Cilik 2	Bayu		
2019	Dilarang Menyanyi di Kamar Mandi	Yayu		
2019	Love for Sale 2	Ibrahim		
2019	Ratu Ilmu Hitam	Pak Bandi		
2019	99 Nama Cinta	Kiai Muchtar		
2020	De Oost	Village head	Prime Video original movie	
2020	Bidadari Mencari Sayap	Village headman who rides an online taxi	Disney+ Hotstar original movie	
2021	A Perfect Fit	Pak Ketut	Netflix original movie	
2021	Serigala Langit	Rudi	MAXstream original movie	
2021	Kamu Tidak Sendiri	Majid		
2021	Akhirat: A Love Story	Gotot		
2021	Menunggu Bunda	Karso	KlikFilm original movie	
2022	Ben & Jody	Hamid		
2022	Gara-Gara Warisan	Dahlan Lesmana		
2022	Keluarga Cemara 2	Aki		
2022	Madu Murni	Rasyid		
2022	Ivanna	Kakek Farid		
2023	Mangkujiwo 2	Dargo Sentono		
2023	Jamojaya	James' father		

=== Web series ===
Year	Title	Role	Notes	Ref.
2018, 2020	Brata	Arifin Adhysata	2 season	
2020	Sarung Milik Ayah	Arifin		
2022	Drama Ratu Drama	Yuliardi Syaifullah / Yuliardi Gunawan		
TBA	Ketua BEM and His Secret Wife			

=== TV series ===
Year	Title	Role	Notes	Ref.
1994	Kepak Sayap Merpati Muda			
2002	Alung	Kipling		
2003	Wong Cilik			
2022	Trio Gabut Kursus Iman	Kiai Basra		
2023	The Last of Us	Agus Hidayat	Episode: "Infected"	

=== Musical drama ===
- Jakarta Love Riot (2010, 2011)

== Awards and nominations ==
Year	Association	Category	Nominated work	Result
2010	Indonesian Movie Actors Awards	For Best Supporting Actor	Jermal	Nominated
2014	Festival Film Indonesia	For Best Supporting Actor	Tabula Rasa	Won
2014	Piala Maya	For Best Supporting Actor	Tabula Rasa	Nominated
2015	Indonesian Movie Actors Awards	For Best Supporting Actor	Tabula Rasa	Nominated
2015	Festival Film Bandung	Actors in Male Commendation in Cinema Movies	Tabula Rasa	Nominated
2017	Festival Film Indonesia	For Best Supporting Actor	Posesif	Won
2017	Festival Film Tempo	Featured Supporting Actor	Posesif	Nominated
2018	Indonesian Movie Actors Awards	For Best Supporting Actor	Night Bus	Nominated
2018	Indonesian Movie Actors Awards	Favorite Supporting Male Actor	Night Bus	Nominated
2018	Film Pilihan Tempo	Featured Supporting Actor	Menunggu Pagi	Won
2022	Indonesian Movie Actors Awards	For Best Leading Actor	Gara-Gara Warisan	Nominated
2022	Indonesian Movie Actors Awards	Favorite Main Male Actor	Gara-Gara Warisan	Nominated
