= The Dancer (2011 film) =

2011 film by Ifa Isfansyah

- Promotional poster
- Indonesian: Sang Penari
- Directed by: Ifa Isfansyah
- Written by: Salman Aristo; Ifa Isfansyah; Shanty Harmayn
- Based on: Ronggeng Dukuh Paruk by Ahmad Tohari
- Produced by: Shanty Harmayn
- Starring: Nyoman Oka Antara; Prisia Nasution
- Cinematography: Yadi Sugandi
- Music by: Wong Aksan; Titi Sjuman
- Production companies: Kompas Gramedia Productions; Indika Pictures; Salto Film Company
- Release date: 10 November 2011 (Indonesia)
- Running time: 111 minutes
- Country: Indonesia
- Languages: Indonesian, Banyumasan

The Dancer (Indonesian: Sang Penari) is a 2011 Indonesian film based on the trilogy of novels Ronggeng Dukuh Paruk by Ahmad Tohari and directed by Ifa Isfansyah. Starring Nyoman Oka Antara and Prisia Nasution, it tells the story of a young man and his friendship with his small village's new ronggeng.

The second adaptation of the Ronggeng Dukuh Paruk trilogy, Sang Penari required two years of research to better present the historical context, including the 30 September Movement and ensuing anti-communist actions; these details, censored in the original trilogy by the New Order government, were more explicit than in the novels. Although the film was set and shot in Purwokerto, Central Java, neither of the leads was ethnic Javanese. Nasution, cast in her debut role, is Batak, while Antara is Balinese.

Upon its release on 10 November 2011, Sang Penari was critically praised. Tohari called it a "sublime adaptation of his work", while Labodalih Sembiring of the Jakarta Globe described its socio-cultural elements as worthy of a Shakespearean tragedy. At the 2011 Indonesian Film Festival, Sang Penari won four awards, including Best Picture, out of nine nominations.

== Plot ==
In 1953, two tempeh bongkrèk makers in Dukuh Paruk, a small hamlet in Banyumas, Central Java, accidentally sell poisoned tempeh, which kills many residents, including the much respected ronggeng (local traditional dancer). The residents of the hamlet begin panicking and rioting, accusing the tempeh makers of plotting against the village; in response, the tempeh makers eat their own produce, resulting in their deaths. Their daughter, Srintil, survives and is raised by her grandfather Sakarya (Landung Simatupang).

Ten years later in 1963, Srintil (Prisia Nasution) and Rasus (Nyoman Oka Antara) are fast friends. Rasus also has romantic feelings for her. With the hamlet starved and in a depression since the loss of its ronggeng, Sakarya receives a vision that Srintil will become a great ronggeng, capable of saving the hamlet from starvation. He then convinces Srintil to become a ronggeng. She then tries to proves herself to Kartareja (Slamet Rahardjo), the hamlet's ronggeng caretaker and his wife (Dewi Irawan) by dancing at the grave of Ki Secamenggala, the hamlet's founder. Her attempt is only successful after Rasus gave her the ronggeng amulet belonged to the late ronggeng of Dukuh Paruk. Seeing this amulet, Kartareja then announces that Srintil has been chosen by the founder's spirit. Meanwhile, Indonesian Communist Party member Bakar (Lukman Sardi) arrived in the hamlet and began convincing local farmers to join the party, claiming that the Communist party are the only ones who can help save the wong cilik (underclass) of Dukuh Paruk and their starving hamlet.

After the success of her dance at the grave of Ki Secamenggala, Srintil is told that she must undergo a ritual before she can truly become a ronggeng, called bukak klambu (literally "opening the veil"), in which her virginity will be sold to the highest bidder. This upsets Rasus, who tells Srintil that he is not comfortable with her becoming a ronggeng. Srintil says that she will give her virginity to Rasus, and on the day of the bukak klambu they have sex in a goat shack; that evening, Srintil has sex with two other "highest bidders" and becomes a full ronggeng.

Devastated, Rasus runs away from the hamlet, leaving Srintil broken-hearted. He then joins a local army base, where he befriends Sergeant Binsar (Tio Pakusadewo). Binsar teaches him to read and wins Rasus' trust. Meanwhile, the residents of Dukuh Paruk start to embrace communism under Bakar's leadership, despite their lack of political knowledge. During Rasus' military time, Dukuh Paruk's ronggeng troupe, which includes Kartareja, Sakarya, Sakum the blind kendhang player, and Srintil becomes increasingly popular and become involved in many rally events organised by the communist party.

Two years later, following the failed Communist-led coup d'état in Jakarta. Rasus is sent by Binsar in operations to clear the presence of Communists in the area. However, when Dukuh Paruk's turn comes in the massacre, Rasus hurries back, leaving his army comrades to his hamlet to find and save Srintil. He finds Dukuh Paruk to be destroyed and devoid of its inhabitants, leaving only Sakum. His continued effort ends in vain as Rasus arrives in a hidden army concentration camp just as Srintil is taken away by the army and disappears along with the rest of Dukuh Paruk's residents.

Ten years later, Rasus meets a street dancer and a blind man in a village close to Dukuh Paruk who resemble Srintil and Sakum. He quickly stops her, giving her the amulet of Dukuh Paruk's ronggeng which he found in Dukuh Paruk during his search for Srintil ten years ago. The dancer nervously accepts it and leave Rasus, who smiles, signalling his recognition of his love Srintil.

== Cast ==
- Prisia Nasution as Srintil
- Nyoman Oka Antara as Rasus
- Slamet Rahardjo as Kartareja
- Lukman Sardi as Bakar
- Tio Pakusadewo as Sergeant Binsar

== Production ==
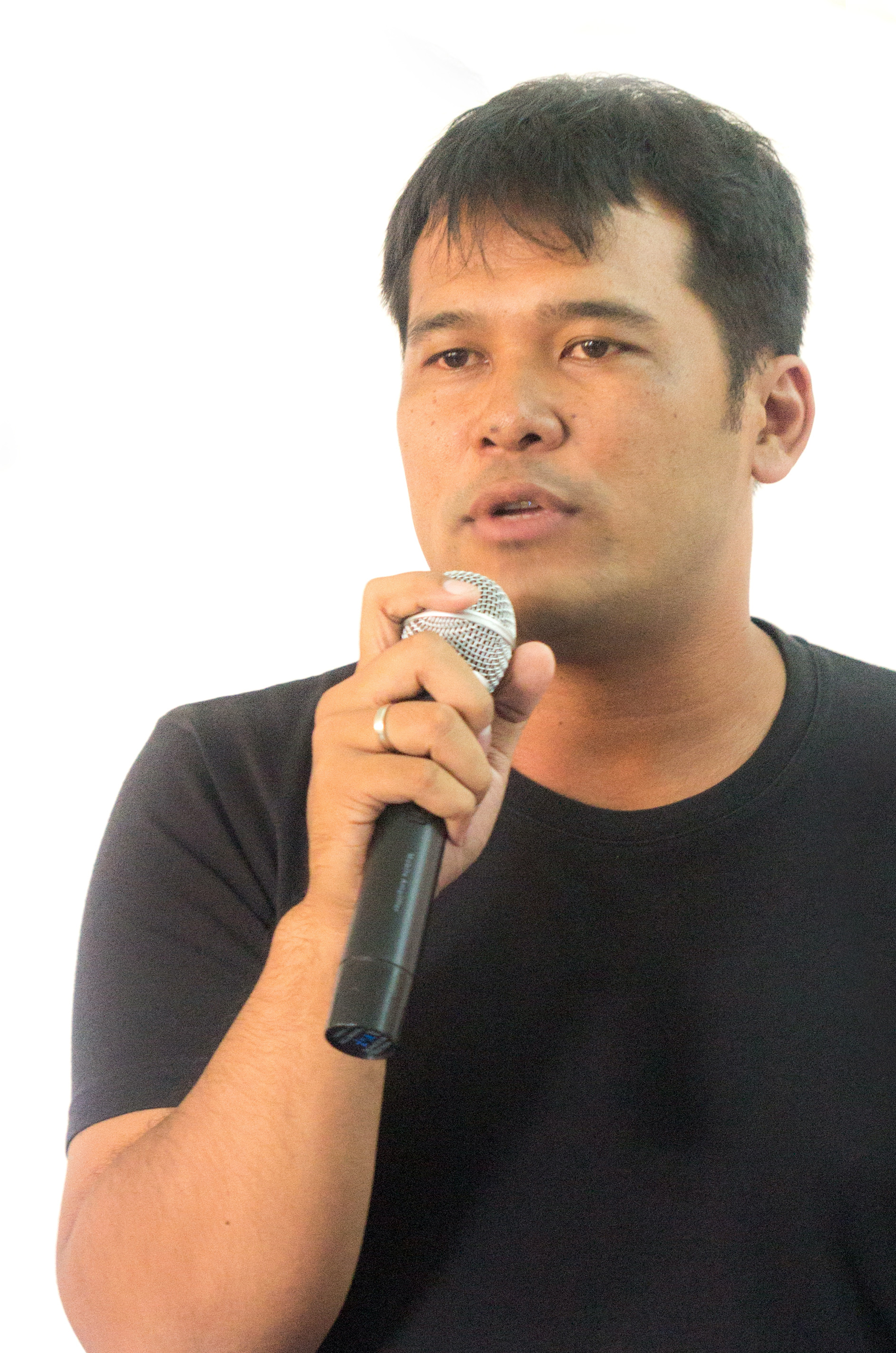
Ifa Isfansyah (pictured in 2018) directed Sang Penari

Sang Penari was directed by Ifa Isfansyah. Husband and wife team Wong Aksan and Titi Sjuman were chosen to do the scoring, which they spent a month and a half on; they later said that work on the film brought them closer together. Shanty Harmayn, who had previously worked on Pasir Berbisik (Whispering Sands; 2004), was chosen to produce, while Salman Aristo, known for his scripts for Ayat-Ayat Cinta (Verses of Love; 2008) and Laskar Pelangi (Rainbow Warriors; 2009) spearheaded the writing. The screenplay went through twelve drafts and took two years of research.

Sang Penari is based on the Ronggeng Dukuh Paruk (Ronggeng of Paruk Hamlet) by Ahmad Tohari; it is the second adaptation of the work, after Darah dan Mahkota Ronggeng (Blood and Crown of a Dancer), directed by Yazman Yazid and starring Ray Sahetapy and Enny Beatrice, in 1983. The film was shot mostly in Banyumas, Central Java. Director Ifa Isfansyah attempted to cast the lead role of Srintil there, but failed after several months looking.

Isfansyah eventually chose a new actress, Prisia Nasution. Balinese actor Nyoman Oka Antara, who had previously played in Ayat-Ayat Cinta (Verses of Love; 2008) and Perempuan Berkalung Sorban (The Girl With the Keffiyeh Around Her Neck; 2009), was cast in the leading male role. The film also featured Slamet Rahardjo, Dewi Irawan, Hendro Djarot, Tio Pakusadewo, Lukman Sardi, and Teuku Rifnu Wikana in supporting roles; Happy Salma also had a cameo as a dancer.

== Style and themes ==
Sang Penari touches on the history of communism in Indonesia, focusing on the nation's communist party spreading its ideology and the government's purge of the Communist Party's members from 1965 to 1966, which is thought to have killed several hundred thousand. It is only the third Indonesian film to cover the killings, following Arifin C. Noer's G30S/PKI (1984) and Riri Riza's Gie (2005). Tohari later said that if he had written about the killings as they were depicted in the film, the repressive New Order government would have had him shot.

Sang Penari features many spoken lines in the Banyumasan language spoken in the area. It also features several aspects of Indonesian culture, including batik and Javanese music.

== Release and reception ==
Sang Penari was released on 10 November 2011. Tohari, who had refused to watch the first adaptation, enjoyed Sang Penari and reportedly considered it a "sublime adaptation of his work". Triwik Kurniasari, writing for The Jakarta Post, described the film as "artistically stunning" and that Isfansyah "smoothly translates the sinister moment and the vicious attempts taken by the military in handling possible traitors". Labodalih Sembiring, writing for the Jakarta Globe, said the socio-cultural elements in the film were worthy of a Shakespearean tragedy and that it featured good acting and direction; however, the film's soundtrack was considered lacking.

== Awards ==
Sang Penari was nominated for nine awards at the 2011 Indonesian Film Festival, winning four. The film was selected as the Indonesian entry for the Best Foreign Language Oscar at the 85th Academy Awards, but it did not make the final shortlist.

Award	Year	Category	Recipient	Result
Indonesian Film Festival	2011	Best Picture		Won
Indonesian Film Festival	2011	Best Director	Ifa Isfansyah	Won
Indonesian Film Festival	2011	Best Screenplay	Salman Aristo, Ifa Isfansyah, and Shanty Harmayn	Nominated
Indonesian Film Festival	2011	Best Cinematography	Yadi Sugandi	Nominated
Indonesian Film Festival	2011	Best Artistic Direction	Eros Eflin	Nominated
Indonesian Film Festival	2011	Best Leading Actor	Nyoman Oka Antara	Nominated
Indonesian Film Festival	2011	Best Leading Actress	Prisia Nasution	Won
Indonesian Film Festival	2011	Best Supporting Actor	Hendro Djarot	Nominated
Indonesian Film Festival	2011	Best Supporting Actress	Dewi Irawan	Won
Academy Award	2012	Best Foreign Language Film		Submitted

== See also ==
- List of submissions to the 85th Academy Awards for Best Foreign Language Film
- List of Indonesian submissions for the Academy Award for Best Foreign Language Film
