= Lukman Sardi =

Indonesian actor of Javanese descent (born 1971)

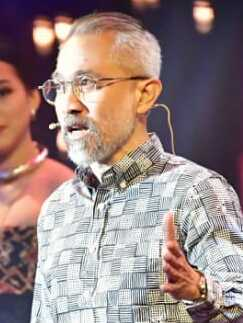
- Sardi at 2019 FFI
- Born: 14 July 1971 (age 55); Jakarta, Indonesia
- Occupation: Celebrity
- Years active: 1977 - present
- Spouse: Pricillia Pullunggono (m. 2009)
- Father: Idris Sardi
- Relatives: Mas Sardi (grandfather); Hadidjah (grandmother)

Lukman Sardi (born 14 July 1971) is an Indonesian actor of Javanese-Bugis descent. He is the son of Indonesian violinist Idris Sardi and a grandson of Indonesian actress, Hadidjah.

== Early life and career ==
Lukman Sardi was born on 14 July 1971, in Jakarta, Indonesia. Lukman is a son of the legend violinist musician Idris Sardi and is a grandchild of Mas Sardi. Sardi began his career as an actor when he played in the 1980s film, Anak-Anak Tak Beribu. Previously, Sardi had starred in some films, like Kembang-Kembang Plastik and Pengemis dan Tukang Becak, although only for minor roles.

== Personal life ==
In December 2009, Sardi married Pricillia Pullunggono, who is 13 years younger than he is. After being married for 6 years, Sardi has three sons: Akiva Dishan Ranu Sardi, Akira Deshawn Yi Obelom Sardi, and Akino Dashan Kaimana Sardi.

In June 2015, Sardi started a controversy regarding his conversion from Islam to Christianity. This rumor had occurred when Sardi be to be a testimony in the anniversary events of Indonesian Bethel Church Ecclesia, which was uploaded in YouTube on 24 May 2015. Sardi admits that changing religion is not a compulsion but a call from the heart. It is revealed by him on 30 March 2022 that his conversion was because of spiritual discontentment he experienced during his trip during umrah that led him to convert his religion.

== Filmography ==
=== Film ===
Year	Title	Role	Notes
1979	Cubit - Cubitan	Lukman	Supporting Role
1980	Anak-Anak Tak Beribu	Memet	Supporting role
1980	Gema Hati Bernyanyi		Supporting role
2005	Janji Joni	Joni's dad	Cameo
2005	Gie	Herman Lantang	Nominated – 2005 Indonesian Film Festival for Best Supporting Actor
2006	9 Naga	Marwan	Nominated – 2006 MTV Indonesia Movie Awards for Most Favorite Actor; Won – 2006 Festival Film Bandung for Best Male Leading Role
2006	Berbagi Suami	Mr. Lik	Supporting role
2006	Jakarta Undercover	Haryo	Lead role
2006	Pesan Dari Surga	Kuta	Supporting role
2007	Nagabonar Jadi 2	Umar	Won – 2007 Festival Film Bandung for Best Male Supporting Role; Won – 2007 Indonesian Film Festival for Best Supporting Actor; Nominated – 2008 Indonesian Movie Awards for Best Supporting Actor; Nominated – 2007 Jakarta Film Festival for Choice Supporting Role Actor
2007	Suster N	Surya Wijaya	Supporting role
2007	The Photograph	Suroso	Supporting role
2007	Quickie Express	Piktor	Supporting role
2008	Kawin Kontrak	Kang Sono	Nominated – 2008 Indonesian Film Festival for Best Supporting Actor
2008	In the Name of Love	Aryan Hidayat	Supporting role
2008	May	Gandang	Supporting role
2008	Laskar Pelangi	Adult Ikal	Supporting role
2008	Kawin Kontrak Lagi	Kang Sono	Lead role Won – 2009 Indonesian Movie Awards for Best Supporting Actor; Nominated – 2009 Indonesian Movie Awards for Favorite Supporting Actor
2008	Pencarian Terakhir	Tito	Lead role Nominated – 2009 Indonesian Movie Awards for Favorite Actor; Nominated – 2009 Indonesian Movie Awards for Best Actor
2008	Takut: Faces of Fear	Bayu	Segment: "Show Unit"
2008	Lastri	Unknown Role	
2009	Merah Putih	Amir	Lead role
2009	Heart-Break.com	The Masseur	Supporting role
2009	Sang Pemimpi	Adult Ikal	Supporting role
2010	Tanah Air Beta	Lukman	Supporting role
2010	Red Cobex	Yopie	Lead role Nominated – 2010 Indonesian Film Festival for Best Leading Actor
2010	Darah Garuda	Amir	Lead role
2010	Sang Pencerah	Ahmad Dahlan	Won – 2011 Festival Film Bandung for Best Male Leading Role
2010	Aku atau Dia	Mr. Suma	Supporting role
2010	Jakarta Maghrib	Unknown Role	
2011	Serdadu Kumbang	Mr. Alim	Supporting role
2011	Pengejar Angin	Mr. Damar	Supporting role
2011	Hati Merdeka	Amir	Lead role
2011	Sang Penari	Bakar	Supporting role
2011	Semesta Mendukung	Muslat	Supporting role
2012	Dilema	Andry	Segment: "The Gambler"
2012	Hattrick	Mr. Toro	Supporting role
2012	Di Timur Matahari	Samuel	Lead role
2012	Cinta di Saku Celana	Bagas	Supporting role
2012	Brandal-Brandal Ciliwung	Unknown Role	Supporting role
2012	Rumah di Seribu Ombak	Aminullah	Nominated – 2012 Indonesian Film Festival for Best Supporting Actor
2013	Sang Pialang	Lukman	Supporting role
2013	Kisah 3 Titik	Agus	Supporting role
2013	Rectoverso	Abang	Segment: "Malaikat Juga Tahu"; Won – 2013 Indonesian Movie Awards for Best Actor; Won – 2013 Indonesian Movie Awards for Best Chemistry (with Dewi Irawan); Nominated – Indonesian Film Festival 2013 for Best Leading Actor; Nominated – 2013 Indonesian Movie Awards for Favorite Actor; Won – 2013 Maya Awards for Best Actor in an Omnibus
2013	Leher Angsa	Mr. Tampan	Lead role
2013	Soekarno	Hatta	Supporting role Won – 2014 Indonesian Movie Awards for Best Supporting Actor; Nominated – 2014 Maya Awards for Best Actor in a Supporting Role
2013	Laskar Pelangi 2: Edensor	Ikal	Lead role
2013	Cinta Dalam Kardus		
2014	Princess, Bajak Laut dan Alien	Unknown Role	Supporting role
2014	Aku Cinta Kamu	Unknown Role	
2014	Negeri Tanpa Telinga	Ustad Etawa	Supporting role Nominated – 2014 Maya Awards for Arifin C Noer (Non Effectively Brief Appearance)
2014	7/24	Prasetyo Ichsan Setiawan	Lead role Won – 2015 Indonesian Movie Awards for Best Chemistry (with Dian Sastrowardoyo)
2015	Cinta Selamanya		
2015	Gangster	Mat Killer	
2015	Jenderal Soedirman	Yusuf Ronodipuro	
2016	The Professionals	Corko	
2017	Moammar Emka's Jakarta Undercover	Djarwo	
2017	Night Bus		
2017	Sweet 20	Aditya	
2017	Surat Kecil untuk Tuhan	Uncle Rudi	
2017	Jailangkung	Ferdi	
2019	Gundala	Ridwan Bahri	
2019	Susi Susanti: Love All	MF Siregar	
2019	Abracadabra	Lindu	
2019	Orang Kaya Baru	Bapak	
2020	The East	Bakar	
2021	Photocopier	Sur's father	
2021	Paranoia	Gion	
2022	Autobiography	Soewito	
2024	Till Death Do Us Part	Priest	
2024	Borderless Fog	Panca Nugraha	
2024	All We Need Is Time	Restu Kurniawan	
2025	Lost in the Spotlight	Lukman Sarbi	

=== Television ===
Year	Title	Role	Network
1994	Enam Langkah		
2000	Cinta Yang Kumau		
2000	Kawin Lari		
2020	The Bridge (Season 2)	Commander Bayu Soemarsono	Viu/HBO Asia
2023	Blood Curse	Ahmad Kusumawijaya	Disney+ Hotstar

=== Director ===
Year	Title	Role	Notes
2009	Sang Penjahit	Director	Short film
2015	Di Balik 98	Director	Won – 2016 Indonesian Box Office Movie Awards for Best Director

== Awards and nominations ==
Year	Awards	Category	Recipients	Results
2005	Indonesian Film Festival	Citra Award for Best Supporting Actor	Gie	Nominated
2006	Bali International Film Festival	The Best Actor	Lukman Sardi	Won
2006	MTV Indonesia Movie Awards	Most Favorite Actor	9 Naga	Nominated
2006	Bandung Film Festival	Best Male Leading Role	9 Naga	Won
2007	Bandung Film Festival	Best Male Supporting Role	Nagabonar Jadi 2	Won
2007	Indonesian Film Festival	Citra Award for Best Supporting Actor	Nagabonar Jadi 2	Won
2007	Jakarta Film Festival	Choice Supporting Role Actor	Nagabonar Jadi 2	Nominated
2007	Indonesian Movie Awards	Best Supporting Actor	Gie	Nominated
2007	Indonesian Movie Awards	Favorite Supporting Actor	Gie	Nominated
2008	Indonesian Movie Awards	Best Supporting Actor	Nagabonar Jadi 2	Nominated
2008	Indonesian Film Festival	Best Supporting Actor	Kawin Kontrak	Nominated
2009	Dahsyatnya Awards	Outstanding Video Clip Model	"Malaikat Juga Tahu" (performed by Dewi Lestari)	Won
2009	Indonesian Movie Awards	Best Actor	Pencarian Terakhir	Nominated
2009	Indonesian Movie Awards	Favorite Actor	Pencarian Terakhir	Nominated
2009	Indonesian Movie Awards	Best Supporting Actor	Kawin Kontrak Lagi	Won
2009	Indonesian Movie Awards	Favorite Supporting Actor	Kawin Kontrak Lagi	Nominated
2010	Indonesian Film Festival	Citra Award for Best Leading Actor	Red CobeX	Nominated
2011	Bandung Film Festival	Best Male Leading Role	Sang Pencerah	Won
2011	Indonesian Movie Awards	Best Actor	Sang Pencerah	Nominated
2011	Indonesian Movie Awards	Favorite Actor	Sang Pencerah	Nominated
2011	Indonesian Movie Awards	Best Actor	Darah Garuda	Nominated
2011	Indonesian Movie Awards	Favorite Actor	Darah Garuda	Nominated
2011	Dahsyatnya Awards	Outstanding Video Clip Model	"Tuhan Maha Cinta" (performed by Nidji)	Won
2012	Indonesian Film Festival	Citra Award for Best Supporting Actor	Rumah di Seribu Ombak	Nominated
2013	Indonesian Film Festival	Citra Award for Best Leading Actor	Rectoverso	Nominated
2013	Maya Awards	Best Actor in an Omnibus	Rectoverso	Won
2013	Indonesian Movie Awards	Best Actor	Rectoverso	Won
2013	Indonesian Movie Awards	Favorite Actor	Rectoverso	Nominated
2013	Indonesian Movie Awards	Best Chemistry (with Dewi Irawan)	Rectoverso	Won
2014	Indonesian Movie Awards	Best Supporting Actor	Soekarno	Won
2014	Maya Awards	Best Actor in a Supporting Role	Soekarno	Nominated
2014	Maya Awards	Arifin C Noer (Non Effectively Brief Appearance)	Negeri Tanpa Telinga	Nominated
2014	Indonesian Choice Awards	Actor of the Year	Lukman Sardi	Nominated
2015	Showbiz Indonesia Awards	Movie Director of the Year	Lukman Sardi	Won
2015	Indonesian Movie Awards	Best Chemistry	7/24 (with Dian Sastrowardoyo)	Won
2016	Indonesian Box Office Movie Awards	Best Director	Di Balik 98	Won
