= 2013 Maya Awards =

Annual Indonesian film awards ceremony

2nd Annual Maya Awards
- Date: December 21, 2013
- Location: Umaniara De'Brawijaya, Kebayoran Baru, South Jakarta
- Country: Indonesia
- Most awards: Habibie & Ainun (4)
- Most nominations: Rectoverso (12)

The 2nd Annual Maya Awards (Indonesian: Piala Maya 2013) was an award ceremony honoring the best in Indonesian films of 2013. The ceremony was held in Hotel Umaniara De'Brawijaya, Kebayoran Baru, South Jakarta, on December 21, 2013.

== Awards ==
The number of awards being given increased from the previous year to 29 competitive categories with 3 special awards. The following categories were not present previously:

- Best Original Screenplay (previously Best Screenplay)
- Best Adapted Screenplay (previously Best Screenplay)
- Best New Actor (previously Best New Performer)
- Best New Actress (previously Best New Performer)
- Best Segment in an Omnibus (previously Best Omnibus Film)

== Winners and nominees ==
Winners are listed first and signified in bold letters.

=== Best Feature Film ===
- The Jungle School
  - 9 Summers 10 Autumns
  - Belenggu
  - Finding Srimulat
  - Hari Ini Pasti Menang
  - Habibie & Ainun
  - Laura & Marsha
  - Noah: Awal Semula
  - Something in the Way
  - What They Don't Talk About When They Talk About Love

=== Best Director ===
- Mouly Surya (What They Don't Talk About When They Talk About Love)
  - Dinna Jasanti (Laura & Marsha)
  - Ifa Isfansyah (9 Summers 10 Autumns)
  - Riri Riza (The Jungle School)
  - Upi Avianto (Belenggu)

=== Best Actor in a Leading Role ===
- Reza Rahadian (Habibie & Ainun)
  - Abimana Aryasatya (Belenggu)
  - Ikranagara (Sang Kiai)
  - Joe Taslim (La Tahzan)
  - Vino G. Bastian (Rumah dan Musim Hujan)

=== Best Actress in a Leading Role ===
- Julia Perez (Gending Sriwijaya)
  - Adinia Wirasti (Laura & Marsha)
  - Prisia Nasution (The Jungle School)
  - Ratu Felisha (Something in the Way)
  - Ririn Ekawati (Kisah 3 Titik)

=== Best Actor in a Supporting Role ===
- Alex Komang (9 Summers 10 Autumns)
  - Agus Kuncoro (Gending Sriwijaya)
  - Didi Petet (Madre)
  - Landung Simatupang (Rumah dan Musim Hujan)
  - Mathias Muchus (Hari Ini Pasti Menang)

=== Best Actress in a Supporting Role ===
- Ayushita (What They Don't Talk About When They Talk About Love)
  - Christine Hakim (Sang Kiai)
  - Dewi Irawan (9 Summers 10 Autumns)
  - Imelda Therinne (Belenggu)
  - Jajang C. Noer (Ruman dan Musim Hujan)

=== Best Young Performer ===
- Jefan Nathanio (Tampan Tailor)
  - Bintang Panglima (Leher Angsa)
  - Coboy Junior (Coboy Junior: The Movie)
  - Nyungsang Bungo (The Jungle School)
  - Shafil Hamdi Nawara (9 Summers 10 Autumns)

=== Best New Actor ===
- Reza Nangin (Cinta tapi Beda)
  - Anggun Priambodo (What They Don't Talk About When They Talk About Love)
  - Natalius Chendana (3Sum)
  - Ronny P. Tjandra (3Sum)
  - Zhendy Zain (Hari Ini Pasti Menang)

=== Best New Actress ===
- Lina Marpaung/Mak Gondut (Demi Ucok)
  - Christy Mahanani (Vakansi yang Janggal dan Penyakit Lainnya)
  - Karina Salim (What They Don't Talk About When They Talk About Love)
  - Maryam Supraba (Kisah 3 Titik)
  - Geraldine Sianturi (Demi Ucok)

=== Best Original Screenplay ===
- Swastika Nohara (Hari Ini Pasti Menang)
  - Mouly Surya (What They Don't Talk About When They Talk About Love)
  - Sammaria Simajuntak (Demi Ucok)
  - Teddy Soeriaatmadja (Something in the Way)
  - Upi Avianto (Belenggu)

=== Best Adapted Screenplay ===
- Ifa Isfansyah, Iwan Setyawan, Fajar Nugros (9 Summers 10 Autumns)
  - Donny Dhirgantoro, Hilman Mutasi, Sunil Soraya (5 cm)
  - Gina S. Noer & Ifan Adriansyah Ismail (Habibie & Ainun)
  - Riri Riza (The Jungle School)
  - Ve Handojo, Key Mangunsong, Indra Herlambang, Ilya Sigma, Priesnanda Dwisatria (Rectoverso)

=== Best Cinematography ===
- Yunus Pasolang (What They Don't Talk About When They Talk About Love)
  - Ipung Rahmat Syaiful (Habibie & Ainun)
  - Roy Lolang (Laura & Marsha)
  - Yudi Datau (5 cm)
  - Yadi Sugandi (Rectoverso)

=== Best Costume Design ===
- Retno R. Damayanti (Habibie & Ainun)
  - Andhika Dharmapermana (Belenggu)
  - Gemailia Gea Geriantiana (Sang Kiai)
  - Liza Masitha, Khairiyyah Sari, Auguste Soesastro (9 Summers 10 Autumns)
  - Retno R. Damayanti (Gending Sriwijaya)

=== Best Makeup & Hairstyling ===
- Retno R. Damayanti, Joy Revfa, Rezani Ramli (Habibie & Ainun)
  - Danny Boris Saragi & Sarwo Edi Kocom (Sang Kiai)
  - Jerry Oktavianus (9 Summers 10 Autumns)
  - Kumalasari (Belenggu)
  - Retno R. Damayanti (Gending Sriwijaya)

=== Best Sound Design ===
- Khikmawan Santosa (Hari Ini Pasti Menang)
  - Khikmawan Santosa (Belenggu)
  - Satrio Budiono (Gending Sriwijaya)
  - Satrio Budiono (The Jungle School)
  - Khikmawan Santosa (What They Don't Talk About When They Talk About Love)

=== Best Art Direction ===
- Iqbal Marjono (Belenggu)
  - Aek Bewava (Legend of Trio Macan)
  - Ario Anindito (Finding Srimulat)
  - Frans X. R. Paat (Sang Kiai)
  - Rico Marpaung (Cinta dalam Kardus)

=== Best Film Score ===
- Indra Lesmana (Adriana)
  - Aghi Narottama & Bemby Gusti (Laura & Marsha)
  - Aksan Sjuman (The Jungle School)
  - Ananda Sukarlan (Hari Ini Pasti Menang)
  - Ricky Lionardi (Rectoverso)
  - Tya Subiakto (Habibie & Ainun)
  - Yovial Tri Purnomo Viegie (Sagarmatha)
  - Zeke Khaselli & Yudi Arfani (What They Don't Talk About When They Talk About Love)

=== Best Editing ===
- Cesa David Lukmansyah, Aline Jusria, Faesal Rizal (Noah: Awal Semula)
  - Aline Jusria (Laura & Marsha)
  - Cesa David Lukmansyah & Ryan Purwoko (Rectoverso)
  - Sastha Sunu (5 cm)
  - Wawan I. Wibowo (Belenggu)

=== Best Special Effects ===
- Adam Howarth (Sang Kiai)
  - Andi Manoppo (Belenggu)
  - Cindy Suryadji (Gending Sriwijaya)
  - Eltra Studio (Moga Bunda Disayang Allah)
  - Mahadhika Caesar, Rivai Chen, Revi M. (Hari Ini Pasti Menang)

=== Best Poster Design ===
- Gamaliel Budiharga (Vakansi yang Janggal dan Penyakit Lainnya)
  - Coboy Junior: The Movie
  - Laura & Marsha
  - Rectoverso
  - Refrain

=== Best Theme Song ===
- "Cinta Sejati" composed by Melly Goeslaw, performed by Bunga Citra Lestari (Habibie & Ainun)
  - "Bernyanyi Untukmu" composed and performed by Andien (Pintu Harmonika)
  - "Cinta dalam Kardus" composed and performed by Endah N Rhesa (Cinta dalam Kardus)
  - "Di Atas Awan" composed and performed by Nidji (5 cm)
  - "Firasat" composed by Dewi Lestari, performed by Raisa (Rectoverso)
  - "Lenggang Puspita" composed by Guruh Soekarnoputra, remixed by Winky Wiryawan (Finding Srimulat)
  - "Summertime" composed and performed by Diar (Laura & Marsha)

=== Best Documentary ===
- 400 Words (Ismail Basbeth)
  - Canggung (Tunggul Banjaransari)
  - Di Balik Frekuensi (Ucu Agustin)
  - Dongeng Sebuah Batik (Onny Pahlevi)
  - Mangga Golek Matang di Pohon (Tonny Trimarsanto)
  - Nasionalisme dalam Onggokan Piringan Hitam (Andika Widyantoro)
  - Rock in Solo (Edmond Waworuntu)
  - Orang Rimba yang Tak Punya Hutan (Primaha Genta S.)

=== Best Short Film ===
- Dino (Edward Gunawan)
  - Dilarang Menyontek (M. Ihsan Fadli)
  - Halaman Belakang (Yusuf Radjamuda)
  - Hanacaraka (Yasin Hidayat)
  - Kamis Ke-300 (Happy Salma)
  - Langka Receh (Eka S. & Miftakhatun)
  - Lawuh Boled (Misyatun)
  - Mulih (Fajar Martha Santosa)
  - Pohon Penghujan (Andra Fembrianto)
  - Umbul (Himawan Pratista)

=== Best Short Animated Film ===
- Sang Supporter (Wiryadi Darmawan)
  - Booster (Eko Junianto)
  - Dance On (Rama York)
  - Moriendo (Andrey Pratama)
  - Petualangan Banyu dan Elektra Menyalakan Kota (Greeneration, Komunitas Sahabat Kota, WWF)

=== Best Segment in an Omnibus ===
- "Malaikat Juga Tahu" (Rectoverso; directed by Marcella Zalianty)
  - "Curhat buat Sahabat" (Rectoverso; directed by Olga Lidya)
  - "Otot" (Pintu Harmonika; directed by Ilya Sigma)
  - "Rawa Kucing" (3Sum; directed by Andri Cung)
  - "With or Without" (Wanita Tetap Wanita; directed by Reza Rahadian)

=== Best Actor in an Omnibus ===
- Lukman Sardi (Rectoverso; Malaikat Juga Tahu segment)
  - Barry Prima (Pintu Harmonika; Skors segment)
  - Donny Damara (Pintu Harmonika; Otot segment)
  - Indra Birowo (Rectoverso; Curhat buat Sahabat segment)
  - Winky Wiryawan (3Sum; Insomnights segment)

=== Best Actress in an Omnibus ===
- Dewi Irawan (Rectoverso; Malaikat Juga Tahu segment)
  - Acha Septriasa (Rectoverso; Curhat buat Sahabat segment)
  - Aline Adita (3Sum; Rawa Kucing segment)
  - Jenny Zhang (Pintu Harmonika; Piano segment)
  - Karina Salim (Pintu Harmonika; Otot segment)

=== Best Regional Film ===
- Nagasari (Christopher Hanno & Eduardus Pradipto, West Java)
  - Marginal (M. Riedho Pratama, North Sumatra)
  - Negeri di Bawah Awan (Ipong Wijaya, Papua)

=== Best Film Review ===
- Imam Santoso, for "Protes dari Orang Rimba" (The Jungle School)
  - A. Humaidy, for "Cinta Klasik dengan Intrik yang Tak Menarik" (Cinta tapi Beda)
  - Elbert Reyner, for "Definisi Cinta yang Konkret" (Rectoverso)
  - Fuad Misbah, for "Cinta dan Aturan Leluhur" (Mursala)
  - Theresia Agustina, for "Habibie & Ainun" (Habibie & Ainun)

== Special awards ==
- Non-narrative Documentary Feature: Febian Nurrahman Saktinegara (Epic Java).
- Most Promising Young Director: Misyatun (Lawuh Boled).
- Best DVD Release: Catatan Harian Si Boy.

== Multiple wins and nominations ==
The following films received multiple awards:

Film	Wins
Habibie & Ainun	4
Rectoverso; What They Don't Talk About When They Talk About Love	3
9 Summers 10 Autumns; Hari Ini Pasti Menang	2

The following films receive multiple nominations:

Film	Nominations
Rectoverso	12
Belenggu	11
What They Don't Talk About When They Talk About Love	9
9 Summers 10 Autumns; Habibie & Ainun; Laura & Marsha	8
Hari Ini Pasti Menang; The Jungle School	7
Gending Sriwijaya; Pintu Harmonika; Sang Kiai	6
3Sum	5
5 cm	4
Demi Ucok; Finding Srimulat; Something in the Way	3
Cinta dalam Kardus; Coboy Junior: The Movie; Kisah 3 Titik; Noah: Awal Semula; Vakansi yang Janggal dan Penyakit Lainnya	2
