= Street Society =

- Poster
- Directed by: Awi Suryadi
- Written by: Khalid Khasogi; Agasyah Karim
- Produced by: Eryck Wowor; Irwan Santoso
- Starring: Marcel Chandrawinata; Chelsea Islan
- Cinematography: Roby Herbi
- Edited by: Yoga Krispratama; Jazzie C. Arisca Agoest
- Music by: Aghi Narottama; Winky Wiryawan & Evan Virgan
- Distributed by: Ewis Pictures
- Release date: February 20, 2014
- Country: Indonesia
- Languages: Indonesian; Betawinese; Javanese; Balinese; English
- Budget: Rp18 Billion Rupiah

Street Society is a 2014 Indonesian auto action film starring Marcel Chandrawinata and Chelsea Islan. It was distributed by Ewis Pictures and directed by Awi Suryadi.

== Plot ==
Cocky, charismatic, and womanizing Rio (Marcel Chandrawinata) is the reigning champion of Indonesia's illegal street-racing scene. With his friends—tuning genius Monty (Daniel Topan), Balinese champion racer Gde (Yogie Tan), and the beautiful yet brash Nanda (Kelly Tandiono)—Rio forms a speed-obsessed society that races fellow supercar owners in exotic locations across the country. His archenemy is Nico (Edward Gunawan), the heavily guarded heir to a Surabaya crime syndicate and the city's No. 1 racer. After Rio humiliates Nico on his home turf, Nico repeatedly challenges him to a rematch.

Rio's priorities change after he meets the beautiful and intellectual Karina (Chelsea Islan), an up-and-coming DJ who performs at one of his regular hangouts. Their friendship develops into a relationship, and Rio begins to focus on something other than racing. After a race ends in a near-fatal incident that shocks Karina, Rio decides to leave racing behind.

His retirement is disrupted by the arrival of the nervous racer Yopie (Edward Akbar), who harbours a violent hatred of Nico. Yopie and his family blame Nico for the death of their father, a notorious mobster in the late 1990s. Seeking revenge, Yopie plans to defeat Nico in a road race, the only setting in which Nico is not protected by his bodyguards. He forces Rio to race Nico one final time, threatening Karina if Rio refuses.

== Cast ==
=== Stars ===
- Marcel Chandrawinata as Rio
- Chelsea Islan as Karina

=== Supporting cast ===
- Edward Gunawan as Nico
- Edward Akbar as Yopie
- Daniel Topan as Monty
- Yogie Tan as Gde
- Kelly Tandiono as Nanda
- Ferry Salim as Frankie
- Moudy Milinka as Aline
- Dimas Argobie as Bram
- Marcellino Lefrandt as Marco
- Wulan Guritno as Aisha
- Avrilla Sigarlaki as Key

=== Cameos ===
- Senk Lottaas The Next Girl
- Leroy Osmani
- Billy W. Polii
- Roro Fitria

== Soundtrack and score ==
=== Album ===
Original Motion Picture Soundtrack - Street Society

=== Single ===
- "Secepat Kilat" by Nidji
- "Faster Than Light" by Edward Akbar/CrazyED
- "Am with You" by Ape on the Roof

=== Score ===
- "Street Society" by Dj Winky Wiryawan & Dj Evan Virgan
- "Rio & Nico" by Aghi Narottama
- "The Team" by Aghi Narottama
- "The Suramadu Race" by Aghi Narottama
- "2am Beats" by Aghi Narottama
- "Monty's Mirrage of Figaro" by Aghi Narottama
- "The Night Is Young" by Aghi Narottama
