= Aisyah: Biarkan Kami Bersaudara =

- Directed by: Herwin Novianto
- Produced by: Film One Productions
- Starring: Laudya Cynthia Bella, Lidya Kandau, Arie Kriting, Ge Pamungkas
- Release date: May 2016
- Country: Indonesia
- Language: Indonesian

Aisyah: Biarkan Kami Bersaudara (English: Aisyah, Let Us be a family) is a 2016 Indonesian film produced by Film One Productions and directed by Herwin Novianto. The film is about a Muslim woman who becomes a teacher at a Catholic village. The shooting location was Atambua, East Nusa Tenggara. The film starred Laudya Cynthia Bella, Lidya Kandau, Arie Kriting, and Ge Pamungkas. The film was premiered on mid-May 2016.
