= Ifa Isfansyah =

Indonesian film director (born 1979)

- Isfansyah in 2026
- Born: 1979 (age 46–47); Yogyakarta, Indonesia
- Education: Indonesian Institute of the Arts, Yogyakarta
- Occupation: Film director
- Years active: 2001 – present
- Notable work: Garuda di Dadaku; Sang Penari
- Spouse: Kamila Andini
- Awards: 1 Citra Award

Ifa Isfansyah (born Yogyakarta, 1979) is an Indonesian film director. Initially a maker of short films, his first featured film, Garuda di Dadaku (Garuda on my Chest), was released in 2009. His following film, Sang Penari (The Dancer), won four Citra Awards at the 2011 Indonesian Film Festival.

== Biography ==
Ifa was born in Yogyakarta in 1979. He grew up in a small village and enjoyed soccer in his youth; first playing with a Muhammadiyah-sponsored team, he was a reserve in junior high school. After high school, where he dabbled in basketball and playing the bass, he enrolled at the Indonesian Institute of the Arts.

In 2001, Ifa founded the independent film community Fourcolors Films; the following year, he released his first short film, Air Mata Surga (Heaven's Tears), together with Eddie Cahyono. Mayar, also released in 2002, which was shown in several film festivals, including the International Film Festival Rotterdam.

Four years later, Ifa released Harap Tenang, Ada Ujian! (Please Be Quiet, There are Tests!), a short film about the 2006 FIFA World Cup in comparison with the 2006 Yogyakarta earthquake, which was screened in film festivals in Indonesia, Japan, and Kazakhstan. The same year, he received a scholarship to study film at Im Kwon Taek Film School in Dongseo University, South Korea. In 2007 he released Setengah Sendok Teh (Half a Teaspoonful).

Ifa made his feature film debut with Garuda di Dadaku (Garuda on my Chest), which was released on 18 June 2009; the film follows a young boy who dreams of playing in the Indonesian football league.

On 10 November 2011, Ifa released his second feature-length film, Sang Penari (The Dancer), which had spent three years in production. Based on the trilogy Ronggeng Dukuh Paruk (Ronggeng of Paruk Hamlet) by Ahmad Tohari, the film follows the life of a young ronggeng in Banyumas, Central Java, and touches on the communist purge of 1965–1966. The film was selected as the Indonesian entry for the Best Foreign Language Oscar at the 85th Academy Awards, but it did not make the final shortlist.

== Awards ==
Ifa's film Sang Penari garnered four Citra Awards at the 2011 Indonesian Film Festival, including Best Picture and Best Director.

== Personal life ==
Ifa is married to fellow director Kamila Andini, the daughter of director Garin Nugroho.

== Filmography ==
As of 2018, Ifa has been involved in 21 film productions (both theatrical and short) as director, producer, and/or screenwriter.

- Harap Tenang, Ada Ujian! (2006), as director and screenwriter
- Setengah Sendok Teh (2007), as director and screenwriter
- Huan Chen Guang (2008), as producer, director, and screenwriter
- 9808 Antologi 10 Tahun Reformasi Indonesia (2008), as producer, director, and screenwriter
- Garuda di Dadaku (2009), as director
- Belkibolang (2010), as director
- Sang Penari (2011), as director and screenwriter
- Cewek Saweran (2011), as screenwriter
- Rindu Purnama (2011), as screenwriter
- Rumah dan Musim Hujan (2012), as producer, director, and screenwriter
- Ambilkan Bulan (2012), as director
- 9 Summers 10 Autumns (2013), as director and screenwriter
- Isyarat (2013), as producer
- Masked Monkey - The Evolution of Darwin's Theory (2014), as co-producer
- Pendekar Tongkat Emas (2014), as director and screenwriter
- Siti (2014), as producer and executive producer
- Pesantren Impian (2016), as director
- Catatan Dodol Calon Dokter (2016), as director
- Turah (2016), as producer
- The Seen and Unseen (2017), co-producer
- Hoax (2018), as producer, director, and screenwriter
- Memories of My Body (2018), as producer
- Mountain Song (2019), as producer
- Abracadabra (2019), as producer
- Yuni (2021), as producer
- Losmen Bu Broto (2021), as director
- Before, Now & Then (2022), as producer
- Four Seasons in Java (2026), as producer
