= Soekarno (film) =

- Theatrical poster of the film
- Directed by: Hanung Bramantyo
- Written by: Ben Sihombing
- Produced by: Raam Punjabi
- Starring: Ario Bayu; Lukman Sardi; Maudy Koesnaedi; Matias Muchus; Sujiwo Tejo; Tika Bravani; Ferry Salim; Emir Mahira; Agus Kuncoro
- Cinematography: Faozan Rizal
- Production companies: Dapur Film; MVP Pictures
- Distributed by: MVP Pictures
- Release date: 11 December 2013
- Running time: 137 minutes
- Country: Indonesia
- Languages: Indonesian (Dutch is present and is subtitled to Indonesian)

Soekarno (Indonesian: Soekarno: Indonesia Merdeka — "Indonesia's Independence") is a 2013 Indonesian biographical film directed by Hanung Bramantyo and written by Ben Sihombing. This film tells the story of the life of the late Sukarno, the first president of Indonesia. Sukarno, who was born with the name "Kusno", was one of the major figures who played an important part in the fight for Indonesia's independence from Dutch colonial rule. This film stars Ario Bayu as Sukarno.

On 13 December 2013, the Central Jakarta Business Management Court (PTUN) acceded to an injunction made by one of Sukarno's daughters, Rachmawati Soekarnoputri, to halt the film's release. Some film critics had criticised the film for being too commercialised and taking liberties in its depiction of historical events and characters. Subsequently however, on 7 January 2014, the PTUN decided to overturn its earlier decision and allow the film to be shown.

The film was selected as Indonesia's entry for the Best Foreign Language Film at the 87th Academy Awards, but was not nominated.

== Plot ==
Soekarno is based on the life of Sukarno, and covers the period from his childhood until his historic Proclamation of Indonesian Independence in 1945. In 1931, the Dutch East Indies government in Java arrests Sukarno, an aspiring young nationalist who wants to free Indonesia from Dutch colonial rule. He is then placed in Banceuy Prison in Bandung. Sukarno finds a way to fight back by delivering his famous defense oration "Indonesia Accuses!" (Indonesia Menggugat) in his trial at Bandung Laandraad Courthouse.

== Cast ==
- Ario Bayu - "Soekarno"
- Lukman Sardi - Hatta
- Mathias Muchus - Hassan Din
- Henky Solaiman - Koh Ah Tjun
- Ria Irawan - Prostitute
- Emir Mahira - "Soekarno" (Teen)
- Aji Santosa - "Soekarno" (Kid)
- Tika Bravani - Fatmawati
- Sujiwo Tejo - Soekemi
- Michael Tju - Emperor Hirohito
- Ferry Salim - Sakaguchi
- Widi Dwinanda - Ratna Djoeami
- Agus Kuncoro - Gatot Mangkuprojo
- Timo Scheunemann - Letkol Hoogeband
- Maudy Kusnaedi - Inggit Garnasih
- Tanta Ginting - Sjahrir
- Norman Rivianto Akyuwen - Dr. Waworuntu
- Stefanus Wahyu - Sayuti Melik
- Elang - Kartosuwiryo
- Agus Mahesa - Ki Hadjar Dewantara
- Hamid Salad - Achmad Soebardjo
- Noel Kevas - Dr. Radjiman Wediodiningrat
- Budiman Sudjatmiko - Suyudi
- Theo - Oto Iskandar di Nata
- Nelly Sukma - Kartika
- Husni - Sujatmoko
- Muhammad Abbe - Wikana
- Fajar - Kyai Zaenal Mustofa
- Uchida - Nishijima
- Susumu - Hitoshi Imamura
- Roza - HOS Tjokroaminoto
- Diel Sriyadi - Asmara Hadi
- Ade Firman Hakim - Chaerul Saleh
- Alex - Latief Hendraningrat
- Patton Otlivio Latupeirissa - Riwu
- Toyik - Ki Bagus Hadikusumo
- Anto Galon - Musso
- Argo - Sukarni
- Kedung - Subadio
- Anta - Kyai Wahid Hasyim
- Rully Kertaredjasa - Fatmawati's Mother
- Ganesh - Maskoen
- Helmy Nonaka - Nakayama
- Mia - Mien Hessel
- Suzuki - Admiral Tadashi Maeda
- Ayu Laksmi - "Soekarno's" Mother
- Moch. Achir - Dr. Soeharto
- Keio Pamudji - Kumakichi Harada

== Production ==
In September 2013, Sukarno's daughter, Rachmawati Soekarnoputri, said that she had felt betrayed by the production studio MVP Pictures and resisted the release of the movie production in its current form. She wanted actor Anjasmara to play Sukarno in the film, but the director, Hanung Bramantyo, stuck to his choice of Ario Bayu. However, Rachmawati felt that Ario did not meet her expectations in his portrayal of her father. She had also complained that she was not permitted to give directions or provide feedback on Ario's presentation and interpretation of the gestures and mannerisms of the lead character, something she felt was necessary for him to better portray her father. On 23 September 2013, the dispute came to a head with Rachmawati reporting Hanung Bramantyo to the police on allegations of defamation. At the same time, Hanung publicly stated that he believed Rachmawati's motive for the public dispute with him was purely to seek publicity and popularity for herself. The movie's release went ahead despite the dispute. On his part, the director believed that the movie was historically accurate. "I will continue to screen Sokarno because there is nothing wrong with the movie," he said in September 2013. He said that Rachmawati only had the right to give her advice but not to make any actual decisions concerning the film itself. He also said that matters concerning the making of a film were the sole prerogative of the director.

== See also ==
- List of submissions to the 87th Academy Awards for Best Foreign Language Film
- List of Indonesian submissions for the Academy Award for Best Foreign Language Film
