= Maya Awards (Indonesia) =

Annual film award from the FILM_Indonesia Twitter account

Piala Maya
- Awarded for: Honoring best in Indonesian films
- Country: Indonesia
- First award: 2012
- Website: Official Website

Maya Awards (Indonesian: Piala Maya) is an annual Indonesian film awards initiated in 2012 by Indonesian online film enthusiasts who were active on Twitter.

The first annual Maya Awards was held on December 15, 2012 in Jakarta. It has been cited by local media outlets as the "Indonesian Golden Globe" with the annual Citra Awards of Indonesian Film Festival being the Indonesian equivalent of Academy Awards.

The nominations and winners of the awards are selected by a panel of judges consisting of Indonesian film critics and filmmakers, including directors, actors, and actresses. The festival was founded by local film critic Hafiz Husni.

== Categories ==
- Best Feature Film
- Best Director
- Best Actor in a Leading Role
- Best Actress in a Leading Role
- Best Actor in a Supporting Role
- Best Actress in a Supporting Role
- Best Young Performer
- Best New Performer (2012)
  - Best New Actor (since 2013)
  - Best New Actress (since 2013)
- Best Screenplay (2012)
  - Best Original Screenplay (since 2013)
  - Best Adapted Screenplay (since 2013)
- Best Cinematography
- Best Costume Design
- Best Makeup & Hairstyling
- Best Sound Design
- Best Art Direction
- Best Film Score
- Best Editing
- Best Special Effects
- Best Poster Design
- Best Theme Song
- Best Documentary
- Best Short Film
- Best Short Animated Film
- Best Omnibus Film (2012)
- Best Segment in an Omnibus (2013-present)
  - Best Actor in an Omnibus
  - Best Actress in an Omnibus
- Best Regional Film
- Best Film Critic

== Ceremonies ==
Ceremony	Date	Best Film	Most Wins	Most Nominations	Most Nominations without Winning Any
1st Annual Maya Awards	December 15, 2012	Lovely Man	Lovely Man (4)	The Raid: Redemption (10)	Rayya, Cahaya di Atas Cahaya (6)
2nd Annual Maya Awards	December 21, 2013	The Jungle School	Habibie & Ainun (4)	Rectoverso (12)	Laura & Marsha (8)
3rd Annual Maya Awards	December 20, 2014	Lights from the East: I Am Maluku	Lights from the East: I Am Maluku (5)	3 Nafas Likas (16)	The Sinking of the van der Wijck (11)
4th Annual Maya Awards	December 19, 2015	Guru Bangsa: Tjokroaminoto	Guru Bangsa: Tjokroaminoto (8)	Guru Bangsa: Tjokroaminoto (14)	The Golden Cane Warrior (11)
5th Annual Maya Awards	December 18, 2016	Aisyah: Let Us be a family	Athirah (6)	Athirah (14)	Warkop DKI Reborn: Jangkrik Boss! Part 1 (6)
6th Annual Maya Awards	December 16, 2017	Marlina the Murderer in Four Acts	Marlina the Murderer in Four Acts (5)	Marlina the Murderer in Four Acts (12)	My Generation (6)
7th Annual Maya Awards	January 19, 2019	Cemara's Family	Cemara's Family (6)	212 Warrior (14)	Aruna & Her Palate (8)
8th Annual Maya Awards	February 8, 2020	Two Blue Stripes	Two Blue Stripes (4)	This Earth of Mankind (12)	Habibie & Ainun 3 (5)
9th Annual Maya Awards	March 6-7, 2021	Mecca I'm Coming	Mecca I'm Coming (5)	Abracadabra; Mecca I'm Coming (12)	A Million Love (5)
10th Annual Maya Awards	March 24–26, 2022	Yuni	Yuni (7)	Vengeance Is Mine, All Others Pay Cash (18)	
11th Annual Maya Awards	April 19, 2023	Missing Home	Missing Home (5)	Before, Now & Then, Like & Share, Qodrat, and Stealing Raden Saleh (11)	
