= 2022 Maya Awards =

2022 Indonesian film awards

11th Maya Awards
- Awarded for: The achievement in Indonesian cinema
- Presented on: 19 April 2023

Highlights
- Best Picture: Missing Home
- Most awards: Missing Home (5)
- Most nominations: Before, Now & Then, Like & Share, Qodrat, and Stealing Raden Saleh (11)

The 11th Maya Awards took place on 19 April 2023 to honor the achievement in Indonesian cinema released in 2022.

Drama film Missing Home won the most awards with five, including Best Feature Film. Other winners included Before, Now & Then with three, and The Big 4, Miracle in Cell No. 7, Photocopier, Satan's Slaves 2: Communion, and Srimulat: Hil yang Mustahal with two.

== Winners and nominees ==
The nominations were announced on 12 April 2023 on the award's social media. Before, Now & Then, Like & Share, Qodrat, and Stealing Raden Saleh received the most nominations with eleven.

=== Awards ===
Winners are listed first, highlighted in boldface, and indicated with a double dagger (‡).

**Best Feature Film**: **Missing Home – Dipa Andika**‡; Before, Now & Then – Ifa Isfansyah and Gita Fara; Like & Share – Chand Parwez Servia and Gina S. Noer; Photocopier – Adi Ekatama and Ajish Dibyo; Qodrat – Linda Gozali Arya; The Red Point of Marriage – Gope T. Samtani; Satan's Slaves 2: Communion – Tia Hasibuan and Gope T. Samtani; Stealing Raden Saleh – Cristian Imanuell
**Best Director**: **Bene Dion Rajagukguk – Missing Home**‡; Angga Dwimas Sasongko – Stealing Raden Saleh; Gina S. Noer – Like & Share; Kamila Andini – Before, Now & Then; Sabrina Rochelle Kalangie – The Red Point of Marriage	**Iqbal Rais Award for Best Directorial Debut Feature**: **Wregas Bhanuteja – Photocopier**‡; Muhadkly Acho – Gara-Gara Warisan; Randolph Zaini – Preman: Silent Fury; Ruben Adrian – Spirited; Umay Shahab – Kukira Kau Rumah
**Best Actor in a Leading Role**: **Vino G. Bastian – Miracle in Cell No. 7 as Dodo Rozak**‡; Abimana Aryasatya – The Big 4 as Topan; Arswendy Bening Swara – Missing Home as Pak Domu; Bio One – Srimulat: Hil yang Mustahal as Gepeng; Oka Antara – The Red Point of Marriage as Gilang Priambodo	**Best Actress in a Leading Role**: **Shenina Cinnamon – Photocopier as Suryani**‡; Aurora Ribero – Like & Share as Lisa; Happy Salma – Before, Now & Then as Raden Nana Sunani; Marsha Timothy – The Red Point of Marriage as Ambarwati; Tika Panggabean – Missing Home as Mak Domu
**Best Actor in a Supporting Role**: **Elang El Gibran – Srimulat: Hil yang Mustahal as Basuki**‡; Arswendy Bening Swara – Before, Now & Then as Mr. Darga; Iwa K – Broken Wings as Leong; Jerome Kurnia – Photocopier as Tariq; Umay Shahab – Stealing Raden Saleh as Gofar	**Best Actress in a Supporting Role**: **Laura Basuki – Before, Now & Then as Ino**‡; Aulia Sarah – Like & Share as Fita; Gita Bhebita – Missing Home as Sarma E. Purba; Lutesha – The Big 4 as Alpha; Sheila Dara Aisha – The Red Point of Marriage as Yulinar
**Arifin C. Noer Award for Best Brief Memorable Performance**: **Kiki Narendra – Satan's Slaves 2: Communion as Ustadz Mahmud**‡; Ayu Azhari – The Red Point of Marriage as Kartika; Lolox, Dicky Difie, Ence Bagus, and Aci Resti – Gara-Gara Warisan as Ijul, Umar, Aceng and Wiwin; Poppy Sovia – Keramat 2: Caruban Larang as Poppy; Rita Matu Mona – Missing Home as Ompung Domu	**Best Young Performer**: **Graciela Abigail – Miracle in Cell No. 7 as young Ika Kartika Rozak**‡; Jaden Ocean – The Red Point of Marriage as Bagas; Keanu Azka Briansyah – Qodrat as Alif Amri; Muzakki Ramdhan – The Wheel of Life as Yahya; Widuri Puteri – Cemara's Family 2 as Cemara
**Best Breakthrough Actor**: **Kristo Immanuel – The Big 4 as Pelor**‡; Hiroaki Katō – Ivanna as Matsuya; Keanu Angelo – Keramat 2: Caruban Larang as Keanu; Reza Hilman – Ben & Jody as Jago; Samudra Taylor – Argantara as Andre Galaksa	**Tuti Indra Malaon Award for Best Breakthrough Actress**: **Maudy Effrosina – Qodrat as Asha**‡; Arla Ailani – Keramat 2: Caruban Larang as Arla; Michelle Tahalea – The Big 4 as Alo; Zee JKT48 – Tainted Soul as Dini / Windy; Ziva Magnolya – Pulang as Rindu
**Best Original Screenplay**: **Missing Home – Bene Dion Rajagukguk**‡; Like & Share – Gina S. Noer; Photocopier – Wregas Bhanuteja; Qodrat – Gea Rexy, Asaf Antariksa, and Charles Gozali; Stealing Raden Saleh – Angga Dwimas Sasongko and Husein M. Atmodjo	**Best Adapted Screenplay**: **The Red Point of Marriage – Titien Wattimena and Sabrina Rochelle Kalangie; based on the 1996 soap opera by Buce Malawau**‡; Before, Now & Then – Kamila Andini and Ahda Imran; based on the novel Jais Darga Namaku by Imran; Check the Store Next Door 2 – Ernest Prakasa and Meira Anastasia; based on the characters from the film Check the Store Next Door by Prakasa, Jenny Jusuf, and Anastasia; Miracle in Cell No. 7 – Alim Sudio; based on the original motion picture screenplay of the same name written by Lee Hwan-kyung, Yu Young-a, Kim Hwang-sung, and Kim Young-seok; Satan's Slaves 2: Communion – Joko Anwar; based on the characters from the film Satan's Slaves by Anwar
**Best Cinematography**: **Before, Now & Then – Batara Goempar**‡; Like & Share – Deska Binarso; Qodrat – Hani Pradigya; Satan's Slaves 2: Communion – Ical Tanjung; Stealing Raden Saleh – Bagoes Tresna Aji	**Best Art Direction**: **Before, Now & Then – Vida Sylvia**‡; Like & Share – Dita Gambiro; Qodrat – Frans XR Paat; Satan's Slaves 2: Communion – Allan Sebastian; Stealing Raden Saleh – Yusuf Kaisuku
**Best Editing**: **Missing Home – Aline Jusria**‡; The Big 4 – Dinda Amanda; Like & Share – Aline Jusria; Qodrat – Teguh Raharjo; Stealing Raden Saleh – Hendra Adhi Susanto	**Best Visual Effects**: **The Big 4 – Mattebox Studio**‡; Qodrat – Gaga Nugraha Ramadhan; Satan's Slaves 2: Communion – Abby Eldipie; Sri Asih – Kalvin Irawan; Stealing Raden Saleh – Afterlab
**Best Costume Design**: **Sri Asih – Meutia S. Pudjowarsito**‡; Before, Now & Then – Retno Ratih Damayanti; Like & Share – Dara Asvia; Srimulat: Hil yang Mustahal – Angela Suri Nasution; Stealing Raden Saleh – Marcello Hizky	**Best Make-Up & Hair**: **Srimulat: Hil yang Mustahal – Jerry Octavianus**‡; Before, Now & Then – Eba Sheba; Qodrat – Astrid Sambudiono and Gunawan Saragih; Satan's Slaves 2: Communion – Darwyn Tse; Sri Asih – Aktris Handradjasa
**Best Sound**: **Satan's Slaves 2: Communion – Mohamad Ikhsan and Anhar Moha**‡; The Big 4 – Hiro Ishizaka and M. Ichsan Rachmaditta; Like & Share – Aria Prayogi, Muhammad Akbar Patawari, and M. Ichsan Rachmaditta; Qodrat – Aria Prayogi, Ridho Fachri, and M. Ichsan Rachmaditta; Stealing Raden Saleh – Satrio Budiono and Aufa R. Triangga Ariaputra	**Best Score**: **Stealing Raden Saleh – Abel Huray**‡; Before, Now & Then – Ricky Lionardi; Missing Home – Viky Sianipar; The Red Point of Marriage – Ifa Fachir and Dimas Wibisana; Satan's Slaves 2: Communion – Aghi Narottama, Bemby Gusti, and Tony Merle
**Best Theme Song**: **"Huta Namartuai" from Missing Home – Written and Performed by Viky Sianipar**‡; "Andaikan Kau Datang" from Miracle in Cell No. 7 – Written by Tonny Koeswoyo; Performed by Andmesh; "Kukira Kau Rumah" from Kukira Kau Rumah – Written by Isamaula Elfasya and Andari Jamalina Pratami; Performed by Amigdala; "Noktah Merah Perkawinan" from The Red Point of Marriage – Written by Areng Widodo, Ifa Fachir, and Dimas Wibisana; Performed by Isabel Azhari; "Terjanji" from Check the Store Next Door 2 – Written and Performed by Mikha Angelo	**Best Poster Design**: **Like & Share – Alvin Hariz**‡; KKN di Desa Penari – Puja Mulani; Qodrat (teaser poster) – Caravan Studio; Satan's Slaves 2: Communion (IMAX and international version) – Alvin Hariz; Sri Asih (solo version) – Champ & Pepper
**Best Short Film**: **Bersama Membangun Negeri – Deo Mahameru**‡; Arjuna (The Backstage Story) – Jihad Adjie; Berdoa, Mulai! – Tanzilal Azizie; Bukan Anak Meriam – Nehemia Pareang; Dan Bahagia – Kurnia Alexander; Lansia Lan Sopo – M. Alfian Alfarisi; Maybe Someday, Another Day, But Not Today – Bihar Jafarian; Sesaat Sebelum Terucap – Anisa Berliana	**Best Animated Short Film**: **Serangan Oemoem – Fajar Martha Santosa**‡; Cake Day! – Ribka Natalia; Labirin Lembusora – Gugun Arief; Nusa Antara – Firman Widyasmara and Azalia Muchransyah; Outside My Little World – Alifio Farras
**Best Documentary Feature Film**: **The Tone of Wheels – Yuda Kurniawan**‡; Atas Nama Daun – Mahatma Putra; Blueprint: Making of Mencuri Raden Saleh – Bobby Zarkasih; Mena Musik Amboina – Linda Ochy; Nisan Tak Terukir – Abdul Ghaniy Rosyidin	**Best Documentary Short Film**: **Romansa Di Balik Pagar Akal – Rifqi Asha**‡; Bebenjangan – Belva Atsil Rismayandi; Kemarin Semua Baik-Baik Saja (A Letter to the Future) – Kurnia Yudha F.; Ludruk Dahulu, Kini dan Nanti – Reni Apriliana; Memutar Limbah Peradaban – Andi Hutagalung
**Best Music Video**: **"Dunia Tipu-Tipu" by Yura Yunita – Gianni Fajri**‡; "Hati-Hati di Jalan" by Tulus – Davy Linggar; "Khayalan Tingkat Tinggi" by Noah – Upie Guava; "Kisah Sempurna" by Mahalini – Bobby Adrian Vitra and Jessy Sylviani; "Lestari Merdu" by Afgan – Shadtoto Prasetio; "Mesra-Mesraannya Kecil-Kecilan Dulu" by Sal Priadi – Aco Tenriyagelli; "Sang Dewi" by Lyodra and Andi Rianto – Upie Guava; "Tutur Batin" by Yura Yunita – Gianni Fajri

=== Films with multiple nominations and awards ===
Films that received multiple nominations
Nominations	Film
11	Before, Now & Then
11	Like & Share
11	Qodrat
11	Stealing Raden Saleh
10	Missing Home
10	The Red Point of Marriage
10	Satan's Slaves 2: Communion
7	The Big 4
5	Photocopier
4	Miracle in Cell No. 7
4	Srimulat: Hil yang Mustahal
3	Keramat 2: Caruban Larang
2	Check the Store Next Door 2
2	Gara-Gara Warisan
2	Kukira Kau Rumah

Films that received multiple awards
Awards	Film
5	Missing Home
3	Before, Now & Then
2	The Big 4
2	Miracle in Cell No. 7
2	Photocopier
2	Satan's Slaves 2: Communion
2	Srimulat: Hil yang Mustahal
