= 2013 Indonesian Film Festival =

2013 Indonesian film awards

33rd Indonesian Film Festival
- Date: 7 December 2013
- Site: Marina Convention Center, Semarang, Central Java, Indonesia
- Hosted by: Andhika Pratama; Gading Marten; Nirina Zubir

Highlights
- Best Picture: The Clerics
- Most awards: The Clerics (4)
- Most nominations: Shackled (13)

The 33rd Indonesian Film Festival ceremony took place on 7 December 2013 at the Marina Convention Center, Semarang, Central Java, Indonesia, to honor the achievement in Indonesian cinema of 2013. It was broadcast on SCTV and presented by actors Andhika Pratama, Gading Marten, and Nirina Zubir.

Biographical drama film The Clerics won the most awards with four, including Best Picture. Other winners included Habibie & Ainun with three and Shackled with two.

== Winners and nominations ==
The nominations were announced on 22 November 2013 at the Gedung Film, South Jakarta. Psychological horror film Shackled led the nominations with thirteen, followed by road movie Laura & Marsha with eleven and biographical drama film The Clerics with eight.

Winners are listed first, highlighted in boldface, and indicated with a double dagger (‡).

**Best Picture**: **The Clerics – Gope T. Samtani**‡; 5 cm – Sunil Soraya; Habibie & Ainun – Dhamoo Punjabi and Manoj Punjabi; Laura & Marsha – Leni Lolang; Shackled – H. B. Naveen and Frederica	**Best Director**: **Rako Prijanto – The Clerics**‡; Dinna Jasanti – Laura & Marsha; Hanung Bramantyo and Hestu Saputra – Cinta tapi Beda; Rizal Mantovani – 5 cm; Upi Avianto – Shackled
**Best Actor**: **Reza Rahadian – Habibie & Ainun as B. J. Habibie**‡; Abimana Aryasatya – Shackled as Elang; Ikranagara – The Clerics as Hasyim Asy'ari; Joe Taslim – La Tahzan as Yamada; Lukman Sardi – Rectoverso as Abang	**Best Actress**: **Adinia Wirasti – Laura & Marsha as Marsha**‡; Happy Salma – Air Mata Terakhir Bunda as Srijani; Imelda Therinne – Shackled as Jingga; Laudya Cynthia Bella – Shackled as Djenar; Laura Basuki – Madre as Mei Lan Tanuwidjaja
**Best Supporting Actor**: **Adipati Dolken – The Clerics as Harun**‡; Alex Komang – 9 Summers 10 Autumns as Hassyim; Didi Petet – Madre as Hadi; Igor Saykoji – 5 cm as Ian; Norman Akyuwen – Tak Sempurna as Professor	**Best Supporting Actress**: **Jajang C. Noer – Cinta Tapi Beda as Diana's mother**‡; Ayushita – What They Don't Talk About When They Talk About Love as Fitri; Dewi Irawan – Rectoverso as Mama; Meriza Febriani – The Clerics as Sari; Poppy Sovia – Merry Go Round as drug dealer
**Best Screenplay**: **Habibie & Ainun – Gina S. Noer and Ifan A. Ismail**‡; Air Mata Terakhir Bunda – Danial Rifki and Endri Pelita; Cinta Tapi Beda – Novia Faizal, Perdana Kertawiyudha, and Tetty Apriliyana; Laura & Marsha – Titien Wattimena; Shackled – Upi Avianto	**Best Story**: **Sang Pialang – Anggoto Saronto and Titien Wattimena**‡; Cinta Tapi Beda – Hestu Saputra and Hanung Bramantyo; Laura & Marsha – Dinna Jasanti and Leni Lolang; Shackled – Upi Avianto; What They Don't Talk About When They Talk About Love – Mouly Surya
**Best Documentary Feature**: **Denok dan Gareng – Dwi Susanti Nugraheni**‡; Batak: Perjalanan Ke Tanah Leluhur – Mahatma Putra and Tassja May; Jejak Nusantara – Yoga Nugraha; Mangga Golek Matang di Pohon - Tonny Trimarsanto; Superglad Rock Together – Kamerad Edmond	**Best Documentary Short Film**: **Split Mind – Nia Sari**‡; Dongeng Sebuah Batik – Ony Wahyu Pahlevi; The Man Come Around – Adi Saputra; Manisnya Garam – Eryawan Sri Martono; Pahare – Juwita Sari
**Best Live Action Short Film**: **Simanggale – Donny Harlan**‡; Dino – Edward Gunawan; Gazebo – Tseno Aji Julius; Pohon Penghujan – Andra Fembrianto; Tikus – Chusnul Khitam	**Best Animated Short Film**: **Sang Suporter – W. Dharmawan**‡; Florist – M. Paji Sobiulah; Hebring & Bagol – Mar Lan Sugama and Dennis Adhiswara; Inspektur Johnny – Mohamad Fajar; Keripik Sukun Mbok Darmi – Heri Kurniawan
**Best Cinematography**: **5 cm – Yudi Datau**‡; Habibie & Ainun – Ipung Rachmat Syaiful; Laura & Marsha – Roy Lolang; Madre – Fachmi J. Saad; Shackled – Ical Tanjung	**Best Film Editing**: **Rectoverso – Cesa David Luckmansyah and Ryan Purwoko**‡; Get M4rried – Cesa David Luckmansyah, Ryan Purwoko, and Oliver Sitompul; Habibie & Ainun – Wawan I. Wibowo; Laura & Marsha – Aline Jusria; Shackled – Wawan I. Wibowo
**Best Original Score**: **Shackled – Aksan Sjuman**‡; Bidadari-Bidadari Surga – Tya Subiakto; The Clerics – Aghi Narottama; Kisah 3 Titik – Thoersi Argeswara; Laura & Marsha – Aghi Narottama and Bemby Gusti	**Best Sound**: **The Clerics – Khikmawan Santosa, M. Ikhsan Sungkar, and Yusuf A. Pattawari**‡; Habibie & Ainun – Khikmawan Santosa; Laura & Marsha – Aufa R. Triangga Ariaputra and Khikmawan Santosa; Sang Pialang – Adityawan Susanto; Shackled – Khikmawan Santosa
**Best Visual Effects**: **Moga Bunda Disayang Allah – Eltra Studio**‡; Gending Sriwijaya – Cyndi Suryadi; The Legend of Trio Macan – Galih Mahardhika	**Best Art Direction**: **Shackled – Iqbal Rayya Rante**‡; 5 cm – Vida Sylvia; Air Mata Terakhir Bunda – Mai Harison; The Clerics – Frans X. R. Paat; Laura & Marsha – Eros Eflin
**Best Costume Design**: **Habibie & Ainun – Retno Ratih Damayanti**‡; Air Terjun Pengantin Phuket – Aldi Harra; Laura & Marsha – Darwyn Tse; Sang Pialang – Aldi Harra and Upay; Shackled – Andhika Dharmapermana

=== Films with multiple nominations and awards ===
Films that received multiple nominations
Nominations	Film
13	Shackled
11	Laura & Marsha
8	The Clerics
7	Habibie & Ainun
5	5 cm
4	Cinta Tapi Beda
3	Air Mata Terakhir Bunda
3	Madre
3	Rectoverso
3	Sang Pialang
2	What They Don't Talk About When They Talk About Love

Films that received multiple awards
Awards	Film
4	The Clerics
3	Habibie & Ainun
2	Shackled
