= List of awards and nominations received by Vino G. Bastian =

Vino G. Bastian awards and nominations
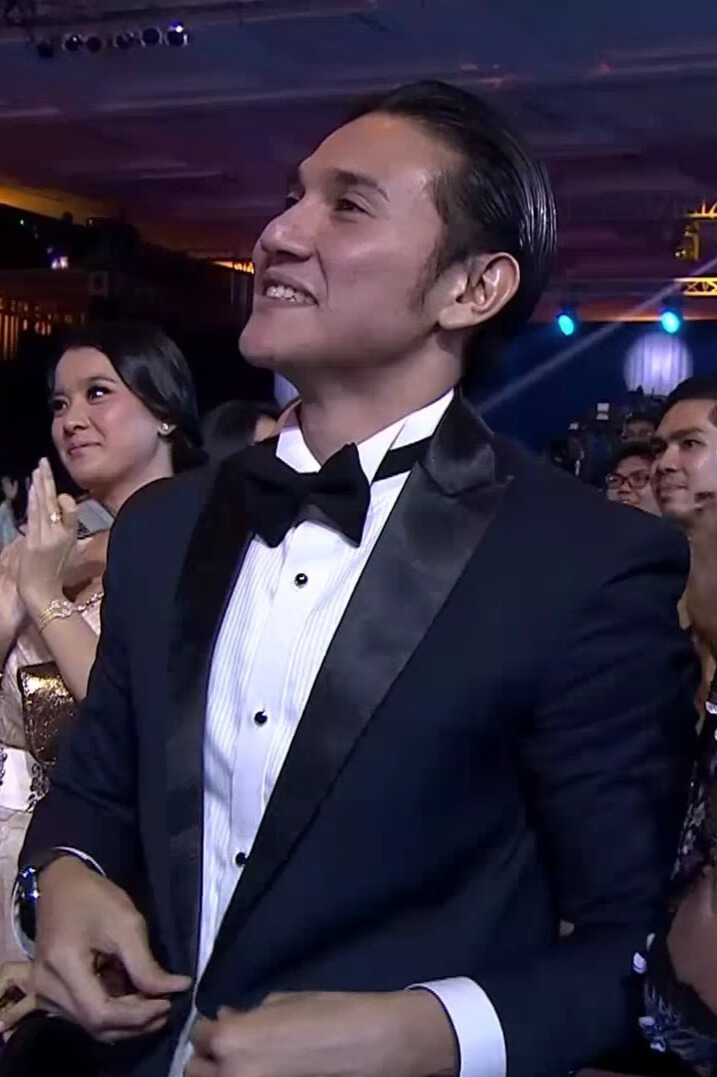
- Bastian at the 2015 Indonesian Film Festival
Awards and nominations
Award	Wins	Nominations
Bandung Film Festival	2	7
Indonesian Film Festival	1	7
Indonesian Journalists Film Festival	2	3
Indonesian Box Office Movie Awards	0	2
Indonesian Choice Awards	2	5
Indonesian Movie Actors Awards	5	12
MTV Indonesia Movie Awards	1	4
Maya Awards	1	6
Panasonic Gobel Awards	0	2

Totals (Note: Certain award groups do not simply award one winner. They acknowledge several different recipients, have runners-up, and have third place. Since this is a specific recognition and is different from losing an award, runner-up mentions are considered wins in this award tally. For simplification and to avoid errors, each award in this list has been presumed to have had a prior nomination.)
- Wins: 14
- Nominations: 48

Vino G. Bastian is an Indonesian movie star, and soap opera actor. He started his career as a drummer and model.

He has received many award nominations during his career, including by Bandung Film Festival, Indonesian Film Festival, Maya Awards, as well as several other awards.

In 2008, he won the Citra Award as "Best Actor" and won the Indonesian Movie Awards as "Favorite Actor", Best Couple, and Favorite Couple (with Fahrani) for his role as Radit in Radit and Jani.

== Bandung Film Festival ==
Year	Category	Nominated Work	Result
2008	Commendable Leading Movie Actor	Radit dan Jani	Nominated
2010	Commendable Leading Movie Actor	Serigala Terakhir	Nominated
2013	Commendable Leading Movie Actor	Madre	Nominated
2014	Commendable Television Actor	Hanya Tuhanlah yang Tahu	Won
2015	Commendable Leading Movie Actor	Toba Dreams	Won
2018	Commendable Leading Movie Actor	Chrisye	Nominated
2021	Commendable Leading Movie Actor	Sabar Ini Ujian	Nominated

== Indonesian Film Festival ==
Year	Category	Nominated work	Result
2008	Best Actor	Radit dan Jani	Won
2009	Best Actor	Serigala Terakhir	Nominated
2014	Best Actor	3 Nafas Likas	Nominated
2015	Best Actor	Toba Dreams	Nominated
2016	Best Actor	Warkop DKI Reborn: Jangkrik Boss! Part 1	Nominated
2018	Best Actor	Chrisye	Nominated
2022	Best Actor	Miracle in Cell No. 7	Nominated

== Indonesian Journalists Film Festival ==
Year	Category	Nominated work	Result
2021	Best Actor – Comedy	Sabar Ini Ujian	Won
2022	Best Actor – Comedy	Baby Blues	Nominated
2022	Best Actor – Drama	Miracle in Cell No. 7	Won

== Indonesian Box Office Movie Awards ==
Year	Category	Nominated work	Result
2018	Best Leading Actor	Warkop DKI Reborn: Jangkrik Boss! Part 2	Nominated
2019	Best Leading Actor	Wiro Sableng: Pendekar Kapak Maut Naga Geni 212	Nominated

== Indonesian Choice Awards ==
Year	Category	Result
2014	Actor of the Year	Won
2015	Actor of the Year	Won
2016	Actor of the Year	Nominated
2017	Actor of the Year	Nominated
2018	Actor of the Year	Nominated

== Indonesian Movie Actors Awards ==
Year	Category	Nominated work	Result
2008	Best Actor	Radit dan Jani	Nominated
2008	Favorite Actor	Radit dan Jani	Won
2011	Best Actor	Satu Jam Saja	Nominated
2011	Favorite Actor	Satu Jam Saja	Won
2014	Best Actor	Cinta/Mati	Nominated
2014	Pemeran Utama Pria Terfavorit	Cinta/Mati	Won
2016	Best Actor	Toba Dreams	Nominated
2016	Favorite Actor	Toba Dreams	Won
2018	Best Actor	Chrisye	Nominated
2018	Favorite Actor	Chrisye	Won
2021	Best Actor	Sabar Ini Ujian	Nominated
2021	Favorite Actor	Sabar Ini Ujian	Nominated

== MTV Indonesia Movie Awards ==
Year	Category	Nominated work	Result
2004	Most Favourite Heart Melting Moment	30 Hari Mencari Cinta (with Maria Agnes)	Won
2005	Most Favourite Actor	Catatan Akhir Sekolah	Nominated
2006	Most Favourite Actor	Realita, Cinta dan Rock'n Roll	Nominated
2007	Most Favourite Actor	Badai Pasti Berlalu	Nominated

== Maya Awards ==
Year	Category	Nominated work	Result
2013	Best Actor in a Leading Role	Rumah dan Musim Hujan	Nominated
2014	Best Actor in a Leading Role	3 Nafas Likas	Nominated
2015	Best Actor in a Leading Role	Toba Dreams	Nominated
2016	Best Actor in a Leading Role	Warkop DKI Reborn: Jangkrik Boss! Part 1	Nominated
2019	Best Actor in a Leading Role	Wiro Sableng: Pendekar Kapak Maut Naga Geni 212	Nominated
2023	Best Actor in a Leading Role	Miracle in Cell No. 7	Won

== Panasonic Gobel Awards ==
Year	Category	Nominated work	Result
2011	Favorite Actor	Calon Bini	Nominated
2014	Favorite Actor	Hanya Tuhanlah yang Tahu	Nominated
