= 2014 Indonesian Movie Awards =

Film industry award ceremony

8th Annual Indonesian Movie Awards
- Date: May 14, 2014
- Location: Studio 8 RCTI, West Jakarta
- Country: Indonesia
- Hosted by: Lukman Sardi; Prisia Nasution

Television/radio coverage
- Network: RCTI

The 8th Annual Indonesian Movie Awards was held on May 14, 2014, at the Studio 8 RCTI, West Jakarta. The award show was hosted by Lukman Sardi and Prisia Nasution. And the nominations have been announced for the category of Favorite, which will be chosen by the public via SMS. As for the category of Best, will be selected by a jury that has been appointed. As a guest star who will fill the event, among them Afgan, Titi DJ, Indro Kusumonegoro, Elvy Sukaesih, Ira Swara, and Siti Badriah.

Soekarno and What They Don't Talk About When They Talk About Love leads the nominations with eight nominations each, with Cinta/Mati and Sokola Rimba followed behind with six nominations and La Tahzan with five nominations. In the night ceremonies, What They Don't Talk About When They Talk About Love were biggest winner with receiving three awards trophies each. Followed behind by film Cinta/Mati, Hari Ini Pasti Menang, Soekarno, and Sokola Rimba success taking home two awards.

For the second time, Indonesian Movie Awards honor Lifetime Achievement Award to a figure that is considered to be dedicated to the world of Indonesian film. This award is given to Rachmat Hidayat because of his dedication and totality in Indonesian film.

== Winners and nominees ==
=== Best ===
Winners are listed first and highlighted in boldface.

Best Actor	Best Actress
**Joe Taslim – La Tahzan**; Nicholas Saputra – What They Don't Talk About When They Talk About Love; Vino G. Bastian – Cinta/Mati; Ario Bayu – Soekarno; Ikranagara – Sang Kiai	**Ayushita – What They Don't Talk About When They Talk About Love**; Prisia Nasution – Sokola Rimba; Fitri Tropica – Berlian Si Etty; Atiqah Hasiholan – La Tahzan; Astrid Tiar – Cinta/Mati
Best Supporting Actor	Best Supporting Actress
**Lukman Sardi – Soekarno**; Didi Petet – Madre; Alex Komang – 9 Summers 10 Autumns; Mario Irwinsyah – Romantini; Susilo Badar – Jokowi	**Maudy Koesnaedi – Soekarno**; Christine Hakim – Sang Kiai; Dewi Irawan – 9 Summers 10 Autumns; Meriam Bellina – Slank Gak Ada Matinya; Tika Bravani – Soekarno
Best Newcomer Actor	Best Newcomer Actress
**Zendhy Zaen – Hari Ini Pasti Menang**; Migdad Addausy – Bangun Lagi Dong Lupus; Tanta Ginting – Soekarno	**Karina Salim – What They Don't Talk About When They Talk About Love**; Dira Sugandi – 9 Summers 10 Autumns; Baby Mamesah – Sayap Kecil Garuda; Iranty Purnamasari – Hasduk Berpola
Best Chemistry	Special Award: Best Children Role
**Nicholas Saputra and Ayushita – What They Don't Talk About When They Talk About Love**; Oka Antara and Kazuki Kitamaru – Killers; Vino G. Bastian and Astrid Tiar – Cinta/Mati	**Nang Kabau – Sokola Rimba**; Ersya Aurelia – Killers; Bintang Panglima – Leher Angsa; Gecca Tavara – 99 Cahaya Dilangit Eropa; Nyungsang Bungo – Sokola Rimba

=== Favorite ===
Winners are listed first and highlighted in boldface.

Favorite Actor	Favorite Actress
**Vino G. Bastian – Cinta/Mati**; Joe Taslim – La Tahzan; Nicholas Saputra – What They Don't Talk About When They Talk About Love; Ario Bayu – Soekarno; Ikranagara – Sang Kiai	**Prisia Nasution – Sokola Rimba**; Ayushita – What They Don't Talk About When They Talk About Love; Fitri Tropica – Berlian Si Etty; Atiqah Hasiholan – La Tahzan; Astrid Tiar – Cinta/Mati
Favorite Newcomer Actor	Favorite Newcomer Actress
**Zendhy Zaen – Hari Ini Pasti Menang**; Migdad Addausy – Bangun Lagi Dong Lupus; Tanta Ginting – Soekarno	**Iranty Purnamasari – Hasduk Berpola**; Karina Salim – What They Don't Talk About When They Talk About Love; Dira Sugandi – 9 Summers 10 Autumns; Baby Mamesah – Sayap Kecil Garuda
Favorite Soundtrack	Favorite Film
**"Pelangi Dan Mimpi" performed by CJR – Laskar Pelangi 2: Edensor**; "Inspirasi Sahabat" performed by Kotak – Laskar Pelangi 2: Edensor; "Jodoh Pasti Bertemu" performed by Afgan – Madre; "Firasatku" performed by Piyu (featuring Inna Kamarie) – Aku Cinta Kamu; "Sokola Rimba" performed by Bubugiri – Sokola Rimba	**Cinta/Mati**; What They Don't Talk About When They Talk About Love; Sokola Rimba; Sang Kiai; Killers; Hari Ini Pasti Menang; La Tahzan; Soekarno; 99 Cahaya Dilangit Eropa; Laskar Pelangi 2: Edensor

Lifetime Achievement Award
**Rachmat Hidayat**

== Film with most nominations and awards ==
=== Most nominations ===
The following film received most nominations:

Nominations	Film
8	Soekarno
8	What They Don't Talk About When They Talk About Love
6	Cinta/Mati
6	Sokola Rimba
5	La Tahzan
4	Sang Kiai
4	9 Summers 10 Autumns
3	Hari Ini Pasti Menang
3	Laskar Pelangi 2: Edensor
3	Killers
2	Bangun Lagi Dong Lupus
2	Berlian Si Etty
2	Hasduk Berpola
2	Madre
2	Sayap Kecil Garuda

=== Most wins ===
The following film received most nominations:

Awards	Film
3	What They Don't Talk About When They Talk About Love
2	Cinta/Mati
2	Hari Ini Pasti Menang
2	Soekarno
2	Sokola Rimba
