= Aline Jusria =

Indonesian film editor

- Born: Aline Jusria Umiati; 19 September 1978; Semarang, Central Java, Indonesia
- Occupations: Film editor; director
- Years active: 1999–present

Aline Jusria (born 19 September 1978) is an Indonesian film editor and director. She rose to prominence for her work in Alexandria in 2005. She has received three Citra Awards for Best Film Editing for her work in Sunday Morning in Victoria Park (2010), Catatan (Harian) Si Boy (2011), and Like & Share (2023).

== Career ==
Jusria graduated from SMA Negeri 1 Semarang. She then graduated from Institut Kesenian Jakarta in 2003. She initially intended to pursue a career in television, but developed an interest in film editing during her studies. She began her editing career in 1999 as a documentary film editor.

== Filmography ==
Jusria was a film editor in all films unless otherwise noted.

=== Film ===
Year	Title	Director	Notes
2005	Alexandria	Ody C. Harahap	
2007	Selamanya	Ody C. Harahap	
2008	Kawin Kontrak	Ody C. Harahap	
2008	Cinlok	Guntur Soeharjanto	
2008	Kawin Kontrak Lagi	Ody C. Harahap	
2009	Punk in Love	Ody C. Harahap	
2009	Nazar	Sofyan D. Souza	
2010	Belkibolang	Various	
2010	Ratu Kostmopolitan	Ody C. Harahap	
2010	Sunday Morning in Victoria Park	Lola Amaria	Also as actress
2010	Working Girls	Various	
2010	Satu Jam Saja	Ario Rubbik	
2011	Jakarta Deep Down	Various	Also as director of the segment "Kentang"
2011	Catatan (Harian) Si Boy	Putrama Tuta	
2011	Badai di Ujung Negeri	Agung Sentausa	
2012	#RepublikTwitter	Kuntz Agus	
2013	Laura & Marsha	Dinna Jasanti	
2013	Cinta/Mati	Ody C. Harahap	
2013	NOAH: Awal Semula	Putrama Tuta	
2014	Crush	Rizal Mantovani	
2014	Negeri Tanpa Telinga	Lola Amaria	
2014	Strawberry Surprise	Hanny R. Saputra	
2015	When Will You Get Married?	Ody C. Harahap	
2015	Cinta Selamanya	Fajar Nugros	
2016	I Am Hope	Adilla Dimitri	
2016	Pantja-Sila: Cita-Cita & Realita	Tino Saroengallo, Tio Pakusadewo	
2016	Three Sassy Sisters	Nia Dinata	
2016	Ada Cinta di SMA	Patrick Effendy	
2016	Me vs Mami	Ody C. Harahap	
2017	Stip & Pensil	Ardy Octaviand	
2017	Sweet 20	Ody C. Harahap	
2017	Banda, the Dark Forgotten Trail	Jay Subyakto	
2018	Forever Holiday in Bali	Ody C. Harahap	
2018	Bunda, Kisah Cinta 2 Kodi	Ali Eunoia, Bobby Prasetyo	
2018	#FriendsButMarried	Rako Prijanto	
2018	Run to the Beach	Riri Riza	
2018	22 Menit	Eugene Panji, Myrna Paramita	
2018	Siap Gan!	Ody C. Harahap	
2018	Turn Right Barcelona	Guntur Soeharjanto	
2018	Asal Kau Bahagia	Rako Prijanto	
2019	Newly Rich	Ody C. Harahap	
2019	Tabu: Mengusik Gerbang Iblis	Angling Sagaran	
2019	Hit & Run	Ody C. Harahap	
2019	Two Blue Stripes	Gina S. Noer	
2019	Warkop DKI Reborn 3	Rako Prijanto	
2019	Love Is a Bird	Richard Oh	
2020	#FriendsButMarried2	Rako Prijanto	
2020	Chronicle Scope	Danial Rifki	
2020	Warkop DKI Reborn 4	Rako Prijanto	
2021	Ali & Ratu Ratu Queens	Lucky Kuswandi	
2021	A World Without	Nia Dinata	
2021	First, Second & Third Love	Gina S. Noer	
2022	Srimulat: Hil yang Mustahal	Fajar Nugros	
2022	Missing Home	Bene Dion Rajagukguk	
2022	The Red Point of Marriage	Sabrina Rochelle Kalangie	
2022	Lara Ati	Bayu Skak	
2022	Gendut Siapa Takut?!	Pritagita Arianegara	
2022	The Ballads of Roy	Fajar Nugros	
2022	Like & Share	Gina S. Noer	
2023	High School Serenade	Monty Tiwa	
2023	Virgo and the Sparklings	Ody C. Harahap	
2023	Puspa Indah Taman Hati	Monty Tiwa	
2023	Petualangan Sherina 2	Riri Riza	
2023	Blessed You	Ody C. Harahap	
2023	Srimulat: Hidup Memang Komedi	Fajar Nugros	
2023	172 Days	Hadrah Daeng Ratu	
2023	Layangan Putus the Movie	Benni Setiawan	
2024	Two Blue Hearts	Gina S. Noer, Dinna Jasanti	
2024	Glenn Fredly the Movie	Lukman Sardi	
2024	The Architecture of Love	Teddy Soeriaatmadja	
2024	Seni Memahami Kekasih	Jeihan Angga	
2024	Home Sweet Loan	Sabrina Rochelle Kalangie	
2024	Pantaskah Aku Berhijab	Hadrah Daeng Ratu	
2025	Rangga & Cinta	Riri Riza	
2025	Dopamine	Teddy Soeria Atmadja	

=== Television ===
Year	Title	Director	Notes
2020	Sementara, Selamanya	Reza Rahadian	
2023	The Talent Agency	Teddy Soeriaatmadja	

== Awards and nominations ==
Citra Awards

Year	Title	Category	Result	Ref.
2010	Sunday Morning in Victoria Park	Best Film Editing	Won	
2011	Catatan (Harian) Si Boy (shared with Dinda Amanda)	Best Film Editing	Won	
2013	Laura & Marsha	Best Film Editing	Nominated	
2016	Three Sassy Sisters	Best Film Editing	Nominated	
2017	Sweet 20	Best Film Editing	Nominated	
2019	Two Blue Stripes	Best Film Editing	Nominated	
2021	Ali & Ratu Ratu Queens	Best Film Editing	Nominated	
2023	Like & Share	Best Film Editing	Won	
2024	The Architecture of Love	Best Film Editing	Nominated	
2025	Home Sweet Loan	Best Film Editing	Pending	

Maya Awards

Year	Title	Category	Result	Ref.
2012	#RepublikTwitter	Best Editing	Nominated	
2013	Noah: Awal Semula (shared with Cesa David Luckmansyah and Faesal Rizal)	Best Editing	Won	
2013	Laura & Marsha	Best Editing	Nominated	
2016	Pantja-Sila: Cita-Cita & Realita	Best Editing	Nominated	
2017	Banda, the Dark Forgotten Trail (shared with Cundra Setiabudhi and Syauqi "Bimbo" Tuasikal)	Best Editing	Nominated	
2018	#FriendsButMarried	Best Editing	Won	
2019	Two Blue Stripes	Best Editing	Nominated	
2020	#FriendsButMarried2	Best Editing	Nominated	
2022	Missing Home	Best Editing	Won	
2022	Like & Share	Best Editing	Nominated	
