= Love like the Falling Rain =

2020 film

Love Like the Falling Rain
- Theatrical release poster with original release date
- Indonesian: Seperti Hujan Yang Jatuh Ke Bumi
- Literally: Like Rain That Falls to the Ground
- Directed by: Lasja F. Susatyo
- Written by: Upi Avianto; Piu Syarif
- Based on: Seperti Hujan Yang Jatuh Ke Bumi by Boy Candra
- Produced by: Adi Sumardjono
- Starring: Jefri Nichol; Aurora Ribero; Axel Matthew Thomas; Nadya Arina
- Cinematography: Nur Hidayat
- Edited by: Wawan I. Wibowo
- Music by: Joseph S. Djafar
- Production companies: IFI Sinema; Screenplay Films
- Distributed by: Netflix
- Release date: October 15, 2020
- Running time: 86 minutes
- Country: Indonesia
- Language: Indonesian

Love Like the Falling Rain (Indonesian: Seperti Hujan Yang Jatuh Ke Bumi, lit. 'Like Rain That Falls to the Ground') is a 2020 Indonesian teen romantic drama film directed by Lasja Fauzia; written by Upi Avianto, Boy Candra, and Piu Syarif; starring Jefri Nichol, Aurora Ribero, and Axel Matthew Thomas.

== Cast ==
- Jefri Nichol as Kevin
- Aurora Ribero as Nara Senja
- Axel Matthew Thomas as Juned
- Nadya Arina as Tiara
- Karina Suwandhi as Juned's Mother
- Rebecca Klopper as Rina
- Aida Nurmala as Kevin's Mother
- Pascal Azhar as Kevin's Father
- Tina Astari as Nara's Mother
- Indra Aksa as Nara's Father
- Harris Soedarto as Farid
- Jauhar Robert as Boni
- Gerald Abdullah as Firman
- Richard Oh
- Kelly Tandiono
