= Ekspedisi Madewa =

- Directed by: Franklin Darmadi
- Written by: Michael Tjandramulya
- Produced by: Philip Korompis
- Starring: Tora Sudiro; Frans Tumbuan; Pierre Gruno; Arie Dagienkz; Intan Kaunang; Marsha Timothy; Irshadi Bagas; Indra Birowo
- Distributed by: Dantalon Entertainment
- Release date: 2006
- Running time: 97 minutes
- Country: Indonesia
- Language: Indonesian
- Budget: Rp. 6,000,000,000 (USD 700,000)

Ekspedisi Madewa (Madewa's Expedition) is a 2006 Indonesian adventure film directed by Franklin Darmadi

== Synopsis ==
In the film expedition expert, Tiro Mandawa - played by Tora Sudiro - accidentally discovers a mysterious artifact on one of his work assignments. He inadvertently unleashes a chain of events that lead to an adventure of a lifetime.

The mysterious artifact was believed to be the final missing link to an ancient Indonesian legend. Many believed that the artifact was the key to finding the ultimate source of unlimited power. This power if possessed by a righteous man, would revitalize the world for all eternity, but in the wrong hands would bring disaster and death.

Sponsored by the fictional conglomerate the Madewa Group Tiro embarks on a mission to uncover the truth about the legend. He is accompanied by his friend and loyal companion, Satrio - played by Arie Dagienkz.

== Cast ==
- Tora Sudiro
- Indra Birowo
- Arie Dagienkz
- Marsha Timothy
- Frans Tumbuan
