= Gemilang (song) =

1987 song by Krakatau

Single by Krakatau

from the album Krakatau
- Written: 1985
- Released: January 1987
- Genre: Pop
- Length: 4:09
- Label: Bulletin
- Composer: Dwiki Dharmawan
- Lyricist: Mira Lesmana

Krakatau singles chronology
"Gemilang" (1987)	"La Samba (Primadona)" (1988)

"Gemilang" (English: "Dazzling") is the song written by Indonesian film producer Mira Lesmana and musician Dwiki Dharmawan in 1985. It was released as a debut single by the Indonesian fusion band Krakatau in January 1987, through Bulletin.

"Gemilang" received positive reviews from critics, who praised its memorable production and deemed it a career highlight. The song is also used as an official theme song for the 2018 adventure film Run to the Beach.

== Background, composition and theme ==
Dharmawan began writing "Gemilang" in 1985, when he was still nineteen years old. Lyrically, the song vividly unravel "youth dazzle", which brings children and teenagers to solve their problems and save the world.

== Critical reception ==
"Gemilang" was met with generally positive reviews from music critics. Rolling Stone Indonesia placed the song at number 62 of the best Indonesian songs of all time. Tertiani ZB Simanjuntak, writing for The Jakarta Post, praised "Gemilang" as "the song started it all".

"Gemilang" on year-end list
Critic/Publication	List	Rank	Ref.
Rolling Stone	The 150 Best Indonesian Songs of All Time	62	

== Personnel ==
Credits adapted from album's liner notes.

- Dwiki Dharmawan — keyboards
- Indra Lesmana — keyboards
- Donny Suhendra — guitar
- Pra Budidharma — bass
- Trie Utami — lead vocals, background vocals
- Gilang Ramadhan — drums

== Andien version ==
"Gemilang"

Single by Andien

from the album Kirana
- Released: 2012
- Recorded: 2010
- Genre: Pop
- Label: Platinum
- Songwriters: Dwiki Dharmawan; Mira Lesmana

Music video
- "Gemilang" on YouTube

In 2010, Andien covered "Gemilang" for her fourth studio album Kirana, with an arrangement done by Nikita Dompas. Her version received generally positive reviews, including its softer and elegant arrangement.

An accompanying music video for her version of "Gemilang" was co-directed by Candi Soeleman and uploaded to her YouTube channel on 2 July 2012. Shot outside of the University of Indonesia, the video stars Indonesian actress Christine Hakim, athlete Susi Susanti, film producer Mira Lesmana, politician Meutia Hatta and designer Anne Avantie. Initially, Iwan Fals and B.J. Habibie also appear in this video, but they don't appear due to time reasons. The music video won 2013 Dahsyatnya Award for Outstanding Music Video and was nominated in the Outstanding Director category for Andien and Soeleman.

=== Personnel ===
Credits adapted from liner notes of Kirana.

- Andien — vocals
- Dimawan Kusnowo Adji — cello
- Dwiki Dharmawan — original writer
- Nikita Dompas — guitar
- Rifka Rachman — bass

== In popular culture ==
"Gemilang" appears on a 2018 Indonesian adventure film Run to the Beach, in which Indonesian trio RAN piqued their interest for the song's cover in the film's soundtrack.
