= La Tahzan =

- Poster film
- Directed by: Danial Rifki
- Written by: Jujur Prananto
- Produced by: Hb Naveen; Frederica
- Starring: Ario Bayu; Atiqah Hasiholan; Joe Taslim; Prilly Latuconsina
- Production company: Falcon Pictures
- Release date: 2 August 2013
- Running time: 100 minutes
- Country: Indonesia
- Language: Indonesian

La Tahzan is a 2013 Indonesian drama film which directed by Danial Rifki and released on 2 August 2013, by Falcon Pictures. This film starred by Atiqah Hasiholan, Ario Bayu, Joe Taslim, and Prilly Latuconsina. The film was nominated for "Movie of the Year" at the 2013 Yahoo! OMG Awards and nominated for "Favorite Film" at the 8th Annual Indonesian Movie Awards.

== Cast ==
- Atiqah Hasiholan as Viona
- Ario Bayu as Hasan
- Joe Taslim as Yamada
- Prilly Latuconsina as Neneng

== Filming process ==
This film is filmed location in Indonesia and Japan to take only 15 days. Most of the set is done in Japan: Wakayama, Kobe, Osaka, and Kyoto. Before using the title La Tahzan, at first the film will use title Orenji (Japanese language: オレンジ).

== Soundtrack ==
This film also fills the original soundtrack: "Bidadari Surga" and "Amanah Cinta" (Uje' two singles), "I Love You" from Ammir, and "Jangan Bersedih (La Tahzan)" from Merpati Band.

== Awards and nominations ==
| Year | Awards | Category | Recipients | Results |
|---|---|---|---|---|
| 2013 | Indonesian Film Festival | Best Leading Actor | Joe Taslim | Nominated |
| 2013 | Maya Awards | Best Actor in a Leading Role | Joe Taslim | Nominated |
| 2013 | Yahoo OMG! Awards | Movie of the Year | La Tahzan | Nominated |
| 2014 | Festival Film Bandung | Best Male Leading Role | Joe Taslim | Nominated |
| 2014 | Festival Film Bandung | Best Female Leading Role | Atiqah Hasiholan | Nominated |
| 2014 | Indonesian Movie Awards | Best Actor | Joe Taslim | Won |
| 2014 | Indonesian Movie Awards | Best Actress | Atiqah Hasiholan | Nominated |
| 2014 | Indonesian Movie Awards | Favorite Actor | Joe Taslim | Nominated |
| 2014 | Indonesian Movie Awards | Favorite Actress | Atiqah Hasiholan | Nominated |
| 2014 | Indonesian Movie Awards | Favorite Film | La Tahzan | Nominated |
