= Missing Home =

- Film poster
- Indonesian: Ngeri-Ngeri Sedap
- Directed by: Bene Dion Rajagukguk
- Written by: Bene Dion Rajagukguk
- Produced by: Dipa Andika
- Starring: Arswendy Beningswara Nasution; Tika Panggabean; Boris Bokir Manullang; Gita Bhebhita Butarbutar; Lolox; Indra Jegel
- Cinematography: Padri Nadeak
- Edited by: Aline Jusria
- Music by: Viky Sianipar
- Production companies: Imajinari Pictures; Visionari Film Fund
- Distributed by: Kharisma Starvision Plus; Netflix
- Release date: 2 June 2022
- Running time: 114 minutes
- Country: Indonesia
- Language: Indonesian

Missing Home (Indonesian: Ngeri-Ngeri Sedap) is a 2022 Indonesian comedy-drama film directed by Bene Dion Rajagukguk. The film stars Arswendy Beningswara Nasution, Tika Panggabean, Boris Bokir Manullang, Gita Bhebita Butarbutar, Lolox and Indra Jegel. It tells the story of the parents of a Batak family that pretend to argue so their children can come back to them in time for a tradition. It won five awards at the 2022 Maya Awards, including Best Feature Film.

The film was selected as the Indonesian entry for Best International Feature Film at the 95th Academy Awards.

== Plot ==
Pak Domu and Mak Domu are elderly Batak parents with four adult children: Sarma, Sahat, Domu, and Gabe. Sarma remains at home to care for them, while her brothers pursue careers in other cities. Longing to reunite the family ahead of an upcoming Batak Thanksgiving celebration, the parents face growing tensions with their children’s choices. Domu plans to marry a Sundanese woman, which Pak Domu fears will erode Batak traditions. Gabe has become a television comedian, despite his father’s insistence that he study law. Sahat lives away from home caring for an older man and refuses to return. Frustrated and afraid of losing their family’s cohesion, Pak Domu and Mak Domu stage arguments and pretend that a divorce is imminent, prompting the children to return home.

After an awkward family dinner, the children take their parents to Bukit Holbung and speak with each separately. Pak Domu expresses resentment at feeling unappreciated for raising the family, while Mak Domu confides that her husband’s rigidity has exhausted her. Pak Domu’s mother reveals that she is aware of the ruse and advises the children to remain until the celebration concludes.

The family attends the thanksgiving event together, but tensions persist. When Mak Domu falls ill the following day, Pak Domu uses the moment to reprimand his children for defying his expectations. Concluding that the conflict has no resolution, the children prepare to leave. A heated argument follows, during which Mak Domu, angered by her husband’s patriarchal attitude, reveals that the divorce was fabricated. Sarma, who had known of the plan in advance, breaks down, explaining that years of pressure to obey her father forced her to abandon her own aspirations. The revelation fractures the family. Mak Domu decides to pursue a genuine separation and leaves for her mother’s home with Sarma. Domu and Gabe return to their lives, while Sahat remains behind.

Pak Domu later confides in his mother, who tells him that his strict parenting mirrors his own father’s and urges him to accept that families evolve. Seeking reconciliation, Pak Domu visits each of his children. He learns that Domu’s partner is sincerely interested in Batak culture, that Sahat is respected in the community he serves, and that Gabe’s career brings joy to others. Appearing on Gabe’s show, Pak Domu publicly accepts his son’s path.

Remembering Mak Domu’s wishes, Pak Domu reunites the family at her mother’s house. Promising that they will return home together, he shares a meal with them, signaling a renewed commitment to understanding and unity. The film concludes with a Batak proverb, Sititik ma sigompa, golang-golang pangarahutna. On ma na boi tarpatupa, sai godang ma pinasuna, which means expressing hope that what has been offered will bring many blessings.

== Cast ==
- Arswendy Beningswara Nasution as Pak Domu
- Tika Panggabean as Mak Domu
- Boris Bokir as Domu Purba
- Gita Bhebhita Butar-butar as Sarma E. Purba
- Lolox as Gabe Purba
- Indra Jegel as Sahat Purba
- Rita Matu Mona as Ompung Domu

== Release ==
The film was theatrically released in Indonesia on 2 June 2022. The film garnered 2.8 million admission during its sixty four days theatrical run and it became the fourth highest-grossing Indonesian film of 2022 as of 27 October.

The film was globally distributed on streaming service Netflix on 6 October 2022.

== Accolades ==
Award	Date	Category	Recipient	Result	Ref.
Indonesian Film Festival	22 November 2022	Best Picture	Dipa Andika	Nominated	
Indonesian Film Festival	22 November 2022	Best Director	Bene Dion Rajagukguk	Nominated	
Indonesian Film Festival	22 November 2022	Best Actress	Tika Panggabean	Nominated	
Indonesian Film Festival	22 November 2022	Best Original Screenplay	Bene Dion Rajagukguk	Nominated	
Indonesian Film Festival	22 November 2022	Best Original Score	Viky Sianipar	Nominated	
Film Pilihan Tempo	18 December 2022	Film Pilihan Tempo	Missing Home	Nominated	
Film Pilihan Tempo	18 December 2022	Best Director	Bene Dion Rajagukguk	Nominated	
Film Pilihan Tempo	18 December 2022	Best Screenplay	Bene Dion Rajagukguk	Nominated	
Film Pilihan Tempo	18 December 2022	Best Actor	Arswendy Bening Swara	Nominated	
Film Pilihan Tempo	18 December 2022	Best Actress	Tika Panggabean	Nominated	
Film Pilihan Tempo	18 December 2022	Best Supporting Actress	Rita Matu Mona	Nominated	
Maya Awards	19 April 2023	Best Feature Film	Dipa Andika	Won	
Maya Awards	19 April 2023	Best Director	Bene Dion Rajagukguk	Won	
Maya Awards	19 April 2023	Best Actor in a Leading Role	Arswendy Bening Swara	Nominated	
Maya Awards	19 April 2023	Best Actress in a Leading Role	Tika Panggabean	Nominated	
Maya Awards	19 April 2023	Best Actress in a Supporting Role	Gita Bhebita	Nominated	
Maya Awards	19 April 2023	Arifin C. Noer Award for Best Brief Memorable Performance	Rita Matu Mona	Nominated	
Maya Awards	19 April 2023	Best Original Screenplay	Bene Dion Rajagukguk	Won	
Maya Awards	19 April 2023	Best Editing	Aline Jusria	Won	
Maya Awards	19 April 2023	Best Score	Viky Sianipar	Nominated	
Maya Awards	19 April 2023	Best Theme Song	Viky Sianipar for "Huta Namartuai"	Won	

== See also ==
- List of submissions to the 95th Academy Awards for Best International Feature Film
- List of Indonesian submissions for the Academy Award for Best International Feature Film
