= Khalifah (film) =

- Promotional film poster for Khalifah
- Directed by: Nurman Hakim
- Screenplay by: Nurman Hakim; Nan T. Achnas
- Produced by: Nan T. Achnas; Rieta Amilia Beta
- Starring: Marsha Timothy; Ben Joshua; Indra Herlambang
- Cinematography: Agni Ariatama
- Edited by: Ahmad Mujibur Rahman; Nurman Hakim
- Music by: Djaduk Ferianto
- Production companies: Triximages; Frame Ritz Pictures
- Release date: January 6, 2011 (Indonesia)
- Running time: 90 minutes
- Country: Indonesia
- Language: Indonesian

Khalifah is a 2011 Indonesian film directed by Nurman Hakim and starring Marsha Timothy, Ben Joshua, and Indra Herlambang.

== Plot ==
Khalifah (Marsha Timothy), a young, physically attractive woman, is working at the salon run by her deceased mother's friend Rita (Jajang C. Noer). After her shift, she goes home by bus and passes a group of three teenaged boys who make catcalls. Upon arriving at home, she talks with her father, Bilal (Brohisman), her brother Faisal (Yoga Pratama) and her father's friend Riko about Riko's nephew, Rasyid (Indra Herlambang). Khalifah is asked to marry him, and is told that it is her decision; after she sees that her father is considering selling his wedding ring to pay the rent, she agrees.

Khalifah and Rasyid are married and move in together. The two have very different habits, with Rasyid strictly following Islamic doctrine and Khalifah living a more metropolitan lifestyle; their relationship is also stressed by Rasyid often leaving for weeks at a time for business. Eventually, Rasyid convinces Khalifah to wear a headscarf; after she begins wearing it, her friends and colleagues compliment her on the choice. Meanwhile, she meets a new neighbour, the tailor Yoga (Ben Joshua), and begins to feel attracted to him; she does not act on this attraction.

Khalifah soon learns that she is pregnant. Rasyid is also overjoyed at the news, giving Khalifah a special tonic to help her with the pregnancy. However, when Khalifah miscarries during prayer while Rasyid is abroad, she is devastated; when Rasyid learns of the miscarriage, he says that it is because she has sinned and tells her to wear the niqab. Although initially displeased, she agrees. The following day, Rasyid leaves on business for two months, and Khalifah engages Yoga to make her niqab.

However, her life outside the house changes rapidly, with passersby staring, pointing, or even accusing her of being a terrorist. Although she initially attempts to quit her job at the salon as she cannot work with the niqab on and cannot be seen by other men with it off, Rita chooses to make the salon exclusively for women on Fridays and Saturdays; this results in another niqab-wearing woman, Fatimah (Titi Sjuman), to come to the salon. Fatimah is able to answer Khalifah's questions on the garment and its social context.

Khalifah learns that she is pregnant again, and tells Rasyid when he returns. Although he is at first happy, he becomes increasingly withdrawn; he soon leaves again. Yoga leaves for Saudi Arabia to work as a tailor there. Not long afterwards, as Khalifah is preparing to go to work, she is stopped by a woman on the street who accuses her of being a terrorist; Khalifah is soon picked up and questioned by the police, only to be released when the chief indicates that Bilal, his former teacher, is her father.

As Khalifah is recovering at her family's home, she sees on television that a group of suspected terrorists were caught in a firefight with police, and a niqab-wearing gunman was killed. Immediately afterwards there is a knock at the door, with the police having come to ask Khalifah to identify Rasyid's body; in the morgue, she meets Rasyid's other wife and child, of whom she had no knowledge. Upon returning home, she removes everything that connected her to Rasyid, including the niqab.

Several months later, with her baby already born, Khalifah receives a package in the post from Yoga; inside, she sees that it is a new niqab. Trying it on in a mirror, she takes it off and says "I am Khalifah".

== Production ==
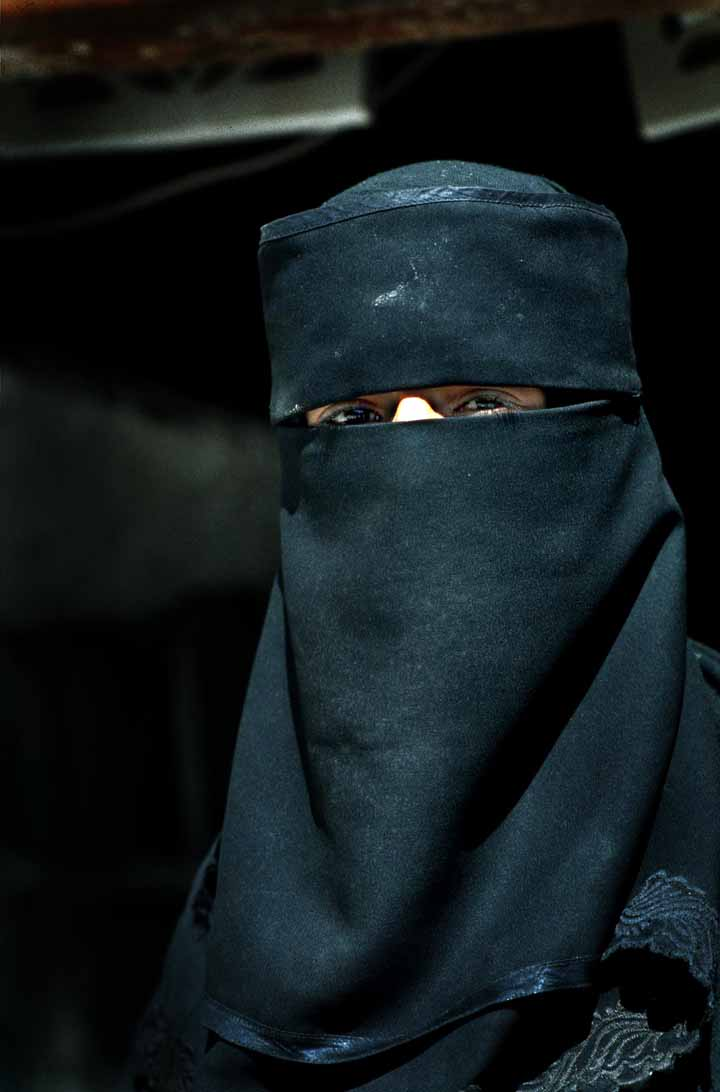
Hakim noted that the film was meant to address controversy over the niqab (example pictured) in Europe.

Director Nurman Hakim chose the name Khalifah for the title character for its connotations in the Arab world; literally meaning "leader", Khalifah is used for men. He notes that the film was meant to address the controversy over burqas in Europe, such as French, Spanish, and Belgian attempts to ban the veils. Khalifah was his second film, after 3 Doa 3 Cinta (3 Prayers 3 Loves; 2009).

The film was produced by Triximages and Frame Ritz Pictures. Triximages, owned by Nan Achnas and Nurman Hakim, has a history of producing award winning films since the children's film Bendera (Flag) competed in the Tokyo International Film Festival in 2003; Frame Ritz Pictures, though generally working in soap operas and miniseries, had previously produced two feature-length films.

Although the character of Khalifah is 23, 30-year-old Marsha Timothy was cast in the starring role. It was also the feature-film debut of Indra Herlambang, a long-standing television host.

== Themes ==
Hakim notes that he attempted to draw on the subjectivity surrounding the niqab and burqa. He notes that Khalifah can observe what others are doing without being noticed, but she is also discriminated against. Film critic Wicaksono Adi also notes the discrepancy, writing that although Khalifah must deal with negative reactions from society, she finds a sort of "freedom": freedom from the stares of men.

Wicaksono also notes that although Rasyid is easily identified as an Islamic fundamentalist, dogmatic issues are set aside to deal with Khalifah's personal experiences; the personal aspects of the film are emphasized over the ideological ones. Nunuy Nurhayati in Tempo writes that the other characters' piousness is shown through their physical actions, such as Yoga aiding Khalifah in picking up her groceries after she dropped them.

Cynthia Webb, a member of the Australia Indonesia Arts Alliance, writes that Khalifah is an "invitation to discuss the wearing of the niqab". She notes that it reflects polemics about the veil, with Fatimah's admonition, that one should not wear it unless one is certain, a "veiled warning" for the Indonesian populace.

== Release and reception ==
Khalifah was released on 6 January 2011. Indah Setiawati, writing for The Jakarta Post, wrote that the film was successful in its delivery of its message and had good acting, but moved slowly at times. Nunuy Nurhayati in Tempo writes that, although the film takes a new angle in discussing issues related to the niqab, it does not explore Khalifah's inner struggle enough. A review from entertainment news website KapanLagi.com noted that the film would improve the viewers' worldview of everyday issues, not only those related to Islam.
