= Run to the Beach =

- Theatrical release poster
- Directed by: Riri Riza
- Written by: Arie Kriting; Mira Lesmana; Gina S. Noer; Riri Riza
- Produced by: Mira Lesmana
- Starring: Maisha Kanna; Lil'li Latisha; Marsha Timothy; Suku Dani; Dodit Mulyanto
- Cinematography: Gunnar Nimpuno
- Edited by: Aline Jusria
- Music by: Aksan Sjuman
- Production company: Miles Films
- Release date: 28 June 2018
- Running time: 112 minutes
- Country: Indonesia
- Language: Indonesian
- Box office: Rp 15,4 billion

Run to the Beach (Indonesian: Kulari Ke Pantai) is a 2018 Indonesian adventure comedy film directed by Riri Riza. Produced by Miles Films in association with BASE, Ideosource and Go-Studio, the film stars the ensemble cast led by Maisha Kanna and Lil'li Latisha.

== Cast ==
- Maisha Kanna as Samudra
- Lil’li Latisha as Happy
- Marsha Timothy as Uci
- Ibnu Jamil as Irfan
- Suku Dani as Dani
- Varun Tandjung as Baruna
- Edward Suhadi as Edi
- Francy as Fifi
- Karina Suwandi as Kirana
- Lukman Sardi as Arya
- M. Adhiyat as Dion
- Fadlan Ridzal as Wahyu
- Dodit Mulyanto as Mukhidi
- Ligwina Hananto as Mela
- Mo Sidik as wave surfer
- Praz Teguh and Yudha Khan as satay sellers

== Soundtrack ==
Indonesian pop trio RAN sang the film's official theme song, "Selamat Pagi", with the film's lead cast Maisha Kanna and Lil'li Latisha. Other songs, including its main theme "Kulari Ke Pantai", "Hijau dan Biru" and a cover of Dwiki Dharmawan's "Gemilang" also appear in this film.

== Release ==
Run to the Beach was widely released on 28 June 2018. Later, the film made its television premiere on SCTV on 6 June 2019 at 2.30pm local time.

== Reception ==
Run to the Beach received generally positive reviews from Tempo.
