= Frans Tumbuan =

Indonesian actor (1939–2015)

Frans Karel Leopold Tumbuan (3 August 1939 – 23 March 2015) was an Indonesian actor. He spent part of his childhood in the Netherlands, where he began acting.

He appeared in many Indonesian movies including US-Indonesian productions such as Sam Firstenberg's Blood Warriors and Guy Norris's Rage and Honor II (both 1993).

== Selected filmography ==
- 2007 – Dead Time: Kala
- 2006 – Reality, Love and Rock 'n Roll
- 2006 – Ekspedisi Madewa
- 2002 – What's Up with Love?
- 1997 – Gordel van smaragd
- 1995 – Without Mercy
- 1993 – Blood Warriors
- 1993 – Rage and Honor II
- 1988 – Jakarta
- 1988 – Java Burn
- 1980 – Perempuan dalam pasungan
