= Tika Panggabean =

Indonesian actress and singer (born 1970)

- Born: Kartika Rachel Setia Redjeki Panggabean; October 3, 1970 (age 55); Jakarta, Indonesia
- Other name: Tika Project Pop
- Education: Universitas Katolik Parahyangan
- Occupations: Celebrity; Singer; Presenter; Radio personality; Comedian
- Years active: 1994–present
- Height: 174 cm (5 ft 9 in)
- Musical career
- Label: Musica Studios
- Member of: Project Pop

Kartika "Tika" Panggabean (born 3 October 1970) is an Indonesian actress, singer, presenter, comedian and radio personality. She is a member of Indonesian comedy pop vocal group Project Pop since its inception in 1996. As an actress, she rose to prominence for her character Saodah in RCTI sitcom OB (Office Boy) (2006–2008).

She received a Citra Award for Best Actress nomination for her performance in Missing Home (2022).

== Career ==
During her studies at the Universitas Katolik Parahyangan, she joined the campus comedy troupe Padhyangan. Along with other members, Panggabean co-founded a comedy pop vocal group Project Pop in 1996. They released their first studio album, Lumpia Vs Bakpia during the same year. In 1997, she started her career as a radio personality at Hard Rock FM.

In 2003 she made her acting debut in Nia Dinata's comedy drama film Arisan!, playing the role of a masseuse. She then joined the main cast of sitcom OB (Office Boy) from 2006 to 2009, portraying the character Saodah. In 2007, she served as a guest judge for the fourth season of the reality competition series Indonesian Idol, alongside other judges: Anang Hermansyah, Titi DJ, Jamie Aditya, and Indra Lesmana.

In 2021 she joined the cast of drama film Ali & Ratu Ratu Queens as Ance, an Indonesian immigrant living in Queens, New York. In 2022, she starred in the leading role in the drama film, Missing Home as Mak Domu. For her performance, she received a Citra Award nomination for Best Actress. She reprised her role as Ance in the 2025 Netflix original series Ratu Ratu Queens: The Series, a prequel of the film.

== Filmography ==
=== Film ===
Year	Title	Role	Notes
2003	Arisan!	Masseuse	
2010	Red Cobex	Mama Ana	
2010	Laskar Pemimpi	Sri Mulyani	
2014	Aku, Kau & KUA	Ratna	
2016	Talak 3	Inggrid	
2017	Sweet 20	Bunga	
2019	Glorious Days	Retno	
2019	Hit & Run	Mak Dona	
2021	Ali & Ratu Ratu Queens	Ance	
2021	Selesai	Yani	
2022	Missing Home	Mak Domu	

=== Television ===
Year	Title	Role	Network	Notes
2006–2009	Office Boy (OB)	Saodah	RCTI	
2018	OB OK	Saodah	RCTI	
2023–2024	Induk Gajah	Mamak Uli	Prime Video	
2025	Ratu Ratu Queens: The Series	Ance	Netflix	
