= Like & Share =

2022 drama film

- Theatrical release poster
- Directed by: Gina S. Noer
- Written by: Gina S. Noer
- Produced by: Chand Parwez Servia; Gina S. Noer
- Starring: Aurora Ribero; Arawinda Kirana; Aulia Sarah; Jerome Kurnia
- Cinematography: Deska Binarso
- Edited by: Aline Jusria
- Music by: Aria Prayogi
- Production companies: Starvision; Wahana Kreator Nusantara
- Release dates: 27 November 2022 (Jogja); 8 December 2022 (Indonesia)
- Running time: 112 minutes
- Country: Indonesia
- Language: Indonesian

Like & Share is a 2022 adult drama film written and directed by Gina S. Noer. The film stars Aurora Ribero and Arawinda Kirana.

The film had its world premiere at the 17th Jogja-NETPAC Asian Film Festival on 27 November 2022.

== Premise ==
The two schoolgirls and best friends Lisa and Sarah create ASMR content on social media together until the dynamic between the two of them changes after the former becomes obsessed with pornography and the latter dates an older man. This causes the girls to discover a world of personal exploration that leads them toward harrowing outcomes.

== Cast ==
- Aurora Ribero as Lisa
- Arawinda Kirana as Sarah
- Aulia Sarah as Fita
- Jerome Kurnia as Devan
- Kevin Julio as Ario
- Unique Priscilla as Dinda
- Juliette Wirawan as Via
- Joshua Pandelaki as Pak Haji Ahmad
- Omara Esteghlal as Ino
- Sahira Anjani as Mima
- Valerie Krasnadewi as Mbak Ajeng
- Veronika Krasnasari as Mbak Echa

== Release ==
Like & Share had its world premiere at the 17th Jogja-NETPAC Asian Film Festival on 27 November 2022, competing for the Golden Hanoman Award. The film was released in Indonesian theatres on 8 December 2022. It was also screened at the 52nd International Film Festival Rotterdam during the "Harbour" program. The film was also screened at the 18th Osaka Asian Film Festival, where it won the Grand Prix.

Netflix acquired the film's distribution in Indonesia, releasing it on 27 April 2023.

== Accolades ==
Award / Film Festival	Date of ceremony	Category	Recipient(s)	Result	Ref.
Jogja-NETPAC Asian Film Festival	3 December 2022	Golden Hanoman Award	Gina S. Noer	Nominated	
Film Pilihan Tempo	18 December 2022	Film Pilihan Tempo	Like & Share	Nominated	
Film Pilihan Tempo	18 December 2022	Tempo's Choice Director	Gina S. Noer	Nominated	
Film Pilihan Tempo	18 December 2022	Tempo's Choice Actress	Aurora Ribero	Nominated	
Film Pilihan Tempo	18 December 2022	Tempo's Choice Actress	Arawinda Kirana	Nominated	
Film Pilihan Tempo	18 December 2022	Tempo's Choice Supporting Actress	Aulia Sarah	Nominated	
Film Pilihan Tempo	18 December 2022	Tempo's Choice Supporting Actress	Unique Priscilla	Nominated	
Film Pilihan Tempo	18 December 2022	Tempo's Choice Screenplay	Gina S. Noer	Won	
Osaka Asian Film Festival	19 March 2023	Grand Prix	Like & Share	Won	
Maya Awards	20 April 2023	Best Feature Film	Chand Parwez Servia and Gina S. Noer	Nominated	
Maya Awards	20 April 2023	Best Director	Gina S. Noer	Nominated	
Maya Awards	20 April 2023	Best Actress in a Leading Role	Aurora Ribero	Nominated	
Maya Awards	20 April 2023	Best Actress in a Supporting Role	Aulia Sarah	Nominated	
Maya Awards	20 April 2023	Best Original Screenplay	Gina S. Noer	Nominated	
Maya Awards	20 April 2023	Best Cinematography	Deska Binarso	Nominated	
Maya Awards	20 April 2023	Best Editing	Aline Jusria	Nominated	
Maya Awards	20 April 2023	Best Sound	Aria Prayogi, Muhammad Akbar Patawari, and M. Ichsan Rachmaditta	Nominated	
Maya Awards	20 April 2023	Best Poster Design	Alvin Hariz	Won	
Maya Awards	20 April 2023	Best Costume Design	Dara Asvia	Nominated	
Maya Awards	20 April 2023	Best Art Direction	Dita Gambiro	Nominated	
Indonesian Film Festival	14 November 2023	Best Picture	Chand Parwez Servia and Gina S. Noer	Nominated	
Indonesian Film Festival	14 November 2023	Best Director	Gina S. Noer	Nominated	
Indonesian Film Festival	14 November 2023	Best Actress	Aurora Ribero	Nominated	
Indonesian Film Festival	14 November 2023	Best Supporting Actress	Aulia Sarah	Nominated	
Indonesian Film Festival	14 November 2023	Best Original Screenplay	Gina S. Noer	Nominated	
Indonesian Film Festival	14 November 2023	Best Cinematography	Deska Binarso	Nominated	
Indonesian Film Festival	14 November 2023	Best Film Editing	Aline Jusria	Won	
Indonesian Film Festival	14 November 2023	Best Sound	Aria Prayogi, M. Ichsan Rachmaditta, and Muhammad Akbar Patawari	Won	
Indonesian Film Festival	14 November 2023	Best Art Direction	Dita Gambiro	Won	
Indonesian Film Festival	14 November 2023	Best Costume Design	Dara Asvia	Nominated	
Indonesian Film Festival	14 November 2023	Best Makeup	Astrid Sambudiono	Nominated	
