= The Red Point of Marriage =

2022 melodrama film

- Theatrical release poster
- Directed by: Sabrina Rochelle Kalangie
- Screenplay by: Sabrina Rochelle Kalangie; Titien Wattimena
- Based on: Noktah Merah Perkawinan by Buce Malawau
- Produced by: Gope T. Samtani
- Starring: Marsha Timothy; Oka Antara; Sheila Dara Aisha
- Cinematography: Mawan Kelana
- Edited by: Aline Jusria
- Music by: Ifa Fachir; Dimas Wibisana
- Production company: Rapi Films
- Release date: 15 September 2022 (Indonesia)
- Running time: 119 minutes
- Country: Indonesia
- Language: Indonesian

The Red Point of Marriage (Indonesian: Noktah Merah Perkawinan) is a 2022 melodrama romantic film directed by Sabrina Rochelle Kalangie from a screenplay she wrote with Titien Wattimena, based on the 1996 soap opera. It stars Marsha Timothy, Oka Antara, and Sheila Dara Aisha. All three received Citra Award nominations for their performances in this film for Best Actress, Best Actor, and Best Supporting Actress, respectively, at the 2022 Indonesian Film Festival. The film was released theatrically in Indonesia on 15 September 2022.

== Premise ==
A married couple who have been together for eleven years hits rock bottom after the arrival of a young woman who threatens their marriage.

== Cast ==
- Marsha Timothy as Ambarwati
- Oka Antara as Gilang Priambodo
- Sheila Dara Aisha as Yulinar
- Jaden Ocean as Bagas
- Alleyra Fakhira as Ayu
- Nungki Kusumastuti as Marissa Sugondo
- Ratna Riantiarno as Lastri Priambodo
- Roy Sungkono as Kemal
- Nazira C. Noer as Dina
- Ayu Azhari as Kartika. She portrayed Ambar in the 1996 soap opera.

== Production ==
In 2019, it was announced that Rapi Films would adapt the soap opera into a feature film. Principal photography took place in October 2020 for nineteen days during the Indonesia large-scale social restrictions. In February 2022, Rapi Films released the teaser trailer of the film.

== Release ==
The Red Point of Marriage was released theatrically in Indonesia on 15 September 2022. It garnered 116,861 admissions during its theatrical run. Netflix acquired its distribution rights, releasing it on 12 January 2023. The film made its linear television premiere on Trans7 on 10 February 2024, and also released on Vidio on 19 October 2025.

== Accolades ==
Award / Film Festival	Date of ceremony	Category	Recipient(s)	Result	Ref.
Indonesian Film Festival	22 November 2022	Best Actor	Oka Antara	Nominated	
Indonesian Film Festival	22 November 2022	Best Actress	Marsha Timothy	Nominated	
Indonesian Film Festival	22 November 2022	Best Supporting Actress	Sheila Dara Aisha	Nominated	
Indonesian Film Festival	22 November 2022	Best Adapted Screenplay	Titien Wattimena and Sabrina Rochelle Kalangie	Nominated	
