= Coklat Stroberi =

2007 Indonesian comedy-drama film

- Directed by: Ardy Octaviand
- Written by: Upi Avianto
- Produced by: Adiyanto Sumardjono; Upi Avianto; Khristo Damar Alam
- Starring: Marsha Timothy; Marrio Medhithia; Nino Fernandez; Nadia Saphira; Fauzi Baadila
- Cinematography: Mas Panji; Romi Arnold
- Edited by: Herman Kumala Panca
- Production company: IFI Sinema
- Distributed by: Citra Entertainment Group
- Release date: 14 June 2007
- Running time: 97 minutes
- Country: Indonesia
- Language: Indonesian

Coklat Stroberi (Chocolate Strawberry) is a 2007 Indonesian teen drama comedy directed by Ardy Octaviand and written by Upi Avianto.

== Synopsis ==
The film tells the story of two young female university students, Key and Citra, who share a house in a plush Jakarta suburb. Due to difficulties in paying their rent, their landlady forces two new male tenants on them, Nesta and Aldi. Key and Citra, despite their beauty, are for some unexplained reason very unlucky in love and fear that they will end up as spinsters. They immediately fall for their handsome housemates. Unbeknown to them, the two young men are actually lovers, though various visual clues ensure that the audience is let in on the secret. While Nesta has a very masculine and straight-acting look, Aldi is feminine and moody. Nesta explains to Aldi – and to the audience – the theory of chocolate strawberry. Basically, strawberry equates to feminine and gay, and so in order not to be found out it is important to act chocolate – that is, to act masculine and straight. As well as more innocent ways of showing that one is straight, such as doing weight training, spending hours on the PlayStation, and not cooking, Nesta decides it would be a good ploy to start flirting with and eventually dating Key. Aldi becomes increasingly jealous as he sees his love of the last two years devoting far too much attention to Key.

Meanwhile, Citra starts flirting with Aldi, although he notices none of her various manoeuvres. Aldi decides he will lie no longer, and when his parents come to dinner, he comes out to them. His father has an asthma attack, such is his shock and disgust, and his mother leaves with his father, urging Aldi to revert to how he used to be. Things further come to a head when Citra and Key walk in on the two men as they are kissing. But instead of admitting it was all a deception, Nesta states that he really is in love with Key. Nesta has turned truly chocolate (or straight). Key initially rejects Nesta for lying to her, but returns to him after having run through the Jakarta night to stop him before he leaves forever. So it seems we have the conclusion: Nesta is turned straight by the charms of the pretty Key; Citra is still alone due to her distrust of men; Aldi is also to spend his life alone as a sad but out homosexual. However, in the final scene, as is demanded by romantic comedies, everyone is provided with a partner: Citra wins the attention of a cool rocker at a pop concert, and then Aldi appears hand in hand with Citra's boss, Dani. Incidentally, the punk-looking Dani is played by Fauzi Baadilla, one of Indonesia's most in-demand young actors, someone generally associated with far more macho roles.

== Cast ==
- Marsha Timothy
- Marrio Medhithia
- Nino Fernandez
- Nadia Saphira
