= Vino G. Bastian =

Indonesian actor and model

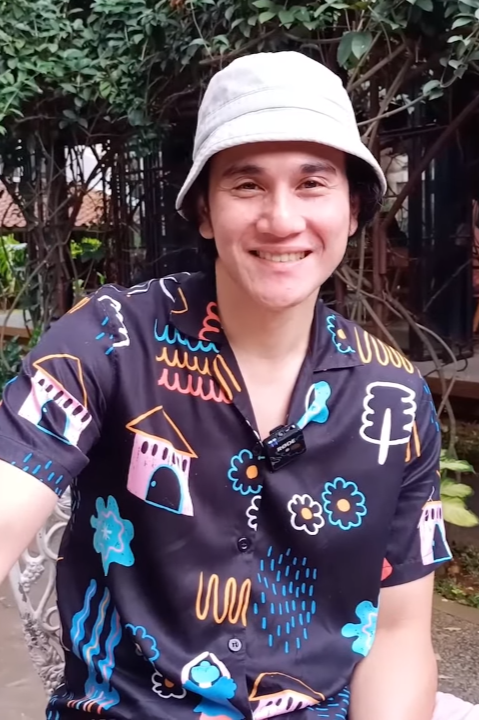
- Bastian in 2023
- Born: Vino Giovanni Bastian; 24 March 1982 (age 44); Jakarta, Indonesia
- Education: Institute Technology of Indonesia
- Occupations: Actor; model
- Years active: 2004—present
- Spouse: Marsha Timothy (m. 2012)
- Children: 1

Vino Giovanni Bastian (born 24 March 1982) is an Indonesian actor and model. He is the son of famous novelist in Indonesia, Bastian Tito, and husband of Indonesian actress and model, Marsha Timothy. Bastian is a seven times nominee of Citra Awards.

He is one of the actors who won the Citra Award for "Best Actor" at the Indonesian Film Festival. He won it in 2008 for his work in Radit dan Jani, simultaneously with the female lead in the same film, Fahrani, who won the Citra Award for "Best Actress".

== Early life ==
Bastian was born on 24 March 1982 in Jakarta, Indonesia. He is the youngest of five children from Bastian Tito and Herna Debby. His father is of Minang blood, while the mother is Minahasan. In junior high school, he started playing music as a drummer, and later became a model.

== Career ==
Bastian made his debut as an actor through the 2004 film 30 Hari Mencari Cinta. The film, directed by Upi Avianto, he plays the character of a man who turns out to be gay. The film is starred by actresses Nirina Zubir, Maria Agnes, Dinna Olivia, and Revaldo Fifaldi.

Due to his role in his first film, made Erwin Arnada, director of Rexinema, to recast him in the 2005 film Catatan Akhir Sekolah, directed by Hanung Bramantyo. In 2006, with the direction of Upi Avianto, Bastian played in the film Realita, Cinta dan Rock'n Roll. The film stars Herjunot Ali and Puteri Indonesia, Nadine Chandrawinata. She later appeared in several films, including Pesan Dari Surga (2006) and the remake of Badai Pasti Berlalu (2007). In 2008, he won the Citra Awards as Best Actor and won the Indonesian Movie Awards as Favorite Actor, Best Couple, and Favorite Couple (with Fahrani) for his role as Radit in Radit and Jani.

In 2009, Bastian shifted Tora Sudiro from the top of the ranking of the highest-paid and best-paid Indonesian film actors in history, with an honorarium of IDR250 million per film.

In 2013, Bastian played a religious-breathing soap opera for the first time with his role in Hanya Tuhanlah yang Tahu during the Ramadan. He played as Ustaz Zen, who is assigned by Kyai Din to preach in a village inhabited by criminals. In April 2014, Bastian stars in a biographical film produced by Oreima Pictures, 3 Nafas Likas, directed by Rako Prijanto. Bastian played as Djamin Ginting, the husband of the film's title, Likas, played by Atiqah Hasiholan).

After taking a break from the television for 9 years, he returned in Menolak Talak (2022) with his role as Alif Kodri.

== Filmography ==
=== Film ===
Key
†	Denotes productions that have not yet been released

Year	Title	Role	Notes	Ref.
2004	30 Hari Mencari Cinta	Erik	Debut	
2005	Catatan Akhir Sekolah	Arian		
2005	Cinta Silver	Cowok ABG		
2006	Realita, Cinta dan Rock'n Roll	Ipang		
2006	Foto, Kotak Jendela	Reno Barata		
2006	Pesan dari Surga	Prana		
2007	Badai Pasti Berlalu	Leo		
2007	Coklat Stroberi	Rock singer		
2007	Tentang Cinta	Evan		
2008	Radit dan Jani	Radit		
2008	In the Name of Love	Abimanyu Hidayat		
2009	Punk in Love	Arok		
2009	The Police	Jono		
2009	Serigala Terakhir	Jarot		
2010	Satu Jam Saja	Andika		
2013	Cinta Mati	Jaya		
2013	Mika	Mika		
2013	Tampan Tailor	Topan		
2013	Madre	Tansen Roy Wuisan		
2013	Air Mata Terakhir Bunda	Delta Santoso		
2014	3 Nafas Likas	Djamin Ginting		
2014	Tabula Rasa	—N/a	Co-producer	
2015	Rock N Love	Robin		
2015	Toba Dreams	Ronggur		
2016	Talak 3	Bagas		
2016	Super Didi	Arka		
2016	Bangkit!	Addri		
2016	Warkop DKI Reborn: Jangkrik Boss! Part 1	Kasino Hadiwibowo		
2017	Warkop DKI Reborn: Jangkrik Boss! Part 2	Kasino Hadiwibowo		
2017	Chrisye	Chrisye		
2018	Hoax	Ragil		
2018	Wiro Sableng: Pendekar Kapak Maut Naga Geni 212	Wiro Sableng		
2020	Sabar Ini Ujian	Sabar		
2021	Hari yang Dijanjikan	Puji		
2022	Baby Blues	Andika		
2022	Miracle in Cell No. 7	Dodo Rozak		
2022	Perfect Strangers	Tomo		
2022	Qodrat	Ustad Qodrat		
2023	Bayi Ajaib	Kosim		
2023	Scandal Makers	Oskar		
2023	Kembang Api	Anton	Special appearance	
2023	Buya Hamka Vol. 1	Abdul Malik Karim Amrullah		
2023	Hitmen	Jonny		
2023	Gampang Cuan	Sultan Abdulghani / Utan		
2023	Hamka & Siti Raham Vol. 2	Abdul Malik Karim Amrullah		
2024	Kang Mak from Pee Mak	Kang Makmur		
2024	My Annoying Brother	Jaya Solihin		
2024	2nd Miracle in Cell No. 7	Dodo Rozak		
2025	Qodrat 2	Ustad Qodrat		
2025	Hanya Namamu Dalam Doaku	Arga		
2025	Lost in the Spotlight	Vino Agustian		
TBA	Buya Hamka Vol. 3 †	Abdul Malik Karim Amrullah		
TBA	Drunken Monster †			
TBA	Lockdown: Pandemic Thriller †	Dante		

=== Television series ===
Year	Title	Role	Notes	Ref.
2010–2011	Arini	Galang	2 seasons	
2011	Calon Bini	Akbar		
2013	Hanya Tuhanlah yang Tahu	Ustad Zen		
2022	Menolak Talak	Alif Alqodry		

=== Web series ===
Year	Title	Role	Notes	Ref.
2020	Serigala Terakhir	Jarot	Flashback scenes	
2023	Sabtu Bersama Bapak	Gunawan Garnida / Wawan		

=== Television film ===
- Bosku Malang Bosku Sayang (2008)
- Selalu Untuk Selamanya (2009)
- Di Binatu Ada Cinta
- Bejo Bilang Cinta (2010)
- Berawal Dari Facebook (2010)
- Lost in Solo (2010)
- Jomblo Karena Cinta (2010)
- Kekasih Untuk Benny (2010)
- Separuh Jiwaku Kembali (2010)
- Rasa Cinta Olive (2010)
- Gadis Pengantar Telur (2010)
- Ali Sopan, Anak Pesantren (2010)
- Cowok Badung
- Kisah Cinta Surti dan Tejo (2011)
- Cinta Di Antara 3 Perempuan (2011)
- Satu Cinta Untuk Selamanya
- Hatiku Dicuri Mas Paijo (2011)
- Jangan Kau Curi Hatiku (2011)
- Silat Boy Pulang Kampung (2011)
- Cinta Di Kandang Sapi (2012)
- Satpol PP Jatuh Cinta (2012)
- Kesambit Cinta Anak Pendekar (2012)
- Cintaku Full Tidak Setengah Setengah (2012)
- Mutiara Cinta dari Bromo
- Sayembara Berhadiah Cinta
- Eat, Pray and Love ala Mas Jarwo (2012)
- Pacarin Camat (2012)
- Kecil Kecil Jurangan Kontrakan (2012)
- Puskesmas I am in Love (2012)
- Sweet Love (2012) as Robbie
- Romantika Supir Gadungan dan Pembantu Majikan (2012)
- Romantika Di Balik Gempa (2012)
- Pak Guru Rebutan (2013)
- Kesandung Cinta Pengamen Cantik (2013)
- Cinta Rasa Es Krim (2013)
- Gaun Pengantin (2013)
- Jodoh Enggak Bakalan Ketukar (2013)
- Pembantu Tak Pernah Ingkar Janji (2014) as Jemmy
- Delivery

=== Music video appearances ===
- Liza Natalia – "Cincin"
- Reza Artamevia – "Cinta Kita"
- Cokelat – "Luka Lama"
- Kahitna – "Tentang Diriku"
- Ratu – "Salahkah Diriku Terlalu Mencintaimu"
- Rossa – "Wanita Yang Kau Pilih"
- Audy Item – "Pergi Cinta"
- Kerispatih – "Tapi Bukan Aku"
- Ari Lasso – OST. "Badai Pasti Berlalu"
- Ipang – "Tentang Cinta"
- Astrid – "Merpati Putih"
- Acha Septriasa – "Cinta Bertahan"
- Gigi – "Bye Bye"
- Luna Maya – "Tak Bisa Bersamamu"
- Kotak – "Kamu Adalah"
- Andmesh Kamaleng – "Andaikan Kau Datang"
