= Ayushita =

Indonesia singer, actress, dancer (born 1989)

- Born: Ayushita Widyartoeti Nugraha; 9 June 1989 (age 37); Jakarta, Indonesia
- Occupations: singer; actress; dancer
- Years active: 2002–present
- Musical career
- Genres: Pop; R&B; dance; hip-hop; soul
- Instrument: Vocals
- Labels: Aquarius Musikindo; Ivy League Music

Ayushita Widyartoeti Nugraha, better known as Ayushita, (born 9 June 1989) is an Indonesian singer, actress and dancer of Indonesian Javanese descent.

== Career ==
Nugraha started her film career in 2005 and she starred in the film Me vs. High Heels. She joined the musical band group BBB, fronted Melly Goeslaw, in 2007. She is currently focusing on acting in television soap operas and advertisements.

== Music career ==
=== Compilation album ===
- Ost. Ketika Cinta Bertasbih (2009)

=== Soundtrack album ===
- Ost. Bukan Bintang Biasa (2006)

=== Singles ===
| Year | Title | Album | Label |
|---|---|---|---|
| 2007 | "Tak Mau Sendiri" | Ost. Bukan Bintang Biasa | Aquarius Musikindo |
| 2007 | "Jangan Bilang Tidak" (with Raffi Ahmad) | Ost. Bukan Bintang Biasa | Aquarius Musikindo |
| 2008 | "Tuhan Beri Aku Cinta" | Ost. Ketika Cinta Bertasbih | Aquarius Musikindo |
| 2013 | "Apa Ini Cinta" | Ost. Apa Ini Cinta | Aquarius Musikindo |
| 2013 | "Fufu Fafa" | Morning Sugar | Ivy League Music |
| 2013 | "Morning Sugar" | Morning Sugar | Ivy League Music |

== Filmography ==
=== Film ===
| Year | Title | Role | Notes |
|---|---|---|---|
| 2005 | Me vs. High Heels | Sasha | Lead role |
| 2007 | Bukan Bintang Biasa | Ayu | Lead role |
| 2011 | Langit Biru | Moniq | Supporting role |
| 2013 | What They Don't Talk About When They Talk About Love | Fitri | Lead role Won – 2013 Maya Awards for Best Actress in a Supporting Role; Nominated – 2013 Indonesian Film Festival for Best Female Supporting Role; Won – 2014 Indonesian Movie Awards for Best Actress; Nominated – 2014 Indonesian Movie Awards for Favorite Actress; Won – 2014 Indonesian Movie Awards for Best Chemistry (with Nicholas Saputra) |
| 2024 | Home Sweet Loan | Kamala | Won – Film Pilihan Tempo 2024 for Best Supporting Actress |
| 2026 | My Mother | Sri | World premiere at the Busan |

=== Television ===
| Year | Title | Role | Notes | Network |
|---|---|---|---|---|
| 2008 | Zahra | Zahra | Lead role Only until Episode 14 | SCTV |
| 2014 | Salon Cimey | Naomi | Sitcom show | Kompas TV |
| 2014 | Gebyar BCA | Herself | Exclusive variety show | NET. |
| 2015 | The East | Putri | Sitcom show | NET. |

=== Film Television ===
| Year | Title | Role | Notes |
|---|---|---|---|
| 2003 | Berkisar Merah | Alisa | Lead role |
| 2007 | Spagethi | | Lead role |

== Awards and nominations ==
| Year | Award | Category | Recipients | Results |
|---|---|---|---|---|
| 2004 | Indonesian Film Festival | Best Newcomer Actress | Berkisar Merah | Won |
| 2013 | Maya Awards | Best Actress in a Supporting Role | What They Don't Talk About When They Talk About Love | Won |
| 2013 | Indonesian Film Festival | Best Supporting Actress | What They Don't Talk About When They Talk About Love | Nominated |
| 2014 | Indonesian Movie Awards | Best Actress | What They Don't Talk About When They Talk About Love | Won |
| 2014 | Indonesian Movie Awards | Favorite Actress | What They Don't Talk About When They Talk About Love | Nominated |
| 2014 | Indonesian Movie Awards | Best Chemistry (with Nicholas Saputra) | What They Don't Talk About When They Talk About Love | Won |
| 2015 | Showbiz Indonesia Awards | Celebrity of the Year | Ayushita | Won |
