= Marsha Timothy =

Indonesian actress (born 1979)

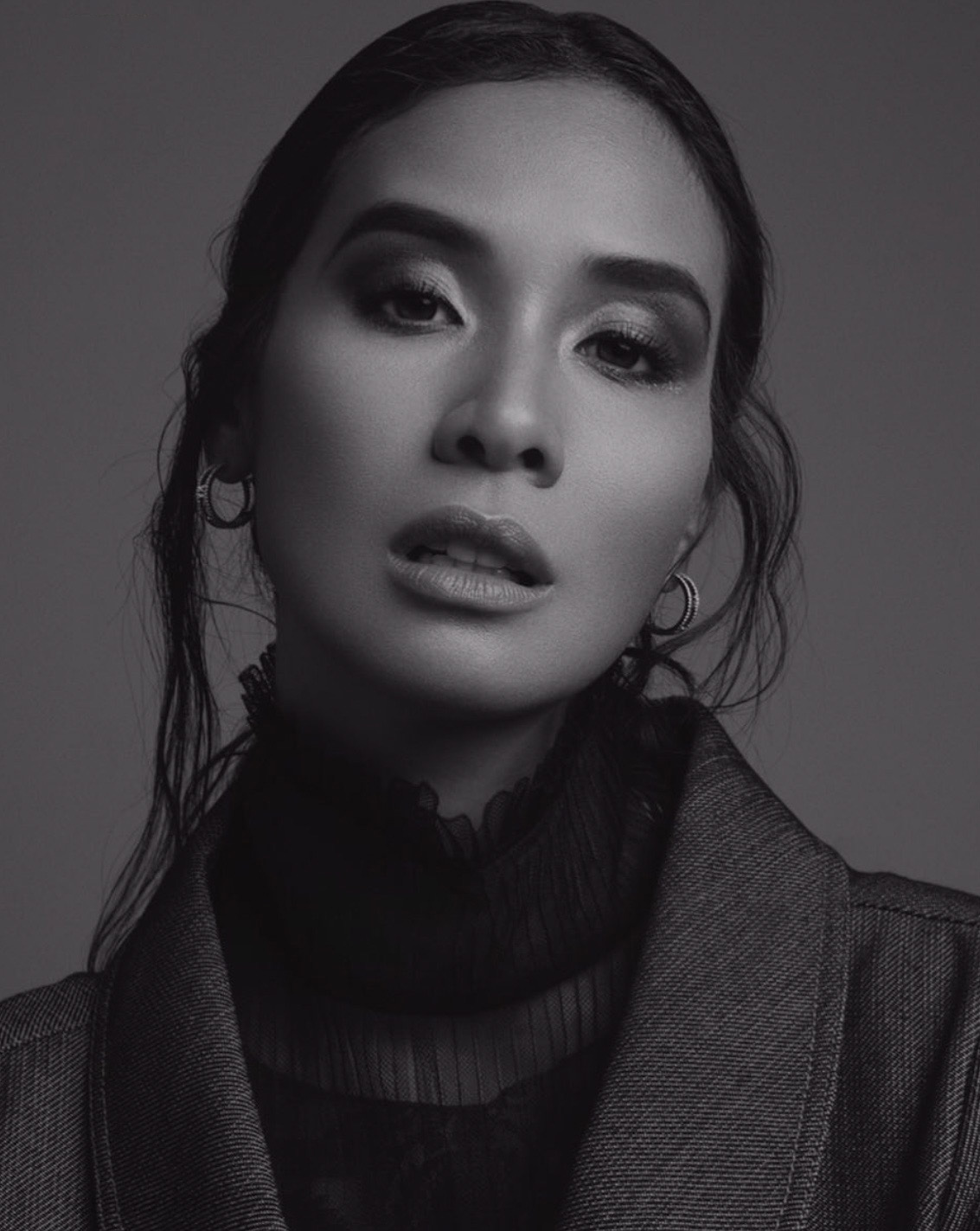
- Timothy in 2013
- Born: 8 January 1979 (age 47); Jakarta, Indonesia
- Occupations: Actress; model; director
- Years active: 2002—present
- Spouse: Vino G. Bastian (m. 2012)
- Children: 1

Marsha Timothy (born 8 January 1979) is an Indonesian actress and model. She is known for starring as the titular role in Marlina the Murderer in Four Acts (2017).

== Early life ==
Marsha Timothy was born on 8 January 1979, the youngest of six children of record executive Eugene Timothy and Erna Hoekwater-Timothy.

In 2002, Timothy was scouted by an advertising agency representative at Plaza Indonesia and asked to attend a casting. She then was chosen as the model of beauty product brand Pond's.

== Career ==
Timothy rose to prominence after starring as an archeologist, Sandhika in her acting debut, Ekspedisi Madewa in 2006. In 2007, Timothy starred opposite Gary Iskak in drama film Merah Itu Cinta. For her performance in the film, she received a nomination for Citra Award for Best Actress. She starred as Talyda in Joko Anwar's The Forbidden Door in 2009. In 2015, Timothy starred as a housewife diagnosed with AIDS, Nada, in drama film Nada Untuk Asa. She was nominated for Citra Award for Best Actress for her performance in the film.

In 2017, she starred as the titular role in thriller film Marlina the Murderer in Four Acts. It had its world premiere at the 2017 Cannes Film Festival during the Directors' Fortnight section. For her performance, she won the Best Actress award at the 2017 Sitges Film Festival. She then won the Citra Award for Best Actress for her performance in the film at the 2018 Indonesian Film Festival. In 2022, she starred in a film adaptation of 1996 soap opera The Red Point of Marriage as Ambarwati. Her performance in the film garnered her a fourth nomination for the Citra Award for Best Actress.

== Personal life ==
In October 2012, Timothy married fellow actor Vino G. Bastian in Jakarta. She later gave birth to their daughter, Jizzy, in July 2013.

== Filmography ==
=== Film ===
Year	Title	Role	Notes
2006	Ekspedisi Madewa	Sandhika	
2007	Coklat Stroberi	Citra	
2007	Merah itu Cinta	Raisa	
2008	Otomatis Romantis	Nadia	
2008	In the Name of Love	Young Citra	
2008	Love	Adult Tia	
2008	From Bandung with Love	Vega	
2008	Cinta Setaman	Nilina	Segment: "Wa'alaikum Salam"
2009	The Forbidden Door	Talyda Sasongko	
2010	Naruto Bersyukur	—N/a	Short film As director
2011	Khalifah	Khalifah	
2011	Belkibolang	Nuri	Segment: "Percakapan Ini"
2011	Oh Tidak..!	Meisya	
2012	Ritual	Wife	
2013	Tampan Tailor	Prita	
2013	Air Mata Terakhir Bunda	Lauren	
2014	The Raid 2	Dwi	
2015	Nada Untuk Asa	Nada	
2015	Toba Dreams	Andini	
2017	Marlina the Murderer in Four Acts	Marlina	
2018	Run to the Beach	Uci	
2018	212 Warrior	Bidadari Angin Timur	
2019	Glorious Days	Adult Vina	
2020	The Ex-Lover Shop	Laras	
2020	Asih 2	Sylvia	
2021	Surga Yang Tak Dirindukan 3	Meirose	
2022	Miracle in Cell No. 7	Juwita	
2022	The Red Point of Marriage	Ambarwati	
2022	Qodrat	Yasmin	
2022	The Big 4	Lady Zero	
2023	Fireworks	Sukma	
2023	Monster	Murni	
2024	Titip Surat untuk Tuhan	Utari	
2024	Kang Mak from Pee Mak	Sari	
2024	My Annoying Brother	Cik Riyana	
2025	Qodrat 2	Yasmin	

=== Television ===
Year	Title	Role	Network	Notes
2007	Jomblo	Adilah	RCTI	
2011	Calon Bini	Nurlela	SCTV	
2021	Antares	Teacher	WeTV	
2022	Menolak Talak	Natasha Aryapura	ANTV	
2023	Sabtu Bersama Bapak	Itje Kusmana Syaifullah	Amazon Prime Video	

=== Stage ===
Year	Production	Role	Location	Ref.
2017	Perempuan-Perempuan Chairil	Ida Nasution	Teater Jakarta, Taman Ismail Marzuki, Jakarta; 11–12 November 2017	
2018	Bunga Penutup Abad	Nyai Ontosoroh	Teater Jakarta, Taman Ismail Marzuki, Jakarta; 17–18 November 2018	
2019	Cinta Tak Pernah Sederhana	Perempuan Hawa	Teater Jakarta, Taman Ismail Marzuki, Jakarta; 16–17 March 2019	
2020	Aku, Istri Munir	Prologuist	Virtual; 10 October 2020	
2021	Seperti Dendam, Rindu Harus Dibayar Tuntas	—N/a	As producer Virtual; 19 November 2021	
2022	Teater Musikal Inggit Garnasih: Tegak Setelah Ombak	—N/a	As producer Ciputra Artpreneur, Jakarta; 20–21 May 2022	
2022	Tamu Agung	Marwoto's wife	Ciputra Artpreneur, Jakarta; 17–18 June 2022	
2023	Ke Pelukan Orang-Orang Tercinta	Fransisca Fanggidaej	Teater Salihara, Jakarta; 16 December 2023	
