= Aurora Ribero =

Indonesian actress (born 2004)

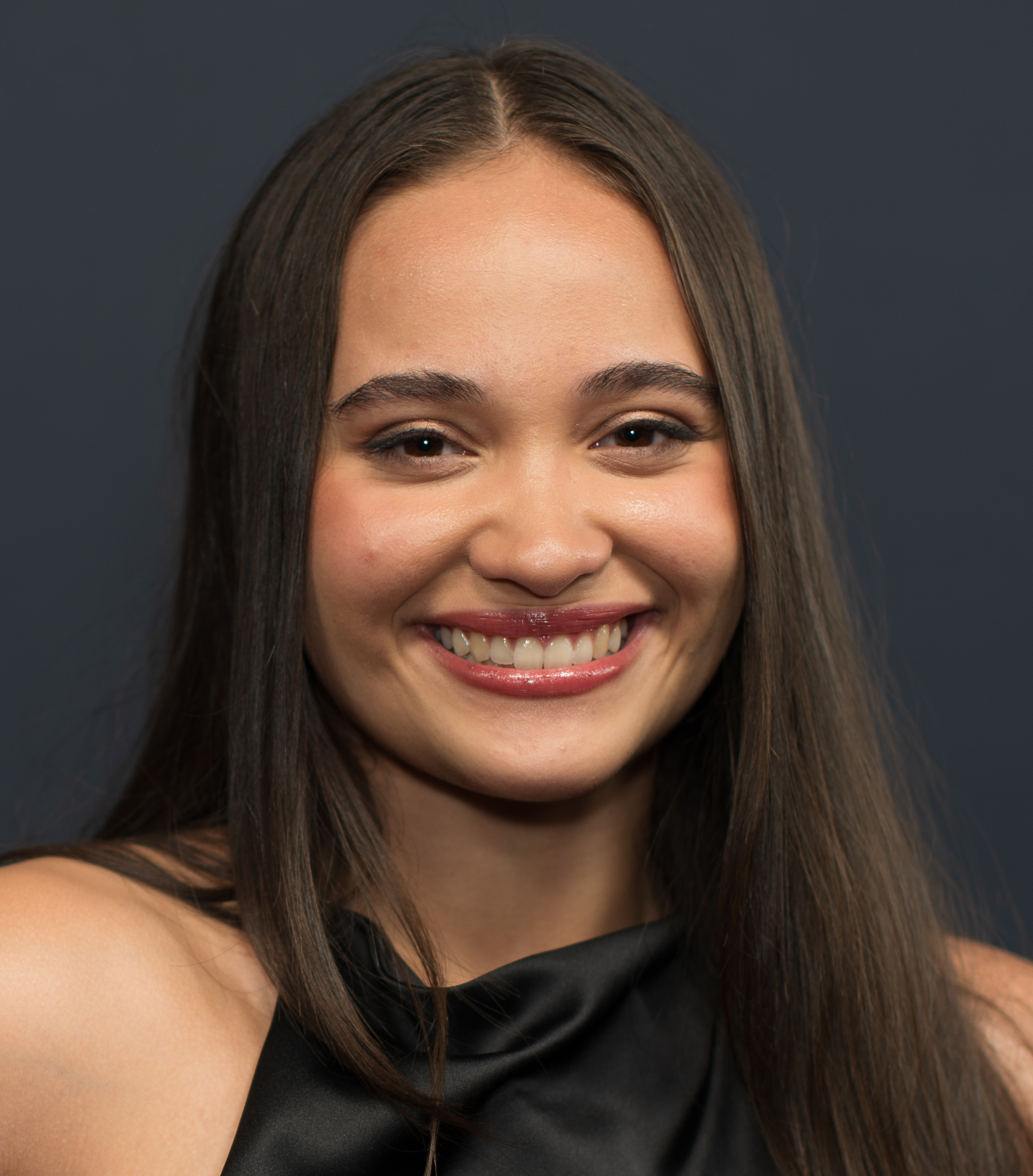
- Ribero in 2024
- Born: Jennifer Aurora Ribero; 18 May 2004 (age 22); Semarang, Central Java, Indonesia
- Occupations: Actress; model; singer
- Years active: 2017–present
- Agent: Bentuk Management
- Musical career
- Genre: Pop
- Instrument: Vocal

Jennifer Aurora Ribero (born 18 May 2004) is an Indonesian actress, model, and singer of Italian & Javanese descent. She made her acting debut in Ernest Prakasa's 2017 film Susah Sinyal. She has also starred in the 2024 film The Shadow Strays.

== Early life ==
Ribero was born on 18 May 2004 in Semarang, Central Java to an Italian father, Luigi Ribero, and a Javanese mother, Sri Hartito Natalia Harun from Gorontalo, Indonesia.

== Career ==
Ribero started her career as a model in Bali. She also once became an extra in a web series. In 2017, Ribero was selected as an actress and made her debut in the world of acting through the film Susah Sinyal directed by Ernest Prakasa. Ribero as the main character collided with actress, Adinia Wirasti. Due to her role in the film, she was nominated for two awards in 2018 by Indonesian Box Office Movie Awards in the category of "Best Supporting Actress" and by the Maya Awards in the category of "Best New Actress".

In 2018, Ribero starred in a youth drama film R: Raja, Ratu & Rahasia which was adapted from the novel of the same name by Wulanfadi as the main character. At the end of the year, Ribero starred in the film "Asal Kau Bahagia". She was chosen as the main character to play a character named Aurora, in which in the film she is required to play a character 4 years older than her age.

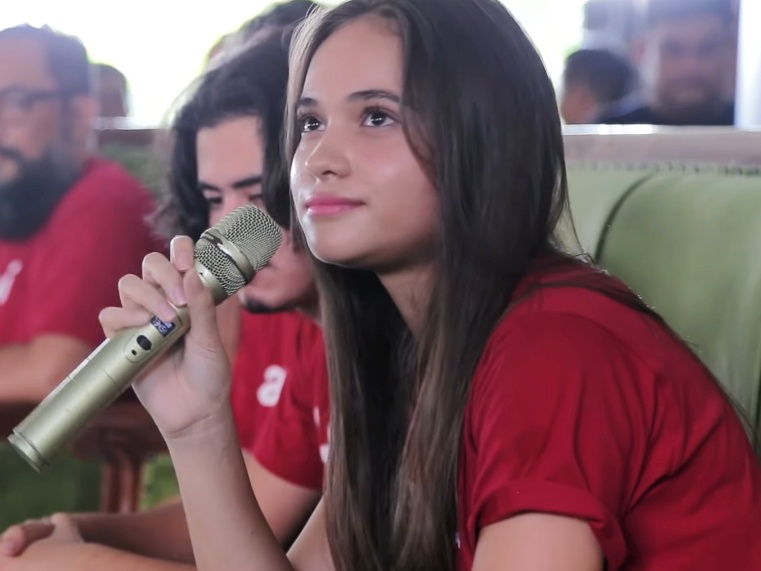
Ribero during the promotion of the Asal Kau Bahagia

In September 2019, Ribero starred in a big screen film Warkop DKI Reborn 3, a new version of Warkop DKI Reborn which is presented with a new cast line-up. She was lined up as the female lead or called Warkop Angel to play a character named Aisyah. In the same month, she starred in a web series for the first time. She was lined up to star in the original Vidio web series Heart, which was adapted from the 2006 Indonesian film with the same title. Ribero plays the character Luna which in the film version is played by Acha Septriasa.

In 2020, Ribero returned to play a role in the sequel to the Warkop Reborn 3 film, Warkop DKI Reborn 4. However, due to the impact of the COVID-19 pandemic, the film was distributed via a video service on demand Disney+ Hotstar. In October, Aurora starred in a Netflix original film, Love Like the Falling Rain, which was adapted from the novel of the same name by Boy Candra. She was also required to learn dance to deepen her character for the film.

In 2021, Ribero starred in the first original KlikFilm film, titled Tentang Rindu. She was chosen as the main character to play Rindu, an Italian food cook. She was also starred in the Netflix original film Ali & Ratu Ratu Queens as Eva. In 2021, Aurora is more involved in web series projects. Aurora has played a role in five web series titles, such as Sosmed, Dunia Maya and Kaget Nikah as the main characters and Angkringan the Series and Susah Sinyal the Series as supporting roles.

== Filmography ==
=== Film ===
Key
†	Denotes productions that have not yet been released

Year	Title	Role	Notes	Ref.
2017	Susah Sinyal	Kiara Tirtoatmodjo	Debut	
2018	R: Raja, Ratu & Rahasia	Ratu Amara Erinska		
2018	Asal Kau Bahagia	Aurora		
2019	The Woven Path: Perempuan Tana Humba	Narrator	Short film	
2019	Sin	Aurora	Short film	
2019	Warkop DKI Reborn 3	Aisyah		
2020	Warkop DKI Reborn 4	Aisyah		
2020	Love Like the Falling Rain	Nara Senja		
2021	Tentang Rindu	Rindu		
2021	Ali & Ratu Ratu Queens	Eva		
2022	Like & Share	Lisa	Also writer	
2024	Dua Garis Biru	Lisa		
2024	The Shadow Strays	13, Nomi		
2025	Samar	Elsa, Elsa Nirmala		
2025	Komang (film)	Komang, Komang Ade Widiandari		
2025	Pembantaian Dukun Santet	Annisa		
2026	Nobody Loves Kay	Amanda		
TBA	Keluarga Slamet †	Clara		
TBA	Project: Golgotha †			

=== Web series ===
Year	Title	Role	Notes	Ref.
2019	Heart	Luna		
2021	Sosmed	Nadya		
2021	Angkringan the Series	Ratu		
2021	Dunia Maya	Maya Sonia		
2021	Susah Sinyal the Series	Kiara	3 episodes	
2021–2022	Kaget Nikah	Lalita		
2023	Generasi D'Bijis †			

=== Television series ===
Year	Title	Role	Notes	Ref.
2022	Siapa Takut Orang Ketiga	Kimi		

== Discography ==
=== Extended play ===
Title	Details
Susah Sinyal (Original Motion Picture Soundtrack)	Release date: 21 December 2017; Label: Sony Music Entertainment; Format: CD, digital download

=== Single ===
==== As lead artist ====
List of singles as lead artist, with selected chart positions and certifications, showing year released and album name
Title	Year	Album
"Thinkin' Bout U"	2018	Single non-album
"Never Look Back"	2021	Ali & Ratu Ratu Queens (Original Soundtrack)

==== As featured artist ====
List of singles as featured artist, with selected chart positions and certifications, showing year released and album name
Title	Year	Album
"Talked Too Much" (Febri Wiratama featuring Aurora Ribero)	2017	Single non-album
"Till We Meet Again" (Alffy Rev featuring Aurora Ribero)	2021	Single non-album

==== Promotional singles ====
Title	Year	Album
"Untuk Mama"	2017	Susah Sinyal (Original Motion Picture Soundtrack)

== Awards and nominations ==
Year	Award	Category	Work	Result	Ref.
2018	Indonesian Box Office Movie Awards	Best Supporting Actress	Susah Sinyal	Nominated	
2019	Maya Awards	Best New Actress	Susah Sinyal	Nominated	
2022	Tempo Film Festival	Best Actress	Like & Share	Nominated	
2023	Maya Awards	Best Actress in a Leading Role	Like & Share	Nominated	
