= 30 Hari Mencari Cinta =

30 hari mencari cinta
- Directed by: Upi Avianto
- Produced by: Erwin Arnada, Dimas Djayadiningrat
- Starring: Maria Agnes, Dinnia Olivia, Nirina Zubir
- Edited by: Dewi S. Alibasah
- Music by: Andi Rianto
- Distributed by: Rexcinema Production
- Release date: January 9, 2004
- Country: Indonesia
- Language: Indonesian

30 Hari Mencari Cinta (roughly translated as "Looking For Love in 30 Days") is a 2004 Indonesian romantic comedy film drama directed by Upi Avianto and starring Maria Agnes. Music for the film was composed by Andi Rianto.

== Plot ==
The story begins with three close friends — Keke (Dinna Olivia), Gwen (Nirina Zubir), and Olin (Maria Agnes) — who share a rented house. One afternoon they relax at a café and meet their neighbor Bono (Revaldo), who works there. They then notice Barbara (Luna Maya) and her friends accompanied by two male companions, which makes them jealous. After hanging out at the café they shop for household necessities at a supermarket and talk about how Barbara is acting very differently than usual, then they buy a Titanic VCD at a CD shop to watch at home.

One night, while Keke, Gwen and Olin watch the film, they are touched and moved. They realize, after a long time, that they have neglected something very important: love. The only man they really know is Bono. Because they always go everywhere together without male companions, Barbara and her friends nickname them “The Lesbians,” which provokes Gwen: she refuses to accept it and immediately punches Barbara in the face. For that reason they decide to find boyfriends. They visit the busiest nightclub but don’t find suitable partners, until Keke proposes a bet to find love within 30 days; the winner will be served by the loser forever. Olin and Gwen immediately agree to Keke’s bet.

The three begin searching for men everywhere — at the gym, in the library, and at the supermarket. They even ask Bono to introduce his friends to them, and they grow envious when they see couples dating nearby. Over time, Bono is fired from the café after a complaint from Barbara, and Olin watches as Keke is picked up by her boyfriend Brian (Agastya Kandou) to go see a movie. Meanwhile, Olin meets Erik (Vino G. Bastian) at the CD shop; he is attentive to her. That night Olin and Keke talk about their partners, leaving Gwen single and very annoyed.

Brian takes Keke to his house to talk about how they should have sex before entering a serious, committed relationship, which makes Keke uneasy. Olin brings Erik to a salon for a hair treatment and is delighted by Erik’s attentiveness. While sitting alone at the café without Keke and Olin, Gwen runs into her ex, Axel (Rionaldo Stockhorst), who is caught by Bono (now working at the CD shop) stealing. Gwen and Axel go to a billiards hall to discuss the past and how they have changed. That evening at home Keke is surprised by Gwen’s changed appearance and by Gwen’s return with Axel, but Gwen insists Axel has changed and teases Keke for being afraid of losing the bet; then Gwen goes to Axel’s band rehearsal place. As time passes, the three of them spend time with their respective partners.

The next day, Brian calls Gwen while she’s relaxing at home and flatters her with sweet talk. Keke is furious seeing Gwen flattered by Brian’s lines, straining their friendship. That night Olin wants to kiss Erik, but Erik avoids it, leaving Olin embarrassed and awkward, while Gwen and Bono hear and see the noisy sound of Axel’s band in Bono’s yard. The following day Brian comes to pick up Keke while Olin is cleaning the house, but Brian proceeds to flirt with Olin by teaching her how to kiss and body language, angering Keke who witnesses them. Olin, saddened, is scolded by Gwen for not telling Gwen directly about what happened, further straining their friendship.

On day 30, Keke secretly buys condoms at the supermarket in preparation for having sex with Brian and runs into Bono, who is working as a cashier. That same day Olin and Gwen dress up to meet their partners. That evening Olin asks Erik for clarity about their relationship; Erik apologizes and rejects Olin because Erik is homosexual, leaving Olin deeply disappointed and hurt. At Brian’s house, Keke becomes anxious and unsettled by Brian’s strong libido and keeps running to the bathroom; there she overhears Brian calling Olin naive and timid, making Keke realize Brian is only interested in her body. Feeling that her friendship with Gwen and Olin has become strained because of her assumptions, Keke immediately leaves Brian. At the café, Gwen waits for Axel for hours and eventually goes home; when Axel finally arrives, Gwen is so disappointed she feels he will never change or understand her feelings, and she leaves him in frustration.

Back at home, the three reflect until Olin sobs uncontrollably. Hearing Olin’s sobs, Gwen and Keke comfort her and share their own sadness over their partners’ behavior. They reconcile and agree at the café that men do not guarantee their happiness and that their friendship will not be ruined by men. The film ends with Gwen, Keke and Olin having fun at a nightclub until three handsome guys approach them.

== Cast ==
- Maria Agnes as Olin
- Vino G. Bastian as Erik
- Luna Maya as Barbara
- Dinna Olivia as Keke
- Revaldo as Bono
- Rionaldo Stockhorst as Axel
- Nirina Zubir as Gwen
