= The Clerics =

2013 film

- Film poster
- Indonesian: Sang Kiai
- Directed by: Rako Prijanto
- Written by: Anggoro
- Starring: Christine Hakim
- Release date: 30 May 2013
- Running time: 136 minutes
- Country: Indonesia
- Language: Indonesian

The Clerics (Indonesian: Sang Kiai) is a 2013 Indonesian drama film directed by Rako Prijanto. The film follows the Muslim cleric and founder of Indonesian Islamic organization Nahdlatul Ulama, Hasyim Asy'ari through the Japanese occupation of the Dutch East Indies and the Indonesian National Revolution. The film was selected as the Indonesian entry for the Best Foreign Language Film at the 86th Academy Awards, but it was not nominated.

== Cast ==
- Ikranagara as Hasyim Asy'ari
- Christine Hakim as Nyai Kapu
- Adipati Koesmadji as Harun
- Agus Kuncoro as Wahid Hasyim
- Boy Permana as Karim Hasyim
- Dayat Simbaia as Yusuf Hasyim
- Bung Toni as Sutomo
- Ahmad Zidan as young Abdurrahman Wahid
- Imam Wibowo and Agung Wibowo as Sukarno
- Tabah Helmi Nonaka as Lieutenant general Kumakichi Harada
- Andrew Trigg as Aubertin Walter Sothern Mallaby

== See also ==
- List of submissions to the 86th Academy Awards for Best Foreign Language Film
- List of Indonesian submissions for the Academy Award for Best Foreign Language Film
