= Joe Taslim =

Indonesian actor and martial artist (born 1981)

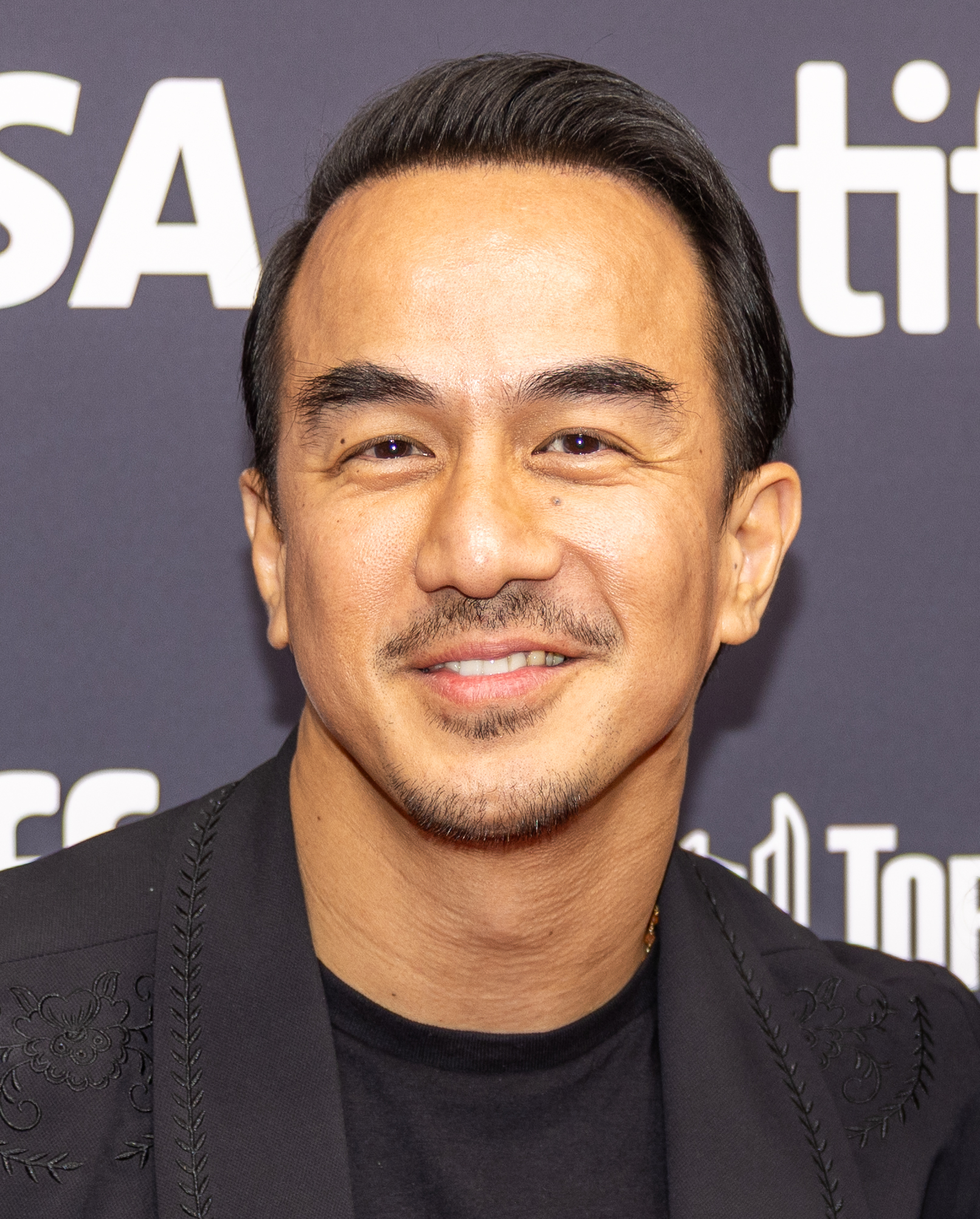
- Taslim in 2025
- Born: Johannes Taslim; 23 June 1981 (age 45); Palembang, South Sumatra, Indonesia
- Occupations: Actor; martial artist; model
- Years active: 1997–present
- Judo career
- Country: Indonesia
- Weight class: ‍–‍81 kg, ‍–‍73 kg
- Rank: Black belt
Medal record
Men's judo
Representing Indonesia
SEA Games
Bronze medal – third place	2001 Kuala Lumpur	‍–‍81 kg
Bronze medal – third place	2005 Manila	‍–‍73 kg
Silver medal – second place	2007 Nakhon Ratchasima	‍–‍81 kg
Pekan Olahraga Nasional
Gold medal – first place	2008 Samarinda	‍–‍81 kg
Southeast Asia Judo Championships
Gold medal – first place	1999 Singapore	Free

Profile at external judo databases
- JudoInside.com: 60277

Johannes Taslim (born 23 June 1981) is an Indonesian actor, martial artist, and model. He was a member of Indonesia's national judo team from 1997 to 2009, becoming a three-time medalist (one Silver and two Bronze) at the Southeast Asian Games, and a Gold medalist at the 2008 Pekan Olahraga Nasional.

His film acting roles include Sergeant Jaka in The Raid (2011), Jah in Fast & Furious 6 (2013), Manas in Star Trek Beyond (2016), and Sub-Zero in Mortal Kombat (2021) and Mortal Kombat II (2026). He is also known for his role as Li Yong in the historical action drama television series Warrior (2019–‍2023).

== Early life ==
Taslim was born in Palembang, Indonesia, to a Christian family of Chinese descent. He began studying martial arts from a young age, and cites Japanese judoka Kosei Inoue and Tadahiro Nomura as inspirations. He has also practiced taekwondo, pencak silat and wushu.

== Judo ==
Taslim was a member of Indonesia's national judo team from 1997 to 2009. In 1999, he won a Gold medal at the Southeast Asia Judo Championships in Singapore, in the Men's Free Class. He was a Bronze medalist at the 2001 and 2005 Southeast Asian Games, and a Silver medalist at the 2007 Games. He won a Gold medal in the Men –81 kg class at the 2008 Indonesia National Games. He retired from active competition in 2009.

== Film career ==
Prior to his film debut, Taslim worked as a model in print ads and commercials. He made his acting debut in the 2008 film Karma.

In 2010, he won the role of Jaka, a sergeant in a special police squad, in the award-winning The Raid, after a series of fight auditions and reading.

Following The Raid, Taslim took part in HBO Asia's first action horror film, Dead Mine, which had a theatrical release in selected Asian territories in September 2012, followed by exclusive television premieres across the HBO Asia network.

Taslim appeared in the feature film Fast & Furious 6 (2013), as the villainous Jah, a mercenary who uses his martial arts to fight two of the film's protagonists, Roman Pearce (Tyrese Gibson) and Han Seoul-Oh (Sung Kang).

In May 2013, it was reported that Taslim would star in the action thriller The Night Comes for Us. In September 2014, pre-production on the film was halted and the script was instead adapted as a graphic novel. The film was eventually released by Netflix on 19 October 2018.

In 2016, he played an antagonist character, Manas, a former first officer of Captain Balthazar Edison (played by Idris Elba), Anderson Le, turned into an alien in Star Trek Beyond.

In 2017, Taslim was cast in the role of Li Yong in the Cinemax action series, Warrior. He played Li Yong, a Long Zii enforcer and secretly Mai Ling's lover. His character serves as a rival to the series' protagonist Ah Sahm. The series premiered on 5 April 2019.

In July 2019, Taslim was cast as Bi-Han / Sub-Zero in the Mortal Kombat reboot. The film premiered in April 2021 in theaters and on HBO Max. Taslim then reprised the role in the sequel Mortal Kombat II, with the character coming back as Noob Saibot.

== Personal life ==
Taslim married his wife, Julia, in 2004, and they have three children.

== Filmography ==
=== Film ===
Key
†	Denotes films that have not yet been released

Year	Title	Role	Notes
2008	Karma	Armand Guan	
2009	Rasa	Allivan	
2011	The Raid	Sergeant Jaka	
2012	Dead Mine	Djoko	
2013	Fast & Furious 6	Jah	Hollywood debut film
2013	La Tahzan	Yamada	
2014	The Raid 2	Sergeant Jaka	Uncredited, archive footage
2016	Star Trek Beyond	Anderson Le / Manas	
2017	A Note to God	Martin	
2018	The Night Comes for Us	Ito	
2019	Hit & Run	Tegar Satria	
2020	The Swordsman	Gurutai	
2021	Mortal Kombat	Bi-Han / Sub-Zero	
2025	The Furious	Navin	
2026	Mortal Kombat II	Bi-Han / Noob Saibot	
TBA	Extraction 3 †		

=== Television ===
Year	Title	Role	Network	Notes
2019–2023	Warrior	Li Yong	Cinemax, Max	Main cast
2023	Blindspotting	Mustafa	Starz	Episode: "Karate Kiss"

== Sport achievements ==
Year	Event	Sport	Division	Result	Ref(s).
1999	Southeast Asia Judo Championships Singapore	Judo	Men Free Class	1st place, gold medalist(s)	
2001	Southeast Asian Games	Judo	Men –81 kg	3rd place, bronze medalist(s)	–
2005	Southeast Asian Games	Judo	Men –73 kg	3rd place, bronze medalist(s)	–
2007	Southeast Asian Games	Judo	Men –81 kg	2nd place, silver medalist(s)	
2008	Indonesia National Games XVII	Judo	Men –81 kg	1st place, gold medalist(s)	

== Awards and nominations ==
Year	Organization	Award	Nominated work	Result	Ref.
2013	Maya Awards	Best Actor in a Leading Role	La Tahzan	Nominated	
2013	Indonesian Film Festival	Citra Award for Best Leading Actor	La Tahzan	Nominated	
2014	Indonesian Movie Actors Awards	Best Actor	La Tahzan	Won	
2014	Indonesian Movie Actors Awards	Favourite Actor	La Tahzan	Nominated	
2015	Indonesia Kids' Choice Awards	Favorite Actor	Himself	Won	
2016	APAN Star Awards	Best APAN Star Award	Himself	Won	
2016	Infotainment Awards	Indonesian Celebrity of World Achievement	Himself	Nominated	
2017	Style Awards	Actor of the Year	Himself	Won	
2026	Critics' Choice Super Awards	Best Actor in an Action Movie	The Furious	Nominated	
