= What They Don't Talk About When They Talk About Love =

2013 Indonesian drama film

- Film poster
- Yang Tidak Dibicarakan Ketika Membicarakan Cinta
- Directed by: Mouly Surya
- Written by: Mouly Surya
- Produced by: Rama Adi; Fauzan Zidni; Tia Hasibuan; Parama Wirasmo
- Starring: Nicholas Saputra; Ayushita; Karina Salim
- Cinematography: Yunus Pasolang
- Edited by: Kelvin Nugroho
- Music by: Zeke Khaseli; Yudhi Arfani
- Production companies: Cinesurya; Amalina Pictures
- Distributed by: Cinesurya
- Release dates: January 19, 2013 (Sundance); May 2, 2013 (Indonesia)
- Running time: 104 minutes
- Country: Indonesia
- Language: Indonesian

What They Don't Talk About When They Talk About Love (Indonesian: Yang Tidak Dibicarakan Ketika Membicarakan Cinta, stylized in all lowercase) is a 2013 Indonesian drama film written and directed by Mouly Surya. The film stars Nicholas Saputra, Ayushita, and Karina Salim as teenagers involved in a complex relationship while dealing with their disabilities.

== Plot ==
Diana and Fitri are two visually impaired teenage girls. Diana is myopic, meaning she can see things only an inch in front of her, while Fitri has been blind since birth. They both experience the pangs and yearnings of love, but must transcend their lack of sight to envision it. It's a struggle as they grapple to understand and fathom what they feel through other senses: touch, sound, and movement. Their missteps causing misconceptions are sometimes heartbreaking but both are gifted with a sublime resilience.

== Cast ==
- Nicholas Saputra as Edo
- Ayushita as Fitri
- Karina Salim as Diana
- Anggun Priambodo as Andhika
- Lupita Jennifer as Maya
- Adella Fauzi as Tiara
- Khiva Iskak as Lukman
- Tutie Kirana as Diana' mother
- Anindya Krisna as Reni
- Jajang C. Noer as Edo's mother

== Production ==
Production of the film was funded by grants received from the Gothenburg Film Festival, Asian Project Market of the Busan International Film Festival, and Hubert Bals Fund of the International Film Festival Rotterdam.

== Release ==
The film premiered in the World Dramatic Competition category of the 2013 Sundance Film Festival, making history as the first Indonesian film to do so. Domestically, it received limited release in May 2013. Throughout 2013, the film was screened at several prestigious film festivals, including the International Film Festival Rotterdam, Hong Kong International Film Festival, and Busan International Film Festival.

== Reception ==
=== Box office ===
At the time of its domestic release, the film was only shown in 14 theaters and performed poorly at the box office.

=== Critical response ===
The film received positive reviews from critics. Writing for The Hollywood Reporter, Duane Byrge called it a "touching and brilliantly envisioned story of a young, nearly blind teen's first love" and singled out Zeke Khaseli's score for highlighting "the character’s emotional struggles." Fransisca Bianca of the Whiteboard Journal wrote "the film truly explores things that are not talked when we talk about love" while praising the film for "its bravery in introducing a new form of romance through its cinematography and unique love story."

== Awards and nominations ==
Year	Awards	Category	Recipients	Results	Ref.
2013	Sundance Film Festival	World Cinema Grand Jury Prize	What They Don't Talk About When They Talk About Love	Nominated	
2013	International Film Festival Rotterdam	Lions Film Award	What They Don't Talk About When They Talk About Love	Nominated	
2013	International Film Festival Rotterdam	NETPAC Award	What They Don't Talk About When They Talk About Love	Won	
2013	Cinemanila International Film Festival	Lino Brocka Award for Best Film	What They Don't Talk About When They Talk About Love	Nominated	
2013	Hong Kong International Film Festival	Golden Firebird Award	Mouly Surya	Nominated	
2013	Hong Kong International Film Festival	FIPRESCI Award	Mouly Surya	Nominated	
2013	7th Jogja-NETPAC Asian Film Festival	Golden Hanoman Award	Mouly Surya	Nominated	
2013	33rd Citra Awards	Best Supporting Actress	Ayushita	Nominated	
2013	33rd Citra Awards	Best Original Screenplay	Mouly Surya	Nominated	
2013	2nd Maya Awards	Best Feature Film	What They Don't Talk About When They Talk About Love	Nominated	
2013	2nd Maya Awards	Best Director	Mouly Surya	Won	
2013	2nd Maya Awards	Best Actress in a Supporting Role	Ayushita	Won	
2013	2nd Maya Awards	Best New Actor	Anggun Priambodo	Nominated	
2013	2nd Maya Awards	Best New Actress	Karina Salim	Nominated	
2013	2nd Maya Awards	Best Original Screenplay	Mouly Surya	Nominated	
2013	2nd Maya Awards	Best Cinematography	Yunus Pasolang	Won	
2013	2nd Maya Awards	Best Sound	Khikmawan Santosa	Nominated	
2013	2nd Maya Awards	Best Original Score	Zeke Khaselli; Yudhi Arfani	Nominated	
2013	Asia-Pacific Film Festival	Best Music	Zeke Khaselli; Yudhi Arfani	Won	
2014	8th Asian Film Awards	Best Composer	Zeke Khaselli; Yudhi Arfani	Nominated	
2014	Indonesian Film Academy Awards	Best Film	What They Don't Talk About When They Talk About Love	Won	
2014	Indonesian Film Academy Awards	Best Director	Mouly Surya	Won	
2014	Indonesian Film Academy Awards	Best Screenplay	Mouly Surya	Won	
2014	Las Palmas Film Festival	Best New Director	Mouly Surya	Won	
2014	Indonesian Movie Awards	Best Actor	Nicholas Saputra	Nominated	
2014	Indonesian Movie Awards	Best Actress	Ayushita	Won	
2014	Indonesian Movie Awards	Best New Actress	Karina Salim	Won	
2014	Indonesian Movie Awards	Best Chemistry	Nicholas Saputra & Ayushita	Won	
2014	Indonesian Movie Awards	Favorite Actor	Nicholas Saputra	Nominated	
2014	Indonesian Movie Awards	Favorite Actress	Ayushita	Nominated	
2014	Indonesian Movie Awards	Favorite New Actress	Karina Salim	Nominated	
2014	Indonesian Movie Awards	Favorite Film	What They Don't Talk About When They Talk About Love	Nominated	
