= Gina S. Noer =

Indonesian filmmaker (born 1985)

- Born: Retna Ginatri S. Noer; 24 August 1985 (age 40); Balikpapan, East Kalimantan, Indonesia
- Education: University of Indonesia
- Occupations: Director; producer; writer; author
- Years active: 2003–present
- Spouse: Salman Aristo (m. 2006)

Gina S. Noer (born 24 August 1985) is an Indonesian screenwriter, film director, producer, and author. She co-founded production company Wahana Kreator Nusantara.

Noer became the first person to win both Best Original Screenplay and Best Adapted Screenplay in the same year at the Indonesian Film Festival for her work on Cemara's Family and Two Blue Stripes during the 39th ceremony.

== Career ==
Noer started her career in 2004 for writing a short film Ladies Room. She wrote her first feature-length film, Angga Dwimas Sasongko's directorial debut film Foto, Kotak Jendela in 2006.

In 2008, she and her husband Salman Aristo adapted Habiburrahman El Shirazy's best-selling novel Verses of Love into a film with the same name, directed by Hanung Bramantyo. She received her first Citra Award nomination for her work on Perempuan Berkalung Sorban for Best Adapted Screenplay at the 2009 Indonesian Film Festival. Along with Ifan A. Ismail, Noer adapted the third President of Indonesia, B. J. Habibie's memoir Habibie & Ainun into a film of the same name. They won the Citra Award for Best Adapted Screenplay at the 2013 Indonesian Film Festival. In 2015, she wrote a book about Habibie's early life, Rudy, Kisah Masa Muda Sang Visioner, which was adapted into a feature film Rudy Habibie a year later. She also wrote the screenplay for the film.

In 2019, She made her directorial debut on teen drama film Two Blue Stripes, starring Angga Yunanda and Adhisty Zara, a then-member of idol group JKT48. She made her producing debut on Cemara's Family during the same year, which garnered her Citra Award nomination for Best Picture. During the same ceremony, Noer made history as the first person to win both Best Original Screenplay and Best Adapted Screenplay in the same year at the Indonesian Film Festival for her work on the two films.

In 2021, she directed, produced and wrote First, Second & Third Love, which became the closing film of the 16th Jogja-NETPAC Asian Film Festival. Her third feature film, Like & Share was released in Indonesian theatres on 8 December 2022. It was also screened at various film festivals, including International Film Festival Rotterdam, South by Southwest, and Adelaide Film Festival. The sequel of Two Blue Stripes, Two Blue Hearts, was released in 2024 with Aisha Nurra Datau replacing Adhisty for the role of Dara. In May 2024, it was announced that Noer would direct a biographical film about the pioneer of education for native Indonesians during the Dutch colonial times, Ki Hajar Dewantara.

== Filmography ==
Film

Year	Title	Writer	Producer	Director	Notes
2006	Foto, Kotak dan Jendela	Yes	No	No	
2006	Lentera Merah	Yes	No	No	
2007	Jelangkung 3	Yes	No	No	
2008	Musik Hati	Yes	No	No	
2008	Verses of Love	Yes	No	No	
2009	Perempuan Berkalung Sorban	Yes	No	No	
2009	Queen Bee	Yes	No	No	
2010	Hari untuk Amanda	Yes	No	No	
2012	Habibie & Ainun	Yes	No	No	
2013	Pintu Harmonika	Yes	No	No	
2015	The Crescent Moon	No	Co-producer	No	
2016	Rudy Habibie	Yes	No	No	
2016	Pinky Promise	Yes	No	No	
2017	Posesif	Yes	No	No	
2018	Run to the Beach	Yes	No	No	
2019	Cemara's Family	Yes	Yes	No	
2019	Two Blue Stripes	Yes	Co-producer	Yes	Directorial debut film
2019	Glorious Days	Yes	No	No	
2021	Ali & Ratu Ratu Queens	Yes	No	No	
2021	First, Second & Third Love	Yes	Yes	Yes	
2022	Like & Share	Yes	Yes	Yes	
2023	Blessed You	Story developer	No	No	
2024	Two Blue Hearts	Yes	Yes	Yes	
2026	Me Before Me	Yes	No	Yes	

Television

Year	Title	Creator	Director	Writer	Network	Notes
2020	Saiyo Sakato	Yes	Yes	Yes	GoPlay	10 episodes
2022	Dapur Napi	Yes	No	No	Vidio	
