= Upi Avianto =

Indonesian film director

- Born: 21 July 1972 (age 53); Indonesia
- Years active: 2003–present

Upi Avianto is an Indonesian screenwriter and film director who has worked on several of Indonesia's most popular films in the 2000s.

She directed the 2004 film 30 Hari Mencari Cinta (30 Days Looking for Love) which founded the film career of actress Nirina Zubir. In 2007 she directed, wrote and produced the hit Coklat Stroberi.

== Filmography ==
=== As screenwriter ===
- Tusuk Jelangkung (2003) (screenplay)
- Lovely Luna (2004)
- 30 Hari Mencari Cinta (2004)
- Realita, Cinta dan Rock'n Roll (2006)
- Coklat Stroberi (2007)
- Shackled (2012)
- Sweet 20 (2017)

=== As director ===
- 30 Hari Mencari Cinta (2004)
- Realita, Cinta dan Rock'n Roll (2006)
- Serigala Terakhir (2009)
- Ada Apa Dengan Monyet (2010)
- Mbah Marijan Ahli G Merapi (2011)
- Shackled (2012)
- My Stupid Boss (2016)
- My Stupid Boss 2 (2019)
- Sri Asih (2022)
- Till Death Do Us Part (2024)

=== As producer ===
- Coklat Stroberi (2007)
- Shackled (2012)

== Awards and nominations ==
| Year | Award | Category | Recipients | Result |
|---|---|---|---|---|
| 2008 | Indonesian Film Festival | Citra Award for Best Director | Radit dan Jani | Nominated |
| 2013 | Indonesian Film Festival | Citra Award for Best Director | Belenggu | Nominated |
| 2016 | Indonesian Film Festival | Citra Award for Best Director | My Stupid Boss | Nominated |

== External links and sources ==
- Upi Avianto at IMDb
