= 2012 Indonesian Movie Awards =

Film industry award ceremony

6th Annual Indonesian Movie Awards
- Date: May 30, 2012
- Location: Tennis Indoor Senayan, Central Jakarta
- Country: Indonesia
- Hosted by: Winky Wiryawan; Prisia Nasution

Television/radio coverage
- Network: RCTI

The 6th Annual Indonesian Movie Awards was held on May 30, 2012, at the Tennis Indoor Senayan, Central Jakarta. The award show was hosted by Winky Wiryawan and Prisia Nasution. And the nominations have been announced for the category of Favorite, which will be chosen by the public via SMS. As for the category of Best, will be selected by a jury that has been appointed. As a guest star who will fill the event, among them Koil, Bondan Prakoso & Fade 2 Black, Yovie & Nuno, Coboy Junior, Penta Boyz, Latinka, etc.

Arisan! 2 leads the nominations with twelve nominations, with Sang Penari and Dilema followed behind with ten and eight nominations each. Contrast with the celebration of Indonesian Movie Awards last year, this year only a handful of films that success to more than four nominations each, while another film only success to bring two or three nominations each.

Sang Penari and Dilema was biggest winner in this ceremonies of taking home three trophies for each film. Other film, Arisan! 2, Lovely Man, and Tendangan dari Langit took home two trophies each, while the other film taking home one trophy each.

== Nominees and winners ==
=== Best ===
Winners are listed first and highlighted in boldface.

Best Actor	Best Actress
**Donny Damara – Lovely Man**; Deddy Mizwar – Kentut; Oka Antara – Sang Penari; Tio Pakusadewo – Dilema; Tora Sudiro – Arisan! 2	**Raihaanun – Lovely Man**; Adinia Wirasti – Jakarta Maghrib; Cut Mini – Arisan! 2; Nani Wijaya – Ummi Aminah; Wulan Guritno – Dilema
Best Supporting Actor	Best Supporting Actress
**Hendro Djarot – Sang Penari**; Abimana Aryasatya – Catatan (Harian) Si Boy; Agus Kuncoro – Tendangan dari Langit; Mathias Muchus – Pengejar Angin; Rio Dewanto – Arisan! 2	**Dewi Irawan – Sang Penari**; Adinia Wirasti – Arisan! 2; Ira Maya Sopha – Simfoni Luar Biasa; Poppy Sovia – Catatan (Harian) Si Boy; Sarah Sechan – Arisan! 2
Best Newcomer Actor	Best Newcomer Actress
**Yosie Kristanto – Tendangan dari Langit**; Axel Andaviar – Masih Bukan Cinta Biasa; Baim Wong – Dilema; Marcell Domits – Batas; Qausar Harta Yudana – Pengejar Angin	**Prisia Nasution – Sang Penari**; Astrid Tiar – Badai di Ujung Negeri; Dinda Hauw – Surat Kecil Untuk Tuhan; Siti Helda Meilita – Pengejar Angin; Tara Basro – Catatan (Harian) Si Boy
Best Chemistry	Special Award: Best Children Role
**Adinia Wirasti and Reza Rahadian – Jakarta Maghrib**; Donny Damara and Raihaanun – Lovely Man; Prisia Nasution and Oka Antara – Sang Penari; Rio Dewanto and Surya Saputra – Arisan! 2; Wulan Guritno and Pevita Pearce – Dilema	**Yudi Miftahudin – Serdadu Kumbang**; Emir Mahira – Garuda di Dadaku 2; Monica Sayangbati – Serdadu Kumbang; Savey M Billah – Semesta Mendukung; Vicky Putra – Simfoni Luar Biasa

=== Favorite ===
Winners are listed first and highlighted in boldface.

Favorite Actor	Favorite Actress
**Tio Pakusadewo – Dilema**; Deddy Mizwar – Kentut; Donny Damara – Lovely Man; Oka Antara – Sang Penari; Tora Sudiro – Arisan! 2	**Wulan Guritno – Dilema**; Adinia Wirasti – Jakarta Maghrib; Cut Mini – Arisan! 2; Nani Wijaya – Ummi Aminah; Raihaanun – Lovely Man
Favorite Supporting Actor	Favorite Supporting Actress
**Rio Dewanto – Arisan! 2**; Abimana Aryasatya – Catatan (Harian) Si Boy; Agus Kuncoro – Tendangan dari Langit; Hendro Djarot – Sang Penari; Mathias Muchus – Pengejar Angin	**Sarah Sechan – Arisan! 2**; Adinia Wirasti – Arisan! 2; Dewi Irawan – Sang Penari; Ira Maya Sopha – Simfoni Luar Biasa; Poppy Sovia – Catatan (Harian) Si Boy
Favorite Newcomer Actor	Favorite Newcomer Actress
**Baim Wong – Dilema**; Axel Andaviar – Masih Bukan Cinta Biasa; Marcell Domits – Batas; Qausar Harta Yudana – Pengejar Angin; Yossi Kristanto – Tendangan dari Langit	**Dinda Hauw – Surat Kecil Untuk Tuhan**; Astrid Tiar – Badai di Ujung Negeri; Prisia Nasution – Sang Penari; Siti Helda Meilita – Pengejar Angin; Tara Basro – Catatan (Harian) Si Boy
Favorite Soundtrack	Favorite Film
**"Tendangan Dari Langit" performed by Kotak – Tendangan dari Langit**; "Cubit Cubitan" performed by Slank (featuring Nirina Zubir) – Get Married 3; "Darah Garuda" performed by Super K – Darah Garuda; "I Need You" performed by Ungu – Purple Love; "Pupus" performed by Dewa 19 – Pupus	**Garuda di Dadaku 2**; Arisan! 2; Catatan (Harian) Si Boy; Dilema; Get Married 3; Jakarta Maghrib; Lovely Man; Masih Bukan Cinta Biasa; Pengejar Angin; Sang Penari; Serdadu Kumbang; Tendangan dari Langit

== Film with most nominations and awards ==
=== Most nominations ===
The following film received most nominations:

Nominations	Film
12	Arisan! 2
10	Sang Penari
8	Dilema
7	Catatan (Harian) Si Boy
7	Pengejar Angin
6	Lovely Man
6	Tendangan dari Langit
4	Jakarta Maghrib
3	Masih Bukan Cinta Biasa
3	Serdadu Kumbang
3	Simfoni Luar Biasa
2	Badai di Ujung Negeri
2	Kentut
2	Get Married 3
2	Ummi Aminah

=== Most wins ===
The following film received most nominations:

Awards	Film
3	Sang Penari
3	Dilema
2	Arisan! 2
2	Lovely Man
2	Tendangan dari Langit
