= Tendangan dari Langit =

- Official poster
- Directed by: Hanung Bramantyo
- Screenplay by: Fajar Nugros
- Produced by: Leo Sutanto
- Starring: Yosie Kristanto; Maudy Ayunda; Joshua Suherman; Jordi Onsu; Giorgino Abraham; Agus Kuncoro; Sujiwo Tejo; Yati Surachman; Y.M. Tarzan; Toro Margens
- Cinematography: Faozan Rizal
- Edited by: Cesa David Lukman
- Music by: Tya Subiakto
- Production company: SinemArt Pictures
- Release date: 25 August 2011 (Indonesia)
- Running time: 117 minutes
- Country: Indonesia
- Language: Indonesian

Tendangan dari Langit (Smackdown From the Sky) is a 2011 Indonesian film directed by Hanung Bramantyo. This film stars Yosie Kristanto, Maudy Ayunda, and Joshua Suherman.

== Cast ==
- Yosie Kristanto as Wahyu
- Maudy Ayunda as Indah
- Joshua Suherman as Purnomo
- Jordi Onsu as Mitro
- Giorgino Abraham as Hendro
- Agus Kuncoro as Hasan
- Sujiwo Tejo as Darto
- Yati Surachman as Mrs. Darto
- Y.M. Tarzan as Susilo
- Toro Margens as Gatot
- Natasha Chairani as Melly

Special appearance

- Irfan Bachdim as Irfan Bachdim
- Kim Kurniawan as Kim Kurniawan
- Timo Scheunemann as Timo Scheunemann
- Matias Ibo as Matias Ibo
- Bima Sakti as Bima Sakti

== Production ==
Filming took place at several locations in Malang, including Gajayana Stadium in Gadingasri and Klojen.

== Soundtrack ==
The soundtrack album, Ost. Tendangan Dari Langit, was produced by Warner Music Group and released in 2011. It contains five songs from the film, including the main theme song, "Tendangan Dari Langit", sung by Kotak. "Cinta Jangan Pergi" and "Energi" were also released as singles. Altogether the album contains 24 songs from 12 musical films. Twelve of the songs are sung by Kotak.

== Awards and nominations ==
| Years | Awards | Category | Recipient | Results |
|---|---|---|---|---|
| 2011 | Indonesian Film Festival | Best Film | Tendangan dari Langit | Nominated |
| 2011 | Indonesian Film Festival | Best Director | Hanung Bramantyo | Nominated |
| 2011 | Indonesian Film Festival | Best Male Supporting Actor | Agus Kuncoro | Nominated |
| 2011 | Indonesian Film Festival | Best Sounds | Satrio Budiono & Sutrisno | Nominated |
| 2011 | Indonesian Film Festival | Best Artistic Stylist | Fauzi | Won |
| 2012 | 2012 Indonesian Movie Awards | Best Supporting Actor | Agus Kuncoro | Nominated |
| 2012 | 2012 Indonesian Movie Awards | Best New Actor | Yosie Kristanto | Won |
| 2012 | 2012 Indonesian Movie Awards | Favorite Film | Tendangan dari Langit | Nominated |
| 2012 | 2012 Indonesian Movie Awards | Favorite Supporting Actor | Agus Kuncoro | Nominated |
| 2012 | 2012 Indonesian Movie Awards | Favorite New Actor | Yosie Kristanto | Nominated |
| 2012 | 2012 Indonesian Movie Awards | Favorite Soundtrack | "Tendangan dari Langit" — Kotak | Won |
