= Brownies (film) =

- VCD cover
- Directed by: Hanung Bramantyo
- Written by: Hanung Bramantyo; Salman Aristo; Eric Sasono
- Produced by: Cindy Christina; Novi Christina; Mitzy Christina; Leo Sutanto
- Starring: Marcella Zalianty; Bucek Depp; Philip Jusuf; Arie K. Untung; Luna Maya
- Cinematography: Tommy Jepang
- Edited by: Cesa David Luckmansyah
- Music by: Gigi
- Distributed by: SinemArt
- Release date: 9 December 2004
- Running time: 114 minutes
- Country: Indonesia
- Language: Indonesian

Brownies is a 2004 Indonesian film directed by Hanung Bramantyo. It is about a career woman who falls for an entrepreneur over their mutual love of brownies.

== Plot ==
Mel (Marcella Zalianty) is a young creative director at an advertising agency who is engaged to Joe (Philip Jusuf). However, she catches him having sex with another woman and breaks off their relationship. This devastates Mel, who becomes incapable of bearing the sight of him and destroys their pictures together. For revenge she begins flirting with numerous men. However, her best friend Didi (Elmayana Sabrena) convinces her to not become like Joe.

Didi takes her to a local café, where Are (Bucek Depp), an aspiring novelist, loans books and serves brownies. Although Mel loves eating the chocolate confections, she cannot cook them well; Are, meanwhile, cooks delicious brownies but has not had them since his mother died. The two spend time together and eventually begin falling in love, despite their class differences: Are was once a street child, while Mel has been raised wealthy. They are able to reconcile these differences, and Are gives Mel hints on cooking brownies.

However, Mel continues to have feelings for Joe and, when he invites her to dinner, does not come to Are's birthday; she is later disappointed when Joe reveals that he had intended a business dinner. Not long after Are has finished writing his novel – with Mel as his publicist – Joe says he is willing to break off his relationship with his new fiancée Astrid (Luna Maya) and return to Mel, if Mel can help him break up with her.

Mel tells Are that she cannot come to the launch, which upsets him. Before she can leave for the dinner, Didi accosts her and tells Mel that she has become just like Joe, breaking people's hearts. After several hours contemplating and cooking brownies, Mel decides to go to the launch but arrives after it is over. She goes to a nearby park where they had often dated, hoping to find him. As she sits crying, disappointed at not seeing him, Are comes behind her and the two confess their love, walking away together and sharing a brownie.

== Cast ==
- Marcella Zalianty as Mel
- Phillip Jusuf as Joe
- Elmayana Sabrena as Didie
- Bucek Depp as Are
- Luna Maya as Astrid

== Production ==
For Brownies, director Hanung Bramantyo used high-definition video; according to Bramantyo, it was the first Indonesian films to use the technology. Bramantyo had previously directed several television series and films, but Brownies was his first film meant to be commercial. The title was chosen because Bramantyo liked eating brownies.

Film critic and aspiring screenwriter Salman Aristo, who showed one of his screenplays to Bramantyo at a seminar, was asked to write the screenplay. To do so, Aristo did intensive research into the production of brownies. It was the first time one of his screenplays was used in a film.

Marcella was picked by SinemArt, while Bucek was chosen through casting. The band Gigi provided the soundtrack.

Jose Rizal Manua bookstore, near Taman Ismail Marzuki, served as Are's café. The crew spent Rp. 20 million refurbishing it for the film.

== Release and reception ==
Brownies was released in December 2004.

A review in Republika wrote that the story had nothing special to offer and that the actors were not all giving their prime performances. However, the review praised the film's soundtrack. Leila S. Chudori, reviewing for Tempo magazine, wrote that the plot was strong and acting generally good, but deplored the film's long stretches of dialogue, writing that she "prayed that the screenwriters would learn techniques to edit the dialogue so that the audience could breathe." (Note: Original: "... saya berdoa agar para penulis skenario mulai belajar teknik menyunting dialog yang bikin penonton menghela napas.")

At the 2005 Indonesian Film Festival, Bramantyo won a Citra Award for Best Director with Brownies. Bramantyo went on to produce more commercially viable films such as Get Married (2006) and Ayat-Ayat Cinta (The Verses of Love), both of which were viewed by more than a million people.

== Awards ==
Brownies was nominated for eleven Citra Awards at the 2005 Indonesian Film Festival, winning three.

Award	Year	Category	Recipient	Result
Indonesian Film Festival	2005	Best Film		Nominated
Indonesian Film Festival	2005	Best Director	Hanung Bramantyo	Won
Indonesian Film Festival	2005	Best Screenplay	Hanung Bramantyo, Salman Aristo, Eric Sasono	Nominated
Indonesian Film Festival	2005	Best Leading Actor	Bucek Depp, Arie K Untung	Nominated
Indonesian Film Festival	2005	Best Leading Actress	Marcella Zalianty	Won
Indonesian Film Festival	2005	Best Supporting Actress	Elmayana Sabrenia	Nominated
Indonesian Film Festival	2005	Best Cinematography	Tommy Jepang	Nominated
Indonesian Film Festival	2005	Best Artistic Direction	Eros Eflin	Nominated
Indonesian Film Festival	2005	Best Editing	Cesa David Luckmansyah	Nominated
Indonesian Film Festival	2005	Best Musical Direction	Dewa Budjana	Nominated
Indonesian Film Festival	2005	Best Sound Arrangement	Siti Asifa Nasution	Won
