= ? (2011 film) =

2011 Indonesian film directed by Hanung Bramantyo

- Theatrical release poster
- Directed by: Hanung Bramantyo
- Written by: Titien Wattimena
- Produced by: Celerina Judisari; Hanung Bramantyo
- Starring: Revalina Sayuthi Temat; Reza Rahadian; Agus Kuncoro; Endhita; Rio Dewanto; Hengky Sulaeman
- Cinematography: Yadi Sugandi
- Edited by: Satrio Budiono; Saft Daultsyah
- Music by: Tya Subiakto
- Distributed by: Dapur Film; Mahaka Pictures
- Release date: 7 April 2011
- Running time: 100 minutes
- Country: Indonesia
- Language: Indonesian
- Budget: Rp 5 billion ($600,000)

? (also written Tanda Tanya, meaning Question Mark) is a 2011 Indonesian drama film directed by Hanung Bramantyo. It stars Revalina Sayuthi Temat, Reza Rahadian, Agus Kuncoro, Endhita, Rio Dewanto, and Hengky Sulaeman. The film focuses around Indonesia's religious pluralism, which often results in conflict between different beliefs, represented in a plot that revolves around the interactions of three families, one Buddhist, one Muslim, and one Catholic. After undergoing numerous hardships and the deaths of several family members in religious violence, they are reconciled.

Based on Bramantyo's experiences as a mixed-race child, ? was meant to counter the portrayal of Islam as a "radical religion". Owing to the film's theme of religious pluralism and controversial subject matter, Bramantyo had difficulty finding backing. Eventually, Mahaka Pictures put forth Rp 5 billion ($600,000) to fund the production. Filming began on 5 January 2011 in Semarang.

Released on 7 April 2011, ? was a critical and commercial success: it received favourable reviews and was viewed by more than 550,000 people. Screened internationally, it was nominated for nine Citra Awards at the 2011 Indonesian Film Festival, winning one. Several Indonesian Muslim groups, including the conservative Indonesian Ulema Council and the extremist Islamic Defenders Front, protested against the film because of its pluralist message.

== Plot ==
? focuses on interfaith relations in Indonesia, a country wherein religious conflicts are common, and there is a long history of violence and discrimination against Chinese Indonesians and other minorities. The storyline follows three families living in a village in Semarang, Central Java: the Chinese-Indonesian Buddhist Tan Kat Sun (Hengky Sulaeman) and his son Hendra (Rio Dewanto), the Muslim couple Soleh and Menuk, and the Catholic-convert Rika and her Muslim son Abi.

Sun and Hendra run a Chinese restaurant that serves pork, which is forbidden for Muslims, although the restaurant has many Muslim clients and staff. To ensure good relations with his Muslim employees and customers, Sun uses special utensils for the preparation of pork, which he does not permit to be used for other dishes, and allows his staff time for prayers; he also gives them a holiday during Eid ul-Fitr, the largest Muslim holiday. One of his employees is Menuk, who supports her unemployed husband, Soleh. Rika is Menuk's friend and is involved with the unsuccessful Muslim actor Surya.

Already in his 70s, Sun falls ill and the restaurant is taken over by Hendra, who decides it will serve exclusively pork, alienating their Muslim customers. Hendra comes into conflict with Soleh over Menuk, as Hendra had previously dated her. Menuk becomes increasingly depressed after Soleh tells her that he plans to divorce her, and they are driven apart. Rika feels stressed as a result of how she has been treated by her neighbours and family after converting to Catholicism from Islam; Abi is also facing ostracism. Meanwhile, Surya and Doni are competing for Rika's affections. Surya is upset over his failure to find a good acting job.

Soleh joins the Islamic charitable group Nahdlatul Ulama (NU), hoping to gain confidence. Though he is initially reluctant to protect the security of a church during Christmas Eve, he ends up sacrificing his life when he discovers a bomb has been planted inside the church. He rushes out with the bomb, which explodes outside, killing him but saving the worshippers. Later, Sun dies when the restaurant, which did not close to honour Eid ul-Fitr, is attacked by a mob of fundamentalist Muslims. After the attack, Hendra reads the 99 names of Allah and converts to Islam; he attempts to approach Menuk, although it is unclear if she will accept him. Surya receives an offer from Rika to play the role of Jesus in her church's Christmas and Easter pageants, which he accepts for a high fee after hesitating due to fears that it will be against his religion; after the pageant he reads Al-Ikhlas in a mosque. Rika is able to obtain her parents' blessing for her conversion.

== Cast ==
- Revalina S. Temat as Menuk, a religious Muslim woman who wears a hijab and is married to Soleh. Menuk works at Tan Kat Sun's restaurant alongside her would-be suitor, Sun's son Hendra. According to Temat, Menuk married Soleh, whom she did not love, instead of Hendra because Soleh was Muslim.
- Reza Rahadian as Soleh, Menuk's unemployed Muslim husband, who wishes to be a hero for his family. He eventually joins the Banser branch of the Nahdlatul Ulama (NU) and is tasked with protecting places of worship from possible terrorist attacks. He dies in the process of removing a bomb from a church full of worshippers.
- Endhita as Rika, a young divorcée, mother of one, and Catholic convert. Because of her divorce and conversion, she is often looked down upon by her neighbours. She also comes into conflict with her son Abi, who did not convert with her, over her faith. Endhita received a nomination at the 2011 Indonesian Film Festival for Best Supporting Actress for her role, but lost to Dewi Irawan of Sang Penari (The Dancer).
- Agus Kuncoro as Surya, a young Muslim actor and Rika's boyfriend. His inability to secure more than bit parts provokes financial desperation and an existential crisis. He eventually lands the lead role as Jesus at Rika's Easter and Christmas pageants. Kuncoro received a nomination at the 2011 Indonesian Film Festival for Best Supporting Actor for his role, but lost to Mathias Muchus of Pengejar Angin (The Wind Chaser).
- Rio Dewanto as Hendra (Ping Hen), the son of Tan Kat Sun and Lim Giok Lie. He constantly argues with his parents, especially about running the restaurant. He falls in love with Menuk, but she rejects him since he is not Muslim. After the death of his father, he converts to Islam.
- Hengky Sulaeman as Tan Kat Sun, a Chinese-Indonesian restaurant owner, husband of Lim Giok Lie and father of Hendra. Sun's health is poor health, but he keeps a positive attitude.
- Edmay as Lim Giok Lie, wife of Tan Kat Sun and mother of Hendra. She often gives advice to Menuk.
- Glenn Fredly as Doni, a Catholic youth in love with Rika.
- David Chalik as Wahyu, a Muslim religious leader and adviser to Surya.
- Dedy Soetomo as the pastor of Rika's church.

== Production ==
? was directed by Hanung Bramantyo, who is of mixed Chinese-Javanese descent. He decided to direct a pluralist-themed film based on his own experiences as a mixed-race child. He chose the title ? to avoid protests upon the film's release, saying that if it had been named Liberalism or Pluralism there would be protests by opponents of those ideologies, and that he could not think of a better title. The individual characters are based on people Bramantyo has known or read about. His goal in making the film was to "clarify misleading arguments about Islam" and counter the portrayal of Islam as a "radical religion". In a pre-release press conference, Bramantyo said that ? was not meant to be commercial, but to make a statement. The film, his fourteenth, is one of several Islam-themed movies he has directed, after the polygamous romantic drama Ayat-Ayat Cinta (The Verses of Love; 2008) and the biopic Sang Pencerah (The Enlightener; 2009).

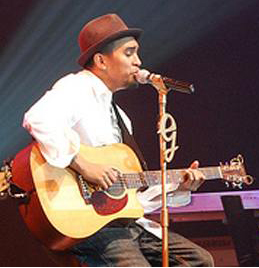
The singer Glenn Fredly found his character interesting, given the sensitive religious situation in Indonesia.

Fearing that the theme of pluralism would be taken as a "battle cry", some investors abandoned their commitments; Bramantyo was also unable to find support from mainstream studios. Before screening the film for the Indonesian Film Censor Board, several scenes were cut, including one in which a pig's head was displayed in the window of Sun's restaurant; other scenes that raised commentary were kept, although trimmed. Prior to the film's release, Bramantyo consulted about twenty people, including several religious leaders, in an attempt to ensure that the film was not offensive. Titien Wattimena was brought in to work further with the script; she put more emphasis on the message of tolerance.

Mahaka Pictures, owned by the same group as the predominantly Muslim Republika, co-produced the film with Dapur Film. The director of Mahaka Pictures, Erick Thohir, stated that his company had assisted with production because he "was disturbed by the fact that Indonesian films have declined in quality". He was willing to work with Bramantyo, as he found that the latter had proven to be a skilled director of religious films through his earlier work. Filming began on 5 January 2011 in Semarang; Bramantyo later described the city as a good example of tolerance in action. The film reportedly cost Rp 5 billion ($600,000) to produce. Two songs by the Indonesian band Sheila on 7, "Pasti Kubisa" ("Sure I Can") and "Kamus Hidupku" ("Dictionary to My Life") were used in the soundtrack, while Satrio Budiono and Saft Daultsyah handled sound editing.

Mulyo Hadi Purnomo, based in Semarang, was tasked with casting the minor roles. Bramantyo contacted the main cast members directly. Agus Kuncoro, who had acted in Sang Pencerah and was known for playing in Islamic-themed films, agreed to play Surya in ? immediately after reading the script. Singer Glenn Fredly was interested in playing Doni because he considered the character, an ultra-conservative Catholic, an interesting role, given the sensitive religious situation in the country. Revalina S. Temat, who had appeared in Bramantyo's 2009 film Perempuan Berkalung Sorban (The Girl With the Keffiyeh Around Her Neck), found her role as Menuk interesting and more serious than her recent work in horror films. Endhita, whom Bramantyo called for the role, expressed interest as soon as she received an outline of the plot.

== Themes and style ==
Ade Irwansyah, writing for Tabloid Bintang, notes that the film is a "microcosm" of Indonesia, which has numerous religious groups that often come into conflict. Irwansyah writes that Bramantyo intended for viewers to think of the religious conflicts that happen daily, and how to deal with differences in culture and beliefs, while Bramantyo has called the film his own personal interpretation of the country's religious situation. The film critic Eric Sasono noted this was apparent from the film's tagline, "Is it still important that we are different?", (Note: Original: "Masih pentingkah kita berbeda?") and suggested that Bramantyo feared that Indonesia was becoming a monolithic state. According to Sasono, the conflict in ? is settled when the characters begin believing that all religions are good, and all praise God; thus, all religious conflict would end if people were to accept other beliefs.

The Jakarta Globe describes the film as a "study of the role and state of Islam in modern Indonesian society". Sasono noted that the Muslim majority in the film did not have their motives shown explicitly, be it for the use of the racist term "Cino" or for attacking Sun's restaurant. After comparing the actions of Muslim groups in ? and Asrul Sani's films Al Kautsar (1977) and Titian Serambut Dibelah Tujuh (Titian Serambut, Divided by Seven; 1982), Sasono suggested that Bramantyo may have been expressing a fear that these groups no longer needed provocateurs to attack others. He notes that a scene in which a Catholic priest is stabbed by two men on a motorcycle reflects a September 2010 case in Bekasi, which had become a national issue. He further describes the camera angles as vulgar, abandoning subtlety, but suggests that they made the work more dramatic; he indicates that this was readily apparent with a scene in which part of a mosque falls apart.

== Release ==
? debuted at Gandaria City in South Jakarta on 31 March 2011, with a wide release on 7 April. Its release coincided with a contest sponsored by a local cellular service provider that called on viewers to decide the best name to describe the events shown in the film; it was said that the best name to be submitted would be used on the DVD release, but this was ultimately not done. Within five days of its premiere, ? had been seen by almost 100,000 people. ? had been watched by more than 550,000 people by mid-September. (Note: For comparison, the best selling Indonesian film of 2011, Surat Kecil Untuk Tuhan (A Small Letter to God), was viewed by more than 750,000 persons (Yazid 2011, 2011: The Year).) The film was also shown internationally. At the sixth Indonesian Film Festival in Australia, ? was screened to full theatres on 25 August 2011 as the festival's closing film. According to Bramantyo, the film was also screened in Vancouver and Paris, receiving positive feedback.

A novelisation of the film, entitled Harmoni Dalam Tanda Tanya (Harmony in Tanda Tanya) and published by Mahaka Publishing, was released in December 2011. Written by Melvy Yendra dan Adriyati, it further expanded the background of the film, including the relationship between Hendra and Menuk. On 21 February 2012, ? was released on DVD by Jive! Collection, after passing the censorship board in January. The DVD featured Indonesian audio, Indonesian and English subtitles, a behind-the-scenes documentary, and a gallery of photographs from production. In a preface on the DVD's liner notes, Ronny P. Tjandra of Jive! Collection wrote that viewers should view the film with open hearts, as the conflicts within reflected actualities in society.

== Reception ==
Critical reaction to ? was favourable. Indah Setiawati of The Jakarta Post wrote that the film was a "gallant attempt to promoted [sic] moderate Islam and reveal the sensitive issues in the country in a casual way", and that viewers should "get ready to burst into laughter and break down in tears". Aguslia, writing for Tempo, said that it was better than the 2010 Citra Award winner 3 Hati Dua Dunia, Satu Cinta, which had similar themes. Kartoyo DS, reviewing for Suara Karya after a press screening, praised the plot, visuals, and music.

Benny Benke, writing for the Semarang-based daily Suara Merdeka, found that Bramantyo had used ? to portray tolerance in Indonesia without making the subject seem cliché; however, he considered some scenes, such as Hendra's conversion, overdone. Frans Sartono, reviewing for the historically Catholic daily Kompas, considered the film heavily didactic but ultimately interesting, because its social commentary was much needed, considering Indonesia's religious turmoil. He also noted that the characters were driven to their actions by worldly needs and not religion.

== Controversy ==
After the release of ?, extremist group Islamic Defenders Front (Front Pembela Islam, or FPI) demonstrated against the film, owing to its pluralist message. Banser, the youth wing of the NU, also protested the film, taking offence to a scene in which Banser members are paid to do their charitable duties; they insisted that they are not. Meanwhile, the head of the Center For Culture of the Indonesian Ulema Council (Majelis Ulama Indonesia, or MUI) Cholil Ridwan stated that "the film clearly propagates religious pluralism". Protests also erupted when SCTV announced plans to show ? during Eid al-Fitr in 2011; the FPI organised a demonstration in front of the station's office, in which hundreds of its members called for further cuts to the film. The network later decided against showing the film in a decision which was heavily criticised and seen as "giving in" to the FPI. (Note: The NU, which had previously objected to the film, also criticised this decision (The Jakarta Globe 2011, SCTV Widely Criticized).)

In response to the criticism of ?, Minister of Culture and Tourism Jero Wacik expressed that the film would be best titled Bhinneka Tunggal Ika ("Unity in Diversity", the Indonesian national motto), and that its depiction of inter-ethnic and interfaith tolerance reflected Indonesia's "national character". Yenny Wahid, a religious activist and daughter of former president and noted pluralist Abdurrahman Wahid, said that ? had "succeeded in conveying the ideas of pluralism in Indonesia", and that critics should not look at it in fragments. Although initially tweeting that the protests were free promotion, Bramantyo later entered discussions with the MUI and agreed to cut some scenes to avoid protests. In an October 2011 interview, he said he was "bewildered" that the film was poorly received by Muslims.

== Awards ==
? received 9 nominations at the 2011 Indonesian Film Festival, winning one Citra Award for Best Cinematography. Together with Ifa Isfansyah's Sang Penari and Benni Setiawan's Masih Bukan Cinta Biasa (Still Not Just an Ordinary Love), it was the most-nominated film of the year; however, ? received the least Citra Awards of the three. Sang Penari won two of the awards for which ? had been nominated, including Best Director, while Masih Bukan Cinta Biasa took Best Sound and Kamila Andini's The Mirror Never Lies bested ? for Best Original Story. In 2012 ? was nominated for three awards at the Bandung Film Festival, winning none; all three awards were taken by The Mirror Never Lies.

Award	Year	Category	Recipient	Result
Indonesian Film Festival	2011	Best Director	Hanung Bramantyo	Nominated
Indonesian Film Festival	2011	Best Screenplay	Titien Wattimena	Nominated
Indonesian Film Festival	2011	Best Original Story	Hanung Bramantyo	Nominated
Indonesian Film Festival	2011	Best Cinematography	Yadi Sugandi	Won
Indonesian Film Festival	2011	Best Artistic Direction	Fauzi	Nominated
Indonesian Film Festival	2011	Best Video Editing	Cesa David Luckmasyah	Nominated
Indonesian Film Festival	2011	Best Sound Editing	Satrio Budiono & Saft Daultsyah	Nominated
Indonesian Film Festival	2011	Best Supporting Actor	Agus Kuncoro	Nominated
Indonesian Film Festival	2011	Best Supporting Actress	Endhita	Nominated
Bandung Film Festival	2012	Best Director	Hanung Bramantyo	Nominated
Bandung Film Festival	2012	Best Cinematography	Yadi Sugandi	Nominated
Bandung Film Festival	2012	Best Poster		Nominated
