= Misteri Gunung Merapi (TV series) =

- Also known as: Misteri Mak Lampir; Legenda Gunung Merapi
- Genre: Action; History; War; Horror; Mystery
- Created by: Genta Buana Pitaloka
- Written by: M. Abnar Romli; Niki Kosasih
- Screenplay by: M. Abnar Romli
- Story by: Asmadi Sjafar
- Directed by: M.Abnar Romli; Ucik Supra; ED.Pesta Sirait; Muchlis Raya; Dimas Haring; Billy Kepayang
- Starring: Farida Pasha; Marcelino; Yuni Sulistyawati; Syamsul Gondo; Rizal Djibran; Wulan Guritno; Monica Oemardi
- Country of origin: Indonesia
- Original language: Bahasa Indonesia
- No. of seasons: 3
- No. of episodes: 261

Production
- Producer: Budhi Sutrisno
- Running time: 60 minutes
- Production company: Genta Buana Pitaloka

Original release
- Network: Indosiar; RTV
- Release: November 1, 1998 – November 20, 2005

Related
- Tutur Tinular; Angling Dharma

Misteri Gunung Merapi (Mystery of Mount Merapi) is an Indonesian historical-drama television series, produced by Genta Buana Pitaloka. It first aired on Indosiar on November 1, 1998.

== Synopsis ==
Historically, Mak Lampir was locked inside a coffin inscribed with verses of the Koran by Kyai Ageng Prayogo, a disciple of Sunan Kudus who were ordered by the Sultan, Raden Patah to exterminate heresy and destroyed the wicked Mak Lampir.

The story then retreated back to the events leading up to the fight. Mak Lampir, after sacrificing a baby, talks to the followers of Tawny Orchid Sect on the powers she received from the god Batara Kala in the sect's nest, the Satan Cave.

Meanwhile, Raden Patah holds a meeting with his council regarding Lampir, who is terrorizing the kingdom. He asks Sheikh Sunan Kudus on the potential candidate who is the most eligible to lead the suppression mission against the evil sect on the slopes of Mount Lawu. The Sunan then observed the people present in the meeting and proposes that Kyai Ageng Prayogo to lead the raid, because he sees the light of goodness on the latter's forehead.

His anger will plan the kingdom of Demak, and menyantet Kyai Ageng Prayogo. Prayogo finds the goods and he is attacked by a black cat who turns into a cobra. With his power, he is able to defend himself and destroy the black magic snake. At that moment, the Holy Sunan greets him from the door and sees Prayogo, saying that Prayogo is tempted by the enemy. He reminds Prayogo that the enemy is not haphazard, and gave the wand. He said that Lampir cannot die, because he is a master of black magic. The only way to destroy it is locked in crates of black iron pantek dipantek with gold in every corner.

Lampir, stalking from the nest bowl, feels challenged by Sunan Kudus, which he feels he cannot not emulate. He seeks the help of the Queen to South Beach, Gusti Roro Kidul. The next day, he and his students go to the South Coast and prepare an offering (buffalo head, crows, food and incense sticks) used to call Gusti Roro Kidul later in hanyutkan in waves. Gusti Roro Kidul is visible from the water with her ladies and asks about Mak Lampir. Lampir asks his help to fight Sunan Kudus. The Queen says that he should ask for forgiveness, because Sunan Kudus have armies of heaven that he cannot see. Lampir forces the Queen to help him. He gives a magic whip that must be soaked in blood, coupled with the holy sacrifice of seven babies. Kyai Ageng Prayogo and troops are already on the way to the slopes of Mount Lawu.

Troops arrive on the slopes of Mount Lawu, Lampir and students begin to fight. Lampir's blows are parried by Kyai Ageng Prayogo. Lampir also demonstrate whip saktinya able to issue the blast wave when in pecutkan. They fight on the water. Lampir's entrails were extracted by Kyai Ageng Prayogo, and sank to the bottom. The body parts come together again bringing Lampir back to life. However Prayogo confines Lampir inside the crate and store the crate in Lampir's nest. Before Prayogo goes, Lampir swore he would take revenge on Prayogo. Prayogo undermines Lampir's nest and Demak troops flee.

130 years later, when a group of men while hunting wild boar, one by the, Sarmah, collapsing into the hole. His friend, Sergeant, zooming in to help. Both explore the cave full of skulls was to find a way out, and find a chest Mak Attach the ditiban by idols Batara Kala (and guarded by the spirit that surrounds the chest, which can not be seen by Sarmah and Tahir). They both thought that it contained treasure chests, and try to open it. They succeeded, and Sarmah find Mak Lampir body lying in it. Tahir, on the other hand, see a treasure inside the coffin. Sarmah tried to escape while Tahir madly - crazy in the illusion of the treasure he saw, and accused Sarman as a greedy who want to take all the treasure. They fight martial arts, while Mak Lampir spirit back into his body. Sarmah defeated and fell in the coffin Mak Lampir, blood dripping to the lips Mak Lampir. Attach Mak was awakened and killed Sergeant, and then flips out of the cave. He declared vengeance to Prayogo descent, who had long died.

One night, in a village, some residents found dead with a claw wounds on his face, which turned out to be one family. Demak Kingdom, which has become the kingdom of Mataram, held a board meeting at the palace of the Sultan. The emperor wants to intervene itself to searching for the killer of citizens - the citizens, but the senopatinya said they would take care of it.

The scene then moves to martial arts fight between some men and an elderly woman who is good silat at night. The woman was able to be bound by Kyai Kanjeng palace, Sheikh Ali Akbar, and he is dedicated to one senopati Mataram. Senopati it also ordered the guards to lock her in a cage. Apparently, Mak Lampir has been transformed into Sheikh Ali Akbar unbeknownst to anyone.

The next morning, one of the powerful woman senopati discuss it with his subordinate, who was nicknamed Nini Thowok. The senopati was ordered to be brought to him. But a guard reported that the woman had escaped. The emperor then ordered to arrest her, dead or alive.

Meanwhile, a group of children - children playing gatrik on the outskirts of the village. Arrived - arrived Mak Lampir appear and catch gatriknya in the air and destroy it. Then he asked if one of them was the son of Aaron Hambali (one of the descendants Prayogo). Kids - and even then fleeing children.

At night, after learning lessons, Sembara, Bashir and Aji was driving home when one of them, Bashir, smell the incense. A huge bats flying over their heads, while Nyi Bidara watched from behind a bush - a bush. Bashir incontinent with fear, and the three of them hurried home. Mak laughing stock Lampir audible above the trees, follow the child - the child. They ran to the home of Aji to hide, but then laughing stock Mak Lampir stop, and Bashir and blabla home. Then, at midnight, Mak Lampir find Aji and would like to strike until later stopped by Nyi Bidara. Nyi Bidara and Mak Lampir martial arts fight, and it is clear that both are equal opponent. They disappear for a while, and his mother Aji, woke up, asking what events occur outside. Aji said there are people who fight, but her mother said she just inconsequential.

The next morning, the villagers talk about the incident last night. They heard a wide range of sound and suspect there what - what happened. It turned out that a woman had died strangled grandma. Her husband, Mr. Raisman came to where he was being taken care of by a Raden at his home and told him that he found a grandmother strangled his wife to death while his daughter Farida fear, but oddly enough, safe from Mak Lampir. Kanjeng and Raden was asked to meet with Farida and examine it, because Mak Lampir can not touch it.

Meanwhile, Nyi Bidara which is in a state wound - wound up at his house and asked for help of her husband, Kyai Jabad . Nyi Bidara tell that he's been fighting with Mak Lampir, and her husband know Mak Lampir of the story - the story of their first teacher, Ki Banaspati. Nyi Bidara Lampir Mak admitted that the power is much stronger than him, and told him how he could be battered so. The previous day, he intends to maintain the family of Mr. Raisman of Mak Lampir (mBok Gino is a descendant Prayogo) and provide an antidote to Farida reinforcements great revelation, but mBok Gino reject and expel Nyi Bidara go. On that night, Mak Lampir came to kill the family of Mr. Raisman, and he fought him. Mak Lampir this time set against Nyi Bidara, turned into a giant creeper twining plants - convolution Nyi Bidara, making battered.

On that night, Nyi Bidara call Lampir Mak, ordered him to stop the killing of descendant Prayogo and swore he would bury him as first Prayogo bury it. They both fought back, but Mak Lampir escaped.

== Cast ==
=== Season 1 (1998–2001) ===
Cast	As
Farida Pasha	Mak Lampir
Herby Latul	Kyai Ageng Prayogo; Badirul
Marcelino	Sembara
Devi Zuliaty	Farida
Yuni Sulistyawati	Farida (after Devi Zuliaty)
Syamsul Gondo	Basir
Reyvaldo Luntungan	Mardian (Ayah Grandong)
George Taka	Lindu Aji
Rizal Djibran	Lindu Aji (after George Taka)
Wulan Guritno	Pitaloka/Prihatini
Monica Oemardi	Mayangsari/Pendekar Perak
Candy Satrio	Jatmiko
Teddy Uncle	Panglima Kumbang; Jaka Wardhana
Hadi Leo	Sultan Demak; Demang Wirantanu; Ki Sentanu; Ki Bintara
Fendy Pradana	Sultan Agung
Hendra Cipta	Ki Mandaraka
Chairil JM	Tumenggung Surotani; Datuk Ranggasana
Prof. Wisnuwardhana	Sunan Kudus
Samsuri Kaempuan	Kyai Jabat
Nungki Kusumastuti	Maryamah (Sembara's Mother)
Baron Hermanto	Raisman (Farida's Father)
Anneke Putri	Rosminah (Farida's Aunt)
Yoga Pratama	Young Sembara
Niken Ayu	Young Farida
Anika Hakim	Nyi Bidara
Edi Tambudo	Kyai Jabat
Aldona Toncic	Nyi Roro Kidul; Nyi Blorong; Karen
S.Manan Dipa	Kyai Ageng Jembar Jumantoro
Fitria Anwar	Darasuta/Nyai Kembang
Simon Cader	Adolf Pieter
Rizal Muhaimin	Alang Kibar
Irman Heryana	Suminta; Bagus Sajiwo
Anne J. Cotto	Bagus Sajiwo's Mother
Chaerul JM	Bagus Sajiwo's Father
Liza Chaniago	Putri Wandan Sari; Katipari
Lannd S. Piana	Sentanu
Wingky Harun	Kalagondang
Lilis Suganda	Wak Bayau; Rindi Antika
Budi Swazkrone	Kapten De Voss
Randy Bramasta	Kalawika
Hendri Hendarto	Banuseta
Rochim Latul	Bakawulung
Lella Anggraini	Nyi Warik
Benny Burnama	Sarkali; Bongkok
Prie Panggih	Kyai Karang Senaya; Kyai Gozali; Kyai Jamas
Hans Gunawan	Kuwu Darta
Suzanna Meilia	Minten; Rinata (Ibu Grandong); Ratu Siluman Srigala
Diana Yusuf	Ibu Minten
Piet Pagau	Juragan Katma; Ki Bongkok
Yurike Prastika	Nyai Sunti
Dhini Aminarti	Mandakini
Deo	Omen
Titin Asmara	Mpok Kutut
Blirik	Ki Sangguling
Agus Kuncoro	Sultan Agung (after Fendy Pradana)
Ananda George	Kuda Sungsang

=== Season 2 (2001–2002) ===
Cast	As
Farida Pasha	Mak Lampir
Marcelino	Sembara
Yuni Sulistyawati	Farida
Syamsul Gondo	Basir
Rizal Djibran	Lindu Aji
Monica Oemardi	Mayangsari/Pendekar Perak
Irman Heryana	Bagus Sajiwo
Candy Satrio	Jatmiko
Rizal Muhaimin	Santa Lima/Mata Malaikat
Wingky Harun	Kalagondang
Lilis Suganda	Rindi Antika
Teddy Uncle	Panglima Kumbang
Samsuri Kaempuan	Kyai Jabat
Anika Hakim	Nyi Bidara
Nungki Kusumastuti	Maryamah
Baron Hermanto	Raisman
Aldona Toncic	Nyi Blorong
S.Manan Dipa	Kyai Ageng Jembar Jumantoro
Agus Kuncoro	Sultan Agung
Anto Wijaya	Kamasutra
Lyra Virna	Nona Corry; Gandasuli
Deo	Young Grandong
Suzanna Meilia	Kenting Jamas; Dewi Rara; Minten
Dian	Kenting Sari
Ulia Sari	Kenting Wulan
Febriyanti	Kenting Kuning
Christine Dewayanti	Winarti
Errina GD	Endang Sunarsih
Arif Iskandar	Gundala Seta
Chaerul JM	Datuk Larang Tapa

=== Season 3 (2002–2005) ===
Cast	As
Farida Pasha	Mak Lampir
Marcelino	Sembara
Yuni Sulistyawati	Farida
Syamsul Gondo	Basir
Rizal Djibran	Lindu Aji
Monica Oemardi	Mayangsari; Roro Inten; Dewi Racun (after Anne J. Cotto)
Irman Heryana	Bagus Sajiwo
Candy Satrio	Jatmiko
Lyra Virna	Gandasuli
Rizal Muhaimin	Santa Lima/Mata Malaikat
Wingky Harun	Kalagondang
Lilis Suganda	Rindi Antika; Nyi Roro Kidul
Chaerul JM	Datuk Larang Tapa
Dam Saputra	Datuk Larang Tapa (after Chaerul JM)
Anto Wijaya	Kamasutra
Fitria Anwar	Dewi Ambalika
Teddy Uncle	Panglima Kumbang
Samsuri Kaempuan	Kyai Jabat
Anika Hakim	Nyi Bidara
S.Manan Dipa	Kyai Ageng Jembar Jumantoro
Agus Kuncoro	Sultan Agung
Roy Jordy	Sultan Agung (after Agus Kuncoro)
Anne J. Cotto	Sarkati; Dewi Racun
Dian	Kenting Sari; Tukinah; Roro Gandari
Ulia Sari	Kenting Wulan; Endang Cuwiri
Febriyanti	Kenting Kuning; Inong
Christine Dewayanti	Kumbalini
Reynaldi	Rangga Seta; Sawung Dahana; Welu
Jhon Thasrif	Sawung Dahana Dewasa
Kiki	Grandong (after Nurman Arief)
Deo	Mahesa Jenar Kecil
Choky Andriano	Mahesa Jenar
Ahmad Affandy	Mahesa Jenar (after Choky Andriano)
Errina GD	Dewi Sendok; Mawar Putih; Dewi Iprih
Hellya Septiana	Dewi Bajul
Arif Iskandar	Gundala Seta; Setan Utara 1
Dwi Andhika	Bondan
Angel Karamoy	Puspita
Lucky Hakim	Raden Samba
Sofie Amalia	Sukmawati; Roro Setyawati
Budi Chaerul	Ki Dunia Banda; Gundala Seta
Penty Nur Afiani	Ayu Wulandari
Rah Syahputra/Chris Chandra	Blotong
Imel Putri Cahyati	Citrasena
Mahisa Aulia Dinsi	Tirta/Jaka Lelana
Suzanna Meilia	Minten; Wulandari; Rindi Antika (after Lilis Suganda)
Revi Mariska	Winarih (Putri Dewi Ambalika & Kamasutra); Dewi Kala; Dian Selasih
Ananda George	Ismoyo
Sandy Permana	Rangga Seta; Aryasoma
Nurman Arief	Grandong/Indrajit; Ki Wangs; Prabu Naga Pratala; Ki Bagaspati
Denia	Nyi Tuwi; Puspa
Amprah Erlangga	Ki Lupit
Murti Sari Dewi	Nyai Parwati
Ratu Annisa	Putri Rembulan
Diaz Erlangga	Gendowor/Topeng Hitam
Dani Permana	Tumenggung Martoloyo
Afdhal Yusman/Ricky Rifky	Puspo Negoro
Hans Gunawan	Kyai Jumantoro
Aris Kurniawan	Aji Basa Pamungkas /Bayu Seta
Reyvaldo Luntungan	Kapten Marcus; Tumenggung Wiralaga; Sang Hyang Naga Percona; Dewa Petir
Sigit Antonio	Raden Sutejo; Amangkurat I
Temmy Rahadi	Murid Datuk Larang Tapa
Bima Sena	Pangeran Purbaya
Rendy Bramasta	Tumenggung Alap Alap
Ruslan Basri	Kyai Jabat
R. Novel	Kyai Basari
Fairus Salam	Dewi Sekar Arum
Alex Bernard	Kyai Ageng Sebayu
Ratu Anya	Sang Hyang Kili
Imelda Soraya	Nyi Blorong
M. Arif	Setan Utara 3
Nurcholis	Raden Permadi/Wiratsangka
Andez Raditya	Raden Permadi/Wiratsangka (after Nurcholis)
	Banowati
	Nagasariti
Alan	Ki Welang
Puput	Nyi Weling
Lisda Oktaviani	Nandini (siluman ular); Roro Grinsing; Nyi Blorong (after Imelda Soraya
Faisal Bugis	Pangeran Trunojoyo
Arifin Gunawan	Jaka; Kuma Somala
Husein Khalia	Hiralal Shangker; Tumenggung Martopuro; Setan Bongkok
Alfiano	Kala Roma Abang
Zaenal Patikawa	Ki Pangalanan
Wawan	Ki Mertani
Wawan Bima	Ki Sumangkar
Mack Reynaldo	Pangemis Tangan Seribu
Yoseph Holne	Ki Panut
Rossi Ayu	Nyi Panut; Ambarwati
Yuri Zhang	Mawar Putih (after Errina GD)
