= Rio Dewanto =

Indonesian actor and model

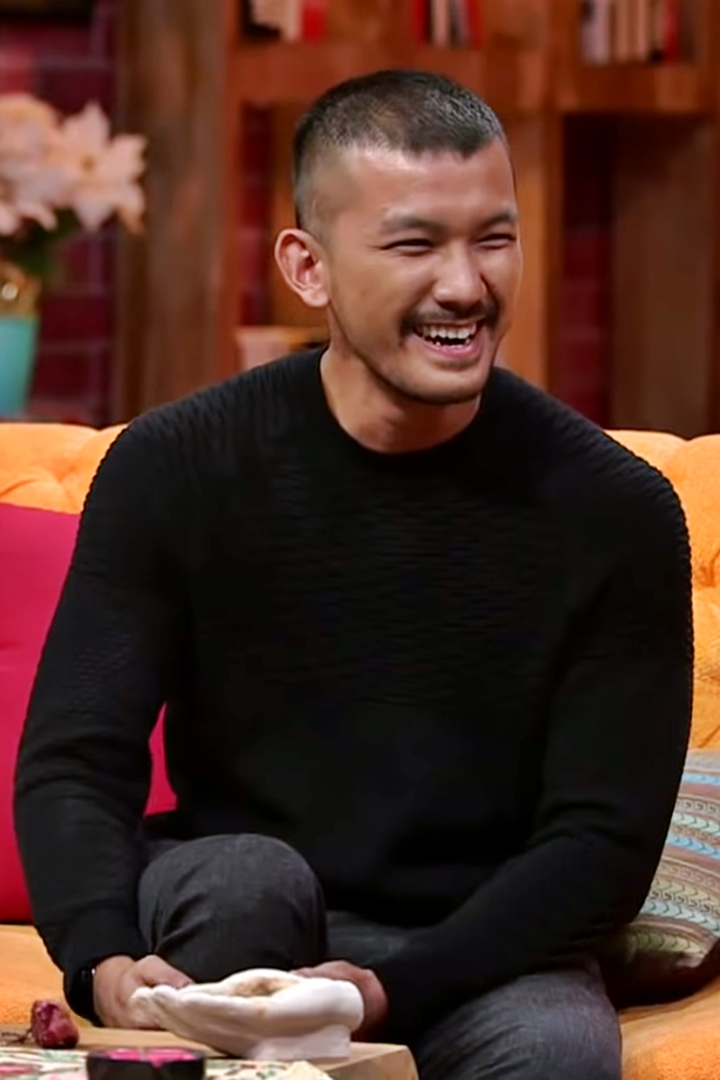
- Rio Dewanto on Ini Talkshow Netmediatama
- Born: 28 August 1987 (age 38); Jakarta, Indonesia
- Occupations: Celebrity; Model; Singer
- Years active: 2008–present
- Spouse: Atiqah Hasiholan (m. 2013)
- Children: Salma Jihane Putri Dewanto
- Parent(s): Winarto Subekti (father); Budi Setyowati (mother)
- Relatives: Ratna Sarumpaet (mother-in-law)

Rio Dewanto (born in Jakarta, Indonesia on 28 August 1987) is an Indonesian actor and model of Javanese descent.

== Career ==
Rio Dewanto began his debut career as film actor when played his cameo role in the two films, titled Pintu Terlarang (2009) and Ratu Kosmopolitan (2010). In 2011, Dewanto played the lead role as Hendra/Ping Hen, in a drama film that emphasized Indonesian pluralism which was directed by Hanung Bramantyo, titled ? (née Question Mark). The next year, Dewanto played as John Evans, the main character in the film Modus Anomali which was directed by Joko Anwar.

Dewanto played his fourth role as Octa in a sequel of a film, titled Arisan! 2 (2011) and sang the original soundtrack song for "Cinta Terlarang". For his performance in these films, Dewanto earned his first 2012 Favorite Supporting Actor trophy award at Indonesian Movie Awards. Dewanto also starred with Atiqah Hasiholan (now his wife) in the film Hello Goodbye where they filmed the movie in South Korea.

In addition, Dewanto starred in Indonesian small screens, including the popular drama which aired in SCTV, Love in Paris season 1 and 2.

== Personal life ==
In mid-2013, Dewanto married fellow film actress Atiqah Hasiholan. The ceremony was held in the Pulau Kelor, Kepulauan Seribu.

== Filmography ==
=== Film ===
Year	Title	Role	Notes
2009	Pintu Terlarang	The Man at Church	Supporting role
2010	Ratu Kosmopolitan		Cameo appearances
2011	?	Hendra/Ping Hen	Supporting role
2011	Arisan! 2	Octa	Supporting role Won – 2012 Maya Awards for Best Actor in a Supporting Role; Won – 2012 Indonesian Movie Awards for Favorite Supporting Actor; Nominated – 2012 Indonesian Movie Awards for Best Supporting Actor; Nominated – 2012 Indonesian Movie Awards for Best Chemistry (with Surya Saputra)
2011	Garuda Didadaku 2	Mr. Wisnu	Supporting role Nominated – 2012 Indonesian Film Festival for Best Supporting Actor
2012	Modus Anomali	John Evans	Lead role Nominated – 2013 Indonesian Movie Awards for Best Actor; Nominated – 2013 Indonesian Movie Awards for Favorite Actor
2012	Hello Goodbye	Abi	Lead role Nominated – 2013 Indonesian Movie Awards for Best Chemistry (with Atiqah Hasiholan)
2012	Bait Surau	Rommy	Lead role
2013	Java Heat	Anton	Supporting role
2013	Mursala	Anggiat Simbolon	Lead role
2013	Optatissimus	Andreas	Lead role
2014	Aku Cinta Kamu	Randu	Segment: "Firasatku"; Nominated – 2014 Maya Awards for Best Actor in an Omnibus
2014	Me & You vs. The World	Jeremy	Lead role
2015	2014	Satria	Supporting role
2015	CJR The Movie	D-doc	Supporting role
2015	Cinta Selamanya	Hafez	Lead role
2015	Love and Faith	Kwee Tjie Hoei	Lead role Nominated – 2015 Indonesian Film Festival for Best Leading Actor; Nominated – 2015 Maya Awards for Best Actor in a Leading Role
2015	Filosofi Kopi	Jody	Lead role
2015	Bulan Diatas Kuburan	Sahat	Lead role
2016	Surat Dari Praha	Dewa	Supporting role
2016	Ini Kisah Tiga Dara	Yudha	Supporting role
2016	Wonderful Life	Producer	
2016	I Leave My Heart in Lebanon	Captain Satria	Lead role
2018	Filosofi Kopi 2: Ben & Jody	Jody	Lead role
2019	Foxtrot Six	Bara	Lead role
2019	Gundala	Sancaka's father	Supporting role
2020	One Day We'll Talk About Today	Angkasa	Lead role
2022	Ben & Jody	Jody Hermanto	
2022	7–24	Anggara	
2022	The Antique Shop	Wadi	Segment: Chair of Death
2022	Kamu Tidak Sendiri	Adrian	
2023	A Long Way to Come Home	Angkasa Narendra Putra	
2023	Sewu Dino	Sugik	
2023	Hari Ini akan Kita Ceritakan Nanti	Angkasa Narendra Putra	
2023	13 Bom di Jakarta	Arok / Ismail Gani	
2025	Alas Roban	Anto	
2025	Smothered	Alif	

=== Television ===
Year	Title	Role	Notes	Network
2008–2009	Cucu Menantu	Bagas	Supporting role	SCTV
2008–2009	Kasih dan Amara		Supporting role	Indosiar
2012–2013	Love in Paris	Rafa	Lead role Nominated – 2012 SCTV Awards for Famous Actor	SCTV
2013	Love in Paris Season 2	Rafa	Lead role Nominated – 2013 Festival Film Bandung for Best Soap Opera Male Supporting Role	SCTV
2016	Viva Barista	Himself	Non-fictional TV program	Metro TV

== Awards and nominations ==
Year	Awards	Category	Recipients	Result
2012	Maya Awards	Best Actor in a Supporting Role	Arisan! 2	Won
2012	Indonesian Movie Awards	Best Supporting Actor	Arisan! 2	Nominated
2012	Indonesian Movie Awards	Favorite Supporting Actor	Arisan! 2	Won
2012	Indonesian Movie Awards	Best Chemistry (with Surya Saputra)	Arisan! 2	Nominated
2012	Indonesian Film Festival	Citra Award for Best Supporting Actor	Garuda Didadaku 2	Nominated
2013	Indonesian Movie Awards	Best Actor	Modus Anomali	Nominated
2013	Indonesian Movie Awards	Favorite Actor	Modus Anomali	Nominated
2013	Indonesian Movie Awards	Best Chemistry (with Atiqah Hasiholan)	Hello Goodbye	Nominated
2013	Bandung Film Festival	Best Soap Opera Male Supporting Role	Love in Paris Season 2	Nominated
2013	Insert Awards	Sexiest Male Celebrity	Rio Dewanto	Nominated
2013	Yahoo! OMG Awards	Most Wanted Male	Rio Dewanto	Nominated
2013	Infotainment Awards	Most Lure Male Celebrity	Rio Dewanto	Nominated
2013	Infotainment Awards	Most Romantic Celebrity Couple	Rio Dewanto & Atiqah Hasiholan	Nominated
2014	Infotainment Awards	Most Phenomenal Celebrity Wedding	Rio Dewanto & Atiqah Hasiholan	Nominated
2014	Insert Awards	Sexiest Male Celebrity	Rio Dewanto	Nominated
2014	Maya Awards	Best Actor in an Omnibus	Aku Cinta Kamu	Nominated
2015	Indonesian Film Festival	Citra Award for Best Leading Actor	Love and Faith	Nominated
2015	Maya Awards	Best Actor in a Leading Role	Love and Faith	Nominated
2016	Indonesian Movie Actor Awards	Best Chemistry (with Chicco Jericho)	Filosofi Kopi	Nominated
2020	Maya Awards	Best Actor in a Leading Role	One Day We'll Talk About Today	Nominated
