= Endhita =

Indonesian model and actress

Enditha Wibisono, often referred to simply as Enditha, is an Indonesian model and actress. She garnered a Citra Award nomination for Best Supporting Actress for her role in ?.

== Career ==
Endhita, the youngest of three children, was born in Jakarta. She was a tomboy as a child, and in university studied banking. She entered the modelling industry in 1997 when a friend sent her picture to Femina magazine to compete in its model search program. She went on to be a finalist, and in 2010 she was listed as one of the 25 most successful "Face of Femina" competitors. She later became a catwalk model.

In 2002 Endhita made her feature film debut with Titik Hitam (Black Spot), a horror film. This was followed by a role in Bangsal 13 (Ward 13). In 2005 she starred in Missing as a woman with a sixth sense. Other film works included television serials such as Amira, Andali Lala = Julia Robert, and Pengantin Remaja (Teenage Bride). She also acted in the film Belahan Jiwa (Part of the Soul). FHM's publication of pictures of Endhita in skimpy clothing proved to be controversial in Indonesia. The images, which Endhita denied knowing were for public consumption, were subsequently purchased by the magazine's Spanish office.

In 2011, Endhita played Rika, a young divorcée, mother of one, and Catholic convert, in Hanung Bramantyo's film ?. She was called directly by the director and expressed interest as soon as he gave her an outline of the plot. She received a Citra Award nomination for Best Supporting Actress at the 2011 Indonesian Film Festival for the role. In October of that year she married Arlonsi Miraldi, the guitarist in the band Ungu.

As of June 2012 Endhita is five months pregnant and preparing for a role as a female police officer in Cintaku Di Saku Celana (Love in My Pants Pocket).

== Filmography ==
=== Film ===
Year	Title	Role
2022	Mengejar Surga	Ratih
2021	Kau & Dia	Ibu Zara
2021	Tersanjung the Movie	Diandra
2020	Di Bawah Umur	Sully
2019	Cintaku Selamanya	Manda
2019	Ambu	Hapsa
2012	Test Pack	Ibu hamil
2012	Cinta di Saku Celana	Briptu Nila
2011	Cewek Gokil	Fitri
2008	Hantu Jembatan Ancol	Yolanda
2008	Tali Pocong Perawan	Penampilan khusus
2006	Jatuh Cinta Lagi	Susan
