= Dilema (film) =

- poster film
- Directed by: Robert Ronny; Robby Ertanto Soediskam; Adilla Dimitri; Yudi Datau; Rinaldy Puspoyo
- Produced by: Wulan Guritno; Adilla Dimitri
- Starring: Wulan Guritno; Reza Rahadian; Roy Marten; Slamet Rahardjo; Ario Bayu; Pevita Pearce; Baim Wong; Jajang C. Noer; Winky Wiryawan; Abimana Aryasatya; Kenes Andari; Verdi Solaiman; Rangga Djoned; Lukman Sardi; Ray Sahetapy; Tio Pakusadewo; Alana Beilby
- Cinematography: Yudi Datau
- Edited by: Sastha Sunu
- Music by: Tya Subiakto Satrio
- Distributed by: WGE Pictures
- Release date: 23 February 2012
- Running time: 90 minutes
- Country: Indonesia
- Language: Indonesian

Dilema is an Indonesian drama film released on 23 February 2012, and produced by Wulan Guritno and Adilla Dimitri. The film stars Tio Pakusadewo, Wulan Guritno, Lukman Sardi, Abimana Aryasatya, Ario Bayu, Slamet Rahardjo, Baim Wong, Pevita Pearce, Winky Wiryawan, and Jajang C. Noer. Dilema also premiered in the Australia and unfortunately, the film received a failure in the number of spectators in Indonesia, totally 30.000.

The film was nominated for "Favorite Film" at the 2012 Indonesian Movie Awards and won "Best Feature Film" at the 2012 DetectiveFEST Moscow in Russia.

== Segments ==
The film is arranged into several segments, each with its own cast and director.

=== Big Boss ===
- Director: Rinaldy Puspoyo
- Roy Marten as Sony Wibisono
- Jajang C. Noer as Hetty
- Reza Rahadian as Adrian
- Abimana Aryasatya as Barry
- Verdi Solaiman as Suryo/Bodyguard 1

=== The Officer ===
- Director: Lim Dimitri
- Ario Bayu as Bayu Sustoyo
- Tio Pakusadewo as Bowo

=== Rendezvous ===
- Director: Yudi Datau
- Pevita Pearce as Dian
- Wulan Guritno as Rima

=== The Gambler ===
- Director: Robert Ronny
- Slamet Rahardjo as Sigit
- Ray Sahetapy as Gilang
- Lukman Sardi as Andri

=== Garis Keras ===
- Director: Robby Ertanto Soediskam
- Baim Wong as Ibnu
- Winky Wiryawan as Said
- Kenes Andari as Sesi

== Awards ==
Year	Award	Category	Recipients	Result
2012	DetectiveFEST Moscow	Best Feature Film	Dilema	Won
2012	Indonesian Film Festival	Best Supporting Actress	Wulan Guritno	Nominated
2012	Indonesian Film Festival	Best Editing	Sastha Sunu	Nominated
2012	Indonesian Film Festival	Best Cinematography	Yudi Datau	Won
2012	Indonesian Film Festival	Best Music System	Tya Subiakto Satrio	Nominated
2012	Indonesian Movie Awards	Best Actor	Tio Pakusadewo	Nominated
2012	Indonesian Movie Awards	Best Actress	Wulan Guritno	Nominated
2012	Indonesian Movie Awards	Best Newcomer Actor	Baim Wong	Nominated
2012	Indonesian Movie Awards	Best Chemistry	Wulan Guritno and Pevita Pearce	Nominated
2012	Indonesian Movie Awards	Favorite Actor	Tio Pakusadewo	Won
2012	Indonesian Movie Awards	Favorite Actress	Wulan Guritno	Won
2012	Indonesian Movie Awards	Favorite Newcomer Actor	Baim Wong	Won
2012	Indonesian Movie Awards	Favorite Film	Dilema	Nominated
2012	Maya Awards	Best Actor in a Leading Role	Roy Marten	Nominated
2012	Maya Awards	Best Actress in a Supporting Role	Wulan Guritno	Nominated
2012	Maya Awards	Best Costume Design	Jerry Oktavianus	Nominated
2012	Maya Awards	Best Makeup & Hairstyling	Jerry Oktavianus	Won
