= Kisah 9 Wali =

- Genre: Drama
- Created by: Genta Buana Paramita; Indi Kreasi
- Starring: Natalia Shasanti; Boy Hamzah; Donny Alamsyah; Reza Pahlevi; David Chaliq; Mario Irwinsyah; Tegar Satrya; Sandy Syarif; Ali Zaenal
- Country of origin: Indonesia
- Original language: Indonesian
- No. of seasons: 1 season

Production
- Running time: 90 minutes

Original release
- Network: MDTV
- Release: June 28 – July 28, 2014

Kisah 9 Wali is an Indonesian historical-drama TV series. This TV series was first aired of on June 28, 2014, the first day of Ramadan. This TV series will only run when Ramadan. This TV series tells about the story of 9 Wali spreading Islam on Java Island.

== Cast ==
- Natalia Shasanti as Anjani
- Boy Hamzah as Sunan Giri
- Donny Alamsyah as Sunan Kalijaga
- Reza Pahlevi as Sunan Kudus
- David Chalik as Sunan Gresik
- Mario Irwinsyah as Sunan Gunung Jati
- Tegar Satrya as Sunan Ampel
- Shandy Syarif as Sunan Drajat
- Ali Zainal as Sunan Bonang
- Dimas Seto as Sunan Muria
- Alex Abbad as Syekh Siti Jenar
- Dave Swatt
- Rosnita Putri
- Winda Khair
- Claudia Inda Lamanna
