= Singgasana Brama Kumbara =

- Genre: Action; History; War
- Created by: ANTV & PT. Menaragading Citraperkasa
- Written by: Imam Tantowi
- Screenplay by: Imam Tantowi
- Story by: Niki Kosasih
- Directed by: Denny HW
- Starring: Anto Wijaya; Shahnaz Haque; Murti sari Dewi; Viona Rosalina; Fitria Anwar; Agus Kuncoro; Adjie Pangestu
- Country of origin: Indonesia
- Original language: Bahasa Indonesia
- No. of seasons: 1
- No. of episodes: 47

Production
- Producer: Budhi Sutrisno
- Running time: 60 minutes
- Production company: PT. Menaragading Citraperkasa

Original release
- Network: ANTV
- Release: March 4, 1995 – November 20, 1996

Related
- Kaca Benggala; Tutur Tinular

Singgasana Brama Kumbara (Throne of Brama Kumbara) is an Indonesian historical-drama television series, produced by PT. Menaragading Citraperkasa (now Genta Buana Paramita). It is an adaptation of a popular radio series called "Saur Sepuh" with some changes in the plot. It was first aired on ANTV on March 4, 1995.

== Plot ==
Set in 14th-15th century West Java in a fictional kingdom called Madangkara, Singgasana Brama Kumbara tells the story of Brama Kumbara, a young man who becomes freedom fighter after Madangkara was occupied and oppressed by its neighbour, Kuntala Kingdom. Eventually Brama freed his country from the occupation and becomes the King of Madangkara.

== Cast ==
- Anto Wijaya as Brama Kumbara
- Shahnaz Haque as Harnum
- Murti Sari Dewi as Lasmini
- Fitria Anwar as Dyah Pitaloka and Sri Banon
- Viona Rosalina as Mantili
- Agus Kuncoro as Angkawijaya
- Devi Permatasari as Anggun
- Rizal Muhaimin as Wanapati
- Eddie Riwanto as Ardalepa
- Yati Octavia as Gayatri
- Advent Bangun as Panglima (Commander) Aragani
- B.Z. Kadaryono as Eyang (Grandpa) Astagina
- Piet Ermas as Pangeran (Prince) Gelang Manik
- Bambang Suryo as Prabu (King) Kertawarma and Dang Acharya
- Liza Chaniago as Gendari
- Lamting Saputra as Pangeran Purana and Arya Jimbaran
- Herby Latupeirissa as Prabu Malyapati and Angling Sangabhaya
- Gito Gilas as Pangeran Jayaningrat
- Aldona Toncic as Dewi Nisbi
- Adjie Pangestu as Pranaka
- Piet Pagau as Hadiraksa
- Munie Cader as Durgalapati
- Dian Sitoresmi as Nyai Darsih
- Eddy Chaniago as Darmasalira and Ajisura
- Chairil J. M. as Darmasukarta and Adipati (Duke) Jumawa
- Alvian as King of Kuntala
- Ami Priyono as Tumenggung Jayaraga
- Baron Hermanto as Tumenggung Dharmasandi
