= Bucek Depp =

Indonesian actor and model

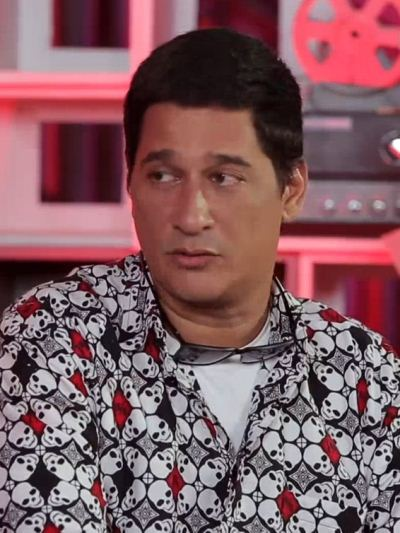
- Born: Al Arthur Muchtar; 29 January 1973 (age 53); Groningen, Netherlands
- Other name: Bucek
- Education: SMA Negeri 6 Jakarta
- Occupations: Actor, model
- Years active: 1991–present
- Spouses: Titi DJ (m. 1995; div. 1997); Unique Priscilla (m. 2001; div. 2007)
- Parent(s): Yus Machfud Muchtar (father); Eleonora Muchtar (mother)
- Relatives: Al Fathir Muchtar (brother); Fera Feriska (sister-in-law)

Al Arthur "Bucek" Muchtar (born 29 January 1973) is an Indonesian model and actor.

== Career ==
His father Yus Mahfud Muchtar is a betawi of Arab descent and his mother Eleonora is Dutch. His real name is Al Arthur Muchtar, his moniker Bucek Depp was given to him as a teen when he started his modeling career. He is the older brother of the Indonesian actor Al Fathir Muchtar who was also a model in his youth, and the brother-in-law of the actress Fera Feriska (since 2006).

== Personal life ==
Bucek was married to Titi DJ on May 9, 1995. They have three children, namely Salmaa Chetizsa, Salwaa Chetizsa and Daffa Jenaro. However, in 1997 they decided to divorce."

== Filmography ==
- Sekretaris (1991)
- Pengantin Remaja (1991)
- Kuldesak (1998)
- Beth (2002)
- Brownies (2005)
- Mereka Bilang, Saya Monyet! (2008)
- Operation Wedding (2013)
- Cinta Brontosaurus (2013)
- Merry Go Round (2013)
- Manusia Setengah Salmon (2013)
- 7 Misi Rahasia Sophie (2014)
- Me & You vs The World (2014)
- Marmut Merah Jambu (2014)
- Air & Api (2015)
- Tiger Boy (2015)
- Danur 2: Maddah (2018)
- Dilan 1991 (2019)

== Soap opera ==
- Keluargaku, Sorgaku (1999) as Chandra
- Nadin (2017) as Chandra

== Music videos ==
Year	Title	Artist
1995	"Bintang-Bintang"	Titi DJ
