= Rain Chudori =

Indonesian creative director and author (born 1994)

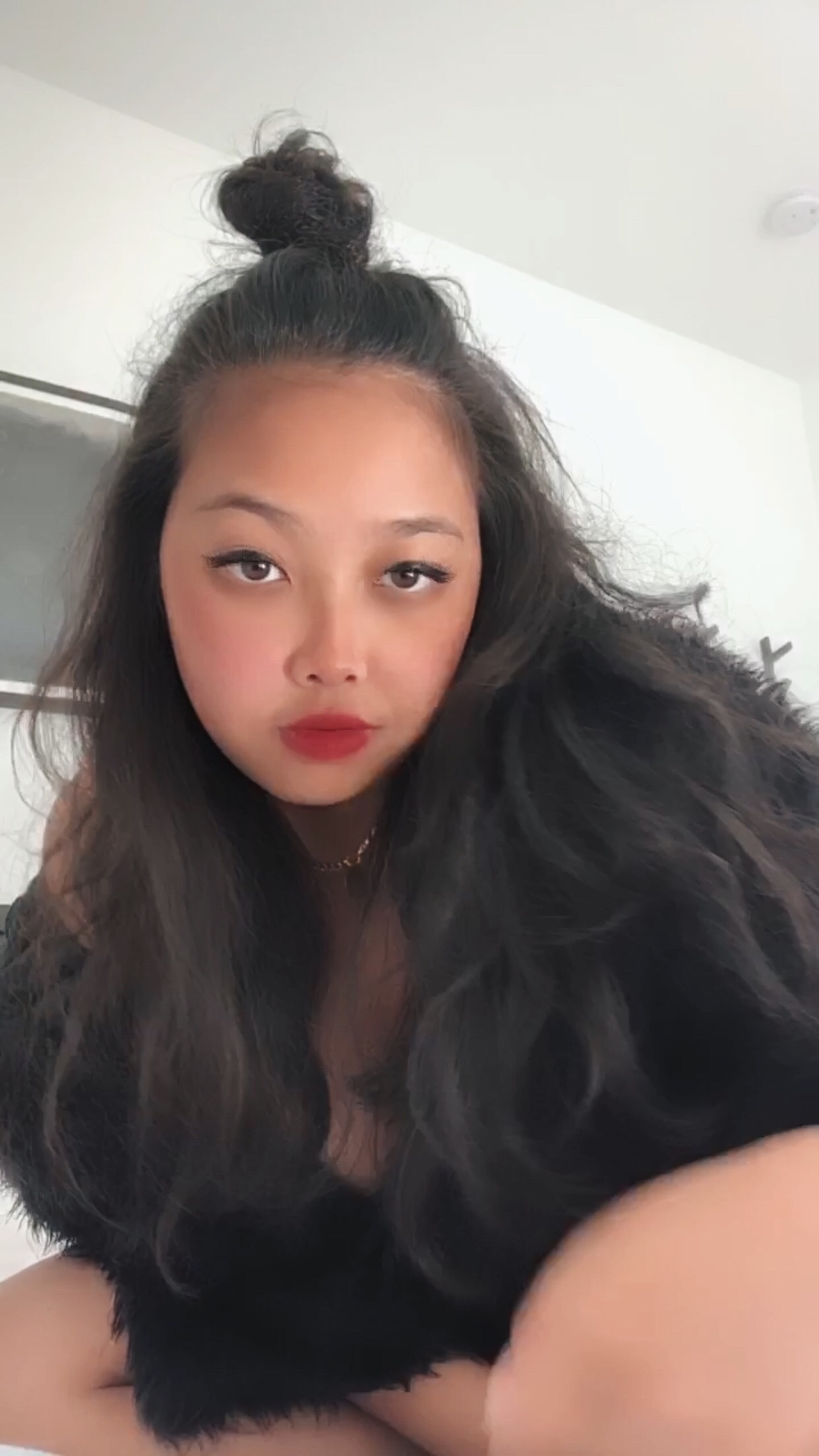
- Born: 10 November 1994 (age 31); Jakarta, Indonesia
- Occupations: Creative director; curator; author
- Writing career
- Period: 2009–present
- Website: peronhouse.com

Rain Chudori-Soerjoatmodjo (born 10 November 1994) is an Indonesian creative director, author, curator, and actress. Together with her mother, Leila Chudori, she co-founded a publishing company, Peron House which debuted in Ubud Writers and Readers Festival in 2023. Chudori has published several books.

== Biography ==
Chudori is the daughter of writer Leila Chudori and curator Yudhi Soerjoatmodjo, and granddaughter of journalist Muhammad Chudori. Chudori was an artist-in-residence in New York.

Chudori's short story collection Monsoon Tiger and Other Stories (2013) was launched in Jakarta in 2015. The book was translated into Indonesian under the title Biru dan Kisah-Kisah Lainnya in 2018. Her second book, a novel titled Imaginary City, was published in 2017.

Chudori is the founder of creative studio, Peron House and is the curator of Comma Books, a division of Penerbit KPG (Kompas, Gramedia).

She received the National Book Committee's Translation Selection at the Frankfurt Book Fair in 2015, and the LitRi Grant at the London Book Fair in both 2018 and 2019. She has written for The Jakarta Post, The Jakarta Globe, Tempo, Salihara, VICE, Whiteboard Journal, Portside Review, The Letters Page, and Kill Your Darlings. She has appeared in Ubud Writers and Readers Festival, Singapore Writers Festival, and Brahmaputra Literary Festival, among others.

Chudori appeared in the film Rocket Rain, which was nominated at the Jogja-Netpac Film Festival and won the Geber Award. It was also nominated for Best Non-Cinema Feature Film and won Best Director at Apresiasi Film Indonesia. Chudori was nominated for Best New Actress by Piala Maya Indonesia. In 2017, she had a role in the film Galih dan Ratna.

== Bibliography ==
- Monsoon Tiger and Other Stories (2015)
- Imaginary City (2018)
- Biru dan Kisah-Kisah Lainnya (2018)
- Imaginary City: A Visual Novel (2022)

== Filmography ==
- Rocket Rain (2013)
- Galih dan Ratna (2017)
