= Dena Rachman =

Indonesian actress (born 1987)

- Born: August 30, 1987 (age 39); Jakarta, Indonesia
- Education: University of Indonesia; London School of Economics
- Occupations: Actress; singer; activist
- Years active: 1990s–present
- Parent: Acan Rachman (father)

Dena Rachman (b. 30 August 1987) is an Indonesian childhood singer, actress and transgender rights activist.

== Personal life and education ==
Dena was born on 30 August 1987 in Jakarta, the second of four children to Acan Rachman, a choreographer, and Gina Rachman. Raised as male, she realized her gender identity when she was five years old. Her realization became more apparent when she was in middle school and in second grade in middle school, she started coming out to her friend circle. She was a student at SMP Labschool Rawamangun and then continued to SMA Negeri 6 Jakarta. In high school, although she was bullied and reported to her parents because of her identity, the school did not mind because of her achievements. After graduating from high school in 2005, she continued her education at the University of Indonesia, pursuing a degree in communication studies, and graduated in 2009. After that, she also got her master from Alma Graduate School, University of Bologna by pursue degree in Design, Fashion and Luxury Goods. She started her transition on 2013 after having conversation with her parents and having breast surgery on 2014. On 2018, she go to summer course in Leiden University to study gender studies in International law. In 2023, she also graduated for her second masters from The London School of Economics and Political Science in gender studies.

== Career ==
In the 1990s, she was famous as a singer of song Ole-ole dan Rukun Damai. The song was sung featuring Cut Mandasari, child singer. After that, she starred in Krucil, Indonesian television series about kids became television crew from 1997 till 1999. She continued starred in few television series such as Misteri Gunung Merapi and Karmapala.

== Activism ==
On 2019 Women's March in Indonesia, she made a speech about the freedom of expression and gender equality especially the discrimination that happened to them.
