= Wanda Hamidah =

Indonesian politician, actress and activist

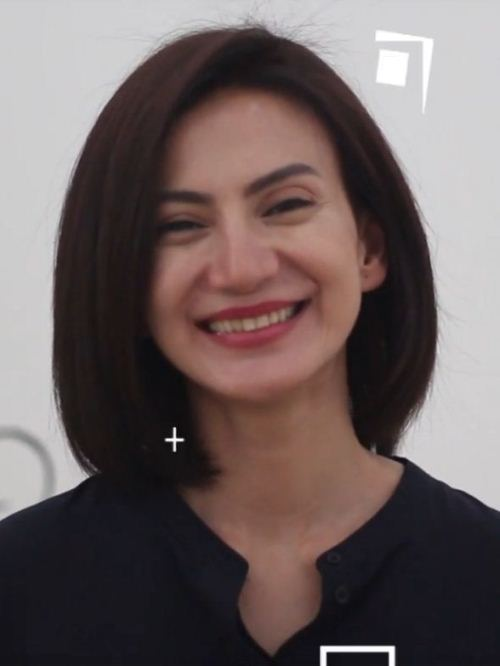
- Wanda in 2017

Member of Jakarta DPRD
- In office 25 August 2009 – 25 August 2014

Personal details
- Born: 21 September 1977 (age 48) Jakarta, Indonesia
- Party: National Mandate Party (1998–2014); NasDem Party (until 2022); Golkar (2022–2024)

Wanda Hamidah (born 21 September 1977) is an Indonesian politician, actress and activist. She was a member of the Jakarta Regional House of Representatives between 2009 and 2014.

== Early life and education ==
Wanda Hamidah was born in Jakarta on 21 September 1977. She studied at SMA Negeri 3 Jakarta, and later studied law at Trisakti University. She also took a masters of notary at the University of Indonesia.

== Career ==
Wanda began her career as a model, and she was one for around 12 years. Between 2000 and 2002, she was a news presenter at MetroTV. She participated in the student demonstrations of 1998 and joined the newly formed National Mandate Party (PAN) that year. According to Wanda, she was wanted for being part of the student demonstrations and she had witnessed the Trisakti shootings directly.

In 2009, she was elected into Jakarta's regional legislative body and was sworn in on 25 August. Wanda stated then that she wanted to run for the national People's Representative Council, but intended to learn at Jakarta's legislative council first.

During her time in the legislative body, she also featured in her first movie Pengejar Angin in 2011. She was also a commissioner in the National Commission of Child Protection (Komnas PA). She also had worked as a notary, operating her own office.

In 2014, she was fired from PAN due to her support of Joko Widodo in the 2014 Indonesian presidential election - while PAN supported Prabowo Subianto. After the expiry of her tenure in the DPRD, she became a critic of the body, citing excessive lobbying and opposing a proposal to revert direct gubernatorial elections to the DPRD. She later joined the NasDem Party, where she became the chairman of the party's Jakarta's branch. In the 2019 Indonesian legislative election, she ran for a seat in Jakarta's 1st electoral district (East Jakarta), but she failed to win a seat.

In October 2022, she moved from Nasdem to Golkar. In the 2024 legislative election, she ran again as a Golkar candidate in Jakarta I, but failed to win a seat after securing just 10,839 votes.

In August 2024, she left Golkar, citing the recent plans of revising the Constitutional Court of Indonesia's decision to change the minimum number of seats required to elect a Governor from the House of Representatives.

Hamidah took part in the Global Sumud Flotilla in 2025, though the ship she initially was passenger of could not continue the trip after reaching Sicily, where she remained for the rest of the flotilla's voyage as she failed to catch another ship to Gaza.

== Personal life ==
She was married to Cyril Raoul Hakim, having five children before their divorce, and she later remarried Daniel Patrick Hadi Schuldt with whom she had her sixth child.

== Filmography ==
- Pengejar Angin (2011)
- Cahaya Dari Timur: Beta Maluku (2014)
- Dear Love (2016)
