= Muhammad Chudori =

Muhammad Chudori (December 24, 1926 – March 23, 2013) was an Indonesian journalist. Chudori co-founded The Jakarta Post in 1983 and served as the newspaper's first general manager.

Chudori was born in Indramayu, Java, on December 24, 1926.

He worked as a journalist for the Antara news agency from 1956 until his retirement in 1983. He predominantly covered foreign policy and the economy for Antara. He had also served as Antara's bureau chief in the Netherlands as well. Chudori had close contacts within the Indonesian government and has been described as well-versed in the economic policies of the Suharto government at the time. Suharto's Economic Minister Widjojo Nitisastro often included Chudori, a prominent economics reporter, as an official member of the Inter-Governmental Group for Indonesia (IGGI) annual meeting in The Hague.

In 1983, Chudori co-founded the English-language newspaper, The Jakarta Post, shortly after retiring from Antara. He also became the first general manager of The Jakarta Post. Chudori worked to form a coherent newspaper staff while avoiding the government censors of the Suharto government. According to The Jakarta Post's co-founder and first editor-in-chief Sabam Siagian, "We all came from different backgrounds. It was not easy as general manager in these circumstances with the task of producing a quality newspaper. Muhammad Chudori was once the Antara bureau chief in the Netherlands and was the eldest among us. He would listen patiently to our various arguments and endure our idiosyncrasies and gradually forged a working team...I think that was his biggest achievement."

In 1997, the Indonesian Ministry of Information honored Chudori for his career.

Chudori's health declined since he fell and broke his femur in the Fall of 2012. He underwent two surgeries following the accident. Muhammad Chudori died at his home in Bogor, West Java, on March 23, 2013, at the age of 86. He was survived by his wife, Willy Septiana, his daughter, Leila S. Chudori, a journalist and writer at Tempo magazine, and his granddaughter, Rain Chudori, a writer. He was buried in Karet Bivak Cemetery in Central Jakarta.
