= Smothered (2025 film) =

2025 Indonesian thriller film

- Theatrical release poster
- Indonesian: Legenda Kelam Malin Kundang
- Directed by: Kevin Rahardjo; Rafki Hidayat
- Written by: Joko Anwar; Aline Djayasukmana; Rafki Hidayat
- Produced by: Tia Hasibuan; Joko Anwar
- Starring: Rio Dewanto; Faradina Mufti; Vonny Anggraini; Jordan Omar; Nova Eliza
- Cinematography: Ical Tanjung
- Edited by: Joko Anwar
- Music by: Zeke Khaseli; Yudhi Arfani
- Production companies: Come and See Pictures
- Release date: 27 November 2025 (Indonesia)
- Running time: 99 minutes
- Country: Indonesia
- Language: Indonesian

Smothered (stylized as sMOTHERed) (Indonesian: Legenda Kelam Malin Kundang) is a 2025 Indonesian psychological thriller film directed by Kevin Rahardjo and Rafki Hidayat in their directorial debuts. It stars Rio Dewanto, Faradina Mufti, Vonny Anggraini, Jordan Omar, and Nova Eliza. The film is a reinterpretation of the Minangkabau folktale Malin Kundang.

The film was released in Indonesian theatres on 27 November 2025.

== Premise ==
Alif, a miniature painter, has just recovered from amnesia after a car accident. When he returns home, he finds that he has invited his mother from West Sumatra, but he does not recognize her and suspects she is hiding something.

== Cast ==
- Rio Dewanto as Alif
  - Sulthan Hamonangan as young Alif
- Faradina Mufti as Nadine, Alif's wife
- Vonny Anggraini as Amak Aminah
- Jordan Omar as Emir, Alif's son
- Gambit Saifullah as Iqbal
- Nova Eliza as Amak

== Production ==
Smothered marks the feature directorial debuts of Kevin Rahardjo and Rafki Hidayat, as well as the first Come and See Pictures film not directed by its founder, Joko Anwar. However, Anwar served as the producer, cowriter, and editor. In November 2024, he announced the project as part of the production company's slate, along with three other projects. In May 2025, it was reported that the film would be released later that year, with Rio Dewanto and Faradina Mufti attached to star.

Principal photography took place in Jakarta and Bogor, West Java.

== Release ==
Smothered was released in Indonesian theatres on 27 November 2025. It garnered 51,541 admissions during its theatrical run. It competed for the Indonesian Screen Awards at the 20th Jogja-NETPAC Asian Film Festival.

== Accolades ==
Award / Film Festival	Date of ceremony	Category	Recipient(s)	Result	Ref.
Film Pilihan Tempo	26 January 2026	Best Supporting Actress	Vonny Anggraini	Nominated	
