= Genta Buana Paramita =

Indonesian film and television production company

- Country: Indonesia
- Broadcast area: Bekasi, Indonesia
- Affiliates: Indosiar; MNCTV; RCTI; SCTV; ANTV; Trans TV; Trans 7 RTV (TV Network); O Channel
- Headquarters: Bekasi, West Java, Indonesia

Programming
- Language: Indonesia

Ownership
- Key people: Budi Sutrisno
- Sister channels: Indosiar; MNCTV; RCTI; SCTV; ANTV; Trans TV; Trans7; Rajawali Televisi; O Channel

History
- Launched: 22 October 1988
- Replaced: Genta Buana Pitaloka (1995–2003); PT. Menaragading Citraperkasa (1993–1995)
- Closed: 29 October 2023
- Former names: Genta Buana Pitaloka (1988–2003); PT. Menaragading Citraperkasa (1993–1995)

Genta Buana Paramita (traded as PT. Gentabuana Paramita Film Production; formerly known as PT. Menaragading Citraperkasa) is an Indonesian production house founded in 1988 by Budhi Sutrisno. It is an Indonesian Film & TV Series production company.

== Productions ==
=== Film & Movies ===
==== 2017 ====
- Tiba-Tiba Lawan
- Harusnya Horrornya

=== TV Series ===
==== 1993 ====
- Mahkota Mayangkara

==== 1994 ====
- Mahkota Majapahit
- Kaca Benggala

==== 1995 ====
- Singgasana Brama Kumbara

==== 1997 ====
- Tutur Tinular

==== 1998 ====
- Misteri Gunung Merapi

==== 1999 ====
- Tutur Tinular II

==== 2000 ====
- Angling Dharma

==== 2001 ====
- Misteri Gunung Merapi 2

==== 2002 ====
- Karmapala (Ramayana)
- Karmapala 2 (Mahabaratha)

==== 2003 ====
- Angling Dharma 2
- Misteri Gunung Merapi 3
- Nyi Roro Kidul
- Wali Songo
- Pengantin Lembah Hantu

==== 2004 ====
- Santet
- Jurus Halilintar
- Lutung Kasarung
- Mandala dari Sungai Ular

==== 2005 ====
- Roro Mendut
- Kuasa Ilahi
- Suratan Takdir
- Misteri Dua Dunia
- Misteri Ilahi

==== 2006 ====
- Keris Empu Gandring

==== 2007 ====
- Kugapai Cintamu
- Panji
- Tiara
- Anak Buangan

==== 2008 ====
- Melodi
- Andini
- Di Antara Dua Pilihan
- Jihan
- Larasati
- Monalisa

==== 2009 ====
- Amanda
- Anak Membawa Berkah
- Mukjizat Cinta
- Pengorbanan Anggun

==== 2010 ====
- Putri Duyung Marina
- Arjuna Mencari Cinta

==== 2011 ====
- Cintaku Melati
- Tutur Tinular Versi 2011

==== 2012 ====
- Kisah Sembilan Wali
- Hikayat Ali Baba
- Bukan Salah Takdir
- Layla Majnun
- Takdir Cintaku
- Mencari Jejak Bunda
- Kharisma

==== 2013 ====
- Brama Kumbara
- Dua Hati Satu Cinta
- Ketika Cinta Harus Memilih
- Damarwulan
- Ciung Wanara
- Angling Dharma 3

==== 2014 ====
- Kisah 9 Wali
- Ksatria Pandawa 5
- Kisah Aladin dan Lampu Wasiat
- Panji Kelana

==== 2015 ====
- Teater Legenda Indonesia
- Dendam dari Gunung Merapi

==== 2018 ====
- Misteri Gunung Merapi 4
