= Love in Paris (TV series) =

- Directed by: Iqbal Rais; Vemmy Sagita
- Starring: Michelle Ziudith; Dimas Anggara; Yunita Siregar; Rio Dewanto
- Theme music composer: Erick Kay
- Opening theme: Dia – Sammy Simorangkir
- Ending theme: Dia – Sammy Simorangkir
- Composer: Erick Kay
- Country of origin: Indonesia
- Original languages: Indonesian, some dialogues in French with Indonesian subtitles
- No. of seasons: 2
- No. of episodes: 116

Production
- Producers: Sukhdev Singh; Wicky V. Olindo
- Production locations: Jakarta, Indonesia; Paris, France
- Running time: 60 minutes
- Production companies: Screenplay Productions; TV5Monde

Original release
- Network: SCTV (Indonesia); TV5Monde (global); TV3 (Malaysia, 1st season only in 2013 to 2014)
- Release: October 22, 2012 – June 28, 2013

Love in Paris is an Indonesian drama series co-produced by Screenplay Productions and TV5Monde. It aired on SCTV (in Indonesia) and on TV5Monde (internationally) between October 22, 2012 and June 28, 2013. The series reached 2 seasons comprising 116 episodes. Notable cast members are Michelle Ziudith, Dimas Anggara, Yunita Siregar, and Rio Dewanto.

== Controversy ==
On December 27, 2012, filing of Love in Paris was taking place in Harapan Kita Hospital's ICU in Jakarta until 2:00 a.m., with the result that Ayu Tria, a seven-year old patient with leukaemia, was not able to receive their regular dose of chemotherapy and died.

== Awards ==
Award	Year	Nominee	Category	Result
SCTV Awards	2012	Love In Paris (season 1)	Top Program	Won
SCTV Awards	2012	Dimas Anggara	Top Actor	Won
SCTV Awards	2012	Rio Dewanto	Top Actor	Nominated
SCTV Awards	2012	Michelle Ziudith	Top Actress	Nominated
Bandung Film Festival	2013	Love In Paris (season 2)	Praised Sinetron	Nominated
Bandung Film Festival	2013	Dimas Anggara	Praised Sinetron Actor in Leading Role	Nominated
Bandung Film Festival	2013	Rio Dewanto	Praised Actor in Supporting Role	Won
Bandung Film Festival	2013	Michelle Ziudith	Praised Sinetron Actress in Leading Role	Nominated
Bandung Film Festival	2013	Vemmy Sagita	Praised Sinetron Director	Won
Bandung Film Festival	2013	Tisa TS	Praised Sinetron Screenwriter	Nominated
Bandung Film Festival	2013	Deni Irawan	Praised Sinetron Camera Director	Won
