= Timo Scheunemann =

Indonesian football manager (born 1973)

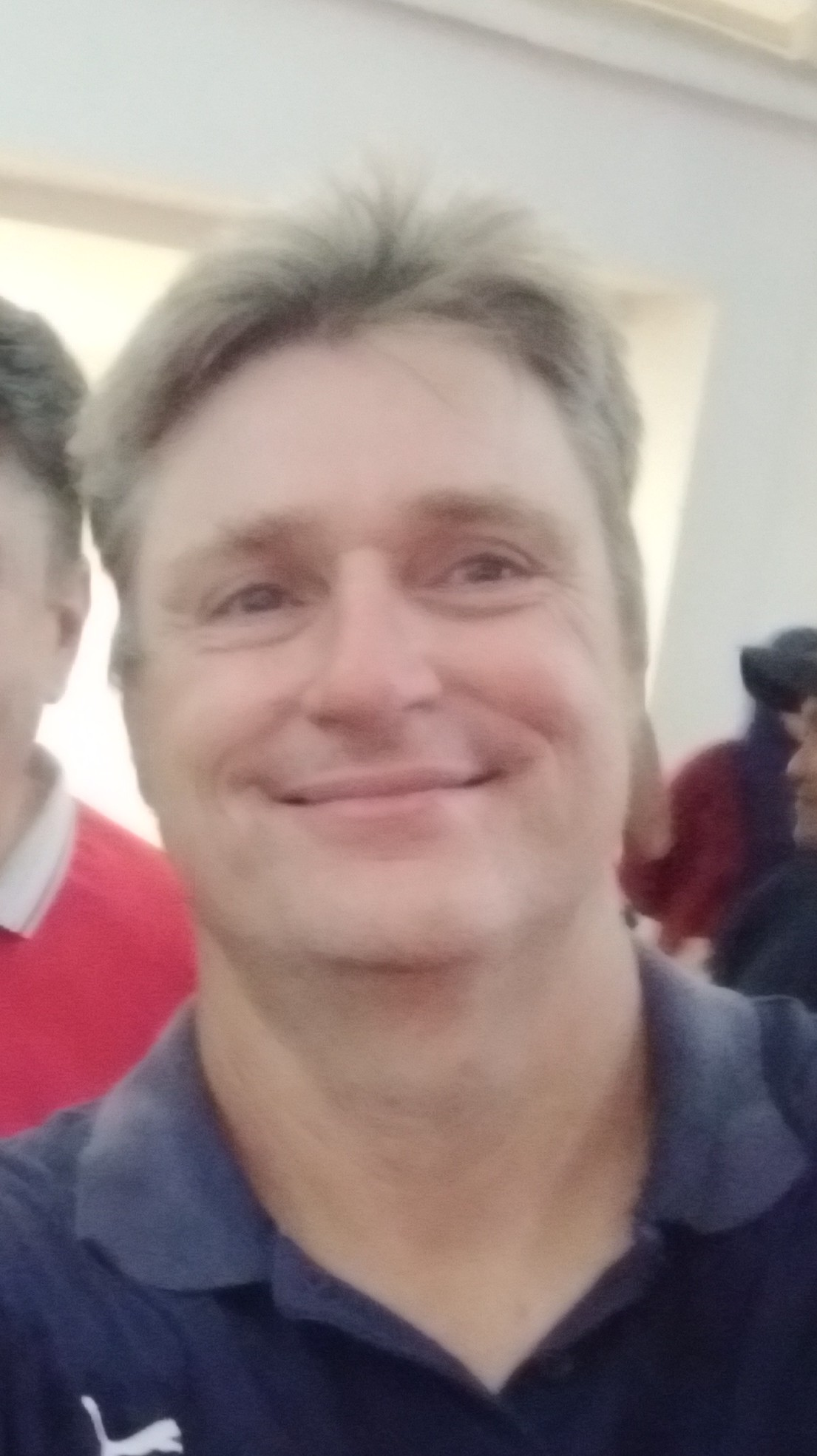
- Scheunemann in 2024

Personal information
- Full name: Timo Scheunemann
- Date of birth: 29 November 1973 (age 52)
- Place of birth: Kediri, East Java, Indonesia
- Height: 1.90 m (6 ft 3 in)
- Position: Forward

Team information
- Current team: Indonesia U17 Women (head coach)

Youth career
- Persik Kediri

College career
| Years | Team | Apps | (Gls) |
| 1993–1996 | The Master's Mustangs | | |

Senior career*
| Years | Team | Apps | (Gls) |
| 1997 | Persiba Balikpapan | | |
| 1998 | Tampines Rovers | | |

Managerial career
- 1999: Los Angeles SC (assistant)
- 2008: Indonesia Women
- 2010–2011: Persema Malang
- 2017: Persiba Balikpapan
- 2022: Nusantara United
- 2025–: Indonesia U17 Women
- * Club domestic league appearances and goals

Timo Scheunemann (born 29 November 1973) is an Indonesian professional football coach and former player who is head coach of the Indonesia national women's under-17 team.

A former forward, he played in Liga Indonesia and the S-League. He has also coached the Indonesia women's national team and Persema Malang.

== Early life and education ==
Scheunemann was born in Kediri, East Java, Indonesia to German parents.

He holds a Bachelor of Philosophy degree from The Master's University.

== Playing career ==
Scheunemann started his youth career with Persik Kediri, before starting his collegiate career in 1993 with The Master's Mustangs in the NCCAA Division I.

Upon graduation in 1997, he played for Persiba Balikpapan. After a year, he continued his career in the S-League with Tampines Rovers. By the end of 1998, he was invited for trials with German clubs Eintracht Frankfurt and Stuttgarter Kickers as well as with Gillingham in England.

== Coaching career ==
In 2007, Scheunemann was appointed technical director of Persikoba Batu. After that, he was asked to lead the Indonesia women's national team ahead of the 2009 SEA Games. He was appointed as the manager of Persema Malang in 2010. In 2017, Scheunemann held a managerial position at Persiba Balikpapan.

In August 2025, Scheunemann was appointed as the head coach of the Indonesia women's national under-17 team for the 2025 ASEAN U-16 Women's Championship.

== Personal life ==
Born in Indonesia to immigrant parents from Germany, Scheunemann is a native speaker of German but also speaks his adoptive country's national language of Indonesian and the local Javanese language fluently.

He lives in Batu, East Java as well as maintaining a residence in Dau, Malang Regency. He is married to Devi, a Javanese woman. The couple have two children, Naya and Brandon, a professional footballer who plays for the Indonesia national under-23 team.

He also has a niece named Claudia, also a professional footballer who plays for the Indonesia women's national team.

== Filmography ==
=== Film ===
| Year | Title | Role | Notes |
|---|---|---|---|
| 2011 | Tendangan dari Langit | Himself | Concurrently choreographer for the Persema team |
| 2013 | Soekarno | Lieutenant Colonel C. van den Hoogenband | |
| 2016 | Rudy Habibie | Pastor Gilbert | |
| 2017 | Ayat-ayat Cinta 2 | Philip | |
| 2018 | Belok Kanan Barcelona | Gunter | |
| 2018 | Hanum & Rangga: Faith & the City | Philipus Brown | |
| 2019 | Yowis Ben 2 | Cak Jim | |
| 2019 | Say I Love You | Teacher | |
| 2022 | Lara Ati | Frederick Hofmann | |

=== Web series ===
| Year | Title | Role | Notes |
|---|---|---|---|
| 2023 | Lara Ati 2 | Frederick Hoffman | |
