= Tutur Tinular =

- Also known as: Legenda Arya Kamandanu
- Genre: Action; History; War
- Created by: Genta Buana Pitaloka
- Written by: Imam Tantowi
- Screenplay by: Imam Tantowi
- Story by: S.Tidjab
- Directed by: Muchlis Raya; Prof. Mu Tik Yen
- Starring: Anto Wijaya; Deivy Zulyanti Nasution; Murti Sari Dewi; Lie Yun Juan; Piet Ermas; Agus Kuncoro; Chairil JM
- Country of origin: Indonesia
- Original language: Bahasa Indonesia
- No. of seasons: 2
- No. of episodes: 50 (series version); 27 (FTV version)

Production
- Producer: Budhi Sutrisno
- Running time: 60 minutes
- Production company: Genta Buana Pitaloka

Original release
- Network: ANTV; Indosiar; RCTI; RTV
- Release: October 25, 1997 – 1999

Related
- Singgasana Brama Kumbara; Misteri Gunung Merapi

Tutur Tinular is an Indonesian historical-drama radio series. Consists of 24 chapters with a total of 720 episodes, it was first aired in January 1989. At its prime, it was aired on 515 radio stations in Indonesia with millions of listeners. It was adapted to movies (Tutur Tinular I, II, III, IV) from 1989-1992. It was then adapted into a TV series produced by Genta Buana Pitaloka and first aired on ANTV on October 25, 1997.

The 1997 TV series version is considered as one of the best adaptation of the radio series.

== Cast ==
- Anto Wijaya as Arya Kamandanu
- Piet Ermas as Arya Dwipangga
- Deivy Zulyanti Nasution as Nari Ratih
- Murti Sari Dewi as Sakawuni
- Lamting as Loe Shih Shan
- Lie Yun Juan as Mei Shin
- Batdorj-in Baasanjab as Kau Hsing 1
- Tian Wei Dong as Kubilai Khan
- Agus Kuncoro as Raden Wijaya (Prabu Kertarajasa Jayawardhana)
- Chairil JM as Mpu Ranubhaya
- Hendra Cipta as Mpu Hanggareksa
- Syaiful Nazar as Mpu Tong Bajil
- Anika Hakim as Dewi Sambi
- Tizar Purbaya as Prabu Kertanagara
- Piet Pagau as Prabu Jayakatwang (season 1) and Mpu Lunggah (season 2)
- Nungki Kusumastuti as Nararya Turukbali
- Hadi Leo as Lembu Sora
- Herbi Latul as Ranggalawe
- Candy Satrio as Patih Nambi
- Rayvaldo Luntungan as Rakai Dukut dan Dyah Halayudha
- Rizal Muhaimin as Ardharaja (season 1) and Ra Tanca (season 2)
- Johan Saimima as Patih Kebo Mundarang
- Irgy Ahmad Fahrezi as Prabu Jayanagara
- Hans Wanaghi as Meng Chi
- Wingky Harun as Ki Tamparowang
- Dian Sitoresmi as Nini Ragarunting
- Lilis Suganda as Ayu Pupuh/Dewi Tunjung Biru (season 1) and Tribhuwaneswari 2 (season 2)
- Teddy Uncle as Pranaraja (season 1) and Mpu Wahana (season 2)
- Rizal Djibran as Ra Kuti
- Febriyanti as Gayatri Rajapatni
- Dhini Aminarti as Tribhuwana Wijayatunggadewi
- Yuni Sulistyawati as Palastri (season 1), Luh Jinggan (season 2), and Sitangsu (season 2)
- Wulan Guritno as Praharsini
- Trixie Fadriane Etheim as Young Ayu Wandira
- Suzanna Meilia as Sunggi (season 1), Dyah Dara Pethak (season 2), and Ayu Wandira (season 2)
- Benny Burnama as Ki Pamungsu
- Bambang Suryo as Arya Wiraraja
- Rendy Ricky Bramasta as Banyak Kapuk
- Deonardus as Jambunada
- M. Iqbal as Young Panji Ketawang
- Sawung Sembadha as Panji Ketawang
- Rizal Fadli as Figuran (season 1), Balunghura (season 1)and Panji Ketawang (season 2)
- Eddy Dhosa as Kuda Prana
- Rifky Alfarez as Gajah Mada
- David Macpal as Dangdi
- Anne J. Cotto as Mertaraga
- Irman F.R. Heryana as Lanang Dhanapala
- Aspar Paturusi as Rekyan Wuru
- S. Manan Dipa as Ramapati (season 1), Mpu Sasi (season 2), and Rakai Pamitihan (season 2)
- Fitria Anwar as Kurantil
- Tien Kadaryono as Nyi Pamiji
- Alex Bernard as Kebo Kluyur (season 1) and Wong Yin (season 2)
- Andre Yega as Adirasa (season 1) and Jarawaha (season 2)
- Nani Somanegara as Nyi Rongkot
- Antoni Sumadi as Ki Sugatabrahma
- Rochim Lahatu as Kebo Anabrang (season 1 dan 2) and Jabung Tarewes (season 2)
- Tanase as Gajah Pagon (season 1)
- Zainal Pattikawa as Jaran Lejong (season 1) and Ra Wedeng (season 2)
- Norman Syam as Jarawaha (season 1), Gajah Biru (season 1 dan 2), and Ra Yuyu 2 (season 2)
- Garnis Pangandaran as Langkir (season 1), dan Trisura (season 2)
- Steven Sakari as Wong Chau
- Ricky Husada as Chan Pie
- Land Sudirman Piyana as Linggapati
- Abhie Cancer as Kau Hsing 2
- Lilis Puspitasari as Werdamurti (season 1) and Jangir (season 2)
- Prie Panggie as Ra Kawi (season 1), and Walikadep (season 2)
- Krisno Bossa as Ki Bokor
- Uliasari as Retno Palupi
- Syamsul Gondo as Wirot
- Aldona Toncic as Tabib

== Synopsis ==
The story began when Kamandanu, a blacksmith's second son, was interested to an old sage, Ranubhaya who was an expert in martial arts. He started to study martial arts from Ranubhaya and learned that Ranubhaya was actually his father's schoolmate in weaponry. While Kamandanu's father chose to be a weapon supplier to government—at the time: Kingdom Singhasari, Ranubhaya chose to not cooperate with the government and isolate himself.

When the father learn the teacher-student relationship between his second son and Ranubhaya, he became angry and accused Ranubhaya as traitor and used the government army to attack Ranubhaya's shrine. The relationship between Kamandanu and his father became worse and Kamandanu wanderer as a warrior.

The story became more complex when Ranubhaya, which had survived from his house destruction, was kidnapped by Kubilai Khan's envoy who were amazed by his expertise in weaponry. Being a prisoner in China, he was forced to make a great sword, Nagapuspa (naga means dragon). Finishing the sword, he was murdered by the official who was afraid if Ranubhaya created another sword for rival of Nagapuspa. Before his death, he asked a warrior couple, Lo Si Shan and Mei Ling, to bring the sword to Che Po (Java Island, pronounced in old-china language) and give it to Kamandanu.

The story was continued by the involvement of Kamandanu in Raden Wijaya's troop, survivors of Singhasari kingdom after being attack by Kediri kingdom. The involvement repair the relationship between Kamandanu and his father, especially after his brother, Dwipangga betrayed them. Kamandanu helped Raden Wijaya create his own kingdom, Majapahit.

Tutur Tinular was started in Kertanegara's era (last king of Singhasari) and ended in Jayanegara's era (second king of Majapahit). It began when the main character was still young and ended when the main character had already old. It shows the development from an idealist young lad to a sage who didn't want to see the war again and isolated himself.

The development of other characters were also interesting. Dwipangga for example, began his life in this story as a physically weak poet. Then, he tried to changed his life by betrayed his family for golds of Kediri. After being beaten and humiliated by his own brother in front of his wife and his son, he studied martial-art and became a scary warrior, called as Penyair Berdarah (Bleeding Poet). After beaten by Kamandanu for the second time, he disappeared and forgotten until his daughter found him as a pitiful helpless blind old man.

== Awards ==
Number	Recipients	Category	Awards	Year	Notes
01	Tutur Tinular	Penghargaan Khusus Festival Film Bandung untuk Sinetron	Festival Film Bandung	1998	Won
02	Chairil J.M.	Pemeran Pembantu Pria Drama Seri Terbaik	Festival Sinetron Indonesia 1998	1998	Won
03	Nani Somanegara	Pemeran Pembantu Wanita Drama Seri Terbaik	Festival Sinetron Indonesia 1998	1998	Nominated
