= Baim Wong =

Indonesian actor, entrepreneur and philanthropist

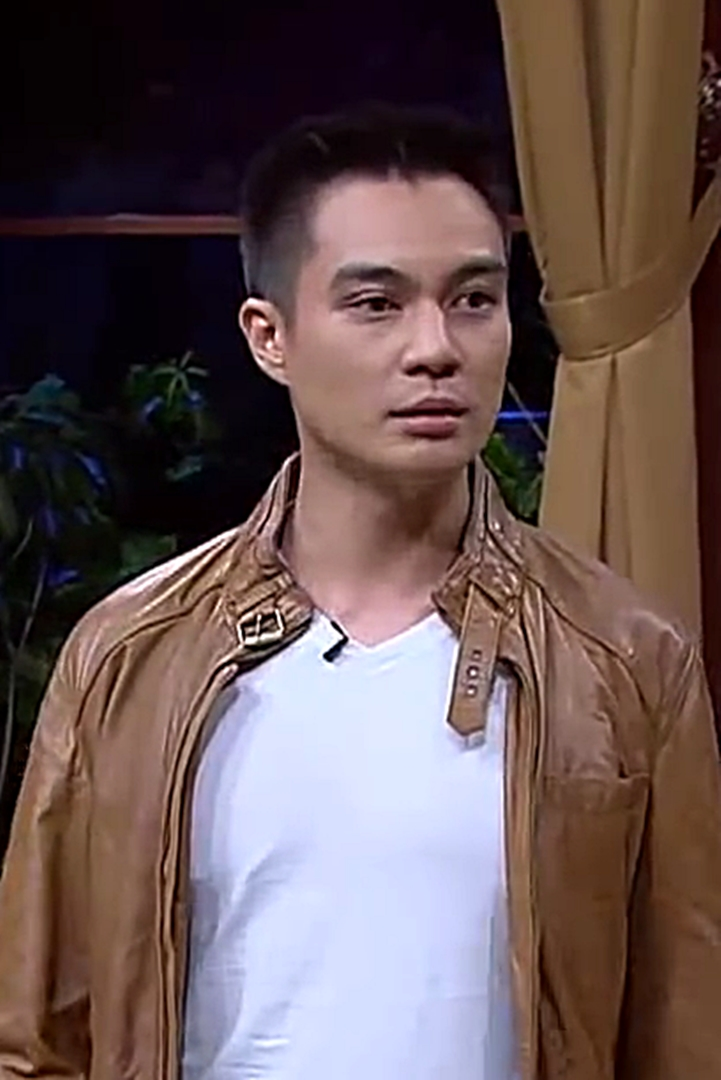
- Wong on Ini Talkshow Netmediatama
- Born: Muhammad Ibrahim; Jakarta, Indonesia
- Occupations: Celebrity, entrepreneur, writer, content creator
- Spouse: Paula Verhoeven (m. 2018)

YouTube information
- Channel: Baim Paula
- Years active: 1997–present (actor); 2018–present (YouTuber)
- Genres: Philanthropy; comedy; social experiment
- Subscribers: 21 million
- Views: 4.5 billion
- Last updated: 7 July 2021
- Website: www.baimwong.com

Muhammad Ibrahim, better known as Baim Wong, is an Indonesian YouTuber, actor, writer, entrepreneur, and content creator. He is of ethnic Chinese and Sundanese descent.

== Career ==
Wong had his first role in a soap opera in 2001, but didn't become serious about acting until 2007. The first time he played in the soap opera Cinta Hilang Cinta Kembali. After that, he played many roles in soap operas.

== Personal life ==
Wong was born in Jakarta, the youngest of five children of the couple, businessperson Johnny Wong and Kartini Marta Atmadja.

He married Indonesian model Paula Verhoeven in 2018.

== Filmography ==
=== Films ===
Year	Title	Role	Notes
2012	Dilema	Ibnu	Segmen "Garis Keras"; Won - 2012 Indonesian Movie Awards for Favorite Newcomer Actor; Nominated - 2012 Indonesian Movie Awards for Best Newcomer Actor
2015	Filosofi Kopi	Guest in coffee shop	Cameo
2015	Lily: Bunga Terakhirku	Tura	
2015	Jenderal Soedirman	Bung Karno	
2016	Sundul Gan: the Story of Kaskus	Roy	
2016	Simfoni Satu Tanda	Darsono	
2016	Pasukan Garuda: I Leave My Heart in Lebanon	Andri	
2017	Moammar Emka's Jakarta Undercover	Yoga	Nominated - 2017 Indonesian Movie Actor Awards for Best Supporting Actor; Nominated - 2017 Indonesian Movie Actor Awards for Favorite Supporting Actor
2017	Perfect Dream	Bagus	
2017	Hujan Bulan Juni	Benny	
2018	Terbang Menembus Langit	Aeik	
2018	Titisan Setan	Bara	
2018	Gentayangan	Abimanyu	
2018	Jejak Cinta	Hasan	
2018	Cahaya di Penjuru Hati		
2018	Ambu		
2019	Glorious Days	Jojo	
2021	Layla Majnun		
2023	Innocent Vengeance	Karni	Also as producer

=== Soap operas ===
Year	Title	Role	Episode	TV station
2002 - 2003	7 Tanda Cinta			SCTV
2002	Tunjuk Satu Bintang			SCTV
2005	Cinta Hilang Cinta Kembali			RCTI
2005	Jangan Berhenti Mencintaiku		91	SCTV
2006	Cincin	Jonah/Joe	160	RCTI
2006	Benci Bilang Cinta	Dimas	49	SCTV
2006	Kau Masih Kekasihku	Axel	29	RCTI
2006	Bukan Diriku	Ryo/Loki	25	RCTI
2007	Pasangan Heboh	Abhy	11	RCTI
2007	Soleha	Ervan	149	RCTI
2008	Diva	Angkasa	38	RCTI
2008	Munajah Cinta	Attar	92	RCTI
2008	Khanza		-	RCTI
2009	Dewi	Andre	120	RCTI
2009 - 2010	Kejora dan Bintang	Erlangga	72	RCTI
2010	Sejuta Cinta Marshanda	Delvin	61	RCTI
2011	Lagu Cinta Nirmala	Tessar	39	RCTI
2011-2012	Dewa	Tama	175	RCTI
2013	Cinta 7 Susun	Joe	91	RCTI
2014	Pashmina Aisha		100	RCTI
2014	Rajawali	Satria/Rajawali	28	RCTI
2014	Catatan Hati Seorang Istri	Helmy Indrayudha	274	RCTI
2016	Catatan Hati Seorang Istri 2	Fendy		RCTI
2016	Centini	Restu	222	MNCTV
2016	Malaikat Kecil dari India	Arjuna	22	ANTV
2016 - 2017	Anugerah Cinta	Choky		RCTI
2017	Tuhan Beri Kami Cinta	Reynaldi	42	SCTV
2017	Tikus dan Kucing	Ucup	11	SCTV
2017	Gali Lobang Tutup Lobang	Jamil		SCTV
2018	Utusan Dari Surga	Alif		RCTI
2019	Cinta yang Hilang	Reno		RCTI
2019	Bukan Cinta Aku	Arjuna	20	TV3

=== Television films ===
Year	Title	Role	TV station
2007	Kado Terakhir	Arman	SCTV
2013	Kerudung Dari Ustadz	Alex	RCTI
2013	Untuk Terakhir Kali	Haris	Astro Ria
2013	Ketika Bung di Ende	Bung Karno	TVRI
2014	Hari-hari Tanpa Suami	Sandy	RCTI
2015	Sumpah Saya Gatotkaca	Gatotkaca	Trans TV
2015	Cahaya Cinta Di Langit Paris	Satrio	Trans TV
2015	Assalamualaikum Paris	Satrio	Trans TV
2015	Sayembara Cinta Baim Wong	Baim Wong	Trans TV
2016	Izinkan Aku Menjadi Ibu		RCTI
2016	Dikejar Dosa Mahar		Trans7
2016	Bukan Cinta Teman Makan Teman	Wisnu	SCTV
2016	Lika - Liku Cinta Juragan Pisang	Reno	SCTV
2017	Bukan Ayah yang Mengandung	Rizal	Trans7

=== TV shows ===
Year	Title	Role	TV station
2014 - 2015	Baim Kagak Jaim	Presenter	RTV
2014 - 2015	Dahsyat	Presenter	RCTI
2015 - 2016	Biang Rumpi No Secret	Co - presenter	

=== Web series ===
Year	Title	Role	Original network
2017	The Publicist	Robert	Viu
2018	(H)ours	Bagas Nalawira	SCTV

=== Music video appearances ===
Year	Song title	Celebrity
2010	"Perawan"	Silva R. Kavadia
2011	"Mukzizat Cinta"	Indie Mice
2016	"Merinding"	Queen Aurel
