= Farida Pasha =

Indonesian actress (1952–2021)

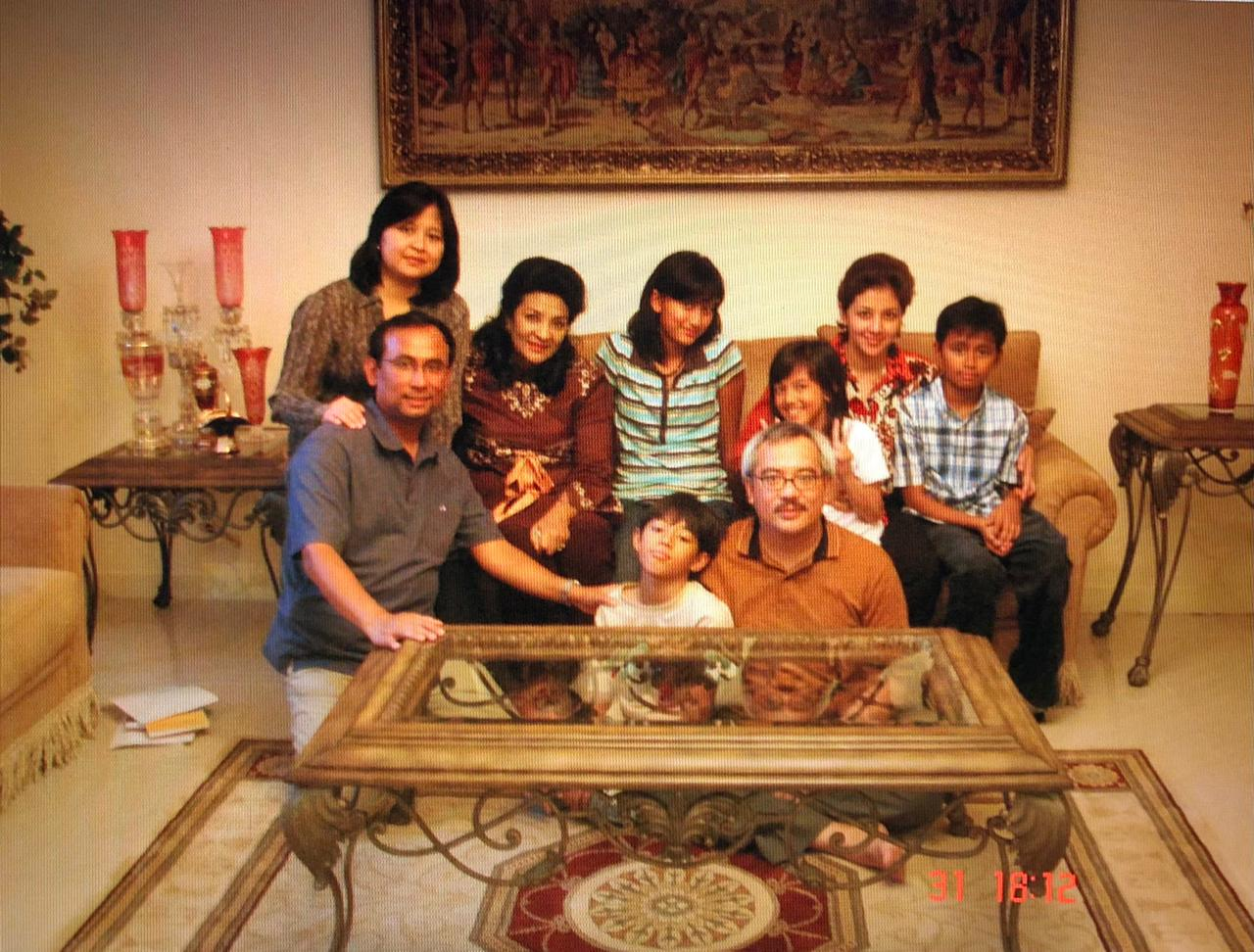
Farida Pasha, with politician Satya Widya Yudha and each other's respective families

Farida Pasha (August 21, 1952 – January 16, 2021) was an Indonesian actress who starred in more than fifty films, many in the horror genre, including Guna-Guna Istri Muda (1977), Gondoruwo (1981), Mama Minta Pulsa (2012), and The Secret: Suster Ngesot Urban Legend (2019). However, Pasha was best known to audiences for her role as Mak Lampir, the main villain in the television series, Misteri Gunung Merapi (Mystery of Mount Merapi), from 1998 to 2005.

Pasha was born in Tasikmalaya, West Java, on August 21, 1952. She was the grandmother of singer Ify Alyssa.

Farida Pasha was initially hospitalized for vertigo and early stage pneumonia, but soon tested positive for COVID-19. She died from complications of COVID-19 at Tarakan Hospital in Jakarta on January 16, 2021, aged 68.
