= Leila Chudori =

Indonesian journalist and writer

Leila S. Chudori
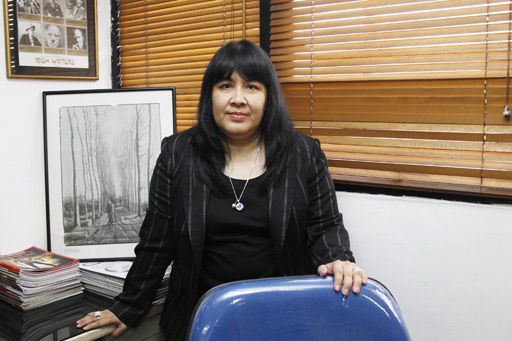
- Chudori in 2012

Leila Salikha Chudori (born December 12, 1962) is an Indonesian journalist and writer. She won the Southeast Asian Writers Award in 2020. Together with her daughter Rain Chudori, Chudori founded Peron House publishing company, which debuted in Ubud Writers and Readers Festival in 2023.

== Biography ==
Leila Salikha Chudori was born December 12, 1962, in Jakarta and grew up there. She is the daughter of Muhammad Chudori. She studied at Trent University in Ontario, Canada, graduating in 1988. She worked for the magazines Jakarta Jakarta and Tempo; the second magazine was banned by the New Order regime of President Suharto in 1994.

Her first stories were published in children's magazines Si Kuncung, Kawanku and Hai when she was only 12. Chudori later wrote scripts for the television series Dunia Tanpa Koma. She received an award for best television scriptwriter at the 2007 Bandung Film Festival. She also wrote the script for the 2008 film Drupadi. In 2009, she published a collection of stories 9 dari Nadira. In 2026, her novel The Sea Speaks His Name was adapted into a feature film of the same name, directed by Yosep Anggi Noen. She also co-wrote the screenplay with Noen.

Her daughter Rain Chudori also writes short stories.

== Selected works ==
- Malam Terakhir (The Last Night), short stories (1989)
- 9 Dari Nadira, short stories (2009)
- Pulang, novel (2012), awarded the Khatulistiwa Literary Award; translated by John H. McGlynn as Home (Deep Vellum, 2015; ISBN 1941920101)
- Laut Bercerita, novel (2018), 2020 Southeast Asian Writers Award winner; translated by John H. McGlynn as The Sea Speaks His Name (Penguin Books, 2020; ISBN 9789814882316).
