= Pengejar Angin =

- Film Poster
- Directed by: Hanung Bramantyo
- Written by: Ben Sihombing
- Produced by: Dhoni Ramadhan
- Starring: Qausar Harta Yudana; Mathias Muchus; Lukman Sardi; Giorgino Abraham
- Cinematography: Faozan Rizal
- Edited by: Wawan I Wibowo
- Distributed by: Putaar Production; Government of South Sumatra
- Release date: 3 November 2011
- Running time: 101 minutes
- Country: Indonesia
- Language: Indonesian

Pengejar Angin (The Wind Chaser) is a 2011 film by Indonesian director Hanung Bramantyo and starring Qausar Harta Yudana, Mathias Muchus, and Lukman Sardi. It tells of a young man's efforts to be able to attend university through becoming an athlete at the 2011 SEA Games. Funded in part by the government of South Sumatra, where the Games were held, the film raised criticism for its use as an advertisement.

== Plot ==
In a small village in Lahat, South Sumatra, an 18-year-old boy named Dapunta (Qausar Harta Yudana) is almost ready to graduate from senior high school; he is known as the Wind Chaser locally because of his running capabilities. He and his mother Dakunta (Wanda Hamidah) want him to go to university, but his father – the leader of a gang of bandits – refuses to allow it. Dapunta decides to go to university no matter what.

His crush Nyimas (Siti Helda) and teacher Damar (Lukman Sardi) help him, motivating him to practice his running so that he can use athletics to enter the university of his choice. However, his classmate Yusuf (Giorgino Abraham) – who has similar running abilities – is also training; he sabotages some of Dapunta's practice sessions. Meanwhile, the headmaster attempts to limit Dapunta's training out of spite for his father.

A month later, Damar's friend Ferdy (Agus Kuncoro), a trainer, comes to Lahat looking for talent to participate in the upcoming Southeast Asian Games (SEA Games). He takes on Dapunta and further trains him. After Dapunta is able to represent his country at the SEA Games in Palembang, his father relents and allows Dapunta to follow his dreams.

== Cast ==
- Qausar Harta Yudana as Dapunta
- Wanda Hamidah as Dakunta
- Siti Helda as Nyimas
- Lukman Sardi as Damar
- Agus Kuncoro as Ferdy
- Giorgino Abraham as Yusuf

== Production ==
Pengejar Angin was directed by Hanung Bramantyo, best known for his religious film Ayat-Ayat Cinta (The Verses of Love; 2008), and the young director Hestu Saputra. Qausar Harta Yudana was cast as Dapunta in his first leading role. Councillor Wanda Hamidah of the Jakarta Regional People's Representative Council (Dewan Perwakilan Rakyat Daerah) was cast as his mother Dakuta; it was also her film debut. Meanwhile, Mira Lesmana's husband Mathias Muchus was cast as Dapunta's father; for the role he gained 3 kilograms (6.6 lb) and grew a beard and moustache to seem more threatening. Most of the bit parts and extras were cast on-location.

The film was funded in part by the government of South Sumatra; the capital of the province, Palembang, was a venue at the 2011 SEA Games with the national capital Jakarta. Although Bramantyo, who generally received funding from the production house behind his films, considered the funding a blessing, he noted that several changes had to be made to the plot, including adding an emphasis on the provincial government's work towards the SEA Games (such as the Gelora Sriwijaya Stadium) and education and health-care programs. The Governor of South Sumatra, Alex Noerdin, also appeared in several scenes. The film's producer, Ramdhoni Ramadhan, described Pengejar Angin as a pilot project for "raising public awareness" of government programs in the province.

== Release and reception ==
Pengejar Angin premiered at Gandaria City in South Jakarta on 31 October 2012, with a wide release on 3 November. It did poorly in mall-based cinemas in major cities, but was warmly received in smaller cities. In June 2012, Noerdin announced that the government had set aside a portion of its yearly budget for further films promoting the region.

The film received criticism over its government funding and was called "politically biased" and "glaringly commercial" for its promotion of the SEA Games. Bramantyo, commenting after the premiere, noted that he knew he would be suspected of selling out. Lisa Siregar, writing for The Jakarta Globe, wrote that the film "discuss[ed] government health and education services with the conviction of a soap commercial". Panditio Rayendra, writing in the entertainment magazine Tabloid Bintang, found the poster reminiscent of an action or horror movie but the film surprisingly optimistic; he considered Muchus to have stolen the show with his acting.

== Awards ==
Pengejar Angin was nominated for three Citra Awards at the 2011 Indonesian Film Festival, winning one; with ? and Tendangan dari Langit (A Kick from the Sky), it was one of three films by Bramantyo in competition at the festival. At the 2012 Bandung Film Festival the film received nine nominations, winning two.

| Award | Year | Category | Recipient | Result |
|---|---|---|---|---|
| Indonesian Film Festival | 2011 | Best Supporting Actor | Mathias Muchus | Won |
| Indonesian Film Festival | 2011 | Best Cinematography | Faozan Rizal | Nominated |
| Indonesian Film Festival | 2011 | Best Editing | Wawan I Wibowo | Nominated |
| Bandung Film Festival | 2012 | Best Actor | Qausar Harta Yudana | Won |
| Bandung Film Festival | 2012 | Best Screenwriter | Ben Sihombing | Won |
