= Agus Kuncoro =

Indonesian actor (born 1972)

- Born: Agus Kuncoro Adi; 11 August 1972 (age 54); Jakarta, Indonesia
- Other name: Agus Kuncoro
- Occupation: Actor
- Years active: 1990–present
- Spouse: Anggia Jelita (m. 2005)
- Children: 1

Agus Kuncoro Adi or better known as Agus Kuncoro (born 11 August 1972) is an Indonesian actor of Javanese descent.

== Biography ==
Kuncoro was born in Jakarta, Indonesia, on 11 August 1972. He initially intended to become a sculptor and majored in it at the Jakarta Art Institute, but after hearing a sermon about Islam's view of the art he decided to become an actor. He started his career in the early 1990s with soap operas, making his feature-film debut in two action films several years later.

While continuing to act in soap operas, in 2005 Kuncoro appeared in Panggung Pinggir Kali (Stage Beside the River). His next film, Kun Fayakuun (Be, and It Is; 2008) was a religious-themed film. Kuncoro's following films, Di Bawah Langit (Under the Sky) and Sang Pencerah (The Enlightener), both released in 2010, were of a similar vein. Sang Pencerah marked Kuncoro's first film with Hanung Bramantyo.

Kuncoro played a trouble actor named Surya in Bramantyo's 2011 film ?. Originally cast in another role, Kuncoro chose the role of Surya as he identified with it. He based his acting on the mannerisms of fellow actor Mohammad Ikhsan. His next role was in another Bramantyo film, Tendangan dari Langit (Kick from the Sky), in which he played the main character's uncle. He received two nominations for Citra Award for Best Supporting Actor at the 2011 Indonesian Film Festival, one for each film, but did not win either.

The following year, Kuncoro starred in the football-themed prison drama Tim Bui, a 13-part series broadcast on Metro TV. At the 2012 Bandung Film Festival Kuncoro received Best Actor for his performance.

== Personal life ==
Kuncoro is married to the actress Anggie Jelita. They have one child, Kunkeira Gayla.

== Filmography ==
- Saur Sepuh IV (1991)
- Saur Sepuh V (1992)
- Panggung Pinggir Kali (Stage Beside The River: 2005)
- Kun Fayakuun (Be, & It Is: 2008)
- Di Bawah Langit (Under The Sky: 2010)
- Sang Pencerah (The Enlightener: 2010)
- Tendangan Dari Langit (Kick From The Sky: 2011)
- Pengejar Angin (The Wind Chaser: 2011)
- Malaikat Tanpa Sayap (Angel With Out Wings: 2012)
- Sule, I Need You (2012)
- Ambilkan Bulan (Take The Moon: 2012)
- Yasmine (2014)

== Awards and nominations ==
Year	Award	Category	Recipients	Result
2011	Indonesian Film Festival	Citra Award for Best Supporting Actor	?	Nominated
2011	Indonesian Film Festival	Citra Award for Best Supporting Actor	Tendangan dari Langit	Nominated

== Television ==
- Singgasana Brama Kumbara (1995)
- Tutur Tinular (1997)
- Misteri Gunung Merapi (2001)
