= Wawan =

Wawan is a name. People with the name include:

- Wawan Febrianto
- Wawan Widiantoro
- Wawan Hendrawan

== See also ==
- Killapa Wawan
