= Jakarta Twilight =

Jakarta Maghrib
- Film poster
- Directed by: Salman Aristo
- Screenplay by: Salman Aristo
- Produced by: Chand Parvez Servia; Salman Aristo; Reza Servia; Mithu Nisar
- Starring: Adinia Wirasti; Reza Rahadian; Indra Birowo; Widi Mulya; Fanny Fabriana; Deddy Mahendra Desta; Ringgo Agus Rahman; Lukman Sardi; Ence Bagus; Yurike Prastika; Aldo Tansani; Asrul Dahlan; Ki Daus; Sjafial Arifin
- Cinematography: Faozan Rizal
- Edited by: Cesa David Luckmansyah; Syarif Hidayat
- Music by: Zaenal Arifin; Salman Aristo
- Production company: Indie Picture
- Distributed by: Starvision Plus
- Release dates: November 2010 (Jakarta); July 27, 2011
- Running time: 85 minutes
- Country: Indonesia

Jakarta Maghrib is a 2010 Indonesian omnibus film, written, produced and directed by Salman Aristo. The film was released on July 27, 2010. It was produced by Indie Pictures. The film's plot was derived from adapted stories of real people.

== Synopsis ==
Jakarta, the capital of Indonesia, is slowly evolving into a bigger city. In the process, but along with greater activity came the stresses of modern city life. Maghrib is an attempt to capture the area at the moment when contemplation happens, at twilight, when they understand their true selves.

Iman (Indra Birowo), a security officer, came home after work. Nur (Widi Mulia), Iman's wife, is putting the baby to sleep. Seeing her do this, Iman wants to make love with her. Unfortunately, her mother sees them, telling them it's taboo to let their baby sleep at twilight. Iman is upset at his interfering mother-in-law. Iman asks Nur to live on their own in Iman's hometown, but Nur refuses. Iman leaves, angered.

Baung (Asrul Dahlan) is a local thug from Jakarta. He meets with Armen, an old man from Padang. Armen works at a mosque and runs a minimart. After a night of getting drunk, Baung talks with Armen at his minimart. Baung mocks Armen for working hard to clean the mosque. In their village the mosque is always clean, but no one prays there. At twilight, Armen suddenly had a heart attack and died. Baung, finding redemption, starts to recite adhan at the mosque, and this angers other residents.

In the afternoon, Aki is always waiting. He comes after maghrib (twilight) to sell Nasi Goreng for which he is famous. One day, Aki does not come on time, upsetting his customers: Akbar Lukman Sardi, a lawyer; Fajar (Deddy Mahendra Desta), Indra (Ringgo Agus Rahman), a doctor; Tuti (Fanny Fabriana), a journalist; and an unnamed maid. Their conversations reveal a lot of things that are wrong within their neighborhood, as well as their own hypocrisies.

Ivan (Aldo Tansani) gets out from school. He wants to play games, but there are to many players. When twilight comes, Ivan must go home and struggle with his horror story.

A man (Reza Rahadian) and a woman (Adinia Wirasti) struggle to build a relationship for 7 years. They try and fail to arrive at their to wedding organizers before twilight. The man always found ways to delay them. The woman starts having doubt upon the man's seriousness and their relationship's future.

Ba'da is the end of the story. It shows the moment each character finds their twilight self.

== Awards ==
- Indonesia Film Festival 2011

- Nominated for Best Scenario (Salman Aristo) - Nominated Best Original Scenario (Salman Aristo)

- Indonesian Movie Awards (IMA) 2012

- Best Couple (Reza Rahadian & Adinia Wirasti)

== Festivals ==
- Jakarta International Film Festival 2010
- Jogja Netpac Asian Film Festival 2010
- Hoopla! Film Festival (Singapore) 2011
- Indonesian Film Festival (Vancouver) 2011
- Silk Screen Film Festival (Pittsburgh) 2011
- Eye On Films Festival (France) 2011
- Asia - Africa Film Festival 2011
