= Surat Kecil untuk Tuhan =

- Promotional poster
- Directed by: Harris Nizam
- Written by: Beby Hasibuan
- Produced by: Sarjono Sutrisno
- Starring: Dinda Hauw; Alex Komang
- Music by: Thoersi Argeswara
- Distributed by: Skylar Pictures
- Release date: 7 July 2011
- Country: Indonesia
- Language: Indonesia

Surat Kecil untuk Tuhan (phrasal translation: A Diary of Letters to God) is a 2011 Indonesian biographical drama film directed by Harris Nizam. The film stars Dinda Hauw and Alex Komang. The film tells a story about a young girl's struggle with cancer, and it was the best-selling Indonesian film of 2011.

== Plot ==
Keke (Dinda Hauw) is a young girl with a loving father (Alex Komang) and mother, as well as loyal friends. She is diagnosed with Rhabdomyosarcoma (a cancer of connective tissues), which is unusual at her age. After undergoing twenty-five sessions of chemotherapy, the once healthy and beautiful Keke finds herself sickly and bald, with a disfigured face. Although the treatment initially works, the cancer returns a year later.

Doctors estimate that Keke has three months to live. To help her deal with her pain, she begins keeping a diary; through her writing, she finds the strength to hold on for a year. As she begins to accept her fate, she writes a letter to God in her diary, asking that her family be kept safe.

== Cast ==
- Dinda Hauw as Keke
- Alex Komang as the Father

== Production ==
This film was based on the true story of Gita Sesa Wanda Cantika, a 15-year-old student who was diagnosed with cancer and died on 25 December 2006, the first reported case of Rhabdomyosarcoma in Indonesia. The story had been reported in 2009 by a pair of bloggers known as Agnes and Davonar. These blog posts were widely read and later novelised under the name Surat Kecil untuk Tuhan; the novelisation sold 350,000 copies.

Surat was the feature film debut of Dinda Hauw. Most of the cast and crew were relatively unknown; Alex Komang was the main exception. The film was produced by Sarjono Sutrisno, of Skylar Pictures.

== Release and reception ==
Surat was released on 7 July 2011 after a press screening on two days earlier. It was the most-viewed Indonesian film of the year, seen by more than 750,000 people. (Note: In the 2000s, religious-themed films generally performed well; the Islamic-themed films Ayat-Ayat Cinta (The Verses of Love; 2007) and Ketika Cinta Bertasbih (When Love Prays; 2009) were seen by more than 3 million viewers.) This was down from previous years.

Indah Setiawati, writing for The Jakarta Post, described Surat as a "heartwarming movie about spirit, family and friendship" that would make audiences cry, despite some technical deficiencies.

== Awards ==
Surat was nominated for three Citra Awards at the 2011 Indonesian Film Festival. It did not win any. At the 2012 Indonesian Movie Awards, the film won Best Newcomer for Dinda Hauw.

| Award | Year | Category | Recipient | Result |
|---|---|---|---|---|
| Indonesian Film Festival | 2011 | Best Leading Actor | Alex Komang | Nominated |
| Indonesian Film Festival | 2011 | Best Leading Actress | Dinda Hauw | Nominated |
| Indonesian Film Festival | 2011 | Best Musical Direction | Thoersi Argeswara | Nominated |
| Indonesian Movie Awards | 2012 | Best Newcomer | Dinda Hauw | Won |
