= Hanung Bramantyo =

Indonesian film director

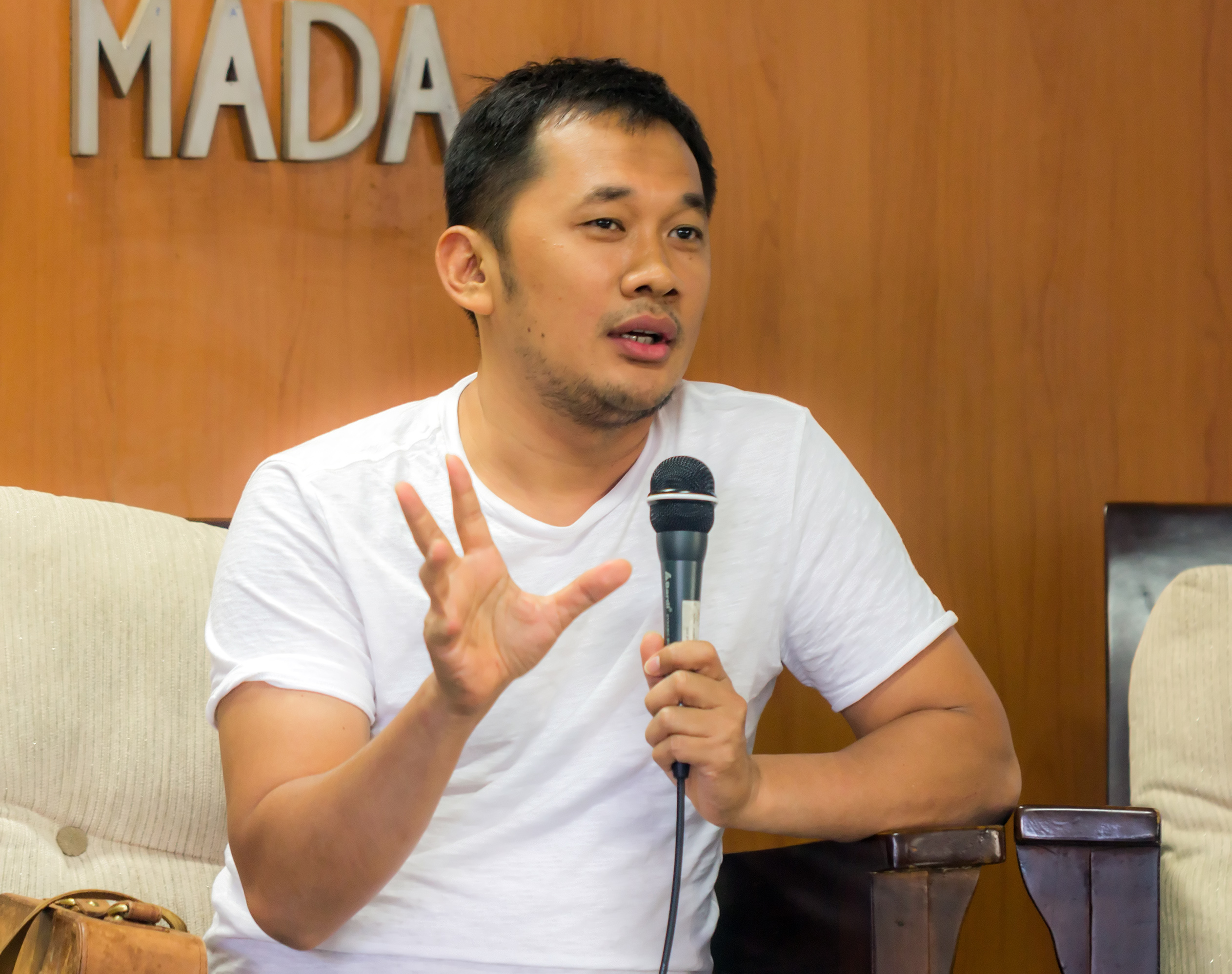
- Bramantyo speaking at the Jogja-Netpac Asian Film Festival, 2017
- Born: Setiawan Hanung Bramantyo; 1 October 1975 (age 50); Yogyakarta, Indonesia
- Education: Jakarta Art Institute
- Occupation: Director
- Years active: 1998–present
- Notable work: Ayat-Ayat Cinta ?

Setiawan Hanung Bramantyo (born 1 October 1975) is an Indonesian director known for his films ranging from teen romances to religious dramas.

After becoming interested in theatre as a child, Bramantyo made his directorial debut with the 1998 short film Tlutur. He made his feature-length debut in 2004, with Brownies. After making several commercial films, he directed the 2008 religious romance Ayat-Ayat Cinta, which was a critical and commercial success. Since then he has directed several more films with religious themes, as well as two sports-related ones.

Bramantyo's works have been noted as covering a variety of genres and political ideologies, with most of his early works being teen romances while his more recent works have been religious dramas. He has also seen controversy for his portrayal of Islam. However, his films have received numerous awards, including two Citra Awards for Best Director at the Indonesian Film Festival.

== Early life ==
Bramantyo was born in Yogyakarta, Yogyakarta on 1 October 1975 to leather importer Salim Purnomo and his wife Mulyani; he is the oldest of five children. He did his schooling in Muhammadiyah-ran schools there. While in grade school, he became interested in theatre; in his high school years, he performed Samuel Beckett's satire Waiting for Godot with his troop. After dropping out of the economics program of the Islamic University of Indonesia, Bramantyo studied at the Yogyakarta Educational and Teaching Institute (IKIP Yogyakarta). After dropping out, he moved to Jakarta, where he studied at the Jakarta Art Institute.

== Career ==
Bramantyo released his first short film, Tlutur, in 1998. It dealt with a dancer whose leg was broken by an Indonesian Communist Party member. This was followed by the television film Gelas-gelas Berdenting (Tinkling Glass) Although initially reluctant to commercial films due to peer pressure in Yogyakarta, he later drifted towards more mainstream films.

Starting with 2004's Brownies, Bramantyo's first commercial films were romantic and teen dramas. Films released during this period include Catatan Akhir Sekolah (Notes from the End of School; 2005), Jomblo (Single; 2005), the horror film Lentera Merah (Red Lantern; 2006), Kamulah Satu-Satunya (You Are the One and Only; 2007), Legenda Sundel Bolong (Legend of Sundel Bolong; 2007), and Get Married (2007).

In 2008, Bramantyo directed the Islamic romance Ayat-Ayat Cinta (Verses of Love), based on the novel of the same name by Habiburrahman El Shirazy. The film, seen by 1.5 million in its first 9 days, has been credited with starting a wave of other Islamic-themed movies. Other Islam-themed films he has directed include 2009's Perempuan Berkalung Sorban (The Girl With the Keffiyeh Around Her Neck) and 2010s Sang Pencerah (The Enlightener), a biopic of Muhammadiyah founder Ahmad Dahlan.

In January 2010, Bramantyo was called as a witness about a Ponzi scheme run by Lihan. One of Bramantyo's films, Asmaul Husna, was reported to have used profits from the scam.

In 2011, Bramantyo released the film ?, which follows three families from different religious backgrounds and carries a pluralist message. Later that year, he released two sports films: the football-themed Tendangan dari Langit (Smackdown From the Sky), and Pengejar Angin (The Wind Chaser), a film sponsored by the South Sumatran government meant to promote the 2011 Southeast Asian Games. As of November 2011, he is working on a film adaptation of Dewi Lestari's novel Perahu Kertas (Paper Boat).

== Themes ==
Bramantyo's early works were romantic comedies. His more recent films have been noted as dealing with religion's role in the modern world. In an interview with the Jakarta Globe, Bramantyo stated that he would prefer to be known as a director who "fights against stupidity and ignorance", and does not feel that he is a religious filmmaker.

Evi Mariani of The Jakarta Post notes that Bramantyo's films have been on both sides of the political spectrum, with his right-wing films more commercially successful. Bramantyo himself has said that he is "intrigued" with leftist ideology. In 2006, The Jakarta Post reported that he was working on a script based on Umar Kayam's short story Bawuk, which deals with the love between a Javanese woman and her leftist husband.

== Controversy ==
Several of Bramantyo's films have stirred controversy for how they deal with religion. Ayat-Ayat Cinta received criticism for having one of the main characters, Maria, convert from Christianity to Islam. Perempuan Berkalung Sorban was criticized by Muslim clerics, while the nomination of Sang Pencerah for best film at the Indonesian Film Festival also drew controversy, being disqualified as not fulfilling the criteria without further comment. ? received criticism from several religious groups, including the Islamic Defenders Front (Front Pembela Islam), Indonesian Ulema Council (Majelis Ulama Indonesia) and Banser (part of Nahdlatul Ulama) for its themes of pluralism and depictions of terrorism. However, Pengejar Angin received criticism as being overly promotional and commercialized.

Bramantyo tends to downplay controversy. In response to the criticism over ?, he initially tweeted that the protests were free promotion; later cutting several scenes under increased pressure. Later that year, he responded to criticism of Pengejar Angin by stating that the additional funding allowed him to tell a "local story" with a high quality film.

== Awards ==
Bramantyo has won numerous awards. His directorial debut, Tlutur, won first prize at the Jakarta Arts Council's Alternative Film Festival. Gelas-gelas Berdenting (Tinkling Glass) won third prize for television programming at the 11th Cairo International Film Festival. He has also won several Citra Awards from the Indonesian Film Festival. Brownies won Citra Award for Best Director in 2005, with Get Married doing the same in 2007.

== Personal life ==
Bramantyo has been married twice. His first marriage was to Yanesthi Hardini, with whom he had one child. The pair divorced in early 2009. He later married Indonesian soap opera actress Zaskia Adya Mecca on 14 September 2009. Together they have five children.

== Filmography ==
=== Feature and television films ===
- Topeng Kekasih (The Lover's Mask; 2000)
- Gelas-Gelas Berdenting (Tinkling Glass; 2001)
- Kidung (Song)
- Brownies (2004)
- Catatan Akhir Sekolah (Notes from the End of School; 2005)
- Sayekti dan Hanafi (Sayekti and Hanafi; 2005)
- Jomblo (Single; 2005)
- Lentera Merah (Red Lantern; 2006)
- Kamulah Satu-Satunya (You Are the One and Only; 2007)
- Legenda Sundel Bolong (Legend of Sundel Bolong; 2007)
- Get Married (2007)
- Ayat-Ayat Cinta (The Verses of Love; 2008)
- Doa yang Mengancam (Threatening Prayer; 2008)
- Perempuan Berkalung Sorban (Woman with a Turban; 2009)
- Get Married 2 (2009)
- Menebus Impian (Make Dreams Real; 2010)
- Sang Pencerah (The Enlightener; 2010)
- ? (2011)
- Tendangan dari Langit (Smackdown From the Sky; 2011)
- Pengejar Angin (The Wind Chaser; 2011)
- Perahu Kertas ("Paper Boat"; 2012)
- Perahu Kertas 2 ("Paper Boat 2"; 2012)
- Soekarno: Indonesia Merdeka
- Surga Yang Tak Dirindukan 2
- Satria Dewa: Gatotkaca
- Harlot's Prayer (2023)
- Gowok: Javanese Kamasutra (2025)
- The Hole, 309 Days to the Bloodiest Tragedy (2026)

=== Short films ===
- Tlutur (1998)
- When... (2003)
- JK (2009)

== Awards and nominations ==
Year	Award	Category	Recipients	Result
2005	Indonesian Film Festival	Citra Award for Best Director	Brownies	Won
2007	Indonesian Film Festival	Citra Award for Best Director	Get Married	Won
2009	Indonesian Film Festival	Citra Award for Best Director	Woman with a Turban	Nominated
2011	Indonesian Film Festival	Citra Award for Best Director	?	Nominated
2011	Indonesian Film Festival	Citra Award for Best Director	Tendangan dari Langit	Nominated
2012	Indonesian Film Festival	Citra Award for Best Director	Perahu Kertas	Nominated
2013	Indonesian Film Festival	Citra Award for Best Director (with Hestu Saputra)	Cinta tapi Beda	Nominated
2014	Indonesian Film Festival	Citra Award for Best Director	Soekarno	Nominated
2017	Indonesian Film Festival	Citra Award for Best Director	Kartini	Nominated
2019	Indonesian Film Festival	Citra Award for Best Director	Bumi Manusia	Nominated
