= List of 2023 box office number-one films in Indonesia =

This is a list of films which placed number one at the weekend box office for the year 2023 in Indonesia with the weekly admissions.

== Number-one films ==
†	This implies the highest-grossing movie of the year.

#	Weekend end date	Film	Weekly admissions	Weekend openings in the Top 10	Ref.
1	8 January 2023	Avatar: The Way of Water	634,692	M3GAN (#3); Alena: Anak Ratu Iblis (#7); Deadly Love Poetry (#8); Sword Art Online Progressive: Scherzo of Deep Night (#9)	
2	15 January 2023	Avatar: The Way of Water	300,302	Hidayah (#4); Plane (#5); High&Low: The Worst X (#8); Anak Titipan Setan (#9)	
3	22 January 2023	Bayi Ajaib	168,600	Sakra (#4); The Ballads of Roy (#8); Mummies (#9)	
4	29 January 2023	A Man Called Otto	221,621	Mangkujiwo 2 (#3); Operation Fortune: Ruse de Guerre (#4); Pathaan (#9)	
5	5 February 2023	A Long Way to Come Home	414,462	Tasbih Kosong (#4); Babylon (#8); The Offering (#9)	
6	12 February 2023	Maghrib Time	342,887	Titanic (re-release) (#3); High School Serenade (#6); Out of Death (#7); The Banishing (#9)	
7	19 February 2023	Ant-Man and the Wasp: Quantumania	1,647,146	The Female Followers of the Devil (#3)	
8	26 February 2023	Ant-Man and the Wasp: Quantumania	625,622	Pesugihan: Bersekutu dengan Iblis (#3); Bismillah Kunikahi Suamimu (#4); Missing (#5); The First Slam Dunk (#8); Kiko in the Deep Sea (#10)	
9	5 March 2023	Maghrib Time	403,887	Virgo and the Sparklings (#6); Fireworks (#8); Ambush (#10)	
10	12 March 2023	Suzume	402,479	Perjanjian Gaib (#4); Blood (#7)	
11	19 March 2023	Shazam! Fury of the Gods	550,400	Iblis Dalam Darah (#3); Losmen Melati (#6)	
12	26 March 2023	John Wick: Chapter 4	292,886	Jin Qorin (#7); Hantu Baru (#10)	
13	2 April 2023	John Wick: Chapter 4	420,945	Dungeons & Dragons: Honor Among Thieves (#2); Tulah 6/13 (#5); Surga Di Bawah Langit (#10)	
14	9 April 2023	The Super Mario Bros. Movie	630,784	The Pope's Exorcist (#3); Pelet Tali Pocong (#5); Air (#7)	
15	16 April 2023	Dungeons & Dragons: Honor Among Thieves	347,063	Ride On (#3); Jesus Revolution (#8)	
16	23 April 2023	Sewu Dino †	723,988	Buya Hamka Vol. 1 (#4); Khanzab (#6); Jin & Jun (#9)	
17	30 April 2023	Sewu Dino †	2,792,963	—N/a	
18	7 May 2023	Guardians of the Galaxy Vol. 3	1,383,038	Evil Dead Rise (#3); Dedemit: Diikuti Makhluk Halus (#6); Angel: Kami Semua Punya Mimpi (#9)	
19	14 May 2023	Guardians of the Galaxy Vol. 3	1,034,565	Hello Ghost (#4); Bukannya Aku Tidak Mau Nikah (#8)	
20	21 May 2023	Fast X	2,561,730	Kajiman (#6)	
21	28 May 2023	Fast X	1,404,718	The Little Mermaid (#2); Hati Suhita (#3); Jin Khodam (#5); The Ghost Station (#10)	
22	4 June 2023	Fast X	707,697	Spider-Man: Across the Spider-Verse (#3); Spirit Doll (#5)	
23	11 June 2023	Transformers: Rise of the Beasts	1,636,771	Kutukan Sembilan Setan (#7); The Boogeyman (#8); Star Syndrome (#9)	
24	18 June 2023	Transformers: Rise of the Beasts	901,196	The Flash (#2)	
25	25 June 2023	Transformers: Rise of the Beasts	495,082	Elemental (#3); Sosok Ketiga (#4); The Childe (#5); The Prize (#6); Hypnotic (#8)	
26	2 July 2023	Indiana Jones and the Dial of Destiny	418,299	Ganjil Genap (#6)	
27	9 July 2023	Mission: Impossible – Dead Reckoning Part One	734,720	Tari Kematian (#8); Kejar Mimpi Gaspol! (#10)	
28	16 July 2023	Insidious: The Red Door	1,200,708	Hidden Strike (#3)	
27	23 July 2023	Barbie	701,295	Oppenheimer (#2); Doraemon: Nobita's Sky Utopia (#6); Kutukan Peti Mati (#8)	
28	30 July 2023	Barbie	677,055	When It Stops Here (#2); Mantra Surugana (#6); The Black Demon (#7); Haunted Mansion (#9); Detective Conan: Black Iron Submarine (#10)	
29	6 August 2023	Suzzanna: Malam Jumat Kliwon	765,396	Meg 2: The Trench (#2)	
30	13 August 2023	Suzzanna: Malam Jumat Kliwon	748,917	The Moon (#4); Primbon (#6); Teenage Mutant Ninja Turtles: Mutant Mayhem (#9); Cobweb (#10)	
31	20 August 2023	Suzzanna: Malam Jumat Kliwon	384,938	Blue Beetle (#2); Catatan Si Boy (#5); Lantai 4 (#9)	
32	27 August 2023	Suzzanna: Malam Jumat Kliwon	209,011	Gran Turismo (#2); Galaksi (#4); Talk to Me (#6); Mappacci: Malam Pacar (#7)	
33	3 September 2023	The Equalizer 3	350,602	Susuk (#2); Puspa Indah Taman Hati (#10)	
34	10 September 2023	The Nun II	1,641,279	Air Mata di Ujung Sajadah (#2); Sleep Call (#7); His Only Son (#9)	
35	17 September 2023	The Nun II	1,178,712	A Haunting in Venice (#3); Aku Tahu Kapan Kamu Mati (#4); Retribution (#6)	
36	24 September 2023	Air Mata di Ujung Sajadah	942,246	Kisah Tanah Jawa: Pocong Gundul (#2); Expend4bles (#3); Satu Hari dengan Ibu (#8)	
37	1 October 2023	Petualangan Sherina 2	731,175	The Verge of Death (#4); The Creator (#6); Paw Patrol: The Mighty Movie (#8)	
38	8 October 2023	The Verge of Death	972,997	The Exorcist: Believer (#3); Bangku Kosong: Ujian Terakhir (#6)	
39	15 October 2023	The Verge of Death	873,494	Pamali: Dusun Pocong (#2); Saw X (#4); Janin Iblis Neraka (#9)	
40	22 October 2023	The Verge of Death	662,498	Indigo (#3); Killers of the Flower Moon (#6)	
41	29 October 2023	Indigo	356,005	Five Nights at Freddy's (#4); Saranjana: Kota Ghaib (#5); Freelance (#7); Wakaf (#8); Mohon Doa Restu (#9)	
42	5 November 2023	Saranjana: Kota Ghaib	441,138	Kultus Iblis (#5); Andragogy (#6)	
43	12 November 2023	The Marvels	1,371,436	Sijjin (#2)	
44	19 November 2023	Sijjin	795,929	The Hunger Games: The Ballad of Songbirds & Snakes (#3); Gampang Cuan (#4); Perjamuan Iblis (#6); Trolls Band Together (#8)	
45	26 November 2023	172 Days	787,875	Srimulat: Hidup Memang Komedi (#7); Rumah Iblis (#8); Wish (#9)	
46	3 December 2023	172 Days	1,215,025	The Haunted Hotel (#2); Falling In Love Like In Movies (#3); Napoleon (#6)	
47	10 December 2023	172 Days	680,272	Wonka (#3); Night of Hell (#5)	
48	17 December 2023	Hell Torture	544,394	The Boy and the Heron (#5); The Animal Kingdom (#8); The Dive (#10)	
49	24 December 2023	Aquaman and the Lost Kingdom	1,358,382	Layangan Putus the Movie (#3); Hamka & Siti Raham Vol. 2 (#5)	
50	31 December 2023	Aquaman and the Lost Kingdom	1,601,943	13 Bombs in Jakarta (#3); Migration (#5)	

== Highest-grossing films ==
International film Indonesian film

Highest-grossing films of 2023 (In year release)
Rank	Title	Total admissions
1	Sewu Dino	4,886,406
2	Fast X	4,811,190
3	Aquaman and the Lost Kingdom	4,011,601
4	Transformers: Rise of the Beasts	3,551,933
5	The Nun II	3,413,309
6	The Verge of Death	3,302,047
7	Air Mata Di Ujung Sajadah	3,127,861
8	172 Days	3,087,826
9	Guardians of the Galaxy Vol. 3	2,844,501
10	Ant-Man and the Wasp: Quantumania	2,828,814

== See also ==
- List of highest-grossing films in Indonesia

Preceded by 2022	2023	Succeeded by 2024
