= Citra Award for Best Adapted Screenplay =

Award given annually at the Indonesian Film Festival

- Country: Indonesia
- Presented by: Indonesian Film Festival
- First award: 2006
- Currently held by: Widya Arifianti and Sabrina Rochelle Kalangie for Home Sweet Loan (2025)
- Website: festivalfilm.id

The Citra Award for Best Adapted Screenplay (Indonesian: Piala Citra untuk Penulis Skenario Adaptasi Terbaik) is an award presented annually at the Indonesian Film Festival since 2006. Together with the Citra Award for Best Original Screenplay, it replaced the integrated Citra Award for Best Screenplay.

In 2019, Gina S. Noer became the first person to win both Best Original Screenplay and Best Adapted Screenplay in the same year for her work on Cemara's Family and Two Blue Stripes.

== Winners and nominees ==
Winners are listed first in the colored row and denoted by double dagger (‡), followed by the other nominees.

=== 2000s ===
Year	Film	Screenwriter(s)	Source material
2006 (26th)	Opera Jawa	Garin Nugroho and Armantono ‡	Ramayana
2006 (26th)	Jomblo	Salman Aristo, Adhitya Mulya, and Hanung Bramantyo	The novel by Adhitya Mulya
2007 (27th)	—N/a (Note: The category is integrated into Best Screenplay.)		
2008 (28th)	—N/a		
2009 (29th)	Mereka Bilang, Saya Monyet!	Djenar Maesa Ayu and Indra Herlambang ‡	The short stories "Lintah" and "Melukis Jendela" by Ayu
2009 (29th)	Emak Ingin Naik Haji	Aditya Gumay and Adenin Adlan	The short story by Asma Nadia
2009 (29th)	The Forbidden Door	Joko Anwar	The novel by Sekar Ayu Asmara
2009 (29th)	Jamila dan Sang Presiden	Ratna Sarumpaet	The play Pelacur dan Sang Presiden by Sarumpaet
2009 (29th)	Perempuan Berkalung Sorban	Gina S. Noer	The novel by Abidah El Khalieqy

=== 2010s ===
Year	Film	Screenwriter(s)	Source material
2010 (30th)	3 Hati Dua Dunia, Satu Cinta	Benni Setiawan ‡	The novels The Da Peci Code and Rosid & Delia by Ben Sohib
2011 (31st)	—N/a (Note: The category is split into Best Screenplay and Best Story.)		
2012 (32nd)	—N/a		
2013 (33rd)	—N/a		
2014 (34th)	The Jungle School	Riri Riza ‡	The book by Butet Manurung
2014 (34th)	3 Nafas Likas	Titien Wattimena	The biography Perempuan Tegar dari Sibolangit by Hilda Unu-Senduk
2014 (34th)	Lights from the East: I Am Maluku	Angga Dwimas Sasongko, M. Irfan Ramli, and Swastika Nohara	The biography of Sani Tawainella
2014 (34th)	The Sinking of van der Wijck	Imam Tantowi, Donny Dirgantoro, Riheam Junianti, and Sunil Soraya	The novel by Hamka
2014 (34th)	Soekarno	Hanung Bramantyo	The biography of Soekarno
2015 (35th)	Filosofi Kopi	Jenni Jusuf ‡	The book by Dewi "Dee" Lestari
2015 (35th)	The Final Note	Johansyah Jumberan and Jay Sukmo	The novel by Sam Maulana
2015 (35th)	The Heaven None Missed	Alim Sudio and Bagus Bramantyo	The novel by Asma Nadia
2015 (35th)	A Moon Hangs Above the Graveyard	Dirmawan Hatta	The 1973 film by Asrul Sani and the poem "Malam Lebaran" by Sitor Situmorang
2015 (35th)	Toba Dreams	Benni Setiawan	The novel by T. B. Silalahi
2016 (36th)	Athirah	Salman Aristo and Riri Riza ‡	The book by Alberthiene Endah
2016 (36th)	Catatan Dodol Calon Dokter	Ardiansyah Solaiman and Chadijah Masturi Siregar	The novel by Ferdiriva Hamzah
2016 (36th)	My Stupid Boss	Upi Avianto	The novel by Chaos@work
2016 (36th)	Ngenest	Ernest Prakasa	The novel by Prakasa
2016 (36th)	Rudy Habibie	Gina S. Noer and Hanung Bramantyo	The novel Rudy: Kisah Masa Muda Sang Visioner by Noer
2017 (37th)	Night Bus	Rahabi Mandra and Teuku Rifnu Wikana ‡	The short story "Selamat" by Wikana
2017 (37th)	Galih & Ratna	Fathan Todjon and Lucky Kuswandi	The novel Gita Cinta dari SMA by Eddy D. Iskandar
2017 (37th)	Kartini	Bagus Bramanti and Hanung Bramantyo	The biography of R.A. Kartini
2017 (37th)	Satan's Slaves	Joko Anwar	The 1980 film by Sisworo Gautama Putra
2017 (37th)	Sweet 20	Upi Avianto	The film Miss Granny by Hwang Dong-hyuk
2018 (38th)	Aruna & Her Palate	Titien Wattimena ‡	The novel by Laksmi Pamuntjak
2018 (38th)	#FriendsButMarried	Johanna Wattimena and Upi Avianto	The novel by Ayudia Bing Slamet and Ditto Percussion
2018 (38th)	Si Doel The Movie	Rano Karno	Characters from the television series Si Doel Anak Sekolahan by Karno
2019 (39th)	Cemara's Family	Gina S. Noer and Yandy Laurens ‡	The television series by Arswendo Atmowiloto
2019 (39th)	Glorious Days	Mira Lesmana and Gina S. Noer	The film Sunny by Kang Hyeong-cheol
2019 (39th)	Gundala	Joko Anwar	The comic character by Harya Suraminata
2019 (39th)	My Stupid Boss 2	Upi Avianto	The novel by Chaos@work
2019 (39th)	Si Doel The Movie 2	Rano Karno	Characters from the television series Si Doel Anak Sekolahan by Karno

=== 2020s ===
Year	Film	Screenwriter(s)	Source material
2020 (40th)	Imperfect	Ernest Prakasa and Meira Anastasia ‡	The book by Anastasia
2020 (40th)	The Queen of Black Magic	Joko Anwar	The 1981 film by Lilik Sudjio
2021 (41st)	The Heartbreak Club	Gea Rexy, Bagus Bramanti, and Charles Gozali	The biography of Didi Kempot
2021 (41st)	Asih 2	Lele Laila	The novel Asih by Risa Saraswati
2021 (41st)	Generasi 90an: Melankolia	M. Irfan Ramli	The book by Marchella FP
2021 (41st)	Layla Majnun	Alim Sudio	The story by Nizami Ganjavi
2022 (42nd)	Vengeance Is Mine, All Others Pay Cash	Edwin and Eka Kurniawan	The novel by Kurniawan
2022 (42nd)	Before, Now & Then	Kamila Andini and Ahda Imran	The novel Jais Darga Namaku by Imran
2022 (42nd)	Losmen Bu Broto	Alim Sudio	Characters from the television series Losmen by Tatiek Maliyati and Wahyu Sihombing
2022 (42nd)	Miracle in Cell No. 7	Alim Sudio	The film by Lee Hwan-kyung
2022 (42nd)	The Red Point of Marriage	Sabrina Rochelle Kalangie and Titien Wattimena	Characters from the television series by Buce Malawau
2023 (43rd)	24 Hours with Gaspar	M. Irfan Ramli ‡	The novel by Sabda Armandio
2023 (43rd)	A Long Way to Come Home	M. Irfan Ramli and Angga Dwimas Sasongko	The novel Nanti Kita Cerita Tentang Hari Ini by Marchella FP
2023 (43rd)	Buya Hamka Vol. 1	Alim Sudio and Cassandra Massardi	The novel by A. Fuadi
2023 (43rd)	Fireworks	Alim Sudio	The film 3ft Ball & Souls by Yoshio Kato
2023 (43rd)	Sri Asih	Joko Anwar and Upi Avianto	The character from the comic books by R.A. Kosasih
2024 (44th)	Petualangan Sherina 2	Jujur Prananto, Mira Lesmana, Riri Riza, and Virania Munaf‡	The characters from the film Petualangan Sherina by Prananto
2024 (44th)	The Architecture of Love	Alim Sudio and Ika Natassa	The novel by Natassa
2024 (44th)	Harlot's Prayer	Ifan Ismail	The novel Tuhan Izinkan Aku Menjadi Pelacur! by Muhiddin M. Dahlan
2024 (44th)	Ipar Adalah Maut	Oka Aurora	The story by Elizasifaa
2024 (44th)	Two Blue Hearts	Gina S. Noer	The characters from the film Two Blue Stripes by Noer
2025 (45th)	Home Sweet Loan	Widya Arifianti and Sabrina Rochelle Kalangie‡	The novel by Almira Bastari
2025 (45th)	A Brother and 7 Siblings	Yandy Laurens	The television series by Arswendo Atmowiloto
2025 (45th)	Qodrat 2	Asaf Antariksa, Gea Rexy, and Charles Gozali	The characters from the film Qodrat by Antariksa, Rexy, and Gozali
2025 (45th)	Sore: Wife from the Future	Yandy Laurens	The web series by Laurens
2025 (45th)	This City Is a Battlefield	Mouly Surya	The novel A Road with No End by Mochtar Lubis
