= Citra Award for Best Picture =

Award given annually at the Indonesian Film Festival

- Awarded for: Best motion picture of the year
- Country: Indonesia
- Presented by: Indonesian Film Festival
- First award: 1955
- Currently held by: On Your Lap (2025)
- Website: festivalfilm.id

The Citra Award for Best Picture (Indonesian: Film Cerita Panjang Terbaik) is an award given at the Indonesian Film Festival (FFI) to the best feature film of the year. The Citra Awards, described by Screen International as "Indonesia's equivalent to the Oscars", are the country's most prestigious film awards and are intended to recognize achievements in films as well as to draw public interest to the film industry.

Drama film On Your Lap is the most recent winner at the 2025 ceremony.

== History ==
The Citra Awards, then known as the Indonesian Film Festival Awards, were first given in 1955 to co-winners Usmar Ismail's Lewat Djam Malam and Lilik Sudjio's Tarmina. The two-way tie, also found in the Best Actor and Best Actress categories, was controversial as film critics considered Lewat Djam Malam the superior film, leading to allegations that producer Djamaluddin Malik had bought Tarmina's prize. Succeeding festivals were held in 1960 and 1967 and annually since 1973. There were no Citra Awards given between 1993 and 2003 due to sharp decline in domestic film production. It was reinstated as an annual event in 2004 after receiving funds from the Indonesian government.

The Best Picture category is considered the most important Citra Award at the Indonesian Film Festival. It is often regarded as the domestic film industry's standard of the year's best motion picture, which takes into account the overall production of a film, including the directing, performances, scoring, writing, music, sound mixing, cinematography, art direction, and editing.

Marlina the Murderer in Four Acts won Best Picture in 2018 with an overall 10 awards out of 15 nominations, garnering the most wins and most nominations of all time. Prior to that, both records were held by 1986 Best Picture winner Mother with an overall 9 awards out of 10 nominations. The record for most nominations was later broken by 2020 Best Picture winner Impetigore with 17 nominations. In 2023, Andragogy tied the record by receiving 17 nominations.

Upon winning in 2007, Nagabonar Jadi 2 became the first, and as of 2020 the only, sequel to have won Best Picture. Its first film Nagabonar also won Best Picture twenty years prior in 1987.

In 1967, 1977, and 1984, no Best Picture awards were given. In 1967 and 1977, the decision was made because the jury found the films in contention to be underwhelming, meanwhile in 1984 the decision was caused by an error made by the organizing committee who mishandled the envelope containing the jury's Best Picture winner selection. In 1980, Arifin C. Noer's Yuyun in the Mental Hospital, licensed as a documentary film, was nominated for Best Picture, a decision that was scrutinized by film critics at the time.

The award has been revoked once, in 2007, following strong criticisms from other filmmakers over 2006 Best Picture winner Ekskul's unauthorized use of copyrighted materials from the 2000 film Gladiator and the 2005 film Munich.

== Winners and nominees ==
Winners are highlighted in blue and listed in bold.

=== 1950s ===
Year	Film	Director	Studio
**1955** (1st)	**Lewat Djam Malam** **TIE**	**Usmar Ismail**	**Perfini, Persari**
**1955** (1st)	**Tarmina** **TIE**	**Lilik Sudjio**	**Persari**
1956	NOT HELD		
1957	NOT HELD		
1958	NOT HELD		
1959	NOT HELD		

=== 1960s ===
Year	Film	Director	Studio
**1960** (2nd)	**Turang**	Bachtiar Siagian	Rentjong Film Corp, Refic Film
1961	NOT HELD		
1962	NOT HELD		
1963	NOT HELD		
1964	NOT HELD		
1965	NOT HELD		
1966	NOT HELD		
**1967** (3rd)	**NO WINNER**		
1968	NOT HELD		
1969	NOT HELD		

=== 1970s ===
Year	Film	Director	Studio
1970	NOT HELD		
1971	NOT HELD		
1972	NOT HELD		
**1973** (4th)	**Perkawinan**	**Wim Umboh**	**Aries Raya International, Far Eastern Film Co**
**1974** (5th)	**Cinta Pertama** TIE	**Teguh Karya**	**Jelajah Film**
**1974** (5th)	**Si Mamad** TIE	**Sjumandjaja**	**Matari Film**
**1975** (6th)	**Senyum di Pagi Bulan Desember**	**Wim Umboh**	**International Aries Angkasa Film**
**1976** (7th)	**Cinta**	**Wim Umboh**	**Aries-Insantra Film**
**1977** (8th)	**NO WINNER**		
**1978** (9th)	**Jakarta Jakarta**	**Ami Prijono**	**Kamasutra Film**
**1979** (10th)	**November 1828**	**Teguh Karya**	**Interstudio**
**1979** (10th)	Pengemis dan Tukang Becak	Deddy Armand	Jaya Bersaudara Film
**1979** (10th)	Binalnya Anak Muda	Ismail Soebardjo	Gemini Satria Film
**1979** (10th)	Gara-Gara Istri Muda	Wahyu Sihombing	Kamasutra Film
**1979** (10th)	Kemelut Hidup	Asrul Sani	Tridharma Bhakti Film

=== 1980s ===
Year	Film	Director	Studio
**1980** (11th)	**Perawan Desa**	**Frank Rorimpandey**	**Safari Sinar Sakti Film**
**1980** (11th)	Harmonikaku	Arifin C. Noer	PPFN
**1980** (11th)	Rembulan dan Matahari	Slamet Rahardjo	Dharma Putra Jaya Film
**1980** (11th)	Yuyun in the Mental Hospital	Arifin C. Noer	PPFN
**1981** (12th)	**Perempuan dalam Pasungan**	**Ismail Soebardjo**	**Garuda Film**
**1981** (12th)	Para Perintis Kemerdekaan	Asrul Sani	Taty & Sons Jaya Film
**1981** (12th)	Gadis Penakluk	Eduart Pesta Sirait	Garuda Film
**1981** (12th)	Usia 18	Teguh Karya	Garuda Film, Interstudio, Dharma Putra Jaya Film
**1982** (13th)	**Serangan Fajar**	**Arifin C. Noer**	**PPFN**
**1982** (13th)	Bawalah Aku Pergi	MT Risyaf	Bola Dunia Film
**1982** (13th)	Jangan Ambil Nyawaku	Sophan Sophiaan	Garuda Film, Sanggar Film
**1983** (14th)	**Di Balik Kelambu**	**Teguh Karya**	**Sukma Putra Film**
**1983** (14th)	RA Kartini	Sjumandjaja	Nusantara Film
**1983** (14th)	Roro Mendut	Ami Prijono	Gramedia Film, Sanggar Film, Elang Perkasa Film
**1983** (14th)	Titian Serambut Dibelah Tujuh	Chaerul Umam	KOFINA
**1984** (15th)	**NO WINNER**		
**1984** (15th)	Ponirah Terpidana	Slamet Rahardjo	Suka Putra Film
**1984** (15th)	Budak Nafsu	Sjumandjaja	Soraya Intercine Film
**1984** (15th)	Pengkhianatan G30S/PKI	Arifin C. Noer	PPFN
**1984** (15th)	Sunan Kalijaga	Sofyan Sharna	Tobali Indah Film, Empat Gajah Film
**1984** (15th)	Yang	Ami Prijono	Gramedia Film
**1985** (16th)	**Kembang Kertas**	**Slamet Rahardjo**	**Nusantara Film**
**1985** (16th)	Doea Tanda Mata	Teguh Karya	Citra Jaya Film
**1985** (16th)	Kerikil-Kerikil Tajam	Sjumandjaja	Bola Dunia Film
**1985** (16th)	Secangkir Kopi Pahit	Teguh Karya	Sukma Putra Film
**1985** (16th)	Serpihan Mutiara Retak	Wim Umboh	Virgo Putra Film
**1986** (17th)	**Ibunda**	**Teguh Karya**	**Satria Perkasa Esthetika Film, Sufin**
**1986** (17th)	Opera Jakarta	Sjumandjaja	Gramedia Film
**1986** (17th)	Matahari-Matahari	Arifin C. Noer	Gramedia Film
**1986** (17th)	Kejarlah Daku Kau Kutangkap	Chaerul Umam	Prasidi Teta Film
**1986** (17th)	Bila Saatnya Tiba	Eduard Pesta Sirait	Kanta Indah Film
**1987** (18th)	**Nagabonar**	**MT Risyaf**	**Prasidi Teta Film**
**1987** (18th)	Kodrat	Slamet Rahardjo	Multi Permai Film
**1987** (18th)	Biarkan Bulan Itu	Arifin C. Noer	Rapi Films
**1987** (18th)	Cintaku di Rumah Susun	Nya' Abbas Akup	Parkit Film
**1987** (18th)	Arini, Masih Ada Kereta yang Akan Lewat	Sophan Sophiaan	Sanggar Film, Elang Prakasa Film
**1988** (19th)	**Tjoet Nja' Dhien**	**Eros Djarot**	**Kanta Indah Film**
**1988** (19th)	Ayahku	Misbach Yusa Biran	Prasidi Teta Film
**1988** (19th)	Istana Kecantikan	Wahyu Sihombing	Tobali Indah Film
**1989** (20th)	**Pacar Ketinggalan Kereta**	**Teguh Karya**	**Perfini**
**1989** (20th)	Tragedi Bintaro	Buce Malawau	Safari Sinar Sakti Film
**1989** (20th)	Semua Sayang Kamu	Ida Farida	Sinar Permatamas Film
**1989** (20th)	Si Badung	Imam Tantowi	Kanta Indah Film
**1989** (20th)	Noesa Penida	Galeb Husein	Prasidi Tera Film, Melur Film Production

=== 1990s ===
Year	Film	Director	Studio
**1990** (21st)	**Taksi**	**Arifin C. Noer**	**Raviman Film**
**1990** (21st)	Langitku Rumahku	Slamet Rahardjo	Ekapraya Film
**1990** (21st)	Cas Cis Cus	Putu Wijaya	Prasidi Teta Film
**1990** (21st)	Sesaat dalam Pelukan	Sophan Sophiaan	Parkit Film, Cahaya Lampung Film
**1990** (21st)	Joe Turun ke Desa	Chaerul Umam	Virgo Putra Film
**1991** (22nd)	**Cinta dalam Sepotong Roti**	**Garin Nugroho**	**Prasidi Teta Film, Eranusa Film**
**1991** (22nd)	Lagu untuk Seruni	Labbes Widar	Sinema Utama Film
**1991** (22nd)	Langit Kembali Biru	Dimas Haring & S. Dias Ximenes	Bola Dunia Film
**1991** (22nd)	Potret	Buce Malawau	Ratna Mutiara Indah Film
**1991** (22nd)	Soerabaia 45	Imam Tantowi	Sinar Permataemas Film
**1992** (23rd)	**Ramadhan and Ramona**	**Chaerul Umam**	**Citra Wiwitan Film**
**1992** (23rd)	Bibir Mer	Arifin C. Noer	Cinta Nusa Bhakti Film
**1992** (23rd)	Plong (Naik Daun)	Putu Wijaya	Mutiara Eranusa Film, Prasidi Teta Film
**1992** (23rd)	Nada dan Dakwah	Chaerul Umam	Bola Dunia Film
**1992** (23rd)	Kuberikan Segalanya	Galeb Husein	Indoasia Rekaperkasa Film
1993	NOT HELD		
1994	NOT HELD		
1995	NOT HELD		
1996	NOT HELD		
1997	NOT HELD		
1998	NOT HELD		
1999	NOT HELD		

=== 2000s ===
Year	Film	Director	Studio
2000	NOT HELD		
2001	NOT HELD		
2002	NOT HELD		
2003	NOT HELD		
**2004** (24th)	**Arisan!**	**Nia Dinata**	**Kalyana Shira Films**
**2004** (24th)	Pasir Berbisik	Nan Achnas	Salto Films, Camila Internusa Films, NHK
**2004** (24th)	Ada Apa dengan Cinta?	Rudy Soedjarwo	Miles Films
**2004** (24th)	Marsinah: Cry Justice	Slamet Rahardjo	Gedam Sinemuda Perkasa
**2004** (24th)	Eliana, Eliana	Riri Riza	Miles Films
**2005** (25th)	**Gie**	**Riri Riza**	**Miles Films**
**2005** (25th)	Janji Joni	Joko Anwar	Kalyana Shira Films
**2005** (25th)	Ketika	Deddy Mizwar	Demi Gisela Citra Sinema
**2005** (25th)	Virgin	Hanny Saputra	Kharisma Starvision Plus
**2005** (25th)	Brownies	Hanung Bramantyo	SinemArt
**2006** (26th)	~~**Ekskul**~~ REVOKED (Note: The award was revoked in 2007 due to copyright violation found in the film.)	**~~Nayato Fio Nuala~~**	**~~Indika Entertainment~~**
**2006** (26th)	Denias, Senandung di Atas Awan	John de Rantau	Alenia Pictures
**2006** (26th)	Heart	Hanny Saputra	Kharisma Starvision Plus
**2006** (26th)	Mendadak Dangdut	Rudy Soedjarwo	SinemArt
**2006** (26th)	Ruang	Teddy Soeriaatmadja	Parama Entertainment
**2007** (27th)	**Nagabonar Jadi 2**	**Deddy Mizwar**	**Demi Gisela Citra Sinema**
**2007** (27th)	Kamulah Satu-Satunya	Hanung Bramantyo	Oreima Films
**2007** (27th)	Mengejar Mas-Mas	Rudy Soedjarwo	Depic Productions
**2007** (27th)	Merah Itu Cinta	Rako Prijanto	Rapi Films
**2007** (27th)	Get Married	Hanung Bramantyo	Kharisma Starvision Plus
**2008** (28th)	**Fiksi.**	**Mouly Surya**	**Cinesurya Productions**
**2008** (28th)	Claudia/Jasmine	Awi Suryadi	Nation Pictures
**2008** (28th)	May	Viva Westi	Flix Pictures
**2008** (28th)	Under the Tree	Garin Nugroho	Credo Pictures
**2008** (28th)	3 Doa 3 Cinta	Nurman Hakim	TriXimages
**2009** (29th)	**Identitas**	**Aria Kusumadewa**	**Tit's Film Workshop**
**2009** (29th)	Mereka Bilang, Saya Monyet!	Djenar Maesa Ayu	Intimasi Productions
**2009** (29th)	Perempuan Berkalung Sorban	Hanung Bramantyo	Kharisma Starvision Plus
**2009** (29th)	Ruma Maida	Teddy Soeriaatmadja	Lamp Pictures
**2009** (29th)	Jamila dan Sang Presiden	Ratna Sarumpaet	MVP Pictures

=== 2010s ===
Year	Film	Director	Studio
**2010** (30th)	**3 Hati Dua Dunia, Satu Cinta**	**Benni Setiawan**	**Mizan Productions**
**2010** (30th)	Alangkah Lucunya (Negeri Ini)	Deddy Mizwar	Demi Gisela Citra Sinema
**2010** (30th)	Minggu Pagi di Victoria Park	Lola Amaria	Lantip Binathoro Panuluh
**2010** (30th)	7 Hati 7 Cinta 7 Wanita	Robby Ertanto	Anak Negeri Films
**2010** (30th)	I Know What You Did on Facebook	Awi Suryadi	Pundimas Mahakarya Sejahtera
**2011** (31st)	**Sang Penari**	**Ifa Isfansyah**	**Salto Films**
**2011** (31st)	?	Hanung Bramantyo	Dapur Film, Mahaka Pictures
**2011** (31st)	Masih Bukan Cinta Biasa	Benni Setiawan	WannaB Pictures
**2011** (31st)	Tendangan dari Langit	Hanung Bramantyo	SinemArt
**2011** (31st)	The Mirror Never Lies	Kamila Andini	Set Film, World Wildlife Fund
**2012** (32nd)	**Tanah Surga... Katanya**	**Herwin Novianto**	**Demi Gisela Citra Sinema**
**2012** (32nd)	Demi Ucok	Sammaria Simanjuntak	Kepompong Gendut, Royal Cinema Multimedia
**2012** (32nd)	Lovely Man	Teddy Soeriaatmadja	Karuna Pictures
**2012** (32nd)	Rumah di Seribu Ombak	Erwin Arnada	Tabia Films, Winmark Picture
**2012** (32nd)	Soegija	Garin Nugroho	Studio Audio Visual Puskat
**2013** (33rd)	**Sang Kiai**	**Rako Prijanto**	**Rapi Films**
**2013** (33rd)	5 cm	Rizal Mantovani	Soraya Intercine Films
**2013** (33rd)	Belenggu	Upi Avianto	Falcon Pictures
**2013** (33rd)	Habibie & Ainun	Faozan Rizal	MD Pictures
**2013** (33rd)	Laura & Marsha	Dinna Jasanti	Inno Maleo Films
**2014** (34th)	**Cahaya Dari Timur: Beta Maluku**	**Angga Dwimas Sasongko**	**Visinema Pictures**
**2014** (34th)	3 Nafas Likas	Rako Prijanto	Oreima Films
**2014** (34th)	Sebelum Pagi Terulang Kembali	Lasja F. Susantyo	Cangkir Kopi Production
**2014** (34th)	Soekarno	Hanung Bramantyo	Dapur Film
**2014** (34th)	Sokola Rimba	Riri Riza	Visi Lintas Films
**2015** (35th)	**Siti**	**Eddie Cahyono**	**Four Colours Films**
**2015** (35th)	A Copy of My Mind	Joko Anwar	CJ Entertainment, Lo-Fi Flicks
**2015** (35th)	Guru Bangsa: Tjokroaminoto	Garin Nugroho	Picklock Production
**2015** (35th)	Mencari Hilal	Ismail Basbeth	MVP Pictures, Studio Denny JA, Dapur Film, Argi Film, Mizan Productions
**2015** (35th)	Toba Dreams	Benni Setiawan	TB Silalahi Center
**2016** (36th)	**Athirah**	**Riri Riza**	**Miles Films**
**2016** (36th)	Aisyah: Biarkan Kami Bersaudara	Herwin Novianto	Film One Productions
**2016** (36th)	Rudy Habibie	Hanung Bramantyo	MD Pictures
**2016** (36th)	Salawaku	Pritagita Arianegara	Kamala Film Productions
**2016** (36th)	Letters from Prague	Angga Dwimas Sasongko	Visinema Pictures
**2017** (37th)	**Night Bus**	**Emil Heradi**	**Nightbus Pictures, Kaninga Pictures**
**2017** (37th)	Check the Store Next Door	Ernest Prakasa	Kharisma Starvision Plus
**2017** (37th)	Kartini	Hanung Bramantyo	Legacy Pictures, Screenplay Films
**2017** (37th)	Satan's Slaves	Joko Anwar	Rapi Films
**2017** (37th)	Posesif	Edwin	Palari Films
**2018** (38th)	**Marlina the Murderer in Four Acts**	**Mouly Surya**	**Cinesurya Productions**
**2018** (38th)	Aruna & Her Palate	Edwin	Palari Films
**2018** (38th)	The Seen and Unseen	Kamila Andini	Four Colours Films
**2018** (38th)	Sultan Agung Mataram 1628	Hanung Bramantyo	Mooryati Soedibyo Cinema
**2019** (39th)	**Memories of My Body**	**Garin Nugroho**	**Four Colours Films, GoStudio**
**2019** (39th)	27 Steps of May	Ravi L. Bharwani	Green Glow Pictures, GoStudio
**2019** (39th)	This Earth of Mankind	Hanung Bramantyo	Falcon Pictures
**2019** (39th)	Two Blue Stripes	Gina S. Noer	Kharisma Starvision Plus, Wahana Kreator Nusantara
**2019** (39th)	Cemara's Family	Yandy Laurens	Visinema Pictures

=== 2020s ===
Year	Film	Director	Studio
**2020** (40th)	**Impetigore**	**Joko Anwar**	**BASE Entertainment, Ivanhoe Pictures, CJ Entertainment, Rapi Films**
**2020** (40th)	The Science of Fictions	Yosep Anggi Noen	Angka Fortuna Sinema, Kawankawan Media, Limaenam Films, Astro Shaw, Goplay, Focused Equipment
**2020** (40th)	Humba Dreams	Riri Riza	Miles Films
**2020** (40th)	Imperfect	Ernest Prakasa	Kharisma Starvision Plus
**2020** (40th)	Homecoming	Adriyanto Dewo	Relate Films, Lifelike Pictures
**2020** (40th)	Susi Susanti: Love All	Sim F	Time International Films, DAMN! I Love Indonesia Movies, Oreima Pictures, East West Synergy, Melon Indonesia, Buddy Buddy Pictures
**2021** (41st)	**Photocopier**	**Wregas Bhanuteja**	**Rekata Sudio, Kaninga Pictures**
**2021** (41st)	Ali & Ratu Ratu Queens	Lucky Kuswandi	Palari Films
**2021** (41st)	Cinta Bete	Roy Lolang	Inno Maleo Films
**2021** (41st)	Angel Finds Wings	Aria Kusumadewa	MD Pictures, Citra Sinema
**2021** (41st)	Paranoia	Riri Riza	Miles Films
**2021** (41st)	Preman: Silent Fury	Randolph Zaini	Introversy, Cineria
**2021** (41st)	Yuni	Kamila Andini	Fourcolours Films, Akanga Film Asia, Manny Films, Starvision
**2022** (42nd)	**Before, Now & Then**	**Kamila Andini**	**Fourcolours Films, Titimangsa Foundation**
**2022** (42nd)	Autobiography	Makbul Mubarak	KawanKawan Media, Kaninga Pictures
**2022** (42nd)	Stealing Raden Saleh	Angga Dwimas Sasongko	Visinema Pictures
**2022** (42nd)	Missing Home	Bene Dion Rajagukguk	Imajinari
**2022** (42nd)	Vengeance Is Mine, All Others Pay Cash	Edwin	Palari Films
**2023** (43rd)	**Women from Rote Island**	**Jeremias Nyangoen**	**Bintang Cahaya Sinema, Langit Terang Sinema**
**2023** (43rd)	Andragogy	Wregas Bhanuteja	Rekata Studio, Kaninga Pictures, Momo Film Co., KG Media, Masih Belajar, Hwallywood Studio
**2023** (43rd)	24 Hours with Gaspar	Yosep Anggi Noen	Kawan Kawan Media, Vi Sinema Pictures, Legacy Pictures
**2023** (43rd)	Like & Share	Gina S. Noer	Starvision, Wahana Kreator, Nusantara
**2023** (43rd)	Sleep Call	Fajar Nugros	IDN Pictures
**2024** (44th)	**Falling In Love Like In Movies**	**Yandy Laurens**	**Imajinari, Cerita Films**
**2024** (44th)	Borderless Fog	Edwin	Palari Films
**2024** (44th)	Crocodile Tears	Tumpal Tampubolon	Talamedia
**2024** (44th)	Grave Torture	Joko Anwar	Come and See Pictures
**2024** (44th)	Samsara	Garin Nugroho	Cineria Films, Garin Workshop, Lynx Films
**2025** (45th)	**On Your Lap**	**Reza Rahadian**	**Gambar Gerak**
**2025** (45th)	Jumbo	Ryan Adriandhy	Visinema Studios, Springboard, Anami Films
**2025** (45th)	The Siege at Thorn High	Joko Anwar	Come and See Pictures, Metro-Goldwyn-Mayer
**2025** (45th)	Sore: A Wife from the Future	Yandy Laurens	Cerita Films, Slingshot Pictures, Imajinari, Miles Films, Studio Artemis, Jagartha, Trinity Entertainment, Dwidaya Amadeo Gemintang
**2025** (45th)	This City Is a Battlefield	Mouly Surya	Cinesurya, Starvision Plus, Kaninga Pictures

== See also ==
- Cinema of Indonesia
- Indonesian Film Festival
- Citra Award for Best Director
- Citra Award for Best Actor
- Citra Award for Best Actress
- Citra Award for Best Supporting Actor
- Citra Award for Best Supporting Actress
- Maya Awards
