= 2023 Indonesian Film Festival =

2023 Indonesian film awards

43rd Indonesian Film Festival
- Awarded for: The achievement in Indonesian cinema
- Presented by: Indonesian Film Board; Ministry of Education, Culture, Research, and Technology
- Announced on: Nominations: 14 October 2023
- Presented on: 14 November 2023
- Site: Ciputra Artpreneur, Jakarta, Indonesia
- Official website: www.festivalfilm.id

Highlights
- Best Picture: Women from Rote Island
- Most awards: Women from Rote Island (4)
- Most nominations: Andragogy (17)

The 43rd Indonesian Film Festival ceremony, presented by Indonesian Film Board and Ministry of Education, Culture, Research, and Technology, honouring the achievement in Indonesian cinema released from 1 September 2022 to 31 August 2023, was held on 14 November 2023 at the Ciputra Artpreneur, Jakarta, Indonesia.

Drama film Women from Rote Island won the most awards with four, including Best Picture. Other winners included Like & Share with three, Andragogy, A Long Way to Come Home, and Sri Asih with two, 24 Hours with Gaspar, The Big 4, Deadly Love Poetry, Evacuation of Mama Enola, The Exiles, Innocent Vengeance, Trungtung and Wisisi Nit Meke with one.

== Overview ==
The theme of 2023 Indonesian Film Festival is Citra Cup itself. The name Citra, inspired by a poem of Usmar Ismail and associated with the award since 1967, is a symbol of the supremacy of Indonesian cinema.

Audience Choice Film Special Award Every year the Audience Choice special award is named after Indonesian film legends in appreciation of their contribution. This year it has been named after Lilik Sudjio, who is the director of the film Tarmina, a legendary film which was awarded Best Film and Best Director awards at the inaugural Indonesian Film Festival in 1955.

== Winners and nominees ==
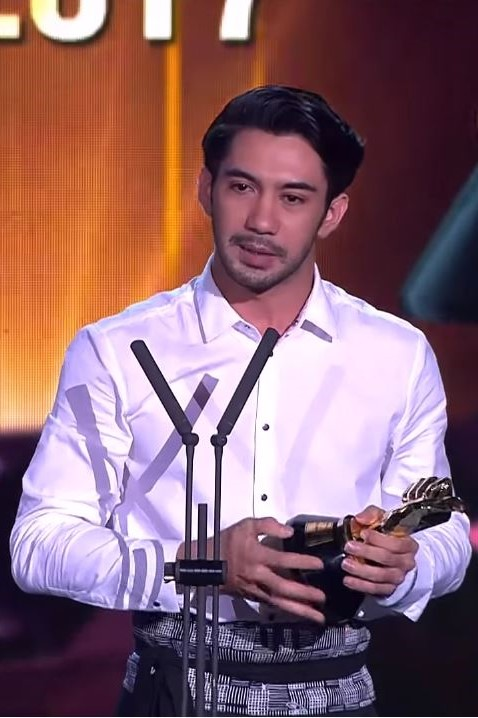
Reza Rahadian, Best Actor winner

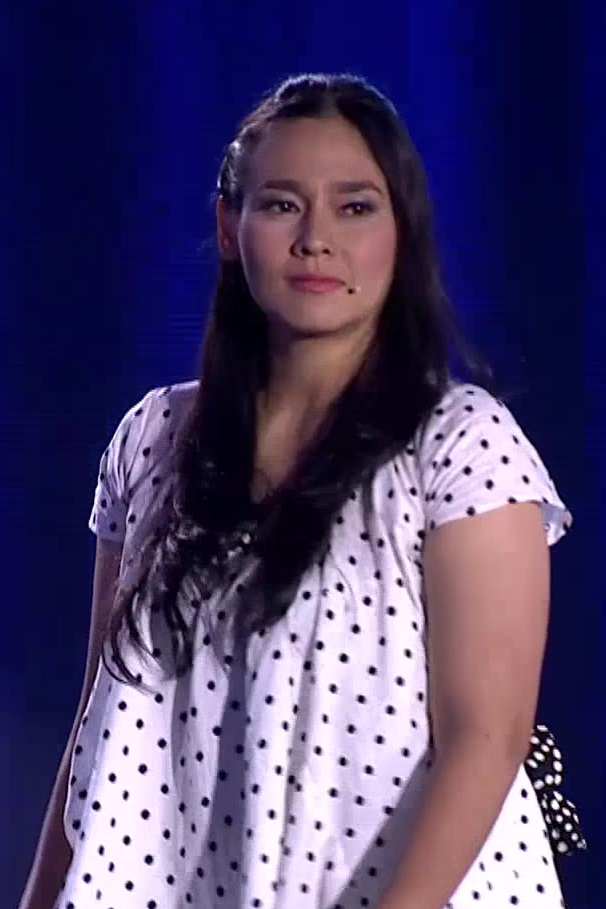
Sha Ine Febriyanti, Best Actress winner

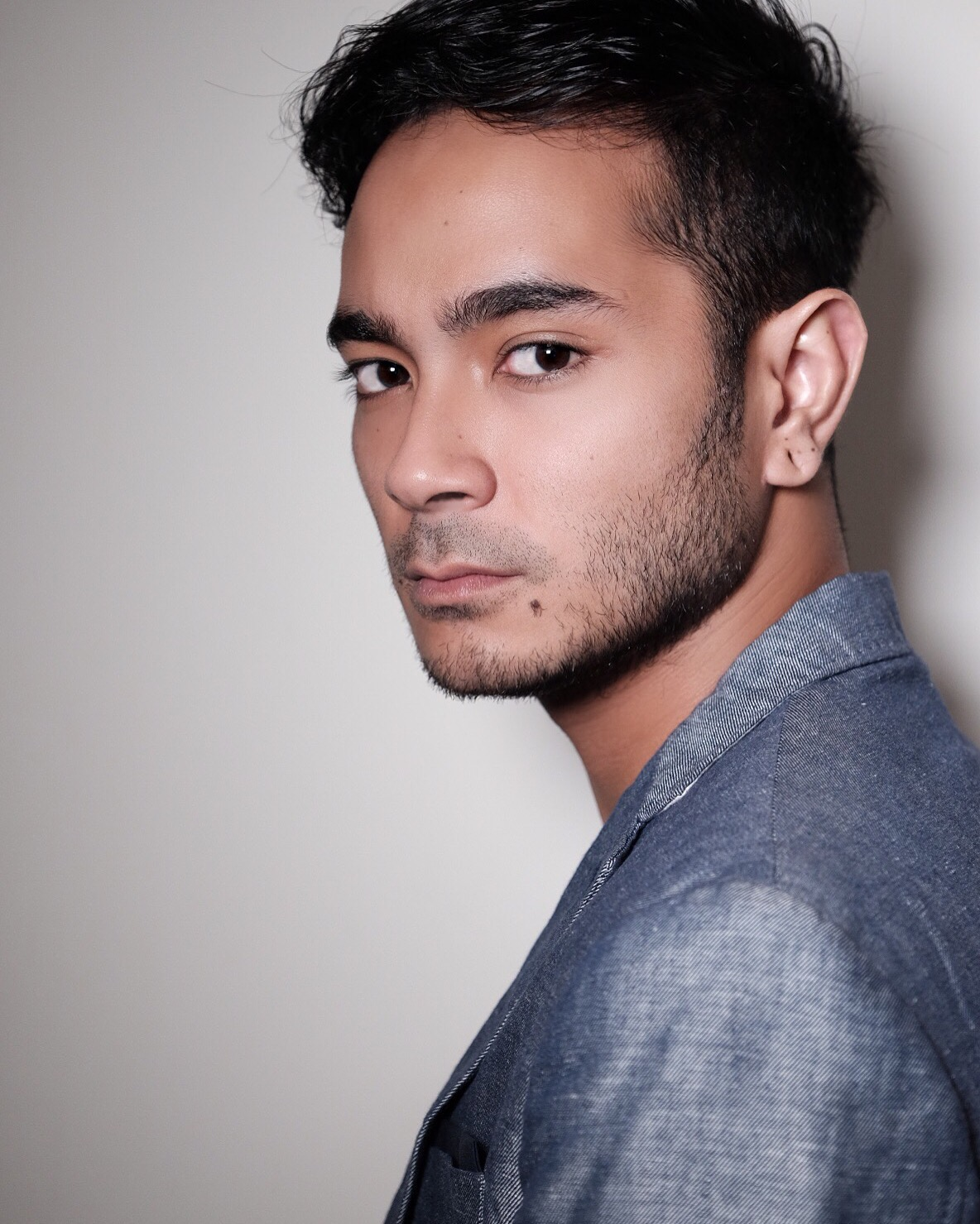
Marthino Lio, Best Supporting Actor winner

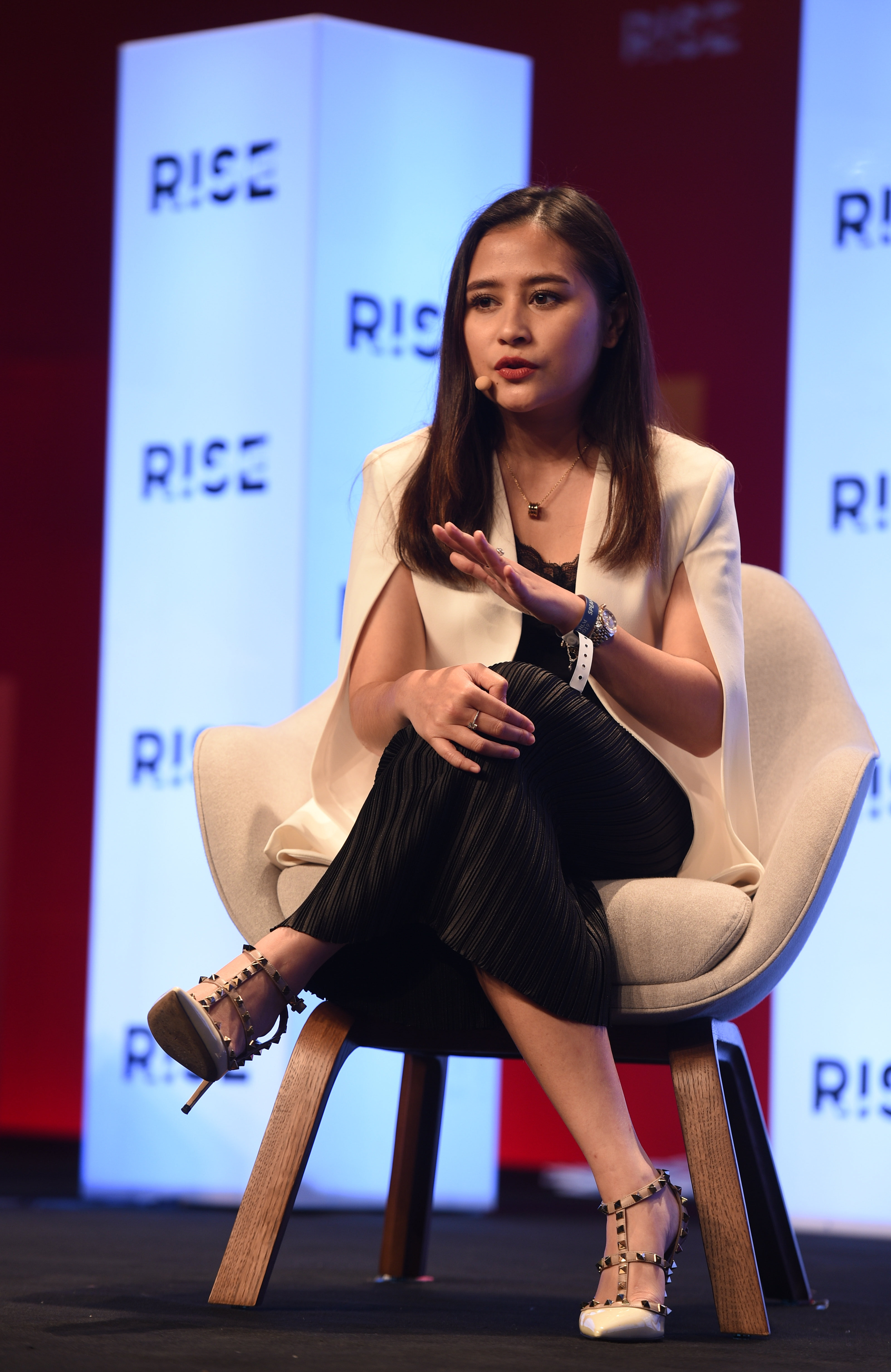
Prilly Latuconsina, Best Supporting Actress winner

The nominations for Citra Awards were announced at the National Museum of Indonesia on 14 October 2023 by Chicco Kurniawan, Putri Marino, Laura Basuki, Lukman Sardi, and Christine Hakim. Andragogy received 17 nominations, most for a film in the 43rd edition; Like & Share and The Big 4 tied for second with eleven nominations each. Asha Smara Darra became the first trans woman to be nominated for the Best Actress category.

Winners are listed first, highlighted in boldface, and indicated with a double dagger (‡).

**Best Picture**: **Women from Rote Island – Rizka Shakira**; 24 Hours with Gaspar – Cristian Imanuell and Yulia Evina Bhara; Andragogy – Adi Ekatama, Willawati, and Iman Usman; Like & Share – Chand Parwez Servia and Gina S. Noer; Sleep Call – Susanti Dewi	**Best Director**: **Jeremias Nyangoen – Women from Rote Island**; Gina S. Noer – Like & Share; Timo Tjahjanto – The Big 4; Wregas Bhanuteja – Andragogy; Yosep Anggi Noen – 24 Hours with Gaspar
**Best Actor**: **Reza Rahadian – Innocent Vengeance as Adam**; Abimana Aryasatya – The Big 4 as Topan; Angga Yunanda – Andragogy as Muklas; Jose Rizal Manua – The Prize as Da Am; Vino G. Bastian – Buya Hamka Vol. 1 as Abdul Malik Karim Amrullah / Hamka	**Best Actress**: **Sha Ine Febriyanti – Andragogy as Prani**; Asha Smara Darra – Sara as Sara; Aurora Ribero – Like & Share as Lisa; Jajang C. Noer – The Prize as Ni Ta; Laura Basuki – Sleep Call as Dina
**Best Supporting Actor**: **Marthino Lio – The Big 4 as Antonio Sandoval / Suranto**; Arnold Kobogau – Orpa as Septinus; Dwi Sasono – Andragogy as Didit; Omara Esteghlal – Andragogy as Gora; Yoga Pratama – Innocent Vengeance as Diaz	**Best Supporting Actress**: **Prilly Latuconsina – Andragogy as Tita**; Aulia Sarah – Like & Share as Fita; Christine Hakim – Sara as Muryem; Dewi Irawan – 24 Hours with Gaspar as Bu Tati; Lutesha – The Big 4 as Alpha
**Best Original Screenplay**: **Women from Rote Island – Jeremias Nyangoen**; Andragogy – Wregas Bhanuteja; The Big 4 – Timo Tjahjanto and Johanna Wattimena; Like & Share – Gina S. Noer; Tegar – Anggi Frisca and Alim Sudio	**Best Adapted Screenplay**: **24 Hours with Gaspar – M. Irfan Ramli; based on the novel by Sabda Armandio**; A Long Way to Come Home – M. Irfan Ramli and Angga Dwimas Sasongko; based on the novel Nanti Kita Cerita Tentang Hari Ini by Marchella FP; Buya Hamka Vol. 1 – Alim Sudio and Cassandra Massardi; based on the life of Hamka; Fireworks – Alim Sudio; based on the original motion picture screenplay 3ft Ball & Souls written by Yoshio Kato; Sri Asih – Upi Avianto and Joko Anwar; based on the character from the comic books by R. A. Kosasih
**Best Cinematography**: **Women from Rote Island – Joseph Christoforus Fofid**; Andragogy – Gunnar Nimpuno; The Big 4 – Batara Goempar; Buya Hamka Vol. 1 – Ipung Rachmat Syaiful; Like & Share – Deska Binarso	**Best Editing**: **Like & Share – Aline Jusria**; Andragogy – Ahmad Yuniardi; Check the Store Next Door 2 – Ryan Purwoko; Qodrat – Teguh Raharjo; Sleep Call – Wawan I. Wibowo
**Best Visual Effects**: **Sri Asih – Kalvin Irawan**; 24 Hours with Gaspar – Naradhipa; Andragogy – Stefanus Binawan Utama; The Big 4 – Matterbox Visualworks; Qodrat – Gaga Nugraha Ramadhan	**Best Sound**: **Like & Share – Aria Prayogi, M. Ichsan Rachmaditta, and Muhammad Akbar Patawari**; 24 Hours with Gaspar – Wahyu Tri Purnomo and L.H. Aim Adi Negara; Andragogy – Satrio Budiono and Sutrisno; Qodrat – Aria Prayogi, Ridho Fachri, and M. Ichsan Rachmaditta; Sri Asih – Mohamad Ikhsan and M. Ichsan Rachmaditta
**Best Original Score**: **A Long Way to Come Home – Abel Huray**; 24 Hours with Gaspar – Ricky Lionardi; Andragogy – Yennu Ariendra; The Big 4 – Aghi Narottama, Tony Merle, and Bemby Gusti; Sri Asih – Aghi Narottama, Tony Merle, and Bemby Gusti	**Best Theme Song**: **"Jalan Pulang" from A Long Way to Come Home – Yura Yunita, Donne Maula, and Marchella FP**; "Dan Hujan" from Andragogy – Gardika Gigih; "Rerata" from A Long Way to Come Home – Armand Maulana; "Sorai" from When It Stops Here – Nadin Amizah and Doly Harahap; "Welcome to My Paradise" from The Big 4 – Steven N. Kaligis
**Best Art Direction**: **Like & Share – Dita Gambiro**; Andragogy – Dita Gambiro; 24 Hours with Gaspar – Ahmad "Mbah" Zulkarnaen; The Big 4 – Antonius Boedy; Deadly Love Poetry – Vida Sylvia Theresia	**Best Costume Design**: **Deadly Love Poetry – Retno Ratih Damayanti**; 24 Hours with Gaspar – Hagai Pakan; Andragogy – Fadillah Putri Yunidar; Buya Hamka Vol. 1 – Samuel Wattimena; Like & Share – Dara Asvia
**Best Makeup**: **Sri Asih – Aktris Handradjasa**; Andragogy – Astrid Sambudiono; The Big 4 – Ernaka Puspita Dewi; Buya Hamka Vol. 1 – Jerry Oktavianus; Like & Share – Astrid Sambudiono	**Best Live Action Short Film**: **Evacuation of Mama Enola – Anggun Priambodo, Reno F. Junirman, and Edwin**; Bloody Rose – Elsy Grazia and Emilianus U. K. Patar; Chorus of the Wounded Birds – Amar Haikal and Aras Sintiya; Payung Dara – Reni Apriliana, Fanny Chotimah, and Hanna Humaira; Vania on Lima Street – Bayu Prihantoro Filemon, Ganesya, and Arya Sweta; Wongasu – Aco Tenriyagelly and Suryo Wiyogo; yusufputus1 Baru Saja Mengunggah Video – Adrian Pratama Putra W. and Elvina Kurniawan
**Best Documentary Feature**: **The Exiles – Lola Amaria**; Herstory - An Untold History – Rudy Soedjarwo and Rafael Anindya Krishna Siddharta; Mayday! May Day! Mayday! – Yonri Revolt and Rendy Rizal; One Big Sumba Family – Tonny Trimarsanto, Mandy Marahimin and John Badalu	**Best Documentary Short Film**: **Wisisi Nit Meke – Arief Budiman, Harun Rumbarar, Bonny Lanny, and Wok the Rock**; The Independence Day: Between Tears and Laughters – Marjito Iskandar Tri Gunawan; Ludruk Dahulu, Kini, dan Nanti – Reni Apriliana and Yanu Andi Prasetyo; Penantian Iwan – Dwiki Marta and Rohmatin Bonasir; Riwayatmu Kini – Fanny Chotimah and Agustian Tri Yuanto; Sang Punggawa Laut Sumbawa – Harsa Perdana, M. Farhan, and Agus Ramdan
**Best Animated Short Film**: **Trungtung – Bony Wirasmono, Ricky Manoppo, and Aditya Triantoro**; Bunian – Ermambang Bendung Wijaya, M. Suyanto, and Ende Sumbogo; Ficusia – Ahmad Saropi and Selly Artaty Zega; I Saw a Ghost and It Was Beautiful – Bobby Fernando, Kemal Hasan, Salima Hakim, and Yohanes Merci; Kancil: Mencari & Dicari – Mikail Muhammad Lukman and Aji Dikdik Setiawan; Rotto and Kit – Adi Dharma Wirayudha	**Best Film Critic** **(Tanete Pong Masak Award)**: **Permata Adinda for Cinema Poetica – "Like & Share: Yang Tidak Tertangkap Layar dari Rekaman KBGO"**; Erina Adeline Tandian and Yohanes Yoga Prayuda for Tandian's YouTube channel – "Limbotopia Urban: Membongkar Pola Naratif Time Loop Film Sabar Ini Ujian"; Moch. Taufik Hidayatullah for his blog – "Mengelamkan Pesantren Secara Sinematik dalam Qorin: Percaturan Politik Gender dan Pesantren"; Ni Luh Ayu Sukmawati for her blog – "Menjadi Laki-Laki dalam Bingkai Patriarki: Membongkar Demistifikasi Hegemoni dalam Autobiography (2022)"; Sunlie Thomas Alexander for Langgar – "Dari Kisah Traumatis Anak Yatim sampai Reproduksi Mitos Pribumi Malas: Catatan atas Film Gundala (2019) dan Sri Asih (2022)"
**Lifetime Achievement Awards**: **H. M. Soleh Ruslani**‡; **Raam Punjabi**‡

=== Audience awards ===
**Lilik Sudjio Award for Favorite Film**: **When It Stops Here – Yahni Damayanti, Prilly Latuconsina, Lisbeth Simarmata, and Umay Shahab**‡
**A. N. Alcaff Award for Favorite Actor**: **Refal Hady – When It Stops Here as Ifan**	**Dhalia Award for Favorite Actress**: **Rachel Vennya – Sleep Call as Nur**

=== Films with multiple nominations and awards ===
Films that received multiple nominations
Nominations	Film
17	Andragogy
11	Like & Share
11	The Big 4
9	24 Hours with Gaspar
5	Buya Hamka Vol. 1
5	Sri Asih
4	Women from Rote Island
4	A Long Way to Come Home
3	Sleep Call
3	Qodrat
2	Innocent Vengeance
2	The Prize
2	Deadly Love Poetry
2	Sara

Films with multiple wins
Wins	Film
4	Women from Rote Island
3	Like & Share
2	Andragogy
2	A Long Way to Come Home
2	Sri Asih

== Presenters and performers ==
The following individuals presented awards or performed musical numbers.

Presenters
Name(s)	Role
Emir Mahira	Presented the awards for Best Animated Short Film and Best Live Action Short Film
Chitra Subyakto	Presented the awards for Best Costume Design and Best Makeup
Chicco Jerikho	Presented the award for Best Supporting Actress
Marissa Anita	Presented the award for Best Supporting Actor
Ifa Isfansyah	Presented the awards for Best Visual Effects and Best Editing
Chicco Kurniawan	Introduced the performance of Rossa
Melly Goeslaw	Presented the award for Best Theme Song
Titi Radjo Padmaja	Presented the awards for Best Original Score and Best Sound
Cut Mini	Presented the awards for Best Art Direction and Best Cinematography
Christine Hakim	Presented the "In Memoriam" segment
Reza Rahadian	Presented the Lifetime Achievement Awards
Tissa Biani; Adipati Dolken	Presented the Audience Awards and Best Film Critic
Salman Aristo	Presented the awards for Best Original Screenplay and Best Adapted Screenplay
Laura Basuki	Introduced the performance of Iwan Fals
Gita Fara	Presented the awards for Best Documentary Short Film and Best Documentary Feature
Dian Sastrowardoyo	Presented the award for Best Actor
Slamet Rahardjo Djarot	Presented the award for Best Actress
Joko Anwar	Presented the award for Best Director
Agni Ariatama; Andhy Pulung; Ekky Imanjaya; Raihaanun; Sekar Ayu Asmara; Shanty Harmayn	Presented the award for Best Picture

Performers
Name(s)	Role	Work
Andi Rianto	Music director	
Rossa	Performer	Medley: "Jangan Hilangkan Dia", "Karena Cinta Yang Menemani", "Ayat-Ayat Cinta"
Rio Sidik	Performer	
Iwan Fals	Performer	"Ijinkan Aku Menyayangimu"
Indonesian Children and Youth Choir Cordana	Choir	"Citra"
