= Innocent Vengeance =

2023 thriller film

- Release poster
- Directed by: Teddy Soeriaatmadja
- Written by: Teddy Soeriaatmadja; Rayya Makarim
- Produced by: Teddy Soeriaatmadja; Baim Wong
- Starring: Reza Rahadian; Laura Basuki; Baim Wong; Yoga Pratama; Kiki Narendra
- Cinematography: Vera Lestafa
- Edited by: Yoga Krispratama
- Music by: Ricky Lionardi; Andi Prasetio
- Production companies: Tiger Wong Entertainment; Karuna Pictures
- Distributed by: Amazon Prime Video
- Release date: 16 February 2023
- Running time: 109 minutes
- Country: Indonesia
- Language: Indonesian

Innocent Vengeance (Indonesian: Berbalas Kejam) is a 2023 thriller film written and directed by Teddy Soeriaatmadja. It stars Reza Rahadian as Adam, an architect who plans to seek revenge for the murder of his family, alongside Laura Basuki, Baim Wong, Yoga Pratama, and Kiki Narendra.

The film was released on Amazon Prime Video on 16 February 2023. It received two nominations at the 2023 Indonesian Film Festival: Best Actor for Rahadian and Best Supporting Actor for Pratama.

== Premise ==
Adam, an architect who has to deal with trauma after the murder of his wife and son, plans to seek revenge for the killers.

== Cast ==
- Reza Rahadian as Adam Gunawan
- Laura Basuki as Amanda
- Baim Wong as Karni
- Yoga Pratama as Diaz
- Kiki Narendra as Gyat Santoso

== Production ==
The film marks Baim Wong's producing debut under his production company Tiger Wong Entertainment. Wong himself had cast Rahadian and Basuki to play the lead roles.

== Release ==
Innocent Vengeance was released on 16 February 2023 on Amazon Prime Video.

The release date was revealed along with its first look on 25 January 2023. The trailer was released on 7 February 2023.

== Accolades ==
Award / Film Festival	Date of ceremony	Category	Recipient(s)	Result	Ref.
Indonesian Film Festival	14 November 2023	Best Actor	Reza Rahadian	Won	
Indonesian Film Festival	14 November 2023	Best Supporting Actor	Yoga Pratama	Nominated	
Film Pilihan Tempo	29 January 2024	Best Actor	Reza Rahadian	Nominated	
