= Visinema Pictures =

Indonesian film production company

- Production logo
- Industry: Film industry
- Founded: 2008; 18 years ago
- Founder: Angga Dwimas Sasongko; Anggia Kharisma
- Headquarters: Jakarta, Indonesia
- Website: Official website

Visinema Pictures is an Indonesian film production company founded in 2008 by filmmakers Angga Dwimas Sasongko and Anggia Kharisma. The company started by producing various commercial and music videos.

Its first film, Hari Untuk Amanda, was released on 7 January 2010. The film was nominated for the Citra Award for Best Picture. The company is best known for producing Citra Award-winning and nominated films, including Lights from the East: I Am Maluku (2014), Letters from Prague (2016), Cemara's Family (2018), and Stealing Raden Saleh (2022).

In February 2020, Visinema announced that it has secured Series A funding of US$3.25 million, equivalent to Rp45.5 billion. The round was led by Indonesian venture capital firm Intudo Ventures.

== Films ==
=== Feature films ===
==== 2010s ====
Release date	Title	Director	Co-production companie(s)	Notes
7 January 2010	Hari Untuk Amanda	Angga Dwimas Sasongko	MNC Pictures	Nominated—Citra Award for Best Picture
19 June 2014	Lights from the East: I Am Maluku	Angga Dwimas Sasongko	—N/a	Citra Award for Best Picture
9 April 2015	Filosofi Kopi	Angga Dwimas Sasongko	—N/a	
28 January 2016	Letters from Prague	Angga Dwimas Sasongko	Tinggikan Production; 13 Entertainment	Nominated—Citra Award for Best Picture; Official Indonesian submission for the Best Foreign Language Film at the 89th Academy Awards
13 October 2016	Wonderful Life	Agus Makkie	Creative & Co.	
23 February 2017	Bukaan 8	Angga Dwimas Sasongko	Chanex Ridhall Pictures; Kaninga Pictures	
13 July 2017	Filosofi Kopi the Movie 2: Ben & Jody	Angga Dwimas Sasongko	13 Entertainment	
15 March 2018	Love for Sale	Andibachtiar Yusuf	13 Entertainment; Stay Connected Media	
29 November 2018	Cemara's Family	Yandy Laurens	Ideosource Entertainment; Kaskus	Nominated—Citra Award for Best Picture
31 January 2019	Too Handsome to Handle	Sabrina Rochelle Kalangie	Kaskus	
4 April 2019	The Wedding Shaman	Farishad Latjuba	Kaskus, JD.ID	
1 August 2019	Bridezilla	Andibachtiar Yusuf	Tony Mulani Films	
31 October 2019	Love for Sale 2	Andibachtiar Yusuf	Tony Mulani Films	
5 December 2019	Eggnoid: Love & Time Portal	Naya Anindita	Dynamic Pictures; Spacetoon Films	

==== 2020s ====
Release date	Title	Director	Co-production companie(s)	Notes
2 January 2020	One Day We'll Talk About Today	Angga Dwimas Sasongko	IDN Media; Blibli; XRM Media	
23 October 2020	Story of Kale: When Someone's in Love	Angga Dwimas Sasongko	—N/a	Bioskop Online original film
24 December 2020	Generasi 90an: Melankolia	M. Irfan Ramly	Tony Mulani Films	
22 April 2021	Plastic Island	Dandhy Laksono; Rahung Nasution	Kopernik; Akarumput; Watchdoc	
13 May 2021	Heartbeat	Yongki Ongestu	Aenigma Pictures	
8 July 2021	Nussa	Bony Wirasmono	The Little Giantz	
29 October 2021	Story of Dinda: Second Chance of Happiness	Ginanti Rona	—N/a	Bioskop Online original film
30 September 2021	Aum!	Bambang "Ipoenk" Kuntara Mukti	Layar Tanjap Films; X-Code Films	Bioskop Online original film
27 January 2022	Ben & Jody	Angga Dwimas Sasongko	Astro Shaw; Jagartha; Blibli	
4 February 2022	Arini by Love.inc	Adrianto Sinaga	—N/a	Bioskop Online original film
9 June 2022	Cemara's Family 2	Ismail Basbeth	Astro Shaw; Jagartha; Blibli	
25 August 2022	Stealing Raden Saleh	Angga Dwimas Sasongko	Astro Shaw; Jagartha; Blibli	Nominated—Citra Award for Best Picture
29 September 2022	Spirited	Ruben Adrian	Astro Shaw; Jagartha; Blibli; Infinite Studios	
22 December 2022	Tumbal Kanjeng Iblis	Mizam Fadilah Ananda	Legacy Pictures	
2 February 2023	A Long Way to Come Home	Angga Dwimas Sasongko	Legacy Pictures; XRM Media	
22 June 2023	The Prize	Paul Agusta	Visionari Capital; Gandrvng Films	
27 July 2023	Today We'll Talk About That Day	Angga Dwimas Sasongko	—N/a	Netflix original film
31 August 2023	Susuk	Ginanti Rona	Legacy Pictures; Visionari Capital; Goodwork	
6 October 2023	24 Hours with Gaspar	Yosep Anggi Noen	Legacy Pictures; KawanKawan Media	Netflix original film
7 October 2023	Ali Topan	Sidharta Tata	Legacy Pictures; Kebon Studio	
28 December 2023	13 Bombs in Jakarta	Angga Dwimas Sasongko	Legacy Pictures; Barunson E&A; Indodax; Volix Pictures; Folkative; INFIA	
1 August 2024	Heartbreak Motel	Angga Dwimas Sasongko	—N/a	
26 September 2024	Home Sweet Loan	Sabrina Rochelle Kalangie	Legacy Pictures	
14 November 2024	Wanita Ahli Neraka	Farishad Latjuba	Legacy Pictures	
12 December 2024	Blood Debt	Billy Christian	Legacy Pictures; EST N8	
31 March 2025	Jumbo	Ryan Adriandhy	Springboard Entertainment; Anami Films	
7 August 2025	Call Me Dad	Benni Setiawan	CJ ENM; Legacy Pictures; Anami Films; CBI Pictures; Indopictures Studio	Based on the 2020 film Pawn
18 March 2026	Na Willa	Ryan Adriandhy	—N/a	Based on the novel Na Willa by Reda Gaudiamo

=== Short films ===
Release date	Title	Director	Co-production companie(s)	Notes
25 March 2022	Melodialog	Adriano Rudiman	—N/a	

=== Television series ===
Year	Title	Network
2018	Filosofi Kopi the Series	GoPlay
2018	Kostan AX/3	Kaskus TV
2019	Nanti Kita Cerita Tentang Hari Ini	YouTube
2020	Melankolia	YouTube
2021	Awal & Akhir	Bioskop Online
2022	Pretty Little Liars (season 2)	Viu
2022	Keluarga Cemara the Series	Disney+ Hotstar
