= One Day We'll Talk About Today =

2020 film directed by Angga Dwimas Sasongko

- Film poster
- Nanti Kita Cerita tentang Hari Ini
- Directed by: Angga Dwimas Sasongko
- Written by: Jenny Jusuf; Angga Dwimas Sasongko; Melarissa Sjarief
- Based on: Nanti Kita Cerita tentang Hari Ini by Marcella FP
- Produced by: Anggia Kharisma
- Starring: Rachel Amanda; Rio Dewanto; Sheila Dara Aisha; Donny Damara; Susan Bachtiar; Ardhito Pramono; Oka Antara; Niken Anjani; Agla Artalidia
- Cinematography: Yadi Sugandi
- Edited by: Hendra Adhi Susanto
- Music by: Ofel Obaja
- Production companies: Visinema Pictures; IDN Media; Blibli.com; XRM Media
- Distributed by: Visinema Pictures (International); Astro Shaw (Malaysia)
- Release date: January 2, 2020
- Running time: 121 minutes
- Country: Indonesia
- Language: Indonesian
- Box office: $6 million

One Day We'll Talk About Today (Indonesian: Nanti Kita Cerita tentang Hari Ini) is a 2020 Indonesian family drama film directed by Angga Dwimas Sasongko and produced by Visinema Pictures. The film was adapted from the novel Nanti Kita Cerita tentang Hari Ini by Marcella FP. The film stars Rachel Amanda, Rio Dewanto, Sheila Dara Aisha, Ardhito Pramono, Donny Damara, Susan Bachtiar, Oka Antara, Niken Anjani, and Agla Artalidia. This film released on January 2, 2020.

The sequel, A Long Way to Come Home was released on February 2, 2023.

== Plot ==
Angkasa (Rio Dewanto), Aurora (Sheila Dara Aisha), and Awan (Rachel Amanda) are siblings who live in a happy-looking family. After experiencing her first major failure, Awan meets Kale (Ardhito Pramono), an eccentric boy who gave Awan a new life experience, about breaking, rising, falling, growing, being, and all the fears of people in general. The change in Awan's attitude leads to pressure from her parents. This prompts the rebellion of the three siblings, which leads to the discovery of bigger secrets and trauma in their family.

== Cast ==
- Rachel Amanda as Awan
  - Gween Nastusha Ellvania as baby Awan
  - Alleyra Fakhira as 6-year-old Awan
- Rio Dewanto as Angkasa
  - Muhammad Adhiyat as 6-year-old Angkasa
  - Sinyo Riza as 12-year-old Angkasa
- Sheila Dara Aisha as Aurora
  - Nayla D. Purnama as 9-year-old Aurora
  - Syaqila Afiffah Putri as 3-year-old Aurora
- Donny Damara as Narendra
  - Oka Antara as Young Narendra
- Susan Bachtiar as Ajeng
  - Niken Anjani as Young Ajeng
- Ardhito Pramono as Kale
- Agla Artalidia as Lika
- Umay Shahab as Uya
- Sivia Azizah as Revina
- Chicco Jerikho as Anton
- Joe Project P as a Member of Anton
- Isyana Sarasvati as Awan's daughter
- Arswendi Nasution as a Doctor
- Dayu Wijanto as a Sister
- Gary Iskak as Gary

== Production ==
On February 11, 2019, Visinema announced that he would convert the novel Nanti Kita Cerita tentang Hari Ini into a film of the same name. Angga Dwimas Sasongko was announced to be the director of this film. Jenny Jusuf which involved in writing this screenplay is a figure behind a number of films that are quite successful such as Filosofi Kopi and Critical Eleven. IDN Media, Blibli.com, and XRM Media were involved in the production of this film as executive producers. Cast of the film was announced on August 7, 2019.

== Release and reception ==
On July 14, 2019, the film is planned to be aired in January 2020. In November, the exact date of the screening of the film was announced on January 9, 2020, which was then advanced to January 2, 2020, a few weeks later.

Arnidhya Nur Zhafira of "Antara" praised the very strong characterization of all the main actors, causing closeness to the audience. Rieska Utami who wrote for "Cultura" praised the director, screenwriter, actor and actress for performing a role so well that the verses of poetry in the novel can be conveyed flexibly.

One Day We'll Talk About Today made its linear television premiere on Trans7 on December 25, 2020.

== Awards and nominations ==
Award	Date of ceremony	Category	Recipient(s)	Result	Ref.
Bandung Film Festival	14 November 2020	Best Actor in a Supporting Role	Donny Damara	Nominated	
Indonesian Film Festival	5 December 2020	Best Theme Songwriter	Ardhito Pramono (Fine Today)	Won	
Indonesian Film Festival	5 December 2020	Best Original Score	Ofel Obaja	Nominated	
Indonesian Movie Actors Awards	25 July 2020	Best Actor	Rio Dewanto	Nominated	
Indonesian Movie Actors Awards	25 July 2020	Favorite Actor	Rio Dewanto	Nominated	
Indonesian Movie Actors Awards	25 July 2020	Best Supporting Actor	Oka Antara	Won	
Indonesian Movie Actors Awards	25 July 2020	Favorite Supporting Actor	Oka Antara	Nominated	
Indonesian Movie Actors Awards	25 July 2020	Best Newcomer	Ardhito Pramono	Nominated	
Indonesian Movie Actors Awards	25 July 2020	Favorite Newcomer	Ardhito Pramono	Won	
Indonesian Movie Actors Awards	25 July 2020	Best Child Role	Sinyo Riza	Nominated	
Indonesian Movie Actors Awards	25 July 2020	Best Ensemble	One Day We'll Talk About Today	Nominated	
Indonesian Movie Actors Awards	25 July 2020	Favorite Film	One Day We'll Talk About Today	Nominated	
Indonesian Music Awards	26 November 2020	Best Production Work	Ardhito Pramono (Fine Today)	Nominated	
Indonesian Music Awards	26 November 2020	Best Jazz Contemporary Artist	Ardhito Pramono (Fine Today)	Won	
Indonesian Music Awards	26 November 2020	Best Original Soundtrack Production Work	Ardhito Pramono (Fine Today)	Nominated	
Indonesian Music Awards	26 November 2020	Best Record Producer	Ardhito Pramono (Fine Today)	Nominated	
Indonesian Music Awards	26 November 2020	Best Sound Production Team	Aldi Nada Permana & Ardhito Pramono (Fine Today)	Nominated	
Indonesian Music Awards	26 November 2020	Best Pop Female Solo Artist	Isyana Sarasvati (Untuk Hati yang Terluka)	Nominated	
Indonesian Music Awards	26 November 2020	Best Pop Songwriting	Isyana Sarasvati (Untuk Hati yang Terluka)	Nominated	
Maya Awards	8 February 2020	Best Feature Film	One Day We'll Talk About Today	Nominated	
Maya Awards	8 February 2020	Best Director	Angga Dwimas Sasongko	Nominated	
Maya Awards	8 February 2020	Best Adapted Screenplay	Jenny Jusuf, Angga Dwimas Sasongko & Melarissa Sjarief	Nominated	
Maya Awards	8 February 2020	Best Actor in a Leading Role	Rio Dewanto	Nominated	
Maya Awards	8 February 2020	Best Actor in a Supporting Role	Donny Damara	Nominated	
Maya Awards	8 February 2020	Best Actress in a Supporting Role	Sheila Dara Aisha	Nominated	
Maya Awards	8 February 2020	Best New Actor	Ardhito Pramono	Nominated	
Maya Awards	8 February 2020	Best Cinematography	Yadi Sugandi	Won	
Maya Awards	8 February 2020	Best Editing	Hendra Adhi Susanto	Nominated	
Maya Awards	8 February 2020	Best Poster Design	Nady Azhry	Nominated	
Maya Awards	8 February 2020	Best Theme Song	Hindia (Secukupnya)	Nominated	
Maya Awards	8 February 2020	Best Theme Song	Isyana Sarasvati (Untuk Hati yang Terluka)	Nominated	

== Soundtrack ==
- Isyana Sarasvati – Untuk Hati yang Terluka. (For the Broken Hearted.)
- Hindia – Secukupnya (Just Enough)
- Ardhito Pramono – Bitter Love, Fine Today
- Kunto Aji – Rehat (Take a Rest)
- ARAH – I Want to Rock n' Roll, Awal & Akhir (The Beginning and the End)
- Chiki Fawzi – Belukar Dunia (World Grove)
- Sisir Tanah – Lagu Pejalan (The Walker's Song)
