= Sleep Call =

2023 thriller film

- Theatrical release poster
- Directed by: Fajar Nugros
- Written by: Fajar Nugros; Husein M. Atmodjo
- Produced by: Susanti Dewi
- Starring: Laura Basuki; Juan Bio One
- Cinematography: Wendy Aga
- Edited by: Wawan I. Wibowo
- Music by: Fajar Yuskemal
- Production company: IDN Pictures
- Release date: 7 September 2023 (Indonesia)
- Running time: 100 minutes
- Country: Indonesia
- Language: Indonesian

Sleep Call is a 2023 psychological thriller film directed and co-written by Fajar Nugros. The film stars Laura Basuki and Juan Bio One.

It was nominated for three Citra Awards at the Indonesian Film Festival, including Best Picture and Best Actress for Basuki.

== Premise ==
Dina seeks companion from Rama, a charming stranger she meet from a dating platform, as she is trapped in debt and coerced to work at an illegal loan company.

== Cast ==
- Laura Basuki as Dina
- Juan Bio One as Rama
- Della Dartyan as Bella
- Kristo Immanuel as Bayu
- Bront Palarae as Tommy
- Jenny Zhang as Dina's mother
- Niken Anjani as Maya
- Rukman Rosadi as Iwan
- Morgan Oey as Artist

== Release ==
Sleep Call was released theatrically in Indonesia on 7 September 2023. It garnered 335,786 admissions during its theatrical run.

== Accolades ==
Award / Film festival	Date of ceremony	Category	Recipient(s)	Result	Ref.
Indonesian Film Festival	14 November 2023	Best Picture	Susanti Dewi	Nominated	
Indonesian Film Festival	14 November 2023	Best Actress	Laura Basuki	Nominated	
Indonesian Film Festival	14 November 2023	Best Film Editing	Wawan I. Wibowo	Nominated	
Film Pilihan Tempo	29 January 2024	Best Actress	Laura Basuki	Nominated	
