= Women from Rote Island =

2023 drama film

- Theatrical release poster
- Indonesian: Perempuan Berkelamin Darah
- Directed by: Jeremias Nyangoen
- Written by: Jeremias Nyangoen
- Produced by: Rizka Shakira
- Starring: Linda Adoe; Irma Rihi; Sallum Ratu Ke; Van Jhoov
- Cinematography: Joseph Christoforus Fofid
- Edited by: Beck
- Music by: Leodet
- Production companies: Bintang Cahaya Sinema; Langit Terang Sinema
- Release date: 7 October 2023 (Busan)
- Running time: 106 minutes
- Country: Indonesia
- Language: Rote

Women from Rote Island is a 2023 Indonesian drama film written and directed by Jeremias Nyangoen in his feature directorial debut.

The film had its world premiere at the 28th Busan International Film Festival on 7 October 2023. It received four awards at the 2023 Indonesian Film Festival, including Best Picture and Best Director for Nyangoen. It was selected as the Indonesian submission for the Best International Feature Film at the 97th Academy Awards, but was not nominated.

== Premise ==
Martha, an illegal migrant worker, comes back to her hometown in Rote Island to attend her father's funeral. Meanwhile, she has to deal with her own trauma after experiencing sexual violence in her workplace.

== Cast ==
- Linda Adoe as Orpa
- Irma Rihi as Martha
- Sallum Ratu Ke as Bertha
- Van Jhoov as Damar

== Production ==
=== Casting ===
Nyangoen revealed that he only cast local actors of Rote Island and around East Nusa Tenggara in order to preserve the distinctive accent of the Rote language and capture the essence of the region.

== Release ==
Women from Rote Island had its world premiere at the 28th Busan International Film Festival on 7 October 2023 as a part of the A Window on Asian Cinema program. It also is set to screen at the 2023 Jakarta Film Week.

== Accolades ==
Award / Film Festival	Date of ceremony	Category	Recipient(s)	Result	Ref.
Asian Film Festival Barcelona	25 October - 5 November 2023	NETPAC Award	Women from Rote Island	Special Mention	
Jakarta Film Week	29 October 2023	Direction Award	Women from Rote Island	Won	
Indonesian Film Festival	14 November 2023	Best Picture	Rizka Shakira	Won	
Indonesian Film Festival	14 November 2023	Best Director	Jeremias Nyangoen	Won	
Indonesian Film Festival	14 November 2023	Best Original Screenplay	Jeremias Nyangoen	Won	
Indonesian Film Festival	14 November 2023	Best Cinematography	Joseph Christoforus Fofid	Won	
Jogja-NETPAC Asian Film Festival	2 December 2023	JAFF Indonesian Screen Award – Best Performance	Irma Rihi	Won	
Jogja-NETPAC Asian Film Festival	2 December 2023	JAFF Indonesian Screen Award – Best Cinematography	Joseph Christoforus Fofid	Won	
Film Pilihan Tempo	29 January 2024	Film Pilihan Tempo	Women from Rote Island	Won	
Film Pilihan Tempo	29 January 2024	Best Director	Jeremias Nyangoen	Won	
Film Pilihan Tempo	29 January 2024	Best Screenplay	Jeremias Nyangoen	Nominated	
Film Pilihan Tempo	29 January 2024	Best Actress	Linda Adoe	Won	
Film Pilihan Tempo	29 January 2024	Best Supporting Actress	Irma Rihi	Nominated	

== See also ==
- List of submissions to the 97th Academy Awards for Best International Feature Film
- List of Indonesian submissions for the Academy Award for Best International Feature Film
