= The Prize (2023 film) =

2023 drama film

- Theatrical release poster
- Directed by: Paul Fauzan Agusta
- Written by: Paul Fauzan Agusta
- Produced by: Suryo Wiyogo; Cristian Imanuell
- Starring: Shenina Cinnamon; Emir Mahira; Jajang C. Noer; Jose Rizal Manua; Shahabi Sakri; Ajil Ditto
- Cinematography: Mandella Majid
- Edited by: Reynaldi Christanto
- Production companies: Visinema Pictures; Gandeng Canang Film; Visionari Capital
- Release date: 22 June 2023 (Indonesia)
- Running time: 97 minutes
- Country: Indonesia
- Languages: Minangkabau; Indonesian

The Prize (Minangkabau: Onde Mande!; lit. Oh My Goodness!) is a 2023 Indonesian comedy-drama film directed and written by Paul Fauzan Agusta. It stars Shenina Cinnamon, Emir Mahira, Jajang C. Noer, Jose Rizal Manua, Shahabi Sakri, and Ajil Ditto.

The film was theatrically released on 22 June 2023. It received two nominations at the 2023 Indonesian Film Festival: Best Actor for Manua and Best Actress for Noer.

== Premise ==
The inhabitants of Sigiran Village, situated on the banks of Lake Maninjau, employ creative strategies to still obtain the lottery prize from the soap company to advance their village, although the initial winner has passed away.

== Cast ==
- Shenina Cinnamon as Si Mar
- Emir Mahira as Anwar
- Jajang C. Noer as Ni Ta
- Jose Rizal Manua as Da Am
- Shahabi Sakri as Huda
- Ajil Ditto as Hadi

== Production ==
Principal photography took place from January to February 2023 around the Lake Maninjau in West Sumatra.

== Release ==
The Prize was theatrically released on 22 June 2023. The film exceeded more than 100,000 admissions twelve days after its theatrical release.

The project was showcased during the Far East in Progress program at the 2023 Far East Film Festival.

== Accolades ==
Award / Film Festival	Date of ceremony	Category	Recipient(s)	Result	Ref.
Indonesian Film Festival	14 November 2023	Best Actor	Jose Rizal Manua	Nominated	
Indonesian Film Festival	14 November 2023	Best Actress	Jajang C. Noer	Nominated	
Film Pilihan Tempo	29 January 2024	Best Actor	Jose Rizal Manua	Nominated	
