= Czech Symphony Orchestra (disambiguation) =

Czech Symphony Orchestra may refer to:

- the Prague-based project orchestra CSO, view: Czech Symphony Orchestra (1994)
- the Janáček Philharmonic Orchestra used this name for their US-Tour in 2009
- former name of City of Prague Philharmonic Orchestra
- the Film Symphony Orchestra used this name for their international live performances in the 1990s
