= Andragogy (film) =

2023 drama film

- Official poster
- Indonesian: Budi Pekerti
- Directed by: Wregas Bhanuteja
- Written by: Wregas Bhanuteja
- Produced by: Adi Ekatama; Willawati; Ridla An-Nuur; Nurita Anandia
- Starring: Sha Ine Febriyanti; Angga Yunanda; Prilly Latuconsina; Dwi Sasono; Omara Esteghlal; Ari Lesmana
- Cinematography: Gunnar Nimpuno
- Edited by: Ahmad Yuniardi
- Music by: Yennu Ariendra
- Production companies: Rekata Studio; Kaninga Pictures; Momo Film Co.; KG Media; Masih Belajar; Hwallywood Studio; Tan Zheng Jie
- Release dates: 9 September 2023 (TIFF); 2 November 2023 (Indonesia)
- Running time: 110 minutes
- Countries: Indonesia; Singapore
- Languages: Indonesian; Javanese

Andragogy (Indonesian: Budi Pekerti, lit. 'Moral Character') is a 2023 drama film written and directed by Wregas Bhanuteja. The film stars Sha Ine Febriyanti as a school teacher whose reputation and career prospects get jeopardized after a video of her altercation with a line-cutter goes viral.

Andragogy had its world premiere at the 2023 Toronto International Film Festival on 9 September 2023. The film garnered seventeen nominations at the 2023 Indonesian Film Festival, including Best Picture, and it won two awards for Best Actress (Febriyanti) and Best Supporting Actress (Latuconsina).

== Plot ==
Prani Siswoyo is a teacher and principal candidate in Pengemban Utama Secondary School, Yogyakarta, revered for her engaging way of disciplining students. She lives with Didit Wibowo, her husband diagnosed with major depressive disorder due to effects of the COVID-19 pandemic; Tita, her daughter who works at a thrift shop and does social activism; and Muklas, her social media influencer son earning money from brand endorsements.

One day, while queueing at a market, Prani confronts a man who forces a queuer to help him cut the line. The man's denial enrages her, leading to a bystander recording her saying "Ah suwi", meaning "Too long" in Javanese. The video goes viral as many mistook her as saying "Asu", a Javanese slur meaning "Dog." The school directorate, while acknowledging the misperception, is concerned about Prani's seeming anger issue and schedules a psychotest. She then posts a clarification video, despite the school director urging her to only clarify to those who ask her.

When asked regarding Prani, Muklas claims she is not her mother, causing netizens to condemn him. The market man later posts a video slamming Prani for revealing his identity online. The school director warns to not do anything that can jeopardize the school's reputation. Upon Muklas' suggestion, Prani's former students post videos testifying to her disciplining as crucial to their maturation. However, a video by Gora recalling Prani telling him to dig graves sparked a wave of condemnations by psychiatrists.

Didit reaches out to his psychiatrist Tunggul, who also happens to be Gora's psychiatrist. She delays Gora's appointment so that he and Prani can meet and talk. He brushes off the viral diagnoses as false and clarifies that he is merely seeking guidance on his normalization of living around graveyards, which is harmless but abnormal to others. However, he does not consent to making public clarification. Prani also decides to resign as she and her family plans to move to Salatiga as Didit plans to start a new business. Her students come to salute and send her home as a farewell.

== Cast ==
- Sha Ine Febriyanti as Prani, a school teacher
- Angga Yunanda as Muklas, Prani's son
- Prilly Latuconsina as Tita, Prani's daughter
- Dwi Sasono as Didit, Prani's husband
- Omara Esteghlal as Gora
- Ari Lesmana as Tunas
- Nungki Kusumastuti as Tunggul

== Production ==
=== Development ===
After his debut feature film Photocopier in 2021, Bhanuteja began researching for his upcoming project and found many cyberbullying cases. He stated that he was inspired by the numerous cases of cyberbullying which frequently stemmed from viral videos. In October 2022, Singaporean film production company Momo Film boarded the project, announced it during the Busan Asian Contents and Film Market.

=== Filming ===
Principal photography took place between November and December 2022 in Yogyakarta, Indonesia. The selection of Yogyakarta as the backdrop for the story is intricately connected to Bhanuteja's personal background and roots in the city. Set against the backdrop of Yogyakarta, the film incorporates a balanced use of both Javanese and Indonesian languages in its dialogues, reflecting the depiction of everyday life and activities in both casual and formal settings.

== Release ==
Andragogy had its world premiere at the 2023 Toronto International Film Festival during the Discovery program on 9 September. It was selected as the opening film for 2023 Jakarta Film Week, scheduled for 25 October. The film also screened at the inaugural edition of SXSW Sydney 2023. Andragogy was released in Indonesian theaters on 2 November 2023 and on Netflix on 21 March 2024.

== Accolades ==
Award / Film Festival	Date of ceremony	Category	Recipient(s)	Result	Ref.
Indonesian Film Festival	14 November 2023	Best Picture	Adi Ekatama, Willawati, Ridla An-Nuur, and Nurita Anandia	Nominated	
Indonesian Film Festival	14 November 2023	Best Director	Wregas Bhanuteja	Nominated	
Indonesian Film Festival	14 November 2023	Best Actor	Angga Yunanda	Nominated	
Indonesian Film Festival	14 November 2023	Best Actress	Sha Ine Febriyanti	Won	
Indonesian Film Festival	14 November 2023	Best Supporting Actor	Dwi Sasono	Nominated	
Indonesian Film Festival	14 November 2023	Best Supporting Actor	Omara Esteghlal	Nominated	
Indonesian Film Festival	14 November 2023	Best Supporting Actress	Prilly Latuconsina	Won	
Indonesian Film Festival	14 November 2023	Best Original Screenplay	Wregas Bhanuteja	Nominated	
Indonesian Film Festival	14 November 2023	Best Cinematography	Gunnar Nimpuno	Nominated	
Indonesian Film Festival	14 November 2023	Best Film Editing	Ahmad Yuniardi	Nominated	
Indonesian Film Festival	14 November 2023	Best Visual Effects	Stefanus Binawan Utama	Nominated	
Indonesian Film Festival	14 November 2023	Best Sound	Sutrisno and Satrio Budiono	Nominated	
Indonesian Film Festival	14 November 2023	Best Theme Song	Gardika Gigih for "Dan Hujan"	Nominated	
Indonesian Film Festival	14 November 2023	Best Original Score	Yennu Ariendra	Nominated	
Indonesian Film Festival	14 November 2023	Best Art Direction	Dita Gambiro	Nominated	
Indonesian Film Festival	14 November 2023	Best Costume Design	Fadillah Putri Yunidar	Nominated	
Indonesian Film Festival	14 November 2023	Best Makeup	Astrid Sambudiono	Nominated	
International Film Festival of India	28 November 2023	IFFI Best Film Award	Andragogy	Nominated	
Film Pilihan Tempo	29 January 2024	Film Pilihan Tempo	Andragogy	Nominated	
Film Pilihan Tempo	29 January 2024	Best Director	Wregas Bhanuteja	Nominated	
Film Pilihan Tempo	29 January 2024	Best Screenplay	Wregas Bhanuteja	Nominated	
Film Pilihan Tempo	29 January 2024	Best Actress	Sha Ine Febriyanti	Nominated	
Film Pilihan Tempo	29 January 2024	Best Supporting Actor	Angga Yunanda	Nominated	
Film Pilihan Tempo	29 January 2024	Best Supporting Actor	Omara Esteghlal	Nominated	
Film Pilihan Tempo	29 January 2024	Best Supporting Actress	Prilly Latuconsina	Nominated	
Santa Barbara International Film Festival	17 February 2024	Jeffrey C. Barbakow Award – Best International Feature Film	Andragogy	Won	
Festival Film Bandung	9 November 2024	Highly Commended Film	Andragogy	Nominated	
Festival Film Bandung	9 November 2024	Highly Commended Director	Wregas Bhanuteja	Nominated	
Festival Film Bandung	9 November 2024	Highly Commended Screenplay	Wregas Bhanuteja	Nominated	
Festival Film Bandung	9 November 2024	Highly Commended Art Direction	Dita Gambiro	Nominated	
Festival Film Bandung	9 November 2024	Highly Commended Editing	Ahmad Yuniardi	Won	
