= Laura Basuki =

Indonesian model and actress

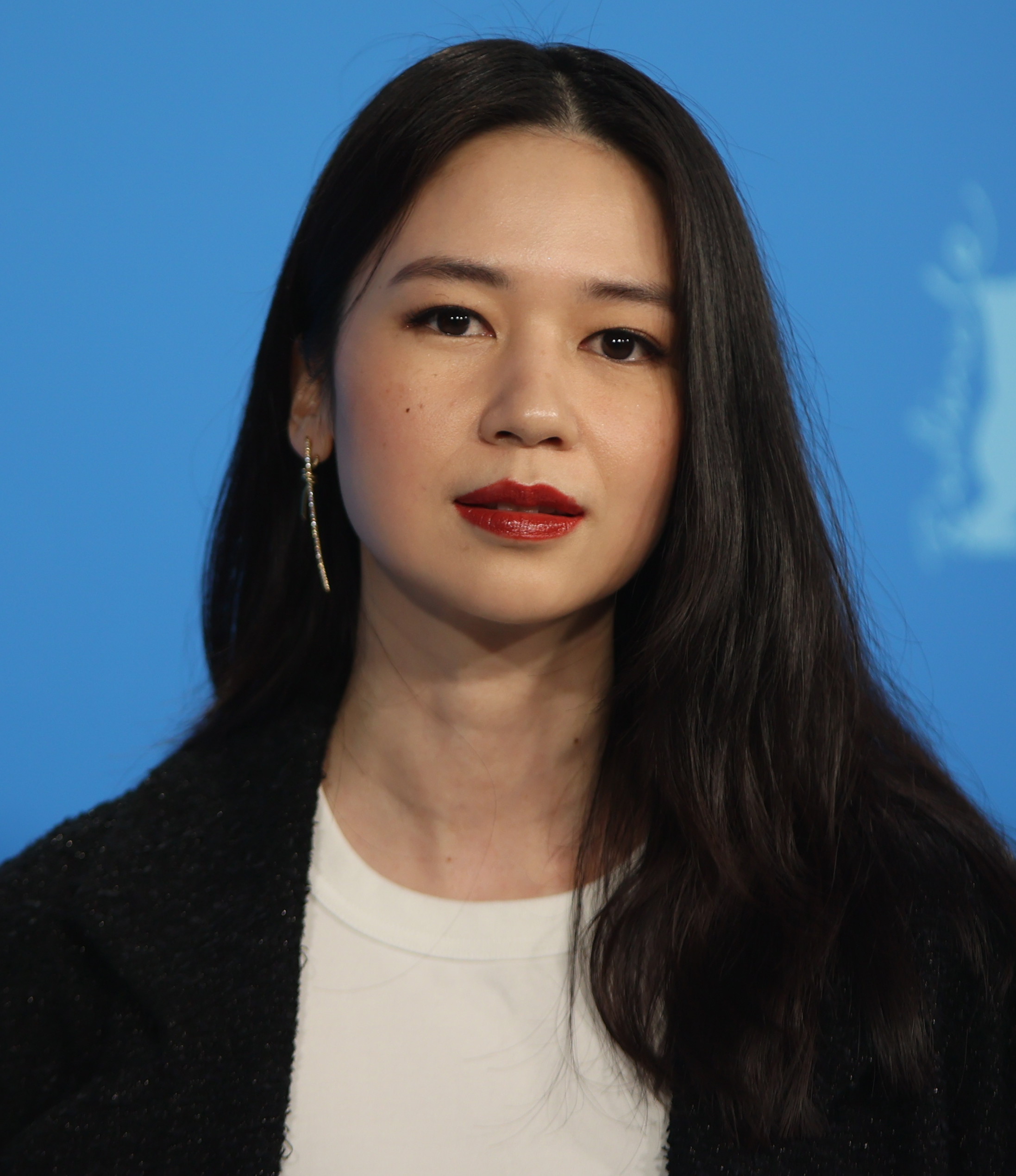
- Basuki at the 2022 Berlinale Film Festival
- Born: Laura Basuki; 9 January 1988 (age 38); West Berlin, West Germany
- Education: Atma Jaya University
- Occupations: Actress; model
- Years active: 2008–present
- Spouse: Leo Sandjaja (m. 2011)
- Children: Owen Sandjaja
- Awards: Citra Award for Best Leading Actress 2010 3 Hati Dua Dunia Satu Cinta 2020 Susi Susanti: Love All Silver Bear for Best Supporting Performance 2022 Before, Now & Then

Laura Basuki (born 9 January 1988) is an Indonesian model and actress of mixed Javanese, Chinese, and Vietnamese descent.

== Early life ==
Basuki was born in Berlin on 9 January 1988 to an Indonesian-Chinese dad and a Vietnamese mom. As a teenager, she intended to be a doctor. However, her mother pressured her into becoming a model. The 1.74 m (5 ft 8 1/2 in) tall Basuki, who weighed 49 kilograms (108 lb), enrolled at the OQ Modeling School in 2005.

== Career ==
Her first modelling job was at a bridal pageant showing the works of Bijan Wanaatmadja. This was followed by spots marketing products including Coca-Cola and Vaseline. As the modelling work kept her too busy to study medicine, Basuki began studying economics.

In 2008, Basuki was cast in her first role, Gara-Gara Bola (Because of Football), after the producer Nia Dinata saw Basuki's face in a magazine. She played the role of a bookie's wife after a month of coaching. Gara-Gara Bola garnered her two awards at the 2009 Indonesian Movie Awards.

Two years later, Basuki played a Catholic woman in love with a Muslim man in Tiga Hati, Dua Dunia, Satu Cinta (Three Hearts, Two Worlds, One Love), which was a critical success. For her work, Basuki received a Citra Award for Best Actress at the 2010 Indonesian Film Festival. Also in 2010, Basuki served as an emcee hosting a quiz show for the MNC Group; the programme, broadcast during the 2010 FIFA World Cup, was about football.

Basuki married businessman Leo Sanjaya in 2011. In early 2012, she played a journalist in Agus Kuntz' film Republik Twitter (The Twitter Republic). Basuki's fourth film, Di Timur Matahari (East of the Sun), debuted on 12 June 2012. A children's movie directed by Ari Sihasale, it followed Basuki's character Vina as she moved to Papua with her Papuan husband. For the shooting, she spent over a month in the mountainous inner regions of the island, bathing only weekly.

In 2013 she was in a film entitled Madre, and followed by a role in 2015's film Love and Faith. Later, she starred as badminton legend Susi Susanti in 2019's biopic film Susi Susanti: Love All. For her portrayal of Susanti, Basuki won the Citra Award for Best Actress in 2020.

In 2022, Basuki starred in Kamila Andini's Before, Now & Then, a beguiling drama set in 1960s Indonesia. The film had its international premiere at the 72nd Berlin International Film Festival. At the festival, Basuki was honored with Silver Bear for Best Supporting Performance.

== Filmography ==
=== Film ===
| Year | Title | Role |
|---|---|---|
| 2008 | Gara-gara Bola | Laura |
| 2010 | 3 Hati Dua Dunia, Satu Cinta | Delia |
| 2012 | Republik Twitter | Hanum |
| 2012 | Di Timur Matahari | Vina |
| 2013 | Madre | Meilan Tanuwidjaja |
| 2014 | Haji Backpacker | Suchun |
| 2015 | Love and Faith | Lim Kwee Ing |
| 2018 | Terbang: Menembus Langit | Candra Dewi |
| 2018 | Doyok Otoy Ali Oncom: Cari Jodoh | Ayu |
| 2018 | The Returning | Natalie |
| 2019 | Susi Susanti: Love All | Susi Susanti |
| 2022 | Before, Now & Then | Ino |
| 2022 | Cek Toko Sebelah 2 | Natalie |
| 2023 | Innocent Vengeance | Amanda |
| 2023 | Sleep Call | Dina |
| 2023 | 24 Hours with Gaspar | Kik |
| 2023 | Kapan Hamil? | Nadya |
| 2024 | Till Death Do Us Part | Renata |
| 2024 | Heartbreak Motel | Ava Alessandra |
| 2024 | Yohanna | Yohanna |
| 2026 | Red Before Dawn | |

=== Web series ===
| Year | Title | Role | Production | Network |
|---|---|---|---|---|
| 2018 | Sunshine | Matahari | VIU Indonesia | Viu |

=== FTV ===
| Year | Title | Role | Reference |
|---|---|---|---|
| 2011 | Antara Aku dan Bobo | Dindi | |
| 2011 | Mendadak Ningrat | Putri | |
| 2012 | Delman Cinta di Kota Kembang | Melati | |
| 2012 | Cinta Wedang Ronde | Cinta | |
| 2013 | 23 Hari Cinta Matematika | Rania | |
| 2016 | Love is Crazy | Kamelia | |

=== Commercial ===
- Lays
- Hadalabo
- Mandiri

=== Music video appearances ===
| Song title | Singer |
|---|---|
| "Hapus Aku" | Nidji |
| "Seandainya" | The Titans |
| "Kau" | T-Five |
| "Detik Terakhir" | Lyla |

== Awards and nominations ==
| Year | Award | Category | Work | Result |
|---|---|---|---|---|
| 2010 | Indonesian Film Festival | Citra Award for Best Leading Actress | 3 Hati Dua Dunia, Satu Cinta | Won |
| 2013 | Indonesian Film Festival | Citra Award for Best Leading Actress | Madre | Nominated |
| 2014 | Maya Award | Best Actress in a Supporting Role | Haji Backpacker | Nominated |
| 2018 | Maya Award | Best Actress in a Supporting Role | Terbang: Menembus Langit | Nominated |
| 2019 | Maya Award | Best Actress in a Leading Role | Susi Susanti: Love All | Nominated |
| 2020 | Indonesian Film Festival | Citra Award for Best Leading Actress | Susi Susanti: Love All | Won |
| 2022 | 72nd Berlin International Film Festival | Silver Bear for Best Supporting Performance | Before, Now & Then | Won |
| 2023 | Marie Claire Asia Star Awards | Asia Wide Award | 24 Hours with Gaspar | Won |
