= Buya Hamka Vol. 1 =

2023 biographical drama film

- Directed by: Fajar Bustomi
- Written by: Alim Sudio; Cassandra Massardi
- Produced by: Frederica; Chand Parwez Servia
- Starring: Vino G. Bastian; Laudya Cynthia Bella
- Cinematography: Ipung Rachmat Syaiful
- Edited by: Ryan Purwoko
- Music by: Purwacaraka
- Production companies: Falcon Pictures; Starvision; Indonesian Ulema Council
- Release date: 19 April 2023 (Indonesia)
- Running time: 106 minutes
- Country: Indonesia
- Language: Indonesian

Buya Hamka Vol. 1 is a 2023 biographical drama film directed by Fajar Bustomi and written by Alim Sudio with Cassandra Massardi. It stars Vino G. Bastian as Indonesian ulama and activist Hamka.

The film was theatrically released in Indonesia on 19 April 2023. It received five nominations at the 2023 Indonesian Film Festival, including Best Actor for Bastian.

== Premise ==
The film follows the life of Hamka during his time as a committee of Muhammadiyah in Makassar and the editor-in-chief of Pedoman Masyarakat magazine.

== Cast ==
- Vino G. Bastian as Abdul Malik Karim Amrullah / Hamka
- Laudya Cynthia Bella as Sitti Raham, Hamka's wife
- Donny Damara as Abdul Karim Amrullah / Haji Rasul, Muslim reformer
- Desy Ratnasari as Ummi Safiyah, Hamka's mother
- Ben Kasyafani as Zainuddin Labay El Yunusy / Asrul

== Production ==
=== Pre-production ===
The idea of creating a film about Hamka was first proposed in 2014 by the Indonesian Ulema Council (MUI), when Din Syamsuddin served as the chairman. Alim Sudio was appointed as the film screenwriter. It took three years to finish with a total of twelve script drafts.

In 2018, it was announced that Fajar Bustomi would direct the film.

=== Music ===
The film's score was composed by Purwacaraka and performed by Czech Symphony Orchestra.

=== Casting ===
The cast of Buya Hamka was announced in a press conference on 25 March 2019 in South Jakarta. Hamka was portrayed by Vino G. Bastian and he revealed that he was already offered the role in 2017 but turned down due to scheduling conflicts.

=== Filming ===
Principal photography began in April 2019 and took place in Semarang, Tegal, Sukabumi, Jakarta as well as the hometown of Hamka in Lake Maninjau, West Sumatra. The film was also shot in Cairo, Egypt, and involved Indonesian students. It concluded on 15 July 2019.

== Release ==
The film has a total duration of seven hours, therefore it is divided into three volumes.

Buya Hamka Vol. 1 was theatrically released in Indonesia on 19 April 2023 during the Eid al-Fitr week. It exceeded one million admissions two weeks after its theatrical release and garnered a total of 1.29 million during its run. The film was also released on Netflix on 17 August 2023. RCTI acquired the film's broadcasting rights, premiering it on 21 March 2026.

== Accolades ==
Award / Film Festival	Date of ceremony	Category	Recipient(s)	Result	Ref.
Indonesian Film Festival	14 November 2023	Best Actor	Vino G. Bastian	Nominated	
Indonesian Film Festival	14 November 2023	Best Adapted Screenplay	Alim Sudio and Cassandra Massardi	Nominated	
Indonesian Film Festival	14 November 2023	Best Cinematography	Ipung Rachmat Syaiful	Nominated	
Indonesian Film Festival	14 November 2023	Best Costume Design	Samuel Wattimena	Nominated	
Indonesian Film Festival	14 November 2023	Best Makeup	Jerry Oktavianus	Nominated	
