= Deadly Love Poetry =

2023 drama film

- Theatrical release poster
- Indonesian: Puisi Cinta yang Membunuh
- Directed by: Garin Nugroho
- Written by: Garin Nugroho
- Produced by: Chand Parwez Servia; Fiaz Servia
- Starring: Mawar de Jongh; Baskara Mahendra; Morgan Oey; Raihaanun
- Cinematography: Teoh Gay Hian
- Edited by: Wawan I. Wibowo
- Music by: Ricky Lionardi
- Production company: Starvision
- Release dates: 1 December 2022 (Jogja); 5 January 2023 (Indonesia)
- Running time: 105 minutes
- Country: Indonesia
- Language: Indonesian

Deadly Love Poetry (Indonesian: Puisi Cinta yang Membunuh) is a 2022 Indonesian psychological horror film written and directed by Garin Nugroho. It stars Mawar de Jongh, Baskara Mahendra, and Morgan Oey.

The film had its world premiere at the 17th Jogja-NETPAC Asian Film Festival. It received two nominations at the 2023 Indonesian Film Festival.

== Premise ==
Ranum easily falls into the sweet words of men. However, when they betray her, they meet their end at the hands of a mysterious figure.

== Cast ==
- Mawar de Jongh as Ranum / Ranting
- Baskara Mahendra as Hayat
- Morgan Oey as Rendy
- Raihaanun as Anna
- Ayu Laksmi as Laksmi
- Kelly Tandiono as Deren
- Unique Priscilla as Anna's mother
- Fergie Brittany as Ninin
- Imelda Therinne as Ranum / Ranting's mother
- Izabel Jahja as Ellen
- Samo Rafael as Mantram
- Yayu Unru as intel officer
- Eduwart Manalu as Ranum's father

== Release ==
The film had its world premiere at the 17th Jogja-NETPAC Asian Film Festival on 1 December 2022 during the Indonesian Film Showcase program. It was theatrically released in Indonesia on 5 January 2023. It also was screened at the 2023 International Film Festival Rotterdam during the Harbour program.

Netflix acquired the film's distribution rights, releasing it on 5 May 2023.

== Accolades ==
Award / Film Festival	Date of ceremony	Category	Recipient(s)	Result	Ref.
Indonesian Film Festival	14 November 2023	Best Art Direction	Vida Sylvia Theresia	Nominated	
Indonesian Film Festival	14 November 2023	Best Costume Design	Retno Ratih Damayanti	Won	
