= Antemas =

Indonesian entrepreneur

- Born: 20 October 1923; Amuntai, South Kalimantan, Dutch East Indies
- Died: 21 December 1970 (aged 47); Jakarta, Indonesia

Hajji Antemas (20 October 1923 – 21 December 1970) was an Indonesian entrepreneur. The Antemas Award (1974–1992) was named after him.

== Biography ==
Antemas was born in Amuntai, South Kalimantan, on 20 October 1923. He completed a junior high school education.

In the 1950s Antemas was the head of Mastraco, an import and export company, which entered the film industry in 1957. The company owned the Cathay Jakarta cinema and a film company, Pan Asiatic Film. Over the next thirteen years he took a variety of roles, including chairman of the All-Indonesia Cinema Owners' Association (Gabungan Pengusaha Bioskop Seluruh Indonesia, or GPBSI), as well as secretary general of both the Indonesian Film Import and Distribution Union (Persatuan Impor dan Distribusi Film Indonesia, or PIDFI) and the National Film Council (Badan Musyawarah Film Nasional).

During the 1960s Antemas, together with Naziruddin Naib and other film brokers who disapproved of the Communist Party of Indonesia's influence in the film industry, broke away from PIDFI (since renamed PIDFIN) and established the Association of Indonesian Film Importers, Producers, and Distributors (Gabungan Importir, Produser, dan Distributor Film Indonesia, or GIP-RODFIN). The author Eddie Karsito describes this as Antemas "bravely and openly challenging the Communist Party". Following the coup attempt on 30 September 1965, PIDFIN was banned, while GIP-RODFIN survived.

On 21 December 1970, while attending a meeting of the GPBSI in Jakarta, Antemas had a heart attack. He was declared dead in the meeting room.

Beginning in 1974, GPBSI awarded the Antemas Award during the Indonesian Film Festival. This award was granted to the film which had sold the most tickets in the preceding year. The award lasted until 1992. The last winner award was Garin Nugroho's Cinta dalam Sepotong Roti.

== Works cited ==
- "Antemas" (in Indonesian). Taman Ismail Marzuki. Archived from the original on 3 February 2014.
- Biran, Misbach Yusa, ed. (1979). Apa Siapa Orang Film Indonesia 1926–1978 [What and Who: Film Figures in Indonesia, 1926–1978]. Sinematek Indonesia. OCLC 6655859.
- Karsito, Eddie (2008). Menjadi Bintang [Becoming a Star] (in Indonesian). Jakarta: Ufuk Press. OCLC 318673348.
- "Penghargaan Cinta dalam Sepotong Roti" [Awards for Cinta dalam Sepotong Roti]. filmindonesia.or.id (in Indonesian). Konfiden Foundation. Archived from the original on 2 February 2014.
