= Kembang Kertas =

1984 film by Slamet Rahardjo

- Directed by: Slamet Rahardjo
- Written by: Putu Wijaya
- Produced by: Harris Lasmana
- Starring: Zainal Abidin; Lenny Marlina; Ria Irawan; Dewi Yull; Bangun Sugito
- Cinematography: Tantra Surjadi
- Production company: PT Nusantara Film
- Release date: 1984
- Running time: 104 minutes
- Country: Indonesia
- Language: Indonesian language

Kembang Kertas is a 1984 Indonesian drama film directed by Slamet Rahardjo. The film won five awards at the Indonesian Film Festival in 1985, including Best Feature Film.

== Accolades ==
| Award | Year | Category | Recipient | Result |
|---|---|---|---|---|
| Indonesian Film Festival | 1985 | Best Feature Film | | Won |
| Indonesian Film Festival | 1985 | Best Directing | Slamet Rahardjo | Won |
| Indonesian Film Festival | 1985 | Best Screenplay | Putu Wijaya | Won |
| Indonesian Film Festival | 1985 | Best Editing | B Benny MS | Won |
| Indonesian Film Festival | 1985 | Best Sound | Zakaria Rasyid | Won |
| Indonesian Film Festival | 1985 | Best Original Story | Slamet Rahardjo, Eros Djarot | Nominated |
| Indonesian Film Festival | 1985 | Best Lead Actor | Zainal Abidin | Nominated |
| Indonesian Film Festival | 1985 | Best Lead Actress | Dewi Yull | Nominated |
| Indonesian Film Festival | 1985 | Best Supporting Actress | Lenny Marlina | Nominated |
| Indonesian Film Festival | 1985 | Best Camera | Tantra Surjadi | Nominated |
| Indonesian Film Festival | 1985 | Best Music | Franki Raden | Nominated |
| Indonesian Film Festival | 1985 | Best Art Direction | Adji Mamat Borneo | Nominated |
