= Senyum di Pagi Bulan Desember =

1975 film by Wim Umboh

- Directed by: Wim Umboh
- Written by: Arifin C Noer
- Produced by: Wim Umboh
- Starring: Kusno Sudjarwadi; Rachmat Hidayat; Sukarno M Noor; Santi Sardi; Rahayu Effendi; Maruli Sitompul
- Cinematography: Lukman Hakim Nain
- Production company: PT International Aries Angkasa Film
- Release date: 1974
- Running time: 127 minutes
- Country: Indonesia
- Language: Indonesian language

Senyum di Pagi Bulan Desember is a 1974 Indonesian drama film directed by Wim Umboh. The film won three awards at the Indonesian Film Festival in 1975.

== Accolades ==
Award	Year	Category	Recipient	Result
Indonesian Film Festival	1975	Best Feature Film		Won
Indonesian Film Festival	1975	Best Music	Idris Sardi	Won
Indonesian Film Festival	1975	Best Actress	Santi Sardi	Won
Indonesian Journalists Association's Best Actor/Actress Awards	1975	Best Actress	Santi Sardi	Won
