= A Long Way to Come Home =

2023 drama film

- Theatrical release poster
- Directed by: Angga Dwimas Sasongko
- Written by: M. Irfan Ramli; Angga Dwimas Sasongko
- Based on: Nanti Kita Cerita tentang Hari Ini by Marchella FP
- Produced by: Tersi Eva Ranti
- Starring: Sheila Dara Aisha
- Cinematography: Arnand Pratikto
- Edited by: Hendra Adhi Susanto
- Music by: Abel Huray
- Production companies: Visinema Pictures; Legacy Pictures; XRM Media
- Distributed by: Netflix
- Release date: 2 February 2023 (Indonesia)
- Running time: 106 minutes
- Country: Indonesia
- Language: Indonesian

A Long Way to Come Home (Indonesian: Jalan yang Jauh, Jangan Lupa Pulang) is a 2023 Indonesian drama film directed by Angga Dwimas Sasongko and serves as the sequel of 2020 film One Day We'll Talk About Today.

Cast members Sheila Dara Aisha, Rio Dewanto, Rachel Amanda and Donny Damara reprise their roles from the first film, alongside new cast: Jerome Kurnia, Lutesha, and Ganindra Bimo. The film follows the life of Aurora after moving to London to pursue her study.

The film was theatrically released in Indonesia on 2 February 2023. It received four nominations at the 2023 Indonesian Film Festival.

== Premise ==
During her studies in London, Aurora finds obstacles after dating a mentally abusive man and struggling with her studies.

== Cast ==
- Sheila Dara Aisha as Aurora Narendra Putri, the middle child
- Jerome Kurnia as Rikitrong "Kit" Wagner, Aurora's best friend
- Lutesha as Ani Suryani / Honey, Aurora's best friend
- Rio Dewanto as Angkasa Narendra Putra, the eldest child
- Rachel Amanda as Awan Narendra Putri, the youngest child
- Ganindra Bimo as Jem, Aurora's mentally abusive boyfriend
- Donny Damara as Narendra

== Production ==
The project was first announced during a press conference on 24 November 2022, along with the cast announcement.

Principal photography took place in London and Jakarta.

== Release ==
A Long Way to Come Home was theatrically released in Indonesian on 2 February 2023. The film garnered 863,404 admissions during its theatrical run. Netflix acquired the film's distribution, releasing it on 1 June 2023. It also was released in Malaysian theatres on 9 February 2023.

The official poster alongside the release date was announced on 5 January 2023.

== Accolades ==
Award / Film Festival	Date of ceremony	Category	Recipient(s)	Result	Ref.
Indonesian Film Festival	14 November 2023	Best Adapted Screenplay	M. Irfan Ramli and Angga Dwimas Sasongko	Nominated	
Indonesian Film Festival	14 November 2023	Best Original Score	Abel Huray	Won	
Indonesian Film Festival	14 November 2023	Best Theme Song	Armand Maulana for "Rerata"	Nominated	
Indonesian Film Festival	14 November 2023	Best Theme Song	Yura Yunita, Donne Maula, and Marchella FP for "Jalan Pulang"	Won	
