= Angga Dwimas Sasongko =

Indonesian film director (born 1985)

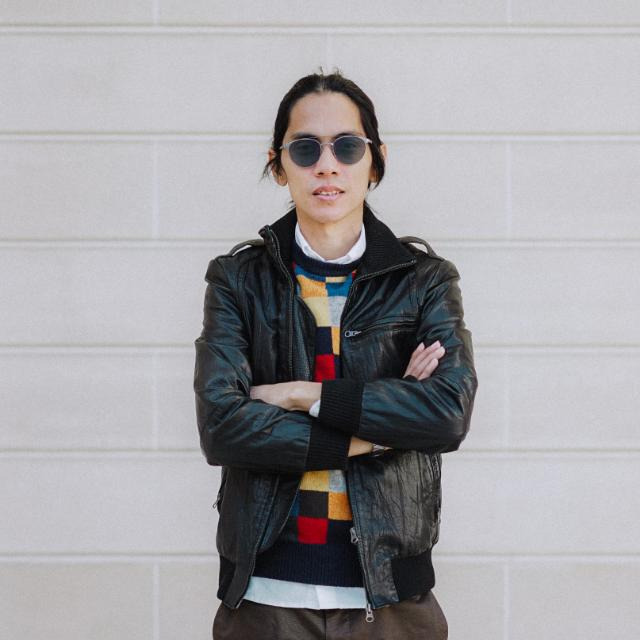
- Angga Dwimas Sasongko, IFFI (2015)
- Born: 11 January 1985 (age 41); Jakarta, Indonesia
- Occupation: Film director
- Awards: Citra Award, Usmar Ismail Award

Angga Dwimas Sasongko (born 11 January 1985) is an Indonesian film director. He studied at University of Indonesia with a major in political science. His career began when he was 19 years old. In 2008, he founded Visinema Pictures, a film production company based in Jakarta, Indonesia.

He has created dozens of TV commercial videos, hundreds of Music Videos, one feature documentary and five feature films. His second film, Hari Untuk Amanda (2010) was nominated in Citra Award 2010 for 8 categories including Best Director, Best Actor (Oka Antara), Best Actress (Fanny Fabriana) and Best Picture.

With his film Cahaya Dari Timur: Beta Maluku (We Are Moluccans), he became the youngest ever producer to win a Citra Award for Best Picture in Festival Film Indonesia, the country's most prestigious film award.

His other films also gained recognition and appreciation both from the Indonesian and international film industry, including Surat Dari Praha (Letters from Prague) (2016), Indonesia's official entry for the Academy Awards' Best Foreign Language Film. His other films are Hari Untuk Amanda (2009), Filosofi Kopi (2015), Bukaan 8 (2017) and Filosofi Kopi 2: Ben & Jodi (2017).

He is one of Indonesia's most respected film directors and the first in the country to collaborate with Fox International Production for Wiro Sableng (212 Warrior) (2018).

== Biography ==
Angga won his first award when Cahaya Dari Timur: Beta Maluku (We Are Moluccans) awarded the Best Picture award at the 2014 Indonesian Film Festival (FFI).

In 2014, Angga directing and producing Filosofi Kopi, an adaptation of Dewi "Dee" Lestari's eponymous short story. The movie also received both national and international award, as well as two Citra Awards for best adapted screenplay (Jenny Jusuf) and best editing (Ahsan Andrian) at the 2016 Indonesian Film Festival (FFI). Filosofi Kopi has been screened in many International Film Festival, including Taipei Golden Horse Film Festival and BiFan.

In 2016, Angga directing Surat dari Praha (Letters from Prague), a film dealing with the expulsion of Indonesian students from the country in 1965. The movie earned critical success and won numerous awards including Best Film, Best Actor and Best Director at the 2016 Usmar Ismail Award.

Angga also known as an activist who work for Green Music Foundation that he managed together with musician Glenn Fredly. Green Music Foundation, initiated a social movement named Save Mentawai in response to the 2010 Mentawai earthquake and tsunami. Angga also known as initiator of Pondok Cerdas Indonesia atau PONDASI Project, a library based community learning center built in several rural area, the library built for the first time in South Mapinang Village and Pasapuat Village, Mentawai.

== Awards and nominations ==
Year	Award	Category	Recipients	Result
2010	Indonesian Film Festival	Citra Award for Best Director	Hari untuk Amanda	Nominated
2015	Indonesian Film Festival	Citra Award for Best Director	Filosofi Kopi	Nominated
2023	Indonesian Film Festival	Best Adapted Screenplay	A Long Way to Come Home	Nominated

== Filmography ==
- Foto Kotak dan Jendela (2006)
- Jelangkung 3 (2007)
- Musik Hati (2008)
- Hari Untuk Amanda (2009)
- Cahaya Dari Timur: Beta Maluku (2013)
- Filosofi Kopi (2015)
- Surat Dari Praha (2016)
- Bukaan 8 (2017)
- Filosofi Kopi 2 (2017)
- 212 Warrior (2018)
- One Day We'll Talk About Today (2020)
- Stealing Raden Saleh (2022)
- Ben & Jody (2022)
- A Long Way to Come Home (2023)
- 13 Bombs in Jakarta (2023)
- Heartbreak Motel (2024)
- Brownies 2 (2026)
