= Czech Symphony Orchestra (1994) =

Classical orchestra based in Prague

The Czech Symphony Orchestra (Czech: Český symfonický orchestr, short: ČSO) is a classical orchestra based in Prague.

As an ensemble put together for various international recording and concert projects, it has been active since 1994. The orchestra was composed of musicians with recording as well as concert experience and has worked with conductors like Erwin Gutawa. Currently under the leadership of Michaela Růžičková the orchestra's latest projects involved film music recordings for internationally successful Czech movies like Lidice.
