= Indonesian Film Board =

- Badan Perfilman Indonesia
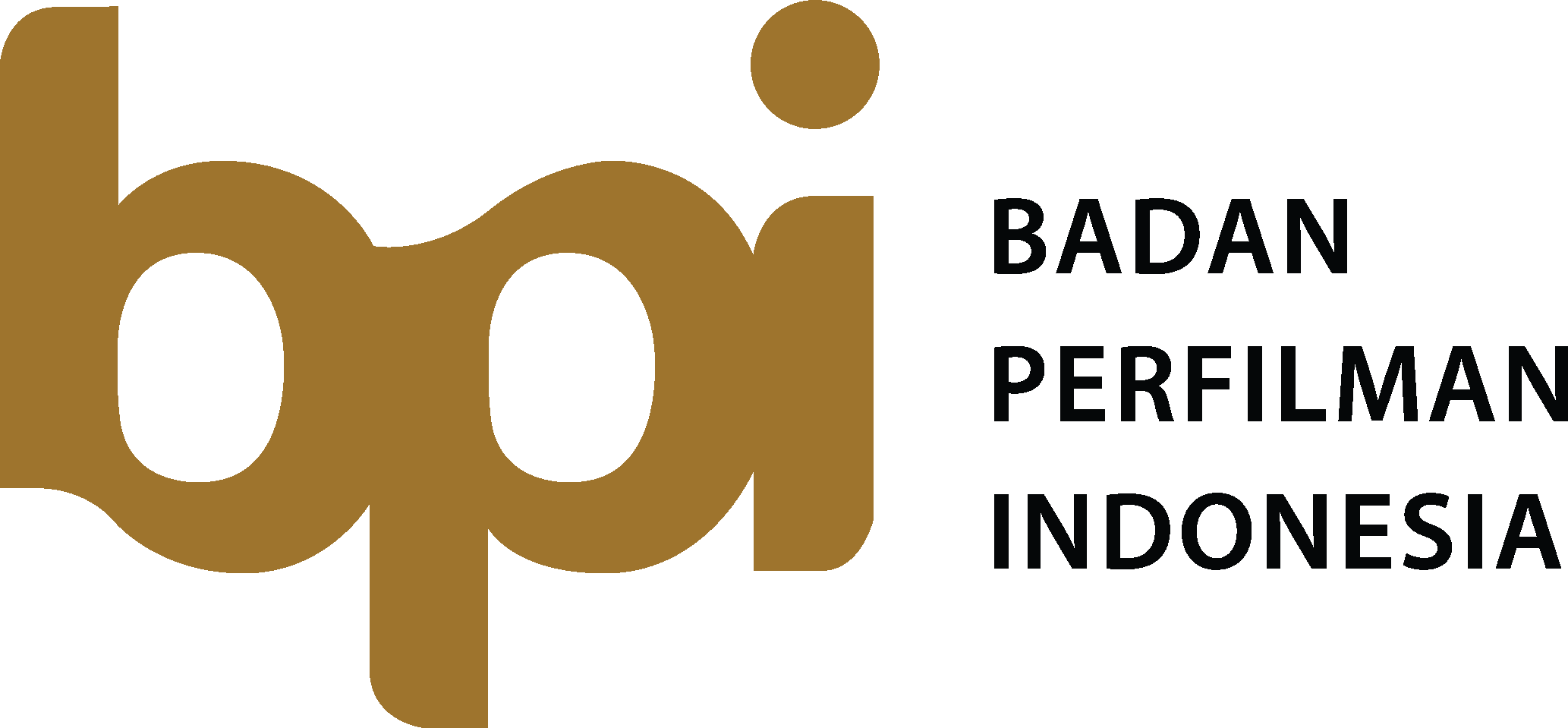

Independent private institution overview
- Formed: January 17, 2014
- Headquarters: Jakarta, Indonesia
- Key document: Law No.33/2009 on Cinema
- Website: www.bpi.or.id

The Indonesian Film Board (Indonesian: Badan Perfilman Indonesia; BPI) is an independent private institution responsible for cultivating a strong, competitive, and culturally impactful film industry in Indonesia. It also serves as a platform for film organizations and professional associations across the country. Its primary duties and functions include organizing domestic film festivals, representing Indonesian cinema at international festivals, promoting Indonesia as a prime shooting location for foreign film productions to stimulate local film-related businesses, advising on industry development, recognizing film achievements, and facilitating funding for exceptional films which contribute to the national film culture. The board is officially recognized by the president of Indonesia.

The board was formed under Law No.33/2009 on Cinema. According to Article 67 of said law, the public has a role to play in film organization, and to strengthen this participation, the Indonesian Film Board was thus formed (as per Article 68). Although mandated by the Cinema Law in 2009, the Indonesian Film Board was only officially established five years later on January 17, 2014, during the closing session of the two-day General Assembly on its establishment, which took place from January 15 to 17, 2014, in Jakarta.

== Legal Issues ==
The Indonesian Film Board's legal status as an "independent private institution" as stated in Article 68(3) of the Cinema Law has led to government officials misinterpreting this as meaning that the board is ineligible for government funding. As a result, government ministries have been reluctant to allocate funds. However, Article 70(2) of the Cinema Law and a subsequent presidential decree explicitly allow the board to receive funding from state and regional budgets. Despite these provisions however, the board received no financial support from the government during its early years.

To prevent further confusion, there have been calls to redesignate the board's status as a Non-ministerial Government Institution or as a State Institution. Such a redesignation would clarify the board's eligibility for government support.
