= Letters from Prague =

2016 film

- Film poster
- Directed by: Angga Dwimas Sasongko
- Written by: M Irfan Ramli
- Produced by: Angga Dwimas Sasongko; Anggia Kharisma; Handoko Hendroyono; Chicco Jerikho; Glenn Fredly
- Starring: Julie Estelle; Tio Pakusadewo; Widyawati; Rio Dewanto
- Cinematography: Ivan Anwal Pane
- Edited by: Ahsan Andrian
- Music by: Glenn Fredly
- Release date: 28 January 2016
- Running time: 93 Minutes
- Country: Indonesia
- Languages: Indonesian; Czech; English

Letters from Prague (Indonesian: Surat dari Praha) is a 2016 Indonesian drama film directed by Angga Dwimas Sasongko. It was selected as the Indonesian entry for the Best Foreign Language Film at the 89th Academy Awards but it was not nominated.

== Plot ==
The will of Sulastri Kusumaningrum, the mother of Kemala Dahayu Larasati (colloquially Laras), states that she bequeathed her house to Laras, with the condition that she send a box of old letters to Mahdi Jayasri (colloquially Jaya), an old man living in Prague who works at a stage theater. Though eager of the bequest following her divorce with an unfaithful husband, Laras is reluctant of the condition, but nevertheless accepts. The passive-aggressive Jaya rejects the presence of the letters, then grieve alone. Laras angrily goes to a hotel, but finds herself in culture shock, prompting Jaya to allow her to stay in his apartment.

Alone, Laras decides to read the letters herself. It is revealed that Jaya was Sulastri's fiance who failed to fulfill his promise to return decades ago due to Indonesia's transition to the New Order, where Suharto opposers are banned from Indonesia. He, alongside three other peers, exited Indonesia via the Port of Belawan emigrating to Czechoslovakia, living in exile in Prague. Laras concludes that her mother used to lock herself daily waiting for Jaya's return, harming her parents' psychology and household. Jaya says he refused to accept the letters as he had let go of his past, but after a painful lecture by Laras, he tearfully accepts.

After cooling off the next day, Jaya invites Laras to a casual lunch, where she learns the internal, caring attitude Jaya has. Jaya later tells more of his stories to Laras, and the consequences of his opposition towards Suharto, though is satisfied with his decision. In exchange, Laras tells her stories to Jaya offscreen. Both feel an internal connection between them, leading to Jaya writing a song dedicated to Laras. Concluding the day, Jaya commits to treating Laras as his daughter; Laras accepts.

The next morning, Laras tells Jaya to forgive the past and return to Indonesia. Jaya angrily confronts her, expressing hate towards Indonesia. Laras concludes that he is unable to forgive himself. Jaya reads a reply letter from Sulastri, where it is revealed that Laras' full name is the one Jaya wanted for her possible daughter. Sulastri purposefully told Laras to fly to Prague to send Jaya's letters, hoping that by meeting her, he can forgive the past and quell his anger. Jaya stops the fleeing Laras and they both reconcile.

== Cast ==
=== Main ===
- Tio Pakusadewo as Jaya

A former Indonesian student in the 1960s who was exiled in Prague

- Julie Estelle as Larasati

A divorced woman trying to fulfill her deceased mother's last wish to deliver a box filled with letters from her past to an old man living in Prague

- Widyawati as Sulastri

Larasati's mother and Jaya's former fiance

- Rio Dewanto as Dewa

An Indonesian student working as a part-time bartender in Prague

=== Supporting ===
- Chicco Jerikho as Rama, Larasati's ex-husband
- Jajang C. Noer
- Shafira Umm

== Awards and nominations ==
| Year | Award | Category | Recipient(s) and nominee(s) | Result | Ref(s) |
|---|---|---|---|---|---|
| 2016 | Usmar Ismail Awards | Best Film | Letters From Prague | Won | |
| 2016 | Usmar Ismail Awards | Best Director | Angga Dwimas Sasongko | Won | |
| 2016 | Usmar Ismail Awards | Best Actor | Tio Pakusadewo | Won | |
| 2016 | Usmar Ismail Awards | Best Supporting Actress | Widyawati | Nominated | |
| 2016 | Usmar Ismail Awards | Best Editing | Ahsan Andrian | Nominated | |
| 2016 | Usmar Ismail Awards | Best Sound | Satrio Budiono | Nominated | |
| 2016 | Usmar Ismail Awards | Best Music | Thoersi Argeswara; Glenn Fredly | Nominated | |
| 2016 | 2016 Indonesian Movie Awards | Best Actor | Tio Pakusadewo | Nominated | |
| 2016 | 2016 Indonesian Movie Awards | Best Actress | Julie Estelle | Nominated | |
| 2016 | 2016 Indonesian Movie Awards | Most Favorite Actor | Tio Pakusadewo | Nominated | |
| 2016 | 2016 Indonesian Movie Awards | Most Favorite Actress | Julie Estelle | Won | |
| 2016 | 2016 Indonesian Movie Awards | Most Favorite Film | Letters from Prague | Nominated | |
| 2016 | 2016 Indonesian Movie Awards | Best Chemistry | Tio Pakusadewo; Julie Estelle | Nominated | |
| 2016 | 2016 Indonesian Movie Awards | Lifetime Achievement | Widyawati | Recipient | |

== See also ==
- List of submissions to the 89th Academy Awards for Best Foreign Language Film
- List of Indonesian submissions for the Academy Award for Best Foreign Language Film
