= Film Pilihan Tempo =

Indonesian film prize

- Awarded for: Achievement in Indonesian cinema
- Country: Indonesia
- Presented by: Tempo
- First award: 2000

Film Pilihan Tempo (English: Best Film According to Tempo) is an Indonesian film prize awarded each year by the magazine Tempo since 2000 as a year-end list. In 2017, the inaugural award ceremony was held, billed as Tempo Film Festival.

== History ==
Indonesian magazine Tempo first introduced its Film Pilihan Tempo in 2000 to celebrate the achievements in Indonesian cinema. In 2010, it added new categories, including Best Director, Best Actress, and Best Actor. In 2017, Tempo held its inaugural award ceremony at the Epicentrum XXI, South Jakarta, on 27 November, now known as Festival Film Tempo. Starting in 2019, the award ceremony is no longer held, the award name was changed back to Film Pilihan Tempo, and the winners are now announced in Tempo magazine.

== Award categories ==
Awards are presented for the following categories:

=== Current categories ===
- Film Pilihan Tempo (Best Film According to Tempo)
- Best Director
- Best Leading Actor
- Best Leading Actress
- Best Supporting Actor
- Best Supporting Actress
- Best Screenplay

=== Discontinued categories ===
- Best Child Performer (2017–2018)

== Overview ==
Year	Date	Film Pilihan Tempo	Venue	Ref.
2017	27 November 2017	Marlina the Murderer in Four Acts	Studio 1 Epicentrum XXI, South Jakarta	
2018	6 December 2018	Memories of My Body	Studio 1 Epicentrum XXI, South Jakarta	
2019	16 December 2019	The Science of Fictions	Not held	
2020	21 December 2020	Mecca I'm Coming	Not held	
2021	20 December 2021	Photocopier	Not held	
2022	18 December 2022	Autobiography	Not held	
2023	29 January 2024	Women from Rote Island	Not held	
2024	5 February 2025	Yohanna	Graha Bhakti Budaya, Ismail Marzuki Park, Central Jakarta	
2025	26 January 2026	On Your Lap	Graha Bhakti Budaya, Ismail Marzuki Park, Central Jakarta	
