= Indonesian Film Festival =

Indonesian awards given annually for excellence in cinematic achievements

- Citra Awards and Vidia Awards
- Awarded for: Excellence in cinematic achievements
- Country: Indonesia
- Presented by: Ministry of Culture; Indonesian Film Board
- First award: 1955 (Citra Awards); 1986 (Vidia Awards)
- Website: festivalfilm.id

The Indonesian Film Festival (Indonesian: Festival Film Indonesia, 'FFI') is an annual awards ceremony organised by the Ministry of Culture and Indonesian Film Board to celebrate cinematic achievements in the Indonesian film industry. During the festival, the Citra Awards winners are announced and the best Indonesian films of the year are presented.

The awards ceremony was first held in 1955 as the Pekan Apresiasi Film Nasional (National Film Appreciation Week). It changed to Festival Film Indonesia in 1973. In 1986, the festival included awards for television movies called Vidia Awards.

== History ==
In 1955, 1960, and 1967, Pekan Apresiasi Film Nasional (English: National Film Appreciation Week) was held in Jakarta. From 1973 to 1992, the ceremony was renamed Festival Film Indonesia and became an annual event. The trophy/ award was named Piala Citra (Citra Award). The All-Indonesia Cinema Owners' Association (Gabungan Pengusaha Bioskop Seluruh Indonesia, or GPBSI) awarded the Antemas Prize, named for the producer Antemas. From 1993 to 2003, the festival did not take place because the quantity of good Indonesian movies had dropped significantly. In the 1990s, most Indonesian movie producers created low budget, B movies. Producers suffered revenue losses because of growing piracy. Since 1992, American, Hong Kong, and Taiwanese movies have taken over many theaters. Low budget Indonesian movies get the dregs, such as open theatre cinemas, portable cinemas, direct to video, or on TV. In 2004 the Indonesian Film Festival committee launched and returned the event to an annual affair. In 2014 the Indonesian Film Board was formed and FFI changed the award statuette. In 2017 the Indonesian Film Board added two more awards for unique and creative films, raising the total to 21. In 2018 awards were given in 23 categories.

== Citra Awards ==
Citra Awards are accolades by the Committee to recognize excellence of professionals in the Indonesian film industry, including directors, actors and writers.

In 2009, the Indonesian Film Festival Committee replaced the National Body of Motion Picture as the official event organizer of the Indonesian Film Festival. The Committee was authorized by the Ministry of Culture and Tourism of Indonesia to organize the operational process of Citra Awards' ceremony and the selection (voting) of nominations and winners.

In 2014, the Indonesian Film Board replaced the Indonesian Film Festival Committee as the festival organizer. The festival is audited by Deloitte. The Ministry of Tourism of Indonesia oversees the organizer.

The Citra Awards, often mistakenly called the FFI Awards (Indonesian Film Festival), is the title of the event where the Citra Awards and Vidia Awards winners are announced.

=== Current awards ===
The categories of Citra Awards are:

- Best Picture (in Indonesian: Film Bioskop Terbaik): 1955 to present
- Best Director (Penyutradaraan Terbaik): 1955 to present
- Best Actor (Pemeran Utama Pria Terbaik): 1955 to present
- Best Actress (Pemeran Utama Wanita Terbaik): 1955 to present
- Best Supporting Actor (Pemeran Pendukung Pria Terbaik): 1955 to present
- Best Supporting Actress (Pemeran Pendukung Wanita Terbaik): 1955 to present
- Best Art Direction (Tata Artistik Terbaik): 1955 to present
- Best Cinematography (Tata Sinematografi Terbaik): 1955 to present
- Best Editing (Penyuntingan Terbaik): 1955 to present
- Best Original Score (Tata Musik Terbaik): 1955 to present
- Best Sound (Tata Suara Terbaik): 1955 to present
- Best Short Film (Film Pendek Terbaik): 2004 to present
- Best Documentary Feature Film (Film Dokumenter Panjang Terbaik): 2006 to 2013, 2015 to present
- Best Original Screenplay (Skenario Asli Terbaik): 2006 to present
- Best Adapted Screenplay (Skenario Adaptasi Terbaik): 2006 to present
- Best Documentary Short Film (Film Dokumenter Pendek Terbaik): 2009, 2013, 2015 to present
- Best Animated Film (Film Animasi Terbaik): 2013 to present
- Best Visual Effects (Tata Efek Visual Terbaik): 2013 to present
- Best Costume Design (Tata Busana Terbaik): 2013 to present
- Best Original Theme Song (Lagu Tema Orisinal Terbaik): 2016 to present
- Best Makeup & Hairstyling (Tata Rias Terbaik): 2017 to present

=== Retired awards ===
- Best Screenplay (Skenario Terbaik): 1955 to 2008
- Best Documentary (Film Dokumenter Terbaik): 2014

=== Special awards ===
- Njoo Han Siang Special Award (Penghargaan Khusus Njoo Han Siang): 2006
- Best Film Critic (Kritik Film Terbaik): 2006
- Lifetime Achievement Award (Penghargaan untuk Pencapaian Seumur Hidup): 2006, 2009 to 2011, 2014, 2017 to 2019
- Best Feature Film Director (Penyutradaraan Terbaik): 2007
- Best Animated Film (Film Animasi Terbaik): 2008
- Best Thematic Short Film (Tema Film Pendek Terbaik): 2008
- Best Short Film Director (Sutradara Film Pendek Terbaik): 2009
- Best New Director (Sutradara Baru Terbaik): 2009, 2011
- Best Children's Film (Film Anak-anak Terbaik): 2009
- Special Documentary Film Award (Penghargaan Khusus Film Dokumenter): 2011
- Special Talent Award (Penghargaan Khusus Pemain Berbakat): 2011
- Best Child Performers (Pemeran Anak-Anak Terbaik): 2014

=== Award records ===
==== By films ====
The following films received at least twelve nominations:

| Nominations | Film | Year |
|---|---|---|
| 17 | Andragogy | 2023 |
| 17 | Grave Torture | 2024 |
| 17 | Impetigore | 2020 |
| 17 | Photocopier | 2021 |
| 16 | Ali & Ratu Ratu Queens | 2021 |
| 14 | Kartini | 2017 |
| 14 | Marlina the Murderer in Four Acts | 2018 |
| 14 | Yuni | 2021 |
| 13 | How Funny (This Country Is) | 2010 |
| 13 | Satan's Slaves | 2017 |
| 13 | Shackled | 2013 |
| 13 | Soekarno | 2014 |
| 13 | Susi Susanti: Love All | 2020 |
| 12 | Borderless Fog | 2024 |
| 12 | Memories of My Body | 2019 |
| 12 | Ruma Maida | 2009 |
| 12 | The Shadow Strays | 2025 |
| 12 | The Siege at Thorn High | 2025 |
| 12 | This Earth of Mankind | 2019 |
| 12 | Two Blue Stripes | 2019 |
| 12 | Vengeance Is Mine, All Others Pay Cash | 2022 |
| 12 | What's Up with Love? | 2004 |

The following films received at least five awards:

| Awards | Title |
|---|---|
| 12 | Photocopier |
| 10 | Marlina the Murderer in Four Acts |
| 9 | Ibunda |
| 8 | Memories of My Body |
| 8 | Pacar Ketinggalan Kereta |
| 7 | 3 Hati Dua Dunia, Satu Cinta |
| 7 | Falling In Love Like In Movies |
| 7 | Satan's Slaves |
| 6 | Athirah |
| 6 | Di Balik Kelambu |
| 6 | Impetigore |
| 6 | Night Bus |
| 6 | Tanah Surga... Katanya |
| 5 | Arisan! |
| 5 | Before, Now & Then |
| 5 | The Siege at Thorn High |
| 5 | Vengeance Is Mine, All Others Pay Cash |

== Vidia Awards ==
Vidia Awards recognize excellence in the Indonesian television movie industry, including directors, actors and writers. Vidia Awards were first presented in 1986 and awarded in one event with Citra Awards.

From 1992 until 1998, the award was presented separately in an event called Festival Sinetron Indonesia (Indonesian Soap-Opera Festival). The awards were discontinued from 1998 to 2003. The awards returned between 2004 and 2006, then discontinued between 2007 and 2010, and made its return in 2011. The awards were last given in 2014.

== See also ==
- Cinema of Indonesia
- Jakarta International Film Festival
