= 2011 Indonesian Movie Awards =

Film industry award ceremony

5th Annual Indonesian Movie Awards
- Date: May 10, 2011
- Location: Tennis Indoor Senayan, Central Jakarta
- Country: Indonesia
- Hosted by: Okky Lukman; Choky Sitohang

Television/radio coverage
- Network: RCTI

The 5th Annual Indonesian Movie Awards was held on May 10, 2011, at the Tennis Indoor Senayan, Central Jakarta. The award show was hosted by Okky Lukman and Choky Sitohang.

7 Hati 7 Cinta 7 Wanita lead nominations with receiving of a total of sixteen nominations, a new record broke the record of eleven nominations for Berbagi Suami in the 2007 of celebration. Three other films competing at the rear, each with receiving of eleven nominations: 3 Hati Dua Dunia, Satu Cinta, Alangkah Lucunya (Negeri Ini), and Minggu Pagi di Victoria Park.

The winners were announced on May 10, 2011. The film 7 Hati 7 Cinta 7 Wanita and Minggu Pagi di Victoria Park were the biggest winners, each receiving four trophies. The films 3 Hati Dua Dunia, Satu Cinta and Alangkah Lucunya (Negeri Ini) each received two trophies.

== Nominees and winners ==
=== Best ===
Winners are listed first and highlighted in boldface.

Best Actor	Best Actress
**Reza Rahadian – 3 Hati Dua Dunia, Satu Cinta**; Lukman Sardi – Darah Garuda; Lukman Sardi – Sang Pencerah; Reza Rahadian – Alangkah Lucunya (Negeri Ini); Vino G. Bastian – Satu Jam Saja	**Titi Sjuman – Minggu Pagi di Victoria Park**; Alexandra Gottardo – Tanah Air Beta; Jajang C. Noer – 7 Hati 7 Cinta 7 Wanita; Laura Basuki – 3 Hati Dua Dunia, Satu Cinta; Wulan Guritno – Demi Dewi
Best Supporting Actor	Best Supporting Actress
**Tio Pakusadewo – Alangkah Lucunya (Negeri Ini)**; Donny Alamsyah – Minggu Pagi di Victoria Park; Jaja Mihardja – Alangkah Lucunya (Negeri Ini); Rasyid Karim – 3 Hati Dua Dunia, Satu Cinta; Teuku Rifnu Wikana – Darah Garuda	**Happy Salma – 7 Hati 7 Cinta 7 Wanita**; Henidar Amroe – 3 Hati Dua Dunia, Satu Cinta; Imelda Soraya – Minggu Pagi di Victoria Park; Olga Lydia – 7 Hati 7 Cinta 7 Wanita; Ully Artha – Bebek Belur
Best Newcomer Actor	Best Newcomer Actress
**Rangga Djoned – 7 Hati 7 Cinta 7 Wanita**; Albert Halim – 7 Hati 7 Cinta 7 Wanita; Ihsan Taroreh – Sang Pencerah	**Fitri Bagus – Minggu Pagi di Victoria Park**; Ella Hamid – Minggu Pagi di Victoria Park; Intan Kieflie – 7 Hati 7 Cinta 7 Wanita; Kimmy Jayanti – I Know What You Did on Facebook; Ratu Tika Bravani – Alangkah Lucunya (Negeri Ini)
Best Chemistry	Special Award: Best Children Role
**Griffit Patricia and Yehuda Rumbindi – Tanah Air Beta**; Happy Salma and Rangga Djoned – 7 Hati 7 Cinta 7 Wanita; Laura Basuki and Reza Rahadian – 3 Hati Dua Dunia, Satu Cinta	**Angga Putra – Alangkah Lucunya (Negeri Ini)**; Aldy Zulfikar – Darah Garuda; Griffit Patricia – Tanah Air Beta; Irfan Siagian – Alangkah Lucunya (Negeri Ini); Monica Sayangbati – Obama Anak Menteng

=== Favorite ===
Winners are listed first and highlighted in boldface.

Favorite Actor	Favorite Actress
**Vino G. Bastian – Satu Jam Saja**; Lukman Sardi – Darah Garuda; Lukman Sardi – Sang Pencerah; Reza Rahadian – 3 Hati Dua Dunia, Satu Cinta; Reza Rahadian – Alangkah Lucunya (Negeri Ini)	**Wulan Guritno – Demi Dewi**; Alexandra Gottardo – Tanah Air Beta; Jajang C. Noer – 7 Hati 7 Cinta 7 Wanita; Laura Basuki – 3 Hati Dua Dunia, Satu Cinta; Titi Sjuman – Minggu Pagi di Victoria Park
Favorite Supporting Actor	Favorite Supporting Actress
**Donny Alamsyah – Minggu Pagi di Victoria Park**; Jaja Mihardja – Alangkah Lucunya (Negeri Ini); Rasyid Karim – 3 Hati Dua Dunia, Satu Cinta; Teuku Rifnu Wikana – Darah Garuda; Tio Pakusadewo – Alangkah Lucunya (Negeri Ini)	**Happy Salma – 7 Hati 7 Cinta 7 Wanita**; Henidar Amroe – 3 Hati Dua Dunia, Satu Cinta; Imelda Soraya – Minggu Pagi di Victoria Park; Olga Lydia – 7 Hati 7 Cinta 7 Wanita; Ully Artha – Bebek Belur
Favorite Newcomer Actor/Actress	Favorite Chemistry
**Ihsan Taroreh – Sang Pencerah**; **Ella Hamid – Minggu Pagi di Victoria Park**; Albert Halim – 7 Hati 7 Cinta 7 Wanita; Fitri Bagus – Minggu Pagi di Victoria Park; Intan Kieflie – 7 Hati 7 Cinta 7 Wanita; Kimmy Jayanti – I Know What You Did on Facebook; Ratutika Bravani – Alangkah Lucunya (Negeri Ini); Rangga Djoned – 7 Hati 7 Cinta 7 Wanita	**Happy Salma and Rangga Djoned – 7 Hati 7 Cinta 7 Wanita**; Griffit Patricia and Yehuda Rumbindi – Tanah Air Beta; Laura Basuki and Reza Rahadian – 3 Hati Dua Dunia, Satu Cinta
Favorite Soundtrack	Favorite Film
**"Cinta Takkan Salah" performed by Gita Gutawa and Derby Romero – Love in Perth**; "Dalam Mihrab Cinta" performed by Afgan – Dalam Mihrab Cinta; "Jangan Pergi" performed by D'Masiv – Demi Dewi; "Tuhan Maha Cinta" performed by Nidji – Sang Pencerah; "Love Story" performed by Melly Goeslaw and Irwansyah – Love Story	**3 Hati Dua Dunia, Satu Cinta**; 7 Hati 7 Cinta 7 Wanita; Alangkah Lucunya (Negeri Ini); Minggu Pagi di Victoria Park; Sang Pencerah; Tanah Air Beta

== Film with most nominations and awards ==
=== Most nominations ===
The following film received most nominations:

Nominations	Film
16	7 Hati 7 Cinta 7 Wanita
11	3 Hati Dua Dunia, Satu Cinta
11	Alangkah Lucunya (Negeri Ini)
11	Minggu Pagi di Victoria Park
6	Tanah Air Beta
5	Darah Garuda
5	Sang Pencerah
3	Demi Dewi
2	Bebek Belur
2	Satu Jam Saja

=== Most wins ===
The following film received most nominations:

Awards	Film
4	7 Hati 7 Cinta 7 Wanita
4	Minggu Pagi di Victoria Park
2	3 Hati Dua Dunia, Satu Cinta
2	Alangkah Lucunya (Negeri Ini)
