= 2008 Indonesian Movie Awards =

Film industry award ceremony

2nd Annual Indonesian Movie Awards
- Date: March 28, 2008
- Location: Plenary Hall, Jakarta Convention Center, Central Jakarta
- Country: Indonesia
- Hosted by: Nirina Zubir; Choky Sitohang; Wulan Guritno; Ringgo Agus Rahman

Television/radio coverage
- Network: RCTI

The 2nd Annual Indonesian Movie Awards was held on March 28, 2008, at the Plenary Hall, Jakarta Convention Center, Central Jakarta. The award show was hosted by Nirina Zubir, Choky Sitohang, Wulan Guritno, and Ringgo Agus Rahman. And the nominations have been announced for the category of Favorite, which will be chosen by the public via SMS. As for the category of Best, will be selected by a jury that has been appointed. For the category which contested are the same as last year's celebration.

The national film participated in the 2008 of celebration is a movie that was released in the period March 1, 2007 to January 30, 2008. The time span that registration on December 11, 2007, to January 30, 2008. And the number of nominations received, of which 16 drama genre titles, 13 horror film titles, one children film title (Anak-Anak Borobudur) and the other of comedy film.

Radit dan Jani is a film with receiving of the most awards this year, with three awards. Other film Nagabonar Jadi 2, Quickie Express, and Mereka Bilang, Saya Monyet! compete behind with two awards each, while another film receiving one award each.

== Nominees and winners ==
=== Best ===
Winners are listed first and highlighted in boldface.

Best Actor	Best Actress
**Deddy Mizwar – Nagabonar Jadi 2**; Dwi Sasono – Mengejar Mas-Mas; Nicholas Saputra – 3 Hari Untuk Selamanya; Tora Sudiro – Otomatis Romantis; Vino G. Bastian – Radit dan Jani	**Dinna Olivia – Mengejar Mas-Mas**; Fahrani – Radit dan Jani; Nirina Zubir – Get Married; Poppy Sovia – Mengejar Mas-Mas; Shanty – The Photograph
Best Supporting Actor	Best Supporting Actress
**Tio Pakusadewo – Quickie Express**; Donny Alamsyah – Sang Dewi; Dwi Sasono – Otomatis Romantis; Jaja Mihardja – Get Married; Lukman Sardi – Nagabonar Jadi 2	**Henidar Amroe – Mereka Bilang, Saya Monyet!**; Ira Maya Sopha – Quickie Express; Meriam Bellina – Get Married; Nungki Kusumastuti – Radit dan Jani; Shanty – Maaf, Saya Menghamili Istri Anda
Best Newcomer Actor	Best Newcomer Actress
**Volland Humonggio** – **Sang Dewi**; Adadiri Tanpalang – Anak-Anak Borobudur; Marrio Merdhitia – Coklat Stroberi	**Titi Sjuman** – **Mereka Bilang, Saya Monyet!**; Sandra Dewi – Quickie Express; Sarah Sechan – Perempuan Punya Cerita; Susan Bachtiar – Perempuan Punya Cerita
Best Chemistry
**Vino G. Bastian and Fahrani – Radit dan Jani**; Dwi Sasono and Tora Sudiro – Otomatis Romantis; Henidar Amroe and Titi Sjuman – Mereka Bilang, Saya Monyet!; Shanty and Lim Kay Tong – The Photograph; Tio Pakusadewo and Rudy Wowor – Quickie Express

=== Favorite ===
Winners are listed first and highlighted in boldface.

Favorite Actor	Favorite Actress
**Vino G. Bastian – Radit dan Jani**; Deddy Mizwar – Nagabonar Jadi 2; Dwi Sasono – Mengejar Mas-Mas; Nicholas Saputra – 3 Hari Untuk Selamanya; Tora Sudiro – Otomatis Romantis	**Nirina Zubir – Get Married**; Dinna Olivia – Mengejar Mas-Mas; Fahrani – Radit dan Jani; Poppy Sovia – Mengejar Mas-Mas; Shanty – The Photograph
Favorite Chemistry	Favorite Soundtrack
**Vino G. Bastian and Fahrani – Radit dan Jani**; Dwi Sasono and Tora Sudiro – Otomatis Romantis; Henidar Amroe and Titi Sjuman – Mereka Bilang, Saya Monyet!; Shanty and Lim Kay Tong – The Photograph; Tio Pakusadewo and Rudy Wowor – Quickie Express	**"Selamanya Cinta" performed by D'Cinnamons – Cintapuccino**; "3 Hari Untuk Selamanya" performed by Float – 3 Hari Untuk Selamanya; "Butterfly" performed by Melly Goeslaw (featuring Andhika Pratama) – The Butterfly; "Disini Untukmu" performed by Ungu – Coklat Stroberi; "Pandangan Pertama" performed by Slank (featuring Nirina Zubir) – Get Married
Favorite Newcomer	Favorite Film
**Sandra Dewi** – **Quickie Express**; Adadiri Tanpalang – Anak-Anak Borobudur; Marrio Merdhitia – Coklat Stroberi; Sarah Sechan – Perempuan Punya Cerita; Susan Bachtiar – Perempuan Punya Cerita; Titi Sjuman – Mereka Bilang, Saya Monyet!; Volland Humonggio – Sang Dewi	**Nagabonar Jadi 2**; 3 Hari Untuk Selamanya; Coklat Stroberi; Get Married; Mengejar Mas-Mas; Mereka Bilang, Saya Monyet!; Otomatis Romantis; Perempuan Punya Cerita; Quickie Express; Radit dan Jani; The Photograph

== Film with most nominations and awards ==
=== Most nominations ===
The following film received most nominations:

Nominations	Film
8	Radit dan Jani
7	Mengejar Mas-Mas
7	Quickie Express
6	Otomatis Romantis
6	Get Married
6	Mereka Bilang, Saya Monyet!
5	The Photograph
5	Perempuan Punya Cerita
4	Nagabonar Jadi 2
4	3 Hari Untuk Selamanya
4	Coklat Stroberi
3	Sang Dewi
2	Anak-Anak Borobudur

=== Most wins ===
The following film received most nominations:

Awards	Film
3	Radit dan Jani
2	Nagabonar Jadi 2
2	Quickie Express
2	Mereka Bilang, Saya Monyet!
