= 2013 Indonesian Movie Awards =

Film industry award ceremony

7th Annual Indonesian Movie Awards
- Date: May 27, 2013
- Location: Studio 8 RCTI, West Jakarta
- Country: Indonesia
- Hosted by: Choky Sitohang; Tamara Geraldine

Television/radio coverage
- Network: RCTI

The 7th Annual Indonesian Movie Awards was held on May 27, 2013, at the Studio 8 RCTI, West Jakarta. The award show was hosted by Choky Sitohang and Tamara Geraldine. And the nominations have been announced for the category of Favorite, which will be chosen by the public via SMS. As for the category of Best, will be selected by a jury that has been appointed. As a guest star who will fill the event, among them Ahmad Dhani, Bebi Romeo, Rossa, Bunga Citra Lestari, 3Composer, and the participants of X Factor Indonesia.

Belenggu leads the nominations with nine nominations, with Rectoverso and Habibie & Ainun followed behind with eight and seven nominations each. In the night ceremonies, Rectoverso and Habibie & Ainun were biggest winner with receiving three awards trophies each. Followed behind by film Belenggu success taking home two awards.

Aminah Cendrakasih received a Lifetime Achievement Award, the first to be awarded by the Indonesian Movie Awards.

== Performers ==
| Artist(s) | Song(s) |
Main show
| Difa 'Idola Cilik' | "Marilah Kemari" |
| Choky Sitohang | "Galih & Ratna" |
| Chelsea 'Idola Cilik'; Bagas 'Idola Cilik' | "Jagoan" |
| Bunga Citra Lestari | "Cinta Sejati" |
| Ahmad Dhani; Bebi Romeo; Rossa | "Pupus" "Bukan Cinta Biasa" "Ayat-Ayat Cinta" |
| 3Composer | "Darah Muda" |
| Acha Septriasa; Tio Pakusadewo; Maudy Ayunda; Donny Damara | "My Heart" "Perahu Kertas" "Anak Jalanan" |
| Fatin Shidqia; Alex Rudiart; Shena Malsiana | "Ada Apa Dengan Cinta" "Laskar Pelangi" "Badai Pasti Berlalu" "Garuda Didadaku" |

== Presenters ==
- Joanna Alexandra, Kimberly Ryder and Maudy Ayunda – Presented Favorite Newcomer Actor
- Denny Sumargo and Igor Saykoji – Presented Best Newcomer Actor
- Coboy Junior – Presented Best Children Role
- Marcell Domits and Eriska Rein – Presented Favorite Newcomer Actress
- Asrul Dahlan and Olivia Jensen Lubis – Presented Best Newcomer Actress
- Reza Rahadian and Bunga Citra Lestari – Presented Best Supporting Actress
- Ayushita and Acha Septriasa – Presented Best Supporting Actor
- Raffi Ahmad and Laudya Cynthia Bella – Presented Best Chemistry
- Bebi Romeo, Rossa and Ahmad Dhani – Presented Favorite Soundtrack
- Henidar Amroe and Meriam Bellina – Presented Favorite Actor
- Adipati Koesmadji and Laura Basuki – Presented Favorite Actress
- Adinia Wirasti and Atiqah Hasiholan – Presented Best Actress
- Slamet Rahardjo and Donny Damara – Presented Best Actor
- Didi Petet – Presented Lifetime Achievement Award
- Eros Djarot and Ikranegara – Presented Favorite Film

== Nominees and winners ==
=== Best ===
Winners are listed first and highlighted in boldface.

| Best Actor | Best Actress |
|---|---|
| **Lukman Sardi – Rectoverso**; Abimana Aryasatya – Belenggu; Agus Kuncoro – Gending Sriwijaya; Reza Rahadian – Habibie & Ainun; Rio Dewanto – Modus Anomali | **Imelda Therinne – Belenggu**; Acha Septriasa – Test Pack; Bunga Citra Lestari – Habibie & Ainun; Laudya Cynthia Bella – Belenggu; Prisia Nasution – Rectoverso |
| Best Supporting Actor | Best Supporting Actress |
| **Ray Sahetapy – The Raid**; Butet Kertaradjasa – Soegija; Fuad Idris – Tanah Surga... Katanya; Verdi Solaiman – Belenggu; Yayan Ruhian – The Raid | **Dewi Irawan – Rectoverso**; Jajang C. Noer – Gending Sriwijaya; Meriam Bellina – Test Pack; Saira Jihan – Demi Ucok; Sitoresmi – Cinta Tapi Beda |
| Best Newcomer Actor | Best Newcomer Actress |
| **Petrus Bayleto – Atambua 39 °C**; Fauzan Smith – Perahu Kertas 2; Gudino Soares – Atambua 39 °C; Haffez Ali – Sanubari Jakarta; Natalius Chendana – 3 Sum | **Lina Marpaung – Demi Ucok**; Anisa Hertani – Soegija; Geraldine Sianturi – Demi Ucok; Gessata Stella – Sanubari Jakarta; Sharena – Perahu Kertas 2 |
| Best Chemistry | Special Award: Best Children Role |
| **Lukman Sardi and Dewi Irawan — Rectoverso**; Reza Rahadian and Acha Septriasa – Test Pack; Reza Rahadian and Bunga Citra Lestari – Habibie & Ainun; Iko Uwais and Donny Alamsyah – The Raid; Atiqah Hasiholan and Rio Dewanto – Hello Goodbye | **Simson Siwokay – Di Timur Matahari**; Aji Santosa – Tanah Surga... Katanya; Avrilla – Belenggu; Gina Salsabila – Sang Martir; Lana Nitibaskara – Ambilkan Bulan |

=== Favorite ===
Winners are listed first and highlighted in boldface.

| Favorite Actor | Favorite Actress |
|---|---|
| **Reza Rahadian – Habibie & Ainun**; Abimana Aryasatya – Belenggu; Agus Kuncoro – Gending Sriwijaya; Lukman Sardi – Rectoverso; Rio Dewanto – Modus Anomali | **Laudya Cynthia Bella – Belenggu**; Acha Septriasa – Test Pack; Bunga Citra Lestari – Habibie & Ainun; Imelda Therinne – Belenggu; Prisia Nasution – Rectoverso |
| Favorite Newcomer Actor | Favorite Newcomer Actress |
| **Natalius Chendana – 3 Sum**; Fauzan Smith – Perahu Kertas 2; Gudino Soares – Atambua 39 °C; Haffez Ali – Sanubari Jakarta; Petrus Bayleto – Atambua 39 °C | **Sharena – Perahu Kertas 2**; Anisa Hertani – Soegija; Geraldine Sianturi – Demi Ucok; Gessata Stella – Sanubari Jakarta; Gondut – Demi Ucok |
| Favorite Soundtrack | Favorite Film |
| **"Cinta Sejati" performed by Bunga Citra Lestari – Habibie & Ainun**; "Malaikat Juga Tahu" performed by Glenn Fredly – Rectoverso; "Belum Ada Judul" performed by Iwan Fals (featuring Laduni) – Mama Cake; "Perahu Kertas" performed by Maudy Ayunda – Perahu Kertas; "Bogor Biru" performed by Sore – Modus Anomali | **Habibie & Ainun**; Belenggu; Demi Ucok; Di Timur Matahari; Jakarta Hati; Modus Anomali; Rayya, Cahaya Diatas Cahaya; Rectoverso; Test Pack; The Raid |

Lifetime Achievement Award
**Aminah Cendrakasih**

== Film with most nominations and awards ==
=== Most nominations ===
The following film received most nominations:

| Nominations | Film |
|---|---|
| 9 | Belenggu |
| 8 | Rectoverso |
| 7 | Habibie & Ainun |
| 6 | Demi Ucok |
| 5 | Test Pack |
| 5 | Perahu Kertas |
| 4 | Atambua 39 °C |
| 4 | Modus Anomali |
| 4 | Perahu Kertas 2 |
| 4 | Sanubari Jakarta |
| 4 | The Raid |
| 3 | Gending Sriwijaya |
| 2 | 3 Sum |
| 2 | Di Timur Matahari |
| 2 | Tanah Surga... Katanya |

=== Most wins ===
The following film received most nominations:

| Awards | Film |
|---|---|
| 3 | Habibie & Ainun |
| 3 | Rectoverso |
| 2 | Belenggu |
