= Tika Bravani =

Indonesian actress

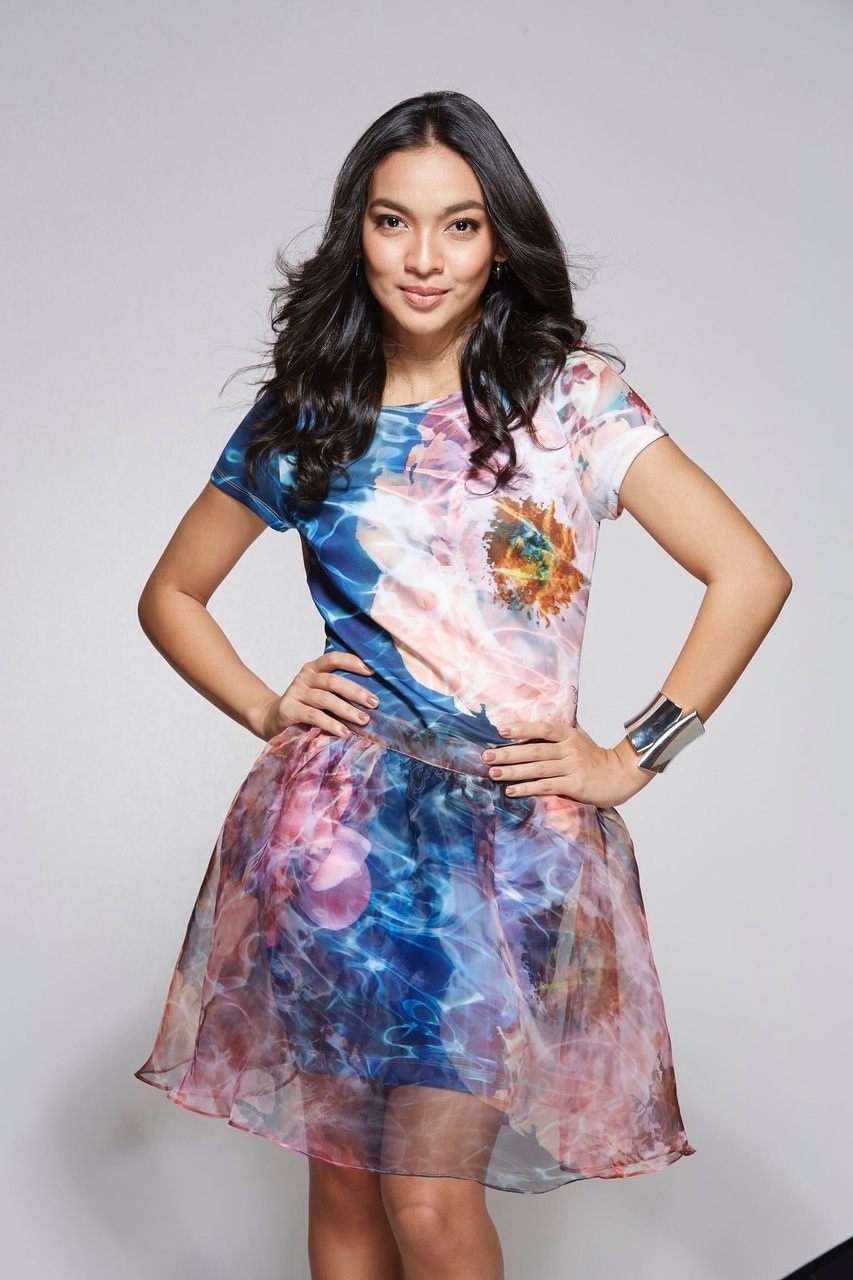
- Tika Bravani on Kartini Magazine in 2014
- Born: Ratu Tika Bravani; February 17, 1990 (age 36); Denpasar, Bali, Indonesia
- Education: University of Indonesia, (Bachelor's degree)
- Occupations: Celebrity, model
- Years active: 2003 - present
- Spouse: Dimas Aditya (2016 - present)
- Children: Kalam Mahandika Jusuf
- Parent(s): Tubagus Zubir Ramadhan (father); Kemalia Dewi (mother)
- Awards: Citra Award for Best Supporting Actress

Ratu Tika Bravani (born 17 February 1990) is an Indonesian model and actress of mixed Bantenese and Minangkabau descent.

== Biography ==
=== Early life ===
Ratu Tika Bravani was born in Denpasar, Bali from Bantenese father named Tubagus Zubir Ramadhan and Minangkabau mother named Kemalia Dewi. The Ratu first name is the Bantenese noble title which is pinned to the female descendants of the first sultan of Banten, Maulana Hasanuddin patrilineally derived from the father who has a first name Tubagus as noble title.

Since sixteen years old, Tika Bravani had parted ways with her father because her parents divorced and she chose to live with her mother, Kemalia Dewi. On 30 July 2014, Bravani's mother died at the fourth day of Eid al-Fitr after a long battle with cervical cancer. Before she died, Dewi told Bravani to get married soon.

=== Education ===
Although born in Bali, Tika Bravani spent her childhood in Jakarta. She was a graduate of SMP Labschool Kebayoran in 2005, after which she continued to SMA Negeri 70 Jakarta. Graduated from high school, she continued her studies in Accountancy majors Faculty of Economics, University of Indonesia. In 2013, Tika Bravani successfully completed her studies and earned her bachelor's degree in economics from the University of Indonesia with a GPA of 3.4.

=== Personal life ===
On 7 August 2016, Tika Bravani married Dimas Aditya, her co-star on the sitcom program titled Saya Terima Nikahnya on NET TV. Wedding reception held in Cilandak, South Jakarta with a mixture of Minangkabau and Bantenese culture which is packed with a touch of semi-modern and semi-formal shades. Based on the Minangkabau culture that embraced the matrilineal system, Dimas Aditya is given the title of Sutan Marajo of the Bravani family. A few months after marriage, Bravani suffered a miscarriage when she was three weeks pregnant.

== Filmography ==
=== Film ===
Year	Title	Role	Notes	Refs.
2010	How Funny (This Country Is)	Pipit		
2011	Make Money	Imelda		
2013	Soekarno	Fatmawati		
2015	Malaikat Kecil (Little Angel)	Siti		
2015	3: Alif Lam Mim	Gendis		
2015	Doea Tanda Cinta (Two Signs of Love)	Laras		
2015	Hijab	Tata		
2016	Bangkit (Get Up)	Teacher		
2016	Athirah	Ida		
2016	Catatan Dodol Calon Dokter (Dodol Notes of Doctor Candidate)	Evi Sungkar		
2016	Shy Shy Cat	Umi		
2017	Baracas: Barisan Anti Cinta Asmara (Baracas: Group of Anti Love Romance)	Sarah		
2017	Nyai Ahmad Dahlan	Nyai Ahmad Dahlan		
2017	5 Cowok Jagoan: Rise of the Zombies	Dewi		
2023	Khanzab	Nuning		

=== Sitcom ===
Year	Title	Role	Network	Refs.
2015	Saya Terima Nikahnya (I Accept the Marriage)	Kirana	NET TV	
2017	The East	Guest star	NET TV	

=== Soap opera ===
Year	Title	Role	Network	Refs.
2013	Bidadari-Bidadari Surga (Angels of heaven)	Laisa	SCTV	
2014	Santri Galau (Santri is Upset)	Nina	SCTV	
2016	Candra Kirana	Galuh	SCTV	
2017	Tukang Ojek Pengkolan	Denok	RCTI	

=== Television film ===
- Badik Titipan Ayah (2010) as Andi Tenri
- Carok (2010)
- Adik Bungsu (2011)
- Pahala Terindah (2011)
- Keluarga Kambing (2012)
- Maaf Lebaran ini Kami Tidak Pulang (2012)
- Antologi Hukum-Sengketa Lahan Hati (2013)
- Perempuan Simpanan (2014)
- Gali Lubang, Tutup Lubang, Masuk Lubang (2015)
- Cintaku Kembali Bersemi di Bali (2017) as Maura
- Kecantol Raja Minyak (2017) as Ira
- Prewed Loveaster (2017) as Resi

== Awards and nominations ==
Year	Nominated work	Award	Category	Result
2010	How Funny (This Country Is)	56th Indonesian Film Festival	Citra Award for Best Leading Actress	Nominated
2011	How Funny (This Country Is)	5th Indonesian Movie Actor Awards	Best Newcomer Actress	Nominated
2011	How Funny (This Country Is)	5th Indonesian Movie Actor Awards	Favorite Newcomer Actress	Nominated
2012	Pahala Terindah (The Most Beautiful Pahala)	57th Indonesian Film Festival	Vidia Award for Best Leading Actress	Won
2013	Keluarga Kambing (Family of Goats)	58th Indonesian Film Festival	Vidia Award for Best Leading Actress	Nominated
2014	Soekarno	8th Indonesian Movie Actor Awards	Best Supporting Actress	Nominated
2014	Soekarno	59th Indonesian Film Festival	Citra Award for Best Supporting Actress	Won
2014	Soekarno	3rd Maya Awards	Best Actress in a Supporting role	Nominated
2014	Bidadari-Bidadari Surga (Angels of heaven)	27th Bandung Film Festival	Praised Actress	Won
