= Mereka Bilang, Saya Monyet! =

2008 Indonesian film directed by Djenar Maesa Ayu

- Poster
- Directed by: Djenar Maesa Ayu
- Written by: Djenar Maesa Ayu; Indra Herlambang
- Based on: "Lintah"; "Melukis Jendela"
- Produced by: Djenar Maesa Ayu; Riyadh Assegat
- Starring: Titi Rajo Bintang; Henidar Amroe; Ray Sahetapi
- Cinematography: Roby Taswin
- Edited by: Wawan I. Wibowo; Arifin "Cuunk"
- Music by: Titi Rajo Bintang; Wong Aksan
- Distributed by: Intimasi Production
- Release date: 3 January 2008 (Indonesia)
- Running time: 83 minutes
- Country: Indonesia
- Language: Indonesian
- Budget: Rp 620 million

Mereka Bilang, Saya Monyet! (released internationally as They Say I'm a Monkey!) is a 2008 Indonesian film directed by Djenar Maesa Ayu. Starring Titi Rajo Bintang, Henidar Amroe, and Ray Sahetapi, it tells the life story of Adjeng, who was sexually abused as a child by her mother's boyfriend. Filmed over 18 days after several years of development, the film adapted two of Ayu's short stories from her debut anthology of the same name. Owing to its low budget of Rp 620 million, (Note: Then approximately $69,000.) its cast and crew were mostly amateurs and students, although several established actors appeared at reduced rates.

Mereka Bilang, Saya Monyet! has been described as "anti-Sjuman" because of the disparity between Ayu's more personal directing style and the social realism of her father, Sjumandjaja. Although commercially unsuccessful, the film was well received by critics. It won five national-level awards and was screened at several international film festivals. Two Indonesian publications, Tempo and The Jakarta Post, selected it as among the best films of 2008.

== Plot ==
Adjeng (Titi Rajo Bintang) lives alone in an apartment paid for by her boyfriend, a rich businessman (Joko Anwar). A writer of children's stories, she wishes to write short stories for adults; in this, she is mentored by Asmoro (Ray Sahetapy) – with whom she is also having sex. Meanwhile, Adjeng's mother (Henidar Amroe) handles various aspects of her life, constantly calling her and making surprise visits. This has led Adjeng's friends, Venny (Ayu Dewi) and Andien (Fairuz Faisal), to tease her about her overbearing mother.

When Adjeng goes clubbing with her friends, she drinks too much and vomits, later passing out in a toilet. As she lies with her head on the seat she recalls that, as a child (Nadya Romples), she had been forced to eat vegetables she had previously vomited. Later, when Andien uses her apartment for a one-night stand, Adjeng peeks and recalls how she had observed her mother having sex with her lover (Bucek Depp), a man who had previously molested Adjeng – an act which is not shown explicitly. This background, as well as her recollections of life as a teenager (played by Banyu Bening) at the home of her womanising father (August Melasz) are worked into Adjeng's short story "Lintah" ("Leech").

When Asmoro reads the story, he says that it is unrealistic and that readers need a climax. However, Adjeng insists that reality is unrealistic and that not all victims of rape are willing to call the police. Several days later, while they are lying in bed, Asmoro shows Adjeng that "Lintah" had been published in Kompas. Adjeng's mother, aware of the story's autobiographical nature, is furious and, after going to Adjeng's apartment, blames everything on Adjeng's father abandoning them.

Upset, Adjeng goes out with Venny and Andien, but when the two begin arguing about motherhood, Adjeng leaves them both in the street. She then goes to a café to have a drink with Asmoro, who comforts her. When she returns home, she checks her messages, most of which are about the short story. Meanwhile, Venny and Andien return to their families and reflect on the importance of children.

The following day, Asmoro sees the businessman, Adjeng's boyfriend, leaving her apartment, which puts him in a foul mood. He and Adjeng argue, and Asmoro almost smothers Adjeng with a pillow before declaring that they are through. As Adjeng lies on the bed, she recalls how her mother's lover raped her and how her mother murdered him. When the phone rings, Adjeng watches the people from her past going about their lives in a residential complex, smiles, and returns to writing.

== Cast ==
- Titi Rajo Bintang as Adjeng, a young writer who was abused as a child
- Banyu Bening as Adjeng as a teenager, while living at her father's house
- Nadya Rompies as Adjeng as a child, while living at her mother's house
- Henidar Amroe as Adjeng's mother, a former actress who is very controlling with her child
- Bucek Depp as Adjeng's mother's boyfriend, a musician who molests the young Adjeng
- Ray Sahetapy as Asmoro, Adjeng's mentor and lover
- Joko Anwar as a businessman, whom Adjeng dates to receive financial support
- August Melasz as Adjeng's father, a writer who enjoys womanising and interacts with his daughter
- Jajang C. Noer as Bi Inah, Adjeng's father's maid
- Ayu Dewi as Venny, Adjeng's friend who enjoys clubbing and wants to have a child
- Fairuz Faisal as Andien, Adjeng's friend who enjoys clubbing and has a child at home

== Production ==
The film was originally meant to be based on the short story "Mereka Bilang, Saya Monyet!" from Djenar Maesa Ayu's 2002 debut, a critically and commercially successful short story anthology of the same name. However, Djenar later chose to base the film on "Lintah" ("Leech") and "Melukis Jendela" ("Painting the Window"), two other stories from the anthology. Ayu had originally not intended to film her stories, but agreed after she was approached by a consortium who offered to fund her. She asked Indra Herlambang, a writer-cum-television personality, to help her write the screenplay as she "never could write stories with a plot", (Note: Original: "Ane juge tau kapsitas ane, biasenye ntu... kalo menulis kagak perneh bise pake plot.") and she needed him to keep her motivated. The two wrote the screenplay over a period of two years, having difficulty finding new investors after the original ones dropped out.

In 2004 Ayu began taking filmmaking classes to prepare herself to direct the film. She also watched several films directed by her father, the director Sjumandjaja, in preparation for production. Production began in October 2006, with some of the film crew – including art director Hardiyansah B. Yasin – drawn in after Ayu met them at a cafe in South Jakarta and discovered that they were active in the local indie film scene. The group helped collect the Rp 620 million (US$75,000) needed for production; as a cost-saving measure, numerous crew members were film students.

Many of the roles were written with specific actors in mind, with casting for other roles promoted by word of mouth. Titi Rajo Bintang, a lecturer at the Daya Kemang Institute of Art, was cast in the starring role of Adjeng after Ayu and her then-husband, Sri Aksana Sjuman (Ayu's brother), convinced her. At first she was uncomfortable with some of her scenes and her lack of training, as this was her first film role. However, she received support from her husband, who told her that she should act professionally and that "in a kissing scene ... [her] body should not reject it". The couple also provided the soundtrack for Mereka Bilang, Saya Monyet!, including three original songs – "When You Smile", "Someday", and "Love, Sadness & Happiness" – performed by Rajo Bintang.

Model turned actress Henidar Amroe was chosen to play Adjeng's mother; Ayu later said that the role had been written with her in mind. Although worried about the sexual content of the film, Amroe accepted the role, calling it a "crazy" plot that "read like a foreign movie". The young Adjeng was played by Ayu's daughter, Banyu Bening. Several of the established actors cast, including Jajang C. Noer, Ray Sahetapy, and August Melasz, agreed to appear in the film for less than their usual fee. Shooting took place over 18 days, although 14 had originally been allocated.

== Style and themes ==
Mereka Bilang, Saya Monyet! deals with the after effects of child molestation in a way that the Indonesian magazine Tempo describes as an "interesting time control experiment", (Note: Original: "... eksperimen permainan waktu yang menarik.") replete with flashbacks which clearly establish the time frame in which scenes happen. According to Wicaksono Adi, in his review for Kompas, Adjeng's writing is her therapy, as it entails constant reconstruction and deconstruction of her troubled past; he posits that this ultimately allows Adjeng to fight back against the authority figures who had troubled her since she was young. In a making-of documentary on the film, Ayu said that she had no moral message or social criticism in mind when creating the film, considering it instead a form of self-exploration. Admitting that the film could be read as a critique of violence against women and children, she said that she could empathise as a woman.

Adi also sees a love–hate relationship between Adjeng and her mother, which results in Adjeng's promiscuity – a common act in the Sastra Wangi literary movement of which Ayu is considered a part. The relationship between mother and daughter is reflective of themes in the earlier works Pasir Berbisik (Whispering Sands; 2001), by Nan Achnas, and Eliana, Eliana (2003), by Riri Riza. However, unlike the aforementioned films, Mereka Bilang, Saya Monyet! did not end with the daughter and mother on divergent paths. The reviewer Totot Indrarto, also writing for Kompas, wrote that Adjeng was the title "monkey" character of the film, being looked down upon by everyone around her; however, those who judge her do not actually know her, thus, in Indrarto's opinion, making them the "monkeys".

A review in Tempo described the film as "anti-Sjuman" owing to the differences in styles between father and daughter. Sjumandjaja's films tended to fall under social realism, while Ayu's debut had more of a personal, symbolic aspect with a touch of surrealism. The film does not show Adjeng's molestation, instead symbolizing it by showing a leech feeding; in one case, when Adjeng is raped in a bathtub, losing her virginity, the scene is represented by blood-red water and numerous leeches feeding.

== Release and reception ==
Mereka Bilang, Saya Monyet! received a wide release on 3 January 2008. Commercially unsuccessful in the country, the film was screened at several international film festivals, including the 2008 Singapore International Film Festival (SIFF), the 2008 Tallinn Black Nights Film Festival in Estonia, and the 2009 Asian Hot Shot Film Festival in Berlin. The film was released on DVD in Indonesia on 9 May 2008 by Jive! Collection, after passing through the censorship board in March. The DVD featured English-language subtitles, English- and Indonesian-language editions of the source short stories, and a behind-the-scenes documentary.

The film received generally positive reviews. Seno Joko Suyono, in a review for Tempo, stated that the clichéd plot of family crisis became more interesting with the introduction of sex; he also called the climax "sweet yet disturbing". (Note: Original: "... manis yang justru mengganggu.") Later in 2008 the magazine selected Mereka Bilang, Saya Monyet! as the best local movie of 2008, writing that Ayu had taken to directing like "a fish that had long floundered on the dry ground and was finally returned to the sea." (Note: Original: "... bak seekor ikan yang sudah lama menggelepar di daratan kering yang dicemplungkan ke dalam laut..") Iskandar Liem, writing for The Jakarta Post, also listed the film as among the top ten of the year, alongside international works such as Christopher Nolan's The Dark Knight and another Indonesian film, Riri Riza's Laskar Pelangi (The Rainbow Warriors). He described the film as "unflinching in its brutal honesty and fluid in its visual allegory", welcoming Ayu as "a rebellious new voice" in Indonesia's film industry.

Ening Nurjanah, an organiser of the women-themed film festival V, described Djenar as "an example of director who can portray a strong woman in her films", with the film "breaking new ground" in portraying women's sexuality. The Vietnamese-American actor Dustin Nguyen, who judged the film at SIFF, considered the film unexpected and "un-Indonesian", "well made, well acted, but [with] more of a Western sensibility. Lisabona Rahman, writing for Rolling Stone Indonesia, praised Rajo Bintang's acting and the film's portrayal of Adjeng's background, on which she wrote "the expression of [the background] is very powerful, keeping us speechless from fear"; (Note: Original: ";.. tuturannya yang sangat kuat terus membuat kita tergugu") however, she found the sound quality inadequate.

In his review for Kompas, Adi wrote that Ayu had made a well developed and acted film, a "good debut for [Indonesia's] future director", (Note: Original: "... debut yang bagus untuk sutradara masa depan kita.") although he considered the cinematography incapable of fully expressing the character's psychological torment. Indrarto described Mereka Bilang, Saya Monyet! as interesting despite technical flaws, containing a strong message that viewers should not judge someone or bother them when they are unlikely to know that person's true background.

== Awards ==
Mereka Bilang, Saya Monyet! was nominated for two Golden Screen Awards at the 2008 Indonesian Movie Awards. It also received six Citra Award nominations at the 2009 Indonesian Film Festival (IFF), winning three. Aria Kusumadewa's Identitas (Identity; 2009) bested Mereka Bilang, Saya Monyet! in Best Film and Best Director, while Joko Anwar's Pintu Terlarang (Forbidden Door; 2009) took Best Editing.

| Award | Year | Category | Recipient | Result |
|---|---|---|---|---|
| Indonesian Movie Awards | 2008 | Best Supporting Actress | Henidar Amroe | Won |
| Indonesian Movie Awards | 2008 | Best New Actress | Titi Rajo Bintang | Won |
| Indonesian Film Festival | 2009 | Best Film | | Nominated |
| Indonesian Film Festival | 2009 | Best Director | Djenar Maesa Ayu | Nominated |
| Indonesian Film Festival | 2009 | Best Screen Adaptation | Djenar Maesa Ayu and Indra Herlambang | Won |
| Indonesian Film Festival | 2009 | Best Editing | Wawan I Wibowo and Arifin Cuunk | Nominated |
| Indonesian Film Festival | 2009 | Best Leading Actress | Titi Rajo Bintang | Won |
| Indonesian Film Festival | 2009 | Best Supporting Actress | Henidar Amroe | Won |
