= Rachel Amanda =

Indonesian actress and singer (born 1995)

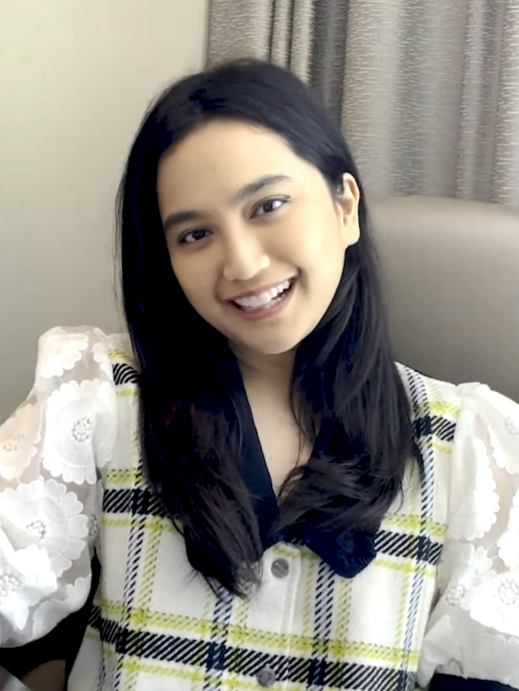
- Amanda in 2021
- Born: Rachel Amanda Aurora; 1 January 1995 (age 31); Jakarta, Indonesia
- Other name: Rachel Amanda
- Education: University of Indonesia
- Occupations: Actress, singer
- Years active: 2001–present

Rachel Amanda Aurora (born 1 January 1995), better known as Rachel Amanda, is an Indonesian actress and singer.

== Early life and education ==
Rachel Amanda graduated from SMAN 70 Jakarta. She is a Muslim.

Amanda graduated from University of Indonesia in 2018, majoring in psychology with a bachelor's degree. Initially, she majored in public health following her childhood dream of becoming a doctor. However, after four semesters, Amanda felt that public health studies did not match her preference and switched to psychology. She later started to publish a book titled Andai Kita compiled with two friends. In 2024, she graduated with Master of Communication Science at University of Amsterdam in the Netherlands, majoring in entertainment communication.

== Career ==
After her debut in the soap opera Candy, Rachel Amanda was given parts in other soap operas, such as Lia, Tersanjung 6, Nirmala, Papaku Keren-Keren, Pintu Hidayah, Soleha, Doa dan Karunia, and Indra Keenam. She starred in Heart (2005) and I Love You, Uncle... (2006) with Restu Sinaga, Ira Wibowo and Karenina. In the film, Amanda played Dion, a girl who loves a man much older than herself. She was nominated for Breakthrough Actor/Actress at the 2007 MTV Indonesia Movie Awards.

In 2009, Amanda appeared in the movie Kata Maaf Terakhir and did voice work in the film Paddle Pop Kombatei The Movie. She began appearing in the soap opera Kejora dan Bintang in 2009. In June 2009, Amanda collaborated with a religious singer, Opick, to sing "Maha Melihat".

== Personal life ==
On 12 November 2022, Rachel Amanda announced her marriage to a non-celebrity boyfriend who works as a businessman.

== Discography ==
=== Studio albums ===
- Amanda (2012)

=== Compilation albums ===
- Indonesia Menangis (Indonesia Cries) (2005)
- Bunga Kasih Sayang (Flower of Affection) (2006)
- Cinta Ramadan (Ramadan Love) (2008)

=== Single ===
Year	Title	Album	Label
2012	"Dipisahkan"	Amanda	In5piration Records

=== Guest singer ===
Year	Title	Other artist(s)	Album
2005	"Alhamdulillah"	Opick	Istighfar
2006	"Satu Rindu"	Opick	Semesta Bertasbih
2007	"Sedekah"	Opick	Ya Rahman
2008	"Hamba-Hamba Allah"	Opick	Cahaya Hati
2009	"Maha Melihat"	Opick	Di Bawah Langit-Mu

== Filmography ==
=== Film ===
Year	Title	Role	Notes
2006	Heart	Little Rachel (Ritoru Reicheru)	Supporting role
2006	I Love You, Om...	Dion	Lead role Nominated – 2007 MTV Indonesia Movie Awards for Breakthrough Actor/Actress
2009	Kata Maaf Terakhir	Lara (Rara)	Lead role Nominated – 2010 Indonesian Movie Awards for Best Children Role; Nominated – 2010 Indonesian Movie Awards for Best Chemistry (with Tio Pakusadewo); Nominated – 2010 Indonesian Movie Awards for Favorite Chemistry (with Tio Pakusadewo)
2015	Petualangan Singa Pemberani Maglika	Liona	Voice over
2017	Trinity the Nekad Traveler	Yasmin	Supporting role
2019	One Day We'll Talk About Today	Awan	Lead role
2022	Stealing Raden Saleh	Fella	Supporting role
2025	Comedy Buddy	Tawa	Lead role
2026	Sleep No More	Putri	

=== Television ===
Year	Title	Role	Notes	Network
2001–2003	Indra Keenam	Cherry	Supporting role	RCTI
2002	Sejuta Rasa Sayang		Supporting role	Indosiar
2003	Papaku Keren-Keren	Tasya	Supporting role	SCTV
2003–2004	Tersanjung 6	Dinda	Supporting role	Indosiar
2004	Nirmala	Nirmala	Lead role	RCTI
2006	Bunga Kasih Sayang		Supporting role	RCTI
2006	Rahasia Pelangi	Pelangi (young)	Supporting role	RCTI
2006	Maha Kasih 2			RCTI
2007	Soleha	Mia	Supporting role	RCTI
2007	Candy	Candy	Lead role	RCTI
2007	Ratu	Ratu	Supporting role	RCTI
2007	Pintu Hidayah			RCTI
2008	Namaku Mentari	Mentari (Muntari)	Lead role	RCTI
2008–2009	Lia	Lia (Ria)	Lead role	RCTI
2009	Embun	Embun	Lead role	Indosiar
2009–2010	Kejora dan Bintang	Bintang (Star)	Lead role	RCTI
2011	Putri Simelekete		Lead role	RCTI
2012	Si Miskin & Si Kaya	Aisyah	Lead role	MNCTV
2013	Legenda MD The Series		Lead role	MNCTV
2013	Juna Cinta Juni	Juni	Lead role	MNCTV
2014	Teddy Boy		Supporting role	MNCTV
