= Pondok Pak Cus =

Indonesian television soap opera

- Genre: Comedy
- Created by: Trans Media
- Starring: Mathias Muchus; Stefhanie Zamora Husen; Michelle Arthamevia; Selena Alesandra; Ariel Tatum
- Opening theme: Gaya Remaja by Anggun
- Ending theme: Gaya Remaja by Anggun
- Country of origin: Indonesia
- Original language: Indonesian

Production
- Producer: Atiek Nur Wahyuni
- Running time: 30 minutes

Original release
- Network: Trans TV
- Release: 14 December 2015 – May 20, 2016

Related
- Tetangga Masa Gitu?; Anak Menteng; Anak Jalanan; Tukang Ojek Pengkolan; Preman Pensiun Season 3; Go BMX Season 2

Pondok Pak Cus is a situation comedy soap opera that premiered on 14 December 2015 on Trans TV Indonesia .

== Cast ==
- Mathias Muchus as Mr. Cus
- Selena Alesandra as Citra
- Ariel Tatum as Cecile
- Stefhanie Zamora Husen as Caca
- Michelle Arthamevia as Shafa
- Sonny Septian as Roy
- Gandhi Fernando as Gandhi
- Riza Shahab as Adi
- Amel Carla as Mili
- Esa Sigit as Ivan
- Meisya Siregar as Tante Mona
- Faby Marcelia as Prilly
- Nabila Putri as Andin
- Ayu Dyah Pasha as Sarah
- Natalie Sarah as Bu Tami
- TJ as Bu Linda
- Veronica Felicia Kumala as Cici Panda
- Thessa Kaunang as Tessa
- Indra Bekti as Indra

== List of episodes ==
1. Again image Sensi
2. Acting Cecyl
3. Caca Hilang
4. Go Daddy, dijadiin House Party Sites
5. Kids Courier From Aunt Dona
6. Teachers Caca Ganteng
7. Already Crushed Ladder Fall
8. Sultry room, All So Restless
9. Maid Super Hygiene
10. From Robot Turun Ke Hati
11. Caca task Rezeki Imagery
12. Mantan Mantan Cecil
