= Demi Ucok =

- Poster film
- Directed by: Sammaria Simanjuntak
- Written by: Sammaria Simanjuntak
- Produced by: Sammaria Simanjuntak
- Starring: Geraldine Sianturi; Lina Marpaung (Mak Gondut); Saira Jihan; Sunny Soon
- Music by: Muhammad Betadikara
- Production companies: Kepompong Gendut; Royal Cinema Multimedia
- Release date: January 3, 2013
- Running time: 79 minutes
- Country: Indonesia
- Language: Indonesian

Demi Ucok is an Indonesian drama-comedy film released on January 3, 2013, written and directed by Sammaria Simanjuntak. The film is set against the cultural background of Batak, starring Geraldine Sianturi, Lina Marpaung, Saira Jihan and Sunny Soon.

The film received three nominations: "Best Film" at the 2012 Indonesian Film Festival, "Favorite Film" at the 2013 Indonesian Movie Awards, and "Movie of the Year" at the 2013 Yahoo! OMG Awards.

== Cast ==
- Geraldine Sianturi as Gloria Sinaga
- Lina Marpaung as Mak Gondut
- Saira Jihan as Niki
- Sunny Soon as Acun

== Awards and nominations ==
Year	Awards	Category	Recipients	Result
2012	Indonesian Film Festival	Best Film	Demi Ucok	Nominated
2012	Indonesian Film Festival	Best Director	Sammaria Simanjuntak	Nominated
2012	Indonesian Film Festival	Best Leading Actress	Geraldine Sianturi	Nominated
2012	Indonesian Film Festival	Best Supporting Actress	Lina Marpaung	Won
2012	Indonesian Film Festival	Best Scenario	Sammaria Simanjuntak	Nominated
2012	Indonesian Film Festival	Best Artistic Director	Rezki Ridha	Nominated
2012	Indonesian Film Festival	Best Sound System	Andri Yargana	Nominated
2012	Indonesian Film Festival	Best Original Story	Sammaria Simanjuntak	Nominated
2013	Indonesian Movie Awards	Best Supporting Actress	Saira Jihan	Nominated
2013	Indonesian Movie Awards	Best Newcomer Actress	Lina Marpaung	Won
2013	Indonesian Movie Awards	Best Newcomer Actress	Geraldine Sianturi	Nominated
2013	Indonesian Movie Awards	Favorite Newcomer Actress	Lina Marpaung	Nominated
2013	Indonesian Movie Awards	Favorite Newcomer Actress	Geraldine Sianturi	Nominated
2013	Indonesian Movie Awards	Favorite Film	Demi Ucok	Nominated
2013	Maya Awards	Best New Actress	Lina Marpaung	Won
2013	Maya Awards	Best New Actress	Geraldine Sianturi	Nominated
2013	Maya Awards	Best Original Screenplay	Sammaria Simanjuntak	Nominated
2013	Yahoo! OMG Awards	Movie of the Year	Demi Ucok	Nominated
