= Sharena =

- Born: Sharena Gunawan; Jakarta, Indonesia
- Occupations: Actress; model
- Years active: 2008 – present
- Notable work: Catatan Si Boy II; Perahu Kertas; Perahu Kertas 2
- Spouses: Taufiq Rizky (m. 2007–2010) Ryan Delon Situmeang (m. 2013)
- Children: 2

Sharena Gunawan (born 11 October 1983), also known as Sharena Delon, is an Indonesian actress. She is married to Ryan Delon. She won the 2013 Indonesian Movie Award for Favorite Newcomer Actress.

== Filmography ==
=== Film ===
Year	Title	Role	Notes
2008	Kick n'Love	Gita	Lead role
2011	Cewek Gokil	Dea	Supporting role
2012	Perahu Kertas	Siska	Supporting role
2012	Perahu Kertas 2	Siska	Supporting role
2013	Cinta Dalam Kardus	Laksmi	Supporting role

=== Television ===
Year	Title	Role	Notes	Network
2008–2009	Cucu Menantu	Rizka	Supporting role	SCTV
2009	Terlanjur Cinta	Siska	Supporting role	SCTV
2014	Baby, I Love You	Selena	Lead role	Indosiar

== Awards and nominations ==
Year	Awards	Category	Recipients	Results
2013	Indonesian Movie Awards	Best Newcomer Actress	Perahu Kertas 2	Nominated
2013	Indonesian Movie Awards	Favorite Newcomer Actress	Perahu Kertas 2	Won
