= 2010 Indonesian Movie Awards =

Film industry award ceremony

4th Annual Indonesian Movie Awards
- Date: May 7, 2010
- Location: JITEC Mangga Dua Square, North Jakarta
- Country: Indonesia
- Hosted by: Okky Lukman; Choky Sitohang

Television/radio coverage
- Network: RCTI

The 4th Annual Indonesian Movie Awards was held on May 7, 2010, at the JITEC Mangga Dua Square, North Jakarta. The award show was hosted by Okky Lukman and Choky Sitohang. And the nominations have been announced for the category of Favorite, which will be chosen by the public via SMS. As for the category of Best, will be selected by a jury that has been appointed. This time, there are 36 films which consists of 15 drama film, 11 comedy film, and other like horror, religion, and documentary film. And the number of awards up for grabs this time there are 15, respectively 8 Best and 7 Favorite.

With everything combined, Ketika Cinta Bertasbih and Jermal compete as the film with receiving the most nominations with nine each, and Queen Bee followed of receiving with seven nominations. Announcement of the winners will be held on May 5, 2010. On May 5, 2010, Ketika Cinta Bertasbih into a film that took home the most awards, with three awards, followed by Ketika Cinta Bertasbih 2, Jermal, and Serigala Terakhir taking home with two awards each. While other films get one award each.

== Nominees and winners ==
=== Best ===
Winners are listed first and highlighted in boldface.

Best Actor	Best Actress
**Tio Pakusadewo – Identitas**; Didi Petet – Jermal; Mamiek Prakoso – King; Mathias Muchus – Queen Bee; Oka Antara – Hari untuk Amanda	**Aty Cancer Zein – Emak Ingin Naik Haji**; Atiqah Hasiholan – Jamila dan Sang Presiden; Fanny Fabriana – Hari untuk Amanda; Leony Vitria Hartanti – Identitas; Tika Putri – Queen Bee
Best Supporting Actor	Best Supporting Actress
**Dwi Sasono – Wakil Rakyat**; Deddy Mizwar – Ketika Cinta Bertasbih 2; Oka Antara – Queen Bee; Verdi Solaiman – Ruma Maida; Yayu A.W. Unru – Jermal	**Niniek L. Karim – Ketika Cinta Bertasbih 2**; Ayu Pratiwi – Emak Ingin Naik Haji; Christine Hakim – Merantau; Fanny Fabriana – Serigala Terakhir; Meriam Bellina – Get Married
Best Newcomer Actor	Best Newcomer Actress
**Chairil A. Dalimunthe – Jermal**; Iko Uwais – Merantau; Kholidi Asadil Alam – Ketika Cinta Bertasbih; Nazril Irham – Sang Pemimpi; Yayan Ruhiyan – Merantau	**Oki Setiana Dewi – Ketika Cinta Bertasbih**; Meyda Sefira – Ketika Cinta Bertasbih; Olivia Lubis Jensen – Bukan Cinta Biasa; Rahmi Nurullina – Ketika Cinta Bertasbih
Best Chemistry	Special Award: Best Children Role
**Vino G. Bastian & Reza Pahlevi – Serigala Terakhir**; Didi Petet & Iqbal S. Manurung – Jermal; Oka Antara & Fanny Fabriana – Hari untuk Amanda; Tio Pakusadewo & Rachel Amanda – Kata Maaf Terakhir; Yama Carlos & Atiqah Hasiholan – Ruma Maida	**Iqbal S. Manurung – Jermal**; Aldo Tansani – Garuda di Dadaku; Rachel Amanda – Kata Maaf Terakhir; Emir Mahira – Garuda di Dadaku; Rangga Raditya – King

=== Favorite ===
Winners are listed first and highlighted in boldface.

Favorite Actor	Favorite Actress
**Oka Antara – Hari untuk Amanda**; Didi Petet – Jermal; Mamiek Prakoso – King; Mathias Muchus – Queen Bee; Tio Pakusadewo – Identitas	**Tika Putri – Queen Bee**; Atiqah Hasiholan – Jamila dan Sang Presiden; Aty Cancer Zein – Emak Ingin Naik Haji; Fanny Fabriana – Hari untuk Amanda; Leony Vitria Hartanti – Identitas
Favorite Newcomer Actor	Favorite Newcomer Actress
**Kholidi Asadil Alam - Ketika Cinta Bertasbih**; Chairil A. Dalimunthe - Jermal; Iko Uwais – Merantau; Nazril Irham - Sang Pemimpi; Yayan Ruhiyan - Merantau	**Oki Setiana Dewi – Ketika Cinta Bertasbih**; Meyda Sefira – Ketika Cinta Bertasbih; Olivia Lubis Jensen – Bukan Cinta Biasa; Rahmi Nurullina - Ketika Cinta Bertasbih
Favorite Chemistry	Favorite Soundtrack
**Vino G. Bastian and Reza Pahlevi – Serigala Terakhir**; Didi Petet and Iqbal S. Manurung – Jermal; Oka Antara and Fanny Fabriana – Hari untuk Amanda; Tio Pakusadewo and Rachel Amanda – Kata Maaf Terakhir; Yama Carlos and Atiqah Hasiholan – Ruma Maida	**"Sang Pemimpi" performed by Gigi – Sang Pemimpi**; "Bukan Cinta Biasa" performed by Afgan – Bukan Cinta Biasa; "Garuda di Dadaku" performed by Netral – Garuda di Dadaku; "Ketika Cinta Bertasbih" performed by Melly Goeslaw (featuring Amee) – Ketika Cinta Bertasbih; "Main Serong" performed by The Changcuters – The Tarix Jabrix 2
Favorite Film
**Ketika Cinta Bertasbih 2**; Emak Ingin Naik Haji; Garuda di Dadaku; Get Married 2; Identitas; Jamila dan Sang Presiden; Jermal; King; Ruma Maida; Sang Pemimpi

== Film with most nominations and awards ==
=== Most nominations ===
The following film received most nominations:

Nominations	Film
9	Jermal
9	Ketika Cinta Bertasbih
7	Queen Bee
6	Hari untuk Amanda
5	Identitas
5	Merantau
4	King
4	Emak Ingin Naik Haji
4	Sang Pemimpi
4	Garuda di Dadaku
3
3	Jamila dan Sang Presiden
3	Ketika Cinta Bertasbih 2
3	Kata Maaf Terakhir
3	Serigala Terakhir
3	Ruma Maida
3	Bukan Cinta Biasa

=== Most wins ===
The following film received most nominations:

Awards	Film
3	Ketika Cinta Bertasbih
2	Ketika Cinta Bertasbih 2
2	Jermal
2	Serigala Terakhir
