= Balas Dendam Istri yang Tak Dianggap =

- Genre: Melodrama; Revenge; Romance
- Created by: Agung Saputra
- Written by: Dharma Putra; Oka Aurora
- Directed by: Fajar Nugros
- Starring: Yasmin Napper; Giorgino Abraham; Arya Saloka; Alexandra Gottardo; Laura Theux; Ria Ricis; Dini Vitri; Windy Wulandari; Riyuka Bunga; Raffan Al Aryan
- Theme music composer: Benny Hadislani
- Opening theme: "Kekasih Yang Tak Dianggap" by Pinkan Mombo
- Composers: Izzal Peterson; Eliezer Supusepa
- Country of origin: Indonesia
- Original language: Indonesian
- No. of seasons: 1
- No. of episodes: 8

Production
- Executive producers: Jeff Han; Juan Xiang; Febriamy Hutapea
- Producer: Agung Saputra
- Camera setup: Multi-camera
- Production company: Leo Pictures

Original release
- Network: WeTV
- Release: 19 September – 8 November 2025

Balas Dendam Istri yang Tak Dianggap (English: Revenge of The Unwanted Wife) is an Indonesian revenge television series produced by Leo Pictures. It released on 19 September 2025 on WeTV. It stars Yasmin Napper, Giorgino Abraham, and Arya Saloka.

== Plot ==
Kinara, a smart and strong woman, heir to the throne of Indonesia's largest cosmetics company, married Andreas, a charming but manipulative man. Andreas not only cheated on her with his step-sister, Aluna, but also caused Kinara to lose everything: the family inheritance and business empire left to her father, also passed to her stepmother, Sandra. The most devastating blow came when Kinara lost her baby.

From the lowest point in her life, Kinara rose. With cold anger and sharp determination, she plotted a revenge that shook those who had destroyed her and uncovered dark family secrets. Along the way, Kinara found unexpected love in Dirga, a man who saw her strength beneath all her wounds.

== Cast ==
- Yasmin Napper as Kinara Pratama
- Giorgino Abraham as Andreas Wiryaatmaja
- Arya Saloka as dr. Dirga
- Laura Theux as Aluna Aulia
- Alexandra Gottardo sebagai Sandra Ayu
- Olivia Jensen as Miranda Adiningrat
- Ria Ricia as Karin Pratama
- Dayu Wijanto as Bu Anin
- Lukman Sardi as Bram Pratama
- Humaira Jahra as Elisa
- Dianda Sabrina as Meli
- Fajar Rezky as Tyo
- Reynold Surbakti as Robert
- Dini Vitri as Lani
- Farisa Yasmin as Rahayu
- Joseph Kara as Karna
- Windy Wulandari as Rati
- Hasninda Ramadhani as Jenny
- Riyuka Bunga as Rona
- Hessel Steven as Tomi
- Nadine Alexandra as Sarah
- Ence Bagus as Roy
- Robert Chaniago as Teza
- Raffan Al Aryan as Dika
- Aishwa Ayu Mustika as dr. Obygn
- Mira Desiana as Nia
- Ferry Pei Irawan as Pei
- Devri Nugraha as Abi
- Vania Valencia as Alin

== Production ==
=== Release ===
The official trailer of the series was released on 6 September 2025.

=== Casting ===
Giorgino Abraham were confirmed to play male lead, Andreas. Yasmin Napper has been offered the female lead, Kinara. Arya Saloka was reportedly cast dr. Dirga. Riyuka Bunga were reportedly confirmed to play Rona. In July 2025, Ria Ricis was signed to play Karin.
