= Donny Alamsyah =

Indonesian actor

- Born: December 7, 1978 (age 47); Jakarta, Indonesia
- Other name: Doni Alamsyah
- Occupations: Actor; martial artist
- Spouse: Putri Anggiareni (m. 2009)
- Children: 1

Donny Alamsyah or Donny Alamsyah Benjamin (born 7 December 1978) is an Indonesian actor and martial artist, best known internationally for his role in action films Merantau (2009) and The Raid (2011). He became well known in Indonesia for his appearance in the 2006 criminal drama film 9 Naga.

== Early life and martial arts ==
Donny was born in Jakarta on 7 December 1978. He had started practicing martial arts since he was a kid. His father, who is a pencak silat Cimande trainer, motivated 4-years-old Donny to learn martial arts. He later learned various martial arts to find something that would fit him. While he was an elementary schooler, he learned karate. In junior high school, he took up kung fu. During high school days, he learned Muay Thai, then continue to Wing Chun, wrestling, boxing, and aikido.

== Career ==
His acting career began when he starred the film Gie (2005), which is also played by Nicholas Saputra. In 2004, he often accompanied a friend who went to casting calls in Gie film. In the end, he was asked to join in the film and get a role in it. His second film, 9 Naga, essentially cemented his reputation as a promising actor. Since then, he has received many casting calls. He starred several action films that require him to compete, such as Merah Putih, Merantau, Darah Garuda and The Raid. He also starred in several music videos from Ungu, Ari Lasso, Andra and The BackBone and many others. He was nominated for Best Actor category in the 2008 Indonesian Film Festival for his role, as Bari (a writer) in Fiksi film, losing to Vino G. Bastian (Radit dan Jani).

== Personal life ==
He married Putri Anggiareni on 5 June 2009. The couple have one child.

== Filmography ==
=== Film ===
Year	Title	Role	Notes	Ref.
2005	Gie	Jaka		
2006	9 Naga (9 Dragons)	Donny		
2007	Sang Dewi (The Goddess)	Aliang		
2007	Kala (Time)	Henchman Leader		
2007	Selamanya (Forever)	Ipul		
2008	Fiksi. (Fiction.)	Bari		
2008	Takut: Faces of Fear	Andre	On Show Unit segment	
2008	Drupadi	Adipati Karna		
2009	Merantau (Wander)	Yayan		
2009	Merah Putih (Red [and] White)	Tomas	Merah Putih Trilogy	
2010	Minggu Pagi di Victoria Park (Sunday Morning in Victoria Park)	Vincent		
2010	Darah Garuda (Blood of Eagles)	Tomas	Merah Putih Trilogy	
2011	Hati Merdeka (Hearts of Freedom)	Tomas	Merah Putih Trilogy	
2011	The Raid	Andi		
2012	Negeri 5 Menara (Country of 5 Towers)	Ustadz Salman		
2012	Cinta di Saku Celana (Love in a Pants Pocket)	Ahmad		
2012	Cita-Citaku Setinggi Tanah (My Dreams is As High As the Ground)	Employee of Padang cuisine restaurant		
2013	Kisah 3 Titik (The Story of 3 Dots)	Anto		
2013	Get M4rried	Surgeon	Cameo role	
2014	The Raid 2	Andi		
2015	Di Balik 98 (Behind 98)	Second Lieutenant; Bagus		
2015	Comic 8: Casino Kings Part 1	Isa		
2015	Bulan di Atas Kuburan (Moon on the Cemetery)	Tigor		
2015	3 (Alif, Lam, Mim)	Bima		
2015	Skakmat (Checkmate)	Dito		
2016	Comic 8: Casino Kings Part 2	Isa		
2016	Iseng (Reckless)	Ludi		
2016	Pinky Promise			
2017	Promise			
2017	Night Bus	Haidar		
2017	KL Wangan	Wazi	Malaysian debut film	
2018	Insya Allah Sah 2	Gani		
2018	Buffalo Boys	Young Arana		
2019	Gundala	Fadli Aziz		
2019	Zharfa	Furqon Ali		
2019	Darah Daging	Salim		
2019	Kl Vampires	Agus		
2019	Rembulan Tenggelam di Wajahmu	Bang Plee		
2020	Pemburu di Manchester Biru	Hanif's Dad		
2021	V/H/S/94	Capt. Hassan	Segment "The Subject"	
2021	Ranah 3 Warna	Ustadz Salman Arya		
2022	Hayra: Dream, Hope and Reality	Fajar		
2022	Ghost Writer 2	Action Hero		
2023	Sosok Ketiga	Ustadz Doni		
2023	Galaksi	Gianjar		
2024	Indonesia Dari Timur			
2024	Sengkolo: Malam Satu Suro	Ibrahim		
2024	Tumbal Darah	Iwan		
2025	Perayaan Mati Rasa	Budiono		
2025	Qodrat 2	Sukardi		
2025	Godaan Setan yang Terkutuk	Ustadz Ahmad		
2025	Pencarian Terakhir	Tito		
2025	Panji Tengkorak	Panglima Wirabaya	Voice	
2025	Lebih dari Selamanya	Salim		
2025	Shutter	Tio		
2025	Pengin Hijrah	Dr. Herman		
2025	Badik			
2026	The Hostage's Hero	Colonel Taufiq		
2026	Never Surrender	Ulo		

=== Television ===
Year	Title	Role	Network	Notes	Ref.
2018	Heaven and Hell	Chris' direct higher-up	HOOQ		
2019–2020	Tunnel	Tigor	Goplay	6 episodes	
2021	Ustadz Milenial	Lukman		3 episodes	
2022	Serigala Terakhir	Margo		8 episodes	
2022	Keluarga Cemara: The Series	Aan	Disney+ Hotstar	6 episodes	
2023	Sejadah Panjang: Sujud Dalam Doa	Andhika		5 episodes	
2023	96 Jam	Hartono		4 episodes	
2024	Ellyas Pical	Nico Bassay	Prime Video		

== Awards and nominations ==
Year	Organisation	Award	Recipients	Result
2008	Indonesian Movie Awards	Best Supporting Actor	Sang Dewi	Nominated
2008	Indonesian Film Festival	Citra Award for Best Leading Actor	fiksi.	Nominated
2011	Indonesian Movie Awards	Best Supporting Actor	Minggu Pagi di Victoria Park	Nominated
2011	Indonesian Movie Awards	Favorite Supporting Actor	Minggu Pagi di Victoria Park	Won
2013	Indonesian Movie Awards	Best Chemistry (with Iko Uwais)	The Raid	Nominated
2015	Indonesian Movie Awards	Best Supporting Actor	The Raid 2	Nominated
