= Kejora dan Bintang =

Indonesian TV serial

- Created by: Leo Sutanto
- Directed by: Erlanda Gunawan
- Starring: Alyssa Soebandono; Rachel Amanda; Eva Anindhita; Baim Wong; Lucky Perdana; Cut Keke; Mieke Wijaya
- Opening theme: Rindu Setengah Mati by D'Masiv
- Ending theme: Rindu Setengah Mati by D'Masiv
- Country of origin: Indonesia
- Original language: Indonesian
- No. of episodes: 72

Production
- Producer: Leo Sutanto
- Production location: Jakarta
- Running time: 60 minutes
- Production company: SinemArt

Original release
- Network: RCTI
- Release: December 14, 2009 – February 28, 2010

Kejora dan Bintang (Kejora and Bintang) is an Indonesian TV serial that was aired on RCTI. It was produced video productions house public distributor company network by SinemArt directed by Erlanda Gunawan.

== Cast ==
- Alyssa Soebandono as Kejora Himawan
- Baim Wong as Erlangga
- Rachel Amanda as Bintang/Lia
- Lucky Perdana as Fitra
- Eva Anindita as Janet
- Bianca Liza as Magdalena Gautama
- Cut Keke as Hanifah
- Mieke Widjaja as Gautama Grandmother
- Mathias Muchus as Ryan
- Rio Reifan as Joel
- Mayang Yudittia as Lena
- Arhinza as Work Boss Erlangga
- Atiq Rachman as Donny
- Adipati Dolken as Anantha
- Salshabilla Adriani as Young Kejora
- Inggrid Kansil as Tika
- Dewi Affandi as Lila
- Rico Tampatty as Wijaya
- Lia Kartika as Lia/Kartika
- Ana Pinem as Minah
- Vonny Cornellya as Tiara Sukma
- Zora Vidyanata as Nia
- Donny Michael as Andre

== Synopsis ==
Kejora (Alyssa Soebandono) is a 19-year-old girl who has everything. She is pretty, cheerful, optimistic, and rich. She went to college in Japan. Mr Ryan (Mathias Muchus), her father, is a well-known businessman in Jakarta. Her mother has died. Kejora has a younger sister named Bintang (Amanda) (15 years) who has autism. However, Bintang is very good at playing the piano. Ryan is then remarried to Hanifa (Cut Keke), a widow with one child named Janet (Eva Anindita). One day, while Kejora is flying back to Jakarta, her suitcase gets switched up with Erlangga's (Baim Wong), the grandson of Gautama (Mieke Wijaya), a rich, yet a very stubborn and needy woman. What Kejora doesn't know is that Erlangga is in fact the boyfriend of Janet, her stepsister.

Mr. Ryan on the other hand is facing a huge financial crisis in his company. He always hides the fact that he is facing bankruptcy from his daughters. Secretly, Kejora has a boyfriend named Joel (Rio Reifan), who is very materialistic. Joel has a brother named Fitra (Lucky Perdana) who admires Kejora.

One day, when going to get a loan, Ryan was robbed. During the robbery, an accident happens and one of the robberies is killed on the fire. Ryan then gets an idea that if he pretended to be killed in this accident, his family will get a huge insurance settlement and be out of this financial crisis. He pretends to be killed. Kejora was devastated by the news. After Ryan's death, Kejora's relationship with Hanifa is becoming very tense. Until one day Hanifa throws Kejora and Bintang out of their father's house.
