= Khanzab =

- Poster
- Directed by: Anggy Umbara
- Written by: Dirmawan Hatta; Anggy Umbara; Riza Pahlevi; Vidya T. Ariestya
- Produced by: Dheeraj Kalwani
- Starring: Yasamin Jasem; Tika Bravani; Arswendy Bening Swara; Rizky Hanggono; Munggaran Meldrat
- Cinematography: Dicky R. Maland
- Edited by: Gita Miaji
- Music by: AL
- Production companies: Dee Company; Umbara Brothers Films
- Distributed by: MD Pictures; Prime Video
- Release date: 19 April 2023
- Running time: 105 minutes
- Country: Indonesia
- Language: Indonesian

Khanzab is a 2023 Indonesian horror film directed by Anggy Umbara and produced by Dheeraj Kalwani with the production company of Dee Company and Umbara Brothers Films. The film stars Yasamin Jasem, Tika Bravani and Arswendy Bening Swara in the lead roles.

== Synopsis ==
It tells the story of a woman named Rahayu. Her father was slandered in the tragedy of the massacre of a black magic shaman that occurred in Banyuwangi in May 1998. Rahayu felt unsafe and then decided to leave Banyuwangi. They moved to her hometown in Jetis, Yogyakarta. Unfortunately, even though they had moved house, their family was still terrorized and ostracized by the local residents because they were considered a family of a black magic shaman. Rahayu was initially able to understand the reactions and responses of the community. She also tried to be strong by praying for her heart to be lightened. Behind her loneliness, she began to feel strange things inside her. She became a person who had difficulty concentrating when praying. She also often forgot the number of rakaat she had done. Over time, Rahayu was known to be disturbed by a genie nicknamed Khanzab.

== Cast ==
- Tika Bravani as Nuning
- Yasamin Jasem as Rahayu
- Sheryl Drisanna as little Rahayu
- Arswendy Bening Swara as Sentot Wibisono
- Rizky Hanggono as Semadi
- Fuad Idris as Mbah Sarwo
- Vonny Anggraini as Mrs. Ajeng
- Badriyah Afiff as Riri
- Munggaran Meldrat as Ratman
- Sabian Liza as Ajik
- Satrya Jali as Mr. Kandar
- Yully Fidya as Mrs. Kandar
- Saad Afero as Wahid
- Afril Sabyan as Husni
- Ayu Inten as Mrs. Minah
- Irma Yunita as Mrs. Endang
- Yessy Kenyang as Mrs. Onah
- Sari Rahmawati as Mrs. Sum
- Kemal Al Giffari as Yanto

== Release ==
The film was released in Indonesian cinemas on 19 April 2023. It is released on OTT platform Prime Video on 24 August 2023.

== Reception ==
=== Critical response ===
Muhammad Wildan of Kincir rated the film 2 out of 5 stars. While he praised the "powerful and attention-grabbing" opening sequence and appreciated the film's premise addressing the real-life 1998 Banyuwangi ninja massacres, he felt the rest of the movie failed to maintain this momentum. Wildan criticized the narrative's poor pacing, repetitive scenes, and tedious jump scares. Furthermore, he noted that the titular entity, Khanzab, was relegated to a mere cameo with its origins, form, and exorcism methods left unexplained, while the historical tragedy was ultimately sidelined. Galih Dea of Cultura gave the film a 3 out of 5 rating, praising its relatability and social commentary regarding how individuals accused of practicing black magic are ostracized, using the 1998–2000 Javanese shaman massacres as a backdrop. Dea found the film effective as a horror piece, noting that its inclusion of gory elements distinguished it from other religious horror films that "play it safe," even though the scare tactics weakened towards the end. Technically, he lauded the musical score and the well-constructed 2000s urban set design, though he criticized the unrefined special effects for making the actors and backgrounds look disjointed.
