= Mer's Lips =

Bibir Mer
- Poster
- Directed by: Arifin C. Noer
- Written by: Arifin C. Noer
- Produced by: Jimmy Harianto
- Starring: Bella Esperance Lee; Tio Pakusadewo; Jajang C. Noer
- Cinematography: M Soleh Ruslani
- Edited by: Karsono Hadi
- Music by: Embie C Noer
- Production company: Cinta Nusa Bhakti Film
- Release date: 1991 (Indonesia)
- Running time: 95 minutes
- Country: Indonesia
- Language: Indonesian

Mer's Lips (Indonesian: Bibir Mer) is a 1992 Indonesian film directed by Arifin C. Noer. It was Indonesia's submission to the 65th Academy Awards for the Academy Award for Best Foreign Language Film, but was not accepted as a nominee.

== See also ==
- Cinema of Indonesia
- List of submissions to the 65th Academy Awards for Best Foreign Language Film
- List of Indonesian submissions for the Academy Award for Best Foreign Language Film
