= Sunday Morning in Victoria Park =

- Poster film
- Indonesian: Minggu Pagi di Victoria Park
- Directed by: Lola Amaria
- Written by: Titien Wattimena
- Produced by: Sabrang Mowo Damar Panuluh; Dewi Umaya Rachman
- Starring: Lola Amaria; Titi Sjuman; Donny Alamsyah; Donny Damara; Imelda Soraya; Permata Sari Harahap; Ella Hamid; Fitri Bagus; Aline Jusria; Kangen Band
- Cinematography: Yadi Sugandi
- Edited by: Aline Jusria
- Music by: Aksan Sjuman; Titi Sjuman
- Distributed by: Pic[k]lock Production
- Release date: 10 June 2010
- Running time: 100 minutes
- Country: Indonesia
- Languages: Indonesian; Cantonese

Sunday Morning in Victoria Park (Indonesian: Minggu Pagi di Victoria Park) is a 2010 Indonesian film directed by Lola Amaria. It was filmed in Hong Kong and Indonesia. The film was stars Lola Amaria, Titi Sjuman, Donny Alamsyah, and Donny Damara, and was released on 10 June 2010.

The film was nominated for Citra Award for Best Film at the 2010 Indonesian Film Festival, "Best Film Poster" at the 2011 Festival Film Bandung, and "Favorite Film" at the 2011 Indonesian Movie Awards.

== Cast ==
- Lola Amaria as Mayang
- Titi Sjuman as Sekar
- Donny Alamsyah as Vincent
- Donny Damara as Gandi
- Permata Sari Harahap as Yati
- Imelda Soraya as Sari
- Kangen Band as supporting band

== Awards and nominations ==
Year	Awards	Category	Recipients	Results
2010	Jakarta International Film Festival	Best Director	Lola Amaria	Won
2010	Indonesian Film Festival	Best Film	Minggu Pagi di Victoria Park	Nominated
2010	Indonesian Film Festival	Best Director	Lola Amaria	Nominated
2010	Indonesian Film Festival	Best Leading Actress	Titi Sjuman	Nominated
2010	Indonesian Film Festival	Best Supporting Actress	Ella Hamid	Nominated
2010	Indonesian Film Festival	FFI Award for Best Screenplay	Titien Wattimena	Nominated
2010	Indonesian Film Festival	Best Cinematography	Yadi Sugandi	Nominated
2010	Indonesian Film Festival	Best Editing	Aline Jusria	Won
2011	Festival Film Bandung	Best Female Leading Role	Lola Amaria	Nominated
2011	Festival Film Bandung	Best Female Supporting Role	Titi Sjuman	Won
2011	Festival Film Bandung	Best Screenwriter	Titien Wattimena	Nominated
2011	Festival Film Bandung	Best Editing	Aline Jusria	Nominated
2011	Festival Film Bandung	Best Camera System	Aline Jusria	Nominated
2011	Festival Film Bandung	Best Film Poster	Minggu Pagi di Victoria Park	Nominated
2011	Indonesian Movie Awards	Best Actress	Titi Sjuman	Won
2011	Indonesian Movie Awards	Best Supporting Actor	Donny Alamsyah	Nominated
2011	Indonesian Movie Awards	Best Supporting Actress	Imelda Soraya	Nominated
2011	Indonesian Movie Awards	Best Newcomer Actress	Fitri Bagus	Won
2011	Indonesian Movie Awards	Best Newcomer Actress	Ella Hamid	Nominated
2011	Indonesian Movie Awards	Favorite Actress	Titi Sjuman	Nominated
2011	Indonesian Movie Awards	Favorite Supporting Actor	Donny Alamsyah	Won
2011	Indonesian Movie Awards	Favorite Supporting Actress	Imelda Soraya	Nominated
2011	Indonesian Movie Awards	Favorite Newcomer Actress	Fitri Bagus	Nominated
2011	Indonesian Movie Awards	Favorite Newcomer Actress	Ella Hamid	Won
2011	Indonesian Movie Awards	Favorite Film	Minggu Pagi di Victoria Park	Nominated
