= Tukang Ojek Pengkolan =

Indonesian television comedy series

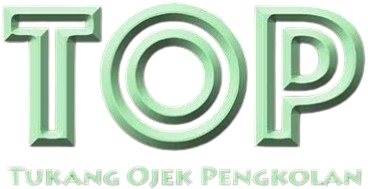
- Genre: Drama; Comedy
- Created by: Aris Nugraha
- Screenplay by: Ilma Fathnurfirda; Rizki Indra Sofa; Ayyash Syifa; Maly; Andriana; Hengki Kumayandi; Mutiara; Iyam Renzia; ANP
- Story by: ANP
- Directed by: Iip S Hanan; Violano Tenori; Harun Zein; Dodi Sanjaya; Acum; Dewo Dwipa; Dillon Tanjung; Lakamayus
- Starring: Andri Sulistiandri; Eza Yayang; Furry Setya Raharja; Ranty Purnamasari; Tengku Firmansyah; Cindy Fatika Sari; Adhe Nurul; Arya Saloka; Putri Anne; Fairuz Aliya; Fitri Ayu Maresa; Otong Lalo; Fahmi Bo; Febry Khey; Henry Chan; Johfi Syazeli; Nadya Ulya; Yudetra Atala Jinan; Sopyan Dado; Gito Gilas; Hami Diah; Anastasja Rina; Ahmad Satiri; Erwin Cortez; Silvia Anggraini; Yati Octavia; Piet Pagau; Indra Birowo; Andrew Andika; Fanny Fadillah; Ponco Buwono; Ivanka Suwandi; Pangky Suwito; Ega Olivia; Ali Zainal; Firmansyah Pitra; Davina Karamoy
- Theme music composer: Eza Yayang, Hades & Aloysius Aries Kuncoro Goelo
- Opening theme: Hey, Tukang Ojek! by Eza Yayang, Hades & Aloysius Aries Kuncoro Goelo
- Ending theme: Hey, Tukang Ojek! by Eza Yayang, Hades & Aloysius Aries Kuncoro Goelo
- Composers: Danny Supit; Joseph S. Djafar
- Country of origin: Indonesia
- Original language: Indonesian
- No. of seasons: 1
- No. of episodes: 3522

Production
- Producers: Didi Ardiansyah; Edward Chandra; Iwan S Manan; Reggi Djundjunan; Aris Nugraha
- Production locations: Jakarta, Indonesia
- Cinematography: Reza Arisakti; Donny Firdaus; Hari Cheme; Yaya Muzamil
- Editors: Giyono; Ci_One; Bustomi; Juhirwan; Y. Septianto; Dedy H; Uwah Penchoe; Maryono; Didi Setiawan; Antok; J. Utomo; Rusan; Geboy
- Camera setup: Multi camera
- Running time: 75 minutes
- Production company: MNC Pictures

Original release
- Network: RCTI
- Release: 25 April 2015 – 17 March 2023

Tukang Ojek Pengkolan is an Indonesian television comedy series that airs on RCTI. It premiered on 25 April 2015 and ranked as the longest running Indonesian television series as completing 3000 episodes in 2021. Produced by Aris Nugraha under MNC Pictures, it starring Andri Sulistiandri, Eza Yayang, and Furry Setya Raharja.

== Plot ==
In a village located in the Rawa Bebek area, behind the office buildings of Jakarta, resides a married couple named Rojak and Tati.

Rojak makes a living as a motorcycle taxi driver at the village entrance, working alongside two colleagues: Purnomo from Semarang and Sutisna from Sukabumi.

== Cast ==
- Eza Yayang as Rojak
- Andri Sulistiandri as Sutisna
- Furry Setya Raharja as Purnomo
- Fitri Ayu as Yuli
- Ranty Purnamasari as Maesaroh
- Adhe Nurul as Uyuy
- Erick Estrada as Nur Iman
- Fajar Gomez as Pandu
- Hamas Syahid as Ustad Fauzan
- Hami Diah as Jubaedah
- Anastasja Rina as Wahyuni
- Bogel Alkatiri as Indro
- Otong Lalo as Naim
- Engkar Nori as Iim
- Ni Made Monica as Monica
- Natasha Rizka Sakila as Nina
- Henry Chan as Bobby
- Sandi Maryana as Sandi
- Tanih Dugal as Bowo
- Ricky Baron as Bambang
- Eloy Maharani as Eloy
- Fairuz Aliya as Aliya
- Jonathan Alvaro as Roron
- Ahmad Januar Hardiyansyah as Anto
- Kusye Dbodors as Odih
- Fahmi Bo as Tajuddin/Dedi
- Febry Khey as Surti
- Johfi Syazeli as Faiz
- Nadya Ulya as Farhana
- Yudetra Atala Jinan as Fadil
- Retno Sutarto as Murni
- Sopyan Dado as Sopyan
- Ika Kartika as Rahmawati
- Arifah Lubai as Karina
- Clara Kaizer as Bunga
- Ega Olivia as Sasi
- Gito Gilas as Danang
- Diar Hendryan as Rahayu
- Arjuna Danis as Bagas
- Ahmad Satiri as Haji Sodik
- Cang Rusli as Kasman
- Key William as Rian
- Sandi Mochin as Teddy
- Pandu Bone as Ocit
- Tania as Widy
- Suparman as Haji Murod
- Tengku Firmansyah as Ferdi
- Cindy Fatika Sari as Amirah
- Nqaulia Aulia as Fanny
- Cahyary Nagara as Iwan
- Yando Adrian as Yanto
- Jhon Jawir as Sujono
- Andrie Tawaqal as Jumbo
- Eca Yasmin as Yanti
- Rifki as Eko
- Naquita Aurora as Melati
- Stella Bodea as Romna
- Ade Herman as Deden
- Ricky Perdana as Harun
- Kiki Kinanti as Serena
- Debby as Indah
- Nadhea Ananda as Raya
- Nikita Becker as Rizma
- Ana Riana as Rinjani
- Ranty Maria as Ririn
- Michelle Wanda as Rachel
- Pengky Jo as Pengky
- Tuti Hestuti as Tuti
- Arief Rivan as Ustad Urman
- Stefanus Ciprut as Cipto
- Pisca Maharani as Lastri
- Humam Muhana Pahnepi as Yudistira
- Tika Bravani as Denok
- Fitrie Rachmadhina as Tati
- Leydia Asterina as Farida
- Davina Karamoy as Gisel
- Shareefa Daanish as Auliani
- Ayya Renita as Sekar
- Ponco Buwono as Firman
- Lulu Kurnia as Sari
- Ivanka Suwandi as Umi Rozak
- Tengku Syaira Anataya as Anisa
- Adhista Pujiama as Windy
- Vanda Rainy as Windy
- Sonia Alyssa as Bonita
- Poppy Bunga as Popy
- Afifah Ifah'nda as Zahra
- Yasamin Jasem as Selly
- Mat Rozi as Salim
- Sarah Tüffahati Mornov as April
- Putri Anne as Novita
- Gaby Marissa as Munaroh
- Renita Sukardi as Nurmala
- Ucok Baba as Sarmili
- Dimas Aditya as Wildan
- Abenk Marco as Cecep
- Anyun Cadel as Anyun
- Andrew Andika as Reza Ramadhan
- James Purba as Beni
- Fanny Fadillah as Ucup
- Savira as Aisyah
- Titi Kamal as Tika
- Arya Saloka as Deni
- Ridwan Hendra as Daus
- Tabah Penemuan Siregar as Patar Siregar
- Tissa Biani as Dinda
- Jaja Mihardja as Simin
- Piet Pagau as Herman
- Indra Birowo as Ramli
- Lulu Zakaria as Hayati
- Indra Brotolaras as Ramdan
- Denny Firdaus as Murad
- Deden Bagaskara as Barka
- Dewi Octaviany as Laras
- Aldora Handoyo as Rani
- Enzy Storia as Sarah
- Pamela Bowie as Butet
- Ika Angel Hanika as Tiur
- Faradina Tika as Mimin
- Delisa Herlina as Mira
- Valeria Stahl Kaliey as Widya
- Rico Verald as Yadi
- Lian Rahman as Manto
- Shandy Ishabella as Siska
- Fajar Khuto as Ujang
- Yunita Siregar as Asri
- Arbani Yasiz as Beben
- Asep Sunarya as Udin
- Indrayana as Titin
- Roy Marten as Edy
- Dewi Natalia as Monica
- Iga Azwika as Wulan
- Shirin Safira as Maryam
- Sandi Tile as Amin
- Titiek Sandhora as Nova
- Yati Octavia as Yati
- Pangky Suwito as Pangky/Wito
- Irsyadillah as Ridwan
- Rheiny Octavia as Linda
- Tora Sudiro as Opik
- Echa Oemry as Maya
- Silvia Anggraini as Susan
- Firmansyah Pitra as Pipit
- Syahrudin Firdaos as Sapri
- Nayla Sandova as Husna
- Jerry as Jerry
- Kurnia Asmawati as Uun
- Melly Yan as Ayu
- Anton Qubro as Sugi
- Millenia as Olivia
- Obimesak as Wawang
- Shafa Afisah as Ambar
- Yuyun Shyfa as Nesti
- Tamee Irely as Vanessa
- Betran Rizki as Salman
- Moekti Halid as Aldo
- Imas Tamborin as Mumun
- Fenny Wijaya as Iyoh
- Evita as Chenchen
- Nabila Sudiro as Nana
- Sugeng Fadila as Makbul
- Dhony Fadli as Yusuf
- Aliyah Faizah as Lola
- Marchelinno as Raka
- Helene Sienca as Selvi
- Elsy Amalia as Ninu
- Syntia Fitriyani as Ani
- Aline Manza as Isaa
- Salshabilla Audita as Desi
- Nina Shaqi as Ratna
- Paulina Silitonga as Citra
- Indri Mohana as Inneke
- Indyrach as Hani
- Pangeran Tyson as Joni
- Acit as Cimot
- Selvy Kanesya as Rika
- Desi Oktari as Tini
- Prita Purnamasari as Prita
- Sendra Hestiningrum as Lisa
- Neni Monru as Nia
- Ryan Astrini as Gita
- Harry Al as Lukman
- Devicia Rossa as Bella
- Adzania Putri as Nia
- Fhadil Firdaus as Budi
- Camelia Putri as Indri
- Eldania Zahra as Mita
- Angga Kim as Andre
- Kanaya Abigail as Siwi
- Emmie Lemu as Jamilah
- Rahman Kholic as Ronron
- Puput Azzy as Kokom
- Melsy Delsini as Jelita
- Izhar Bima as Surya
- Fandico as Hans
- Amaris Pulungan as Keiko
- Vania Valencia as Ketty
- Ryda as Heni
- Matahari Yusuf as Al
- Nisrina Cesa Fauziyyah as Agnez
- Erwin Cortez as Erwin
- Regina Alya as Amy
- Gracella Angellyca as Gina
- Reihana Hanif as Puspa
- Yugo Avaero as Daniel
- Conchita Caroline as Andin
- Ardo Muller as Ipang/Ipank
- Annisa Fitrah as Sinta
- Richard Ivander as Boy
- Ira Ilva Sari as Feni/Veni
- Ali Zainal as Ali

== Productions ==
=== Casting ===
Eza Yayang was roped in to play Rojak. In April 2016, Dewi Octaviany was chosen to play Laras. In December 2017, Tika Bravani to play the role of Denok. In May 2018, Tora Sudiro's daughter named Nabila Sudiro enter the show as Nana. In October 2020, Tika Bravani playing Denok quit.

=== Filming ===
On 29 December 2017 the show completed 1,000 episodes. The show completed 2,000 episodes on 24 September 2019.

As of 25 December 2019, this series has surpassed the number of episodes Tukang Bubur Naik Haji with 2,185 episodes. So that this series ranks first on the list of soap operas with the longest episodes in the history of Indonesian television. On 26 November 2021, This series is the first Indonesian soap opera to reach 3,000 episodes.

== Reception ==
In the first episode, is in seventh place with TVR 2.9 and audience share 14.3%.

== In popular culture ==
The clip from an episode where the lead character Purnomo (Furry Setya Raharja) say "I love you Nov, I have to see you happy, even though you are happy with other people, not with me." went viral due to Putri Anne, who plays Novita, is known to be asked by her mother to marry Radit. Novita was forced to leave Purnomo in confusion.
