= Indonesian Movie Actors Awards =

Annual film industry awards in Indonesia

Indonesian Movie Actor Awards
- Current: 2020 Indonesian Movie Actor Awards
- Awarded for: Popularity in film
- Country: Indonesia
- Presented by: Indra Yudhistira R.
- First award: 2007
- Executive producer: Yul B. Androyono (2008–2014); Adam Sugriwo (2014–present)
- Website: rcti.tv/indonesianmovieawards

Television/radio coverage
- Network: RCTI
- Produced by: Akhmad Sef (2007–2010); John Fair Kaune (2007–2008); Tezzar Syamsudin (2010–present); Eri Sumaryadi (2011–2012); Emri Akbaril Syah (2014–present)

The Annual Indonesian Movie Actor Awards (formerly Indonesian Movie Awards) are annual awards that have been presented to filmmakers in Indonesia since 2007. The trophy given is called Piala Layar Emas. Winners in "Best" categories are selected by a jury, and winners in "Favorite" categories are selected by the public.

== Most nominated ==
Until now, 7 Hati 7 Cinta 7 Wanita is the only film that has been nominated more than 15 times, which is 16 times. Following behind is Arisan! 2 with 12 nominations and also there are four films with 11 nominations. Below are the films which has had a total number of nominations of 6 and above.

- Sixteen: 7 Hati 7 Cinta 7 Wanita
- Twelve: Arisan! 2
- Eleven: Berbagi Suami, 3 Hati Dua Dunia, Satu Cinta, Alangkah Lucunya (Negeri Ini), & Minggu Pagi di Victoria Park
- Ten: Laskar Pelangi, Perempuan Berkalung Sorban & Sang Penari
- Night: Mendadak Dangdut, Jermal, Ketika Cinta Bertasbih & Dua Garis Biru
- Eight: Radit dan Jani & Dilema
- Seven: Detik Terakhir, Mengejar Mas-Mas, Quickie Express, Queen Bee, Catatan (Harian) Si Boy & Pengejar Angin
- Six: D'Bijis, Janji Joni, Ruang, Tentang Dia, Get Married, Mereka Bilang, Saya Monyet!, Otomatis Romantis, Kawin Kontrak Lagi, Love, Hari Untuk Amanda, Lovely Man, & Tendangan dari Langit

== Most awards ==
The only film that received a total number of awards above five is Suddenly Dangdut. Here are the films that have received at least three awards (films are sorted by year of release and alphabetically).

- Six: Mendadak Dangdut
- Five: Laskar Pelangi, Perempuan Berkalung Sorban and Dua Garis Biru
- Four: 7 Hati 7 Cinta 7 Wanita and Minggu Pagi di Victoria Park
- Three: Radit dan Jani, Ketika Cinta Bertasbih, Dilema and Sang Penari

== Awards ceremony ==
Edition	Date	Favorite Film	Best		Favorite		Host	Venue
Edition	Date	Favorite Film	Actor	Actress	Actor	Actress	Host	Venue
1st	May 12, 2007	Denias, Senandung Di Atas Awan	Nicholas Saputra (Janji Joni)	Cornelia Agatha (Detik Terakhir)	Tora Sudiro (D'Bijis)	Nirina Zubir (Mirror)	Nirina Zubir, Luna Maya, Aming, Ringgo Agus Rahman	Tennis Indoor Senayan, Central Jakarta
2nd	March 28, 2008	Nagabonar Jadi 2	Deddy Mizwar (Nagabonar Jadi 2)	Dinna Olivia (Mengejar Mas-Mas)	Vino G. Bastian (Radit dan Jani)	Nirina Zubir (Get Married)	Nirina Zubir, Choky Sitohang, Wulan Guritno, Ringgo Agus Rahman	Plenary Hall, Jakarta Convention Center, Central Jakarta
3rd	May 15, 2009	Laskar Pelangi	Ikranegara (Laskar Pelangi)	Cut Mini (Laskar Pelangi)	Sophan Sophiaan (Love)	Revalina S. Temat (Perempuan Berkalung Sorban)	Raffi Ahmad, Ruben Onsu, Luna Maya	Tennis Indoor Senayan, Central Jakarta
4th	May 7, 2010	Ketika Cinta Bertasbih 2	Tio Pakusadewo (Identitas)	Aty Cancer Zein (Emak Ingin Naik Haji)	Oka Antara (Hari Untuk Amanda)	Tika Putri (Queen Bee)	Okky Lukman, Choky Sitohang	JITEC Mangga Dua Square, North Jakarta
5th	May 10, 2011	3 Hati Dua Dunia, Satu Cinta	Reza Rahadian (3 Hati Dua Dunia, Satu Cinta)	Titi Sjuman (Minggu Pagi di Victoria Park)	Vino G. Bastian (Satu Jam Saja)	Wulan Guritno (Demi Dewi)	Okky Lukman, Choky Sitohang	Tennis Indoor Senayan, Central Jakarta
6th	May 30, 2012	Garuda di Dadaku 2	Donny Damara (Lovely Man)	Raihaanun (Lovely Man)	Tio Pakusadewo (Dilema)	Wulan Guritno (Dilema)	Winky Wiryawan, Astrid Tiar	Tennis Indoor Senayan, Central Jakarta
7th	May 27, 2013	Habibie & Ainun	Lukman Sardi (Rectoverso)	Imelda Therinne (Belenggu)	Reza Rahadian (Habibie & Ainun)	Laudya Cynthia Bella (Belenggu)	Choky Sitohang, Tamara Geraldine	Studio 8 RCTI, West Jakarta
8th	May 14, 2014	Cinta/Mati	Joe Taslim (La Tahzan)	Ayushita (What They Don't Talk About When They Talk About Love)	Vino G. Bastian (Cinta/Mati)	Prisia Nasution (Sokola Rimba)	Lukman Sardi, Prisia Nasution	Studio 8 RCTI, West Jakarta
9th	May 18, 2015	Di Balik 98	Chicco Jerikho (Cahaya Dari Timur: Beta Maluku)		Marsha Timothy (Nada Untuk Asa)		Nirina Zubir, Ringgo Agus Rahman, Dennis Adhiswara	Balai Sarbini, South Jakarta
10th	May 30, 2016	Toba Dreams	Deddy Sutomo (Mencari Hilal)	Sha Ine Febriyanti (Nay)	Vino G. Bastian (Toba Dreams)	Julie Estelle (Surat dari Praha)	Daniel Mananta, Nirina Zubir	Studio 14 RCTI, West Jakarta
11th	May 18, 2017	Cek Toko Sebelah	Reza Rahadian (My Stupid Boss)		Cut Mini (Athirah)	Laudya Cynthia Bella (Aisyah: Biarkan Kami Bersaudara)	Daniel Mananta, Arie Untung	Plenary Hall INews Center, Central Jakarta
12th	4 Juli 2018	Dilan 1990	Teuku Rifnu Wikana (Night Bus)	Vino Bastian (Chrisye)	Marsha Timothy (Marlina: Si Pembunuh dalam Empat Babak)	Tatjana Saphira (Sweet 20)	Daniel Mananta, Nirina Zubir	MNC Studios, Central Jakarta
13th	14 Maret 2019	Koki-koki Cilik	Rano Karno (Si Doel The Movie)	Gading Marten (Love for Sale)	Nirina Zubir (Keluarga Cemara)	Luna Maya (Suzzanna: Bernapas dalam Kubur)	Daniel Mananta; Nirina Zubir	MNC Studios, Central Jakarta
14th	25 Juli 2020	Dua Garis Biru	Lukman Sardi (27 Steps of May)	Angga Aldi Yunanda (Dua Garis Biru)	Laura Basuki (Susi Susanti: Love All)	Adhisty Zara (Dua Garis Biru)	Daniel Mananta	MNC Studios, Central Jakarta
