= Alexandra Gottardo =

Indonesian actress and model (born 1985)

- Born: Alexandra Ria Farista Gottardo; 9 January 1985 (age 41); Malang, East Java, Indonesia
- Occupations: Celebrity, filmmaker, presenter
- Years active: 2003–present
- Spouse: Arief Utama Waworuntu (m. 2016; c 2019)
- Children: 1

Alexandra Gottardo (born 9 January 1985) is an Indonesian presenter, filmmaker and actress.

== Career ==
Alexandra Gottardo was born on 9 January 1985, in Malang, Indonesia, to Italian architect Carlo Gottardo and his Indonesian wife Banik Ekawati. Her father died when she was a child and she was brought up by her mother. After finishing her schooling, Alexandra Gottardo went to Jakarta for better career prospects. It was here that she was cast for TV serials such as Karena Cinta and Si Yoyo (2006). The latter show brought her recognition.

She made her film debut with Anak-Anak Borobudur (2007) and appeared in Suami-suami Takut Istri The Movie (2008). In 2010, she played the lead role in Ari Sihasale-directed drama Tanah Air Beta, set against the backdrop of the 1999 East Timorese crisis. Her performance as a widowed mother garnered her two nominations at the 2011 Indonesian Movie Awards. She also shared the 2011 Bandung Film Festival's Best Female Lead Award with Acha Septriasa (for Love Story) and won the Best Actress award at the Bali International Film Festival 2010.

She re-teamed with director Sihasale for the 2013 film Leher Angsa. The nest year, she played an important role in sinetron (soap opera) Catatan Hati Seorang Istri (CHSI). In 2016, she appeared in Pinky Promise, a film about breast cancer survivors and directed by Guntur Soehardjanto. She has been the brand ambassador for Earth Hour movement. She also has a wedding planning business in Bali and a dance school in South Jakarta.

== Personal life ==
During the night of 5 March 2012, two robbers broke into Alexandra Gottardo's house, and forced her at knife-point to withdraw a reported Rp 7.9 million from a nearby Bank Central Asia ATM. Both of the perpetrators were arrested later that same night. Following the incident, she hired two bodyguards. Gottardo married Arief Utama Waworuntu on 22 January 2016 in a Malang, East Java, and together they have a daughter, Charleteana Eleanore.

== Filmography ==
- Anak-Anak Borobudur (2007)
- Medley (2007)
- Suami-suami Takut Istri The Movie (2008)
- Tanah Air Beta (2010)
- Leher Angsa (2013)
- Pesantren Impian (2016)
- Pinky Promise (2016)
- Grisse (2018) as Harsha
