= 7 Hati 7 Cinta 7 Wanita =

- Directed by: Robby Ertanto
- Written by: Robby Ertanto
- Starring: Jajang C. Noer; Marcella Zalianty; Happy Salma; Olga Lydia; Intan Kieflie; Henky Solaiman
- Production company: Anak Negeri Film
- Release date: 18 May 2011 (Jakarta)
- Running time: 95 minutes
- Country: Indonesia
- Language: Indonesian

7 Hati 7 Cinta 7 Wanita (7 Hearts 7 Loves 7 Women, often abbreviated 7 Hati) is a 2011 Indonesian film. Written and directed by Robby Ertanto, it stars Jajang C. Noer, Marcella Zalianty, Happy Salma, Olga Lydia, Intan Kieflie, and Henky Solaiman. It follows the story of seven women connected through their obstetrician, Kartini. It was nominated for 6 awards at the 2010 Indonesian Film Festival as well as eight at the 2011 Indonesian Movie Awards, where it won two.

== Production ==
7 Hati was written by Robby Ertanto, a student at the Jakarta Art Institute, over a period of two years. After hearing that his mother was ill, he started filming "to give something special to [his] mother as a woman" He found his inspiration in the daily struggles of women. It was Ertanto's directorial debut.

Happy Salma was approached to play the role of Yanti, a prostitute. Salma accepted the role, on the condition that she not have any form of physical contact with the male performers. She later said that "it's okay to play a sensual character, but [she did not] want to do such scenes".

== Plot ==
7 Hati follows the story of seven women who are unknowingly interconnected. The lead character, Kartini (Jajang C. Noer), is a 45-year-old obstetrician who finds herself increasingly sympathetic with her patients. These patients include Ratna (Intan Kieflie), a hijab-wearing woman who is pregnant for the first time; Rara (Tamara Tyasmara), Ratna's 14-year-old sister; Yanti (Happy Salma), a prostitute; Lili (Olga Lydia), a pregnant Chinese Indonesian woman; and Lastri (Radia), an obese woman.

Each character has their own problems, which they confide to Kartini about. Ratna is overworked and has to support her family, without the help of her materialistic husband. Rara is worried that she may be pregnant after having sexual intercourse with her boyfriend. Yanti suffers from cervical cancer. Lili has been sexually abused by her husband, but thinks of it as an indication of his love. Lastri is newly married and trying to get pregnant. Kartini herself has had bad experiences in her former relationships, making her afraid of commitment.

== Themes ==
7 Hati is seen as a "take on women's issues", both societal and interpersonal, similar to Berbagi Suami.

== Release and reception ==
7 Hati was released on 18 May 2011 to critical acclaim.

The Jakarta Post called 7 Hati "A heart-warming drama staring [sic] an outstanding cast and offering a genuine reality check on Indonesian women". KapanLagi.com praised its visuals, music, scenario, and character development.

== Awards ==
7 Hati was nominated for 6 awards at the 2010 Indonesian Film Festival. It was also nominated for eight awards at the 2011 Indonesian Movie Awards, winning two; Happy Salma won Best Supporting Actress, while Rangga Djoned won Best Newcomer.
