= Titi Rajo Bintang =

Titi Radjo Padmaja
- Born: Titik Handayani Rajo Bintang; 10 February 1981 (age 45); Jakarta, Indonesia
- Other names: Titi Rajo Bintang, Titi Sjuman
- Citizenship: Indonesian
- Education: Farabi Music School
- Alma mater: Indonesian Daya Music Institute
- Occupations: Actress; Composer; Musician; Singer; Songwriter
- Years active: 2004–present
- Known for: Award Winning Composer & Professional Drummer
- Notable work: Mereka Bilang, Saya Monyet! Minggu Pagi di Victoria Park; Rayya, Cahaya di Atas Cahaya
- Spouse(s): Adrianto Djokosoetono (2016-); Sri Aksana Sjuman (2004–2013)
- Children: Children with Sri Aksana Sjuman: Miyake Keinaka; Children with Adrianto Djokosoetono: Bhaskara Deva Purnomo Djokosoetono
- Parent(s): Idham Rajo Bintang (father); Susi Aryani (mother)
- Relatives: Popi Mailani (sister); Suci Indah Sari (sister)
- Awards: 2 Citra Awards

Titi on a local podcast

Titik Handayani Rajo Bintang (born 10 February 1981), known professionally as Titi Radjo Padmaja (formerly Titi Sjuman), is an Indonesian award winning composer, drummer, singer, songwriter, and actress.

== Early life ==
Titi is the daughter of businessman Idham Rajo Bintang and Susi Aryani. Her father Idham was a hotel owner and entertainment businessman in Lake Maninjau area, as well as a show and entertainment entrepreneur in Jakarta. After completing her basic education in Maninjau, Agam, West Sumatra, Titi continued her secondary school in Padang . She then took a bachelor's degree at the Indonesian Daya Music Institute, Jakarta.

Titi is also the youngest sister of businesswoman and political activist Popi Mailani, as well as Model and Actress Suci Indah Sari (daughter-in-law to Indonesian Diplomat Nana Sutresna Sastradidjaja).

== Career ==
Titi is fond of sports and never wears skirts. In high school, she was supposed to study economics but she switched to drums because she wanted to do something "different". She furthered her drum studies at Farabi Music School and Daya Music Institute. It was here that Titi met Sri Aksan Sjuman, one of her instructor at Farabi who she later married then divorced. After graduation, she performed at the Java Jazz Festival; she also performed with artists such as Ruth Sahanaya.

Titi made her feature film debut in Djenar Maesa Ayu's 2007 film Mereka Bilang, Saya Monyet! (They Say I'm a Monkey!). She was initially contracted to provide a soundtrack for the film with her then husband, Sri Aksan Sjuman (also known as Wong Aksan), Maesa's brother. However, Maesa later asked her to take the lead role; after being cajoled by her husband and sister-in-law, Titi accepted. Aksan told her "in a kissing scene, when [she] kiss[es] a man, [her] body should not reject it".

In 2010, Titi starred in Minggu Pagi di Victoria Park (Sunday Morning in Victoria Park), a film about immigrant workers in Hong Kong. For her role, she met with immigrant laborers in Indonesia and Hong Kong to "get a deeper understanding" of the role. That same year, she and her husband provided the soundtrack to Tanah Air Beta (My Homeland). Although there were some scheduling conflicts, she was able to complete both.

In February 2011, Titi took her first role as an antagonist, appearing in Rindu Purnama (Longing for the Full Moon). She disliked the role as she disapproved of her character's actions. Later that year, she and her husband composed the score to Sang Penari (The Dancer), a film based on the Ronggeng Dukuh Paruk trilogy by Ahmad Tohari, over a period of a month and a half.

== Awards and recognition ==
Titi has won the first annual Extra Joss Awards in November 2000. Eight years later, she won two Indonesian Movie Awards for Best Actress: Her first was Best Newcomer for Mereka Bilang, Saya Monyet, while the second was for her role in Minggu Pagi di Victoria Park. Her role in Mereka Bilang, Saya Monyet! garnered her a Citra Award at the Indonesian Film Festival for Best Actress, while Titi and her husband at the time, Sri Aksan Sjuman, won a Citra Award for Best Soundtrack for the 2009 film King. She has said that receiving awards is a bonus which drives her to work harder.

Since her second marriage and birth of her second child, Titi seemed to have taken some time away from her career to focus on her family, despite this, during the 2021 Indonesian Film Festival, Titi was also nominated for Best Music Arranger through Rindu Purnama. Titi was also present at the Citra Awards Night of the 2023 Indonesian Film Festival at Ciputra Artpreneur, South Jakarta, where her presence was seen as support for her fellow film industry workers in addition to her participating in 2023 Indonesian Film Festival as a nominee reader for Best Music and Best Sound Designer.

== Personal life ==
Titi was married to fellow musician Sri Aksan Sjuman (formerly of Dewa 19) on Sunday, 15 August 2004, at the Al Azhar Mosque, Kebayoran Baru, South Jakarta. The application procession itself was held on New Year's Day 2004. She often collaborated with Aksan on writing film scores. The couple welcomed their daughter Miyake Shakuntala Sjuman, better known as Miyake Keinaka. Their marriage lasted for 9 years, but in the end, Titi filed for divorce from Aksan on 14 February 2013 and became officially divorced by 7 March 2013.

On 2016, Titi remarried to businessman Adrianto Djokosoetono, the only son of Purnomo Prawiro, and grandson of Mutiara Siti Fatimah, founder of the Indonesian taxi company, Blue Bird Group. Adrianto is the third generation of the Blue Bird Group, alongside his siblings and cousins. By 2020, Titi and Adrianto welcomed their son Bhaskara Deva Purnomo Djokosoertono.

Titi is the youngest sister of businesswoman and political activist Popi Mailani, and former Actress, model, and Singer Suci Indah Sari (daughter-in-law to Indonesian Diplomat, Ambassador Nana Sutresna Sastradidjaja). She is also the sister-in-law to Dr. Noni Sri Ayati Purnomo, a well-known philanthropist, President Director and CEO of Blue Bird Group Holding, and one of South-East Asia's most influential business leaders. Titi is also related to Indonesian celebrity Nikita Willy who is married to Indra Priawan Djokosoetono, her husband Adrianto's cousin.

== Inspirations ==
Titi enjoys the work of American composer John Williams, citing his works on Star Wars, Memoirs of a Geisha, and Home Alone as some of her favourites.

== Filmography ==
Year	Title	Credited as		Role	Notes/Ref.
Year	Title	Actor	Composer	Role	Notes/Ref.
2004	17th	Yes	No	Sulastri	
2007	The Photograph	No	Yes	—N/a	
2008	The Storyteller	Yes	Yes	—N/a	Short Film
2008	Mereka Bilang, Saya Monyet!	Yes	Yes	Adjeng	
2008	Laskar Pelangi	No	Yes	—N/a	
2009	Identitas	Yes	No	Regent Candidate's Success Team	
2009	Garuda di Dadaku	No	Yes	—N/a	
2009	King	No	Yes	—N/a	
2009	Sang Pemimpi	No	Yes	—N/a	
2010	Minggu Pagi di Victoria Park	Yes	Yes	Sekar	
2010	Tanah Air Beta	No	Yes	—N/a	
2010	Dalam Mihrab Cinta	No	Yes	—N/a	
2010	Nyanyian Para Pejuang Sunyi	Yes	No	—N/a	Short Film
2011	Khalifah	Yes	No	Fatimah	
2011	Rindu Purnama	Yes	Yes	Monik	
2011	Serdadu Kumbang	Yes	Yes	Siti	
2011	Sang Penari	No	Yes	—N/a	
2012	Rayya, Cahaya Diatas Cahaya	Yes	Yes	Rayya	
2013	Mursala	Yes	No	Taruli Sinaga	
2014	12 Menit	Yes	No	Rene	
2016	The Window	Yes	No	Dewi	

== Television ==
Year	Title	Role	Notes	Ref.
2009	Jakarta International Jazz Festival (2009)	Participant	—N/a	
2010	Jakarta International Jazz Festival (2010)	Participant	—N/a	
2010	Indonesia Mencari Bakat	Jury	(season 1–2) Judge	
2011	Indonesia Mencari Bakat	Jury	(season 1–2) Judge	
2012	Indonesia Mencari Bakat	Jury	(season 3–4) Chief Judge	
2013	Indonesia Mencari Bakat	Jury	(season 3–4) Chief Judge	
2014	Indonesia Mencari Bakat	Jury	(season 3–4) Chief Judge	
2015	Celebrity Lipsync Combat	Panelist	—N/a	
2015–16	Celebrity Lipsync Battle Indonesia	Panelist	—N/a	
2015–16	The Remix	Jury	(season 1) Guest Judge	
2015–16	The Remix	Jury	(season 2) Chief Judge	
2021	Indonesia Mencari Bakat	Jury	(season 5) Guest Judge	

=== TV commercials ===
Year	Commercials
2000	Extra Joss
2000	JVC
2001	Oskadon
2004	Extra Joss
2006	Extra Joss
2006	Extra Joss
2006	Frisian Flag/Dutch Lady
2011	Dove
2011	You-C 1000

== Music ==
=== Singles ===
Year	Song Title	Album	Credit As			Artist
Year	Song Title	Album	Songwriter	Singer	Actress	Artist
2009	Jujur Aku Tak Sanggup	Kembali	No	No	Yes	Pasto-1
2011	Just The Way You Are	Just The Way You Are	No	Yes	Yes	Titi Radjo Padmaja
2021	Leave and Goodbye	Leave and Goodbye	Yes	Yes	Yes	Titi Radjo Padmaja
2021	Leave and Goodbye (Remix)	Leave and Goodbye	Yes	Yes	Yes	Titi Radjo Padmaja ft. Jevin Julian
2021	Leave and Goodbye (Acappella)	Leave and Goodbye	Yes	Yes	Yes	Titi Radjo Padmaja
2022	Flow	Flow	Yes	Yes	Yes	Titi Radjo Padmaja
2023	Rindu	Rindu	Yes	Yes	Yes	Titi Radjo Padmaja

=== Film Soundtracks ===
Year	Soundtrack	Role
2007	The Photograph	Soundtrack Composer
2008	Laskar Pelangi	Soundtrack Composer
2010	Tanah Air Beta	Soundtrack Composer
2010	King	Soundtrack Composer
2011	Sang Penari	Soundtrack Composer

== Awards and nominations ==
Year	Award	Category	Nominated work	Result
2008	Indonesian Movie Actor Awards	Best New Actress	Mereka Bilang, Saya Monyet!	Won
2008	Indonesian Movie Actor Awards	Favourite Newcomer	Mereka Bilang, Saya Monyet!	Won
2008	Indonesian Film Critics Society	Best Breakthrough Actress	Mereka Bilang, Saya Monyet!	Won
2009	Indonesian Film Festival	Citra Award for Best Leading Actress	Mereka Bilang, Saya Monyet!	Won
2009	Indonesian Film Festival	Citra Award for Best Original Score (with Aksan Sjuman)	Garuda di Dadaku	Nominated
2009	Indonesian Film Festival	Citra Award for Best Original Score (with Aksan Sjuman)	King	Won
2010	Bandung Film Festival	Best Musical Arranger	Sang Pemimpi	Won
2010	Indonesian Film Festival	Citra Award for Best Leading Actress	Minggu Pagi di Victoria Park	Nominated
2011	Bandung Film Festival	Best Musical Arranger	Tanah Air Beta	Nominated
2011	Bandung Film Festival	Best Supporting Actress	Minggu Pagi di Victoria Park	Won
2011	Indonesian Movie Awards	Best Female Lead	Minggu Pagi di Victoria Park	Won
2011	Indonesian Movie Awards	Favourite Female Lead	Minggu Pagi di Victoria Park	Nominated
2011	Indonesian Film Festival	Citra Award for Best Original Score (with Aksan Sjuman)	Rindu Purnama	Nominated
2013	ASEAN International Film Festival and Awards	Best Actress	Rayya, Cahaya di Atas Cahaya	Nominated

== Related figures ==
- Bambang Pamungkas (soccer)
- Chris John (boxing)
- Denny Sumargo (basketball)
- Joe Taslim (judo)
- Eko Yuli Irawan (weightlifting)
- Wewey Wita (Pencak Silat)
- Diananda Choirunissa (archery)

Awards and achievements
Preceded by –	Extra Joss Awards (First Annual) (2000)	Succeeded by Ahmad Dhani (2001)

Awards and achievements
Preceded by Fahrani (Radit dan Jani) (2008)	Best Leading Actress (Citra Award) (Mereka Bilang, Saya Monyet!) (2009)	Succeeded by Laura Basuki (3 Hati 2 Dunia, Satu Cinta) (2010)
