= Tamara Geraldine =

Indonesian presenter and author

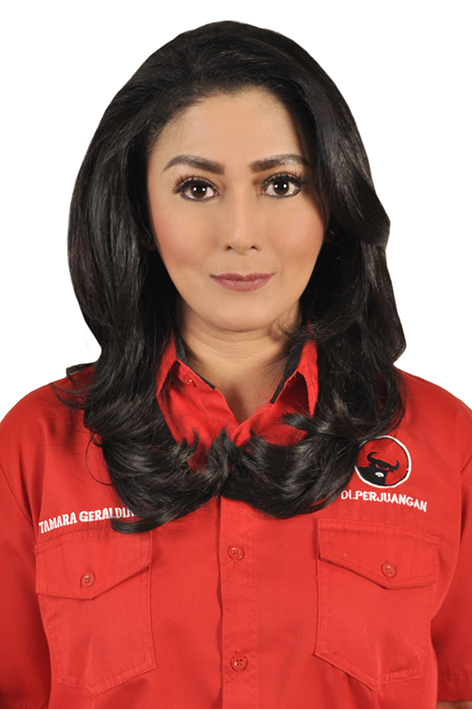
- Born: Maria Geraldine Tambunan; May 21, 1974 (age 51); Jakarta, Indonesia
- Occupations: Presenter; author
- Spouse: Tien Thinh Pham (m. 2000–2011)
- Children: 1

Maria Geraldine Tambunan, known as Tamara Geraldine (born May 21, 1974), is an Indonesian presenter and author. She has released two books: Kamu Sadar, Saya Punya Alasan Untuk Selingkuh kan, Sayang? and Yuni Shara – 35 Cangkir Kopi.

== Career ==
As a presenter, Tambunan has hosted many TV shows, including sports events. She has hosted the broadcast of the FIFA World Cup for several years. She hosted a gossip show called the Go Show on MNCTV.

She was awarded "Best Female Sport Presenter" for Panasonic Awards six consecutive years (1999 to 2004).

Her career as a writer started from her habit of writing a diary. Her short stories were published in book form. Her first book, entitled Kamu Sadar, Saya Punya Alasan Untuk Selingkuh kan, Sayang?, contains a collection of 12 short stories. With photographer Darwis Triadi, she wrote a biography of her friend, Yuni Shara – 35 Cangkir Kopi.

== Personal life ==
Tamara was married to a businessman from Vietnam, Tien Thinh Pham. They have one child.

== Television ==
Year	Title	Role	Notes	Network
1999	Boom Basket	Herself	Presenter	RCTI
2001	Go Show	Herself	Presenter	TPI
2002–2006	Game Zone	Herself	Presenter	TPI
2004	Malam Pertama 2	Tami	Lead role	SCTV
2005	Ari Wibowo Mencari Pembantu	Herself	Presenter	SCTV
2006	Pernik	Herself	Presenter	TV7
2014	Misteri Ilahi	Herself	Presenter	ANTV
2014	Kontraktor dan Jurangan Beras	Herself	Presenter	O Channel
2015	Akibat Salah Kamar	Herself	Presenter	ANTV

== Book ==
Year	Title
2003	Kamu Sadar, Saya Punya Alasan Untuk Selingkuh kan, Sayang?
2016	Tiga Kali Sepuluh (The Unheard Song) Ruth Sahanaya
2007	Yuni Shara, 35 Cangkir Kopi
