= 3 Hati Dua Dunia, Satu Cinta =

3 Hati Dua Dunia Satu Cinta
- Film poster
- Directed by: Benni Setiawan
- Written by: Benni Setiawan
- Produced by: Putut Widjanarko
- Starring: Reza Rahadian; Laura Basuki; Arumi Bachsin; Henidar Amroe; Rasyid Karim; Robby Tumewu; Ira Wibowo; Zainal Abidin Domba; Jay Wijayanto; M Assegaf Hadad Alwi; Ira Svira
- Cinematography: Roy Lolang
- Production company: Mizan Productions
- Release date: July 1, 2010
- Running time: 108 minutes
- Country: Indonesia
- Language: Indonesian

3 Hati Dua Dunia Satu Cinta is a 2010 Indonesian drama film directed by Benni Setiawan. The film won seven awards at the Indonesian Film Festival in 2011, including Best Film. The film is adapted from two novels by Ben Sohib (Da Peci Code and Rosid dan Delia). The film deals with how a young Muslim man, Roshid (Reza Rahardian) and a Catholic girl (Laura Basuki) are able to deal with religious differences.

== Accolades ==
Award	Year	Category	Recipient	Result
Bandung Film Festival	2011	Best Supporting Actor	Rasyid Karim	Won
Bandung Film Festival	2011	Best Film	Putut Widjanarko	Nominated
Bandung Film Festival	2011	Best Lead Actor	Reza Rahadian	Nominated
Bandung Film Festival	2011	Best Lead Actress	Laura Basuki	Nominated
Bandung Film Festival	2011	Best Director	Benni Setiawan	Nominated
Bandung Film Festival	2011	Best Writer	Benni Setiawan	Nominated
Bandung Film Festival	2011	Best Editor	Cesa David Luckmansyah	Nominated
Bandung Film Festival	2011	Best Cinematography	Roy Lolang	Nominated
Bandung Film Festival	2011	Best Movie Poster		Nominated
Indonesian Movie Awards	2011	Best Lead Actor	Reza Rahardian	Won
Indonesian Movie Awards	2011	Favorite Movies		Won
Indonesian Film Festival	2010	Best Supporting Actor	Rasyid Karim	Won
Indonesian Film Festival	2010	Best Art Direction	Oscart Firdaus	Won
Indonesian Film Festival	2010	Best Adapted Screenplay	Benni Setiawan	Won
Indonesian Film Festival	2010	Best Director	Benni Setiawan	Won
Indonesian Film Festival	2010	Best Lead Actress	Laura Basuki	Won
Indonesian Film Festival	2010	Best Lead Actor	Reza Rahadian	Won
Indonesian Film Festival	2010	Best Film	Putut Widjanarko	Won
Indonesian Film Festival	2010	Best Supporting Actress	Henidar Amroe	Nominated
Indonesian Film Festival	2010	Best Cinematography	Roy Lolang	Nominated
Indonesian Film Festival	2010	Best Sound Editing & Mixing	Handi Ilfat, Satrio Budiono	Nominated
Indonesian Film Festival	2010	Best Original Score	Thoersi Argeswara	Nominated
