= How Funny (This Country Is) =

2010 Indonesian comedy film

- Film poster
- Directed by: Deddy Mizwar
- Written by: Musfar Yasin
- Produced by: Zairin Zain
- Starring: Reza Rahadian
- Cinematography: Yudi Datau
- Edited by: Tito Kurnianto
- Music by: Thoersi Ageswara
- Release date: 15 April 2010
- Running time: 105 minutes
- Country: Indonesia
- Language: Indonesian

How Funny (This Country Is) (Indonesian: Alangkah Lucunya (Negeri Ini)) is a 2010 Indonesian comedy film directed by Deddy Mizwar, starring Reza Rahadian, Asrul Dahlan, and Tika Bravani. It tells the story of 3 graduates who attempt to educate a group of young pickpockets.

The film was selected as the Indonesian entry for the Best Foreign Language Film at the 83rd Academy Awards, but it didn't make the final shortlist.

== Plot ==
Muluk is a Bachelor of Management graduate that has remained unemployed for 2 years. While searching for a job, he witnesses a group of abandoned children led by a boy named Komet pickpocketing at the market. After failure to get hired, Muluk requests to Komet to be brought to the pickpockets' headquarters. He learns that there are 3 pickpocket divisions - mall, market, and public transportation. Muluk convinces the pickpocket boss, Jarot, to make him the financial manager of the pickpocketing proceeds in return for 10% of the proceeds. This increases Muluk's income, making him able to provide for himself and his father, Makbul, while impressing Haji Rachmat and his future father-in-law, Haji Sarbini.

Wanting the children to stop pickpocketing, Muluk attempts to make them street vendors, but they refuse. Muluk invites two of his friends - Samsul, a Bachelor of Education graduate who plays dominoes everyday, and Pipit, Haji Rachmat's daughter who is a Bachelor of Religious Education graduate who takes quizzes on TV and newspapers every day for prizes - to help him improve the pickpockets' knowledge. This proves to be successful, with the kids being more knowledgeable, and Jarot supports Muluk's business despite knowing his income might decrease.

On the day marking the kids stopping pickpocketing, Makbul, Rachmat, and Sarbini come to see what Muluk and his friends have been doing and end up disappointed when they learn that their money has come from illegal pickpocketing. Although Samsul insists on helping the children, Muluk and Pipit, guilty about giving their parents money gotten by illegal means, decide to stop. Muluk returns the gained money to Jarot and tools for the kids to start selling on the street.

After ending their business with the pickpockets, Muluk, Pipit, and Samsul return to their unemployed lives. Meanwhile, most of Jarot's children return to pickpocketing, except for Komet, the market division, and a member of the mall division. The ex-pickpocketers coincidentally meet Muluk when their street hustle causes traffic, bringing police nearby. Muluk helps the kids escape and gets detained as a result. While being driven away by the police, he bids the children farewell and smiles, proud that they have stopped pickpocketing.

== Cast ==
- Reza Rahadian - Muluk
- Tika Bravani - Pipit
- Deddy Mizwar - Pak Makbul
- Slamet Rahardjo - Haji Rachmat
- Asrul Dahlan - Samsul
- Sakurta H. Ginting - Ribut
- Rina Hasyim - Ibu Rachmat
- Jaja Mihardja - Haji Sarbini
- Tio Pakusodewo - Jarot

== See also ==
- List of submissions to the 83rd Academy Awards for Best Foreign Language Film
- List of Indonesian submissions for the Academy Award for Best Foreign Language Film
