= Identitas =

2009 film by Aria Kusumadewa

- Directed by: Aria Kusumadewa
- Written by: Aria Kusumadewa; Ken-chang Senior
- Produced by: Choky Situmorang
- Starring: Tio Pakusadewo; Leony VH; Ray Sahetapy; Titi Sjuman; Otiq Pakis; Norman Akyuwen
- Cinematography: Yatsky
- Production companies: Tits Film Workshop; Citra Sinema; Esa Film
- Release date: 6 August 2009
- Running time: 83 minutes
- Country: Indonesia
- Language: Indonesian

Identitas (lit. 'Identity') is a 2009 Indonesian drama film directed by Aria Kusumadewa. The film won four awards at the Indonesian Film Festival in 2010, including Best Film.

== Accolades ==
Award	Year	Category	Recipient	Result
Indonesian Movie Awards	2010	Best Lead Actor	Tio Pakusadewo	Won
Indonesian Film Festival	2010	Best Film	Choky Situmorang	Won
Indonesian Film Festival	2010	Best Directing	Aria Kusumadewa	Won
Indonesian Film Festival	2010	Best Lead Actor	Tio Pakusadewo	Won
Indonesian Film Festival	2010	Best Art Direction	Kekev Marlov	Won
Indonesian Film Festival	2010	Best Original Screenplay	Aria Kusumadewa	Nominated
Indonesian Film Festival	2010	Best Lead Actress	Leony VH	Nominated
Indonesian Film Festival	2010	Best Cinematography	Yatsky	Nominated
Indonesian Film Festival	2010	Best Editing	Go-chang Senior	Nominated
Indonesian Film Festival	2010	Best Sound Editing & Mixing	Edo WF Sitanggang	Nominated
