= Tio Pakusadewo =

Indonesian actor (born 1963)

- Born: Irwan Susetyo Pakusadewo; 2 September 1963 (age 63); Jakarta, Indonesia
- Other name: Tio Pakusadewo
- Education: Jakarta Institute of Arts
- Occupation: Actor
- Years active: 1987–present
- Awards: Citra Award for Best Leading Actor 1991 Lagu untuk Seruni 2009 Identitas

Kanjeng Raden Tumenggung Irwan Susetyo Pakusadewo or better known as Tio Pakusadewo (born in Jakarta, Indonesia on 2 September 1963) is an Indonesian actor of Javanese descent.

== Life and career ==
Tio was born on 2 September 1963 in Jakarta. He showed interest in the arts at an early age, taking up dance while in elementary school. In senior high he was active with the school's theatre troupe, and after graduating in 1985 Tio enrolled in the Jakarta Art Institute. On the side he worked as a model, and in 1987 he made his feature film debut playing opposite Rano Karno in Bilur-Bilur Penyesalan (Stripes of Regret), an adaptation of the novel by Mira W.

In 1988 Tio took four roles, including one in Catatan Si Boy II (Boy's Diary II), which gave him national recognition. His fame was cemented through his role in Garin Nugroho's Love in a Slice of Bread; 1990), which won the Citra Award for Best Film at the 1991 Indonesian Film Festival. Also in 1991, Tio received his first Citra Award for acting, for his role as an eccentric composer in Lagu Untuk Seruni.

During the early 1990s the domestic film industry faced a steep decline, and Tio began to focus on soap operas. In 1993 he established his own production hous, Kalbuku, which produced several serials, including Desy (1994), Lakon Tiga Duda (Story of Three Widowers; 1994), Anak-Anak Menteng (Children of Menteng; 1996), Telaga Kesabaran (Lake of Patience; 1996), and Tirai Sutra (Silk Curtains; 1996). The company, although initially highly successful, soon faced financial problems and closed; Tio also began facing a drug addiction. His last feature film role of the millennium was in Kuldesak (Dead End), an indie film co-directed by Mira Lesmana, Riza Mantovani, Riri Riza and Nan Triveni. The film was released in 1999.

Tio would not reenter the film industry until 2004, when he portrayed a "sugar daddy" in Hanny Saputra's film Virgin. His next film role, in Nia Dinata's Berbagi Suami (Love for Share; 2006), was as a polygamist who fears his four wives. Since 2007, Tio has appeared in at least two films every year. These span a variety of genres, including the horror film Legenda Sundel Bolong (Legend of Sundel Bolong; 2007), comedy Quickie Express (2007), drama Sang Penari (The Dancer; 2011), and thriller Pintu Terlarang (The Forbidden Door; 2009).

In 2010 Tio was granted the title Kanjeng Raden Tumenggung from the royal court at Sultanate of Yogyakarta; from which he is descended. That year he also established an acting school in Kemang, South Jakarta, because he considered the quality of most new Indonesian actors and actresses to be poor. The school teaches a method of acting developed by Tio himself.

== Accolades ==
Tio has received numerous film awards, beginning with a Citra Award for Best Leading Actor from the 1991 Indonesian Film Festival for Lagu Untuk Seruni. In 2008 he received another Citra Award nomination, this time for Best Supporting Actor, for his role in May. Another win for Best Leading Actor followed in 2009 (Identitas), and in 2010 Tio was nominated for Best Supporting Actor for Dilema Cinta 2 Hati. In 2011 (Tebus) and 2012 (Rayya, Cahaya Di Atas Cahaya) he was nominated for Best Leading Actor.

Aside from the Indonesian Film Festival, Tio has won multiple Golden Screen Awards from the Indonesian Movie Awards. His first was as Best Supporting Actor in 2008, for his role in Dimas Djayadiningrat's comedy Quickie Express. Two years later he won Best Leading Actor for his role in Identitas, and in 2011 he won Best Supporting Actor for Alangkah Lucunya (Negeri Ini).

After three years of hiatus, Tio returned to the big screen in 2016, taking the leading role of an Indonesian political exile in the film Letters from Prague. For his role in the film, he was nominated for Citra Award for Best Leading Actor in the 2016 Indonesian Film Festival, and won best actor award at the 2016 Indonesian Movie Awards and Usmar Ismail Awards. The film was selected as the Indonesian entry for the Best Foreign Language Film at the 89th Academy Awards.

Five films in which Tio has acted have been submitted for the Academy Award for Best Foreign Language Film. They are Bibir Mer, Berbagi Suami, Alangkah Lucunya (Negeri Ini), Sang Penari, and Letters from Prague.

== Personal life ==
Tio is a divorcee. He has three children. He is a fan of the works of Martin Scorsese and Francis Ford Coppola and has cited the latter's 1983 film The Outsiders as his favourite.

== Filmography ==
=== Film ===
| Year | Title | Role | Ref. |
|---|---|---|---|
| 1987 | Bilur-Bilur Penyesalan | Erik | |
| 1988 | Pengakuan | Budiman | |
| 1988 | Catatan Si Doi | Unknown Role | |
| 1988 | Catatan Si Boy II | Unknown Role | |
| 1988 | Cinta Anak Jaman | Unknown Role | |
| 1989 | Adikku Kekasihku | Unknown Role | |
| 1989 | Nuansa Birunya Rinjani | Kertiaji | |
| 1990 | Boleh-Boleh Aja | Anto | |
| 1990 | Pengantin | Agus | |
| 1990 | Cinta dalam Sepotong Roti | Topan | |
| 1990 | Lagu Untuk Seruni | Aria | |
| 1990 | Bibir Mer | Jodi | |
| 1990 | Rini Tomboy | Samil | |
| 1997 | Kuldesak | Unknown Role | |
| 2004 | Virgin (Ketika Keperawanan Dipertanyakan) | Good Man | |
| 2006 | Berbagi Suami | Koh Abun | |
| 2006 | Love is Cinta | Ryan's dad | |
| 2007 | Legenda Sundel Bolong | Danapati | |
| 2007 | Lantai 13 | Kuntara | |
| 2007 | Quickie Express | Matheo | |
| 2008 | Oh Baby | Mr. Yudo | |
| 2008 | Rahasia Bintang | Doctor Ging | |
| 2008 | May | Unknown Role | |
| 2008 | Lastri | Unknown Role | |
| 2008 | Susahnya Jadi Perawan | Unknown Role | |
| 2008 | Claudia/Jasmine | Dad | |
| 2009 | Pintu Terlarang | Koh Jimmy | |
| 2009 | Jagad X Code | Semsar | |
| 2009 | Kata Maaf Terakhir | Darma | |
| 2009 | Identitas | Adam | |
| 2010 | The Sexy City | Reno | |
| 2010 | Alangkah Lucunya (Negeri Ini) | Jarot | |
| 2011 | Tebus | Rony Danuatmaja | |
| 2011 | Golden Goal | Franciscus Walengkang | |
| 2011 | Sang Penari | Sergeant Binar | |
| 2012 | Rayya, Cahaya Di Atas Cahaya | Arya | |
| 2012 | Dilema | Lieutenant Bowo | |
| 2012 | Republik Twitter | Kemal Pambudi | |
| 2012 | Perahu Kertas | Mr. Wayan | |
| 2012 | Perahu Kertas 2 | Mr. Wayan | |
| 2012 | Sang Martir | Rambo | |
| 2012 | Habibie & Ainun | H. M Soeharto | |
| 2013 | Sang Pialang | Unknown Role | |
| 2013 | Rectoverso | Unknown Role | |
| 2013 | Mursala | Mr. Uda Oskar Simbolon | |
| 2013 | 9 Reasons | Old Soekarno | |
| 2013 | Java Heat | Vizier | |
| 2014 | The Raid 2 | Bangun | |
| 2014 | Guardian | Oscar | |
| 2014 | Marmut Merah Jambu | Ina's dad | |
| 2014 | Sang Pemberani | Unknown Role | |
| 2014 | Toilet Blues | Ruben | |
| 2014 | Aku, Kau & KUA | Aida's dad | |
| 2016 | Letters from Prague | Jaya | |
| 2016 | I Am Hope | Mia's dad | |
| 2017 | At Stake | Mr. Musa | |
| 2020 | Nona | Father | |
| 2022 | Stealing Raden Saleh | Permadi | |

=== Theater ===
| Year | Title | Role | Ref. |
|---|---|---|---|
| 2018 | Untuk Ibu | Erik | |

== Awards and nominations ==
| Year | Award | Category | Nominated work | Result | Ref. |
|---|---|---|---|---|---|
| 1991 | Indonesian Film Festival | Citra Award for Best Leading Actor | Lagu Untuk Seruni | Won | |
| 2006 | MTV Indonesia Movie Awards | Most Favorite Supporting Actor | Berbagi Suami | Won | |
| 2008 | Indonesian Movie Awards | Best Supporting Actor | Quickie Express | Won | |
| 2008 | Indonesian Film Festival | Citra Award for Best Leading Actor | May | Nominated | |
| 2009 | Indonesian Film Festival | Citra Award for Best Leading Actor | Identitas | Won | |
| 2010 | Indonesian Movie Awards | Best Actor | Identitas | Won | |
| 2010 | Indonesian Film Festival | Citra Award for Best Supporting Actor | Alangkah Lucunya (Negeri Ini) | Nominated | |
| 2011 | Indonesian Movie Awards | Best Supporting Actor | Alangkah Lucunya (Negeri Ini) | Nominated | |
| 2011 | Indonesian Film Festival | Citra Award for Best Leading Actor | Tebus | Nominated | |
| 2012 | Indonesian Movie Awards | Best Actor | Dilema | Nominated | |
| 2012 | Indonesian Movie Awards | Most Favorite Actor | Dilema | Won | |
| 2012 | Indonesian Film Festival | Citra Award for Best Leading Actor | Rayya, Cahaya Di Atas Langit | Nominated | |
| 2012 | Maya Awards | Best Actor in a Leading Role | Rayya, Cahaya Di Atas Langit | Nominated | |
| 2013 | Bandung Film Festival | Best Actor | Rayya, Cahaya Di Atas Langit | Nominated | |
| 2016 | Usmar Ismail Awards | Best Actor | Letters from Prague | Won | |
| 2016 | Indonesian Movie Awards | Best Actor | Letters from Prague | Won | |
| 2016 | Indonesian Movie Awards | Most Favorite Actor | Letters from Prague | Won | |
| 2016 | Indonesian Movie Awards | Best Chemistry (with Julie Estelle) | Letters from Prague | Nominated | |
| 2016 | Maya Awards | Best Actor in a Leading Role | Letters from Prague | Nominated | |
| 2016 | Indonesian Film Festival | Citra Award for Best Leading Actor | Letters from Prague | Nominated | |
| 2017 | Indonesian Film Festival | Citra Award for Best Supporting Actor | Night Bus | Nominated | |

== Works cited ==
- Asrianti, Tifa (30 May 2010). "The art imitating life of Tio Pakusadewo". The Jakarta Post. Archived from the original on 22 June 2013.
- "Bilur-bilur Penyesalan". filmindonesia.or.id (in Indonesian). Jakarta: Konfiden Foundation. Archived from the original on 12 April 2016.
- "Filmografi Tio Pakusadewo" [Filmography Tio Pakusadewo]. filmindonesia.or.id (in Indonesian). Jakarta: Konfiden Foundation. Archived from the original on 5 July 2014.
- "Penghargaan Tio Pakusadewo" [Awards for Tio Pakusadewo]. filmindonesia.or.id (in Indonesian). Jakarta: Konfiden Foundation. Archived from the original on 5 July 2014.
- Siregar, Lisa (7 January 2011). "Mira Lesmana: The Fighter for Indonesian Film". The Jakarta Globe.
- "Tio Pakusadewo". filmindonesia.or.id (in Indonesian). Jakarta: Konfiden Foundation. Archived from the original on 31 December 2013.
- "Tio Pakusadewo" (in Indonesian). Taman Ismail Marzuki.
