= Jajang C. Noer =

Indonesian actress and producer (born 1952)

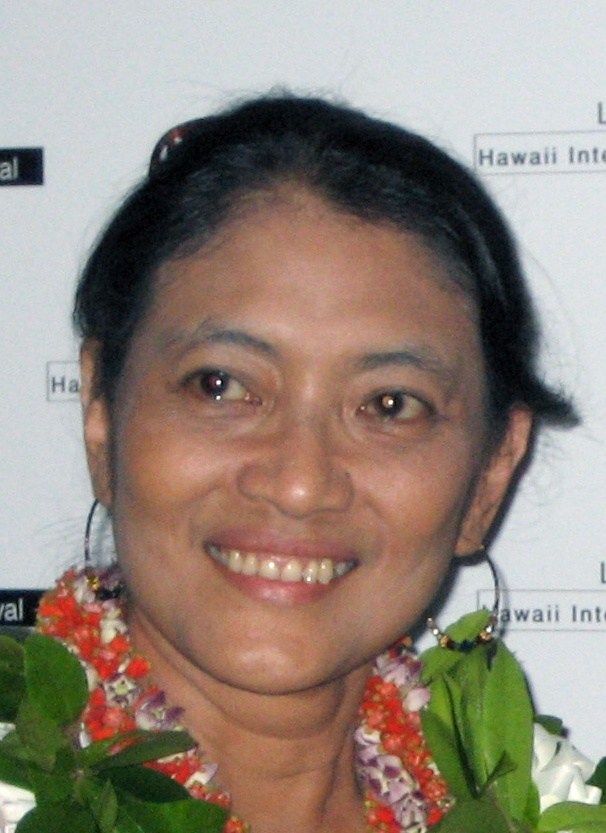
- Jajang in 2006
- Born: Lidia Djunita Pamontjak; 28 June 1952 (age 74); Paris, France
- Other name: Jajang C. Noer
- Occupations: Actress; Producer; Writer
- Spouse: Arifin C. Noer (m. 1978; died 1995)
- Children: Nitta Nasyra Chairin Noer; Marah Laut Chairin Noer
- Parent(s): Nazir Datuk Pamoentjak (father); Nini Karim (mother)
- Awards: Citra Award for Best Supporting Actress 1992 Mer's Lips 2013 Cinta Tapi Beda

Lidia Djunita Pamontjak or better known as Jajang C. Noer (born 28 June 1952 in Paris, France) is a France-born Indonesian actress and film producer of Minangkabau descent. She is also the only daughter of Indonesian national independence movement figure, Nazir Datuk Pamoentjak.

== Filmography ==
Indonesian title	English title	Year
Serangan Fajar	Dawn Attack	1981
Djakarta 1966		1982
Matahari-Matahari	The Sun	1985
Cintaku di rumah susun		1987
Bibir Mer	Mer's Lips	1992
Surat untuk bidadari	Letter to an Angel	1994
Nama Saya Selasih	My name is Selasih	1994
Eliana, Eliana		2002
Durian		2003
Biola tak berdawai	The Stringless Violin	2003
Joni Be Brave		2003
Arisan!	The Gathering	2003
Janji Joni	Joni's Promise	2005
Garasi	Garage	2006
Berbagi suami	Love for Share	2006
D'Girlz Begins		2006
6:30		2006
Jamila dan Sang Presiden		2009
Khalifah		2011
Makmum	Congregation	2019
Sara		2023
Siksa Kubur	Grave Torture	2024

== Awards and nominations ==
Year	Award	Category	Recipients	Result
1992	Indonesian Film Festival	Citra Award for Best Supporting Actress	Mer's Lips	Won
2004	MTV Indonesia Movie Awards	Most Favorite Supporting Actress	Biola Tak Berdawai	Nominated
2004	Indonesian Film Festival	Citra Award for Best Leading Actress	Eliana, Eliana	Nominated
2010	Indonesian Film Festival	Citra Award for Best Leading Actress	7 Hati 7 Cinta 7 Wanita	Nominated
2012	Indonesian Film Festival	Citra Award for Best Leading Actress	Mata Tertutup	Nominated
2013	Indonesian Film Festival	Citra Award for Best Supporting Actress	Cinta tapi Beda	Won
2014	Indonesian Film Festival	Citra Award for Best Supporting Actress	3 Nafas Likas	Nominated
2014	Indonesian Film Festival	Citra Award for Best Supporting Actress	Cahaya dari Timur: Beta Maluku	Nominated
2015	Maya Award	Best Actress in a Supporting Role	Toba Dreams	Nominated

== Miscellaneous ==
- Her father is an Indonesian activist in the Dutch colonial era, Nazir Datuk Pamoentjak
