= 2017 Indonesian Film Festival =

Award ceremony for Indonesian films of 2017

Indonesian Film Festival
- Date: 11 November 2017
- Site: Grand Kawanua International Convention Hall, Manado, North Sulawesi, Indonesia
- Hosted by: Denny Chandra; Kezia Warouw

Highlights
- Best Picture: Night Bus
- Most awards: Satan's Slaves (7)
- Most nominations: Kartini (14)

Television coverage
- Network: Global TV; iNews; TVRI

The 37th Citra Awards ceremony took place on 11 November 2017 at the Grand Kawanua International Convention Hall in Manado, North Sulawesi, Indonesia. It was hosted by comedian Denny Chandra and Puteri Indonesia 2016 titleholder Kezia Warouw. The ceremony honored the achievement in Indonesian cinema of 2017. This year, there was one new category that was awarded for the first time, Best Makeup. The ceremony was broadcast on Global TV, iNews and TVRI.

Action thriller film Night Bus won six awards out of eleven nominations, including Best Picture. Biographical drama based on the life of Indonesian activist R.A. Kartini, Kartini garnered the most nominations with fourteen nominations and won an award, Best Supporting Actress for Christine Hakim. Horror film Satan's Slaves won the most awards with seven.

== Host city selection ==
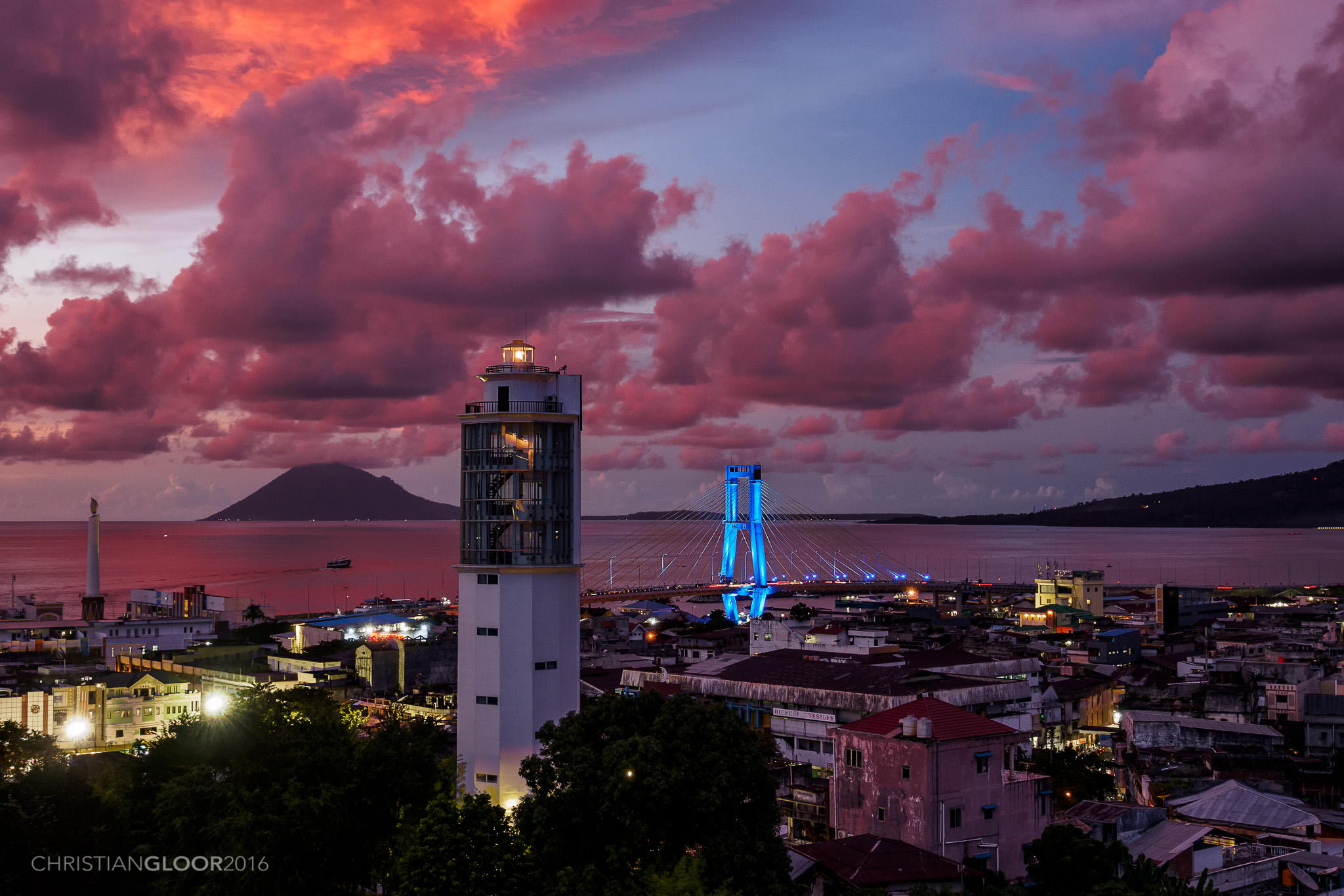
2017 host city, Manado.

During the opening ceremony on 21 August 2017, the organizing committee announced Manado, North Sulawesi, as the host city for the 2017 award, with the awards ceremony set to take place on 11 November. The selection, according to Leni Lolang, the chairperson of the organizing committee, was part of the festival's effort to accommodate regional requests.

This marked the fourth ceremony took place outside of Jakarta, following previous ceremonies in Semarang in 2013, Palembang in 2014, and South Tangerang in 2015.

== Winners and nominations ==
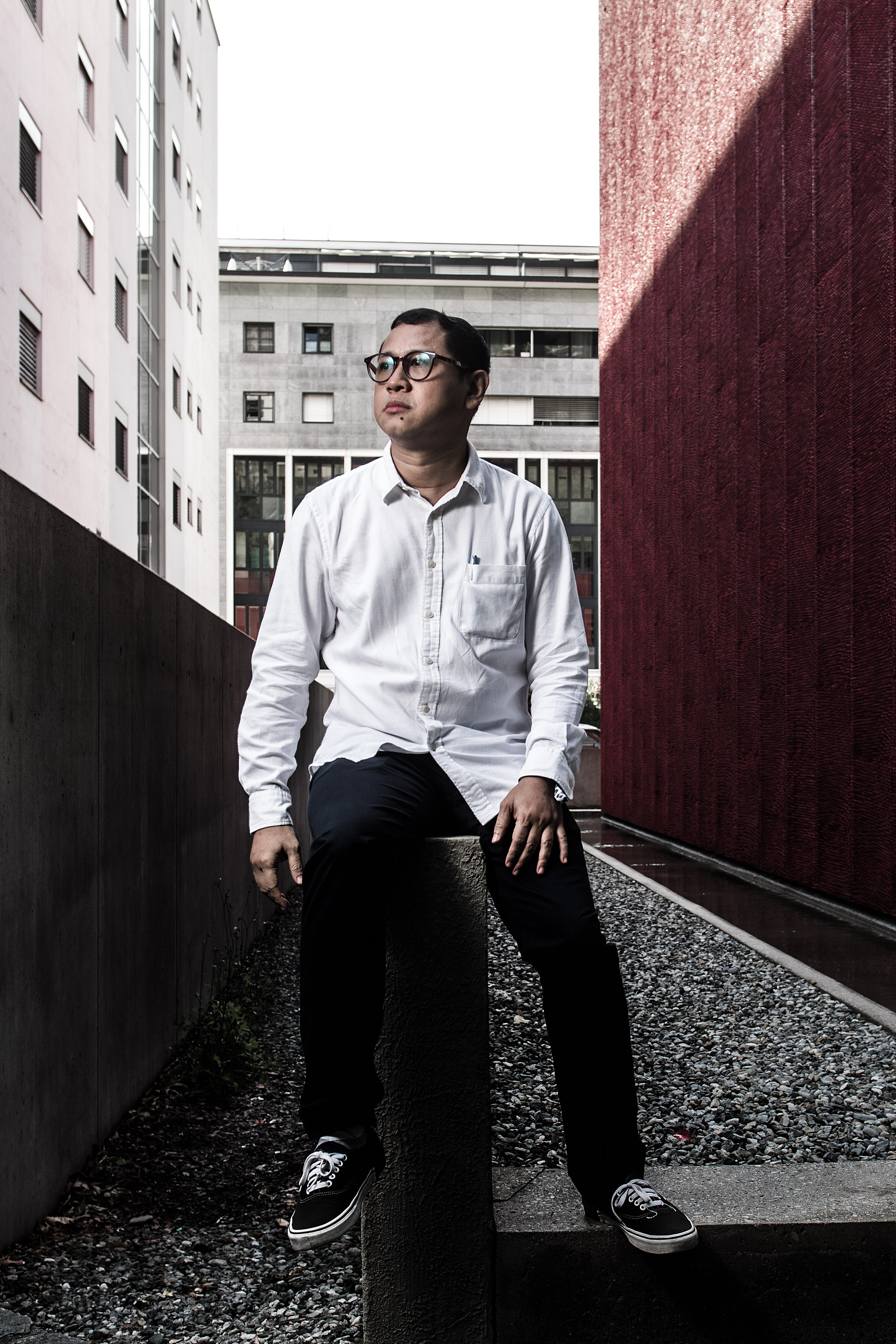
Edwin, Best Director winner

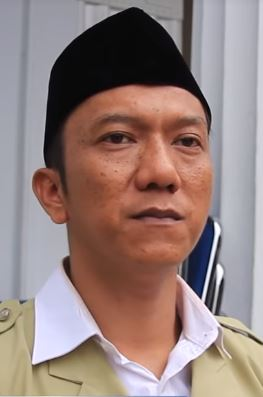
Teuku Rifnu Wikana, Best Actor winner

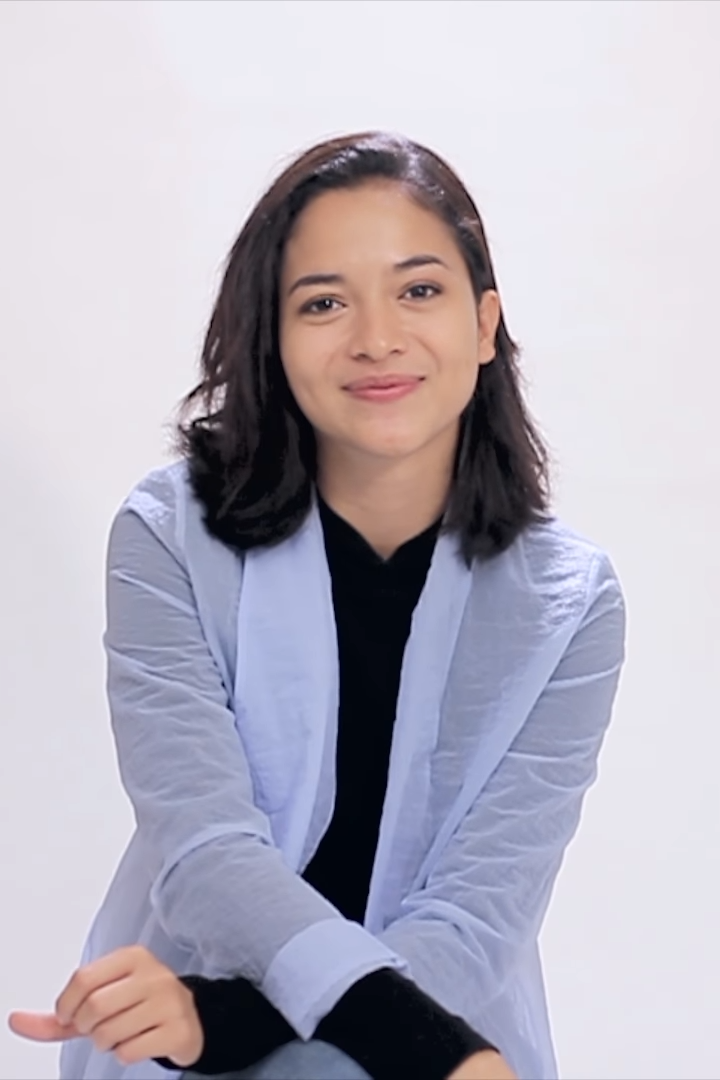
Putri Marino, Best Actress winner

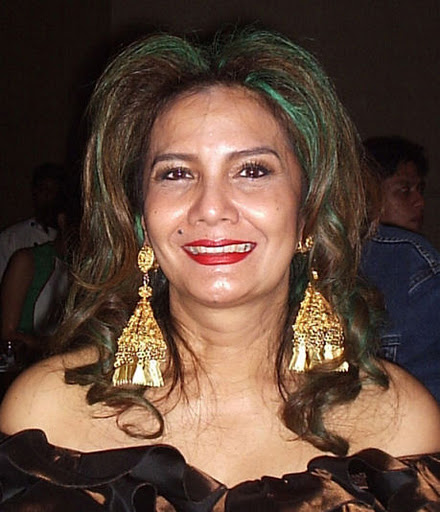
Christine Hakim, Best Supporting Actress winner

The nominations were announced on 5 October 2017 at the Raffles Hotel, Jakarta. Kartini and Satan's Slaves received the most nominations with fourteen and thirteen, respectively.

Winners are listed first, highlighted in boldface, and indicated with a double dagger (‡).

**Best Picture**: **Night Bus – Darius Sinathrya and Teuku Rifnu Wikana**‡; Check the Store Next Door – Chand Parwez Servia and Fiaz Servia; Kartini – Robert Ronny; Posesif – Muhammad Zaidy and Meiske Taurisia; Satan's Slaves – Gope T. Samtani	**Best Director**: **Edwin – Posesif**‡; Joko Anwar – Satan's Slaves; Hanung Bramantyo – Kartini; Ody C. Harahap – Sweet 20; Emil Heradi – Night Bus; Ernest Prakasa – Check the Store Next Door
**Best Actor**: **Teuku Rifnu Wikana – Night Bus as Bagudung / Hartop Sinaga**‡; Adipati Dolken – Posesif as Yudhis Ibrahim; Deddy Sutomo – Kartini as R.M. Sosroningrat; Ernest Prakasa – Check the Store Next Door as Erwin	**Best Actress**: **Putri Marino – Posesif as Lala Anindhita**‡; Adinia Wirasti – Critical Eleven as Anya; Dian Sastrowardoyo – Kartini as Kartini; Sheryl Sheinafia – Galih & Ratna as Ratna; Tatjana Saphira – Sweet 20 as Fatmawati / Mieke
**Best Supporting Actor**: **Yayu Unru – Posesif as Lala's father**‡; Alex Abbad – Night Bus as Mahdi; Dion Wiyoko – Check the Store Next Door as Yohan; Slamet Rahardjo – Sweet 20 as Hamzah; Tio Pakusadewo – Night Bus as Hakim	**Best Supporting Actress**: **Christine Hakim – Kartini as Ngasirah**‡; Adinia Wirasti – Check the Store Next Door as Ayu; Cut Mini – Posesif as Diana; Djenar Maesa Ayu – Kartini as Moeryam; Marissa Anita – Galih & Ratna as Tantri; Niniek L. Karim – Sweet 20 as Fatmawati; Widyawati – Sweet 20 as Rahayu
**Best Original Screenplay**: **Check the Store Next Door – Ernest Prakasa**‡; Bid'ah Cinta – Zaim Rofiqi, Nurman Hakim, and Ben Sohib; Hangout – Raditya Dika; Posesif – Gina S. Noer; Stip & Pensil – Joko Anwar, Ernest Prakasa, and Bene Dion Rajagukguk	**Best Adapted Screenplay**: **Night Bus – Rahabi Mandra and Teuku Rifnu Wikana; based on short story "Selamat" by Wikana**‡; Galih & Ratna – Fathan Todjon and Lucky Kuswandi; based on the novel Gita Cinta dari SMA by Eddy D. Iskandar; Kartini – Bagus Bramanti and Hanung Bramantyo; based on the life of Kartini; Satan's Slaves – Joko Anwar; based on the film Satan's Slave, written by Imam Tantowi, Naryono Prayitno, and Sisworo Gautama Putra; Sweet 20 – Upi Avianto; based on the film Miss Granny, written by Shin Dong-ik, Hong Yun-jeong, and Dong Hee-seon
**Best Documentary Feature**: **Eyelashes – Tonny Trimarsanto**‡; Balada Bala Sinema – Yuda Kurniawan; Banda: The Dark Forgotten Trail – Jay Subyakto; Ibu (An Extraordinary Mother) – Patar Simatupang; Negeri Dongeng – Anggi Frisca; Tarling Is Darling – Ismail Fahmi Lubis	**Best Documentary Short Film**: **The Unseen Words – Wahyu Utami Wati**‡; Along the One Way – Bani Nasution; Anak Koin – Chrisila Wentiasri; Dluwang: The Past from the Trash – Agni Tirta; Living in Rob – Fuad Hilmi Hirnanda; Solastalgia – Kurnia Yudha F; Songbird: Burung Berkicau – Wisnu Surya Pratama
**Best Live Action Short Film**: **The Malediction – Makbul Mubarak**‡; Amak – Ella Angel; Babaran– Meilani Dina Pangestika; BuAng – Eugene Panji; Jendela – Randi Pratama; Kleang Kabur Kanginan – Riyanto Tan Ageraha; Lintah Darat – Putri Zakiyatun Nimah; Nyathil – Anggita Dwi Mardiana; Pentas Terakhir– Triyanto "Genthong" Hapsoro; Regards from the Southern Crab – Zhafran Solichin	**Best Animated Short Film**: **Lukisan Nafas – Fajar Ramayel**‡; Darmuji 66: Bhinneka di Persimpangan – Ahmad Hafidz Azro'i; Kaie and the Phantasus' Giants – Ahmad Hafidz Azro'i; Make A Wish – Salsabilla Aulia Rahma; Mudik – Calvin Chandra, Ardhira Anugrah Putra, Alfonsus Andre, and Aditya Prabaswara
**Best Cinematography**: **Satan's Slaves – Ical Tanjung**‡; Galih & Ratna – Amalia TS; Kartini – Faozan Rizal; Night Bus – Anggi Frisca; Posesif – Batara Goempar	**Best Film Editing**: **Night Bus – Kelvin Nugroho and Sentot Sahid**‡; Check the Store Next Door – Cesa David Luckmansyah; Critical Eleven – Ryan Purwoko; Kartini – Wawan I. Wibowo; Posesif – W. Ichwandiardono; Satan's Slaves – Arifin Cu'unk; Sweet 20 – Aline Jusria
**Best Original Score**: **Satan's Slaves – Aghi Narottama, Tony Merle, dan Bemby Gusti**‡; Galih & Ratna – Ivan Gojaya; Filosofi Kopi 2: Ben & Jody – Macanderson; I Leave My Heart in Lebanon – Thoersi Argeswara; Mooncake Story – Tya Subiakto	**Best Original Song**: **"Kelam Malam" from Satan's Slaves – Music, Lyrics and Performed by The Spouse**‡; "Sekali Lagi" from Critical Eleven – Music and Lyrics by Isyana Sarasvati, Daniel Caesar and Ludwig Lindell; Performed by Sarasvati; "Dalam Kenangan" from Surga Yang Tak Dirindukan 2 – Music and Lyrics by Melly Goeslaw; Performed by Krisdayanti; "Senyuman & Harapan" from Check the Store Next Door – Music and Lyrics by Mada Emmanuelle; Performed by Gamaliel Audrey Cantika and The Overtunes
**Best Sound**: **Satan's Slaves – Khikmawan Santosa and Anhar Moha**‡; Check the Store Next Door – Khikmawan Santosa, Mohamad Ikhsan Sungkar, and Madunazka; Critical Eleven – Khikmawan Santosa, Mohamad Ikhsan Sungkar, and Suhadi; I Leave My Heart in Lebanon – Dwi Budi Priyanto and Khikmawan Santosa; Kartini – Khikmawan Santosa and Sutrisno; Night Bus – Wahyu Tri Purnomo and Jantra Suryaman	**Best Visual Effects**: **Satan's Slaves – Heri Kuntoro and Abby Eldipie (Finalize Studios)**‡; The Doll 2 – Dana Riza and Faranas Irmal (Fixit Works); Firegate – OrangeRoom CS; Night Bus – Amrin Nugraha; I Leave My Heart in Lebanon – Dana Riza and Faranas Irmal (Fixit Works); Rafathar – Epix Studio, Postima, and MAG
**Best Art Direction**: **Satan's Slaves – Allan Sebastian**‡; Filosofi Kopi 2: Ben & Jody – Benny Lauda; Kartini – Allan Sebastian; Sweet 20 – Vida Sylvia	**Best Child Performer**: **Muhammad Adhiyat – Satan's Slaves as Ian**‡; Aisha Nurra Datau – Iqro: Petualangan Meraih Bintang as Aqila; Bima Azriel – Surat Kecil untuk Tuhan as Anton; Muhammad Iqbal – Stip & Pensil as Ucok; Muhammad Razi – Surau & Silek as Adil; Neysa Chandra Melisenda – Kartini as young Kartini
**Best Makeup**: **Night Bus – Cherry Wirawan**‡; Firegate – Cherry Wirawan and Dian Anggraini Puspitasari; Kartini – Darto Unge; Posesif – Cika Rianda; Satan's Slaves – Darwyn Tse	**Best Costume Design**: **Night Bus – Gemailla Gea Geriantiana**‡; Filosopi Kopi 2: Ben & Jody – Anggia Kharisma; Kartini – Retno Ratih Damayanti; Satan's Slaves – Isabelle Patrice; Sweet 20 – Dara Asvia

=== Films with multiple nominations and awards ===
Films that received multiple nominations
Nominations	Film
14	Kartini
13	Satan's Slaves
11	Night Bus
10	Posesif
9	Check the Store Next Door
9	Sweet 20
5	Galih & Ratna
4	Critical Eleven
3	Filosofi Kopi 2: Ben & Jody
3	I Leave My Heart in Lebanon
2	Firegate
2	Stip & Pensil

Films that received multiple awards
Awards	Film
7	Satan's Slaves
6	Night Bus
3	Posesif
