= 2018 Indonesian Movie Actors Awards =

Film industry award ceremony

12th Annual Indonesian Movie Actors Awards
- Date: 4 July 2018
- Location: Studio 14 MNC Studios, Jakarta
- Country: Indonesia
- Hosted by: Daniel Mananta; Nirina Zubir
- Website: http://www.rcti.tv/imaa

Television/radio coverage
- Network: RCTI

The 2018 Indonesian Movie Actors Awards was the 12th annual Indonesian Movie Actors Awards show, held at studio 14 MNC Studios, Jakarta and organised by RCTI. Daniel Mananta and Nirina Zubir hosted the ceremony, which was attended by the CEO of MNC Group, Hary Tanoesoedibjo. It was postponed from May to July because of a clash with Eid al-Fitr.

In this awards show, Dilan 1990 won Favourite Film, the viewers' choice award. This film, along with the film Marlina the Murderer in Four Acts each won three awards, the most of any film that year.

== Judges ==
Name	Profession
Aditya Gumay	Director
Garin Nugroho	Director
Lukman Sardi	Actor
Salman Aristo	Scriptwriter
Sheila Timothy	President of the Indonesian Association of Film Producers

== Presenters ==
- Rossa
- Virgoun Tambunan
- Maria Simorangkir
- Marion Jola
- Brisia Jodie Maurinne
- Ahmad Abdul
- Abraham Kevin Aprilio Dumatubun

== Winners and nominees ==
=== Best ===
Winners are listed first and highlighted in boldface.

Best Actor	Best Actress
**Teuku Rifnu Wikana – Night Bus**; Adipati Dolken – Posesif; Reza Rahardian – Critical Eleven; Rukman Rosadi – Ziarah; Vino G Bastian – Chrisye	**Marsha Timothy – Marlina the Murderer in Four Acts**; Acha Septriasa – Bunda, Kisah Cinta Dua Kodi; Ponco Sutiyem – Ziarah; Putri Marino – Posesif; Tatjana Saphira – Sweet 20
Best Supporting Actor	Best Supporting Actress
**Deddy Sutomo – Kartini**; Lukman Sardi – A Diary of Letters to God; Ringgo Agus Rahman – Satu Hari Nanti; Slamet Rahardjo – Sweet 20; Yayu Unru – Night Bus	**Christine Hakim – Kartini**; Ayu Laksmi – Sekala Niskala; Dea Panendra – Marlina the Murderer in Four Acts; Djenar Maesa Ayu – Kartini; Niniek L. Karim – Sweet 20
Best Newcomer Actor/Actress	Best Children Role
**Putri Marino – Posesif**; Dea Panendra – Marlina the Murderer in Four Acts; Refal Hady – Galih dan Ratna; Slamet Aambari – Turah; Vanesha Prescilla – Dilan 1990	**Ni Kadek Thaly Titi Kasih – Sekala Niskala**; Bima Azriel – A Diary of Letters to God; Ida Bagus Putu Radithya Mahijasena – Sekala Niskala; Messy Gusti – Night Bus; Muhammad Adhiyat – Satan's Slaves
Best Chemistry	Best Ensemble
**Marsha Timothy and Dea Panendra – Marlina the Murderer in Four Acts**; Adipati Dolken and Putri Marino – Posesif; Iqbaal Ramadhan and Vanesha Prescilla – Dilan 1990; Ringgo Agus Rahman and Adinia Wirasti – Satu Hari Nanti; Teuku Rifnu Wikana and Yayu Unru – Night Bus	**Rapi Films – Satan's Slaves**; Starvision Plus – Critical Eleven; Max Pictures – Dilan 1990; Legacy Pictures – Kartini; Cinesurya Production, Kaninga Pictures – Marlina the Murderer in Four Acts; Starvision Plus – Susah Sinyal; Starvision Plus, CJ Entertainment – Sweet 20

=== Favourite ===
Winners are listed first and highlighted in boldface.

Favourite Actor	Favourite Actress
**Vino G Bastian** – Chrisye; Adipati Dolken – Posesif; Reza Rahardian – Critical Eleven; Rukman Rosadi – Ziarah; Teuku Rifnu Wikana – Night Bus	**Tatjana Saphira** – Sweet 20; Acha Septriasa – Bunda, Kisah Cinta Dua Kodi; Marsha Timothy – Marlina the Murderer in Four Acts; Ponco Sutiyem – Ziarah; Putri Marino – Posesif
Favourite Supporting Actor	Favourite Supporting Actress
**Slamet Rahardjo**– Sweet 20; Deddy Sutomo – Kartini; Lukman Sardi – A Diary of Letters to God; Ringgo Agus Rahman – Satu Hari Nanti; Yayu Unru – Night Bus	**Niniek L. Karim** – Sweet 20; Ayu Laksmi – Sekala Niskala; Christine Hakim – Kartini; Dea Panendra – Marlina the Murderer in Four Acts; Djenar Maesa Ayu – Kartini
Favourite Newcomer Actor/Actress	Favourite Film
**Vanesha Prescilla – Dilan 1990**; Dea Panendra – Marlina the Murderer in Four Acts; Refal Hady – Galih dan Ratna; Putri Marino – Posesif; Slamet Aambari – Turah	**Dilan 1990 – Max Pictures**; Critical Eleven – Starvision Plus, Legacy Pictures; Kartini – Legacy Pictures; Marlina the Murderer in Four Acts – Cinesurya Production, Kaninga Pictures; Night Bus – Night Bus Pictures; Satan's Slaves – Rapi Films; Posesif – Palari Films; Sekala Niskala – Treewater, Fourcolours Films; Susah Sinyal – Starvision Plus; Sweet 20 – Starvision Plus, CJ Entertainment; Turah – Fourcolours Films; Yowis Ben – Starvision Plus

=== Lifetime Achievement and Special Awards ===
The Lifetime Achievement award is given to a person regarded as the most dedicated to Indonesian cinema that year. The 2018 award was given to the veteran actor Adi Kurdi. Special Awards were also given to Amoroso Katamsi and Deddy Sutomo.
