= Gritte Agatha =

Indonesian actress

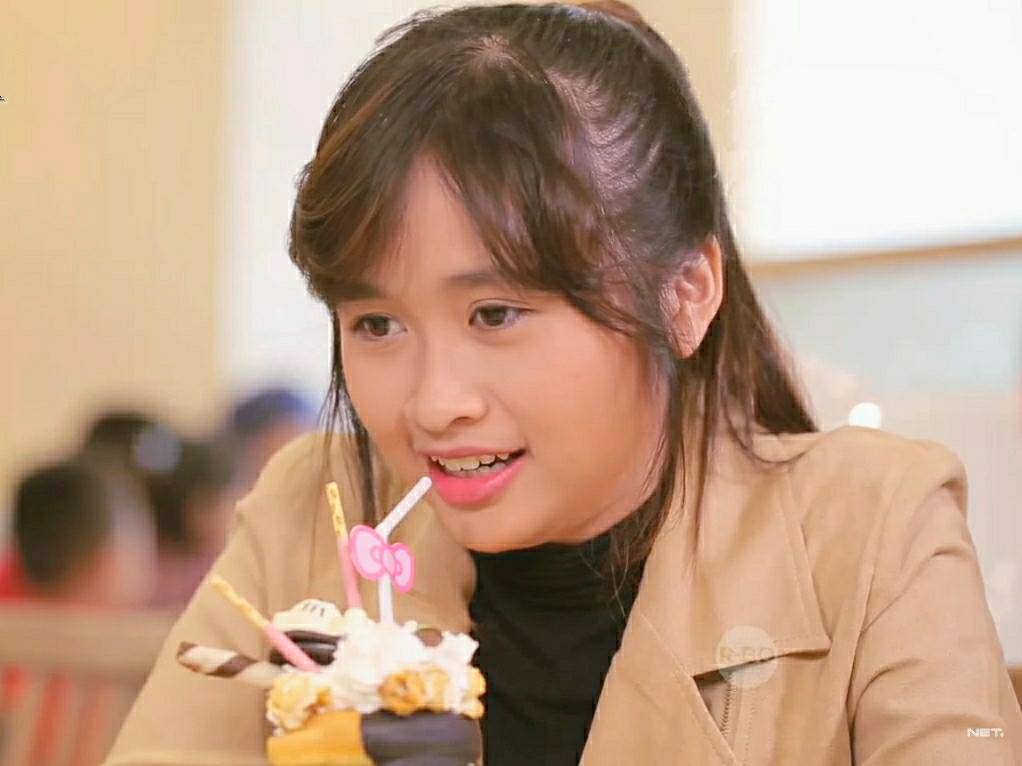
- Gritte Agatha in 2017
- Born: Griselda Agatha; March 9, 1996 (age 30); Jakarta, Indonesia
- Education: Gandhi School Ancol; Multimedia Nusantara University
- Occupations: Celebrity; Director; Film producer; YouTuber; Writer
- Years active: 2006–present
- Spouse: Arif Hidayat (m. 2023)

Griselda Agatha (born 9 March 1996), known as Gritte Agatha, is an Indonesian actress, director, film producer, YouTuber, and writer.

== Career ==
Gritte Agatha started her career as a supporting actress on the soap opera Ratapan Anak Tiri in 2006. However, she became famous after acting as Mae on Get Married the Series. As a YouTuber, Gritte Agatha is known for her content in a podcast titled Gritte Buka Praktek.

== Filmography ==
=== Films ===
Year	Title	Role	Notes	Ref.
2008	Rahasia Bintang	Sheila		
2012	Brandal-Brandal Ciliwung	Sisi		
2016	Surat Untukmu	Esti		
2017	The Underdogs	Aci		
2017	Posesif	Ega		
2022	Ashiap Man	Diana		

=== Films ===
Year	Title	Role	Notes	Ref.
2016	Buk..?	No	as a director and writer	
2016	Love, Dandelion	Luna	as a director and writer	
2017	Color of my Life	No	as a producer	
2017	Pertama Kali	No	as a producer	
2017	Sebentar Saja	No		as a director and writer
2017	Selalu Cantik	No		as a producer
2018	Matchalatte	No		as a producer and writer
2018	Matchalatte 2	Drawer tea girl		
2019	Terus Didekatmu	No	as a producer	
2019	Kembali Ke Fitri?	Gian	as a producer	

=== Web series ===
Year	Title	Role	Notes	Ref.
2019	Unseen	Kimmy		
2019	Check In	Ayu		
2020	Julid Oh Julid	Dina		
2022–2023	Ketua BEM and His Secret Wife	Karina		

=== Television series ===
Year	Title	Role	Notes	Ref.
2006	Ratapan Anak Tiri		Figuran; Episode 1	
2007	Dongeng	Fina	Episode: "Anak-Anak Pembuat Kue"	
2007	Dongeng	Nanan	Episode: "Pinokio"	
2010–2011	Get Married the Series	Maemunah (Mae)		
2012–2013	Kutunggu Kau Dipasar Minggu	Ayuni		
2013	Tendangan Si Madun season 3	Siti		
2014	Oh Ternyata	Luna	Episode: "Bukan Cewek Biasa"	
2014–2015	Bidadari Takut Jatuh Cinta	Bintang		
2015	Madun	Anisa Ayunda		
2016–2018	The East	Silvi		
2017	Seribu Kisah		Episode: "Terdampar Di Masa Depan"	
2018	Jodoh Wasiat Bapak	Prisil		

=== Television films ===
- Pemulung Jadi Sarjana (2016) as Azizah
- Aku Hanya Seorang Anak Pancingan (2016) as Devi
- Ayah Pergi dan Tak Kembali (2016)

=== TV shows ===
- Malam Jumat (Usee Prime, 2023)

=== Music video appearances ===
Year	Title	Singer	Notes	Ref.
2008	"Tersenyumlah"	Tere		
2020	"Tentang Kamu"	Lyodra Ginting		

== Discography ==
=== Single ===
Main Single
Year	Title	Album	Notes	Ref.
2021	"Masih Mencinta"	Non-album single		
