= Elbahouse =

Manufacturing plant in Jordan

Elba House Company
- Company type: Private
- Headquarters: Amman, Jordan
- Area served: Worldwide

Elba house is an Amman-based company that manufactures and assembles bus bodies. The company is a partnership divided equally between the Iraqi Ministry of Transportation and a Jordanian family named Khoury.

== Headquarters ==
Elbahouse's headquarters and factories are located in Amman, with a total area of 100,000 square meters. The constructed area covers approximately 50,000 square meters.

== History ==
The company was established in 1976 on 10 hectares of land located in Amman, Jordan with a capacity to assemble more than 2000 buses each year. Some of the current production is listed below:

- Grand Star
- Royal Star
- Silver Star
- Town Star
