= I Leave My Heart in Lebanon =

I Leave My Heart In Lebanon is a 2016 Indonesian drama film directed by Benni Setiawan and starring Rio Dewanto, Yama Carlos, Boris Bokir, Revalina S Temat, Baim Wong, Dedy Mizwar, Tri Yudiman and Lebanese artist Jowy Khoury. It was released in Indonesian cinemas on December 15, 2016.
