= Mendadak Dangdut =

- Promotional poster
- Directed by: Rudy Soedjarwo
- Written by: Monty Tiwa
- Produced by: Leo Sutanto; Elly Yanti Noor
- Starring: Titi Kamal; Kinaryosih; Dwi Sasono
- Cinematography: Rudy Soedjarwo
- Edited by: Rudi Soedjarwo; Adjeng MJ; Khrishto Damar Alam
- Music by: Andi Rianto
- Distributed by: SinemArt
- Release date: 10 August 2006
- Running time: 90 minutes
- Country: Indonesia
- Language: Indonesian

Mendadak Dangdut (Suddenly Dangdut) is a 2006 Indonesian musical comedy-drama film directed by Rudy Soedjarwo and written by Monty Tiwa. Starring Titi Kamal, Kinaryosih, and Dwi Sasono, it details the rise and fall of an alternative rock-turned-dangdut singer and her sister-cum-manager.

Shot over a period of seven days, Mendadak Dangdut addresses social themes such as poverty. The film's release was preceded by a soundtrack album, which was ultimately more commercially viable than the film itself; one single, "Jablai" ("Rarely Caressed"), became a staple of dangdut concerts for several months. The film, which received mixed critical reception, proved a breakthrough role for Kamal and won 12 awards, including Favourite Film at the 2007 Indonesian Movie Awards.

== Plot ==
Petris (Titi Kamal) is an egotistical and emotional alternative rock vocalist at the start of her career. She often argues with her sister and manager, Yulia (Kinaryosih). One day they are caught with a large amount of heroin, which belongs to Yulia's boyfriend, in their car. They escape the police and reach a nearby village, where a travelling dangdut concert is located. The performer has quit, and thus the concert needs a new singer. Yulia, who considers it a way to escape the police, tells Petris that they should join the group. At first reluctant, Petris then agrees and takes up the stage name Iis.

While with the group, Petris lives with its owner/manager Rizal (Dwi Sasono), whom she admires and for whom Yulia begins falling. Petris improves her vocals and becomes aware of the poverty and misfortune endured by the people in villages where she performs. She and the group become famous and receive numerous job offers; meanwhile, the sisters feel relieved as they are no longer pursued by the police. After several weeks Petris and Yulia have a big fight, which leaves Yulia in tears. Petris, feeling guilty, chases after her sister and finds her at Rizal's house. Seeing her sister's pain makes Petris more understanding of other people.

After counting the proceeds, the sisters leave the house. However, they are approached by police and are caught in an attempt to escape. Petris tells her sister to escape, taking all the blame upon herself; Yulia gives herself up after seeing her Petris arrested. At the police station the sisters are told that they are no longer wanted for the drug charges, as Yulia's ex-boyfriend had been caught, but must serve time for escaping the police. While in prison, Petris becomes a singer and entertains her fellow inmates.

== Cast ==
- Titi Kamal as Petris
- Kinaryosih as Yulia
- Dwi Sasono as Rizal
- Teuku Rifnu Wikana as Police man
- Vincent Rompies as Gary

== Production ==
Mendadak Dangdut was directed by Rudy Soedjarwo. In an interview, Soedjarwo said that he directed the film to contrast city people and villagers, including economic differences; he often inserted messages on morality into his films. The script was written by Monty Tiwa, who initially had difficulty selling it as studios considered it uncommercial. He also wrote the film's soundtrack. The two had previously worked together on Soedjarwo's drama film 9 Naga (9 Dragons; 2006).

Former fashion model Titi Kamal was cast as Petris. For the role, Kamal took vocal coaching in both pop and dangdut. The low-budget work was filmed over a period of seven days in various parts of Jakarta.

== Release and reception ==
Menadadak Dangdut was released in Indonesia on 10 August 2006, with a soundtrack album preceding it in July and a novelisation released not long afterwards. The film was a moderate box office hit but was outperformed by its soundtrack; one of the songs from the film, "Jablai" ("Rarely Caressed"), became a staple of dangdut concerts after the film's release. The film saw another theatrical release on 1 November 2007, this time in Malaysia.

Benny Benke, reviewing for the Semarang-based newspaper Suara Merdeka after a press screening, found the film to be fresh, fun, and interesting, with a down to earth plot and good soundtrack. In a review for Tempo magazine, Yos Rizal S. and Evieta Fadjar wrote that the plot suffered a little from a lack of logic, but that the dangdut music was well packaged for city dwellers. Sita Planasari A., in another review for the magazine, described the film as clearly meant to entertain; she found the acting in Mendadak Dangdut to be strong, but wrote that the plot suffered from a lack of logic and that the cinematography was like that of a soap opera.

The film proved Titi Kamal's breakthrough role, as she was cast in several prestigious films and received numerous recording opportunities afterwards. Meanwhile, Soedjarwo continued using an express shooting style with his next box-office hit, the horror film Pocong 2 (2007).

== Soundtrack ==
The soundtrack album to Mendadak Dangdut included ten songs, with seven sung by Titi Kamal.

Track listing

No.	Title	Writer(s)	Vocals	Length
1.	"Bunuh Reality" ("Kill Reality")		Titi Kamal
2.	"Jablai (Jarang Dibelai)" ("Jablai (Rarely Caressed)")		Titi Kamal
3.	"Dangdutkah Kita" ("Are We Dangdut")		The Mon's
4.	"Mars Pembantu" ("March of the Housemaids")	Monty Tiwa, Uki Nuril, Nanda Nuril, Ganden, and Dimas Projo	Titi Kamal
5.	"Selalu Ada" ("Always There")		Titi Kamal
6.	"Buronan Cinta" ("Love's Fugitive")		Titi Kamal
7.	"Dangdutkah Kita" ("Are We Dangdut")		Titi Kamal
8.	"Masa Remaja" (Adeudeuh Kakang)		Titi Kamal
9.	"Jablai (remix)"
10.	"Dongeng Klasik" ("Classic Fairytale")		The Mon’s

== Awards ==
Mendadak Dangdut was nominated for seven Citra Awards at the 2006 Indonesian Film Festival, winning one. At the 2007 Bandung Film Festival, the film won two awards, while at the 2007 Indonesian Movie Awards it won seven Golden Screens. For her work in the film, Kamal won Best Contemporary Solo Dangdut Singer at the 2007 Anugerah Musik Indonesia for dangdut.

Award	Year	Category	Recipient	Result
Indonesian Film Festival	2006	Best Film		Nominated
Indonesian Film Festival	2006	Best Script	Monty Tiwa	Nominated
Indonesian Film Festival	2006	Best Sound Arrangement	Adityawan Susanto, Trisno	Nominated
Indonesian Film Festival	2006	Best Musical Arrangement	Andi Rianto	Nominated
Indonesian Film Festival	2006	Best Leading Actor	Dwi Sasono	Nominated
Indonesian Film Festival	2006	Best Leading Actress	Titi Kamal	Nominated
Indonesian Film Festival	2006	Best Supporting Actress	Kinaryosih	Won
Bandung Film Festival	2007	Best Music	Andi Rianto	Won
Bandung Film Festival	2007	Best Supporting Actress	Kinaryosih	Won
Indonesian Movie Awards	2007	Favourite Film		Won
Indonesian Movie Awards	2007	Favourite Supporting Actor	Dwi Sasono	Won
Indonesian Movie Awards	2007	Best Supporting Actress	Kinaryosih	Won
Indonesian Movie Awards	2007	Favourite Supporting Actress	Kinaryosih	Won
Indonesian Movie Awards	2007	Best Pair	Titi Kamal and Kinaryosih	Won
Indonesian Movie Awards	2007	Favourite Pair	Titi Kamal and Kinaryosih	Won
Indonesian Movie Awards	2007	Special Award for Best Singing Actor/Actress	Titi Kamal	Won
