= Ipar adalah Maut the Series =

Indonesian drama television series

- Also known as: My Sister's Husband
- Genre: Drama
- Created by: Manoj Punjabi
- Based on: Ipar adalah Maut by Eliza Sifa
- Written by: Eliza Sifa
- Screenplay by: Tisa T. S.
- Directed by: Hanung Bramantyo; Sanjeev Kumar
- Starring: Deva Mahenra; Tatjana Saphira; Nicole Parham; Lian Firman; Josephine Firmstone; Aditya Novika; Rizky Fachrel; Fanny Fadillah; Herichan; Audi Marissa; Miqdad Addausy
- Theme music composer: Melly Goeslaw
- Opening theme: "Tak Pantas", Mytha Lestari
- Ending theme: "Tak Pantas", Mytha Lestari
- Composer: Gambara Music
- Country of origin: Indonesia
- Original language: Indonesian
- No. of seasons: 1
- No. of episodes: 45

Production
- Executive producer: Shania Punjabi
- Producer: Manoj Punjabi
- Cinematography: Welly Djuanda
- Camera setup: Multi-camera
- Running time: 60 minutes
- Production company: MD Entertainment

Original release
- Network: MDTV; Netflix
- Release: 3 November – 15 December 2025

Ipar adalah Maut the Series (transl. My Sister's Husband) is an Indonesian television series that aired from 3 November 2025 to 15 December 2025 on MDTV and Netflix. Produced by Manoj Punjabi under MD Entertainment. It is an adaptation 2024 film's Ipar adalah Maut, and starring Deva Mahenra, Tatjana Saphira, and Nicole Parham.

== Plot ==
Aris and Nisa are a young couple newly married and have a daughter.

The small family grows happily, with Aris's affection as a responsible husband and father, and his religious understanding of his family.

This happiness turns out to be short-lived, however, when temptation and betrayal enter their marriage.

Aris secretly engages in an illicit relationship with his own sister-in-law, Rani. This begins when Rani moves in with Aris and Nisa to continue her college studies.

What initially begins as casual glances and stealing time together quickly escalates into a dangerous affair that destroys not only Aris's marriage to Nisa, but also the sisters' family ties.

== Cast ==
- Tatjana Saphira as Anisa Nazafarin
- Deva Mahenra as Aris Nasyid Baihaqi
- Nicole Parham as Rani Nurul Azizah
- Alesha Fadillah as Raya Baihaqi
- Sonia Alyssa as Manda Cantika Saputri
- Lian Firman as Erwin
- Ayu Dyah Pasha as Fatimah
- Ivanka Suwandi as Hanum
- Shan Ryadi as Yusuf
- Rizky Fachrel as Yudi
- Imran Ismail as Hadi
- Josephine Firmstone as Intan
- Fanny Fadillah as Junaedi Prawito
- Amel Carla as Dewi
- Axel Mariani as Axel
- Toby Armstrong as Toby
- Putri Sulistiawati as Tari
- Diva Ratu Alifia as Dina
- Aditya Novika as Rohmah
- Luthfi Firnanda as Luthfi
- Erry Soekardi as Bibi
- Stefanie Hariadi as Sekar
- Heri Chan as Alex Carlos
- Audi Marissa as Jihan Nur Lestari
- Miqdad Addausy as Farhan Widjanarko

== Production ==
=== Casting ===
Tatjana Saphira were confirmed to play female lead, Nisa. Deva Mahenra also confirmed to play male lead, Aris.
