= Maaf, Saya Menghamili Istri Anda =

- Film poster
- Directed by: Monty Tiwa
- Written by: Monty Tiwa
- Produced by: Leo Sutanto; Rudi Soedjarwo; Novi Christina
- Starring: Ringgo Agus Rachman; Mulan Kwok; Shanty; Eddie Karsito
- Cinematography: Otoy Witoyo; Ivan Nugroho; Kiky Sewoyo; Ogie Hameh; Gita Nasution
- Edited by: Monty Tiwa; Cindy Robertha A. Biere
- Music by: Yogi Arifiandy
- Distributed by: Sinemart
- Release date: 21 June 2007
- Running time: 106 minutes
- Country: Indonesia
- Language: Indonesian

Maaf, Saya Menghamili Istri Anda (Sorry, I've Impregnated Your Wife) is a 2007 Indonesia film written and directed by Monty Tiwa.

The film was banned in Makassar as immoral.

== Plot ==
Maaf, Saya Menghamili Istri Anda is an Indonesian comedy movie. Dibyo is an unemployed actor that obsesses to become a famous actor. He plays in a film, but only as an extra. He also has bad luck with his relationship. His bad luck is changed when he meets Mira, a pretty girl that evidently really likes his style and humor. Their relationship results in Mira becoming pregnant. Mira asked Dibyo to be responsible for the baby. Dibyo is happy and agrees to marry Mira, because finally he has good reason for marrying his sweetheart. However, Mira was still being tied down as someone else's wife, although they are separating the bed.

== Cast ==
- Ringgo Agus Rachman
- Mulan Kwok
- Shanty
- Eddie Karsito
