= Istiqomah Cinta =

2026 Indonesian television series

- Genre: Family drama; Religion
- Screenplay by: Ashvery Kumar; Dimas Alimurdoko
- Story by: Ashvery Kumar; Dimas Alimurdoko
- Directed by: Bobby Herlambang
- Starring: Yasmin Napper; Arbani Yasiz; Cakrawala Airawan; Anjani Dina; Teuku Ryan
- Opening theme: "Dalam Sujudku" - Intan Ayu
- Ending theme: "Dalam Sujudku" - Intan Ayu
- Composer: Yoga Music Arranger
- Country of origin: Indonesia
- Original language: Indonesian
- No. of seasons: 1
- No. of episodes: 145

Production
- Executive producer: David S. Suwarto
- Producer: Sridhar Jetty
- Cinematography: Van Bomen
- Camera setup: Multi-camera
- Production company: Ess Jay Studios

Original release
- Network: SCTV
- Release: 9 February – 5 July 2026

Istiqomah Cinta is an Indonesian television series produced by Ess Jay Studios which aired from 9 February 2026 to 5 July 2026 on SCTV and streams on Vidio. It stars Yasmin Napper, and Arbani Yasiz.

== Plot ==
Khansa lives her life behind bars with sincerity. She strives to do positive things while incarcerated, such as teaching the Quran, helping fellow inmates, and upholding humanitarian values.

Behind her five-year prison sentence, Khansa is not the true perpetrator. She sacrificed herself to cover up the mistakes of Monika, Khansa's half-sister, who hit Aryani, Emran's girlfriend.

Khansa made this sacrifice to repay her foster family, even though it meant leaving her lover, Fathan. On the day of her release, Khansa must face the bitter reality of losing her foster mother. Furthermore, Khansa is also unaware of Fathan's whereabouts. Meanwhile, Fathan, who has returned to Indonesia, is also unable to see Khansa because Monika's family members are hiding his whereabouts. Monika's extended family actually encourages Fathan to get engaged to Monika because of Khansa's unknown whereabouts. Despite the hardship, Fathan accepts the plan. One day, Khansa is involved in an accident and is left in critical condition. Emran, witnessing the incident, tries to help Khansa and takes her to the hospital. Khansa is treated by a doctor named Aksan until she recovers.

Seeing Khansa's determination, Aksan is moved to give her a job and a place to stay. After Khansa moves in with Aksan's family, new conflicts continue to arise. Emran tries to get closer to Khansa to vent his revenge for the tragedy five years ago. But slowly, Emran begins to soften to Khansa's tender heart. Meanwhile, Fathan, who works at the hospital with Dr. Aksan, rediscovers pieces of the truth from the past that caused Khansa to distance herself from him. A major secret remains hidden, despite the strong intuition that suggests a strong bond between Dr. Aksan and Khansa.

== Cast ==
- Yasmin Napper as Khansa Arumi
- Arbani Yasiz as Fathan Saputra
- Tatjana Saphira as Dr. Alika Wardhani
- Anjani Dina as Monika Lazuardi
- Cakrawala Airawan as Emran Syailendra
- Teuku Ryan as Oscar
- Martha Alicya as Funny Aurelia Pradipta
- Dini Hanipahm as Ariyani
- Raslinna Rasidin as Hutami
- Dicky Wahyudi as Yudha
- Sisca Magdalena as Elva
- Krisna Murti as Darto
- Mira Asmara as Rara
- Adjie Pangestu as Dr. Akhsan Pradipta
- Ivanka Suwandi as Linda
- Merry Mustaf as Inggit
- Dolly Martin as Dody
- Eksanti as Rianti
- Yati Surachman as Sekar
- Nadya Yasmien as Rossi
- Diandra Salsabila as Amel: Maudy's daughter
- Firstriana Aldila as Maudy: Amel's mother
- Karlina Inawati as ibu Puspa
- Vidya Ully as Kayla
- Djihan Ranti as Puspa
- Lilis Suganda as Mumun
- Dea Lestari as Trisa
- Ivonne Dahler as Vira
- Duway as Arga
- Lenny Charlotte as Yayu
- Emma Warokka as Anggun
- Chantiq Schagerl as Vionika Larasati
- Kevin Kahuni as Yogi
- Intan RJ as Rani
- Molly Three Ocviany as Siska
- Rionaldo Stockhorst as Rangga
- Icha Nabilah as Nadia
- Ilyas Bachtiar as Pasha
- Mayang Yudittia as Santi
