= Khouri =

Khoury (Arabic: خوري or Ḫūrī), also transliterated as Khouri, is a surname that is found among Arab Christians in the Middle East, particularly in the countries of the Levant (Syria, Lebanon, Jordan, Palestine). The term khoury means "priest" in Levantine Arabic; it derives from the Latin word curia, or may come from the French curé meaning parish priest, from Latin curatus "one responsible for the care (of souls)," ultimately from curatus, past participle of curare "to take care of".

The name may also be spelled as El Khouri, El Khoury, Elcure, Khoory, Elkhori, Elkouri, Kouri, Couri, Koury, Coury, Kourie, Koory, Koorey, Kuri, Khuri, Khury, Kury, Xouri, Curi, Cury, Coorey, Courey, Korey, Kory, Corey, Chory, Correy and in Latin America as Xuri, Kure, Cure, Correa, Juri, Jury, Cura, Jure, Eljure, Menjura, Menjure, Menjuren, Aljure and Alcuri.

Notable people with the surname include:

== A−H ==
- Adam Kury, bassist for American rock band Candlebox
- Albert Eli Coury, known as Al Coury (1934–2013), Lebanese American record company executive
- Amin Khoury, founder of B/E Aerospace
- Ana Khouri (born 1981), Brazilian jewelry designer and sculptor
- Andrée Saab Khoury, known as Andrée Chedid, French Lebanese poet and novelist
- Augusto Cury, Lebanese Brazilian neuroscientist
- Bechara El Khoury (1890–1964), first post-independence president of Lebanon
- Bechara El Khoury (1957), Franco-Lebanese composer
- Brian Cury, founder and CEO of Earthcam
- Callie Khouri, Lebanese American Academy Award winner for writing the film Thelma & Louise
- Carlos Cure, Lebanese Colombian businessman
- Clara Khoury, Israeli actress
- Colette Khoury (1931–2026), Syrian novelist and poet
- Donald Kouri, American physicist
- Elias James Corey, Lebanese American organic chemist, won Nobel Prize in Chemistry in 1990
- Elias Khoury, Lebanese novelist, journalist, and academic
- Elias Khoury (lawyer), Israeli lawyer
- Elissar Zakaria Khoury, known as Elissa (singer), Lebanese singer
- Elizabeth Khuri, co-founder of social website Goodreads
- Emile Kuri, Lebanese Mexican film director
- Fadlo R. Khuri, former chair at Emory University School of Medicine
- Faris al-Khoury, Syrian politician, former prime minister of Syria
- Fred Coury, drummer for American glam metal band Cinderella
- Frederick Koury, founder of City-As-School High School
- Fuad Jorge Jury, known as Leonardo Favio, Syrian-Lebanese Argentine film director
- Fuad Khuri, Lebanese anthropologist
- George Khoury (author), writer in the field of comic books
- George Khoury, molecular biologist and chief of the molecular virology laboratory at the National Cancer Institute
- George Khoury, co-author and composer of No. 1 hit song "Sea of Love"
- Giselle Khoury, Lebanese journalist
- Greg Kouri, Lebanese Canadian co-founder of Zip2.com and X.com and high tech angel investor
- Gui Khury, Brazilian skateboarder, youngest person to win a gold medal at the X-Games
- Herbert Khaury, known as Tiny Tim (musician) (1932–1996), American musician
- Huguette Khoury, known as Huguette Caland, French Lebanese painter
- Humberto Curi, an Argentine-born Olympic boxer who competed in the middleweight class in the 1928 Summer Olympics in Amsterdam

== I–Z ==
- Jessica Khoury, American writer of middle grade and young adult literature
- Joanne Chory, Lebanese American molecular biologist and geneticist
- Joelle Khoury, Lebanese pianist, jazz and contemporary classical music composer
- Joseph S. Koury, Lebanese American real state developer, Koury Corporation
- Jowy Khoury, Lebanese actress
- Joyce El-Khoury, Lebanese-Canadian operatic soprano
- Justin Khoury, Lebanese American physicist and cosmology researcher who introduced the ekpyrotic universe
- Karyn Khoury, American award-winning perfumer
- Katheryn Curi, American racing cyclist
- Ken Khouri, Lebanese Jamaican record company owner
- Makram Khoury, Israeli actor
- Mario El-Khoury, Lebanese-Swiss engineer and business executive
- Marwan Khoury, Lebanese singer, writer and composer
- Maurice J Koury, textile businessman and philanthropist
- Michael Khouri, former chairman of the US Federal Maritime Commission
- Muin J. Khoury, American geneticist and epidemiologist
- Pablo Kuri-Morales, Lebanese Mexican world health expert in pandemics
- Paul Khoury, Australian television personality and leading TV Host in the poker arena
- Philip S. Khoury, American historian
- Philip Khuri Hitti, Historian and professor at Harvard University
- Pilar Khoury, Lebanese footballer
- Rabeeh Khoury, Israeli entrepreneur, founder of SolidRun
- Rami George Khouri, Palestinian-Jordanian American journalist and editor
- Raymond Khoury, Lebanese screenwriter and novelist
- Sahar Khoury, American visual artist, sculptor
- Said Khoury, Palestinian-Lebanese businessman and founder of Consolidated Contractors Company (CCC)
- Sari Ibrahim Khoury, Palestinian abstract visual artist
- Shirine Khoury-Haq, British-Lebanese CEO of The Co-operative Group
- Sylvia Khoury, American writer and playwright, Pulitzer prize finalist
- Theodore Khoury, Lebanese-born German Catholic theologian
- Vénus Khoury-Ghata (1937–2026), Lebanese-French poet and writer
- Victor Khoury, Lebanese general and defense minister
- Walter Hugo Khouri, Brazilian film director and producer
- Yara Khoury-Mikhael, Miss Lebanon 2011
- Yusuf Al-Khuri, ninth-century translator and mathematician
- Zahi Khouri, Palestinian-American businessman
