= Dwi Sasono =

Indonesian actor of Javanese descent (born 1980)

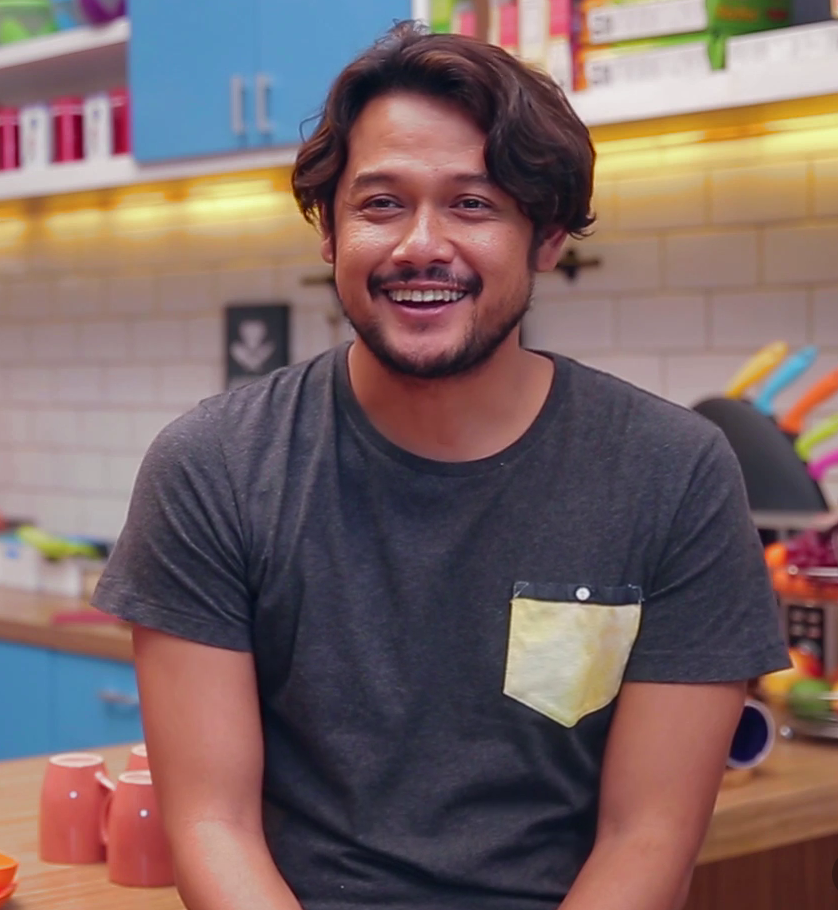
- Born: Dwi Sasono; 30 March 1980 (age 46); Surabaya, East Java, Indonesia
- Occupation: Actor
- Years active: 2006–present
- Spouse: Widi Mulia (m. 2007)
- Children: Dru Prawiro Sasono; Widuri Putri Sasono; Den Bagus Satrio Sasono

Dwi Sasono (born in Surabaya, East Java, Indonesia on 30 March 1980) is an Indonesian actor of Javanese descent. He is the husband of Indonesian actress and singer, Widi Mulia.

== Career ==
Sasono's acting career, and his nickname, began with the role of Rizal in the film Mendadak Dangdut (2006) directed by Rudi Soedjarwo.

After Mendadak Dangdut, Sasono appeared in Pocong 2 (2006), Mengejar Mas Mas (2007), and Otomatis Romantis (2008).

At the 2007 MTV Indonesia Movie Awards, Sasono received three nominations: Most Favorite Actor (Mengejar Mas Mas), Most Favorite Supporting Actor (Pocong 2), and Breakthrough Actor/Actress (Mengejar Mas-Mas).

== 2020 Marijuana Arrest ==
Sasono was arrested on 26 May 2020 at his residence in Pondok Labu, South Jakarta, after allegedly purchasing marijuana from a drug dealer. Police searched Sasono's house and found 16 grams of marijuana in a cabinet. Police said he tested positive to marijuana. Sasono on 1 June said he was a "victim" because he was only an addicted user and not a dealer.

Sasono told police he used marijuana to fill in time and overcome insomnia while self-isolating at his home during the COVID-19 pandemic. His legal team requested he be allowed to undergo rehabilitation, rather than be put on trial for illegal drug possession and consumption.

== Filmography ==
Year	Title	Role	Notes
2006	Mendadak Dangdut	Rizal	Nominations Citra Award for Best Leading Actor in Indonesian Film Festival 2006; Favorite Supporting Role Actor in Indonesian Movie Awards 2007
2006	Pocong 2	Wisnu	Nominations Most Favorite Supporting Actor in MTV Indonesia Movie Awards 2007
2007	Mengejar Mas Mas	Suparno / Mrs. Parno	Nominations Most Favorite Actor in MTV Indonesia Movie Awards 2007; Nominations Breakthrough Actor/Actress in MTV Indonesia Movie Awards 2007; Nominations Citra Award for Best Leading Actor in Indonesian Film Festival 2007
2008	Otomatis Romantis	Trisno	Nominations Citra Award for Best Supporting Actor in Indonesian Film Festival 2008
2008	D.O – Drop Out	David / Si Germo	
2008	Under The Tree	Unknown Role	
2008	Lastri	Unknown Role	
2008	Drupadi	Yudhistira	
2009	Kalau Cinta Jangan Cengeng	Ahmad	
2009	Wakil Rakyat	Dani	Best Supporting Role Actor in Indonesian Movie Awards 2009
2009	Jamila dan Sang Presiden	Ibrahim	
2009	Capres	Hartono, SE.	
2009	Kata Maaf Terakhir	Unknown Role	
2009	XXL-Double Extra Large	Soemanto	
2010	The God Babe	Ojan	
2010	Istri Bo'ongan	Arya	
2010	Laskar Pemimpi	Kopral Jono	Nominations Best Supporting Role Actor in Bandung Film Festival 2011
2011	Belkibolang	Unknown Role	
2011	Get Married 3	Handyman Mopping Hospital	
2012	Sampai Ujung Dunia	Daud	
2012	Test Pack	Heru	
2012	Jakarta Hati	Unknown Role	Nominations Omnibus Best Actor in Maya Cup 2012
2013	Rectoverso	Panca	Segment: "Firasat"
2013	Romantini	Driver	
2013	Hati Ke Hati	Salep	
2014	Yasmine	Unknown Role	
2014	Aku, Kau & KUA	Kak Emil	
2016	Firegate	Guntur Samudra	
2019	Mecca I'm Coming	Pietoyo	
2022	Stealing Raden Saleh	Budiman Subiakto	
2023	Andragogy	Didit	

== Sitcom ==
Year	Title	Role
2014	Tetangga Masa Gitu?	Adi Putranto
2014	pernikahan dini?	Adi Putranto

== Awards and nominations ==
Year	Awards	Category	Film	Results
2006	Indonesian Film Festival	Citra Award for Best Leading Actor	Mendadak Dangdut	Nominated
2007	Indonesian Film Festival	Citra Award for Best Leading Actor	Mengejar Mas Mas	Nominated
2007	Indonesian Movie Awards	Favorite Supporting Role Actor	Mendadak Dangdut	Won
2007	MTV Indonesia Movie Awards	Most Favorite Actor	Mengejar Mas Mas	Nominated
2007	MTV Indonesia Movie Awards	Breakthrough Actor/Actress	Mengejar Mas Mas	Nominated
2007	MTV Indonesia Movie Awards	Most Favorite Supporting Actor	Pocong 2	Nominated
2008	Indonesian Film Festival	Citra Award for Best Supporting Actor	Otomatis Romantis	Nominated
2009	Indonesian Movie Awards	Best Leading Role Actor	Wakil Rakyat	Won
2011	Bandung Film Festival	Best Supporting Role Actor	Laskar Pemimpi	Nominated
2012	Maya Award	Best Actor in an Omnibus	Jakarta Hati	Nominated
