= Kevin Julio =

Indonesian actor, presenter and singer

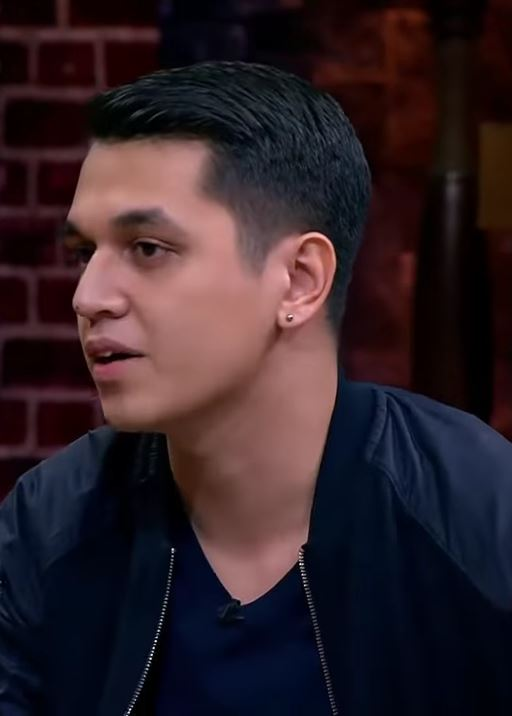
- Kevin Julio in 2017
- Born: Kevin Julio Chandra; July 28, 1993 (age 33); Jakarta, Indonesia
- Occupations: Presenter, singer
- Years active: 2006–present

Kevin Julio Chandra (born in Jakarta, on 28 July 1993), better known as Kevin Julio is an Indonesian actor, presenter and singer of mixed Dutch and Sundanese descent.

== Early life ==
Kevin Julio was born on 28 July 1993, in Jakarta. He is the only child of Asep Candra Himawan and Nancy Wijaya. His father is Sundanese while his mother is of Dutch descent

== Career ==
Kevin Julio started his film career as supporting roles in Basah... (2006), Menculik Miyabi (2010) and Bangun Lagi Dong Lupus (2013). His first leading role was in the Kembalinya Nenek Gayung (2013) and Adriana (2013). In 2016 he was cast as villain in the Comedy-superhero Jagoan Instan.

In 2013, he started his presenting career by co-hosting along with Olga Syahputra and Raffi Ahmad in the music program Dahsyat. In 2016, he hosting a new talent search or television show formed by FremantleMedia (now Fremantle) with NET., in between of Just Duet and Ini Dia! (Indonesian version of Thank God You're Here).

As an actor, he has earned Bandung Film Festival for Excellence Actor in a Lead Role (Television) in 2014, and has been nominated for SCTV Awards, Indonesia Kids Choice Awards, Infotainment Awards, and Insert Fashion Awards.

=== 2006 – 2011: Debut television and film ===
Kevin Julio started his acting career as supporting role in Indonesian soap opera "Intan" in 2016. He started his acting career as supporting role and starred in several television including "Heart Series" (2007), "Candy"(2007). In 2011 he starred in "Arti Sahabat", which made him an idol.

Kevin Julio started his film career as supporting roles in "Basah..." (Wet...) (2006), "Menculik Miyabi" (Kidnapping Miyabi)(2010)

=== 2012–present: Critical acclaim, debut presenting, and FTV ===
In 2013, he was cast in the second season of Heart Series, "Heart Series 2". His first leading role was in the "Bidadari-Bidadari Surga" (Heaven Angels) (2013). He received critical acclaimed with his role as Tristan in Ganteng-Ganteng Serigala (Handsome Wolves) (2014) In 2015, GGS back with it second season titled, Ganteng-Ganteng Serigala (Returns), it set earlier before first season. Kevin Julio and all main casts left the show because the production changed it whole story, but he then called back him for the last episode.

In 2013, while on a break from television series, Kevin Julio starred in numerous film television including Rute Cinta No. 23 which has nominated in Panasonic Gobel Awards 2015.

While he was on a break from television activity he was cast on Bangun Lagi Dong Lupus (2013) as supporting role Daniel, Acha Septriasa boyfriend, but due to his rude character toward Lupus her girlfriend left him. His first leading role was in the horror-comedy film Kembalinya Nenek Gayung (Nenek Gayung is Back) (2013) as Brandon. A popular actor who is tried to get his popularity back in alternative way. Then he starred in a historical-fiction film, Adriana (2013), as Sobar who is very serious person. In 2016, he was cast as villain in the comedy-superhero Jagoan Instan (Instant Hero), Romeo. Directed by Fajar Bustami, Jagoan Instan was filmed last year and released on 18 February. For this character he is uglified with false buck teeth. Due to tight scheduled he collapsed three times in one day during the shooting of this film.

In 2013, he started his presenting career by co-hosting along with Olga Syahputra and Raffi Ahmad in the music program Dahsyat. In 2016, he hosting a new Indonesian singing talent search produced by FremantleMedia with NET., "Just Duet" aired every Saturday and Sunday at 7:30 pm from 2 April – 22 May 2016.

On 2 August 2015, he along with Maia, PASTO, Jessica Mila and Prilly Latuconsina hold fan meeting in Jakarta Selatan to promoted their latest collaboration album, Maia Pasto with the Stars. He sung a duet track with PASTO, "Teman atau Kekasih" (Friend or Girlfriend) The official teaser of this track first published on 27 July 2015, by Le Mosiek Revole on YouTube

In November 2016, his film with Jessica Mila, Surga di Telapak Kaki Ibu (The Movie), was released. On 12 January 2017, Jomblo Ngenes, his second film with Jessica Mila was released. On 25 June 2017, Indonesian version of Miss Granny, Sweet 20, was released, starring Kevin Julio as Juna.

== Filmography ==
=== Films ===
| Year | Title | Role |
|---|---|---|
| 2008 | Basahhh... | Alvin |
| 2010 | Menculik Miyabi | Bimo |
| 2013 | Bangun Lagi Dong Lupus | Daniel |
| 2013 | Kembalinya Nenek Gayung | Brandon |
| 2013 | Adriana | Sobar |
| 2014 | Marmut Merah Jambu | Leader of Silat Extra Curiculer (Cameo) |
| 2016 | Jagoan Instan | Romeo |
| 2016 | Surga Di Telapak Kaki Ibu The Movie | Amri |
| 2017 | Jomblo Ngenes | Noval |
| 2017 | Sweet 20 | Juna |
| 2021 | Kadet 1947 | Mulyono |
| 2022 | Like & Share | Ario |
| 2025 | The Most Beautiful Girl in the World | |
| 2026 | The Sea Speaks His Name | Daniel Tumbuan |

=== Television ===
==== Dramas ====
| Year | Title | Role |
|---|---|---|
| 2006 | Intan | Kevin |
| 2007 | Heart Series | Young Boby |
| 2007 | Intan | Kevin |
| 2007 | Candy | Aldy |
| 2007 | Sentuh Hatiku | |
| 2007 | Juwita Jadi Putri | Ryo |
| 2008 | Sekar | Kevin |
| 2008 | Namaku Mentari | Diste |
| 2009 | Nikita | Choki |
| 2009 | Putih Merah | Andra |
| 2009 | Dewi | Sakti |
| 2009 | Cinta dan Anugerah | |
| 2009 | Kejora dan Bintang | |
| 2009 | Embun | |
| 2010 | Arti Sahabat | Fathir |
| 2010 | Arti Sahabat Season 2 | Fathir |
| 2010 | Buku Harian Baim | Bayu |
| 2012 | Yusra dan Yumna | Julio |
| 2012 | Yang Muda Yang Bercinta | Ronzi |
| 2013 | Bukan Mawar Tapi Melati | |
| 2013 | Heart Series 2 | Boy |
| 2013 | Bidadari – Bidadari Surga | Dalimunte |
| 2014 | Ganteng - Ganteng Serigala | Tristan |
| 2015 | Ganteng - Ganteng Serigala Returns | Tristan |
| 2019 | Jodoh Wasiat Bapak | Tommy |

==== Television films ====
- Cewek Super Lelet (2008) as Aruna
- Kacamata Kuda Buat Uda (2008) as Uda
- Rute Cinta No. 23 as Adit
- Rebutan Pembantu Cantik as Ardi
- Dikejar Argo Cinta as Adit
- Roro Jonggrang Millenium
- Labil Ekonomi Bikin Jatuh Cinta (2013) as Rianto
- Tabrakan 2 Hati (2014) as Tommy
- Tak Ada Babysitter Supir Pun Jadi (2014) as Ciko
- Kepepet Cinta Cowok Jetset (2014) as Johan
- Cewek Jadul Bikin Happy (2014) as Reni
- Cintaku Dikoploin Kamu
- Tukang Babat Rumput Jatuh Cinta
- Hansip Super Tajir

== Collaborations ==
| Year | Information | Tracks contributed | Artist(s) |
|---|---|---|---|
| 2015 | Maia Pasto with the Stars: Artist: Maia and Pasto; Released: Augustus 2, 2015 | 5. Teman atau Kekasih | Kevin Julio |

== Commercial film ==
- Caviplex Junior
- Oppo (2014) (with Jessica Mila)
- ALBA Watch Indonesia (2016)

== Presenter ==
- Dahsyat
- Just Duet
- Ini Dia!
- Pesta Sahabat Cinta Indonesia (id:)

== Awards and nominations ==
| Year | Awards | Category | Nominated work | Result |
|---|---|---|---|---|
| 2014 | Festival Film Bandung | Excellence Actor in a Lead Role (Television) | Bidadari – bidadari Surga | Won |
| 2014 | SCTV Awards | Popular Actor | Ganteng – Ganteng Serigala | Nominated |
| 2015 | Indonesia Kids Choice Awards | Best Actor | Ganteng – Ganteng Serigala | Nominated |
| 2015 | Infotainment Awards | Selebriti Pria Paling Memikat | himself | Nominated |
| 2015 | Infotainment Awards | Most Fashionable Celebrity – Male | himself | Nominated |
| 2015 | Infotainment Awards | Celebrity of The Year | himself | Nominated |
| 2015 | Infotainment Awards | Most Exist Celebrity on Social Media | himself | Nominated |
| 2015 | SCTV Awards | Popular Actor | Ganteng – Ganteng Serigala Returns | Nominated |
| 2016 | Infotainment Awards | Most Fashionable Celebrity – Male | himself | Nominated |
