= Hidayah (film) =

- Poster
- Directed by: Monty Tiwa
- Written by: Baskoro Adi Wuryanto
- Produced by: Rajesh Punjabi
- Starring: Ajil Ditto; Givina; Alif Joerg; Unique Priscilla; Khiva Iskak
- Cinematography: Jimmy Fajar
- Edited by: Wawan I. Wibowo
- Music by: Andi Rianto
- Production companies: Pichouse Films; Clock Work Films
- Distributed by: MD Pictures
- Release date: 12 January 2023
- Country: Indonesia
- Language: Indonesian

Hidayah is a 2023 Indonesian horror film directed by Monty Tiwa and produced by Rajesh Punjabi with the production company of Pichouse Films and Clockwork Films. It is based on the 2005 television series of the same name.

== Cast ==
- Ajil Ditto as Bahri
- Givina as Ratna
- Alif Joerg as Hasan
- Unique Priscilla as Hesti
- Khiva Iskak as Burhan
- Dewi Yull as Umi
- Joshua Pandelaki as Kyai Fatah
- Fanny Ghassani as Yanti
- Revaldo as the workshop owner
- Nagra Kautsar as Gilang
- Ridwan Kainan as Asep
- Baby Niken as Burhan's wife
- Ami Asrizal Tankot as Dadang
- Cley Nuary as Lisa
- Kakang Arda as Mamat

== Release ==
Hidayah officially premiered in Indonesian cinemas on January 12, 2023. The theatrical release was accompanied by promotional events featuring the cast, who highlighted the film's core themes regarding spiritual faith and warnings against supernatural convergence.

== Reception ==
=== Critical response ===
Rafifa Shabira of IDN Times rated the film 8 out of 10, praising its tense atmosphere and ability to build suspense gradually without relying heavily on jump scares. Shabira noted that while the film adapts a popular television series, it offers a thematic twist; instead of focusing solely on the victim receiving divine guidance (hidayah), the narrative emphasizes the spiritual journey and self-reckoning of the young cleric, Bahri. Galih Dea of Cultura rated the film 3 out of 5 and gave the film a mixed review, criticizing its grounded plot and unmemorable cast performances for turning the movie into a generic horror flick with an overly preachy delivery. However, Dea praised director Monty Tiwa's ability to build a slow-burn eerie atmosphere during the first half through effective camera work and scoring, while highlighting Givina's performance as Ratna for delivering genuine terror.
