= Mengejar Mas-Mas =

2007 film by Rudy Soedjarwo

- Film poster
- Directed by: Rudy Soedjarwo
- Written by: Monty Tiwa
- Produced by: Lala Hamid
- Starring: Dina Olivia; Poppy Sovia; Dwi Sasono; Elmayana Sabrenia; Roy Marten; Ira Wibowo
- Cinematography: Edi Michael Santoso
- Edited by: Monty Tiwa; Cindy Robertha A. Biere
- Production company: PT Depic Media Cipta
- Release date: 24 May 2007
- Running time: 99 minutes
- Country: Indonesia
- Language: Indonesian

Mengejar Mas-Mas is a 2007 Indonesian comedy drama film directed by Rudy Soedjarwo and written by Monty Tiwa.

== Synopsis ==
Mengejar Mas-Mas is an Indonesia drama comedy movie. Shanaz (Poppy Sovia) felt guilty for her father's death. Her relationship with her mother disharmonize, and things get worse when her mother decides to marry her boyfriend within 8 months since her father died. Disappointed, Shanaz runs away to Jogjakarta to follow her boyfriend Mika, but she lost contact with him. With no money, she has been strayed to Pasar Kembang (Sarkem), the worst localization in Jogjakarta. She meets Ningsih (Dina Olivia), a prostitute who saves her from a bad guy. Ningsih lets Shanaz stays with her, and they get close. Then Shanaz meet Parno (Dwi Sasono), Ningsih's former boyfriend. They often spend their time together during Ningsih absence for "work". Even he is 20 years older than Shanaz, Parno's crushed to Shanaz's heart. Shanaz secretly falls in love with him, but Ningsih and Parno still care for each other.

== Cast ==
- Dina Olivia
- Poppy Sovia
- Dwi Sasono
- Roy Marten
- Ira Wibowo
