= Monty Tiwa =

Indonesian film director

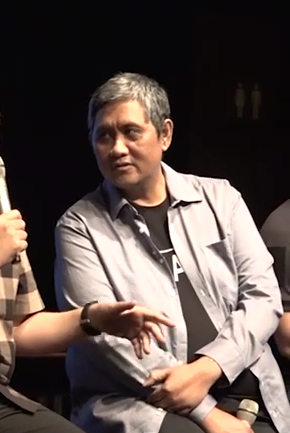
Monty Tiwa at 6th Police Movie Festival

Monty Tiwa (born 28 August 1976 in Jakarta) is an Indonesian screenwriter, composer, film editor, film producer and film director. Monty Tiwa enrolled in University of Kansas before he returned to Indonesia and worked as creative writer for Trans TV (2002–2003), head section creative for RCTI (2003–2004) and creative director for MNC (2004–2005).

Currently, Monty works as an independent writer and film director.

== Filmography ==
- Maaf, Saya Telah Menghamili Istri Anda (2007) - director / writer
- Pocong 3 (2007) - director / writer
- XL Extra Large (2008) - director / writer
- Barbi3 (2008) - director
- Wakil Rakyat (2009) - director
- Homses A short film (2009) - director / writer / editor
- Keramat (2009) - director / writer
- Laskar Pemimpi (2010) - writer / editor / director
- XXL (2009) - writer/producer
- Andai Ia Tahu - writer
- Vina Bilang Cinta - writer
- Biarkan Bintang Menari - writer
- 9 Naga - writer
- Ujang Pantry - writer / editor
- Juli di bulan Juni - writer
- Mendadak Dangdut - writer
- Denias - writer
- Pocong 1 - writer
- Pocong 2 - writer / editor
- Dunia Mereka - writer
- Mengejar Mas-Mas - writer
- Otomatis Romantis - writer/producer
- Anak Setan - writer/producer
- Hidayah (2023) - director

== Other works ==
- Biarkan Bintang Menari - original soundtrack with Andi Rianto
- Mendadak Dangdut - original soundtrack with hits Jablay
- Indonesian Idol - theme song
- Dunia Mereka 1 & 2 - books

== Awards ==
- Best Screenwriter, Festival Film Indonesia 2005 for Juli di Bulan Juni
- Best Editor, Festival Film Indonesia 2006 for Ujang Pantry 2
- Best Screenwriter, Festival Film Indonesia 2006 for Denias
