= Kartini (film) =

- Directed by: Hanung Bramantyo
- Written by: Hanung Bramantyo; Bagus Bramanti
- Story by: Robert Ronny
- Produced by: Robert Ronny
- Starring: Dian Sastrowardoyo; Deddy Sutomo; Christine Hakim; Acha Septriasa; Ayushita; Reza Rahadian; Adinia Wirasti
- Cinematography: Faozan Rizal
- Edited by: Wawan I. Wibowo
- Music by: Andi Rianto
- Production companies: Legacy Pictures; Screenplay Films
- Distributed by: Legacy Pictures
- Release date: 21 April 2017
- Running time: 119 mins
- Country: Indonesia
- Languages: Javanese; Indonesian; Dutch
- Budget: Rp 12 billion (US$900,000)
- Box office: Rp 19 billion (US$1.42 million)

Kartini (subtitled Princess of Java in other regions) is a 2017 Indonesian biographical family drama film directed by Hanung Bramantyo and written by Bramantyo and Bagus Bramanti. It features an ensemble cast, with Dian Sastrowardoyo starring in the title role of Indonesian woman emancipation heroine, Kartini. Christine Hakim, Acha Septriasa, Ayushita, Adinia Wirasti, and Reza Rahadian co-stars in supporting roles.

Initially to be released on 2016, the film was delayed for a year. The film was released in Indonesia on 19 April 2017, two days before Kartini's day. Although being highly anticipated, the film performed below expectations gaining just over 500,000 viewers.

== Cast ==
- Dian Sastrowardoyo as R.A. Kartini
  - Neysa Chan as 6-year-old Kartini
  - Adelheid Bunga as 14-year-old Kartini
- Deddy Sutomo as Raden Mas Adipati Ario Sosroningrat, Kartini's father
- Christine Hakim as M.A. Ngasirah, Kartini's mother
  - Nova Eliza as Young M.A. Ngasirah
- Djenar Maesa Ayu as R.A. Moerjam, Kartini's step-mother
- Acha Septriasa as R.A. Roekmini, Kartini's half-sister
- Ayushita as R.A. Kardinah, Kartini's sister
- Reza Rahadian as R.M.P. Sosrokartono, Kartini's brother
- Adinia Wirasti as R.A. Soelastri, Kartini's half-sister
- Denny Sumargo as R.M. Slamet Sosroningrat, Kartini's brother
- Dwi Sasono as Raden Adipati Joyodiningrat, Kartini's husband
- Rianti Cartwright as the Dutch Queen Wilhelmina
- Hans de Kraker as Ovink-Soer
- Carmen van Rijnbach as Cecile de Jong
- Alinda Wit as Hilda van Suylenburg
- Rebecca Reijman as Stella Zeehandelaar

== Production ==
Kartini is the second film to be produced by Robert Ronny's Legacy Pictures. Hanung Bramantyo is the director and a co-writer since the beginning of the project with the help of Bagus Bramanti to write the screenplay and Robert Ronny himself got involved in a story development of the film.

The title role is played by a citra award winner, Dian Sastrowardoyo. Other actors and actresses joined the cast, including Christine Hakim as M.A. Ngasirah (Kartini's mother), Deddy Sutomo as R.M. Sosroningrat (Kartini's father), Djenar Maesa Ayu as R.A. Moeryam (Kartini's step mother), Acha Septriasa, Ayushita and Adinia Wirasti as Roekmini, Kardinah and Soelastri (Kartini's sisters), Reza Rahadian and Denny Sumargo as Sosrokartono and Slamet (Kartini's brothers), Dwi Sasono as Raden Joyodiningrat (Kartini's husband).

Hanung chose Dian, Ayushita, and Acha to portray the major roles mainly because of their popularity and charisma among Indonesian females, along with their concerns regarding women issues making them the perfect choices for the roles. According to Ronny, Dian is the first and only choice to portray the heroine, stating it would be hard to make the film had she not accepted the role.

== Release ==
Initially to be released on Kartini Day 2016, the film was delayed to December that year.

In July 2016, the film's release date was again pushed back to April 2017, to coincide with Kartini Day on 2017.

The film had its gala premiere on April 13, 2017, at Metropole XXI, Jakarta.

In March 2017, the film release date was moved two days ahead from its previous date to April 19, 2017. A trailer was first released on March 21, 2017.

== Reception ==
=== Box office ===
Kartini was viewed by 57,202 people on its first day. On its first week, the film gained 323,686 tickets sale. The film grossed Rp19 billion ($1.42 million) on its final day of screening.

Many attributed the film's lackluster performance to the lead star Dian Sastrowardoyo's recent viral video showing her dodging a fan who was forcefully grabbing her hand. She issued a public clarification through her Instagram account,. However, director Hanung Bramantyo defended the film's performance, stating that the number, while not impressive, is still doing well. He stated that it's still a good result for a biopic film considering that people tend to choose horror, comedy, or romantic drama at cinemas.
