= Kutunggu Kau Dipasar Minggu =

- Genre: Long Running Drama; Teenager
- Created by: SinemArt
- Written by: Lintang Wardani
- Directed by: Gita Asmara
- Starring: Nikita Willy; Giorgino Abraham; Winona Willy; Cut Meyriska; Cinta Laura; Fero Walandouw; Ade Surya Akbar; Atiq Rahman; Cut Mini Theo; Jaja Mihardja; Anjasmara; Paramitha Rusady
- Opening theme: Nonton Bioskop, Nikita Willy
- Ending theme: Nonton Bioskop, Nikita Willy
- Country of origin: Indonesia
- Original language: Indonesian
- No. of episodes: 67 (as January 13, 2013)

Production
- Executive producer: Elly Yanti Noor
- Producer: Leo sutanto
- Production location: Jakarta
- Running time: 1-hours
- Production company: SinemArt Production

Original release
- Network: RCTI
- Release: 5 November 2012 – 27 January 2013

Related
- Yang Masih Dibawah Umur

Kutunggu Kau Dipasar Minggu The Series (English:I'm Meet You in the Sunday Market The Series) is a soap opera that aired on RCTI in daily at 17:00–18:00 WIB, 18:00–19:00 WITA, and 19:00–20:00 WIT. This soap opera produced by SinemArt. Players such as Nikita Willy, Giorgino Abraham, Winona Willy, Cut Meyriska, Cinta Laura, and much more.

== Cast ==
- Nikita Willy as Niki Mihardja– Jaja and Mimin son
- Giorgino Abraham as Gio Gardian
- Winona Willy as Nona
- Cut Meyriska as Gia Gardian
- Cinta Laura as Karin Panggabean
- Fero Walandouw as Fero
- Ade Surya Akbar as Dennis
- Atiq Rachman as Rocky
- Jaja Mihardja as Jaja Mihardja
- Cut Mini Theo as Mimin
- Anjasmara as Mr. Ray Gardian
- Moudy Wilhelmina as Roseline Gardian
- Yadi Timo as Jaka
- Tenno Ali as Madun
- Iqbal Pakula as Surya
- Wiwid Gunawan as Rita Britha
- Dahlia Poland as Sandry
- Gritte Agatha as Ayuni
- Intan Shofi as Siti
- Ria Probo as Susan Suwing
- Iszur Muchtar as Mr. Sarip
- Shinta Muin as Mak Uti
- Dudun Arjuna as Sanip
- Aspar Paturuzi as Ustad
- Samuel Zylgwyn as Sam
- Paramitha Rusady as Sari
- Sinyo Rudi as Toto

== International broadcasts ==
Country	Channel	Language	Subtitle
Indonesia	RCTI	Indonesian	
Myanmar	Myanmar Television	Indonesian	Burmese
