= Firegate =

- Theatrical release poster
- Directed by: Rizal Mantovani
- Written by: Robert Ronny
- Produced by: Robert Ronny
- Starring: Reza Rahadian; Julie Estelle; Dwi Sasono; Ray Sahetapy
- Cinematography: Faozan Rizal
- Edited by: Ganda Harta
- Music by: Andi Rianto
- Production company: Legacy Pictures
- Distributed by: Legacy Pictures
- Release date: September 20, 2017
- Running time: 113 mins
- Country: Indonesia
- Language: Bahasa Indonesia

Firegate is a 2017 Indonesian adventure horror film about a mysterious pyramid in Gunung Padang. The film was produced and written by Robert Ronny and directed by Rizal Mantovani.

== Cast ==
- Reza Rahadian as Tomo Gunadi
- Julie Estelle as Arni Kumalasari
- Dwi Sasono as Guntur Samudra
- Ray Sahetapy as Theo Wirawan
- Reza Nangin
- Khiva Iskak
- Ayasha Putri
- Puy Brahmantya
