= Night Bus (2017 film) =

2017 film directed by Emil Heradi

- Film poster
- Directed by: Emil Heradi
- Written by: Rahabi Mandra; Teuku Rifnu Wikana
- Produced by: Darius Sinathrya; Teuku Rifnu Wikana
- Starring: Teuku Rifnu Wikana; Yayu AW Unru; Edward Akbar; Hana Prinantina; Laksmi Notokusumo; Torro Margens
- Cinematography: Anggi Frisca
- Production companies: Nightbus Pictures; Kaninga Pictures
- Release date: 6 April 2017
- Running time: 139 minutes
- Country: Indonesia
- Language: Indonesian

Night Bus is a 2017 Indonesian action thriller film directed by Emil Heradi. The film won six awards at the Indonesian Film Festival in 2017, including Best Feature Film.

== Plot ==
This film tells the story of a bus traveling to Sampar, a city known for its rich natural resources. The city is heavily guarded by a group of soldiers who are on standby against rebel militants who demand independence for their homeland. Each passenger on this bus has their own destination. At first they thought that this would be a trip to the conflicted area as usual, but without them knowing, there was an intruder with an important message that had to be conveyed to Sampar. This important message is said to be able to end the conflict. However, the presence of this intruder endangers all passengers as he is wanted by the two warring parties. The situation becomes increasingly tense when everyone has to fight for their lives. They also have to face other parties that do not want the conflict to end, namely the opportunists, the maintainers of conflict because they live off conflict. No one knows, who will die and who will stay alive.

== Production ==
Wanting to create a new nuance in the world of Indonesian cinema, Teuku Rifnu Wikana and Darius Sinathrya ventured to make a thriller genre film entitled Night Bus, which took the story of separatist and humanitarian conflicts. This film is an adaptation of the short story Selamat written by Teuku Rifnu Wikana. The short story Selamat was inspired by Rifnu's experience when he traveled to conflict areas.

== Accolades ==
Award	Year	Category	Recipient	Result
Indonesian Film Festival	2017	Best Director	Emil Heradi	Nominated
Indonesian Film Festival	2017	Best Cinematography	Anggi Frisca	Nominated
Indonesian Film Festival	2017	Best Visual Effects	Amrin Nugraha	Nominated
Indonesian Film Festival	2017	Best Sound Editing & Mixing	Wahyu Tri Purnomo, Jantra Suryaman	Nominated
Indonesian Film Festival	2017	Best Supporting Actor	Alex Abbad	Nominated
Indonesian Film Festival	2017	Best Makeup Stylist	Cherry Wirawan	Won
Indonesian Film Festival	2017	Best Clothing Stylists	Gemailla Gea Geriantiana	Won
Indonesian Film Festival	2017	Best Picture Editors	Kelvin Nugroho, Sentot Sahid	Won
Indonesian Film Festival	2017	Best Adapted Screenplay	Rahabi Mandra, Teuku Rifnu Wikana	Won
Indonesian Film Festival	2017	Best Lead Actor	Teuku Rifnu Wikana	Won
Indonesian Film Festival	2017	Best Film	Darius Sinathrya, Teuku Rifnu Wikana	Won
Bandung Film Festival	2017	Editing	Kelvin Nugroho, Sentot Sahid	Won
Jogja-NETPAC Asian Film Festival	2017	Jaff Indonesia Screen Awards		Nominated
