= Rudy Soedjarwo =

Indonesian film director (born 1971)

Rudy Soedjarwo (born 1971) is an Indonesian film director. He became popular after he directed the teen movie, What's Up with Love? (2002).

== Filmography ==
- Falling Star (Bintang Jatuh) (2000)
- Tragedy (Tragedi) (2001)
- What's Up with Love? (Ada Apa dengan Cinta?) (2002)
- Chasing the Sun (Mengejar Matahari) (2004)
- About Her (Tentang Dia) (2005)
- Nine Dragons (9 Naga) (2006)
- Suddenly Dangdut (Mendadak Dangdut) (2006)
- Mengejar Mas-Mas (2007)
- In the Name of Love – 2008 romantic comedy with Vino G. Bastian, Acha Septriasa, Christine Hakim, Tutie Kirana and Roy Marten
- Five Eagles (5 Elang) (2011)
- If Mother is Gone Tomorrow (Bila Esok Ibu Tiada) (2024)

== Awards and nominations ==
Year	Award	Category	Recipients	Result
2004	Indonesian Film Festival	Citra Award for Best Director	Ada Apa dengan Cinta?	Won
2004	Indonesian Film Festival	Citra Award for Best Director	Mengejar Matahari	Nominated
2005	Indonesian Film Festival	Citra Award for Best Director	Tentang Dia	Nominated
2007	Indonesian Film Festival	Citra Award for Best Director	Mengejar Mas-Mas	Nominated
