= Sweet 20 (2017 film) =

- Film poster
- Directed by: Ody C. Harahap
- Screenplay by: Upi
- Story by: Shin Dong-Ik; Hoon Young Jeong; Dong Hee Soon; Hwang Dong-Hyuk; Upi
- Based on: Miss Granny
- Produced by: Chand Parwez Servia; Fiaz Servia; Riza; Min Yoon; Mike Im; Kang Eun Gyoung; Upi Avianto; Reza Servia; Mithu Nisar
- Starring: Tatjana Saphira; Morgan Oey; Kevin Julio
- Cinematography: Padri Nadeak
- Edited by: Aline Jusria
- Music by: Aghi Narottama
- Production companies: Starvision Plus; CJ Entertainment
- Distributed by: Starvision Plus
- Release date: 25 June 2017
- Running time: 109 minutes
- Country: Indonesia
- Language: Indonesia
- Box office: $3.53 million

Sweet 20 is an Indonesian musical romantic comedy film, a remake of the 2014 South Korean film Miss Granny, under collaboration of Starvision Plus in Indonesia and CJ Entertainment. This film is directed by Ody C. Harahap and stars Tatjana Saphira, Morgan Oey, Kevin Julio, Lukman Sardi, Niniek L. Karim and Slamet Rahardjo. This film tells the story about Fatmawati, a 70-year-old grandmother who magically gets back into her 20s after taking a photo in a mysterious photo studio. Sweet 20 was released on 25 June 2017 on the event of Eid al-Fitr.

== Plot ==
Fatmawati, a 70-year-old fussy grandmother, lives with her son, Aditya, daughter-in-law, and two grandchildren. Fatmawati has always been proud of Aditya, but is hurt when, one day, she finds out she will be sent to a nursing home. She runs away from the house, while regretting aging. That night, her sight falls upon mysterious photo studio Forever Young, and proceeds to want a picture of herself for her funeral. Before taking the photo, the photographer asks what she wants, she answers to make her look beautiful and young in the photo, then the photographer said he would make her 50 years younger. All is well, and the photo was taken, until suddenly Fatmawati really transforms into a woman 50 years younger; she becomes just like how she looked when she was 20 years old. Fatmawati started to live her new life as Mieke, a name of her idol Mieke Wijaya. As time goes by, Fatmawati gets the opportunity to realize her dream to become a singer, something she couldn't do back then. Her unique, old-fashioned speech and fashion style, conquers the heart of three men: music producer Alan, her own grandson, and Hamzah who has been in love with her 50 years ago. The latter has a late wife and living daughter, who constantly shows irritation at her father's caring attitude towards Fatmawati.

Throughout living as Mieke, Fatmawati is haunted by the fear that her legacy will be lost. Meanwhile, she learns that bleeding will cause her real skin to be exposed. As this is learned, Hamzah realizes the truth, and swears to keep this from everyone. As Fatmawati is about to appear on a television concert, everyone on the band learns that one of her grandson, Juna, loses a lot of blood in an accident. Juna's blood type is AB negative, one only belonged to Fatmawati. Unwilling to kill her grandson for her ego, she expresses will to transfer her blood to Juna. Aditya, who has known her identity all this time, apologizes to her mother for being a horrible son; Fatmawati says she never thinks so. While the band continues, Hamzah visits Young Forever just for Fatmawati, the love of his life.

== Cast ==
=== Main cast ===
- Tatjana Saphira as young Fatmawati
  - Saphira also portrays Mieke Wijaya
- Morgan Oey as Alan, a music producer
- Kevin Julio as Juna, Fatmawati's grandson

=== Supporting cast ===
- Alexa Key as Luna, Fatmawati's granddaughter
- Niniek L. Karim as old Fatmawati
- Slamet Rahardjo as Hamzah
- Lukman Sardi as Aditya, Fatmawati's son
- Widyawati as Rahayu
- Cut Mini as Salma
- Nina Kozok as Hagai
- Tika Panggabean as Bunga
- Ardit Erwandha as Edwan
- Tommy Limmm as Gio
- Febby Rastanty as Pevita
- Karina Nadila
- Barry Prima
- Vicky Nitinegoro
- Rina Hasyim
- Rima Melati
- Rudy Wowor
- Regina Rengganis
- Henky Solaiman as the photographer at the Forever Young photo studio
- McDanny
- Erick Estrada
- Randhika Djamil
- Aira Sondang
- Joe Project P
- Chrissie Vanessa
- Paulina Silitonga
- Ody C. Harahap
- Ministry Of Idol

== Production ==
Sweet 20 was directed by Ody C. Harahap, who has directed romantic comedy films like Kapan Kawin? and Cinta/Mati. The screenwriting was done by Upi. The film was shot in Bandung, including Braga Street, Asia Afrika Street and Bandung City Hall. Sweet 20 is an adaptation of the Korean film Miss Granny, with the difference is that Indonesian elements are added into the film, including dangdut and Lebaran. Miss Granny has been adapted into Chinese, Japanese, Thailand, and Vietnamese versions. Tatjana Saphira sang four of the five songs in the film, including "Bing" that was composed by Titiek Puspa, "Payung Fantasi" composed by Ismail Marzuki, "Layu Sebelum Berkembang" composed by A. Riyanto, and "Meraih Asa", the film's theme song, written by Upi and Tony with arrangement by Bemby Gusti. Besides those four songs, Gugun Blues Shelter sang "Selayang Pandang" composed by Lili Suhairi.

== Release ==
The film was released on 25 June 2017 on the event of Eid al-Fitr, together with Jailangkung, A Note to God, and Insya Allah Sah.

== Reception ==
As of 15 July 2017, Sweet 20 has been watched by 1,001,935 people.

According to film observer Shandy Gasella, "this remake is not as sitcom as the original film by Hwang Dong-Hyuk. The tone of the film is soft and happier, I like the grading. There are many additions of scenes of laughter, making this movie feel 'the same but different'." However, this film does not improvise much from the original film, and even though Fatma admires Mieke Wijaya, young Fatma's makeup is unlike Wijaya's. According to Jodhi Yudono from Kompas, Sweet 20 managed to be a family drama film as well as romantic comedy that is thick with the colours of Indonesia, both in settings, such as putting the atmosphere of Lebaran and conflict between children- and parents-in-law, and jokes throughout the film. This film also mixes senior film stars with recent actors, creating a nostalgic nuance.

=== Awards ===
Award	Year	Category	Recipient	Result	Ref.
Indonesian Film Festival	2017	Best Director	Ody C. Harahap	Nominated	
Indonesian Film Festival	2017	Best Writing – Adapted Screenplay	Upi Avianto	Nominated	
Indonesian Film Festival	2017	Best Artistic Direction	Vida Sylvia	Nominated	
Indonesian Film Festival	2017	Best Video Editing	Aline Jusria	Nominated	
Indonesian Film Festival	2017	Best Leading Actress	Tatjana Saphira	Nominated	
Indonesian Film Festival	2017	Best Supporting Actor	Slamet Rahardjo	Nominated	
Indonesian Film Festival	2017	Best Supporting Actress	Niniek L. Karim, Widyawati	Nominated	
Bandung Film Festival	2017	Best Music Arrangement	Aghi Narattama	Nominated	
Bandung Film Festival	2017	Best Leading Actor	Morgan Oey	Nominated	
Bandung Film Festival	2017	Best Leading Actress	Tatjana Saphira	Nominated	
Bandung Film Festival	2017	Best Supporting Actor	Slamet Rahardjo	Nominated	
Bandung Film Festival	2017	Best Supporting Actress	Widyawati	Nominated	
