= Tatjana Saphira =

Indonesian actress

- Born: Tatjana Saphira Hartmann; May 21, 1997 (age 29); Jakarta, Indonesia
- Occupations: Celebrity; model; singer
- Years active: Since 2010

Tatjana Saphira (born 21 May 1997) is an Indonesian actress, model, and singer from Jakarta. In 2018, she received the Outstanding Asian Star award at the Seoul International Drama Awards for her leading role in Sweet 20 and the Best Actress award at the Indonesian Box Office Movie Awards for her role in Ayat-Ayat Cinta 2.

== Filmography ==
=== Films ===
- Sweet 20 (2017)
- Ayat-Ayat Cinta 2 (2017)
- Ghost Writer (2019) as Naya
- Ghost Writer 2 (2022) as Naya
- Perempuan Bergaun Merah (2022) as Dinda

=== TV Series ===
- Mendua (2022) as Isabella Rijanto
- Sekotengs (2024) as Lifina
- Roman Dendam (2025) as Tiana
- Ipar adalah Maut the Series (2025) as Anisa Nazafarin
- Tiba-Tiba Brondong (2026) as Isabella Kamila Rahardja
- Istiqomah Cinta (2026) as Dr.Alika
