= Teuku Rifnu Wikana =

Indonesian actor (born 1980)

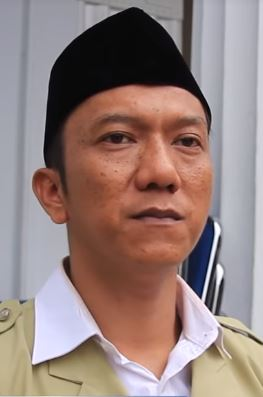
- Wikana as Daud Beureu'eh on short film Surat Kaleng 1949, 2018
- Born: 3 August 1980 (age 45); Pematangsiantar, North Sumatra, Indonesia
- Other names: Rifnu Wikana; T. Rifnu Wikana
- Occupation: actor
- Years active: 2004–present
- Spouse: Aida Fuady (m. 2010)
- Children: 1

Teuku Rifnu Wikana (born 3 August 1980) is an Indonesian actor of Acehnese descent. He became famous after starring in the films 9 Naga and Mendadak Dangdut in 2006. He was born in Pematangsiantar, North Sumatra.

== Career ==
He began his career as an actor in the theater in 2004. He has starred in many films, including Mendadak Dangdut, Maaf, Saya Menghamili Istri Anda, Laskar Pelangi, Habibie & Ainun, Sang Penari, Merah Putih, Mengejar Matahari, Belenggu, and others. He starred in Negeri Tanpa Telinga with Lukman Sardi in 2014.

== Filmography ==
- Mengejar Matahari (2004)
- 9 Naga (2006)
- Mendadak Dangdut (2006)
- Maaf, Saya Menghamili Istri Anda (2007)
- Otomatis Romantis (2008)
- XL, Antara Aku, Kau dan Mak Erot (2008)
- Kado Hari Jadi (2008)
- Laskar Pelangi (2008)
- Barbi3 (2008)
- Kalau Cinta Jangan Cengeng (2009)
- Merah Putih (2009)
- Di Dasar Segalanya (2010)
- Melodi (2010)
- Merah Putih 2: Darah Garuda (2010)
- Laskar Pemimpi (2010)
- Hati Merdeka (2011)
- Sang Penari (2011)
- Kita Versus Korupsi (2012)
- Habibie & Ainun (2012)
- Gending Sriwijaya (2013)
- Leher Angsa (2013)
- Belenggu (2013)
- Jokowi (2013)
- Bukan Hanya Mata Ketiga (2013)
- Sebelum Pagi Terulang Kembali (2014)
- Negeri Tanpa Telinga (2014)
- Dilan 1990 (2018)
- Suzzanna: Buried Alive (2018)
- Tembang Lingsir (2019)
- Perempuan Tanah Jahanam (2019)
- Srimulat: Hil yang Mustahal (2022) as Asmuni
- Dopamine (2025)
- Comedy Buddy (2025)
