= Jowy Khoury =

Lebanese actress

- جوّي خوري
- Born: 17 January 1988 (age 38); Ashrafieh, Lebanon
- Website: Official website

Jowy Khoury (born 17 January 1988) is a Lebanese actress, born and raised in Beirut, Lebanon.

== Education ==
She began her acting experience at the age of ten, where she started performing in school plays and later took part in many acting and dancing competitions across the country, her interest in the creative arts and film making growing throughout her teenage years. At the age of twelve, she had written and directed a play. Gathering her friends, they performed for the rest of the neighborhood. Her French theater teacher, impressed by her work, assigned her to write and direct school plays for the next three years. She studied French Literature at the “Lebanese University of Literature and Philosophy”, and later majored in cinematography at Al-Kafaat University (AKU) in Lebanon.

== TV series ==
After a few years of working behind the camera as an executive producer and art director, Jowy landed several small roles in television series, slowly working her way up to leading roles in “Eshk el Nisa’” (Women in Passion) and “’ilakat Khassa” (Private Affairs). Both series were pan-arab, bringing together actors from all over the Middle East, making her known to viewers all over the Arab world.

Her leading roles continued in many projects, local and pan-arab, notably “Awal Nazra” (At First Sight), “Mahroumin” (The Deprived), “Sarkhet Rouh” (Cry of the Soul), “Shouq” (Longing), “Mozakarat A’shika Sabika” (Diaries of a Past Lover), “Madrasat el Hob” (School of Love), “A’ndi Aleb” (I Have a Heart), “Hawa Asfar” (Yellow Winds) etc.

== Film ==
Her first feature film was “I Leave My Heart in Lebanon” (2017), by Benni Setiawan, produced by T.B. Silalahi. For one month, she underwent intense Indonesian language classes for six hours a day as well as training sessions with the rest of the cast during the pre-production phase.

== Awards ==
Khoury received several nominations for “Best Lebanese Actress” and “Best Lebanese Supporting Actress” over the span of her career, and in 2016, she won the Murex D’or award as the “Phenomena of the Year” in 2016.

== Activism ==
Khoury collaborated with "Oum el Nour", a drug rehabilitation center in Lebanon, where she made a speech to raise awareness on the dangers of drug use among the youth at the "My Choice" event in Zaytuna Bay.

In 2016, she donated her belongings at a live auction on social media, to raise money for "Himaya", an NGO that works to protect abused children

When asked which political party she supported, she answered "I support every child who is forced to work, every child subjected to child labor, because these are the ones who need our support. Children need protection from us, and we are not giving it to them."
