= Adinia Wirasti =

Indonesian actress

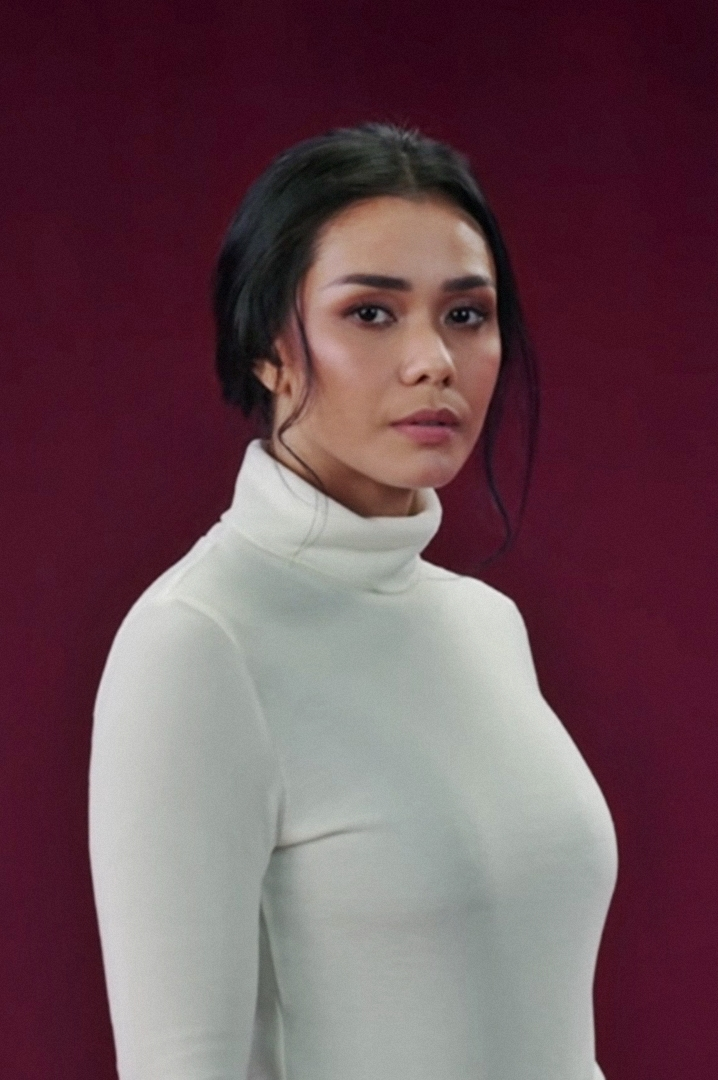
- Wirasti in 2020
- Born: Adinia Wirasti Wijayanto; 19 January 1987 (age 39); Jakarta, Indonesia
- Other name: Adinia Wirasti
- Education: New York Film Academy
- Occupation: Actress
- Years active: 2002–present
- Spouse: Michael Wahr (m. 2023)
- Parent(s): Raden Wijayanto (father); Lukitawati Salatun (mother)
- Relatives: Sara Wijayanto (elder sister); Wisnu Hardana (elder brother); Demian Aditya (elder brother-in-law)
- Awards: Citra Award for Best Leading Actress; Laura & Marsha (2013); Citra Award for Best Supporting Actress; Tentang Dia (2005)

Adinia Wirasti Wahr (née Wijayanto; born 19 January 1987), is an Indonesian actress of Javanese descent. In 2008, she graduated from the New York Film Academy one year Screenwriting Program in Los Angeles, California.

== Early life ==
Adinia Wirasti is of Javanese descent. In her childhood she was introduced to Javanese culture such as wayang by her grandparents.

== Personal life ==
Adinia Wirasti married Australian actor Michael Wahr in Melbourne, Australia, on 15 May 2023.

== Career ==
Adinia started her career as a model in a youth magazine. Her acting debut occurred when she starred in the film Ada Apa Dengan Cinta? (What's Up With Love?) in 2002. In the film she played Karmen.

She won the Citra Award for Best Supporting Actress at the 2005 Indonesian Film Festival for her role in the film Tentang Dia. In the film, Adinia plays the role of Rudy. In addition, she also received an award at the Bandung Film Festival for the same film.

In 2006, Adinia acted in the film Dunia Mereka and Ruang. In March 2007, Adinia returned in the film 3 Hari untuk Selamanya directed by Riri Riza.

In 2013, Adinia won the Citra Award for Best Actress at the 2013 Indonesian Film Festival for the film Laura & Marsha.

== Filmography ==
| Year | Title | Role |
|---|---|---|
| 2002 | Ada Apa Dengan Cinta? | Karmen |
| 2004 | Tentang Dia | Rudi |
| 2006 | 3 Hari Untuk Selamanya | Ambar |
| 2006 | Ruang | Flori |
| 2006 | Dunia Mereka | Filly |
| 2010 | Jakarta Maghrib | |
| 2011 | Arisan! 2 | Moli |
| 2013 | Laura & Marsha | Marsha |
| 2014 | Selamat Pagi, Malam | Gia |
| 2015 | Blood Brothers | |
| 2015 | Kapan Kawin? | Dinda |
| 2016 | Ada Apa Dengan Cinta? 2 | Karmen |
| 2016 | Cek Toko Sebelah | Ayu |
| 2017 | Kartini | R.A. Soelastri |
| 2017 | Critical Eleven | Tanya Baskoro |
| 2017 | Satu Hari Nanti | Alya |
| 2017 | Susah Sinyal | Ellen |
| 2018 | Sultan Agung | Lembayung |
| 2018 | Milly & Mamet: Ini Bukan Cinta & Rangga | Karmen |
| 2019 | Lampor: Keranda Terbang | Netta |
| 2021 | Kamu Tidak Sendiri | Mira |
| 2022 | Mr. Midnight: Beware the Monsters | Silvya |
| 2022 | Mendua | Dr. Sekar Atmajaya |
| 2022 | Cek Toko Sebelah 2 | Ayu |
| 2024 | Bila Esok Ibu Tiada | Ranika |
| 2024 | Hidup Ini Terlalu Banyak Kamu | Mera |
| 2026 | Manis Di Bibir | Niken |
| 2026 | Sadali | Mera |

== Awards and nominations ==
| Year | Award | Category | Recipients | Result |
|---|---|---|---|---|
| 2005 | MTV Indonesia Movie Awards | Most Favorite Actress | Tentang Dia | Nominated |
| 2005 | Indonesian Film Festival | Citra Award for Best Supporting Actress | Tentang Dia | Won |
| 2012 | Maya Awards | Best Actress in a Supporting Role | Arisan! 2 | Won |
| 2013 | Maya Awards | Best Actress in a Leading Role | Laura & Marsha | Nominated |
| 2013 | Indonesian Film Festival | Citra Award for Best Leading Actress | Laura & Marsha | Won |
| 2015 | Indonesian Film Festival | Citra Award for Best Leading Actress | Kapan Kawin? | Nominated |
| 2015 | Maya Awards | Best Actress in a Leading Role | Kapan Kawin? | Nominated |
| 2015 | Indonesian Movie Actors Awards | Best Chemistry | Selamat Pagi, Malam | Nominated |
| 2016 | Maya Awards | Best Actress in a Supporting Role | Ada Apa Dengan Cinta? 2 | Nominated |
| 2017 | Indonesian Film Festival | Citra Award for Best Leading Actress | Critical Eleven | Nominated |
| 2017 | Indonesian Film Festival | Citra Award for Best Supporting Actress | Cek Toko Sebelah | Nominated |
