= Posesif =

2017 Indonesian drama film

- Directed by: Edwin
- Written by: Gina S. Noer
- Produced by: Edwin; Muhammad Zaidy; Meiske Taurisia
- Starring: Putri Marino; Adipati Dolken; Gritte Agatha; Chicco Kurniawan; Yayu Unru; Cut Mini
- Cinematography: Batara Goempar
- Edited by: W. Ichwan Diardono
- Music by: Mar Galo; Ken Jenie; Dave Lumenta
- Production company: Palari Films
- Release date: October 26, 2017
- Country: Indonesia
- Language: Indonesian

Posesif (lit. 'Possessive') is a 2017 Indonesian psychological drama film directed by Edwin and written by Gina S. Noer, starring Putri Marino and Adipati Dolken. The film was released on 26 October 2017.

The film focuses on a couple of high school students in a turbulent relationship. The film was well received by critics and audiences alike and garnered 10 nominations at the 37th Citra Awards, including Best Picture. It won three: Best Director (Edwin), Best Actress (Putri Marino), and Best Supporting Actor (Yayu Unru).

== Synopsis ==
Lala Anindhita (Putri Marino) is a platform diving athlete in her final year of high school in Jakarta. Since her mother died, she feels her world is complete with her father (who is also her trainer), and her two friends, Rino (Chicco Kurniawan) and Ega (Gritte Agatha). Even though her father is quite strict, Lala remains good-spirited.

At school, while helping her teacher, Lala meets Yudhis Ibrahim (Adipati Dolken), a transfer student who immediately gets into trouble with a teacher. The two students are disciplined and they are made to walk the around the school oval with their shoelaces tied to each other's. They are humiliated in front of the whole school, but they bond through the experience and later start dating.

Lala's father, while nonchalant about her dating, begins to notice that her athletic and academic discipline is wavering. At the same time, Yudhis begins to show possessive behaviour and wants Lala to be by his side at all times.

== Cast ==
- Putri Marino as Lala, a high school athlete
- Adipati Dolken as Yudhis, a transfer student
- Gritte Agatha as Ega
- Chicco Kurniawan as Rino
- Cut Mini as Yudhis' mother
- Yayu Unru as Lala's father
- Ismail Basbeth as sports teacher
- Maulidina Putri as Jihan
- Pranarta as Lala's coach

== Themes ==
Posesif explores themes of violence within relationships.

Screenwriter Gina S. Noer conducted six months of research on the topic for the film's production, finding that violence typically manifests in the first phases of dating relationships, and most frequently affects women aged 13 to 24 years.

== Release ==
The film received theatrical release in Indonesia on 26 October 2017, and is classified by Lembaga Sensor Film as suitable for ages 13 and above.

== Reception ==
=== Box office ===
Posesif performed moderately at the box office with a reported 170,000 admissions during its run, making it Edwin's most commercially successful release to date.

=== Critical response ===
Posesif received mixed reviews. Puput Juniman of CNN Indonesia praised the film for avoiding tropes and cliché storylines as well as for Edwin's direction, the cast performances, and Batara Goempar's cinematography. Aulia Adam of Tirto.id highlighted the film's portrayal of a toxic relationship and how it plays in a patriarchal society, but felt that the film left some important questions unanswered. Bernadetta Yucki of Cultura gave it a 3.5 out of 5, writing "the blend of romantic drama and a touch of thriller in this film is still not executed optimally due to certain "limitations". Bavner Donaldo of Cinejour gave it a 4.5 out of 5, writing "Posesif is able to tell a story simply, making us question its meaning again, until finally we are carried away and swept away by its story." Meanwhile, according to ScreenDaily, Posesif often proves that there are good intentions that go astray; an attempt to dive deeper but instead tempted back into a comfortable pattern.

== Awards and nominations ==
Year	Award	Category	Recipients	Result
2017	37th Citra Awards	Best Picture	Posesif	Nominated
2017	37th Citra Awards	Best Director	Edwin	Won
2017	37th Citra Awards	Best Actor	Adipati Dolken	Nominated
2017	37th Citra Awards	Best Actress	Putri Marino	Won
2017	37th Citra Awards	Best Supporting Actor	Yayu Unru	Won
2017	37th Citra Awards	Best Supporting Actress	Cut Mini	Nominated
2017	37th Citra Awards	Best Original Screenplay	Gina S. Noer	Nominated
2017	37th Citra Awards	Best Cinematography	Batara Goempar	Nominated
2017	37th Citra Awards	Best Editing	W. Ichwan Diardono	Nominated
2017	37th Citra Awards	Best Makeup & Hairstyling	Cika Rianda	Nominated
2017	6th Maya Award	Best Actor in a Leading Role	Adipati Dolken	Nominated
2017	6th Maya Award	Best Actress in a Leading Role	Putri Marino	Won
2017	6th Maya Award	Best Cinematography	Batara Goempar	Nominated
2017	1st Tempo Film Festival	Best Film	Posesif	Nominated
2017	1st Tempo Film Festival	Best Director	Edwin	Nominated
2017	1st Tempo Film Festival	Best Actor	Adipati Dolken	Nominated
2017	1st Tempo Film Festival	Best Actress	Putri Marino	Nominated
2017	1st Tempo Film Festival	Best Supporting Actor	Yayu Unru	Nominated
2017	1st Tempo Film Festival	Best Supporting Actress	Cut Mini	Nominated
2017	1st Tempo Film Festival	Best Screenplay	Gina S. Noer	Nominated
