= Chaerul Umam =

Indonesian film director (1943–2013)

- Born: 4 April 1943; Tegal, Central Java, Dutch East Indies
- Died: 3 October 2013 (aged 70); Jakarta, Indonesia
- Education: Gadjah Mada University
- Occupation: Director
- Years active: 1975–2012
- Awards: Citra Award for Best Director (1992)

Chaerul Umam (4 April 1943 – 3 October 2013) was an Indonesian film director best known for his Islamic films. Born in Tegal, Umam became active in the theatre while studying in Yogyakarta. After moving to Jakarta, he became involved in cinema, making his feature film debut in 1973 and directing his first film, Tiga Sekawan (Three Friends), in 1973.

Umam's first religious film, Al Kautsar (1977), was a commercial success, while his Titian Serambut Dibelah Tujuh (The Narrow Bridge, 1982) earned him his first nomination for the Citra Award for Best Director. His Kejarlah Daku Kau Kutangkap (Chase Me, I'll Catch You) was the best-selling Indonesian film of 1986, while Ramadhan dan Ramona (Ramadhan and Ramona) won five Citra Awards—including for Best Director. Dedicating himself to television after the failure of Fatahillah (1997), Umam returned to cinema with the commercially successful Ketika Cinta Bertasbih duology in 2009.

== Biography ==
=== Early life and career ===
Umam was born in Tegal, Central Java, Dutch East Indies, on 4 April 1943. For university, Umam travelled to Yogyakarta, where he enroled at Gadjah Mada University and studied psychology. While in Yogyakarta, he became involved in the theatre, first joining the Amatir Theatre in 1964 and later the Bengkel Theatre under Rendra in 1966.

Umam moved to Jakarta in 1970. At first, he remained active in theatre, joining Arifin C. Noer's Kecil Theatre. He then migrated to film, working as assistant director for Bing Slamet Dukun Palsu (Bing Slamet the False Shaman, 1973). His directorial debut was Tiga Sekawan (Three Friends, 1975).

=== Early films ===
In 1977, Umam directed two films. One was Cinta Putih (Bidan Aminah) (Pure Love [Midwife Aminah], 1977), a drama film starring Yati Octavia as a young woman who experiences difficulties after being left pregnant by her boyfriend. The other was Al Kautsar, a dakwah (proselytization) film starring Rendra as a young santri who travels to a rural village to preach Islam. This latter film was a commercial success, with its screening at the first-class cinema in Menteng, Jakarta, lasting five weeks, and becoming many audience members' first experiences with cinema.

Al Kautsar, which was screened at the 23rd Asian Film Festival in Thailand, had been written by Asrul Sani. In 1982, Umam directed Titian Serambut Dibelah Tujuh (The Narrow Bridge), a remake of Sani's 1959 film of the same name. With the success of this film, for which he was nominated for his first Citra Award for Best Director at the Indonesian Film Festival, Umam cemented his reputation as a director. He gained a reputation for directing films with Islamic themes, which was unusual due to the tensions between the ruling New Order regime and Indonesia's Muslim community.

=== Mainstream success ===
Umam's film Kejarlah Daku Kau Kutangkap (Chase Me, I'll Catch You, 1986) was a comedy starring Deddy Mizwar and Lydia Kandou as a couple brought together by a newspaper promotion. Selling 166,734 tickets in the Jakarta capital region, it had the largest box office proceeds of that year's domestic productions. It also earned Umam his second Citra Award nomination. Umam received another Citra Award nomination in 1989 for Joe Turun ke Desa (Joe Goes to the Village),

In 1990, Umam directed Oom Pasikom (Parodi Ibukota) (Uncle Pasikom [Parody of the Capital]), based on the Kompas character. Another film, Nada dan Dakwah (Tunes and Worship, 1992), received seven Citra Award nominations. Starring Zainuddin M. Z., a prominent da'i, the film followed a preacher who challenged a business conglomerate involved in a shady land deal. Also that year, Umam directed Ramadhan dan Ramona (Ramadhan and Ramona), which starred Lydia Kandou and Jamal Mirdad as young lovers attempting to establish their own identities separate from their wealthy parents. A moderate commercial success, this film won five Citra awards at the 1992 Indonesian Film Festival, including Umam's only Citra Award for Best Director.

In the late 1990s, the Indonesian film industry experienced a downturn. Umam, together with Imam Tantowi, were entrusted with the direction of Fatahillah (1997), a film subsidized by the Jakarta government and hoped to revitalize the industry. This film, however, was a commercial failure, and Umam retreated from directing feature films. He worked on several television shows during this period, including Jalan Lain ke Sana (Another Road There), Jalan Takwa (The Path to Piety), and Astagfirullah (By God!).

=== Later years and death ===
After twelve years, Umam returned to the feature film industry as the director of Ketika Cinta Bertasbih (When Love Prays, 2009). For this film, based on the novel by Habiburrahman El Shirazy, he was again paired with Tantowi, who took a screenwriter role. The duo produced a sequel to the film, also in 2009. These films were the first films given the halal label by the Majelis Ulama Indonesia, and box office successes. Umam's last film, Cinta Suci Zahrana (Zahrana's Pure Love, 2012), was another adaptation of a novel by El Shirazy.

Umam was hospitalized at Pondok Kopi Hospital in Jakarta in late September 2013, having experienced a stroke that left him with difficulty speaking. Umam died on 3 October 2013. Speaking to the Indonesian news agency Antara, Chairman of Muhammadiyah Din Syamsuddin described Umam's death as a great loss for Indonesian Muslims and the nation, as his films had consistently featured strong dakwah messages.

== Analysis ==
Although Umam directed several successful dramas and comedies, he had a reputation for films with Islamic themes. Writing in Jurnal Footage, Renal Rinoza Kasturi described Umam as inconsistent in his filmic treatment of Islam, with his earlier works suggesting that Islam provided a transformative moral force for its adherents. His later films, meanwhile, Kasturi saw as offering a closed understanding of the religion limited to specific markers—Muslim actors, veiled actresses, and an eye to sharia law.

== Filmography ==
During his career, Umam directed 24 films. He also wrote the screenplay for one film, Terang Bulan di Tengah Hari (A Bright Sun at Midday, 1988).

- Tiga Sekawan (Three Friends, 1975)
- Al Kautsar (1977)
- Cinta Putih (Bidan Aminah) (Pure Love [Midwife Aminah], 1977)
- Sepasang Merpati (A Pair of Doves, 1979)
- Betapa Damai Hati Kami (How Peaceful Our Hearts, 1981)
- Gadis Marathon (Marathon Girl, 1981)
- Titian Serambut Dibelah Tujuh (The Narrow Bridge, 1982)
- Hati yang Perawan (A Virgin Heart, 1984)
- Kejarlah Daku Kau Kutangkap (Chase Me, I'll Catch You, 1986)
- Sama Juga Bohong (Still a Lie, 1986)
- Keluarga Markum (Markum's Family, 1986)
- Bintang Kejora (Morning Star, 1986)
- Terang Bulan di Tengah Hari (A Bright Sun at Midday, 1988)
- Joe Turun ke Desa (Joe Goes to the Village, 1989)
- Malioboro (1989)
- Jangan Bilang Siapa-siapa (Don't Tell Anyone, 1990)
- Oom Pasikom (Parodi Ibukota) (Uncle Pasikom (A Parody of the Capital), 1990)
- Boss Carmad (1990)
- Nada dan Dakwah (Tunes and Worship, 1991)
- Ramadhan dan Ramona (Ramadhan and Ramona, 1992)
- Fatahillah (1997)
- Ketika Cinta Bertasbih (When Love Prays, 2009)
- Ketika Cinta Bertasbih 2 (When Love Prays 2, 2009)
- Cinta Suci Zahrana (Zahrana's Pure Love, 2012)

== Awards ==
During his career, Umam was nominated for the Citra Award for Best Director five times, with his only win being Ramadhan dan Ramona (Ramadhan and Ramona) in 1992. He was also nominated for two awards at the Bandung Film Festival.

Awards	Year	Category	Nominated work	Result	Ref.
Festival Film Indonesia	1983	Best Director	Titian Serambut Dibelah Tujuh	Nominated	
Festival Film Indonesia	1986	Best Director	Kejarlah Daku Kau Kutangkap	Nominated	
Festival Film Indonesia	1990	Best Director	Joe Turun ke Desa	Nominated	
Festival Film Indonesia	1992	Best Director	Nada dan Dakwah	Nominated	
Festival Film Indonesia	1992	Best Director	Ramadhan dan Ramona	Won	
Bandung Film Festival	1993	Best Director	Nada dan Dakwah	Nominated	
Bandung Film Festival	1993	Best Director	Ramadhan dan Ramona	Nominated	

== Works cited ==
- Ichsan, Adhie (3 October 2013). "Chaerul Umam, Sutradara yang Konsisten di Film Islami" [Chaerul Umam, a Director Consistent with Islamic Films]. Detik.com (in Indonesian). Jakarta. Archived from the original on 12 March 2026.
- "Al Kautsar". filmindonesia.or.id (in Indonesian). Konfiden Foundation. Archived from the original on 28 February 2026.
- Barker, Thomas (2019). Indonesian Cinema after the New Order: Going Mainstream. Hong Kong University Press. ISBN 978-988-8528-07-3.
- "Cinta Putih (Bidan Aminah)" [Pure Love (Midwife Aminah)]. filmindonesia.or.id (in Indonesian). Konfiden Foundation. Archived from the original on 25 April 2025.
- Cohen, Margot (1 May 1992). "Film: Indonesian Preacher Goes `Hollywood'". Asian Wall Street Journal. Hong Kong. p. 7. ProQuest 308832712 – via ProQuest.
- Cohen, Margot (20 June 1997). "Cinema: Indonesia Screens a Holy War". Asian Wall Street Journal. Hong Kong. p. 11. ProQuest 315614489 – via ProQuest.
- "Director Chaerul Umam dies at 70". The Jakarta Post. Jakarta. 4 October 2013. Archived from the original on 12 March 2026.
- "Filmografi Imam Setyantono Chaerul Umam" [Filmography for Imam Setyantono Chaerul Umam]. filmindonesia.or.id (in Indonesian). Konfiden Foundation. Archived from the original on 5 March 2026.
- Hariyadi (2013). "Finding Islam in Cinema: Islamic Films and the Identity of Indonesian Muslim Youths". Al-Jami'ah: Journal of Islamic Studies. 51 (2). doi:10.14421/ajis.2013.512.443-473.
- Heryanto, Ariel (2014). Identity and Pleasure: The Politics of Indonesian Screen Culture. NUS Press. ISBN 978-9971-69-821-8.
- "Imam Setyantono Chaerul Umam". filmindonesia.or.id (in Indonesian). Konfiden Foundation. Archived from the original on 28 February 2026.
- Kasturi, Renal Rinoza (10 March 2012). "Ambivalensi Sikap Chaerul Umam" [The Ambivalent Attitude of Chaerul Umam]. Jurnal Footage (in Indonesian). Archived from the original on 23 June 2012.
- "Kejarlah Daku Kau Kutangkap" [Chase Me, I'll Catch You]. filmindonesia.or.id (in Indonesian). Konfiden Foundation. Archived from the original on 14 February 2026.
- "Penghargaan Imam Setyantono Chaerul Umam" [Awards for Imam Setyantono Chaerul Umam]. filmindonesia.or.id (in Indonesian). Konfiden Foundation. Archived from the original on 12 February 2025.
- "Ramadhan dan Ramona" [Ramadhan and Ramona]. filmindonesia.or.id (in Indonesian). Konfiden Foundation. Archived from the original on 12 February 2025.
- Rokhman, Muh Arif (2022). Indonesian Islamic Fiction in the 21st Century: Representations of the Other in the Works of Forum Lingkar Pena. Yogyakarta: UAD Press. ISBN 978-623-5635-17-0.
- Sasono, Eric (11 September 2011). "Film Islam Indonesia Kini" [Indonesian Islamic Films Today]. Tempo (in Indonesian). p. 78.
- Setianto, Yearry Panji (2026). "Mediatization of Indonesian Islam: A Historical Examination of Media and Religious Change" (PDF). Religions. 17 (2): 170. doi:10.3390/rel17020170.
- Tanamas, Ronald (30 April 2008). "Chaerul Umam: Saya Ingin Kalahkan AAC" [Chaerul Umam: I Want to Beat AAC]. Detik.com. Jakarta. Archived from the original on 12 March 2026.
- Wijaya, Ahmad (3 October 2013). "Umat Islam Kehilangan Sutradara Chaerul Umam" [Muslim Community has Lost Director Chaerul Umam]. Antara (in Indonesian). Jakarta. Archived from the original on 5 October 2013.
- Yazid, Nauval (14 June 2009). "'Ketika Cinta Bertasbih': Offers Picturesque Views – and Nothing Else". The Jakarta Post. Jakarta. Archived from the original on 11 March 2026.
