= Nada dan Dakwah =

- Theatrical poster
- Directed by: Chaerul Umam
- Written by: Asrul Sani
- Screenplay by: Asrul Sani
- Starring: Rhoma Irama; Zainuddin M. Z.; Ida Iasha
- Cinematography: Harry Susanto
- Edited by: Effendi Doytha
- Music by: Rhoma Irama
- Production company: PT Bola Dunia Film
- Release date: 1992 (Indonesia)
- Country: Indonesia
- Language: Indonesian

Nada dan Dakwah (stylized as Nada & Dakwah, transl. Tunes and Worship) is a 1992 Indonesian religious musical drama film directed by Chaerul Umam. Starring Rhoma Irama, Zainuddin M. Z., and Ida Iasha, the film follows a small group of Muslims that successfully challenge a conglomerate's efforts to build a factory on their land. The film, considered one of Rhoma Irama's best, won two awards at the 1992 Indonesian Film Festival. It has been noted for its criticism of the political situation in New Order Indonesia as well as its emphasis on Islamic economics.

== Plot ==
Rhoma (Rhoma Irama) meets with the businessman Basuki (W. D. Mochtar) for dinner. Discussing Basuki's plans to expand his enterprises on waqf (religious endowment) land used by a pesantren (Islamic school) in Pandan Wangi, Rhoma urges him to reconsider. Upon returning to the office, Basuki is angered, but his assistant reassures him that the villagers will be unable to prove anything. Meanwhile, conflict breaks out between the villagers and construction crews, though Hajji Murad (Deddy Mizwar) is able to calm the situation before violence erupts.

Visited by Basuki's daughter Latifah (Ida Iasha), Rhoma sings a song about the importance of maintaining land. The two later travel to Pandan Wangi, where they discuss potential means of saving the land. Meanwhile, the villagers attempt to negotiate an alternative use of land, but as it was not formally registered they realize that their position is weak. Many of them, fearing unable to resist the encroachment of the business, discuss the prices they would accept for their land. Basuki refuses to pay the higher prices, fearing that his Korean investors would not approve, and rejects Rhoma's suggestion for a co-operative.

As the villagers debate the use of their land, Rhoma travels to Pandan Wangi to meet with the pesantren students. Ustad Zainuddin (Zainuddin M. Z.) likewise delivers a sermon to villagers, reminding them of Islam's emphasis on hard work and urging them to recognize the importance of their land. Latifah likewise urges the villagers not to sell their land, explaining the different avenues available for them to challenge the development project. Their combined efforts are sufficient to convince most villagers to reject the sale of their land and return any payment received.

Seeking to control the situation, Bustomi travels to Pandan Wangi, where he learns that his hired men had misled residents about the purpose of the construction and been offering less than a third of the amount budgeted. After listening to a sermon by Zainuddin, he agrees to return residents' land once they have returned their money. Returning home, he turns to prayer. That night, one of the hired men – angered that their plans had been foiled – attacks and kills Murad. Rhoma travels to their gambling den, where he is attacked. He defends himself readily, and the police arrive to arrest the gang. Ultimately, Bustomi signs formal agreement to collaborate with the people of Pandan Wangi.

== Production ==
Nada dan Dakwah was directed by Chaerul Umam for PT Bola Dunia Film based on an original screenplay by Asrul Sani. Umam, who had a reputation for directing films with Islamic themes, had been collaborating with Sani since Al Kautsar in 1977. Cinematography was handled by Harry Susanto, with artistic direction by Teuku Rusian. Music was handled by Didi AGP, with sound editing by S. Edi Pramono. The film was edited by Effendi Doytha. Songs for the soundtrack, rendered in the dangdut style, were provided by Rhoma Irama.

Irama was also cast as a protagonist of Nada dan Dakwah. He had previously established a reputation as an actor in musical films with Islamic themes. These had generally featured a love story with an admirer, something absent in Nada dan Dakwah. As co-protagonist, Zainuddin M. Z., a popular preacher whose sermons were widely disseminated through radio, was cast. Both performers played themselves. During an interview, Zainuddin explained his hopes that the film would counter Western cinematic depictions of Muslims as extremists or terrorists. Further roles were taken by W. D. Mochtar, Deddy Mizwar, Ida Iasha, and Nani Widjaja.

== Analysis ==
Nada dan Dakwah contains criticism of several tendencies in contemporary Indonesia. At the same time, The Indonesian film critic Eric Sasono notes that it challenges the approach used by contemporary preachers. He writes that the film presents formalistic elements such as rote memorization as limiting preachers' ability to spread their messages to youths, whereas more dynamic approaches are seen as effective. He highlights the film's emphasis on Islamic economics, promoting the adoption of new knowledge with some adaptation to match Islamic values. The Australian film scholar David Hanan likewise notes a strong economic message, that the Indonesian people should be producers rather than consumers.

== Release and reception ==
Nada dan Dakwah was released in 1992. Reviewing in the Asian Wall Street Journal, Margot Cohen described Nada dan Dakwah as didactic but witty, with barbed criticism of the Suharto regime's monopolistic tendencies as well as the Indonesian state lottery. In his catalogue of Indonesian films, JB Kristanto cited Nada dan Dakwah as Rhoma Irama's best film; this assessment is echoed by Hanan.

At the 1992 Indonesian Film Festival, Nada dan Dakwah was nominated for seven Citra Awards, including Best Film and Best Original Screenplay. Zainuddin, nominated for best supporting actor, withdrew himself from consideration due to complaints from his congregation about his decision to act in a film. The film won two awards, for its screenplay and its sound direction. The following year, at the Bandung Film Festival, Nada dan Dakwah was nominated for three awards.

Award	Year	Category	Nominee	Result	Ref.
Indonesian Film Festival	1992	Citra Award for Best Film		Nominated	
Indonesian Film Festival	1992	Citra Award for Best Actor	Rhoma Irama	Nominated	
Indonesian Film Festival	1992	Citra Award for Best Supporting Actor	Zainuddin M. Z.	Nominated	
Indonesian Film Festival	1992	Citra Award for Best Director	Chaerul Umam	Nominated	
Indonesian Film Festival	1992	Citra Award for Best Original Screenplay	Asrul Sani	Won	
Indonesian Film Festival	1992	Citra Award for Best Musical Direction	Didi AGP	Nominated	
Indonesian Film Festival	1992	Citra Award for Best Sound Direction	S. Edi Pramono	Won	
Bandung Film Festival	1993	Best Director	Chaerul Umam	Nominated	
Bandung Film Festival	1993	Best Actor	Deddy Mizwar	Nominated	
Bandung Film Festival	1993	Best Screenplay	Asrul Sani	Nominated	

== Works cited ==
- Cohen, Margot (1 May 1992). "Film: Indonesian Preacher Goes 'Hollywood'". Asian Wall Street Journal. Hong Kong. p. 7. ProQuest 308832712 – via ProQuest.
- "Daftar Lengkap Pemeran dan Kru Nada dan Dakwah" [Complete Cast and Crew of Nada dan Dakwah]. filmindonesia.or.id (in Indonesian). Konfiden Foundation. Archived from the original on 14 March 2026.
- Hanan, David (2021). Moments in Indonesian Film History: Film and Popular Culture in a Developing Society 1950–2020. Springer. ISBN 978-3-030-72613-3.
- Kasturi, Renal Rinoza (10 March 2012). "Ambivalensi Sikap Chaerul Umam" [The Ambivalent Attitude of Chaerul Umam]. Jurnal Footage (in Indonesian). Archived from the original on 23 June 2012.
- Mulder, Niels (1993). "The Urban Educated Middle Stratum and Religion in Southeast Asia". Sojourn: Journal of Social Issues in Southeast Asia. 8 (1): 184 –&#32, 194. doi:10.1355/SJ8-1H. JSTOR 3649190.
- "Nada dan Dakwah" [Tunes and Worship]. filmindonesia.or.id (in Indonesian). Konfiden Foundation. Archived from the original on 14 March 2026.
- "Penghargaan Nada dan Dakwah" [Awards for Nada dan Dakwah]. filmindonesia.or.id (in Indonesian). Konfiden Foundation. Archived from the original on 14 March 2026.
- Sasono, Eric (2013). "Islamic Revivalism and Religious Piety in Indonesian Cinema". In Daniels, Timothy P. (ed.). Performance, Popular Culture, and Piety in Muslim Southeast Asia. Palgrave Macmillan. pp. 45–75. doi:10.1057/9781137318398_3. ISBN 978-1-349-45759-5.
