= National Awakening Party =

Political party in Indonesia

National Awakening Party Partai Kebangkitan Bangsa
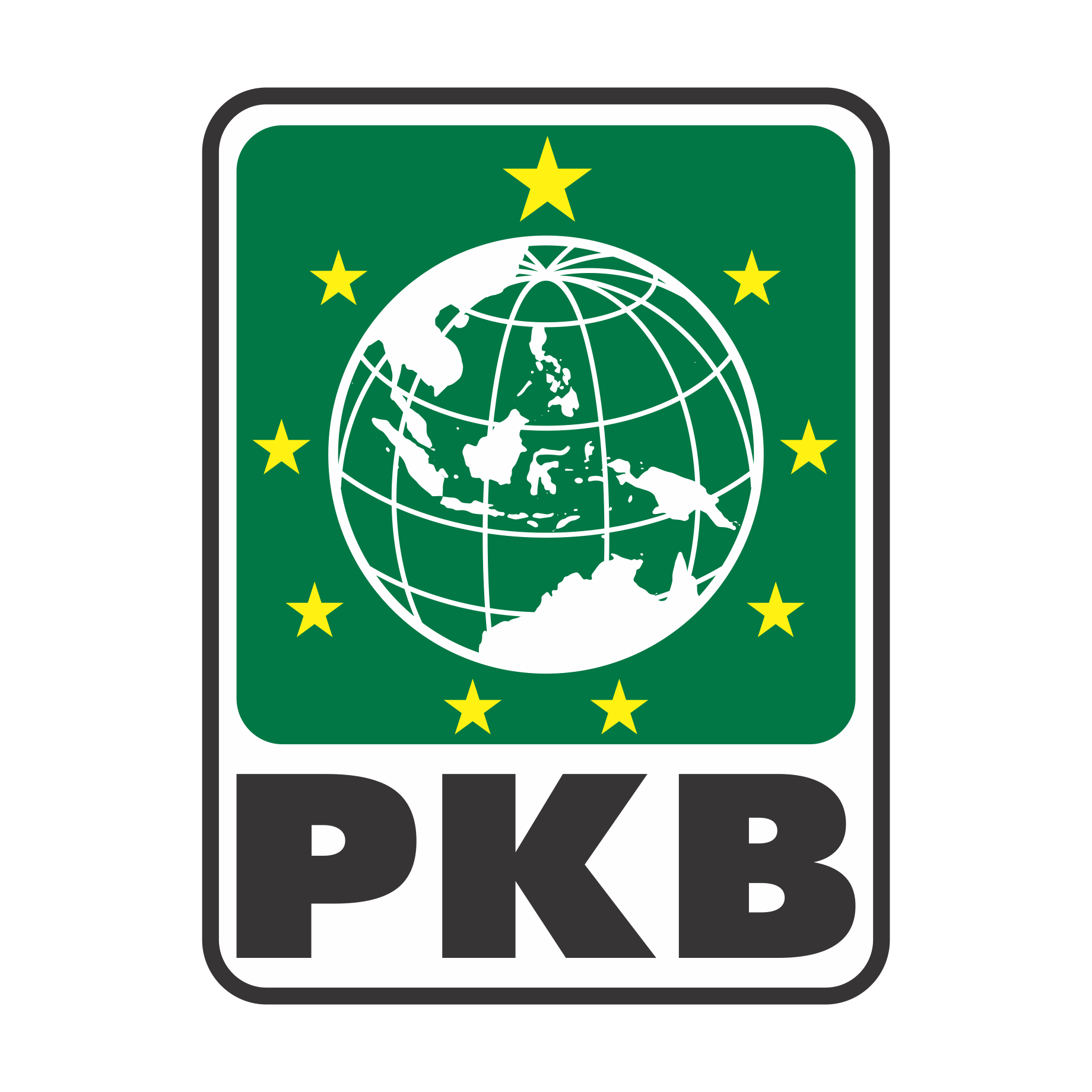
- Abbreviation: PKB
- General Chairman: Muhaimin Iskandar
- Secretary-General: Hasanuddin Wahid
- DPR group leader: Jazilul Fawaid
- Founder: Abdurrahman Wahid
- Founded: 9 July 1998; 28 years ago 23 July 1998; 28 years ago (declaration)
- Headquarters: Jakarta
- Student wing: Gemasaba (One Nation's Student Movement)
- Youth wing: Garda Bangsa (Nation's Guard)
- Membership (2022): 388,638
- Ideology: Pancasila; Islamic democracy Pluralism; Liberalism; Indonesian nationalism Centrism; Historical: Anti-neoliberalism
- Political position: Centre; Historical: Centre to centre-left
- National affiliation: Advanced Indonesia Coalition Former: Coalition of Change for Unity; (2023–2024); Onward Indonesia Coalition; (2018–2023); Great Indonesia Coalition; (2014–2018); Joint Secretariat; (2009–2014); People's Coalition; (2004–2009); Central Axis; (1999–2004)
- International affiliation: Centrist Democrat International
- Regional affiliation: Council of Asian Liberals and Democrats; Asia Pacific Democracy Union
- Slogan: Solusi Bangsa ('Nation's Solution')
- Anthem: "Hymne PKB" ('PKB Hymn') "Mars PKB" ('PKB March')
- Ballot number: 1
- DPR seats: 68 / 580
- DPRD I seats: 220 / 2,372
- DPRD II seats: 1,833 / 17,510

Website
- pkb.id

The National Awakening Party (Indonesian: Partai Kebangkitan Bangsa; lit. 'Party of the Nation's Awakening', PKB), is an centrist Islam-based political party in Indonesia. It is also the party of the former Vice President of Indonesia, Ma'ruf Amin, who was elected to its Shura Council.

The party was founded in 1999 by the traditionalist strand of Muslim society in Indonesia, which overlaps with the membership of Nahdlatul Ulama. The party is described as a nationalist Muslim party, which promotes inclusive and nationalist principles and upholds Pancasila doctrine.

In 2014, the party obtained 9.04 percent of the popular vote, which is an increase from 4.95 percent in 2009 but lower than 10.57 percent in 2004. The party is currently led by Muhaimin Iskandar.

== Origins ==
The PKB was established on 11 May 1998. Kyai (religious scholars), held a meeting at the Langitan Pesantren (Islamic boarding school) to discuss several problems facing Indonesia they deemed to be critical. They developed an official statement, which Kyai Muchid Muzadi of Jember and Gus Yusuf Muhammad, were sent to deliver to President Suharto. Before they were able to deliver the statement, however, Suharto resigned on 21 May 1998.

On 30 May 1998, the Kyai held a grand meeting, or Istighosah, at the office of the East Java branch of the Nahdlatul Ulama (NU) Islamic organization. The meeting resulted in KH Cholil Bisri being urged to form a party based on the NU's political aspirations. After initially resisting their request, due to his desire to continue his work with the pesantren, Bisri eventually relented and accepted the leadership role.

A week later, on 6 June, Bisri met the Kyai in order to discuss the formation of the new party. Invitations had been sent via telephone, and more than 200 Kyai attended the meeting, which was held in Bisri's home in Leteh, Rembang, Central Java. This meeting resulted in the formation of the "Standing Committee", consisting of 11 people, with Bisri as chairman and Gus Yus as secretary. In turn, this committee worked in a marathon session, preparing a platform and party components, including the logos which would become the party's symbol. The logos were created by KH A. Mustofa Bisri.

The Standing Committee and representatives of the NU held a major conference in Bandung, on 4 July 1998, which was attended by 27 regional representatives. In a discussion regarding the name of the organization, the proposed names were the "National Awakening Party", the "Nahdlatul Ummah Awakening Party" and the "Ummah Party". The name chosen was "Partai Kebangkitan Bangsa" (PKB) meaning "National Awakening Party". The party's declaratory was 72 people, representing the age of the NU organization, consisting of the Standing Committee Team (11), the Lajnah Assistance Team (14), Team NU (5), the NU Assistance Team (7), and two Representatives from each of the 27 regions (27 x 2). The 72 founders signed the Party's Platform and its components.

Subsequent to this, however, the PBNU decided that only five people could become the party's declaratory. Those five were Kyai Munasir Ali, Kyai Ilyas Ruchiyat, Kyai Muchid Muzadi, KH A. Mustofa Bisri and KH Abddurahman Wahid, who was the chairman of the PBNU. The 72 names of the party's original declaratory were erased by the PBNU.

The party's base of support is strongest in Java Island and draws from the constituency that formerly supported the conservative Muslim organization NU. The PKB differs from Nahdlatul Ulama in that while it supports a role for Islam in government, it does not share the older organization's support for an explicitly Islamic republic.

== Chairpersons ==
No.	Name	Potrait	Constituency / title	Term of office		Time tenure	Election results
No.	Name	Potrait	Constituency / title	Took office	Left office	Time tenure	Election results
General Chairmen of the National Awakening Party (1998–present)
1	Matori Abdul Djalil (1942-2007)		Central Java	23 July 1998	21 July 2001 (Note: In July 2001, Matori Abdul Djalil was removed from his position as party chairman by Abdurrahman Wahid, the Chairman of the Shura Council. He didn't immediately accept the decision and claimed his term would remain until the next congress. Djalil's camp also opposed this by holding an extraordinary congress to re-establish Djalil's name as the party leader with Abdul Khaliq Ahmad on 16 January 2002. The conflict ended when the Djalil's camp was declared not to have the right to be part of the PKB functionaries by the court on 3 October 2002. His camp finally decide to founded a new political party named Democratic Victorius Party (Pekade).)	2 years, 363 days	2000 Unopposed
–	Alwi Shihab (born 1946) Interim leader		–	23 July 2001	20 January 2002	181 days	
2	Alwi Shihab (born 1946)		Coordinating Minister for People's Welfare (Note: since 21 October 2004)	20 January 2002 (Note: Since October 2002, Shihab's leadership has been legally legitimized to lead the party until the next congress.)	10 April 2005 (Note: Based on the results obtained at the plenary meetings dated 21 September 2004 and 26 October 2004, Shihab was removed from his position as party leader considering the new duties he was carrying out in the government in the United Indonesia Cabinet as Coordinating Minister for People's Welfare.)	3 years, 80 days	2002 1st Round Alwi Shihab – 268; Saifullah Yusuf – 229; Marzuki Usman – 20; Andi Jamal – 14; Muhammad Atho'illah Shohibul Hikam – 10 2002 2nd Round Unopposed walkover
–	Mahfud MD (born 1957) Acting		Rep for East Java X	26 October 2004	19 April 2005	175 days	
3	Muhaimin Iskandar (born 1966)		Rep for East Java VIII (Note: until 30 September 2024); Coordinating Minister for Social Empowerment (Note: since 21 October 2024)	10 April 2005	Incumbent	21 years, 219 days	2005 Muhaimin Iskandar – 304; Ali Masykur Musa – 27; Saifullah Yusuf – 26; Mahfud MD – 2 2008 Muhaimin Iskandar – 375; Andi Muawiyah Ramli – 20; Jhon Ramadhan – 7 Nursyahbani Katjasungkana – 2 Tohir – 1 Helmy Faishal – 1 Fahromi – 1 Abdul Kadir Karding – 1 2013 1-year extension 2014 Unopposed 2019 Unopposed 2024 Unopposed

== General elections ==
The National Awakening Party stood in the 1999 elections, winning 13 percent of the votes. In the 2004 elections, the party gained 10.57% (11,989,564) of votes and 52 seats in the People's Representative Council. However, the party won only 4.9 percent of the votes in the 2009 legislative election, and 27 seats in the legislature.

== Policies ==
According to the party website, the party's policies are to:

- Strengthen democracy to increase the prosperity of people living in villages
- Strengthen the protection of farmers and fishermen
- Accelerate the development of disadvantaged regions
- Make labourers prosperous
- Increase the involvement of women in strategic sectors

For the 2014 elections, the party plans to focus more intensively on its policies related to villages, in particular such as village representation, the allocation of funding for villages and the development of education and health facilities.

== 2024 Planned Takeover by Nahdlatul Ulama ==
The relationship between National Awakening Party and Nahdlatul Ulama worsened due to differences in political stance during 2024 Indonesian general election. Since Muhaimin Iskandar's loss in the election, the party increasingly distanced itself from Nahdlatul Ulama and often took actions that disadvantage Nahdlatul Ulama's political interests. Due to this, Nahdlatul Ulama Central Committee announced plans for taking over the National Awakening Party leadership on 26 July 2024.

== Election results ==
=== Legislative election results ===
Election	Ballot number	Leader	Seats		Total votes	Share of votes	Outcome of election
Election	Ballot number	Leader	No.	±	Total votes	Share of votes	Outcome of election
1999	35	Matori Abdul Jalil	51 / 462		13,336,982	12.61%	Governing coalition
2004	15	Alwi Shihab	52 / 550	▲1	11,989,564	10.57%	Governing coalition
2009	13	Muhaimin Iskandar	28 / 560	▼24	5,146,302	4.94%	Governing coalition
2014	2	Muhaimin Iskandar	47 / 560	▲19	11,298,957	9.04%	Governing coalition
2019	1	Muhaimin Iskandar	58 / 575	▲11	13,570,097	9.69%	Governing coalition
2024	1	Muhaimin Iskandar	68 / 580	▲10	16,115,358	10.62%	Governing coalition

=== Presidential election results ===
Election	Ballot number	Candidate	Running mate	1st round (Total votes)	Share of votes	Outcome	2nd round (Total votes)	Share of votes	Outcome
2004	4	Susilo Bambang Yudhoyono	Jusuf Kalla	39,838,184	33.57%	**Runoff**	69,266,350	60.62%	Elected
2009	2	Susilo Bambang Yudhoyono	Boediono	73,874,562	60.80%	Elected			
2014	2	Joko Widodo	Jusuf Kalla	70,997,833	53.15%	Elected			
2019	1	Joko Widodo	Ma'ruf Amin	85,607,362	55.50%	Elected			
2024	1	Anies Baswedan	**Muhaimin Iskandar**	40,971,906	24.95%	Lost			

Note: Bold text indicates the party member

== List of deputy speakers of the People's Representative Council from PKB ==
#	Portrait	Deputy speaker	Assumed office	Left office	Time in office	Serving with	Speaker	Term
1		Khofifah Indar Parawansa	6 October 1999	28 October 1999	22 days	Hamzah Haz	Akbar Tandjung	14
1		Khofifah Indar Parawansa	6 October 1999	28 October 1999	22 days	A.M. Fatwa	Akbar Tandjung	14
2		Muhaimin Iskandar	28 October 1999	1 October 2004	4 years, 339 days	Tosari Widjaja	Akbar Tandjung	14
2		Muhaimin Iskandar	28 October 1999	1 October 2004	4 years, 339 days	A.M. Fatwa	Akbar Tandjung	14
2		Muhaimin Iskandar	1 October 2004	1 October 2009	5 years, 0 days	Soetardjo Soerjogoeritno	Agung Laksono	15
2		Muhaimin Iskandar	1 October 2004	1 October 2009	5 years, 0 days	Zaenal Ma'arif (2004–2007)	Agung Laksono	15
2		Muhaimin Iskandar	1 October 2019	1 October 2024	5 years, 0 days	Azis Syamsuddin (2019–2021)	Puan Maharani	18
2		Muhaimin Iskandar	1 October 2019	1 October 2024	5 years, 0 days	Lodewijk F. Paulus (2021–2024)	Puan Maharani	18
2		Muhaimin Iskandar	1 October 2019	1 October 2024	5 years, 0 days	Sufmi Dasco Ahmad	Puan Maharani	18
2		Muhaimin Iskandar	1 October 2019	1 October 2024	5 years, 0 days	Rachmad Gobel	Puan Maharani	18
3		Cucun Ahmad Syamsurijal	1 October 2024	Incumbent	2 years, 45 days	Adies Kadir	Puan Maharani	19
3		Cucun Ahmad Syamsurijal	1 October 2024	Incumbent	2 years, 45 days	Sufmi Dasco Ahmad	Puan Maharani	19
3		Cucun Ahmad Syamsurijal	1 October 2024	Incumbent	2 years, 45 days	Saan Mustopa	Puan Maharani	19

Colour key

- United Development Party (PPP)
- National Mandate Party (PAN)
- Party of Functional Groups (Golkar)
- Indonesian Democratic Party of Struggle (PDI-P)
- Reform Star Party (PBR)
- Great Indonesia Movement Party (Gerindra)
- NasDem Party

== See also ==
- List of Islamic political parties
