= Zaenal =

Zaenal is a given name. Notable people with the name include:

- Zaenal Arief (born 1981), Indonesian footballer
- Zaenal Ma'arif (1955–2023), Indonesian lecturer and politician
