= Tauhid (film) =

- Directed by: Asrul Sani
- Written by: Asrul Sani
- Starring: M. E. Zainuddin; Ismed M. Noor; Aedy Moward
- Cinematography: Sjamsuddin Jusuf
- Edited by: Cassim Abbas
- Music by: Don A. R. Garcia
- Release date: 1966 (Indonesia)
- Country: Indonesia
- Language: Indonesian

Tauhid is a 1966 Indonesian drama film directed by Asrul Sani. Starring M. E. Zainuddin, Ismed M. Noor, and Aedy Moward, it follows the spiritual journeys of an author and a doctor during their hajj pilgrimage. Produced with an announced budget of several million rupiah and supported by the Sukarno government, Tauhid was intended to document the hajj pilgrimage while simultaneously presenting a view of Islam that supported the regime's Nasakom ideology. The film, shot on location in Mecca with the support of the Saudi Arabian government, was a commercial failure upon release.

== Plot ==
The writer Muhammad Amin (M. E. Zainuddin) announces at a press conference at Hotel Indonesia that his next work will explore the beauty of the hajj pilgrimage. When he is unable to answer questions about the pilgrimage, reporters question his ability to realize this goal. Nevertheless, with financial support from the Indonesian government, Amin departs on the pilgrimage, being joined by his friend Major Mursjid (Ismed M. Noor) at Tanjung Priok.

Aboard the ship, the two encounter Dr. Halim (Aedy Moward), a sceptic who openly questions the value of the hajj. Recognizing that the doctor's pronouncements have created unrest aboard the ship, Amin debates Halim while also maintaining the peace. After an elderly patient dies despite his best efforts, Halim begins to struggle with his certainty in medicine over faith. He ultimately decides to undertake the hajj.

The pilgrims disembark in Jeddah, then travel overland to Mecca. Witnessing the enormous crowds circumambulating the Kaaba, Halim reflects on his religion while at the same time feeling like an outsider. After a discussion with an Indonesian living in Saudi Arabia, Halim comes to perceive the hajj not as a complete journey but as a beginning of a righteous life. He discusses this with Amin, who agrees to write his book through this framing.

== Production ==
The concept for Tauhid emerged within Lesbumi, a group of cultural actors associated with the Islamic organization Nahdlatul Ulama that actively promoted Islam as a basis for art. Djamaluddin Malik, an established filmmaker, proposed using the hajj as the basis for a film. This idea was embraced by two Lesbumi members, Asrul Sani and Misbach Yusa Biran, who each developed a screenplay based on the idea. For support, they reached out to the Indonesian government.

Both items gained the support of the Sukarno regime. In the 1960s, President Sukarno sought to consolidate his power and reaffirm his support from Indonesia's Muslim community. He thus directed several government ministries—the Ministry of Religious Affairs, the Ministry of Information, and the Ministry of Home Affairs—to support these films. This was seen to reinforce his concept of Nasakom, a combination of nationalism, religion, and communism, his assertion that "humanity is one", and his anti-imperialist position during the Cold War, thereby promoting "the revolutionary ethos of the time". Tauhid was one of numerous films produced through government–private partnerships in Sukarno-era Indonesia.

Production of Tauhid was initially scheduled for 1963. However, after a series of delays, production only began in 1964, with a budget announced to be several million rupiah. Regarding the film's approach to Islam, Sani wrote that he sought to present the film "in the form of a journal entry" rather than as a typical drama. Sani served as director, with Biran as assistant director. Cinematography was handled by Sjamsuddin Jusuf, with editing by Cassim Abbas. Sound editing was handled by E. Sambas and Kemal Redha, with music by Don A. R. Garcia. The filmmaker Usmar Ismail served as a technical consultant.

Tauhid starred M. E. Zainuddin as Muhammad Amin, Ismed M. Noor as Mursyid, and Aedy Moward as Halim. It also featured Rd. Mochtar, Sukarsih, Mansjur Sjah, and Nurbani Yusuf. Sani had a small role in the film as the Indonesian migrant who inspires Halim. Scenes for Tauhid were shot on location in Mecca, Saudi Arabia. Biran later recalled that the crew was provided ready access to diverse sites and comfortable accommodations, as well as Saudi licence plates. They were allowed to film scenes at the Masjid al-Haram in Mecca and the Masjid Nabawi in Medina, though certain parts of these mosques were closed to them.

== Release and reception ==
After being screened during the Afro-Asian Islamic festival in 1965, Tauhid was released theatrically in 1966. Screenings were limited, and commercial reception was tepid. Few reviews were published, though the Communist Party of Indonesia did actively denounce the film as religious propaganda. Tauhid soon faded into obscurity.

Writing in 2008, Biran attributed this failure to the film's themes being difficult for the average viewer; the political turmoil that accompanied the collapse of the Sukarno regime also likely contributed. Sani, however, continued to work on films exploring modern Islamic living through the 1990s, with his 1977 screenplay Al Kautsar the first commercially successful Indonesian film focused on Islam. A 35 mm copy of Tauhid is held by Sinematek Indonesia. The archive also holds an electronic copy. The Indonesian film critic Eric Sasono describes it as being of poor quality, with varying audio levels.

== Works cited ==
- "Daftar Lengkap Pemeran dan Kru Tauhid" [Full List of Cast and Crew for Tauhid]. filmindonesia.or.id (in Indonesian). Konfiden Foundation. Archived from the original on 15 March 2026.
- Izharuddin, Alicia (2016). Gender and Islam in Indonesian Cinema. Springer. ISBN 978-981-10-2173-2.
- Salim HS, Hairus (2012). "Indonesian Muslims and Cultural Networks". In Sutedja-Liem, Maya (ed.). Heirs to World Culture: Being Indonesian, 1950-1965. Leiden: Brill. pp. 75–119. ISBN 978-90-04-25351-3.
- Sasono, Eric (2024). "Islam and the Cultural Cold War: Tauhid and the Quest for the Modern Muslim". In Lee, Sangjoon; Espena, Darlene (eds.). Remapping the Cold War in Asian Cinemas. Amsterdam University Press. pp. 93–108. doi:10.2307/jj.16394403.8. ISBN 978-94-6372-727-3. JSTOR jj.16394403.8.
- "Tauhid" [Oneness]. filmindonesia.or.id (in Indonesian). Konfiden Foundation. Archived from the original on 15 March 2026.
- Lin, Hongxuan (2023). Ummah yet Proletariat: Islam, Marxism, and the Making of the Indonesian Republic. Oxford: Oxford University Press. doi:10.1093/oso/9780197657386.001.0001. ISBN 978-0-19-765738-6.
