= Fatahillah (film) =

- Theatrical poster
- Directed by: Imam Tantowi; Chaerul Umam
- Written by: Misbach Yusa Biran
- Screenplay by: Misbach Yusa Biran
- Produced by: Johan Tjasmadi; Soerjadi Soedirdja
- Starring: Igo Ilham; Abdi Wiyono; Linda Jatmika; Yuni Sulistyawati
- Release date: June 11, 1997 (Indonesia)
- Running time: 122 minutes
- Country: Indonesia
- Language: Indonesian
- Budget: Rp 3 billion

Fatahillah is a 1997 Indonesian historical drama film directed by Imam Tantowi and Chaerul Umam. Based on the life of Fatahillah and the establishment of Jakarta, the film starred Igo Ilham in the title role as well as Abdi Wiyono, Linda Jatmika, and Yuni Sulistyawati. It narrates the story of a man from the Samudera Pasai Sultanate who allies with the Demak Sultanate to remove the Portuguese empire from Sunda Kelapa.

Produced with a budget of Rp 3 billion (US$1.2 million), Fatahillah was intended simultaneously to stimulate the stagnant Indonesian film industry and celebrate the 470th anniversary of Jakarta. Premiering on 11 June 1997 and widely released nine days later, Fatahillah was a commercial failure despite extensive marketing and high hopes. Critical reception was negative, with several reviewers considering the film's treatment of Islam as overly combative.

== Plot ==
After the destruction of the Samudera Pasai Sultanate, Fatahillah (Igo Ilham) allies with Sultan Trenggana of Demak (Abdi Wiyono). He is received well as a warrior and as a religious leader, and shortly takes two wives: the sultan's sister Ratu Pembayun (Linda Jatmika) and the widow Ratu Ayu (Yuni Sulistyawati). Demak soon marches against the Portuguese empire forces in Sunda Kelapa in western Java, with Fatahillah in command. The Portuguese forces are routed, and a new city is established.

== Production ==
=== Context ===
In the 1990s, the Indonesian film industry experienced a sharp decline. Many industry workers and production houses focused on television, which offered larger returns with a faster turnaround time. Meanwhile, the American Film Exporters Association aggressively marketed films from the United States, and thus Indonesian cinemas predominantly screened Hollywood imports. Of domestic films released, many were soft pornography, bearing titles such as Kenikmatan Tabu (Taboo Pleasure, 1994), Gairah Terlarang (Forbidden Lust, 1995), and Nafsu dalam Cinta (Lust in Love, 1995). The Indonesian government, facing criticism for allowing such prevalent nudity, implemented several measures to stimulate production and attract audiences.

In this context, Fatahillah was presented as the film that would restore faith in the industry. It received extensive funding from the Jakarta government, which raised money through the taxes levied on cinema tickets, and sought to also use the film to celebrate the city's upcoming 470th anniversary. Such government support for films with religious themes was rare in Indonesia. Despite the country being Muslim-majority, the Suharto government had had a strained relationship with the Muslim community, only beginning a rapprochement in the late 1980s. Further funding came from the All-Indonesia Alliance of Cinema Companies..

=== Filming ===
Fatahillah was directed by Imam Tantowi and Chaerul Umam, based on a screenplay by Misbach Yusa Biran. Umam had extensive experience working on films with Islamic themes, while Biran was recognized as a devout Muslim. Johan Tjasmadi served as producer; Soerjadi Soedirdja, then the governor of Jakarta, also received a producer credit. Cinematography was done by M. Soleh Ruslani and Thomas Susanto, with sound production handled by Hartanto. Rizal Basri edited the film. Minister of Information Harmoko acted as guest director for one day.

The story for Fatahillah was based on the life of Fatahillah, a historical figure who had expelled Portuguese forces in Sunda Kelapa and established Jayakarta—literally the "City of Victory"—the precursor to Jakarta. The film emphasized the role of Islam in the conflict, featuring the takbir as well as an on-screen quotation from the Qur'an. Abu Ridho, an ustad associated with the Prosperous Justice Party, served as an advisor on the film, and Soedirdja emphasized not only the importance of revolution but also faith in pre-release press briefings.

Due to the religious themes of the film, the directors avoided hiring an established actor, fearful that such an actor could potentially appear in pornographic fare afterwards. As the main character Fatahillah, they cast Igo Ilham, a 27-year-old ustad (religious scholar). Further leading roles were taken by Abdi Wiyono, Linda Jatmika, and Yuni Sulistyawati, with supporting roles taken by actors such as Syamsuri Kaempuan and Maulana Husni. Including extras, more than 2,500 persons appeared in the film.

Filming for Fatahillah began on 16 November 1996, Shooting took place on location, mostly in the Indramayu and Cirebon areas of West Java, and was initially expected to last three months. The film was produced concurrently with a television series, which was intended for screening six months after Fatahillah's release, during the Ramadan holidays. The dual-production of film and series inflated expenses, as did the delays caused by filming scenes during the rainy season. As such, although the budget for Fatillah was initially announced as Rp 2.5 billion, it ultimately cost Rp 3 billion (US$1.2 million). This was the largest budget of any Indonesian production up to that point.

== Release and reception ==
Fatahillah premiered on 11 June 1997, with a wide release in 23 Indonesian cities following on 20 June. Releases for neighbouring Brunei, Malaysia, Thailand, and Singapore were scheduled for August. Public servants were mobilized as audiences, and some schools held screenings for students.

Critical reviews of Fatahillah were predominantly negative. The film critic Salim Said, who served concurrently as chairman of the Jakarta Arts Council, described it as without personality. The reviewer for The Jakarta Post praised the film's special effects, but criticized the characters as underdeveloped and the performances as wooden. However, recognizing the "aggressive" marketing undertaken by the film, the reviewer suggested that viewers may be interested in watching something other than soft pornography. Reviewing for the Asian Wall Street Journal, Margot Cohen questioned the message of the film, which she felt ill-suited to contemporary religious tensions. She wrote that "the movie's anti-colonial theme gets mixed up with an us-versus-them approach to religion", with efforts to emphasize tolerance less prominent than distrust for non-Muslims. The reviewer for Asiaweek wrote that Fatahillah prioritized its moral authority, coming across "almost as a religious crusade". Critics urged the government to avoid promoting the film at film festivals "to avoid embarrassment".

Despite high expectations, Fatahillah was commercially unsuccessful, and the Indonesian film industry remained stagnant. It only began a resurgence in the 2000s, with films such as Petualangan Sherina (Sherina's Adventure, 2000) and Ada Apa dengan Cinta? (What's Up with Love?, 2002) receiving more than one million viewers. Following the failure of Fatahillah, Umam did not direct another film until 2009's Ketika Cinta Bertasbih (When Love Prays). Meanwhile, screenwriter Biran excluded the film from his 2008 biography. The film scholar Thomas Barker highlights Fatahillah and its failure as evidence of New Order hubris and financial mismanagement. Discussing Islamic cinema with Tempo magazine, filmmaker Asrul Sani suggested that Fatahillah erred in prioritizing history over making "people wonder and stimulat[ing] them to question things that exist in history or real life".

== Works cited ==
- "Asrul Sani: Films Can Never Replace the Function of 'Kiais'". Tempo. Jakarta. 12 November 2000. ProQuest 198872479 – via ProQuest.
- Barker, Thomas (2019). Indonesian Cinema after the New Order: Going Mainstream. Hong Kong University Press. ISBN 978-988-8528-07-3.
- "Big Budget 'Fatahillah' Is in the Spirit of Islam". The Jakarta Post. Jakarta. 22 June 1997. ProQuest 288097815 – via ProQuest.
- "Cinema: Betting on a Defender of the Faith: A Tepid Bid to Fire Up Indonesia's Film Industry". Asiaweek. Hong Kong. 7 August 1997. ProQuest 228609953 – via ProQuest.
- Cohen, Margot (March 1997). "Climate of Distrust". Asian Wall Street Journal. 26 (2): 39–43.
- Cohen, Margot (20 June 1997). "Cinema: Indonesia Screens a Holy War". Asian Wall Street Journal. Hong Kong. p. 11. ProQuest 315614489 – via ProQuest.
- "City Museums Are Not Best Place to Learn about Fatahillah". The Jakarta Post. Jakarta. 22 June 1997. ProQuest 288107421 – via ProQuest.
- "Daftar Lengkap Pemeran dan Kru Fatahillah" [Full List of Cast and Crew for Fatahillah]. filmindonesia.or.id (in Indonesian). Konfiden Foundation. Archived from the original on 11 March 2026.
- "Fatahillah". filmindonesia.or.id (in Indonesian). Konfiden Foundation. Archived from the original on 11 March 2026.
- "Film Fatahillah Dibuat Dengan Dana Rp 2,5 Miliar" [Film Fatahillah to Be Made with Rp 2.5 Billion]. Suara Pembaruan (in Indonesian). 17 November 1996. Archived from the original on 29 December 1996.
- Imanjaya, Ekky (2009). "The Anomalous Islamic Movies and Other Recent Issues as Representation of Muslim World In Post-New Order Indonesian Cinema". Komunikologi. 6 (2): 189–195. doi:10.47007/jkomu.v6i2.89 (inactive 28 February 2026).
- Kurniasari, Triwik (27 December 2009). "Cinema Comes Out of the Dark Ages". The Jakarta Post. Archived from the original on 29 March 2010.
- "No Escape from Hollywood for Local Moviegoers". The Jakarta Post. Jakarta. 27 December 1997. p. 1. ProQuest 288090449 – via ProQuest.
- "Indonesian Films Show Signs of Hope". The Jakarta Post. Jakarta. 30 March 1997. ProQuest 288034110 – via ProQuest.
- Sidarto, Linawati (5 July 1997). "Hugely Hyped Film Caned: 'It's Pathetic'". The Sydney Morning Herald. Sydney. p. 21.
- Wijaya, Callistasia Anggun (4 December 2017). "Closure Marks End of Analog Film Projector Era". The Jakarta Post. Jakarta. Archived from the original on 11 March 2026.
- Yazid, Nauval (14 June 2009). "'Ketika Cinta Bertasbih': Offers Picturesque Views – and Nothing Else". The Jakarta Post. Jakarta. Archived from the original on 11 March 2026.
