= Bakdi Soemanto =

Indonesian writer, poet, playwright, editor, and professor

- Born: Christoporus Soebakdi Soemanto; October 29, 1940; Surakarta, Central Java
- Died: October 11, 2014 (aged 73); Yogyakarta
- Occupations: writer, professor, editor, poet, playwright
- Writing career
- Pen name: Bakdi Soemanto
- Language: Indonesian
- Genre: Poetry

C. Soebakdi Soemanto (widely known as Bakdi Soemanto; 29 October 1941 – 11 October 2014) was an Indonesian writer, poet, playwright, editor, and professor at the Faculty of Cultural Sciences, Gadjah Mada University (UGM), Yogyakarta.

He began his studies at the English Literature Program of UGM (1977), continuing in the American Studies Program at the University of Indonesia (1982).

Aside from UGM, he worked at IKIP Sanata Dharma (1971–1979), Akademi Kewanitaan Yogyakarta (1976–1979), Akademi Bahasa Asing Kumendaman Yogyakarta (1979–1982), the Faculty of Literature at Sebelas Maret University (1979–1982), and also at Oberlin College of the Northern Illinois University (1986–1987). He was also editor of the magazines Basis (1965–1967), Mahasiswa Indonesia (Central Java edition; 1966–1969), Peraba (1971–1976), and Semangat (1975–1979).

He wrote about contemporaries Rendra in 2003 and Sapardi Djoko Damono in 2006.

At the end of his career, he served as professor emeritus at the Faculty of Cultural Sciences, Gadjah Mada University, Yogyakarta. He died on 11 October 2014.

== Works ==
- Dari Kartu Natal ke Doktor Plimin (short story collection, 1979)
- Maling (1994)
- Angan-Angan Budaya Jawa: Analisis Semiotik Pengakuan Pariyem (1999)
- Cerita rakyat Yogyakarta 1 & 2 & 3 (1999)
- Cerita rakyat Surakarta 1 & 2 (1999)
- Jagat Teater – (2000)
- The Magician – (2001)
- Godot di Amerika dan Indonesia, (2002)
- Doktor Plimin, kumpulan Cerpen, (2003)
- Mincuk, Kumpulan cerpen (2004)
- Rendra: Karyadan Dunianya, (2003)
- Sapardi Djoko Damono: karya dan dunianya,(2006)
- Majalah Dinding, kumpulan drama, ( 2006)
- Kata, kumpulan puisi (2006)
- Rubaiat Terlarang Rumi (2006)
- Sri Sumarah, Pariyem, dan Bu Bei (2008)
