= Al Kautsar (film) =

- Handbill
- Directed by: Chaerul Umam
- Written by: Chan Pattimura
- Screenplay by: Asrul Sani
- Produced by: Chan Pattimura
- Starring: Rendra; Henny Kundhalini; Wahab Abdi; Soultan Saladin
- Cinematography: Kasiyo
- Edited by: Janis Badar
- Music by: Thoifur Syairozi
- Production company: Sippang Jaya Film
- Release date: 1977 (Indonesia)
- Running time: 106 minutes
- Country: Indonesia

Al Kautsar, also rendered Al-Kautsar, is a 1977 Indonesian dakwah (proselytization) film directed by Chaerul Umam. Starring Rendra, Henny Kundhalini, Wahab Abdi, and Soultan Saladin, it follows a young Javanese santri named Saiful who is sent to a remote village to preach Islam and promote modern agriculture. Despite numerous trials, which culminate in him being accused of zina (fornication) and forced to flee the village, Saiful is able to bring change to the village and gain the respect of its residents.

Released during the New Order regime, Al Kautsar was one of few contemporary Indonesian films with explicitly Islamic themes. These themes were emphasized heavily in advertising, and the film was well regarded by Indonesia's Muslim middle class. The film has been analysed within the context of Islam in Indonesia, with a particular focus on its depiction of modern Islam as well as the fashion markers used by its male and female characters. The film won Best Sound Direction at the 1977 Asian Film Festival.

== Plot ==
Saiful Bachri (Rendra) arrives at the village of Sekarlangit, where he has been sent to preach Islam and help develop agriculture, from Java. Initially, he is opposed by Haji Musa (Wisnu Wardhana), a local religious leader, and Harun, a strongman. He also attracts the attention of Halimah, a woman whose husband was killed by Harun.

Halimah joins Saiful teaching at the madrasa. Angered that he has not drawn her romantic attention, Harun and his lackey Sutan begin spreading lies about her and Saiful. When this fails, Harun unsuccessfully attempts to kill Saiful during a hunting trip. His attempts to create strife are successful the third time: Saiful performs CPR on Halimah after she nearly drowns in a new irrigation canal, which Harun casts as zina (fornication).

The angered villagers destroy Saiful's madrasa, despite Musa's attempts to stop them, and run him out of the village. Sutan, ostracized after he is caught stealing money from the local mosque to pay for his mother's medical treatment, soon meets with him. The two witness Harun attempting to rape Halimah, and an angered Sutan razes a rice storage site owned by Harun. The former partners fight amidst the burning warehouse, but are saved by Saiful after they atone. Saiful reunites with his beloved Nur, who is found to be the daughter of Haji Musa. (Note: Synopsis based on the summary provided by the Indonesian Film Catalogue (Filmindonesia.or.id, Al Kautsar).)

== Production ==
Al Kautsar was directed by Chaerul Umam based on a screenplay by Asrul Sani. It was produced by Chan Pattimura, who also provided the original story, for Sippang Jaya Film. Cinematography was handled by Kasiyo, with artistic direction by LD Fatmah and music by Thoifur Syairozi. Janis Badar handled editing. In his music direction, Syairozi incorporated elements of salawat; the soundtrack also extensively used recordings of dhikr (remembrances) to signify major plot events.

The film starred Rendra as Saiful Bachri, Henny Kundhalini as Halimah, Wahab Abdi as Sutan, and Soultan Saladin as Harun. Supporting roles were held by Wisnu Wardhana, Bagong Kussudiardjo, Yulinar Firdaus, and Sunarti Rendra. Rendra, best known as a poet, appeared in several films during this period; others included Yang Muda Yang Bercinta (The Young Make Love, 1977) and Terminal Cinta (Terminal of Love, 1977).

Al Kautsar was named after Surah Al-Kawthar, the 108th surah (chapter) of the Qur'an. It is understood to refer to the River of Abundance in Jannah, from which one may drink and never again feel thirst. Films with explicitly Islamic themes had been rare in contemporary Indonesian cinema, with the most recently released being Asrul Sani's Tauhid (Oneness, 1964).

== Analysis ==
Al Kautsar was released during the New Order, under which themes of contemporary political Islam were disallowed. Films with religious themes released during the late 1970s instead dealt with the hajj pilgrimage, education, or Islam's contribution to Indonesian independence. The Indonesian film scholar Ekky Imanjaya notes that, as with other films with Islamic themes released in New Order Indonesia, Al Kautsar presented its subject matter not through the perspective of the local community in which it was set, but rather through an outsider's viewpoint. Similarly, as in many Islamic-themed films of the time, the female characters in Al Kautsar are depicted primarily in the domestic sphere.

The Indonesian film scholar Alicia Izharuddin writes that a sense of "nationalized masculinity", whereby a "correct" and modern Islam tames social disorder, is evident in Al Kautsar. She describes Sekarlangit as "cut off from modernity along with modern education", and thus being presented as requiring a transformative practical Islam taught by a strong and pious male leader. While being depicted as a man of faith, she writes, Saiful wears not traditional garb but a tailored shirt, trousers, and tie, thereby embodying "forward-looking values and worldly knowledge". This is contrasted with the older and more traditional Muslim leaders, who are less morally exemplary.

Examining the types of hijab presented in New Order-era Indonesian films, Wina Sumiati contrasts the characters Halimah and Nur. She writes that Nur, characterized as a santri from Java, is depicted as veiled more frequently than the non-Javanese Halimah. The type of hijab worn varies depending on activity; when Nur is participating in pesantren-related activities, she wears a hijab that covers her hair, while in her everyday activities her hair is partially exposed. The non-santri Halimah, meanwhile, tends to go unveiled during her everyday activities. Such tendencies, she writes, were common in New Order Indonesia, where veiling was uncommon.

== Release and reception ==
Al Kautsar was released in 1977. The film was targeted at Indonesia's Muslim middle class, with the intent of providing a modern yet religious experience. Advertising materials thus emphasized the film's Islamic themes, with handbills featuring a man sounding the adhan as well as well as a woman wearing a hijab. Other inclusions were the entirety of the Surah Al-Kawthar in Arabic script; phrases such as as-salamu alaykum ("Peace be with you") and Alhamdulillah ("Praise God"); as well as images of the Qur'an radiating light and the Istiqlal Mosque in Jakarta. At the same time, the advertisements welcomed non-Muslim viewers, with one quoting Teguh Karya as saying, "I'm a Christian, but I'm very proud to see this film. It's very good and not exclusively for Muslims, but for all religious persons."

Al Kautsar was a commercial success, with its screening at the first-class cinema in Menteng, Jakarta, lasting five weeks. Director Chaerul Umam recalled that many viewers had previously never watched a film at the cinema, with some of the most religious covering their eyes at seeing women's exposed shoulders on other films' posters. For Al Kautsar, Endang Darsono won Best Sound Direction at the 1977 Asian Film Festival.

Detik.com, in a 2009 retrospective, identified Al Kautsar as the first dakwah (Islamic proselytization) film to have found success in the Indonesian market. However, although some films with Islamic themes were released in subsequent years, the success of Al Kautsar did not result in dakwah films becoming popular. The film only received academic attention in the 2010s, which Izharuddin attributes to the popularity of the film Ayat-Ayat Cinta (Verses of Love, 2008). A VHS copy of the film is held by Sinematek Indonesia.

== Works cited ==
- "Al Kautsar". filmindonesia.or.id (in Indonesian). Konfiden Foundation. Archived from the original on 28 February 2026.
- "Al Kautsar, Film Religi Rendra yang Fenomenal" [Al Kautsar, Rendra's Phenomenal Religious Film]. Detik.com (in Indonesian). 7 August 2009. Archived from the original on 28 February 2026.
- "Daftar Lengkap Pemeran dan Kru Al Kautsar" [Complete List of Cast and Crew for Al Kautsar]. filmindonesia.or.id (in Indonesian). Konfiden Foundation. Archived from the original on 28 February 2026.
- Imanjaya, Ekky (2009). "The Anomalous Islamic Movies and Other Recent Issues as Representation of Muslim World In Post-New Order Indonesian Cinema". Komunikologi. 6 (2): 189–195. doi:10.47007/jkomu.v6i2.89 (inactive 28 February 2026).
- Izharuddin, Alicia (2015). "The Muslim Woman in Indonesian Cinema and the Face Veil as 'Other'". Indonesia and the Malay World. 43 (127): 397–412. doi:10.1080/13639811.2015.1033162.
- Izharuddin, Alicia (2016). Gender and Islam in Indonesian Cinema. Springer. ISBN 978-981-10-2173-2.
- "Penghargaan Al Kautsar" [Awards for Al Kautsar]. filmindonesia.or.id (in Indonesian). Konfiden Foundation. Archived from the original on 28 February 2026.
- Rachman, Yogi (1 September 2020). "Seni dan Jalan Hidup WS Rendra" [The Art and Life of WS Rendra]. Antara. Archived from the original on 28 February 2026.
- Sasono, Eric (11 September 2011). "Film Islam Indonesia Kini" [Indonesian Islamic Films Today]. Tempo (in Indonesian). p. 78.
- Setianto, Yearry Panji (2026). "Mediatization of Indonesian Islam: A Historical Examination of Media and Religious Change" (PDF). Religions. 17 (2): 170. doi:10.3390/rel17020170.
- Sumiati, Wina (2025). "Politik, Kerudung, dan Film Masa Orde Baru: Gambaran Perubahan Kerudung Dalam Film Islami Tahun 1977-1991". Metahumaniora. 15 (3): 214–222. doi:10.24198/metahumaniora.v15i3.63863.
- Woodrich, Christopher A. (2018). "Representing Islam in Indonesian Film Advertising during the Suharto Era (1966–1998) and Reform Era (1998–Present)". Komunikator. 10 (2): 60–74. doi:10.18196/jkm.101006.
