= Soerabaia 45 =

- Theatrical poster
- Directed by: Imam Tantowi
- Written by: Imam Tantowi
- Starring: Nyoman Swadayani; Sasetyo Wilutomo; Leo Kristi; Juari Sanjaya; Usman Effendy; Tuty Kusnandar
- Cinematography: Max J. Pakasi
- Edited by: Janis Badar
- Music by: Idris Sardi
- Distributed by: Sinar Permatamas Film
- Release date: 1990
- Running time: 123 minutes
- Country: Indonesia
- Language: Indonesian

Soerabaia 45 is an Indonesian film released in 1990. The film was directed by Imam Tantowi and starred Nyoman Swadayani, Leo Kristi, and Usman Effendy. The story of the film is based on the 1945 Battle of Surabaya between pro-independence Indonesian soldiers and militia against British and British Indian troops as a part of the Indonesian National Revolution.

The film was nominated for the Best Film award at the 1991 Indonesian Film Festival, and Tantowi won the Citra Award for Best Director at the 1991 Indonesian Film Festival for the film.
