= Ramadhan dan Ramona =

1992 film by Chaerul Umam

- Directed by: Chaerul Umam
- Written by: Putu Wijaya
- Produced by: Jamal Mirdad
- Starring: Djamal Mirdad; Lydia Kandou
- Cinematography: Harry Susanto
- Production company: PT Citra Wiwitan Film
- Release date: 1992
- Running time: 87 minutes
- Country: Indonesia
- Language: Indonesian language

Ramadhan dan Ramona is a 1992 Indonesian comedy film directed by Chaerul Umam. The film won five awards at the Indonesian Film Festival in 1993.

== Accolades ==
Award	Year	Category	Recipient	Result
Bandung Film Festival	1993	Director	Chaerul Umam	Nominated
Bandung Film Festival	1993	Honored Actress	Lydia Kandou	Won
Indonesian Film Festival	1993	Best Film		Won
Indonesian Film Festival	1993	Best Director	Chaerul Umam	Won
Indonesian Film Festival	1993	Best Screenplay	Putu Wijaya	Won
Indonesian Film Festival	1993	Best Lead Actor	Djamal Mirdad	Won
Indonesian Film Festival	1993	Best Lead Actress	Lydia Kandou	Won
Indonesian Film Festival	1993	Best Supporting Actor	Amak Baldjun	Nominated
Indonesian Film Festival	1993	Best Original Story	Putu Wijaya	Nominated
Indonesian Film Festival	1993	Best Photography Director	Harry Susanto	Nominated
Indonesian Film Festival	1993	Best Artistic	Teuku Rusian	Nominated
Indonesian Film Festival	1993	Best Editing	Effendi Doytha	Nominated
Indonesian Film Festival	1993	Best Music	Didi AGP	Nominated
