= Reform Star Party =

Political party in Indonesia

Reform Star Party Partai Bintang Reformasi
- Abbreviation: PBR
- Chairman: Bursah Zarnubi
- Secretary-General: Rusman Ali
- Founders: Zainuddin M. Z. Zaenal Ma'arif; Djafar Badjeber
- Founded: 20 January 2002; 24 years ago
- Dissolved: 18 February 2011; 15 years ago
- Split from: PPP
- Merged into: Gerindra
- Ideology: Islamism
- Political position: Right-wing
- National affiliation: People's Coalition (2004–2009)
- DPR (2009): 0 / 560

Website
- Official website

The Reform Star Party (Indonesian: Partai Bintang Reformasi, PBR) was a political party in Indonesia. The party was merged into the Great Indonesia Movement Party in 2011.

== Background ==
The party began as a movement within the United Development Party (PPP) to depose Vice-president Hamzah Haz from the chairmanship, which he held for the 1998–2003 term, as it was felt he would not have time to run the party and hold the vice-presidency. The movement's leader was Zainuddin MZ, an Islamic preacher and chairman of the party's central leadership. He and other dissatisfied party members planned to establish a new party to be called the PPP Reformasi (PPP Reform). After a meeting between the discontents and Hamzah Haz, Hamzah agreed to accommodate the demands of Zainuddin's group for a restructuring and regeneration of the PPP leadership. Zainuddin said he did not want to be responsible for the breakup of the PPP. A "Team of 7" was established to undertake the changes, but Zainuddin sent the PPP leadership a letter stating that he was not prepared to sit on the team as it was not in accordance with party rules. On January 8, 2002, Zainuddin resigned from the PPP and on January 20 declared the formation of the PPP Reformasi with a logo similar to that of the PPP but with five stars added. As the 2002 Election Law did not allow parties to use existing party names or symbols, the PPP Reformasi became the Reform Star Party with a new symbol.

The party was beset by internal conflict. As a result of tension between Zainuddin and Zaenal Ma'arif, two of the party's founders, an extraordinary party congress was held in April 2006. This saw the expulsion of Zaenal, who had wanted to become party chairman. Subsequently, other party members joined other parties, including Zainuddin himself, who joined the Great Indonesia Movement Party (Gerindra).

== Leaders ==
No.	Name	Potrait	Constituency / title	Term of office		Election results
No.	Name	Potrait	Constituency / title	Took office	Left office	Election results
Split from: United Development Party (Zainuddin's faction)
1	Zainuddin M. Z. (1952–2011)		—	20 January 2002	25 April 2006	2005 Unopposed
2	Bursah Zarnubi (born 1959)		Rep for South Sumatera II (Note: until 30 September 2009)	25 April 2006	18 February 2011	2006 Burzah Zarnubi – 211; Zaenal Ma'arif – 139; Djabar Badjeber – 71; Ade Daud Nasution – 32; Ismail Royan – 8
Merged into: Gerindra Party

== Electoral record ==
In the 2004 Indonesian legislative elections, the party won 2.4% of the popular vote and 14 out of 550 seats and established its own faction in the People's Representative Council. The party's target for the 2009 legislative election was 7 percent. However, it won only 1.2 percent of the votes, less than the 2.5 percent electoral threshold, meaning it lost all of its seats in the legislature.

=== Presidential election results ===
Election	Ballot number	Candidate	Running mate	1st round (Total votes)	Share of votes	Outcome	2nd round (Total votes)	Share of votes	Outcome
2004	3	Amien Rais	Siswono Yudo Husodo	17,392,931	14.66%	Eliminated	Runoff		
2009	2	Susilo Bambang Yudhoyono	Boediono	73,874,562	60.80%	Elected			

Note: Bold text indicates the party member

=== Legislative election results ===
Election	Ballot number	Leader	Total seats won	Seat change	Total votes	Share of votes	Outcome of election
2004	3	Zainuddin M. Z.	14 / 550		2.764.998	2.44%	Governing coalition
2009	27	Bursah Zarnubi	0 / 560	▼14	1.264.333	1.21%	Governing coalition

== See also ==
- List of Islamic political parties
