= Zaenal Ma'arif =

Indonesian academic and politician (1955–2023)

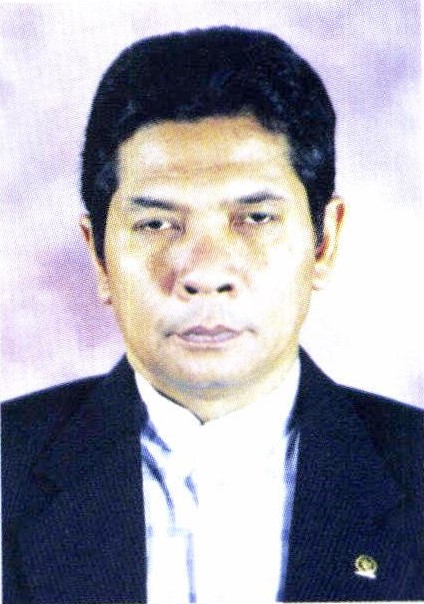

Deputy Speaker of the People's Representative Council
- In office 6 October 2004 – 28 December 2006
- Speaker: Agung Laksono

Member of the People's Representative Council
- In office 1 October 2004 – 31 July 2007
- President: Megawati Sukarnoputri; Susilo Bambang Yudhoyono
- Succeeded by: Junisab Akbar
- Constituency: North Sumatra I

Personal details
- Born: 14 September 1955 Surakarta, Central Java, Indonesia
- Died: 15 February 2023 (aged 67) Surakarta, Central Java, Indonesia
- Party: United Development (1989–2004); Reform Star (2004–2007); Democratic (2009–2011)
- Spouse(s): Rohanah Yanni Natalia Lodewijk (m. 2008)
- Education: Gadjah Mada University; Universitas Muhammadiyah Surakarta

Zaenal Ma'arif (14 September 1955 – 15 February 2023) was an Indonesian lecturer and politician who was a founding member of the Reform Star Party. He became the deputy speaker of the Surakarta city council from 1997 until 1999 and the deputy speaker of the People's Representative Council from 2004 until 2006.

== Early life and education ==
Zaenal was born on 14 September 1955 in Surakarta, Central Java, as the youngest of ten children. Zaenal began his studies at the Muslim Teacher's Elementary School in Surakarta and finished in 1967. He then continued at Muhammadiyah junior high school and high school, from which he graduated in 1971 and 1975.

After finishing his basic education, Zaenal moved to Yogyakarta and began studying law at the Gadjah Mada University (UGM). During his time in the university, Zaenal joined various student movements, such as the Muslim Students' Association, Union of Muhammadiyah Students, and Muhammadiyah Youth. He graduated in 1982 with a bachelor's degree in law.

== Career ==
After graduating from UGM, Zaenal began working as a private lawyer. In 1983, Zaenal was sent to Jakarta by his senior, Adnan Buyung Nasution, to act as defense counsel for Darul Islam leader Adah Djaelani Tirtapradja, who the government tried for subversion. In a later interview, Zaenal stated that the event was his first time visiting Jakarta.

After about two years, he stopped working as a lawyer due to a disagreement with his mother, who preferred him to work as a lecturer. Zaenal returned to Surakarta and began teaching law at the Surakarta Muhammadiyah University. He became the secretary to the university's rector in 1985 and served until 1992.

== Political career ==
Zaenal started his involvement in politics after he joined Surakarta's branch of the United Development Party (PPP) in 1989. He became the branch's legal counselor. He became the secretary of the branch several years later and was elected as a member of the Surakarta Regional People's Representative Council (the city council) in 1997. Zaenal openly encouraged Harmoko, the speaker of the People's Representative Council, to use the domestically-made Timor car as his official car instead of the Swedish-made Volvo. He also encouraged Surakarta citizens to stop paying their electric bills to the State Electricity Company.

Zaenal's term in the city council was supposed to end in 2002, but the political developments following the fall of Suharto forced elections to be held earlier in 1999. He was nominated as a Central Java Regional People's Representative Council member in the elections but was not elected. Around this period, he was promoted to become the deputy chairman of the PPP in Central Java. With his position, he successfully encouraged popular Islamic preacher Zainuddin M. Z. to join PPP.

In 2002, PPP experienced an internal conflict. PPP's chairman, Hamzah Haz, refused to hold a party conference due to its proximity to the 2004 election. Popular Islamic preacher and PPP administrator Zainuddin M.Z. disagreed with Hamzah and led the internal opposition against him. He and several leading members of PPP, including Zaenal, formed the Reformed United Development Party (PPP Reformasi), which later changed its name to Reform Star Party (PBR).

== Deputy Speaker of the People's Representative Council ==
Zaenal was nominated as a member of the People's Representative Council by PBR. Several PBR branches from different provinces had requested Zaenal to represent their constituency, but Zaenal decided to run from North Sumatra's 1st electoral district instead. He obtained 22,039 votes in the electoral district and was elected to the People's Representative Council. Zaenal was nominated as the deputy speaker of the People's Representative Council alongside Muhaimin Iskandar and Soetardjo Soerjogoeritno in an agreement between the leaders of several parliamentary parties. The People's Representative Council approved the nomination, and Zaenal was installed as deputy speaker on 6 October 2004. Zaenal was fired from his position as deputy speaker by PBR on 28 December 2006 and replaced as MP on 31 July 2007 following his second marriage with Yanni Natalia Lodewijk. PBR stated that the party "actively supported women's rights" and "strongly discouraged its members from committing polygamy".

== Death ==
Zaenal died at the Dr. Moewardi Hospital in Surakarta on 15 February 2023, at age 67. He was buried at his family's cemetery in Karanganyar Regency.
