= Imam Tantowi =

Indonesian film director (1946–2026)

- Born: 13 August 1946; Tegal, Central Java, Indonesia
- Died: 21 August 2026 (aged 80)
- Occupations: Film director, screenwriter
- Notable work: Soerabaia 45

Imam Tantowi (13 August 1946 – 21 August 2026) was an Indonesian film director and screenwriter. Tantowi was a stage director before he began to work in film, first as artistic director and later as assistant director. In 1982 he was given the opportunity to direct his first film, Pasukan Berani Mati (Ready-to-Die Force). In a career spanning six decades he has directed 18 feature films and written more than 30 scripts for the screen and for television.

Tantowi won the Citra Award for Best Original Screenplay at the 1989 Indonesian Film Festival for his film Si Badung. At the 1991 Indonesian Film Festival he won the Best Director award for his film Soerabaia 45. He won the Vidia Award at the 1996 Festival Sinetron Indonesia for his television series Suami-suami Takut Istri.

Tantowi died on 21 August 2026, at the age of 80.

== Filmography ==
=== As director ===
==== Film ====
- Pasukan Berani Mati (1982)
- Lebak in Flames (1983)
- Dia Sang Penakluk (1984)
- Carok (1985)
- Residivis (1985)
- Teroris (1986)
- Kelabang Seribu (1986)
- 7 Manusia Harimau (1986)
- Siluman Serigala Putih (1987)
- Saur Sepuh (Satria Madangkara) (1987)
- Saur Sepuh II (1988)
- Saur Sepuh III (1988)
- Si Badung (1989)
- Soerabaia 45 (1989)
- Saur Sepuh IV (1991)
- Fatahillah (1997)

=== As screenwriter ===
==== Film ====
- Ira Maya dan Kakek Ateng (1979)
- Nakalnya Anak-anak (1980)
- Primitif (1980)
- Jaka Sembung (1981)
- Ratu Ilmu Hitam (1981)
- Pasukan Berani Mati (1982)
- Lebak Membara (1982)
- Jaka Sembung dan Bajing Ireng (1983)
- Dia Sang Penakluk (1984)
- Residivis (1985)
- Preman (1985)
- Teroris (1986)
- Kelabang Seribu (1986)
- 7 Manusia Harimau (1986)
- Siluman Serigala Putih (1987)
- Saur Sepuh 1 (1987)
- Saur Sepuh 2 (1988)
- Saur Sepuh 3 (1988)
- Soerabaia 45 (1989)
- Saur Sepuh 4 (1991)
- Tukang Bubur Naik Haji: Mahakasih (1996)

==== Soaps ====
- Madu Racun dan Anak Singkong
- Jejak Sang Guru
- Kaca Benggala
- Bang Jagur
- Bintang Film
- Ketika Cinta Bertasbih (2009)
- Ketika Cinta Bertasbih 2 (2009)
- Tukang Bubur Naik Haji The Series (2012)
- Cinta Illahi (2013)
- 7 Manusia Harimau (2014)

== Bibliography ==
- Imam Tantowi (2009). Ketika cinta bertasbih: sebuah skenario megafilm. PT. SinemArt Indonesia bekerjasama dengan Basmala Adikarya Legendaris, Depok. ISBN 978-979-3604-34-3.
