= Zainuddin M. Z. =

Indonesian Islamic preacher and politician

K. H. Zainuddin M.Z.
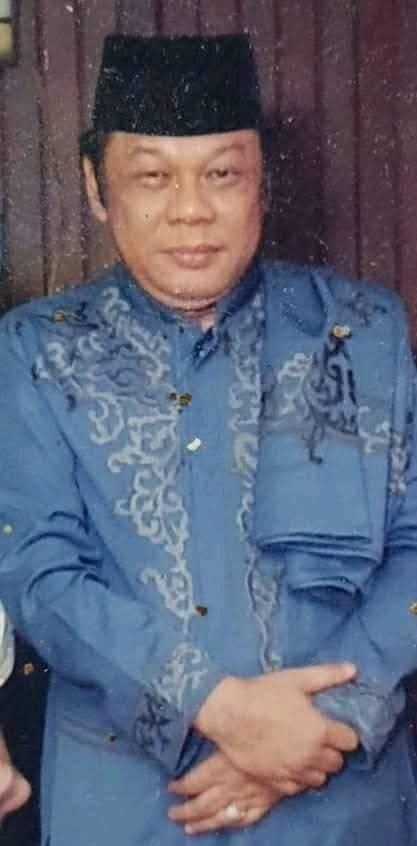
- Zainuddin M. Z. in 1999
- Born: Zainuddin Hamidi; 2 March 1952; Jakarta, Indonesia
- Died: 5 July 2011 (aged 59); Jakarta, Indonesia
- Other name: Zainuddin M.Z.
- Occupations: Islamic preacher da'i politician
- Organization(s): United Development Party; Reform Star Party
- Spouse(s): Siti Khollilah, Rostiati
- Children: M. Fikri Haikal, M. Lutfi, M. Syauqi, M. Zaki Mubarrak, Dian Layalia, Nur Hadi Akmal

Zainuddin Hamidi (2 March 1952 – 5 July 2011), also colloquially known as Zainuddin M.Z., was an Indonesian Islamic preacher, da'i, and politician. He was nicknamed as Dai Sejuta Umat (da'i for millions) due to his sheer popularity among the Indonesian society. He entered politics later in his career, first serving as an administrator of the United Development Party (PPP), and later the chairman of the Reform Star Party (PBR).

== Early life ==
Zainuddin was the only child born in a Betawi family. His family was considered as a part of nahdliyin, a community under the influence of Nahdlatul Ulama. His talent in speech was already visible since his childhood. He went through secondary education at Darul Ma'arif madrasa in Jakarta. During this time, he took the speech course known as Ta'limul Muhadharah (the study of speech). He pursued his higher education at IAIN Syarif Hidayatullah in Jakarta, and postgraduate education at the National University of Malaysia. His hobby was listening to dangdut music.

== Career ==
Lectures by Zainuddin were often attended by tens of thousands of people, leading to him being nicknamed Dai Sejuta Umat (da'i for millions). His wife Kholilah was also increasingly known to the public as his lectures began to be recorded. Cassettes containing his lecture were sold in all of the archipelago and also in some other neighboring Asian countries. He then was frequently featured in TV programs, and also appeared in a collaborative program with pop actors called Nada and Dakwah.

His talent in preaching had led him to the world of politics. During 1977–1982, he was active in the United Development Party (PPP), a political party espousing the Islamic identity. His participation in PPP was heavily influenced by his background as a part of nahdliyin, and the presence of his mentor, Idham Chalid, the former chairman of Nahdlatul Ulama, who was among the founders of PPP. During this time, he was active as an administrator of the party, and concurrently became a member of the advisory board belongs to PPP Jakarta office. PPP valued the presence of Zainuddin and considered him as the key figure for votes. Together with Rhoma Irama, a dangdut popstar, he toured various regions for the campaign and posed a threat to the New Order regime and the dominance of Golkar.

On 20 January 2002, Zainuddin declared the partition from PPP known as Reformation PPP (PPPR) together with his colleagues, which later renamed to the Reform Star Party (PBR) on 8–9 April 2003. He was officially designated as a presidential candidate endorsed by the party during the 2004 presidential election and served as the chairman of the party until 2006. After the departure, he refocused on dawah and televangelism targeting ordinary people.

== Death ==
On 5 July 2011, Zainuddin suffered a seizure after breakfast with his family at his home in Gandaria I, Kebayoran Baru, South Jakarta. He died on his way to the Pertamina Central Hospital, due to heart attack stemming from hyperglycemia.

== Filmography ==
- Nada dan Dakwah (1991)

== Awards and nominations ==
Year	Award	Category	Recipients	Result
1992	Indonesian Film Festival	Citra Award for Best Supporting Actor	Nada dan Dakwah	Nominated

== Television shows ==
- Tabligh Akbar Ramadhan (Indosiar, Ramadan 2000 – 2001)
- Pengantar Sahur dan Berbuka Puasa (Indosiar, Ramadan 1999 – 2002)
- Dakwah Puasa (SCTV, 1991 – 2001)
- Gema Ramadhan (SCTV, 1994 – 2001)
- Damai Indonesiaku (tvOne, 2009 - 2011)
