= Rendra =

Indonesian dramatist, poet, activist, performer, actor and director

W.S. Rendra
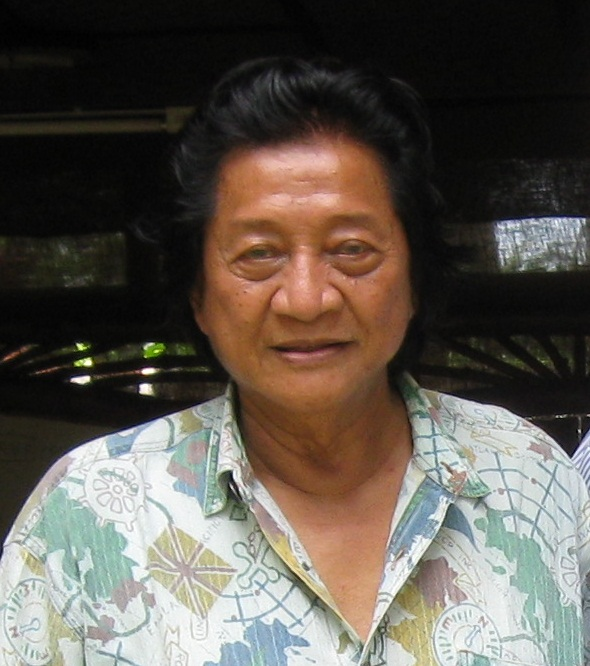
- Born: Willibrordus Surendra Broto Narendra; 7 November 1935 (Netherlands) Surakarta, Dutch East Indies
- Died: 6 August 2009 (aged 73); Depok, Indonesia
- Education: English literature, Gadjah Mada University, American Academy of Dramatic Arts
- Occupations: writer, theatre actor and director
- Spouse(s): Sunarti Suwandi, Raden Ayu Sitoresmi Prabuningrat, Ken Zuraida
- Children: Theodorus Setya Nugraha, Andreas Wahyu Wahyana, Daniel Seta, Samuel Musa, Clara Sinta, Yonas Salya, Sarah Drupadi, Naomi Srikandi, Rachel Saraswati, Isaias Sadewa, Maryam Supraba
- Relatives: Raden Cyprianus Sugeng Brotoatmodjo; Raden Ayu Catharina Ismadillah (parents), Adi Kurdi (brother-in-law)
- Writing career
- Language: Indonesian
- Period: 1952–2009
- Genres: poetry, drama, translation
- Subjects: politics, love, nature, etc
- Notable work: Blues untuk Bonnie
- Notable awards: Art of the Indonesian Government (1970), S.E.A. Write Award (1996), etc
- Literary movement: 50–60s

Willibrordus Surendra Broto Narendra (7 November 1935 – 6 August 2009), widely known as Rendra or W. S. Rendra, was an Indonesian dramatist, poet, activist, performer, actor and director.

== Biography ==
=== Early life ===
Born in Surakarta to a Roman Catholic family and baptized as Willibrordus Surendra Bawana Rendra, he shortened his name to Rendra when he converted to Islam in 1970. After studying English literature and culture at Gajah Mada University in Yogyakarta, he chose not to graduate because he was already gainfully employed with his first theatrical project. He had staged his first play ("Dead Voices") in 1963, became fascinated with the craft, and from then on, with his mixture of traditional religious ritual performances and Western avant-garde experiments, was able to create a large following. Because of the nature of his poetry readings and his flamboyant performances on the stage, the press gave him the nickname "Burung Merak" (the Peacock).

=== Career ===
In the 1960s his theatrical company was instrumental in inaugurating a stream of innovative, modernist, and controversial theatre performances that were based to a large extent on Western models. In 1969 he created a series of dramas without any dialog where actors employed their bodies and simple sounds such as "bip bop", "zzzzz" and "rambate rate rata". The journalist poet Goenawan Mohamad dubbed these experimental performances as "mini-word theatre". During the 1970s, his plays such as "Mastodon", "The Condors", "The Struggle of the Naga Tribe" and "The Regional Secretary" were often banned because they openly criticized Suharto's development programs that tended to side with multinational corporations against the interests of indigenous peoples.

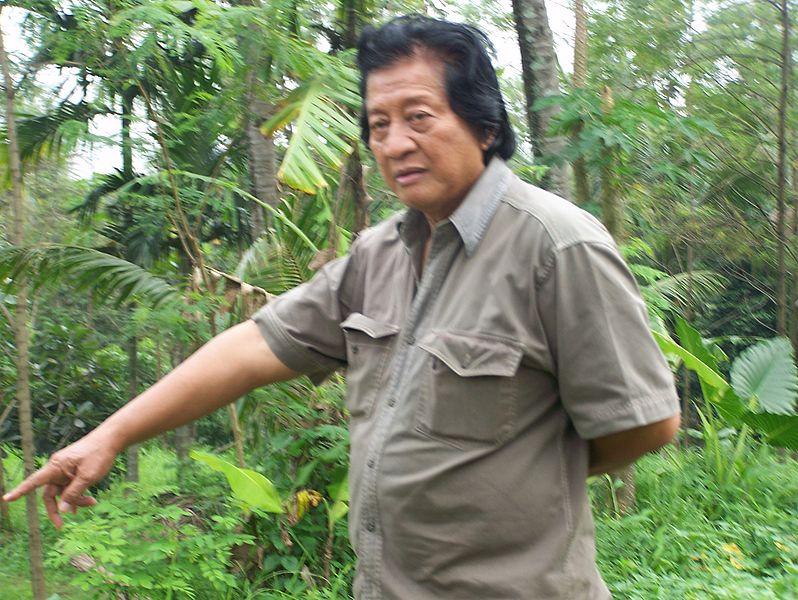
Rendra at the garden of Bengkel Theatre.

Rendra performed Shakespeare, Brecht and, as a devoted student of the Sino-Indonesian kung fu school "Persatuan Gerak Badan Bangau Putih" (White Crane Martial Arts Association), he always looked much younger than his age and played Hamlet when he was well into his sixties. He also translated works of world literature (including Aristophanes, Sophocles and Brecht) into Indonesian for the first time, then performed and staged them. After a period of study at New York City's American Academy of Dramatic Arts he founded the Bengkel Teater in 1967. He brought his Western experience into the traditional Indonesian theater forms to merge them into something new. His productions are an enormous influence on the artistic variety of Indonesian art to this day.

During the repressive New Order era, he was one of the few creative people in his country who had the courage to express dissent. When the novelist Pramoedya Ananta Toer returned from Indonesia's gulag – the prison island of Buru — he said Rendra was "one man who has the courage to resist the power of Suharto, under his own name. If you cannot respect that, you should learn to".

=== Activism ===
During the Suharto era, he lived in a poor district of Jakarta, where artists from all over the world (including Günter Grass) visited. Throughout the 70's he was increasingly recognized as a poet and his performances and poetry readings were well attended events. In 1979, during a poetry reading in the Taman Ismail Marzuki art center in Jakarta, Suharto's military intelligence agents threw ammonia bombs on to the stage and arrested him. He was imprisoned in the notorious Guntur Military Police detention center for nine months, spending time in solitary confinement in a mosquito infested cell with a ceiling too low to stand up. When he was released, without ever having been charged, his body was covered with sores from the mosquito bites.

=== After Suharto's ban ===
After he was released from prison he was banned from performing poetry or drama until 1986, when he wrote, directed and starred in his eight-hour-long play "Panembahan Reso", which discussed the issue of the succession of power, which was a taboo subject at that time. Before the performance at the Senayan Sports Center, he told his cast of actors: "Pack your toiletries, because there is a chance that we might get arrested". The play took six months to prepare and was performed for two nights. "Modern Indonesian theater has no infrastructure. We must create it ourselves", he used to tell his performers. After the fall of the Suharto dictatorship in 1998 and the beginning of democratization, he was a dominant figure in the emerging world of modern Indonesian literature and theater and became the patron of an unrestricted, free and socially engaged artistic community.

== Literary legacy ==
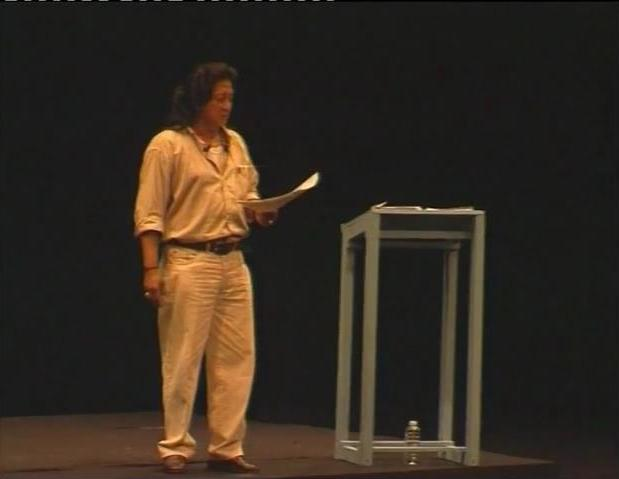
Rendra on stage

He continued to create numerous literary and cultural projects. In 2003, now long recognized internationally as a great poet, he hosted the first international poetry festival in Indonesia (in Makassar, Solo, Bandung and Jakarta). He was on the list of candidates for the Nobel Prize for Literature several times, saw international publications of his texts, and made numerous appearances at literary festivals around the world. Until his death, he worked continuously on books, literature, and various projects and productions, and occasionally as a movie actor.

His last home, in Depok, south of Jakarta, was a farm and until recently was also the home of the Bengkel Teater, where he and his actors and artists lived, worked and also maintained an ecologically sustainable farming operation.

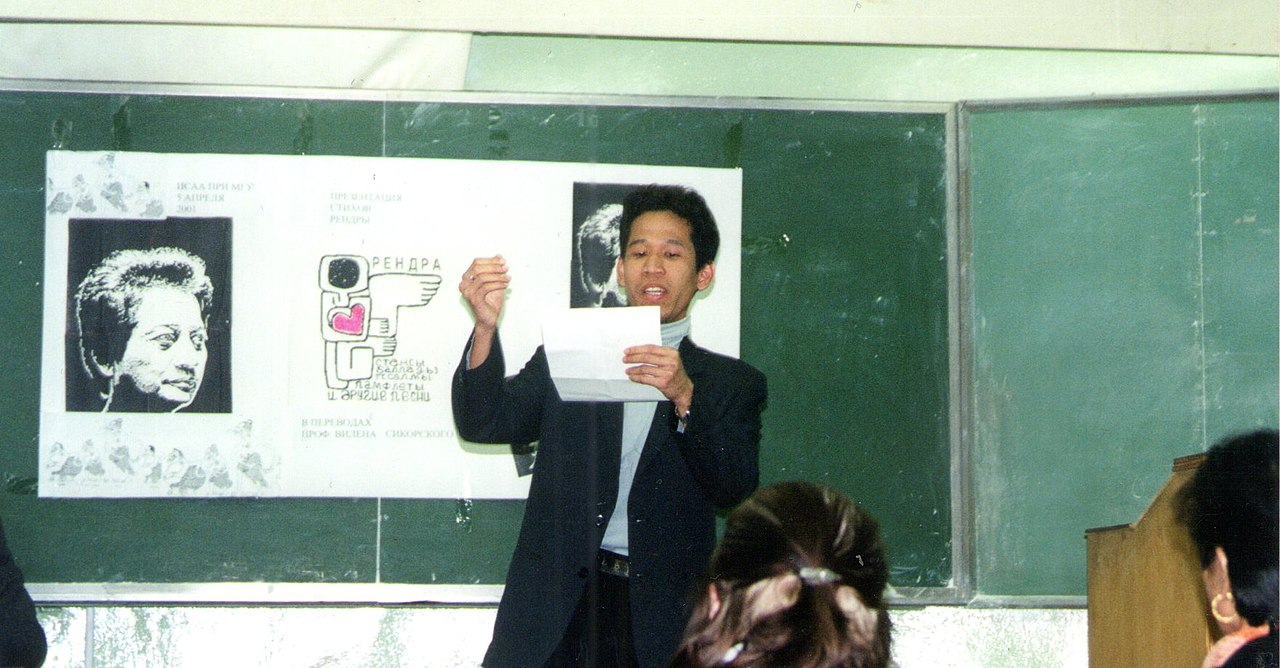
Poetry Reading on the birthday occasion of Indonesian poet Rendra at the Nusantara Society (Moscow) 5.4.2001

== Quotations ==
"I learned meditation and the disciplines of the traditional Javanese poet from my mother who was a palace dancer. The idea of the Javanese poet is to be a guardian of the spirit of the nation".

== Awards ==
- First prize of Sayembara - Writing Arts Drama Section of the Faculty of Education and Culture, University of Gajah Mada Yogyakarta (1954)
- National Literature Prize BMKN (1956)
- Art of the Indonesian Government (1970)
- Prize of the Academy Jakarta (1975)
- Main Book Prize of the Ministry of Education and Culture (1976)
- Adam Malik Award (1989)
- The S.E.A. Write Award (1996)
- Achmad Bakri Award (2006)
