= Asrul Sani =

Indonesian writer

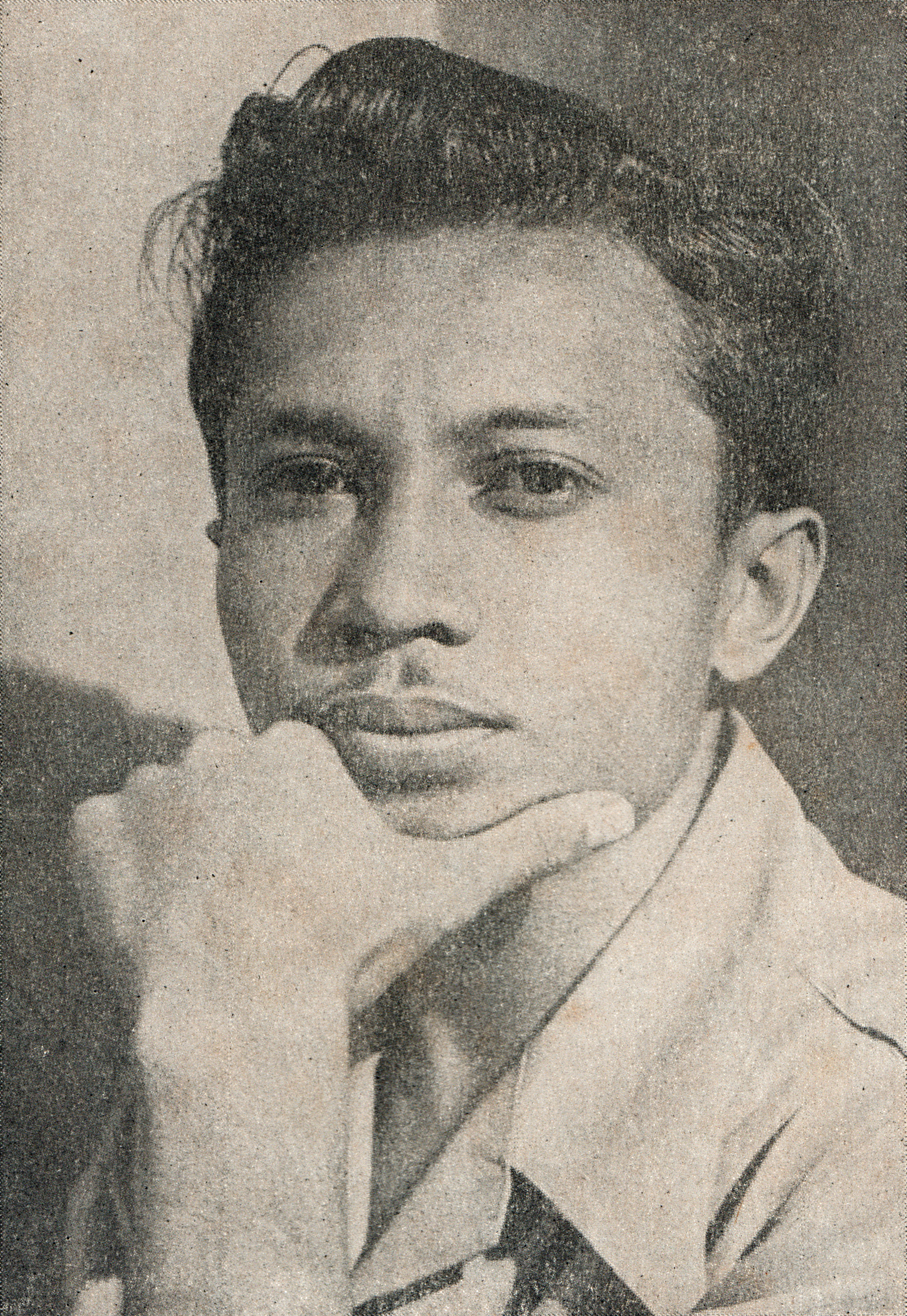
- Sani, c. 1955
- Born: 10 June 1926; Rao, Dutch East Indies
- Died: 11 January 2004 (aged 77); Jakarta, Indonesia

Asrul Sani (10 June 1926 – 11 January 2004) was an Indonesian writer, poet and screenwriter.

== Biography ==
Sani was born in Rao, West Sumatra on 10 June 1926. His father was Sultan Marah Sani Syair Alamsyah.

Together with Chairil Anwar and Rivai Apin, Sani published Tiga Menguak Takdir in 1950. In the 1950s, together with Usmar Ismail, he founded Akademi Teater Nasional Indonesia (Indonesia National Theater Academy).

Sani's first screenplay was Lewat Djam Malam (After the Curfew) which obtained an award in the 1955 Indonesian Film Festival. His other screenplays that obtained Citra awards were Naga Bonar, Kejarlah Daku Kau Kutangkap (Chase Me, I'll Catch You), Titian Serambut Dibelah Tujuh, and Kemelut Hidup (Life Crisis). Apa Jang Kau Tjari, Palupi? (What are You Looking for, Palupi?) received an award in the Asian Film Festival. His screenplay for Al Kautsar (1977) was the first Indonesian film with Islamic themes in over a decade.

He had become a chairman of Dewan Perfilman Nasional (the National Film Board). After that, the situation of Indonesian cinema deteriorated. He then focused on writing screenplays for soap operas, adapted from Indonesian novels, such as Sitti Nurbaya, Salah Asuhan, and Sengsara Membawa Nikmat.

Sani died on 11 January 2004.

== Legacy ==
Kejarlah Daku Kau Kutangkap (1985) won a Citra award in 1986, Piala Anteman and Piala Bing Slamet. Naga Bonar (1986) won a Citra award in 1987.

Sani received an Anugerah Seni award in 1969 and a Bintang Mahaputera medal in 2000 from the government. According to Ajip Rosidi, he could speak English, Dutch, French, and German.

== Bibliography ==
- Imanjaya, Ekky (2006). A to Z about Indonesian Film (in Indonesian). Bandung: DAR! Mizan. ISBN 9789797523671.
- Izharuddin, Alicia (2016). Gender and Islam in Indonesian Cinema. Springer. ISBN 978-981-10-2173-2.
- Rosidi, Ajip (2010). Mengenang Hidup Orang Lain: Sejumlah Obituari (in Indonesian). Jakarta: Kepustakaan Populer Gramedia. ISBN 9789799102225.
- Sani, Asrul. Perspective of Indonesia, An Atlantic Supplement: "The Literary Movement" and "Three Village Sketches from Sumatra" (1956), The Atlantic Monthly, June, 1956.
