= Citra Award for Best Actor =

Award given annually at the Indonesian Film Festival

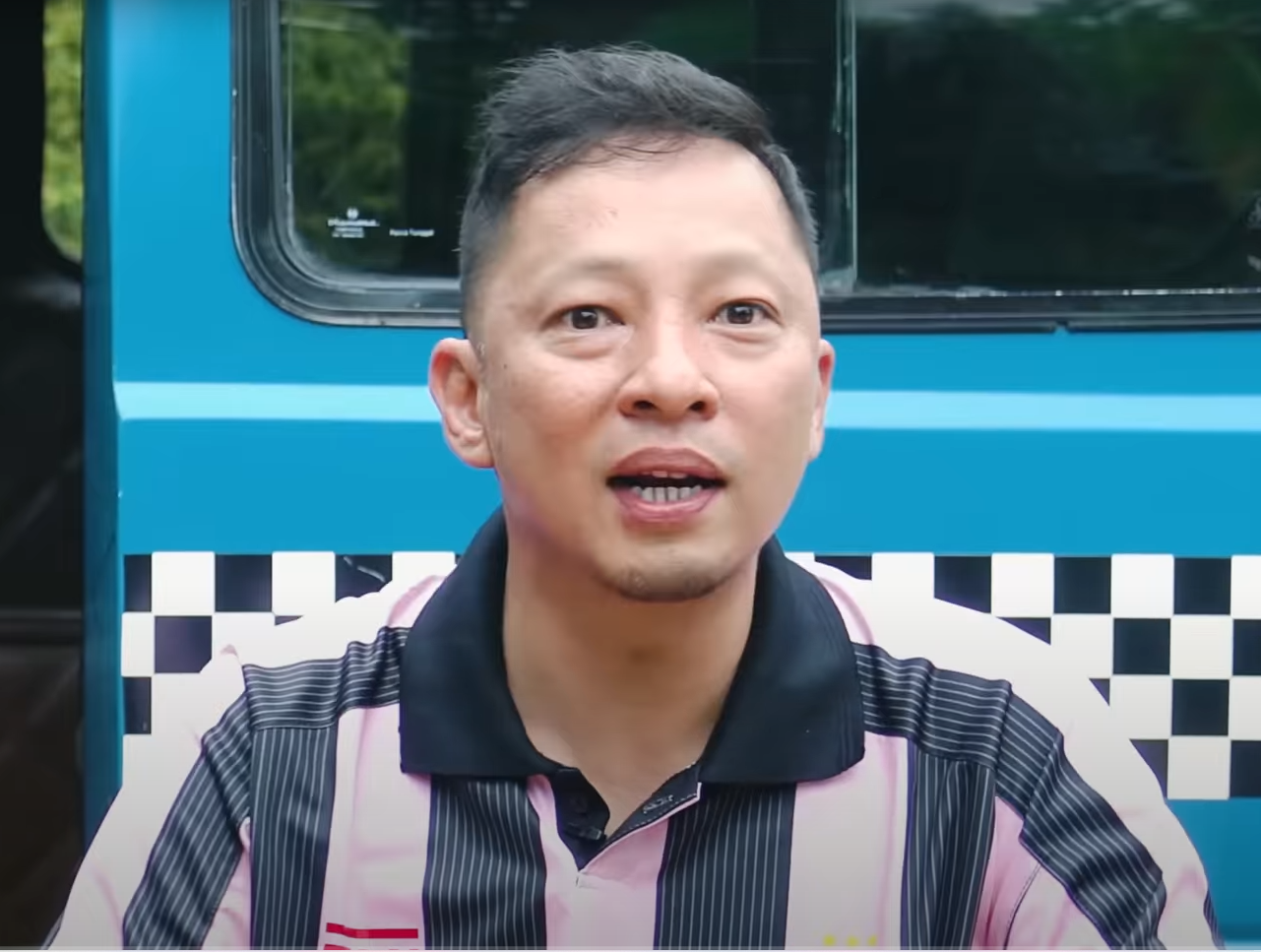
- Current recipient: Ringgo Agus Rahman
- Awarded for: Best actor of the year
- Country: Indonesia
- Presented by: Indonesian Film Festival
- First award: 1955
- Currently held by: Ringgo Agus Rahman, Pawn (2025)

Highlights
- Most wins: Reza Rahadian (4)
- Most nominations: Reza Rahadian (14)
- Website: festivalfilm.id

The Citra Award for Best Actor (Indonesian: Piala Citra untuk Pemeran Utama Pria Terbaik) is an award given at the Indonesian Film Festival (FFI) to Indonesian actors for their achievements in leading roles. The Citra Awards, described by Screen International as "Indonesia's equivalent to the Oscars", are the country's most prestigious film awards and are intended to recognize achievements in films as well as to draw public interest to the film industry.

Ringgo Agus Rahman is the most recent winner for his performances in Falling in Love Like in Movies and Pawn at the 2024 and 2025 ceremonies, respectively. He became the second actor to win the award two years in a row, a distinction previously achieved by Deddy Mizwar in 1986 and 1987.

== History ==
The Citra Awards, then known as the Indonesian Film Festival Awards, were first given in 1955 to two winners without a nomination process: AN Alcaff (Lewat Djam Malam) and A. Hadi (Tarmina). The two-way tie, also found in the Best Film and Best Actress categories, was controversial as film critics considered Lewat Djam Malam the superior film, leading to allegations that Djamaluddin Malik had bought Tarmina's prize. Succeeding festivals were held in 1960 and 1967 and annually since 1973.

There were no Citra Awards given between 1993 and 2003 due to sharp decline in domestic film production. It was reinstated as an annual event in 2004 after receiving funds from the Indonesian government.

Reza Rahadian is the most decorated actor with 4 awards out of 14 nominations, followed by Deddy Mizwar (3 wins out of 11 nominations) and Sukarno M. Noor (3 wins out of 3 nominations). Mizwar also holds the distinction of winning Best Actor for playing the same character twice: for Nagabonar in 1987 and its sequel 20 years later Nagabonar Jadi 2 in 2007. Ray Sahetapy received six nominations between 1984 and 1990 (except 1987), but did not win any. Rahadian also holds the distinction of receiving multiple nominations in the same year a record four-time in 2010, 2015, 2016, and 2020.

Four actors—Mizwar, Rahadian, Nicholas Saputra, and Zainal Abidin—have received multiple nominations in a single year. All four won the award in the year they had double nominations, except for Rahadian's second (in 2015) and third (2020) double nominations, where he lost to Deddy Sutomo and Gunawan Maryanto respectively. Two films—Nagabonar Jadi 2 and Warkop DKI Reborn: Jangkrik Boss! Part 1—earned two lead actors nominations in 2007 and 2016 respectively. Only the former went on to win the award.

At the 1980 ceremony, no Best Actor award was given as the jury panel felt none of the nominated performances that year deserved to win.

== Nominations and awards ==
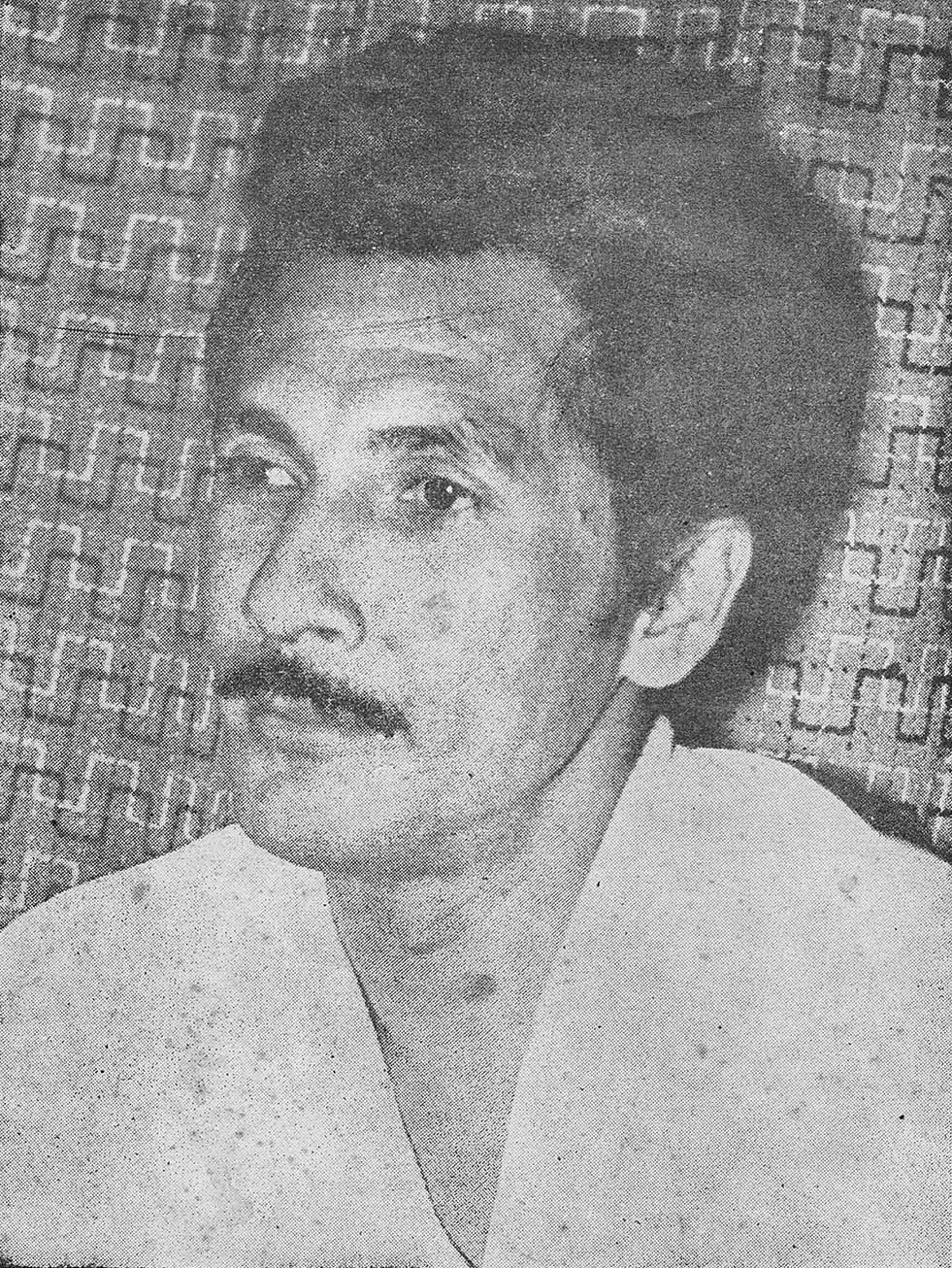
AN Alcaff received one of the inaugural Citra Awards.

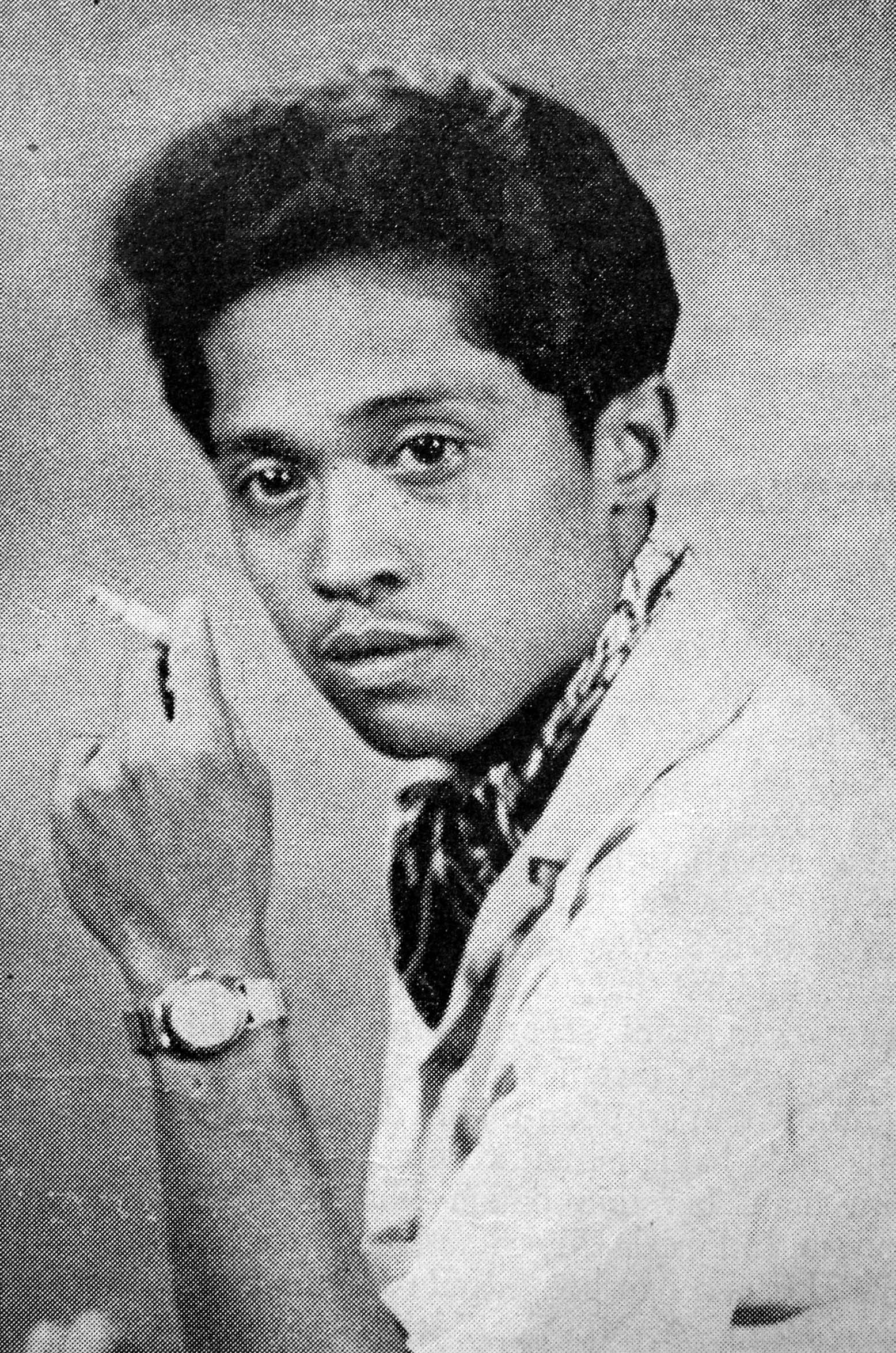
Sukarno M. Noor has received the award three times.

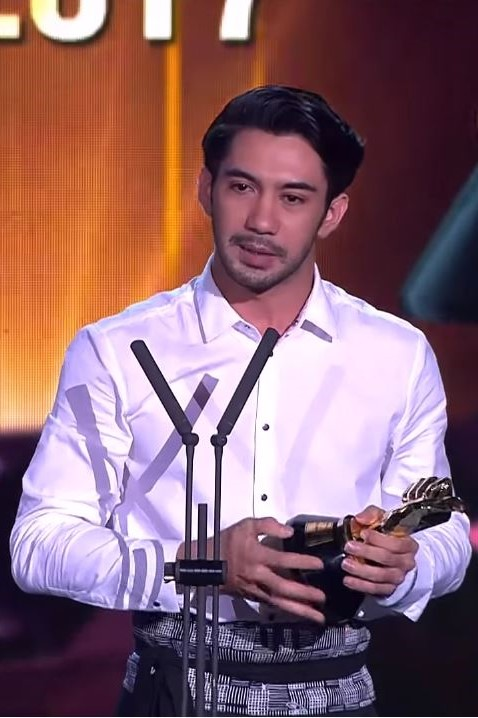
Reza Rahadian has won four awards out of fourteen nominations, the most of any other actors.

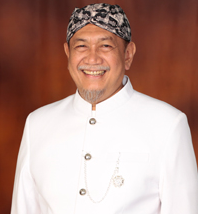
Deddy Mizwar is the only actor to have won twice for the same character in Nagabonar and Nagabonar Jadi 2

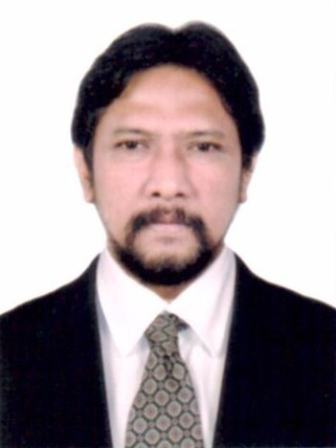
Jamal Mirdad and then-wife Lydia Kandou won Best Actor and Best Actress for Ramadhan dan Ramona.

Winners are highlighted in blue and listed in bold.

=== 1950s ===
Year	Recipient	Film	Ref
**1955** (1st)	**A. Hadi TIE**	**Tarmina**	
**1955** (1st)	**A. N. Alcaff TIE**	**Lewat Djam Malam**	
1956	NOT HELD		
1957	NOT HELD		
1958	NOT HELD		
1959	NOT HELD		

=== 1960s ===
Year	Recipient	Film	Ref
**1960** (2nd)	**Sukarno M. Noor**	**Anakku Sajang**	
1961	NOT HELD		
1962	NOT HELD		
1963	NOT HELD		
1964	NOT HELD		
1965	NOT HELD		
1966	NOT HELD		
**1967** (3rd)	**Sukarno M. Noor (2)**	**Dibalik Tjahaja Gemerlapan**	
1968	NOT HELD		
1969	NOT HELD		

=== 1970s ===
Year	Recipient	Film	Ref
1970	NOT HELD		
1971	NOT HELD		
1972	NOT HELD		
**1973** (4th)	**Benyamin Sueb**	**Intan Berduri**	
**1974** (5th)	**Mang Udel**	**Si Mamad**	(Note: Award given as "Best Actor (with Praise)" (Pemeran Utama Pria Terbaik Dengan Pujian); a similar distinction was made with the Best Actress award. Mang Udel received the Citra.)
**1974** (5th)	Kusno Sudjarwadi	Rio Anakku	(Note: Award given as "Best Actor (with Recognition)" (Pemeran Utama Pria Terbaik Dengan Penghargaan); a similar distinction was made with the Best Actress award. This was, in effect, a "runner up" award.)
**1975** (6th)	**Slamet Rahardjo**	**Ranjang Pengantin**	
**1976** (7th)	**Ratno Timoer**	**Cinta**	
**1977** (8th)	**Benyamin Sueb (2)**	**Si Doel Anak Modern**	
**1978** (9th)	**Kaharuddin Syah**	**Letnan Harahap**	
**1979** (10th)	**Sukarno M. Noor (3)**	**Kemelut Hidup**	
**1979** (10th)	El Manik	Gara-Gara Istri Muda	
**1979** (10th)	Maruli Sitompul	November 1828	
**1979** (10th)	Parto Tegal	Pulau Cinta	

=== 1980s ===
Year	Recipient	Film	Ref
**1980** (11th)	Deddy Hariadi	Si Pincang	No winner (Note: No award was given due to the jury's determination that no actors deserved the award.)
**1980** (11th)	Fachrul Rozi	Harmonikaku	No winner
**1980** (11th)	Ryan Hidayat	Anna Maria	No winner
**1980** (11th)	W. D. Mochtar	Yuyun Pasien Rumah Sakit Jiwa	No winner
**1980** (11th)	Zainal Abidin	Si Pincang	No winner
**1981** (12th)	**Maruli Sitompul**	**Laki-laki dari Nusakambangan**	
**1981** (12th)	Adi Kurdi	Bukan Istri Pilihan	
**1981** (12th)	Dian Hasry	Usia 18	
**1982** (13th)	**Zainal Abidin**	**Putri Seorang Jendral**	
**1982** (13th)	Deddy Mizwar	Bukan Impian Semusim	
**1982** (13th)	Pitrajaya Burnama	Nila di Gaun Putih	
**1982** (13th)	Rachmat Hidayat	Tali Merah Perkawinan	
**1982** (13th)	S. Bagio	Sang Guru	
**1982** (13th)	Zainal Abidin	Mawar Jingga	
**1983** (14th)	**Slamet Rahardjo (2)**	**Di Balik Kelambu**	
**1983** (14th)	El Manik	Titian Serambut Dibelah Tujuh	
**1983** (14th)	Roy Marten	Tapak-Tapak Kaki Wolter Monginsidi	
**1983** (14th)	W. D. Mochtar	Roro Mendut	
**1984** (15th)	**El Manik**	**Budak Nafsu**	
**1984** (15th)	Amoroso Katamsi	Pengkhianatan G30S/PKI	
**1984** (15th)	Deddy Mizwar	Sunan Kalijaga	
**1984** (15th)	Rano Karno	Yang	
**1984** (15th)	Ray Sahetapy	Ponirah Terpidana	
**1985** (16th)	**Alex Komang**	**Doea Tanda Mata**	
**1985** (16th)	Deddy Mizwar	Saat-Saat Kau Berbaring di Dadaku	
**1985** (16th)	Rano Karno	Ranjau-Ranjau Cinta	
**1985** (16th)	Ray Sahetapy	Kerikil-Kerikil Tajam	
**1985** (16th)	Zainal Abidin	Kembang Kertas	
**1986** (17th)	**Deddy Mizwar**	**Arie Hanggara**	
**1986** (17th)	Deddy Mizwar	Kejarlah Daku Kau Kutangkap	
**1986** (17th)	Mathias Muchus	Beri Aku Waktu	
**1986** (17th)	Ray Sahetapy	Opera Jakarta	
**1987** (18th)	**Deddy Mizwar (2)**	**Nagabonar**	
**1987** (18th)	Cok Simbara	Penyesalan Seumur Hidup	
**1987** (18th)	El Manik	Biarkan Bulan Itu	
**1987** (18th)	Rano Karno	Arini (Masih Ada Kereta yang Akan Lewat)	
**1987** (18th)	Slamet Rahardjo	Kodrat	
**1988** (19th)	**Mathias Muchus**	**Istana Kecantikan**	
**1988** (19th)	Deddy Mizwar	Ayahku	
**1988** (19th)	Ray Sahetapy	Tatkala Mimpi Berakhir	
**1988** (19th)	Pitrajaya Burnama	Tjoet Nja' Dhien	
**1989** (20th)	**Rachmat Hidayat‡**	**Pacar Ketinggalan Kereta**	
**1989** (20th)	Eeng Saptahadi	Semua Sayang Kamu	
**1989** (20th)	Mang Udel	Si Badung	
**1989** (20th)	Rano Karno	Arini II (Biarkan Kereta Api Itu Lewat)	
**1989** (20th)	Ray Sahetapy	Noesa Penida (Pelangi Kasih Pandansari)	

=== 1990s ===
Year	Recipient	Film	Ref
**1990** (21st)	**Rano Karno**	**Taksi**	
**1990** (21st)	Deddy Mizwar	2 dari 3 Laki-Laki	
**1990** (21st)	Didi Petet	Joe Turun ke Desa	
**1990** (21st)	Ray Sahetapy	Jangan Bilang Siapa-siapa	
**1990** (21st)	Sophan Sophiaan	Sesaat dalam Pelukan	
**1991** (22nd)	**Tio Pakusadewo**	**Lagu untuk Seruni**	
**1991** (22nd)	Didi Petet	Boneka dari Indiana	
**1991** (22nd)	Mathias Muchus	Cintaku di Way Kambas	
**1991** (22nd)	Rachmat Hidayat	Potret	
**1992** (23rd)	**Jamal Mirdad**	**Ramadhan dan Ramona**	
**1992** (23rd)	Cok Simbara	Plong (Naik Daun)	
**1992** (23rd)	Rano Karno	Kuberikan Segalanya	
**1992** (23rd)	Rhoma Irama	Nada dan Dakwah	
1993	NOT HELD		
1994	NOT HELD		
1995	NOT HELD		
1996	NOT HELD		
1997	NOT HELD		
1998	NOT HELD		
1999	NOT HELD		

=== 2000s ===
Year	Recipient	Film	Ref
2000	NOT HELD		
2001	NOT HELD		
2002	NOT HELD		
2003	NOT HELD		
**2004** (24th)	**Tora Sudiro**	**Arisan!**	
**2004** (24th)	Derby Romero	Petualangan Sherina	
**2004** (24th)	Nicholas Saputra	Ada Apa dengan Cinta?	
**2004** (24th)	Tosan Wiryawan	Marsinah: Cry Justice	
**2004** (24th)	Winky Wiryawan	Mengejar Matahari	
**2005** (25th)	**Nicholas Saputra**	**Gie**	
**2005** (25th)	Bucek Depp	Brownies	
**2005** (25th)	Deddy Mizwar	Ketika	
**2005** (25th)	Mike Muliadro	Detik Terakhir	
**2005** (25th)	Nicholas Saputra	Janji Joni	
**2006** (26th)	**Albert Fakdawer**	**Denias, Senandung di Atas Awan**	
**2006** (26th)	Aries Budiman	Garasi	
**2006** (26th)	Dwi Sasono	Mendadak Dangdut	
**2006** (26th)	Ramon Y. Tungka	Ekskul	
**2006** (26th)	Ringgo Agus Rahman	Jomblo	
**2007** (27th)	**Deddy Mizwar (3)**	**Nagabonar Jadi 2**	
**2007** (27th)	Dwi Sasono	Mengejar Mas-Mas	
**2007** (27th)	Fachri Albar	Kala	
**2007** (27th)	Ringgo Agus Rahman	Get Married	
**2007** (27th)	Tora Sudiro	Nagabonar Jadi 2	
**2008** (28th)	**Vino G. Bastian**	**Radit & Jani**	
**2008** (28th)	Aming Sugandhi	Doa yang Mengancam	
**2008** (28th)	Donny Alamsyah	Fiksi.	
**2008** (28th)	Nicholas Saputra	3 Doa 3 Cinta	
**2008** (28th)	Yama Carlos	May	
**2009** (29th)	**Tio Pakusadewo (2)**	**Identitas**	
**2009** (29th)	Emir Mahira	Garuda di Dadaku	
**2009** (29th)	Reza Rahadian	Emak Ingin Naik Haji	
**2009** (29th)	Vino G. Bastian	Serigala Terakhir	
**2009** (29th)	Yama Carlos	Ruma Maida	

=== 2010s ===
Year	Recipient	Film	Ref
**2010** (30th)	**Reza Rahadian**	**3 Hati Dua Dunia Satu Cinta**	
**2010** (30th)	Edo Borne	I Know What You Did on Facebook	
**2010** (30th)	Oka Antara	Hari Untuk Amanda	
**2010** (30th)	Reza Rahadian	Alangkah Lucunya	
**2010** (30th)	Lukman Sardi	Red Cobex	
**2011** (31st)	**Emir Mahira**	**Rumah Tanpa Jendela**	
**2011** (31st)	Alex Komang	Surat Kecil untuk Tuhan	
**2011** (31st)	Ferdy Taher	Masih Bukan Cinta Biasa	
**2011** (31st)	Oka Antara	Sang Penari	
**2011** (31st)	Tio Pakusadewo	Tebus	
**2012** (32nd)	**Donny Damara**	**Lovely Man**	
**2012** (32nd)	Emir Mahira	Garuda di Dadaku 2	
**2012** (32nd)	Muhammad Syihab	Cita-Citaku Setinggi Tanah	
**2012** (32nd)	Reza Rahadian	Test Pack: You're My Baby	
**2012** (32nd)	Tio Pakusadewo	Rayya, Cahaya Di Atas Cahaya	
**2013** (33rd)	**Reza Rahadian (2)**	**Habibie & Ainun**	
**2013** (33rd)	Abimana Aryasatya	Belenggu	
**2013** (33rd)	Ikranagara	Sang Kiai	
**2013** (33rd)	Joe Taslim	La Tahzan	
**2013** (33rd)	Lukman Sardi	Rectoverso	
**2014** (34th)	**Chicco Jerikho**	**Lights from the East: I Am Maluku**	
**2014** (34th)	Vino G. Bastian	3 Nafas Likas	
**2014** (34th)	Abimana Aryasatya	Haji Backpacker	
**2014** (34th)	Herjunot Ali	Tenggelamnya Kapal van der Wijck	
**2014** (34th)	Ario Bayu	Soekarno	
**2015** (35th)	**Deddy Sutomo**	**Mencari Hilal**	
**2015** (35th)	Reza Rahadian	Kapan Kawin?	
**2015** (35th)	Reza Rahadian	Guru Bangsa: Tjokroaminoto	
**2015** (35th)	Rio Dewanto	Love and Faith	
**2015** (35th)	Vino G. Bastian	Toba Dreams	
**2016** (36th)	**Reza Rahadian (3)**	**My Stupid Boss**	
**2016** (36th)	Reza Rahadian	Rudy Habibie	
**2016** (36th)	Tio Pakusadewo	Surat Dari Praha	
**2016** (36th)	Abimana Aryasatya	Warkop DKI Reborn: Jangkrik Boss! Part 1	
**2016** (36th)	Vino G. Bastian	Warkop DKI Reborn: Jangkrik Boss! Part 1	
**2017** (37th)	**Teuku Rifnu Wikana**	**Night Bus**	
**2017** (37th)	Adipati Dolken	Posesif	
**2017** (37th)	Deddy Sutomo	Kartini	
**2017** (37th)	Ernest Prakasa	Cek Toko Sebelah	
**2018** (38th)	**Gading Marten**	**Love for Sale**	
**2018** (38th)	Adipati Dolken	Teman Tapi Menikah	
**2018** (38th)	Ario Bayu	Sultan Agung: Tahta, Perjuangan dan Cinta	
**2018** (38th)	Iqbaal Ramadhan	Dilan 1990	
**2018** (38th)	Oka Antara	Aruna & Her Palate	
**2018** (38th)	Vino G. Bastian	Chrisye	
**2019** (39th)	**Muhammad Khan**	**Memories of My Body**	
**2019** (39th)	Abimana Aryasatya	Gundala	
**2019** (39th)	Angga Aldi Yunanda	Two Blue Stripes	
**2019** (39th)	Lukman Sardi	27 Steps of May	
**2019** (39th)	Reza Rahadian	My Stupid Boss 2	
**2019** (39th)	Ringgo Agus Rahman	Cemara's Family	

=== 2020s ===
Year	Recipient	Film	Ref
**2020** (40th)	**Gunawan Maryanto**	**The Science of Fictions**	
**2020** (40th)	Alqusyairi Radjamuda	Mountain Song	
**2020** (40th)	Ario Bayu	Impetigore	
**2020** (40th)	Dion Wiyoko	Susi Susanti: Love All	
**2020** (40th)	Ibnu Jamil	Homecoming	
**2020** (40th)	Reza Rahadian	Abracadabra	
**2020** (40th)	Reza Rahadian	Imperfect	
**2021** (41st)	**Chicco Kurniawan**	**Photocopier**	
**2021** (41st)	Deddy Mizwar	A Million of Loves for You	
**2021** (41st)	Iqbaal Ramadhan	Ali & Ratu Ratu Queens	
**2021** (41st)	Jefri Nichol	Jakarta vs Everybody	
**2021** (41st)	Khiva Iskak	Preman: Silent Fury	
**2021** (41st)	Reza Rahadian	Layla Majnun	
**2022** (42nd)	**Marthino Lio**	**Vengeance Is Mine, All Others Pay Cash**	
**2022** (42nd)	Bio One	Srimulat: Hil yang Mustahal	
**2022** (42nd)	Kevin Ardilova	Autobiography	
**2022** (42nd)	Oka Antara	The Red Point of Marriage	
**2022** (42nd)	Vino G. Bastian	Miracle in Cell No. 7	
**2023** (43rd)	**Reza Rahadian (4)**	**Innocent Vengeance**	
**2023** (43rd)	Abimana Aryasatya	The Big 4	
**2023** (43rd)	Angga Yunanda	Andragogy	
**2023** (43rd)	Jose Rizal Manua	The Prize	
**2023** (43rd)	Vino G. Bastian	Buya Hamka Vol. 1	
**2024** (44th)	**Ringgo Agus Rahman**	**Falling in Love Like in Movies**	
**2024** (44th)	Ario Bayu	Samsara	
**2024** (44th)	Arswendy Bening Swara	Badrun & Loundri	
**2024** (44th)	Reza Rahadian	Grave Torture	
**2024** (44th)	Yoga Pratama	Borderless Fog	
**2025** (45th)	**Ringgo Agus Rahman (2)**	**Pawn**	
**2025** (45th)	Arswendy Bening Swara	Tale of the Land	
**2025** (45th)	Dion Wiyoko	Sore: Wife from the Future	
**2025** (45th)	Morgan Oey	The Siege at Thorn High	
**2025** (45th)	Nicholas Saputra	Siapa Dia	

== Multiple wins and nominations ==
Wins	Nominations	Actor
4	14	Reza Rahadian
3	11	Deddy Mizwar
3	3	Sukarno M. Noor
2	5	Tio Pakusadewo, Ringgo Agus Rahman
2	3	Slamet Rahardjo
2	2	Benyamin Sueb
1	8	Vino G. Bastian
1	6	Rano Karno, Nicholas Saputra
1	5	Abimana Aryasatya
1	4	El Manik, Zainal Abidin
1	3	Emir Mahira, Mathias Muchus, Rachmat Hidayat
1	2	Alex Komang, Deddy Sutomo, Mang Udel, Maruli Sitompul, Tora Sudiro
0	6	Ray Sahetapy
0	4	Oka Antara
0	3	Ario Bayu, Lukman Sardi
0	2	Adipati Dolken, Cok Simbara, Didi Petet, Dwi Sasono, Iqbaal Ramadhan, Pitrajaya Burnama, W. D. Mochtar, Yama Carlos

== See also ==
- Cinema of Indonesia
- Indonesian Film Festival
- Citra Award for Best Picture
- Citra Award for Best Director
- Citra Award for Best Actress
- Citra Award for Best Supporting Actor
- Citra Award for Best Supporting Actress
- Maya Awards
