= Triple Cross (1991 film) =

1991 film by Ackyl Anwari

- VHS cover
- Directed by: Ackyl Anwari
- Written by: Christopher Mitchum; Deddy Armand
- Produced by: Gope T. Samtani
- Starring: Cynthia Rothrock; Chris Barnes; Peter O'Brian; Zainal Abidin
- Cinematography: H. Asmawi
- Edited by: Amin Kertaraharja
- Music by: Embie C. Noer (Indonesian version); Larry Wolff (North American version)
- Production company: Rapi Films
- Distributed by: Imperial Entertainment (U.S.)
- Release date: January 12, 1994 (U.S.)
- Running time: 88 minutes (Indonesian version); 76 minutes (North American version)
- Languages: English; Indonesian

Triple Cross (Indonesian: Pertempuran Segitiga, lit. 'Three-Sided Battle') is a 1991 Indonesian martial arts film directed by Ackyl Anwari and starring Cynthia Rothrock, Chris Barnes, Peter O'Brian and Zainal Abidin. Rothrock plays a security expert tasked with convoying a briefcase that contains a computer capable of detecting uranium, and which she alone can open.

When Imperial Entertainment brought the film to the U.S. in 1994, they renamed it Angel of Fury. This had led to some confusion, as Angel of Fury was the original English title for another Rothrock movie made by the same Indonesian company, which Imperial ended up renaming Lady Dragon 2.

== Cast ==
- Cynthia Rothrock as Nancy Bolan (credited as Cindy Rothrock)
- Chris Barnes as Mark Garrison
- Peter O'Brian as Nick Stewart
- Zainal Abidin as David Randolph
- August Melasz as Tony
- Minati Atmanegara as Linda
- Jureck Klyne as Leo
- Roy Marten as Captain Jack
- Kiki Amir as Sarah
- Jack Maland as Chin
- Tanaka as Edward
- Robby Sutara as "Eye Lid"
- Karen Sukarno as Joe
- Hamid Sopeng as Tay
- Eddy Hansudi as Richard
- Rita as Richard's Daughter

== Production ==
=== Development ===
Triple Cross was penned by American actor Christopher Mitchum, who had started writing for Indonesian company Rapi Films after starring in several of their movies. Rothrock had American actor Chris Barnes, a fellow Scrantonian to whom she was engaged at the time, hired as her co-star, and the two bookended their trip with a short holiday in Bali. The production permit obtained from the Indonesian Department of Manpower spanned from October 17 to December 16, 1990. However, Rothrock had prior commitments and flew back to the U.S. on November 5. Actual filming took five weeks.

Mitchum complained that when they did not understand something, the Indonesians would simply throw away pages of his screenplay and insert a fight scene. As a result, even he struggled to understand the finished product. The film was shot without sound and dubbed over in post-production. Rothrock was given the opportunity to provide her own voice, but nobody had kept track of her lines, and she was asked to recreate them from memory, which proved uncomfortable.

== Release ==
The film was distributed in several territories under its original export title. In the U.K., Imperial Entertainment released Triple Cross on VHS on January 24, 1992. The U.K. version is listed at 81 minutes, which includes undisclosed cuts from the BBFC. In Australia, distributor 1st Call Video Rights was granted a release certificate for Triple Cross on January 7, 1992, with the picture clocking in at a similar 82 minutes. That version omits a torture scene at the beginning.

In the U.S., the film was released by Imperial Entertainment, albeit some two years later on January 12, 1994. It was given a new soundtrack and re-edited for the occasion. This cuts reinstates the early torture scene, but misses other bits such as a rooftop chase. Rothrock was still embarrassed by it and tried to dissuade the distributor from releasing it. Imperial took the original export title of Rapi and Rothrock's newest film Angel of Fury—whose rights they had also acquired—and slapped it onto this one, while they rebranded the real Angel of Fury as Lady Dragon 2. The Canadian tape, also re-titled Angel of Fury, was the exact same as in the U.S., imported concurrently by C/FP Video.

== Reception ==
Triple Cross has been poorly received by critics. Ballantine Books' Video Movie Guide dismissed the film as "[b]ottom-end martial arts trash", and said about Rothrock that "[i]f she could act ten times as well as she kicks... she’d still be terrible." The Encyclopedia of Martial Arts Movies found that "[e]ven Cynthia couldn’t disarm this bomb, though she does do a lot of fighting. The martial arts are rather tame and uninspired." Mick Ferris of the U.K.'s Cambridge Town Crier called it "a very poor example" of the martial arts genre, featuring "speeded up fight sequences which resemble a Charlie Chaplin chase", tied together by a story that is "hardly worth elucidating", while Rothrock was deemed to have "considerably less acting ability than some of the planks of wood she delights in putting her foot through." VideoHound's Golden Movie Retriever was more forgiving, acknowledging "[l]ots of martial arts action with the competent Rothrock."
