= Tandjung Katung =

1957 musical drama film by Jacob Harahap

- Directed by: Jacob Harahap
- Screenplay by: Jacob Harahap
- Produced by: Amir Jusuf
- Starring: Rd. Ismail; Fifi Young; Zainal Abidin; Nun Zairina
- Production company: Radial Film
- Release date: 1957
- Country: Indonesia
- Language: Indonesian

Tandjung Katung is a 1957 Indonesian musical drama film directed and written by Jacob Harahap, and produced by Amir Jusuf. It starred Rd. Ismail, Fifi Young, Zainal Abidin, and Nun Zairina.

== Plot ==
Disappointed with her marriage, Sahara left Medan and went to Jakarta. She also forgot her profession as a ronggeng dancer. There, she met Effendi who invited her to create a national social dance using sources from regional dances.

== Cast ==
- Rd. Ismail
- Fifi Young
- Zainal Abidin
- Nun Zairina
- Kamsul
- Hardjo Muljo
- Masito Sitorus
- Hadisjam Tahax

== Production ==
Tandjung Katung was produced by Amir Jusuf for Radial Film, who also produced Serampang 12, and was directed and written by Jacob Harahap. It starred Rd. Ismail, Fifi Young, Zainal Abidin, and Nun Zairina (possibly as Sahara) in a leading role. It featured Kamsul, Hardjo Muljo, Masito Sitorus, and Hadisjam Tahax. The film was shot in Medan and Jakarta. It featured 10 songs and 15 new dance creations.

== Release ==
Tandjung Katung was released in 1957. The premiere in North Sumatra was attended by President Sukarno. Dancing accompanied the screening.

== Citations ==
=== Works cited ===
- Kristanto, J. B. (2005). Katalog film Indonesia, 1926-2005 (in Indonesian). Nalar bekerjasama dengan Fakultas Film dan Televisi, Institut Kesenian Jakarta, [dan] Sinematek Indonesia. ISBN 978-979-99395-3-1.
- California, University of (February 1957). Madjalah Angkatan Darat (in Indonesian).
