= Nagabonar Jadi 2 =

- Directed by: Deddy Mizwar
- Written by: Musfar Yasin
- Produced by: Tyas Abiyoga
- Starring: Deddy Mizwar; Tora Sudiro; Wulan Guritno; Lukman Sardi; Uli Herdinansyah; Darius Sinathrya; Michael Muliadro
- Cinematography: Yudi Datau
- Edited by: Tito Kurnianto
- Music by: Thoersi Argeswara
- Distributed by: Citra Sinema
- Release date: March 29, 2007
- Running time: 157 minutes
- Country: Indonesia
- Language: Indonesian
- Box office: Rp31 billion ($US2.2 million)

Naga Bonar Jadi 2 (Naga Bonar is Two) is 2007 comedy film directed by Deddy Mizwar. It is starring Deddy Mizwar, Tora Sudiro, Lukman Sardi, Darius Sinathrya and Michael Muliardo. It is a sequel to the Indonesian film Nagabonar (1987).

== Synopsis ==
Nagabonar Jadi 2 is a comedy movie starring Deddy Mizwar and Tora Sudiro as father and son. This movie is a sequel to 1986 hit movie Nagabonar. The story revolves around the relationship between the now old Nagabonar, a pickpocket who became a self-proclaimed general during Indonesia's War of Independence, and his only son Bonaga. The movie touches on various subjects concerning the different views of the older generation and the younger, post-modern generation of Indonesia. These subjects include patriotism, traditional values, and love.

The story begins when old Nagabonar comes to Jakarta from Medan at the request of his son, a successful young businessman who runs a large company with three of his closest friends, Pomo (Darius Sinathrya), Ronnie (Uli Herdinansyah) and Jaki (Michael Muliadro). Conflict and hilarity ensues when Bonaga tells his father the plan to sell their old palm plantation, where his mother and grandmother are buried along with his father's best friend Bujang. Nagabonar's outrage at what he thinks of as a desecration is then quickly subdued by Bonaga's consultant and love interest, Monita (Wulan Guritno), At least until Nagabonar learns that the would-be buyers of his land are Japanese, people who come from the very same country he fought against during the war of independence.

== Cast ==
- Deddy Mizwar as Nagabonar
- Tora Sudiro as Bonaga
- Wulan Guritno as Monita
- Michael Muliadro as Jaki
- Uli Herdinansyah as Ronny
- Darius Sinathrya as Pomo
- Lukman Sardi as Umar

== Awards and nominations ==
The film won five Citra Awards at the 2007 Citra Awards for Best Film, Best Screenplay (Musfar Yasin), Best Leading Actor (Deddy Mizwar), Best Supporting Actor (Lukman Sardi), and Best Sound Editing (Adityawan Susanto and Adimolana Machmud).
