= Peter O'Brian (actor) =

New Zealand actor

- Born: Peter John Wilson; New Zealand
- Occupation: Film actor in Indonesia

Peter O'Brian (born Peter John Wilson) is a New Zealand–Indonesian actor, best known for playing Alex Tarambuan in the movie The Intruder.

== Filmography ==
- The Stabilizer (1986) [Segi Tiga Emas]
- The Intruder (1986) [Pembalasan Rambu]
- Forceful Impact (1987) [Jaringan Terlarang 1]
- Jungle Heat (1988) [Rimba Panas]
- Double Crosser (1989) [Membakar Lingkaran Api]
- Lethal Hunter aka American Hunter (1990) [Pemburu Berdarah Dingin]
- Triple Cross aka Angel of Fury (1990) [Pertempuran Segi Tiga]
- Time Game (1998) [Sanu Samtani (Rapi Film)]
- Operation: RAMBU! (Documentary) (2019)
