= Nun Zairina =

Indonesian dancer, actress, dance instructor, and model (1932–2017)

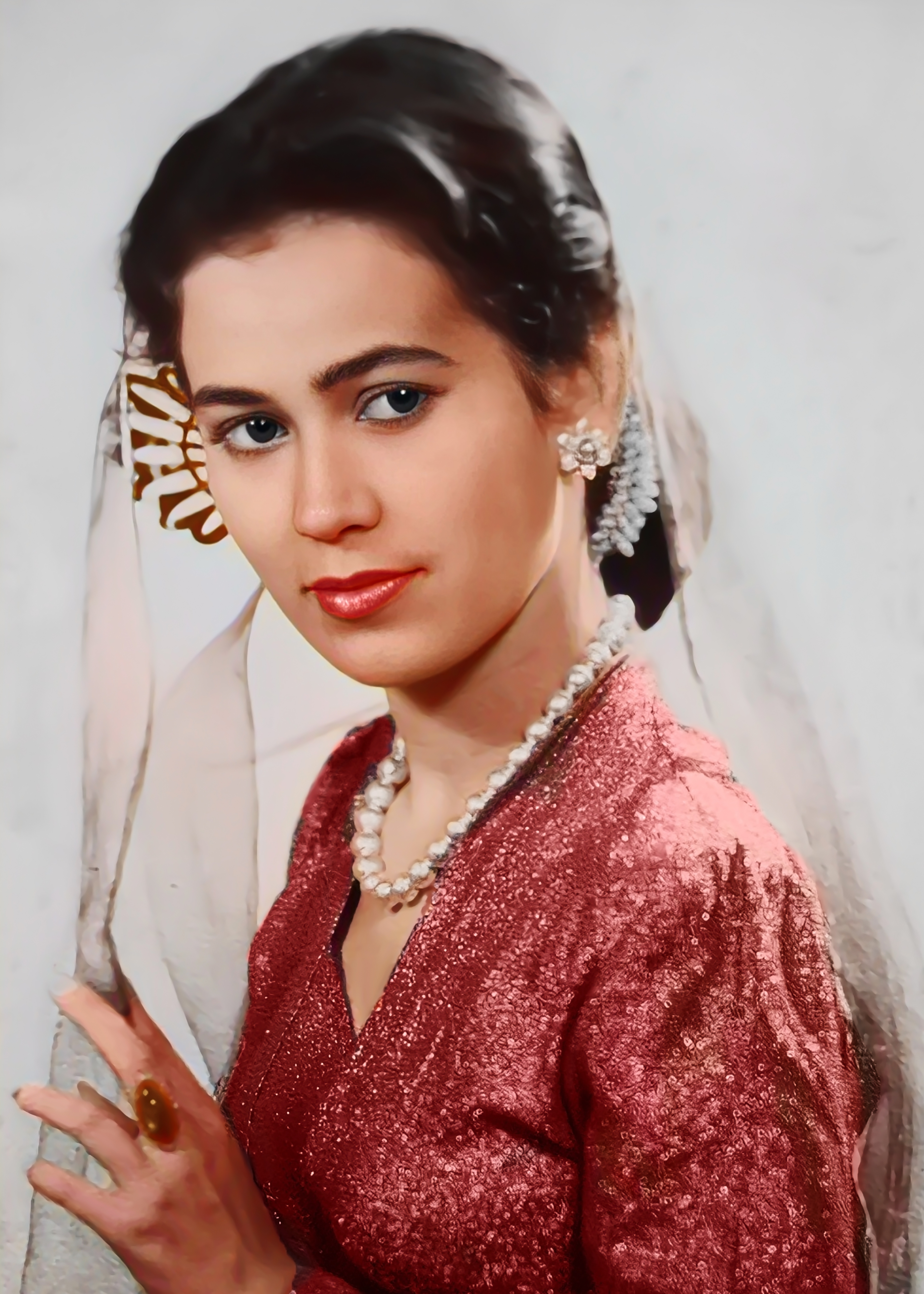
- Zairina in 1958
- Born: Zainun; 1932; Medan, North Sumatra, Dutch East Indies
- Died: 27 December 2017 (aged 84–85); Yogyakarta, Special Region of Yogyakarta, Indonesia
- Burial place: Santren Cemetery
- Occupations: Dancer; actress; dance instructor; model
- Years active: 1953–1958
- Children: 4

Nun Zairina Sarono (born Zainun; 1932 – 27 December 2017) was an Indonesian dancer, actress, dance instructor and model. She was active in the 1950s and 1960s. Zairina is known for her role as Diana in Serampang 12 (1956) and as Sita in Asrama Dara (1958). She taught dance to Indonesia first lady Fatmawati.

== Early life ==
Zairina was born Zainun on 1932 in Medan, North Sumatra. She was of Scottish and Malay descent.

== Personal life ==
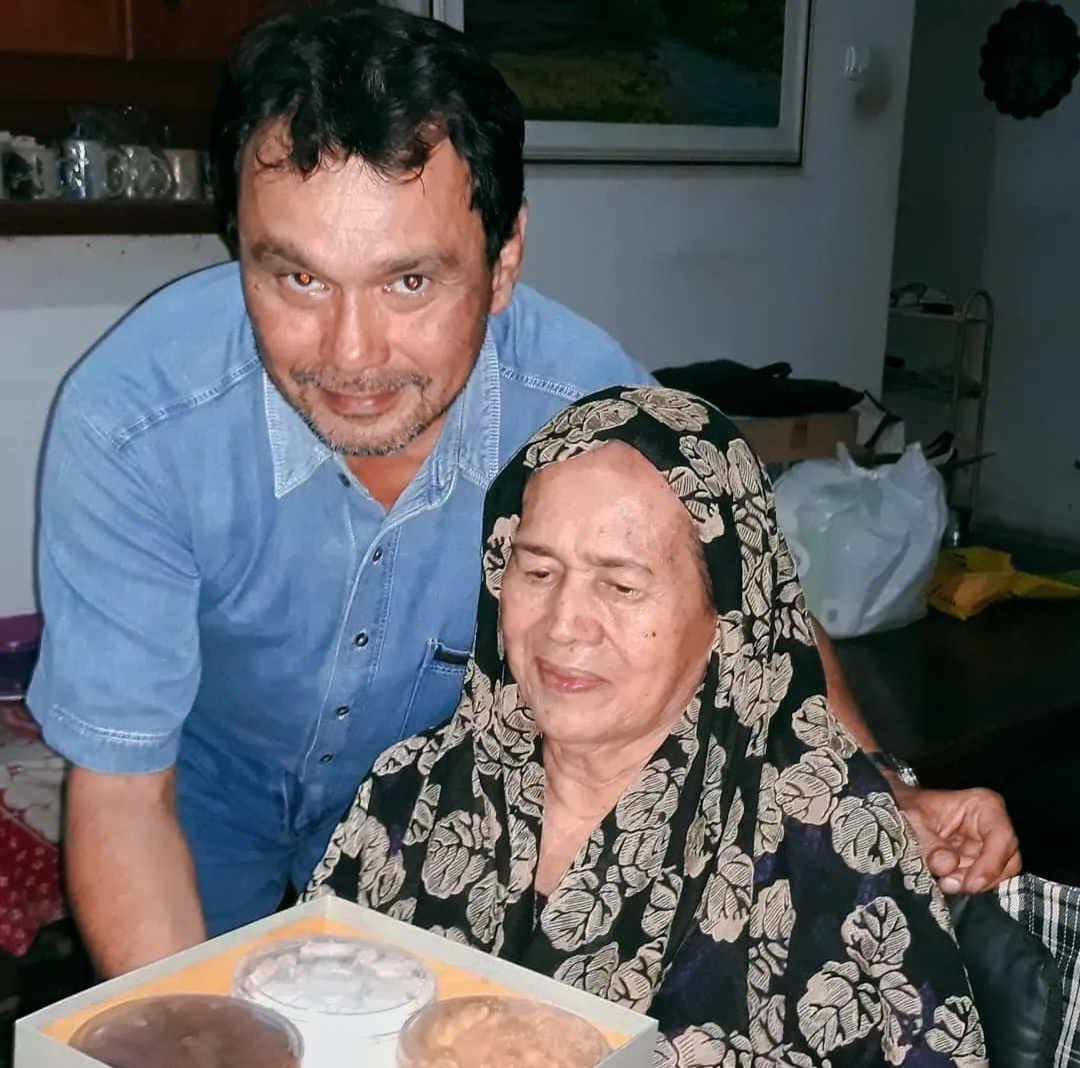
Zairina with her son, Rico Wibisono, in 2017

Zairina was a close friend of Indonesian first lady Fatmawati and her son Guruh Sukarnoputra. She taught dance instructor at her house.

Zairina had three sons, Rino Wicaksono (born 1961), Rico Wibisono (born 1962), and Rito Wibawono (born 1965), and a daughter, Rina Widiantie (born 1968).

=== Death ===
Zairina died in Yogyakarta, Special Region of Yogyakarta, on 27 December 2017 at age 85. She was buried at Santren Cemetery on 28 December.

== Career ==
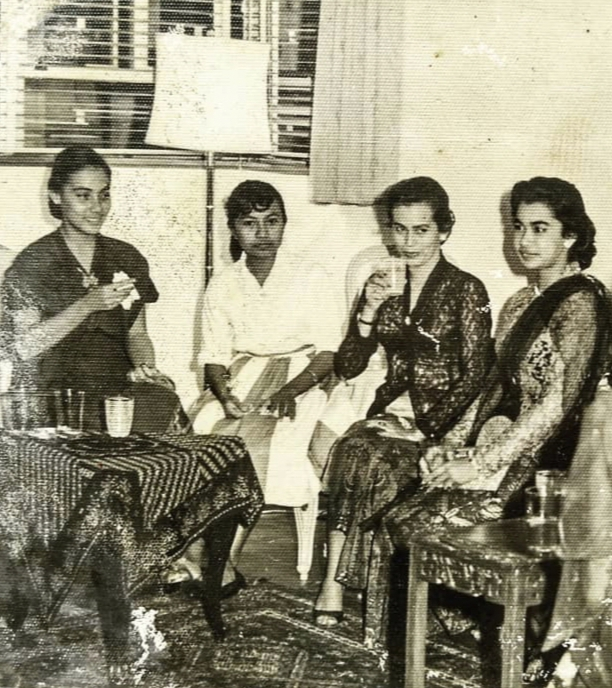
Zairina along with Indriati Iskak and Baby Huwae at the Hongkong Film Festival in 1960

Zairina started her acting career in Bila Tiba Masanya, a broadway production in Medan, in 1953. In 1955, she was cast by Pestin Studio to starred in Kuala Deli (1955), a Malay film produced by Indonesian artist Bakaruddin. Zairina was the only woman from 60 applicants and the only Medan person to star. She later starred in Serampang 12 (1956), a musical film by Radial Film Medan. Zairina received positive reviews for her performance. She later moved to Jakarta.

Zairina starred in her third film, Tandjung Katung (1957). She made her last film appearance starring in Asrama Dara (1958), a film produced by Perfini, and portrayed Sita, a dancer and teacher. Zairina also worked as a dance teacher. She promoted and attracted international attention to the study of Indonesian arts, especially in the field of dance. She became a dance instructor for Indonesian first lady Fatmawati after performing in Merdeka Palace and often practiced at Fatmawati's residence at Sriwijaya Street. In 1958, Zairina attended a film convention festival held by the Communist Party of Indonesia along with artists such as Gordon Tobing and Bing Slamet.

== Stage ==
Broadway stage
Date	Production	Role	Notes	Ref.
1953	Bila Tiba Masanya			

== Filmography ==
Year	Film	Role	Notes
1955	Kuala Deli		
1956	Serampang 12	Diana	
1957	Tandjung Katung		
1958	Asrama Dara	Sita	

== Citations ==
=== Works cited ===
- Aceh, Abubakar (1957). Sedjarah hidup K.H.A. Wahid Hasjim dan karangan tersiar (in Indonesian). Panitya Buku Peringatan Alm. K.H.A. Wahid Hasjim.
- California, University of (1958). Review of Indonesia. Secretariat of the Central Committee of the Communist Party of Indonesia.
- H, Muhammad T. W. (1992). Sejarah teater dan film di Sumatera Utara (in Indonesian). Yayasan "Pelestarian Fakta Perjuangan Kemerdekaan R.I.". Archived from the original on 15 March 2024.
- Adra'i, Kadjat (2008). Suka duka Fatmawati Sukarno (in Indonesian). Yayasan Bung Karno. ISBN 978-979-96573-4-3.
