= Deddy Mizwar =

Indonesian actor, director and politician

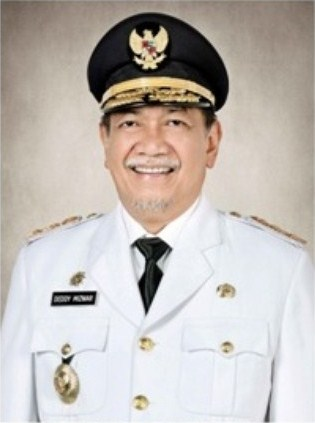
- H. Deddy Mizwar as Deputy Governor of West Java for the 2013 - 2018 term

Vice Governor of West Java
- In office 13 June 2013 – 13 June 2018
- President: Susilo Bambang Yudhoyono; Joko Widodo
- Governor: Ahmad Heryawan
- Preceded by: Dede Yusuf
- Succeeded by: Uu Ruzhanul Ulum

Personal details
- Born: March 5, 1955 (age 71) Jakarta, Indonesia
- Party: Gelora (2019 - present)
- Other political affiliations: Demokrat (2017 - 2019)
- Spouse: R. Giselawati Wiranegara (m. 1986)
- Children: Senandung Nacita; Zulfikar Rakita Dewa
- Parent(s): Adrian Andres (father); Sun'ah (mother)
- Occupation: Celebrity, Director, Politician

Deddy Mizwar (born 5 March 1955) is an Indonesian actor, director, and politician born of an Indo (Dutch-Betawi) father and Betawi-Bugis mother. He is the Chairman of Indonesia's National Film Advisory Board (Badan Pertimbangan Perfilman Nasional) and former Vice Governor of West Java. He also ran for governorship of the province in the 2018 election. His 2010 film How Funny (This Country Is) was selected as the Indonesian entry for the Best Foreign Language Film at the 83rd Academy Awards, but it didn't make the final shortlist.

== Political career ==
On March 28, 2009, Deddy Mizwar was selected as a candidate for President of Indonesia. 13 parties signed the declaration of "Koalisi Merak" (Mengutamakan Rakyat) and chose Deddy Mizwar and Mej Jen (B) Saurip Kadi as their presidential and vice presidential candidates in the 8 July 2009 presidential election. 171 million Indonesians will vote in the April 9, 2009 general election (Pemilu 2009) to elect 560 representatives to the House of Representatives (DPR) or Parlimen.

The 13 parties are Parti Pengusaha dan Pekerja Indonesia (PPPI), Parti Peduli Rakyat Nasional (PPRN), Parti Kedaulatan, Parti Pemuda Indonesia (PPI), Parti Nasional Indonesia Marhaen (PNI Marhaen), Parti Penegak Demokrasi Indonesia (PPDI), Parti Pelopor, Parti Damai Sejahtera (PDS), Parti Bintang Reformasi (PBR), Parti Indonesia Sejahtera (PIS), Parti Merdeka, Parti Persatuan Nahdlatul Ummah Indonesia (PPNUI) and Parti Buruh.

== Family ==
Deddy Mizwar is the son of H. Adrian Andres, who is of Dutch-Bugis descent, and his mother, Mrs Sun'ah. She was heavily involved in Betawi theatre arts at the Jakarta Youth Theatre. Following in his mother's footsteps, Deddy Mizwar has been involved in theatre arts since 1973 and film since 1976. Recently, he and his wife Giselawati have devoted themselves to Islamic da'wah films. The couple established the company PT Demi Gisela Citra Sinema in 1996, focusing on Islamic-genre dramas at a time when television had not yet embraced the concept. These dramas should not be limited to the month of Ramadan.

== Selected filmography ==
1. Naga Naga Naga (2021)
2. Bidadari Mencari Sayap (2020)
3. Sejuta Sayang Untuknya (2020)
4. Bangun Lagi Dong Lupus (2013)
5. How Funny (This Country Is) (2010)
6. Ketika Cinta Bertasbih (2009)
7. Ketika Cinta Bertasbih II (2009)
8. Nagabonar Jadi 2 (2007) (actor and director)
9. Ketika (2005) (actor and director)
10. Kiamat Sudah Dekat (2003) (actor and director)
11. Gema Kampus 66 (1991) (actor)
12. Jual Tampang (1990) (actor)
13. Irisan-Irisan Hati (1988) (actor)
14. Ayahku (1987) (actor)
15. Bilur-bilur Penyesalan (1987) (actor)
16. Cintaku di Rumah Susun (1987) (actor)
17. Kerikil-Kerikil Tajam (1987) (actor)
18. Nagabonar (1987) (actor)
19. Kejarlah Daku Kau Kutangkap (1986) (actor)
20. Arie Hanggara (1986) (actor)
21. Menumpas Teroris (1986) (actor)
22. Sunan Kalijaga & Syech Siti Jenar (1985) (actor)
23. Hati yang Perawan (1984) (actor)
24. Sunan Kalijaga (1984) (actor)

== Awards and nominations ==
Award	Year	Category	Work	Result
Indonesian Film Festival	1982	Citra Award for Best Leading Actor	Bukan Impian Semusim	Nominated
Indonesian Film Festival	1984	Citra Award for Best Leading Actor	Sunan Kalijaga	Nominated
Indonesian Film Festival	1985	Citra Award for Best Leading Actor	Saat-saat Kau Berbaring Di Dadaku	Nominated
Indonesian Film Festival	1985	Citra Award for Best Supporting Actor	Kerikil-kerikil Tajam	Nominated
Indonesian Film Festival	1986	Citra Award for Best Leading Actor	Arie Hanggara	Won
Indonesian Film Festival	1986	Citra Award for Best Leading Actor	Kejarlah Daku Kau Kutangkap	Nominated
Indonesian Film Festival	1986	Citra Award for Best Supporting Actor	Opera Jakarta	Won
Indonesian Film Festival	1987	Citra Award for Best Leading Actor	Nagabonar	Won
Indonesian Film Festival	1988	Citra Award for Best Leading Actor	Ayahku	Nominated
Indonesian Film Festival	1989	Citra Award for Best Supporting Actor	Putihnya Duka Kelabunya Bahagia	Nominated
Indonesian Film Festival	1990	Citra Award for Best Leading Actor	2 dari 3 Laki-laki	Nominated
Indonesian Film Festival	1990	Citra Award for Best Supporting Actor	Jangan Renggut Cintaku	Nominated
Indonesian Film Festival	1992	Citra Award for Best Supporting Actor	Kuberikan Segalanya	Won
Indonesian Film Festival	2005	Citra Award for Best Leading Actor	Ketika	Nominated
Indonesian Film Festival	2007	Citra Award for Best Leading Actor	Nagabonar Jadi 2	Won
Indonesian Film Festival	2009	Citra Award for Best Supporting Actor	Ketika Cinta Bertasbih 2	Nominated
Indonesian Film Festival	2010	Citra Award for Best Supporting Actor	Cinta 2 Hati	Nominated

== Drama ==
1. Hikayat Pengembara (TV Series on Ramadan)
2. Lorong Waktu seasons 1 - 7 (1999 - 2006, 2025, as H. Husin)
3. Demi Masa
4. Kiamat Sudah Dekat
5. Para Pencari Tuhan seasons 1 - 15 (2007 - 2017, 2019–present) (actor & producer)
