= Nagabonar =

- Directed by: MT Risyaf
- Written by: Asrul Sani
- Starring: Nurul Arifin; Deddy Mizwar; Wawan Wanisar; Roldiah Matulessy; Piet Pagau
- Music by: Frankie Raden
- Release date: 1987
- Running time: 95 minutes
- Country: Indonesia
- Language: Indonesian

Nagabonar is a 1987 Indonesian epic war comedy film directed by M.T. Risyaf. It was Indonesia's submission to the 60th Academy Awards for the Academy Award for Best Foreign Language Film, but was not accepted as a nominee. In 2007, the sequel named Nagabonar Jadi 2 released.

== Synopsis ==
Naga Bonar is a pickpocket. During the withdrawal of the Japanese occupying forces from Indonesia in 1945 he declares himself a general of the Liberation Forces. However, soon a mask becomes his true self, and he becomes a true soldier and patriot.

== See also ==
- List of submissions to the 60th Academy Awards for Best Foreign Language Film
- List of Indonesian submissions for the Academy Award for Best Foreign Language Film
