= Si Mamad =

1973 film by Sjumandjaja

- Directed by: Sjuman Djaya
- Written by: Sjuman Djaya
- Produced by: Sjuman Djaya; Handojo
- Starring: Mang Udel; Rina Hassim; Aedy Moward; Ernie Djohan; Rachmat Hidayat; Sandy Suwardi Hassan; Alam Surawidjaja; The Kids
- Cinematography: Sjamsuddin Jusuf
- Production company: PT Matari Film
- Release date: 1973
- Running time: 110 minutes
- Country: Indonesia
- Language: Indonesian language

Si Mamad is a 1973 Indonesian comedy film directed by Sjuman Djaya. The film won two awards at the Indonesian Film Festival in 1974.

== Awards ==
Award	Year	Category	Recipient	Result
Indonesian Film Festival	1974	Best Feature Film		Won
Indonesian Film Festival	1974	Best Male Actor	Mang Udel	Won
Indonesian Journalists Association's Best Actor/Actress Awards	1974	Actor - Runner Up 2	Mang Udel	Won
Indonesian Journalists Association's Best Actor/Actress Awards	1974	Actress - Runner Up 4	Rina Hassim	Won
