= Istana Kecantikan =

Istana Kecantikan is an Indonesian drama film released in 1988. It was directed by Wahyu Sihombing and written by Asrul Sani and starred by Nurul Arifin, Mathias Muchus, and Joyce Erna.At the 1988 Indonesian Film Festival, it got nominated for six nominations, including Best Film, Best Director for Wahyu Sihombing, and Best Actress for Nurul Arifin. The film won Best Actor for Mathias Muchus.

== Plot ==
Nico grapples with his homosexuality, especially when his parents pressure him to marry. His sister, Tuti, encourages him to marry quickly so their parents can have grandchildren. This leads him to enter a lavender marriage with Siska, primarily to hide her pregnancy out of wedlock with Sumitro, who is also Nico's colleague and the one who encouraged him to marry Siska. Siska eventually discovers Nico's sexual orientation when she witnesses him on a date with Toni, an employee at the "Istana Kecantikan" salon—which gives the movie its title. This discovery leads Siska to rekindle her affair with Sumitro. The climax occurs when Nico discovers Toni's affair with Siska, which drives Nico to attempt to kill Siska. However, he ends up killing Toni instead and is subsequently imprisoned.

== Cast ==
- Tonny Hidayat
- Yayuk Sri Rahayu
- Udin Labu
- Anita S
- Rinintasari
- Darussalam
- Soendjoto Adibroto
- Komalasari
- Kaharuddin Syah
- Robby Sutara
- August Melasz
- Mathias Muchus
- Joice Erna
- Nurul Arifin

== Reception and award ==
The film was produced in 1988 and got six nominations at the Indonesian Film Festival that year. These nominations included Best Film, Best Director for Wahyu Sihombing, Best Actress for Nurul Arifin, Best Original Story for Film, and Best Screenplay for Asrul Sani. Ultimately, Istana Kecantikan secured one award with Mathias Muchus winning the Best Leading Actor. The film is widely regarded as the first Indonesian film to feature homosexuality as part of its plot and the first to coin the word "gay" as a term for a homosexual man in Indonesian cinema. Though, in earlier times, the film Remaja di Lampu Merah did include same-sex attraction between men as part of its plot. Rizal Iwan, Indonesian film critic, criticize the film that it create a negative impression of gay people, especially by its conclusion, where the Film Censorship Board remarked that homosexuality is a deviant act. Eddy D. Iskandar, Indonesian journalist and novelist believed that the film is a mark of shifting of Indonesian view of homosexuality that became more tolerant, though it gave negative portrayal.
