= Taksi (film) =

1990 film by Arifin C. Noer

- Directed by: Arifin C Noer
- Written by: Arifin C Noer
- Produced by: Manu Sukmajaya
- Starring: Meriam Bellina; Rano Karno
- Cinematography: George Kamarullah
- Production company: PT Raviman Film
- Release date: 1990
- Running time: 89 minutes
- Country: Indonesia
- Language: Indonesian language

Taksi is a 1990 Indonesian drama film directed by Arifin C Noer. The film won eight awards at the Indonesian Film Festival in 1990. It was the highest-grossing film of 1990–91 in Indonesia. A sequel, Taksi Juga, was released the next year.

== Accolades ==
Award	Year	Category	Recipient	Result
Indonesian Film Festival	1990	Best Feature Film		Won
Indonesian Film Festival	1990	Best Director	Arifin C Noer	Won
Indonesian Film Festival	1990	Best Screenplay Writer	Arifin C Noer	Won
Indonesian Film Festival	1990	Best Editing	Karsono Hadi	Won
Indonesian Film Festival	1990	Best Lead Actor	Rano Karno	Won
Indonesian Film Festival	1990	Best Lead Actress	Meriam Bellina	Won
Indonesian Film Festival	1990	Background Music	Embie C Noer	Nominated
Indonesian Film Festival	1990	Best Artistic Direction	Satari SK	Nominated
Bandung Film Festival	1991	Honored Film		Won
Bandung Film Festival	1991	Honored Actress	Meriam Bellina	Won
