= Zainal Abidin (actor) =

Indonesian actor

- Abidin, mid-1970s
- Born: 31 August 1928; Batavia, Dutch East Indies
- Died: 7 January 2000 (aged 71)
- Occupation: Actor
- Years active: 1952–1997
- Notable work: Usia 18; Putri Seorang Jendral

Zainal Abidin (31 August 1928 – 7 January 2000) was a Citra Award-winning Indonesian actor who played in more than a hundred and fifty films.

== Biography ==
Abidin was born in Batavia, Dutch East Indies (now Jakarta, Indonesia) on 31 August 1928. He completed his education through senior high school before beginning work at a shipping company based at Tanjung Priok in 1950. He left the position in 1952, and the following year made his feature film debut, taking a minor role in Chaidar Djafar's Sedarah Sedaging.

In his first two years as an actor, Abidin took a further ten roles. He remained highly active until 1964. when he was arrested for his relationship with the Communist Party of Indonesia (Partai Komunis Indonesia or PKI) following a failed coup attempt on 30 September 1965 which the army blamed on the PKI. Abidin only made his return to film in 1971, with Lie Soen Bok's Derita Ibu. By the 1980s he reached his peak period of productivity. In 1980 he set a record for acting in 16 films in a single year, and in several years he acted in six or more films.

In 1994 Abidin completed his final feature film, Maman Firmansjah's Setetes Noda Manis. Afterwards, with the domestic film industry on a downturn, he migrated to televised soap operas, acting in several between 1994 and 1997. This included his only directorial effort, the series Maunya Macam-Macam (1996). Abidin died on 7 January 2000, having acted in over 150 feature films.

Abidin was nominated for seven Citra Awards from the Indonesian Film Festival, including four for Best Leading Actor and three for Best Supporting Actor. He received the award twice, first in 1981 for his supporting role in Teguh Karya's Usia 18 and then in 1982 for his leading role in Wim Umboh's Putri Seorang Jendral. He was later styled one of the fathers of Indonesian film.
