= 2025 Indonesian Film Festival =

Indonesian film award ceremony

45th Indonesian Film Festival
- Official poster
- Awarded for: The achievement in Indonesian cinema
- Presented by: Ministry of Culture
- Announced on: Nominations: 19 October 2025
- Presented on: 20 November 2025
- Site: Teater Jakarta, Ismail Marzuki Park, Central Jakarta
- Hosted by: Ringgo Agus Rahman; Sheila Dara Aisha
- Official website: festivalfilm.id

Highlights
- Best Picture: On Your Lap
- Most awards: The Siege at Thorn High (5)
- Most nominations: The Shadow Strays and The Siege at Thorn High (12)

Television coverage
- Network: TVRI

The 45th Indonesian Film Festival ceremony, presented by Ministry of Culture, honored the achievements in Indonesian cinema released from 1 September 2024 to 31 August 2025. The ceremony was held on 20 November 2025 at the Teater Jakarta, Ismail Marzuki Park, Central Jakarta. It was hosted by actors Ringgo Agus Rahman and Sheila Dara Aisha, and televised by TVRI.

Drama film On Your Lap won the Citra Award for Best Picture, alongside three other awards. Action thriller film The Siege at Thorn High won the most awards with five. Other winners included Sore: A Wife from the Future with four, Home Sweet Loan with two, Call Me Dad, Jumbo, Sammi, Who Can Detach His Body Parts, The Shadow Strays, Sie, So I Pray, Tambang Emas Ra Ritek with one each. Romantic musical film Rangga & Cinta won all three audience awards.

The Lifetime Achievement Awards were presented to actor El Manik, composer Franki Raden, and producer Hendrick Gozali. The Antemas Award, a special prize given to the film with the highest number of admissions during its theatrical run, was presented to animated film Jumbo, which garnered 10,233,002 admissions and became the highest-grossing Indonesian film of all-time.

== Juries ==
=== Main Competition ===
- Allan Sebastian – Artistic Director
- Cesa David Luckmansyah – Editor
- Dewi Umaya – Producer
- Nungki Kusumastuti – Actress and Cultural Figure
- Nurman Hakim – Academician and Director
- Salman Aristo – Director and Screenwriter
- Titi Radjo Padmadja – Music Director and Actress
- Whani Darmawan – Actor
- Yunus Pasolang – Cinematographer

=== Short Films Competition ===
- Bayu Prihantoro – Director and Cinematographer
- Melanie Budianta – Academician
- Pritagita Arianegara – Director

=== Documentary Films Competition ===
- Amelia Hapsari – Director
- Lola Amaria – Actor, Producer and Director
- Risa Permanadeli – Academician

=== Animated Films Competition ===
- Faza Ibnu Ubaydillah Salman (Faza Meonk) – Comic Artist, Director and Creativepreneur
- Sally Wongso – Storyboard Artist and Director
- Yudhatama – Animator

=== Film Critic Competition ===
- Budiyati Abiyoga – Producer
- Imam Tantowi – Director
- JB Kristanto – Journalist and Film Observer

=== Lifetime Achievement Award ===
- Agustina Kusuma Dewi – Lecturer
- Hariyadi – Lecturer
- Lala Palupi Santyaputri – Academician

== Winners and nominees ==
The nominations were announced on 19 October 2025 at the Produksi Film Negara headquarters in, Jakarta, Indonesia, by Ario Bayu, Prilly Latuconsina, Sheila Dara Aisha, Ringgo Agus Rahman, and Donne Maula.

Dystopian action thriller film The Siege at Thorn High and action crime thriller film The Shadow Strays tied for the most nominations, each receiving twelve. Jumbo became the first animated film to receive a nomination for the Citra Award for Best Picture.

=== Awards ===
Winners are listed first, highlighted in boldface, and indicated with a double dagger (‡).

Ringgo Agus Rahman became the first actor to win the Citra Award for Best Actor two years in a row, a distinction previously achieved by Deddy Mizwar in 1986 and 1987.

**Best Picture**: **On Your Lap – Arya Ibrahim and Gita Fara** ‡; Jumbo – Anggia Kharisma and Novia Puspa Sari; The Siege at Thorn High – Joko Anwar and Tia Hasibuan; Sore: A Wife from the Future – Suryana Paramita; This City Is a Battlefield – Rama Adi, Fauzan Zidni, Chand Parwez Servia, Willawati, and Tutut Kolopaking	**Best Director**: **Yandy Laurens – Sore: A Wife from the Future** ‡; Joko Anwar – The Siege at Thorn High; Mouly Surya – This City Is a Battlefield; Ryan Adriandhy – Jumbo; Timo Tjahjanto – The Shadow Strays
**Best Actor**: **Ringgo Agus Rahman – Call Me Dad as Dedi** ‡; Arswendy Bening Swara – Tale of the Land as Tuha; Dion Wiyoko – Sore: A Wife from the Future as Jonathan Riady; Morgan Oey – The Siege at Thorn High as Edwin; Nicholas Saputra – Siapa Dia as Layar / Nicolas / Kabel / Saputra	**Best Actress**: **Sheila Dara Aisha – Sore: A Wife from the Future as Sore** ‡; Acha Septriasa – Qodrat 2 as Azizah; Aurora Ribero – The Shadow Strays as 13 / Nomi; Claresta Taufan – On Your Lap as Sartika; Lola Amaria – Gowok: Javanese Kamasutra as Nya' Santi
**Best Supporting Actor**: **Omara Esteghlal – The Siege at Thorn High as Jefri** ‡; Boris Bokir – Call Me Dad as Tatang; Jerome Kurnia – This City Is a Battlefield as Hazil; Reza Rahadian – Gowok: Javanese Kamasutra as Kamanjaya	**Best Supporting Actress**: **Christine Hakim – On Your Lap as Maya** ‡; Artika Sari Devi – A Woman Called Mother as Yanti; Hana Malasan – The Shadow Strays as Umbra; Raihaanun – Gowok: Javanese Kamasutra as Nya' Ratri
**Best Original Screenplay**: **On Your Lap – Reza Rahadian and Felix K. Nesi** ‡; Better Off Dead – Kristo Immanuel and Jessica Tjiu; Gowok: Javanese Kamasutra – Hanung Bramantyo and Z.Z. Mulja Galih; Jumbo – Ryan Adriandhy and Widya Arifianti; The Shadow Strays – Timo Tjahjanto; The Siege at Thorn High – Joko Anwar	**Best Adapted Screenplay**: **Home Sweet Loan – Widya Arifianti and Sabrina Rochelle Kalangie; based on the novel by Almira Bastari** ‡; A Brother and 7 Siblings – Yandy Laurens; based on the television series by Arswendo Atmowiloto; Qodrat 2 – Asaf Antariksa, Gea Rexy, and Charles Gozali; based on the characters from the film Qodrat by Antariksa, Rexy, and Gozali; Sore: A Wife from the Future – Yandy Laurens; based on the web series by Laurens; This City Is a Battlefield – Mouly Surya; based on the novel A Road with No End by Mochtar Lubis
**Best Cinematography**: **The Siege at Thorn High – Ical Tanjung** ‡; The Shadow Strays – Batara Goempar; Siapa Dia – Muhammad Firdaus; Sore: A Wife from the Future – Dimas Bagus Triatma; This City Is a Battlefield – Roy Lolang	**Best Editing**: **Sore: A Wife from the Future – Hendra Adhi Susanto** ‡; Gowok: Javanese Kamasutra – Haris F. Syah and Wawan I. Wibowo; Home Sweet Loan – Aline Jusria; On Your Lap – Akhmad Fesdi Anggoro; The Shadow Strays – Dinda Amanda; The Siege at Thorn High – Joko Anwar, Erwin Prasetya Kurniawan, and Teguh Raharjo
**Best Visual Effects**: **The Siege at Thorn High – Abby Eldipie, Kalvin Irawan, Qanary Studio, LMN Studio, Gajafx, and NO3G Visual Effect** ‡; A Woman Called Mother – Bintang Adi Pradana; Qodrat 2 – Gaga Nugraha Ramadhan; The Shadow Strays – Mattebox Visualworks (Riza Thohariansyah and Rifandy Rasyid); This City Is a Battlefield – Muhammad Nur Huda	**Best Sound**: **Home Sweet Loan – Ridho Fachri and Indrasetno Vyatrantra** ‡; Better Off Dead – Syaifullah Praditya and Madunazka; Call Me Dad – Wahyu Tri Purnomo and Siti Asifa Nasution; The Shadow Strays – Arief Budi Santoso and Madunazka; The Siege at Thorn High – Anhar Moha; Rangga & Cinta – Satrio Budiono and Ichsan Rachmaditta
**Best Original Score**: **The Siege at Thorn High – Aghi Narottama** ‡; Jumbo – Ofel Obaja; On Your Lap – Ricky Lionardi; The Shadow Strays – Fajar Yuskemal; This City Is a Battlefield – Zeke Khaseli and Yudhi Arfani	**Best Theme Song**: **"Terbuang dalam Waktu" from Sore: A Wife from the Future – Gerald Situmorang, Iga Massardi, and Asteriska** ‡; "Berakhir di Aku" from Home Sweet Loan – Brigita Meliala; "Dengar Hatimu" from Jumbo – Ifa Fachir and Simhala Avadana; "Selalu Ada di Nadimu" from Jumbo – Anindyo Baskoro, Arya Aditya Ramadhya, and Ilman Ibrahim Isa; "Tegar" from Call Me Dad – Melly Goeslaw
**Best Art Direction**: **On Your Lap – Eros Eflin** ‡; A Brother and 7 Siblings – Dita Gambiro; Call Me Dad – Ahmad Zulkarnaen; The Shadow Strays – Antonius Boedy; The Siege at Thorn High – Dennis Sutanto; This City Is a Battlefield – Frans Paat	**Best Costume Design**: **The Shadow Strays – Victoria Esti Wahyuni** ‡; Call Me Dad – Hagai Pakan; Gowok: Javanese Kamasutra – Hagai Pakan; Siapa Dia – Retno Ratih Damayanti; This City Is a Battlefield – Meutia Pudjowarsito
**Best Makeup**: **The Siege at Thorn High – Novie Ariyanti** ‡; Gowok: Javanese Kamasutra – Fardillah Evariani; The Shadow Strays – Ernaka Puspita; Siapa Dia – Aktris Handradjasa; This City Is a Battlefield – Eba Sheba	**Best Live Action Short Film**: **Sammi, Who Can Detach His Body Parts – Rein Maychaelson, Ihsan Ibrahim, and Astrid Saerong** ‡; Fish, Please! – Haris Yulianto and Annisa Dewi; Hear the Ping Pong Sing – Andrew Kose and Livia Agatha; Little Rebels Cinema Club – Khozy Rizal, Hardy Yohansyah, Rayner Wijaya, and Gading Giarono; My Plastic Mother – Amar Haikal, Michael Rainheart, and Ardine L. Hakim
**Best Documentary Feature**: **Tambang Emas Ra Ritek – Alvina N. A. and Wahyu A. O.** ‡; Goodbye Tarling, Forgive Me Darling – Ismail Fahmi Lubis, Azhar Kinoi Lubis, and Sari Novita; Kidung Tani – Yoga Bagus Satatagama; Raminten Universe: Life is a Cabaret – Nia Dinata and Dena Rachman; Swaradwipa: Di Antara Bunyi dan Sunyi di Jagat Sumba – Titi Radjo Padmaja	**Best Documentary Short Film**: **Sie – Yosef Levi and Elsyn Puka** ‡; Satu Langkah Lagi – Alif Fauzan, Wahyu Juliansyah, and Lala Jasin; The Other Daughter – Fala Pratika and Fadhila Ristianty; Pendekar Daster Rombeng & Pendongeng Sakti – Fanny Chotimah and Steve Pillar Setiabudi; Sadiang Harus Pulang – Ulfa Evitasari and Rahmawati Addas
**Best Animated Feature**: **Jumbo – Ryan Adriandhy, Anggia Kharisma, and Novia Puspa Sari** ‡; Panji Tengkorak – Daryl Wilson and Frederica; Warkop DKI Kartun – Daryl Wilson and Frederica	**Best Animated Short Film**: **So I Pray – Amy Rahmadhita and Re:Anima** ‡; Get Money – Hansen Windarta; Kwartet: Gupala Sang Jagawana – Dieky Suprayogi and Oni Suandiko; Sanong Ingin ke Pesta – Firman Widyasmara; Wae – Limina Febriana
**Tanete Pong Masak Award for Best Film Critic**: **Catra Wardhana for Magdalene – "Rambut dalam Nana (2022), Tempat Trauma dan Rahasia Digelung Bersama"** ‡; Aurelia Gracia Novena for Magdalene – "Ilusi Kebebasan Perempuan dalam Gowok (2025)"; Catra Wardhana for Cinema Poetica – "20 Tahun Tentang Dia (2005): Membingkai Keintiman Sapphic di Indonesia 2000an"; Purwoko Ajie for Montase Film – "Tendangan, Pengkhianatan, dan Mimpi di Tengah Mafia: Alegori Elang (2025) dalam Psiko-Politik Sepak Bola Nusantara"; Raisa Kamila for Cinema Poetica – "SMONG Aceh (2024): Duka yang Tak Selesai dan Segala Ketangguhan Itu"	**Special Recognition at the Indonesian Film Festival – Final Jury Selection for Documentary Film**: **Satu Langkah Lagi – Alif Fauzan, Wahyu Juliansyah, and Lala Jasin**
**Antemas Award**: **Jumbo – Anggia Kharisma and Novia Puspa Sari**
**Lifetime Achievement Awards**: **El Manik**; **Franki Raden**; **Hendrick Gozali**

=== Audience awards ===
**Nya' Abbas Akup Award for Favorite Film**
**Rangga & Cinta – Riri Riza** ‡; List of nominees: 2nd Miracle in Cell No. 7 – Herwin Novianto; A Brother and 7 Siblings – Yandy Laurens; A Woman Called Mother – Randolph Zaini; Better Off Dead – Kristo Immanuel; Bolehkah Sekali Saja Kumenangis – Reka Wijaya; The Book of Sijjin and Illiyyin – Hadrah Daeng Ratu; Call Me Dad – Benni Setiawan; Gowok: Javanese Kamasutra – Hanung Bramantyo; Home Sweet Loan – Sabrina Rochelle Kalangie; Jumbo – Ryan Adriandhy; Komang – Naya Anindita; Mad of Madness – Eden Junjung; My Annoying Brother – Dinna Jasanti; On Your Lap – Reza Rahadian; Panji Tengkorak – Daryl Wilson; Qodrat 2 – Charles Gozali; Redemption of Sin – Yosep Anggi Noen; Siapa Dia – Garin Nugroho; Singsot: Siulan Kematian – Wahyu Agung Prasetyo; Sore: A Wife from the Future – Yandy Laurens; Tale of the Land – Loeloe Hendra; The Shadow Strays – Timo Tjahjanto; The Siege at Thorn High – Joko Anwar; This City Is a Battlefield – Mouly Surya
**Rachmat Hidajat Award for Favorite Actor**	**Mieke Widjaja Award for Favorite Actress**
**El Putra Sarira – Rangga & Cinta as Rangga** ‡; List of nominees: Adzando Davema – Komang as Arya; Aksara Dena – Mad of Madness as Jarot; Alex Suhendra – Mad of Madness as Bogel; Ali Fikry – A Woman Called Mother as Dino; Angga Yunanda – My Annoying Brother and Tale of the Land as Kemal Solihin and Yus; Antonio Blanco – Bolehkah Sekali Saja Kumenangis as Dimas; Ardhana Jovin A. H – Singsot: Siulan Kematian as Ipung; Ardit Erwandha – Better Off Dead as Ilham; Arie Kriting – Komang as Boy Laode; Ariyo Wahab – Home Sweet Loan as Kanendra; Arswendy Bening Swara – Tale of the Land as Tuha; Bhisma Mulia – Redemption of Sin as Ragus; Boris Bokir – Call Me Dad as Tatang; Bryan Domani – 2nd Miracle in Cell No. 7 as Asrul "Bule"; Budi Ros – Home Sweet Loan as Kaluna's father; Chicco Jerikho – This City Is a Battlefield as Isa; Chicco Kurniawan – A Brother and 7 Siblings as Hendarmoko; Denny Sumargo – 2nd Miracle in Cell No. 7 as Hendro Sanusi; Derby Romero – Home Sweet Loan as Danan; Devano Danendra – Gowok: Javanese Kamasutra and On Your Lap as young Kamanjaya and Gilang; Dewa Dayana – The Siege at Thorn High as Gerry Rahadi; Dion Wiyoko – Sore: A Wife from the Future as Jonathan Riady; Donny Alamsyah – Qodrat 2 as Sukardi; Endy Arfian – The Siege at Thorn High as Khristo Ramli; Fatih Unru – A Brother and 7 Siblings and The Siege at Thorn High as Woko and Rangga Kurnia; Fedi Nuril – On Your Lap as Hadi; Fredy Rotterdam – Mad of Madness as Pak Dhe; Indra Jegel – 2nd Miracle in Cell No. 7 as Atmo "Gepeng"; Indro Warkop – 2nd Miracle in Cell No. 7 as Japra "Foreman" Effendi; Iskak Khivano – A Woman Called Mother as Jamal; Jerome Kurnia – This City Is a Battlefield as Hazil; Jose Rizal Manua – On Your Lap as Jaya; Kiesha Alvaro – Komang as Raim Laode; Kiki Narendra – A Brother and 7 Siblings and The Siege at Thorn High as Atmo Wiloto and Abduh; Kristo Immanuel – Bolehkah Sekali Saja Kumenangis, My Annoying Brother, and The Shadow Strays as Agoy, Fauzan, and Jeki; Kukuh Prasetya Kudamai – Mad of Madness as Tino; Landung Simatupang – Singsot: Siulan Kematian as Mbah Lanang; Mario Caesar – Better Off Dead as Danu; Mathias Muchus – Komang, Sore: A Wife from the Future as Ode's father and Seno; Morgan Oey – The Siege at Thorn High and Siapa Dia as Edwin and Samo/ Ong; Muhadkly Acho – Better Off Dead as Cokro; Muhammad Bagus A. Saputra – Tale of the Land as Abang; Nabil Althaf – Mad of Madness as Bondan; Nadif H.S – A Brother and 7 Siblings as Rivano; Nicholas Saputra – Siapa Dia as Layar; Omara Esteghlal – The Siege at Thorn High and Better Off Dead as Jefri and Gema; Pradikta Wicaksono – Bolehkah Sekali Saja Kumenangis as Baskara; Qomarudin – Mad of Madness as Gofar; Rafi Sudirman – Rangga & Cinta as Borne; Rafly Altama – Rangga & Cinta as Mamet; Reza Rahadian – Gowok: Javanese Kamasutra as Kamanjaya; Rigen Rakelna – 2nd Miracle in Cell No. 7 as Yunus "Bewok"; Ringgo Agus Rahman – A Brother and 7 Siblings and Call Me Dad as Eka and Dedi; Rukman Rosadi – Mad of Madness as Komar; Seno Aji Julius – Mad of Madness as Dewo; Septian Dwi Cahyo – Qodrat 2 as Safih; Shakeel Fauzi Aisy – On Your Lap as Bayu; Simhala Avadana – Mad of Madness as Lukman; Sulthan Hamonangan – The Book of Sijjin and Illiyyin as Dean; Surya Saputra – Bolehkah Sekali Saja Kumenangis as Pras; Tarra Budiman – The Book of Sijjin and Illiyyin as Rudi; Teuku Rifnu Wikana – Qodrat 2 as Asu'ala; Tora Sudiro – 2nd Miracle in Cell No. 7 as Zaki; Vino G. Bastian – 2nd Miracle in Cell No. 7, My Annoying Brother, and Qodrat 2 as Dodo Roza, Jaya Solihin, and Ustadz Qodrat; Whani Darmawan – Mad of Madness as Broto; Yusuf Mahardika – Tale of the Land as Silas	**Leya Princy – Rangga & Cinta as Cinta** ‡; List of nominees: Acha Septriasa – Qodrat 2 as Azizah; Agla Artalidia – 2nd Miracle in Cell No. 7 as Linda; Alika Jantinia – Gowok: Javanese Kamasutra as young Ratri Sujita; Amanda Rawles – A Brother and 7 Siblings and Siapa Dia as Maurin Fidella and Rintik; Ariel Tatum – This City Is a Battlefield as Fatimah; Artika Sari Devi – A Woman Called Mother as Yanti; Aurora Ribero – A Woman Called Mother, Komang, and The Shadow Strays as Vira, Ade Widiandari, and 13/ Nomi; Ayu Laksmi – Komang as Meme; Ayushita Nugraha – 2nd Miracle in Cell No. 7 and Home Sweet Loan as Kemala Wibisono and Kamala; Caitlin Halderman – My Annoying Brother as Amanda; Christine Hakim – On Your Lap as Maya; Claresta Taufan – On Your Lap as Sartika; Cut Mini – Komang as Raim Laode's mother; Daisy Lantang – Home Sweet Loan as Kaluna's mother; Daniella Tumiwa – Rangga & Cinta as Karmen; Della Dartyan – Qodrat 2 as Purwanti; Dinda Kanya Dewi – The Book of Sijjin and Illiyyin as Laras; Dominique Sanda – Bolehkah Sekali Saja Kumenangis as Devi; Fita Anggriani – Home Sweet Loan as Miya; Freya JKT48 – A Brother and 7 Siblings as Nina; Graciella Abigail – 2nd Miracle in Cell No. 7 as Kartika Rozak; Hana Pitrashata Malasan – The Siege at Thorn High and The Shadow Strays as Valdiana Rahardjo and Umbra; Hana Saraswati – Qodrat 2 as Sri Wahyuni; Happy Salma – Redemption of Sin as Wening; Imelda Therinne – This City Is a Battlefield as Mayang; Ina Marika – Home Sweet Loan as Natya; Jasmine Nadya – Rangga & Cinta as Alya; Katyana Mawira – Rangga & Cinta as Milly; Kawai Labiba – A Brother and 7 Siblings and The Book of Sijjin and Illiyyin as Gadis and Tika; Keiko Ananta – Redemption of Sin as Nirmala; Kyandra Sembel – Rangga & Cinta as Maura; Laksmi Notokusumo – Redemption of Sin as Uti Yah; Lola Amaria – Gowok: Javanese Kamasutra as Nyai Santi; Marsha Timothy – 2nd Miracle in Cell No. 7 as Juwita "Ibu Uwi"; Maudy Koesnaedi – A Brother and 7 Siblings as Agnes; Mawar De Jongh – Better Off Dead as Kerin; Maya Hasan – Sore: A Wife from the Future as Maya; Myesha Lin – Call Me Dad as young Intan; Nada Novia – Better Off Dead as Naya; Neneng Risma – Komang as Ola; Niken Anjani – A Brother and 7 Siblings as Osa; Nirina Zubir – Better Off Dead as Ayu; Prilly Latuconsina – Bolehkah Sekali Saja Kumenangis as Tari; Putri Marino – Redemption of Sin as Tirta; Raihaanun – Mad of Madness and Gowok: Javanese Kamasutra as Ambar and Ratri Sujita; Risty Tagor – Home Sweet Loan as Tanish; Satine Zaneta – The Siege at Thorn High as Dorothy "Dotty" Susatyo; Sheila Dara Aisha – Sore: A Wife from the Future as Sore; Sheila Kusnadi – The Siege at Thorn High as teenager Silvi; Shenina Cinnamon – Tale of The Land as May; Shindy Huang – The Siege at Thorn High and Better Off Dead as Vera Lestama and Adriana; Sita Nursanti – A Woman Called Mother and Call Me Dad as Medea and Rossa; Siti Fauziah – Singsot: Siulan Kematian as Wiwik; Sri Isworowati – Singsot: Siulan Kematian as Mbah Wedok; Tissa Biani – Call Me Dad as adult Intan; Ummi Quary – Bolehkah Sekali Saja Kumenangis as Icha; Widi Mulia – Bolehkah Sekali Saja Kumenangis and Siapa Dia as Nina and Demok; Yunita Siregar – Home Sweet Loan and The Book of Sijjin and Illiyyin as Kaluna and Yuli

== Films with multiple nominations and awards ==
Films that received multiple nominations (excluding audience awards)
Nominations	Film
12	The Shadow Strays
12	The Siege at Thorn High
10	This City Is a Battlefield
8	Sore: A Wife from the Future
7	Gowok: Javanese Kamasutra
7	Jumbo
7	On Your Lap
6	Call Me Dad
4	Home Sweet Loan
4	Siapa Dia
3	Qodrat 2
2	Better Off Dead
2	A Brother and 7 Siblings
2	A Woman Called Mother

Films with multiple wins (excluding audience and non-competitive awards)
Awards	Film
5	The Siege at Thorn High
4	On Your Lap
4	Sore: A Wife from the Future
2	Home Sweet Loan

Films with multiple wins (overall wins)
Awards	Film
5	The Siege at Thorn High
4	On Your Lap
4	Sore: A Wife from the Future
3	Rangga & Cinta
2	Home Sweet Loan
2	Jumbo

== Presenters and performers ==
The following individuals, listed in order of appearance, presented awards or performed musical numbers:

Presenters
Name(s)	Role
Mawar Eva de Jongh	Presented the awards for Best Animated Short Film, Best Animated Feature, and Best Live Action Short Film
Sheila Timothy	Presented the awards for Best Costume Design and Best Makeup
Marissa Anita	Presented the award for Best Supporting Actress
Winky Wiryawan	Presented the award for Best Supporting Actor
Alex Abbad	Presented the awards for Best Visual Effects and Best Editing
Wregas Bhanuteja	Presented the awards for Best Art Direction and Best Cinematography
Rano Karno	Presented the award for Lifetime Achievement Awards
Widuri Puteri	Presented the Mieke Widjaja Award for Favorite Actress
Ali Fikry	Presented the Rachmat Hidajat Award for Favorite Actor
Donny Damara	Presented the Tanete Pong Masak Award for Best Film Critic and Nya' Abbas Akup Award for Favorite Film
Happy Salma; Ahmad Mahendra	Presented the Antemas Award
Ratih Kumala	Presented the awards for Best Original Screenplay and Best Adapted Screenplay
Maudy Ayunda	Presented the awards for Best Documentary Short Film, Special Recognition at the Indonesian Film Festival – Final Jury Selection for Documentary Film, and Best Documentary Feature
Sherina Munaf	Presented the awards for Best Original Score, Best Theme Song, and Best Sound
Teuku Rifnu Wikana	Presented the award for Best Actor
Maudy Koesnaedi	Presented the award for Best Actress
Kamila Andini	Presented the award for Best Director
Allan Sebastian; Cesa David Luckmansyah; Dewi Umaya; Nungki Kusumastuti; Nurman Hakim; Salman Aristo; Titi Radjo Padmadja; Whani Darmawan; Yunus Pasolang	Presented the award for Best Picture

Performers
Name(s)	Role	Work
Sherina Munaf	Musical director	
Prince Poetiray; Quinn Salman	Performer	"Selalu Ada di Hatimu" "Dengar Hatimu" from Jumbo
Idgitaf	Performer	"Berakhir di Aku" from Home Sweet Loan
Barasuara	Performer	"Terbuang dalam Waktu" from Sore: A Wife from the Future
Barsena Bestandhi; Dux Stella Voce Choir	Performer	"Ruang Baru" during the "In Memoriam" tribute
Rossa	Performer	"Tegar" from Call Me Dad
Armand Maulana	Performer	"Citra"
