= This City Is a Battlefield =

2025 film by Mouly Surya

- Theatrical release poster
- Indonesian: Perang Kota
- Directed by: Mouly Surya
- Written by: Mouly Surya
- Based on: A Road with No End by Mochtar Lubis
- Produced by: Rama Adi; Fauzan Zidni; Chand Parwez Servia; Tutut Kolopaking
- Starring: Chicco Jerikho; Ariel Tatum; Jerome Kurnia
- Cinematography: Roy Lolang
- Edited by: Natalie Soh; Robert Grigsby Wilson
- Music by: Zeke Khaseli; Yudhi Arfani
- Production companies: Cinesurya; Starvision Plus; Kaninga Pictures
- Release dates: 8 February 2025 (Rotterdam); 30 April 2025 (Indonesia)
- Running time: 119 minutes
- Countries: Indonesia; Netherlands; Singapore; France; Norway; Philippines; Cambodia
- Language: Indonesian

This City Is a Battlefield (Indonesian: Perang Kota, Dutch: Djakarta 1946) is a 2025 Indonesian war drama film written and directed by Mouly Surya. The film is an adaptation of Jalan Tak Ada Ujung by Mochtar Lubis and is set in 1946, a year after Indonesia proclaimed independence from Dutch and Japanese occupation.

The film served as the closing film of the 54th International Film Festival Rotterdam on 8 February 2025, followed by a theatrical release in Indonesia on 30 April 2025. It received ten nominations at the 2025 Indonesian Film Festival, including Best Picture.

== Synopsis ==
Set in Jakarta in 1946, Isa, a 35-year-old former fighter and a violinist, is now an elementary school teacher. His service during the war for independence leaves him with a reputation as a seasoned soldier. His trauma, however, leaves him with impotence.

== Cast ==
- Chicco Jerikho as Isa
- Ariel Tatum as Fatimah
- Jerome Kurnia as Hazil
- Rukman Rosadi as Kamaruddin
- Imelda Therinne as Mayang
- Faiz Vishal as Rakhmat
- Anggun Priambodo as Semedi
- Indra Birowo as Abdullah
- Alex Abbad as Tentara Sepoy
- Dea Panendra as Panca Tirta's wife
- Ar Barrani Lintang as Salim
- Chew Kin Wah as Baba Tan
- Sheila Kusnadi as Baba Tan's daughter

== Production ==
The film marks Mouly Surya's first project that is based on an existing material. To fund the project, Surya sought funding from several sources, such as the Hubert Bals Fund, who also funded her sophomore release What They Don't Talk About When They Talk About Love in 2013. Additionally, Bangkok-based Purin Pictures also announced in 2020 that they selected the project to receive a US$30,000 production grant.

== Release ==
This City Is a Battlefield began production in late 2019 and was set for a 2020 release. However, it was pushed back due to the COVID-19 pandemic. In March 2021, Surya stated on Twitter that the film is likely to be pushed back due to the COVID-19 situation.

The film had its world premiere as the closing film of the 54th International Film Festival Rotterdam on 8 February 2025. On 30 April 2025, it was released theatrically in Indonesia.

The film is also selected at the 24th New York Asian Film Festival to be held from July 11 to July 27, 2025 for its North American Premiere.

== Accolades ==
Award / Film Festival	Date of ceremony	Category	Recipient(s)	Result	Ref.
Festival Film Bandung	31 October 2025	Highly Commended Leading Actress	Ariel Tatum	Nominated	
Festival Film Bandung	31 October 2025	Highly Commended Supporting Actor	Jerome Kurnia	Won	
Festival Film Bandung	31 October 2025	Highly Commended Cinematography	Roy Lolang	Won	
Festival Film Bandung	31 October 2025	Highly Commended Art Direction	Frans X. R. Paat	Nominated	
Festival Film Bandung	31 October 2025	Highly Commended Original Score	Yudhi Arfani and Zeke Khaseli	Nominated	
Indonesian Film Festival	20 November 2025	Best Picture	Rama Adi, Fauzan Zidni, Chand Parwez Servia, Willawati, and Tutut Kolopaking	Nominated	
Indonesian Film Festival	20 November 2025	Best Director	Mouly Surya	Nominated	
Indonesian Film Festival	20 November 2025	Best Supporting Actor	Jerome Kurnia	Nominated	
Indonesian Film Festival	20 November 2025	Best Adapted Screenplay	Mouly Surya	Nominated	
Indonesian Film Festival	20 November 2025	Best Cinematography	Roy Lolang	Nominated	
Indonesian Film Festival	20 November 2025	Best Visual Effects	Muhammad Nur Huda	Nominated	
Indonesian Film Festival	20 November 2025	Best Original Score	Zeke Khaseli and Yudhi Arfani	Nominated	
Indonesian Film Festival	20 November 2025	Best Art Direction	Frans XR Paat	Nominated	
Indonesian Film Festival	20 November 2025	Best Costume Design	Meutia Pudjowarsito	Nominated	
Indonesian Film Festival	20 November 2025	Best Makeup	Eba Sheba	Nominated	
Film Pilihan Tempo	26 January 2026	Best Supporting Actor	Jerome Kurnia	Nominated	
