= On Your Lap =

2025 film by Reza Rahadian

- Promotional poster
- Indonesian: Pangku
- Directed by: Reza Rahadian
- Written by: Reza Rahadian; Felix K. Nesi
- Produced by: Arya Ibrahim; Gita Fara
- Starring: Claresta Taufan; Fedi Nuril; Christine Hakim; Shakeel Fauzi; Devano Danendra
- Cinematography: Teoh Gay Hian
- Edited by: Akhmad Fesdi Anggoro
- Music by: Ricky Lionardi
- Production company: Gambar Gerak
- Distributed by: Antenna Entertainment (Malaysia)
- Release dates: 20 September 2025 (Busan); 6 November 2025 (Indonesia)
- Running time: 100 minutes
- Country: Indonesia

On Your Lap (Indonesian: Pangku) is a 2025 Indonesian drama film directed by Reza Rahadian in his feature directorial debut from a screenplay he wrote with Felix K. Nesi. The film stars Claresta Taufan as Sartika, a young mother who works as a lap coffee waitress.

The film had its world premiere at the 30th Busan International Film Festival at the Visions – Asia section on 20 September 2025, where it won four awards. It was released in Indonesian theatres on 6 November 2025. It won the Best Picture at the 2025 Indonesian Film Festival alongside three other awards.

== Premise ==
Set against the backdrop of the Indonesian economic crisis in 1998, a young woman works as a kopi pangku waitress, where women sit on men's laps as they drink coffee, hoping to secure a better life for her family.

== Cast ==
- Claresta Taufan as Sartika
- Fedi Nuril as Hadi
- Christine Hakim as Maya
- Shakeel Fauzi as Bayu
- Devano Danendra as Gilang

== Production ==
The idea for On Your Lap was conceived by Reza Rahadian after he saw the kopi pangku shops while filming around the Pantura area in 2020. Principal photography began in November 2024.

The project participated during the 2024 JAFF Market during the 19th Jogja-NETPAC Asian Film Festival. It also participated at the 2025 Hong Kong—Asia Film Financing Forum where it was selected as one of the projects to be presented at the Marché du Film. It was selected to participate for Far East in Progress of Focus Asia during the Far East Film Festival. The project won a post-production grant at the 2025 Red Sea Fund.

== Release ==
On Your Lap had its world premiere at the 30th Busan International Film Festival at the Visions – Asia section on 20 September 2025. It was released in Indonesian theatres on 6 November 2025.

== Accolades ==
Award / Film Festival	Date of ceremony	Category	Recipient(s)	Result	Ref.
Busan International Film Festival	26 September 2025	KB Vision Audience Award	Reza Rahadian	Won	
Busan International Film Festival	26 September 2025	FIPRESCI Award	Reza Rahadian	Won	
Busan International Film Festival	26 September 2025	Bishkek International Film Festival-Central Asia Union Award	Reza Rahadian	Won	
Busan International Film Festival	26 September 2025	Face of the Future Award	Reza Rahadian	Won	
QCinema International Film Festival	19 November 2025	NETPAC Jury Prize for Best Asian First Film	Reza Rahadian	Won	
Indonesian Film Festival	20 November 2025	Best Picture	Arya Ibrahim and Gita Fara	Won	
Indonesian Film Festival	20 November 2025	Best Actress	Claresta Taufan	Nominated	
Indonesian Film Festival	20 November 2025	Best Supporting Actress	Christine Hakim	Won	
Indonesian Film Festival	20 November 2025	Best Original Screenplay	Reza Rahadian and Felix K. Nesi	Won	
Indonesian Film Festival	20 November 2025	Best Editing	Akhmad Fesdi Anggoro	Nominated	
Indonesian Film Festival	20 November 2025	Best Original Score	Ricky Lionardi	Nominated	
Indonesian Film Festival	20 November 2025	Best Art Direction	Eros Eflin	Won	
Film Pilihan Tempo	26 January 2026	Film Pilihan Tempo	On Your Lap	Won	
Film Pilihan Tempo	26 January 2026	Best Director	Reza Rahadian	Won	
Film Pilihan Tempo	26 January 2026	Best Screenplay	Reza Rahadian and Felix K. Nesi	Nominated	
Film Pilihan Tempo	26 January 2026	Best Actress	Claresta Taufan	Won	
Film Pilihan Tempo	26 January 2026	Best Supporting Actor	Devano Danendra	Nominated	
Film Pilihan Tempo	26 January 2026	Best Supporting Actor	Jose Rizal Manua	Nominated	
Film Pilihan Tempo	26 January 2026	Best Supporting Actress	Christine Hakim	Won	
Festival Film Bandung	22 August 2026	Highly Commended Film	On Your Lap	Pending	
Festival Film Bandung	22 August 2026	Highly Commended Director	Reza Rahadian	Pending	
Festival Film Bandung	22 August 2026	Highly Commended Leading Actress	Claresta Taufan	Pending	
Festival Film Bandung	22 August 2026	Highly Commended Supporting Actress	Christine Hakim	Pending	
Festival Film Bandung	22 August 2026	Highly Commended Screenplay	Reza Rahadian and Felix K. Nesi	Pending	
Festival Film Bandung	22 August 2026	Highly Commended Art Direction	Eros Eflin	Pending	
