= Call Me Dad =

2025 drama film by Benni Setiawan

- Theatrical release poster
- Indonesian: Panggil Aku Ayah
- Directed by: Benni Setiawan
- Written by: Rifki Ardisha
- Based on: Pawn by Yoon Je-kyoon
- Produced by: Anggia Kharisma; Novia Puspa Sari
- Starring: Ringgo Agus Rahman; Boris Bokir; Tissa Biani; Myesha Lin
- Cinematography: Arnand Pratikto
- Edited by: Hendra Adhi Susanto
- Music by: Ifa Fachir; Adrian Martadinata
- Production companies: Visinema Studios; CJ ENM; Legacy Pictures; CBI Pictures; Anami Films; Indopictures Studio
- Release date: 7 August 2025 (Indonesia)
- Running time: 120 minutes
- Country: Indonesia
- Language: Indonesian

Call Me Dad (Indonesian: Panggil Aku Ayah) is a 2025 drama film directed by Benni Setiawan from a screenplay written by Rifki Ardisha. It is an Indonesian remake film of the 2020 South Korean film Pawn. It stars Ringgo Agus Rahman, Boris Bokir, Tissa Biani, and Myesha Lin.

The film was released in Indonesian theatres on 7 August 2025. It received six nominations at the 2025 Indonesian Film Festival and won a Citra Award for Best Actor for Rahman.

== Premise ==
Two debt collectors are forced to care for a young child who has been left as collateral for the debts of her mother.

== Cast ==
- Ringgo Agus Rahman as Dedi
- Boris Bokir as Tatang
- Myesha Lin as Intan
  - Tissa Biani as adult Intan
- Sita Nursanti as Rossalinda, Intan's mother

== Production ==
In April 2025, it was reported that Visinema Pictures would produce an Indonesian remake of the 2020 South Korean film Pawn, with Benni Setiawan attached to direct. Principal photography entirely took place in Sukabumi, West Java. Director, Benni Setiawan, said that Sukabumi was selected as the filming location due to its authentic atmosphere, which can represent Indonesia during the 1980s and 1990s. Legacy Pictures, Anami Films, CBI Pictures and Indopictures Studio financed the film.

== Release ==
The film was released in Indonesian theatres on 7 August 2025. It garnered more than 442,000 admissions during its first eight days of release. It received 867,191 admissions during its theatrical run.

The film was released digitally on Netflix on 5 December 2025.

== Accolades ==
| Award / Film Festival | Date of ceremony | Category | Recipient(s) | Result | Ref. |
|---|---|---|---|---|---|
| Festival Film Bandung | 31 October 2025 | Highly Commended Leading Actor | Ringgo Agus Rahman | Nominated | |
| Indonesian Film Festival | 20 November 2025 | Best Actor | Ringgo Agus Rahman | Won | |
| Indonesian Film Festival | 20 November 2025 | Best Supporting Actor | Boris Bokir | Nominated | |
| Indonesian Film Festival | 20 November 2025 | Best Sound | Wahyu Tri Purnomo and Siti Asifa Nasution | Nominated | |
| Indonesian Film Festival | 20 November 2025 | Best Theme Song | "Tegar" by Melly Goeslaw | Nominated | |
| Indonesian Film Festival | 20 November 2025 | Best Art Direction | Ahmad Zulkarnaen | Nominated | |
| Indonesian Film Festival | 20 November 2025 | Best Costume Design | Hagai Pakan | Nominated | |
| Film Pilihan Tempo | 26 January 2026 | Best Actor | Ringgo Agus Rahman | Nominated | |
