= A Woman Called Mother =

2025 horror film by Randolph Zaini

- Theatrical release poster
- Indonesian: Dia Bukan Ibu
- Directed by: Randolph Zaini
- Written by: Titien Wattimena; Randolph Zaini; Beta Inggrid Ayu Ningtyas
- Based on: Thread on X by Jeropoint
- Produced by: Raam Punjabi; Ken Manwani; Amrit Punjabi
- Starring: Artika Sari Devi; Aurora Ribero; Ali Fikry
- Cinematography: Amalia T. S.
- Edited by: Reynaldi Christanto
- Music by: Elwin Hendrijanto
- Production company: MVP Pictures
- Release dates: 19 September 2025 (Fantastic Fest); 25 September 2025 (Indonesia)
- Running time: 119 minutes
- Country: Indonesia
- Language: Indonesian

A Woman Called Mother (Indonesian: Dia Bukan Ibu) is a 2025 Indonesian psychological horror film directed by Randolph Zaini. He, along with Titien Wattimena and Beta Inggrid Ayu Ningtyas, co-wrote the screenplay based on a thread posted by Jeropoint on X. It stars Artika Sari Devi, Aurora Ribero, and Ali Fikry.

The film had its world premiere at the Fantastic Fest on 19 September 2025. It was theatrically released in Indonesia on 25 September 2025. It received two nominations at the 2025 Indonesian Film Festival for Best Supporting Actress for Devi and Best Visual Effects.

== Premise ==
Two children move into a new house with their mother after their parents' divorce. As time passes, they begin to feel that their mother is no longer the person they once knew.

== Cast ==
- Artika Sari Devi as Yanti
- Aurora Ribero as Vira
  - Fara Shakila as little Vira
- Ali Fikry as Dino
- Khiva Iskak as Jamal

== Production ==
In September 2024, it was reported that MVP Pictures would adapt an X thread written by Jeropoint, with Randolph Zaini attached to direct. This marks Artika Sari Devi's first film appearance in six years, following Perjanjian Dengan Iblis in 2019.

Principal photography took place in Subang Regency, West Java.

== Release ==
A Woman Called Mother had its world premiere on 19 September 2025 at the Fantastic Fest, competing at the Next Wave Competition. The film was theatrically released in Indonesia on 25 September 2025. It garnered 119,767 admissions during its theatrical run.

The film was distributed in Netflix on 5 February 2026.

== Accolades ==
| Award / Film Festival | Date of ceremony | Category | Recipient(s) | Result | Ref. |
|---|---|---|---|---|---|
| Indonesian Film Festival | 20 November 2025 | Best Supporting Actress | Artika Sari Devi | Nominated | |
| Indonesian Film Festival | 20 November 2025 | Best Visual Effects | Bintang Adi Pradana | Nominated | |
