= A Brother and 7 Siblings =

2024 drama film

- Theatrical release poster
- Indonesian: 1 Kakak 7 Ponakan
- Directed by: Yandy Laurens
- Written by: Yandy Laurens
- Based on: 1 Kakak 7 Ponakan by Arswendo Atmowiloto
- Produced by: Lachman G. Samtani; Suryana Paramita; Manoj K. Samtani; Deepak G. Samtani
- Starring: Chicco Kurniawan
- Cinematography: Dimas Bagus Triatma
- Edited by: Hendra Adhi Susanto
- Music by: Ofel Obaja Setiawan
- Production companies: Mandela Pictures; Cerita Films; Legacy Pictures; VMS Studio; Masih Belajar Pictures; Rhaya Flicks; Infia; Volix Pictures; Stickearn
- Release dates: 7 December 2024 (Jogja); 23 January 2025 (Indonesia)
- Running time: 131 minutes
- Country: Indonesia
- Language: Indonesian

A Brother and 7 Siblings (Indonesian: 1 Kakak 7 Ponakan) is a 2024 drama film, written and directed by Yandy Laurens, based on the 1996 sinetron of the same name (A Sister and 7 Siblings) by Arswendo Atmowiloto. The film stars Chicco Kurniawan as a man who suddenly has to take care of his nieces and nephews after the death of his older sister.

The film had its world premiere as the closing film of 19th Jogja-NETPAC Asian Film Festival on 7 December 2024. It was theatrically released in Indonesia on 23 January 2025.

== Plot ==
Moko lives with his sister Agnes’s family, which consists of Agnes, her husband Atmo, their two children Woko and Nina, and Atmo’s nephew, Rivano—better known as Ano. During Moko’s final thesis defence, his girlfriend Maurin receives an urgent call from the family: Atmo and Agnes have been rushed to the hospital. Atmo dies of a heart condition, while Agnes passes away shortly after giving birth to their third daughter, Ima.

Suddenly, Moko finds himself the de facto head of the household. He puts aside his plans to pursue a master's degree abroad with Maurin to care for his nieces, nephews, and newborn baby. His older sister Osa, who lives in Australia with her husband Eka, calls to inform him that they won’t be returning to Indonesia anytime soon, as Eka can’t leave his job.

Moko briefly lands a job as an architect, but struggles to balance work and childcare. His responsibilities at home cause him to be late for an important client meeting, and he is eventually let go. Realizing he’s holding Maurin back, he ends their relationship. Just as he’s adjusting to his new reality, his childhood piano teacher, Nanang, asks him to take in his daughter, Gadis, who goes with Ais. Moko accepts, adding yet another member to his already growing household.

Two years pass. Life starts to settle down, and Ima is now old enough to need less constant supervision. Moko begins applying for full-time jobs again, and coincidentally, one of the companies he interviews with is where Maurin now works. She notices him during the interview process and enthusiastically recommends him to her boss, Mr. Sam.

As they reconnect, Moko shares updates about his family: Nina, who clashed with him after a painful breakup; Woko, who works as an online motorcycle driver to support his siblings, shelving his dream of studying law; Ano, who aspires to become an architect like Moko; and Ais, the newest member of the family.

Preparing for a key presentation for the job, Maurin offers to lend Moko her MacBook Pro, knowing the design software at the firm is demanding. Moko declines, saying he plans to buy a used laptop. However, those plans are derailed when Ano suddenly falls ill and is diagnosed with appendicitis. With their national health insurance (BPJS) inactive, Moko has to use his laptop savings to cover the hospital bills.

He tries to prepare the presentation on his old laptop, but it keeps crashing. That night, Maurin shows up with her laptop and stays overnight to help care for the still-recovering Ano while Moko works on the project. Thanks to her support, he delivers a successful presentation and lands the job. He comes home that evening with martabak to celebrate—only to find that Osa and Eka have returned from Australia.

The family later takes a short vacation to a resort owned by one of Moko’s clients. There, Erna—a resort employee—recognizes Ais and turns out to be her and Nanang's relative. She reveals that she and her husband want to take care of Ais. Eka suggests that Erna take over caring for Ais.

Moko is then assigned to a project in Anyer, which means being away from his family for a while. While he’s gone, Eka frequently calls asking for money for household expenses, while Moko finds it increasingly difficult to reach his nieces and nephews. When the project wraps up, Moko is asked to present it to the client, a resort owner. However, a disagreement with the resort owner leads to Moko being removed from the meeting and reprimanded by Mr. Sam.

Sensing something is wrong back home, Moko decides to return. On his way, he visits Ais and learns the truth: since Moko left, Woko, Nina, and Ano have all been working to keep the household running. Moko is stunned and immediately picks each of them up from their respective jobs.

Back at home, he finds out that Eka has been missing for two months after falling victim to an investment scam. Moko gathers the kids in the living room and insists they stop working—he wants to be the sole provider for the family. However, one by one, they speak up, expressing their desire to contribute and not be a burden.

Maurin steps in to share her perspective. She agrees with Moko’s sentiment that no one in the family is a burden, but disagrees with his belief that he must carry everything alone. She admits she never stopped fighting for a future with him and reminds the family that it’s okay—even necessary—for everyone to support one another.

In the end, Moko and his nieces and nephews embrace—reaffirming their love and commitment to face life’s challenges together.

Moko reflects on the early days of moving into the house. Over time, Osa begins to reconnect with her family, and their relationships grow warmer. One day, Moko watches his family gathered around the dinner table, laughing together—and realizes that, despite everything, they’re home.

== Cast ==
- Chicco Kurniawan as Hendarmoko "Moko": young architect who must balance his career and his niblings after the death of his sister and brother in-law.
- Amanda Rawles as Maurin Fidella: Moko's rich and supportive girlfriend.
- Fatih Unru as Woko: Moko's nephew and the oldest son of Agnes and Atmo.
- Freya JKT48 as Nina: Moko's niece and middle daughter of Agnes and Atmo.
- Ahmad Nadif as Rivano "Ano": Atmo's nephew who lives with Moko.
- Kawai Labiba as Gadis "Ais": daughter of Moko's former piano teacher who lives with him.
- Ringgo Agus Rahman as Eka: Moko's brother-in-law and husband of Osa. Previously, Eka worked as a driver in Australia until he and his wife moved to Indonesia.
- Niken Anjani as Osa: Moko's sister and wife of Eka.
- Kiki Narendra as Atmo Wiloto: Moko's late brother-in-law, husband of Agnes and father of Woko, Nina and Imah. He died of a heart attack shortly before Imah was born.
- Maudy Koesnaedi as Agnes: Moko's late sister, wife of Atmo and mother of Woko, Nina and Imah. She died after giving birth to Imah.
- Alaztha Hazel Azalea as Imah: Moko's niece and the youngest daughter of Agnes and Atmo.
- Ence Bagus as Nanang: Moko's former piano teacher and father of Ais.
- Reza Nangin as Sam
- Chandra Satrya as Albert
- David GadgetIn as David

== Production ==
In July 2024, it was announced that Yandy Laurens would direct an adaptation of the 60-episode 1990s sinetron 1 Kakak 7 Ponakan, created by Arswendo Atmowiloto. It is the second of Atmowiloto's sinetron to be adapted into feature film by Laurens, following Cemara's Family (2018). Principal photography began in July 2024 in Jakarta, Indonesia. This film is coproduced by Mandela Pictures, Cerita Films, and Legacy Pictures. Laurens said that he was initially interested in it due to its unique title, which pushed him to know more about it. He said that its plot will be more relevant nowadays due to the sandwich generation phenomenon.

In pre-production, the actors lived under one roof for five days to study the script and improve chemistry. A lot of Maurin's dialogue is developed from Rawles' ideas. To enhance realism, the production involved a baby less than 1 year old as Ima, Moko's youngest sibling. Yandy also inserted some easter eggs from Arswendo's works, like Atmo reading Senopati Pamungkas in one of the opening scenes and the soundtrack of the original sinetron "Jangan Risaukan" being sung in one scene.

== Release ==
A Brother and 7 Siblings had its world premiere as the closing film of 19th Jogja-NETPAC Asian Film Festival on 7 December 2024. The screenings were held in five auditoriums at Empire XXI, Yogyakarta, and the tickets were sold out within two hours.

The film was released in Indonesian theatres on 23 January 2025. It exceeded a million admissions after seventeen days of release. Netflix acquired the film's distribution rights, releasing it on 10 July 2025. The film made its linear television premiere on SCTV on 25 August 2026 at 1.35 pm local time.

== Accolades ==
| Award / Film Festival | Date of ceremony | Category | Recipient(s) | Result | Ref. |
|---|---|---|---|---|---|
| Film Pilihan Tempo | 5 February 2025 | Best Actor | Chicco Kurniawan | Nominated | |
| Festival Film Bandung | 31 October 2025 | Highly Commended Leading Actor | Chicco Kurniawan | Nominated | |
| Festival Film Bandung | 31 October 2025 | Highly Commended Supporting Actress | Amanda Rawles | Nominated | |
| Indonesian Film Festival | 20 November 2025 | Best Adapted Screenplay | Yandy Laurens | Nominated | |
| Indonesian Film Festival | 20 November 2025 | Best Art Direction | Dita Gambiro | Nominated | |
