= Siapa Dia =

2025 musical film by Garin Nugroho

- Theatrical release poster
- Directed by: Garin Nugroho
- Written by: Garin Nugroho
- Produced by: Faizal Lubis; Marlia Nurdiyani; Oscar Sagita
- Starring: Nicholas Saputra; Amanda Rawles; Morgan Oey; Widi Mulia
- Cinematography: Muhammad Firdaus
- Edited by: Andhy Pulung; Rozi Anwar
- Music by: Faizal Lubis
- Production companies: Fabis Entertainment; 909 Studio
- Release date: 28 August 2025 (Indonesia)
- Running time: 102 minutes
- Country: Indonesia
- Language: Indonesian

Siapa Dia is a 2025 historical musical film written and directed by Garin Nugroho. It stars Nicholas Saputra as Layar, a jaded film star.

The film was theatrically released in Indonesia on 28 August 2025. It received four nominations at the 2025 Indonesian Film Festival, including Best Actor for Saputra.

== Premise ==
A jaded actor finds a family heirloom suitcase and gets inspired to develop a musical centered on the history of Indonesian politics and cinema.

== Cast ==
- Nicholas Saputra as Layar / Nicolas / Kabel / Saputra
- Amanda Rawles as Rintik
- Morgan Oey as Samo
- Ariel Tatum as Anna
- Widi Mulia as Denok
- Gisella Anastasia as Mul
- Monita Tahalea as Nurlela
- Dira Sugandi as Sari
- Happy Salma as Juwita

== Production ==
In October 2022, it was reported that Garin Nugroho was developing his first musical film under the working title Melodrama, which was planned for release in 2023. In March 2023, Nugroho released the first look at the film, with Nicholas Saputra attached to star.

In March 2025, producer Faizal Lubis announced that the film's release had been cancelled for undisclosed reasons. However, the decision was later overturned, and the film was released theatrically in August 2025.

== Release ==
Siapa Dia was released theatrically in Indonesia on 28 August 2025. It garnered 7,462 admissions during its theatrical run. It screened at the Indonesian Film Showcase of the 20th Jogja-NETPAC Asian Film Festival.

== Accolades ==
Award / Film Festival	Date of ceremony	Category	Recipient(s)	Result	Ref.
Festival Film Bandung	31 October 2025	Highly Commended Film	Siapa Dia	Nominated	
Festival Film Bandung	31 October 2025	Highly Commended Leading Actor	Nicholas Saputra	Nominated	
Festival Film Bandung	31 October 2025	Highly Commended Art Direction	Edy Wibowo	Won	
Indonesian Film Festival	20 November 2025	Best Actor	Nicholas Saputra	Nominated	
Indonesian Film Festival	20 November 2025	Best Cinematography	Muhammad Firdaus	Nominated	
Indonesian Film Festival	20 November 2025	Best Costume Design	Retno Ratih Damayanti	Nominated	
Indonesian Film Festival	20 November 2025	Best Makeup	Aktris Handradjasa	Nominated	
Indonesian Movie Actors Awards	26 November 2025	Best Ensemble	Siapa Dia	Nominated	
Indonesian Movie Actors Awards	26 November 2025	Favorite Film	Siapa Dia	Nominated	
Indonesian Movie Actors Awards	26 November 2025	Best Actor	Nicholas Saputra	Nominated	
Indonesian Movie Actors Awards	26 November 2025	Favorite Actor	Nicholas Saputra	Nominated	
Indonesian Movie Actors Awards	26 November 2025	Best Supporting Actor	Morgan Oey	Won	
Indonesian Movie Actors Awards	26 November 2025	Favorite Supporting Actor	Morgan Oey	Nominated	
