= Gowok: Javanese Kamasutra =

2025 drama film

- Poster
- Indonesian: Gowok: Kamasutra Jawa
- Directed by: Hanung Bramantyo
- Written by: Hanung Bramantyo; ZZ Mulja Salih
- Produced by: Raam Punjabi
- Starring: Raihaanun; Lola Amaria; Alika Jantinia; Devano Danendra; Reza Rahadian
- Cinematography: Satria Kurnianto
- Edited by: Haris F. Syah
- Music by: Krisna Purna
- Production companies: MVP Pictures; Dapur Films
- Release date: 2 February 2025 (Rotterdam)
- Running time: 130 minutes
- Country: Indonesia
- Languages: Indonesian; Javanese

Gowok: Javanese Kamasutra (Indonesian: Gowok: Kamasutra Jawa) is a 2025 drama film written and directed by Hanung Bramantyo. The film stars Raihaanun, Lola Amaria, Alika Jantinia, Devano Danendra, and Reza Rahadian.

The film had its world premiere at the 54th International Film Festival Rotterdam on 2 February 2025.

== Premise ==
The film follows gowok, a figure in Javanese tradition, referring to a woman who is hired to educate grooms about sexuality and the female body prior to marriage.

== Cast ==
- Raihaanun as Nya' Ratri
- Lola Amaria as Nya' Santi
- Alika Jantinia
- Devano Danendra
- Reza Rahadian
- Donny Damara
- Djenar Maesa Ayu
- Slamet Rahardjo Djarot

== Production ==
In July 2024, it was reported that Hanung Bramantyo would direct a film about a gowok set in the 1960s, with Raihaanun, Lola Amaria and Reza Rahadian set to star. It marks Amaria's first acting credit in eleven years. Principal photography took place in Sleman Regency, Yogyakarta.

== Release ==
Gowok: Javanese Kamasutra had its world premiere at the 54th International Film Festival Rotterdam on 2 February 2025, competing for the VPRO Big Screen Award. The film was selected at the 24th New York Asian Film Festival for its North American Premiere.

== Accolades ==
Award / Film Festival	Date of ceremony	Category	Recipient(s)	Result	Ref.
Festival Film Bandung	31 October 2025	Highly Commended Supporting Actress	Raihaanun	Won	
Festival Film Bandung	31 October 2025	Highly Commended Cinematography	Barmastya Bhumi Brawijaya and Satria Kurnianto	Nominated	
Festival Film Bandung	31 October 2025	Highly Commended Editing	Haris F. Syah and Wawan I. Wibowo	Nominated	
Indonesian Film Festival	20 November 2025	Best Actress	Lola Amaria	Nominated	
Indonesian Film Festival	20 November 2025	Best Supporting Actor	Reza Rahadian	Nominated	
Indonesian Film Festival	20 November 2025	Best Supporting Actress	Raihaanun	Nominated	
Indonesian Film Festival	20 November 2025	Best Original Screenplay	Hanung Bramantyo and ZZ Mulja Salih	Nominated	
Indonesian Film Festival	20 November 2025	Best Editing	Haris F. Syah and Wawan I. Wibowo	Nominated	
Indonesian Film Festival	20 November 2025	Best Costume Design	Hagai Pakan	Nominated	
Indonesian Film Festival	20 November 2025	Best Makeup	Fardillah Evariani	Nominated	
Film Pilihan Tempo	26 January 2026	Best Supporting Actress	Raihaanun	Nominated	
