= Home Sweet Loan =

2024 drama film

- Theatrical release poster
- Directed by: Sabrina Rochelle Kalangie
- Written by: Sabrina Rochelle Kalangie; Widya Arifianti
- Based on: Home Sweet Loan by Almira Bastari
- Produced by: Cristian Imanuell
- Starring: Yunita Siregar; Derby Romero; Risty Tagor; Fita Anggriani; Ayushita; Ariyo Wahab; Wafda Saifan
- Cinematography: Ivan Anwal Pane
- Edited by: Aline Jusria
- Production companies: Visinema Pictures; Legacy Pictures
- Release date: 26 September 2024
- Running time: 112 minutes
- Country: Indonesia
- Language: Indonesian

Home Sweet Loan is a 2024 drama film directed by Sabrina Rochelle Kalangie, and produced by Visinema Pictures and Legacy Pictures. It is written by Kalangie and Widya Arifianti based on the novel by Almira Bastari. The film stars Yunita Siregar, Derby Romero, Risty Tagor, Fita Anggriani, Ayushita, Ariyo Wahab, and Wafda Saifan. It was theatrically released in Indonesia on 26 September 2024.

== Premise ==
Kaluna, a middle-class worker who lives with her extended family, struggles to save up for her own house after her family faces financial difficulties.

== Cast ==
- Yunita Siregar as Kaluna
- Derby Romero as Danan
- Risty Tagor as Tanish
- Fita Anggriani as Miya
- Ayushita as Kamala
- Ariyo Wahab as Kanendra
- Wafda Saifan as Hansa
- Budi Ros as Kaluna's father
- Daisy Lantang as Kaluna's mother
- Akbarry Noor as Taswin

== Production ==
In August 2024, it was announced that Visinema Pictures had optioned the novel Home Sweet Loan by Almira Bastari. It marks Risty Tagor's acting return after her last appearance in Perempuan Berkalung Sorban in 2009.

== Release ==
Home Sweet Loan was released in Indonesian theatres on 26 September 2024. It exceeded one million admissions after eleven days of release. It garnered 1,720,271 admissions during its theatrical run.

Netflix acquired the film's worldwide distribution rights, releasing it on 30 January 2025.

== Accolades ==
Award / Film Festival	Date of ceremony	Category	Recipient(s)	Result	Ref.
Film Pilihan Tempo	5 February 2025	Best Supporting Actor	Budi Ros	Nominated	
Film Pilihan Tempo	5 February 2025	Best Supporting Actress	Ayushita	Won	
Festival Film Bandung	31 October 2025	Highly Commended Director	Sabrina Rochelle Kalangie	Nominated	
Festival Film Bandung	31 October 2025	Highly Commended Leading Actress	Yunita Siregar	Nominated	
Festival Film Bandung	31 October 2025	Highly Commended Editing	Aline Jusria	Nominated	
Anugerah Musik Indonesia	19 November 2025	Best Production Work for Visual Media	"Berakhir Di Aku" by Idgitaf	Nominated	
Indonesian Film Festival	20 November 2025	Best Adapted Screenplay	Widya Arifianti and Sabrina Rochelle Kalangie	Won	
Indonesian Film Festival	20 November 2025	Best Editing	Aline Jusria	Nominated	
Indonesian Film Festival	20 November 2025	Best Sound	Ridho Fachri and Indrasetno Vyatrantra	Won	
Indonesian Film Festival	20 November 2025	Best Theme Song	Brigita Meliala for "Berakhir di Aku"	Nominated	
Indonesian Movie Actors Awards	25 November 2025	Best Ensemble	Home Sweet Loan	Won	
Indonesian Movie Actors Awards	25 November 2025	Best Lead Actress	Yunita Siregar	Won	
Indonesian Movie Actors Awards	25 November 2025	Best Supporting Actor	Derby Romero	Nominated	
Indonesian Movie Actors Awards	25 November 2025	Best Supporting Actress	Ayushita	Nominated	
Indonesian Movie Actors Awards	25 November 2025	Best Newcomer	Fita Anggriani	Nominated	
