= Winter in Tokyo =

- Directed by: Fajar Bustomi
- Written by: Ilana Tan
- Produced by: Yoen K, Koki Kageyama, Yoichi Shimizu
- Starring: Pamela Bowie; Dion Wiyoko; Kimberly Ryder; Morgan Oey; Brandon Nicholas Salim; Ferry Salim; Brigitta Cynthia
- Cinematography: Nobuyasu Kita
- Music by: Junichi Matsumoto
- Production companies: Kadokawa Pictures, Emperor Motion Pictures, Unlimited Production, Maxima Pictures
- Distributed by: Maxima Pictures
- Release date: 11 August 2016
- Running time: 103 minutes
- Countries: Indonesia, Japan, Hong Kong
- Languages: Indonesian, Japanese

Winter in Tokyo(東京の冬) is a 2016 Indonesian romance drama film directed by Fajar Bustomi and adapted from one of four season tetralogy novels by Ilana Tan. Shooting location is on Japan. The film was released on 11 August 2016.

== Cast ==
- Pamela Bowie as Ishida Keiko
- Dion Wiyoko as Nishimura Kazuto
- Kimberly Ryder as Iwamoto Yuri
- Morgan Oey as Kitano Akira
- Ferry Salim as Shinzo
- Brandon Nicholas Salim as Tomoyuki Saito
- Brigitta Cynthia as Haruka Saito
- Russell Wong as Ishida Toru, retired farmer and Keiko's father
- Susan Bachtiar as Ishida Yoko, indonesian woman of chinese descent from Jakarta living in japan as jobs in Kyoto, Toru's wife and Keiko's mother
- Leonardo Nam as Maruyama Kenji
- Konatsu Tanaka
- Ritsuko Okusa
- Hiro Hayama
