= Sabrina Rochelle Kalangie =

Indonesian filmmaker (born 1992)

- Born: 1992 (age 33–34); Jakarta, Indonesia
- Occupations: Film director; screenwriter; graphic designer; actress
- Years active: 2016–present

Sabrina Rochelle Kalangie (born 1992) is an Indonesian film director, screenwriter, graphic designer, and actress. Her directorial debut, Too Handsome to Handle, was released in 2019. She won the Citra Award for Best Adapted Screenplay alongside Widya Arifianti at the 2025 Indonesian Film Festival for her work on the drama film Home Sweet Loan.

== Career ==
In 2014, Kalangie graduated from the BINUS University, majoring in visual communication design. Then, she worked as a graphic designer at Visinema Pictures, creating visual promotional materials for the company's films. She made her debut in the film industry as a make up artist for Angga Dwimas Sasongko's drama film Letters from Prague in 2016. Alongside Sasongko, she developed the web series, Arah and directed Filosofi Kopi the Series: Ben & Jody. He then offered Kalangie the opportunity to direct a film. In 2019, she made her directorial debut, Too Handsome to Handle, which was an adaptation of a Webtoon of the same name. For her work, she was nominated for Iqbal Rais Award for Best Directorial Debut at the 2019 Maya Awards, but lost to Gina S. Noer's Two Blue Stripes.

In 2021, she directed a short film Culas, which received a production grant under the Layar Indonesiana program from the Ministry of Education, Culture, Research, and Technology of Indonesia. In 2022, she directed her second feature film The Red Point of Marriage, based on the 1996 soap opera Noktah Merah Perkawinan. Kalangie, along with Titien Wattimena, received a nomination for the Best Adapted Screenplay at the 2022 Indonesian Film Festival. Under her direction, Oka Antara, Marsha Timothy, and Sheila Dara Aisha received Citra Award nominations for their performances in the film for Best Actor, Best Actress, and Best Supporting Actress, respectively. Culas also received a nomination for Best Live Action Short Film at the ceremony.

In August 2024, it was reported that Kalangie was attached to direct a drama film Home Sweet Loan, based on the novel of the same name by Almira Bastari. The film was released in Indonesian theatres on 26 September 2024 and garnered 1,720,271 admissions during its theatrical run. She won the Citra Award for Best Adapted Screenplay alongside Widya Arifianti at the 2025 Indonesian Film Festival for writing the film. In December 2025, it was announced that Kalangie would direct the Netflix original series Rapijali, an adaptation of Dee Lestari's novel of the same name.

== Filmography ==
=== Film ===
Year	Title	Director	Writer	Notes
2019	Too Handsome to Handle	Yes	Yes	
2021	Culas	Yes	No	Short film
2022	The Red Point of Marriage	Yes	Yes	
2024	Home Sweet Loan	Yes	Yes	

Acting roles

Year	Title	Role	Notes
2015	Filosofi Kopi	Reporter	
2016	Letters from Prague	Suster	Also as make-up artist
2016	Wonderful Life	Office staff	
2017	Bukaan 8	Sari	
2018	Love for Sale	Mira	
2019	Love for Sale 2	Mira	
2019	Eggnoid: Cinta & Portal Waktu	Girl	

=== Television ===
Year	Title	Director	Writer	Network	Notes
2017	Filosofi Kopi the Series: Ben & Jody	Yes	No	YouTube	5 episodes
2021	Awal & Akhir	Yes	No	Bioskop Online	5 episodes
2024	90 Hari Mencari Suami	Yes	No	Prime Video	10 episodes
