= Me Before Me =

2026 film by Gina S. Noer

- Indonesian: Aku Sebelum Aku
- Directed by: Gina S. Noer
- Written by: Gina S. Noer
- Produced by: Sigit Pratama; Anna Melani
- Starring: Bima Sena; Ringgo Agus Rahman
- Cinematography: Deska Binarso
- Edited by: Aji Pradityo
- Music by: Abel Huray
- Production company: Wahana Kreator
- Release date: 16 July 2026 (Netflix)
- Running time: 127 minutes
- Country: Indonesia
- Languages: Indonesian; Sundanese

Me Before Me (Indonesian: Aku Sebelum Aku) is a 2026 Indonesian coming-of-age drama film directed and written by Gina S. Noer. It stars Bima Sena as Jati, a bright student. It also stars Ringgo Agus Rahman, Widuri Puteri, Prastiwi Dwiarti, and Ronal Surapradja in supporting roles.

The film was released on Netflix on 16 July 2026.

== Premise ==
A bright middle school student with a demanding father uncovers a long-hidden family secret while working on his final project.

== Cast ==
- Bima Sena as Jati, a bright middle school student
- Ringgo Agus Rahman as Jaya, Jati's father
- Widuri Puteri as Asa, Jati's friend
- Prastiwi Dwiarti as Asih, Jati's mother
- Aming as Juned / Zai, Jati's teachers
- Ronal Surapradja as Geni, Jaya's brother

== Production ==
At a press conference, director and writer Gina S. Noer stated that the film aims to explore the impact of colonialism on transgenerational trauma. In February 2026, the film was announced as part of Netflix's Southeast Asian slate.

Principal photography took place in Bandung, Indonesia.

== Release ==
Me Before Me was released on Netflix on 16 July 2026.
