= The Siege at Thorn High =

Indonesian action thriller film

- Indonesian theatrical release poster
- Directed by: Joko Anwar
- Written by: Joko Anwar
- Produced by: Joko Anwar; Tia Hasibuan
- Starring: Morgan Oey; Omara Esteghlal; Hana Malasan
- Cinematography: Ical Tanjung
- Edited by: Joko Anwar; Erwin Prasetya Kurniawan; Teguh Raharjo
- Music by: Aghi Narottama
- Production companies: Come and See Pictures
- Distributed by: Amazon MGM Studios
- Release date: 17 April 2025 (Indonesia)
- Running time: 118 minutes
- Countries: Indonesia; United States
- Language: Indonesian

The Siege at Thorn High (Indonesian: Pengepungan Di Bukit Duri) is a 2025 Indonesian dystopian action thriller film written and directed by Joko Anwar, co-produced by Amazon MGM Studios and starring Morgan Oey, it follows Edwin, a substitute teacher assigned to teach at Duri Senior High School, an institution notorious for its troubled students.

The film was released by Amazon MGM Studios on 17 April 2025. It received the most nominations at the 2025 Indonesian Film Festival, alongside The Shadow Strays, with twelve each.

== Plot ==
The film opens with the May 1998 racial riots in Jakarta, during which ethnic Chinese communities are violently targeted amid economic turmoil. In 2009, high school student Silvi is abducted and raped during renewed unrest while traveling home with her younger brother Edwin, who is beaten unconscious. When he awakens, he finds their house burning. Silvi later raises Edwin alone before her death, entrusting him with finding the child conceived from the assault.

By 2027, Indonesia remains unstable, with anti-Chinese discrimination still widespread. Edwin, now a substitute teacher, accepts a position at the notoriously unruly Bukit Duri Senior High School while quietly searching for his nephew. He faces hostility from students, particularly Jefri, who leads a group known for targeting ethnic Chinese classmates. After Edwin intervenes to stop an attack on a student named Kristo, tensions escalate, and Jefri later assaults him. The school expels Jefri. During Independence Day preparations, large-scale riots erupt again across Jakarta. Exploiting the chaos, Jefri and his gang storm the school armed with weapons. Edwin, staff member Diana, Kristo, and another student, Rangga, barricade themselves inside the auditorium. When Rangga’s father arrives to retrieve his son, he is captured and brutally murdered, and Rangga is killed while attempting to escape.

Edwin reveals to Diana that his true reason for teaching at the school is to locate Silvi’s child. As violence spreads through the building, he attempts to disable the school’s signal jammer while gang members continue their attacks. Kristo later confirms he is not Edwin’s nephew. Edwin ultimately confronts Jefri, and after a struggle, Jefri is abandoned by his associates and killed as the situation spirals out of control. A mob soon overruns and loots the school. Before escaping, Edwin watches a video from Kristo revealing that Jefri’s hatred of ethnic Chinese people stemmed from the fact that he himself was born from a rape seventeen years earlier. Edwin narrowly flees the approaching crowd in a car driven by Panca, while elsewhere a captive previously held by Jefri’s gang is discovered and freed.

== Cast ==
- Morgan Oey as Edwin, a Chinese-Indonesian high school teacher
  - Millo Taslim as teenager Edwin
- Omara Esteghlal as Jefri Hariman
- Hana Malasan as Valdiana "Diana" Rahardjo
- Endy Arfian as Khristo Ramli
- Fatih Unru as Rangga Kurnia
- Satine Zaneta as Dorothy "Dotty" Susatyo
- Dewa Dayana as Gerry Rahadi
- Florian Rutters as Simala Arka
- Faris Fadjar Munggaran as Reihan Wahyudi
- Sandy Pradana as Hananto Setiawan
- Farandika as Jay Adiguna
- Raihan Khan as Robin "Culap" Oliando
- Lia Lukman as Silvi, Edwin's sister
  - Sheila Kusnadi as teenager Silvi
- Landung Simatupang as Darmo Sumitra
- Kiki Narendra as Abduh
- Emir Mahira as Panca
  - Bima Azriel as teenager Panca

== Production ==
The film was first announced in July 2022 and is produced by Amazon MGM Studios and Joko Anwar's Come and See Pictures, with Anwar attached to direct and Tia Hasibuan to produce. It was initially announced as an Amazon Prime Video original film. It is Anwar’s first non-horror film since 2019 and is his first collaboration with an American studio and a first collaboration with lead actor Morgan Oey. Omara Esteghlal and Hana Malasan also were set to lead the cast which includes Fatih Unru, Satine Zaneta, Dewa Dayana, Florian Rutters, Faris Fadjar Munggaran, Sandy Pradana, Raihan Khan, Sheila Kusnadi, Millo Taslim, Bima Azriel and Farandika. Principal photography had wrapped in October 2024.

== Release ==
The film was theatrically released in Indonesia on 17 April 2025. It exceeded a million admissions on its tenth day of release.

== Reception ==
Pengepungan di Bukit Duri received generally thoughtful commentary from Indonesian media, particularly for its social themes and historical context. Cinemags noted the film’s gripping prologue, which evokes the traumatic events of the May 1998 riots in Indonesia. The publication highlighted how the film reflects lingering anti-Chinese sentiment within society and explores its impact on daily life. Republika similarly emphasized the film’s focus on Indonesia's ongoing social crises, particularly violence and discrimination. The outlet pointed out the film’s implicit references to the 1998 riots, portraying the Chinese–Indonesian community as a vulnerable minority subject to systemic prejudice.

During a press conference, co-writer Tia stated that setting the film in 2027 was a deliberate choice, intended as a warning. "It’s meant to be urgent, because 2027 is not far away," she said. "History can repeat itself if we fail to be cautious, if we don’t reflect, talk about, or attempt to heal the trauma of our nation’s past." Director Joko Anwar revealed that the screenplay was originally completed in 2008 but was intentionally postponed in the hope that Indonesia's social climate would improve. By 2024, however, both he and Tia felt that the country had not changed significantly, prompting them to proceed with the film. “Seventeen years after we wrote the script, Indonesia still struggles with the same issues,” Joko remarked.
