= Cecep Arif Rahman =

Indonesian martial artist and actor (born 1972)

- Born: 18 August 1972 (age 53); Garut, West Java, Indonesia
- Occupations: Martial artist; Celebrity; Athlete
- Years active: 2001–present
- Children: 3

Cecep Arif Rahman (born 18 August 1972) is an Indonesian martial artist and actor. He is a martial art practitioner from the Silat Panglipur school. His career in pencak silat brought him to the Bercy Festival des Arts Martiaux in France from 2005 to 2008. His early acting career began with the movie The Raid 2.

== Early life ==
Cecep Arif Rahman grew up in the area near Mount Galunggung, Garut. Inspired by his grandfather, who was a silat figure, he started learning silat at Panglipur Galih school in Garut in 1986. He started teaching silat in 1991 after completing his teacher education. He went to Bandung to learn silat from R. Enni Rukmini Sekarningrat. While in Bandung, he also got acquainted with several other silat teachers.

Cecep Arif Rahman won the first place trophy in an international pencak silat championship in Thailand in the mid 1990s. He regularly attended the Bercy martial arts festival in Paris and was often invited to conduct silat workshops in France, Italy, England, Netherlands, and the USA.

In 2001, Cecep Arif Rahman began working as a teacher. He taught English at SD Tegalpanjang 3, Tegalpanjang, Sucinaraja, Garut and managed school administration.

== Film career ==
Cecep Arif Rahman became acquainted with Iko Uwais and Yayan Ruhian at the Bercy festival in 2006. In 2008, Cecep Arif Rahman was contacted by the two of them to assist in the making of his first film Merantau but at that time he had just been appointed a civil servant and turned it down.

Cecep Arif Rahman was again contacted by Iko to take part in the film The Raid 2 in 2013 because the film needed an actor experienced with the karambit. His role as "The Assassin" in The Raid 2 led him to star in other films, such as the Indonesian movie 3: Alif Lam Mim, as a martial arts teacher and also a fight choreograph. In 2015, Cecep Arif Rahman, Yayan Ruhian and Iko Uwais were also involved in starring in Star Wars: The Force Awakens.

In 2019, he appeared in John Wick: Chapter 3 – Parabellum as Shinobi #1, one of Zero's students, alongside Yayan Ruhian as Shinobi.

== Filmography ==
=== Film ===
Year	Title	Role	Notes
2014	The Raid 2	The Assassin	
2015	3: Alif Lam Mim	Asarot	Also as a fight choreograph
2015	Skakmat	Tanah Tinggi's boss	
2015	Star Wars: The Force Awakens	Crokind Shand	Cameo, Hollywood debut film
2016	Iseng	John	
2016	Juara	Kobar	
2016	The Gate	Rafael	Short film, also as a fight choreograph
2016	O: The Organization	Cecep	Short film
2018	212 Warrior	Bagaspati	
2019	John Wick: Chapter 3 – Parabellum	Shinobi #1	
2019	Gundala	Swara Batin	Also as a fight choreograph
2019	KL Vampires	Rudi Hikayat	Malaysian film
2021	Vengeance Is Mine, All Others Pay Cash	Ki Jempes	
2022	Satria Dewa: Gatotkaca	Pandega	
2022	Mendarat Darurat	Rascal	
2022	Qodrat	Kyai Rochim	Also as a martial arts coordinator
2023	Pemukiman Setan	—N/a	Also as martial arts choreograph
2025	Qodrat 2	Kyai Rochim	Also as martial arts choreograph
2025	The Tiger		
2026	Badut Gendong	—N/a	Also as a martial arts choreograph
TBA	23 Seconds	Irwan	Post-production

=== Television series ===
Year	Title	Role	Channel	Notes
2019	Strike Back: Revolution	Jericho	Cinemax	1 episode
