= The Shadow Strays =

- Directed by: Timo Tjahjanto
- Written by: Timo Tjahjanto
- Produced by: Timo Tjahjanto; Wicky V. Olindo; Anne P. Ralie
- Starring: Aurora Ribero; Hana Malasan; Taskya Namya; Agra Piliang; Andri Mashadi; Chew Kin Wah
- Cinematography: Batara Goempar
- Edited by: Dinda Amanda
- Music by: Fajar Yuskemal
- Production companies: Frontier Pictures; XYZ Films
- Distributed by: Netflix
- Release dates: 10 September 2024 (Toronto); 17 October 2024
- Running time: 145 minutes
- Country: Indonesia
- Languages: Indonesian; English; Japanese

The Shadow Strays is a 2024 Indonesian action crime thriller film written and directed by Timo Tjahjanto. Netflix released it on 17 October 2024. The film stars Aurora Ribero as Codename 13, a 17-year-old assassin suspended after a botched mission in Japan. During this time, she crosses paths with 11-year-old Monji, who has just lost his mother.

The film had its world premiere on 10 September 2024 at the 2024 Toronto International Film Festival. It received the most nominations at the 2025 Indonesian Film Festival, alongside The Siege at Thorn High, with twelve each.

== Plot ==
Code name 13, a 17-year-old assassin known as a Shadow, works for an international killing organization. During a mission in Japan, she successfully assassinates a crime leader but is suspended for psychological retraining after being subdued by her target's bodyguard. Her mentor, Umbra, is assigned a separate mission in Cambodia. While awaiting further orders in Jakarta, 13 resides near her neighbors Monji and Mirasti, an escort connected to trafficker Haga. After Mirasti is found dead from an overdose, 13 befriends Monji, who later disappears. 13 investigates and learns that Haga, his twin sister Soria, corrupt detective Prasetyo, and political candidate Ariel operate a criminal syndicate. She kills Haga and escapes the Moonrose club, drawing the group’s attention.

Meanwhile, Umbra discovers during her mission that their targets are fellow Shadows and hesitates to kill a pregnant operative, Volver, who is later executed by another assassin, Troika. As the syndicate hunts 13, she rescues Monji but is captured at Ariel’s mansion after killing Prasetyo. Soemitro, Ariel’s crime-boss father, spares her in order to use her as protection during a drug deal with Abi Kabil. During the exchange, Monji dies from his injuries, triggering a large shootout that leaves Soemitro, Kabul, and their forces dead. Amid the chaos, 13 kills Ariel, while Soria is killed by Haga’s former subordinate Jeki.

Umbra and Troika are then ordered to eliminate 13. After intercepting her, Troika is killed in pursuit, and 13 defeats Umbra. The latter grabs a knife to her throat, but refuses to execute her. When the Handler arrives and attempts to enforce the order, Umbra attacks him and is fatally shot. 13 kills the Handler, and Umbra reveals her real name—Nomi—before dying. Returning to Jakarta, Nomi buries Monji but is soon pursued by other Shadows led by her successor, 14. A masked man intervenes, killing two attackers and identifying himself as Master Buran, Umbra’s former mentor. He invites Nomi to become his apprentice, and she accepts, asking to be known by her true name.

== Cast ==
- Aurora Ribero as 13 / Nomi
- Hana Malasan as Umbra
- Taskya Namya as Soriah
- Agra Piliang as Haga
- Andri Mashadi as Ariel
- Chew Kin Wah as Handler
- Naomi Hitanayri Christy as Geisha
- Mawar Eva de Jongh as 14
- Adipati Dolken as Prasetyo
- Daniel Ekaputra as Troika
- Evy Fauziah as Ny. Sari Djamil
- Ali Fikri as Monji
- Banon Gautama as Kusno
- Tanta Ginting as Kabil
- Kristo Immanuel as Jeki
- Anty Indah as Heroin Girl
- Hiroaki Kato as Kenjiro
- Eva Celia as Volver
- Yayan Ruhian as Burai

== Production ==
In 2023, Netflix announced its Indonesian original slate, including The Shadow Strays. Tjahjanto previously directed a Netflix original film, The Big 4, a year prior. The production began in July 2023.

== Release ==
The Shadow Strays had its world premiere at the 2024 Toronto International Film Festival on 10 September 2024, during the Midnight Madness section.

Trailer for the film was released in September 2024 ahead of its release on Netflix worldwide on 17 October 2024.

== Reception ==
=== Audience viewership ===
In just six days after its release, The Shadow Strays charted in Netflix's Global Top 10 of non-English film and also ranked the Top 10 Films in 85 countries, including the United States, Canada, Brazil, France, the United Kingdom, Germany, Spain, Japan, South Korea, Hong Kong, and Indonesia.

=== Critical response ===
On the review aggregator website Rotten Tomatoes, 89% of 18 critics' reviews are positive, with an average rating of 7.1/10.

Patrick Brzeski of The Hollywood Reporter praised The Shadow Strays and described it as John Wick but said, "Make it Indonesian women with uzis and samurai swords — and more brutal." Johnny Loftus on New York Post's Decider commented that "Shadow Strays consists of extended bouts of firearm and fist and swordplay that result in so many satisfyingly gruesome kill shots" and acclaimed Ribero and Malasan's professional skill and personal bond that "establishes and eventually pierces the heart at the center of Shadow Strays" as well as recommended to watch the film. Maxance Vincent on Loud and Clear Reviews approved the film's intense action and violence choreography, describing it as "nonstop carnage" and "admittedly impressive to watch from a visual/aural perspective but is purposefully unenjoyable," and concluded that the film is "one of the best and most thrilling action movies of the year" with greatly distinctive choreography compared to other notable independent films in 2024.

David Ehrlich of IndieWire criticized the film's maximalist violence as "a graceless orgy of death and dismemberment that’s easier to appreciate for its spirit than it is to enjoy for its execution(s)" and Timo's vision for the "muchness" nuance of his film as a "double-edged sword." Chris Evangelista wrote for /Film and overall gave a balanced evaluation of the film as "exciting and exhausting." He praised Timo's delivery of the action and the cinematography as "superb style" and "everything looks extra cool," commented that "The Shadow Strays is a movie designed to be cool," and acknowledged the violence's true artistry as he "particularly loved how filthy and bloody the characters get as they engage in scuffles." However, he pointed out that the violence aspect of the film is "so constant and unyielding" that it made him "grow less enamored with the frequent bloody action and a little more weary" as the film progresses.

On December 6, 2024, it was named the #1 Martial Arts Film of 2024 by the editors of Taekwondo Life Magazine
