= Qodrat =

2022 Indonesian horror film

- Theatrical release poster
- Directed by: Charles Gozali
- Written by: Gea Rexy; Asaf Antariksa; Charles Gozali
- Produced by: Linda Gozali Arya
- Starring: Vino G. Bastian; Marsha Timothy; Randy Pangalila
- Production companies: Magma Entertainment; Rapi Films; Ideosource Entertainment; Astro Shaw; Caravan Studio; Dunia Mencekam Productions
- Distributed by: Rapi Films (Indonesia); Prime Video (worldwide)
- Release dates: October 27, 2022 (Indonesia); November 24, 2022 (Malaysia)
- Running time: 102 minutes
- Country: Indonesia
- Language: Indonesian
- Box office: US$5.3 million

Qodrat is a 2022 Indonesian supernatural religious action horror film directed by Charles Gozali. The film stars Vino G. Bastian, and Marsha Timothy. It was released in Indonesia on 27 October 2022 by Rapi Films, and then for worldwide audience on Amazon Prime Video on 15 March 2023. A direct sequel, Qodrat 2, was released on 31 March 2025.

== Plot ==
Ustad Qodrat, a veteran exorcist, fails to exorcise his son, Alif Al-Fatanah, who is possessed and killed by a demon named As'-Su' A'la. Sentenced to three years of imprisonment for gross negligence, Qodrats grows greatly depressed. In prison, Qodrat is killed by As'-Su' A'la after he is invited by his prolonged grieving. However, he is brought back to life after a transit to Barzakh (purgatory) where he realizes his mistakes. Looking for answers to his worries, Qodrat returns to the boarding school in the village he studied, which has become rampant with unexplained disturbances. Jihan, a girl, is possessed by an unknown demon who forces her to commit suicide. Villagers are running out of resources due to their crops failing in the last three years. They resort to jampi (Javanese spells) to deal with the disturbances, to no avail.

Alif Amri, a boy, is possessed by a demon which attacks his mother Yasmin and sister Asha. Qodrat is faced with the trauma of having to exorcise his son's namesake. During the exorcism, Qodrat learns that the demon is Khodab, As'-Su' A'la's minion who threatens Qodrat to call his master. Qodrat has to choose between obeying his anger or re-finding his faith. A man named Jafar takes Yasmin's family after As'-Su' A'la attacks them. Qodrat later learns that the boarding school deprived the villagers' land rights, as Jafar took them away on behalf of the school for payment of his service. Jihan's family's land had also been claimed by Jafar, resulting in him being unemployed. Enraged, he vents his anger to Qodrat and beats him mercilessly. He stops when they witness Tanti, Jihan's mother, commit suicide by jumping from the cliff in front of them.

Alif recovers, however he recites a jampi in lieu of a basmala when praying. Yasmin is then possessed by As'-Su' A'la, who wreaks havoc in her house. Asha seeks help at the school, leaving Alif with Yasmin. Qodrat eventually learns from Kyai Rochim that it is Jafar who caused the disturbances. Jafar summoned various demons, including As'-Su' A'la, to gain power from the village, and that he is a black kejawèn dukun (shaman of a folk Javenese religion) disguised an ustad. Qodrat kills him, then fights As'-Su' A'la who is then expelled from Yasmin, only to possess Alif Amri. As'-Su' A'la casts a spell to morph the appearance of Alif into Alif Al-Fatanah to deceive Qodrat. After breaking its spell, Qodrat is finally able to expel it from Alif. Six months later, the village regains prosperity. Qodrat then leaves the village; while driving, he sees thunder from afar. Taking this as a sign, he speeds up towards the thunder.

== Cast ==
- Vino Bastian as Qodrat
- Jason Doulez Beunaya Bangun as Alif Al-Fatanah/As'-Su' A'la
- Pritt Timothy as the old prisoner
- Whani Darmawan as the possessed warden
- Marsha Timothy as Yasmin
- Maudy Effrosina as Asha
- Keanu Azka as Alif Amri/Khodab/As'-Su' A'la
- Rezca Syam as Ilham Amri
- Randy Pangalila as Jafar
- Cecep Arif Rahman as Kyai Rochim
- Adelheid Bunga as Jihan/unnamed demon
- Agla Artalidia as Tanti
- Eduward Manalu as Tanti's husband
- Ricky Saldan as Kobar

== Production ==
The filming was done at Pengilon Hills at Gunung Kidul and Kaliurang Hills at Kaliurang, Sleman. Both located at Yogyakarta. The filming took place for 4 months.

Qodrat is the first debut of Vino Bastian role in a horror film. Not only that, but this movie was also for the first time Vino Bastian played in the same film with his wife, Marsha Timothy. Coincidentally, the film was released exactly on their 10th wedding anniversary.

Due to extensive Islamic religious actions and messages delivered by the film, in order to keep the messages value in line with Islam, the screenwriters deeply researched Islamic demonology and arts of ruqyah during the script development. The production team also consulted Nahdhlatul Ulama socio-religious scientist Dr. Ngatawi Al-Zastrouw and professional raqi from Indonesia Ruqya House Ustad Isman during the production. Both ustads reviewed every script and acts taken by the performers, so their acts are real and in line with both Islamic values and Javanese culture.

Randy Pangalila revealed that the spell recitation used by his role, Ustad Jafar, to summon the demons was actual and original spell used to worship demons used by the real-life Javanese dukun santet (dukun which capable to deal pain or even death by curse). He said that the spell he recited is initial part of dedication to demons which supposed to summon demons for come to assist in santet act. However, as the production is supervised by professional raqis (ruqyah practitioner) which understand how the Javanese santet spells work, the supervising raqis advised that some parts of spell need to be recited improperly and recited without intention to really use, so the spell does not work upon recitation.

== Reception ==
=== Box office ===
On the 8th day of its release, Qodrat has gained more than 800,000 tickets sales, and surpassed one million viewers in just two weeks. As of 5 November 2022, it is one of the highest grossing local films of 2022, with 1.7 million admissions and an estimated gross Rp60 billion ($5.3 million).

== Accolades ==
Award / Film Festival	Date of ceremony	Category	Recipient(s)	Result	Ref.
Indonesian Film Festival	14 November 2023	Best Visual Effects	Gaga Nugraha Ramadhan	Nominated	
Indonesian Film Festival	14 November 2023	Best Sound	Aria Prayogi, Ridho Fachri, M. Ichsan Rachmaditta	Nominated	
Indonesian Film Festival	14 November 2023	Best Film Editing	Teguh Raharjo	Nominated	

== See also ==
- Indonesian horror
- Spirit possession and exorcism in Islam
