= Morgan Oey =

Indonesian actor and singer (born 1990)

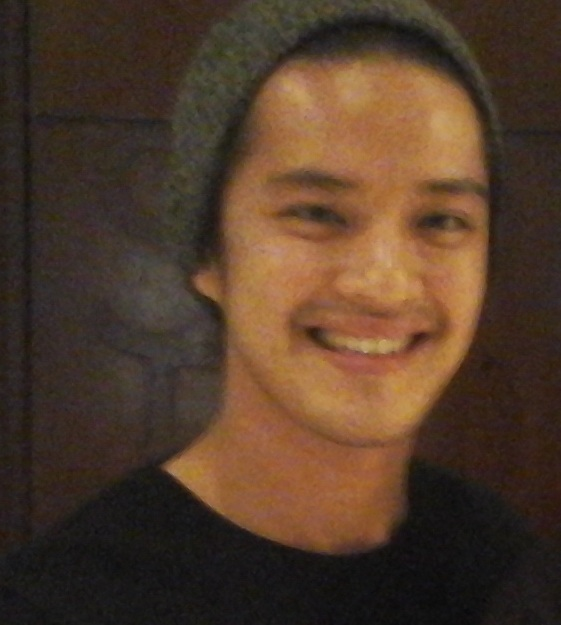

Background information
- Also known as: Morgan Oey
- Born: Handi Morgan Winata; 25 May 1990 (age 36); Singkawang, West Kalimantan, Indonesia
- Genres: Pop; R&B; Soul
- Occupations: Actor model singer
- Years active: 2010–present

Handi Morgan Winata, colloquially known as Morgan Oey (born 25 May 1990), is an Indonesian actor, model and singer of mixed Dayak and Chinese descent. He was a member of the pop group SM*SH from 2010 to 2013.

== Discography ==
=== As SM*SH Member ===
- SM*SH (2011)
- Step Forward (2012)

== Filmography ==
=== Film ===
Year	Title	Role
2014	Assalamualaikum Beijing	Zhongwen
2015	Air Mata Surga (Heaven of Tears)	Hamzah
2015	Ngenest	Patrick
2016	Dreams	Rama
2016	Jilbab Traveler: Love Sparks in Korea	Hyun Geun
2016	Winter in Tokyo	Akira Kitano
2016	Melbourne Rewind	Max
2017	Mooncake Story	David
2017	Sweet 20	Alan
2018	Arini	Nick
2018	Koki-Koki Cilik (Junior Chefs)	Chef Rama
2018	Belok Kanan Barcelona (Turn Right Barcelona)	Francis Lim
2018	Generasi Micin	Trisno Anggara
2018	The Night Comes for Us	Arian's Assistant
2018	Love is a Bird	Remi
2019	My Stupid Boss 2	Nguyen
2019	Mahasiswi Baru (New Student)	Danny
2019	Eggnoid	Eggy
2021	Ibu	Morgan
2021	Terlambat Pergi	Derek
2021	Will	Morgan
2021	Tali Mati (Death Knot)	Mario
2022	Mertua Vs. Menantu	Menantu
2022	Srimulat: Hil yang Mustahal	Paul
2022	Teka Teki Tika	Andre
2022	Cek Toko Sebelah	Asui
2023	Puisi Cinta Yang Membunuh	Rendy
2023	Romeo Ingkar Janji	Romeo
2023	Sleep Call	Artist
2023	Because I Hate Korea	Morgan
2025	The Siege at Thorn High	Edwin
2025	Siapa Dia	Samo
2025	Lost in the Spotlight	Morgan Woo
2026	Ghost in The Cell	Bimo

=== Television Drama ===
Year	Title	Role
2011	Cinta Cenat Cenut (TV Series)	Morgan Rusdiantoro
2011–2012	Cinta Cenat Cenut 2 (TV Series)	Morgan Rusdiantoro
2012	Cinta Cenat Cenut 3 (TV Series)	Morgan Rusdiantoro
2012	Putih Abu-Abu (White and Grey)	Morgan Oey (special appearance)
2013	Surat Kecil Untuk Tuhan: The Series (Sinetron)	Dokter Morgan
2013	My Lovely Brother (TVM)	Lorie
2013	Merpati Tak Pernah Ingkar Janji (TVM)	Guntur
2014	Kau Yang Berasal Dari Bintang (Sinetron)	Profesor Morgan
2015	Lagu Rindu untuk Airin (TVM)	Tristan
2016	Selamanya Cinta (Forever Love) (TVM)	Gio
2017	SWITCH (VIU)	Richard
2019	Cek Toko Sebelah Series 2 (HOOQ)	Asui
2022	Mendua	Gerry

=== Music Video Appearances ===
Year	Title	Role					
2010	Sepasang Hati	Salute Band	2024	Rahasia #1	RAN	2024	Rahasia #2

== Awards and nominations ==
Year	Award	Category	Nominated work	Result
2015	4th Maya Awards	Best New Actor	Assalamualaikum Beijing	Won
2016	1st Indonesian Box Office Movie Awards	Best Supporting Actor	Air Mata Surga	Nominated
2016	1st Indonesian Box Office Movie Awards	Best Supporting Actor	Ngenest	Nominated
2017	30th Bandung Film Festival	Best Film Actor	MoonCake Story	Nominated
2018	31st Bandung Film Festival	Best Film Supporting Actor	Koki-Koki Cilik	Won
2019	13th Indonesian Movie Actors Awards	Best Supporting Actor	Koki-Koki Cilik	Nominated
2019	13th Indonesian Movie Actors Awards	Favorite Supporting Actor	Koki-Koki Cilik	Won
