= Freya Jayawardana =

Indonesian singer (born 2006)

Raden Rara Freya Jayawardana
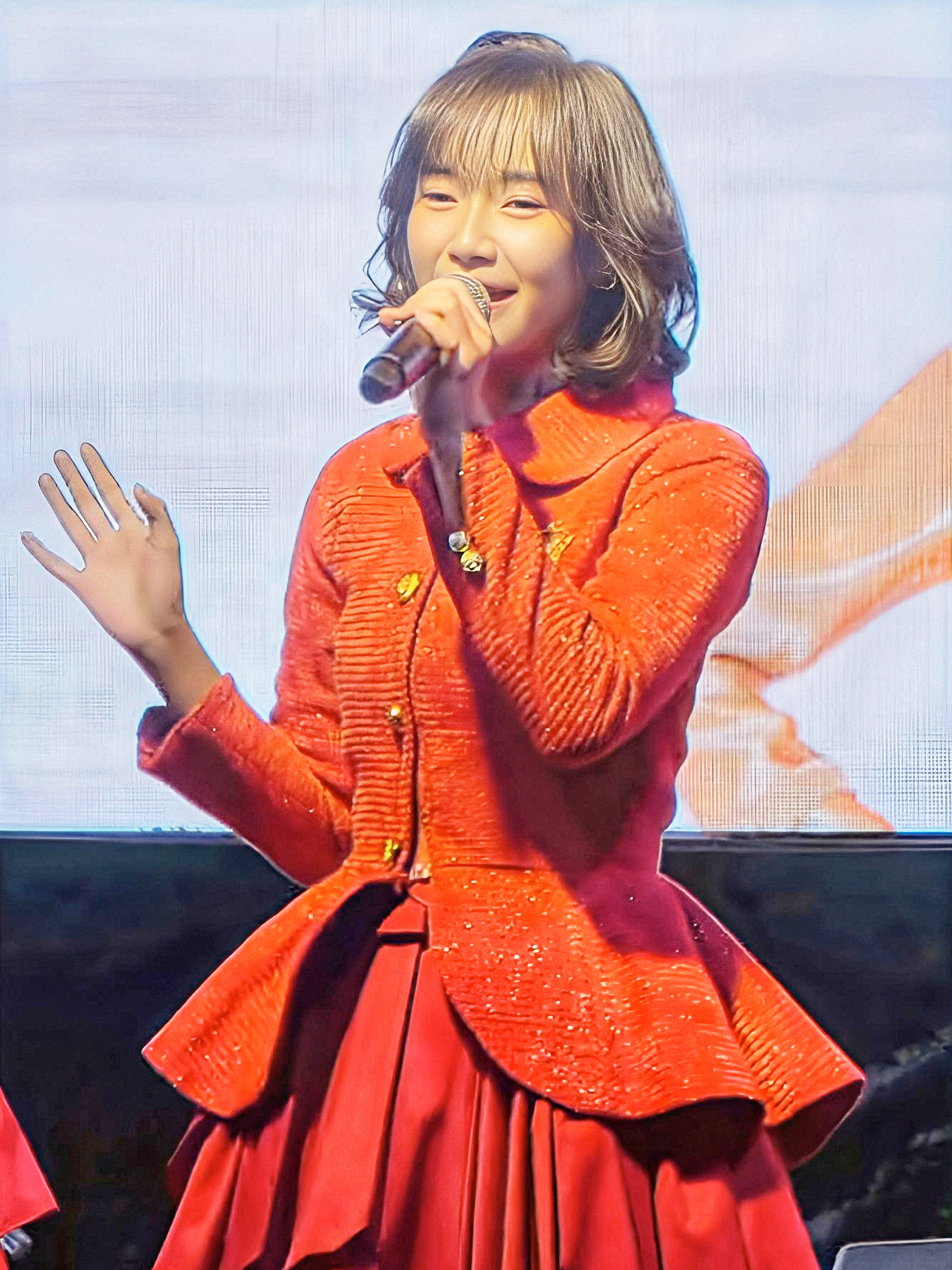
- Freya Jayawardana in August 2023
- Born: Freyanashifa Jayawardana; February 13, 2006 (age 20); Tangerang, Banten, Indonesia
- Other name: フレヤ (Fureya)
- Occupations: Singer; Dancer; Celebrity; Internet personality
- Years active: 2018–present
- House: Mataram Hamengkubuwono
- Musical career
- Genres: Pop; J-pop
- Instrument: Vocal
- Labels: HITS (former label); dentsuX (former agency); Indonesia Musik Nusantara
- Members: JKT48 (2018–present)
- Website: http://www.jkt48.com/

Freya Jayawardana (born February 13, 2006 as Freyanashifa Jayawardana and also known mononymously as Freya), is an Indonesian singer, dancer, and actress. Jayawardana is a descendant of Sultan Hamengkubuwana II and thus holds the noble title of Raden Rara, given to female descendants of any Sultans of Yogyakarta who remain unmarried from fifth grade onwards.

She is the incumbent captain of the seventh generation of the JKT48 idol girl group, introduced in 2018.

== Early life ==
Jayawardana was born in Tangerang, Banten on February 13, 2006 and has two younger brothers. She spent her childhood in Samarinda before moving to Jakarta.

During her childhood, Jayawardana developed an early interest in dancing and singing, particularly admiring Barbie and Girls' Generation.

== Career ==
=== Debut in JKT48 and early career (2018 – 2022) ===
After graduating from elementary school, Jayawardana moved to Jakarta and immediately auditioned for the seventh generation of JKT48 in 2018. She was accepted into the group at the age of 12 and officially started as a trainee member in Academy Class B on September 29, 2018. However, on October 25, 2018 she failed the initial stage of the Academy Class B exam. Despite this setback she continued to progress and was promoted to Academy Class A on December 18, 2018. Although she did not qualify in the 5th JKT48 Senbatsu Sousenkyo in 2018, she made a subsequent attempt in the 6th JKT48 Senbatsu Sousenkyo in 2019, but did not rank within the top 32.

Jayawardana first came into the spotlight when she went viral on Twitter in 2020, and then joined JKT48's Team T. on June 2 of that same year, marking a significant step in her career. On March 12, 2021 she became an official member of JKT48's seventh generation and was transferred into the JKT48 New Formation. That year she also contributed to the production of the short film project Film Pendek Profil Pelajar Pancasila (The Short Film about Profile of Pancasila Students), a collaboration between JKT48 and the Ministry of Education, Culture, Research and Technology of the Republic of Indonesia.

In September 2022 Jayawardana was selected as a representative member of JKT48. As part of her role, she was invited to deliver a speech at the Indonesia Millennial and Gen-Z Summit 2022 held in Jakarta.

=== Breakthrough and rise to prominence (2023 – present) ===
Jayawardana became a viral meme sensation on the internet in 2023, and on July 19 appeared as a special guest on the Trans7 variety show Lapor Pak!, which subsequently became a trending topic on Twitter. In August 2023 she represented JKT48 at the 2023 Tokyo Idol Festival, and conducted an official visit to the AKB48 Theater. Later that same month she represented JKT48 at the 2023 AniManGaki. In October 2023 she was the first member of JKT48 to successfully perform all unit songs from the Renai Kinshi Jourei setlist, solidifying her position.

In early 2024 Jayawardana made her feature film debut in the horror movie, Kuasa Gelap, released in English as Dominion of Darkness. In April 2024 she contributed her voice to the JKT48 Voice Pack as part of the Free Fire X JKT48 collaboration. On May 8, 2024 she attended the premiere of JKT48's short film Magic Hour, in which she acted, an event that also celebrated the release of the original single of the same title, on which she sang. In late May 2024 she was selected to represent JKT48 in the 2024 AKB48 6th Group Singing Competition, along with seven other members. In mid-2024 Jayawardana was cast in the series adaptation of the novel Dia Angkasa as Vana, and was also set to participate in the film adaptation of the drama series 1 Kakak 7 Ponakan.

In July 2024 the group's official website confirmed her participation as a representative of JKT48 at the 2024 AKB48 Group LIVE in Kuala Lumpur. In early August 2024 she took part in Melodi Kemerdekaan 2024, a state ceremonial event organized in collaboration with the Ministry of Tourism and Creative Economy to commemorate the 79th anniversary of the independence of the Republic of Indonesia. In October 2024 Jayawardana appeared on the 2025 Jakarta Fashion Week (JFW) stage.

In December 2024, Jayawardana appeared in the documentary 13 Tahun JKT48: Kisah Tumbuhnya Para Idola (13 Years of JKT48: The Growth Tale of Idols), hosted by Najwa Shihab and featuring members, management, and fans. During the same month she achieved sixth position in the 7th JKT48 Senbatsu Sousenkyo with 77,328 votes, placing her among the members of the Senbatsu lineup. As a result she appeared in the group's 26th single, "#KuSangatSuka", released in early February 2025, also being selected as the Global Center for the Te wo Tsunaginagara setlist.

On 20 December 2025, in JKT48's 14th anniversary concert at ICE BSD, Tangerang Regency, Banten, Jayawardana was named as the next JKT48 Captain and promoted from Regular Member to the Team Dream, starting at the end of March 2026.

== Artistry ==
Jayawardana has shown ability from the outset in both dancing and singing and is known for her discipline in training, leading to her rapid development within the group's lineup. She gained more popularity – notably on TikTok – following the viral spread of video memes from her live broadcasts on the SHOWROOM app. Her popularity also extends to fashion styles, video games, and e-commerce.

== Public image ==
Jayawardana was initially portrayed as having a childlike personality in her interactions with fellow seventh-generation members of JKT48, but she is also known for having good manners and a positive attitude. She is admired for her kindness and willingness to interact with fans, particularly those with disabilities, and as her career has progressed her personality has evolved into a more mature image. Her close friendships with fellow JKT48 member Fiony Alveria and others have been frequently highlighted in the media, with their relationships often portrayed as "best friends" in public appearances.

Her interests encompass a wide array of activities, including dancing, singing, photography, reading novels, and travelling. These activities offer escape from her demanding role as a girl idol and support her personal growth and development. She is also known for her fondness for 90s songs, and her relative unfamiliarity with current song trends. She has a fanbase among JKT48 fans known as Freyanation.

== Personal life ==
As a descendant of Sultan Hamengkubuwana II, Jayawardana holds the noble title of Raden Rara, which was added to her official identity when she turned seventeen. Her mother is of Minangkabau descent.

In early 2026 Jayawardana filed an official report with the South Jakarta Metropolitan Police reporting the existence of an anonymous social media account that had allegedly used and altered her photographs using artificial intelligence (AI). The report alleged electronic data manipulation and violations of Indonesia’s Electronic Information and Transactions Law related to the misuse of digital content, and as part of her complaint she submitted screenshots of the posts and information on accounts suspected of involvement.

Law enforcement authorities stated that the incidents were believed to have occurred between 2022 and 2025 and initiated an investigation. As the reporting party, Jayawardana was scheduled to provide further clarification, and additional witnesses were expected to be questioned.

== JKT48 Senbatsu Sousenkyo placements ==
Since her debut in 2018, Jayawardana has participated in several editions of the JKT48 Senbatsu Sousenkyo. A summary of her ranking placements follows:

Edition	Year	Final rank	Number of votes	Position on single	Single
5	2018	Not eligible	Not eligible	Not eligible	Not eligible
6	2019	Not ranked	Not ranked	Not ranked	Not ranked
7	2024	6	77,328	Second Row; Senbatsu lineup	#Sukinanda (#KuSangatSuka)

== Stage units ==
ACA1 (Pajama Drive)

- Tenshi no Shippo
- Kagami no Naka no Jean Da Arc
- Pajama Drive

J5 (Idol no Yoake)

- Tengoku no Yarou

T7 (Seifuku no Me)

- Onna no Ko no Dairokkan
- Mangekyou

ACA2 (Boku no Taiyou)

- Higurashi no Koi

T-W2 (Fly, Team T)

- Aozora Kataomoi
- Hatsukoi Dash

JKT1 (Renai Kinshi Jourei)

- Tsundere!
- Manatsu no Christmas Rose (Swap)
- Heart Gata Virus (Swap)
- Renai Kinshi Jourei (Swap)
- Kuroi Tenshi (Swap)

JKT2 (Seishun Girls)

- Ame no Doubutsuen
- Blue rose (Swap)
- Fushidara na Natsu

JKT3 (Seifuku no Me)

- Onna no Ko no Dairokkan
- Omoide Ijou (Swap)

JKT4 (Ramune no Nomikata)

- Nice to meet you!
- Finland Miracle (Swap)

JKTSS (Banzai JKT48)

- Oshibe to Meshibe to Yoru no Chouchou (Duet with Marsha Lenathea)
- Gomen ne, Jewel (3rd Unit)
- Hatsukoi yo, Konnichiwa (4th Unit) (Center)
- Candy (6th Unit)
- Glory Days (8th Unit)
- Rider (12th Unit) (Center)
- Nage Kiss de Uchi Otose! (13th Unit)

JKT48 10th Anniversary Special Setlist (Banzai JKT48)

- Nagiichi (Nagisa de Ichiban Kawaii Girl!!) (Gadis yang Paling Cantik Pinggir Pantai)
- Eien Pressure (Selamanya Pressure)
- Oshibe to Meshibe to Yoru no Chouchou (Benang Sari, Putik, dan Kupu-Kupu Malam)
- Gomen ne, Jewel (Maafkan, Hai Permataku)
- Teacher Teacher
- Kataomoi, Finally! (Cinta Tak Berbalas, Finally!)
- Must Be Now
- Sweet & Bitter
- Tsugi no Season (Musim yang Selanjutnya)
- Shoujo wa Manatsu ni Nani wo Suru? (Apa yang Sang Gadis Perbuat di Musim Panas?)
- Pareo wa Emerald (Pareo adalah Emerald)
- Banzai Venus

== Discography ==
=== Solo ===
Songs

- Day By Day (2023)

=== With JKT48 ===
Singles

- Darashinai Aishikata (Cara Ceroboh untuk Mencinta) (2021)
- Ponytail to Shushu (Ponytail dan Shu-shu) (version 2023) (2023)
- Magic Hour (2024)
- Seishun no Laptime (Laptime Masa Remaja) (version 2024) (2024)
- #Sukinanda (#KuSangatSuka) (2025)
- Oh My Pumpkin! (JKT48 version) (2025)
- Idol Nanka Janakattara (Andai 'Ku Bukan Idola) (2026)
- Warota People (Wakaka People) (2026)

Songs

- Kebun Binatang Saat Hujan (2023)
- Selamat Ulang Tahun (Shopee Indonesia) (2023)
- Ini Ramadan Kita (Nasida Ria x JKT48 bersama Google) (2024)
- Langit Biru Cinta Searah (2024)
- Cinta, Persahabatan, dan Perjuangan (2024)
- Happy & Pretty (Laleimanino x JKT48 bersama Scarlett) (2024)
- Beautiful Beast (Infinix Indonesia) (2024)
- Waktunya Membuktikan (2025)

Albums

- JOY KICK! TEARS (2019)
  - Bersama Kamu, Pelangi, dan Mentari
- This Is JKT48 New Era (2023)
  - 109 – Marukyuu (New Era Version)
  - Virgin Love (New Era Version)
  - Only Today (New Era Version)
  - Benang Sari, Putik, dan Kupu-Kupu Malam – Oshibe to Meshibe to Yoru no Chouchou (New Era Version)
- Mahagita Vol. 2 (2023)
  - Eureka Milik Kita
  - New Ship
  - Better
  - Mari Menjadi Pohon Sakura
  - Green Flash
  - Kita Tak Akan Biarkan Mimpi Itu Mati
  - Jiwaru Days

== Videography ==
=== Solo ===
Music Videos

- Day By Day (2023)

=== With JKT48 ===
Music Videos

- Darashinai Aishikata (Cara Ceroboh untuk Mencinta) (2021)
- AKB48 Group Asia Festival 2021 ONLINE – 109 (Marukyuu) & Virgin Love (2021)
- JKT48 New Era Special Performance Video – Only Today & Musim Panas yang Kacau (2021) (in the Only Today part)
- Berani Bersuara <3 <3 (2022)
- JKT48 New Era Special Performance Video - Benang Sari, Putik, dan Kupu-Kupu Malam (2023)
- Ponytail to Shushu (Ponytail dan Shu-shu) (version 2023) (2023)
- JKT48 New Era Special Performance Video - Kebun Binatang Saat Hujan (2023)
- Selamat Ulang Tahun (Shopee Indonesia) (2023)
- Ini Ramadan Kita (Nasida Ria x JKT48 bersama Google) (2024)
- JKT48 New Era Special Performance Video – Langit Biru Cinta Searah (2024)
- Magic Hour (2024)
- Free Fire X JKT48 – Cinta, Persahabatan, dan Perjuangan (2024)
- Seishun no Laptime (Laptime Masa Remaja) (version 2024) (2024)
- Happy & Pretty (Laleimanino x JKT48 bersama Scarlett) (2024)
- Beautiful Beast (Infinix Indonesia) (2024)
- #Sukinanda (#KuSangatSuka) (2025)
- Waktunya Membuktikan – Musikal Keluarga Cemara x JKT48 (2025)
- Oh My Pumpkin! (JKT48 version) (2025)
- Idol Nanka Janakattara (Andai 'Ku Bukan Idola) (2026)
- Warota People (Wakaka People) (2026)

== Appearances ==
=== Solo ===
Variety shows

- Lapor Pak! (July 19, 2023, Trans7)
- Bercanda Tapi Santai (September 16, 2023, Trans7)

Films/Movies

- Dominion of Darkness (2024)
- A Brother and 7 Siblings (2024)

Series

- Dia Angkasa (2024)

=== With JKT48 ===
Concerts

- JKT48 7th Anniversary Concert (2018)
- JKT48 8th Anniversary Concert (2019)
- JKT48 9th Anniversary Concert SOL/LUNA (2020)
- JKT48 10th Anniversary Kick-Off Conference (2021)
- JKT48 10th Anniversary Concert HEAVEN (2022)
- JKT48 11th Anniversary Concert FLYING High (2022)
- JKT48 Personal Meet & Greet Festival Nice to See You (2023)
- JKT48 Summer Festival (2023)
- JKT48 12th Anniversary Concert FLOWERFUL (2023)
- JKT48 Shani Graduation Concert Last Voyage (2024)
- JKT48 Personal Meet & Greet Festival Spring Has Come (2024)
- JKT48 Personal Meet & Greet Festival Road to Sousenkyo 2024 (2024)
- JKT48 13th Anniversary Concert WONDERLAND and the 7th JKT48 Senbatsu Sousenkyo (Final Result) (2024)
- JKT48 26th Single Personal Meet & Greet Festival (2025)
- JKT48 Special Concert FULL HOUSE – JKT48 & Friends on One Stage (2025)
- SISTER REUNION – JKT48 & AKB48 Personal Meet And Greet Festival (2025)
- THE FIRST SNOW – JKT48 14th Anniversary Concert & Gracia Graduation Ceremony (2025)

Tours

- JKT48 10th Anniversary Tour (2022)
- JKT48 Summer Tour 2023 (2023)

Variety shows

- Dream Box Indonesia (March 7, 2022, TRANSTV)
- Bercanda Pagi (March 10, 2022, Trans7)
- Dahsyatnya 2022 (October 2022, RCTI)
- SING ALONG (June 15, 2023, TRANSTV)
- MasterChef Indonesia (September 30, 2023, RCTI)
- Dream Box Indonesia (March 25, 2024, TRANSTV)

Others

- SCTV 31st Anniversary Xtraordinary (2021)
- SCTV 32nd Anniversary Xtraordinary (2022)
- Indonesia Millennial and Gen-Z Summit 2022 (2022)
- Jak-Japan Matsuri 2022 (2022)
- Konser Menuju Piala Dunia (2022)
- Indonesian Music Awards 2022 (2022)
- Free Fire Master League (FFML) Season 7 (2023)
- Perayaan 30 Tahun ANTV SPEKTA 3 DEKADE (2023)
- Tokyo Idol Festival 2023 (2023)
- AniManGaki 2023 (2023)
- Pesta Mabar Anniversary, Mobile Legends: Bang Bang (MLBB) (2023)
- Pesta Perayaan Pemuda di Monumen Nasional (2023)
- TV Show Shopee 12.12 Birthday Sale 2023 (2023)
- JKT48 Pertunjukan Teater Sementara di Surabaya & Yogyakarta (2024)
- The 6th AKB48 Group Singing Competition (2024)
- Melodi Kemerdekaan 2024 (2024)
- Amazing Kids Favorite Awards 2024 (2024)
- Peringatan HUT ke-79 Republik Indonesia di KBRI Kuala Lumpur (2024)
- AKB48 Group LIVE in KL 2024 (2024)
- AniManGaki 2024 (2024)
- JAM EXPO 2024 (2024)
- Soundsfest Experience (2025)
- Anime Festival Asia 2025 (2025)
- Amazing Kids Favorite Awards 2025 (2025)
- Pavilion World Expo Japan 2025 (2025)

Films/Movies

- Film Pendek Profil Pelajar Pancasila: Langit Tak Selamanya Abu-Abu (2021)
- Film Pendek Profil Pelajar Pancasila: Mentari Terbit dan Tenggelam Tanpa Membedakan Sisi Dunia (2021)
- Film Pendek Profil Pelajar Pancasila: Elang Tak Takut Terbang Sendiri (2021)
- JKT48 Magic Hour (2024)
- 13 Tahun JKT48: Kisah Tumbuhnya Para Idola (2024) (The short documentary of JKT48)

Radios

- KOPAJA48 Eps. 59 (September 30, 2020, Gen FM)
- KOPAJA48 Eps. 69 (December 16, 2020, Gen FM)
- GEN ON TALK with Freya and Fiony JKT48 (May 7, 2024, Gen FM)

Talkshows

- JKT48 – Idol Talkshow (Freya, Flora & Marsha) | fX Japan Rock & Idol vol.2 (2022)
- JKT48 Talkshow with Adel, Freya & Feni | JAK JAPAN MATSURI 2022 | fX Sudirman Jakarta (2022)

Theatres

- Sharehouse JKT48 (2021)
