= Ringgo Agus Rahman =

Indonesian actor (born 1982)

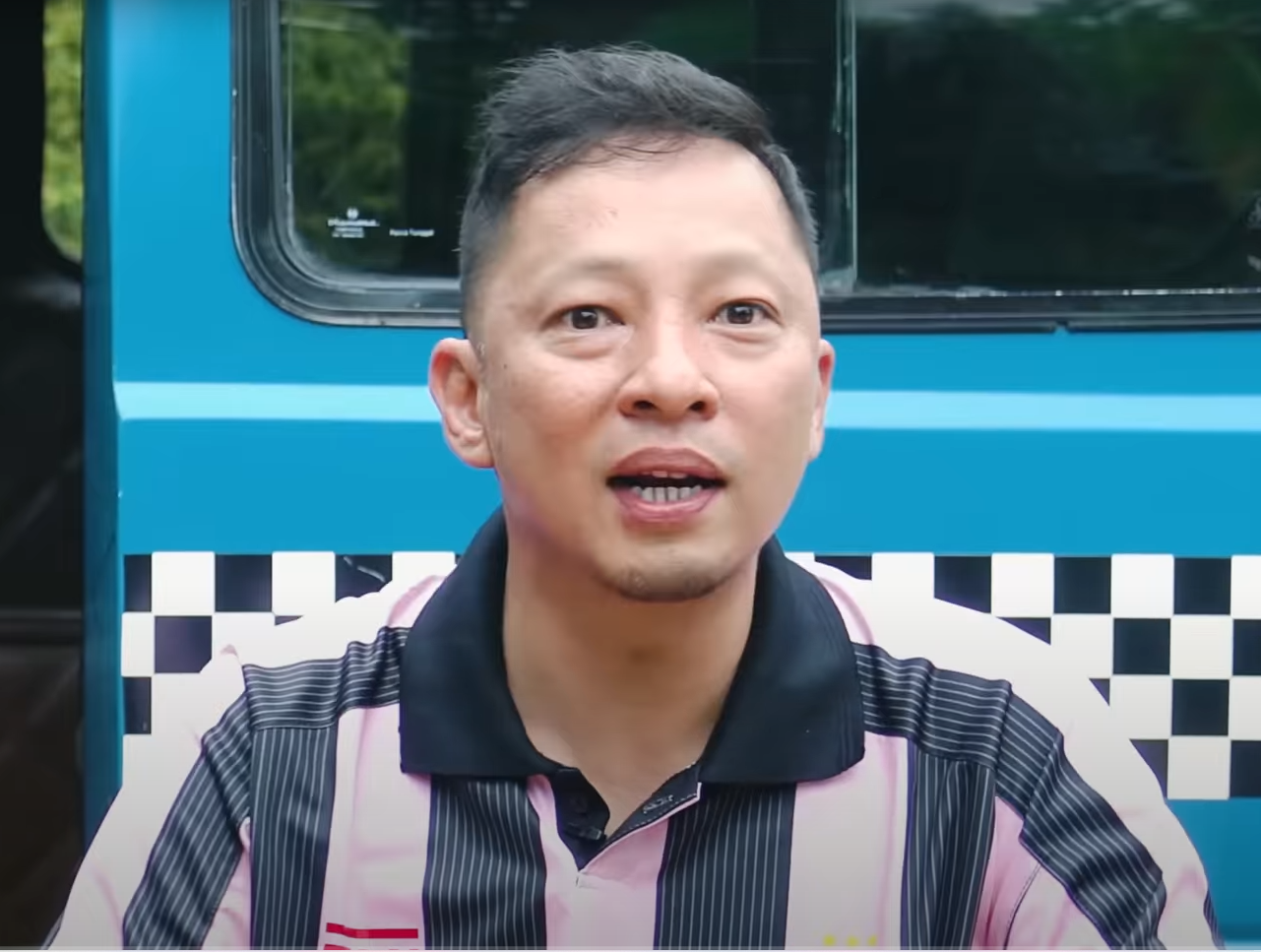
- Born: Agus Rahman; 12 August 1982 (age 43); Bandung, West Java, Indonesia
- Occupations: Actor; radio personality
- Years active: 2005–present
- Spouse: Sabai Morscheck (m. 2015)
- Children: 2

Ringgo Agus Rahman (born 12 August 1982) is an Indonesian actor and radio personality. He made his acting debut by starring as Agus in Hanung Bramantyo's Jomblo (2006). He won two Citra Awards for Best Actor for his performances in Falling in Love Like in Movies (2023) and Pawn (2025), becoming the first actor to win the award two years in a row.

== Career ==
Rahman's stage name, Ringgo, was derived from a character he played in a short film. The character's name was also the name of the director's pet. He started his career as a radio personality in Bandung. In 2005, he interviewed director Hanung Bramantyo during the promotional tour of Catatan Akhir Sekolah. He offered Rahman a role in his then-upcoming film. Rahman then auditioned and was cast as Agus in Jomblo.

== Personal life ==
Rahman married actress Sabai Morscheck on 7 June 2015 in Bali. They have two sons, born in February 2016 and October 2020 respectively.

== Filmography ==
Year	Title	Role	Notes
2006	Jomblo	Agus	
2006	Pocong 2	Adam	
2007	3 Days to Eternity	Edwina	
2007	Maaf, Saya Menghamili Istri Anda	Dibyo	
2007	Kamulah Satu-Satunya	Bona	
2007	Get Married	Beni	
2008	Oh, My God!	Marco	
2008	Fire Squad	Dede Rifa'i	
2009	Jagad X Code	Jagad	
2009	Kalau Cinta Jangan Cengeng	Boy	
2009	Anak Setan	Panji	
2009	Janda Kembang	Pak Dodi	
2009	Get Married 2	Beni	
2009	Bukan Malin Kundang	Ryan	
2010	Ngebut Kawin	Ones	
2010	Perjaka Terakhir 2	Sugeng	
2010	Aku atau Dia?	Asep	
2010	Senggol Bacok	Donny	
2010	Jakarta Twilight	Dokter	Segment: "Menunggu Aki"
2010	3 Pejantan Tanggung	Harta	
2011	Get Married 3	Beni	
2012	Kita Versus Korupsi	Markun	Segment: "Aku Padamu"
2012	Di Timur Matahari	Ucok	
2012	Tanah Surga... Katanya	dr. Anwar	
2013	Tampan Tailor	Darman	
2013	Leher Angsa	Village chief	
2013	Get M4rried	Beni	
2013	Slank Nggak Ada Matinya	Musisi	
2014	Sebelum Pagi Terulang Kembali	Jaka	
2014	About a Woman	Bimo	
2016	Jilbab Traveler: Love Sparks in Korea	Alvin	
2016	Pinky Promise	Vina's husband	
2017	Baracas (Barisan Anti Cinta Asmara)	Agus	
2017	Berangkat!	Dika	
2017	Satu Hari Nanti	Din	
2018	Koki-Koki Cilik	Koki Grant	
2018	Cemara's Family	Abah	
2019	Koki-Koki Cilik 2	Koki Grant	
2022	Pulang	Prasetyo	
2022	Cemara's Family 2	Abah	
2023	Fireworks	Raga	
2023	Falling In Love Like In Movies	Bagus Rahmat	
2024	A Brother and 7 Siblings	Eka	
2025	Call Me Dad	Dedi	Based on the 2020 South Korean film Pawn
2026	Me Before Me	Jaya	
