= Qodrat 2 =

2025 Indonesian horror film

- Theatrical release poster
- Directed by: Charles Gozali; Imron Ayikayu
- Written by: Asaf Antariksa; Gea Rexy; Charles Gozali
- Produced by: Linda Gozali Arya
- Starring: Vino G. Bastian; Acha Septriasa; Della Dartyan; Donny Alamsyah; Hana Saraswati
- Cinematography: Hani Pradigya
- Edited by: Teguh Rahardjo
- Music by: Aria Prayogi; Rahadian Winursito
- Production companies: Magma Entertainment; Rapi Films; Legacy Pictures; Astro Shaw; Ideosource Entertainment; Virtuelines Entertainment; Caravan Studio; Beacon Film
- Release dates: March 31, 2025 (Indonesia); September 25, 2025 (Netflix)
- Running time: 115 minutes
- Country: Indonesia
- Language: Indonesian

Qodrat 2 is a 2025 Indonesian supernatural religious action horror film directed by Charles Gozali and Imron Ayikayu. It is the sequel to Qodrat (2022). The film stars Vino G. Bastian and Acha Septriasa. It was by Magma Entertainment and Rapi Films, released in Indonesia on March 31, 2025. The film released for worldwide audience on Netflix, on September 25, 2025.

After the financial success of Qodrat, Rapi Films plans for a sequel. Filming took place in Pangalengan and Bandung Regency, the production invested in building real-life sets of the spinner mills, prison, tunnels. As in previous film, the production team also consulted Nahdhlatul Ulama socio-religious scientist Dr. Ngatawi Al-Zastrouw and professional raqi from Indonesia Ruqya House Ustad Isman Willyana during the production. Both ustads reviewed every script and acts taken by the performers, so their acts are real and in line with both Islamic values and Javanese culture.

A sequel and a spin-off, titled Dance of the Damned is in development.

On the first weak of its release, Qodrat 2 has gained more than one million viewers and in second week reached over 2 million viewers.

== Plot ==
Back during Qodrat exorcism of As'-Su' A'la from his son Alif Al-Fatanah, it is revealed that actually Azizah, Qodrat's wife also assisted the exorcism. However, in mid of exorcism, Azizah was tempted by another demon minion of As'-Su' A'la, Zhaduq. Zhaduq tricked Azizah to save Qodrat but with cost of her iman by declaring Zhaduq as her protector. As the result, the exorcism failed, and Alif was killed in process.

Qodrat returned to his original hometown, where he stays at his old house. Qodrat later found out that his wife was sent to mental institution after driven insane learning Qodrat killed by As'-Su A'la in prison. However, Qodrat found that Azizah already discharged and now working at Benang Emas Factory, a renowned spinning mill. In his way, he encountered Sukardi, husband of Murni and brother-in-law of Purwanti, that being bullied by Benang Emas Factory security guards due to demanding the explanation of Murni's death and release of Purwanti. After a fight and defending Sukardi from the guard's attack, Sukardi informed Qodrat that his wife and her sister is working in the factory too. Sukardi suspects that something suspicious happened inside the factory. They later overhear rumor by locals that the owner of the factory is a follower of pesugihan, a Javanese black magical way to enrich oneself by dealing with demons and blood contract. Locals also informed that during the building of the factory, a head of black buffalo was placed somewhere inside the factory.

Sukardi drive his truck with Qodrat to the factory. When Sukardi smokes, Qodrat smells cigarette smoked by Sukardi is off and realizing that Sukardi's cigarette had switched by someone with poisonous herbs and makanan jin (djinn's food), resulting Sukardi to be poisoned and possessed by a demon, Syaqwan. Under Syaqwan influence, Sukardi drove the truck off the cliff in attempt to kill Sukardi and Qodrat, to prevent them intervening. Qodrat exorcised Sukardi and drive Syaqwan away. Qodrat found there is a talisman with sigil of Syaqwan inside Sukardi's poisoned cigarette box and burned it along with the burning Sukardi's truck and take him to safety.

In Benang Emas Factory, a worker, Sri Wahyuni, killed as sacrifice to Zhaduq by being fed to an old spinner. Purwanti and Azizah found a talisman sewn inside the clothing of the worker and burned it. Purwanti and Azizah investigated themselves and learned that under the basement of the factory there are group worshipping a black buffallo head and invoking Zhaduq for pesugihan. The group is led by Safih, a black kejawèn dukun and spiritual advisor of the factory owner and followed by the factory owner, upper-levels, and guards. Purwanti able to escape, but Azizah is tripped and left behind. Azizah saved by Qodrat that able to infiltrate the factory by Sukardi's assistance and defeat some of guards. However, before Qodrat and Azizah escaped, the factory owner and Safih captured them. Safih tortured Qodrat and let him bleed to die for intervening and Azizah is taken as sacrifice to Zhaduq.

Qodrat eventually able to escape the binding and saved Azizah from being fed into an old spinner. Qodrat discovered a talisman sewn inside Azizah's clothing. The talisman is bearing sigil of Zhaduq, which is exact copy of the talisman found to the dead workers before and destroy the talisman just in time and drive Zhaduq away. Purwanti incites riot inside the factory and Sukardi found a way to go inside the factory. A riot broke. The factory owner ordered Safih to unleash santet (black magic) to mass possess and kill everyone until no witness left as he packed everything to flee. Qodrat able to exorcise all and return the santet, destroying the black buffalo altar used by Safih. Realizing he is defeated, Safih attempted to flee only to be encountered by Qodrat and killed by Qodrat. On another place, the factory owner is cornered by Sukardi and Purwanti and begged for mercy. The factory later collapsed and closed as the pesugihan practice exposed to public, and all of the surviving workers are saved by their relatives.

Qodrat bring Azizah to their old house. Zhaduq attempted to trick and misguide Azizah, but Qodrat helped her to repent her past sins. In return, Zhaduq invoked As'-Su A'la. As'-Su A'la and Zhaduq telekinetically drive furniture and sharp objects towards Azizah and killed her. As'-Su A'la vowed that he will target everyone Qodrat saved for his revenge before going away. Qodrat guides Azizah to last shahada and bury her near the house.

Taking As'-Su A'la threats, Qodrat speed his way back to Kober village. In Kober village, Kyai Rochim sensed someone sending a santet towards the village. As'-Su A'la attacked Yasmin and someone kidnapped Alif Amri and Asha. In another place, Asha is held in captivity by an unseen, crippled dukun in wheelchair, and Alif Amri is nowhere to be found.

== Cast ==
- Vino Bastian as Qodrat
- Acha Septriasa as Azizah
- Donny Alamsyah as Sukardi/Syaqwan
- Della Dartyan as Purwanti
- Hana Saraswati as Sri Wahyuni
- Septian Dwi Cahyo as Safih
- Norman R. Akyuwen as Benang Emas Factory Owner
- Fariz Alfarazi as Benang Emas Factory Head of Security
- Ridwan Roull Rohaz as Benang Emas Factory Security 1
- Afril Sabyan as Benang Emas Factory Security 2
- Jimmi Erniko as Benang Emas Factory Security 3
- Erwan Herliana as Benang Emas Factory Security 4
- Badra Wijaya as Zhaduq
- Teuku Rifnu Wikana as As'-Su' A'la
- Jason Doulez Beunaya Bangun as Alif Al-Fatanah/As'-Su' A'la
- Pritt Timothy as the old prisoner
- Whani Darmawan as the possessed warden
- Marsha Timothy as Yasmin
- Maudy Effrosina as Asha
- Keanu Azka as Alif Amri/As'-Su' A'la
- Cecep Arif Rahman as Kyai Rochim

== Production ==
In March 2023, it was announced that Qodrat 2 is in development.

The filming was done at Pangalengan, Bandung Regency. For the filming, the production invested in building real-life sets of the spinner mills, prison, tunnels. In total, the sets covered around 1000 square meters.

Aside the Islamic demonology and mystics, the film also convey messages of various issues in labour activism and women' rights.

As in previous film, the production team also consulted Nahdhlatul Ulama socio-religious scientist Dr. Ngatawi Al-Zastrouw and professional raqi from Indonesia Ruqya House Ustad Isman Willyana during the production. Both ustads reviewed every script and acts taken by the performers, so their acts are real and in line with both Islamic values and Javanese culture.

During the production and taking a scene where Qodrat mass exorcised the factory workers, accidentally, the actresses and extras used in that scene are really possessed and they were mistakenly thought are too immersed into their role by Charles Gozali, director of Qodrat 2. The mass possession event eventually handled by raqis from Indonesia Ruqya House.

== Reception ==
=== Box office ===
On the 3rd day of its release, Qodrat 2 has gained more than 350,000 tickets sales and viewers, surpassed one million viewers in just a week, in just 10 days had over 1,7 million viewers, and over 2 million viewers in its second week of release. Such success of the film in the market is appreciated directly by the Minister of Creative Economy, Teuku Riefky Harsya. The ministry also provides support of this film release to international market and Minister Harsya said that Qodrat 2 will be released on 9 countries. Qodrat 2 was released in the Malaysia on April 17, 2025. It had been viewed with a total 72,327 on the first day of its release.

== Sequel and spin-off ==
Charles Gozali, director of Qodrat 2, revealed that Qodrat 3 is in development. The film was announced as part of a planned trilogy.

A Villain-Focused spin-off, titled Dance of the Damned is in development by Magma Entertainment in partnership with Komet Production.

== See also ==
- Indonesian horror
- Spirit possession and exorcism in Islam
