= Artika Sari Devi =

Indonesian actress, music producer and Miss Universe Indonesia 2005

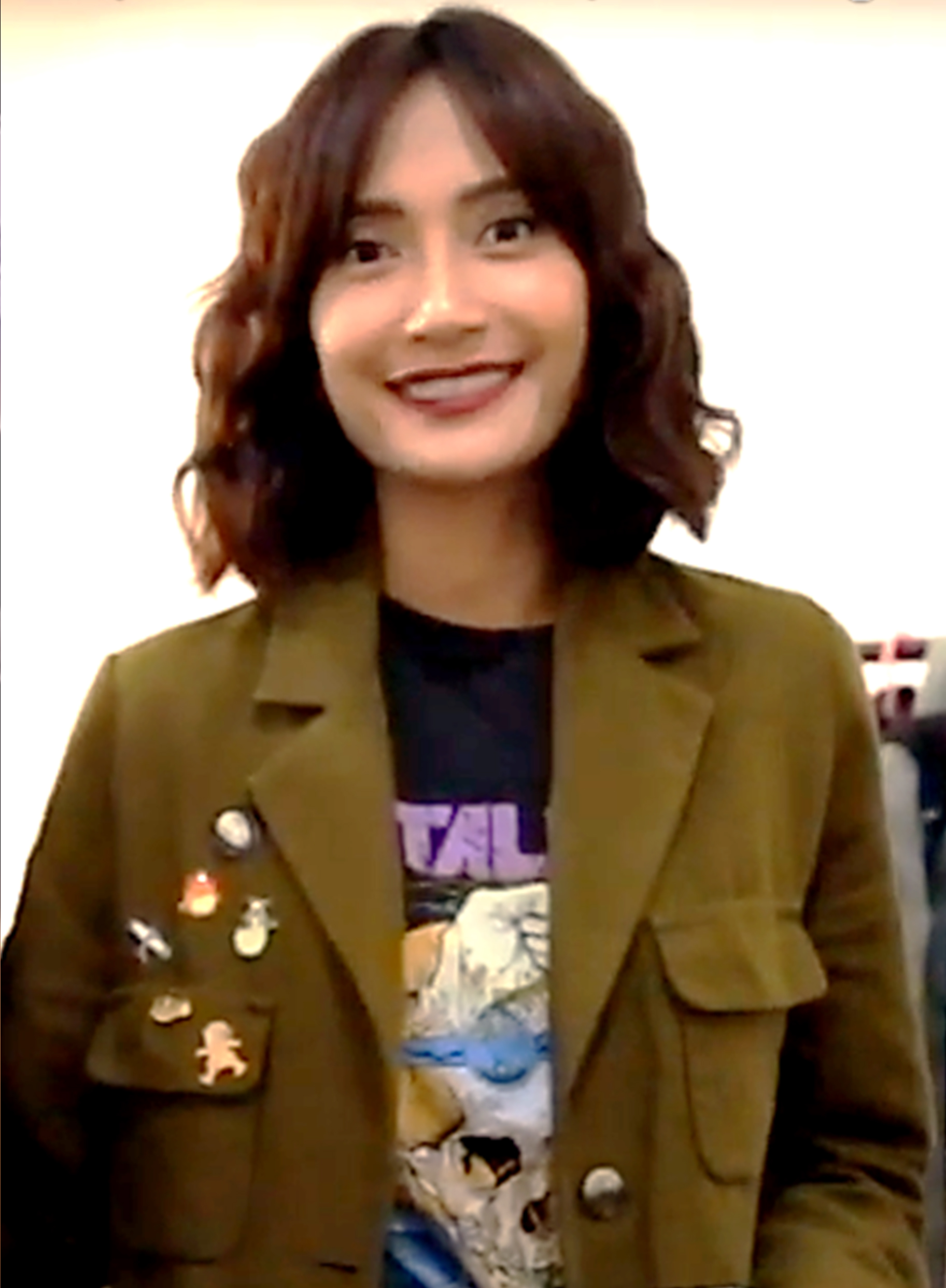
- Miss Universe Indonesia 2005, Artika Sari Devi Kusmayadi
- Born: Artika Sari Devi Kusmayadi; 29 September 1979 (age 47); Pangkal Pinang, Bangka-Belitung Islands, Indonesia
- Education: Gadjah Mada University; Islamic University of Indonesia
- Height: 5 ft 8 in (1.73 m)
- Spouse: Ibrahim Imran
- Children: Sarah Ebiela Ibrahim; Dayana Zoelie Ibrahim
- Parents: Tiko Kusmayadi (father); Poppy Dyah Retno Wulan (mother)
- Beauty pageant titleholder
- Title: Puteri Indonesia 2004 Miss Universe Indonesia 2005
- Hair color: Black
- Eye color: Black
- Major competitions: Puteri Indonesia 2004; (Winner); Miss Universe 2005; (Top 15)

Artika Sari Devi Kusmayadi (born 29 September 1979) is an Indonesian actress, music producer, model and beauty pageant titleholder who the winner of Puteri Indonesia 2004 (Miss Universe Indonesia). She also represented Indonesia in 2005 Miss Universe pageant in Bangkok, Thailand. She is the first ever Indonesian and Sumatran to be placed as a finalist in Miss Universe history.

== Early life and career ==
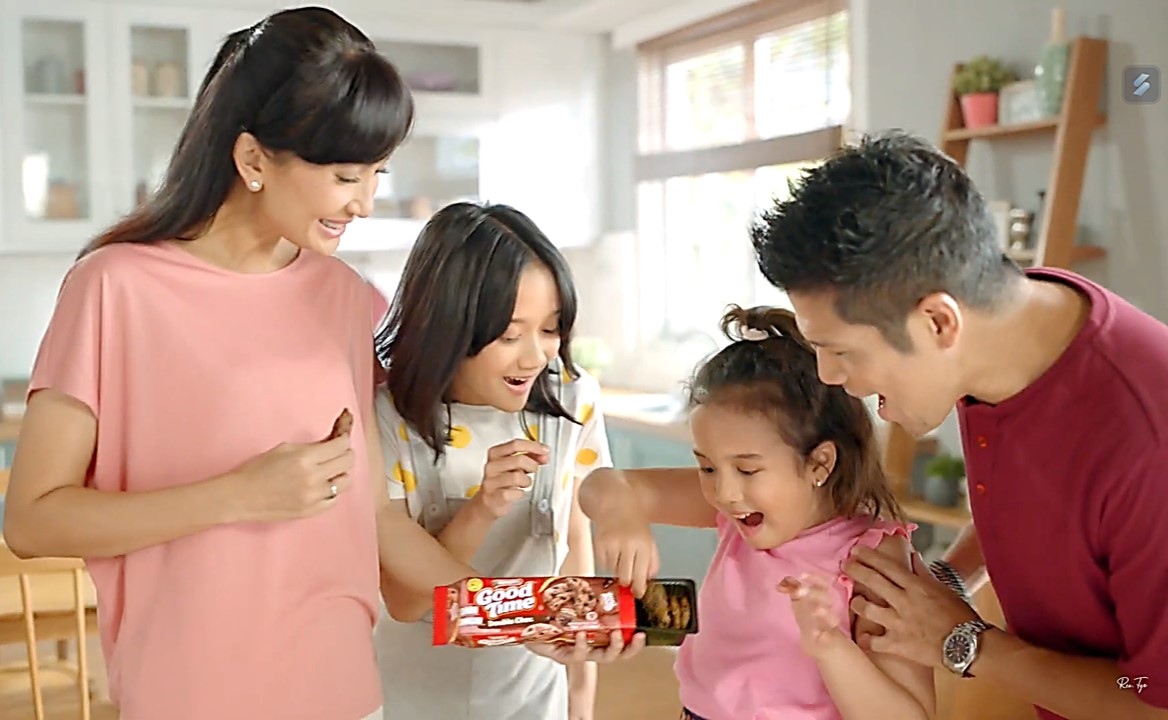
Devi with her husband and their children for Arnott's Goodtime Cookies TVC scene in 2021.

Devi was born in Pangkal Pinang, Bangka-Belitung Islands on 29 September 1979 to a Sumatran mother Poppy Dyah Retno Wulan and Javanese father Tiko Kusmayadi. Devi completed her Bachelor degree program in 2003, Bachelor of Laws (LL.B) from Islamic University of Indonesia and in 2007 she also finished her Master of Law in Notary (M.LN) from Gadjah Mada University in Yogyakarta - Indonesia. In 2008, She is married to Hong Kong singer-songwriter Ibrahim Imran, and they have two children together, Sarah Abiela Ibrahim (2009) and Dayana Zoelie Ibrahim (2011).

Besides being a full-time mother, Devi also runs a fashion line for kids called "Sugar Bebe Indonesia". In 2016, Artika together with Puteri Indonesia 2013 beauty pageant alumna Whulandary Herman, open the "ArtikaWhulandary Beauty Camp" to sharpen the skills of Indonesian women who are interested in joining local or international beauty pageants, the beauty camp idea is first initiated in 2013.

== Pageantry ==
=== Puteri Indonesia 2004 ===
At the age of 25, she represented Bangka Belitung Islands in the Puteri Indonesia 2004 pageant, and was crowned on 6 August 2004 in the Jakarta Convention Center.

=== Miss Universe 2005 ===
Devi represented Indonesia in Miss Universe 2005 and was the first Indonesian woman to advance to semifinals, competed in the Evening Gown Competition finished in the Top 15.

=== Post-Miss Universe ===
Although not reported to the police, there was a controversy surrounding her involvement in the Miss Universe 2005 pageant, Devi was accused of breaking the Code of Law 281, edict number 01/U/1984, regarding cultural and educational conducts, Indonesian law forbids any kind of involvement in international beauty pageants and considers such as immoral. In 2006, the winner of Puteri Indonesia 2005 and participant of Miss Universe 2006, Nadine Chandrawinata was also reported to the police, which eventually traced back to Artika Sari Devi and the Puteri Indonesia Foundation.

== Filmography ==
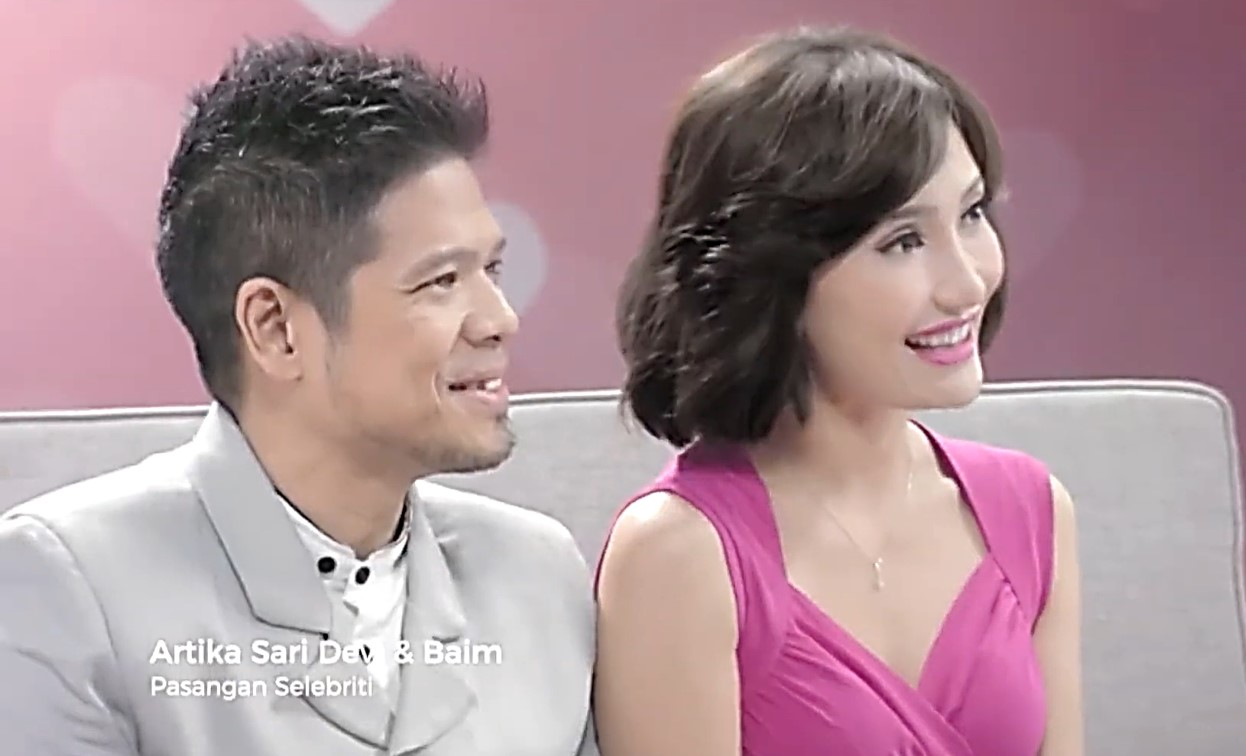
Devi with her husband Ibrahim Imran in 2017.

Devi started her foray into the world of acting, after starring in a musical Indonesian film called "Opera Jawa" (Requiem from Java) directed by Garin Nugroho, which was nominated for 2006 Toronto International Film Festival, 2006 London Film Festival, 2006 Pusan International Film Festival and 2006 Venice Film Festival. The movie also being nominated for "Best Movie" in Indonesian Film Festival, won the Silver Screen Award for Best Film at the 2007 Singapore International Film Festival. In late 2023, she is currently preparing herself for her upcoming comedy film.

=== Movies ===
Year	Title	Genre	Role	Film Production	Ref.
2006	Opera Jawa	musical	as Siti	Garin Nugroho	
2007	Mati Bujang Tengah Malam	romance	as Indie	Manoj Punjabi	
2008	Planet Mars	romance	as Jasmine	Manoj Punjabi	
2008	Lastri	thriller	as Devi	Keana Production	
2010	Roman Picisan	romance	as Canting	MD Entertainment	
2014	Sang Pemberani	drama	as Sarifah	Eclipse Films	
2019	Perjanjian dengan Iblis	horror	as Rengganis	MD Entertainment	

=== Music videos ===
Since 2017, together with her husband Ibrahim Imran, Devi composed and produced several songs. In 2020, they produced award-winning song named "Adikku Tersayang" (in english: My Dearest Sister) sang by their oldest daughter Sarah Ebiela Ibrahim with a stage name Abbey Ibrahim. Eventually the song nominated as "Best Children's Song Creator" in Anugerah Musik Indonesia Awards 2020, and Devi together with her husband won the title.

Year	Title	Role	Singer/Artist	Ref.
2018	Pelangi Usai Hujan "Rainbow After Rain"	as songwriter and producer	Ibrahim Imran ft. Abbey Ibrahim & Zoe Ibrahim	
2019	Melati Suci "Holy Jasmine"	as songwriter and producer	Abbey Ibrahim	
2020	Adikku Tersayang "My Dearest Sister"	as songwriter and producer	Abbey Ibrahim	
2021	Senandung Untuk Nusantara "Hum for the Archipelago"	as songwriter and producer	Abbey Ibrahim ft Clarissa Dewi	

== Awards and nomination ==
Year	Awards	Category	Nominated work	Result	Ref.
2006	Nantes Three Continents Festival	Best Actress	Opera Jawa	Won	
2008	Brussels International Independent Film Festival	Best Actress	Opera Jawa	Won	
2020	Anugerah Musik Indonesia Awards 2020	Best Children's Song Creator	My Dearest Sister	Won	

Awards and achievements
Preceded by Else Gustiana Syaiful	Puteri Bangka Belitung; 2004	Succeeded by Danna Wulansari
Preceded by Jakarta SCR 2 – Dian Khrisna	Puteri Indonesia; 2004	Succeeded by Jakarta SCR 4 – Nadine Chandrawinata
