= Festival Film Bandung =

Indonesian film and television award ceremony

- Awarded for: Excellence in cinematic achievements
- Country: Indonesia
- Presented by: Forum Film Bandung
- First award: 1987
- Website: festivalfilmbandung.com

Festival Film Bandung is an accolade presented by the Forum Film Bandung to recognize cinematic achievements in the Indonesian film and television industry. It is held annually in Bandung, West Java, Indonesia.

== History ==
In 1987, producer Chand Parwez Servia initiated the film prize along with Bandung-based film journalists and critics. During the decline of Indonesian cinema in the 1990s, the awards shifted to exclusively honor television films and international films.

== Categories ==
As of the 2025 ceremony, the following categories are presented at the Festival Film Bandung.

Film

- Highly Commended Film
- Highly Commended Director
- Highly Commended Leading Actor
- Highly Commended Leading Actress
- Highly Commended Supporting Actor
- Highly Commended Supporting Actress
- Highly Commended Screenplay
- Highly Commended Cinematography
- Highly Commended Art Direction
- Highly Commended Editing
- Highly Commended Original Score
- Highly Commended International Film

Web

- Highly Commended Web Series
- Highly Commended Director
- Highly Commended Leading Actor
- Highly Commended Leading Actress
- Highly Commended Supporting Actor
- Highly Commended Supporting Actress

Television

- Highly Commended Leading Actor
- Highly Commended Leading Actress

== Ceremonies ==
Edition	Date	Highly Commended Film winner	Ref.
No award records exist for 1987–2007
21st	30 April 2008	Verses of Love	
22nd	24 April 2009	Laskar Pelangi	
23rd	23 April 2010	Emak Ingin Naik Haji	
24th	6 May 2011	Sang Pencerah	
25th	12 May 2012	The Mirror Never Lies	
26th	15 June 2013	5 cm	
27th	13 September 2014	Soekarno	
28th	12 September 2015	Guru Bangsa: Tjokroaminoto	
29th	24 September 2016	Rudy Habibie	
30th	22 October 2017	Check the Store Next Door	
31st	24 November 2018	Sultan Agung Mataram 1628	
32nd	22 November 2019	Two Blue Stripes	
33rd	14 November 2020	This Earth of Mankind	
34th	23 October 2021	Not awarded	
35th	9 November 2022	Yuni	
36th	27 October 2023	Like & Share	
37th	9 November 2024	Harlot's Prayer	
38th	31 October 2025	Sore: A Wife from the Future	
39th	22 August 2026	TBA	
