= 2024 Indonesian Film Festival =

2024 Indonesian film awards

44th Indonesian Film Festival
- Promotional poster
- Awarded for: The achievement in Indonesian cinema
- Presented by: Indonesian Film Board; Ministry of Culture
- Announced on: Nominations: 18 October 2024
- Presented on: 20 November 2024
- Site: Indonesia Convention Exhibition, BSD City, Banten, Indonesia
- Official website: festivalfilm.id

Highlights
- Most awards: Falling In Love Like In Movies (7)
- Most nominations: Grave Torture (17)

The 44th Indonesian Film Festival ceremony, presented by Indonesian Film Board and Ministry of Culture, honored the achievement in Indonesian cinema released from 1 September 2023 to 31 August 2024. The ceremony was held on 20 November 2024 at the Indonesia Convention Exhibition, BSD City, Banten.

Special award, Antemas Award, was set to be presented again this year after last being awarded at the 1992 ceremony. This award is given to the highest-grossing film.

Romantic drama Falling In Love Like In Movies won the most awards with seven, including Best Picture and all four acting categories. Other winners included Samsara with four and Borderless Fog with three.

== Winners and nominees ==
The nominations were announced on 18 October 2024 at the Fort Vredeburg Museum, Yogyakarta, Indonesia, by Dian Sastrowardoyo, Kamila Andini, Lutesha, and Bryan Domani. Horror film Grave Torture received the most nominations with a record-tying seventeen (2020's Impetigore, 2021's Photocopier, and 2023's Andragogy also achieved this distinction); crime thriller film Borderless Fog came in second with twelve and drama film Falling In Love Like In Movies with eleven.

=== Awards ===
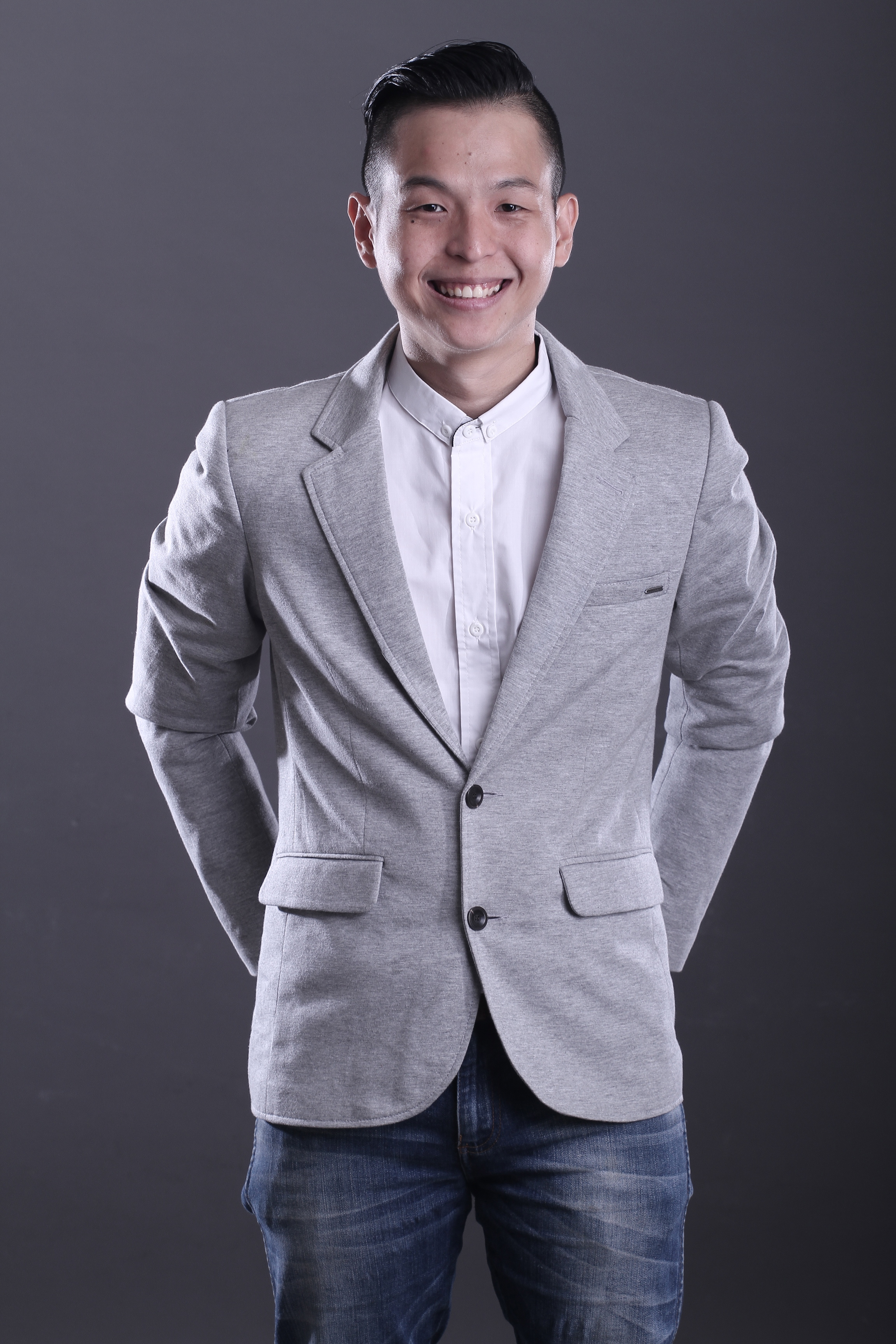
Ernest Prakasa, Best Picture co-winner

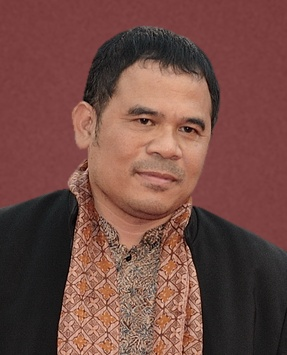
Garin Nugroho, Best Director winner

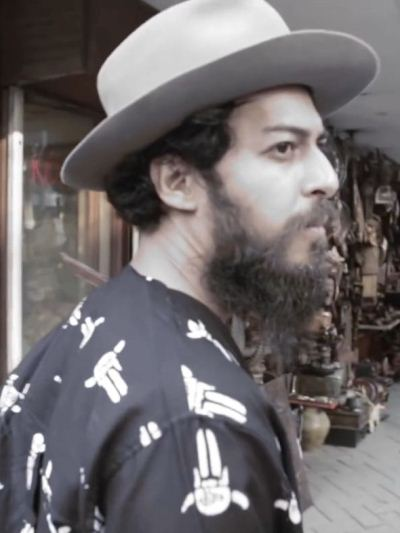
Alex Abbad, Best Supporting Actor winner

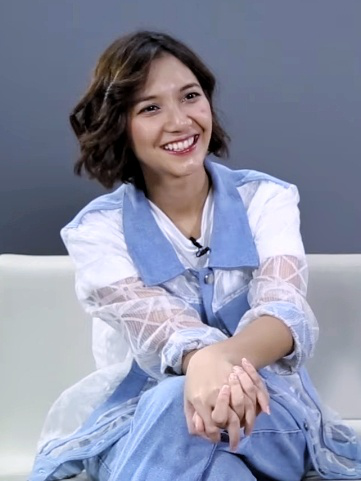
Sheila Dara Aisha, Best Supporting Actress winner

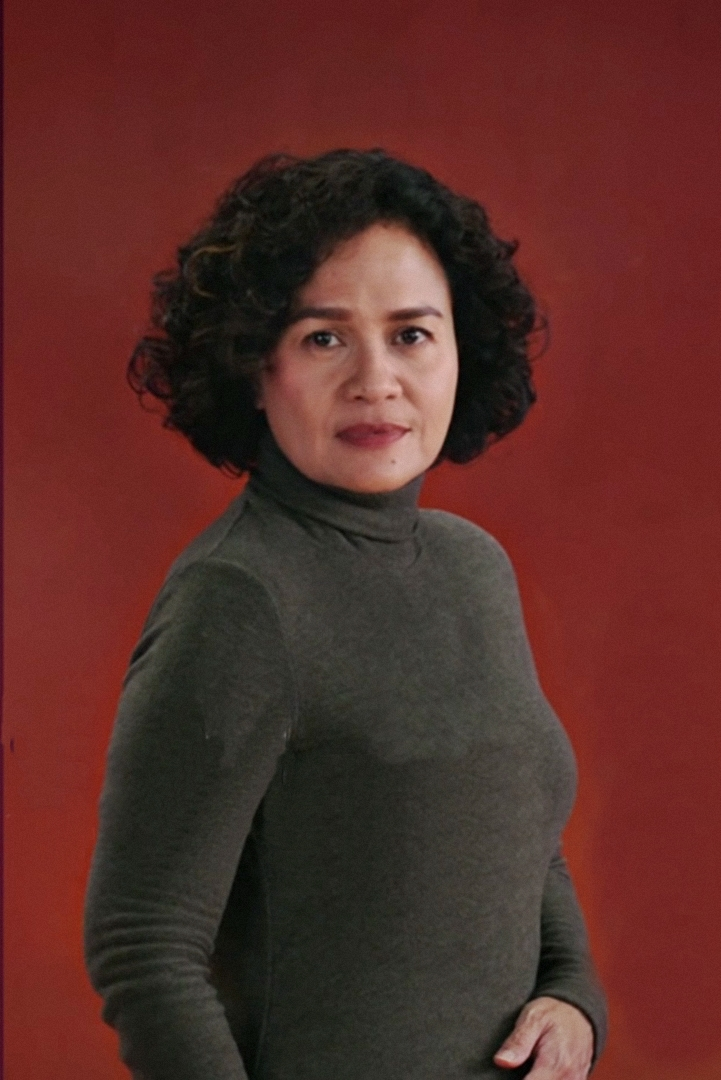
Mira Lesmana, Best Adapted Screenplay co-winner

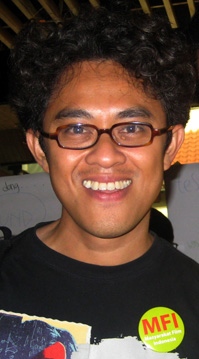
Riri Riza, Best Adapted Screenplay co-winner

Winners are listed first, highlighted in boldface, and indicated with a double dagger (‡).

**Best Picture**: **Falling In Love Like In Movies – Ernest Prakasa and Suryana Paramita**‡; Borderless Fog – Meiske Taurisia and Muhammad Zaidy; Crocodile Tears – Mandy Marahimin; Grave Torture – Tia Hasibuan; Samsara – Gita Fara and Aldo Swastia	**Best Director**: **Garin Nugroho – Samsara**‡; Edwin – Borderless Fog; Joko Anwar – Grave Torture; Tumpal Tampubolon – Crocodile Tears; Yandy Laurens – Falling In Love Like In Movies
**Best Actor**: **Ringgo Agus Rahman – Falling In Love Like In Movies as Bagus**‡; Ario Bayu – Samsara as Darta; Arswendy Bening Swara – Badrun & Loundri as Badrun; Reza Rahadian – Grave Torture as Adil; Yoga Pratama – Borderless Fog as Thomas	**Best Actress**: **Nirina Zubir – Falling In Love Like In Movies as Hana**‡; Aghniny Haque – Harlot's Prayer as Kiran; Faradina Mufti – Grave Torture as Sita; Laura Basuki – Heartbreak Motel as Ava; Marissa Anita – Crocodile Tears as Mama
**Best Supporting Actor**: **Alex Abbad – Falling In Love Like In Movies as Yoram**‡; Arswendy Bening Swara – Grave Torture as Pandi; Donny Damara – Harlot's Prayer as Tomo; Lukman Sardi – Borderless Fog as Panca; Slamet Rahardjo Djarot – Grave Torture as Wahyu Sutama/Ilham Sutisna	**Best Supporting Actress**: **Sheila Dara Aisha – Falling In Love Like In Movies as Cheline**‡; Asmara Abigail – Till Death Do Us Part as Asmara; Lutesha – Goodbye, Farewell as Vanya; Widuri Puteri – Grave Torture as young Sita; Zulfa Maharani – Crocodile Tears as Arumi
**Best Original Screenplay**: **Falling In Love Like In Movies – Yandy Laurens**‡; Agak Laen – Muhadkly Acho; Borderless Fog – Ifan Ismail and Edwin; Crocodile Tears – Tumpal Tampubolon; Grave Torture – Joko Anwar	**Best Adapted Screenplay**: **Petualangan Sherina 2 – Jujur Prananto, Mira Lesmana, Riri Riza, and Virania Munaf; based on the characters from the film Petualangan Sherina by Prananto**‡; The Architecture of Love – Alim Sudio and Ika Natassa; based on the novel by Natassa; Harlot's Prayer – Ifan Ismail; based on the novel Tuhan Izinkan Aku Menjadi Pelacur! by Muhiddin M. Dahlan; Ipar Adalah Maut – Oka Aurora; based on the story by Elizasifaa; Two Blue Hearts – Gina S. Noer; based on the characters from the film Two Blue Stripes by Noer
**Best Cinematography**: **Samsara – Batara Goempar**‡; 13 Bombs in Jakarta – Arnand Pratikto; Borderless Fog – Gunnar Nimpuno; Grave Torture – Ical Tanjung; Heartbreak Motel – Arnand Pratikto	**Best Editing**: **Ipar Adalah Maut – Wawan I. Wibowo**‡; The Architecture of Love – Aline Jusria; Falling In Love Like In Movies – Hendra Adhi Susanto; Harlot's Prayer – Haris F. Syah; Monster – Sentot Sahid and Iriani Irin
**Best Visual Effects**: **Borderless Fog – Lumine Studio**‡; 13 Bombs in Jakarta – After Lab, Urat Nadi, and Mattebox Visualworks; Grave Torture – Lumine Studio, TheCutShop, Qanary Studios, The Organism NO3G Visual Effect, and Abby Eldipie; Monster – Dalang Kreasi; Respati – Edbert Joshua Angga	**Best Sound**: **Grave Torture – Mohamad Ikhsan and Anhar Moha**‡; Borderless Fog – Tommy Fahrizal and Wahyu Tri Purnomo; Falling In Love Like In Movies – Syaifullah Praditya and Arif Budi Santoso; Petualangan Sherina 2 – Aria Prayogi and Yusuf Patawari; Samsara – Janu Janardhana and Sutrisno
**Best Original Score**: **Samsara – Wayan Sudirana and Kasimyn**‡; Borderless Fog – Abel Huray and Dave Lumenta; Falling In Love Like In Movies – Ofel Obaja Setiawan; Grave Torture – Aghi Narottama; Petualangan Sherina 2 – Sherina Munaf	**Best Theme Song**: **"Bercinta Lewat Kata" from Falling In Love Like In Movies – Donne Maula**‡; "Agak Laen" from Agak Laen – Bene Dion Rajagukguk, Boris Bokir Manullang, Indra Jegel, and Oki Rengga; "Jalan Pulang" from Grave Torture – Tony Merle and Tia Hasibuan; "Kisah Anak Manusia" from Grave Torture – Bemby Gusti and Tia Hasibuan; "Mengenang Bintang" from Petualangan Sherina 2 – Sherina Munaf, Mira Lesmana, and Virania Munaf
**Best Art Direction**: **Borderless Fog – Menfo Tantono and Guntur Mupak**‡; 13 Bombs in Jakarta – Ahmad Zulkarnaen; Grave Torture – Allan Sebastian; Heartbreak Motel – Adrianto Sinaga; Petualangan Sherina 2 – Eros Eflin; Samsara – Vida Sylvia	**Best Costume Design**: **Samsara – Retno Ratih Damayanti**‡; The Architecture of Love – Hagai Pakan; Borderless Fog – Muthiara A. Rievena Putri; Grave Torture – Monika Paska; Heartbreak Motel – Fadillah Putri Yunidar
**Best Makeup**: **Borderless Fog – Cherry Wirawan**‡; Grave Torture – Novie Ariyanti; Hamka & Siti Raham Vol. 2 – Jerry Octavianus; Heartbreak Motel – Aktris Handradjasa; Samsara – Retno Ratih Damayanti	**Best Live Action Short Film**: **Suintrah – Ayesha Alma Almera and Sofhy Pratiwi**‡; Hitler Mati di Surabaya – Dhamar Jagad Gautama, Rizky Kurniawan, Dendy Ariza, and Alhaj Fernando; The Lady In White – Angkasa Ramadhan and Rien Al-Anshari; Laut Memendam Luka – Mariam Gesti Pratiwi and Linus Galih; Maia – Nia Sari and Kristo Parinters Makur; Pencatat Rindu Yang Datang di Tengah Malam – Wisnu Surya Pratama, M. As'ad Aswin, and Suci Wijayati; Shallot Salad – B. W. Purbanegara and Bagus Suitrawan
**Best Documentary Feature**: **Under the Moonlight – Tonny Trimarsanto, Es Damayanti, and John Badalu**‡; Ibnu Nurwanto – Sang Kayu – Eriliando Erick; The Journey: Angklung Goes to Europe – Maulana M. Syuhada; Koesroyo: The Last Man Standing – Linda Ochy and Andhy Pulung; Terpejam Untuk Melihat – Mahatma Putra, Muttaqiena Imaamaa and Anggita Panji Nayantaka	**Best Documentary Short Film**: **My Therapist Said, I Am Full of Sadness – Monica Vanesa Tedja, John Badalu, Astrid Saerong, and Gugi Gumilang**‡; Dia Pergi dan Belum Kembali – Riani Singgih and Kinari Adiarni; Mama Jo – Ineu Rahmawati and Agus Ramdan S.; Neraka Perbatasan: Jejak Mafia Judi Online dan Perbudakan Digital di Asia – Suara Kembara and Sabda Armandio; Rainha Boki Raja: Ratu Ternate Abad Keenam Belas – Fendi Siregar and Inda Citraninda Noerhadi; Sang Penyintas Gagal Ginjal – Dwi Puspita Sari and Suhud Noor Fadli
**Best Animated Feature**: **Si Juki the Movie: Harta Pulau Monyet – Faza Meonk, Daryl Wilson, and Frederica**‡; Kiko In the Deep Sea – Sally Wongso, Heri Kurniawan, Dezi Ruwah Rezeki, and Esaf Andreas Sinaulan; Perkasa – Amin Wibawa, Yudhatama, and Holip Soekawan	**Best Animated Short Film**: **Cangkir Profesor – Yudhatama**‡; Jelangkung Golek Wangsulan – Zuhair Bari' Fawwaz and Sulthan Hafidh Awwaludin; Kamu... Antta – Cicis Martantio and Novia Puspa Sari; Remember Me – Ade Riadi Cen; Screen Time – Yumna Taqiyyah and Darrell Aydin Bahy
**Best Film Critic** **(Tanete Pong Masak Award)**: **Reza Mardian for his TikTok account – "Jagat Yang Sempit dan Determinasi Diri dalam Film Yuni (2021)"**‡; Aurelia Gracia for Magdalene – "Trigger Warning, Kekerasan Seksual dan Women from Rote Island (2023)"; Della Rosa for Sarekat Hijau Indonesia – "Menggali Verfremdungseffekt: Alienasi Kesadaran Kritis dari Imagineri Karakter Prani dalam Film Budi Pekerti (2023)"; Mochammed Fadliawan for LPM Pressisi – "Melanggengkan Hororisasi Seni di Desa Penari: Representasi Tari dalam KKN di Desa Penari (2022) dan Badarawuhi di Desa Penari (2024)"	**Antemas Award**: **Agak Laen**
**Lifetime Achievement Awards**: **Imam Tantowi**; **Gope T. Samtani**

=== Audience awards ===
**Nya' Abbas Akup Award for Favorite Film**: **Grave Torture – Tia Hasibuan**
**Rachmat Hidajat Award for Favorite Actor**: **Afrian Arisandy – Grave Torture as mysterious man**	**Mieke Widjaja Award for Favorite Actress**: **Prilly Latuconsina – Puspa Indah Taman Hati as Marlina**

=== Films with multiple nominations and awards ===
Films that received multiple nominations
Nominations	Film
17	Grave Torture
12	Borderless Fog
11	Falling In Love Like In Movies
9	Samsara
5	Crocodile Tears
5	Heartbreak Motel
5	Petualangan Sherina 2
4	Harlot's Prayer
3	13 Bombs in Jakarta
3	The Architecture of Love
2	Agak Laen
2	Ipar Adalah Maut
2	Monster

Films with multiple wins
Awards	Film
7	Falling In Love Like In Movies
4	Samsara
3	Borderless Fog

== Presenters and performers ==
The following individuals, listed in order of appearance, presented awards or performed musical numbers:

Presenters
Name(s)	Role
Mira Lesmana	Presented the awards for Best Animated Short Film, Best Animated Feature, and Best Live Action Short Film
Jajang C. Noer	Presented the awards for Best Costume Design and Best Makeup
Chicco Kurniawan	Presented the award for Best Supporting Actress
Laura Basuki	Presented the award for Best Supporting Actor
Yoga Pratama	Presented the awards for Best Visual Effects and Best Editing
Andi Rianto	Presented the awards for Best Original Score, Best Theme Song, and Best Sound
Arswendy Bening Swara	Presented the awards for Best Art Direction and Best Cinematography
Ario Bayu; Soleh Ruslani	Presented the Lifetime Achievement Awards
Chelsea Islan; Marthino Lio	Presented the Audience Awards
Prilly Latuconsina	Presented the Antemas Award
Sekar Ayu Asmara	Presented the awards for Best Original Screenplay and Best Adapted Screenplay
Lola Amaria	Presented the awards for Best Documentary Short Film and Best Documentary Feature
Sha Ine Febriyanti	Presented the award for Best Actor
Lukman Sardi	Presented the award for Best Actress
Ifa Isfansyah	Presented the award for Best Director
Adinia Wirasti; Bambang Supriadi; Dewi Alibasah; Ismail Basbeth; Leni Lolang; Ong Hari Wahyu; Ramondo Gascaro; Titien Wattimena; Tito Imanda	Presented the award for Best Picture

Performers
Name(s)	Role	Work
Tohpati	Musical director	
Sherina Munaf	Performer	"Layar Cerita"
Sal Priadi	Performer	"Gala Bunga Matahari" during the "In Memoriam" tribute
Anggun	Performer	"Panggung Sandiwara" from Duo Kribo (1977) "Badai Pasti Berlalu" from Badai Pasti Berlalu (1977) "Mengejar Matahari" from Mengejar Matahari (2004)
Anggun	Performer	"Citra"
