= Citra Award for Best Cinematography =

Award given annually at the Indonesian Film Festival

- Country: Indonesia
- Presented by: Indonesian Film Festival
- First award: 1955
- Currently held by: Batara Goempar for Samsara (2024)
- Website: festivalfilm.id

The Citra Award for Best Cinematography (Indonesian: Piala Citra untuk Pengarah Sinematografi Terbaik) is an award presented annually at the Indonesian Film Festival since its inaugural edition in 1955, to honor the achievement in cinematography. Starting in 1979, the award began to introduce nominees.

== Winners and nominees ==
=== 1950s to 1960s ===
Year	Film	Nominee(s)
1955 (1st)	Belenggu Masjarakat	Lie Gie San ‡
1960 (2nd)	Anakku Sajang	Sjamsuddin Jusuf ‡
1967 (3rd)	2x24 Djam	Akin ‡
1967 (3rd)	Menjusuri Djedjak Berdarah	Sjamsuddin Jusuf ‡
1967 (3rd)	Petir Sepandjang Malam	Sjamsuddin Jusuf ‡

=== 1970s ===
Year	Film	Nominee(s)
1973 (4th)	Perkawinan	Lukman Hakim Nain ‡
1974 (5th)	Cinta Pertama	Akin ‡
1975 (6th)	Dikejar Dosa	Lukman Hakim Nain ‡
1976 (7th)	Cinta	Lukman Hakim Nain ‡
1977 (8th)	Ateng Sok Tau	Sjamsuddin Jusuf ‡
1978 (9th)	Badai Pasti Berlalu	Lukman Hakim Nain ‡
1979 (10th)	November 1828	Tantra Surjadi ‡
1979 (10th)	Pengemis dan Tukang Becak	Lukman Hakim Nain
1979 (10th)	Pulau Cinta	Akin

=== 1980s ===
Year	Film	Nominee(s)
1980 (11th)	Kabut Sutra Ungu	Leo Fiole ‡
1980 (11th)	Ach yang Benerrr...	Lukman Hakim Nain
1980 (11th)	Anna Maria	Hasan Basri Jafar
1980 (11th)	Rembulan dan Matahari	Tantra Surjadi
1980 (11th)	Yuyun Pasien Rumah Sakit Jiwa	M. Soleh Ruslani
1981 (12th)	Perempuan dalam Pasungan	Tantra Surjadi ‡
1981 (12th)	Buah Hati Mama	Alex A. Hassan
1981 (12th)	Bukan Sandiwara	Lukman Hakim Nain
1981 (12th)	Usia 18	Akin
1982 (13th)	Jangan Ambil Nyawaku	Akin ‡
1982 (13th)	Ratu Ilmu Hitam	Asmawi
1982 (13th)	Serangan Fajar	M. Soleh Ruslani
1983 (14th)	R. A. Kartini	Soetomo Gandasoebrata ‡
1983 (14th)	Perkawinan 83	Harry Simon
1983 (14th)	Roro Mendut	Adrian Susanto
1983 (14th)	Titian Serambut Dibelah Tujuh	M. Soleh Ruslani
1984 (15th)	Budak Nafsu	Soetomo Gandasoebrata ‡
1984 (15th)	Johanna	Harry Simon
1984 (15th)	Pengkhianatan G30S/PKI	Hasan Basri Jafar
1984 (15th)	Ponirah Terpidana	Tantra Surjadi
1984 (15th)	Yang	Adrian Susanto
1985 (16th)	Doea Tanda Mata	George Kamarullah ‡
1985 (16th)	Kembang Kertas	Tantra Surjadi
1985 (16th)	Secangkir Kopi Pahit	Tantra Surjadi
1985 (16th)	Tinggal Landas buat Kekasih	Harry Simon
1986 (17th)	Ibunda	George Kamarullah ‡
1986 (17th)	Bila Saatnya Tiba	Lukman Hakim Nain
1986 (17th)	Matahari-Matahari	Harry Susanto
1986 (17th)	Opera Jakarta	Soetomo Gandasoebrata
1987 (18th)	Kodrat	M. Soleh Ruslani ‡
1987 (18th)	Arini, Masih Ada Kereta yang akan Lewat	Harry Simon
1987 (18th)	Biarkan Bulan Itu	Adrian Susanto
1987 (18th)	Cintaku di Rumah Susun	F. E. S. Tarigan
1987 (18th)	Secawan Anggur Kebimbangan	Harry Simon
1988 (19th)	Tjoet Nja' Dhien	George Kamarullah ‡
1988 (19th)	Akibat Kanker Payudara	Irwan Tahyar
1988 (19th)	Selamat Tinggal Jeanette	George Kamarullah
1988 (19th)	Terang Bulan di Tengah Hari	Tantra Surjadi
1989 (20th)	Noesa Penida	W.A. Cokrowardoyo ‡
1989 (20th)	Pacar Ketinggalan Kereta	Herman Susilo
1989 (20th)	Tragedi Bintaro	William Samara

=== 1990s ===
Year	Film	Nominee(s)
1990 (21st)	My Sky, My Home	Soetomo Gandasoebrata ‡
1990 (21st)	Cas Cis Cus (Sonata di Tengah Kota)	F. E. S. Tarigan
1990 (21st)	Catatan si Boy IV	Harry Susanto
1990 (21st)	Jeram Cinta	Adrian Susanto
1990 (21st)	Joe Turun ke Desa	M. Soleh Ruslani
1991 (22nd)	Cinta dalam Sepotong Roti	M. Soleh Ruslani ‡
1991 (22nd)	Langit Kembali Biru	Harry Susanto
1991 (22nd)	Potret	M. Soleh Ruslani
1991 (22nd)	Soerabaia 45	Max J. Pakasi
1991 (22nd)	Zig Zag	Akin
1992 (23rd)	Plong (Naik Daun)	F. E. S. Tarigan ‡
1992 (23rd)	Badai Laut Selatan	Thomas Susanto
1992 (23rd)	Kuberikan Segalanya	M. Soleh Ruslani
1992 (23rd)	Mer's Lips	M. Soleh Ruslani
1992 (23rd)	Ramadhan dan Ramona	Harry Susanto

=== 2000s ===
Year	Film	Nominee(s)
2004 (24th)	Mengejar Matahari	Ipung Rachmat Syaiful ‡
2004 (24th)	Arisan!	Yudi Datau
2004 (24th)	Marsinah, Cry Justice	Yudi Datau
2004 (24th)	What's Up with Love?	Roy Lolang
2004 (24th)	Whispering Sands	Yadi Sugandi
2005 (25th)	Gie	Yudi Datau ‡
2005 (25th)	Brownies	Tommy Jepang
2005 (25th)	Janji Joni	Ipung Rachmat Syaiful
2005 (25th)	Last Second	Bambang Supriadi
2005 (25th)	Virgin	Tommy Jepang
2006 (26th)	Denias, Senandung Di Atas Awan	Yudi Datau ‡
2006 (26th)	Heart	Ical Tanjung
2006 (26th)	Love for Share	Ipung Rachmat Syaiful
2006 (26th)	Opera Jawa	Teoh Gay Hian
2006 (26th)	Room	Arief R. Pribadi
2007 (27th)	Dead Time: Kala	Ipung Rachmat Syaiful ‡
2007 (27th)	Get Married	Faozan Rizal
2007 (27th)	Nagabonar Jadi 2	Yudi Datau
2007 (27th)	Red Love	Sidi Saleh
2007 (27th)	Sang Dewi	Regita Anindhita
2008 (28th)	May	Ical Tanjung ‡
2008 (28th)	The Butterfly	Nayato Fio Nuala
2008 (28th)	Fiksi.	Yunus Pasolang
2008 (28th)	Radit dan Jani	Ical Tanjung
2008 (28th)	Under the Tree	Yadi Sugandi
2009 (29th)	The Forbidden Door	Ipung Rachmat Syaiful ‡
2009 (29th)	Identitas	Yatsky
2009 (29th)	Ruma Maida	Ical Tanjung
2009 (29th)	Serigala Terakhir	Ical Tanjung
2009 (29th)	Woman with a Turban	Faozan Rizal

=== 2010s ===
Year	Film	Nominee(s)
2010 (30th)	I Know What You Did on Facebook	Robby Herby ‡
2010 (30th)	3 Hati Dua Dunia, Satu Cinta	Roy Lolang
2010 (30th)	Heart-break.com	Suadi Utama
2010 (30th)	How Funny (This Country Is)	Yudi Datau
2010 (30th)	Sunday Morning in Victoria Park	Yadi Sugandi
2011 (31st)	?	Yadi Sugandi ‡
2011 (31st)	The Dancer	Yadi Sugandi
2011 (31st)	Masih Bukan Cinta Biasa	Gunung Nusa Pelita
2011 (31st)	The Mirror Never Lies	Ipung Rachmat Syaiful
2011 (31st)	Pengejar Angin	Faozan Rizal
2012 (32nd)	Dilema	Yudi Datau ‡
2012 (32nd)	Hello Goodbye	Yunus Pasolang
2012 (32nd)	Paper Boat	Faozan Rizal
2012 (32nd)	Rumah di Seribu Ombak	Padri Nadeak
2012 (32nd)	Tanah Surga... Katanya	Anggi Frisca
2013 (33rd)	5 cm	Yudi Datau‡
2013 (33rd)	Habibie & Ainun	Ipung Rachmat Syaiful
2013 (33rd)	Laura & Marsha	Roy Lolang
2013 (33rd)	Madre	Fahmy J. Saad
2013 (33rd)	Shackled	Ical Tanjung
2014 (34th)	Before the Morning Repeated	Nur Hidayat ‡
2014 (34th)	3 Nafas Likas	Hani Pradigya
2014 (34th)	Lights from the East: I Am Maluku	Robie Taswin
2014 (34th)	Sepatu Dahlan	Rendra Yusworo
2014 (34th)	Soekarno	Faozan Rizal
2015 (35th)	Guru Bangsa: Tjokroaminoto	Ipung Rachmat Syaiful ‡
2015 (35th)	Behind 98	Yadi Sugandi and Muhammad Firdaus
2015 (35th)	A Copy of My Mind	Ical Tanjung
2015 (35th)	Siti	Fauzi "Ujel" Bausadi
2015 (35th)	Supernova: The Knight, the Princess & Shooting Star	Yudi Datau
2016 (36th)	Salawaku	Faozan Rizal ‡
2016 (36th)	3 Heroines	Ipung Rachmat Syaiful
2016 (36th)	Aisyah: Biarkan Kami Bersaudara	Edi Santoso
2016 (36th)	Athirah	Yadi Sugandi
2016 (36th)	Letters from Prague	Ivan Anwal Pane
2017 (37th)	Satan's Slaves	Ical Tanjung ‡
2017 (37th)	Galih & Ratna	Amalia T. S.
2017 (37th)	Kartini	Faozan Rizal
2017 (37th)	Night Bus	Anggi Frisca
2017 (37th)	Posesif	Batara Goempar
2018 (38th)	Marlina the Murderer in Four Acts	Yunus Pasolang ‡
2018 (38th)	212 Warrior	Ipung Rachmat Syaiful
2018 (38th)	May the Devil Take You	Batara Goempar
2018 (38th)	The Seen and Unseen	Anggi Frisca
2018 (38th)	Wage	Hani Pradigya
2019 (39th)	Gundala	Ical Tanjung ‡
2019 (39th)	Ambu	Yudi Datau
2019 (39th)	Ave Maryam	Ical Tanjung
2019 (39th)	My Stupid Boss 2	Arfian
2019 (39th)	Two Blue Stripes	Padri Nadeak

=== 2020s ===
Year	Film	Nominee(s)
2020 (40th)	Impetigore	Ical Tanjung ‡
2020 (40th)	Abracadabra	Gandang Warah
2020 (40th)	Homecoming	Vera Lestafa
2020 (40th)	Humba Dreams	Bayu Prihantoro
2020 (40th)	Mountain Song	Ujel Bausad
2020 (40th)	Susi Susanti: Love All	Yunus Pasolang
2021 (41st)	Photocopier	Gunnar Nimpuno ‡
2021 (41st)	Ali & Ratu Ratu Queens	Batara Goempar
2021 (41st)	Bete's Love	Roy Lolang
2021 (41st)	Layla Majnun	Anggi Frisca
2021 (41st)	Nona	Yudi Datau
2022 (42nd)	Before, Now & Then	Batara Goempar ‡
2022 (42nd)	Kadet 1947	Batara Goempar
2022 (42nd)	Losmen Bu Broto	Muhammad Firdaus
2022 (42nd)	Satan's Slaves 2: Communion	Ical Tanjung
2022 (42nd)	Stealing Raden Saleh	Bagoes Tresna Adji
2023 (43rd)	Women from Rote Island	Joseph Christoforus Fofid ‡
2023 (43rd)	Andragogy	Gunnar Nimpuno
2023 (43rd)	The Big 4	Batara Goempar
2023 (43rd)	Buya Hamka Vol. 1	Ipung Rachmat Syaiful
2023 (43rd)	Like & Share	Deska Binarso
2024 (44th)	Samsara	Batara Goempar ‡
2024 (44th)	13 Bombs in Jakarta	Arnand Pratikto
2024 (44th)	Borderless Fog	Gunnar Nimpuno
2024 (44th)	Grave Torture	Ical Tanjung
2024 (44th)	Heartbreak Motel	Arnand Pratikto
2025 (45th)	The Siege at Thorn High	Ical Tanjung‡
2025 (45th)	The Shadow Strays	Batara Goempar
2025 (45th)	Siapa Dia	Muhammad Firdaus
2025 (45th)	Sore: Wife from the Future	Dimas Bagus Triatma
2025 (45th)	This City Is a Battlefield	Roy Lolang

== Multiple awards and nominations ==
=== Awards ===
4 wins

- Ical Tanjung
- Ipung Rachmat Syaiful
- Lukman Hakim Nain
- Sjamsuddin Jusuf
- Yudi Datau

3 wins

- Akin
- George Kamarullah
- Soetomo Gandasoebrata

2 wins

- Batara Goempar
- M. Soleh Ruslani
- Tantra Surjadi

=== Nominations ===
13 nominations

- Ical Tanjung

11 nominations

- Ipung Rachmat Syaiful
- Yudi Datau

9 nominations

- M. Soleh Ruslani

7 nominations

- Batara Goempar
- Faozan Rizal
- Tantra Surjadi
- Yadi Sugandi

5 nominations

- Harry Simon

4 nominations

- Adrian Susanto
- Akin
- Anggi Frisca
- George Kamarullah
- Harry Susanto
- Lukman Hakim Nain
- Roy Lolang
- Soetomo Gandasoebrata
- Yunus Pasolang

3 nominations

- F. E. S. Tarigan
- Gunnar Nimpuno

2 nominations

- Arnand Pratikto
- Hani Pradigya
- Hasan Basri Jafar
- Muhammad Firdaus
- Padri Nadeak
- Tommy Jepang
- Ujel Bausad
