= 37th Festival Film Bandung =

2024 film and television awards

- Presented by: Forum Film Bandung
- Date: 9 November 2024
- Site: Gedung Budaya Sabilulungan, Soreang, Bandung Regency, West Java, Indonesia
- Official website: festivalfilmbandung.com

Highlights
- Best Picture: Harlot's Prayer

The 37th Festival Film Bandung, presented by the Forum Film Bandung, honored the achievements in Indonesian film and television industry from 1 September 2023 to 31 August 2024. The ceremony was held on 9 November 2024 at the Gedung Budaya Sabilulungan, Soreang, Bandung Regency, West Java, Indonesia.

Drama film Harlot's Prayer won the Highly Commended Film. Netflix period romantic drama series Cigarette Girl won the Highly Commended Web Series.

== Winners and nominees ==
The nominations were announced on 26 September 2024.

Winners are listed first, highlighted in boldface, and indicated with a double dagger (‡).

=== Film ===
**Highly Commended Film**: **Harlot's Prayer**‡; Andragogy; Falling in Love Like in Movies; Petualangan Sherina 2; Rumah Masa Depan; Two Blue Hearts	**Highly Commended Director**: **Riri Riza – Petualangan Sherina 2**‡; Hanung Bramantyo – Ipar Adalah Maut; Upi – Till Death Do Us Part; Wregas Bhanuteja – Andragogy; Yandy Laurens – Falling in Love Like in Movies
**Highly Commended Leading Actor**: **Angga Yunanda – Two Blue Hearts as Bima**‡; Deva Mahenra – Ipar Adalah Maut as Aris; Donny Damara – Harlot's Prayer as Tomo; Nicholas Saputra – The Architecture of Love as River; Ringgo Agus Rahman – Falling in Love Like in Movies as Bagus	**Highly Commended Leading Actress**: **Aghniny Haque – Harlot's Prayer as Kiran**‡; Faradina Mufti – Grave Torture as Sita; Laura Basuki – Heartbreak Motel as Ava; Michelle Ziudith – Ipar Adalah Maut as Anisa; Nirina Zubir – Falling in Love Like in Movies as Hana
**Highly Commended Supporting Actor**: **Slamet Rahardjo – Grave Torture as Ilham Sutisna/Wahyu Sutama**‡; Danang Suryonegoro – Gampang Cuan as Evan; Farrell Rafisqy – Two Blue Hearts as Adam; Jerome Kurnia – The Architecture of Love as Aga; Yoga Pratama – Borderless Fog as Thomas	**Highly Commended Supporting Actress**: **Asmara Abigail – Till Death Do Us Part as Asmara**‡; Davina Karamoy – Ipar Adalah Maut as Rani; Isyana Sarasvati – Petualangan Sherina 2 as Ratih; Meriam Bellina – Gampang Cuan as Diah; Widyawati – Rumah Masa Depan as Kokom
**Highly Commended Screenplay**: **Rumah Masa Depan – Danial Rifki**‡; Agak Laen – Muhadkly Acho; Andragogy – Wregas Bhanuteja; Gampang Cuan – Rahabi Mandra and Syahrun Ramadhan; Harlot's Prayer – Ifan Ismail and Hanung Bramantyo	**Highly Commended Cinematography**: **Petualangan Sherina 2 – Yadi Sugandi**‡; Borderless Fog – Gunnar Nimpuno; Falling in Love Like in Movies – Dimas Bagus Triatma Yoga; Grave Torture – Ical Tanjung; Harlot's Prayer – Satria Kurnianto
**Highly Commended Art Direction**: **How to Survive a Marriage? – Allan Sebastian**‡; Andragogy – Dita Gambiro; Borderless Fog – Menfo Tantono and Guntur Mupak; Harlot's Prayer – Edy Wibowo; Heartbreak Motel – Adrianto Sinaga	**Highly Commended Editing**: **Andragogy – Ahmad Yuniardi**‡; 24 Hours with Gaspar – Akhmad Fesdi Anggoro; Ipar Adalah Maut – Wawan I. Wibowo; Petualangan Sherina 2 – Aline Jusria; Two Blue Hearts – Aline Jusria and Sastha Sunu
**Highly Commended Original Score**: **Petualangan Sherina 2 – Sherina Munaf**‡; Air Mata di Ujung Sajadah – Andi Rianto; The Architecture of Love – Ricky Lionardi; Heartbreak Motel – Abel Huray; Rumah Masa Depan – Andhika Triyadi	**Highly Commended International Film**: Highly Commended Action Film: Deadpool & Wolverine; Highly Commended Horror Film: Exhuma; Highly Commended Comedy Film: The Holdovers; Highly Commended Animation Film: Inside Out 2; Highly Commended Crime Drama Film: Killers of the Flower Moon; Highly Commended Teen Film: Not Friends; Highly Commended Biographical Film: Sound of Freedom; Highly Commended Motivational Comedy Film: YOLO; Highly Commended War Drama Film: The Zone of Interest

=== Television and Web ===
**Highly Commended Web Series**: **Cigarette Girl (Netflix)**‡; CinLock: Love, Camera, Action! (Vision+); Ellyas Pical (Prime Video); Ratu Adil (Vidio); Tira (Disney+ Hotstar)	**Highly Commended Director for a Web Series**: **Ifa Isfansyah and Kamila Andini – Cigarette Girl (Netflix)**‡; Herwin Novianto – Ellyas Pical (Prime Video); Sabrina Rochelle Kalangie – 90 Hari Mencari Suami (Prime Video); Surya Ardy Octaviand – Pay Later (Vision+); Tommy Dewo and Ginanti Rona – Ratu Adil (Vidio)
**Highly Commended Leading Actor in a Web Series**: **Maxime Bouttier – The Perfect Strangers as Liam (Vidio)**‡; Ario Bayu – Cigarette Girl as Raja (Netflix); Denny Sumargo – Ellyas Pical as Ellyas Pical (Prime Video); Emir Mahira – Happy Birth-Die as Heksa (Vidio); Teuku Rifnu Wikana – Cinta Pertama Ayah as Darma (Vidio)	**Highly Commended Leading Actress in a Web Series**: **Hannah Al Rashid – The Talent Agency as Amel (Disney+ Hotstar)**‡; Amanda Manopo – Pay Later as Tika (Vision+); Dian Sastrowardoyo – Ratu Adil as Lasja (Vidio); Megan Domani – Pernikahan Dini as Dini (Disney+ Hotstar); Tissa Biani – CinLock: Love, Camera, Action! as Lala (Vision+)
**Highly Commended Actor in a Television Series**: **Rey Bong – Saleha as Bara (SCTV)**‡; **Teddy Syach – Saleha as Darmawan (SCTV)**‡; Marcellino Lefrandt – Keabadian as Harjo and Tejo (Indosiar); Naufal Samudra – Seindah Cinta Mutiara as Daffa (RCTI); Omara Esteghlal – Mengejar Maghrib as Maghrib (RCTI)	**Highly Commended Actress in a Television Series**: **Ayu Azhari – Keabadian as Ratna (Indosiar)**‡; Angela Gilsha – Cinta Berakhir Bahagia as Adisty (RCTI); Esta Pramanita – My Heart as Raisa (SCTV); Lesti Kejora – Aku Mencintaimu Karena Allah as Arsy (RCTI); Naysila Mirdad – Tertawan Hati as Alya and Alyssa (SCTV)
**Highly Commended Supporting Actor in a Web Series**: **Arya Saloka – Cigarette Girl as Lebas (Netflix)**‡; **Jeremie J. Tobing – Tira as Haikal (Disney+ Hotstar)**‡; Fattah Syach – Private Bodyguard as Jordan (Viu); Oka Antara – 90 Hari Mencari Suami as Dewa (Prime Video); Yoshi Sudarso – Wedding Agreement the Series as Salman (Disney+ Hotstar)	**Highly Commended Supporting Actress in a Web Series**: **Sita Nursanti – Joko Anwar's Nightmares and Daydreams as Dewi (Netflix)**‡; Ersa Mayori – Cinta Pertama Ayah as Nabila (Vidio); Gita Bhebhita – Induk Gajah as Mona (Prime Video); Karina Suwandi – Tira as Widya (Disney+ Hotstar); Lydia Kandou – The Talent Agency as Lydia (Disney+ Hotstar)

=== Special awards ===
- Lifetime Achievement Award: Eros Djarot
- Best Child Performer: Farrell Rafisqy for Two Blue Hearts
- Best Documentary Film: The Exiles
