= Batara Goempar =

Indonesian cinematographer (born 1985)

- Born: Batara Goempar Siagian; 4 April 1985 (age 41); Jakarta, Indonesia
- Occupation: Cinematographer
- Years active: 2005–present

Batara Goempar (born 4 April 1985) is an Indonesian cinematographer. He has received seven Citra Award for Best Cinematography nominations, winning two for Before, Now & Then (2022) and Samsara (2024). He also won the Asia Pacific Screen Award for the latter.

== Career ==
Goempar started his career as a cinematographer in 2005 and graduated from Institut Kesenian Jakarta in 2009, majoring in Cinematography. In 2016, he was selected to participate at the Berlinale Talents. He has collaborated with various directors, including Kamila Andini, Garin Nugroho, Timo Tjahjanto, and Lucky Kuswandi.

He is a member of Indonesian Cinematographers Society.

== Filmography ==
Goempar was a cinematographer in all films unless otherwise noted.

=== Film ===
Year	Title	Director	Notes
2007	D'Bijis	Rako Prijanto	First assistant camera
2009	Titik Nol	Nicholas Yudifar	Short film Also as writer
2009	The Good News	Nicholas Yudifar	Short film
2009	Kawin Laris	Cassandra Massardi	First assistant camera
2010	Menembus Impian	Hanung Bramantyo	Assistant camera
2010	Sang Pencerah	Hanung Bramantyo	Second assistant camera
2011	A Kick from the Sky	Hanung Bramantyo	Camera operator
2011	Pengejar Angin	Hanung Bramantyo	Camera operator
2012	Hi5teria	Nicholas Yudifar	Segment: "Palasik"
2012	Cinta Tapi Beda	Hanung Bramantyo, Hestu Saputra	
2012	An Angel Without Wings	Rako Prijanto	Assistant camera
2012	Bring Me the Moon, Mom	Ifa Isfansyah	First assistant camera
2012	Paper Boat	Hanung Bramantyo	Camera operator
2012	Paper Boat 2	Hanung Bramantyo	Camera operator
2013	The Clerics	Rako Prijanto	Camera operator
2013	Pohon Penghujan	Andra Fembriarto	Short film
2014	Aroma of Heaven	Budi Kurniawan	
2014	Merry Riana: Mimpi Sejuta Dolar	Hestu Saputra	
2016	Chaotic Love Poems	Garin Nugroho	
2017	At Stake	Krishto Damar Alam	Camera operator
2017	Posesif	Edwin	
2018	The Night Comes for Us	Timo Tjahjanto	Second Unit Director of Photography
2018	May the Devil Take You	Timo Tjahjanto	
2019	Portals	Timo Tjahjanto	Segment: "Sarah"
2020	Hunter in the Blue Side of Manchester	Rako Prijanto	
2021	Ali & Ratu Ratu Queens	Lucky Kuswandi	
2021	Kadet 1947	Rahabi Mandra, Aldo Swastia	
2022	Before, Now & Then	Kamila Andini	
2022	Perfect Strangers	Rako Prijanto	
2022	The Big 4	Timo Tjahjanto	
2023	Monster	Rako Prijanto	
2024	Samsara	Garin Nugroho	Also co-producer
2024	The Shadow Strays	Timo Tjahjanto	
2025	Sammi, Who Can Detach His Body Parts	Rein Maychaelson	Short film
2025	A Normal Woman	Lucky Kuswandi	
2026	Four Seasons in Java	Kamila Andini	
2026	The Sea Speaks His Name	Yosep Anggi Noen	

=== Television ===
Year	Title	Director	Notes
2020–2022	Pretty Little Liars	Emil Heradi	
2023	Cigarette Girl	Kamila Andini, Ifa Isfansyah	

== Awards and nominations ==
Citra Awards

Year	Title	Category	Result	Ref.
2017	Posesif	Best Cinematography	Nominated	
2018	May the Devil Take You	Best Cinematography	Nominated	
2021	Ali & Ratu Ratu Queens	Best Cinematography	Nominated	
2022	Before, Now & Then	Best Cinematography	Won	
2022	Kadet 1947	Best Cinematography	Nominated	
2023	The Big 4	Best Cinematography	Nominated	
2024	Samsara	Best Cinematography	Won	
2025	The Shadow Strays	Best Cinematography	Nominated	

Asia Pacific Screen Awards

Year	Title	Category	Result	Ref.
2022	Before, Now & Then	Best Cinematography	Nominated	
2025	Samsara	Best Cinematography	Won	
2026	Four Seasons in Java	Best Cinematography	Pending	

Maya Awards

Year	Title	Category	Result	Ref.
2017	Posesif	Best Cinematography	Nominated	
2018	May the Devil Take You	Best Cinematography	Nominated	
2021	Ali & Ratu Ratu Queens	Best Cinematography	Nominated	
2022	Before, Now & Then	Best Cinematography	Won	

Other awards

Year	Title	Award	Category	Result	Ref.
2017	Posesif	Indonesian Screen Awards	Best Cinematography	Won	
2023	Before, Now & Then	Asian Film Awards	Best Cinematography	Nominated	
2025	Sammi, Who Can Detach His Body Parts	Singapore International Film Festival	Best Cinematography	Won	
