= 18th Asia Pacific Screen Awards =

Film awards ceremony 2025 edition

- Awarded for: Excellence in cinema and performance in Asia Pacific region
- Awarded by: Asia Pacific Screen Academy
- Presented by: UNESCO; FIAPF
- Date: 27 November 2025
- Site: The Langham, Jewel Private Residence, Gold Coast, Australia
- Official website: asiapacificscreenawards.com

Highlights
- Best Film: It Was Just an Accident

The 18th Asia Pacific Screen Awards, presented by UNESCO, FIAPF (International Federation of Film Producers Associations) and the Brisbane City Council, in partnership with APSA and Jewel Private Residences took place on 27 November 2025 at The Langham, and Jewel Private Residences, Gold Coast, Queensland, Australia, to recognize the best in cinema of the Asia Pacific Region of 2025.

The nominations were announced on 15 October 2025. Nomination were invited in four categories: Feature Film, Animated Feature Film, Youth Feature Film and Documentary Feature Film.

== Winners and nominees ==
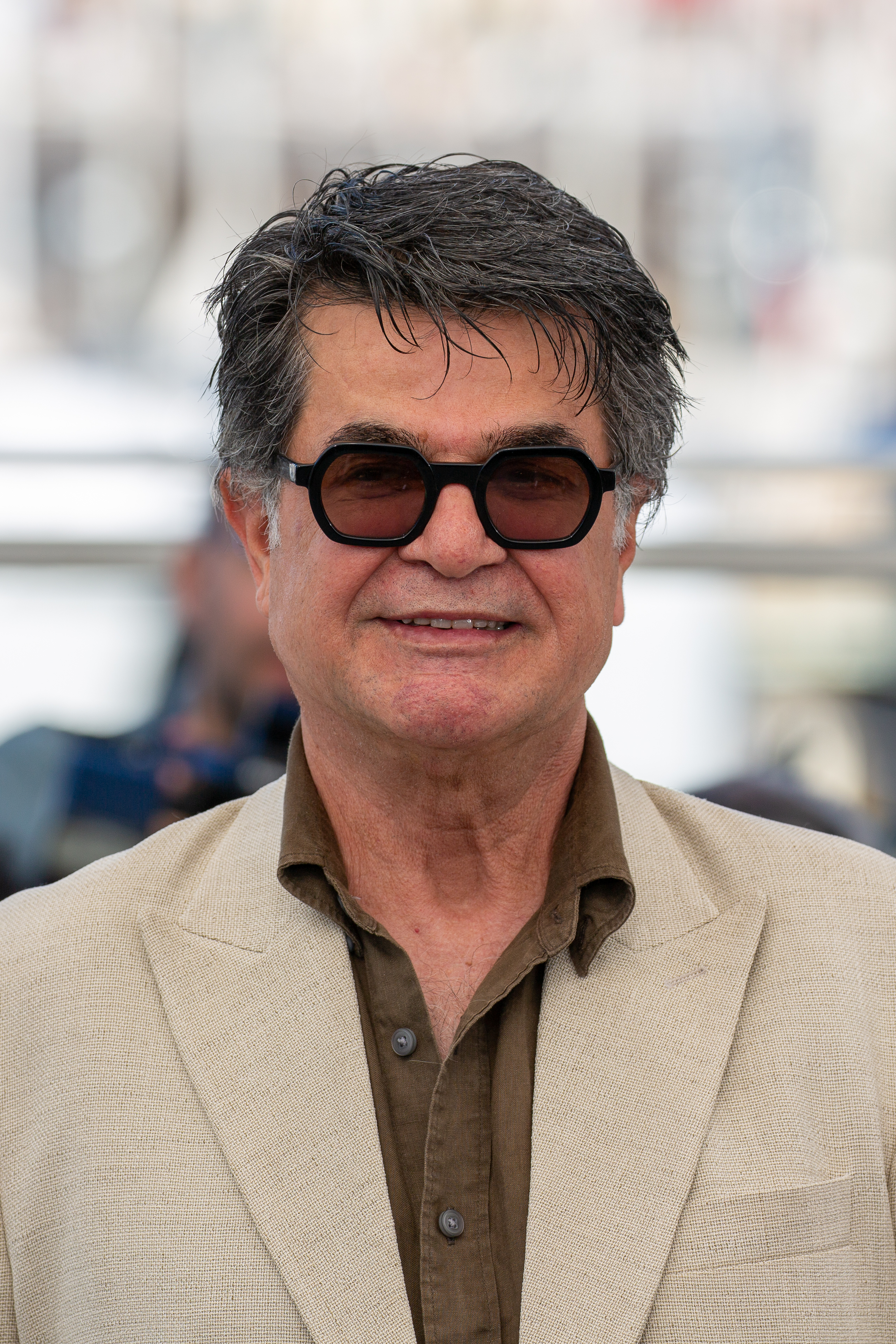
Jafar Panahi winner of the Best Director Award

The nominations were announced on 15 October 2025.

Winners are listed first and highlighted in boldface.

**Best Film**: **It Was Just an Accident ( (Iran) (Luxembourg) (France) )** **Directed by Jafar Panahi** **Produced by Jafar Panahi, Philippe Martin**; Magellan ( (France) (Portugal) (Spain) (Philippines) (Taiwan) ) Directed by Lav Diaz Produced by Joaquim Sapinho, Marta Alves, Albert Serra, Montse Triola, Paul Soriano, Mark Victor; Samsara ( (Indonesia) ) Directed by Garin Nugroho Produced by Gita Fara; The Sun Rises on Us All ( (China) ) Directed by Cai Shangjun Produced by Ma Shuang, Huang Titi, Justine O.; Two Seasons, Two Strangers ( (Japan) ) Directed by Sho Miyake Produced by Masayoshi Johnai	**Best Director**: **Jafar Panahi – It Was Just an Accident**; Amir Azizi – Inside Amir; Akio Fujimoto – Lost Land; Garin Nugroho – Samsara; Sengedorj Janchivdorj – Silent City Driver
**Best Performance**: **Sean Lau – Papa**; Khairiah Nathmy – Hijra; Xin Zhilei – The Sun Rises on Us All; Ariel Bronz – Yes; Georges Khabbaz – Yunan	**Best Youth Film**: **Amoeba ( (Singapore) (Netherlands) (France) (Spain) (South Korea) )** **Directed by Tan Siyou** **Produced by Fran Borgia**; Before the Bright Day ( (Taiwan) ) Directed by Tsao Shih-Han Produced by Lin Shih-Ken; The President's Cake ( (Iraq) (United States) (Qatar) ) Directed by Hasan Hadi Produced by Leah Chen Baker; Village Rockstars 2 ( (India) (Singapore) ) Directed and produced by Rima Das; The World of Love ( (South Korea) ) Directed by Yoon Ga-eun Produced by Kim Se-hun, Jenna Ku
**Best Animated Film**: **The Square ( (South Korea) )** **Directed by Kim Bo-sol** **Produced by Park So-hye, Kim Bo-sol**; Another World ( (Hong Kong) ) Directed by Tommy Ng Kai Chung Produced by Polly Yeung, Chan Gin Kai; ChaO ( (Japan) ) Directed by Yasuhiro Aoki Produced by Eiko Tanaka; The Lost Tiger ( (Australia) ) Directed by Chantelle Murray Produced by Kristen Souvlis, Nadine Bates, Chantelle Murray; A Story About Fire ( (China) ) Directed by Wenyu Li Produced by Chen Bo, Wang Anyi	**Best Documentary Film**: **Put Your Soul on Your Hand and Walk ( (France) (Palestine) )** **Directed by Sepideh Farsi** **Produced by Javad Djavahery**; Always ( (United States) (France) (China) (Taiwan) ) Directed by Deming Chen Produced by Hansen Lin (Special Mention); 10s Across the Borders ( (Philippines) (Singapore) (Germany) ) Directed by Chan Sze-Wei Produced by Alemberg Ang, Chan Sze-Wei, Tan Si En, Yasmin C. Rams, Sophia Sim; We Live Here ( (Kazakhstan) ) Directed by Zhanana Kurmasheva Produced by Banu Ramazanova; Writing Hawa ( (France) (Netherlands) (Qatar) (Afghanistan) ) Directed by Najiba Noori Produced by Christian Popp
**Best Screenplay**: **Chie Hayakawa – Renoir**; Shu Qi – Girl; Nawapol Thamrongrattanarit – Human Resource; Annemarie Jacir – Palestine 36; Kaouther Ben Hania – The Voice of Hind Rajab	**Best Cinematography**: **Batara Goempar – Samsara**; Artur Tort, Lav Diaz – Magellan; Prabhath Roshan – Riverstone; Yuta Tsukinaga – Two Seasons, Two Strangers; Ronald Plante – Yunan
**Best New Performer**: **Yui Suzuki – Renoir**	**Jury Grand Prize**: **Lost Land ( (Japan) (France) (Malaysia) (Germany) )** **Directed by Akio Fujimoto** **Produced by Kazutaka Watanabe**
**Young Cinema Award**: **Rohan Parashuram Kanawade – Sabar Bonda**	**FIAPF Award**: **Greer Simpkin**
**Cultural Diversity Award**: **Black Red Yellow ( (Kyrgyzstan) )** **Directed and produced by Aktan Arym Kubat**
