= Mandy Marahimin =

Indonesian film producer

- Born: Amanda Marahimin
- Occupations: Film producer; film publicist
- Years active: 1999–present

Mandy Marahimin is an Indonesian film producer. In 2013, she co-founded a production company Talamedia (formerly known as Tanakhir Films), alongside actor Nicholas Saputra. She won the Citra Award for Best Live Action Short Film for producing Tumpal Tampubolon's short film The Sea Calls for Me at the 2021 ceremony.

== Career ==
Marahimin graduated from University of Indonesia, majoring in communication studies. She began her career in the film industry in 1999 by organizing filmmaking workshops with Yayasan PopCorner Indonesia, where she met producer Mira Lesmana. She later worked as a film publicist on Petualangan Sherina and What's Up with Love?, both produced under Lesmana's production company Miles Films. In 2007, she served as a line producer on Riri Riza's 3 Days to Forever. In 2012, she founded Wujudkan, a crowdfunding website for Indonesian artists and creators.

In 2013, she co-founded a production company Talamedia (formerly known as Tanakhir Films) with actor Nicholas Saputra. The company's first film, Cinta dari Wamena, which tackles the issue of HIV/AIDS in Papua, was released in Indonesian theatres on 13 June 2013. She produced Chairun Nissa's feature documentary film, Islands of Faith. It was nominated for Best Documentary Feature at the 2018 Indonesian Film Festival. In 2021, she produced Tumpal Tampubolon's short film The Sea Calls for Me. It won the Citra Award for Best Live Action Short Film. She served as a jury for the Mecenat Award at the 26th Busan International Film Festival.

In 2023, she produced documentary film One Big Sumba Family, which follows the life of a man with twelve wives and hundreds grandchildren. It was nominated for Best Documentary Feature at the 2023 Indonesian Film Festival. In the same year, she co-produced Ena Sendijarević's drama film Sweet Dreams. It had its world premiere at the 76th Locarno Film Festival and was selected as Dutch entry in Best International Feature Film category for the 96th Academy Awards.

In 2024, she was selected as one of the Producers Under the Spotlight in Marché du Film along with four other Indonesian producers, Yulia Evina Bhara, Ifa Isfansyah, Gita Fara, and Muhammad Zaidy. She produced Tampubolon's directorial debut feature film Crocodile Tears, which had its world premiere at the 2024 Toronto International Film Festival. It received five nominations at the 2024 Indonesian Film Festival, including Best Picture. In 2025, she co-produced Yihwen Chen's documentary film Queer as Punk, which follows Shh...Diam!, Malaysian queer punk band. It had its world premiere at the 75th Berlin International Film Festival.

== Filmography ==
Marahimin was a producer in all films unless otherwise noted.

Year	Film	Credit
2000	Petualangan Sherina	Film publicist
2002	What's Up with Love?	Film publicist
2002	Eliana, Eliana	Film publicist
2005	Gie	Production coordinator
2006	Garasi	Film publicist
2007	Three Days to Forever	Line producer
2008	Takut: Faces of Fear	Segment: "Titisan Naya"; Line producer
2013	Cinta dari Wamena	
2016	Ada Apa Dengan Cinta? 2	Associate producer
2018	Islands of Faith	
2023	One Big Sumba Family	
2023	Sweet Dreams	Co-producer
2023	Petualangan Sherina 2	Co-producer
2024	Crocodile Tears	
2025	Queer as Punk	Co-producer

Short films

Year	Film	Credit
2007	Tak Kau Kunanti	Line producer
2011	No One Is Illegal	
2015	Rock N Roll	
2015	Rojer	
2016	Save Our Forest Giants	
2017	A Man with 12 Wives	
2019	Women of Sumba Land	
2020	The Woven Path	
2021	The Sea Calls for Me	
