= Till Death Do Us Part (2024 film) =

2024 thriller film

- Theatrical release poster
- Directed by: Upi Avianto
- Screenplay by: Upi Avianto
- Produced by: Chand Parwez Servia; Riza
- Starring: Laura Basuki; Ario Bayu; Asmara Abigail
- Cinematography: Yunus Pasolang
- Edited by: Teguh Raharjo
- Music by: Ricky Lionardi
- Production company: Starvision
- Release date: 11 January 2024
- Running time: 108 minutes
- Country: Indonesia
- Language: Indonesian

Till Death Do Us Part (Indonesian: Sehidup Semati) is a 2024 Indonesian thriller film directed and written by Upi Avianto. It stars Laura Basuki, Ario Bayu, and Asmara Abigail. The film was released in Indonesian theatres on 11 January 2024.

== Premise ==
A devout housewife is determined to save their marriage and maintain her home after her abusive husband cheats on her.

== Cast ==
- Laura Basuki as Renata
- Ario Bayu as Edwin
- Asmara Abigail as Asmara
- Chantiq Schagerl as Ana
- Maya Hasan as Renata's mother
- Lukman Sardi as Priest

== Production ==
During the film's press conference, Upi Avianto revealed that she had written the screenplay thirteen years prior.

== Release ==
Till Death Do Us Part was released in Indonesian cinema on 11 January 2024. It garnered 127,057 admission during its theatrical run.

Netflix acquired its distribution, releasing the director's cut version on 24 June 2024. The film was also released on Vidio on 25 July 2026.

== Accolades ==
Award / Film Festival	Date of ceremony	Category	Recipient(s)	Result	Ref.
Festival Film Bandung	9 November 2024	Highly Commended Director	Upi	Nominated	
Festival Film Bandung	9 November 2024	Highly Commended Supporting Actress	Asmara Abigail	Won	
Indonesian Film Festival	20 November 2024	Best Supporting Actress	Asmara Abigail	Nominated	
