= The Sea Speaks His Name =

2026 political drama film by Yosep Anggi Noen

- Poster
- Indonesian: Laut Bercerita
- Directed by: Yosep Anggi Noen
- Written by: Yosep Anggi Noen; Leila S. Chudori
- Based on: The Sea Speaks His Name by Leila S. Chudori
- Produced by: Gita Fara; Budi Setyarso; Leila S. Chudori
- Starring: Reza Rahadian
- Cinematography: Batara Goempar
- Edited by: Dinda Amanda
- Production companies: Pal8 Pictures; VMS Studio; Jagartha; Lynx Films
- Release dates: 11 October 2026 (Busan); 29 October 2026
- Running time: 120 minutes
- Country: Indonesia
- Language: Indonesian

The Sea Speaks His Name (Indonesian: Laut Bercerita) is a 2026 Indonesian political drama film directed by Yosep Anggi Noen. It is based on the 2017 novel of the same name by Leila S. Chudori. She also co-wrote the screenplay with Noen. The film stars Reza Rahadian as Biru Laut.

The film will have its world premiere and compete in the Competition section of the 31st Busan International Film Festival on October 11, 2026 for 'Busan Awards'. The film was released on 29 October 2026 in Indonesian theatres.

== Premise ==
Set in the final years of New Order authoritarian regime, Biru Laut, a student activist, disappears mysteriously. The Sea Speaks His Name follows the search by his family for him and other missing student activists.

== Cast ==
- Reza Rahadian as Biru Laut
- Yunita Siregar as Asmara Jati
- Dian Sastrowardoyo as Kasih Kinanti
- Eva Celia as Ratih Anjani
- Christine Hakim as Mrs. Wibisana
- Arswendy Bening Swara as Arya Wibisana
- Kevin Julio as Daniel Tumbuan
- Ben Nugroho as Alex Perazon
- Dewa Dayana as Sunu Dyantoro
- Yoga Pratama as Arifin Bramantyo
- Nagra Pakusadewo as Naratama
- Natalius Chendana as Julius
- Afrian Arisandy as Gala Pranaya

== Production ==
In June 2025, Indonesian publication Tempo launched a production company Pal8 Pictures, intending to highlight political stories in films. During the 2025 JAFF Market, Pal8 Pictures announced that they had optioned the novel The Sea Speaks His Name by Leila S. Chudori, with Yosep Anggi Noen attached to direct. It was also announced that Reza Rahadian, Yunita Siregar, Dian Sastrowardoyo, Eva Celia, Christine Hakim, and Arswendy Bening Swara joined the cast. This is the second adaptation of the book since the 2017 short film directed by Pritagita Arianegara, which was released on the same day as the book launch. Rahadian was set to reprise his role as Biru Laut, a character he also played in the short film. Sastrowardoyo, who played Ratih Anjani in the short film, would portray Kasih Kinanti in the feature film. In February 2026, it was reported that Kevin Julio, Ben Nugroho, Dewa Dayana, Yoga Pratama, Nagra Pakusadewo, Natalius Chendana, and Afrian Arisandy had joined the cast. In March 2026, the project participated at the HKIFF Industry Project Market. It won the HAF WIP Award and received $12,800 grant. It was also selected to be presented at the Marché du Film under the HAF Goes to Cannes Programme.

Principal photography took place in Semarang, Salatiga, Sukabumi, and Jakarta.

== Release ==
The Sea Speaks His Name will have its World Premiere in the Competition section of the 31st Busan International Film Festival on 11 October 2026 and vie for 'Busan Awards'.

It is scheduled to be released theatrically in Indonesia on 29 October 2026.

== Accolades ==
The film competed for various Vision Awards at Busan International Film Festival.

Award	Date of ceremony	Category	Recipient(s)	Result	Ref.
Busan International Film Festival	15 October 2026	Busan Awards: Best Film	The Sea Speaks His Name	Nominated	
