= Goodbye, Farewell =

2024 drama film

- Poster
- Directed by: Adriyanto Dewo
- Screenplay by: Adriyanto Dewo
- Produced by: Perlita Desiani; Shierly Kosasih
- Starring: Putri Marino; Jerome Kurnia; Jourdy Pranata; Lutesha; Kiki Narendra
- Cinematography: Dimas Bagus
- Edited by: Arifin Cu'unk
- Music by: Lie Indra Perkasa
- Production companies: Adhya Pictures; Relate Films
- Release date: 23 October 2024 (Jakarta)
- Running time: 109 minutes
- Country: Indonesia
- Language: Indonesian

Goodbye, Farewell (Indonesian: Sampai Jumpa, Selamat Tinggal) is a 2024 Indonesian romantic drama film directed and written by Adriyanto Dewo. The film stars Jerome Kurnia, Putri Marino, Jourdy Pranata, Lutesha, and Kiki Narendra. Lutesha received a nomination for Best Supporting Actress at the 2024 Indonesian Film Festival.

It had its world premiere as the opening film of 2024 Jakarta Film Week.

== Premise ==
A woman embarks on a journey to find her boyfriend in Seoul and, along the way, meets an Indonesian worker.

== Cast ==
- Putri Marino as Wyn
- Jerome Kurnia as Rey
- Jourdy Pranata as Dani
- Lutesha as Vanya
- Kiki Narendra as Anto

== Production ==
Principal photography took place in Seoul, South Korea, from August to September 2023.

== Release ==
Goodbye, Farewell had its world premiere as the opening film at the 2024 Jakarta Film Week on 23 October 2024. The film competed for Indonesian Screen Awards at the 19th Jogja-NETPAC Asian Film Festival. It was released in Indonesian theatres on 5 June 2025.

== Accolades ==
Award / Film Festival	Date of ceremony	Category	Recipient(s)	Result	Ref.
Indonesian Film Festival	20 November 2024	Best Supporting Actress	Lutesha	Nominated	
