= The Architecture of Love =

2024 romantic drama film

- Theatrical release poster
- Directed by: Teddy Soeriaatmadja
- Screenplay by: Alim Sudio
- Based on: The Architecture of Love by Ika Natassa
- Produced by: Chand Parwez Servia; Riza
- Starring: Putri Marino; Nicholas Saputra
- Cinematography: Vera Lestafa
- Edited by: Aline Jusria
- Music by: Ricky Lionardi
- Production companies: Starvision; Karuna Pictures; Legacy Pictures
- Release date: 30 April 2024 (Indonesia)
- Running time: 110 minutes
- Country: Indonesia
- Language: Indonesian

The Architecture of Love is a 2024 romantic drama film directed by Teddy Soeriaatmadja from a screenplay by Alim Sudio, based on the 2016 novel by Ika Natassa. The film stars Putri Marino and Nicholas Saputra. The film was released in Indonesian theatres on 30 April 2024. It received three nominations at the 2024 Indonesian Film Festival.

== Premise ==
A freshly divorced writer meets an architect while searching for inspiration for her new book in New York City.

== Cast ==
- Putri Marino as Raia Risjad
- Nicholas Saputra as River Jusuf
- Jerome Kurnia as Aga Jusuf
- Jihane Almira Chedid as Erin
- Omar Daniel as Diaz Umbara
- Arifin Putra as Alam

== Production ==
In October 2023, it was announced that Starvision had optioned the novel for a film adaptation alongside the cast announcement of Putri Marino and Nicholas Saputra. Principal photography took place in New York City and Jakarta in late October 2023.

== Release ==
The Architecture of Love was released in Indonesian theatres on 30 April 2024. The film surpassed one million admissions after thirty-three days of release. It garnered 1,003,999 admissions during its theatrical run.

Netflix acquired the film's distribution rights, releasing it on 6 September 2024. The film made its television debut on RCTI on 23 August 2025 at 9.30pm local time.

== Accolades ==
Award / Film Festival	Date of ceremony	Category	Recipient(s)	Result	Ref.
Festival Film Bandung	9 November 2024	Highly Commended Leading Actor	Nicholas Saputra	Nominated	
Festival Film Bandung	9 November 2024	Highly Commended Supporting Actor	Jerome Kurnia	Nominated	
Festival Film Bandung	9 November 2024	Highly Commended Original Score	Ricky Lionardi	Nominated	
Indonesian Film Festival	20 November 2024	Best Adapted Screenplay	Alim Sudio and Ika Natassa	Nominated	
Indonesian Film Festival	20 November 2024	Best Editing	Aline Jusria	Nominated	
Indonesian Film Festival	20 November 2024	Best Costume Design	Hagai Pakan	Nominated	
