= Monster (2023 Indonesian film) =

2023 thriller film

- Release poster
- Directed by: Rako Prijanto
- Screenplay by: Alim Sudio
- Based on: The Boy Behind the Door by: David Charbonier; Justin Powell
- Produced by: Frederica
- Starring: Marsha Timothy; Alex Abbad; Anantya Kirana; Sulthan Hamonangan
- Cinematography: Batara Goempar
- Edited by: Sentot Sahid; Iriani Irin
- Music by: Ramondo Gascaro
- Production company: Falcon Pictures
- Distributed by: Netflix
- Release date: 29 November 2023 (Jogja)
- Running time: 84 minutes
- Country: Indonesia
- Language: Silent

Monster is a 2023 horror - thriller film directed by Rako Prijanto from a screenplay written by Alim Sudio. The film features no dialogue and stars Anantya Kirana and Sulthan Hamonangan. It is a remake of the 2020 horror thriller film The Boy Behind the Door.

The film had its world premiere at the 18th Jogja-NETPAC Asian Film Festival on 29 November 2023. It received two nominations at the 2024 Indonesian Film Festival.

== Premise ==
Two children try to escape their kidnapper's house.

== Cast ==
- Anantya Kirana as Alana
- Sulthan Hamonangan as Rabin
- Marsha Timothy as Murni
- Alex Abbad as Jack

== Production ==
Falcon Pictures announced that they would remake the 2020 film The Boy Behind the Door with some adjustments, including making one of the main characters deaf and eliminating spoken dialogue.

== Release ==
Monster had its world premiere at the 18th Jogja-NETPAC Asian Film Festival on 29 November 2023, competing for the Indonesian Screen Awards. In February 2024, it was announced that Netflix acquired the film's distribution. It was released on the platform on 16 May 2024.

== Accolades ==
Award / Film Festival	Date of ceremony	Category	Recipient(s)	Result	Ref.
Indonesian Film Festival	20 November 2024	Best Editing	Sentot Sahid and Iriani Irin	Nominated	
Indonesian Film Festival	20 November 2024	Best Visual Effects	Dalang Kreasi	Nominated	
