= The Boy Behind the Door =

2020 horror-thriller film

- Theatrical release poster
- Directed by: David Charbonier; Justin Powell
- Written by: David Charbonier; Justin Powell
- Produced by: Rick Rosenthal; Jim Hart; Ryan Scaringe; John Hermann; Ryan Lewis
- Starring: Lonnie Chavis; Ezra Dewey; Kristin Bauer van Straten; Micah Hauptman; Scott Michael Foster
- Cinematography: Julian Amaru Estrada
- Edited by: Stephen Boyer
- Music by: Anton Sanko
- Production companies: Whitewater Films; Kinogo Pictures
- Distributed by: Shudder
- Release dates: September 27, 2020 (Fantastic Fest); July 29, 2021 (United States)
- Running time: 88 minutes
- Country: United States
- Language: English
- Box office: $127,693

The Boy Behind the Door is a 2020 American horror-thriller film written and directed by David Charbonier and Justin Powell. The film stars Lonnie Chavis, Ezra Dewey, Kristin Bauer van Straten, Scott Michael Foster, and Micah Hauptman, and focuses on two boys attempting to escape their kidnapper's house. It premiered at Fantastic Fest on September 27, 2020, and was released on the streaming service Shudder on July 29, 2021.

== Plot ==
In South Dakota, best friends Kevin O'Connor and Bobby Green are walking through the woods on their way home when they are kidnapped.

The two boys wake up inside the trunk of a car, and Kevin is taken inside while Bobby is left locked in the trunk. He is able to free himself and escape, but decides against running away after he hears Kevin screaming for help. He makes his way inside and discovers that Kevin has been chained up in the attic. The Creep arrives to the house and provides the kidnapper with a wad of cash. The kidnapper provides the Creep with a watch that is counting down an hour. The Creep visits Kevin in the locked room, but is distracted when Bobby accidentally drops a paperweight. The Creep eventually discovers Bobby and chases him, ending up in the kitchen, where Bobby accidentally kills him.

Bobby finds keys in the Creep's coat pocket but none of them unlocks the door behind which Kevin is trapped. His plan to use the Creep's car to get help doesn't work. While searching for another key, he discovers a trunk full of bloody boys' clothes and a rotary phone. He is able to call the police but the kidnapper returns and Bobby has to hang up before the police can track his location.

While the kidnapper checks on Kevin and showers, Bobby gets rid of the Creep's body and cleans up the blood in the kitchen. He discovers a safe containing cash, another key, and nude photos of other boys. He tries the new key but it doesn't work. He then tries picking the lock with a knife, slicing his hand and leaving a smear of blood on the door. The kidnapper notices the blood and realizes that Bobby is in the house. Bobby hides and traps himself in the bathroom and the kidnapper chops her way through with an axe, but Bobby is able to slice her hand with a nail file.

The police arrive and the kidnapper answers the door. She claims to be alone but the officer asks for her ID. After the woman doesn't return, the officer goes inside and discovers Bobby. He is then struck in the chest with an axe and Bobby hides. The kidnapper takes the officer's gun. She discovers the Creep's body, then follows Bobby down to the basement and explains that she expected him to suffocate in the trunk.

She offers to trade Kevin for Bobby to her buyer, at which point Bobby attacks her, handcuffing her to a pipe and stealing her keys. He is shot in the leg, but is able to slowly make it upstairs. Finally able to unlock the door, he frees Kevin (using the key he found in the safe with the pictures) and the boys make their way back downstairs, but Kevin is halted by a shock collar. Bobby runs back to the basement for pruning shears, but the kidnapper grabs his leg and sticks her finger in his bullet hole. Bobby frees himself by cutting her finger off, but he is too weak to make it back upstairs.

Kevin fights his way down to Bobby, suffering multiple shocks. He removes the collar using the pruning shears and attends to Bobby, who tells him to leave. Kevin refuses, and helps Bobby to the officer's car. He calls for help using the radio, finds a taser and a first aid kit, and treats Bobby's leg. The kidnapper frees herself from the basement, finds the boys, and drags Bobby outside the car. Before she can kill him, Kevin shocks her with the taser. The boys retreat to the woods and the kidnapper gives chase. She corners them and is about to kill them when a police officer shoots her dead.

Kevin and Bobby receive medical treatment and are taken home. The pair are later shown on a beach in California, where they said they wanted to go.

== Cast ==
- Lonnie Chavis as Bobby
- Ezra Dewey as Kevin
- Kristin Bauer van Straten as Ms. Burton
- Micah Hauptman as The Creep
- Scott Michael Foster as Officer Steward

== Development ==
Marking the writer-director duo's feature film debut, the project was conceived by David Charbonier and Justin Powell after they had been rejected by several production companies citing budget constraints. After unsuccessfully attempting to self-fund the film, they contracted with Whitewater Films who went on to produce. Filming took place at a remote house in the area of Culver City, California, over a span of 22 days. Charbonier and Powell claim to have based elements of the film on The Shining and The Goonies, while acknowledging similarities between the film and The People Under the Stairs, though they say they had never seen the film.

== Remake ==
In 2023, Indonesian production company Falcon Pictures announced that they would remake the film. It was titled Monster, which had its world premiere at the 18th Jogja-NETPAC Asian Film Festival.

== Reception ==
On review aggregation website Rotten Tomatoes the film has an approval rating of 97% based on 62 reviews. The site's critical consensus reads, "A tense, terrifying, and all-around outstanding feature debut for its co-directing duo, The Boy Behind the Door should thrill discerning horror fans." On Metacritic, the film has a weighted average score of 65 out of 100, based on 6 critics, indicating "generally favorable" reviews.

Justin Lowe of The Hollywood Reporter called the film a "delicate and memorably successful balancing act that effectively contextualizes some deliberately challenging material," while Richard Whittaker of The Austin Chronicle called it "a perfectly-executed game of cat-and-mouse, twisting the tension in perfect real time." Dennis Harvey of Variety commended the "effective use of a simple premise and modest means to create a nicely nerve-jangling thriller." Dan Stubbs of NME gave the film five out of five stars, describing it as "convention-breaking" and "undeniably brilliant", though "very difficult to watch."

Phil Hoad of The Guardian gave a mixed review, calling the film a "tightly confined and well-marshalled slasher-thriller," yet claiming that "its best-friends-for-ever message is barely enough to keep the film on the right side of palatable." Elisabeth Vincentelli of The New York Times also gave a mixed review, describing the film's storytelling as "virtuosic" and "abstractly taut" on one hand, but criticizing its "intent minimalism" and action scenes.
