= Heartbreak Motel =

2024 romantic drama film

- Release poster
- Directed by: Angga Dwimas Sasongko
- Screenplay by: Angga Dwimas Sasongko; Alim Sudio
- Produced by: Kori Adyaning
- Starring: Laura Basuki; Reza Rahadian; Chicco Jerikho
- Cinematography: Arnand Pratikto
- Edited by: Hendra Adhi Susanto
- Music by: Abel Huray
- Production company: Visinema Pictures
- Release date: 1 August 2024
- Running time: 115 minutes
- Country: Indonesia
- Language: Indonesian

Heartbreak Motel is a 2024 romantic drama film directed by Angga Dwimas Sasongko from a screenplay he wrote with Alim Sudio, based on the 2022 novel by Ika Natassa. It stars Laura Basuki, Reza Rahadian, and Chicco Jerikho. It was released on 1 August 2024 in Indonesian theatres. It received five nominations at the 2024 Indonesian Film Festival, including Best Actress (Basuki).

== Premise ==
A famous actress seeks escapism in a motel, faced with two men: her ex-boyfriend and a motel guest.

== Cast ==
- Laura Basuki as Ava Alessandra
- Reza Rahadian as Reza Malik
- Chicco Jerikho as Raga

== Production ==
In December 2023, it was announced that Visinema Pictures would adapt the novel along with the cast announcement. The filming used three different types of cameras, a digital camera, a 16 mm film camera, and a 35 mm film camera.

== Release ==
Heartbreak Motel was released in Indonesian theatres on 1 August 2024. It garnered 74,616 admission during its theatrical run.

== Accolades ==
Award / Film Festival	Date of ceremony	Category	Recipient(s)	Result	Ref.
Festival Film Bandung	9 November 2024	Highly Commended Leading Actress	Laura Basuki	Nominated	
Festival Film Bandung	9 November 2024	Highly Commended Art Direction	Adrianto Sinaga	Nominated	
Festival Film Bandung	9 November 2024	Highly Commended Original Score	Abel Huray	Nominated	
Indonesian Film Festival	20 November 2024	Best Actress	Laura Basuki	Nominated	
Indonesian Film Festival	20 November 2024	Best Cinematography	Arnand Pratikto	Nominated	
Indonesian Film Festival	20 November 2024	Best Art Direction	Adrianto Sinaga	Nominated	
Indonesian Film Festival	20 November 2024	Best Costume Design	Fadillah Putri Yunidar	Nominated	
Indonesian Film Festival	20 November 2024	Best Makeup	Aktris Handradjasa	Nominated	
