= Four Seasons in Java =

2026 drama film by Kamila Andini

- Indonesian theatrical release poster
- Indonesian: Empat Musim Pertiwi
- Directed by: Kamila Andini
- Written by: Kamila Andini
- Produced by: Ifa Isfansyah
- Starring: Putri Marino; Arya Saloka; Christine Hakim; Hana Pitrashata Malasan
- Cinematography: Batara Goempar
- Edited by: Jasmine Ng
- Music by: Ricky Lionardi; Bottlesmoker
- Production company: Forka Films
- Release dates: 13 September 2026 (TIFF); 8 October 2026 (Indonesia)
- Running time: 137 minutes
- Countries: Indonesia; Singapore; Netherlands; Norway; Germany; France; Poland; Thailand
- Languages: Indonesian; Javanese

Four Seasons in Java (Indonesian: Empat Musim Pertiwi) is a 2026 drama film written and directed by Kamila Andini. A co-production of Indonesia, Singapore, Netherlands, Norway, Germany, France, Poland, and Thailand, it stars Putri Marino as Pertiwi, the title character.

The film had its world premiere at the Centrepiece section of the 2026 Toronto International Film Festival on 13 September, and is scheduled for Indonesian theatrical release on 8 October. It was also selected as the Indonesian submission for the Best International Feature Film at the 99th Academy Awards.

== Premise ==
A woman returns to her village after being imprisoned for the murder of a man who tried to rape her.

== Cast ==
- Putri Marino as Pertiwi
- Arya Saloka as Bisma
- Christine Hakim as Mak Ira
- Hana Pitrashata Malasan as Niken
- Iswadi Pratama as Pertiwi's father
- Hargi Sundari as Pertiwi's mother
- Nagra Pakusadewo as Jonet
- Totos Rasiti as Fajar

== Production ==
In May 2024, Four Seasons in Java participated in the All Genres Project Market at the Far East Film Festival. In October 2024, the project was first officially revealed during Forka Films' slate announcement, with Kamila Andini attached as the director and Anthony Chen of Giraffe Pictures co-producing. In February 2025, the project was selected to participate at CineMart, held during the International Film Festival Rotterdam. It also participated at the Berlinale Co-Production Market in the same month. Imajinari announced their investment in the project during their slate reveal in March 2025. In June 2025, it was reported that it received €75,000 production grant from the Netherlands Film Fund and Hubert Bals Fund. In the same month, the project also received 675,000 Norwegian kroner from Sørfond, with Verona Meier of Storm Films serving as a co-producer.

In August 2025, it participated in the Venice Gap-Financing Market, seeking final post-production funding, particularly for visual effects. It was reported that Fred Burle of German production company One Two Films, Dutch production company Lemming Film's Erik Glijnis, and Christophe Bruncher of French production company Ici èt La Productions, also joined as co-producers. In October 2025, the project won the Tokyo Project Award and Kongchak Award at the Tokyo Gap-Financing Market. In November 2025, it was reported that Polish production company PFX, Indonesian production company Brand Film, and Thai-based company Chada Entertainment joined as co-producers. In March 2026, the project received HBF+Europe post production grant. Miles Films, Jagartha, Trinity Entertainment Network, Teamup Circular Creative, and Navvaros Entertainment financed the film.

In an interview with Variety, Andini described that the film as a "collision between modernity and personal trauma, repeating in daily life".

The official teaser was released on 19 August 2026.

== Release ==
Four Seasons in Java had its world premiere at the Centrepiece section of the 2026 Toronto International Film Festival on 13 September. An exclusive ten-minute preview of the film was screened at the 20th Jogja-NETPAC Asian Film Festival on 30 November 2025. It will be screened in 'A Window on Asian Cinema' section of the 31st Busan International Film Festival on 7 October 2026, and in the revamped section Crosscut Asia+ of 39th Tokyo International Film Festival in late October 2026.

It is scheduled for a limited release on 22 September 2026, followed by a wide theatrical release on 8 October 2026.

== See also ==
- List of submissions to the 99th Academy Awards for Best International Feature Film
- List of Indonesian submissions for the Academy Award for Best International Feature Film
