= Harlot's Prayer =

2023 drama film

- Theatrical release poster
- Indonesian: Tuhan, Izinkan Aku Berdosa
- Directed by: Hanung Bramantyo
- Written by: Ifan Ismail
- Based on: Tuhan Izinkan Aku Menjadi Pelacur! by Muhiddin M. Dahlan
- Produced by: Raam Punjabi
- Starring: Aghniny Haque; Donny Damara; Djenar Maesa Ayu; Andri Mashadi; Samo Rafael; Gotheng Iku Ahkin
- Cinematography: Satria Kurnianto
- Edited by: Haris F. Syah
- Production companies: MVP Pictures; Dapur Films
- Release dates: 27 October 2023 (Jakarta); 22 May 2024 (Indonesia)
- Running time: 117 minutes
- Country: Indonesia
- Language: Indonesian

Harlot's Prayer (Indonesian: Tuhan, Izinkan Aku Berdosa; lit. God, Allow Me to Sin) is a 2023 Indonesian drama film directed by Hanung Bramantyo from a screenplay by Ifan Ismail, based on the 2003 novel Tuhan Izinkan Aku Menjadi Pelacur! by Muhiddin M. Dahlan. It stars Aghniny Haque as Kiran. It had its world premiere at the 2023 Jakarta Film Week on 27 October 2023 and was released in Indonesian theatres on 22 May 2024.

The film received four nominations at the 2024 Indonesian Film Festival, including Best Actress (Haque).

== Premise ==
Kiran spends her youth dedicated to serving her community and religious figures she deeply respects. However, after experiencing multiple losses and betrayals, she decides to break away from her faith, taking control of her own thoughts and body in a rebellious act. She then chooses to take even bigger risks, exposing herself to greater danger.

== Cast ==
- Aghniny Haque as Kiran
- Donny Damara as Tomo
- Djenar Maesa Ayu as Ami
- Andri Mashadi as Daarul Fauzi
- Samo Rafael as Hudan
- Gotheng Iku Ahkin as Kiran's father

== Production ==
The development of the script began in 2020, during the COVID-19 pandemic. In February 2023, it was announced that Dapur Films optioned the film adaptation rights to adapt the 2003 novel Tuhan Izinkan Aku Menjadi Pelacur! by Muhiddin M. Dahlan into a feature film, alongside the cast announcement of Aghniny Haque and Andri Mashadi. The principal photography began in May 2023, taking place at the University of Amikom in Yogyakarta.

== Release ==
Harlot's Prayer had its world premiere at the 2023 Jakarta Film Week, competing for the Global Feature Award, on 27 October 2023. It was also screened at the 18th Jogja-NETPAC Asian Film Festival during the Indonesian Film Showcase section. The film was released in Indonesian theatres on 22 May 2024. It garnered 442,663 admissions during its first ten days. It garnered 655,725 admissions during its theatrical run.

== Accolades ==
Award / Film Festival	Date of ceremony	Category	Recipient(s)	Result	Ref.
Festival Film Bandung	9 November 2024	Highly Commended Film	Harlot's Prayer	Won	
Festival Film Bandung	9 November 2024	Highly Commended Leading Actor	Donny Damara	Nominated	
Festival Film Bandung	9 November 2024	Highly Commended Leading Actress	Aghniny Haque	Won	
Festival Film Bandung	9 November 2024	Highly Commended Screenplay	Ifan Ismail and Hanung Bramantyo	Nominated	
Festival Film Bandung	9 November 2024	Highly Commended Cinematography	Satria Kurnianto	Nominated	
Festival Film Bandung	9 November 2024	Highly Commended Art Direction	Edy Wibowo	Nominated	
Indonesian Film Festival	20 November 2024	Best Actress	Aghniny Haque	Nominated	
Indonesian Film Festival	20 November 2024	Best Supporting Actor	Donny Damara	Nominated	
Indonesian Film Festival	20 November 2024	Best Adapted Screenplay	Ifan Ismail	Nominated	
Indonesian Film Festival	20 November 2024	Best Editing	Haris F. Syah	Nominated	
