= 13 Bombs in Jakarta =

2023 film by Angga Dwimas Sasongko

- Directed by: Angga Dwimas Sasongko
- Produced by: Taufan Adryan
- Starring: Chicco Kurniawan; Ardhito Pramono; Lutesha; Rio Dewanto; Putri Ayudya; Ganindra Bimo; Niken Anjani; Rukman Rosadi; Muhammad Khan; Andri Mashadi
- Cinematography: Arnand Pratikto
- Edited by: Hendra Adhi Susanto
- Music by: Abel Huray
- Production companies: Visinema Pictures; Indodax; Legacy Pictures; Volix Pictures; Folkative; INFIA; Barunson E&A
- Distributed by: GSC Movies (Malaysia)
- Release dates: 2 December 2023 (JAFF); 28 December 2023 (Indonesia); 8 February 2024 (Malaysia)
- Running time: 143 minutes
- Country: Indonesia
- Language: Indonesian
- Budget: Rp75 billion (estimated)

13 Bombs in Jakarta (Indonesian: 13 Bom di Jakarta) is an Indonesian espionage action film released in 2023, directed by Angga Dwimas Sasongko. The film, produced by Visinema Pictures, stars Chicco Kurniawan, Ardhito Pramono, and Lutesha. It premiered in Indonesian cinemas on 28 December 2023 and in Malaysia on 1 February 2024.

== Synopsis ==
The film depicts a group of terrorists planning a series of bombings in Jakarta, the capital of Indonesia. The 13 Bomb attacks aim to destroy the city and cause numerous casualties. The Indonesian Counter Terrorism Agency (ICTA) receives intelligence about the bomb plot and promptly forms a team of secret agents. The team, led by Emil (Ganindra Bimo), an experienced intelligence agent, takes immediate action to prevent the devastating attacks.

== Cast ==
- Rio Dewanto as Arok/Ismail Gani
- Putri Ayudya as Karin Anjani
- Chicco Kurniawan as Oscar Darmawan
- Ardhito Pramono as William Sutanto
- Ganindra Bimo as Emil
- Lutesha as Agnes
- Muhammad Khan as Waluyo
- Rukman Rosadi as Damaskus Iryawan
- Niken Anjani as Gita Pratiwi
- Andri Mashadi as Fajar
- Aksara Dena as Malik
- Alyssa Abidin as Malik's wife
- Mila Jamila as Tia
- Akbarry Noor as Akbari (Firewall Officer)
- Yusuf Ozkan as Street Musician
- Chicco Jerikho as ICTA Inspection Officer
- Toran Waibro as Karin's Assistant
- Raeshard Octaviansha as Money Truck Guard
- Andi Sujono as Andi (Gita's Assistant)

== Production ==
=== Pre-production ===
The film was first announced on 10 April 2023, through an Instagram post by Angga Dwimas Sasongko. In the post, he revealed that Taufan Adryan would produce the film, and the script was co-written by him and M. Irfan Ramli, with the cast already selected.

=== Cast Selection ===
On 2 June 2023, Chicco Kurniawan, Ardhito Pramono, Lutesha, Rio Dewanto, Putri Ayudya, Ganindra Bimo, Niken Anjani, Rukman Rosadi, Muhammad Khan, and Andri Mashadi were officially confirmed for their roles in the film through an Instagram post by Angga Dwimas Sasongko.

=== Shooting ===
Principal photography began in June 2023, taking place in Jakarta and Klaten, Central Java, for 41 days.

=== Music ===
"Merintih Perih" was composed and arranged by Reza Dwiputranto (of the band Sore) and released by Aksara Records.

== Marketing ==
The teaser trailer was released on 17 November 2023. The main trailer and poster were released on 24 November 2023.

== Release ==
13 Bombs in Jakarta premiered at the 18th Jogja-NETPAC Asian Film Festival on 2 December 2023, as the closing film of the festival. It was then released in Indonesian theaters on 28 December 2023.

GSC Movies distributed the film for the Malaysian market, and was shown in cinemas starting 1 February during the school break. Additionally, the film is scheduled to be screened in the Netherlands at the International Film Festival Rotterdam on 29 January 2024.

In April the film 13 Bombs in Jakarta also won two categories at the Ho Chi Minh City International Film Festival (HIFF) in Vietnam, namely Best Sound Design and Best Editing. The film 13 Bombs in Jakarta will also be screened at the Far East Film Festival (FEFF) in Udine, Italy.

== Reception ==
The film was well received in Indonesia, achieving an audience count of one hundred thousand on the first day of its screening.

== Accolades ==
Award / Film Festival	Date of ceremony	Category	Recipient(s)	Result	Ref.
Indonesian Film Festival	20 November 2024	Best Cinematography	Arnand Pratikto	Nominated	
Indonesian Film Festival	20 November 2024	Best Visual Effects	After Lab, Urat Nadi, and Mattebox Visualworks	Nominated	
Indonesian Film Festival	20 November 2024	Best Art Direction	Ahmad Zulkarnaen	Nominated	
