= Samsara (2024 film) =

2024 drama film

- Official poster
- Directed by: Garin Nugroho
- Screenplay by: Garin Nugroho
- Produced by: Gita Fara; Aldo Swastia
- Starring: Ario Bayu; Juliet Widyasari Burnett
- Cinematography: Batara Goempar
- Edited by: Beck
- Music by: Wayan Sudirana; Kasimyn
- Production companies: Cineria Films; Garin Workshop; Lynx Films
- Release dates: 10 May 2024 (Singapore); 20 October 2025 (Indonesia)
- Running time: 80 minutes
- Country: Indonesia

Samsara is a 2024 Indonesian silent drama film directed by Garin Nugroho. It stars Ario Bayu and Juliet Widyasari Burnett. The film is presented with live music. It had its world premiere on 10 May 2024 at the Esplanade – Theatres on the Bay in Singapore.

It received nine nominations at the 2024 Indonesian Film Festival and won four awards, including Best Director for Nugroho. It received three nominations at the 18th Asia Pacific Screen Awards, including Best Film.

== Premise ==
In 1930s Bali, an impoverished man performs a dark ritual to gain wealth in order to earn the approval of the wealthy parents of the woman he loves. He strikes a bargain with the monkey King and performs a dark ritual to gain wealth, but in the process, he curses his wife and child into suffering.

== Cast ==
- Ario Bayu as Darta
- Juliet Widyasari Burnett as Sinta
- Gus Bang Sada as Monkey King
- Valentine Payen-Wicaksono as Sinta's Mother

== Release ==
Samsara had its world premiere on 10 May 2024 at the Esplanade – Theatres on the Bay in Singapore during the Pesta Raya – Malay Festival of the Arts. The live music was performed by Gamelan ensemble Gamelan Yuganada and electronic music duo Gabber Modus Operandi. The show was performed for the first time in Indonesia during the Mega Festival Indonesia Bertutur on 16 August 2024 in Nusa Dua, Bali. It was the opening film of the 19th Jogja-NETPAC Asian Film Festival.

The film was released in select Indonesian theatres on 20 November 2025.

== Accolades ==
Award / Film Festival	Date of ceremony	Category	Recipient(s)	Result	Ref.
Indonesian Film Festival	20 November 2024	Best Picture	Gita Fara and Aldo Swastia	Nominated	
Indonesian Film Festival	20 November 2024	Best Director	Garin Nugroho	Won	
Indonesian Film Festival	20 November 2024	Best Actor	Ario Bayu	Nominated	
Indonesian Film Festival	20 November 2024	Best Cinematography	Batara Goempar	Won	
Indonesian Film Festival	20 November 2024	Best Sound	Janu Janardhana and Sutrisno	Nominated	
Indonesian Film Festival	20 November 2024	Best Original Score	Wayan Sudirana and Kasimyn	Won	
Indonesian Film Festival	20 November 2024	Best Art Direction	Vida Sylvia	Nominated	
Indonesian Film Festival	20 November 2024	Best Costume Design	Retno Ratih Damayanti	Won	
Indonesian Film Festival	20 November 2024	Best Makeup	Retno Ratih Damayanti	Nominated	
Film Pilihan Tempo	5 February 2025	Film Pilihan Tempo	Samsara	Nominated	
Film Pilihan Tempo	5 February 2025	Best Director	Garin Nugroho	Won	
Film Pilihan Tempo	5 February 2025	Best Screenplay	Garin Nugroho	Nominated	
Film Pilihan Tempo	5 February 2025	Best Actor	Ario Bayu	Nominated	
Asia Pacific Screen Awards	27 November 2025	Best Film	Garin Nugroho and Gita Fara	Nominated	
Asia Pacific Screen Awards	27 November 2025	Best Director	Garin Nugroho	Nominated	
Asia Pacific Screen Awards	27 November 2025	Best Cinematography	Batara Goempar	Won	
