= Putri Marino =

Indonesian actress

- Marino in 2026
- Born: Ni Luh Dharma Putri Marino; 4 August 1993 (age 33); Denpasar, Indonesia
- Education: Mercu Buana University
- Occupations: Actress; model; presenter
- Years active: 2014–present
- Spouse: Chicco Jerikho (m. 2018)
- Relatives: Sitha Marino (sister)
- Awards: 2017 Citra Award for Best Actress

Ni Luh Dharma Putri Marino (born 4 August 1993) is an Indonesian actress, model, and presenter of Italian-Balinese descent. She is the second debut actress to win the Citra Award for Best Actress in the film Posesif (2017) – after Christine Hakim in 1974 with Cinta Pertama (1973).

Marino is married to Indonesian actor and producer Chicco Jerikho. She is the older sister of the model and actress Sitha Marino.

== Filmography ==
=== Film ===
Year	Title	Role	Notes
2017	Posesif	Lala Anindhita	
2017	Mau Jadi Apa?	Putri	
2018	Jelita Sejuba: Mencintai Kesatria Negara	Syarifah	
2018	Sultan Agung: Tahta, Perjuangan, Cinta	Young Lembayung	
2018	Menunggu Pagi	Nina	
2019	Terima Kasih Cinta	Eva Meliana Santi	
2021	Losmen Bu Broto	Jeng Pur	
2021	One Night Stand	Lea	Bioskop Online original film
2021	First, Second & Third Love	Asia	
2022	The Big 4	Dina	
2024	The Architecture of Love	Raia	
2024	Borderless Fog	Sanja Arunika	
2024	Redemption of Sin	Tirta	
2024	Goodbye, Farewell	Wyn	
2026	Four Seasons in Java	Pertiwi	

=== Television ===
Year	Title	Role	Network
2013–16	My Trip My Adventure	Presenter	Trans TV

=== Webseries ===
Year	Title	Role	Production	Network(s)
2021	Layangan Putus	Kinan Aripurnami	MD Entertainment	WeTV & iflix
2023	Cigarette Girl	Arum	BASE Entertainment	Netflix

== Award and nomination ==
Year	Award	Category	Work	Result
2017	Indonesian Film Festival	Best Actress	Posesif	Won
2017	Tempo Film Festival	Tempo's Choice Actress	Posesif	Nominated
2017	Maya Award	Best New Actress	Posesif	Won
2017	i-Cinema Awards 2017	Best Lead Actress	Posesif	Won
2018	Bandung Film Festival	Best Actress	Jelita Sejuba: Mencintai Kesatria Negara	Nominated
2021	Tempo Film Festival	Tempo's Choice Supporting Actress	Losmen Bu Broto	Won
