= Grave Torture =

2024 film by Joko Anwar

- Theatrical release poster
- Indonesian: Siksa Kubur
- Directed by: Joko Anwar
- Written by: Joko Anwar
- Produced by: Tia Hasibuan
- Starring: Faradina Mufti; Reza Rahadian; Widuri Puteri; Muzakki Ramdhan; Slamet Rahardjo; Christine Hakim
- Cinematography: Ical Tanjung
- Edited by: Joko Anwar
- Music by: Aghi Narottama
- Production companies: Rapi Films; Legacy Pictures; Come and See Pictures; IFI Sinema; Komet Productions
- Distributed by: Rapi Films (Indonesia)
- Release dates: 11 April 2024 (Indonesia); 16 September 2024 (Netflix)
- Running time: 117 minutes
- Country: Indonesia
- Language: Indonesian
- Budget: $314.445
- Box office: $10.5 million

Grave Torture (Indonesian: Siksa Kubur) (Note: Released in Malaysia as simply Siksa.) is a 2024 Indonesian supernatural psychological horror film written, directed, and edited by Joko Anwar. It is based on Anwar's 2012 short film of the same name. The film follows a woman who, after losing her parents in a suicide bombing, attempts to disprove the existence of punishment after death by having herself buried alive alongside a notorious sinner. However, she soon experiences a series of terrifying events.

The film stars Faradina Mufti, Reza Rahadian, Widuri Puteri, Muzakki Ramdhan, Slamet Rahardjo, and Christine Hakim.

The film received the most nominations at the 2024 Indonesian Film Festival with seventeen, including Best Picture.

== Plot ==
Sita and Adil live with their parents who run a small bakery. One morning a man comes in and gives Adil a cassette tape, saying he recorded it himself, and that they "seek refuge with Allah." He warns Adil not to go outside, before he leaves the shop and detonates a bomb on the street outside, which kills many, including Sita and Adil's parents. The bomber, driven by religious fear of siksa kubur (grave torture), believed his actions would save him from eternal torment after death. After being interviewed by the police, the children play the bomber's tape, on which the phrase, "Siksa Kubur," is heard, accompanied by the screams of a man being horrifically tortured.

After the tragedy, Sita and Adil are sent to a strictly religious boarding school, where they struggle to cope with the loss of their parents. Sita, in particular, becomes obsessed with the notion of Siksa Kubur—the punishment that occurs in the grave after death, inflicted by two angels, Munkar and Nakir. One evening, Sita overhears a conversation between two teachers, Umaya and Ustadzah, in which they discuss the school's benefactor, Mr. Ilham. Ilham is revealed to have abused some of the children, including Ismail, who died as a result. Sita goes to confront Ilham at his residence, but sees that Adil is there, where he is raped by Ilham. Later that night, with Umaya's help, the siblings escape through a tunnel, where they are briefly tormented by visions of a severely disfigured Ismail.

Years later, as adults, Sita works in a nursing home, still consumed by her mission to discredit the concept of grave torture. One of her wards, Mr. Wayhu, begins to show signs of dementia, despite still being physically able. His family tries to convince Sita to release him from her care as the cost is too high, but Sita fiercely rebuffs their request, saying that Mr. Wayhu needs the best care possible. She and Adil, now a mortician, visit a cemetery to bury a recently deceased resident. While there, they visit a grave of a serial killer named Masbeth. Sita says that "the most ruthless man" she's ever known will be buried next to this grave, to truly see whether grave torture is real, though she refuses to reveal the identity of the man to Adil. It is then revealed that the suicide bomber claimed to have recorded his cassette tape at Masbeth's grave.

Adil's wife, Lala, throws him out of their home, accusing him of being emotionally unavailable and consumed by his work. Sita and Mr. Wahyu have a philosophical discussion about religion; Mr. Wahyu does not believe it is possible for neither damned souls nor dead bodies to be tortured after death, meaning that he believes he is free to commit whichever sins he wishes in life. Sita retorts by revealing that she knows his true identity - he is Mr. Ilham. She reminds him of his victims, including Adil and Ismail. He replies that, through his generosity, he gave many children a better chance at life, even his victims. Adil arrives and attacks Ilham, but is stopped by Sita, who explains that she has been caring for him for a purpose: to observe whether any torture will happen to Ilham in the grave. She tells him that if such a prolific sinner as him experiences no punishment after death, it proves that religion is a lie. After refuting life as a futile joke, Ilham shoots himself dead.

The siblings bury Ilham in the grave next to Masbeth. Sita volunteers to be buried with Ilham's body for one night, with a pipe for air and an infrared camera to record inside the grave. Adil keeps watch above, where he is stalked by a cobra.

The next day, with the help of Husein, one of her residents, Sita is interviewed on live TV, where she reveals her entire story and plays the recording from the grave. However, there is nothing on the memory card. Sita angrily confronts Adil and accuses him of switching the memory card, and the two argue about their parents' deaths and Sita's obsession with grave torture.

Sita begins to experience hallucinations of demons. One of her residents, Pandi, is caught having an affair with Lali, a nurse. His wife, Nani, throws him out of their room, despite Pandi's protestations that she is unable to look after herself. Later that night, Nani wets herself and goes to the laundry to wash her nightdress, but she becomes stuck in a faulty washing machine and killed. Pandi blames Sita for his wife's death and begs for Nani's forgiveness.

That night, Sita attends a seance led by Mrs. Juwita, who claims to hear the dead. Residents Pandi, Hadi and Husein are also there. Juwita invokes Nani, who tells Pandi that, in order to earn her forgiveness, he must kill Lali. Sita stops the seance, but not before Juwita invokes Adil, who says "help Ismail." Lali is later chased by Pandi and killed by Hadi. In the mortuary, Adil is haunted by visions of reanimated corpses.

Sita's appearance on TV has sparked a trend of people visiting cemeteries to record the sounds coming from graves, many with success, which religious leaders claim has restored faith in religion, but has also seen a rise in suicide bombings with the perpetrators hoping to receive martyrdom. Frustrated that Ilham can lie peacefully in death, Sita digs into his grave and jumps in. She finds herself in the tunnel from her childhood, where she sees visions of the disfigured Ismail, screaming for her help; of Adil, crying in the mortuary; and of her parents' bakery in the moments before their deaths.

Once again encountering Ismail, she decides to help him escape the advancing Ilham. Sita falls down a ravine and suddenly wakes in Ilham's grave on the first night she was buried with him. A cobra enters the grave through the air hole and climbs down Ilham's throat. Ilham wakes, and Sita watches in abject horror as he is repeatedly tortured by demonic forces, his flesh regenerating after every torment, ready to face a new one. While witnessing the horrors, Sita recants her skepticism and screams that she wants to repent, begging Allah's forgiveness.

Adil, wounded and weak from a possible snake bite, breaks through the grave and saves Sita before it fills with earth. Just as they are about to escape, an otherworldly voice asks Sita "who is your god?"

A brief epilogue shows that Pandi and Nani are alive and still together, hinting that Sita died the first night she was in the grave, and that all the events since have been her version of hell - realising grave torture is real.

== Cast ==
- Faradina Mufti as Sita
  - Widuri Puteri as young Sita
- Reza Rahadian as Adil
  - Muzakki Ramdhan as young Adil
- Christine Hakim as Nani
- Slamet Rahardjo as Wahyu Sutama/Ilham Sutisna
- Fachri Albar as Sanjaya Arif, father of Sita and Adil
- Happy Salma as Mutia Kirana, mother of Sita and Adil
- Arswendy Bening Swara as Pandi Hakim
- Niniek L. Karim as Juwita Larasati
- Jajang C. Noer as Ningsih Chadijah
- Putri Ayudya as Umaya Rahma
- Djenar Maesa Ayu as Inayah
- Egi Fedly as Husein
- Haydar Salishz as Amar
- Runny Rudiyanti as Lani
- Arfian Arisandy as mysterious man
- Azzam Fikri Pratama as young wahyu

== Release ==
Grave Torture was released in Indonesia on Eid al-Fitr day April 11, along with Dancing Village: The Curse Begins directed by Kimo Stamboel. Trans7 acquired the film's broadcasting rights, premiering it on 20 March 2026.

== Reception ==
=== Box office ===
Grave Torture opened with 257,871 admissions, which is one of the highest opening days for an Indonesian film. By the end of its release, the film surpassed 4 million admissions, making it one of the highest grossing Indonesian films of all time, It competed closely with Dancing Village: The Curse Begins, which on May 14 was announced to have received 3,985,278 admissions. In Russia, the movie released on June 6, and grossed $271,389. In Vietnam, it was released on July 31, and has grossed $57,949.

=== Critical response ===
Jayanty Nada Shofa of Jakarta Globe reviewed the film, saying that "Grave Torture is a neatly executed piece -- something that is quite refreshing amidst the influx of subpar Indonesian horror films. But personally speaking, it is not the scenes of a woman getting stuck in a washing machine or the final grave torture of the big bad Wahyu that make the most lasting impression. It is the first act, namely before the time-skip. Grave Torture boasts a star-studded cast with renowned actors claiming the supporting best character roles. Overall, the first act of “Grave Torture” is still an incredibly solid piece of work. But because of how well-executed it is, the rest of the movie—while still good—feels somewhat lacking compared to the first act."

=== Accolades ===
Award / Film Festival	Date of ceremony	Category	Recipient(s)	Result	Ref.
Festival Film Bandung	9 November 2024	Highly Commended Leading Actress	Faradina Mufti	Nominated	
Festival Film Bandung	9 November 2024	Highly Commended Supporting Actor	Slamet Rahardjo Djarot	Won	
Festival Film Bandung	9 November 2024	Highly Commended Cinematography	Ical Tanjung	Nominated	
Indonesian Film Festival	20 November 2024	Best Picture	Tia Hasibuan	Nominated	
Indonesian Film Festival	20 November 2024	Best Director	Joko Anwar	Nominated	
Indonesian Film Festival	20 November 2024	Best Actor	Reza Rahadian	Nominated	
Indonesian Film Festival	20 November 2024	Best Actress	Faradina Mufti	Nominated	
Indonesian Film Festival	20 November 2024	Best Supporting Actor	Arswendy Bening Swara	Nominated	
Indonesian Film Festival	20 November 2024	Best Supporting Actor	Slamet Rahardjo Djarot	Nominated	
Indonesian Film Festival	20 November 2024	Best Supporting Actress	Widuri Puteri	Nominated	
Indonesian Film Festival	20 November 2024	Best Original Screenplay	Joko Anwar	Nominated	
Indonesian Film Festival	20 November 2024	Best Cinematography	Ical Tanjung	Nominated	
Indonesian Film Festival	20 November 2024	Best Visual Effects	Lumine Studio, TheCutShop, Qanary Studios, The Organism NO3G Visual Effect, and Abby Eldipie	Nominated	
Indonesian Film Festival	20 November 2024	Best Sound	Mohamad Ikhsan and Anhar Moha	Won	
Indonesian Film Festival	20 November 2024	Best Original Score	Aghi Narottama	Nominated	
Indonesian Film Festival	20 November 2024	Best Theme Song	Tony Merle and Tia Hasibuan for "Jalan Pulang"	Nominated	
Indonesian Film Festival	20 November 2024	Best Theme Song	Bemby Gusti and Tia Hasibuan for "Kisah Anak Manusia"	Nominated	
Indonesian Film Festival	20 November 2024	Best Art Direction	Allan Sebastian	Nominated	
Indonesian Film Festival	20 November 2024	Best Costume Design	Monika Paska	Nominated	
Indonesian Film Festival	20 November 2024	Best Makeup	Novie Ariyanti	Nominated	
Film Pilihan Tempo	5 February 2025	Film Pilihan Tempo	Grave Torture	Nominated	
Film Pilihan Tempo	5 February 2025	Best Director	Joko Anwar	Nominated	
Film Pilihan Tempo	5 February 2025	Best Actor	Reza Rahadian	Nominated	
Film Pilihan Tempo	5 February 2025	Best Supporting Actor	Slamet Rahardjo Djarot	Nominated	
Film Pilihan Tempo	5 February 2025	Best Supporting Actress	Widuri Puteri	Nominated	

== See also ==
- Indonesian horror
