= Borderless Fog =

2024 crime thriller film by Edwin

- Promotional release poster
- Indonesian: Kabut Berduri
- Directed by: Edwin
- Written by: Edwin; Ifan Ismail
- Produced by: Meiske Taurisia; Muhammad Zaidy
- Starring: Putri Marino; Yoga Pratama; Lukman Sardi
- Cinematography: Gunnar Nimpuno
- Edited by: Ahmad Yuniardi; Chonlasit Upanigkit
- Music by: Abel Huray; Dave Lumenta
- Production company: Palari Films
- Distributed by: Netflix
- Release date: 1 August 2024
- Running time: 112 minutes
- Country: Indonesia
- Language: Indonesian

Borderless Fog (Indonesian: Kabut Berduri) is a 2024 crime thriller film directed by Edwin from a screenplay he wrote with Ifan Ismail. The film stars Putri Marino as a detective who investigates a series of murders along the Indonesia–Malaysia border, alongside Yoga Pratama and Lukman Sardi. It was released by Netflix on 1 August 2024.

The film received twelve nominations at the 2024 Indonesian Film Festival, including Best Picture.

== Premise ==
A detective from Jakarta, Sanja, investigates a series of murders taking place at the Indonesia–Malaysia border, a remote province in Borneo that is riven with suspicion, superstition and shadowy forces where she must confront her past.

== Cast ==
- Putri Marino as Sanja Arunika
- Yoga Pratama as Thomas
- Lukman Sardi as Panca Nugraha
- Yudi Ahmad Tajudin as Bujang
- Yusuf Mahardika as Silas
- Iedil Dzuhrie Alaudin as James Linggong
- Kiki Narendra as Agam
- Siti Fauziah as Umi
- Sita Nursanti as dr. Mei
- Maryam Supraba as Lintang
- Nicholas Saputra as Daniel Lumenta
- Vonny Anggraini as Esther
- Tumpal Tampubolon as Juwing

== Production ==
The screenplay was developed based on a research conducted by an Indonesian anthropologist and the film's composer Dave Lumenta about the Indonesia–Malaysia border in Kalimantan in the 2000s. In March 2023, Netflix announced that the production had begun.

Principal photography took place over five weeks in West Kalimantan, particularly along the Indonesia–Malaysia border, Lubok Antu District, Sarawak (Malaysia), and also in Bogor, West Java. The production also recruited local cast and crew.

== Release ==
Before its release, Netflix showcased the film as part of its South East Asian slate in June 2024. Borderless Fog was released by Netflix on 1 August 2024.

== Accolades ==
Award / Film Festival	Date of ceremony	Category	Recipient(s)	Result	Ref.
Festival Film Bandung	9 November 2024	Highly Commended Supporting Actor	Yoga Pratama	Nominated	
Festival Film Bandung	9 November 2024	Highly Commended Cinematography	Gunnar Nimpuno	Nominated	
Festival Film Bandung	9 November 2024	Highly Commended Art Direction	Menfo Tantono and Guntur Mupak	Nominated	
Indonesian Film Festival	20 November 2024	Best Picture	Meiske Taurisia and Muhammad Zaidy	Nominated	
Indonesian Film Festival	20 November 2024	Best Director	Edwin	Nominated	
Indonesian Film Festival	20 November 2024	Best Actor	Yoga Pratama	Nominated	
Indonesian Film Festival	20 November 2024	Best Supporting Actor	Lukman Sardi	Nominated	
Indonesian Film Festival	20 November 2024	Best Original Screenplay	Ifan Ismail and Edwin	Nominated	
Indonesian Film Festival	20 November 2024	Best Cinematography	Gunnar Nimpuno	Nominated	
Indonesian Film Festival	20 November 2024	Best Visual Effects	Lumine Studio	Won	
Indonesian Film Festival	20 November 2024	Best Sound	Tommy Fahrizal and Wahyu Tri Purnomo	Nominated	
Indonesian Film Festival	20 November 2024	Best Original Score	Abel Huray and Dave Lumenta	Nominated	
Indonesian Film Festival	20 November 2024	Best Art Direction	Menfo Tantono and Guntur Mupak	Won	
Indonesian Film Festival	20 November 2024	Best Costume Design	Muthiara A. Rievena Putri	Nominated	
Indonesian Film Festival	20 November 2024	Best Makeup	Cherry Wirawan	Won	
Film Pilihan Tempo	5 February 2025	Film Pilihan Tempo	Borderless Fog	Nominated	
Film Pilihan Tempo	5 February 2025	Best Director	Edwin	Nominated	
Film Pilihan Tempo	5 February 2025	Best Screenplay	Ifan Ismail and Edwin	Won	
Film Pilihan Tempo	5 February 2025	Best Actor	Yoga Pratama	Won	
Film Pilihan Tempo	5 February 2025	Best Supporting Actor	Yudi Ahmad Tajudin	Won	
Film Pilihan Tempo	5 February 2025	Best Supporting Actor	Yusuf Mahardika	Nominated	
Film Pilihan Tempo	5 February 2025	Best Supporting Actress	Paula Rontoi	Nominated	
