= Yudi Datau =

Indonesian cinematographer

- Born: Indonesia
- Years active: 2003 -

Yudi Datau is an Indonesian cinematographer. His works include Arisan! (2003) and Denias Senandung Di Atas Awan (2006). Beautiful Pain was selected as the Malaysian entry for the Best Foreign Language Film at the 89th Academy Awards but it was not nominated.

== Filmography ==
- Arisan! (2003)
- Impian Kemarau (2004)
- Ungu Violet (2005)
- Gie (2005)
- Denias Senandung Di Atas Awan (2006)
- Nagabonar jadi 2 (2007)
- Tenggelamnya Kapal van der Wijck (2013)
- Critical Eleven (2017)
- Surat Kecil Untuk Tuhan (2017)
