= Gita Fara =

Indonesian film producer (born 1985)

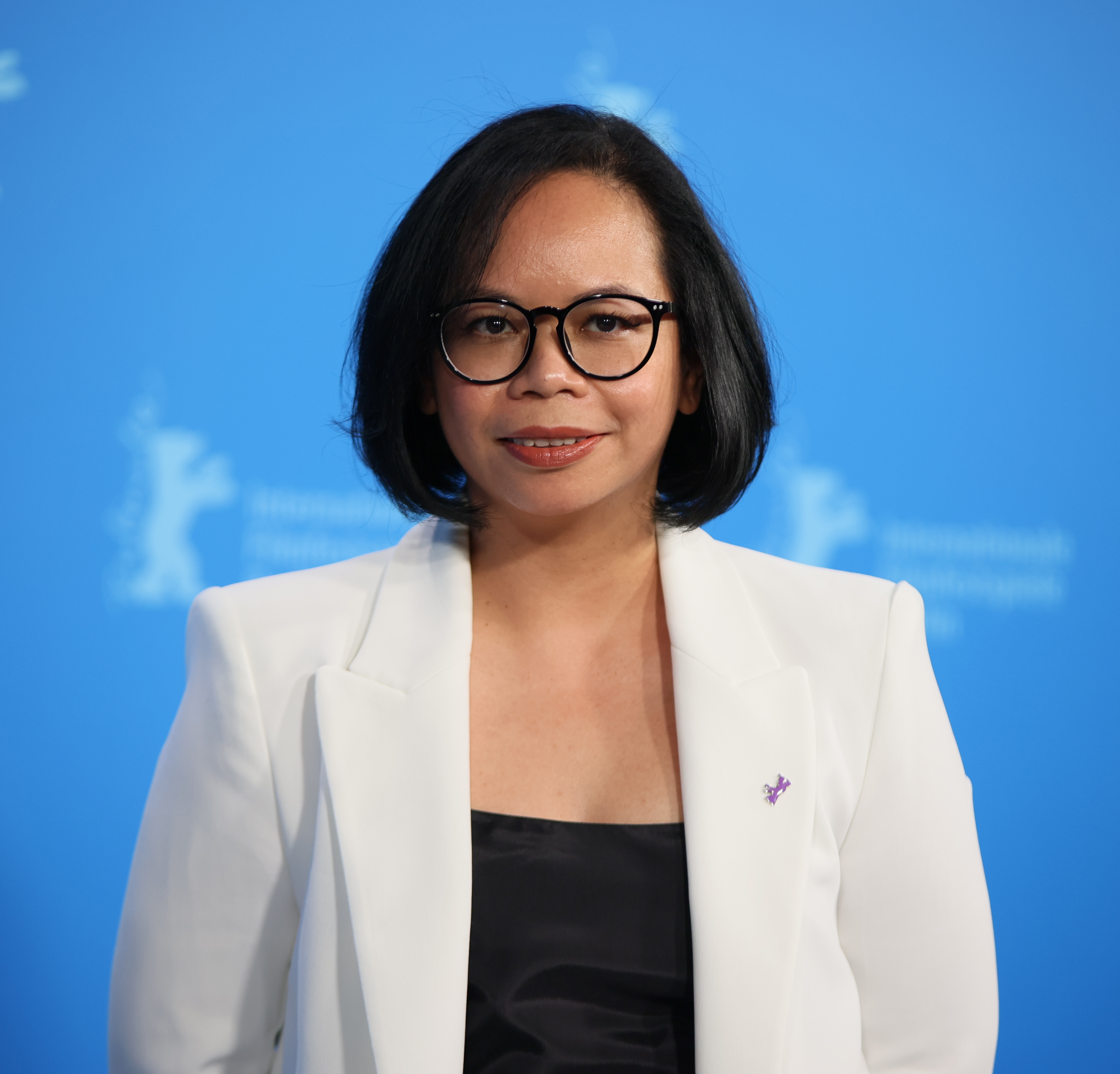
- Fara in 2022
- Born: Gita Fara Praditya; 2 February 1985 (age 41)
- Occupations: Film producer; film editor
- Years active: 2005–present

Gita Fara Praditya (born 2 February 1985) is an Indonesian film producer and editor. She won the Citra Award for Best Picture for producing Before, Now & Then (2022) and On Your Lap (2025).

== Career ==
Fara started her career in the film industry as an assistant editor for documentary film Serambi (2005) and Garin Nugroho's musical film Opera Jawa (2006). As a producer, she made her producing debut as a line producer for Kamila Andini's directorial debut film The Mirror Never Lies in 2011. In 2017, she founded production company Cineria Films with director Aldo Swastia.

In 2024, she was selected as one of the Producers Under the Spotlight in Marché du Film along with four other Indonesian producers, Yulia Evina Bhara, Ifa Isfansyah, Mandy Marahimin, and Muhammad Zaidy.

== Filmography ==
Year	Film	Credit
2005	Serambi	Assistant editor
2006	Opera Jawa	Assistant editor
2011	The Mirror Never Lies	Line producer
2012	Hi5teria	Line producer
2015	Chaotic Love Poems	Assistant producer
2015	Following Diana	Short film Line producer
2016	Nyai	Producer
2016	Memoria	Short film Producer
2017	Marlina the Murderer in Four Acts	Line producer
2017	Moon Cake Story	Assistant producer
2018	The Seen and Unseen	Producer
2019	Laundry Show	Assistant producer
2021	Bara: The Flame	Producer
2021	Preman	Assistant producer
2021	Ali & Ratu Ratu Queens	Line producer
2022	Before, Now & Then	Producer
2022	Daybreak	Short film Producer
2024	Samsara	Producer
2025	On Your Lap	Producer
2026	The Sea Speaks His Name	Producer
