= Two Blue Hearts =

- Theatrical release poster
- Indonesian: Dua Hati Biru
- Directed by: Gina S. Noer; Dinna Jasanti
- Screenplay by: Gina S. Noer
- Produced by: Chand Parwez Servia; Gina S. Noer; Riza; Sigit Pratama
- Starring: Angga Yunanda; Aisha Nurra Datau; Farrell Rafisqy; Cut Mini; Arswendy Bening Swara
- Cinematography: Irmawan Kelana
- Edited by: Aline Jusria; Sastha Sunu
- Music by: Hariopati Rinanto; Tofan Iskandar
- Production companies: Kharisma Starvision Plus; Wahana Kreator
- Distributed by: Antenna Entertainments (Malaysia)
- Release date: April 17, 2024 (Indonesia)
- Running time: 106 minutes
- Country: lIndonesia
- Language: Indonesian

Two Blue Hearts (Indonesian: Dua Hati Biru) is 2024 Indonesian family drama film directed by Gina S. Noer and Dinna Jasanti. The film is a sequel to Two Blue Stripes, starring Angga Yunanda, Aisha Nurra Datau (replacing Adhisty Zara from previous film), and the child actor Farrell Rafisqy. Two Blue Hearts premiered in Indonesian cinemas on 17 April 2024.

== Synopsis ==
The story of Bima and Dara continues. A young couple who were once married because of a mistake. Four years have passed, and Dara decides to return to Jakarta and reunite with her small family, Bima and Adam. Separated since Adam was born, Dara must try to get closer to her child despite various problems in her household.

== Cast ==
- Angga Yunanda as Bima
- Aisha Nurra Datau as Dara Yunika
- Farrell Rafisqy as Adam
- Cut Mini as Yuni
- Arswendy Bening Swara as Rudy
- Lulu Tobing as Rika
- Keanu Angelo as Iqi
- Maisha Kanna as Putri (Puput)
- Rachel Amanda as Dewi
- Shakira Jasmine as Vini
- Princess Ayudya as Inti
- Tenno Ali as Rizal
- Reni Setyowati as Ika
- Aurora Ribero as Lisa (from Like & Share)

== Reception ==
Two Blue Hearts was released in Indonesian cinemas on 17 April 2024. It attracted 75,018 admissions on its first day. It garnered a total of 503,220 admissions during its theatrical run.
