= Petualangan Sherina 2 =

2023 family musical film by Riri Riza

- Theatrical release poster
- Directed by: Riri Riza
- Screenplay by: Jujur Prananto; Mira Lesmana; Riri Riza; Virania Munaf
- Story by: Jujur Prananto; Mira Lesmana; Riri Riza; Virania Munaf; Sherina Munaf
- Produced by: Mira Lesmana
- Starring: Sherina Munaf; Derby Romero
- Cinematography: Yadi Sugandi
- Edited by: Aline Jusria
- Music by: Sherina Munaf
- Production companies: Miles Films; BASE Entertainment
- Release date: 28 September 2023 (Indonesia)
- Running time: 126 minutes
- Country: Indonesia
- Language: Indonesian
- Budget: Rp20 billion

Petualangan Sherina 2 (lit. 'Sherina's Adventure 2') is a 2023 Indonesian family musical action-adventure film directed by Riri Riza and produced by Mira Lesmana. It is a sequel of the 2000 film Petualangan Sherina. Sherina Munaf and Derby Romero reprised their roles from the first film, with Ardit Erwandha, Chandra Satria, Randy Danistha, Kelly Tandiono, Quinn Salman, and Isyana Sarasvati joining the ensemble cast.

Initially announced in 2020, the production had been delayed due to the COVID-19 pandemic. The film was released in Indonesian theatres on 28 September 2023. It received five nominations at the 2024 Indonesian Film Festival.

== Premise ==
Sherina, now a journalist, gets reunited with Sadam, now a program manager in a conservation non-governmental organization in the Kalimantan forest. They are tasked to reunite an infant orangutan to its parents.

== Cast ==
- Sherina Munaf as Sherina Darmawan
- Derby Romero as Sadam Ardiwilaga
- Ardit Erwandha as Aryo
- Quinn Salman as Sindai
- Isyana Sarasvati as Ratih Syailendra
- Chandra Satria as Ferdy Syailendra
- Kelly Tandiono as Pingkan
- Randy Danistha as Dedi
- Mathias Muchus as Mr. Darmawan
- Ucie Nurul as Mrs. Darmawan

== Production ==
=== Pre-production ===
In September 2020, Miles Films posted a video, hinting a possible sequel of the 2000 film Petualangan Sherina. The sequel was confirmed by director Riri Riza and producer Mira Lesmana during a virtual press conference. The idea of the sequel was conceived when Lesmana and Sherina Munaf met to discuss a project to reboot the first film with a new child actor. Although Lesmana offered Munaf the role of music director, the latter had a different vision for creating a sequel. Munaf stated that the screenplay had been developed since November 2019. It was inspired by her experience as a volunteer at the Borneo Orangutan Survival Foundation, where she participated in the release of orangutans into the wild forests of Kalimantan. The screenplay was completed in December 2020.

Petualangan Sherina 2 was planned for production and release in 2020. But, the production had been halted due to the COVID-19 pandemic. The film was scheduled to start filming during April to June 2021 and release at the end of the year. However, the plans were delayed due to the rising number of positive COVID-19 cases. Talamedia, Legacy Pictures, Lamunan Studios, INFIA, Folkative, Volix and Folk co-financed the film.

=== Casting ===
Sherina Munaf and Derby Romero was confirmed to reprise their roles in the film as Sherina and Sadam, respectively. In November 2022, it was announced that Ardit Erwandha, Chandra Satria, Randy Danistha, Kelly Tandiono, Quinn Salman, and Isyana Sarasvati joined the ensemble cast. It was also announced that Mathias Muchus and Ucie Nurul would reprise their roles as Sherina's parents. Riza stated that Salman was cast in the film due to her portrayal of Sherina in the stage musical adaptation. This marks Salman's debut feature film.

=== Principal photography ===
The principal photography took place in Jakarta and Palangka Raya, Central Kalimantan. It began in December 2022 and wrapped in March 2023.

== Release ==
Petualangan Sherina 2 was released in Indonesian theatres on 28 September 2023. It garnered 256,286 admissions on its release date. It gathered a million admissions during its first week. It garnered a total of 2,414,504 admission during its theatrical run.

The film was screened at the 18th Jogja-NETPAC Asian Film Festival during the Bioskop Bisik section, a whispering cinema program specifically intended for people with visual impairment. Amazon Prime Video acquired the film's distribution, releasing it on 7 March 2024.

== Accolades ==
| Award / Film Festival | Date of ceremony | Category | Recipient(s) | Result | Ref. |
|---|---|---|---|---|---|
| Festival Film Bandung | 9 November 2024 | Highly Commended Film | Petualangan Sherina 2 | Nominated | |
| Festival Film Bandung | 9 November 2024 | Highly Commended Director | Riri Riza | Won | |
| Festival Film Bandung | 9 November 2024 | Highly Commended Supporting Actress | Isyana Sarasvati | Nominated | |
| Festival Film Bandung | 9 November 2024 | Highly Commended Cinematography | Yadi Sugandi | Won | |
| Festival Film Bandung | 9 November 2024 | Highly Commended Editing | Aline Jusria | Nominated | |
| Festival Film Bandung | 9 November 2024 | Highly Commended Original Score | Sherina Munaf | Won | |
| Indonesian Film Festival | 20 November 2024 | Best Adapted Screenplay | Jujur Prananto, Mira Lesmana, Riri Riza, and Virania Munaf | Won | |
| Indonesian Film Festival | 20 November 2024 | Best Sound | Aria Prayogi and Yusuf Patawari | Nominated | |
| Indonesian Film Festival | 20 November 2024 | Best Original Score | Sherina Munaf | Nominated | |
| Indonesian Film Festival | 20 November 2024 | Best Theme Song | Sherina Munaf, Mira Lesmana, and Virania Munaf for "Mengenang Bintang" | Nominated | |
| Indonesian Film Festival | 20 November 2024 | Best Art Direction | Eros Eflin | Nominated | |
| Anugerah Musik Indonesia | 4 December 2024 | Best Film Score Album | Sherina Munaf for Original Score from Petualangan Sherina 2 | Won | |
| Anugerah Musik Indonesia | 4 December 2024 | Best Musical Album | Petualangan Sherina 2: Original Motion Picture Soundtrack | Nominated | |
| Anugerah Musik Indonesia | 4 December 2024 | Best Production Work for Visual Media Soundtrack | Sherina Munaf for "Mengenang Bintang" | Nominated | |
