= Two Blue Stripes =

- Indonesian release poster
- Indonesian: Dua Garis Biru
- Directed by: Gina S. Noer
- Written by: Gina S. Noer
- Produced by: Chand Parwez Servia; Fiaz Servia
- Starring: Angga Yunanda; Zara JKT48; Cut Mini; Arswendy Bening Swara; Dwi Sasono; Lulu Tobing; Rachel Amanda; Maisha Kanna
- Cinematography: Padri Nadeak
- Edited by: Aline Jusria
- Music by: Andhika Triyadi
- Production companies: StarVision Plus; Wahana Kreator Nusantara
- Release dates: 11 July 2019 (Indonesia); 3 October 2019 (Malaysia & Brunei); 10 October 2019 (Singapore)
- Running time: 113 minutes
- Country: Indonesia
- Language: Indonesian
- Box office: Rp70 billion ($4.88 million)

Two Blue Stripes (Indonesian: Dua Garis Biru) is a 2019 Indonesian teen drama film directed by Gina S. Noer and produced by Starvision Plus. The film mainly deals with teen pregnancy and features Angga Yunanda and Zara JKT48 in starring roles.

== Plot ==
Bima and Dara are a high school couple, one financially and academically lower than the other. One day, Dara brings him to her house, and in a fit of enjoyment, they kiss and have sex. When Dara tests positive for pregnancy, the couple begins distancing each other. Bima suggests aborting the fetus, but Dara insists in keeping it. They agree on secreting it up to graduation, but one day a basketball hits Dara's head, and she wails "What about the baby?!" They are confronted by each others' parents and Dara is expelled. At a doctor's checkup, they learn that teenage pregnancies are highly risky.

Dara's younger sister Putri reveals their parents' plan on handing the baby to their mother Rika's relatives who have been struggling with pregnancy, concerned about her parental capability. She confronts them but to no avail. Dara and Bima marry; Bima works as the restaurant of Dara's father David, but he is allowed to leave in order to pursue high school. At a checkup, they learn the baby is a boy who Bima's mother Yuni names Adam. Discussing a possible adoption, Dara's parents agree as Dara plans on going to South Korea for college and considering the parental burden, but Bima's parents argue that the burden is destined.

Dara prepares memorabilia for older Adam with a letter. After insisting on giving Adam to Bima, she performs delivery which is a success, but results in uterine postpartum bleeding which requires removal of it. After being discharged, Bima and Dara hug and leave with their respective parents.

== Cast ==
- Angga Yunanda as Bima
- Zara JKT48 as Dara
- Dwi Sasono as Dara's father
- Lulu Tobing as Dara's mother
- Cut Mini as Bima's mother
- Arswendy Bening Swara as Bima's father
- Rachel Amanda as Dewi

== Release ==
It was released on 11 July 2019, alongside Follow Me to Hell and Iqro: My Universe, and debuted with 178,000 audiences. Dua Garis Biru became the second Indonesia's most-watched film in 2019 with a total of 2,538,473 audiences, grossing over IDR 70 billion. It was also released in Malaysia, Singapore, and Brunei later that year. A sequel, Two Blue Hearts released on 17 April 2024.

== Reception ==
The film is critically acclaimed for its writing and acting and has been nominated for 26 different awards and categories, winning ten of them.
