= Chaotic Love Poems =

- Theatrical poster
- Indonesian: Aach... Aku Jatuh Cinta
- Directed by: Garin Nugroho
- Written by: Garin Nugroho
- Starring: Chicco Jerikho; Pevita Pearce
- Release date: 4 February 2016 (IFFR)
- Running time: 85 minutes
- Country: Indonesia
- Language: Indonesian

Chaotic Love Poems (Indonesian: Aach... Aku Jatuh Cinta, lit. 'Aach... I'm falling in love') is a 2016 Indonesian comedy-drama film directed by Garin Nugroho.
