= Aghniny Haque =

Indonesian taekwondo athlete (born 1997)

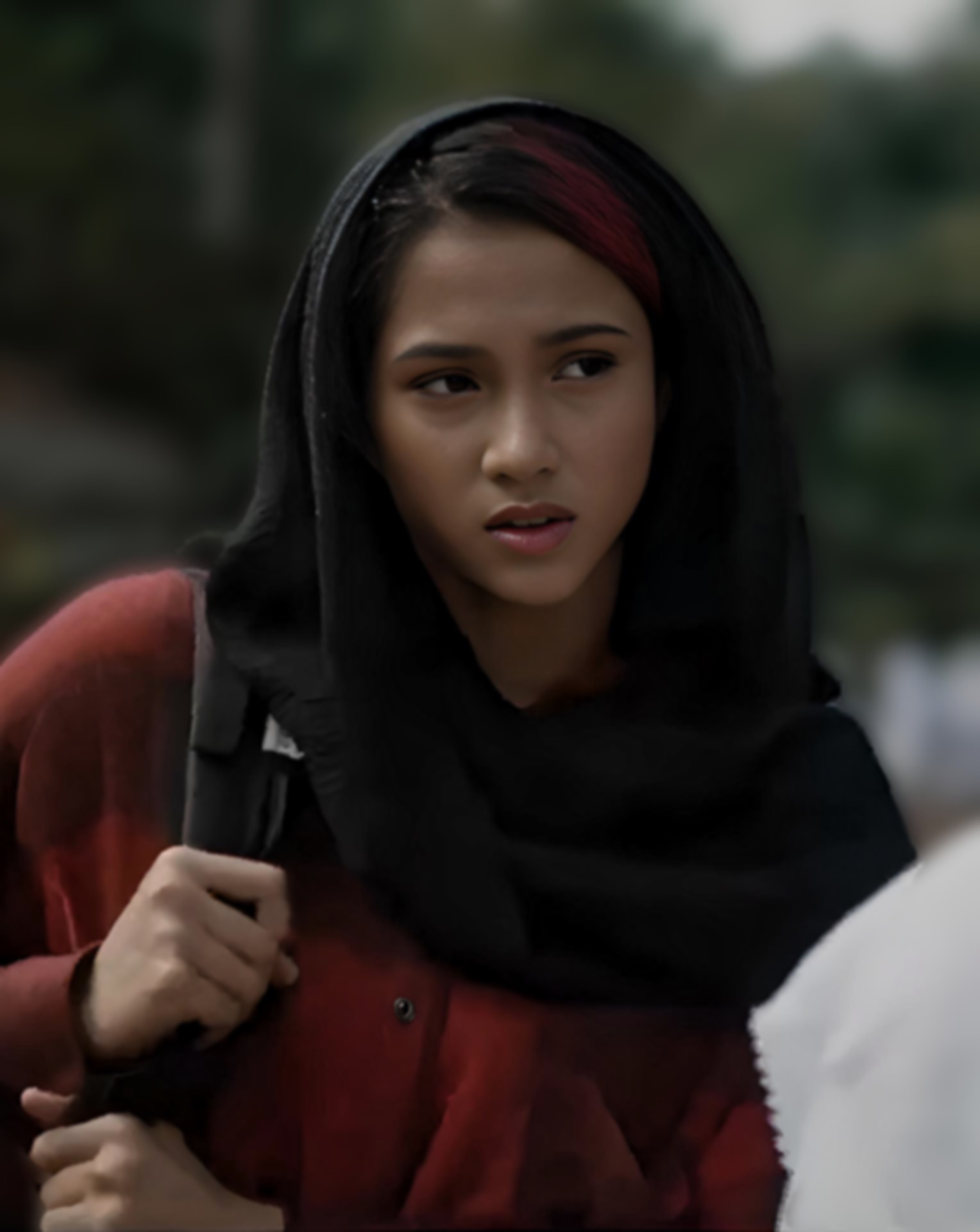
- Aghniny Haque in 2022 Qorin
- Born: 8 March 1997 (age 29); Semarang, Central Java, Indonesia
- Education: Semarang University (dropped out)
- Occupations: Actress; model
- Years active: 2011–2016 (taekwondo athlete); 2018–present (actress)
- Sports career
- Weight: 46 kg (101 lb)
- Country: Indonesia
- Sport: Taekwondo
Medal record
Women's taekwondo
Representing Indonesia
Asian Championships
Silver medal – second place	2014 Tashkent	−46 kg
Islamic Solidarity Games
Gold medal – first place	2013 Palembang	−46 kg
SEA Games
Bronze medal – third place	2013 Naypyidaw	−46 kg

Aghniny Haque (born 8 March 1997) is an Indonesian actress, model and a former taekwondo athlete.

== Early life and career ==
=== 1997–2016: Early life and taekwondo practitioning ===
Aghniny Haque was born on 8 March 1997 in Semarang, Central Java, Indonesia, to Suryono R. Permono and Asma Farida. An only child, she grew up in her hometown.

Aghniny was part of the Indonesian national taekwondo team in 2011 before being relegated from national training in 2016 due to a knee injury. During her career as an athlete, she has won several awards, such as winning a bronze medal in the 2013 SEA Games held in Myanmar, winning a silver medal in the Asian taekwondo championship held in Tashkent, Uzbekistan in 2014, winning a gold medal in the Hong Kong Open and also the Thailand Open for the youth category, and contributed a gold medal when participating in the Islamic Solidarity Games III competition in Palembang.

=== 2018–present: Acting ===
In 2018, after her career as a taekwondo athlete stopped, Aghniny returned to Semarang and tried to explore the world of acting by participating in the film selection Wiro Sableng: Pendekar Kapak Maut Naga Geni 212. She managed to get the role of Rara Murni and started her career as an actress since then.

After her acting debut, Aghniny returned to appear in several Indonesian cinema films, such as Wedding Agreement (2019), Impetigore (2019), Habibie & Ainun 3 (2019), KKN di Desa Penari (2022), Stealing Raden Saleh (2022), and Tuhan Izinkan Aku Berdosa (2023).
