= Arswendy Bening Swara =

Indonesian actor

- Born: Arswendy Bening Swara Nasution; 22 November 1957 (age 68)
- Other name: Arswendy Nasution
- Occupations: Actor; acting coach
- Years active: 1982–present

Arswendy Bening Swara Nasution (born 22 November 1957) is an Indonesian actor and acting coach. He has received various accolades, including three Citra Awards nominations. In 2022, he received the Best Actor award at the Marrakech International Film Festival for his role in Autobiography.

== Career ==
Swara attended the Institut Kesenian Jakarta, graduating in 1982. Since then, he had become active in Putu Wijaya's theater collective Teater Mandiri. He made his on-screen acting debut in Sjumandjaja's Opera Jakarta (1985).

Since the 2000s, he had also served as an acting coach for films, including Denias, Senandung Di Atas Awan, King and Merah Putih, among others.

== Selected filmography ==
- Opera Jakarta (1985)
- Dead Time: Kala (2007) as Haryo Wibowo
- The Dancer (2011) as Marsusi
- Shackled (2012) as Josef
- The Clerics (2013) as Abdul Wahab Hasbullah
- 3 Nafas Likas (2013) as Ngantari Tarigan
- Satan's Slaves (2017) as Ustad
- Two Blue Stripes (2019) as Rudy
- Gundala (2019) as Ferry Dani
- One Day We'll Talk About Today (2020) as dr. Bambang
- Missing Home (2022) as Domu
- Before, Now & Then (2022) as Darga
- Autobiography (2022) as Purnawinata
- Khanzab (2023) as Sentot Wibisono
- Grave Torture (2024) as Pandi Hakim
- The Shadow Strays (2024) as Soemitro
- Tale of the Land (2024) as Tuha
- Lost in the Spotlight (2025) as Sudibyo
- Ghost in the Cell (2026) as Prakasa
- The Sea Speaks His Name (2026) as Arya Wibisana
