= List of 2025 box office number-one films in Indonesia =

This is a list of films which placed number one at the weekend box office for the year 2025 in Indonesia with the weekly admissions.

== Number-one films ==
†	This implies the highest-grossing movie of the year.

#	Weekend end date	Film	Weekly admissions	Weekend openings in the Top 10	Ref.
1	5 January 2025	2nd Miracle In Cell No. 7	789,309	The Prosecutor (#5); Utusan Iblis: Dia Yang Berada di Antara Kita (#8)	
2	12 January 2025	The Deceased	335,721	Den of Thieves 2: Pantera (#6); Ambyar Mak Byar (#7); Sleep Paralysis (#10)	
3	19 January 2025	The Deceased	299,772	The Devil's Bride (#2); 1 Imam 2 Makmum (#3); Wolf Man (#6); Eva: Pendakian Terakhir (#8)	
4	26 January 2025	Dark Nuns	361,902	A Brother and 7 Siblings (#3); The Last 7 Days (#4); The Miracle of a Woman's Tears (#5); Flight Risk (#8); Paddington in Peru (#10)	
5	2 February 2025	Dark Nuns	563,072	Perayaan Mati Rasa (#3); The Demon's Bride (#4); Woodwalkers (#10)	
6	9 February 2025	Haunting of Mount Gede	786,077	Nosferatu (#6); Pulung Gantung (#7); The Bayou (#10)	
7	16 February 2025	Haunting of Mount Gede	1,052,712	Captain America: Brave New World (#2); Attack on Titan: The Last Attack (#5); Love Is Never on Time (#6); Rumah Teteh: Story of Helena (#7)	
8	23 February 2025	Haunting of Mount Gede	582,862	Anak Kunti (#3); Cleaner (#7); You Are the Apple of My Eye (#9); The Secret Recipe (#10)	
9	2 March 2025	Haunting of Mount Gede	364,943	Legends of the Condor Heroes: The Gallants (#3); Iblis dalam Kandungan 2: Deception (#4); Conclave (#5); Interstellar (re-release) (#7); The Butterfly House (#9); Jagal Teluh (#10)	
9	9 March 2025	Haunting of Mount Gede	149,510	Mickey 17 (#3); The Monkey (#6); Setan Botak di Jembatan Ancol (#9); Desa Mati: The Movie (#10)	
10	16 March 2025	Haunting of Mount Gede	109,312	Singsot (#2); In the Lost Lands (#3); Invincible Swordsman (#4); Novocaine (#7)	
11	23 March 2025	Snow White	175,959	The Last Supper (#2); Ne Zha 2 (#3)	
12	30 March 2025	The Last Supper	361,579	A Working Man (#3)	
13	6 April 2025	Sugar Mill	2,286,369	Qodrat 2 (#2); Jumbo (#3); Komang (#4); Norma: Antara Mertua dan Menantu (#5)	
14	13 April 2025	Jumbo †	2,270,445	The Amateur (#8)	
15	20 April 2025	Jumbo †	2,661,736	The Siege at Thorn High (#4); Alie's Home (#6); Muslihat (#8); Sinners (#10)	
16	27 April 2025	Jumbo †	1,555,916	The Accountant 2 (#6); Mangku Pocong (#7); Until Dawn (#9); It's Official... (#10)	
17	4 May 2025	Jumbo †	1,196,327	Thunderbolts* (#2); Penjagal Iblis: Dosa Turunan (#4); Mendadak Dangdut (#5); This City Is a Battlefield (#6)	
18	11 May 2025	Jumbo †	604,154	Massacre of the Witches (#3); Broken Wings 2: Olivia (#6); Tabayyun (#8); Holy Night: Demon Hunters (#9)	
19	18 May 2025	Final Destination Bloodlines	938,449	Mission: Impossible – The Final Reckoning (sneak preview) (#5); Dasim (#7); Cocote Tonggo (#8); The Cursed of Satan Temptation (#10)	
20	25 May 2025	Mission: Impossible – The Final Reckoning	892,557	Lilo & Stitch (#3); The Concubine (#4)	
21	1 June 2025	Mission: Impossible – The Final Reckoning	773,212	Waktu Maghrib 2 (#2); Karate Kid: Legends (#4); Vengeance in the Dreary Night (#8); The Ritual (#10)	
22	8 June 2025	Mission: Impossible – The Final Reckoning	415,989	Ballerina (#2); Gowok: Javanese Kamasutra (#4); Tenung (#5); October Rhapsody (#7)	
23	15 June 2025	How to Train Your Dragon	477,757	GJLS: Ibuku Ibu-Ibu (#2); Gaza (#8); The Super Frugal Family (#10)	
24	22 June 2025	Jalan Pulang	763,689	28 Years Later (#4); Elio (#6); Assalamualaikum Beijing 2: Lost in Ningxia (#10)	
25	29 June 2025	Jalan Pulang	918,567	F1 the Movie (#3); Jodoh 3 Bujang (#4); Ejen Ali: The Movie 2 (#5); Lorong Kost (#7); M3GAN 2.0 (#8)	
26	6 July 2025	Jurassic World Rebirth	1,261,537	Narik Sukmo (#7); Agen +62 (#8); Arwah (#10)	
27	13 July 2025	Jurassic World Rebirth	818,972	Superman (#2); Sore: Wife from the Future (#4); Selepas Tahlil (#5)	
28	20 July 2025	Sore: Wife from the Future	1,108,919	The Book of Sijjin and Illiyyin (#3); Assalamualaikum Baitullah (#5); I Know What You Did Last Summer (#8); Smurfs (#9)	
29	27 July 2025	The Fantastic Four: First Steps	805,523	Believe: The Ultimate Battle (#3); Kampung Jabang Mayit: Ritual Maut (#6); Doti: Tumbal Ilmu Hitam (#9); Ghost Train (#10)	
30	3 August 2025	Sore: Wife from the Future	510,859	Sihir Pelakor (#4); Take Me to Hell (#5); Bertaut Rindu (#10)	
31	10 August 2025	Weapons	328,744	Call Me Dad (#2); Pamali: Tumbal (#5); Lyora: Penantian Buah Hati (#9); My Daughter Is a Zombie (#10)	
32	17 August 2025	Demon Slayer: Kimetsu no Yaiba – The Movie: Infinity Castle	1,191,300	La Tahzan (#4); Better Off Dead (#9)	
33	24 August 2025	Demon Slayer: Kimetsu no Yaiba – The Movie: Infinity Castle	910,299	The Shadow's Edge (#3); Labinak: They Are Almost Us (#6); Only Your Name in My Prayer (#8); Materialists (#9)	
34	31 August 2025	Demon Slayer: Kimetsu no Yaiba – The Movie: Infinity Castle	274,751	Pencarian Terakhir (#4); Dracula (#8); Lebih dari Selamanya (#10)	
35	7 September 2025	The Conjuring: Last Rites	1,923,000	Andai Ibu Tidak Menikah Dengan Ayah (#2); Menjelang Magrib 2 (#5); Jujutsu Kaisen: Hidden Inventory / Premature Death – The Movie (#9	
36	14 September 2025	The Conjuring: Last Rites	1,067,323	Sukma (#3); Gereja Setan (#4); Mama: Pesan dari Neraka (#6); The Long Walk (#9)	
37	21 September 2025	Sukma	437,326	Jadi Tuh Bang (#4); Perempuan Pembawa Sial (#5); Maryam: Janji dan Jiwa yang Terikat (#7); Detective Conan: One-eyed Flashback (#8); Afterburn (#9)	
38	28 September 2025	Kang Solah from Kang Mak x Nenek Gayung	656,447	One Battle After Another (#5); A Woman Called Mother (#6); Chainsaw Man – The Movie: Reze Arc (#7); Dilanjutkan Salah Disudahi Perih (#10)	
39	5 October 2025	Kang Solah from Kang Mak x Nenek Gayung	806,111	Rangga & Cinta (#3); Twisted Fate (#4); Avatar: The Way of Water (re-release) (#7); Rest Area (#8)	
40	12 October 2025	Kang Solah from Kang Mak x Nenek Gayung	509,890	Tron: Ares (#3); Jembatan Shiratal Mustaqim (#4); Yakin Nikah (#6)	
41	19 October 2025	Rangga & Cinta	249,954	Black Blood (#3); Black Phone 2 (#6); Jangan Panggil Mama Kafir (#7); The Cursed (#9)	
42	26 October 2025	Kang Solah from Kang Mak x Nenek Gayung	140,297	Tumbal Darah (#2); Air Mata di Ujung Sajadah 2 (#5); Maju Seram Mundur Horor (#6); Stolen Girl (#7)	
43	2 November 2025	Shutter	153,049	The Ultimate Actor (#6); Pengin Hijrah (#8)	
44	9 November 2025	Sosok Ketiga: Lintrik	375,228	Predator: Badlands (#2); On Your Lap (#3); Kuncen (#7); The First Ride (#9)	
45	16 November 2025	Sampai Titik Terakhirmu	450,806	Now You See Me: Now You Don't (#2); Pesugihan Sate Gagak (#4); Dopamine (#7); The Running Man (#8)	
46	23 November 2025	Sampai Titik Terakhirmu	613,541	Wicked: For Good (#2); The Verdict (#7); Danyang Wingit Jumat Kliwon (#8)	
47	30 November 2025	Agak Laen: Menyala Pantiku!	1,825,342	Zootopia 2 (#2); Smothered (#8); Air Mata Mualaf (#9)	
48	7 December 2025	Agak Laen: Menyala Pantiku!	3,475,760	Five Nights at Freddy's 2 (#4); Riba (#5); Wasiat Warisan (#6); Jujutsu Kaisen: Shibuya Incident x The Culling Game Advance Screening – The Movie (#7); Ozora: Penganiayaan Brutal Penguasa Jaksel (#9)	
49	14 December 2025	Agak Laen: Menyala Pantiku!	2,185,234	Qorin 2 (#3); Mertua Ngeri Kali (#4); Mengejar Restu (#7)	
50	21 December 2025	Avatar: Fire and Ash	1,969,561	Timur (#3)	
51	28 December 2025	Avatar: Fire and Ash	2,339,237	Janur Ireng: Sewu Dino the Prequel (#3); Comic 8 Revolution: Santet K4bin3t (#4); The SpongeBob Movie: Search for SquarePants (#5); Patah Hati Yang Kupilih (#8); Anaconda (#9)	

== Highest-grossing films ==
International film Indonesian film

Highest-grossing films of 2025 (In year release)
Rank	Title	Total admissions
1	Jumbo	10,233,002
2	Agak Laen: Menyala Pantiku!	10,010,635
3	Avatar: Fire and Ash	4,844,738
4	Sugar Mill	4,726,760
5	The Conjuring: Last Rites	3,478,416
6	Haunting of Mount Gede	3,242,843
7	Sore: Istri dari Masa Depan	3,119,896
8	Komang	3,002,303
9	Jalan Pulang	2,879,216
10	Kang Solah from Kang Mak x Nenek Gayung	2,507,452

== Milestones ==
=== Films exceeding one million admissions ===
International film Indonesian film Final number from 2026

No.	Film	Date	Days	Total admissions	Ref.
1	Dark Nuns	5 February 2025	13	1,088,009	
2	A Brother and 7 Siblings	8 February 2025	17	1,237,043	
3	Perayaan Mati Rasa	10 February 2025	13	1,374,330	
4	Haunting of Mount Gede	11 February 2025	6	3,242,843	
5	Captain America: Brave New World	19 February 2025	8	1,627,308	
6	Sugar Mill	3 April 2025	4	4,726,760	
7	Qodrat 2	6 April 2025	7	2,214,441	
8	Jumbo	6 April 2025	7	10,233,002	
9	Komang	8 April 2025	9	3,002,303	
10	The Siege at Thorn High	26 April 2025	10	1,892,369	
11	Thunderbolts*	10 May 2025	10	1,485,938	
12	Final Destination Bloodlines	18 May 2025	6 (Note: Including two days of sneak preview.)	1,753,681	
13	Mission: Impossible – The Final Reckoning	25 May 2025	7 (Note: Including three days of sneak preview.)	2,490,000	
14	How to Train Your Dragon	23 June 2025	12	1,462,720	
15	Jalan Pulang	25 June 2025	6	2,879,216	
16	Jurassic World Rebirth	5 July 2025	4	2,425,552	
17	Superman	17 July 2025	8	1,627,531	
18	Sore: Wife from the Future	19 July 2025	10	3,119,896	
19	The Fantastic Four: First Steps	1 August 2025	10	1,337,387	
20	Believe: Takdir, Mimpi, Keberanian	15 August 2025	23	1,038,688	
21	Demon Slayer: Kimetsu no Yaiba – The Movie: Infinity Castle	17 August 2025	3	2,504,705	
22	Weapons	31 August 2025	26	1,023,947	
23	The Conjuring: Last Rites	5 September 2025	3	3,478,416	
24	Sukma	28 September 2025	18	1,011,679	
25	Kang Solah from Kang Mak x Nenek Gayung	2 October 2025	8	2,507,452	
26	Sampai Titik Terakhirmu	23 November 2025	11	1,555,652	
27	Agak Laen: Menyala Pantiku!	30 November 2025	3	11,000,866	
28	Zootopia 2	12 December 2025	17	1,783,533	
29	Avatar: Fire and Ash	19 December 2025	3	6,267,893	
30	Janur Ireng: Sewu Dino the Prequel	6 January 2026	12	1,345,793	

=== Films exceeding two million admissions ===
No.	Film	Date	Days	Ref.
1	Haunting of Mount Gede	19 February 2025	13	
2	Sugar Mill	5 April 2025	6	
3	Jumbo	10 April 2025	11	
4	Komang	14 April 2025	15	
5	Qodrat 2	15 April 2025	16	
6	Mission: Impossible – The Final Reckoning	2 June 2025	15	
7	Jalan Pulang	3 July 2025	14	
8	Jurassic World Rebirth	13 July 2025	12	
9	Sore: Wife from the Future	27 July 2025	17	
10	Demon Slayer: Kimetsu no Yaiba – The Movie: Infinity Castle	23 August 2025	9	
11	The Conjuring: Last Rites	8 September 2025	6	
12	Kang Solah from Kang Mak x Nenek Gayung	12 October 2025	18	
13	Agak Laen: Menyala Pantiku!	1 December 2025	4	
14	Avatar: Fire and Ash	21 December 2025	5	

=== Films exceeding three million admissions ===
No.	Film	Date	Days	Ref.
1	Haunting of Mount Gede	13 March 2025	36	
2	Sugar Mill	10 April 2025	11	
3	Jumbo	13 April 2025	14	
4	Komang	11 July 2025	102	
5	Sore: Wife from the Future	14 August 2025	36	
6	The Conjuring: Last Rites	15 August 2025	13	
7	Agak Laen: Menyala Pantiku!	3 December 2025	7	
8	Avatar: Fire and Ash	24 December 2025	7	

=== Films exceeding four million admissions ===
No.	Film	Date	Days	Ref.
1	Sugar Mill	15 April 2025	16	
2	Jumbo	16 April 2025	17	
3	Agak Laen: Menyala Pantiku!	5 December 2025	9	
4	Avatar: Fire and Ash	27 December 2025	10	

=== Films exceeding five million admissions ===
No.	Film	Date	Days	Ref.
1	Jumbo	19 April 2025	20	
2	Agak Laen: Menyala Pantiku!	7 December 2025	11	
3	Avatar: Fire and Ash	1 January 2026	16	

=== Films exceeding six million admissions ===
No.	Film	Date	Days	Ref.
1	Jumbo	21 April 2025	22	
2	Agak Laen: Menyala Pantiku!	10 December 2025	14	
3	Avatar: Fire and Ash	12 January 2026	27	

=== Films exceeding seven million admissions ===
No.	Film	Date	Days	Ref.
1	Jumbo	26 April 2025	27	
2	Agak Laen: Menyala Pantiku!	13 December 2025	17	

=== Films exceeding eight million admissions ===
No.	Film	Date	Days	Ref.
1	Jumbo	1 May 2025	32	
2	Agak Laen: Menyala Pantiku!	17 December 2025	21	

=== Films exceeding nine million admissions ===
No.	Film	Date	Days	Ref.
1	Jumbo	10 May 2025	41	
2	Agak Laen: Menyala Pantiku!	24 December 2025	27	

=== Films exceeding ten million admissions ===
No.	Film	Date	Days	Ref.
1	Jumbo	30 May 2025	60	
2	Agak Laen: Menyala Pantiku!	31 December 2025	35	

== See also ==
- List of highest-grossing films in Indonesia

Preceded by 2024	2025	Succeeded by 2026
