= Sheila Dara Aisha =

Indonesian actress and singer (born 1992)

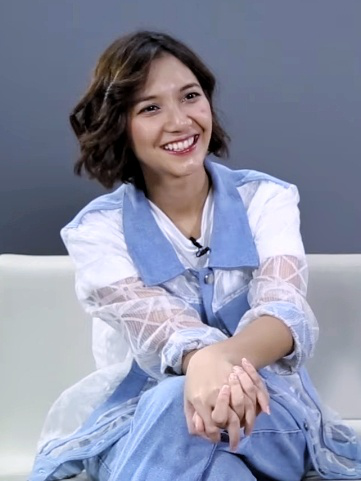
- Aisha in 2020
- Born: 24 September 1992 (age 33); Bandung, West Java, Indonesia
- Other name: Baby
- Education: University of Indonesia; SMA Negeri 8 Jakarta
- Occupations: Actress; singer; model; entrepreneur
- Years active: 2000–present
- Spouse: Vidi Aldiano (m. 2022; died 2026)
- Musical career
- Genres: Pop; R&B
- Instruments: Vocal; piano
- Labels: BNP; WannaB

Sheila Dara Aisha (born 24 September 1992) is an Indonesian actress and singer. She won her first Citra Award for Best Supporting Actress for her performance in Falling In Love Like In Movies at the 2024 Indonesian Film Festival. A year later, she received a Citra Award for Best Actress for her performance as the title character in Sore: A Wife from the Future.

== Early life ==
Sheila Dara Aisha was born in Bandung on 24 September 1992. Her younger brother, Muhammad Faishal Tanjung, is a musician and keyboardist of alternative pop band Voxxes. Aisha attended University of Indonesia, majoring in communication studies, graduating in 2013.

== Career ==
Aisha started her career when she was eight years old by joining the trio Arvaby and singing the jingle for a McDonald's Happy Meal advertisement. One of her earliest work was when she sung the Indonesian soundtrack version for the Crayon Shin-chan anime. She then made her acting debut in a small role in 2000 soap opera Bidadari. In 2008, she released an extended play Cinta Terlarang, under her moniker Baby, produced by Dewiq.

In 2013, she had her debut feature film acting as Ika in Monty Tiwa's Romantini. In 2014, she starred in two films directed by Raditya Dika, Malam Minggu Miko Movie and Pink Guinea Pig. In 2020, she formed a duo with singer-songwriter Donne Maula and released a single titled "Tak Terima". She starred as Aurora in a 2020 family drama film One Day We'll Talk About Today, also its 2023 sequel A Long Way to Come Home which follows Aurora's obstacles during her studies in London. In 2021, she landed her first leading role as Tika in Ernest Prakasa's mystery drama Teka-Teki Tika. In 2022, she starred as Yulinar in an adaptation of 1996 soap opera of the same name, The Red Point of Marriage. For her performance, she received her first Citra Award nomination for Citra Award for Best Supporting Actress at the 2022 Indonesian Film Festival. She starred as Dara, alongside Dion Wiyoko and Reza Rahadian in Disney+ Hotstar series What We Lose to Love, created by Yandy Laurens.

In 2023, she reunited with Wiyoko and Laurens in the latter's romantic drama film Falling In Love Like In Movies. Aisha won the Citra Award for Best Supporting Actress for her performance in the film at the 2024 Indonesian Film Festival.

== Personal life ==
In January 2022, Aisha married singer Vidi Aldiano in Jakarta.

== Filmography ==
=== Film ===
Year	Title	Role	Notes
2013	Twit(love)War	Rani	Short film
2013	Romantini	Ika	
2014	Marmut Merah Jambu	Dara	
2014	Malam Minggu Miko Movie	Dira	
2014	Aku, Kau & KUA	Wanda	
2016	Sabtu Bersama Bapak	Ayu	
2016	Surat Untukmu	Tiara	
2017	The Chocolate Chance	Fidela	
2018	R: Raja, Ratu & Rahasia	Trixie	
2019	Bridezilla	Key	
2019	The Queen of Black Magic	Siti	
2019	Eggnoid	Ran	
2020	One Day We'll Talk About Today	Aurora Narendra Putri	
2021	Eyang Putri	Gendis	
2021	Teka-teki Tika	Tika	
2021	Konfabulasi	Ria	Short film
2021	Kita Tak Bisa Ke Mana-Mana Lagi	Gigi	Short film
2022	Gara-Gara Warisan	Vega	
2022	Miracle in Cell No. 7	Teacher	
2022	The Red Point of Marriage	Yulinar	
2022	Spirited	Kuntilanak	
2023	A Long Way to Come Home	Aurora Narendra Putri	
2023	Falling In Love Like In Movies	Cheline	
2024	Home Garden	Mar	Short film
2024	Heartbreak Motel	Lara	
2024	Start Up Never Give Up	Dewi	
2025	The Most Beautiful Girl in the World	Kiara	
2025	A Brother and 7 Siblings	Senior Architect	Cameo
2025	Sore: Istri dari Masa Depan	Sore	
2025	Lost in the Spotlight	Sheila	

=== Television ===
Year	Title	Role	Network	Notes
2001	Bidadari	Lala's friend	RCTI	
2013	Lolly Love	Lolly	Trans TV	
2013	BIMA Satria Garuda	Sisil	RCTI	
2013	Cinta Yang Sama	Joya	SCTV	
2015	Ganteng-Ganteng Serigala	Michelle	SCTV	
2015–2016	Stereo	Dhana	NET.	
2017	The Publicist	Uli	Viu	
2018	Sunshine	Bumi	Viu	
2018	Mengakhiri Cinta dalam 3 Episode	Ayu	YouTube	
2021	Jejak Rasa	Herself	YouTube	
2022	My New Rules of Journey	Herself	Vidio	
2022	What We Lose to Love	Dara Santini	Disney+ Hotstar	
2023	Cigarette Girl	Young Purwanti	Netflix	
2024	90 Hari Mencari Suami	Sari	Amazon Prime Video	

== Discography ==
=== Extended plays ===
As Baby

Title	Details
Cinta Terlarang	Released: 20 October 2008; Label: BNP Musik

=== Singles ===
Title	Year	Album
As Baby
"Cinta Terlarang"	2008	Cinta Terlarang
As Sheila Dara
"Saat Bersamamu"	2016	Non-album single
"Eggy"	2019	Eggnoid – Original Motion Picture Soundtrack
"Tak Terima" (with Donne Maula)	2020	Non-album singles
"Teruntuk Jiwa Yang Kupuja" (with Donne Maula)	2020	Non-album singles
"Peka" (with Donne Maula)	2021	Non-album singles
"Malas" (with Donne Maula)	2022	Non-album singles
"Dengar Alam Bernyanyi" (with Laleilmanino, HIVI! & Chicco Jerikho)	2022	Non-album singles
