= Tobat Jatuh Cinta =

Indonesian comedy drama television series

- Genre: Romantic comedy Slice of life
- Screenplay by: Fahri Asiza
- Directed by: Asep Kusdinar
- Starring: Gisella Anastasia; Neneng Wulandari; Larasati Nugroho; Angbeen Rishi; Kenny Austin
- Country of origin: Indonesia
- Original language: Indonesian
- No. of seasons: 1
- No. of episodes: 34

Production
- Producer: Reno Marciano
- Camera setup: Multi-camera
- Production company: MNC Pictures

Original release
- Network: RCTI
- Release: 22 June – 25 July 2026

Tobat Jatuh Cinta is an Indonesian television series produced by MNC Pictures which aired from 22 June 2026 to 25 July 2026 on RCTI. It starring Gisella Anastasia, Neneng Wulandari, and Larasati Nugroho.

== Plot ==
Mila, a divorcee, had to rebuild her life after going through a divorce from her husband. The divorce was the result of his infidelity. However, Mila felt she wasn't alone.

She had rediscovered her strength in her three best friends. It turned out that all three of her close friends also shared the same status: widowhood. All three became widows from different backgrounds.

One of her friends, like Hasna, works as an online motorcycle taxi driver. There's also Elin, a salon owner who now longs for true love but is traumatized by domestic violence. Furthermore, Rora, a manipulative figure, seeks to prove her independence and craves validation.

== Cast ==
- Gisella Anastasia as Mila
- Neneng Wulandari as Hasna
- Larasati Nugroho as Elin
- Angbeen Rishi as Rora
- Kenny Austin as Bagas
- Lionil Hendrik as Jaka
- Oline Mendeng as Bunda Latifah
- Fajar Sadboy as Fajar
- Dini Hanipahm as Erika
- Anastasja Rina as Rosidah
- Dadang Sopyan as Mang Ihin
- Rully Fiss as Akbar
- Agus Mahesa as Efendy
- Krishna Keitaro as Adit
- Vin Batubara as Indra
- Hakim Ahmad as Mining
- Olivia Felicia as Marsha
- Ling Ling as Pungky
- Herry Ujang as Rocky
- Diaz Ardiawan as Wira
- Rezca Syam as Firmansyah
- Ayya Renita as Ayu

== Productions ==
=== Casting ===
Gisella Anastasia was confirmed for the role of Mila, and marks her return to television after an 8-year hiatus. Kenny Austin was finalized to play Bagas. Director Asep Kusdinar has announced Fajar Sadboy has been confirmed for the role of Fajar.
