= The Most Beautiful Girl in the World =

The Most Beautiful Girl in the World may refer to:

- "The Most Beautiful Girl in the World" (1935 song), 1935 song by Rodgers and Hart
- "The Most Beautiful Girl in the World" (Prince song), 1994 song by Prince
- The Most Beautiful Girl in the World (1938 film), a French comedy film
- The Most Beautiful Girl in the World (1951 film), a French comedy film
- The Most Beautiful Girl in the World (2018 film), a German film
- The Most Beautiful Girl in the World (2025 film), an Indonesian film
- "The Most Beautiful Girl", 1973 song written by Wilson, Sherrill and Rourke, and recorded by Charlie Rich
