= Selalu Ada Di Nadimu =

Single by Bunga Citra Lestari
- Language: Indonesian
- Released: 20 March 2025
- Label: Bash; Visinema
- Songwriter: Laleilmanino
- Producer: Laleilmanino

Jumbo singles chronology
"Kumpul Bocah" (2025)	"Selalu Ada Di Nadimu" (2025)	"Dengar Hatimu" (2025)

"Selalu Ada Di Nadimu" is a song written by Laleilmanino for the 2025 animated film Jumbo. Two versions of the song performed in this film: a ballad version sung by Bunga Citra Lestari as the voice of Don's mother, and a children's version sung by Prince Poetiray and Quinn Salman as the voices of Don and Meri, respectively. The version by BCL was released as a single on 20 March 2025 through Bash Music, followed by Poetiray and Salman's version released two weeks later.

== Background and composition ==
Laleilmanino wrote "Selalu Ada Di Nadimu" in 2021, while Prince Poetiray and Quinn Salman recorded a version of the song in 2022. Its lyrics described about wishing and heartwarming moments between parents and children. One of the songwriters, Nino Kayam, stated that the song was inspired by his father's death.

== Reception ==
"Selalu Ada Di Nadimu" was met with generally positive reviews by critics, who praised the song's arrangement. Liputan 6 described the song as "sweet, lovely and ear-catching".

== Commercial performance ==
=== Bunga Citra Lestari version ===
BCL's version of "Selalu Ada Di Nadimu" debuted at number nineteen on the Billboard Indonesia Songs chart dated 3 May 2025, then peaked at number seventeen on the chart dated 10 May and at number eleven on the chart dated 17 May.

=== Prince Poetiray and Quinn Salman version ===
Prince Poetiray and Quinn Salman's version of "Selalu Ada Di Nadimu" debuted at number nine on the Billboard Indonesia Songs chart dated 26 April 2025, then peaked at number three on the chart dated 3 May.

== Live performances ==
On 19 May 2025, BCL performed "Selalu Ada Di Nadimu" on the result and reunion show of Indonesian Idol season 13. On 2 August 2025, it became a "surprise song" on the sixteenth Simfoni Untuk Bangsa concert titled "8 Dekade Musik Indonesia". On 9 December, "Selalu Ada Di Nadimu" is included on the set list of Erwin Gutawa's Symphonesia: Viral concert.

== Charts ==
=== Bunga Citra Lestari version ===
Weekly chart performance for "Selalu Ada Di Nadimu"
Chart (2025)	Peak position
Indonesia (IFPI)	14
Indonesia (Billboard)	11

=== Prince Poetiray and Quinn Salman version ===
Weekly chart performance for "Selalu Ada Di Nadimu"
Chart (2025)	Peak position
Indonesia (IFPI)	5
Indonesia (Billboard)	3

== Other versions ==
In April 2025, TikTok influencer Elmerrybs uploaded a Korean cover of "Selalu Ada Di Nadimu" which went viral. Jumbo director Ryan Adriandhy reposted that video on his X account. The same month, Visinema announced a cover of the song by Ariel Noah.

== Awards and nominations ==
"Selalu Ada Di Nadimu" became the first song from an animated film to won 4 AMI Awards for Best Newcomer, Best Production Work for Visual Media, Best Children's Duo, Group or Collaboration, and Best Children's Songwriter. It was also nominated for Production Work of the Year, Best Music Director for Children's Songs, Best Collaboration Production Work and Best Record Producer categories at the same award. This song was also nominated for Citra Award for Best Theme Song at the 2025 Indonesian Film Festival, but lost to "Terbuang dalam Waktu" from Sore: Wife from the Future, leading to controversy. It was also nominated for Song of the Year, Collaboration of the Year and Songwriter of the Year at the 2025 Indonesian Music Awards.
