= Keluarga Cemara (franchise) =

Indonesian media franchise

- Created by: Arswendo Atmowiloto
- Original work: Keluarga Cemara (1996)
- Owner: Visinema Studios
- Years: 1996–present
- Based on: Keluarga Cemara by Arswendo Atmowiloto

Films and television
- Film(s): Cemara's Family (2019); Cemara's Family 2 (2019)
- Television series: Keluarga Cemara (1996); Keluarga Cemara: The Series (2022)

Theatrical presentations
- Musical(s): Keluarga Cemara (2024)

Keluarga Cemara is an Indonesian media franchise owned by Visinema Studios and created in 1996 by Arswendo Atmowiloto through his television series of the same name, for Atmo Chademas Persada and originally aired on RCTI on 6 October 1996. The series tells the story of a girl named Cemara, with her family, who moved to start a new life in a small town after her father's business in the city went bankrupt. The success of the series led to film adaptations, a spin-off television series, and a musical.

== Stage adaptations ==
In April 2024, it was reported that Visinema and Teman Musicals would adapt the original story into a musical under the title Panggung Musikal Keluarga Cemara, which debuted in June.
