= Falling in Love Like in Movies =

2023 film

Falling In Love Like In Movies
- Theatrical release poster
- Indonesian: Jatuh Cinta Seperti Di Film-Film
- Directed by: Yandy Laurens
- Written by: Yandy Laurens
- Produced by: Ernest Prakasa; Suryana Paramita
- Starring: Ringgo Agus Rahman; Nirina Zubir; Alex Abbad; Sheila Dara Aisha; Dion Wiyoko; Julie Estelle
- Cinematography: Dimas Bagus Triatma
- Edited by: Hendra Adhi Susanto
- Music by: Ofel Obaja Setiawan
- Production companies: Imajinari; Cerita Films
- Release dates: 26 November 2023 (Jogjakarta); 30 November 2023 (Indonesia)
- Running time: 118 minutes
- Country: Indonesia
- Language: Indonesian

Falling In Love Like In Movies (Indonesian: Jatuh Cinta Seperti Di Film-Film) is a 2023 Indonesian romantic comedy film directed and written by Yandy Laurens. Presented by Imajinari and produced by Cerita Films, it stars Ringgo Agus Rahman, Nirina Zubir, Alex Abbad, Sheila Dara Aisha, Dion Wiyoko, and Julie Estelle.

The film premiered at the 18th Jogja-NETPAC Asian Film Festival on 26 November 2023, competing for Indonesian Screen Awards. It received eleven nominations at the 2024 Indonesian Film Festival, winning seven including Best Picture and all four acting categories.

== Synopsis ==
A film writer works on his first original screenplay about his true story of falling in love with his high school best friend who has recently lost her spouse.

== Cast ==
- Ringgo Agus Rahman as Bagus Rahmat, a screenwriter
- Nirina Zubir as Hana, a florist and Bagus' high school best friend who recently lost her spouse
- Alex Abbad as Yoram Andaman, film producer
- Sheila Dara Aisha as Cheline, film editor and Dion's wife
- Dion Wiyoko as himself / Bagus, actor and Cheline's husband
- Julie Estelle as herself / Hana, actress
- Donne Maula as Denny, Hana's late husband
- Abdurrahman Arif as Assistant Director
- Emily Yorda as Yati

== Production ==
The principal photography took place from February to March 2023. Laurens had developed the script for five years and revealed that it was rejected by several production companies due to its black-and-white visual style. Jagartha and Trinity Entertainment Network financed the film.

=== Casting ===
It is Laurens' second collaboration with both Rahman and Zubir after his debut feature film Cemara's Family (2019). This also marks Estelle's acting return after her last appearance in Foxtrot Six four years prior.

== Release ==
The film had its world premiere at the 18th Jogja-NETPAC Asian Film Festival on 26 November 2023 during the Indonesian Screen Awards section. The film was released in Indonesian cinema four days later on 30 November 2023. It garnered 651,074 admissions during its theatrical run.

Netflix and Vidio acquired the film's distribution rights, releasing it on 29 March 2024 and 4 July 2026, respectively.

== Accolades ==
Award / Film Festival	Date of ceremony	Category	Recipient(s)	Result	Ref.
Film Pilihan Tempo	29 January 2024	Film Pilihan Tempo	Falling in Love Like in Movies	Nominated	
Film Pilihan Tempo	29 January 2024	Best Director	Yandy Laurens	Nominated	
Film Pilihan Tempo	29 January 2024	Best Screenplay	Yandy Laurens	Won	
Film Pilihan Tempo	29 January 2024	Best Actor	Ringgo Agus Rahman	Nominated	
Film Pilihan Tempo	29 January 2024	Best Actress	Nirina Zubir	Nominated	
Film Pilihan Tempo	29 January 2024	Best Supporting Actor	Alex Abbad	Won	
Film Pilihan Tempo	29 January 2024	Best Supporting Actor	Dion Wiyoko	Nominated	
Film Pilihan Tempo	29 January 2024	Best Supporting Actress	Julie Estelle	Nominated	
Film Pilihan Tempo	29 January 2024	Best Supporting Actress	Sheila Dara Aisha	Nominated	
Festival Film Bandung	9 November 2024	Highly Commended Film	Falling in Love Like in Movies	Nominated	
Festival Film Bandung	9 November 2024	Highly Commended Director	Yandy Laurens	Nominated	
Festival Film Bandung	9 November 2024	Highly Commended Leading Actor	Ringgo Agus Rahman	Nominated	
Festival Film Bandung	9 November 2024	Highly Commended Leading Actress	Nirina Zubir	Nominated	
Festival Film Bandung	9 November 2024	Highly Commended Cinematography	Dimas Bagus Triatma Yoga	Nominated	
Indonesian Film Festival	20 November 2024	Best Picture	Ernest Prakasa and Suryana Paramita	Won	
Indonesian Film Festival	20 November 2024	Best Director	Yandy Laurens	Nominated	
Indonesian Film Festival	20 November 2024	Best Actor	Ringgo Agus Rahman	Won	
Indonesian Film Festival	20 November 2024	Best Actress	Nirina Zubir	Won	
Indonesian Film Festival	20 November 2024	Best Supporting Actor	Alex Abbad	Won	
Indonesian Film Festival	20 November 2024	Best Supporting Actress	Sheila Dara Aisha	Won	
Indonesian Film Festival	20 November 2024	Best Original Screenplay	Yandy Laurens	Won	
Indonesian Film Festival	20 November 2024	Best Editing	Hendra Adhi Susanto	Nominated	
Indonesian Film Festival	20 November 2024	Best Sound	Syaifullah Praditya and Arif Budi Santoso	Nominated	
Indonesian Film Festival	20 November 2024	Best Original Score	Ofel Obaja Setiawan	Nominated	
Indonesian Film Festival	20 November 2024	Best Theme Song	Donne Maulana for "Bercinta Lewat Kata"	Won	
Anugerah Musik Indonesia	4 December 2024	Best Production Work for Visual Media	Donne Maulana for "Bercinta Lewat Kata"	Nominated	
