= Suryana Paramita =

Indonesian film producer

Suryana Paramita is an Indonesian film producer and writer. She is best known for producing the films directed by Yandy Laurens. She co-founded the production company Cerita Films in 2018 with Laurens. She received the Citra Award for Best Picture for Falling in Love Like in Movies (2023).

== Career ==
In 2018, Paramita co-founded the production company Cerita Films with director Yandy Laurens, whom she met while studying at the Institut Kesenian Jakarta. She also served as Vice Dean of the Film and Television Department at the institute.

Her novel Sore: Istri Dari Masa Depan, based on the web series, was published on 22 November 2019 by Kawah Media. She wrote the story for Sidi Saleh's drama film This Is Not a Love Story. In 2022, she co-wrote and produced Disney+ Hotstar romantic fantasy series What We Lose to Love.

In 2023, she produced her first feature film, Falling in Love Like in Movies with Ernest Prakasa. It had its world premiere at the 18th Jogja-NETPAC Asian Film Festival, competing for the Indonesian Screen Awards. It won the Citra Award for Best Picture at the 2024 ceremony. In 2025, she produced the film adaptation of Laurens' web series of the same name, Sore: Wife from the Future. The film was selected as the Indonesian submission for the Best International Feature Film at the 98th Academy Awards. She served as a member of the Hanoman Award jury at the 20th Jogja-NETPAC Asian Film Festival.

== Filmography ==
=== Film ===
Year	Title	Producer	Writer	Notes
2019	This Is Not a Love Story	No	Story by	
2023	Falling in Love Like in Movies	Yes	No	
2024	A Brother and 7 Siblings	Yes	No	
2025	Sore: Wife from the Future	Yes	No	

=== Television ===
Year	Title	Producer	Writer	Network	Notes
2022	Perjalanan Terbaik Sepanjang Masa	Yes	No	YouTube	4 episodes
2022	What We Lose to Love	Yes	Yes	Disney+ Hotstar	12 episodes

== Bibliography ==
- Paramita, Suryana (2019). Sore: Istri Dari Masa Depan. Kawah Media. ISBN 9789797945961.
