= The Mask Singer Indonesia =

Indonesian singing competition television show

- Genre: Reality competition
- Based on: King of Mask Singer by Munhwa Broadcasting Corporation
- Presented by: John Martin Tumbel
- Country of origin: Indonesia
- Original language: Indonesian
- No. of seasons: 4
- No. of episodes: 29

Production
- Running time: 150 minutes

Original release
- Network: GTV
- Release: 18 October 2017 – 12 April 2019

The Mask Singer Indonesia is an Indonesian reality singing competition television series based on the Masked Singer franchise which originated from the South Korean version of the show King of Mask Singer. It premiered on GTV on 18 October 2017, and is hosted by John Martin Tumbel.

== Season 1 ==
Season 1 came out on 18 October 2017. It ended on 10 January 2018.

Stage Name	Identity	Occupation	Episodes																	
Stage Name	Identity	Occupation	1	2	3	4	5	6	7	8	9		10		11		12		13	
Stage Name	Identity	Occupation	1	2	3	4	5	6	7	8	A	B	A	B	A	B	A	B	A	B
Bee ("Ulet Hip-Hop")	Tiwi "T2"	Singer					WIN								WIN	SAFE			WIN	WINNER
Warrior ("Pastel Warrior")	Bobby Tince	Actor						WIN									WIN	SAFE	WIN	RUNNER-UP
Leaf Princess ("Putri Daun")	Ussy Sulistiawaty	Actress								WIN	WIN	SAFE							OUT	
Ondel-Ondel	Bobby Maulana	Actor	WIN										WIN	SAFE					OUT	
Queen Cobra	Oline Mendeng	Actress						WIN									WIN	OUT		
Lady Rain	Jennifer Arnelita	Actress				WIN											OUT			
Gas Tank ("Agen Gas Rahasia")	Dwi Andhika	Actor				WIN											OUT			
Executor ("Eksekutor")	Zian "Zigaz"	Musician					WIN								WIN	OUT				
Lady Deer	Dara "The Virgin"	Actress			WIN										OUT					
Playing Card	Lee Jeong Hoon	Singer								WIN					OUT					
Black Crow Witch ("Penyihir Gagak Hitam")	Selfi Nafilah	Singer		WIN									WIN	OUT						
Shark ("I Love Hiu")	Rafael Tan	Singer		WIN									OUT							
Grasshopper Butterfly ("Belalang Kupu-kupu")	Joshua Suherman	Actor			WIN								OUT							
Jellyfish Ballerina ("Ubur-ubur Balerina")	Boiyen	Singer	WIN								WIN	OUT								
Happy Mechanic ("Mekanik Happy")	Torro Margens	Actor							WIN		OUT									
Happy Watermelon ("Semangka Ceria")	Tina Toon	Singer							WIN		OUT									
Ferris Wheel ("Bianglala")	Helsi Herlinda	Television actress								OUT										
Frog Prince ("Pangeran Kodok")	Yadi Sembako	Actor								OUT										
Sunny Side Up ("Telur Mata Sapi")	Evelyn Nada Anjani	Aming Sugandhi's ex-wife							OUT											
Knight Dragon ("Ksatria Naga")	Temon	Actor							OUT											
Samurai Cat ("Kucing Samurai")	Ki Kusumo	Actor						OUT												
Racing Horse ("Kuda Balap")	Asri Welas	Actress						OUT												
Octopus ("Gurita")	TJ	Actress					OUT													
Monkey ("Rakernas") (Note: "Rakernas" translates to "national working meeting", but the costume is of a monkey)	Kiwil	Actor					OUT													
Sun ("Sunny")	Dhea Ananda	Actor and singer				OUT														
Chicken Soup ("Pendekar Mangkuk Ayam")	Reza Aditya	Actor				OUT														
Chef's Pot ("Koki Panci")	Aldi Taher	Actor			OUT															
Doctor Fly ("Dokter Lalat")	Amel Carla	Actress			OUT															
Sunflower ("Bunga Matahari")	Cherly Juno	Model		OUT																
Scarecrow ("Orang-orangan Sawah")	Rangga Moela	Singer		OUT																
Punk Bird	Mpok Atiek	Film actor	OUT																	
Gatot Rider ("Gatot Kaca")	Budi Doremi	Singer	OUT																	

=== Episode 1 (18 Oct) ===
Performances on the first episode
#	Stage name	Song	Identity	Result
1	Ondel-Ondel	"Cinta Gila" by Dewa 19	undisclosed	WIN
2	Gatot Rider	"Don't Look Back in Anger" by Oasis	Budi Doremi	OUT
3	Jellyfish Ballerina	"Cinda Terbaik" by Cassandra	undisclosed	WIN
4	Punk Bird	"Pergi Pagi Pulang Pagi" by Armada	Mpok Atiek	OUT

=== Episode 2 (24 Oct) ===
Performances on the second episode
#	Stage name	Song	Identity	Result
1	Scarecrow	"Because of You" by Keith Martin	Rangga Moela	OUT
2	Shark	"All of Me" by John Legend	undisclosed	WIN
3	Black Crow Witch	"Wonder Woman" by Mulan Jameela	undisclosed	WIN
4	Sunflower	"Stand Up for Love" by Destiny's Child	Cherly Juno	OUT

=== Episode 3 (1 Nov) ===
Performances on the third episode
#	Stage name	Song	Identity	Result
1	Doctor Fly	"Price Tag" by Jessie J ft. B.o.B.	Amel Carla	OUT
2	Lady Deer	"Bintang Kehidupan" by Nike Ardilla	undisclosed	WIN
3	Grasshopper Butterfly	"Payphone" by Maroon 5 ft. Wiz Khalifa	undisclosed	WIN
4	Chef's Pot	"Demi Waktu" by Ungu	Aldi Taher	OUT

=== Episode 4 (8 Nov) ===
Performances on the fourth episode
#	Stage name	Song	Identity	Result
1	Gas Tank	"Butiran Debu" by Rumor	undisclosed	WIN
2	Chicken Soup	"Kita" by Sheila on 7	Reza Aditya	OUT
3	Sun	"Titanium" by David Guetta ft. Sia	Dhea Ananda	OUT
4	Lady Rain	"Ku Tak Sanggup" by Krisdayanti	undisclosed	WIN

=== Episode 5 (15 Nov) ===
Performances on the fifth episode
#	Stage name	Song	Identity	Result
1	Monkey	"Kehilangan" by Firman Siagian	Kiwil	OUT
2	Executor	"Dia" by Anji	undisclosed	WIN
3	Octopus	"Satu yang Tak Bisa Lepas" by Reza Artamevia	TJ	OUT
4	Bee	"Love Yourself" by Justin Bieber	undisclosed	WIN

=== Episode 6 (22 Nov) ===
Performances on the sixth episode
#	Stage name	Song	Identity	Result
1	Racing Horse	"Pilihlah Aku" by Krisdayanti	Asri Welas	OUT
2	Queen Cobra	"Mencintaimu" by Krisdayanti	undisclosed	WIN
3	Samurai Cat	"Selimut Tetangga" by Repvblik	Ki Kusumo	OUT
4	Warrior	"Cukup Tau" by Rizky Febian	undisclosed	WIN

=== Episode 7 (29 Nov) ===
Performances on the seventh episode
#	Stage name	Song	Identity	Result
1	Knight Dragon	"What’s Up?" by 4 Non Blondes	Temon	OUT
2	Happy Watermelon	"Aku Makin Cinta" by Vina Panduwinata	undisclosed	WIN
3	Happy Mechanic	"Menunggu" by Rhoma Irama	undisclosed	WIN
4	Sunny Side Up	"Lebih Indah" by Adera	Evelyn Nada Anjani	OUT

=== Episode 8 (6 Dec) ===
Performances on the eighth episode
#	Stage name	Song	Identity	Result
1	Frog Prince	"Rasa Yang Tertinggal" by ST 12	Yadi Sembako	OUT
2	Playing Card	"Sekali Ini Saja" by Glenn Fredly	undisclosed	WIN
3	Leaf Princess	"Ratu Sejagad" by Vonny Sumlang	undisclosed	WIN
4	Ferris Wheel	"Cintaku" by Chrisye	Helsi Herlinda	OUT

=== Episode 9 (13 Dec) ===
Performances on the ninth episode
#	Stage name	Song	Identity	Result
1	Jellyfish Ballerina	"Tua Tua Keladi” by Anggun	undisclosed	WIN
2	Happy Watermelon	"We Found Love" by Rihanna ft. Calvin Harris	Tina Toon	OUT
3	Happy Mechanic	"Jandaku" by Imam S. Arifin	Torro Margens	OUT
4	Leaf Princess	"Aku Cinta Kau dan Dia" by Dewa 19	undisclosed	WIN

#	Stage name	Song	Identity	Result
1	Jellyfish Ballerina	"Aku Yang Tersakiti" by Judika	Boiyen	OUT
2	Leaf Princess	"Yang Kumau" by Krisdayanti	undisclosed	WIN

=== Episode 10 (20 Dec) ===
Performances on the tenth episode
#	Stage name	Song	Identity	Result
1	Ondel-Ondel	"Topeng" by Peterpan	undisclosed	WIN
2	Grasshopper Butterfly	"Toothbrush" by DNCE	Joshua Suherman	OUT
3	Black Crow Witch	"Can't Take My Eyes Off You" by Muse	undisclosed	WIN
4	Shark	"Starlight" by Muse	Rafael Tan	OUT

#	Stage name	Song	Identity	Result
1	Ondel-Ondel	"Manja" by ADA Band	undisclosed	WIN
2	Black Crow Witch	"Fly Me to the Moon" by Frank Sinatra	Selfi Nafilah	OUT

=== Episode 11 (27 Dec) ===
Performances on the eleventh episode
#	Stage name	Song	Identity	Result
1	Executor	"Sugar" by Maroon 5	undisclosed	WIN
2	Playing Card	"Surat Cinta untuk Starla" by Virgoun	Lee Jeong Hoon	OUT
3	Lady Deer	"Till It Hurts" by Yellow Claw ft. Ayden	Dara "The Virgin"	OUT
4	Bee	"Shape of You" by Ed Sheeran	undisclosed	WIN

#	Stage name	Song	Identity	Result
1	Executor	"Asal Kau Bahagia" by Armada	Zian "Zigaz"	OUT
2	Bee	"Akad" by Payung Teduh	undisclosed	WIN

=== Episode 12 (3 Jan) ===
Performances on the twelfth episode
#	Stage name	Song	Identity	Result
1	Gas Tank	"Yang Penting Happy" by Pasto-1	Dwi Andhika	OUT
2	Warrior	"Dari Mata" by Jaz	undisclosed	WIN
3	Lady Rain	"Jadikan Aku yang Kedua" by Astrid	Jennifer Arnelita	OUT
4	Queen Cobra	"Seperti Itu" by Syahrini	undisclosed	WIN

#	Stage name	Song	Identity	Result
1	Warrior	"Lagu Rinda" by Kerispatih	undisclosed	WIN
2	Queen Cobra	"Kaulah Segalanya" by Ruth Sahanaya	Oline Mendeng	OUT

=== Episode 13 (10 Jan) ===
- Group performance: "Kangen" by Dewa 19

Performances on the final episode
#	Stage name	Song	Identity	Result
1	Ondel-Ondel	"Elang" by Dewa 19	Bobby Maulana	OUT
2	Warrior	"Kali Kedua" by Raisa	undisclosed	WIN
3	Bee	"Havana" by Camila Cabello ft. Young Thug	undisclosed	WIN
4	Leaf Princess	"Terlalu Cinta" by Rossa	Ussy Sulistiawaty	OUT

#	Stage name	Song	Identity	Result
1	Warrior	"Cheap Thrills" by Sia feat. Sean Paul	Bobby Tince	RUNNER-UP
2	Bee	"Kasmaran" by Jaz	Tiwi “T2”	WINNER
