= Bridezilla (film) =

- Theatrical release poster
- Directed by: Andibachtiar Yusuf
- Written by: Lucky Kuswandi; Fai Tirtha
- Produced by: Christian Imanuell
- Starring: Jessica Mila; Rio Dewanto; Sheila Dara Aisha; Rafael Tan
- Cinematography: Bagoes Tresna Adji
- Edited by: Aji Pradityo
- Music by: Ofel Setiawan
- Production companies: Visinema Pictures; Tony Mulani Films; iflix
- Release date: August 1, 2019
- Running time: 94 minutes
- Country: Indonesia
- Language: Indonesian

Bridezilla is a 2019 Indonesian comedy-drama film directed by Andibachtiar Yusuf, from a screenplay by Lucky Kuswandi and Fai Tirtha. It stars Jessica Mila, Rio Dewanto, Sheila Dara Aisha, and Rafael Tan. The film was released on August 1, 2019.

== Synopsis ==
Dara had a childhood dream to have an ideal wedding party. Her dream came true when she became a "wedding organizer". However, a small mistake at the wedding of a lesser-known celebrity made Dara's organizer fall and threatened to go bankrupt. The conflict gets bigger when Dara and Alvin's long-dreamed marriage gets closer.

== Cast ==
- Jessica Mila as Dara
- Rio Dewanto as Alvin
- Sheila Dara Aisha as Key
- Rafael Tan as A'ang
- Widyawati as Anna Soedarjo
- Aimee Saras as Kirana
- Rukman Rosadi as Dara's father
- Lucinta Luna as Queen Lucinta
- Adriano Qalbi as Lord Bobby
- Melissa Karim as Yoga Teacher
