= Madame X (2010 film) =

2010 film by Lucky Kuswandi

- Film poster
- Directed by: Lucky Kuswandi
- Written by: Agasyah Karim; Khalid Khasogi; Lucky Kuswandi
- Produced by: Nia Dinata
- Starring: Aming; Marcell Siahaan; Shanty; Titi DJ; Sarah Sechan; Fitri Tropica; Vincent Rompies
- Cinematography: Roni Arnold
- Edited by: Robin Moran
- Music by: Aghi Narottama; Bemby Gusti; Ramondo Gascaro
- Production company: Kalyana Shira Films
- Release date: 7 October 2010 (Indonesia)
- Running time: 101 minutes
- Country: Indonesia
- Language: Indonesian

Madame X is a 2010 Indonesian superhero comedy film directed by Lucky Kuswandi in his directorial debut from a screenplay he co-wrote with Agasyah Karim and Khalid Khasogi. It stars Aming as a hairdresser who transforms into the title character, a transgender superhero fighting off Kanjeng Badai and his homophobic political party.

The film was released in Indonesian theatres on 7 October 2010. It received two nominations at the 5th Asian Film Awards.

== Premise ==
A hairdresser transforms into the superhero Madame X to fight off the threat of Kanjeng Badai and his militant, homophobic political party in order to prevent him from winning the election.

== Cast ==
- Aming as Adam / Madame X
- Marcell Siahaan as Kanjeng Badai
- Shanty as Kinky Amalia
- Sarah Sechan as Lilis
- Fitri Tropica as Cun Cun
- Titi DJ as Bunda Ratu
- Joko Anwar as Aline
- Ria Irawan as Yantje

== Production ==
Producer Nia Dinata revealed that the film was inspired by a conversation she had with Aming about creating an "unconventional" superhero, one who is neither "muscular nor sexy". It marks comedian Fitri Tropica's debut film and singer Marcell Siahaan's first acting role in eight years.

== Release ==
Madame X was released in Indonesian theatres on 7 October 2010. It had its international premiere at the 35th Hong Kong International Film Festival in March 2021. It also screened at the 35th Frameline Film Festival in June 2011. In July 2011, it had its Korean premiere at the Puchon International Fantastic Film Festival at the World Fantastic Cinema section. In October 2011, it competed at the MIX Copenhagen.

In September 2021, the film screened at the Queer East Film Festival in London to celebrate the film's tenth anniversary. In November 2025, it will screen at the Rewind section at the 20th Jogja-NETPAC Asian Film Festival in Yogyakarta.

== Reception ==
Writing for Variety, Boyd Van Hoeij described the film as "fabulous". He also commended Kuswandi's directing on "finding exactly the right tone for the material, packaging the irreverent, often riotous antics and a clear pro-diversity message".

=== Accolades ===
Award / Film Festival	Date of ceremony	Category	Recipient(s)	Result	Ref.
Asian Film Awards	21 March 2011	Best Supporting Actress	Shanty	Nominated	
Asian Film Awards	21 March 2011	Best Production Designer	Eros Eflin	Nominated	
MIX Copenhagen	30 October 2011	Best Feature Film	Lucky Kuswandi	Won	
