= What We Lose to Love =

2022 Indonesian romantic fantasy television miniseries

- Release poster
- Indonesian: Yang Hilang Dalam Cinta
- Genre: Romantic fantasy; Drama
- Created by: Yandy Laurens
- Written by: Yandy Laurens; Suryana Paramita
- Directed by: Yandy Laurens
- Starring: Dion Wiyoko; Sheila Dara Aisha; Reza Rahadian
- Composer: Ofel Obaja
- Country of origin: Indonesia
- Original language: Indonesian
- No. of episodes: 12

Production
- Executive producers: Fiaz Servia; Amrit Dido Servia; Riza; Mithu Nisar; Raza Servia
- Producers: Chand Parwez Servia; Reza Servia; Suryana Paramita
- Cinematography: Dimas Bagus
- Editor: Hendra Adhi Susanto
- Running time: 28–34 minutes
- Production companies: Starvision; Cerita Films

Original release
- Network: Disney+ Hotstar
- Release: 30 July – 3 September 2022

What We Lose to Love (Indonesian: Yang Hilang dalam Cinta) is an Indonesian romantic fantasy television miniseries created, directed, and written by Yandy Laurens for Disney+ Hotstar. The series premiered on 30 July 2022 and concluded on 3 September 2022, consisting of twelve episodes. It stars Dion Wiyoko, Sheila Dara Aisha, and Reza Rahadian in the leading roles.

== Premise ==
Satria reunites with his first love, Dara, who is preparing to marry her new lover, Rendra. However, Dara suddenly "disappears" and becomes unable to touch anything around her. She also becomes invisible to everyone except Satria.

== Cast ==
=== Main ===
- Dion Wiyoko as Satria Satya Wiguna
  - Zidane Khalid as young Satria
- Sheila Dara Aisha as Dara Santini
  - Maisha Kanna as young Dara
- Reza Rahadian as Rendra Pratama

=== Supporting ===
- Dwi Sasono as Bima
- Asri Welas as Rahayu
- Maya Hasan as Lena
- Daniel Mananta as Willy
- Kiki Narendra as Seno
- Donne Maulana as Danny
- Gregory Prabowo as Arif
- Almanzo Konoralma as Bob
- Arawinda Kirana as Sarah
- Ringgo Agus Rahman as Bagas Adi Putra
- Fazrie Permana as Farhan Permana
- Alfath Kiting as Teo

== Episodes ==
No.	Title	Directed by	Written by	Original release date
1	"The One Who Disappears"	Yandy Laurens	Yandy Laurens & Suryana Paramita	30 July 2022
2	"The One Who Knows the Truth"	Yandy Laurens	Yandy Laurens & Suryana Paramita	30 July 2022
3	"The One Who Waits for the Right Time"	Yandy Laurens	Yandy Laurens & Suryana Paramita	6 August 2022
4	"The One Who Leaves"	Yandy Laurens	Yandy Laurens & Suryana Paramita	6 August 2022
5	"Things That Grow Again"	Yandy Laurens	Yandy Laurens & Suryana Paramita	13 August 2022
6	"Things That Are Revealed"	Yandy Laurens	Yandy Laurens & Suryana Paramita	13 August 2022
7	"The One Who Chooses"	Yandy Laurens	Yandy Laurens & Suryana Paramita	20 August 2022
8	"Things of the Past"	Yandy Laurens	Yandy Laurens & Suryana Paramita	20 August 2022
9	"The One Who Persists"	Yandy Laurens	Yandy Laurens & Suryana Paramita	27 August 2022
10	"The One Who Remembers"	Yandy Laurens	Yandy Laurens & Suryana Paramita	27 August 2022
11	"The One Who Lets Everything Go"	Yandy Laurens	Yandy Laurens & Suryana Paramita	3 September 2022
12	"The Wholeness Within"	Yandy Laurens	Yandy Laurens & Suryana Paramita	3 September 2022

== Production ==
The idea of What We Lose to Love was conceived by creator Yandy Laurens after hearing the story of a friend going through a toxic relationship. Principal photography took place for 53 days in Jakarta and began in September 2021, making it Laurens' longest production.

On 8 July 2022, Starvision and Cerita Films announced that the miniseries would be released on Disney+ Hotstar and premiered on 30 July 2022.

== Release ==
What We Lose to Love premiered on 30 July 2022 on Disney+ Hotstar, with two episodes released weekly.

== Accolades ==
The series won Series of the Year at the 2022 Jakarta Film Week.
