= Gisella Anastasia =

Indonesian actress

- Born: Gisella Anastasia Suryanto; 16 November 1990 (age 35); Surabaya, East Java, Indonesia
- Other name: Gisel
- Occupations: Celebrity; Model; Presenter; Singer
- Years active: 2008–present
- Spouse: Gading Marten (m. 2013; div. 2019)

Gisella Anastasia (born 16 November 1990), known mononymously as Gisel, is an Indonesian singer, model, presenter and actress. She was the runner-up of the fifth season of Indonesian Idol which was broadcast by RCTI in 2008.

== Early life ==
- Petra 1 Christian Senior High School Surabaya (2004)
- University of Bunda Mulia (2006)

== Career ==
=== Indonesian Idol ===
Episode	Date	Original Songs & Singer	Result
Audition Round		Ratu Sejagad – Ratu	Won
Workshop round 24 big		Wonder Woman – Mulan Jameela	Won
Workshop round 16 big		Aku Bukan Boneka – Rinni Wulandari	Won
Pregala & Wildcard Round		Dua Hati Menjadi Satu – Gita Gutawa & Dafi Sabri	Won
Big Specta Round 12	May 16, 2008	Cinta Jangan Kau Pergi – Sheila Majid	Won
Big Specta Round 11	May 23, 2008	Teman Tapi Mesra – Ratu	Won
Big Specta Round 10	May 30, 2008	Menanti Sebuah Jawaban – Padi	Won
Big Specta Round 9	June 6, 2008	Cinta Pertama (Sunny) – Bunga Citra Lestari	(Bottom 3) Passed
Big Specta Round 8	June 13, 2008	Selamanya Cinta – D'Cinnamons	(Bottom 3) Passed
Big Specta Round 7	June 20, 2008	Terlalu Cinta – Rossa	Won
Big Specta Round 6	June 27, 2008	Masa Kecilku – Elfas Singer	Won
Big Specta Round 5	July 4, 2008	Arti Hadirmu – Audy Item	Won
Big Specta Round 4	July 11, 2008	Wanita Yang Kau Pilih – Rossa	(Bottom 3) Passed
Big Specta Round 4	July 11, 2008	Ayah – Rinto Harahap	(Bottom 3) Passed
Big Specta Round 3	July 18, 2008	Sahabat Setia – Andien	Won
Big Specta Round 3	July 18, 2008	Hanya Cinta Yang Bisa – Titi DJ	Won
Grand Final	August 4, 2008	Indah Hari Ini – Shanty	Runner up
Grand Final	August 4, 2008	That's The Way It Is – Celine Dion	Runner up
Grand Final	August 4, 2008	Cinta Jangan Kau Pergi – Sheila Majid	Runner up
Grand Final	August 4, 2008	Harap Kan Sempurna – (Winner Song)	Runner up

== Discography ==
=== Singles ===
- Seluruh Nafas Ini feat. Last Child (band) (2011)
- Pencuri Hati (2012)
- Cara Melupakanmu (2016)
- Hidup Untukmu feat. Rayen Pono (2017)
- Indah Pada Waktunya (2018)
- Sendirian feat. Abirama (2018)
- Yang Kumau (2019) (Ost. Rumput Tetangga)
- Katakanlah feat. Coboy (2019)
- Masih Bisa Panjang feat. Young Lex (2020)

== Filmography ==
Years	Title	Role	Production
2016	Cek Toko Sebelah	Natalie	Starvision Plus
2017	Susah Sinyal	Cassandra	Starvision Plus
2018	Flight 555	Intan	Citra Visual Sinema
2018	The Secret: Suster Ngesot Urban Legend	Nicole	RA Pictures
2019	Laundry Show	Agustina	Tripar Multivision Plus
2025	Siapa Dia	Mul	Fabis Entertainment; 909 Studio
2025	A Normal Woman	Erica	Soda Machine Films

=== Television ===
- Opera Van Java (2021)

=== Television film ===
- Cinta Bersemi demi Harta Warisan
- Jadikan Aku Pacarmu
- Cinta Tak Selancar Berselancar
- Malu-Malu Mau
- My Gebetan Wedding
- My Gebetan Wedding 2
- Mantanku Mirip Gisel
- Keren Keren Mellow
- Cicilan Cinta Tukang Kredit (2018) sebagai Cinta

== Awards and nominations ==
Year	Appreation	Category	Result
2017	Indonesian Box Office Movie Awards 2017	Best Female Lead (film) Cek Toko Sebelah	Nominated
2017	Indonesian Box Office Movie Awards 2017	Best Newcomer (film) Cek Toko Sebelah	Won

== Personal life ==
On 14 September 2013, Gisella married Gading Marten, son of actor Roy Marten, with a blessing ceremony held in Uluwatu, Bali. They divorced in January 2019.

On 6 November 2020, a 19-second circulated online featuring a woman who looked like Gisella Anastasia having sex with a man; it became a 'trending topic on Twitter Indonesia until 7 November 2020.

On 29 December 2020, she finally admitted that she was the one in the inappropriate video.

Initially, many netizens thought that the man seen in the video was Adhietya Mukti, the keyboardist of a band called The Rhythm Band, which accompanies Indonesian singers such as Ayu Ting Ting, Zaskia Gotik, and even the actress who is suspected of playing the female role in the is Gisella Anastasia.

Adhietya himself has denied the accusation by saying that it is an unfounded slander, even Adhietya even went as far as to clarify the opinion of netizens about the physical appearance of the male actor in the mole on his right cheek, he also compares the male lead in 's body posture with his, where the actor's posture tends to be more of a skinny body with a slimmer face.
