= The Most Beautiful Girl in the World (2025 film) =

2025 film by Robert Ronny

- Promotional release poster
- Directed by: Robert Ronny
- Screenplay by: Robert Ronny; Titien Wattimena; Ifan Ismail
- Produced by: Robert Ronny; Pandu Birantoro
- Starring: Reza Rahadian; Sheila Dara Aisha
- Cinematography: Hani Pradigya
- Edited by: Ryan Purwoko
- Music by: Abel Huray
- Production company: Paragon Pictures
- Distributed by: Netflix
- Release date: February 14, 2025
- Running time: 123 minutes
- Country: Indonesia
- Language: Indonesian

The Most Beautiful Girl in the World is a 2025 Indonesian romantic comedy film written and directed by Robert Ronny. Produced under Paragon Pictures, it stars Reza Rahadian and Sheila Dara Aisha. The film was premiered on February 14, 2025, on Netflix.

== Plot ==
Reuben (Reza Rahadian) is the "prince" of the WIN TV media conglomerate who is known to be a playboy and cynical. His father, Gunadi (Bucek) initiated "The Most Beautiful Woman in the World" show, where quality single men find a mate. Something surprising requires Reuben to find a wife through "The Most Beautiful Woman in the World" show, which he actually doesn't like. Kiara (Sheila Dara Aisha) is appointed to change the show with a new perspective. On the other hand, Reuben and Kiara can't stand working with each other and often argue. Helen (Jihane Almira) wins the show and is ready to marry Reuben. However, a disaster that befell Reuben and Kiara changed their lives and choices.

== Cast ==
- Reza Rahadian as Reuben Wiraatmadja
- Sheila Dara Aisha
- Jihane Almira Chedid
- Kevin Julio
- Dea Panendra

== Production ==
=== Development ===
The film is written by Titien Wattimena and Ifan Ismail, who wrote The Red Point of Marriage (2022), and Borderless Fog (2024), and directed by Robert Ronny, who helmed Critical Eleven (2017), teamed up while Paragon Pictures managed the production.

=== Casting ===
In 2024, Reza Rahadian and Sheila Dara Aisha were reportedly cast to appear marking their second collaboration after What We Lose to Love (2022).

=== Filming ===
Netflix confirmed that the film has entered post-production phase.

== Release ==
The film was made available to stream exclusively on Netflix on February 14, 2025.

== Reception ==
Jennifer Green of Common Sense Media rated the film 3 out of 5 stars. Elizabeth Chiquita Tuedestin Priwiratu of IDN Times praised the acting. Tempo critic criticized the execution of playboy style in the film.
