= Check the Store Next Door =

- Theatrical release poster
- Indonesian: Cek Toko Sebelah
- Directed by: Ernest Prakasa
- Written by: Ernest Prakasa; Jenny Jusuf; Meira Anastasia
- Produced by: Chand Parwez Servia; Fiaz Servia
- Starring: Ernest Prakasa; Dion Wiyoko; Chew Kin Wah; Gisella Anastasia; Adinia Wirasti; Tora Sudiro
- Cinematography: Dicky R. Maland
- Edited by: Cesa David Luckmansyah
- Music by: Andhika Triyadi
- Production company: Starvision Plus
- Distributed by: Starvision Plus
- Release date: December 28, 2016
- Running time: 98 minutes
- Country: Indonesia
- Language: Indonesian

Check the Store Next Door (Indonesian: Cek Toko Sebelah), also known as Check Out the Shop Next Door, or Checking on the store next door, is an Indonesian comedy-drama film produced by Starvision Plus, released on December 28, 2016 and directed by Ernest Prakasa. The film was written by Prakasa and Jenny Jusuf with story development from Meira Anastasia.

== Plot ==
Erwin is an overseas university graduate content on his path to climbing the corporate ladder. He receives an offer to get promoted to work in the Singapore office, although his father suddenly falls ill and requests him to take over their little family shop. Erwin is forced to spend a month working at the little shop, pressured by his father and to the disappointment of his girlfriend Natalie, who wants her boyfriend to get his promotion. Erwin's older brother Yohan laments about his father's favoritism and tries to make his own ends meet as he struggles with his own perceived failures, ending in a tantrum calmed by his wife. Yohan has a strained relationship with his father, arising from his misbehaviour during his younger days and his wife, Ayu, who his father disagreed on.

Erwin learns to take care of the shop, bonding over the shop's employees and regular customers. He finds ways to improve the shop's current system, and assists them in winning a decorating competition to the happiness of his father. Throughout his stay the local property developer visits the shop in an attempt to buy off the land. Erwin's father refuses, having sentimental value with his passed wife over the store.

Meanwhile, Yohan tries to start himself out as a photographer with dreams of owning a studio. His wife Ayu, working in a cafe with dreams to open her own bakery, gets offered a piece of land for her shop by her ex-boyfriend. During one of their regular funeral visits, Ayu confesses this to Yohan and has admitted to considering it, although is happy that Yohan understands her and does not get angry at her (contrary to his anger management issues earlier on). Ayu agrees to stay in Jakarta, and work together with Yohan to get ends meet.

Flashing forward to a month after, Erwin gets pressured by Natalie as he receives the promotion offer to work in Singapore. He rejects his father's wish, and celebrates with his coworkers. Dejected, Erwin's father is forced to sell of the land, and close down his shop. He disbands the employees and reminisces over his wife, before stroke hits and he collapses.

Hearing of this, both Erwin and Yohan argue it out in the hospital. They both agree to get back their shop and make amends. Unfortunately their father had already signed the papers and the developer refused to disband the contract. However Erwin noticed the developer's womanizing habits and together they requested the help of his secretary, a single mum with no choice but to submit to the developer's harassment. They manage to get some scandalous photos to force the developer's hand in cancelling out the contracts and also accept his secretary's resignation, who later works at Erwin's work place as his boss' secretary.

Later in the hospital, Erwin and Yohan reminisce about their younger days. Yohan explains his sentiments toward the shop as that was also where his fond memories of his mother lay, and they both agreed that Yohan should take Erwin's place in managing the shop. On a walk, Erwin and his father discuss the matters at hand. Erwin apologizes profusely but he explains that he cannot reject this offer of a lifetime. His father understands, having overheard the conversation between the two brothers, and apologizes for having neglected Yohan's wishes.

Natalie gets enraged after hearing the contract's cancellation, which in turn angers Erwin. She seeks counselling from Ayu, who points out that it was for the best that Erwin lived with no regrets unlike his brother, who constantly berates himself for not being able to make their passed mother happy. Natalie understands and apologizes to Erwin, who then explains to her the true nature of their setup.

Ayu and Yohan visits his mother's grave with flowers. Yohan tears and again apologizes profusely for his failures as a son. Unbeknownst to him his father, Erwin and Natalie stood behind them, apologizing profusely for his own failures as a father. His father laments that he himself failed without his dead wife, and also apologizes to Ayu for not accepting her earlier. The family embraces a warm hug as they mended their broken relationships.

Fast forward to a few years later, Erwin and Natalie comes to visit the newly setup photography studio and bakery, with the same employees from the old shop. Erwin's boss comes and visit with her secretary, who is still grateful for all his help. Meanwhile, their retired father spends his days happily fishing and gambling with Yohan's friends.

== Cast ==
- Ernest Prakasa as Erwin
- Dion Wiyoko as Yohan
- Chew Kin Wah as Koh Afuk
- Adinia Wirasti as Ayu
- Gisella Anastasia as Natalie
- Tora Sudiro as Robert
- Asri Welas as Sonya
- Yeyen Lidya as Anita
- Dodit Mulyanto as Kuncoro
- Awwe as Ojak
- Adjis Doa Ibu as Yadi
- Arafah Rianti as Tini
- Anyun Cadel as Rohman
- Abdur Arsyad as Vincent
- Nino Fernandez as Reno
- Budi Dalton as Nandar
- Arief Didu as Dr. Cahyo
- Yudha Keling as Diding
- Liant Lin as Amiauw
- Melissa Karim as Elisa
