= Cemara's Family =

2018 film by Yandy Laurens

Keluarga Cemara
- Theatrical release poster
- Directed by: Yandy Laurens
- Screenplay by: Gina S. Noer; Yandy Laurens
- Based on: Characters by Arswendo Atmowiloto
- Produced by: Anggia Kharisma; Gina S. Noer
- Starring: Ringgo Agus Rahman; Nirina Zubir; Zara JKT48; Widuri Putri Sasono; Ariyo Wahab; Asri Welas; Maudy Koesnaedi; Gading Marten; Yasamin Jasem
- Cinematography: Robie Taswin
- Edited by: Hendra Adhi Susanto
- Music by: Ifa Fachir (Note: Original theme by Arswendo Atmowiloto and Harry Tjahyono)
- Production companies: Visinema Pictures; Ideosource Entertainment; Kaskus
- Release dates: 29 November 2018 (Jogja); 3 January 2019 (Indonesia)
- Running time: 110 minutes
- Country: Indonesia
- Language: Indonesian
- Box office: IDR 59.5 billion

Cemara's Family (Indonesian: Keluarga Cemara) is a 2019 Indonesian family film adapted from the 1996 TV series of the same title by Arswendo Atmowiloto, and the first film installment of the franchise. The film stars Ringgo Agus Rahman, Nirina Zubir, Zara JKT48, and Widuri Putri Sasono as a family who is forced to live in a remote village following the patriarch's bankruptcy.

The film was released on 3 January 2019 to critical acclaim and gained a total of 1.699.433 audiences, becoming the seventh most-watched movie of the year. Two weeks after the film's release, it won six different categories on Piala Maya 2019, and later five on Piala Citra 2019 and Indonesian Movie Actors Awards 2019. A sequel was released in June 2022, followed by a streaming television series.

== Cast ==
- Ringgo Agus Rahman as Abah
- Nirina Zubir as Emak
- Zara JKT48 as Euis
- Widuri Putri Sasono as Cemara
- Ariyo Wahab as Fajar
- Asri Welas as Ceu Salmah
- Joshia Frederico as Andi
- Kafin Sulthan as Deni
- Kawai Labiba M.A. as Ima
- Yasamin Jasem as Rindu
- Abdurrahman Arif as Kang Romly
- Maudy Koesnaedi as Tante Pressier
- Andrew Trigg as Luc
- Citra Ayu as Bianca
- Melati JKT48 as Via
- Eve JKT48 as Fika
- Vanka JKT48 as Diva

== Development ==
The film was announced on 4 January 2018 with Yandi Lauren as the director, starring Ringgo Agus Rahman, Nirina Zubir, Zara JKT48, and Widuri Putri Sasono. It premiered on 29 November 2018, before publicly released on 3 January 2019.

Following the film's success, Visinema Pictures announced the production of a sequel movie, with a television series centering on Zara JKT48's Euis will be released before the film. The sequel, titled Keluarga Cemara 2, was released in June 2022. Meanwhile, a streaming television series is confirmed to be released on Disney+ Hotstar in September 2022.
