= A Normal Woman =

2025 film by Lucky Kuswandi

- Release poster
- Directed by: Lucky Kuswandi
- Written by: Andri Cung; Lucky Kuswandi
- Produced by: Kevin Ryan Himawan
- Starring: Marissa Anita; Dion Wiyoko; Gisella Anastasia; Mima Shafa; Widyawati; Hatta Rahandy
- Cinematography: Batara Goempar
- Edited by: Dinda Amanda
- Music by: Abel Huray
- Production company: Soda Machine Films
- Release date: 24 July 2025 (Netflix)
- Running time: 110 minutes
- Country: Indonesia
- Languages: Indonesian; English

A Normal Woman is a 2025 Indonesian psychological drama film directed by Lucky Kuswandi from a screenplay he co-wrote with Andri Cung. It is the first production of Kuswandi's production company Soda Machine Films. It stars Marissa Anita as a socialite who contracts a mysterious rash.

The film was released on 24 July 2025 on Netflix.

== Premise ==
A socialite tries to discover the cause of the mysterious rash that suddenly appears on her neck.

== Cast ==
- Marissa Anita as Milla / Grace
- Dion Wiyoko as Jonathan Gunawan
- Gisella Anastasia as Erika
- Mima Shafa as Angel
- Widyawati as Liliana Gunawan
- Hatta Rahandy as Hatta
- Fadi Alaydrus as Roy
- Maya Hasan as Novi
- Melissa Karim as Leni
- Kiki Narendra as Nugros
- Aida Nurmala as Nyonya Nugros
- Sari Yok Koeswoyo as Irah
- Alvin Adam as Dr. Garry
- Agnes Naomi as jurnalis
- Gilbert Pattiruhu as pendeta

== Production ==
The film was first announced as part of Netflix's Southeast Asian slate in February 2025. Kuswandi revealed that the idea for the film was conceived based on his interest in how psychological pressure can manifest as physical conditions. In an interview with Harper's Bazaar Indonesia, Anita revealed that she shaped her character, Milla, by reading psychology books and reflecting on her own experiences of going through a midlife crisis.

== Release ==
A Normal Woman was released on 24 July 2025 on Netflix.
