= Dear David (2023 Indonesian film) =

2023 film by Lucky Kuswandi

- Directed by: Lucky Kuswandi
- Written by: Winnie Benjamin; Daud Sumolang
- Produced by: Meiske Taurisia; Muhammad Zaidy
- Starring: Shenina Cinnamon; Emir Mahira; Caitlin North Lewis
- Cinematography: Robert Gary Cauble
- Edited by: Ahmad Yuniardi
- Music by: Ken Jenie; Mar Galo
- Production company: Palari Films
- Distributed by: Netflix
- Release date: 9 February 2023
- Running time: 118 minutes
- Country: Indonesia
- Language: Indonesian

Dear David is a 2023 Indonesian coming-of-age romantic drama film directed by Lucky Kuswandi from a screenplay written by Winnie Benjamin and Daud Sumolang. It stars Shenina Cinnamon, Emir Mahira, and Caitlin North Lewis.

The film was released on 9 February 2023 on Netflix.

== Premise ==
Dear David follows Laras, a smart high school girl whose life is turned upside down when a provocative blog she wrote about her crush David is leaked.

== Cast ==
- Shenina Cinnamon as Laras
- Emir Mahira as David
- Caitlin North Lewis as Dilla
- Maya Hasan as Hana, Laras' mother
- Jenny Zhang as Indah, school headmaster
- Restu Sinaga as Dedi, David's father

== Production ==
The idea of Dear David was conceived by one of the writers, Winnie Benjamin, who also owned a fan fiction blog. Principal photography began in early 2022 and took place in Jakarta, Puncak, and Sukabumi. To prepare for the role, Shenina Cinnamon was instructed by director Lucky Kuswandi to write her own fantasy stories.

== Release ==
Dear David was released on Netflix on 9 February 2023.
