= Asri Welas =

Indonesian actress and comedian (born 1979)

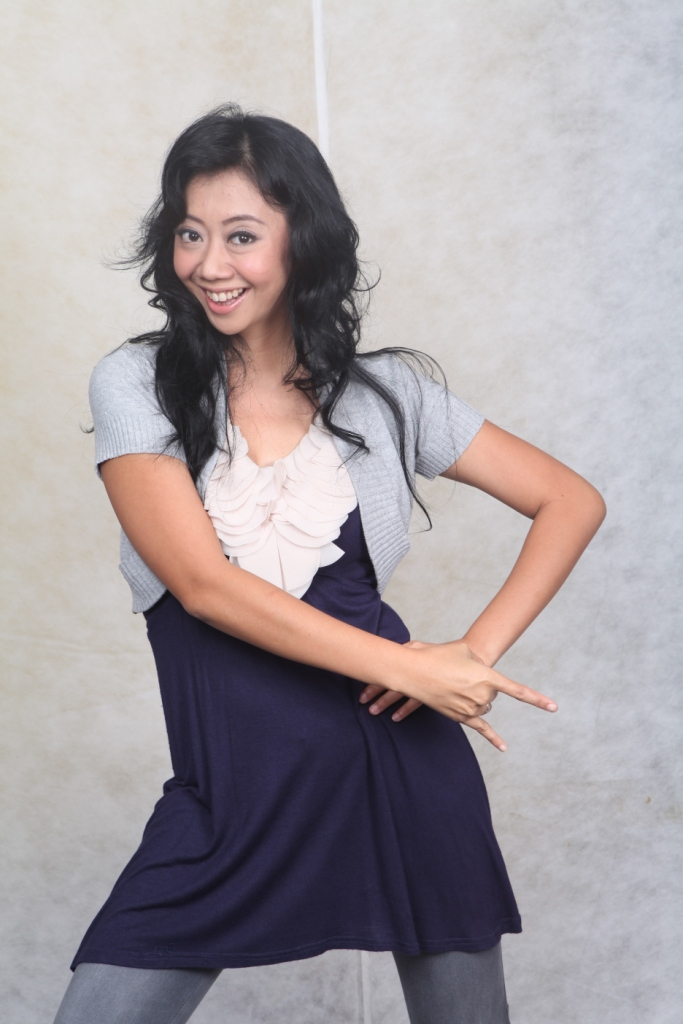
- Born: Asri Pramawati; 7 March 1979 (age 46); Jakarta, Indonesia
- Occupations: Actress; radio personality; fashion designer
- Years active: 2007–present

Asri Pramawati (born 7 March 1979), known professionally as Asri Welas, is an Indonesian actress. She rose to prominence after starring as Welas in the Trans TV sitcom Suami-Suami Takut Istri, later adopting the character's name as her stage name. She has received three Citra Awards nominations for her performances in Cemara's Family (2018), Crazy Awesome Teachers (2020), and Ali & Ratu Ratu Queens (2021).

== Early life ==
Asri Pramawati was born on 7 March 1979 in Jakarta, to a father originally from Palembang and a mother from Yogyakarta. She is a seventh-generation descendant of Javanese prince Diponegoro through her mother. She spent her childhood in Bandar Lampung. She had been interested in dancing since she was two years old. In 1989, she joined Guruh Sukarnoputra's art collective Gencar Semarak Perkasa Production as a dancer.

She graduated with dual degree from the Faculty of Social and Political Sciences and the Faculty of Psychology at the University of Indonesia. She first pursued her studies in the Department of Administrative Sciences in 1997, then continued in Psychology in 2001.

== Career ==
Asri rose to prominence after starring as Welas in the sitcom Suami-Suami Takut Istri, which aired on Trans TV from 2007 to 2010. She later adopted the character's name as her stage name. In 2011, Asri joined Delta FM and co-hosted the morning show with presenters Farhan from 2011 to 2015, Steny Agustaf from 2015 to 2018, and Nino Kayam, the vocalist of the group RAN, from 2018 to 2020. She left in 2020.

In addition to acting, she owns several businesses, including a dance studio and a fashion studio.

== Filmography ==
=== Film ===
Year	Title	Role	Notes
2008	Suami-Suami Takut Istri the Movie	Welas	
2016	Triangle: The Dark Side	Asri	
2016	Check the Store Next Door	Sonya	
2017	The Underdogs	Sonya	
2017	Susah Sinyal	Maya	
2018	Takut Kawin	Bimo's mother	
2018	Ananta	Bik Eha	
2018	R: Raja, Ratu & Rahasia	Anandel	
2018	Impian 1000 Pulau	Mak Zaenab	
2018	Suzzanna: Buried Alive	Mia	
2018	Sesuai Aplikasi	Bu Rini	
2018	Cemara's Family	Ceu Salmah	
2019	The Wedding Shaman	Lawyer	
2019	If I Were You	Madam Sri Menyan	
2019	Ghost Writer	Mrs. Broto	
2019	Bridezilla	Television presenter	
2019	Two Blue Stripes	Pregnant woman	
2019	Kapal Goyang Kapten	Puspa	
2019	99 Names of Love	Villi	
2019	Imperfect	Siska	
2020	Rasuk 2	Uci	
2020	I Know When You Dead	Badriah	
2020	Crazy Awesome Teachers	Indah	
2021	The Heartbreak Club	Wulan	
2021	Ali & Ratu Ratu Queens	Biyah	
2021	Ghibah	Umi Asri	
2021	Nussa	Aunt Mur	Voice
2021	Ranah 3 Warna	Landlady	
2022	First, Second & Third Love	Diana	
2022	Hayya 2: Hope, Dream & Reality	Astri	
2022	DJS the Movie: Biarkan Aku Menari	Fairy	
2022	Cemara's Family 2	Ceu Salmah	
2022	Ghost Writer 2	Mrs. Broto	
2022	Broken Wings	dr. Sari	
2022	Mendarat Darurat	Vera	
2022	Until Tomorrow	Rahma	
2022	Check the Store Next Door 2	Sonya	
2023	Kejar Mimpi Gaspol!	Fifi	
2024	Ipar adalah Maut	Esti	
2024	Lembayung	Ida	
2024	All We Need Is Time	Nana	

=== Television ===
Year	Title	Role	Network	Notes
2007–2010	Suami-Suami Takut Istri	Welas	Trans TV	
2010–2011	Suami Idola	Mpok Lela	Trans7	
2012–2013	Tukang Bubur Naik Haji	Epih	RCTI	
2013–2014	Anak-Anak Manusia	Selbi	RCTI	
2014–2016	7 Manusia Harimau	Mega	RCTI	
2015	Ngantri ke Sorga	Rina	RCTI	
2016	Asisten Rumah Tangga	Welas	RCTI	
2016–2017	Gara-Gara Duyung	Iyem	ANTV	
2017–2018	J-Town	Ayu (voice)	NET.	
2017–2018	Warteg DKI	Encum	ANTV	
2017	The Mask Singer Indonesia	Herself/Racing Horse (contestant)	GTV	
2018	OB OK	Lusi	RCTI	
2018–2020	Cek Toko Sebelah the Series	Sonya	HOOQ / Netflix	
2019	Empat Puluh Hari	Nani	ANTV	
2019	The East	Asri	NET.	
2019	Orang Baru Kaya	Welas/Astrid	RCTI	
2020	Bola Koki	Lastri	MNCTV	
2021	Jodoh Wasiat Bapak	Esty	ANTV	
2021–2023	Turn On	Solena	Vidio	
2021	The Intern	Judith	Vision+	
2021	Susah Sinyal the Series	Maya Welasri	Disney+ Hotstar	
2022	Indonesia's Next Top Model	Herself	NET.	Guest appearance
2022	Menolak Talak	Welas	ANTV	
2022	What We Lose to Love	Rahayu	Disney+ Hotstar	
2022	Keluarga Cemara the Series	Ceu Salmah	Disney+ Hotstar	
2022	12 Hari	Siti Khofifah	Vision+	
2022	Diary Putih Abu-Abu	Arafah	MAXstream	
2023–2024	Tira	Wenny	Disney+ Hotstar	
2023	Comedy Island Indonesia	Herself	Amazon Prime Video	
2025	Ratu Ratu Queens: The Series	Biyah	Netflix	
