= Yandy Laurens =

Indonesian filmmaker (born 1989)

- Born: Alexander Yandy Laurens; 9 April 1989 (age 36); Makassar, South Sulawesi, Indonesia
- Occupations: Director; writer
- Years active: 2008–present

Yandy Laurens (born 9 April 1989) is an Indonesian filmmaker. In 2018, he made his feature directorial debut with Cemara's Family. In 2023, he directed his second feature film, Falling In Love Like In Movies, which won seven Citra Awards including Best Picture.

== Career ==
Born and raised in Makassar, Laurens attended Institut Kesenian Jakarta, majoring in film studies. His graduation film, Wan An, won Best Short Film at the 2012 Indonesian Film Festival. Since then, he has directed several commercials, music videos, and web series.

In 2017, it was announced that Laurens would direct an adaptation of the 1996 television series Keluarga Cemara. In 2018, Cemara's Family had its world premiere at the Jogja-NETPAC Asian Film Festival, starring Ringgo Agus Rahman, Nirina Zubir, Adhisty Zara, and Widuri Puteri. The film was released theatrically on 3 January 2019 and became the year's seventh highest-grossing domestic film in Indonesia with 1,699,433 admissions.

His second feature film, Falling In Love Like In Movies, a partially black-and-white romantic comedy film, had its world premiere at the 18th Jogja-NETPAC Asian Film Festival. This was his second collaboration with Rahman and Zubir, after Cemara's Family. The film was theatrically released in Indonesia on 30 November 2023. It received eleven nominations at the 2024 Indonesian Film Festival, including Best Picture and Best Director.

In 2024, it was announced that Laurens would adapt another television series created by Arswendo Atmowiloto, titled A Brother and 7 Siblings. It was the closing film of the 19th Jogja-NETPAC Asian Film Festival. His fourth feature film Sore: Istri dari Masa Depan was theatrically released in Indonesia on 10 July 2025. It was adapted from his web series of the same name, with Dion Wiyoko reprising his role.

== Filmography ==
Feature film

Year	Title	Director	Writer	Notes
2018	212 Warrior	No	Story developer	
2018	Cemara's Family	Yes	Yes	
2023	Falling In Love Like In Movies	Yes	Yes	
2024	A Brother and 7 Siblings	Yes	Yes	
2025	Sore: Istri dari Masa Depan	Yes	Yes	

Short film

Year	Title	Director	Writer	Notes
2008	Papa Hao	Yes	No	
2009	Badminton	Yes	Yes	
2012	Wan An	Yes	No	
2014	Friend	Yes	Yes	
2014	Menunggu Kabar	Yes	Yes	
2016	Viva Tar!	Yes	No	Documentary
2021	Tenang	Yes	No	
