= Comedy Island Indonesia =

2023 Indonesian TV series or program

- Promotional poster
- Genre: Improv comedy; Reality competition
- Based on: Comedy Island
- Directed by: Patrick Effendy
- Starring: Tora Sudiro; Asri Welas; Cinta Laura
- Country of origin: Indonesia
- Original language: Indonesian
- No. of seasons: 1
- No. of episodes: 6

Production
- Executive producer: Tina Arwin
- Producers: Shanty Harmayn; Tanya Yuson
- Camera setup: Multi-camera
- Running time: 30-50 minutes
- Production company: BASE Entertainment

Original release
- Network: Amazon Prime Video
- Release: November 9, 2023

Comedy Island Indonesia is a improv comedy and reality competition television series directed by Patrick Effendy. Produced by BASE Entertainment, in association with Amazon Studios and features Tora Sudiro, Asri Welas and Cinta Laura. It premiered on Amazon Prime Video on November 9, 2023.

== Cast ==
- Tora Sudiro
- Asri Welas
- Cinta Laura
- Nirina Zubir
- Aming
- Tretan Muslim
- Dustin Tiffani
- Mang Osa
- Uus
- Onadio Leonardo
- Muzakki Ramdhan

== Episodes ==
No. overall	No. in season	Title	Original release date
1	1	"Completely Stranded"	November 9, 2023
2	2	"The Pirates' Comedy Show"	November 9, 2023
3	3	"Escape Gone Wrong"	November 9, 2023
4	4	"Aming's Intervention"	November 9, 2023
5	5	"An Escape Plan"	November 9, 2023
6	6	"Fight & Flight"	November 9, 2023

== Production ==
The series was announced on Amazon Prime Video. The principal photography of the series commenced in 2022 in Thailand.

== See also ==
- List of Amazon Prime Video original programming
