= Lucky Kuswandi =

Indonesian film director (born 1980)

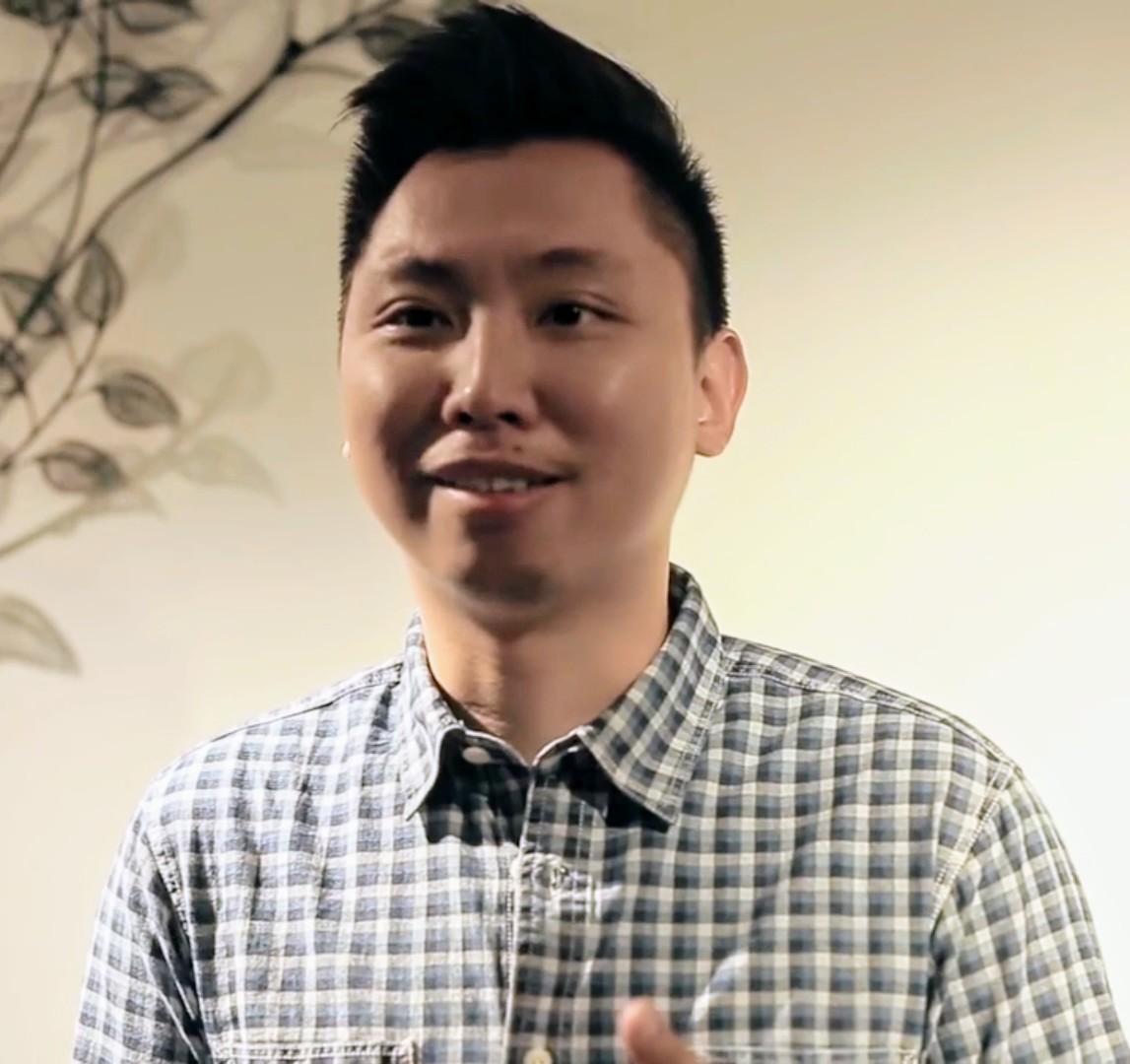
- Kuswandi in 2016
- Born: Lucky Man Kuswandi; 29 August 1980 (age 46); Jakarta, Indonesia
- Education: ArtCenter College of Design
- Occupations: Director; screenwriter
- Years active: 2006–present
- Website: luckykuswandi.com

Lucky Kuswandi (born 29 August 1980) is an Indonesian director and screenwriter.

== Career ==
Kuswandi graduated from ArtCenter College of Design, Pasadena, United States. In 2006, he was selected to join the Berlinale Talent Campus program. In 2009, he directed a short film Miss or Mrs? which was part of anthology film, At Stake and had its world premiere at the 59th Berlin International Film Festival. His feature directorial debut, Madame X, which follows a transgender superhero, was released in 2010. In 2014, his second feature film, In the Absence of the Sun had its world premiere at the 27th Tokyo International Film Festival and served as the closing film of 25th Singapore International Film Festival. It earned Kuswandi his first nominations at the Indonesian Film Festival for Best Director and Best Original Screenplay.

In 2015, he directed a short film The Fox Exploits the Tiger's Might, which had its world premiere during the Critics' Week at the 2015 Cannes Film Festival. It won the Best Short Film at the 2015 Indonesian Film Festival. In 2017, he directed Galih & Ratna, a remake of 1979 film Gita Cinta dari SMA. He was nominated for Citra Award for Best Adapted Screenplay at the 2017 Indonesian Film Festival.

In 2021, he directed a Netflix original film, Ali & Ratu Ratu Queens starring Iqbaal Ramadhan in the titular role. It received sixteen nominations at the 2021 Indonesian Film Festival, including Best Picture. In 2023, he directed his second Netflix original film, Dear David.

In August 2024, Netflix announced that the prequel series of Ali & Ratu Ratu Queens, Ratu Ratu Queens: The Series had been in production, with Kuswandi attached to direct. It was released on 12 September 2025.

He is also a lecturer at the Multimedia Nusantara University since 2009.

== Filmography ==
=== Feature film ===
Year	Film	Director	Producer	Writer	Notes
2008	9808 Antologi 10 Tahun Reformasi Indonesia	Yes	Yes	Yes	Segment: "A Letter of Unprotected Memories"
2009	At Stake	Yes	No	Yes	Segment: "Miss or Mrs?"
2010	Madame X	Yes	No	Yes	
2014	In the Absence of the Sun	Yes	Executive	Yes	
2015	Fragment	Yes	Yes	No	Segment: "Serpong"
2016	Three Sassy Sisters	No	No	Yes	
2017	Galih & Ratna	Yes	No	Yes	
2019	Bridezilla	No	No	Yes	
2021	Ali & Ratu Ratu Queens	Yes	No	No	
2021	A World Without	No	No	Yes	
2023	Dear David	Yes	No	No	
2025	A Normal Woman	Yes	No	Yes	

=== Short film ===
Year	Film	Director	Producer	Writer	Notes
2004	Marie	Yes	Unknown		
2005	Black Cherry	Yes	Unknown		
2005	Still	Yes	Yes	Yes	
2009	Until the Morning Comes	Yes	No	Yes	
2011	Borrowed Time	Yes	No	No	
2015	The Fox Exploits the Tiger's Might	Yes	No	Yes	
2016	The Getaway	Yes	Unknown		

=== Television ===
Year	Title	Episode/s	Director	Writer	Network
2017	Switch	12 episodes	No	Yes	Viu
2018	Halustik		Yes	No	Viu
2020	Gossip Girl Indonesia	3 episodes	No	Script associate	GoPlay
2025	Ratu Ratu Queens: The Series	6 episodes	Yes	No	Netflix
