= Jalan Pulang =

2025 Indonesian horror drama film

- Theatrical release poster
- Directed by: Jeropoint
- Screenplay by: Mhd Arjunanta
- Produced by: Agung Saputra
- Starring: Shareefa Daanish; Sujiwo Tejo; Luna Maya; Taskya Namya; Teuku Rifnu Wikana; Jajang C. Noer; Kiki Narendra; Ruth Marini; Saskia Chadwick; Raffan Al Aryan
- Production companies: Leo Pictures; Legacy Pictures
- Release date: June 19, 2025 (Indonesia)
- Country: Indonesia
- Language: Indonesian

Jalan Pulang (English: The Way Home) is a 2025 Indonesian supernatural horror drama film directed by Jeropoint in his directorial debut. The film stars Shareefa Daanish, Sujiwo Tejo, Luna Maya, Taskya Namya, Teuku Rifnu Wikana, Jajang C. Noer, Kiki Narendra, Ruth Marini, and Saskia Chadwick. It was released in Indonesia on 19 June 2025.

== Synopsis ==
Lastini is devastated by the mysterious and sudden death of her husband, Edward. Before she can recover from the grief, her daughter Arum falls ill under unexplained circumstances. Medical treatment fails, and Lastini begins to believe that Arum’s condition is caused by supernatural forces.

To save her daughter before her upcoming leap-year birthday—which is believed to be a critical moment—Lastini embarks on a perilous journey across Java. Accompanied by her two other children, Lia and Rama, they seek out spiritual healers and ancient knowledge. Along the way, the family confronts terrifying spirits, psychological torment, and deep emotional trials. Ultimately, they uncover shocking truths that change their lives forever.

== Cast ==
- Luna Maya as Lastini
- Shareefa Daanish as Marsinah
- Taskya Namya as Lia, Lastini's adoptive daughter
- Sujiwo Tejo as Subagir
- Teuku Rifnu Wikana as Djatmiko
- Jajang C. Noer as Ruhannah
- Kiki Narendra as Ki Rustaman
- Ruth Marini as Suhana
- Saskia Chadwick as Arum, Lastini's daughter
- Raffan Al Aryan as Rama, Lastini's son
