= Sore: A Wife from the Future =

2025 film by Yandy Laurens

- Theatrical release poster
- Directed by: Yandy Laurens
- Written by: Yandy Laurens
- Based on: Sore: Istri dari Masa Depan by Yandy Laurens
- Produced by: Suryana Paramita
- Starring: Sheila Dara Aisha; Dion Wiyoko; Goran Bogdan; Livio Badurina; Lara Nekic; Borko Nekic; Mathias Muchus; Maya Hasan
- Cinematography: Dimas Bagus Triatma
- Edited by: Hendra Adhi Susanto
- Music by: Ofel Obaja Setiawan
- Production companies: Cerita Films; Slingshot Pictures; Imajinari Productions; Miles Films; Studio Artemis; Jagartha; Trinity Entertainment; Dwidaya Amadeo Gemintang
- Distributed by: Primeworks Studios (Malaysia)
- Release date: 10 July 2025 (Indonesia)
- Running time: 119 minutes
- Country: Indonesia
- Languages: Indonesian; Croatian; English

Sore: A Wife from the Future (Indonesian: Sore: Istri dari Masa Depan) is a 2025 Indonesian romantic science fantasy film written and directed by Yandy Laurens, based on his 2017 web series. Dion Wiyoko reprised his role as Jonathan, while Sheila Dara Aisha replaced Tika Bravani who portrayed Sore in the web series. It tells the story of Jonathan, a man who one day wakes up to find a woman beside him who claims to be his wife from the future.

The film was theatrically released in Indonesia on 10 July 2025. It received eight nominations at the 2025 Indonesian Film Festival, including Best Picture. It was selected as the Indonesian submission for the Best International Feature Film at the 98th Academy Awards, but it was not nominated.

== Plot ==
Jonathan is an Indonesian photographer living in Zagreb, Croatia, whose daily life is defined by heavy smoking, frequent drinking, sleep deprivation, and a lack of exercise. One morning, he awakens to find an unfamiliar woman named Sore in his bedroom. She claims to be his wife from the future. Jonathan dismisses the story, assuming she has been sent by Karlo, a friend and agent who often connects him with clients.

Sore follows Jonathan throughout the day. When he meets his girlfriend Elsa at a café, Sore interrupts and introduces herself as his wife, asserting that they are married in Indonesia. Humiliated, Elsa leaves. Unable to drive Sore away, Jonathan finally listens to her. Sore demonstrates intimate knowledge of his habits and personal history, gradually convincing him that she is not a stranger.

Sore begins pushing Jonathan to adopt a healthier lifestyle, disposing of his cigarettes and alcohol, enforcing regular exercise, and regulating his sleep. Although Jonathan initially resents the intrusion, he slowly responds to her concern and companionship. One night, he secretly smokes a hidden cigarette. When Sore discovers this, she discards it and “resets” time. Jonathan awakens to the same morning in which Sore first appeared, unaware that the day has already occurred. It is revealed that Sore is trapped in a time loop, repeatedly returning to this moment.

Sore explains that Jonathan dies in the future from a chronic illness caused by his self-destructive habits. She has traveled back in time to prevent his death so that they can grow old together. Across successive loops, Sore experiments with different ways to reform Jonathan’s behavior, but each attempt ultimately fails. In one iteration, she uncovers photographs annotated with Jonathan’s handwritten reflections, revealing unresolved resentment toward his father and explaining his self-imposed exile in Croatia. Realizing this emotional wound underlies his self-destructive lifestyle, Sore shifts her goal toward guiding Jonathan to reconcile with his father.

With each repetition, however, the loops grow shorter. Sore is never able to bring Jonathan to meet his father before time resets. When the cycle can no longer continue, she leaves Jonathan a final message, urging him not to forget her. Jonathan eventually awakens alone, with no trace of Sore. He ends his relationship with Elsa and confides in Karlo about a persistent sense of loss he cannot explain. He then transforms his life: abandoning alcohol and cigarettes, exercising regularly, and resolving to repair his relationship with his father. Jonathan returns to Jakarta and maintains his new way of living.

Years later, Jonathan holds his first photography exhibition in Jakarta. Among the visitors is a present-day version of Sore, who has no memory of him. Drawn by a sense of familiarity, Jonathan approaches her. As they converse before one of his photographs, he introduces himself and extends his hand. When they touch, memories of the time loops return, and the two embrace.

== Cast ==
- Sheila Dara Aisha as Sore. Aisha replaces Tika Bravani, who portrayed the character in the web series.
- Dion Wiyoko as Jonathan Riady
- Goran Bogdan as Karlo
- Livio Badurina as Marko
- Lara Nekić as Elsa
- Mathias Muchus as Seno, Jonathan's father

== Production ==
In November 2024, it was announced that Yandy Laurens would direct and write a film adaptation of his web series, Sore: Istri dari Masa Depan. The production of the film Sore: Istri dari Masa Depan was carried out in stages. According to an interview, the production process began in March 2024 and continued through February 2025. In producing Sore, Cerita Films received support from Slingshot Pictures, Imajinari Productions, Miles Films, Studio Artemis, Jagartha, Trinity Entertainment, and Dwidaya Amadeo Gemintang. Cerita Films also involved Melyana Tjahyadikarta, Queen Yeap, Agustinus Lee Martin, Ernest Prakasa, Mira Lesmana, Asim Kemas, Fx Iwan, Yonathan Nugroho, and Hotma Abigail Sirait as executive producers. In addition, Asri Welas, Maya Hasan, and Sulung Landung served as associate producers.

Principal photography mainly took place in Zagreb and Grožnjan, Croatia, featuring old buildings and narrow streets that frequently appear throughout the film, while Bar Vero aModoMio was used for a scene in which Sore and Jonathan dine at an outdoor restaurant. Filming locations also included Jakarta, Indonesia and Finland. It began in September and concluded in October 2024.

The main poster, featuring a spiral staircase, was photographed at Artotel Thamrin Jakarta.

== Release ==
Sore had its theatrical release in Indonesia on 10 July 2025. It surpassed a million admissions in nine days of release. It will have its European premiere at the 55th International Film Festival Rotterdam at the Limelight section.

The film was one of the first premiere exclusive releases and made available to rent via Letterboxd Video Store on 10 December 2025.

== Accolades ==
Award / Film Festival	Date of ceremony	Category	Recipient(s)	Result	Ref.
Festival Film Bandung	31 October 2025	Highly Commended Film	Sore: A Wife from the Future	Won	
Festival Film Bandung	31 October 2025	Highly Commended Director	Yandy Laurens	Nominated	
Festival Film Bandung	31 October 2025	Highly Commended Screenplay	Yandy Laurens	Nominated	
Festival Film Bandung	31 October 2025	Highly Commended Leading Actress	Sheila Dara Aisha	Won (Note: Tied with Aurora Ribero for Komang)	
Festival Film Bandung	31 October 2025	Highly Commended Original Score	Ofel Obaja Setiawan	Won	
Festival Film Bandung	31 October 2025	Highly Commended Editing	Hendra Adhi Susanto	Nominated	
Festival Film Bandung	31 October 2025	Highly Commended Cinematography	Dimas Bagus Triatma Yoga	Nominated	
Festival Film Wartawan Indonesia	9 November 2025	Best Film – Drama	Suryana Paramita, producer; Cerita Films, Slingshot Pictures, Imajinari Productions, Miles Films, Studio Artemis, Jagartha, Trinity Entertainment, Dwidaya Amadeo Gemintang, production companies	Won	
Festival Film Wartawan Indonesia	9 November 2025	Best Director – Drama	Yandy Laurens	Won	
Festival Film Wartawan Indonesia	9 November 2025	Best Screenplay – Drama	Yandy Laurens	Won	
Festival Film Wartawan Indonesia	9 November 2025	Best Actor – Drama	Dion Wiyoko	Nominated	
Festival Film Wartawan Indonesia	9 November 2025	Best Actress – Drama	Sheila Dara Aisha	Won	
Festival Film Wartawan Indonesia	9 November 2025	Best Editing – Drama	Hendra Adhi Susanto	Won	
Festival Film Wartawan Indonesia	9 November 2025	Best Cinematography – Drama	Dimas Bagus Triatma	Nominated	
Indonesian Film Festival	20 November 2025	Best Picture	Suryana Paramita	Nominated	
Indonesian Film Festival	20 November 2025	Best Director	Yandy Laurens	Won	
Indonesian Film Festival	20 November 2025	Best Actor	Dion Wiyoko	Nominated	
Indonesian Film Festival	20 November 2025	Best Actress	Sheila Dara Aisha	Won	
Indonesian Film Festival	20 November 2025	Best Adapted Screenplay	Yandy Laurens	Nominated	
Indonesian Film Festival	20 November 2025	Best Cinematography	Dimas Bagus Triatma	Nominated	
Indonesian Film Festival	20 November 2025	Best Editing	Hendra Adhi Susanto	Won	
Indonesian Film Festival	20 November 2025	Best Theme Song	Gerald Situmorang, Iga Massardi, and Asteriska for "Terbuang dalam Waktu"	Won	
Jogja-NETPAC Asian Film Festival	6 December 2025	Indonesian Screen Award for Best Poster	Evan Wijaya and Jozz Felix	Won	
Film Pilihan Tempo	26 January 2026	Film Pilihan Tempo	Sore: A Wife from the Future	Nominated	
Film Pilihan Tempo	26 January 2026	Best Director	Yandy Laurens	Nominated	
Film Pilihan Tempo	26 January 2026	Best Screenplay	Yandy Laurens	Nominated	
Film Pilihan Tempo	26 January 2026	Best Actress	Sheila Dara Aisha	Nominated	

== See also ==
- List of submissions to the 98th Academy Awards for Best International Feature Film
- List of Indonesian submissions for the Academy Award for Best International Feature Film
