= Lucinta Luna =

Indonesian actress (born 1989)

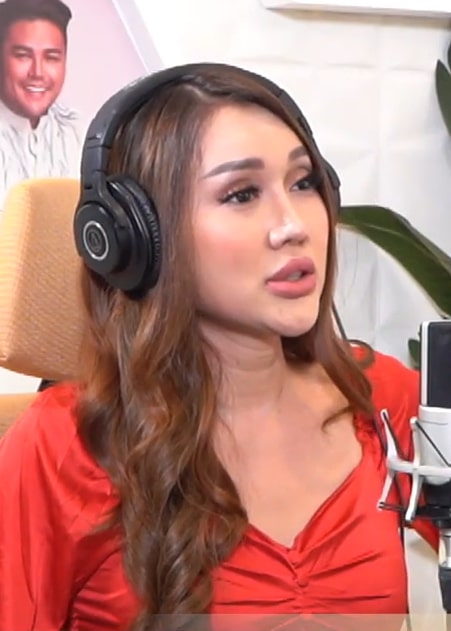
- Luna in 2021
- Born: 19 June 1989 (age 36); Jakarta, Indonesia
- Occupations: Actress; model; singer; comedian
- Spouse: Bigham (m. 2019; div. 2019)

Ayluna Putri (born 16 June 1989), better known by her stage name Lucinta Luna, is an Indonesian actor, model, singer, and comedian. She is known as a transgender woman.

Luna started her career as a singer and dancer by participating in a reality show with the nickname Cleo Vitri, Luna then formed a duo group called Dua Bunga (English: Two Flowers) along with singer Ratna Pandita.

== Early life ==
Lucinta Luna was born as Muhammad Fatah on 16 June 1989 in Jakarta, Indonesia, to Djoneha (26 December 1953 – 13 April 2018) and Muntoha (died June 2001). She was the eighth of ten children.

== Personal life ==
Luna married a Filipino man named Bigham on 21 March 2019; they divorced after one week.

== Controversy ==
=== Drug case ===
On 11 February 2020, Luna along with three others was arrested by police and taken into custody due to alleged possession and consumption of ecstasy.

She was found guilty and was sentenced to one year and six months in prison and a fine of IDR 10 million, Luna was released from Rutan Kelas IIA Pondok Bambu on 11 February 2021 for her good conduct.
