= Arswendo Atmowiloto =

Indonesian journalist and writer (1948–2019)

- Arswendo Atmowiloto in 2016
- Born: Sarwendo; 26 November 1948; Surakarta, Central Java, Indonesia
- Died: 19 July 2019 (aged 70); Jakarta, Indonesia

Arswendo Atmowiloto (26 November 1948 – 19 July 2019) was an Indonesian journalist and writer. Considered one of Indonesia's most productive writers, he began his literary career in the 1970s and entered journalism in the 1980s. Following a controversial publication in 1990, he was imprisoned for subversion until 1993, though he continued his literary and journalistic work during and after his sentence.

== Early life and education ==
Arswendo was born as Sarwendo in Surakarta, Central Java on 26 November 1948. He later changed his forename to Arswendo and adopted his father's name, Atmowiloto, as a surname. After graduating from high school, Arswendo enrolled at the faculty of language and literature at a teacher's institute in Surakarta, but he did not complete his degree. He also undertook a creative writing course at the University of Iowa.

== Career ==
After he dropped out, Arswendo worked at various jobs, including in factories and as a ball boy. In 1971, he published his first short story, titled Sleko, in the Bahari magazine. Starting in 1972, he became the chair of the literature workshop at the Central Java cultural center in Solo, and by 1974 he had started working as a consultant to publishing house Subentra Citra Media. During the 1970s, Arswendo wrote Keluarga Cemara, a popular tale of a small family living away from Jakarta, which was later became a franchise when adapted into a TV series and a film.

During the 1980s, Arswendo wrote novel adaptations of the films Serangan Fajar and Pengkhianatan G30S/PKI. By 1986, Arswendo had become the chief editor of the Monitor magazine and in 1988 also joined the editorial team of the Senang magazine. The former was initially a newspaper, which Arswendo turned into a tabloid-format publication covering movies, television, and entertainment topics, with great success. Tempo wrote in 1990 that Arswendo was "Indonesia's most productive writer".

=== Monitor affair and prison ===
On 15 October 1990, Monitor printed a list titled "Here We Are: 50 Figures Most Admired by Our Readers". Out of the 50 figures in the list, Arswendo himself ranked 10th, placed right above Muhammad (11th). This particular placement resulted in criticism from Muslim leaders and figures (with the notable exception of Abdurrahman Wahid, who argued that Monitor had a right to publish). Angry calls and various protests began to reach Monitor's office as soon as 17 October, just two days after the publication.

Arswendo made a public appearance on television on 19 October, publicly apologizing for publishing the poll results "without editing", with the tabloid issuing statements of apology in major newspapers across the country. The following day, major protests occurred in Jakarta and Bandung, and staff members of Monitor began to evacuate the publication office's inventory on the night of 21 October, with the edition of 22 October of Monitor being largely filled with apologetic statements. On 22 October, groups of young Muslim protested on the streets and ransacked Monitor's office. Monitor, which then had a circulation of 470,000–720,000, discontinued publication after it lost its government-issued license (with the license revoked on 23 October by then-Minister of Information Harmoko, who was a shareholder of Monitor) and Arswendo was dismissed from Gramedia. Local press around the time described Arswendo as "the Salman Rushdie of Indonesia".

He was officially taken into police custody on 26 October 1990, though he noted in an interview that he was not imprisoned prior to his sentencing – except for one day during a media visit. By April 1991, Arswendo was charged with subversion, and was sentenced to five years in prison. The court noted that Arswendo was responsible for the poll results and could have edited them to prevent any provocation of his young readers. His trial was one of the most well-guarded trials in Indonesian history, with Tempo reporting that around 1,000 security personnel were involved in guarding the proceedings.

During his time in prison, Arswendo continued to produce literary works, writing stories themed around absurdities and humorous anecdotes. One of his in-prison works, Menghitung Hari, which was themed on prison life, was published in 1993, and by 1995 was adapted as a telenovela on SCTV. On that year, the show received an award as the best show, and it was reported that celebrations were held in the prison. In total, he wrote around 20 books during his sentence, mostly under pseudonyms. Arswendo was released from prison in August 1993.

=== Post-prison ===
Arswendo returned to literature and journalism after his release, first leading the previously struggling tabloid Bintang Indonesia for three years before founding his own media company Atmo Bismo Sangotrah in 1998. The company published several tabloids, including a children's tabloid Bianglala, Ina (later Ino), and Pro-TV, though only Ino continued in publication following the departure of one of Arswendo's business partners.

=== Illness and death ===
Arswendo died on 19 July 2019 at his home in Jakarta, about three weeks after an announcement that he had been suffering from prostate cancer for several months. His body was buried the following day at the San Diego Hills cemetery in Karawang.

== Personal life ==
Arswendo was a Roman Catholic. He married Agnes Sri Hartini in 1971, and had three children.
