= Jumbo (2025 film) =

2025 Indonesian animated film

- Promotional release poster
- Directed by: Ryan Adriandhy
- Written by: Ryan Adriandhy; Widya Arifianti
- Produced by: Anggia Kharisma; Novia Puspa Sari
- Starring: Prince Poetiray; Muhammad Adhiyat; Graciella Abigail; Yusuf Ozkan; Quinn Salman
- Cinematography: Arnand Pratikto
- Edited by: Teguh Rahardjo
- Music by: Ofel Obaja
- Production companies: Visinema Studios; Springboard Entertainment; Anami Films
- Release date: 31 March 2025
- Running time: 102 minutes
- Country: Indonesia
- Language: Indonesian
- Box office: US$26 million (estimated)

Jumbo is a 2025 Indonesian animated fantasy adventure film directed by Ryan Adriandhy in his directorial debut, from a screenplay he wrote with Widya Arifianti, and produced by Visinema Studios, Springboard Entertainment and Anami Films. It was released on 31 March 2025 in Indonesia. The film features the voice of Prince Poetiray as Don, a boy who attempts to stage a play in a local talent show after feeling underestimated by his peers.

It became the highest-grossing Indonesian film of all-time, replacing KKN di Desa Penari. It also replaced Frozen 2 as the highest-grossing animated film in Indonesia. Jumbo became the first animated film to receive a nomination for the Citra Award for Best Picture. It was also nominated for six other awards.

== Plot ==
In the year 2000, Don, a 10-year-old orphan, was often underestimated because of his large body. Don has a storybook inherited from his parents, which is full of illustrations and magical stories. The book is not only a memory from his parents, but also a source of inspiration and escape for Don from a world that feels unfriendly because he is often underestimated by his peers.

Don tries to prove his ability by joining a talent show, where he plans to perform a stage play inspired by the storybook, but when one of his bullying classmates steals the book, he is left in despair. With the support of his Grandma and his friends, Nurman and Mae, Don sets out to retrieve the book. In the midst of this search, he meets Meri (a little ghost girl), who asks for his help in finding her parents after someone has captured them. From this meeting, a magical adventure begins, changing Don's view of himself and teaching him the meaning of true friendship, courage, and self-confidence, and strengthening newly formed bonds.

== Voice cast ==
The following actors voice the characters in Jumbo.

- Prince Poetiray as Don
  - Den Bagus Satrio Sasono as a 4-year-old Don
- Quinn Salman as Meri
- Graciella Abigail as Mae
- Yusuf Özkan as Nurman
- Muhammad Adhiyat as Atta
- Ratna Riantiarno as Don's grandmother
- Kiki Narendra as Rusli
- Angga Yunanda as Acil
- Bunga Citra Lestari as Don's mother
- Ariel as Don's father
- Ariyo Wahab as Meri's father
- Cinta Laura Kiehl as Meri's mother
- Rachel Amanda and Aci Resti as talent show crews
- Angga Dwimas Sasongko, Chicco Jerikho, and Ganindra Bimo provide the vocal effects of Nurman's goats (all uncredited)

== Production ==
Development of Jumbo began in April 2020. Visinema Pictures announced the production of the film had begun in September 2021. In November 2021, Visinema Pictures released the film's first look. In September 2022, singer Ariel was announced to voice Don's father. The film was projected to release in 2023.

An exclusive sneak peek of Jumbo was screened at the 19th Jogja-NETPAC Asian Film Festival on 4 December 2024.

== Release ==
Jumbo was theatrically released in Indonesia on 31 March 2025, coinciding with Eid al-Fitr. Magic Fair handled the film's international sales. The film achieved a million admissions in seven days, making it the third best-selling Indonesian films in 2025, as well as the best-selling Indonesian animated film of all time and the best-selling Indonesian films of all time. It reached more than two million admissions on the eleventh day of its release. Jumbo became the highest-grossing Southeast Asian animation film of all time for earning over $8 million, surpassing Malaysian 2022 film Mechamato Movie.

The film was also released theatrically in 17 other countries including Malaysia, Singapore, Brunei Darussalam, Russia, Ukraine, the Baltic countries, and countries in Central Asia in June 2025, the film would be also released on further 40 other countries, including the Philippines in which the releasing rights and marketing sales of the film would be handled jointly by ABS-CBN Studios, Star Cinema, GMA Pictures, Studio Viva and Viva International Pictures.

In Vietnam, Jumbo was screened in various Vietnamese cinema chains, starting on 8 August 2025, in conjunction with the 80th Indonesian's Independence Day and 70th anniversary of Vietnam-Indonesia relationship.

Netflix acquired the film's distribution rights, releasing it on 25 December 2025.

== Reception ==
=== Media attention ===
Major media outlets had widely reported on its ground-breaking box office revenue.

In the mean time, world media has focused on the success of Jumbo, praising the movie. French newswire service, AFP, claiming the movie has "stood out" the whole South East Asian film industry, which was "flooded with Hollywood blockbusters and local horror movies". Britain's international news agency, Reuters, reported on the success of the movie. Reuters' reporter also considered the movie as a signal to boost Indonesian's local animation industry. Vietnamese TV channel, ANTV (or People's Police Television Channel - Truyền hình Công an Nhân dân, in Vietnamese), reported on its success, claiming Jumbo is not only the pride of Indonesian but also "the turning point for South East Asian animation industry, opening up the competitive edge in the international market". Hong Kong SAR-based South China Morning Post also claimed Jumbo could "bring the regional animation powerhouse’s ambition closer to fruition." American news magazine Deadline ran the headline, "‘Jumbo’, Southeast Asia’s Highest-Grossing Animated Film, Wants To Be A “Movement” Not Just A Movie" for their report on the movie. Japanese's Nikkei Asia claiming the movie has "flipped the script on Hollywood".

== Accolades ==
Award / Film Festival	Date of ceremony	Category	Recipient(s)	Result	Ref.
Festival Film Bandung	31 October 2025	Highly Commended Film	Jumbo	Nominated	
Festival Film Bandung	31 October 2025	Highly Commended Director	Ryan Adriandhy	Nominated	
Festival Film Bandung	31 October 2025	Highly Commended Screenplay	Ryan Adriandhy and Widya Arifianti	Won	
Anugerah Musik Indonesia	19 November 2025	Production Work of the Year	"Selalu Ada Di Nadimu" by Prince Poetiray and Quinn Salman	Nominated	
Anugerah Musik Indonesia	19 November 2025	Newcomer of the Year	Prince Poetiray for "Selalu Ada Di Nadimu"	Won	
Anugerah Musik Indonesia	19 November 2025	Best Pop Duo or Group or Vocal Group or Collaboration	"Kumpul Bocah" by Maliq & D'Essentials	Nominated	
Anugerah Musik Indonesia	19 November 2025	Best Children's Music Duo, Group or Collaboration	"Selalu Ada Di Nadimu" by Prince Poetiray and Quinn Salman	Won	
Anugerah Musik Indonesia	19 November 2025	Best Children's Music Songwriter	Ifa Fachir and Simhala Avadana for "Dengar Hatimu"	Nominated	
Anugerah Musik Indonesia	19 November 2025	Best Children's Music Songwriter	Anindyo Baskoro, Arya Aditya Ramadhya, and Ilman Ibrahim Isa for "Selalu Ada Di Nadimu"	Won	
Anugerah Musik Indonesia	19 November 2025	Best Children's Music Producer	Ifa Fachir for "Dengar Hatimu"	Nominated	
Anugerah Musik Indonesia	19 November 2025	Best Children's Music Producer	laleilmanino for "Selalu Ada Di Nadimu"	Nominated	
Anugerah Musik Indonesia	19 November 2025	Best Production Work for Visual Media	"Kumpul Bocah" by Maliq & D'Essentials	Nominated	
Anugerah Musik Indonesia	19 November 2025	Best Production Work for Visual Media	"Selalu Ada Di Nadimu" by Prince Poetiray and Quinn Salman	Won	
Anugerah Musik Indonesia	19 November 2025	Best Collaboration Production Work	"Selalu Ada Di Nadimu" by Prince Poetiray and Quinn Salman	Nominated	
Anugerah Musik Indonesia	19 November 2025	Best Film Score Album	Jumbo: Music from the Motion Picture	Won	
Anugerah Musik Indonesia	19 November 2025	Best Record Producer	laleilmanino for "Selalu Ada Di Nadimu"	Nominated	
Indonesian Film Festival	20 November 2025	Best Picture	Anggia Kharisma and Novia Puspa Sari	Nominated	
Indonesian Film Festival	20 November 2025	Best Director	Ryan Adriandhy	Nominated	
Indonesian Film Festival	20 November 2025	Best Original Screenplay	Ryan Adriandhy and Widya Arifianti	Nominated	
Indonesian Film Festival	20 November 2025	Best Original Score	Ofel Obaja	Nominated	
Indonesian Film Festival	20 November 2025	Best Theme Song	Ifa Fachir and Simhala Avadana for "Dengar Hatimu"	Nominated	
Indonesian Film Festival	20 November 2025	Best Theme Song	Anindyo Baskoro, Arya Aditya Ramadhya, and Ilman Ibrahim Isa for "Selalu Ada Di Nadimu"	Nominated	
Indonesian Film Festival	20 November 2025	Best Animated Feature	Ryan Adriandhy, Anggia Kharisma, and Novia Puspa Sari	Won	
Indonesian Film Festival	20 November 2025	Antemas Award	Jumbo	Won	
