= Dion Wiyoko =

Indonesian actor (born 1984)

- Born: Dion Wiyoko; May 3, 1984 (age 42); Surabaya, East Java, Indonesia
- Occupations: Actor; Model; Presenter
- Years active: 2008 – present
- Spouse: Fiona Anthony

Dion Wiyoko (born in Surabaya, May 3, 1984) is an Indonesian actor of Chinese descent who started his career as a model.

== Biography ==
Dion Wiyoko started his career as a model in some magazines such as Aneka Yess, Femina, and many more. Continuing his acting in FTV and soap opera, his first movie is Kuntilanak Beranak, released in 2009, followed by his next movie, Serigala Terakhir where he played as Lukman on the same year. In 2011, he took part in Khalifah where he played with Marsha Timothy, Ben Joshua, and Indra Herlam.

Dion became a model in clip videos such as ”Galih dan Ratna”, performed by D'Cinnamons, music group, and Ya ya ya, performed by GIGI.

Wiyoko ended his bachelorhood and after that proposed marriage to his lover Fiona Anthony. His marriage was held at St. Francis Xavier Church, Denpasar, Bali.

== Filmography ==
=== Movies ===
- Kuntilanak Beranak (2009)
- Serigala Terakhir (2009)
- Khalifah (2011)
- Hi5teria (2012)
- Hattrick (2012)
- Cinta di Saku Celana (2012)
- Perahu Kertas (2012)
- Loe Gue End (2012)
- Jakarta Hati (2012)
- Cinta Mati (2013)
- Isyarat (2013)
- Haji Backpacker (2014)
- Merry Riana (2014)
- Hijab (2015)
- Love and Faith (2015)
- Air dan Api (2015)
- Cek Toko Sebelah (2016)
- Winter in Tokyo (2016) as Nishimura Kazuto
- Last Barongsai (2017)
- Terbang (2018)
- Susi Susanti: Love All (2018)
- Imperfect (2019)
- Cek Toko Sebelah 2 (2022)
- Falling In Love Like In Movies (2023)
- Sore: Istri dari Masa Depan (2025)
- A Normal Woman (2025)

=== Soap operas ===
- Cinta Bunga - MD Entertainment (2008)
- Cinta Maia - MD Entertainment (2008)
- Kasih dan Amara - MD Entertainment (2009)
- Go Go Girls - Transinema (2011)

=== FTV ===
- Semua Sayang Soraya - DSX Studio (2008)
- Semua Tentang Lestari - DSX Studio (2008)
- Tapi Bukan Dia - DSX Studio (2008)
- Mengejar Cinta Dara - DSX Studio (2008)
- Cintaku kepentok Nenek - DSX Studio (2009)
- Cowo Super Setia - Frame Ritz (2009)
- Cintaku Tumbuh Di Kebun Teh - DSX Studio (2009)
- Joni Jengki - MNC Pictures (2012)
- Cooking Clas Coto Betawi - Starvision Plus (2012)
- Kalau Jodoh Jangan Galak - Starvision Plus (2013)
- Kutunggu Kau Di Bawah Pohon Duren - Starvision Plus (2013)

=== Clip videos ===
- ”Galih dan Ratna” - D'Cinnamons (2009)
- ”Gatal” - Ruben Onsu (2009)
- ”Ya.. Ya.. Ya..” - Gigi (2009)
- ”Pelangi” (English: Rainbow) - Ardina Rasti (2009)

=== Television series ===
- What We Lose to Love (2022)

== Awards and nominations ==
Year	Award	Category	Work	Result
2017	Indonesian Film Festival	Citra Award for Best Supporting Actor	Cek Toko Sebelah	Nominated
2020	Indonesian Film Festival	Citra Award for Best Leading Actor	Susi Susanti: Love All	Nominated
