= Sugar Mill =

2025 Indonesian supernatural horror film

- Poster
- Directed by: Awi Suryadi
- Screenplay by: Catfish Laila
- Based on: Pabrik Gula by SimpleMan
- Produced by: Manoj Punjabi
- Starring: Arbani Yasiz; Ersya Aurelia; Erika Carlina; Bukie B. Mansyur; Wavi Zihan
- Cinematography: Arfian
- Edited by: Firdauzi Trizkiyanto; Azka Amar Kusuma
- Music by: Ricky Lionardi
- Production company: MD Pictures
- Distributed by: Antenna Entertainment (Malaysia, Brunei, Singapura); EST N8 (Amerika Utara)
- Release date: 31 March 2025
- Country: Indonesia
- Language: Indonesian

Sugar Mill (Indonesian: Pabrik Gula) is 2025 Indonesian supernatural horror film directed by Awi Suryadi based on the viral story of the same name by SimpleMan. The film stars Arbani Yasiz, Ersya Aurelia, and Erika Carlina. The story focuses on a group of seasonal workers who come to an old sugar factory in the countryside to work during the harvest season. It premiered in Indonesian cinemas on March 31, 2025, and was watched by 4.7 million viewers, making it the third-highest-grossing Indonesian film of 2025.

== Cast ==
- Arbani Yasiz as Fadhil
- Ersya Aurelia as Endah, assistant factory manager
- Erika Carlina as Naning, the beautiful admin that Franky likes
- Bukie B. Mansyur as Hendra, Wati's future husband
- Wavi Zihan as Wati, Hendra's future wife
- Arif Alfiansyah as Dwi
- Benidictus Siregar as Franky/Mulyono, a laborer who is the son of a tuna fish seller
- Sadana Agung as Karno, the factory security guard
- Yono Bakrie as Rano, the factory security guard
- Vonny Anggraini as Mrs. Marni, the factory production manager
- Budi Ros as Mbah Samin, a smart person who is a protector at the factory
- Dewi Pakis as Mbah Jinah, a smart person who is a protector at the factory
- Azela Putri as Rani
- Gilang Devialdy as Eko
- Hayati Azis as Nyi Wilengi
- Pratito Wibowo as Dalboh

== Production ==
The filming process was carried out in factories that were still active and former abandoned sugar factories, where the filming locations chosen by the production team were in Cirebon, West Java, and Gondang Winangoen, Klaten, Central Java. The Gondang Winangoen Sugar Factory, which was one of the filming locations, is one of the oldest sugar factories in Indonesia, which was founded in 1860 by a Dutch colonial company. For the needs of the scene, the production team bought four hectares of sugar cane from farmers to be able to hold the sugar cane from being harvested.

== Release ==
It premiered on March 31, 2025, coinciding with Eid al-Fitr 1446 H, along with other Eid films, namely Qodrat 2, Jumbo, Komang, and Norma: Antara Mertua dan Menantu. This film was released in two different versions, namely the regular version which passed censorship by the Film Censorship Institute with a classification of D17+, and the Uncut version (intact) which passed censorship with a classification of D21+. Antenna Entertainment has held the distribution rights for this film for screening in Malaysia, Singapore, and Brunei. It was screened in these three countries on April 3, 2025. Meanwhile, EST N8 which holds the distribution rights for the North American region screened this film on April 18, 2025. It was broadcast globally via Netflix starting August 7, 2025.

== Reception ==
=== Box office ===
Following its strong commercial run in Indonesia, where it grossed over $7 million at the local box office, Pabrik Gula (released internationally as Sugar Mill) secured wider global distribution. Entertainment company EST N8 acquired the international sales rights for the film, facilitating its acquisition by the horror-focused streaming service Shudder for release in North America and other territories.

=== Critical response ===
Don Anelli of Asian Movie Pulse gave the film a generally positive review, describing it as a "highly enjoyable genre effort" with a strong atmosphere of unease and solid supernatural sequences. He praised the screenplay for effectively building tension through the plantation’s dark history, as well as the film's unique integration of local folklore, black magic rituals, and demonic entities. However, Anelli criticized the movie's pacing and runtime, noting that it felt "overlong and bloated" due to an excessive number of subplots and a chaotic, overstuffed climax that made the plot difficult to follow.

A review from Herald Sulsel characterized Pabrik Gula as a horror-comedy that struggles to break free from long-standing genre clichés. While the review acknowledged the film's attempts to balance eerie supernatural elements with comedic relief, it noted that the narrative ultimately feels trapped in a familiar and predictable formula, preventing it from offering anything genuinely new to the genre.

Writing for Suara Merdeka Jatim Mohammad Hayun highlighted how Pabrik Gula effectively utilizes its industrial setting to uncover dark, long-hidden secrets. The publication noted that the film succeeds in building an unsettling atmosphere by intertwining the grim history of the sugar mill with local supernatural occurrences. However, the review also pointed out that while the premise of uncovering these dark secrets is compelling, the execution occasionally falls back on familiar horror tropes, which slightly diminishes the impact of its central mystery.

=== Audience response ===
On Letterboxd, audience reception for the film (released internationally as Sugar Mill) was generally mixed to positive. Many viewers praised the film's eerie atmosphere, solid practical effects, and its deep immersion in Indonesian folklore. The horror sequences and the integration of traditional cultural elements were highlighted as major strengths that kept the audience engaged. Conversely, several users pointed out that the film suffered from a bloated narrative and unnecessary subplots, which hindered the overall pacing and made the third act feel overly chaotic.

Ygraine Hackett-Cantabrana of the What a Scream Podcast, in a review featured on Rotten Tomatoes, described Pabrik Gula as a "stereotypical, middle-of-the-road supernatural horror." While she commended the film's high production values, cinematography, and acting performances, she noted that the story follows a predictable formula, relying too heavily on James Wan-style jump scares that lose their impact over time due to a lack of character and plot development.
