= D'Cinnamons =

- Origin: Bandung, Indonesia
- Genres: Acoustic, Folk
- Years active: 2007-present
- Labels: Aquarius Musikindo
- Members: Diana Widoera A.K.A. Dodo Riana Mayasari Ismail Bonaventura A.K.A. Bona

D'Cinnamons is an Indonesian unplugged-acoustic band established in September 2004. The band consists of three members, two female and one male: Dodo (lead vocal and rhythms), Bona (lead guitar and vocal), and Nana (acoustic bass and vocal). Their debut album, Good Morning, was released in early 2007 with their first single, “Loving You”.

== Group history ==
Started as a cafe band, in 2004 D'Cinnamons played acoustic versions of most Top 40 songs in their hometown Bandung. Then In 2007 they decided to release their own songs on their debut album Good Morning. They reach popularity among Indonesian after they released the singles Selamanya Cinta in late 2007 as a soundtrack of the movie Cintapuccino. It won the most favorite soundtrack of the year in Indonesian Movie Award 2008.

After huge success they released singles Galih dan Ratna in 2009, Damai Tapi Gersang in 2010.

Their latest album Atlantis released in February 2012. it is produced by Suwardi Widjaja and Directed by Andi Riyanto.

== Discography ==
Album	Year
Good Morning	2007
OST.Cintapuccino	2007
Singles Galih dan Ratna	2009
Singles Damai Tapi Gersang	2010
Atlantis	2012

== Discography ==
Album	Song
Good Morning	Ku Yakin Cinta
Good Morning	MayDay I'm In Love
Good Morning	Loving You
Good Morning	Super Girl
Good Morning	Tak Takut
Good Morning	I.M.U.L
Good Morning	Good Morning
Good Morning	Semua Yang Ada
Good Morning	I Love You...
Good Morning	So Would You Let Me Be...

Album	Song
OST Cintapucino	Selamanya Cinta...

Album	Song
Singles	Galih dan Ratna

Album	Song
Singles	Damai Tapi Gersang

Album	Song
Atlantis	My Lovely Friend
Atlantis	Teman Hidup
Atlantis	Atlantis
Atlantis	The Wonderer
Atlantis	Kamulah Yang Sempurna
Atlantis	Aku Sungguh Bodoh
Atlantis	Dreamer
Atlantis	Pilih pilih pilih
Atlantis	Pasti Bisa
Atlantis	Langkah Baru
