= Keluarga Cemara (TV series) =

1996 Indonesian television series

- Created by: Arswendo Atmowiloto
- Starring: Adi Kurdi; Lia Waroka; Novia Kolopaking; Anneke Putri; Ceria Hade; Anisa Fujianti; Pudji Lestari
- Theme music composer: Harry Tjahjono; Nana Master; Suko
- Opening theme: "Hariku" (performed by Tiara cs) "Harta Berharga" (performed by Ceria Hade, Anisa Fujianti and Puji Lestari)
- Ending theme: "Hariku" (performed by Tiara cs) "Harta Berharga" (performed by Ceria Hade, Anisa Fujianti and Puji Lestari)
- Country of origin: Indonesia
- Original languages: Indonesian; Sundanese
- No. of seasons: 2
- No. of episodes: 412

Production
- Production locations: Sukabumi and Jakarta
- Running time: 20 minutes 40 minutes (Kembali ke Asal)
- Production company: PT. Atmo Chademas Persada

Original release
- Network: RCTI
- Release: 6 October 1996 – 2003
- Network: TV7
- Release: 2004 – 30 January 2005

Keluarga Cemara (literally translated as Cemara's Family) is an Indonesian television series which first aired from October 6, 1996, to February 28, 2005. Based on a serialized novel with same title by Arswendo Atmowiloto, the series was originally broadcast on RCTI from 1996 to 2003, and was continued under the title Keluarga Cemara: Kembali ke Asal (English: Cemara's Family is Back to Origin), which aired on TV7 in 2004 and 2005.

As the title implies, Keluarga Cemara tells the story of a girl named Cemara, with her family, who moved to start a new life in a small town after her father's business in the city went bankrupt. It stars Adi Kurdi, Cherrya Agustina Hendiawan, Anisa Fujianti, and Puji Lestari. Also featured Lia Waroka, Novia Kolopaking, and Anneke Putri who take turns playing the role of Mother (Emak) during the series.

Together with the Lorong Waktu and Si Doel Anak Sekolahan, Keluarga Cemara is often referred to as the renaissance of the Indonesian television series.

== Plot ==
The story of a rich family who became poor. Abah was once a successful and wealthy businessman in Jakarta. For some reason, Abah's business went bankrupt, and his family fell into poverty. Finally, Abah and his family decided to move to a village in a small town. Since that incident, all of Abah's family members have been trying to live their daily lives, with Abah working as a pedicab driver and Emak selling opaques with the assistance of her children, namely Euis, Cemara alias Ara, and Agil. But poverty does not change their hearts because they believe that the most valuable treasure is family.

== Cast ==
- Adi Kurdi as Abah
- Lia Waroka as Emak (episode 1–17, 284–412)
- Novia Kolopaking as Emak (episode 18–?)
- Anneke Putri as Emak (episode ?–283)
- Cherrya Agustina Hendiawan as Euis
- Anisa Fujianti as Cemara/Ara
- Puji Lestari as Agil
- Wina Hendrawan as Aunt Pressier
- Belita Ayu Selviana as Pipin Pressier
- Muslih Noor as Mr. Jana
- Rochmah Usman as Mrs.Salmah
- Nurani Sandra Dewi as Aunt Iyos (episode 1–17)
- Ulfie Syahrul as Aunt Iyos (episode 18–?)

== Remake ==
It was announced that Keluarga Cemara will be remade as a web series. The series will be produced by Visinema Pictures and directed by Ismail Basbeth. The series will be released on 24 September 2022 on Disney+ Hotstar.
