= 2017 Indonesian Movie Actors Awards =

Film industry award ceremony

11th Annual Indonesian Movie Actors Awards
- Date: May 18, 2017
- Location: Plenary Hall INews Center, Jakarta
- Country: Indonesia
- Hosted by: Daniel Mananta; Arie Untung
- Website: http://www.rcti.tv/imaa

Television/radio coverage
- Network: RCTI

The 2017 Indonesian Movie Actors Awards was the 11th annual Indonesian Movie Actors Awards show that was held at Plenary Hall INews Centre and organised by RCTI. With the theme Glamour of Indonesia this event was hosted by Daniel Mananta and Arie Untung. The event was attended by the CEO of MNC Group, Hary Tanoesoedibjo and the Chairman of the Indonesian Film Artists Association (PARFI) and the Indonesian Film and Television Employees (KFT), Febryan Adhitya.

In this awards show, the film Cek Toko Sebelah succeeded in becoming the Favorite Film of the Viewers' Choice. Meanwhile, Reza Rahadian won two trophies for the Best and the Favourite Actor category thanks to his role in the film My Stupid Boss. Bisma Karisma also won two awards for the Best and the Favourite Newcomer for his role in the film Juara.

== Judges ==
Name	Profession
Aditya Gumay	Director
Garin Nugroho	Director
Lukman Sardi	Actor
Salman Aristo	Scriptwriter
Sheila Timothy	President of the Indonesian Association of Film Producers

== Presenters ==
- Daniel Mananta
- Arie Untung
- Robby Purba
- Ayushita

== Performers ==
- NOAH
- Gamaliel Audrey Cantika
- Ari Lasso
- Maudy Ayunda
- Sheryl Sheinafia
- Ario Bayu
- Lala Karmela
- Berlian Hutauruk

== Winners and nominees ==
=== Best ===
Winners are listed first and highlighted in boldface.

Best Actor	Best Actress
**Reza Rahadian – My Stupid Boss**; Abimana Aryasatya – Warkop DKI Reborn: Jangkrik Boss! Part 1; Teuku Rifnu Wikana – Aku Ingin Ibu Pulang; Chicco Jerikho – Surat Cinta Untuk Kartini; Nino Fernandez – Wa'alaikumussalam Paris	**Cut Mini Theo – Athirah**; Laudya Cynthia Bella – Aisyah: Biarkan Kami Bersaudara; Imelda Therinne – The Professionals; Lala Karmela – Bukaan 8; Nirina Zubir – Aku Ingin Ibu Pulang
Best Supporting Actor	Best Supporting Actress
**Agus Kuncoro – Moammar Emka's Jakarta Undercover**; Dion Wiyoko–Cek Toko Sebelah''; Baim Wong – Moammar Emka's Jakarta Undercover; Arie Kriting – Aisyah: Biarkan Kami Bersaudara; Alex Abbad – My Stupid Boss	**Raihaanun – Salawaku**; Chelsea Islan – 3 Srikandi; Lydia Kandou - Aisyah: Biarkan Kami Bersaudara; Ira Maya Sopha – Pinky Promise; Ira Wibowo – Sabtu Bersama Bapak
Best Newcomer Actor/Actress	Best Children Role
**Bisma Karisma – Juara**; Giulio Parengkuan – Pertaruhan; Sheryl Sheinafia – Koala Kumal; Rania Putri Sari – Surat Cinta Untuk Kartini; Dhea Seto – Pinky Promise	**Adriyan Bima – Bangkit!**; Dionisius Rivaldo Moruk – Aisyah: Biarkan Kami Bersaudara; Messi Gusti – Cinta Laki-laki Biasa; Elko Kastanya – Salawaku; Jefan Nathanio – Aku Ingin Ibu Pulang
Best Chemistry	Best Ensemble
**Dian Sastrowardoyo and Nicholas Saputra – Ada Apa dengan Cinta? 2**; Lala Karmela and Chicco Jerikho – Bukaan 8; Velove Vexia and Nino Fernandez – Wa'alaikumussalam Paris; Cut Mini Theo and Irish Bella – Me vs Mami; Nirina Zubir and Teuku Rifnu Wikana – Aku Ingin Ibu Pulang	**Falcon Pictures – My Stupid Boss**; MP Pro – Pinky Promise; IFI Sinema – Pertaruhan; Demi Istri Production – Moammar Emka's Jakarta Undercover; Grafent Pictures – Moammar Emka's Jakarta Undercover; PT. Kharisma Starvision Plus – Cek Toko Sebelah

=== Favourite ===
Winners are listed first and highlighted in boldface.

Favourite Actor	Favourite Actress	
**Reza Rahadian – My Stupid Boss**; Abimana Aryasatya – Warkop DKI Reborn: Jangkrik Boss! Part 1; Teuku Rifnu Wikana – Aku Ingin Ibu Pulang; Chicco Jerikho – Surat Cinta Untuk Kartini; Nino Fernandez – Wa'alaikumussalam Paris	**Laudya Cynthia Bella – Aisyah: Biarkan Kami Bersaudara**; Cut Mini Theo – Athirah; Imelda Therinne – The Professionals; Lala Karmela – Bukaan 8; Nirina Zubir –	Aku Ingin Ibu Pulang
Favourite Supporting Actor	Favourite Supporting Actress	
**Dion Wiyoko – Cek Toko Sebelah**; Baim Wong – Moammar Emka's Jakarta Undercover; Agus Kuncoro – Moammar Emka's Jakarta Undercover; Arie Kriting – Aisyah: Biarkan Kami Bersaudara; Alex Abbad – My Stupid Boss	**Chelsea Islan – 3 Srikandi**; Lydia Kandou – Aisyah: Biarkan Kami Bersaudara; Ira Maya Sopha – Pinky Promise; Raihaanun – Salawaku; Ira Wibowo – Sabtu Bersama Bapak	
Favourite Newcomer Actor/Actress	Favourite Film	
**Bisma Karisma – Juara**; Giulio Parengkuan – Pertaruhan; Sheryl Sheinafia – Koala Kumal; Rania Putri Sari – Surat Cinta Untuk Kartini; Dhea Seto – Pinky Promise	**Cek Toko Sebelah – PT. Kharisma Starvision Plus**; My Stupid Boss – Falcon Pictures; Warkop DKI Reborn: Jangkrik Boss! Part 1 – Falcon Pictures; Koala Kumal – PT. Kharisma Starvision Plus; Pinky Promise – MP Pro; Sabtu Bersama Bapak – Maxima Pictures; Ada Cinta di SMA – PT. Kharisma Starvision Plus; Athirah – Miles Films; Ada Apa dengan Cinta? 2 – Miles Films; Aisyah: Biarkan Kami Bersaudara – Film One Production	

=== Lifetime Achievement ===
The Lifetime Achievement award is given to the person who is considered the most dedicated to the world of Indonesian cinema that year. This year the award was given to a senior actress, Christine Hakim, for her dedication and totality in the Indonesian film industry.

== See also ==
- Festival Film Indonesia 2017
- Festival Film Bandung 2017
- Indonesian Box Office Movie Awards 2017
- Usmar Ismail Awards 2017
