= Maya Award for Best Actor in a Leading Role =

Annual Indonesian film award

- Awarded for: Best Actor in a Leading Role of the Year
- Country: Indonesia
- First award: 2012
- Currently held by: Reza Rahadian; My Stupid Boss (2016)
- Website: pialamaya.com

The Maya Award for Best Actor in a Leading Role is one of the Maya Awards presented annually since the awards debuted in 2012, that is initiated by FILM_Indonesia Twitter account.

The nominations and winners of the awards are selected by a panel of judges consisting of Indonesian film critics and filmmakers, including directors, actors, and actresses.

== Winners and nominees ==
indicates the winner

=== 2010s ===
Year	Actor	Film
2012	Donny Damara *	Lovely Man
2012	Nicholas Saputra	Postcards from the Zoo
2012	Reza Rahadian	Test Pack
2012	Roy Marten	Dilema
2012	Tio Pakusadewo	Rayya, Cahaya di Atas Cahaya
2013	Reza Rahadian *	Habibie & Ainun
2013	Abimana Aryasatya	Belenggu
2013	Ikranagara	Sang Kiai
2013	Joe Taslim	La Tahzan
2013	Vino G. Bastian	Rumah dan Musim Hujan
2014	Chicco Jerikho *	Cahaya Dari Timur: Beta Maluku
2014	Vino G. Bastian	3 Nafas Likas
2014	Ario Bayu	Soekarno: Indonesia Merdeka
2014	Alfie Affandy	Hijrah Cinta
2014	Herjunot Ali	Tenggelamnya Kapal Van Der Wijck
2015	Deddy Sutomo *	Mencari Hilal
2015	Chico Jerikho	Filosofi Kopi
2015	Reza Rahadian	Guru Bangsa: Tjokroaminoto
2015	Vino G. Bastian	Toba Dreams
2015	Rio Dewanto	Love and Faith
2016	Reza Rahadian *	My Stupid Boss
2016	Abimana Aryasatya	Warkop DKI Reborn: Jangkrik Boss Part 1
2016	Chico Jerikho	A Copy of My Mind
2016	Tio Pakusadewo	Surat Dari Praha
2016	Vino G. Bastian	Warkop DKI Reborn: Jangkrik Boss Part 1

== Multiple wins and nominations ==
The following individuals have received Best Actor in a Leading Role awards:

Wins	Actor
2	Reza Rahadian
1	Donny Damara
1	Deddy Sutomo
1	Chico Jerikho

The following individuals have received multiple Best Actor in a Leading Role nominations:

Nominations	Actor
4	Reza Rahadian
4	Vino G. Bastian
3	Chico Jerikho
2	Abimana Aryasatya
2	Tio Pakusadewo
