= Maya Award for Best Actress in a Supporting Role =

Annual Indonesian film award

- Awarded for: Best Actress in a Supporting Role of the Year
- Country: Indonesia
- First award: 2012
- Currently held by: Chelsea Islan; 3 Srikandi (2016)
- Website: pialamaya.com

The Maya Award for Best Actress in a Supporting Role is one of the Maya Awards presented annually since the awards debuted in 2012, that is initiated by FILM_Indonesia Twitter account.

The nominations and winners of the awards are selected by a panel of judges consisting of Indonesian film critics and filmmakers, including directors, actors, and actresses.

== Winners and nominees ==
indicates the winner

=== 2010s ===
Year	Actress	Film
2012	Adinia Wirasti *	Arisan! 2
2012	Aida Nurmala	Arisan! 2
2012	Meriam Bellina	Test Pack
2012	Christine Hakim	Rayya, Cahaya di Atas Cahaya
2012	Wulan Guritno	Dilema
2013	Ayushita *	What They Don't Talk About When They Talk About Love
2013	Christine Hakim	Sang Kiai
2013	Dewi Irawan	9 Summers 10 Autumn
2013	Imelda Therinne	Belenggu
2013	Jajang C. Noer	Rumah dan Musim Hujan
2014	Meriam Bellina *	Slank Nggak Ada Matinya
2014	Jajang C. Noer	3 Nafas Likas
2014	Tika Bravani	Soekarno: Indonesia Merdeka
2014	Laura Basuki	Haji Backpacker
2014	Karina Nadila Niab	Aku, Kau & KUA
2015	Ria Irawan *	Bulan Diatas Kuburan
2015	Atiqah Hasiholan	2014
2015	Christine Hakim	Pendekar Tongkat Emas
2015	Jajang C. Noer	Toba Dreams
2015	Prisia Nasution	Comic 8: Casino Kings Part 1
2016	Chelsea Islan *	3 Srikandi
2016	Acha Septriasa	Shy Shy Cat
2016	Adinia Wirasti	Ada Apa Dengan Cinta? 2
2016	Titiek Puspa	Ini Kisah Tiga Dara
2016	Widyawati	Surat Dari Praha

== Multiple wins and nominations ==
The following individuals have received Best Actress in a Supporting Role awards:

Wins	Actress
1	Adinia Wirasti
1	Ayushita
1	Chelsea Islan
1	Meriam Bellina
1	Ria Irawan

The following individuals have received multiple Best Actress in a Supporting Role nominations:

Nominations	Actress
3	Christine Hakim
3	Jajang C. Noer
2	Meriam Bellina
2	Adinia Wirasti
