= Purwaniatun =

Indonesian actress

- Born: 31 December 1952; Surakarta, Indonesia
- Died: 23 March 2020 (aged 67); South Jakarta, Indonesia
- Occupation: Actress
- Years active: 2005–2019
- Spouse: Iskandar

Purnawiatun (31 December 1952 – 23 March 2020) was an Indonesian actress known for starring as a housekeeper in soap operas.

== Biography ==
Purnawiatun was born on 31 December 1952 in Surakarta. She began acting in 2004, when she began appearing in the television series Gerhana and Kawin Gantung. She later appeared in the television series Hidayah, Legenda, Asisten Rumah Tangga, and Asisten Rumah Tangga 2, as well as the 2014 horror film Sarang Hantu Jakarta, the 2017 television film Kisah Nyata Ramanda: Anak Konglomerat Jadi Pembantu, and the 2019 miniseries Monyet Cantik dan Serigala Ganteng.

Despite having a limited presence in the main cast, Purwaniatun became well known for portraying housekeeper characters, including in soap operas, with Irsandy Dwi of Brilio saying that she was "known to be reliable every time she played the role of a household assistant". She subsequently acquired the nickname Simbok.

Purwaniatun was married to Iskandar, whom she recalled was her driver, manager, and personal assistant, and she had four children. It was also reported that her Dara Manisku co-star Revalina S. Temat recalled her as "a very simple and straightforward [but] very firm person".

In 2019, Purwaniatun was diagnosed with uterine cancer and underwent surgery to remove the tumors in February 2020. However, she remained hospitalized and, on 23 March 2020, died of the disease in Mayapada Hospital in Lebak Bulus, South Jakarta; she was 66. She was subsequently arranged for a burial at Pondok Kelapa Public Cemetery in Duren Sawit, East Jakarta.
