= Tetangga Masa Gitu? =

- Genre: Sitcom; Comedy; Slice of life
- Starring: Dwi Sasono; Sophia Latjuba; Deva Mahenra; Chelsea Islan
- Opening theme: Soulful - "Semua Indah"
- Ending theme: Maya Septha featuring Boy William - "So Falling in Love"
- Country of origin: Indonesia
- Original language: Indonesian
- No. of seasons: 3
- No. of episodes: 593

Production
- Producer: Yenni Pujiastuti
- Production locations: Jakarta, Indonesia
- Running time: 30 minutes
- Production companies: Imagine Films and NET. Entertainment

Original release
- Network: NET.
- Release: March 20, 2014 – January 29, 2017

Tetangga Masa Gitu? (often abbreviated to TMG; English: What An Annoying Neighbour!) is a sitcom that follows the daily lives of two couples. The first couple, Adi and Angela, has been married for ten years, and the second couple, Bastian and Bintang, is newly married. This sitcoms compares the long- and newly married couples with their daily problems that they face. They live in the same block and are neighbors. The series premiered on March 20, 2014 on NET, and since July 25, 2024, on Netflix.

== Cast ==
=== Main ===
- Dwi Sasono as Adi Putranto —Adi is Angel's husband. He has been married to Angel for ten years. He only has two friends, Bastian, his neighbor, and Mamat, a primary school student. He used to teach art in Matahari High School, but now he works at Mamat's Primary School. He is a couch potato, and his only entertainment is to annoy his neighbors. He often eats breakfast in Bastian and Bintang's house because Angel never makes him breakfast except for havermout. He likes to eat instant noodles, which he calls 'Milam' (Mie Malam-Malam) (English : Midnight Noodles) and plays PlayStation at the rental place with his friend, Mamat. He collects keris and other antiques.
- Sophia Latjuba as Angela Schweinsteiger —Angel is Adi's wife. She has been married to Adi for ten years. Her mother is Indonesian, but her father is German. She is a lawyer graduated from University of Indonesia. Despite her high income, Angel is known for her penny-pincher personality, especially to Adi. She always asks for something from her neighbors, Bastian and Bintang. She often practices pilates and yoga. She is a little bit over protective to Adi, and she always tries to force Adi to change his lifestyle. She likes to make havermout for Adi's breakfast, but Adi never eats it.
- Deva Mahenra as Bastian Irawan —Bastian is Bintang's husband. He used to work as a detergent salesman, but now he works as an event organizer in a toy store. Even though he is not as smart as his wife, Bintang, he is very romantic. He often gives Bintang roses and does romantic stuff to Bintang. He likes to read comics and acts like a comic book character. He also collects action figures.
- Chelsea Islan as Bintang Howard Bornstein —Bintang is Bastian's wife. Her mother is Indonesian, but her father is American. She is beautiful. Her IQ is 186, and she graduated from Harvard University. Her nickname is "Walking Wikipedia" because she is very smart. She opens an online shop. Bintang always says a very long "So Sweet" when Bastian does something romantic. When Bastian didn't obey her wishes, she started crying like a poodle. She likes to cook even though she's actually bad at it, and Bastian never tells her about it.

==== Special appearances ====
- Poppy Sovia as Kara: Adi's ex-lover
- Reza Rahadian as Ruly Ernando: Angel's ex-lover
- Tarzan Srimulat as Pak RT
- Herry Ujang as Ucup
- Denny Sumargo as Charles
- Jajang C. Noer as Adi's mother
- Ferry Salim as Professor Hartono
- Restu Sinaga as Bayu
- Dion Wiyoko as Freddy Lunggana
- Shania Junianatha as Tania
- Alexa Key as Hilda
- Gandhi Fernando as Gandhi
- Edi Brokoli as School Headmaster
- Joshua Pandelaki as Profesor Doktor Kakulus
- Gading Marten as Boy
- Karel Susanteo as Akbar Sudarso
- Abdurrahman Arif as Akbar's father
- Tike Priatnakusumah as Bastian's mother
- Soraya Haque as Bintang's mother
- Manuella Villareal as son of Angel's cousin
- Olga Lydia as Angel's friend
- Chelsy Liven as Fiona
- Nina Zatulini as Stella
- Griff Pradapa as Mamat
- Rahma Landy as Malaika Chaniago
- Armand Maulana as Himself
- Maria Sabta as Nadyas
- Ariel Noah as Panda
- Cantika Felder as Gadis
- Minati Atmanegara as Gadis' mother
- Rio Dewanto as Aryo Pamungkas
- Brandon Salim as Bobby Ricky
- Boy William as Reza
- Ganindra Bimo as Niko
- Andrea Dian as Nina

== Production ==
Tetangga Masa Gitu had its last filming day on 17 January 2017.

== Episode ==
=== Season 1 ===
- 1. Rumah Baru dan Meja Pimpong / New House & Ping Pong Table

Bastian & Bintang have moved to their new house with their new neighbors Adi & Angel, and Bastian plans to have a ping pong table.

- 2. Cincin Kawin / Wedding Ring

Angel is jealous because of Bintang's ring and their proposal is better than hers was.

- 3. Rayuan Pulau Kelapa / Coconut Island Appeal

Bastian sings and begs to Bintang to get what he wants. This works, so Adi tries to do the same to Angel.

- 4. Microwave

It is Bintang's birthday, and Bastian wants to keep it a surprise.

- 5. Maradona dari Gunung Kidul / Maradona from Kidul Mountains

Angel will remove every item in Adi's soccer collection if Adi doesn't know soccer. Meanwhile, Bastian hates matching clothes, but Bintang likes them.

- 6. Kenangan Borobudur / A Bad Memory In Borobudur

Fourteen years ago, Angel ripped her pants in public at Candi Borobudur. The public (and Adi) laughed at her, making her angry with Adi and breaking up with him. Fortunately, Adi apologized to Angel, and Angel accepted it if he promised to not tell anyone. Now, he breaks his promise by telling the story to Bastian and then Bintang.

- 7. Cemburu / Jealousy

Adi is jealous of Angel's student, who is younger and more handsome than he.

- 8. Kondangan Rempong / A Complicated Wedding Reception

Adi and Angel are preparing to go to a friend's wedding. Meanwhile, Bintang wants to sleep but is disturbed by Adi, Angel, and Bastian.

- 9. Bastian Ulang Tahun / Bastian's Birthday

It is Bastian's birthday, but Adi does not give Bastian a present, making him think that he hates Bastian. So Adi gives him a watch but accidentally gives him a 3 million Rp watch rather than a 50 Rp watch.

- 10. Mertua Angel Datang / Angel's Mother-in-Law is Coming

Angel hates Adi's mother because she always complains to her. Adi's whole family hates her.

- 11. Gagal Ke Puncak / Failed To Go To Puncak

Adi, Angel, Bastian, and Bintang plan to visit Puncak to go camping, but something always goes wrong.

- 12. Berlomba dalam Kuis / Competing On Quiz

After Bintang ruins Bastian's favorite quiz show (Because She is super smart), he and Adi challenge Bintang and Angel for a quiz, which they lose.

- 13. Bisnis Online / Online Business

Bintang starts her own online business.

- 14. Suami-Suami Jatuh Sakit / The Husbands Are Sick

Bastian and Adi are sick, and Angel has to work, so she gets Bintang in charge.

- 15. Ulang Tahun yang Terlupakan / Birthday That Got Forgotten

It is Angel's birthday, but Adi doesn't know about it.

- 16. Tongsis / Selfie Stick

Bintang decides to retire from her online business. Meanwhile, Adi is obsessed with online shopping.

- 17. Adi Kabur dari Rumah / Adi Ran Out From Home

After Angel accidentally uses Adi's favorite shirt as a wiping cloth, he runs out of the house and stays at Bastian and Bintang's house. Bastian is angry because it is his and Bintang's three month anniversary.

- 18. Hut NET. Ke-1 / NET. 1st Birthday

Bastian wins four tickets to the NET. Birthday Concert and gives them to his neighbor and his wife.

- 19. Adi Rai

Bastian helps Adi to be healthy and strong by building a DIY gym in his house, but in the end it is all about boys v. girls (see Episode 12).

- 20. Fogging

Bintang is scared of mosquitoes because of a tragic illness that happened when she was a child.

- 21. Adi Cidera, Bastian Menderita / Adi is Hurt, Bastian is Suffering

Adi hurts his knee, so Angel wants Bastian to take care of him.

- 22. Me Time

Bintang wants some time alone but is always disturbed by Bastian, Adi, and Angel.

- 23. Musim Kawin / Wedding Season

Bintang doesn't want to go to Bastian's friend's wedding because the friend is her ex. Meanwhile, Adi doesn't want to go to Angel's friend's wedding at Surabaya unless he is sick.

- 24. Truth or Dare

Adi and Angel are bored, so they play with Bastian and Bintang. But they play too much and make Bastian and Bintang tire of them.

- 25. Adi Sakit Gigi / Adi has Toothache

After eating too much ice cream, Adi has a toothache. Meanwhile, Bastian buys a karaoke machine.

- 26. Dead Water

Adi and Angel's water system breaks, so they borrow water from Bastian and Bintang.

- 27. Frozen

Angel wants a new fridge, but Adi doesn't have the money. So he borrows Bintang and Bastian's fridge.

- 28. Vacuum Cleaner

Angel wants a new vacuum cleaner. Bintang hates her new vacuum cleaner from her uncle-in-law.

- 29. Match Maker

The gang wants to make Bintang's cousin Fionna with Angel's work friend Freddy.

- 30. Kangen / Longing for Someone

Bintang and Angel leave on a business trip, the first time they leave Bastian and Adi alone.

- 31. Fanatik / Fanatic

Bintang is addicted to the K-drama Full House. Then, Bastian secretly becomes a fanatic. Meanwhile, at school, a student is a fan of Adi.

- 32. Hell on Earth

Adi has a nightmare showing that he will go to hell if he doesn't stop lying, so he always says the truth. Meanwhile, Bastian cannot tell the truth about Bintang's new toy from Surabaya.

- 33. Anger Management

Adi has anger issues at Lebaran, so Angel teaches him meditation.

- 34. Who Dun It

Someone steals Angel's 5m rupiah necklace.

- 35. New Job

Bastian is promoted to a full-time worker, so he never has a lot of time with Bintang. Meanwhile, Angel is mad because Adi is still unemployed. In the end, Angel and Bintang realize that they want their husbands to be near each other rather than away.

- 36. Week End Rasa Week Day / Weekend Feels Like Another Days

Bastian is jealous because a lot of guys like Bintang. Meanwhile, Adit, Adi's friend, stays with Angel and Adi rather than going to Bogor with his mother.

- 37. Lebaran Sebentar Lagi / Lebaran Will Be Coming

Angel and Adi prepare to visit Angel's family for Lebaran. Meanwhile, Bintang is confused with Bastian's whole family.

- 38. SIX Pack vs FAMILY Pack

After Bintang watches a movie and likes men with a 6-pack, Bastian tries to be healthy by eating less. Meanwhile, Angel hates Adi's eating a lot of carbs, making Angel order Adi on a diet of fruits and vegetables. So Adi and Bastian plan to give Bastian's food to Adi.

- 39. Self Security

With too much security debt, Adi and Bastian start a stakeout.

- 40. Interview Simalakama / A Dilemma Interview

Bastian prepares for an interview. Meanwhile, Adi thinks he wants to return to a teaching job.

- 41. Monster Chef

Bastian and Adi learns how to cook to help their wife.

- 42. Komik Bastian yang Hilang / Bastian's Comics Are Gone

Bintang accidentally throws Bastian's comics in the garbage. Meanwhile, Adi thinks Angel threw away his new painting.

- 43. Sang Guru / The Teacher

Angel learns how to paint from Adi.

- 44. 17 Agustus (Spesial HUT Indonesia) / 17 August (Indonesian Independence Special)

Angel made Adi participate in an independence day's competition

- 45. Drama Asisten Rumah Tangga / Maid's Drama

The gang needs a maid, but they don't have enough money for that.

- 46. Curhat Sahabat / The confide of Best Friend

Bintang's friend, Stella, came to Bintang's house because she's heartbroken.

- 47. Tamu dari Jerman / Guest From Germany

Angel's cousin Helga is coming To Jakarta, but Adi doesn't like her because she is twice as evil as Angel. Meanwhile, Bintang makes Padang food, but it is disgusting.

- 48. Bayanganku Bayanganmu / My Shadow, Your Shadow

Angel wants Adi to get a job. Adi wants Angel to be a housewife. Bintang wants Bastian to get a job that he can do from home. Bastian thinks Bintang wants to have her own career.

- 49. Keris Kesayangan / The Beloved Keris

Angel accidentally sells Adi's Keris in Bintang and Bastian's yard sale

- 50. My Dearest Little Sister

Bastian's sister, Tania came to Bastian's house and annoys Bastian. Meanwhile, Adi is trying to avoid the debt collector.

- 51. Mimpi Ketemu Ikan / A Dream Of Meeting A Fish

Adi dreams that if he paints a fish painting, he'll be famous. So he tries every way to paint a fish painting, and annoys the rest of the gang.

- 52. Liburan Bareng Yuk !!! / Lets Go On The Holiday Together !!!

The gang is ready for a holiday to Bali (this episode is sponsored by Wall's Corneto Mini)

=== Season 2 ===
- 53. Twitwar

Bintang thinks that Bastian is cheating on her via Twitter. Meanwhile, Adi makes his own Twitter account to annoy Bastian.

- 54. Ayam Jago

Bintang wants a dog to accompany her while Bastian works. Meanwhile, Adi found a chicken in front of his house.

- 55. Gara-Gara TV

Angel wants a TV in the bedroom, but Adi doesn't want to; they fight for it. Meanwhile, Bastian is in his Batman phase, dressing, talking, and acting like Batman.

- 56. Mysterious Doll

Adi finds a doll in the basement. The gang thinks it is cursed. They became very paranoid after they watch The Conjuring.

- 57. Post Wedding

Angel is jealous because Bastian and Bintang got their pra-wedding album. So, Angel and Adi decided to have their own wedding album.

- 58. Sportif

The entire neighbourhood is having a ping pong competition, so Angel decided to play against Adi and Bintang, but Bintang gets a huge order, making her tired. Meanwhile, Bastian is worried because he doesn't know how to play ping pong.

- 59. Motivator

Angel and Bintang think it's strange that Bastian and Adi are doing household chores.

- 60. Nostalgia di Hari Minggu

Bastian and Bintang planned to go to a zoo weeks ago. Meanwhile, Adi is dying to go to the mall.

- 61. Misteri Surat Cinta

Bastian found a love letter wrote by Bintang. Adi found a love letter that someone wrote for Angel.

- 62. PS4 Gulipat

Adi and Bastian bought a PS4.

- 63. Little Trouble Monster

Bintang signed up to a make-up course. Meanwhile, Angel's nephew, Kamila is staying for the day at Angel's house.

- 64. Keris Masa Gitu
- 65. Made in India
- 66. The Fault in Our Stars

Based on a movie, Bintang dreams that Bastian is dead.

- 67. Inspirasi yang Tertunda
- 68. Bi Yuti
- 69. Cerita di Bioskop
- 70. Gara-Gara Buku
- 71. Pekerjaan Baru
- 72. Tetangga Baru
- 73. Kupon Undian
- 74. Basmeo-Biliet
- 75. Misi Perdamaian
- 76. Konser Rock !!!
- 77. Rahasia Angel
- 78. Harvard Malang
- 79. Japan Here Were Come

Bastian gets a task in Japan, so he brings Bintang to Japan. But she takes it too far.

- 80. Pesta Halloween
- 81 - 82 . New School
- 83. Casting
- 84. Teman Masa Gitu
- 85. Where's My Phone
- 86. Guru Masak Ku
- 87. Behind Bars
- 88. Sang Maestro
- 89. Insomnia
- 90. Asli atau Palsu ?
- 91. Uang Tabungan

Angel has a case box that Adi thinks is full of money.

- 92. Who's The Boss
- 93. Precious Painting
- 94. Hipnotis (Hypnotic)

Scared of enemies, Adi and Angel learn hypnotism.

- 95. Dynamo Man

A black out happens in the neighborhood, and the gang has to find time for night.

- 96. Adi Jadi Dua
- 97. Angel's Big Case
- 98. Woman Bad Habits
- 99. Kursus Adi Bintang
- 100. Lebih Baik Sakit Hati
- 101. Girl's Night Out

Bastian's young sister is here from Bandung, and he is protective of her. Angel needs protection, so she calls Bastian's sister to teach her Thai boxing.

- 102. Connection Lost
- 103. Abrakadabra

Adi and Bastian bet each other on who is better at magic tricks, and the loser must cook the winner meals for a week (except Bintang has to buy the food).

- 104. Boys Will Be Boys
- 105. Hari Jadian
- 106. Almoust Famous
- 107. Waspada Bencana
- 108. Surat yang Tertukar / Switched Letter

Because of the rain and address, their letters have been ruined and switch, making Bintang believe that she graduated from cooking class and making Adi think that Angel will die.

- 109. Tikus

The gang must figure out how to get rid of mice in their houses.

- 110. Lilin Terapi
- 111. Homo Modernicus
- 112. Make Over
- 113. Terjebak Diet
- 114. Biang Rusuh
- 115. Special Natal
- 116. Bintang Times Out
- 117. Where Is It ?
- 118. I Want to be Millionaire
- 119. Tahun Baru
- 120. Panas Lemas
- 121. Go Green
- 122. Baby Sitter
- 123. Gara-Gara Hujan
- 124. Eksperimen Bintang
- 125. Bastian Sekolah Lagi / Back To School For Bastian

Bastian goes back to university to get a higher level.

- 126. BBM Benar-Benar Masalah
- 127. Pameran Lukisan
- 128. Sakit Cacar / Chicken Pox

Angel gets chicken pox, and the gang is worried about contagion.

- 129. TV Addict
- 130. Kena Embargo
- 131. Time is Money
- 132. Cenayang
- 133. Spesial 1st Anniversary Bastian-Bintang
- 134-138. No Amazing Race
- 139-143. Ada Ular di Rumahku / There's a Snake In My House
- 144-147. Gara-Gara Sulis / Because Of Sulis
- 148. Misteri Legging
- 149. Ngamuk di Twitter
- 150. Valentine
- 151-152. Ketagihan Batu
- 153. Sleeping Disorder

Because Bintang says no to Bastian for buying the limited edition of the Tarzan comic, Bastian sleepwalks as Tarzan and ruins Bintang's beauty sleep until Adi and Angel come to record it and upload it to YouTube. Bastian is angry, and Bintang buys him his limited edition.

- 154. Surprise Party Special Imlek
- 155-159. Perang Panas Dingin / Hot & Cold War

Although Its Having 5 Part There The Main Story.

Adi Part: Adi is meeting a new counselor at his school, who does nice things for Adi, making Angel jealous. But after a selfie, the principal fires him and the student and counselor say goodbye forever.

Angel Part: Angel and her enemy are fighting each other, and her enemy says that Angel is cheating (despite needing her friend's laptop). She gets fired but her boss doesn't believe her, so he brings back Angel.

Bastian & Bintang Part : Bastian admits to Bintang that her food is bad, so they have a little chef showdown to find out who is better at cooking.

- 160. Parno to The Max
- 161-163. Cincin Cenat Cenut / Cenat Cenut Ring
- 164-166. Ga Tahan Johan / Can't Stand Johan
- 167-171. After The War

Angel loses a case, losing the company 50 million rupiahs. The boss is angry and fires her, making Adi and Angel sad. Worse, Bastian and Bintang move to Pondok Indah, despite Bintang's father buying her a nice house. Adi wants to bribe Angel's boss to get her job back. He says he will do anything, so the boss says he can get Angel back in the company if he drinks three big bottles of ginger juice (Jahe), making him and the boss drunk in the end. Angel gets her job back, and Bastian and Bintang do not move; in fact, their purpose home is sold to Angel's client enemy.

- 172-174. Cicak vs Komodo / Komodo Vs Lizard
- 175. Tas Mahal Angel (New Fashion)
- 176. Tas Mahal Angel (Istri Bekerja VS Di Rumah)
- 177. Tas Mahal Angel (Aliran PAM Mati)
- 178. Tas Mahal Angel (Bastian Sok Atlet)
- 179. Tas Mahal Angel (Ulah Pak RT)
- 180. Reuni (Ariel)
- 181-183. MLM
- 184. Paket Misterius (My Honey Bunny)
- 185. Paket Misterius (Family Gathering Bagian 1)
- 186. Paket Misterius (Family Gathering Bagian 2)
- 187-189. Second Honeymoon
- 190-194. Istriku Jenius / My Wife Is A Genius
- 195. Semangat Curhat
- 196. English Test Bikin Stres
- 197. Milam / Midnood ( Midnight Noodles )

After Angel prohibits him from ever eating milam again, Adi goes to a local food vendor that sells it. He pays by working there, but he is caught when Angel sees him at the food vendor.

- 198. Pohon Tetangga ( Neighbor Tree )

Angel thinks that Bintang's favorite tree in her garden is a caterpillar factory. When Adi sees Bastian cutting some branches from Bintang's favorite tree, she is mad and convinces Angel to stop cutting the tree because the electric wire will collapse. Angel doesn't believe it but she will not cut it if it is not a caterpillar factory.

- 199. Privacy

The Gang Have Problem With Their Privacy In Their Phone

- 200-201. A Weekend Without You

The girls take a trip to Garut, and the boys must find how they will spend it without them for the weekend.

- 202. Mikir Kalo Parkir
- 203. Terserah Jadi Masalah
- 204. Kulkas
- 205. Story Of Shooting Star
- 206. Gara-Gara Timbangan
- 207. Deman Marathon
- 208. Senam Wajah
- 209. C.O.C.
- 210-211. Hello Horror
- 212. Cuci Kaki
- 213-214. Cinderella

After an argument in which Bastian does not like Adi's painting to give to his boss, Bintang tries to apologize by bringing Angel home, except she forgets, despite the rain. She redeems herself by doing her job when she gets the flu. Meanwhile, Angel will sell Adi keris if he does not get five interviews.

- 215. War Of Colors
- 216. When Everything Changes

=== Special ===
- 217. Cerita Bintang Howard Bornstain (Chelsea Islan) ( Bintang Story With Chelsea )

We Going To Look Deeper About Bintang With Chelsea

- 218. Cerita Bastian Irawan (Deva Mahenra) ( Bastian Story With Deva )

We Going To Look Deeper About Bastian With Deva

- 219. Cerita Angela Schweinsteiger (Sophia Latjuba)( Angela Story With Sophia )

We Going To Look Deeper About Angel With Sophia

- 220. Cerita Adi Putranto (Dwi Sasono) ( Adi Story With Sasono )

We Going To Look Deeper About Adi With Sasono

- 221. Cerita Bersama ( Our Story )

We Going To Look Deeper About The Gang With The Cast

=== Season 3 ===
- 222. Paket Nyasar
- 223. Ditegur Kantor
- 224. Calon Ayah
- 225. Trik Hemat Ala Angel
- 226. Lemari Display
- 227. Alis Mata Angel
- 228. Dendam Dari Masa Lalu
- 229. Pak Guru Tersayang < My Favorite Teacher >

There A Student That Bad Of Adi Learning Their Parents Give Them Food Basket To Up The Grade. Adi Didn't Want To But Angel Don't Care

- 230. Promosi Bastian
- 231. Jujur Dong
- 232. Where's My Ring
- 233. Sampahmu Bukan Sampahku
- 234. Pesta Ultah (OKE)
- 235. Sedia Helm Sebelum Motor
- 236. Spooky Traveler
- 237. Ada Apa Dengan Ucup
- 238. Tangan Adi Sakit
- 239. Candle Light Supper
- 240. Bugar Bikin Segar
- 241. Susahnya Niat Batal
- 242. Menahan Amarah
- 243. Mood On The Wall
- 244. Jujur Enak Tidur
- 245. PayDay
- 246. Blast From The Past
- 247. Malaikat Vs Setan
- 248. Everybody Happy
- 249. Pamer Kebaikan
- 250. Sok Kuat Puasa
- 251. Berbagi Kebaikan
- 252. Sumbangkan Dan Ikhlaskan
- 253. Goodbye Ayay, Hello Momon
- 254. Swadaya Buka Puasa
- 255. Petasan Vs Sakit
- 256. Puasa Jangan Gosip
- 257. THR (Tak Harus Resah)
- 258. My Name Is Not Adi
- 259. Pacaran Lagi
- 260. Mudik Impian
- 261. Spesial Idul Fitri
- 262. Kartu Kredit Bikin Melilit
- 263. Critics No More
- 264. KDRT Jadi Masalah RT
- 265. Old Bas, New Bas
- 266. Kacau Tanpa Bintang
- 267. Tukar Mobil, Tukar Sepatu
- 268. Lupa Lupa Ingat
- 269. Cinta Tapi Jauh
- 270. Order Tapi Maksa
- 271. Not A Superwoman
- 272. Style Stealer
- 273. Kembalinya kamila
- 274. Jangan Kurangi Cinta Dan Uang Belanja
- 275. Titip Burung, Titip Masalah
- 276. The Coffee Story
- 277. Salon Yakuza
- 278. Mancing Keributan
- 279. Boot
- 280. Si Jago Masak
- 281. Shoe Business
- 283. Pijat Refleksi
- 284. Romansa Masa Lalu
- 285. To Do List
- 286. Nightmare di Rumah Adi
- 287. Basket & Pride
- 288. Fixed It
- 289. Hot, Spicy & Macho
- 290. Dipaksa Bebas
- 291. Tania Ingin Jadi Girlband
- 292. Inframe
- 293. Pilihlah aku Jadi RTmu
- 294. Last Wish
- 295. Pembenaran vs Kebenaran
- 296. Over The Seas
- 297. Sekutu Buat Adi
- 298. Mendekatkan yang jauh, Menjauhkan yang dekat
- 299. Gowes Sepeda
- 300. Ondel-Ondel
- 310. Mom Vs Daughter

Bastian Is In The Middle Of Fight Between His Sister Tania ( Shania Junianatha From JKT48 ) And His Mother About Tania Trip To Do Hiking In Mount Everest

- 311. Single Unhappy
- 312. Panas Luar Dalam
- 385. Helper

Tania ( Shania Junianatha From JKT48 ) Wants To Build Her Own Online Business Much Off Bastian Concern Meanwhile Adi Enough Of Angel Stopwatch System So He Proved Angel That He Can Be On Time Without Stopwatch System.

- 339. Salah Order ( Wrong Order )

Angel Boss Order Angel To Order A Cake For His Daughter Birthday, Because The Bakery Is Near Adi School Angel Wants Adi To Order The Cake But It Get Wrong, Instead Of Frozen Theme The Cake Is Barbie Theme.

- 403 Susah Tidur ( Hard To Sleep )

Adi Have Problem To Sleep Meanwhile The Rest Of The Neighborhood Is Searching For Their Neighbor Daughter Cat.

- 465. Demam JKT48 ( JKT48 Fever )

Bastian Is In A Pickle When Tania ( Shania Junianatha From JKT48 ) Bastian Sister Is Threatening His Brother To Spill His Secret About His Love For JKT48 To Bintang Meanwhile Adi Learn How To Be Independence For The First Time Since Angel Went To Business Trip ( Special Guest Star : Melody Nurramdhani Laksani, Nabilah Ratna Ayu Azalia & Jessica Veranda Tanumihardja Of JKT48 )

== Accolades ==
Award	Year	Category	Recipients	Result	Ref.
Asian Television Awards	2014	Best Comedy Programme	Tetangga Masa Gitu	Nominated	
Asian Television Awards	2015	Best Comedy Programme	Tetangga Masa Gitu?	Nominated	
Anugerah Komisi Penyiaran Indonesia	2015	Best Drama Program	"Basket and Pride"	Nominated	
