= May the Devil Take You =

2018 horror film by Timo Tjahjanto

- Theatrical release poster
- Indonesian: Sebelum Iblis Menjemput
- Directed by: Timo Tjahjanto
- Screenplay by: Timo Tjahjanto
- Produced by: Sukdev Singh; Wicky V. Olindo; Abimana Aryasatya
- Starring: Chelsea Islan; Pevita Pearce; Samo Rafael; Karina Suwandi; Ray Sahetapy; Ruth Marini; Hadijah Shahab
- Cinematography: Batara Goempar
- Edited by: Teguh Raharjo
- Music by: Fajar Yuskemal
- Production companies: PKDN Lionsgate; Sky Media; Legacy Pictures; iDeate Media
- Distributed by: Netflix
- Release date: 9 August 2018
- Running time: 111 minutes
- Country: Indonesia
- Language: Indonesian
- Box office: $2.9 million

May the Devil Take You (Indonesian: Sebelum Iblis Menjemput) is a 2018 Indonesian horror film written and directed by Timo Tjahjanto. The story follows Alfie (Chelsea Islan) who, when trying to find answers to her father's (Ray Sahetapy) mysterious illness, visits his old house and finds out events from his past.

The film was internationally released by Netflix on 9 August 2018 and premiered at the 75th Venice International Film Festival on 3 September 2018. A sequel, May the Devil Take You Too, was released in 2020.

== Plot ==
Lesmana Wijaya forms a contract with a priestess, who performs black magic to grant him wealth. Flashes of news clippings show his rise to fame, his first wife's suicide, his marriage to retired actress Laksmi, and his imminent bankruptcy.

Alfie, Lesmana's estranged daughter with his first wife, is informed that Lesmana has been hospitalized due to a mysterious illness that leaves him in a coma. At the hospital, she meets her step-siblings Ruben, Maya, and Nara, as well as Ruben's girlfriend Lilly. She is stalked by the priestess, who controls Lesmana to attack her and Lilly in a hallucination. Alfie learns that Laksmi is searching the abandoned family villa for valuables.

Alfie travels to the villa, her childhood home, now abandoned in a secluded area. At Laksmi's demand, Ruben uncovers a sealed door to the cellar. This unleashes a supernatural presence that kills Lesmana in his hospital bed and possesses Laksmi, who then attacks Maya. As their vehicles are sabotaged, Ruben calls for help, while Alfie walks Maya to the village. A delirious Maya flees into the forest, and gets attacked by the possessed Laksmi. Maya kills Laksmi, only to be possessed herself.

Meanwhile Alfie and Ruben discover Lesmana gained his wealth by dealing with dark priestesses, who possess supernatural powers by declaring themselves concubines of the devil. Alfie also recalls the moment of her mother's death, realizing that it was due to the demonic pact and not suicide. The presence also continues to torment Alfie, Ruben, and Nara. Alfie notices strange marks on Nara's body and hers and realizes they are marked for death. The next day, Lily arrives in her car, only to be brutally killed by Maya.

Maya returns to the villa and enters the cellar, seeing a set of dolls representing her family, made of their hair. The presence invites her to become a follower. Maya agrees, influenced by the priestess. Fully under its sway, Maya confronts her siblings. She tempts with Ruben to join her and sacrifice Alfie and Nara. He refuses, prompting her to murder him by dismembering a doll made of his hair.

Alfie experiences a vision of her father betraying the priestess when she demanded Alfie as the next payment. He killed the priestess and buried her under the cellar floor, but not before she cursed his entire bloodline.

Alfie tries to bargain with the priestess for Maya's release. The priestess mocks her, before using the doll to torture her. Alfie then takes Maya's hair doll and burns it, setting Maya on fire. Alfie then digs up the priestess' corpse, cuts out Lesmana's hair that she swallowed for the ritual. She burns the hair, which ends the curse and makes the mark on her arm vanishe.

The priestess manifests, drags Alfie into a pit quickly filling with mud, and wraps her with hair. Alfie cuts herself free but is unable to climb out of the pit. Just as she has given up, Alfie hears her mother's voice and sees her hand. She grabs it to climb out of the pit, discovering that the hand actually belongs to Nara. Now free, the pair escape the villa. Back in the home, the camera pans over the villa's interior and shows the dark doorway of the cellar.

== Cast ==
- Chelsea Islan as Alfie Wijaya: Lesmana and Intan's daughter, Laksmi's step-daughter, Maya and Ruben's step-sister, Nara's half-sister.
  - Nicole Rossi as young Alfie
- Pevita Pearce as Maya Wijaya: Laksmi's daughter, Alfie's step-sister, Ruben's elder sister, Nara's half-sister.
- Karina Suwandi as Laksmi Surya: Alfie's step-mother, Lesmana's second wife, Maya, Ruben and Nara's mother, a retired actress.
- Ray Sahetapy as Lesmana Wijaya: Alfie and Nara's father, Intan and Laksmi's husband, Maya and Ruben's step-father, an entrepreneur
- Samo Rafael as Ruben Wijaya: Alfie's step-brother, Laksmi's son, Maya's brother, Nara's half-brother.
- Ruth Marini as The Priestess
  - Daniel Ekapurta as Berserker Priestess
- Hadijah Shahab as Nara Wijaya: Alfie, Maya and Ruben's half-sister, Laksmi and Lesmana's daughter.
- Clara Bernadeth as Lily, Ruben's girlfriend.
- Kinaryosih as Intan Wijaya: Alfie's mother and Lesmana's first wife who was killed by the Devil.
- Abimana Aryasatya as the voice of the Devil

== Release ==
It was released straight to streaming on August 9, 2018 on Netflix.

=== Critical reception ===
On Rotten Tomatoes, the film received a 77% positive aggregate rating, based on 14 reviews.

== Sequels ==
=== May the Devil Take You: Chapter Two ===
A sequel entitled May the Devil Take You Too was released theatrically in Indonesia on February 27, 2020, and was followed up with a digital release on Disney+ Hotstar. It was later given an American release through Shudder.

=== May the Devil Take You: Chapter Three ===
Timo Tjahjanto has announced that May the Devil Take You: Chapter Three is in development, adding that he has already thought about what characters he can dig deeper into and explore more further.
