= Chelsea Islan =

Indonesian actress, model, and activist

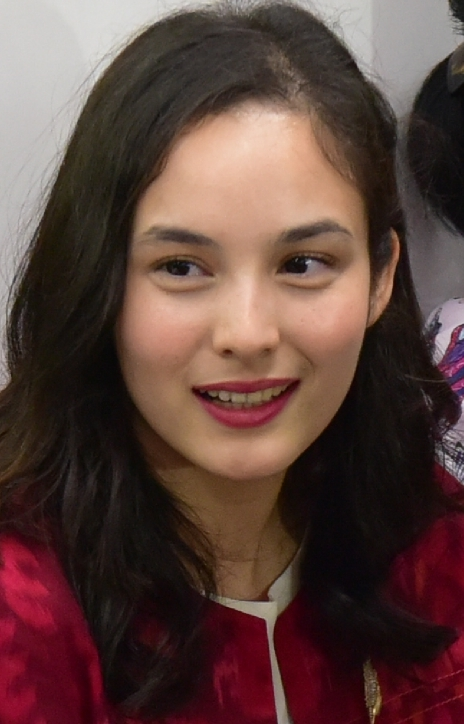
- Islan in 2019
- Born: Chelsea Elizabeth Islan; 2 June 1995 (age 30); Queens, New York City, U.S.
- Occupations: Actress; Model
- Years active: 2005–present
- Notable work: Di Balik 98; Rudy Habibie; A Copy of My Mind; May the Devil Take You; May the Devil Take You Too
- Height: 167 cm (5 ft 6 in)
- Spouse: Rob Clinton Kardinal (m. 2022)
- Parent: Samantha Barbara (mother)
- Relatives: Robert Joppy Kardinal (father-in-law)
- Website: chelseaisdreamy

Chelsea Elizabeth Islan (born 2 June 1995) is an American-born Indonesian actress. She has received two consecutive Citra Award nominations in the Best Actress category for Di Balik 98 (2015) and Rudy Habibie (2016).

Islan rose to fame for her role in the popular sitcom Tetangga Masa Gitu which aired from 2014 to 2017 alongside Sophia Latjuba, Deva Mahenra, and Dwi Sasono. She won four consecutive Indonesian Choice Awards for Actress of the Year from 2015 until 2018, the last year the award show was held.

== Early life ==
Chelsea Islan was born in Queens, New York City, She is the only child in her family to an Indonesian mother and an American father, Islan moved to Jakarta to start elementary school and stay until she finished high school at the Mentari Intercultural School. As an elementary student, she appeared in a stage play of Once on This Island.

== Career ==
She made her feature film debut in the 2013 drama film Refrain alongside Afgansyah Reza and Maudy Ayunda before achieving mainstream success with the action film Street Society and the biographical film Merry Riana: Mimpi Sejuta Dolar as well as the sitcom Tetangga Masa Gitu in 2014.

Before this, in 2005, she starred in a Wall's ice cream commercial.

She appeared opposite Boy William in the historical drama Di Balik 98 in 2015 and another biographical drama Rudy Habibie in 2016. Both roles garnered Islan consecutive nominations at the 2015 and 2016 Citra Awards in the Best Actress category, which she lost to Tara Basro (A Copy of My Mind) and Cut Mini (Athirah) respectively.

For her role in the 2016 biopic film 3 Srikandi, Islan won the 2016 Maya Award for Best Supporting Actress, the 2017 Indonesian Movie Award for Favorite Supporting Actress, as well as a Best Actress Award at the 2016 Bandung Film Festival. Also in 2016, she appeared as a doctor in the Mo Brothers' action film Headshot.

She was cast in the lead role of Alfie for Timo Tjahjanto's solo directorial debut May the Devil Take You, which was released in 2018 to critical and commercial success. She reprised the role in the 2020 sequel May the Devil Take You Too and is set to appear in the third installment May the Devil Take You: Dajjal.

Islan has appeared in multiple commercials for brands such as L'Oreal, Garnier, Tokopedia, Pizza Hut, Oppo, Magnum, Rexona, and Matahari Department Store.

== Personal life ==
Islan established 'Youth of Indonesia', a youth community dedicated to be a platform to contribute to Indonesia and protect the values of pluralism, on the 88th anniversary of the 1928 Youth Pledge on 28 October 2016. She also serves as president of the community. She was named an Innovative Young Leader at the 2017 Southeast Asian Leaders Summit in Jakarta. Islan married Indonesian politician Rob Clinton Kardinal in Jakarta Cathedral, on 8 December 2022.

== Filmography ==
=== Film ===
Year	Title	Role	Ref.
2013	Refrain	Annalise	
2014	Street Society	Karina	
2014	Merry Riana: Mimpi Sejuta Dolar	Merry Riana	
2015	Di Balik 98	Diana	
2015	Guru Bangsa: Tjokroaminoto	Stella	
2015	Love You... Love You Not	Amira	
2016	3 Srikandi	Lilies Handayani	
2016	Headshot	Dr. Ailin	
2016	Pinky Promise	Chelsea	
2016	Rudy Habibie	Illona Ianovska	
2017	Ayat-Ayat Cinta 2	Keira	
2018	May the Devil Take You	Alfie Wijiya	
2020	May the Devil Take You Too	Alfie Wijiya	
2024	Godam & Tira	Susie / Tira	
TBA	May the Devil Take You: Dajjal	Alfie Wijiya	
TBA	Patriot	Susie / Tira	

=== Television ===
Year	Title	Role	Network	Ref.
2014–2017	Tetangga Masa Gitu	Bintang Howard Bornstein	NET TV	
2016	When You Wish upon Sakura	Elly	WakuWaku Japan	

=== Music video ===
Year	Title	Artist	Refs.
2013	''Tak Lagi Sama''	Noah	

== Awards and nominations ==
Year	Award	Category	Work	Result	
2014	3rd Maya Awards	Best Actress in a Leading Role	Street Society	Nominated	
2015	2nd Indonesian Choice Awards	Actress of the Year	Herself	Won	
2015	9th Indonesian Movie Awards	Best Actress	Merry Riana: Mimpi Sejuta Dolar	Nominated	
2015	9th Indonesian Movie Awards	Best Chemistry	Merry Riana: Mimpi Sejuta Dolar	Nominated	shared with Dion Wiyoko
2015	9th Indonesian Movie Awards	Favorite Actress	Merry Riana: Mimpi Sejuta Dolar	Nominated	
2015	35th Citra Awards	Best Actress	Di Balik 98	Nominated	
2016	3rd Indonesian Choice Awards	Actress of the Year	Herself	Won	
2016	36th Citra Awards	Best Actress	Rudy Habibie	Nominated	
2016	5th Maya Awards	Best Actress in a Supporting Role	3 Srikandi	Won	
2016	Bandung Film Festival	Best Actress	3 Srikandi	Won	
2017	11th Indonesian Movie Awards	Best Supporting Actress	3 Srikandi	Nominated	
2017	11th Indonesian Movie Awards	Favorite Supporting Actress	3 Srikandi	Won	
2017	4th Indonesian Choice Awards	Actress of the Year	Herself	Won	
2017	4th Indonesian Choice Awards	Creative and Innovative Person of the Year	Herself	Nominated	
2018	5th Indonesian Choice Awards	Actress of the Year	Herself	Won	

== Magazine and tabloids ==
- Tabloid Wanita Indonesia March 2016, August 2016
- Majalah Femina 13–19 August 2016 (with Bunga Citra Lestari & Tara Basro)
