= Renata Kusmanto =

Indonesian actress and model

- Born: November 7, 1982 (age 43); Klaten, Central Java, Indonesia
- Occupations: Celebrity, Model

Renata Kusmanto (born 7 November 1982) is a model and actress from Indonesia. She began her career as a model in the video clip of Sejujurnya from Vina Panduwinata in 2006. In 2009, she played the part of Dhea in the Indonesian movie, Nazar. She is the cousin of model and actress Mariana Renata.

== Filmography ==
- Nazar (2009).
- Sampai Ujung Dunia as Annisa (2012).
- Test Pack as Sinta (2012).
- Mama Cake (2012).
- Ketika Tuhan Jatuh Cinta as Lydia (2014).

== Videos ==
- Luluh by Samsons
- Lirih by Ari Lasso
- Karena Kamu cuma Satu by Naif
- Katakanlah by Drive
- Aku Bukan Pilihan Hatimu by Ungu
- Terbakar Cemburu by Padi
- Resiko Orang Cantik Black out
