= May the Devil Take You Too =

- Film poster
- Indonesian: Sebelum Iblis Menjemput Ayat 2
- Directed by: Timo Tjahjanto
- Written by: Timo Tjahjanto
- Produced by: Wicky V. Olindo; Daiwanne Ralie; Chali Sakyan; Sunil Samtani; Patrick Tashadian; Timo Tjahjanto
- Starring: Chelsea Islan; Widika Sidmore; Hadijah Shahab; Baskara Mahendra; Shareefa Daanish
- Cinematography: Gunnar Nimpuno
- Edited by: Teguh Raharjo
- Music by: Rooftop Sound
- Production companies: Frontier Pictures; Legacy Pictures; Rapi Films; Brown Entertainment; Screenplay Films
- Distributed by: Shudder
- Release date: 27 February 2020
- Running time: 110 minutes
- Country: Indonesia
- Language: Indonesian
- Box office: $2.6 million

May the Devil Take You Too (Indonesian: Sebelum Iblis Menjemput Ayat 2, lit. 'Before the Devil Picked up: Verse Two'), also referred to as May the Devil Take You: Chapter Two, is a 2020 horror-fantasy film directed and written by Timo Tjahjanto. The sequel to the 2018 film May the Devil Take You and Tjahjanto has announced plans for a third installment in the series.

== Synopsis ==
Two years have passed since the events in the last film, however Alfie is still experiencing paranormal phenomena. One day she and Nara are kidnapped and taken to an abandoned orphanage by a group of strangers introducing themselves as Leo, Marta, Kristi, Budi, Jenar, and Gadis. The group used to live at the orphanage and continued to even after its closing and the death of the owner's wife. They were abused by the owner, Ayub, who worshipped Moloch, prompting them to burn him alive in the home's cellar. Gadis insisted that his spirit was following and cursing them, however they didn't believe her until a seventh person in their group, Dewi, was killed in a supernatural fashion.

The group demands that Alfie come with them to the cellar and use a black bible to end the curse, aware that her father had used a similar one. Alfie reluctantly participates in the ritual, only for it to have the opposite effect and set Ayub's spirit free. The group is murdered one by one until only Budi, Marta, Leo, Alfie, and Nara remain. Alfie realizes that they were all tricked by Gadis, who had likely experienced Stockholm syndrome as a way of dealing with the abuse. She had faked her death by Ayub and had also killed Dewi. Gadis then kills Marta and Leo. Alfie faces off with Gadis, but is forced to use the black bible to effectively fight her. This has a temporary demonic impact on her body.

Gadis takes advantage of a lull in the fight to give herself over fully to Ayub and Moloch, resurrecting Ayub. He then tries to possess Budi, but is stopped by Alfie, who he then tries to possess. Knowing that she cannot allow him to take over her body, Alfie stabs herself in the heart, killing herself and Ayub. Her life is restored by Moloch, who says that she can only die in a way he sees fit and that suicide is an affront to him, as it is her acting like she owns her own soul. Alfie drives off with Budi and Nara. She knows that the fight is not over, but she now has an additional person on her side as well as the black bible.

== Cast ==
- Chelsea Islan as Alfie Wijaya, Lesmana daughter and Nara's half-sister
- Widika Sidmore as Gadis
  - Montserrat Gizelle as young Gadis
- Hadijah Shahab as Nara Wijiya, Lesmana and Laksmi's daughter and Alfie's half-sister
- Baskara Mahendra as Budi
  - Abirama Putra as young Budi
- Shareefa Daanish as Jenar
  - Khayla Maharanie as young Jenar
- Lutesha as Kristi
  - Cantika Putri Kirana as young Kristi
- Karina Salim as Martha
  - Makayla Rose as young Martha
- Arya Vasco as Leo
  - Zizie Zidane as young Leo
- Aurélie Moeremans as Dewi
  - Marsha Aurelia as young Dewi
- Tri Hariono as Ayub
- Ray Sahetapy as Lesmana Wijiya, Alfie and Nara's late father
- Karina Suwandi as Laksmi Surya, Alfie's late step-mother
- Ruth Marini as the priestess
- Saefullah Mahyudin as Moloch
  - Abimana Aryasatya as Moloch (voice)

== Release ==
May the Devil Take You Too was released theatrically on 27 February 2020, followed by a release onto Disney+ Hotstar, both in Indonesia. It was released straight to video in the United States via Shudder on 29 October 2020.

== Reception ==
May the Devil Take You Too has a rating of 73% on review aggregator Rotten Tomatoes, based on 11 reviews. Bloody Disgusting and Signal Horizon both commented that while the film uses familiar horror tropes, it does so effectively. The outlets both drew comparisons to Sam Raimi's Evil Dead and Signal Horizon noted a comparison to Joko Anwar's The Queen of Black Magic, which the reviewer felt was superior, though noting that Tjahjanto's movie "does have some genuinely revolting moments and more than a few laughs". The Daily Dead also reviewed the film and felt that the movie showed "a clear sense of growth in Tjahjanto’s directorial style between the first May the Devil Take You and its sequel, and while I definitely enjoyed the original film, the follow-up just totally goes balls to the wall with a reckless abandon, and I had a blast with what he does here."

== Sequels ==
Timo Tjahjanto has announced that May the Devil Take You: Chapter Three is in development, adding that he has already thought about what characters he can dig deeper into and explore more further.
