= Halfworlds =

Asian thriller television series

- Genre: Dark fantasy Thriller
- Created by: Collin Chang; Erika North; Garon de Silva; Andrew Chin; Nicholas Gauron
- Written by: Collin Chang; Joko Anwar (season 1)
- Directed by: Joko Anwar (season 1); Ekachai Uekrongtham (season 2); Mikhail Red (season 3)
- Countries of origin: Indonesia; Thailand
- Original languages: English; Indonesian; Thai; Mandarin
- No. of seasons: 2
- No. of episodes: 16

Production
- Production locations: Indonesia, Thailand

Original release
- Network: HBO Asia; RED by HBO
- Release: 29 November 2015 – present

Halfworlds is a dark fantasy thriller television series produced and created by HBO Asia and written by Collin Chang. Set in present-day Southeast Asia, the series reveals an underground society populated by demons from Asian folklore across the region.

The first season of Halfworlds, set in Indonesia and directed by Joko Anwar, premiered on 29 November 2015. A second season, set in Thailand and directed by Ekachai Uekrongtham, premiered on 22 January 2017. A third season was announced in November 2019 to be set in the Philippines and directed by Mikhail Red; production of the third season faced several delays due to the COVID-19 pandemic.

== Cast ==
Season 1

- Salvita Decorte as Sarah
- Arifin Putra as Barata
- Reza Rahadian as Tony
- Ario Bayu as Juragan
- Bront Palarae as Gusti
- Tara Basro as Ros
- Adinia Wirasti as Nadia
- Hannah Al-Rashid as Marni
- Alex Abbad as Gorga
- Aimee Saras as Pinung
- Nathan Hartono as Coki
- Verdi Solaiman as Hasan
- Cornelio Sunny as Bandi
- Puteri Balqis as Tari

Season 2

- Peem Jaiyen as Fyter
- Tia Tavee as Juliet Langstorm
- Emma Emika Grant as Pym
- Myra Molloy as Wish
- Arifin Putra as Barata
- Reza Rahadian as Tony
- David Asavanond as Charlie
- Jake Macapagal as Kaprey
- Charlie Ruedpokanon as Mick
- Jeeja Yanin as Thip
- Nicole Theriault as Warin
- Teresa Daley as Yao

== Episodes ==
=== Season 1 ===
Set in the city of Jakarta, Halfworlds Season 1 lifts the veil on a parallel world of bloodthirsty creatures from Indonesian mythology who have lived amongst humans for centuries. They are known simply as "Demit" and have been carefully concealed by a powerful family of mortals. The arrival of the Gift, a mysterious supernatural event, causes this hidden world to reveal itself. As the day of the Gift draws near, Sarah, a street artist, finds herself caught between the worlds of human and Demit. Once the Demit find out who she really is, and what she must do, the delicate balance between the two worlds will be shaken forever.

The first season of Halfworlds premiered on 29 November 2015.

No. overall	No. in season	Title	Directed by	Written by	Original release date
1	1	"Episode 1"	Joko Anwar	Collin Chang and Joko Anwar	29 November 2015
A street artist finds herself caught between two worlds. Little does she know her life is about to take an unexpected twist.
2	2	"Episode 2"	Joko Anwar	Collin Chang and Joko Anwar	6 December 2015
Sarah is pulled deeper into the Demit world and she can’t shake the feeling of being followed.
3	3	"Episode 3"	Joko Anwar	Collin Chang and Joko Anwar	13 December 2015
After being attacked, Sarah's rescuer reveals himself and warns her to stop drawing the monstrous creatures she dreams of.
4	4	"Episode 4"	Joko Anwar	Collin Chang and Joko Anwar	20 December 2015
A wounded Barata seeks out Sarah for help. Meanwhile, the search for the symbols continue in the Demit world.
5	5	"Episode 5"	Joko Anwar	Collin Chang and Joko Anwar	27 December 2015
The Gift draws closer and the Demit grow frantic. Barata rescues Pinung from an attack but it might be too late.
6	6	"Episode 6"	Joko Anwar	Collin Chang and Joko Anwar	3 January 2016
Sarah finally gets the answers she has been looking for but her relationship with her boyfriend Coki is in trouble.
7	7	"Episode 7"	Joko Anwar	Collin Chang and Joko Anwar	10 January 2016
With The Gift just days away, the Demit world is in chaos. Sarah receives an offer from a stranger that is too good to resist.
8	8	"Episode 8"	Joko Anwar	Collin Chang and Joko Anwar	10 January 2016
Sarah is trapped and her friends search for her. In a twist of events, The Gift is bestowed upon the most unexpected of all.

=== Season 2 ===
In the second season of Halfworlds, a tenacious researcher named Juliet is trying to uncover the secret world of demons known as "Peesaj" that live amongst mortals in the city of Bangkok, Thailand. Armed with research by her late father, she embarks on a quest for an ancient artifact of great power. During her search, her actions draw the attention of the local Thai Peesaj.

The second season of Halfworlds premiered on 22 January 2017.

No. overall	No. in season	Title	Directed by	Written by	Original release date
9	1	"Episode 1"	Ekachai Uekrongtham	Collin Chang	22 January 2017
A tenacious researcher named Juliet goes to Bangkok to continue her late father’s work on a hidden world of demons and gets more than what she bargained for.
10	2	"Episode 2"	Ekachai Uekrongtham	Collin Chang	22 January 2017
As Fyter spends more time with Juliet, he finds it harder to kill her. Tony enters the fight tournament in Soi P to win an exclusive session with the Seer.
11	3	"Episode 3"	Ekachai Uekrongtham	Collin Chang	29 January 2017
Juliet tracks Fyter down and arrives at Soi P after Warin’s attack. In the Citadel, Barata almost gets himself killed, but an old friend comes to his rescue.
12	4	"Episode 4"	Ekachai Uekrongtham	Collin Chang	5 February 2017
An important fight between Tony and Thip will determine who wins a session with the Seer while Barata reveals to Kaprey the reason he has returned to the Citadel.
13	5	"Episode 5"	Ekachai Uekrongtham	Collin Chang	12 February 2017
Thip meets with Wish who reveals the way to the Kris of Amorana. Mick finally catches Pym and Fyter is left with an important decision to make.
14	6	"Episode 6"	Ekachai Uekrongtham	Collin Chang	19 February 2017
Fyter, Mick, Wish and Juliet fight their way into the Citadel to retrieve the Kris. They meet Barata and must decide whether he is a friend or foe.
15	7	"Episode 7"	Ekachai Uekrongtham	Collin Chang	26 February 2017
An unexpected death in the Citadel changes everything.
16	8	"Episode 8"	Ekachai Uekrongtham	Collin Chang	26 February 2017
Fyter brings the Kris to Thip, while Tony finally meets Wish to get the answers he has been searching for.

== Reception ==
=== Awards ===
The first season received 6 nominations from the 21st Annual of Asian Television Awards.

Ceremony	Category	Recipient(s)	Result	Ref.
Asian Television Awards	Best Drama Series	Halfworlds	Highly Commended	
Asian Television Awards	Best Direction (Fiction)	Joko Anwar	Highly Commended	
Asian Television Awards	Best Cinematography	Ical Tanjung	Nominated	
Asian Television Awards	Best Editing	Gan Jia Yi for Episode 6	Won	
Asian Television Awards	Best Editing	Natalie Soh for Episode 8	Nominated	
Asian Television Awards	Best Theme Song	Aghi Narottama & Tony Merle	Highly Commended	

== Broadcast ==
Country	Channel
Brunei	HBO Asia; RED by HBO
Cambodia	HBO Asia; RED by HBO
Hong Kong	HBO Asia; RED by HBO
Indonesia	HBO Asia; RED by HBO
South Korea	HBO Asia; RED by HBO
Macau	HBO Asia; RED by HBO
Malaysia	HBO Asia; RED by HBO
Mongolia	HBO Asia; RED by HBO
Myanmar	HBO Asia; RED by HBO
Nepal	HBO Asia; RED by HBO
Palau	HBO Asia; RED by HBO
Papua New Guinea	HBO Asia; RED by HBO
Philippines	HBO Asia; RED by HBO
Singapore	HBO Asia; RED by HBO
Sri Lanka	HBO Asia; RED by HBO
Taiwan	HBO Asia; RED by HBO
Thailand	HBO Asia; RED by HBO
Vietnam	HBO Asia; RED by HBO
Australia	SBS 2
Brazil	Globoplay
United States	HBO
