= Rudy Habibie =

2016 film by Hanung Bramantyo

- Theatrical release poster
- Directed by: Hanung Bramantyo
- Screenplay by: Gina S. Noer; Hanung Bramantyo
- Based on: Rudy: Kisah Masa Muda Sang Visioner by Gina S. Noer
- Produced by: Manoj Punjabi
- Starring: Reza Rahadian; Chelsea Islan; Dian Nitami; Indah Permatasari; Ernest Prakasa; Boris Bokir; Rey Bong; Cornelio Sunny; Pandji Pragiwaksono; Bastian Bintang Simbolon
- Cinematography: Ipung Rachmat Syaiful
- Edited by: Wawan I. Wibowo
- Music by: Tya Subiakto
- Production company: MD Pictures
- Distributed by: MD Entertainment
- Release date: June 30, 2016
- Running time: 124 mins
- Country: Indonesia
- Languages: Indonesian; English; German; Dutch
- Box office: $4.5 million or Rp 60 billion

Rudy Habibie: Habibie & Ainun 2 (stylized in the poster as {rudy habibie} (Habibie & Ainun 2)) is a 2016 Indonesian biographical historical drama film directed by Hanung Bramantyo. It is a prequel of Habibie & Ainun. The film stars Reza Rahadian, Chelsea Islan, Boris Bokir, Ernest Prakasa, Pandji Pragiwaksono, Rey Bong and Bastian Bintang Simbolon.

== Plot ==
Tuti Marini Puspowardojo and Alwi Abdul Jalil Habibie have four children, among whom is Bacharuddin Jusuf "Rudy" Habibie. Rudy, a native of Parepare, is an aviation enthusiast, embraced by his father. Their family's early years are affected by the Japanese occupation of the Dutch East Indies, moving to Gorontalo, staying in Alwi's family's house, then to Makassar, where Alwi dies whilst in sujud. As an adult, Rudy goes to Aachen, West Germany for college. His green passport, issued to general citizens, subjects him to prejudice, as those with blue passports, issued to scholarship holders, are somehow smart, labeling him dumb; Rudy proves them wrong by memorizing a bulk of orders at a cafe without noting them down.

One day, Rudy manages to solve an aviation accident that his professor assigns to the class. This ends the bullying of him for being raised by a cannibal father. He is elected as the leader of the Aachen Indonesian Students Union (PPI Aachen), a union for all Indonesian students studying abroad, but is criticized for his unusual style of leadership. At a Tielman Brothers dance hall, Rudy meets Ilona, a Polish woman who lived in Maluku. Her love for Indonesia and poetic mindset get them closer, prompting envy from his friend Ayu Puspitasari, who has a liking for Rudy. A proposal made by Rudy for the PPI is accepted, inciting a violent political debate.

The counter-revolutionary program runs well. The Embassy of Indonesia in West Germany demands that the government of Indonesia be credited; Rudy rejects it, saying that it is not meant for them but the people. More violence causes him and his allies to be beaten. Insisting, Rudy pamphlets amid a cold winter and faints, but eventually recovers. After questioning his feelings, Ilona decides to move on from Rudy. Meanwhile, Rudy wishes his submarine concept to be made in Indonesia, but financial problems mean it can only be a German product; Rudy refuses to. When he gives up, his mother tells him not to, despite how hard it is.

At Aachen Hauptbahnhof, Ilona is about to go to Poland. Rudy meets her as scheduled. Although Ilona expects Rudy to follow her to Poland to start a new life, he does not. Ilona concedes, saying that she supports Rudy's plan to make Indonesia be better. They hug each other, and Ilona leaves. As the train moves, they tearfully look at each other.

== Cast ==
- Reza Rahadian as B. J. Habibie
  - Bastian Bintang Simbolon as teen Habibie
  - Bima Azriel as young Habibie
- Chelsea Islan as Illona Ianovska
- Ernest Prakasa as Liem Keng Kie
- Indah Permatasari as Ayu
- Pandji Pragiwaksono as Peter Manumasa
- Boris Bokir as Poltak Hasibuan
- Dian Nitami as R. A. Tuti Marini Puspowardojo
- Donny Damara as Alwi Abdul Jalil Habibie
- Manoj Punjabi as Necmettin Erbakan
