= Merry Riana =

Indonesian entrepreneur and motivator

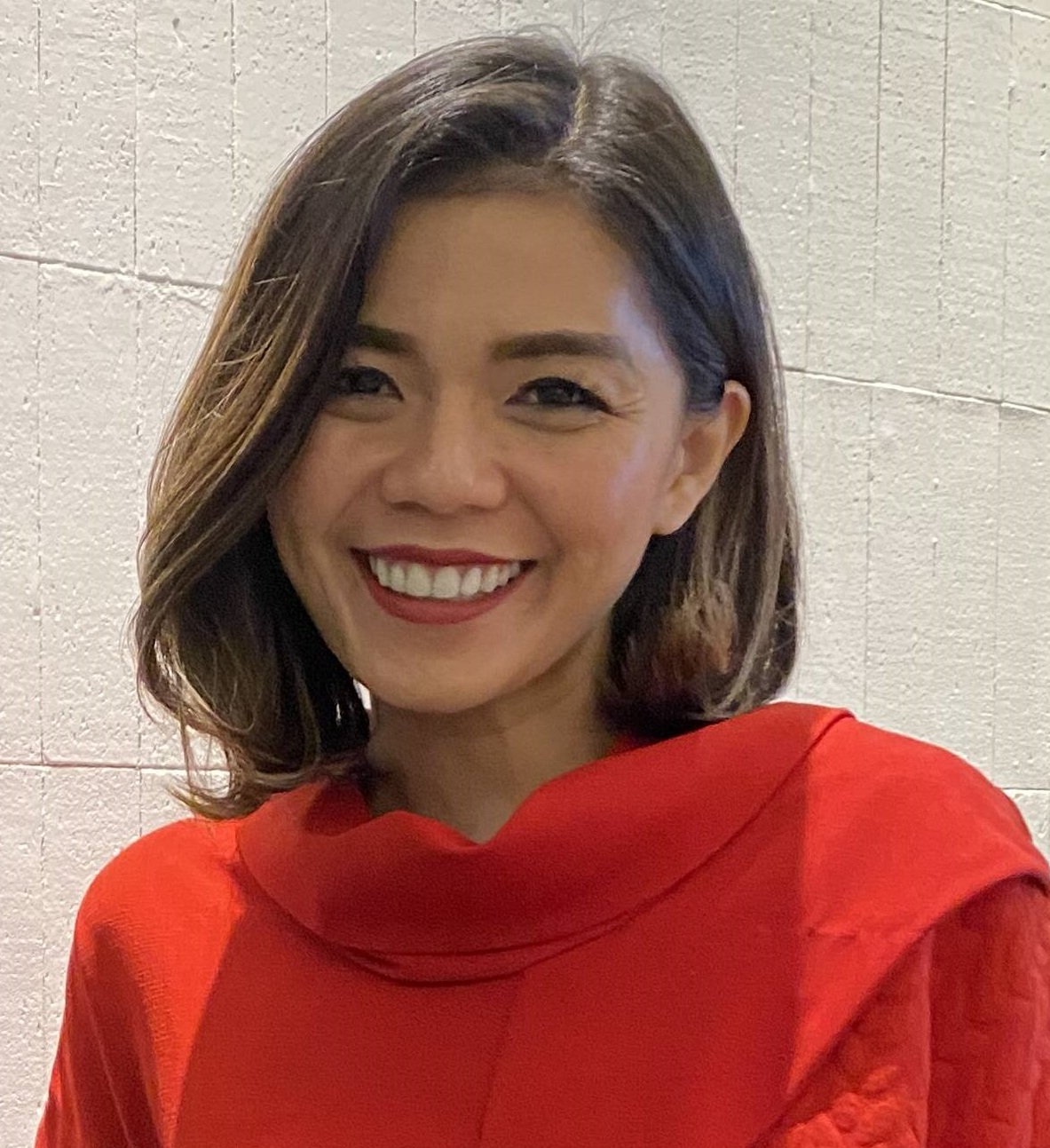
- Merry Riana in 2023
- Born: May 29, 1980 (age 45); Jakarta, Indonesia
- Occupations: Motivational speaker, Businessperson, Writer
- Years active: 2006 - present
- Political party: Democratic
- Spouse: Alva Christopher Tjenderasa (m. 2004)
- Children: 2
- Parents: Suanto Sosrosaputro (father); Lynda Sanian (mother)
- Website: merryriana.com

Merry Riana (born 29 May 1980) is a Chinese-Indonesian motivational speaker, entrepreneur, and writer.

== Early life and education ==
Merry Riana was born on 29 May 1980 to Suanto Sosrosaputro and Lynda Sanian. Her father was an entrepreneur. She is the eldest child and has two younger siblings. She enrolled in Don Bosco Primary School (1986 - 1992), Santa Ursula Junior High School (1992 - 1995) and Santa Ursula Senior High School (1995 - 1998, Science stream).

Due to the 1998 riots, she migrated to Singapore and later studied at Nanyang Technological University, taking Electrical and Electronics Engineering (EEE) major, although at first she wanted to continue her higher education at Trisakti University. She graduated from NTU in 2002 with Second Upper Honours.

== Career ==
As a college student, Merry Riana took a loan of $40,000, which she had to pay off after graduating from the university. This led her to take part-time jobs such as flyer distributor, flower shopkeeper, and banquet waiter at a hotel. In the second year, she participated in seminars and joined the business organization at the university. She also tried the thesis writing business, the Multi-Level Marketing business, and playing stocks. However, all the businesses that she tried failed, and she lost $10,000 when she played stocks.

After graduating from university, Merry Riana became an insurance sales agent. She then worked as a financial consultant in 2003. In 2004, she was promoted to manager due to her achievements. Later, she established a financial services company named Merry Riana Organization and MRO Consultancy. The latter is a company that engaged in training, motivation and book printing. In 2005, she earned Top Agency of the Year and Top Rookie Agency awards.

She published her first book titled "A Gift From A Friend," which told her life experiences while in Singapore in 2006. The book became a best seller in Singapore. In 2007, she managed to earn a million dollars. Her achievement was reported in the Singaporean national newspaper The Straits Times, on January 28, 2007.

In 2011, Merry Riana and Alberthiene Endah authored a book that told her life story in Singapore titled Mimpi Sejuta Dolar and the book became a best seller in Indonesia. Mimpi Sejuta Dolar was adapted into a film named Merry Riana: Mimpi Sejuta Dolar in 2014.

== Personal life ==
Merry Riana married Alva Christopher Tjenderasa in 2004 and the couple have two children.

== Publications ==
- A Gift From A Friend (2006)
- Mimpi Sejuta Dolar (2011)
- Merry Riana Million Dollar Dream: An Inspiring True Story About A Poor Student Who Struggled Financially Until She Achieved Her First Million Dollar At The Age Of 26! (2016)

== Awards and nominations ==
Year	Awards	Category	Result
2016	Indonesian Choice Awards	Digital Persona of the Year	Won
