= Merry Riana: Mimpi Sejuta Dolar =

2014 Indonesian biographical film

- Directed by: Hestu Saputra
- Written by: Alberthiene Endah
- Based on: Mimpi Sejuta Dolar
- Produced by: Dhamoo Punjabi; Manoj Punjabi
- Starring: Chelsea Islan; Dion Wiyoko; Kimberly Ryder; Ferry Salim; Niniek L. Karim; Sellen Fernandez; Mike Lucock; Cynthia Lamusu
- Production company: MD Pictures
- Distributed by: MD Entertainment
- Release date: December 24, 2014
- Running time: 105 minutes
- Country: Indonesia
- Languages: Indonesian; Malay; English

Merry Riana: Mimpi Sejuta Dolar (English: Merry Riana: A Million Dollar Dream) is a 2014 Indonesian biographical drama film directed by Hestu Saputra and written by Albertine Endah. This film starred Dion Wiyoko, Chelsea Islan, Kimberly Ryder and Ferry Salim. The film is based on the book Mimpi Sejuta Dolar also written by Endah. The film tells the story of Merry Riana living in Singapore because of the May 1998 riots of Indonesia, and her journey to becoming a successful motivator.

== Plot ==
The May 1998 riots of Indonesia mostly targets the ethnic Chinese. In Jakarta, 17-year-old Merry Riana's family flee to Soekarno–Hatta International Airport, where her father buys Merry a ticket to Singapore, asking her to stay there temporarily. There, she meets high school friend Irene, who shelters her at her dorm room at Nanyang Technological University (NTU). She was later caught, and upon Irene's encouragement, decides to study at NTU in order to legally stay at Irene's room, with a S$40,000 tuition fee. Irene's friend Alva promises to be her loan guarantor, but tells her to get a job. After a long endeavour, she becomes a brochure sharer, although Alva has signed the agreement anyway. Because she does not have a student pass, the store was later investigated for illegal hiring, and she cannot work there.

Irene has a crush on Alva and plans a date with him, but on the same day Alva accompanies Merry finding a new job. Merry is hired at Success Forever, a company which employs multi-level marketing. However, it turns out the company was a scam. Alva tells the dispirited Merry that setbacks are essential for success. He takes her to the Singapore Flyer, where he lets her replace him as janitor. Alva proposes to her by showing a novel titled s.h.m.i.l.y ("see how much I love you"), but Merry rejects. That night, Irene kicks Merry for being with Alva at the Flyer, seemingly romantically. Later, she leaves the room for Merry. Merry moves on from Irene, motivated by Alva, who shows her an online trading platform she can profit from.

On Valentine's Day, Alva plans to propose Merry with a ring. Merry tells Alva of an airline she can invest in. He disagrees, calling out her greed. Merry says that she is done being poor, assuming Alva has never been poor. Offended, Alva leaves and hands the ring to an old street artist. Later, the airline filed for Chapter 11 bankruptcy. Merry's mother comes to Singapore and tells her that she must finish what she started. She later becomes an insurance agent; one of her clients, Mrs. Noor, agrees to her policy for S$100,000. She also reconciles with Irene. One day, the street artist gives Alva's ring to Merry who happens to be passing by, revealing that Alva said "Shmily Merry" with regards to the ring. Merry tells Alva that she loves him and apologises for her arrogance; they then reconcile and marry upon graduation.

Merry later gained notoriety in Singapore for earning S$1 million at the age of 26.

== Songs ==
- "Sempurnalah Cinta" – Andien & Marcell
- "Sempurnalah Cinta" (solo version) – Marcell Siahaan

== Cast ==
- Dion Wiyoko as Alva
- Chelsea Islan as Merry Riana/Merry
- Karim Niniek as Miss Noor
- Kimberly Rider as Irene Lee (Irren)
- Selen Fernandes as Hars (security eater lollypop)
- Mike Lucock as Success Forever Office Manajer
- Chyntia Lamusu as Merry Riana's Mother
- Tuti Mentari as Women who playing old violin
- Ferry Salim as Merry Riana's father

Special appearance

- Julia Perez as office manager
- Bella Garnier
- Merry Riana
