= The Sinking of van der Wijck =

- Release poster
- Directed by: Sunil Soraya
- Written by: Donny Dhirgantoro; Imam Tantowi
- Based on: Tenggelamnya Kapal van der Wijck by Hamka
- Produced by: Ram Soraya; Sunil Soraya
- Starring: Herjunot Ali; Pevita Pearce; Reza Rahadian; Randy Danistha; Gesya Shandy; Arzeti Bilbina; Kevin Andrean; Jajang C. Noer
- Cinematography: Yudi Datau
- Edited by: Sastha Sunu
- Music by: Stevesmith
- Production company: Soraya Intercine Films
- Distributed by: Soraya Intercine Films
- Release date: December 19, 2013
- Running time: 165 minutes; 210 minutes (Extended)
- Country: Indonesia
- Languages: Indonesian; Minangkabau; Makassar
- Box office: US$4.6 million

The Sinking of van der Wijck (Indonesian: Tenggelamnya Kapal van der Wijck) is a 2013 Indonesian romantic drama film directed by Sunil Soraya and written by Donny Dhirgantoro and Imam Tantowi. Starring Herjunot Ali, Pevita Pearce, and Reza Rahadian, the film is based on the novel of the same name by Hamka. It was released in theaters on 19 December 2013.

== Synopsis ==
Set in the 1930s, Zainuddin (Herjunot Ali) sails from his birthplace in Makassar to his father's hometown in Batipuh, Padang Panjang. There, he meets Hayati (Pevita Pearce), a beautiful woman who is the pride of her community. The two young people fall in love, but their romance is thwarted by rigid social traditions. Zainuddin is an impoverished man without a clan; because his mother is of Makassar descent and his father is Minang, his status is not recognized in the matrilineal Minangkabau society. Consequently, he is considered to have no blood ties to his family in Minangkabau. In contrast, Hayati is a well-bred Minang woman of noble descent.

Ultimately, Zainuddin's proposal is rejected by Hayati's family, and she is forced into a marriage with Aziz (Reza Rahadian), a wealthy and influential man whom her family prefers. Devastated, Zainuddin leaves the Minang highlands and moves to Java to overcome his grief and start a new life. Through hard work, he eventually becomes a famous author whose works are celebrated throughout the Indonesian archipelago.

However, an unexpected encounter brings Hayati back into his life. At the height of his fame and wealth, Zainuddin crosses paths with Hayati during an opera performance, where she is accompanied by her husband, Aziz. Their love story faces its final ordeal when Hayati departs for her hometown aboard the SS Van der Wijck. During the voyage, the ship sinks. Before the tragedy, Zainuddin learns that Hayati's feelings for him had never faded.

== Cast ==
- Herjunot Ali as Zainuddin ("Engku")
- Pevita Pearce as Hayati ("Rangkayo")
- Reza Rahadian as Aziz
- Randy Danistha as Bang Muluk
- Arzeti Bilbina as Ibu Muluk
- Kevin Andrean as Sophian
- Mikaila Patritz as Frieda
- Jajang C. Noer as Mande Jamilah
- Niniek L. Karim as Mak Base
- Musra Dahrizal Katik Rajo Mangkuto as Hayati's grandfather (Datuk)
- Gesya Shandy as Khadijah
- Fenny Bauty as Aziz and Khadijah's mother (Bundo)
- Iris Wulur as Upik Banun

== Production ==
Tenggelamnya Kapal Van der Wijck was adapted from the masterpiece novel by the scholar and cultural figure Haji Abdul Malik Karim Amrullah, also known as Hamka. It became the most expensive film ever produced by Soraya Intercine Films. The film's director, Sunil Soraya, stated that the high cost was due to the necessity of meticulously recreating the 1930s setting as depicted in the novel. Extensive research was required to achieve maximum visual authenticity, further driving up production expenses.

The observation, pre-production, casting, and screenwriting processes began in 2008, spanning a total of five years. Sunil admitted to having doubts about completing the project due to the lengthy process. One of the most challenging elements was finding a vessel that resembled the original Van der Wijck from the 1930s. Ultimately, a replica was commissioned from the Netherlands, the country where the original ship had been built.

The editing process took four to five months following a six-month shoot consisting of 300 scenes. The final cut resulted in a duration of 2 hours and 49 minutes. All costumes were designed by Samuel Wattimena. The screenplay underwent several revisions, as the director sought to preserve the spirit and message of Hamka's novel rather than merely presenting a standard romance. Significant time was also invested in researching authentic 1930s-era props, including automobiles and clothing. Principal photography took place in Medan, Padang, Surabaya, Lombok, and Jakarta.

Another difficulty involved finding a maritime location with calm waters, as the Van der Wijck historically sank due to structural failure rather than a storm. Because the actual filming locations had rough seas, the production team brought in international experts to create the sinking effect without relying on animation. Screenwriter Donny Dhirgantoro explained that the script took two years to complete and involved in-depth research. Along with Imam Tantowi, he drafted a screenplay that remained faithful to the era, covering details from the ship's mechanics to Minang customs to assist the actors' performances.

== Music ==
The rock band Nidji was commissioned to provide the soundtrack for the film, contributing four songs. Nidji's guitarist, Andi Ariel Harsya, served as the producer for the soundtrack album. The recording process involved collaboration with Jason O'Bryan, a British musician and associate of the band. The lead single chosen for the film is titled "Sumpah & Cinta Matiku". Nidji stated that they incorporated British pop concepts with Gregorian chant elements to create a grand and epic atmosphere suitable for the film's colossal scale.

== Release ==
Tenggelamnya Kapal Van der Wijck was the highest grossing Indonesian film of 2013 with over 1.7 million admissions. The film was nominated for five awards including, Best Actor in Leading Role for Herjunot Ali, Best Actor in a Supporting Role for Reza Rahadian, and Best Adapted Screenplay, and won one award for Best Visual Effects in the 2014 Indonesian Film Festival. The extended version, which ran for 3 hours and 30 minutes, was released in September 2014.
