= Reza Rahadian =

Indonesian actor (born 1987)

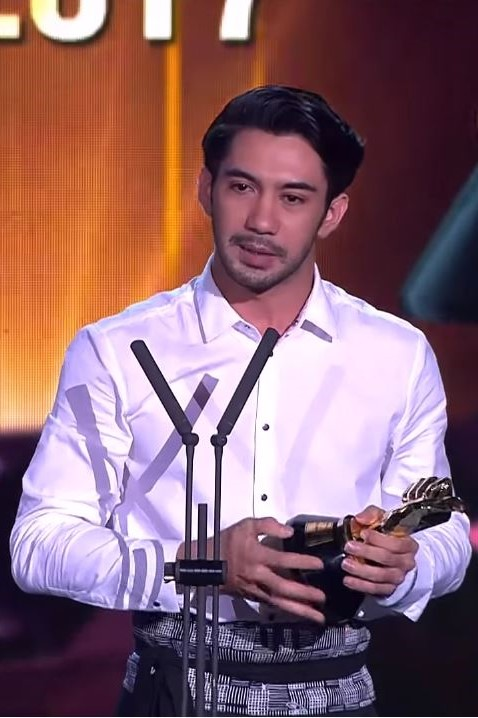
- Reza Rahadian receiving Actor of the Year award at the 2017 Indonesian Choice Awards.
- Born: Reza Rahadian Matulessy; March 5, 1987 (age 39); Bogor, West Java, Indonesia
- Occupations: Celebrity; singer; director; presenter; model; brand ambassador; radio announcer
- Years active: 2004–present
- Relatives: Fransisca Fanggidaej (grandmother)
- Awards: 4 Citra Award

Reza Rahadian Matulessy (born 5 March 1987) is an Indonesian actor, model, singer, director, and radio announcer of Persian and Ambonese descent. He was Chair of the Indonesian Film Festival for the period 2021 to 2023.

== Early life ==
He was born to an Iranian father and a Moluccan Indonesian mother whose love for film influenced him as a youth.

== Career ==
In 2004, Reza Rahadian was named Top Guest by the Indonesian variety magazine Aneka, an award recognizing emerging models, despite not pursuing modelling professionally. He regarded modelling primarily as a pathway into acting. The exposure he received led to roles in several Indonesian television soap operas, including Culunnya Pacarku and Idola. Rahadian made his feature film debut in 2007 with the horror-comedy Film Horor, followed by another horror film, Ghost Island 2, in 2008.

Rahadian's first major critical recognition came in 2009 with Hanung Bramantyo's Woman with a Turban. Although he initially auditioned for a minor role, Bramantyo cast him as Samsuddin, the abusive and polygamous husband of the protagonist Anissa (Revalina S. Temat). Following this experience, Rahadian expressed reluctance to continue working in horror films. He appeared in four films that year, including several comedies.

In 2010, Rahadian again appeared in four films, among them 3 Hati Dua Dunia, Satu Cinta and How Funny (This Country Is). The former, which explores interfaith romance, received the Citra Award for Best Film at the 2010 Indonesian Film Festival, while the latter was selected as Indonesia's submission for the 83rd Academy Awards. Rahadian continued his prolific output in 2011 with four additional films, including Kamila Andini's The Mirror Never Lies, in which he portrayed Tudo, a dolphin expert. To prepare for the role, he undertook research on dolphin behavior at Ancol in North Jakarta. Beyond acting, he directed a short film titled Sebelah (A Side).

In 2012, he appeared in six films. For BrokenHearts, he lost 10 kilograms (22 lb) to portray an anorexic character. He also starred in Perahu Kertas and its sequel, adaptations of Dewi Lestari's novel, playing Remi, a businessman who becomes a romantic rival to the protagonist. Critics noted his performance for conveying the character's internal conflict between professional ambition and romantic attachment.

Later that year, Rahadian portrayed former Indonesian president B. J. Habibie in Faozan Rizal's biographical film Habibie & Ainun, which depicts Habibie's relationship with Ainun, played by Bunga Citra Lestari. His performance was widely praised for its accurate representation of Habibie's mannerisms and character. He reprised the role in the 2016 prequel Rudy Habibie. In 2017, Rahadian starred in the romantic drama Critical Eleven with Adinia Wirasti. He made his feature directorial debut with On Your Lap in 2025.

== Filmography ==
=== Film ===
Key
†	Denotes films that have not yet been released

Year	Title	Role	Notes
2007	Film Horror	Beni	Debut film
2008	Pulau Hantu 2	Michael	
2009	Perempuan Berkalung Sorban	Samsuddin	
2009	Kirun + Adul	Nugroho	
2009	Queen Bee	Braga	
2009	Perjaka Terakhir	Gerry	
2009	Emak Ingin Naik Haji	Zein	
2010	Hari Untuk Amanda	Doddy	
2010	How Funny (This Country Is)	Muluk	
2010	3 Hati Dua Dunia, Satu Cinta	Rosid	
2010	Jakarta Twilight		
2011	Love Story	Pengkor	
2011	?	Soleh	
2011	The Mirror Never Lies	Tudo	
2011	Hafalan Shalat Delisa	Abi Usman	
2012	Dilema	Adrian	
2012	BrokenHearts	Jamie Gondokusumo	
2012	Perahu Kertas	Remi	
2012	Test Pack: You Are My Baby	Rahmat	
2012	Perahu Kertas 2	Remi	
2012	Habibie & Ainun	B. J. Habibie	
2013	Something in the Way	Ahmad	
2013	Finding Srimulat	Adika Fajar	
2013	Wanita Tetap Wanita	Himself	As director; cameo appearance
2013	Isyarat - Gadis Indigo	—	As director
2013	Tenggelamnya Kapal van der Wijck	Aziz	
2014	Ketika Tuhan Jatuh Cinta	Fikri	
2014	Yasmine	Fahri	
2014	Strawberry Surprise	Timur Angin	
2014	The Golden Cane Warrior	Biru	
2015	When Will You Get Married?	Satrio	
2015	Guru Bangsa: Tjokroaminoto	Tjokroaminoto	
2015	Battle of Surabaya	Danu	Voice role
2016	Talak 3	Bimo	
2016	My Stupid Boss	Bossman	
2016	Rudy Habibie	B. J. Habibie "Rudy Habibie"	
2016	3 Srikandi	Donald Pandiangan	
2016	Terpana	Man From Somewhere	
2017	Surga Yang Tak Dirindukan 2	Dr. Syarief	
2017	Kartini	Kartono	
2017	Critical Eleven	Aldebaran Risjad	
2017	Insya Allah Sah	Taxi Driver	Cameo appearance
2017	Firegate	Tomo Gunadi	
2017	Laut Bercerita: The Sea Speaks His Name	Biru Laut	Short film
2018	Benyamin Biangkerok	Pengki	
2018	The Gift	Harun	
2019	My Stupid Boss 2	Bossman	
2019	Twivortiare	Dr. Beno Wicaksono	
2019	Imperfect	Dika	
2019	Habibie & Ainun 3	B.J. Habibie	
2020	Toko Barang Mantan	Tristan	
2020	Abracadabra	Lukman	
2020	Benyamin Biang Kerok 2	Pengki	
2021	Layla Majnun	Qais / Majnun	
2021	Surga Yang Tak Dirindukan 3	Ray	
2021	Konfabulasi	Bilal	Short film
2022	Sri Asih	Jatmiko / Roh Setan	
2023	Innocent Vengeance	Adam Gunawan	
2024	24 Hours with Gaspar	Gaspar	
2024	Grave Torture	Adil	
2025	The Most Beautiful Girl in the World	Reuben Wiraatmadja	
2025	Gowok: Javanese Kamasutra	Kamanjaya	
2026	The Sea Speaks His Name †	Laut Biru	Post-production

=== Television series ===
Year	Title	Role	TV Network
2004	ABG		RCTI
2004 - 2005	Inikah Rasanya		SCTV
2004 - 2005	Culunnya Pacarku		RCTI
2005	Cinta SMU 2		INDOSIAR
2005 - 2006	Habibi dan Habibah		RCTI
2006	Aku Hamil	Sony	MNCTV
2006 - 2007	Idola		RCTI
2007	Cewek Penakluk	Fahri	INDOSIAR
2009	Isabella	Langit	RCTI
2013	That Winter, the Wind Blows	Oh Soo (voice dubbing)	TRANSTV
2015	Tetangga Masa Gitu?	Rully Ernando	NET.
2015	Dibawah Lindungan Abah	Gaza	TRANSTV
2015-2016	Halfworlds Season 1	Tony	HBO Asia
2017	Halfworlds Season 2	Tony	HBO Asia
2019	Masjid Yang Tak Dirindukan	Malik Aryaputra	ANTV
2022	What We Lose to Love	Rendra	Disney+ Hotstar

=== Telefilm ===
Year	Title	Role	Network	Notes
2010	Badik Titipan Ayah	Andi Aso	SCTV	
2010	Perempuan di Rumah Ibu		SCTV	
2011	Putri Juragan Angkot	Sion	SCTV	
2011	From Pizza With Love		RCTI	
2011	Cinta Not For Sale		SCTV	
2011	Indahnya Cinta Masa Muda	Suparno	SCTV	
2012	Teka-Teki Cinta Mayang	Thomas / Jarwo / Alex	SCTV	
2013	Ada Cinta di Ulekan Rujak	Ramdan	RCTI	
2013	Cintaku Nyangkut di Jarum Jahit	Jajat	RCTI	
2014	Cinta Anak Juragan Teh		RCTI	

=== TV Show ===
Year	Title	Role	Network	Notes
2013	Grand Launching NET.	Host	NET. YouTube	
2014	Gebyar BCA - Masquerade	Host	NET.	with Marissa Anita
2014	Gebyar BCA - Great Gatsby	Host	NET.	with Sarah Sechan
2014	Wajah Femina	Judges	NET.	
2014	Grand Final Miss Celebrity Indonesia Season 6	Judges	SCTV	
2015	19th Puteri Indonesia	Judges	INDOSIAR	
2015	Grand Final Miss Celebrity Indonesia Season 7	Judges	SCTV	
2016	Layar Perak	Host	METROTV	with Christine Hakim

=== Theatre ===
Year	Title	Role
2015	Alkisah: Rio Motret	Nakula / Sadewa
2016	Bunga Penutup Abad	Minke
2017	Perempuan-Perempuan Chairil	Chairil Anwar

== Awards and nominations ==
Year	Award	Category	Nominated work	Result
2009	Indonesian Film Festival	Citra Award for Best Leading Actor	Emak Ingin Naik Haji	Nominated
2009	Indonesian Film Festival	Citra Award for Best Supporting Actor	Woman with a Turban	Won
2010	Bandung Film Festival	Best Actor	Emak Ingin Naik Haji	Won
2010	Indonesian Film Festival	Citra Award for Best Leading Actor	3 Hati Dua Dunia, Satu Cinta	Won
2010	Indonesian Film Festival	Citra Award for Best Leading Actor	How Funny (This Country Is)	Nominated
2011	Bandung Film Festival	Best Film Actor	3 Hati Dua Dunia, Satu Cinta	Nominated
2011	Indonesian Movie Actors Awards	Best Actor	How Funny (This Country Is)	Nominated
2011	Indonesian Movie Actors Awards	Best Actor	3 Hati Dua Dunia, Satu Cinta	Won
2011	Indonesian Movie Actors Awards	Best Chemistry (with Laura Basuki)	3 Hati Dua Dunia, Satu Cinta	Nominated
2011	Indonesian Movie Actors Awards	Favorite Actor	3 Hati Dua Dunia, Satu Cinta	Nominated
2011	Indonesian Movie Actors Awards	Favorite Actor	How Funny (This Country Is)	Nominated
2011	Indonesian Movie Actors Awards	Favorite Chemistry (with Laura Basuki)	3 Hati Dua Dunia, Satu Cinta	Nominated
2011	ELLE Style Awards	Actor of the Year	3 Hati Dua Dunia, Satu Cinta	Won
2012	Bandung Film Festival	Best Film Actor	The Mirror Never Lies	Nominated
2012	Indonesian Movie Actors Awards	Best Chemistry (with Adinia Wirasti)	Jakarta Twilight	Won
2012	Indonesian Film Festival	Citra Award for Best Leading Actor	Test Pack: You're My Baby	Nominated
2012	Maya Award	Best Actor in a Leading Role	Test Pack: You're My Baby	Nominated
2012	Appreciation of Indonesian Film	Best Leading Actor	Hafalan Shalat Delisa	Nominated
2013	Infotainment Awards	Most Alluring Male Celebrity	—N/a	Nominated
2013	Indonesian Movie Actors Awards	Best Actor	Habibie & Ainun	Nominated
2013	Indonesian Movie Actors Awards	Best Couple with Bunga Citra Lestari	Habibie & Ainun	Nominated
2013	Indonesian Movie Actors Awards	Best Chemistry (with Acha Septriasa)	Test Pack: You're My Baby	Nominated
2013	Indonesian Movie Actors Awards	Favorite Actor	Habibie & Ainun	Won
2013	Indonesia Kids' Choice Awards	Favorite Actor	—N/a	Won
2013	Bandung Film Festival	Best Film Actor	Habibie & Ainun	Won
2013	Bandung Film Festival	Best Supporting Film Actor	Perahu Kertas	Nominated
2013	Grazia Glitz & Glam Awards	Most Stylish Celebrity	—N/a	Won
2013	Insert Awards	Sexiest Male Celebrity	—N/a	Nominated
2013	Yahoo! OMG Awards	Celeb of the Year	—N/a	Nominated
2013	Yahoo! OMG Awards	Friendliest Celebrity	—N/a	Won
2013	Indonesian Film Festival	Best Leading Actor	Habibie & Ainun	Won
2013	Maya Award	Best Actor in a Leading Role	Habibie & Ainun	Won
2014	Infotainment Awards	Most Alluring Male Celebrity	—N/a	Nominated
2014	Infotainment Awards	Most Awaited Celebrity Appearances	—N/a	Won
2014	Infotainment Awards	Celebrity of the Year	—N/a	Won
2014	Focus Celebrities Awards	Most Focus Male Celebrity	—N/a	Won
2014	ME Movie Festival	Most Favourite Boy	Tenggelamnya Kapal van der Wijck	Nominated
2014	Global Seru Awards	Most Exciting Actor	—N/a	Won
2014	Indonesian Choice Awards	Actor of the Year	—N/a	Nominated
2014	Bandung Film Festival	Best Supporting Film Actor	Tenggelamnya Kapal van der Wijck	Nominated
2014	Indonesian Film Festival	Best Supporting Actor	Tenggelamnya Kapal van der Wijck	Nominated
2014	Maya Awards	Best Supporting Actor	Tenggelamnya Kapal van der Wijck	Nominated
2015	Bintang RPTI	Favorite Actor	—N/a	Nominated
2015	Insert Fashion Awards	Most Fashionable Male Celebrity	—N/a	Nominated
2015	Style Makers Awards	Most Stylish Male Celebrity	—N/a	Won
2015	Global Seru Awards	Most Exciting Actor	—N/a	Nominated
2015	Global Seru Awards	Most Exciting - Special Award	—N/a	Won
2015	Indonesian Movie Actors Awards	Best Actor	Strawberry Surprise	Nominated
2015	Indonesian Movie Actors Awards	Favorite Actor	Strawberry Surprise	Nominated
2015	Indonesian Movie Actors Awards	Best Chemistry with Acha Septriasa	Strawberry Surprise	Nominated
2015	Indonesian Choice Awards	Actor of the Year	—N/a	Nominated
2015	Bandung Film Festival	Best Serial TV Actor	Di Bawah Lindungan Abah	Nominated
2015	Bandung Film Festival	Best Film Actor	Guru Bangsa: Tjokroaminoto	Nominated
2015	Indonesian Film Festival	Best Leading Actor	Guru Bangsa: Tjokroaminoto	Nominated
2015	Indonesian Film Festival	Best Leading Actor	When Will You Get Married?	Nominated
2015	4th Maya Awards	Best Actor in a Leading Role	Guru Bangsa: Tjokroaminoto	Nominated
2016	Infotainment Awards	Most Fashionable Male Celebrity	—N/a	Nominated
2016	Dahsyatnya Awards	Outstanding Video Clip Model	"Bukan Adan Hawa"	Nominated
2016	Usmar Ismail Awards	Best Actor	Guru Bangsa: Tjokroaminoto	Nominated
2016	Usmar Ismail Awards	Audience Favorite Actor	—N/a	Won
2016	Insert Fashion Awards	Favorite Male Celebrity	—N/a	Won
2016	Indonesian Choice Awards	Actor of the Year	—N/a	Won
2016	Indonesian Movie Actors Awards	Best Actor	Guru Bangsa: Tjokroaminoto	Nominated
2016	Indonesian Movie Actors Awards	Favorite Actor	Guru Bangsa: Tjokroaminoto	Nominated
2016	Indonesian Movie Actors Awards	Best Ensemble	Guru Bangsa: Tjokroaminoto	Won
2016	Indonesia Kids' Choice Awards	Favorite Actor	—N/a	Nominated
2016	Bandung Film Festival	Best Film Actor	My Stupid Boss	Won
2016	Bandung Film Festival	Best Film Actor	Rudy Habibie	Nominated
2016	Selebrita Awards	Terseleb Film Star	—N/a	Won
2016	Indonesian Film Festival	Best Leading Actor	My Stupid Boss	Won
2016	Indonesian Film Festival	Best Leading Actor	Rudy Habibie	Nominated
2016	Maya Awards	Best Actor in a Leading Role	My Stupid Boss	Won
2017	Infotainment Awards	Most Awaited Celebrity Appearances	—N/a	Nominated
2017	Infotainment Awards	Most Fashionable Male Celebrity	—N/a	Nominated
2017	Infotainment Awards	Celebrity of the Year	—N/a	Won
2017	9th Dahsyatnya Awards	Outstanding Video Clip Model	"Intuisi"	Nominated
2017	Indonesian Box Office Movie Awards	Best Male Actor	My Stupid Boss	Nominated
2017	Indonesian Box Office Movie Awards	Best Male Actor	Rudy Habibie	Nominated
2017	Indonesian Box Office Movie Awards	Best Ensemble Talent	My Stupid Boss	Nominated
2017	Indonesian Box Office Movie Awards	Best Ensemble Talent	Rudy Habibie	Nominated
2017	Usmar Ismail Awards	Best Leading Actor	Rudy Habibie	Nominated
2017	Usmar Ismail Awards	Favorite Male Actor	My Stupid Boss	Won
2017	Jawa Pos Readers Choice Awards	Favorite Actor	—N/a	Won
2017	Indonesia Kids' Choice Awards	Favorite Movie Star	—N/a	Nominated
2017	Indonesia Kids' Choice Awards	Big Inspiration Award	—N/a	Won
2017	Indonesian Movie Actors Awards	Best Actor	My Stupid Boss	Won
2017	Indonesian Movie Actors Awards	Favorite Male Actor	My Stupid Boss	Won
2017	Indonesian Movie Actors Awards	Best Ensemble	My Stupid Boss	Won
2017	Indonesian Choice Awards	Actor of the Year	—N/a	Won
2017	Asia-Pacific Film Festival	Best Actor	Rudy Habibie	Won
2017	Selebrita Awards	Terseleb Film Star	—N/a	Won
2017	Selebrita Awards	Seleb Tereksis	—N/a	Nominated
2017	Bandung Film Festival	Best Film Actor	Critical Eleven	Nominated
2017	PIFFA Supreme Awards	Best Actor	Critical Eleven	Nominated
2017	Maya Awards	Best Actor in a Leading Role	Critical Eleven	Won
2018	Indonesian Box Office Movie Awards	Best Supporting Actor	Surga Yang Tak Dirindukan 2	Nominated
2018	Indonesian Box Office Movie Awards	Best Ensemble Talent	Surga Yang Tak Dirindukan 2	Nominated
2018	Indonesian Choice Awards	Actor of the Year	—N/a	Nominated
2018	Indonesian Movie Actors Awards	Best Actor	Critical Eleven	Nominated
2018	Indonesian Movie Actors Awards	Favorite Male Actor	Critical Eleven	Nominated
2018	Indonesian Movie Actors Awards	Best Ensemble	Kartini	Nominated
2018	DaMan 11th Anniversary Awards	Gentleman of the Year	—N/a	Won
2018	Top 10 Asia Awards	Asia Film Award - Indonesia's Inspiring Talent	—N/a	Won
2018	JAFF Indonesian Screen Awards	Best Performance	If This Is My Story	Won
2018	Johnny Andrean Awards	Best Hairstyle for Actor	—N/a	Nominated
2018	Asian Academy Creative Award	Best Actor in a Leading Role	Critical Eleven	Nominated
2020	Maya Awards	Best Actor	Habibie & Ainun 3	Nominated
2020	Maya Awards	Best Actor	Twivortiare	Nominated

== Works cited ==
- "'3 Hati, 2 Dunia, 1 Cinta' Wins Best Picture at 2010 Indonesian Film Festival". The Jakarta Globe. 7 December 2010. Archived from the original on 9 January 2012.
- Emond, Bruce (6 January 2012). "Playing the Part". The Jakarta Post. Archived from the original on 19 June 2012.
- Kurniasari, Triwik (16 January 2011). "Reza Rahardian: Young Actor with Many Faces". The Jakarta Post. Archived from the original on 11 November 2014.
- "Mantap! Film 'Alangkah Lucunya Negeri Ini' Lolos Seleksi Awal Oscar" [Great! The Film 'Alangkah Lucunya Negeri Ini' Passes Primary Oscar Selection]. Kompas. 14 October 2010. Archived from the original on 4 November 2012.
- "Nominasi Festival Film Bandung 2012" [Nominations for 2012 Bandung Film Festival]. KapanLagi.com (in Indonesian). Jakarta. 1 May 2012. Archived from the original on 13 April 2013.
- Prathivi, Niken (7 October 2012). "The chosen heart". The Jakarta Post. p. 4. Archived from the original on 22 February 2013.
- Prathivi, Niken (23 December 2012). "'Habibie & Ainun': Relentless strength behind Habibie". The Jakarta Post. p. 3. Archived from the original on 31 January 2013.
- "Reza Rahadian". filmindonesia.or.id (in Indonesian). Jakarta: Konfiden Foundation. Archived from the original on 31 August 2013.
- "Reza Rahadian | Filmografi" [Reza Rahadian | Filmografi]. filmindonesia.or.id (in Indonesian). Jakarta: Konfiden Foundation. Archived from the original on 7 July 2014.
- "Reza Rahadian | Penghargaan" [Reza Rahadian | Awards]. filmindonesia.or.id (in Indonesian). Jakarta: Konfiden Foundation. Archived from the original on 7 July 2014.
- Setiawati, Indah (20 May 2012). "Reza Rahadian: All about making movies". The Jakarta Post. Archived from the original on 17 May 2013.
