= Test Pack =

- Poster film
- Directed by: Monty Tiwa
- Produced by: Chand Parwez Servia; Fiaz Servia
- Starring: Reza Rahadian; Acha Septriasa; Renata Kusmanto; Meriam Bellina; Jaja Mihardja; Uli Herdinansyah; Dwi Sasono; Oon Project Pop
- Distributed by: Kharisma Starvision Plus
- Release date: 6 September 2012
- Running time: 105 minutes
- Country: Indonesia
- Language: Indonesia

Test Pack (Original title: Test Pack: You're My Baby), is an Indonesian drama comedy film directed by Monty Tiwa. The film released on 6 September 2012, and starred by Acha Septriasa, Reza Rahadian, Renata Kusmanto, Dwi Sasono, and Meriam Bellina.

The film was nominated for "Favorite Film", but loses to Habibie & Ainun at the 2013 Indonesian Movie Awards.

== Plot ==
Rahmat (Reza Rahadian), a psychologist who specializes in marriage counseling, and Tata (Acha Septriasa), working in advertising, have been married 7 years without children. While Rahmat is happy with their current life, Tata is set on having children and has made it her number one priority, trying everything from nutrition, fertility calendars, and even sexual positions to reach her goal of having a family. Admitting their difficulties with having a baby, Tata and Rahmat decide to see a doctor (Oon Project Pop) for help. Shinta (Renata Kusmanto), Rahmat's ex-girlfriend, is a supermodel who has broken through and gone international but whose husband, Heru (Dwi Sasono), has divorced because of her infertility. When Rahmat finds that he's infertile, his life with Tata and all that they have built together is in jeopardy. Tata becomes angry and hurt while Rahmat, needing someone to talk to who can understand him, begins spending time with Shinta.

== Cast ==
- Reza Rahadian as Rahmat
- Acha Septriasa as Tata
- Renata Kusmanto as Shinta
- Dwi Sasono as Heru
- Oon Project Pop as Doctor Peni
- Meriam Bellina as Mrs. Sutoyo
- Jaja Mihardja as Mr. Sutoyo
- Gading Marten as Zuki
- Uli Herdinansyah as Markus
- Fitri Sechan as Yani
- Agung Hercules as Ahmad
- Karissa Habibie as Dian
- Ratna Riantiarno as Rahmat' mother

=== Cameo ===
- Endhita as Pregnant mother
- Ade Habibie as The photographer

== Awards and nominations ==
| Year | Awards | Category | Recipients | Result |
|---|---|---|---|---|
| 2012 | Indonesian Film Festival | Best Leading Actor | Reza Rahadian | Nominated |
| 2012 | Indonesian Film Festival | Best Leading Actress | Acha Septriasa | Won |
| 2012 | Indonesian Film Festival | Best Supporting Actress | Meriam Bellina | Nominated |
| 2012 | Maya Awards | Best Actor in a Leading Role | Reza Rahadian | Nominated |
| 2012 | Maya Awards | Best Actress in a Leading Role | Acha Septriasa | Nominated |
| 2012 | Maya Awards | Best Actress in a Supporting Role | Meriam Bellina | Nominated |
| 2013 | Festival Film Bandung | Best Female Leading Role | Acha Septriasa | Won |
| 2013 | Festival Film Bandung | Best Female Supporting Role | Renata Kusmanto | Nominated |
| 2013 | Festival Film Bandung | Best Screenwriter | Andhita Mulya | Nominated |
| 2013 | Festival Film Bandung | Best Sound System | Khikmawan Santosa | Nominated |
| 2013 | Indonesian Movie Awards | Best Actress | Acha Septriasa | Nominated |
| 2013 | Indonesian Movie Awards | Best Supporting Actress | Meriam Bellina | Nominated |
| 2013 | Indonesian Movie Awards | Best Chemistry | Reza Rahadian and Acha Septriasa | Nominated |
| 2013 | Indonesian Movie Awards | Favorite Actress | Acha Septriasa | Nominated |
| 2013 | Indonesian Movie Awards | Favorite Film | Test Pack | Nominated |
