= Alex Abbad =

Indonesian actor and presenter

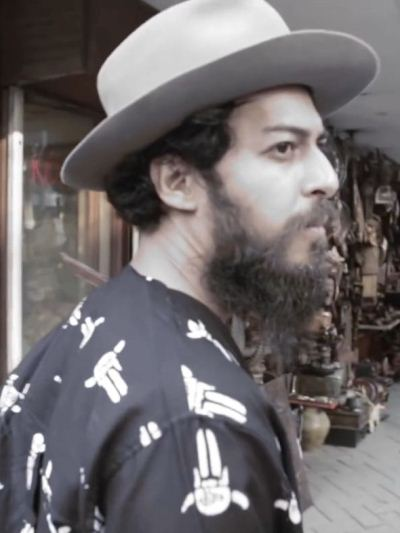
- Born: Alex Abdullah Abbad; June 18, 1978 (age 47); Jakarta, Indonesia
- Other name: Alex Abbad
- Occupations: Actor; Presenter

Alex Abdullah Abbad (born June 18, 1978), sometimes known as Alex Abbad, is an Indonesian actor, poet, host, musician, visual artist, and music producer.

== Career ==
He started off his career as MTV Asia's VJ in the 90's and rose to become an actor.

He starred in an HBO Original Series Halfworlds (2015) directed by Joko Anwar. In addition, Alex also starred in The Raid 2 (2014) and in Merantau (2009), both directed by Gareth Evans.

Alex also won the Festival Film Indonesia (FFI) for Best Supporting Actor in My Stupid Boss (2016) and also nominated for the same category the next year for Night Bus (2017).

== Filmography ==
=== Film ===
Year	Title	role	notes
2002	Andai Ia Tahu	Jimmy Edward Benedictus	
2005	Vina Bilang Cinta	Ono	
2006	Jatuh Cinta Lagi	Irfan	
2008	XL (Extra Large): Antara Aku, Kau dan Mak Erot	Juno	
2008	Cinta Setaman	Rio	Segmen: Pisang Ambon Teman Rio
2008	Pencarian Terakhir	Oji	
2009	Merantau	Johni	
2009	Suster Keramas	Roy Konak	
2010	Bahwa Cinta Itu Ada	Fuad	
2010	Roman Picisan	Tomtom	
2010	Rokkap	Bow	
2010	Aku atau Dia?	Phillipe	
2011	Virgin 3: Satu Malam Mengubah Segalanya	Allan	
2011	Cowok Bikin Pusing	Alex	
2012	Rayya, Cahaya di Atas Cahaya	Kemal	
2013	99 Cahaya di Langit Eropa	Khan	
2014	99 Cahaya di Langit Eropa Part 2	Khan	
2014	The Raid 2	Bejo	
2015	Melancholy is a Movement	himself	
2015	Tjokroaminoto: Guru Bangsa	Abdullah	
2016	My Stupid Boss	Dika	
2016	Wonderful Life	Aga	
2017	Bid'ah Cinta	Ustad Jaiz	
2017	Night Bus	Mahdi	
2018	Buffalo Boys	Fakar	
2018	Gila Lu Ndro!	Director	
2018	Asih	Mbah Marwan	
2018	Hanum & Rangga: Faith & the City	Sam	
2018	Suzzanna: Bernapas dalam Kubur	Dudun	
2019	Perjanjian dengan Iblis	Salim	
2019	My Stupid Boss 2	Dika	
2021	Nussa	Abba	Pengisi suara
2023	Jatuh Cinta Seperti di Film-Film	Yoram	
2024	Suami yang Lain	himself	
2024	Monster	Jack	
2024	Azzamine	Abi Farhan	
2025	This City Is a Battlefield	Tentara Sepoy	
2025	Pencarian Terakhir	Oji	
2025	Skyline: Warpath †		upcoming
2026	Tuhan, Benarkah Kau Mendengarku? †	Vijay	upcoming
TBA	Dadu †	Dani	upcoming

Key
†	Denotes films that have not yet been released

- TBA: To be announced

=== Television series ===
Year	Title	Role
2006	Indahnya Karuniamu	
2014	Kisah 9 Wali	Syekh Siti Jenar
2015	Halfworlds	Gorga

== Awards and nominations ==
Year	Award	Category	Recipients	Result
2016	Indonesian Film Festival	Citra Award for Best Supporting Actor	My Stupid Boss	Won
2024	Indonesian Film Festival	Citra Award for Best Supporting Actor	Falling In Love Like In Movies	Won
