= Pinky swear =

Gesture signifying a promise

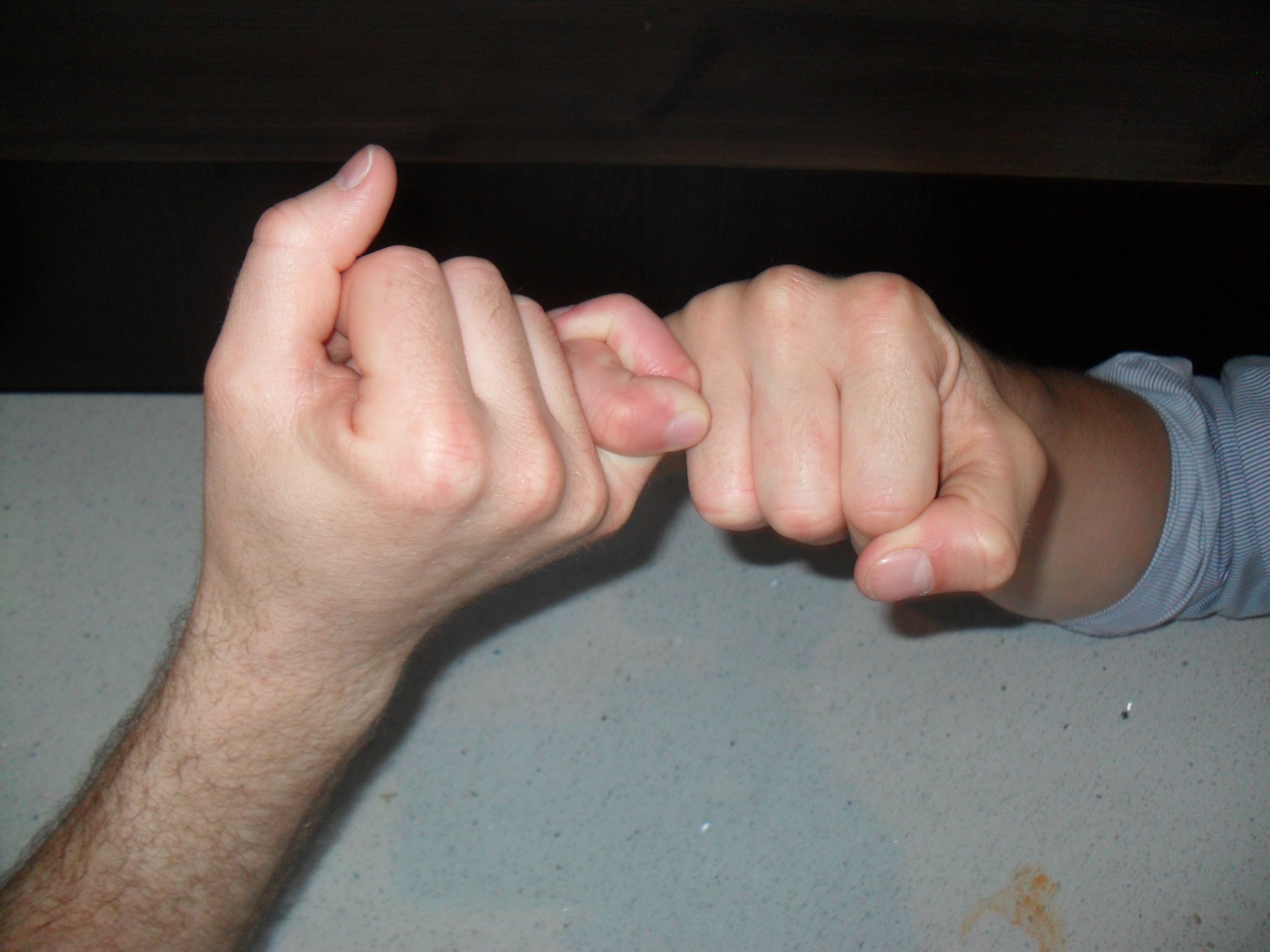
Pinky promise

A pinky swear, or pinky promise, is a traditional gesture most commonly practiced amongst children involving the locking of the pinkies of two people to signify that a promise has been made. The tradition appears to be a relatively modern invention, possibly as a continuation of older finger traditions.

== Prevalence worldwide ==
In North America, it is most common amongst school-aged children or adults and close friends and has existed since at least 1860, when the Dictionary of Americanisms listed the following accompanying promise:

Pinky, pinky, bow-bell,
Whoever tells a lie
Will sink down to the bad place,
And never rise up again.

Pinky swearing has origins in Japan from 1600 to 1803, where it is called yubikiri (指切り; "finger cut-off") and often additionally confirmed with the vow "Pinky swear, whoever lies will be made to swallow a thousand needles." (指切り拳万、嘘ついたら針千本呑ます, "Yubikiri genman, uso tsuitara hari senbon nomasu.")

In South Korea in the 21st century, the hooked pinky has been followed by a "seal", wherein the thumbs touch each other while the pinkies are still hooked.

In Taiwan, stamping after hooking pinkies has been commonplace for over 30 years.

In Belfast, Northern Ireland it is referred to as a "piggy promise".

In Italy, a similar tradition is called "giurin giurello" or "giurin giuretto/-a".

In Maharashtra, (a state of North India), this concept is called gatti fu in the Marathi language.

There is also another pinky swear promise made between children in the Isle of Man. It goes:

Make friends, make friends,
Never ever break friends,
If you do,
You'll catch the flu,
And that will be the end of you!

In Slavic countries, children hook pinkies as a sign that they made peace with each other after a row. The pinky swear promise is that even if they fight again, they will remain friends.

== See also ==
- Children's games
- Jinx (game)
