= 3 Heroines =

3 Srikandi
- Release poster
- Directed by: Iman Brotoseno
- Written by: Swastika Nohara; Iman Brotoseno
- Produced by: Raam Punjabi
- Starring: Reza Rahadian; Bunga Citra Lestari; Chelsea Islan; Tara Basro; Donny Damara; Mario Irwinsyah; Indra Birowo; Detri Warmanto
- Distributed by: MVP Pictures
- Release date: August 4, 2016
- Country: Indonesia
- Language: Indonesia

3 Srikandi (heroines) is a 2016 Indonesian biographical film directed by Iman Brotoseno. The film tells the story of three Indonesian archers (Kusuma Wardhani, Nurfitriyana Saiman and Lilies Handayani) who won Indonesia's first Olympic medal at the 1988 Seoul Olympics. It premiered on August 4, 2016.

== Synopsis ==
Set in Indonesia in 1988, the film follows the national archery team's preparations for the 1988 Summer Olympics in Seoul, South Korea. With no other suitable coach available to prepare the women's archery team, the team recruits Donald Pandiangan (Reza Rahardian), nicknamed "Indonesian Robin Hood."

Donald, however, has been forced to withdraw from the 1980 Summer Olympics in Moscow for political reasons. He has since distanced himself from both archery and sports. In addition to the coach, the archery team must also select three elite female athletes. They are Nurfitriyana Saiman (Bunga Citra Lestari), Lilies Handayani (Chelsea Islan), and Kusuma Wardhani (Tara Basro).

As the Olympics approach, the three selected athletes, referred to as Srikandi (Indonesian for heroines) each face their personal challenges. Facing the possibility of not being sent to the games at all, the archery association administrator Mr. Udi (Donny Damara), convinces Donald to prepare a women's archery team.

Donald coaches Yana, Lilies, and Suma through an intensive training period marked by internal conflict and time pressure. The women's archery team goes on to compete at Seoul.

== Cast ==
- Reza Rahardian as Donald Pandiangan
- Bunga Citra Lestari as Nurfitriyana Saiman
- Chelsea Islan as Lilies Handayani
- Tara Basro as Kusuma Wardhani

== Production ==
3 Heroines is a film that MVP Pictures planned to be released at the end of 2015 but was postponed until mid-2016 to coincide with the 2016 Summer Olympics. The film, which tells the story of 3 Indonesian female archers who won the first Olympic medal for Indonesia, was originally going to feature Dian Sastrowardoyo as Nurfitriyana Saiman, but due to a conflict with the shooting of another film, it was replaced by Bunga Citra Lestari
