= Asisten Rumah Tangga =

Indonesian soap opera

- Genre: Musical Comedy Drama
- Created by: SinemArt
- Written by: Vemmy Sagita; Respati Wulandari
- Directed by: Vemmy Sagita
- Starring: Celine Evangelista; Dirly; Mischa Chandrawinata; Ana Pinem; Marcella Simon; Natalie Sarah; Sasha Alexa; Fatmasury; Attalarik Syah; Eeng Saptahadi; Fanny Fadillah; Ria Probo; Purwaniatun; Yoelitta Palar; Suhel Fahmi; Cantik Salshabila; Aura Kasih; Meriam Bellina; Asri Pramawati
- Theme music composer: Rina Nose
- Opening theme: Rina Nose, Maju Mundur Cantik
- Ending theme: Rina Nose, Maju Mundur Cantik
- Country of origin: Indonesia
- Original language: Indonesian
- No. of seasons: 2
- No. of episodes: 73

Production
- Executive producer: Ely Yanti Noor
- Producer: Leo Sutanto
- Production locations: Jakarta, Indonesia
- Running time: One hour (22:00-23:00pm Indonesian Western Time)
- Production company: SinemArt

Original release
- Network: RCTI
- Release: March 27 – September 3, 2016

Asisten Rumah Tangga is an Indonesian soap opera produced by SinemArt. It first aired on RCTI on March 27, 2016.

== Synopsis ==
The plot of this series revolves around the main character, Anna, played by Celine Evangelista. She leaves her poor hometown to seek a fortune in the capital city of Jakarta. While attending university in Jakarta, Anna struggles financially, which leads her to work as a maid for a businessman named Rio, played by Dirly.

Rio is kind and supportive of Anna and helps pay for her food and clothes. Although the two fall in love, they remain silent about their feelings in order to maintain their professional boundaries as employee and employer.

Rio's friend, Daniel, played by Mischa Chandrawinata, visits Rio often. When Daniel sees Anna, he falls in love with her as well. Other maids in the residential complex begin to meddle, and the love triangle soon becomes even more complicated.

== Cast ==
=== Main cast ===
- Celine Evangelista as Anna (19), a beautiful and hard-working young girl. She goes to school and works in Jakarta so she can help her family in her hometown. She works as a maid in Rio's house.
- Dirly as Rio (26), a young and single businessman who is too busy to take care of his own house and hires Anna as his housekeeper.
- Mischa Chandrawinata as Daniel (26), a single and kind yet goofy man who is Rio's best friend.
- Ana Pinem
- Marcella Simon
- Natalie Sarah

=== Supporting cast ===
- Sasha Alexa
- Fatmasury
- Attalarik Syah
- Eeng Saptahadi
- Fanny Fadillah
- Ria Probo
- Purwaniatun
- Yoelitta Palar
- Suheil Fahmi
- Cantik Salshabila
- Aura Kasih
