= Habibie & Ainun =

2012 film by Faozan Rizal

- Theatrical release poster
- Directed by: Faozan Rizal
- Written by: Gina S. Noer; Ifan Adriansyah Ismail
- Produced by: Dhamoo Punjabi; Manoj Punjabi
- Starring: Reza Rahardian; Bunga Citra Lestari; Tio Pakusadewo; Ratna Riantiarno; Mike Lucock; Vita Mariana
- Music by: Andi Rianto
- Production company: MD Pictures
- Distributed by: MD Pictures
- Release date: December 20, 2012
- Running time: 118 minutes
- Country: Indonesia
- Languages: Indonesian; German
- Box office: $17.00 million

Habibie & Ainun is a 2012 Indonesian biographical drama film produced by Manoj Punjabi and Dhamoo Punjabi of MD Pictures. Starring Reza Rahadian, Bunga Citra Lestari and Tio Pakusadewo, the film is based on the memoir written by the 3rd President of the Republic of Indonesia, B. J. Habibie about his wife, Hasri Ainun Habibie, also named "Habibie and Ainun".

The film, released on 20 December 2012, drew the largest theatrical audience to date in Indonesian cinema history with 4.7 million viewers. It also became MD Pictures' highest grossing film produced to date.

The film was followed by a prequel, Rudy Habibie in 2016, with Rahadian reprising his role.

== Plot ==
In 1953 at her school in Bandung, Hasri Ainun Besari is matched by a teacher with Bacharuddin Jusuf "Rudy" Habibie for their intelligence, infatuating Rudy. In 1962, when accompanying his brother for an appointment, he meets Ainun, now a physician. They begin to fall in love. Rudy says he plans to finish college in Aachen, Germany, and then return to Indonesia to revolutionize his home country. He proposes to Ainun, who accepts, and they marry and move to Aachen.

While Rudy works at a train company, Ainun is pregnant. The couple move to Hamburg after the birth of their son, Ilham Akbar Habibie. Earning a Doctor of Engineering, Rudy proposes an Indonesian-made aircraft to the Indonesian Aircraft Industry Commando, but they express unreadiness. Ainun cheers him up by revealing a second baby, Thareq Kemal Habibie, but hides her newfound ovarian cancer. Missing the hospital environment, she reprises her role as a physician. Meanwhile, Ibnu Sutowo supports Rudy and brings him to Jakarta, where he has organized an engineering team. Rudy also becomes a cabinet minister. His blueprint of IPTN N-250 is approved by President Suharto, and manufacturing begins. Despite initial sentiments, the locals and the press praise its maiden flight on 10 August 1995.

External videos
- Video of the maiden flight of IPTN N-250 on YouTube, also seen in the film (5m 44s)

Ainun requests a honeymoon, but it is delayed by Rudy's oath as Vice President, which causes him to be sleep deprived. Following the 1997 Asian financial crisis and the May 1998 riots, Suharto resigns, and Rudy becomes President. His initiation of the Reform era is criticized, and he is later accused of corruption. Ainun learns that her cancer is worsening, but continues hiding it. A year into his presidency, Rudy realizes that the burden of his occupation is self-detrimental and resigns. The N-250 is abandoned following the crisis, exacerbated with the public's apathy on its possibility of developing local mobility. Rudy and Ainun later go on the honeymoon.

Rudy discovers that Ainun's cancer reached Stage IV, prompting him to fly with his family to Munich, where Ainun is hospitalized at the Universitätsklinikum Großhadern. Although surgery is successful, the cells have divided and spread; Rudy still believes Ainun will be cured, but the doctor gives no guarantee. Hopeless, Ainun's friend suggest that her funeral be organized; Rudy confronts her as it nears their marriage's 48th anniversary. Ainun dies on 22 May 2010. Rudy then revisits Ainun's home, where he imagines her interacting. The film ends with a video of elderly Habibie visiting Ainun's grave, saying he will forever cherish memories with her.

== Cast ==
- Bunga Citra Lestari as Hasri Ainun Habibie
- Reza Rahadian as B. J. Habibie
- Marsha Natika as young Ainun
- Esa Sigit as young Habibie
- Mike Lucock as Ilham Akbar Habibie
- Christoffer Nelwan as Thareq Kemal Habibie
- Ratna Riantiarno as R. A. Tuti Marini Puspowardojo
- Tio Pakusadewo as Suharto

== Release ==
This film was launched on 20 December 2012, with its gala screening attended by then-President of Republic of Indonesia Susilo Bambang Yudhoyono along with then-Governor of Jakarta and future-President Joko Widodo as well as Habibie himself.
