= My Stupid Boss =

- Theatrical release poster
- Directed by: Upi Avianto
- Based on: My Stupid Boss by Chaos@Work
- Produced by: Frederica
- Starring: Reza Rahadian; Bunga Citra Lestari; Alex Abbad; Bront Palarae; Chew Kin Wah; Atikah Suhaime
- Cinematography: Muhammad Firdaus
- Edited by: Wawan I. Wibowo
- Music by: Aghi Narottama
- Production company: Falcon Pictures
- Distributed by: Falcon Pictures
- Release date: May 19, 2016 (Indonesia)
- Running time: 108 minutes
- Countries: Indonesia; Malaysia
- Languages: Indonesian; Malay; English
- Box office: $10.02 million

My Stupid Boss is a 2016 Indonesian comedy film directed and written by Upi Avianto based on a four-part novel series of the same name by Chaos@Work. The film stars Reza Rahadian, Bunga Citra Lestari, Alex Abbad, Chew Kin Wah, Atikah Suhaime and Bront Palarae as workers of a company led by a stupid and weird boss known simply as "Bossman". The film was released simultaneously in Indonesia, Malaysia, Singapore and Brunei on 19 May 2016 by Falcon Pictures and Skop Productions.

== Plot ==
Indonesian couple Diana and Dika reside in an apartment in Kuala Lumpur. Feeling dissatisfied with spending most of her time at home, Diana accepts a job interview for an administrative position offered by “Bossman,” one of Dika's friends from their time studying in California. Upon arriving for the interview, Diana observes that many employees harbor negative opinions of Bossman, and she soon develops a similar impression. Although wealthy, Bossman is perceived by his staff as eccentric, entitled, and inattentive to workplace issues, including the office's poor organizational structure and a malfunctioning air conditioner that he refuses to repair.

As Diana's frustration grows, she considers resigning and frequently expresses her irritation to Dika, who dismisses her concerns by insisting that Bossman's behavior is simply part of his personality. In response, Diana and several coworkers—Norah Sikin, Mr. Kho, Azhari, and Adrian—engage in acts of retaliation intended to inconvenience Bossman, including repeatedly calling him while he is sleeping and reporting unpaid bills to the landlord. When Bossman attempts to evade the landlord, the employees celebrate their actions.

Encouraged by Dika to address the situation more constructively, Diana prepares to resign. Before she does so, Bossman takes her to visit an orphanage and recounts an encounter that inspired him: witnessing a child with polio assisting a blind companion while living in poor conditions. He expresses his intention to renovate the orphanage and improve the children's living environment. This revelation leads Diana and her coworkers to reconsider their perception of him, recognizing a more compassionate side to his character.

Later, during his birthday celebration, Bossman promises to treat the staff to lunch. However, when reminded of the plan, he retracts the offer and instructs them to return to work, once again frustrating the employees.

== Production ==
My Stupid Boss was adapted to screenplay from a story written by Chaos@work. Upi Avianto wrote the screenplay from the original version for a duration of 6 months and directed the film. The film was released on 19 May 2016 by Falcon Pictures in Indonesia, Malaysia, Singapore, and Brunei.

== Cast ==
- Reza Rahadian as Bossman
- Bunga Citra Lestari as Diana
- Alex Abbad as Dika
- Bront Palarae as Adrian
- Chew Kin Wah as Mr. Kho
- Atikah Suhaime as Norasikin
- Iskandar Zulkarnain as Azhari
- Melissa Karim as Bossman's Wife
- Nadiya Nisaa as Siti
- Sharmaine Othman as Vivian
- Sherry Alhadad as Azizah
- Richard Oh as Mr. Chia
- Ting Tan as Pipe Shop Boss

== Reception ==
On the 15th day after release, My Stupid Boss reached 2,298,000 viewers. On 5 July 2016, The Jakarta Post published a list of "5 most watched movies from the last decade" created by filmindonesia.or.id that includes My Stupid Boss.
