= List of Indonesia's Next Top Model episodes =

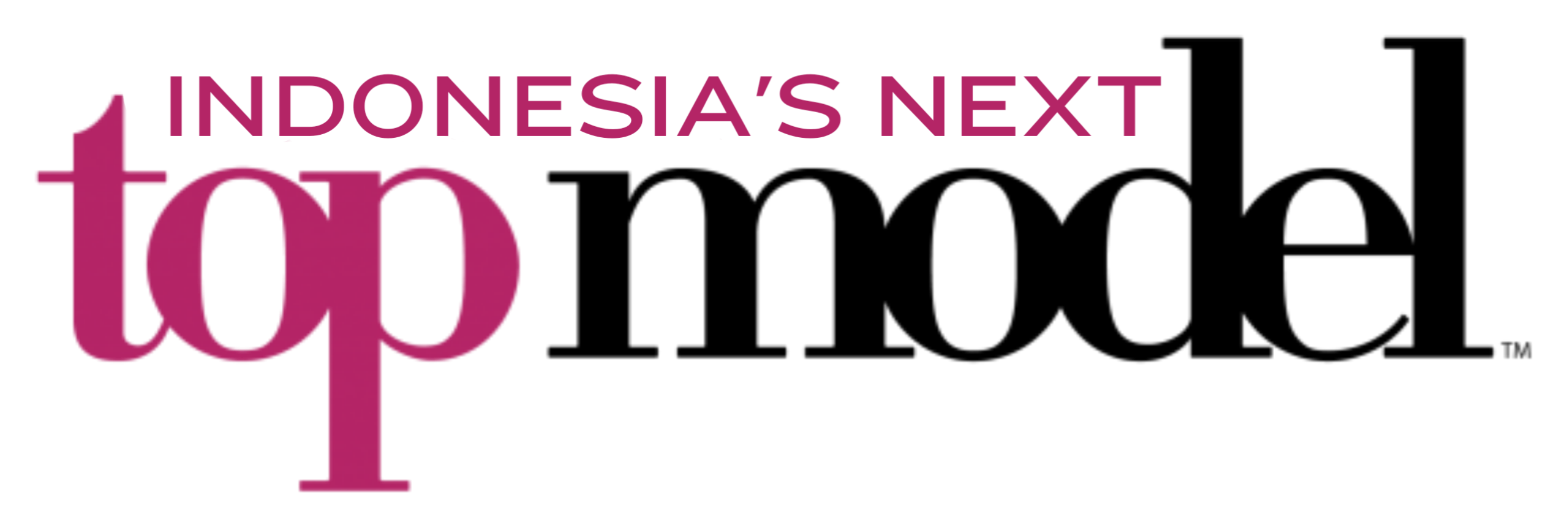

Indonesia's Next Top Model (abbreviated as INTM) is an Indonesian reality television series based on Tyra Banks' America's Next Top Model, which features a group of young women who compete for the title of "Indonesia's Next Top Model" and a chance to begin their career in the modeling industry. The series began to air on NET. starting from November 28, 2020.

As of March 26, 2023, 120 episodes of Indonesia's Next Top Model have aired.

== Series overview ==
Season	Presenter	Episodes	Originally released		
Season	Presenter	Episodes	First released	Last released	Network
1	Luna Maya	40	November 28, 2020	April 9, 2021	NET.
2	Luna Maya	40	November 4, 2021	March 18, 2022	NET.
3	Luna Maya	40	November 5, 2022	March 26, 2023	NET.

== Episodes ==
=== Cycle 1 (2020) ===
No. overall	No. in season	Title	Original release date
1–2	1–2	"The Girl Who Climbs to the Top"	28 November 2020 29 November 2020
3–4	3–4	"The Girl Who Is in Top Speed"	5 December 2020 6 December 2020
5–6	5–6	"The Girl Who Rocks at Phinisi"	12 December 2020 13 December 2020
7–8	7–8	"The Girl Who Skates to Standout"	19 December 2020 20 December 2020
9–10	9–10	"The Girl Who Is on Fire"	26 December 2020 27 December 2020
11–12	11–12	"The Girl Who Gets Twisted"	2 January 2021 3 January 2021
13–14	13–14	"The Girl Who Freezes and Drowns"	7 January 2021 8 January 2021
15–16	15–16	"The Girl Who Finally Speaks Up"	14 January 2021 15 January 2021
17–18	17–18	"The Girl Who Is Stuck in the Racecourse"	21 January 2021 22 January 2021
19–20	19–20	"The Girl Who Has Too Much Energy"	28 January 2021 29 January 2021
21–22	21–22	"The Girl Who Flies High in the Sky"	4 February 2021 5 February 2021
23–24	23–24	"The Girl Who Gets a Big Catch"	11 February 2021 12 February 2021
25–26	25–26	"The Girl Who Makes the Blue Jeans Club"	20 February 2021 21 February 2021
27–28	27–28	"The Girl Who Is a Time Bomb"	27 February 2021 28 February 2021
29–30	29–30	"The Girl Who Steals the Spotlight"	6 March 2021 7 March 2021
31–32	31–32	"The Girl Who Gets Praised by Tyra"	13 March 2021 14 March 2021
33–34	33–34	"The Girl Who Makes Everyone Emotional"	18 March 2021 19 March 2021
35–36	35–36	"The Girl Who Embraces Their Dark Side"	25 March 2021 26 March 2021
37–38	37–38	"The Girl Who Got a Bad Salsa"	1 April 2021 2 April 2021
39–40	39–40	"The First Indonesia's Next Top Model is..."	8 April 2021 9 April 2021

=== Cycle 2 (2021) ===
No. overall	No. in season	Title	Original release date
41–42	1–2	"The Girl Who Is a Queen Bee"	4 November 2021 5 November 2021
43–44	3–4	"The Girl Who Is Not Fit Enough"	11 November 2021 12 November 2021
45–46	5–6	"The Girl Whose String Got Pulled"	18 November 2021 19 November 2021
47–48	7–8	"The Girl Who Owns a New Look"	25 November 2021 26 November 2021
49–50	9–10	"The Girl, the Ballerina, and the Tragedy Behind It"	2 December 2021 3 December 2021
51–52	11–12	"The Girl Who Releases Their Alter Ego"	9 December 2021 10 December 2021
53–54	13–14	"The Girl Who Owns the Spinning Wheel"	16 December 2021 17 December 2021
55–56	15–16	"The Girl Who Is in a Circius Show"	23 December 2021 24 December 2021
57–58	17–18	"The Girl Who Shows Her Inner Wild Side"	30 December 2021 31 December 2021
59–60	19–20	"The Girl Who Gets up and Redeems Herself"	6 January 2022 7 January 2022
61–62	21–22	"The Girl Who Plays Chicken"	13 January 2022 14 January 2022
63–64	23–24	"The Girl Who Sets a Trap"	20 January 2022 21 January 2022
65–66	25–26	"The Girl Who Nearly Collapsed"	27 January 2022 28 January 2022
67–68	27–28	"The Girl/s Who Made a Comeback"	3 February 2022 4 February 2022
69–70	29–30	"The Girl Who Becomes Art in Motion"	10 February 2022 11 February 2022
71–72	31–32	"The Girl Who Falls in Love Again"	17 February 2022 18 February 2022
73–74	33–34	"The Girl Who Is Left Hanging"	24 February 2022 25 February 2022
75–76	35–36	"The Fighter Girl Comes Over Rush"	3 March 2022 4 March 2022
77–78	37–38	"The Last Three Girls Standing"	10 March 2022 11 March 2022
79–80	39–40	"Which Girl is Indonesia's Next Top Model ?"	17 March 2022 18 March 2022

=== Cycle 3 (2022) ===
No. overall	No. in season	Title	Original release date
81–82	1–2	"Which Girl Is a Daredevil?"	5 November 2022 6 November 2022
83–84	3–4	"Which Girl Dominates the Field?"	12 November 2022 13 November 2022
85–86	5–6	"Which Girl Gets Checkmated?"	19 November 2022 20 November 2022
87–88	7–8	"Which Girl Can Work the Room?"	26 November 2022 27 November 2022
89–90	9–10	"Which Girl Gets Lost in the Woods?"	3 December 2022 4 December 2022
91–92	11–12	"Which Girl Can Stand the Limelight?"	10 December 2022 11 December 2022
93–94	13–14	"Which Girl Turns Fear into Advantage?"	17 December 2022 18 December 2022
95–96	15–16	"Which Girl Shoots a Glam Dunk?"	24 December 2022 25 December 2022
97–98	17–18	"Which Girl Is Having a Great Tea Time?"	7 January 2023 8 January 2023
99–100	19–20	"Which Girl Gets Booted Out of the Camp?"	14 January 2023 15 January 2023
101–102	21–22	"Which Girls Get Their Second Chance?"	21 January 2023 22 January 2023
103–104	23–24	"Which Girl Is Free Falling?"	28 January 2023 29 January 2023
105–106	25–26	"Which Girl Gets Dragged Away?"	4 February 2023 5 February 2023
107–108	27–28	"Which Girl Is in a Fairytale Story?"	11 February 2023 12 February 2023
109–110	29–30	"Which Girl Doubts Herself?"	18 February 2023 19 February 2023
111–112	31–32	"Which Girl Is Ready to Fly?"	25 February 2023 26 February 2023
113–114	33–34	"Which Girl Will Go Beyond Limits?"	4 March 2023 5 March 2023
115–116	35–36	"Which Girl Dances Her Way to the Top?"	11 March 2023 12 March 2023
117–118	37–38	"Which Girl Exudes a Star Aura?"	18 March 2023 19 March 2023
119–120	39–40	"Which Girl Is Top Model Worthy?"	25 March 2023 26 March 2023
