= Danella Ilene =

Indonesian model (born 1997)

- Born: February 20, 1997 (age 29); Bali, Indonesia
- Modeling information
- Height: 5 ft 8 in (1.73 m)
- Hair color: Black
- Eye color: Brown

Danella Ilene Kurniawan (born February 20, 1997) is an Indonesian fashion model. She is best known for winning the first cycle of Indonesia's Next Top Model.

== Early life and education ==
Danella Ilene Kurniawan was born on February 20, 1996, in Bali to sociology teacher Kurniawan Kristiandi and Rosana Rosadiama, both are of Chinese descent. Ilene is the youngest of three children and has two older sisters. Despite being born in Bali, Ilene spent her childhood and teenage years in Bandung.

In 2015, she started attending Christian University of Indonesia, formerly pursuing a bachelor's degree in English Literature before transferring to the English Language program the following year. She completed her studies in 2019.

== Indonesia's Next Top Model ==
In 2020, Ilene appeared in the first cycle of the NET. reality television show Indonesia's Next Top Model, in which she competed against fifteen other aspiring models. Throughout the cycle, Ilene received five first call-outs, including :

- "Splashes of Color" photoshoot (Top 12, episode 15), where she represented the color green
- "Aerial Hoop" photoshoot (Top 5, episode 27), representing the character of a color of Ellips Hair Vitamin products
- "Black Angel" photoshoot (Top 4, episode 35), with Ellips Hair Vitamin
- "The Matador" TVC (Top 3, episode 37) with Honda HR-V, where it was divided into three scenes; beauty pose, Salsa Dance, and Matador action
- "Avant-garde Fashion" photoshoot (Top 2, episode 39) at Kawah Putih.

She would eventually beat fellow competitor Gea Lim in the cycle finale, becoming the first ever winner of Indonesia's Next Top Model.

Ilene's name became more widely known after the mental health controversy, where in one episode she shared that she had experienced depression and was diagnosed with an eating disorder, only to receive comments from Deddy Corbuzier and Luna Maya that were considered insensitive to the issue of mental health.
