= Indonesia's Next Top Model season 2 =

Season of television series

Indonesia's Next Top Model
- Season 2
- Indonesia's Next Top Model (cycle 2) cast
- Judges: Luna Maya; Panca Makmun; Ivan Gunawan; Ayu Gani
- No. of contestants: 18
- Winner: Sarah Gabriella Tumiwa
- No. of episodes: 40

Release
- Original network: NET.
- Original release: 4 November 2021 – 18 March 2022

Season chronology
- ← Previous; Season 1 Next → Season 3

The second cycle of Indonesia's Next Top Model aired weekly on Indonesian private broadcaster NET. starting November 4, 2021. This cycle, the number of contestants increased, making the total of 18 contestants. Luna Maya and Panca Makmun returned as host and resident judge, while Deddy Corbuzier and Patricia Gouw were replaced by guest judge and mentor from the first cycle, Ivan Gunawan and Ayu Gani. This cycle's prizes are cash amounting to hundreds of millions of Rupiahs, an all new Suzuki XL7 car unit, as well as Samsung Galaxy Z Flip 3 5G which also served as the official partner for this cycle.

This cycle was filmed under strict health protocols as it was produced during the COVID-19 pandemic. While the previous cycle featured a local destination, this cycle didn't feature any local nor international destination. However, the grandfinalists took a trip to Pahawang Island of Lampung during the final episode.

The winner of the competition was 21-year-old Sarah Gabriella Tumiwa, from Jakarta.

== Format changes ==
In this cycle, the contestants have to split into two groups in each photoshoot, in which each model has both an individual and a group shot with their assigned team. The contestants on the team with the best group photo on panel are automatically immune from elimination regardless of their individual photo's result, while one contestant of the losing team will be eliminated. In addition, following the format of Germany's Next Top Model, the panel challenge in front of the judges in this cycle is almost always replaced by a runway challenge. Based on the individual and group photos and the runway challenge, the judges decide who is safe and who is eliminated from the competition. The group system, however, is dismissed after the comeback episode as the competition reached the final seven, so that only individual photos and runway challenge count in determining who is eliminated from the competition.

== Cast ==
=== Contestants ===
(Ages stated are at start of contest)

| Contestant | Age | Height | Hometown | Finish | Place |
|---|---|---|---|---|---|
| Gisela Martha | 22 | 1.76 m (5 ft 9 1/2 in) | Surabaya | Episode 2 | 18 |
| Ayu Nisa Nurfitri | 27 | 1.73 m (5 ft 8 in) | Yogyakarta | Episode 4 | 17 |
| Aziza Alhafiz | 22 | 1.68 m (5 ft 6 in) | Palembang | Episode 6 | 16 |
| Aurel Vida Oriana | 17 | 1.70 m (5 ft 7 in) | Bandung | Episode 8 | 15 |
| Maria 'Yolanda' Wenur | 24 | 1.68 m (5 ft 6 in) | Surabaya | Episode 12 | 14-13 |
| Marissa Lorylin Widjaja | 19 | 1.72 m (5 ft 7 1/2 in) | Bali | Episode 12 | 14-13 |
| Sitta Novita | 27 | 1.76 m (5 ft 9 1/2 in) | Jakarta | Episode 14 | 12 |
| Tiffany Zhu Mei-Ying | 24 | 1.72 m (5 ft 7 1/2 in) | Medan | Episode 16 | 11 |
| Ni Made 'Chainia' Lovera Lilipaly | 17 | 1.73 m (5 ft 8 in) | Surabaya | Episode 18 | 10 |
| Nita Oktarina Pangestu | 22 | 1.73 m (5 ft 8 in) | Bandung | Episode 20 | 9 |
| Alfirda ' Alfi' Alifia | 22 | 1.78 m (5 ft 10 in) | Jakarta | Episode 24 | 8 |
| Maria Christina 'Evanny' Wityo | 24 | 1.77 m (5 ft 9 1/2 in) | Jakarta | Episode 30 | 7 |
| Tiffany Regina 'Jolie' Iskandar | 27 | 1.68 m (5 ft 6 in) | Jakarta | Episode 32 | 6 |
| Audya Ananta | 22 | 1.71 m (5 ft 7 1/2 in) | Surabaya | Episode 34 | 5 |
| Peace Jemima Okechukwu Nnatuanya | 18 | 1.68 m (5 ft 6 in) | Jakarta | Episode 36 | 4 |
| Faradina Amalia | 28 | 1.79 m (5 ft 10 1/2 in) | Yogyakarta | Episode 38 | 3 |
| Helen Hiu | 21 | 1.70 m (5 ft 7 in) | Jakarta | Episode 40 | 2 |
| Sarah Gabriella Tumiwa | 21 | 1.75 m (5 ft 9 in) | Jakarta | Episode 40 | 1 |

=== Judges ===
- Luna Maya (host)
- Panca Makmun
- Ivan Gunawan
- Ayu Gani

== Episodes ==
| No. overall | No. in season | Title | Original release date |
|---|---|---|---|
| 41–42 | 1–2 | "The Girl Who Is a Queen Bee" | 4 November 2021 5 November 2021 |
This season started with 18 girls who came into their new model house and were welcomed by Luna and Panca. Immediately afterward, they faced their first challenge which was a "Casting Call", Chainia and Jolie were declared winners and had the advantage to choose seven other girls, became a team, and looked at references for their very first photo shoot. Before the photo shoot, Luna announced that there's a new format of the photo shoot which the models had to split into two groups, each model had a solo and group shot with their team, and if their team doesn't win against the other, their position won't be safe in the next elimination. For the first week, the models had to pose with bees and pieces of jewelry. At the panel, Luna announced one new format in this cycle, which was every week, the models had to face runway challenge before the judging started, by the end of the panel, the judges will evaluate both runway and photo shoot performances, and decided who will be eliminated. For the first runway, the models had to walk with Jember Fashion Carnival's gowns and headpieces. The judges decided that the winning team of the group photo shoot was Sitta's team, and Jolie was crowned best photo of the week. Gisela and Nita landed on the bottom two, and Luna handed the last photo to Nita, making Gisela the first contestant to get eliminated in this cycle.: Featured photographer: Zaky Akbar; Special guest: Bubah Alfian
| 43–44 | 3–4 | "The Girl Who Is Not Fit Enough" | 11 November 2021 12 November 2021 |
After Gisela's elimination, the girls went back to their model house, where they found Gisela's last messages to other models. The next day, Alfi argued with Nita, saying that Nita accused Alfi about her fault on the group photo shoot on last panel and portrayed her in the wrong way. Challenge for this week was "Do Your Own Hair", which the models were split into two group, and have to braid one of the model's hair in their group, following the photo of intricate braids' hairstyle Panca gave to them. Once again, Jolie and her team won and got prizes from Babyliss Paris, while Alfi, as the leader of the losing team, chose Ayu and Aurel to get punishment which was a time reducement for their next photo shoot. Arriving on set, the models had to pose while doing body flip in mid air. Peace, Audya, and some other models did surprisingly well, but Ayu, Aurel, Marissa, Yolanda, and Sitta struggled because they weren't flexible enough, in addition to their fear of heights. At the panel, the judges gave Jolie's team another win for their group photo shoot, saving her group from elimination. For this week's runway, the models had to walk industrial themed fashion. Peace became Model of the Week by getting her first call-out, while Sitta and Ayu landed on bottom two. The judges decided to save Sitta once again, eliminating Ayu.: Featured photographer: Putra Djohan; Special guests: Ayushita, Opick Mano
| 45–46 | 5–6 | "The Girl Whose String Got Pulled" | 18 November 2021 19 November 2021 |
The models went back to their house to hear Ayu's farewell messages. The next day, Jolie was confronted by almost everyone in the model house, mainly Sarah, because of her fake attitude behind the shot and while on the panel, saying that she had to drag other models down first to get her top position every week. The models were awakened by Gani the next morning to do the weekly challenge, which was "Question with Brand Ambassador", and they were divided into two teams, with Peace as the leader of the Beauty Influencer Team and Yolanda as leader of Workout Team. Peace won her first challenge with her team and got sets of clothes also pose preferences for their next runway. The next day, the models were taken into an abandoned house and had to pose as marionettes. At the weekly panel, the girls had to walk a wind-themed runway wearing long dresses. The judges evaluated both teams' group photos and decided to give immunity to Peace's team, saving her group from elimination. Faradina excelled and became Model of the Week, while Alfi and Aziza landed on the bottom two. Luna gave one more chance to Alfi, and Aziza became the third model that went home.: Featured photographer: Hardi Budi; Special guests: Vannico Soekarno
| 47–48 | 7–8 | "The Girl Who Owns a New Look" | 25 November 2021 26 November 2021 |
The final fifteen met with one of Indonesia's famous hairstylist, Rudy Hadisuwarno, and received their new looks as they faced makeovers, many of them were satisfied with it. The models had a day off from mini-challenge, and immediately straight went to the location of their very first fashion video shoot. As the previous Model of the Week, Faradina became a team leader and chose Chania, Sitta, Evanny, Sarah, Helen, Audya, and surprisingly Jolie to join her team, while Tiffany became the second team's leader. Team Tiffany did overally better on the group fashion film than Team Faradina, which made Sitta upset and had debates with Faradina after they went home. At the panel, the judges were pleased with Team Faradina's group fashion film, thus saving her group from elimination. This week's runway challenge was to be unique, quirky, and iconic while showcasing Samsung Galaxy Z Flip 3 5G. Faradina maintained her position as she became Model of the Week in two consecutive weeks, while Marissa and Aurel landed on the bottom two for the very first time, and Aurel's time ran out as she became the fourth model that went home.: Special guests: Rudy Hadisuwarno, Bubah Alfian
| 49–50 | 9–10 | "The Girl, the Ballerina, and the Tragedy Behind It" | 2 December 2021 3 December 2021 |
After Aurel's elimination, the final fourteen were shocked to know that each model's bed was moved to another room, making new roommates to each other. The models were then introduced to a professional ballet dancer, Nadia Mulyono, on the next day for their "Speak Through Movement" ballet choreography challenge at Jakarta Art Building. Team Faradina consisted of Evanny, Peace, Sitta, Tiffany, Yolanda, and Audya, while Team Sarah consisted of Alfi, Helen, Nita, Chainia, Jolie, and Marissa. While Nadia were evaluating both teams, Alfi suddenly collapsed and Sarah's foot's skin were ripped off due to the practice, resulting both girl to be taken to near medical center. Team Faradina won again and got sunglasses by Gucci as prizes for each model. This week, following the challenge before, the models had to face a movement classical ballet photo shoot while throwing white powder. At the panel, Sarah brought her team to a victory and safe from elimination. Audya declared as Model of the Week, while Evanny and Faradina landed on bottom two for the first time. Luna gave a second chance to both models, thus there was no elimination.: Featured photographer: Putra Djohan; Special guests: Nadia Mulyono, Dave Hendrik
| 51–52 | 11–12 | "The Girl Who Releases Their Alter Ego" | 9 December 2021 10 December 2021 |
Back to the model house, Yolanda let out her anger to Jolie because she thought that Jolie brought Yolanda and Alfie into conflict intentionally. The next day, the final fourteen met with Indonesian actress, Olga Lydia, as a mentor to help them in a "Draw Your Alter Ego" challenge, whereas they had to impersonate and mimick a celebrity or famous character such as Ariana Grande, Hua Mulan, and others. Audya, as the previous Model of the Week, chose Peace, Jolie, Tiffany, Chainia, Nita, and Sarah to join her team, while Helen were picked as the other team's leader. Team Audya won the challenge and got a dinner set for all the members, in addition to that, they had a chance to take a look at the next photo shoot's pose preferences. For this week's photo shoot, the girls had to pose laying on billboard set, creating a twofold illusion perspective while advertising Samsung Galaxy Z Flip 3 5G. Cathy Sharon appeared as a guest judge on panel due to Ivan Gunawan's absence. Audya led her team to victory, and safe from the elimination. The girls then had to walk a secret agent-themed runway. Model of the Week was Nita, while Yolanda and Marissa landed on bottom two. Luna surprisingly announced that both of them were going home, showing an empty photograph on her hand.: Featured photographer: Winston Gomez; Special guests: Olga Lydia, Selvia Gofar, Cathy Sharon
| 53–54 | 13–14 | "The Girl Who Owns the Spinning Wheel" | 16 December 2021 17 December 2021 |
After a shocking double elimination last week, the final twelve learned that anything could happen in this competition and need to be more focus. The models then met with Indonesian fashion creator, Ayla Dimitri, to help them on the next minor challenge. Teams for this week were Evanny, Audya, Peace, Helen, Alfi, and Nita, while the other team consisted of Sitta, Jolie, Tiffany, Chainia, Faradina, and Sarah. As the previous Model of the Week, Nita got a chance to trade her team, and she took that chance with Sitta. The girls had to make a one minute "Fashion Reels" video with mix and match clothes. Team Nita won and had an advantage for the next challenge as a prize. In addition to that, she got a chance among with other two girls to call their families or other relatives at the confession room. The next day, Gani was joined by Indonesian actress, Wulan Guritno, to guide the twelve models in their very first TV commercial who took place in different kind of daily activity sets. At the panel, the judges stated that none of both team were good enough to be declared as best performance, but since Nita's team did a slightly better commercial, she and her team were safe to the next round. Later on, the models had to walk a musical dance fashion show with a rotator on the edge of the runway, which the models had to keep their balance on it featuring performance of Yura Yunita's "Hoolala". Helen excelled and became Model of the Week for the first time, while Sitta and Tiffany became the bottom two. Luna gave another chance to Tiffany, eliminating Sitta.: Special guests: Alya Dimitri, Wulan Guritno, Yura Yunita
| 55–56 | 15–16 | "The Girl Who Is in a Circius Show" | 23 December 2021 24 December 2021 |
After Sitta's department, the model house felt like a little more quiet. The next morning, the models started to hear a buzzer that act as a sign to their next minor challenge which titled "Be A Mannequin". They were given thirty minutes to dress up and posed as a group at the given platform in four rounds of ten minutes. Before that, Helen as the previous Model of the Week, got a chance to choose her team, and she joined Nita, Sarah, Alfi, Evanny, Faradina, while Chainia were picked as the second team's leader. Top 5 finalists from the first cycle Devina, Gea, and Yumi made a surprise visit with Panca Makmun to evaluate the challenge. Later on, Helen brought her team to victory, and got a staycation prize with her team. The next day, the final eleven took on an avant garde-themed photo shoot while hanging on a swing. At the panel, Helen's group photo were deemed better than Chainia's group, immuning her team from elimination. Then, the models had to walk a circus-themed runway while doing hand tricks. Sarah received her first best performance, becoming Model of the Week. Tiffany and Chainia landed on bottom two, and with being on the bottom twice in a row, Tiffany was eliminated.: Featured photographer: Hardi Budi; Special guests: Devina Bertha, Galatia Gea Amanda, Yumi Kwandy
| 57–58 | 17–18 | "The Girl Who Shows Her Inner Wild Side" | 30 December 2021 31 December 2021 |
The models went back to their house as top ten of this cycle and got a chance to evaluate each other's photograph. The next day, Luna Mail arrived with an announcement for their next minor challenge, "Trekking in Sentul", which was a physical training in rainforest area consisting of tracking and outbound game's stops. Team Sarah originally consisted of herself, Jolie, Faradina, Alfi, and Helen, but as the previous Model of the Week, she had a privilege to change one of her members, and she traded Alfi with Audya. In addition to that, she chose Peace as the other team's leader, with members consisting of Evanny, Chainia, Nita, and Alfi. Immediately after Team Peace won the challenge, the girls met with Panca Makmun, Ayu Gani, and photographer Ila Schaffer and had a wild-themed photo shoot while wearing tribal headpieces and wardrobes that they chose before in the challenge. At judging panel, Sarah's group delivered a stunning group shot which captured the wild and tribal theme that the judges wanted, thus secured her team members to top nine. Before Team Peace's evaluation, the top ten walked a circuit / street race-themed runway. Luna decided to place all of Peace's teammates in a danger position of elimination this week since the judges felt that no one from her team delivered a good photograph. Jolie claimed her throne again, becoming Model of the Week for the second time, followed by Faradina, who had a close gap to Jolie. Peace landed on bottom two for the first time with Chainia, but Luna still gave a chance to her, placing Chainia on tenth place of this cycle.: Featured photographer: Ila Schaffer; Special guests: Gangga Kusuma, Rizky Febian
| 59–60 | 19–20 | "The Girl Who Gets up and Redeems Herself" | 6 January 2022 7 January 2022 |
Peace and Evanny got into an intense debate at the model house about Peace's lack of attitude as a team leader last week. The next day, the top nine met with famous Indonesian designer, Harry Halim, and had to impress him in "The Video Comp Card" challenge, whereas they had to give two casting looks : casual and glam, in the video. Team Jolie were consisted of herself, Evanny, Nita, Audya, and Helen, and as the previous Model of the Week, she chose Peace again to be the other team's leader, hoping that she won't do well, based on her experience last week. Her team were consisted of Faradina, Sarah, and Alfi. Peace and her team members got the most booked by Harry, thus, her team won over Jolie's. Arriving on set, the girls were welcomed by a humanoid robot, whereas they have to channel their futuristic side with it in the photo, which a lot of models struggled, specially Faradina, who went completely blank on set. Then, the top nine presented modern Japanese clothes and styles on a runway walk before the judges made decision for elimination. The judges applaud Team Peace as her team delivered a remarkable group shot and captured the robot expressions, which was an absolute win comparing to the other team's photo, and Peace once again redeemed herself as a team leader, securing her team for the next week. Despite that, Evanny became Model of the Week for the first time, with Helen narrowly misses landing in the bottom, leaving Jolie and Nita up for elimination. Luna gave the last photo to Jolie, sending Nita home.: Featured photographer: Narya Abhimata; Special guests: Harry Halim
| 61–62 | 21–22 | "The Girl Who Plays Chicken" | 13 January 2022 14 January 2022 |
After Nita's elimination, there was a rumour spreading around the model house that the upper bunk bed was cursed because if one model use it, she would get eliminated. This applied to the eliminations of Aurel, Yolanda, and Nita. The next morning, the models met with Indonesian youtuber and content creators, Chandra Liow, to help them in their "Social Media Campaign" challenge. As previous Model of the Week, Evanny got a chance to decide which team she would led, later on she joined Sarah, Jolie, and Alfi, becoming one team, while Faradina, Peace, Helen, and Audya became another team. After a slight gap, Team Evanny won the challenge and got prizes such as a chance to go out, shopping, and got to choose the theme for their next runway challenge. The final eight were brought into a paddy field area at the countryside of Tangerang and got introduced to their partners for this photo shoot session which were poultries. Helen got a punishment which was an addition of lamb on her group shot. At the panel, the models walked a garden-themed runway which split into two events : birthday party and a picnic. Team Evanny got a great group shot, immuning her team from elimination, and almost everyone in her group with the exception of Jolie, got superb feedbacks from the judges. Peace were called out first, becoming Model of the Week for the second time, while Audya and Faradina landed on bottom two. Audya received the last photograph, eliminating Faradina, one of the strongest models in the competition.: Featured photographer: Ila Schaffer; Special guests: Chandra Liow
| 63–64 | 23–24 | "The Girl Who Sets a Trap" | 20 January 2022 21 January 2022 |
The models went back home after a shocking elimination of Faradina and decided to relax and played beach ball on the next morning when suddenly Luna Mail came in. On their next minor challenge, the models met with professional pole dancer, Aerial Irene, and the challenge were creating and performing a pole dance choreography, titled "Swing and Dance". Peace automatically became one of the team leader, with Helen, Evanny, and Sarah, and she picked Alfi as the other team leader. But it turns out that Team Alfi won the challenge and her team members got a home treatment prizes. The next day, the top seven were taken to a night bar and met with Kaleb J, which they will become models in his debut single's music video, titled "It's Only Me" that currently went viral. On this week's runway walk, the models got a partner which was legendary singer, Reza Artamevia, and she sang one of her greatest hit, "Berharap Tak Berpisah" (lit. Hope Not to Be Apart), on a 70's disco-themed runway. Helen's performance were praised by the judges both on the music video and her runway walk, becoming Model of the Week, while Jolie and Alfi sunk on the bottom two. As the competition goes near the end, it was Alfi's performance that the judges felt it was flat and she wasn't progressing enough in the competition, thus sending her home.: Special guests: Aerial Irene, Kaleb J, Reza Artamevia, Bubah Alfian
| 65–66 | 25–26 | "The Girl Who Nearly Collapsed" | 27 January 2022 28 January 2022 |
The girls came back as this season's final six and on the next morning, they were surprised by fashion stylist, Bimo Permadi, who made a surprise visit at the model house. They faced "The Styling Duel" challenge with the given concepts. As previous Model of the Week, Helen had an advantage to exchange one of her team member, which she took Sarah and exchanged Peace. Evanny, Sarah, and Helen became one team, while Audya, Jolie, and Peace became the other team with Peace leading once again. Team Helen won the challenge and got a fancy dinner as a prize cooked by season one winner of Junior MasterChef Indonesia, Afaf Syifa. The night before photo shoot, Peace and Jolie had a disagreement. This week's beauty shot took it to another level, which the girls had to pose in the bathtub full of ice that were extremely cold, causing some of them nearly collapsed on the set after the shoot, except for Helen, who delivered a lot of great shots and satisfied Gani, Panca, and the photographer himself. Ivan Gunawan were absent for this week's elimination and were replaced by Indonesian actress and supermodel, Sophia Latjuba. The girls then faced a "twins runway" challenge on mid-judging session, whereas they got paired up with male models. Peace's team won the group shot over Helen's, securing herself, Audya, and Jolie. Helen became Model of the Week for the third time, while Sarah and Evanny landed on bottom two. Luna handed the last photograph to Sarah, eliminating Evanny. But before sending Evanny home, Luna brought back twelve eliminated models and with Evanny joining them, they will fight for a comeback next week.: Featured photographer: Zaky Akbar; Special guests: Bimo Permadi, Afaf Syifa, Sophia Latjuba
| 67–68 | 27–28 | "The Girl/s Who Made a Comeback" | 3 February 2022 4 February 2022 |
Following last week's elimination, the eliminees returned to the model house once again and on the very next day, they had a catwalk entitled "The Jungle Runway" while carrying fruit basket on their head. From that catwalk, the judges decided which eliminees that had a possibility to return. Sitta, Faradina, Chainia, Evanny, and Yolanda were picked by the judges and got a chance to do the photo shoot. On set, the remaining models must pose on stilts in pairs with the eliminees. As previous Model of the Week, Helen led the top five team while Sitta led the eliminees. At the panel, the judges felt that as a group, both groups between top five nor the eliminees delivered great performances, while as individual, some models excelled. Team Helen as the top five won, means there was no elimination from her team. Peace became Model of the Week for the third time and Faradina were called fourth, becoming the first model who made a comeback, followed by Evanny, who were called seventh, after landing on bottom four with Yolanda, Sitta, and Chainia, thus finalizing the new top seven.: Featured photographer: Hardi Budi; Special guests: Cathy Sharon
| 69–70 | 29–30 | "The Girl Who Becomes Art in Motion" | 10 February 2022 11 February 2022 |
This week, the girls got a mail from Ivan Gunawan, who informed that they will undergo a second makeover. Right after that, the top seven met with actress, sport, and life enthusiast, Fanny Ghassani, to keep up their healthy lifestyle and as a "Workout With Me" challenge, whoever did the best, won. But before the challenge, Panca Makmun announced that starting this week, the group system were dismissed and they would compete as individual. Audya won the challenge and got sport equipments as prizes, plus she can take a look of Luna's photo session on the next photo shoot. Present on the set were Luna, Panca, and photographer Hardi Budi whereas the girls had to pose as arts with contemporary dancers as it was in theater. At the panel, the models then had a catwalk which captured the activities of playground area for children. Audya became Model of the Week for the second time, followed closely by Helen and Jolie. Evanny and Sarah landed on bottom two once again, and Luna decided to save Sarah, causing Evanny to leave the competition for the second time immediately after her comeback last week.: Featured photographer: Hardi Budi; Special guests: Diki, Fanny Ghassani, Dave Hendrik
| 71–72 | 31–32 | "The Girl Who Falls in Love Again" | 17 February 2022 18 February 2022 |
After Evanny's elimination, the girls went back to the model house and the next morning, they met with Panca and Gani for a "One Day Vlog" challenge. Audya won the challenge once again and got a privilege behind the set of photo shoot to have a bonding with a male model for this week's romantic photo shoot. This week, the girls were paired up with Indonesian male model and presenter, Kevin Suan, to embody a romantic scene in the city while raining. Helen and Faradina delivered, but Peace got mix to negative critics on the set. At the panel, most of the models got mix feedbacks from the judges. Later on, they also had a wedding-themed runway. Helen became Model of the Week for the fourth time of this season, while Jolie and Peace landed on bottom two. Luna handed the last photo to Peace, eliminating Jolie. On the other hand, Luna got mad at some contestants who cheered knowing that Jolie was going home.: Featured photographer: Putra Djohan; Special guests: Kevin Suan, Mario Ginanjar
| 73–74 | 33–34 | "The Girl Who Is Left Hanging" | 24 February 2022 25 February 2022 |
After Jolie's elimination, Helen got a chance to call her relatives or friends as a prize, and she also chose Sarah to do the same. The next day, the final five went into a "Go See", the first place was Julianto's Boutique, and the second place was Ghea Panggabean's Fashion Studio, which both Sarah and Faradina got booked. The third and final place was Nila Baharuddin's Boutique, and once again Faradina got booked, this time with Helen. On the other hand, neither Peace nor Audya got booked. Thus, since Faradina was cast the most, she won the challenge and got all of the designer's fashion collections. On this week's photo shoot, the final five must hang onto a chandelier and give a glam and elegant posing, which all of them struggled due to their complicated dresses. At the judging panel, the final five walked a stunning ethnical runway of Anne Avantie's traditional kebaya. Faradina were called first for the third time, while Audya and Sarah landed on bottom two, but it was Audya's time to go as this season's fifth place.: Featured photographer: Putra Djohan; Special guests: Julianto, Ghea Panggabean, Nila Baharuddin, Della Dartyan
| 75–76 | 35–36 | "The Fighter Girl Comes Over Rush" | 3 March 2022 4 March 2022 |
As the competition goes near the end, the models started questioning Sarah's performances throughout the last four weeks in the model house. This week's challenge was a boxing-themed "Acting Challenge" with Indonesian actor, Dwi Sasono. Peace had her tongue twisted during her performance, causing her to lose her chance to win the challenge. Instead, Sarah delivered a great performance and won. The next day, the final four were taken into an underground parking and still had to embody fighting scenes in a hero-in-action photo shoot. At the panel, the girls faced a rush-themed runway which they must manage their time to walk forward since there were pendulums hanging and moving above the runway. Sarah earned her second Model of the Week, while Peace went out as third runner up of this season after landing on bottom two with Helen.: Featured photographer: Jacky Suharto; Special guests: Rizky Pradana, Anggipuri, Dwi Sasono, David Hendrawan
| 77–78 | 37–38 | "The Last Three Girls Standing" | 10 March 2022 11 March 2022 |
The semifinalists went back to their model house and saw the last messages from Peace, which made Helen sad since Peace was the moodbooster in the house. On the next evening, the girls faced a "Red Carpet" challenge which they had to do a catwalk and interviews from reporters with their loved ones on red carpet. Sarah was accompanied by her boyfriend, Faradina with her manager friend, while Helen with her bestfriend. Faradina won the challenge, she got jewelries and three extra frames to take a shot in the next photo shoot as prizes. The final three arrived on the photo shoot set and were welcomed by Gani, Panca, and photographer Zaky Akbar. The girls had to portray a dramatic on fire painting with cycle one's winner, Danella Ilene. At the panel, the girls were accompanied by senior supermodels Karenina Anderson, Laura Muljadi, and Renata Kusmanto, and following this week's photo shoot, they had to walk a runway which brought the beauty of an artistic painting. Helen became the first finalist of this season, earning her fifth Model of the Week, followed by Sarah, which placed Faradina as the second runner-up of this season.: Featured photographer: Zaky Akbar; Special guests: Shafira Umm, Asri Welas, Mario Lawalata (Sarah's boyfriend), Angga Irawan (Faradina's agency manager), Reta (Helen's bestfriend), Danella Ilene, Karenina Anderson, Laura Muljadi, Renata Kusmanto
| 79–80 | 39–40 | "Which Girl is Indonesia's Next Top Model ?" | 17 March 2022 18 March 2022 |
The finale began with the last photo shoot which made them travel to Pahawang Island of Lampung. There, they were welcomed by Luna and Panca and got a chance to unpack their bags at the floating cottage. The night before the photo shoot, both models had a dinner with Luna and Panca with some sharing session. The next day, the girls met with one of the best Indonesian photographer, Rio Wibowo, and on their last photo shoot, they had to portray island goddesses. The girls went back to Jakarta for their final runway's preparation and to reunite with both families who came to support. They had a fitting time at Ivan Gunawan's Boutique, since they will wear his clothing designs. At the final runway, Sarah and Helen were joined by some former contestants such as Sitta, Alfi, Evanny, Audya, and Peace. On first look, the models portrayed a theme of "Fallen Angels", while the second look was Ivan Gunawan's "Glam" black and gold traditional designs. They also joined by Indonesian young diva singer, Marion Jola on the runway. Judging started immediately after the catwalk ended. After discussing the finalists' body of work in both photo shoots and runways throughout the cycle, the judges agreed to crown Sarah as Indonesia's Next Top Model, with Helen finishing in second place.: Featured photographer: Rio Wibowo; Special guests: Bubah Alfian, Marion Jola

== Result ==
=== Call-out order ===
| Order | Episodes | | | | | | | | | | | | | | | | | | | |
| Order | 2 | 4 | 6 | 8 | 10 (Note: In Episode 10, Evanny and Faradina landed on bottom two. The judges decided to save both girls, resulting in no elimination.) | 12 | 14 | 16 | 18 | 20 | 22 | 24 | 26 | 28 (Note: At the end of Episode 26, the eliminated models were brought back into the judging room after Evanny's elimination for a chance to return. At the beginning of Episode 27, thirteen eliminees had a runway challenge, where the judges chose five eliminees to go to the next round. In Episode 28, after deliberation, Faradina and Evanny were picked as models to return to the competition.) | 30 | 32 | 34 | 36 | 38 | 40 |
|---|---|---|---|---|---|---|---|---|---|---|---|---|---|---|---|---|---|---|---|---|
| 1 | Jolie | Peace | Faradina | Faradina | Audya | Nita | Helen | Sarah | Jolie | Evanny | Peace | Helen | Helen | Peace | Audya | Helen | Faradina | Sarah | Helen | Sarah |
| 2 | Yolanda | Jolie | Sitta | Nita | Nita | Audya | Sarah | Audya | Faradina | Sarah | Helen | Audya | Jolie | Helen | Helen | Audya | Peace | Faradina | Sarah | Helen |
| 3 | Audya | Nita | Tiffany | Audya | Sarah | Evanny | Audya | Alfi | Sarah | Alfi | Sarah | Sarah | Audya | Audya | Jolie | Sarah | Helen | Helen | Faradina | |
| 4 | Aurel | Evanny | Chainia | Peace | Peace | Jolie | Jolie | Nita | Audya | Faradina | Evanny | Evanny | Peace | Faradina | Peace | Faradina | Sarah | Peace | | |
| 5 | Aziza | Aziza | Nita | Jolie | Marissa | Sarah | Nita | Faradina | Helen | Peace | Alfi | Peace | Sarah | Jolie | Faradina | Peace | Audya | | | |
| 6 | Helen | Sarah | Sarah | Evanny | Tiffany | Alfi | Peace | Peace | Nita | Audya | Jolie | Jolie | Evanny | Sarah | Sarah | Jolie | | | | |
| 7 | Sarah | Faradina | Jolie | Sarah | Chainia | Peace | Alfi | Evanny | Evanny | Helen | Audya | Alfi | | Evanny | Evanny | | | | | |
| 8 | Faradina | Tiffany | Helen | Sitta | Helen | Tiffany | Chainia | Helen | Alfi | Jolie | Faradina | | | | | | | | | |
| 9 | Marissa | Helen | Aurel | Helen | Alfi | Helen | Evanny | Jolie | Peace | Nita | | | | | | | | | | |
| 10 | Tiffany | Aurel | Evanny | Alfi | Yolanda | Sitta | Faradina | Chainia | Chainia | | | | | | | | | | | |
| 11 | Peace | Marissa | Marissa | Chainia | Jolie | Faradina | Tiffany | Tiffany | | | | | | | | | | | | |
| 12 | Chainia | Audya | Peace | Tiffany | Sitta | Chainia | Sitta | | | | | | | | | | | | | |
| 13 | Evanny | Yolanda | Audya | Yolanda | Evanny; Faradina | Marissa; Yolanda | | | | | | | | | | | | | | |
| 14 | Alfi | Chainia | Yolanda | Marissa | Evanny; Faradina | Marissa; Yolanda | | | | | | | | | | | | | | |
| 15 | Ayu | Alfi | Alfi | Aurel | | | | | | | | | | | | | | | | |
| 16 | Sitta | Sitta | Aziza | | | | | | | | | | | | | | | | | |
| 17 | Nita | Ayu | | | | | | | | | | | | | | | | | | |
| 18 | Gisela | | | | | | | | | | | | | | | | | | | |

The contestant was part of a non-elimination bottom two
The contestant was returned the competition
The contestant was eliminated
The contestant won the competition

=== Bottom two / four ===
| Episode | Contestants | | | Eliminated |
|---|---|---|---|---|
| 2 | Nita | & | Gisela | Gisela |
| 4 | Ayu | & | Sitta | Ayu |
| 6 | Alfi | & | Aziza | Aziza |
| 8 | Aurel | & | Marissa | Aurel |
| 10 | Evanny | & | Faradina | None |
| 12 | Yolanda | & | Marissa | Yolanda |
| 12 | Yolanda | & | Marissa | Marissa |
| 14 | Sitta | & | Tiffany | Sitta |
| 16 | Chainia | & | Tiffany | Tiffany |
| 18 | Chainia | & | Peace | Chainia |
| 20 | Jolie | & | Nita | Nita |
| 22 | Faradina | & | Audya | Faradina |
| 24 | Jolie | & | Alfi | Alfi |
| 26 | Sarah | & | Evanny | Evanny |
| 28 (Note: At the beginning of Episode 27, the judges chose five eliminees that had the possibility to return among thirteen. In Episode 28, the five eliminees were judged equally both as a team and individual shoot with the original top five and they were called at the same order alongside the top five, with Faradina were called fourth and Evanny were called seventh after landed on bottom four with Chainia, Sitta, and Yolanda. Thus, becoming two models that allowed to return to the competition.) | Evanny, Chainia, Sitta & Yolanda | | | Yolanda |
| 28 | Evanny, Chainia, Sitta & Yolanda | | | Chainia |
| 28 | Evanny, Chainia, Sitta & Yolanda | | | Sitta |
| 30 | Sarah | & | Evanny | Evanny |
| 32 | Peace | & | Jolie | Jolie |
| 34 | Sarah | & | Audya | Audya |
| 36 | Peace | & | Helen | Peace |
| 38 | Sarah | & | Faradina | Faradina |
| 40 | Helen | & | Sarah | Helen |

The contestant was eliminated after their first time in the bottom two.
The contestant was eliminated after their second time in the bottom two.
The contestant was eliminated after their third time in the bottom two.
The contestant was eliminated after their fourth time in the bottom two.
The contestant was eliminated and placed as the runner-up/s.

=== Average call-out order ===
| Rank by average | Place | Model | Call-out total | Number of call-outs | Call-out average |
|---|---|---|---|---|---|
| 1 | 1 | Sarah | 76 | 20 | 3.80 |
| 2 | 5 | Audya | 72 | 17 | 4.23 |
| 3 | 2 | Helen | 88 | 20 | 4.40 |
| 4 | 6 | Jolie | 80 | 16 | 5.00 |
| 5 | 4 | Peace | 91 | 18 | 5.06 |
| 6 | 3 | Faradina | 90 | 17 | 5.29 |
| 7 | 9 | Nita | 54 | 10 | 5.40 |
| 8 | 7 | Evanny | 101 | 15 | 6.73 |
| 9 | 8 | Alfi | 102 | 12 | 8.50 |
| 10 | 11 | Tiffany | 69 | 8 | 8.63 |
| 11 | 16 | Aziza | 26 | 3 | 8.67 |
| 12 | 15 | Aurel | 38 | 4 | 9.50 |
| 13 | 10 | Chainia | 98 | 10 | 9.80 |
| 14 | 13-14 | Marissa | 64 | 6 | 10.67 |
| 15 | 12 | Sitta | 86 | 8 | 10.75 |
| 16 | 13-14 | Yolanda | 76 | 7 | 10.86 |
| 17 | 17 | Ayu | 32 | 2 | 16.00 |
| 18 | 18 | Gisela | 18 | 1 | 18.00 |

=== Photo / video shoot guide ===
- Episode 1 photo shoot: Extreme shot with bees & jewelries
- Episode 3 photo shoot: Body flipping in mid air
- Episode 5 photo shoot: Stories of Marionettes in an abandoned house
- Episode 7 video shoot: "Brand New Me" fashion film while showcasing new hairstyles
- Episode 9 photo shoot: Classical ballet in white
- Episode 11 photo shoot: Twofold illusion atmosphere on billboard with Samsung Galaxy Z Flip 3 5G
- Episode 13 commercial: "Can You Flip with Us?" in different activity scenes
- Episode 15 photo shoot: Quirky avant-garde on a swing
- Episode 17 photo shoot: Tribal women in the jungle
- Episode 19 photo shoot: Humanoid robot
- Episode 21 photo shoot: High fashion with poultries
- Episode 23 music video: Romantic night bar ambience for Kaleb J's "It's Only Me"
- Episode 25 photo shoot: Icy beauty shoot in a bathtub
- Episode 27 photo shoot: Top 5 vs Eliminees on stilts in pairs
- Episode 29 photo shoot: Theatrical artwork
- Episode 31 photo shoot: Lovers in the rain with Kevin Suan
- Episode 33 photo shoot: Glam and elegant while hanging on chandelier
- Episode 35 photo shoot: Fighting in action
- Episode 37 photo shoot: Dramatical Victorian painting with Danella Ilene
- Episode 39 photo shoot: Goddesses on Pahawang Island

=== Makeovers ===
Following the previous season, after the comeback episode, the remaining seven finalists got a second makeover.

| Contestant | First makeover | Second makeover |
|---|---|---|
| Alfi | Dyed dark brown and trimmed | |
| Audya | Added light brown highlight and messy cut | Trimmed and add curls on the side |
| Aurel | Milk tea brown ombre and wavy shoulder-length cut | |
| Chainia | Dyed jet black and wavy shoulder-length cut | |
| Evanny | Trimmed and dyed soft brown | Boyish short cut and dyed ash grey |
| Faradina | Added various brown highlights and messy chic bob cut | Add curls and ash grey ombre |
| Helen | Short bangs with two layers cut | Trimmed with bowl cut at the front and long at the back |
| Jolie | Dyed dark brown and big wavy curls on the side | Trimmed with brown highlights |
| Marissa | Korean-styled bangs and wavy shoulder-length cut | |
| Nita | Dyed jet black with straight shoulder-length cut and blunt tips | |
| Peace | Dyed hazelnut brown and voluminous weave | Chin-length cut |
| Sarah | Straightened, trimmed, and added silvery brown and white highlights | Bob cut |
| Sitta | Bob cut | |
| Tiffany | Trimmed with wavy weaves | |
| Yolanda | Wavy shoulder-length cut | |

== See also ==
- Indonesia's Next Top Model
- Indonesia's Next Top Model (cycle 1)
- Indonesia's Next Top Model (cycle 3)
