= Indonesia's Next Top Model season 3 =

Season of television series

Indonesia's Next Top Model
- Season 3
- Indonesia's Next Top Model (cycle 3) cast
- Judges: Luna Maya; Panca Makmun; Ivan Gunawan; Ayu Gani
- No. of contestants: 18
- Winner: Rizkho Maulida Bustomi
- No. of episodes: 40

Release
- Original network: NET.
- Original release: 5 November 2022 – 26 March 2023

Season chronology
- ← Previous; Season 2

The third cycle of Indonesia's Next Top Model aired weekly on Indonesian private broadcaster NET. starting November 5, 2022. All four cast of host and judges from the previous cycle returned in this cycle. Official partners for this cycle are Samsung Galaxy Z Flip 4 5G and beauty cosmetics, MakeOver. This cycle's prizes are cash amounting to hundreds of millions of Rupiahs, Samsung Galaxy Z Flip 4 5G mobile phone, and an all new Yamaha car unit.

The cycle featured an early seven episodes spin-off series titled "Road to INTM Cycle 3", alongside two other series: "Video Reaction INTM Cycle 3" and "Confession Room". Just like the previous cycle, this cycle didn't feature any local nor international destination.

The winner of the competition was 27-year-old Iko Bustomi from Jakarta who was notably a former contestant of the sixth cycle of Asia's Next Top Model, where she finished in eleventh place.

== Cast ==
=== Contestants ===
(Ages stated are at start of contest)

Contestant	Age	Height	Hometown	Finish	Place
Chloë 'Coco' Callista	21	1.71 m (5 ft 7 1/2 in)	Jakarta	Episode 2	18
Michelle Caroline Kerdijk	22	1.76 m (5 ft 9 1/2 in)	Bandung	Episode 4	17
Trixie Theola	29	1.79 m (5 ft 10 1/2 in)	Bandung	Episode 6	16
Shinta Kyrie 'Shynka' Agathalia	26	1.77 m (5 ft 9 1/2 in)	Jakarta	Episode 8	15 (Quit)
Intania 'Intan' Rachma	17	1.72 m (5 ft 7 1/2 in)	Gresik	Episode 12	14
Kezia Sutanto	18	1.74 m (5 ft 8 1/2 in)	Surakarta	Episode 16	13
Raisa Almira Rusmansyah	22	1.73 m (5 ft 8 in)	Yogyakarta	Episode 18	12
Febby 'Fey' Hagania Sandi Zendrato	23	1.78 m (5 ft 10 in)	Jakarta	Episode 20	11
Shalfa Putri Raihan	21	1.68 m (5 ft 6 in)	Bandung	Episode 22	10
Olivia Pramaisella	27	1.70 m (5 ft 7 in)	Jakarta	Episode 24	9
Denissa Chantika Advenetta Pinem	22	1.70 m (5 ft 7 in)	Jakarta	Episode 26	8
Nadia 'Vannes' Vannesa	25	1.68 m (5 ft 6 in)	Bandung	Episode 28	7
Monica Soraya Bajunaid	25	1.75 m (5 ft 9 in)	Jakarta	Episode 32	6
Berlian Aura Yasarah Lubis	19	1.70 m (5 ft 7 in)	Surabaya	Episode 34	5
Nathalie Kezia Susilo	23	1.69 m (5 ft 6 1/2 in)	Jakarta	Episode 36	4
Maria Gabriella 'Marella' Mulwanto	21	1.70 m (5 ft 7 in)	Jakarta	Episode 38	3
Paula Andrea Soesanto	21	1.70 m (5 ft 7 in)	Surabaya	Episode 40	2
Rizkho Maulida 'Iko' Bustomi	27	1.75 m (5 ft 9 in)	Jakarta	Episode 40	1

=== Judges ===
- Luna Maya (host)
- Panca Makmun
- Ivan Gunawan
- Ayu Gani

=== Recurring cast members ===
- Kimmy Jayanti – Guest Judge and Mentor
- Dave Hendrik – Guest Judge
- Whulandary Herman – Guest Judge and Mentor

== Episodes ==
No. overall	No. in season	Title	Original release date
81–82	1–2	"Which Girl Is a Daredevil?"	5 November 2022 6 November 2022
Eighteen models were brought immediately into a large swimming pool area and met Luna Maya and Panca Makmun, in which the judges gave them their very first runway challenge, "The Audition". The girls had to walk on floating platforms that were installed beneath the pool and gave three poses by the end of it. Trixie and Iko won the challenge and became leaders on their first photo shoot, while Nathalie and Michelle was criticized for their walk and poses. As the main winner, Trixie also got a privilege to see some photo references for her team. The first photo shoot session took place at Cikarang Dry Port, where the models had to bring a high fashion pose while hanging on a rope ladder. Indonesian supermodel and actress, Kimmy Jayanti, made an appearance as a guest judge on the very first elimination panel, replacing Luna, who had scheduling conflict. Iko's team won and was declared safe for the week. The models then had their first runway challenge which captured the theme of first class airplane passengers. Iko won the Model of the Week title, while Denissa and Coco landed on bottom two. After further consideration, the judges gave the last photo to Denissa, making Coco became the first contestant to leave the competition.: Featured photographer: Putra Djohan; Special guest: Kimmy Jayanti
83–84	3–4	"Which Girl Dominates the Field?"	12 November 2022 13 November 2022
The remaining girls went back to their model house and saw Coco's last messages that she had left before. As the Model of the Week, Iko automatically became team leader again and got privilege to choose her rival team's leader, in which she chose Fey. This week, the girls met with Panca Makmun and national rhythmic gymnastic athlete, Nabila Evandestiera, in which she would judge the contestants on their mini challenge, "The Rhythmic Gymnastic". The models had to create a 90 seconds' basic choreography and performed it in front of the judges. Iko's team rose to victory once again and got sweet treats back in the model house as a prize for her team. Flexibility challenge continued as the girls had to capture this week's photo shoot in a rotating wheel while advertising Samsung Galaxy Z Flip 4 5G. In mid photo shoot, Iko's right shoulder got dislocated and had to be rushed into hospital, causing her to miss the group photo session, and because of that, Trixie replaced her as the team leader in the group photo shoot. At the panel, Dave Hendrik appeared as guest judge replacing Ivan Gunawan. Trixie, as the co-leader, surprised Iko and the judges by delivering a stunning group photo and brought an absolute win for their group, thus, safe from elimination. After that, the seventeen models walked an avant-garde-themed runway. Berlian became the Model of the Week, while Michelle and Olivia landed on bottom two. Michelle became the second contestant to leave the competition.: Featured photographer: Mario Ardi; Special guests: Nabila Evandestiera, Dave Hendrik
85–86	5–6	"Which Girl Gets Checkmated?"	19 November 2022 20 November 2022
Following Michelle's elimination, the remaining sixteen finalists got drawing sketches as goodbye gifts from Michelle back in the model house. This week's mini challenge was "Trick and Thrift", which the models had to go shopping for four different outfit looks to wear that suit the concept with only 400.000 IDR or about 25.57 USD. As the recent Model of the Week, Berlian became the team leader, and chose Intan as the opposing leader. Berlian led her team to victory and got beauty treatment vouchers as prizes for each member of her team as well as privileges on the next photo shoot and runway challenge. The sixteen models then got into a one-by-one duel for a chess tournament photo shoot with photographer, Grego Gery. At the panel, the remaining finalists walked a gala night-themed runway with Indonesian supermodel, Kimmy Jayanti, once again replacing Luna Maya on judging session. Intan's team won and was declared safe for the week, and while Paula became the Model of the Week, Kezia and Trixie landed on bottom two, Kezia got her photo, resulting in Trixie's shocking elimination, as she was one of the strongest model in the competition.: Featured photographer: Grego Gery; Special guests: Shania Junianatha, Kimmy Jayanti
87–88	7–8	"Which Girl Can Work the Room?"	26 November 2022 27 November 2022
After the girls saw Trixie's last messages, Paula got an extra reward which was a phone call with her family in the confession room. The next morning, Panca Makmun paid a visit to the model house and while he was talking about personal branding, he also revealed that it was time for makeovers, so then the models went into the salon and got their new trademarks. This week's major challenge was a video shoot that represented new personal brandings for the girls with taglines in a truck. Raisa got picked by Paula as opposing leader. Indonesian supermodel and former judge of Asia's Next Top Model Cycle 4, Kelly Tandiono, made an appearance at the judging panel, replacing Ivan Gunawan. Raisa's team won the group video shoot, placing her and the rest of her team in the next round. Continuing this week's theme, the models had to showcase their new personality on the runway challenge. Vannes became the Model of the Week, while Kezia and Shynka landed on the bottom two. Luna handed Shynka's photo, but as to everyone's surprise, Shynka refused that photo and told Luna that she want to quit. As a result of her decision, Kezia was allowed to stay in the competition.: Special guest: Kelly Tandiono
89–90	9–10	"Which Girl Gets Lost in the Woods?"	3 December 2022 4 December 2022
The remaining finalists went to Bogor and met with a well known influencer, Wendy Walters, who will be a guest judge on the "Influencer Vlog" challenge, in which the models had to make three different themes of vlog: food, fashion, and travel. Vannes as the current Model of the Week, chose Olivia to be the opposing leader. Olivia's team came out as winner of the challenge and each of her team member got hand bag as prizes. On the next day, still in Bogor area, the models went into the woods of Pancar Mountain and had to transform as mythical creatures on the photo shoot session. Indonesian actress and supermodel, Asmara Abigail and Kimmy Jayanti, were on set to guide them. At the panel, the girls had their runway challenge with a nightmarish theme. Olivia's team won the group photo and secured their spot for another week. Kezia bounced back to the top and became the Model of the Week, while Monica and Vannes sunk into the bottom two. After deliberation, the judges decided to save Vannes, eliminating Monica.: Featured photographer: Zulham Siregar; Special guests: Wendy Walters, Asmara Abigail, Kimmy Jayanti
91–92	11–12	"Which Girl Can Stand the Limelight?"	10 December 2022 11 December 2022
This week, the girls went to Central Park Jakarta and faced a "Vote for Mannequin" challenge, which they had to pose like mannequins for thirty minutes with two separate groups: pattern outfits and color block outfits. Mall shoppers could vote the group that they thought was the best. As the recent Model of the Week, Kezia got the privileges to choose the clothing style, which she chose pattern outfits. She was also given the right to choose the leader of the opposing team, in which she chose Marella. Season 2's former contestants, Helen and Jolie, appeared as guest judges to give feedbacks for both groups. With the gap of only one vote, Marella's team won the challenge and got vouchers to shop sunglasses immediately at the mall. The next afternoon, the models were welcomed by former Puteri Indonesia 2013, Whulandary Herman, as the guest mentor, with Panca Makmun, whereas the girls had to show a high fashion pose with Top Model alumni, Devina of Season 1 and Audya of Season 2. At the panel, Kimmy Jayanti and Dave Hendrik appeared as guest judges. The judges felt that both team still didn't understand high fashion poses so it was hard to choose the winning group photo, but eventually, Marella's team won and secured a spot on the Top 12. The girls then had a street-themed runway challenge. Iko became the Model of the Week for the second time, while Intan and Vannes landed on bottom two. At the end, Intan was the sixth contestant that went home.: Featured photographer: Mario Ardi; Special guests: Helen Hiu, Tiffany Jolie, Whulandary Herman, Devina Bertha, Audya Ananta, Dave Hendrik, Kimmy Jayanti
93–94	13–14	"Which Girl Turns Fear into Advantage?"	17 December 2022 18 December 2022
This week, the remaining twelve models met with beauty content creator, Cindercella, who was the guest mentor alongside Gani in a "Beyond Transformation" challenge, whereas each team had to create two looks (experimental and iconic) of beauty from head to toe. Iko automatically became team leader alongside Shalfa for the other team, for which she got chosen by Iko. Iko hit the jackpot when she chose Shalfa as she knocked her out in the mini challenge. Her team got MakeOver products as a reward. The next day, the girls were shot by photographer Hardi Budi in Bella Hadid's installation art-inspired photo shoot which went viral back in 2018. Shalfa's team won the group photo and were deemed safe. At the panel, the model walked a painting-themed runway in pairs. As most of contestants didn't deliver great individual photograph, the judges decided to cancel the Model of the Week title, which was a first in the history of the series. However, Nathalie was called out first because her photo was best of the bunch, while Denissa and Fey landed on the bottom two. Luna handed the last photo to Fey, eliminating Denissa after her second time in bottom two.: Featured photographer: Hardi Budi; Special guest: Cindercella
95–96	15–16	"Which Girl Shoots a Glam Dunk?"	24 December 2022 25 December 2022
Eleven remaining models returned to their model house with one shocking news that awaits them later on, which was Olivia's withdrawal from the competition due to her being unwell and deciding to quit the competition to take care of her health. The ten remaining models were welcomed by Indonesian designer, Howard Laurent, to take on a "Fashion Dare" challenge, whereas the models had to craft dresses from papers and other recycling materials. Nathalie chose Raisa for the opposing leader, but it backfired as Raisa's team won the mini challenge and got dresses from the brand, Minimal, as prizes for each team member. The next day, the girls went into a basketball field to shoot a glam-dunk photo shoot with Indonesian actor and basketball enthusiast, Samuel Rizal. At the panel, Nathalie's team won the group photo shoot, which automatically brought their team into the next round. Later at that panel, the models walked a go green-themed runway challenge, which the girls wore recycle and upcycle dresses. Vannes became the Model of the Week for the second time, with Kezia and Berlian landing on the bottom two. Due to Kezia's inconsistency during the last three weeks, the judges decided to send her home although she had a big potential.: Featured photographer: Winston Gomez; Special guests: Howard Laurent, Samuel Rizal, Dave Hendrik
97–98	17–18	"Which Girl Is Having a Great Tea Time?"	7 January 2023 8 January 2023
Nine remaining models finally reached halfway of the competition while the challenges were getting harder. In this week's minor challenge titled "A Day in My Life", the girls met with Indonesian model and actress, Erika Carlina, which will be the guest judge. As the recent Model of the Week, Vannes got to choose her team members, and chose Berlian as the opposing leader. Based on the result, Berlian's team won and got prizes back at the model house. Luna Mail arrived and invited the girls to an afternoon tea time with Gani and Panca on the next day. Little did the girls know that it was also the location of their photo shoot with an iguana. At the panel, Luna was absent and was replaced by Whulandary Herman. The girls then walked a waterfall-themed runway to Lyodra Ginting's song version of "Sang Dewi" (lit. The Goddess). Berlian's team won the group photo shoot. Marella earned her first best photo, becoming Model of the Week, with Nathalie and Raisa both were landing on bottom two for the first time, the result were revealed and it was a last minute call for Nathalie, eliminating Raisa.: Featured photographer: Nicky Gunawan; Special guests: Erika Carlina, Lyodra Ginting, Whulandary Herman
99–100	19–20	"Which Girl Gets Booted Out of the Camp?"	14 January 2023 15 January 2023
Arriving at the model house after Raisa's elimination, Vannes and Fey were told to move to the grey room. The next morning, the girls were awoken to a loud alarm and immediately got order from Luna Mail to wear sport outfits and gears for the next mini challenge, a "Treasure Hunt". Marella chose Vannes as the other leader, but at the end, she led her team to another win and had a team staycation as a prize. The girls then had sport editorial photo shoot on the mud at the same place, and for the first time of the season, only the individual photograph that will be judged at the panel, dismissing the group photo. Still continuing this week's theme, the girls walked a military runway with obstacles while they had to pose near it. Paula earned her second best photo, becoming Model of the Week, while Vannes and Fey landed on bottom two, both for the third and second time. But the judges felt that Vannes photograph was slightly better, comparing to Fey's boring expression from week to week, thus, saving her from elimination and sending Fey home.: Featured photographer: Putra Djohan
101–102	21–22	"Which Girls Get Their Second Chance?"	21 January 2023 22 January 2023
Following Fey's elimination, the remaining models got a Luna Mail, hinting that their spot in Top 7 could be replaced. Gani and Panca then announced that the girls will compete with seven eliminated models, excluding Raisa, Intan, Shynka, and Coco, who chose not to join the comeback for the rest of the week. The rules remained the same from last season, in which the eliminees would get the same minor challenge and photo shoot, and from there, the judges will choose one or two models to return. The mini challenge was "Super Sweaty Plan", where both the remaining models and the eliminees were on one-versus-one sport challenges. Five models from top seven won the challenge, with the exception of Paula and Iko, who lost to Denissa and Trixie respectively. On the photo shoot session, they had to hang upside down on an unrealistic fruit market shop set. At the panel, the models walked a black and white battle runway. Nathalie became Model of the Week, with Olivia, Denissa, and Monica were picked by the judges to return in the competition. Paula and Shalfa landed on bottom two for the first time, but it was Shalfa's photograph was deemed the worst, eliminating her along with four other models who failed to return.: Featured photographer: Hardi Budi
103–104	23–24	"Which Girl Is Free Falling?"	28 January 2023 29 January 2023
Top model alumni, Yumi Kwandy of season 1 and Peace Jemima of season 2, made a surprise visit to the model house and gave the new top nine finalists some advices to spice things up in the competition. Later on the next day, the girls met with Indonesian actress and chef, Sissy Priscilla and William Gozali, to make a videography as minor challenge titled "Roleplay Kitchen", where the models had to do roleplays revolving around restaurant activity. Iko won the challenge and got Nespresso coffee machine as a prize. Model mentor Kimmy Jayanti gave guides and directions to the girls as they had to hang mid-air in a free-from-insecurities photo shoot. At the panel, the girls walked a doll-themed runway, which later Monica became Model of the Week for the first time, with Olivia and Vannes once again landing on the bottom two. At the end, Olivia had to go home for the second time.: Featured photographer: Hardi Budi; Special guests: Yumi Kwandy, Peace Jemima, William Gozali, Sissy Priscilla, Kimmy Jayanti
105–106	25–26	"Which Girl Gets Dragged Away?"	4 February 2023 5 February 2023
Eight remaining models got their second makeover the day after Olivia's elimination with the exception of Denissa since her first makeover already elevated her perfect model look. This week, the girls faced a "Talk & Talk" mini challenge, which was small interviews accompanied by TV presenter, Melaney Ricardo. Iko won the challenge once again and got a watch worth of eight millions Rupiah. Later on, they met with model mentor Kimmy Jayanti to shoot a Nutriville collagen drink ads in pairs on pool floaties. At the panel, the girls faced a dance-themed runway. Marella became Model of the Week for the second time, with Vannes and Denissa landed on bottom two. Luna gave the last photograph to Vannes, making Denissa the second comeback model to go home after Olivia.: Featured photographer: Mario Ardi; Special guests: Melaney Ricardo, Kimmy Jayanti, Sandree Ha
107–108	27–28	"Which Girl Is in a Fairytale Story?"	11 February 2023 12 February 2023
The top seven models met with social media influencer, Awkarin, who helped Panca as guest judge in an "Endorsement Video" mini challenge, whereas the girls had to advertise products such as PVC hand bag and a picnic hat. Marella won the mini challenge and got privilege on the next photo shoot. On set, the girls had to channel their romantic nuances with a male model as if they were on a date while still advertising Yamaha Filano motorcycle. While on the runway challenge, the girls had to walk with child models. Dave Hendrik appeared as guest judge at the panel. Paula became Model of the Week for her third time respectively, with Monica and Vannes yet again landed on bottom two. Due to being in bottom two during the last three weeks also landed on bottom two six times, Vannes was sent home.: Featured photographer: Zaky Akbar (Udaeki); Special guests: Awkarin, Andi Sujono, Dave Hendrik
109–110	29–30	"Which Girl Doubts Herself?"	18 February 2023 19 February 2023
The final six met Panca Makmun and a counseling advisor, Nabila Gasani, to guide the models in a meditation and hypnotherapy session. Immediately afterwards, the models had a mini challenge "A Letter to Myself", which brought tears to some of them. Berlian won the challenge and got a chance to call her family as prizes, along with a chance to practice with stuntwoman, Anggi Puri, before the photo shoot, and stealing one minute of photo shoot time from other models, which she did on Nathalie. This week, the girls had to give action movement looks as if they stars in a blockbuster movie. They also did a runway challenge with the theme of Fire Goddesses. At the panel, Paula had got the judges raised a question whether she still wants to remain in the competition because she was very pessimistic about becoming the final five. At the end, Nathalie was called first, becoming Model of the Week for the second time, while Paula and Berlian landed on bottom two. Luna decided to save both models, resulting in a non-elimination round.: Featured photographer: Diego Verges; Special guests: Nabila Ghassani, Anggipuri Kusuma Dewi
111–112	31–32	"Which Girl Is Ready to Fly?"	25 February 2023 26 February 2023
Indonesian actor, Dwi Sasono, made a surprise visit at the model house to mentor the girls about how to channel their characters in either a photo shoot or video shoot challenge. The next day, the girls had a "DIY Composite Card" challenge, whereas they had to shoot four frames of photo with either of sporty, edgy, feminime, or elegant themes for their personal comp card. Fashion designer, Toton Januar, came over to help Panca Makmun choose the winner. Marella once again won the mini challenge and she got Samsonite suitcases as a reward. Later on, the girls were brought into a field where they had to pose as cheerleaders for this week's photo shoot, guided by guest mentor and judge, Whulandary Herman. At the panel, the girls walked a surfer-themed runway. Paula bounced back to the top and became Model of the Week for the fourth times, with Marella and Monica sunk onto the bottom two. Marella got her photograph, joining the final five, eliminating Monica for the second time.: Featured photographer: Putra Djohan; Special guests: Dwi Sasono, Toton Januar, Whulandary Herman, The A Team Cheerleading
113–114	33–34	"Which Girl Will Go Beyond Limits?"	4 March 2023 5 March 2023
This week, the final five were brought into a "Go & See" challenge, where they had to wear and walk the designs by Maison Baaz Couture, Wilsen Willim, and Adrie Basuki. The model with the most booked automatically wins. Iko was hired by all three designers, thus she won the challenge and as prizes, she can bring home dresses one each from the three designers. On the other side, Nathalie was the only model who didn't get booked by any designer. The next day on set, the girls had to flaunt their beauties for MakeOver ads as they pose while doing aerial yoga. Moving on to judging session, the models wore colorful traditional kebaya dresses for runway challenge. Marella was called first, getting her third Model of the Week, followed by Iko and Nathalie, placing yet again Surabayan bestfriends, Paula and Berlian on bottom two. At the end, the pressure gets to Berlian and it was shown on her photograph, thus, eliminating her and saving Paula.: Featured photographer: Zaky Akbar (Udaeki); Special guests: Cacal Baker, Diaz Patria, Wilsen Willim, Adrie Basuki, Kimmy Jayanti, Dave Hendrik
115–116	35–36	"Which Girl Dances Her Way to the Top?"	11 March 2023 12 March 2023
At the model house, Luna Mail popped up and hinting the word "speed" for the next challenge, and it turns out the models were given "Mission of the Day", which they had to find twenty puzzles pieces scattered inside a haystack. As the girls started to put the puzzles together, they realized that the pieces started to form their families' photo. Marella, given a two minutes head start as her Model of the Week privilege, completed the puzzles first, followed by Nathalie, Paula, and Iko. Later on, Panca revealed that it was a family reunion week as family members of each model walks in. Gani told the girls that they will have a family reunion portrait for this week's photo shoot, shot by Jacky Suharto. Marella who won the challenge before, received a brief session with her family before the photo shoot. At the panel, the models had runway challenge with the theme of The Great Gatsby. Iko received her third Model of the Week title, becoming the first semifinalist, with Marella and Nathalie landing on bottom two. Gani called Marella as the last girl to be on semifinal, eliminating Nathalie.: Featured photographer: Jacky Suharto; Special guests: Family members of each model, Rendi Putra, Kimmy Jayanti, Paula Verhoeven
117–118	37–38	"Which Girl Exudes a Star Aura?"	18 March 2023 19 March 2023
Semifinal week began with a "Gala Dinner" challenge which featured former contestants from cycle one and two and also resident judge Panca Makmun and Kimmy Jayanti. The girls had to give the best answer from questions that the audience asked to win the challenge. At the end, Iko won the challenge once again and got a pair of jewelries. On the photo shoot set, the models were tasked to pose as fearless newborn stars on theatrical rigging set. At the panel, the final three were joined by past winners, Ilene and Sarah, in a fashion carnaval runway challenge. Paula's performances earned her Model of the Week for the fifth time, becoming the first finalist for next week's season finale, which later on followed by Iko, automatically eliminating Marella and placing her on third place of the season.: Featured photographer: Hendra Kusuma; Special guests: Teuku "Jordan" Zacky, Kimmy Jayanti, Eveline Effendi, Clafita Witoko, Yumi Kwandy, Ranti Kusuma, Devina Bertha, Yolanda Wenur, Tiffany Zhu, Alfirda Alifia, Evanny Wityo, Peace Jemima, Danella Ilene, Sarah Tumiwa
119–120	39–40	"Which Girl Is Top Model Worthy?"	25 March 2023 26 March 2023
The finalists, Iko and Paula traveled to Yogyakarta for their final photo shoot. The night before, they had a special dinner with judges Luna Maya and Panca Makmun to talk about their progress in the competition, which later on Luna teased the girls about the final photo shoot. Arriving at Parangkusumo Sand Dune on the next day, Panca gave the models a surprise twist, which was the girls will be accompanied by Luna Maya on the full body shot photo. Immediately after the photo session, the girls went back to Jakarta for their final runway's preparation and to reunite with both families who came to support. Following the last season, they had a fitting time at Ivan Gunawan's Boutique, which they wore his designs on the final runway. Iko and Paula were joined by some former contestants in a "Women in Suits" runway wearing Ernesto Abram's collections for the first look, with "Dazzling" theme wearing Ivan Gunawan's collections as the second look. After the final deliberation, the judges announced Iko Bustomi as Indonesia's Next Top Model, with Paula Andrea placing as runner-up.: Featured photographer: Rio Wibowo; Special guests: Bubah Alfian, Soundwave

== Results ==
=== Call-out order ===
Order	Episodes																			
Order	2	4	6	8 (Note: In Episode 8, Intan was absent at the panel due to passing out after deliberation, but was declared safe from elimination. Kezia and Shynka landed in bottom two. Shynka decided to quit the competition immediately after Kezia's elimination, allowing Kezia to remain in the competition.)	10 (Note: In Episode 10, Intan was absent at the panel due to passing out after deliberation, but was declared safe from elimination.)	12	14 (Note: In Episode 14, the judges decided to cancel the Model of the Week title, but Nathalie was called first because her photo was best of the bunch.)	16 (Note: In Episode 15, Olivia decided to quit the competition due to her health condition after last week's panel. However, elimination still took place in the following episode.)	18	20	22 (Note: In Episode 21, seven out of eleven eliminated models were brought back for a chance to return into the competition. They received the same minor challenge and photo shoot of the week and will be judged individually at the panel. At the end of Episode 22, Olivia, Denissa, and Monica had the best photographs among the eliminees. Thus, they were allowed to return.)	24	26	28	30 (Note: In Episode 30, Berlian and Paula landed on bottom two. The judges decided to save both girls, resulting in no elimination.)	32	34	36	38	40
1	Iko	Berlian	Paula	Vannes	Kezia	Iko	Nathalie	Vannes	Marella	Paula	Nathalie	Monica	Marella	Paula	Nathalie	Paula	Marella	Iko	Paula	Iko
2	Berlian	Nathalie	Intan	Shalfa	Paula	Marella	Olivia	Marella	Shalfa	Berlian	Marella	Marella	Berlian	Marella	Monica	Berlian	Iko	Paula	Iko	Paula
3	Fey	Iko	Berlian	Denissa	Berlian	Nathalie	Vannes	Nathalie	Berlian	Iko	Olivia	Nathalie	Iko	Nathalie	Iko	Nathalie	Nathalie	Marella	Marella	
4	Shynka	Paula	Olivia	Paula	Denissa	Olivia	Marella	Shalfa	Paula	Shalfa	Vannes	Berlian	Monica	Iko	Marella	Iko	Paula	Nathalie		
5	Nathalie	Trixie	Marella	Berlian	Iko	Berlian	Shalfa	Fey	Vannes	Nathalie	Denissa	Paula	Nathalie	Berlian	Berlian; Paula	Marella	Berlian			
6	Vannes	Kezia	Nathalie	Nathalie	Nathalie	Paula	Berlian	Raisa	Iko	Marella	Monica	Iko	Paula	Monica	Berlian; Paula	Monica				
7	Marella	Vannes	Denissa	Iko	Intan	Shalfa	Paula	Paula	Fey	Vannes	Iko	Denissa	Vannes	Vannes						
8	Monica	Monica	Fey	Olivia	Shalfa	Raisa	Raisa	Iko	Nathalie	Fey	Berlian	Vannes	Denissa							
9	Olivia	Marella	Monica	Fey	Raisa	Fey	Iko	Berlian	Raisa		Paula	Olivia								
10	Trixie	Shynka	Shalfa	Marella	Fey	Kezia	Kezia	Kezia			Shalfa									
11	Paula	Shalfa	Shynka	Raisa	Olivia	Denissa	Fey	Olivia												
12	Raisa	Denissa	Raisa	Monica	Marella	Vannes	Denissa													
13	Kezia	Raisa	Vannes	Intan	Vannes	Intan														
14	Shalfa	Fey	Iko	Shynka	Monica															
15	Intan	Intan	Kezia	Kezia																
16	Michelle	Olivia	Trixie																	
17	Denissa	Michelle																		
18	Coco																			

The contestant was originally eliminated but was saved
The contestant quit the competition
The contestant was absent at the panel and was safe
The contestant was eliminated
The contestant returned to the competition
The contestant was a part of a non-elimination bottom two
The contestant won the competition

=== Bottom two ===
Episode	Contestants			Eliminated
2	Coco	&	Denissa	Coco
4	Olivia	&	Michelle	Michelle
6	Trixie	&	Kezia	Trixie
8	Shynka	&	Kezia	Shynka
10	Monica	&	Vannes	Monica
12	Intan	&	Vannes	Intan
14	Denissa	&	Fey	Denissa
16	Kezia	&	Berlian	Olivia
16	Kezia	&	Berlian	Kezia
18	Nathalie	&	Raisa	Raisa
20	Fey	&	Vannes	Fey
22	Paula	&	Shalfa	Shalfa
24	Olivia	&	Vannes	Olivia
26	Vannes	&	Denissa	Denissa
28	Monica	&	Vannes	Vannes
30	Berlian	&	Paula	None
32	Marella	&	Monica	Monica
34	Paula	&	Berlian	Berlian
36	Marella	&	Nathalie	Nathalie
38	Iko	&	Marella	Marella
40	Paula	&	Iko	Paula

The contestant was eliminated after their first time in the bottom two
The contestant was eliminated after their second time in the bottom two
The contestant was eliminated after their third time in the bottom two
The contestant was eliminated after their sixth time in the bottom two
The contestant quit the competition
The contestant was eliminated and placed as the runner-up

=== Average call-out order ===
Rank by average	Place	Model	Call-out total	Number of call-outs	Call-out average
1	4	Nathalie	68	18	3.78
2	2	Paula	83	20	4.15
3	5	Berlian	71	17	4.18
4	3	Marella	81	19	4.26
5	1	Iko	90	20	4.5
6	7	Vannes	94	14	6.71
7	6	Monica	76	11	6.91
8	10	Shalfa	77	11	7
9	9	Olivia	66	9	7.33
10	11	Fey	84	10	8.4
11	8	Denissa	86	10	8.6
12	15	Shynka	39	4	9.75
13	12	Raisa	88	9	9.78
14	13	Kezia	80	8	10
15	16	Trixie	31	3	10.33
16	14	Intan	65	6	10.83
17	17	Michelle	33	2	16.5
18	18	Coco	18	1	18

=== Photo / video shoot guide ===
- Episode 1 photo shoot: Hanging on a rope ladder by the port
- Episode 3 photo shoot: Posing in a rotating wheel
- Episode 5 photo shoot: Chess pieces' duel in pairs
- Episode 7 video shoot: "Free The New You" high fashion video in a truck
- Episode 9 photo shoot: Mythical creatures in the forest
- Episode 11 photo shoot: High fashion duo with Top Model alumni
- Episode 13 photo shoot: Installation art in clear box
- Episode 15 photo shoot: Basketball editorial with Samuel Rizal
- Episode 17 photo shoot: Tea time with iguana
- Episode 19 photo shoot: Sport editorial on the mud
- Episode 21 photo shoot: Unrealistic upside down at fruit market
- Episode 23 photo shoot: "Get Out from Insecurities" while hanging mid-air in a hollow cube
- Episode 25 photo shoot: Nutriville summer beauty shot while floating on a pool in pairs
- Episode 27 photo shoot: Romantic date while featuring Yamaha Filano with Andi Sujono
- Episode 29 photo shoot: Action movie poster
- Episode 31 photo shoots: Comp cards; Diva cheerleaders
- Episode 33 photo shoot: Beauty and beyond for MakeOver while doing aerial yoga
- Episode 35 photo shoot: Bohemian family celebration portrait
- Episode 37 photo shoot: Newborn stars on theatrical rigging
- Episode 39 photo shoot: Heart of the desert at Parangkusumo Sand Dune with Luna Maya

=== Makeovers ===
In Episode 25, all eight finalists received their second makeover, with the exception of Denissa, whose hair wasn't trimmed or styled.

Name	First makeover	Second makeover
Berlian	Trimmed and added curtain bangs	Added more volume and wavy cut
Denissa	Neck-length bob cut	
Fey	Added short bangs with burgundy ombre	
Iko	Trimmed with blunt tips	Messy and curly cut
Intan	Trimmed with brown highlights	
Kezia	Black with blonde money piece highlights	
Marella	Edgy wolf cut	Shortened with side bangs
Monica	Shoulder-length wavy cut and added wispy bangs	Neck-length cut with side bangs
Nathalie	Shoulder-length bob cut	Shortened
Olivia	Straight shoulder-length cut	
Paula	Trimmed with comma tips	Trimmed and styling
Raisa	Lob cut with blunt tips	
Shalfa	Chin-length wavy cut with dark blue ombre and added short bangs	
Shynka	Trimmed and straightened	
Vannes	Wavy shoulder-length cut with ash-brown highlights	Brown retouching

== Supporting shows ==
=== Road to INTM Cycle 3 ===
Road to INTM Cycle 3 showcased the seven behind-the-scenes audition footages of 30 semi-finalists before reduced into the pool of 18 final contestants. It aired weekly on NET. every Saturday and Sunday at 12.00, starting from October 8, 2022. The show features the 12 contestants that did not pass the final audition:

Contestant	Nickname	Age	Hometown
Angel Novelia Autuma	Angel	23	Pekanbaru
Fabella Renatha Trianka	Fabel	27	Jakarta
Karina Widjaja	Karina	27	Makassar
Kezia Hanggara	Kezia	24	Bangka
Khai Br. Samura	Khai	24	Bali
Momo Moriska	Moriska	25	Padang
Natasha Keniraras	Keni	24	Mataram
Priyanka Mutiara	Mutiara	21	Batam
Reyna Azzahra Putri	Reyna	21	Palembang
Sarah Humaira	Sarah	26	Jakarta
Syifa Aulia	Syifa	17	Majalengka
Yosefina Eunike	Eunike	22	Jakarta

=== Confession Room ===
Confession Room showcased the vents of the contestants throughout their time quarantining at the model house. It aired weekly on NET. every Wednesday at 19.00, starting from November 9, 2022.

=== Video Reaction INTM Cycle 3 ===
Video Reaction INTM Cycle 3 showcased the reactions of Top Model alumni watching each episodes of this season. It aired weekly on NET. every Thursday and Friday at 19.00, starting from November 10, 2022. After episode 20 of this season, Video Reaction INTM Cycle 3 aired every Friday at 19:00, and after episode 28 of this season, Video Reaction INTM Cycle 3 only aired every Tuesday at 19.00.

No. overall	No. in season	Title	Original release date
1	1	"React the Audition"	10 November 2022
Models featured: Helen and Jolie from season 2; Episode reacted: Episode 1 (Which Girl Is a Daredevil?)
2	2	"React First Elimination"	11 November 2022
Models featured: Helen and Jolie from season 2; Episode reacted: Episode 2 (Which Girl Is a Daredevil?)
3	3	"React Flex Wheel"	17 November 2022
Models featured: Devina from season 1 and Jolie from season 2; Episode reacted: Episode 3 (Which Girl Dominates the Field?)
4	4	"React Go Big or Go Home"	18 November 2022
Models featured: Devina from season 1 and Jolie from season 2; Episode reacted: Episode 4 (Which Girl Dominates the Field?)
5	5	"React Battle Photoshoot"	24 November 2022
Models featured: Yumi from season 1 and Sarah from season 2; Episode reacted: Episode 5 (Which Girl Gets Checkmated?)
6	6	"React Group Result"	25 November 2022
Models featured: Yumi from season 1 and Sarah from season 2; Episode reacted: Episode 6 (Which Girl Gets Checkmated?)
7	7	"React It's Transformation Day"	1 December 2022
Models featured: Yumi from season 1 and Helen from season 2; Episode reacted: Episode 7 (Which Girl Can Work the Room?)
8	8	"React Shynka Signing Out"	2 December 2022
Models featured: Yumi from season 1 and Helen from season 2; Episode reacted: Episode 8 (Which Girl Can Work the Room?)
9	9	"React the Mythical Influencer"	8 December 2022
Models featured: Alfi and Evanny from season 2; Episode reacted: Episode 9 (Which Girl Gets Lost in the Woods?)
10	10	"React from Zero to Hero"	9 December 2022
Models featured: Alfi and Evanny from season 2; Episode reacted: Episode 10 (Which Girl Gets Lost in the Woods?)
11	11	"React High Fashion Duo"	15 December 2022
Models featured: Peace and Sarah from season 2; Episode reacted: Episode 11 (Which Girl Can Stand the Limelight?)
12	12	"React Are You the Spotlight"	16 December 2022
Models featured: Peace and Sarah from season 2; Episode reacted: Episode 12 (Which Girl Can Stand the Limelight?)
13	13	"React Beyond Transformation"	22 December 2022
Models featured: Clafita and Devina from season 1; Episode reacted: Episode 13 (Which Girl Turns Fear into Advantage?)
14	14	"React Model of the Week"	23 December 2022
Models featured: Clafita and Devina from season 1; Episode reacted: Episode 14 (Which Girl Turns Fear into Advantage?)
16	16	"React Go Green Runway"	30 December 2022
Models featured: Audya and Yolanda from season 2; Episode reacted: Episode 16 (Which Girl Shoots a Glam Dunk?)
17	17	"React Show Your Empress Beauty"	12 January 2023
Models featured: Evanny and Sitta from season 2; Episode reacted: Episode 17 (Which Girl Is Having a Great Tea Time?)
18	18	"React the Goddess"	13 January 2023
Models featured: Evanny and Sitta from season 2; Episode reacted: Episode 18 (Which Girl Is Having a Great Tea Time?)
19	19	"React Unexpected Things Could Happen Anytime"	19 January 2023
Models featured: Faradina and Sitta from season 2; Episode reacted: Episode 19 (Which Girl Gets Booted Out of the Camp?)
20	20	"React the Military Runway"	20 January 2023
Models featured: Faradina and Sitta from season 2; Episode reacted: Episode 20 (Which Girl Gets Booted Out of the Camp?)
21	21	"React Upside Down and Last"	27 January 2023
Models featured: Ranti and Yumi from season 1; Episode reacted: Episode 21-22 (Which Girls Get Their Second Chance?)
22	22	"React Release Your Insecurities and the Doll"	3 February 2023
Models featured: Clafita and Ilene from season 1; Episode reacted: Episode 23-24 (Which Girl Is Free Falling?)
23	23	"React Talk and Talk, Move Your Body, and Hit the Runway"	10 February 2023
Models featured: Helen and Sarah from season 2; Episode reacted: Episode 25-26 (Which Girl Gets Dragged Away?)
24	24	"React Take Me on a Date and Mini Me"	17 February 2023
Models featured: Devina from season 1 and Jolie from season 2; Episode reacted: Episode 27-28 (Which Girl Is in a Fairytale Story?)
25	25	"React Photo Shoot Action and Goddess of Fire"	24 February 2023
Models featured: Grace from season 1 and Evanny from season 2; Episode reacted: Episode 29-30 (Which Girl Doubts Herself?)
26	26	"React Impress Us and Bring It on"	3 March 2023
Models featured: Jolie and Sitta from season 2; Episode reacted: Episode 31-32 (Which Girl Is Ready to Fly?)
27	27	"React It's Casting Day and Kartini Indonesia"	10 March 2023
Models featured: Yumi from season 1 and Sarah from season 2; Episode reacted: Episode 33-34 (Which Girl Will Go Beyond Limits?)
28	28	"React Family Reunion and the Great Gatsby"	14 March 2023
Models featured: Ilene and Yumi from season 1; Episode reacted: Episode 35-36 (Which Girl Dances Her Way to the Top?)
29	29	"React the Gala Dinner and a Star Is Born"	21 March 2023
Models featured: Shalfa and Vaness from season 3; Episode reacted: Episode 37-38 (Which Girl Exudes a Star Aura?)
30	30	"React the Final Photo Shoot and the Champion"	28 March 2023
Models featured: Helen and Sarah from season 2; Episode reacted: Episode 39-40 (Which Girl Is Top Model Worthy?)

== Controversy ==
=== Luna mocking Shynka for quitting ===
In episode 8, contestants Shynka and Kezia landed in the bottom two. Luna then revealed that Shynka is safe, leaving Kezia to be eliminated, after which Shynka tearfully declared that she'd rather quit the competition instead of continuing. She confessed that she never felt appreciated by the judges despite the amount of hard work and effort she gave during her time on the competition and she felt that she can no longer take the pressure. Luna responded, "If the judges didn't appreciate [Shynka's] hard work, [she] would've been the one eliminated" and that Shynka is the one who didn't appreciate her own ability. However, the judges let Shynka quit the competition, while Kezia was saved. Not long after the episode aired, Luna posted a vlog on YouTube where toward the end of it, she called Shynka bego (very stupid) and mocked her decision to quit. Luna then received a lot of criticism for her remarks towards Shynka in the comments section and those statements were eventually edited out from the video. Viewers were seen debating on whether Shynka's decision to quit the competition was unreasonable enough to warrant such response.

== See also ==
- Indonesia's Next Top Model
