= Jakarta Undercover =

- Promotional poster
- Directed by: Lance Laggong
- Screenplay by: Joko Anwar
- Based on: novel by same titled by Moammar Emka
- Produced by: Erwin Arnada; Luna Maya
- Starring: Luna Maya; Lukman Sardi; Christian Sugiono; Verdi Solaiman; Adri Valery Wens (Val Wens); Ray Sahetapy
- Cinematography: Yadi Sugandi
- Edited by: Cesa David Luckmansyah
- Music by: Andi Ayunir
- Production company: Starvision Plus
- Distributed by: Starvision Plus
- Release date: March 22, 2007
- Running time: 100 minutes
- Country: Indonesia
- Language: Indonesia

Jakarta Undercover is a 2007 Indonesian movie, based on the bestseller novel by Moammar Emka. The film was directed by Lance, written by Joko Anwar, and stars Luna Maya, Lukman Sardi, Verdi Solaiman, Christian Sugiono, Laura Annonetta, and Ammee Juliette. This film was released on March 22, 2007.

== Plot ==
After accidentally killing her temperamental father in order to save her mom from his abuse, Vickytra (Luna Maya) flees from Medan to Jakarta with her autistic brother, Ara (Kenshiro Arashi). To make ends meet in Jakarta, Viki poses as a transvestite and works as a striptease dancer. With no one to watch over her brother, Vicky brings Ara every night to the club where she works and hides him in one corner of the room at the club. One day, Ara accidentally witnesses an act of murder by Haryo (Lukman Sardi), son of an official, and his friends. Realizing his crime was witnessed by Ara, Haryo and his friends chase Viki and Ara, determined to silence the two before they go to the police. For the sake of saving his brother's life, Viki secretly flees from one place to another in order to escape Haryo and friends.
