= Indonesia's Next Top Model season 1 =

Season of television series

Indonesia's Next Top Model
- Season 1
- Indonesia's Next Top Model (cycle 1) cast
- Judges: Luna Maya; Deddy Corbuzier; Patricia Gouw; Panca Makmun
- No. of contestants: 16
- Winner: Ilene Kurniawan
- No. of episodes: 40

Release
- Original network: NET.
- Original release: 28 November 2020 – 9 April 2021

Season chronology
- Next → Season 2

The first cycle of Indonesia's Next Top Model aired weekly on Indonesian private broadcaster NET., starting November 28, 2020. Indonesian supermodel and actress Luna Maya and Deddy Corbuzier were added to the panel as the host and creative consultant of the show respectively, while Patricia Gouw and Panca Makmun were added to the panel as judge, catwalk coach, and main model mentor. Ayu Gani and Jesslyn Lim from Asia's Next Top Model were added as model mentors throughout the cycle. This season saw 16 contestants vying for a brand new Honda HR-V and cash amounting to hundreds of millions of Rupiahs.

The first cycle of the show was filmed under strict health protocols as it was produced during the COVID-19 pandemic, which also made the production team unable to take contestants to an international destination like the other Top Model editions around the world. However, the top five contestants took a trip to the coastal town of Anyer and stayed overnight as a local destination.

The winner of the competition was 24-year-old Danella Ilene, from Bali.

== Cast ==
=== Contestants ===
(Ages stated are at start of contest)

Contestant	Age	Height	Hometown	Finish	Place
Esther 'Kian' Septavira Luberta	22	1.77 m (5 ft 9 1/2 in)	Bali	Episode 4	16
Shania Binti Mahir Hamdun	22	1.76 m (5 ft 9 1/2 in)	Yogyakarta	Episode 6	15
Natalie 'Indira' Indirasvari Kristensen	27	1.70 m (5 ft 7 in)	Bali	Episode 8	14
Ilmi Arsala Alaihi	25	1.70 m (5 ft 7 in)	Jakarta	Episode 10	13
Flores Cantika Timoer	24	1.74 m (5 ft 8 1/2 in)	Bandung	Episode 16	12
Eveline Effendi Tan	22	1.70 m (5 ft 7 in)	Jakarta	Episode 20	11
Masyitah Arwin	26	1.68 m (5 ft 6 in)	Jakarta	Episode 22	10
Audrey Bianca Callista	17	1.75 m (5 ft 9 in)	Jakarta	Episode 24	9
Maria 'Clafita' Witoko	24	1.73 m (5 ft 8 in)	Bali	Episode 26	8
Wirda Regina 'Sheren' Simamora	22	1.74 m (5 ft 8 1/2 in)	Yogyakarta	Episode 28	7
Grace Savior Innochintya Lesbasa	18	1.72 m (5 ft 7 1/2 in)	Surabaya	Episode 32	6
Yumi Kwandy	24	1.73 m (5 ft 8 in)	Makassar	Episode 34	5
Ranti Kusuma Putri	25	1.73 m (5 ft 8 in)	Jakarta	Episode 36	4
Vintha 'Devina' Bertha	23	1.71 m (5 ft 7 1/2 in)	Bali	Episode 38	3
Galatia Amanda 'Gea' Lim	24	1.77 m (5 ft 9 1/2 in)	Jakarta	Episode 40	2
Danella 'Ilene' Kurniawan	24	1.73 m (5 ft 8 in)	Bali	Episode 40	1

=== Judges ===
- Luna Maya (host)
- Deddy Corbuzier
- Patricia Gouw
- Panca Makmun

=== Model mentors ===
- Ayu Gani
- Jesslyn Lim

== Episodes ==
No. overall	No. in season	Title	Original release date
1–2	1–2	"The Girl Who Climbs to the Top"	28 November 2020 29 November 2020
After a nationwide selection, the final 16 contestants were taken to the model house and instantly learned a runway lesson tutored by Luna Maya and Panca Makmun, who was this season's model mentor and creative director. The next day, the girls competed in a "Two-minute Runway Challenge" in teams, with each team comprising four contestants. Each team must strut the runway while being showered with water and must fade out of the runway as the runway music stops. Ranti's team won the challenge. The next day, they were taken to a rock climbing set for their first photo shoot and had to pose while climbing the rock cliff wall. During the elimination day, the judges gave positive feedbacks to Sheren, earning her the first best picture of the whole season. However, the judges deemed Indira and Kian's performance were lackluster during the photo session, dragging them directly to the bottom two positions. Indira was originally eliminated but was later saved by the judges after realizing that her model potential might lead her to the top of the leaderboard in the future.: Featured photographer: Ryan Tandya
3–4	3–4	"The Girl Who Is in Top Speed"	5 December 2020 6 December 2020
After a non-elimination round in the previous week, the girls arrived in their model house and drama between Gea, Yumi, and other contestants boiled immediately. The challenge for this week was the "How to Style Challenge", in which they had to showcase three fashion looks from a random wardrobe on a runway within 2 minutes only. Sheren's team won the challenge and received diamond necklaces as a prize for each model in the team. The next day, the models were taken to a large parking set and was greeted by Asia's Next Top Model Cycle 3 winner Ayu Gani, who was also going to direct their photo shoot session alongside Patricia. In this photo shoot, the models must ride a drifting Honda Civic Type R, which was driven by racer Alvin Bahar, and immediately posed with the car afterward. Indira proved to the judges that she could redeem her downfall last week, earning her the best photo of the week. On the other hand, Kian had to be the first contestant to go home after landing on the bottom two twice in a row.: Featured photographer: Nicky Gunawan; Special guests: Adi Surantha, Ayu Gani, Alvin Bahar
5–6	5–6	"The Girl Who Rocks at Phinisi"	12 December 2020 13 December 2020
The girls came back to the model house after Kian's elimination which resulted in Ilmi's emotional meltdown. This week's challenge was to do a "Weird Pose" using house furniture in groups of three. Most of the groups delivered stunning photos but Devina's team eventually won the challenge. The next day, the models had their makeovers done by Andreas Zhu. Tensions arose at the model house about Sheren's fake personality. After the girls received a Luna Mail, they went to a pinisi cruise the next day to shoot their first TV commercial for Ellips Hair Vitamins. Gea and Grace were prasied by their amazing video shoot session, with Gea getting a first call-out of the week. Ranti and Shania landed on bottom two, but the judges agreed that the girl who had the worst commercial was Shania, eliminating her.: Special guests: Andreas Zhu
7–8	7–8	"The Girl Who Skates to Standout"	19 December 2020 20 December 2020
The next morning after the third elimination round, the models were awoken by the sound of military alarm, which signaled their next mini challenge, "The Military Course", where the models had to pass through one-on-one physical fitness obstacles. Yumi excelled and led her to her first victory, which she was given an advantage to steal one minute time of photo shoot from the other models. Yumi chose to steal Gea's. The models then were introduced to an Indonesian actor, Jerome Kurnia, and had to do a street style-themed photo shoot with him on roller skates. Audrey and Devina did the best among others, which resulted to Devina being awarded as the best photo of the week. Grace, Ranti, Masyitah, and Indira struggled as Masyitah and Indira landed on bottom two. After criticized for being inconsistent week after week, Indira became the third model to be eliminated, despite having a best photo before.: Featured photographer: Putra Djohan; Special guests: Randy Pangalila, Jerome Kurnia
9–10	9–10	"The Girl Who Is on Fire"	26 December 2020 27 December 2020
The models returned to their model house and while they were enjoying their time on swimming and yoga, Panca Makmun came in to give the models a lesson about "Personal Branding" which included their next challenge about random fashion styling but can give the judges personal brand looks to their own clothes. For the second consecutive week, Yumi was chosen as the winner of the challenge. This week's photo shoot was to showcase toughness and elegance at the same time while posing with Honda CR-V on the fire runway. At the panel, the judges were impressed by Audrey's, Yumi's, and Grace's growth during the competition, giving Audrey her first best photo. Both Ilmi and Sheren landed on bottom two for the first time, but it was Ilmi's blank and boring face expression photo that sent her home.: Featured photographer: Putra Djohan; Special guests: Caren Delano
11–12	11–12	"The Girl Who Gets Twisted"	2 January 2021 3 January 2021
After the fifth panel, the models got a chance to call their family or friends for two minutes. Their next challenge for this week was to "Dance on a Treadmill" in pairs guided by professional dancer, Reza Muhammad. Masyitah and Devina won the challenge. They received gifts which were a sport suit and yoga mat for each girl. The next day, they had to do a photo shoot using wild jewelries with snakes, and they had to do it in the same pairs from the last challenge. Almost every models succeeded despite their fear to snakes, but Eveline and Clafita were giving a lot of outstanding photos, giving them best photos of the week and tied for first call-out. At judging panel, Grace and Ranti sunk to bottom two, but it was Ranti's time to go home, though she have lot of potential to be a model.: Featured photographer: Nicky Gunawan; Special guests: Reza Muhammad, Hendrico Andrian
13–14	13–14	"The Girl Who Freezes and Drowns"	7 January 2021 8 January 2021
After Ranti's elimination, Clafita had a meltdown in the models' house, since Ranti is her closest friend. When gossip things got too complicated between the models, Ayu Gani and Patricia suddenly came in and gave the models a mini challenge "Pose Pose Pose" where the winners of the challenge can choose their team members for the bigger challenge, "The Mannequins Challenge", whereas the models have to pose in teams for 30 minutes while wearing haute couture dresses in public mall. Eveline's team did the best among the three teams, but eventually Flores won the challenge and got an advantage on the next photo shoot. This week's photo shoot was all about beauty underwater, where the models had to advertise Ellips Crystal Balls while wearing couture dress underwater. Yumi, Clafita, and Devina excelled while Flores and Audrey struggled. At the panel, Yumi got her first first call-out, and while Audrey and Grace were on the bottom two, the judges saved both models cause the judges still saw potential among them. Thus, there was no elimination.: Featured photographer: Martha Suherman; Special guests: Ayu Gani
15–16	15–16	"The Girl Who Finally Speaks Up"	14 January 2021 15 January 2021
Last week's bottom two's contestants, Audrey and Grace immediately got a call from their home after arrived in the model house, with two contradicting news: Audrey got accepted in university at the Netherlands, while Grace's grandmother passed away. The next day after the news, the models had a "Hosting Challenge" in pairs with a former Indonesian Idol co-host, Sere Kalina. Eventually, Devina and Audrey won the challenge and got an extra two frames, while Grace and Eveline were the bottom two of the challenge, and only got four frames on the next photo shoot. The next morning before the photo shoot, Indonesian actor, Verrell Bramasta, came to the model house, and gave few of the models a breakfast treat. In the studio, the girls had to pose while being splashed with colour paint. At night the girls received a Skull Mail for tomorrow's elimination. On the judging panel, Gea threw Ilene, Clafita, and Yumi under the bus to the judges, saying that the three of them were often disagree about some week's best photo and the judges comments. After evaluation, Ilene's photo was chosen as the best photo of this week, and for the first time, Flores and Eveline were on the bottom two. Eveline was declared safe, sending Flores home.: Featured photographer: Putra Djohan; Special guests: Sere Kalina, Verrell Bramasta
17–18	17–18	"The Girl Who Is Stuck in the Racecourse"	21 January 2021 22 January 2021
Drama continues at the model house as Yumi got enraged seeing foods in the chiller were being labelled with only the blue room contestants' names without her and her roommates' recognition. The next day, the models were challenged to take an "Endorsement Photo" with summer vibes theme. Eveline and Audrey outshined the others, but Eveline's photo were picked as the best. She then received a Fujifilm camera as a gift. The models were introduced to Jesslyn Lim, former contestant of Asia's Next Top Model Cycle 6 to guide them for this week's photo shoot, which the models had to style their own looks then jumped on trampoline with Honda Brio. Devina became the first model to earn two best photos, and after weeks of weak photos, Grace was sent home after landing on bottom two with Eveline.: Featured photographer: Putra Djohan; Special guests: Ayu Gani, Jesslyn Lim
19–20	19–20	"The Girl Who Has Too Much Energy"	28 January 2021 29 January 2021
Back to the model house, Yumi, Clafita, and Ilene got notes from Grace after her elimination which makes them emotional. The next day, the girls had a challenge to "Go and Pose" in six different wonderland / family vacation landmarks and had their photos taken in teams within twenty minutes. Yumi, Audrey, and Devina won the challenge and had a privilege to choose one extra member to join them in Korean buffet dinner for that night, which they chose Gea. The models then surprised by a Luna Mail, which it told them that they will have a TV commercial shoot in the barn with horses tomorrow. At the commercial set, Eveline and Devina struggled, while Yumi and Masyitah excelled. Indonesian famous designer, Ivan Gunawan, came to panel as special judge. Yumi wasn't present at the panel due to her condition after gastrointestinal infection surgery. For the first time, Masyitah earned her first first call-out, Sheren and Eveline landed on bottom two. And after three weeks on bottom two, Eveline's fear of animals was shown too much in her TV commercial, sending her home.: Special guests: Ammar Zoni, Ivan Gunawan
21–22	21–22	"The Girl Who Flies High in the Sky"	4 February 2021 5 February 2021
At the model house, Sheren's bed plate was moved to the green room, joining Clafita, Ilene, and newly comeback Yumi after she had a surgery last week. This week's challenge is "Do It Yourself", where the models were paired up to make dresses using only one type of fabric with their creativity. Clafita and Sheren won the challenge and got dresses and shoes as prizes for each. The next day, the models were taken to Cikarang Dry Port and had a photo shoot wearing haute couture dress while posing in heights. A lot of models succeeded, but Audrey and Clafita struggled. At the panel, Yumi got her second best photo, while Masyitah and Clafita landed on bottom two. Clafita was saved, sending Masyitah home despite she got best photo last week.: Featured photographer: Putra Djohan; Special guests: Ari Wibowo, Richard Kyle
23–24	23–24	"The Girl Who Gets a Big Catch"	11 February 2021 12 February 2021
After Masyitah's elimination, the girls shared some of their hardships stories that they were going through in the model house, specially for Yumi. In this week's challenge, "Cardio Workout Vlog", the models were introduced to Indonesian actor, Samuel Rizal to help them to do some of cardio workout movements and recorded it for a vlog in pairs. Yumi and Gea won the challenge, each of them got a bicycle as a prize. The next day, the girls went to a fish market and met Ayu Gani to guide them, the girls wore ocean-themed headpieces for the photo shoot. At the panel, Devina became the first contestant to earn three best photos, saving her place in Top 6, while for the first time, Yumi landed on bottom two with Audrey. After an intense deliberation, the judges decided to send Audrey home, giving Yumi a place in Top 6.: Featured photographer: Ryan Tandya; Special guests: Samuel Rizal, Ayu Gani
25–26	25–26	"The Girl Who Makes the Blue Jeans Club"	20 February 2021 21 February 2021
The girls went back to model house and were given sweet treats from Indonesian TV host and radio announcer, Melaney Ricardo, after she suddenly walked in and had a chat with the models. The next day, the six remaining finalists met Luna and famous make up artist, Bubah Alfian, at the studio, to give them the "Zodiac Make Up Challenge", which won by Devina with her zodiac sign, Cancer. The girls then were taken to the forest for a family road trip photo shoot with Honda Mobilio RS and children toys as properties, with a new photographer, Mario Leander. Famous Indonesian designer, Ivan Gunawan, was present at the panel. Devina earned her fourth best photo, with Gea and Clafita landed on bottom two. After deliberation, the judges agreed that Clafita's face expression was a little off for the car advertisement and family ambience, thus eliminating her.: Featured photographer: Mario Leander; Special guests: Melaney Ricardo, Bubah Alfian, Ivan Gunawan
27–28	27–28	"The Girl Who Is a Time Bomb"	27 February 2021 28 February 2021
Gea was pissed and exploded in anger after the last elimination she was told that she can only do runway, but not photo shoot, because her face's lack of features. While Devina tried to calm her down, the girls received a Luna Mail for the next challenge, which was an "Acting Challenge" with Indonesian actor, Rezky Adhitya. Gea won the challenge and had a fine dining with Rezky as a prize, and she can take a model to join her, Gea picked Devina. On this week's editorial photo shoot, the models had to sit and hang on an aerial hoop with three different themes. Arriving home from the set, drama continues at the model house as the girls' journey reaching the end. Ilene excelled and secured her spot in Final Four, earning her second best photo. At the panel, Yumi and Sheren landed on bottom two. Yumi was saved, joining the other three models, eliminating Sheren.: Featured photographer: Ryan Tandya; Special guests: Rezky Adhitya
29–30	29–30	"The Girl Who Steals the Spotlight"	6 March 2021 7 March 2021
The next day after last week's elimination, the four finalists were relaxing at the model house, when suddenly Luna came in and brought twelve eliminated models back. Luna said that it was a comeback week and few of the eliminated models will replace the finalists. The twelve models were allowed to stay at the model house again for the rest of the week. This week's challenge for the eliminated models was a robotic-themed runway that split into four teams, while the remaining four finalists joined Luna Maya and Panca Makmun to give their opinions. Ranti, Grace, and Sheren won the challenge. The photo shoot took place in a beauty salon. The remaining contestants were put in four groups of four and had to shoot with the eliminated girls. At the panel, Luna announced that the top four will be safe, and she only evaluated the rest. As Luna called names of the eliminated contestants that failed to return, Sheren, Ranti, and Grace excelled and became the top three. After deliberation, Ranti and Grace were given a chance to return, joining the final four.: Featured photographer: Mario Ardi
31–32	31–32	"The Girl Who Gets Praised by Tyra"	13 March 2021 14 March 2021
Grace and Ranti came back to the model house, becoming ones of the six finalists. The girls then surprised when Andreas Zhu came in and announced that they will undergo a second makeover. The next day, the girls shot their compcards for the big challenge of the week, which was "Go Sees". They had to meet three designers that represented three big brands, including Jeffrey Tan, Wong Hang, and Danjyo Hiyoji collections. Yumi and Gea were declared as the winners since they booked the most, and got dress collections and vouchers as prizes. Later on, they got a chance to talk and have a chat with Indonesian actress, Ussy Sulistiawaty. This week's photo shoot was replaced by TV commercial and the girls had to be spies and bad girls on a mission for Honda Civic Hatchback RS. Ranti, Yumi, and Gea were the bad girls, while Ilene, Devina, and Grace were the spies. At the panel, Indonesian actress, Nagita Slavina, came in as a guest judge. Most of the contestants didn't look good and failed at the commercial, specially Ilene and Grace, despite she was being commented and praised by Tyra Banks on her Instagram. They landed on bottom two, but the judges saved Ilene, eliminating Grace.: Featured photographer: Geri Laksamana (challenge); Special guests: Andreas Zhu, Jeffrey Tan, Stephen Wongso, Danjyo Hiyoji, Ussy Sulistiawaty, Nagita Slavina
33–34	33–34	"The Girl Who Makes Everyone Emotional"	18 March 2021 19 March 2021
The remaining finalists got a Luna Mail as soon as they arriver at the model house, the announcement said that the girls will go to Anyer as a local beach destination, replacing the international one due to the pandemic. The next day, the girls arrived at their new model villa and immediately got a weekly challenge, "Touring Guide", where they had to promote the coast of Anyer and the water sports activities with the help of Indonesian actor, Dimas Beck. Gea won the challenge and as a prize, she had dinner at the near fine dining, got a chance to pick one more model, which was Ranti, and had a conversation with Luna about tips and tricks for modeling and photo shoots. Still at Anyer, the girls then were taken to a nearby sea cave to shoot their next photo shoot, which was portraying moody women in red gowns on the reefs, and they were shot by famous Indonesian photographer known as "Riomotret". At the panel, Ilene and Yumi expressed their emotional thoughts in their life for the first time on the show, meanwhile both Ilene's photo along with Ranti, were deemed the most beautiful on that week. Ranti showed her consistency after comeback, earning her first best photo. Again, Gea and Yumi were on the bottom two, and it was Yumi's time to say goodbye, making everyone on set emotional of her farewell.: Featured photographer: Rio Wibowo; Special guests: Dimas Beck
35–36	35–36	"The Girl Who Embraces Their Dark Side"	25 March 2021 26 March 2021
Back to the model house, the remaining finalists were emotional about Yumi's elimination, except for Devina. The next day, Patricia Gouw came in and brought a special guest, which was an expert of mind and emotional healing, Adjie Santosoputro. After some deep conversations with Adjie, the models were given shirts and Patricia told them to just freely express their feelings and emotions into the shirts using markers. And not for long, the girls immediately met with Indonesian singer who just recently put out a new song "Buka Hati (Open Your Heart)", Yura Yunita, and their challenge was to be models that can express their deepest feelings and loving themselves in Yura's video clip using their homemade shirts. After the challenge, the models were given another surprise which was they met with their loved ones (family and friends). Devina won the challenge, and as a prize, she took her boyfriend in a romantic dinner, despite their complicated relationship. This week's photo shoot determined the final three who will fight their way to become the first Indonesia's Next Top Model, with an acroyoga black angels theme. As an extra prize, Devina got a chance to see one of the girls' photo session, whom she picked Ilene. Later on, another Indonesian famous singer, Andien, joined the panel. Ilene got her third first call-out, becoming the first finalist, with Gea on second. Devina landed on bottom two for the first time with Ranti. It was revealed that Devina became the third finalist, sending Ranti home.: Featured photographer: Christ Messakh; Special guests: Adjie Santosoputro, Yura Yunita, Fajar Putra, Andien
37–38	37–38	"The Girl Who Got a Bad Salsa"	1 April 2021 2 April 2021
This semifinal week, the final three went to a talk show studio, and they were introduced to Indonesian actor and presenter, Indra Herlambang, by Patricia, where they had a one-on-one interview with Indra as a challenge, "The Talk Show". Indra gave the models trick questions to see how they handle the interview. Gea has the best skills in answering interview questions and she won the challenge. The girls arrived in model house after the challenge, and as they reached final, some misunderstandings happened between them. For the next commercial shoot, the final three were paired up with Honda HR-V as the winner's main prize, and had to advertise the car in a matador theme. Not only that, they were given more challenges to do a salsa dance in one of the scene. Ilene proved the judges that she came to win the title, as she got her fourth first call-out, and became the first finalist in next week's Grand Final. Devina and Gea landed on bottom two, but Luna handed the last photograph to Gea, placing Devina on third place of the season, and saying that she and the judges already proud and applaud her for coming this far and with four best photos, Devina went home with pride and honour.: Featured director: Dita Mentariningtyas; Special guests: Indra Herlambang
39–40	39–40	"The First Indonesia's Next Top Model is..."	8 April 2021 9 April 2021
The two finalists were surprised by the sudden appearance of their family at the model house, and had some conversations later on. The next day, they faced their final photo shoot and the big challenge, which was final runway. The final photo shoot took place in a 15°C Kawah Putih crater lake while wearing avant-garde designs by Sebastian Gunawan. The finalists once again met with an international makeup artist which he also did the makeup of all contestants of America's Next Top Model Cycle 20 back in 2013, Bubah Alfian, and had their makeup done, then they were shot by one of Indonesian famous photographer that participated on Asia's Next Top Model Cycle 2, Nicoline Patricia. Both Ilene and Gea did amazing and produced some stunning photos, despite Gea had a nose bleed mid-photo shoot. The finalists also got a chance to have dinner together alongside the judges as a prize for making into the final. Due to COVID-19 pandemic, the final runway didn't feature all of the former contestants, instead only Ranti, Yumi, Audrey, Eveline, and Ilmi that joined Ilene and Gea. Indonesian EDM group, Weird Genius, singers Novia Bachmid and Prince Husein came as the runway accompaniment. The final runway took an "Ethnical Dresses" as well as "Night Gowns" as themes while wearing amazing traditional headpieces. The final judging took place immediately after the runway, and based on the overall performances throughout the cycle, Ilene was crowned Indonesia's Next Top Model, with Gea finished as runner-up.: Featured photographer: Nicoline Patricia Malina; Special guests: Bubah Alfian, Weird Genius, Novia Bachmid, Prince Husein

== Results ==
=== Call-out order ===
Order	Episodes																			
Order	2 (Note: In episode 2, Indira was originally eliminated, but was saved.)	4	6	8	10	12 (Note: In episode 12, Clafita and Eveline's pair tied for a joint first call-out.)	14 (Note: In episode 14, Audrey and Grace landed in the bottom two and neither of them were eliminated.)	16	18	20 (Note: In episode 20, Yumi was absent at panel due to her condition after gastrointestinal infection surgery, but was declared safe from elimination.)	22	24	26	28	30 (Note: In episode 30, all sixteen contestants were present at panel. The remaining four finalists were safe that week, while the twelve eliminated contestants were judged individually. They were revealed in groups of three from the worst to best until Grace and Ranti were revealed as the contestants to return to the competition.)	32	34	36	38	40
1	Sheren	Indira	Gea	Devina	Audrey	Eveline; Clafita	Yumi	Ilene	Devina	Masyitah	Yumi	Devina	Devina	Ilene	Devina; Gea; Ilene; Yumi	Gea	Ranti	Ilene	Ilene	Ilene
2	Ilene	Eveline	Indira	Audrey	Yumi	Eveline; Clafita	Devina	Sheren	Yumi	Ilene	Sheren	Ilene	Yumi	Devina	Devina; Gea; Ilene; Yumi	Ranti	Ilene	Gea	Gea	Gea
3	Devina	Devina	Devina	Flores	Devina	Ilene	Masyitah	Devina	Sheren	Yumi	Devina	Clafita	Ilene	Gea	Devina; Gea; Ilene; Yumi	Devina	Devina	Devina	Devina	
4	Shania	Ilene	Ilene	Ilmi	Flores	Devina	Sheren	Yumi	Ilene	Gea	Gea	Gea	Sheren	Yumi	Devina; Gea; Ilene; Yumi	Yumi	Gea	Ranti		
5	Grace	Sheren	Grace	Gea	Eveline	Audrey	Clafita	Audrey	Masyitah	Clafita	Audrey	Sheren	Gea	Sheren	Grace; Ranti	Ilene	Yumi			
6	Ranti	Yumi	Ilmi	Ilene	Ranti	Yumi	Ilene	Grace	Clafita	Devina	Ilene	Yumi	Clafita		Grace; Ranti	Grace				
7	Gea	Clafita	Sheren	Clafita	Ilene	Sheren	Eveline	Masyitah	Audrey	Audrey	Clafita	Audrey								
8	Yumi	Gea	Yumi	Grace	Clafita	Flores	Gea	Clafita	Gea	Sheren	Masyitah									
9	Masyitah	Flores	Eveline	Yumi	Grace	Masyitah	Flores	Gea	Eveline	Eveline										
10	Ilmi	Ranti	Flores	Ranti	Gea	Gea	Audrey; Grace	Eveline	Grace											
11	Audrey	Masyitah	Masyitah	Sheren	Masyitah	Grace	Audrey; Grace	Flores												
12	Flores	Ilmi	Audrey	Eveline	Sheren	Ranti														
13	Eveline	Grace	Clafita	Masyitah	Ilmi															
14	Clafita	Shania	Ranti	Indira																
15	Kian	Audrey	Shania																	
16	Indira	Kian																		

The contestant won the competition
The contestant was immune from elimination
The contestant returned to the competition
The contestant was part of a non-elimination bottom twO
The contestant was eliminated
The contestant was originally eliminated but was saved
The contestant was absent at elimination and was safe

=== Bottom two ===
Episode	Contestants			Eliminated
2	Indira	&	Kian	None
4	Audrey	&	Kian	Kian
6	Ranti	&	Shania	Shania
8	Indira	&	Masyitah	Indira
10	Ilmi	&	Sheren	Ilmi
12	Grace	&	Ranti	Ranti
14	Audrey	&	Grace	None
16	Eveline	&	Flores	Flores
18	Eveline	&	Grace	Grace
20	Eveline	&	Sheren	Eveline
22	Clafita	&	Masyitah	Masyitah
24	Audrey	&	Yumi	Audrey
26	Clafita	&	Gea	Clafita
28	Sheren	&	Yumi	Sheren
30	Comeback Episode			
32	Grace	&	Ilene	Grace
34	Gea	&	Yumi	Yumi
36	Devina	&	Ranti	Ranti
38	Devina	&	Gea	Devina
40	Gea	&	Ilene	Gea

The contestant was eliminated after their first time in the bottom two.
The contestant was eliminated after their second time in the bottom two.
The contestant was eliminated after their third time in the bottom two.
The contestant was eliminated after their fourth time in the bottom two.
The contestant was eliminated and placed as the runner-up/s.

=== Average call-out order ===
Comeback episode are not included.

Rank by average	Place	Model	Call-out total	Number of call-outs	Call-out average
1	3	Devina	48	18	2.67
2	1	Ilene	61	19	3.21
3	5	Yumi	71	16	4.44
4	2	Gea	97	19	5.10
5	7	Sheren	72	14	6.14
6	8	Clafita	90	13	6.92
7	4	Ranti	65	9	7.22
8	9	Audrey	88	12	7.33
9	11	Eveline	77	10	7.70
10	10	Masyitah	88	11	8.00
11-12	12	Flores	66	8	8.25
11-12	14	Indira	33	4	8.25
13	6	Grace	83	10	8.30
14	13	Ilmi	45	5	9.00
15	15	Shania	33	3	11.00
16	16	Kian	31	2	15.50

=== Photo / video shoot guide ===
- Episode 2 photo shoot: Rock climbing couture
- Episode 4 photo shoot: Fierce posing with Honda Civic Type R
- Episode 6 commercial: Cruise ship party girls for Ellips Hair Vitamins on Jakarta Phinisi
- Episode 8 photo shoot: Graffiti street style on rollerskates with Jerome Kurnia
- Episode 10 photo shoot: Tough and elegant with Honda CR-V on fire runway
- Episode 12 photo shoot: Wild jewelries with snakes in pairs
- Episode 14 photo shoot: Underwater beauty in haute couture dress
- Episode 16 photo shoot: Colour paint splashing
- Episode 18 photo shoot: Self style and jumping on a trampoline with Honda Brio
- Episode 20 commercial: Equestrian horse girl for Ellips Dry shampoo
- Episode 22 photo shoot: Posing on a scaffold wearing tulle gowns
- Episode 24 photo shoot: Ocean-themed headpieces for Queen of Fish market
- Episode 26 photo shoot: Family road trip with Honda Mobilio RS
- Episode 28 photo shoot: Aerial hoop editorial
- Episode 30 photo shoot: Girls in beauty salon with previously eliminated contestants
- Episode 32 photo shoot: Espionage on a mission for Honda Civic Hatchback RS
- Episode 34 photo shoot: Moody women in red gowns at Anyer reefs
- Episode 36 photo shoot: Acroyoga black angels
- Episode 38 commercial: Salsa torero in matador arena with Honda HR-V
- Episode 40 photo shoot: Avant-garde designs at Kawah Putih crater lake

=== Makeovers ===
After the comeback episode, the remaining six finalists got a second makeover. Before the comeback episode, Ranti already got eliminated, and while outside the competition, she cut her hair boyish short style. Thus, she didn't have to get a second makeover.

Contestant	First makeover	Second makeover
Audrey	Blunt tips with front bangs	
Clafita	Dyed jet black with unsymmetrical tips	
Devina	Wavy shoulder-length weave with side fringe	Bob cut
Eveline	Dyed dark brown and shoulder-length cut	
Flores	Straightened shoulder-length cut with blunt tips	
Gea	Kimmy Jayanti inspired bob cut	Trimmed with edgy cut
Grace	Trimmed and voluminous curly weave	Straightened and wavy side
Ilene	Dyed chesnut and side weave	Greyish blonde ombre with side curls
Ilmi	Boyish pixie cut and dyed jet black	
Indira	Cleopatra inspired bowl cut and dyed jet black	
Masyitah	Wavy weave and side fringe	
Ranti	Wavy and curly bob cut	
Shania	Layered ash gray ombre with shoulder-length weave	
Sheren	Straightened with wavy long hair	
Yumi	Wavy shoulder-length cut with side bangs	Chesnut highlights with wavy side

== See also ==
- Indonesia's Next Top Model
- Indonesia's Next Top Model (cycle 2)
- Indonesia's Next Top Model (cycle 3)
