= Indonesia's Next Top Model =

Indonesian reality television series

- Also known as: INTM
- Genre: Reality television; Talent show
- Created by: Tyra Banks
- Presented by: Luna Maya
- Judges: Luna Maya; Deddy Corbuzier; Patricia Gouw; Panca Makmun; Ivan Gunawan; Ayu Gani
- Opening theme: I Wanna Be On Top
- Ending theme: I Wanna Be On Top
- Original languages: Indonesian; English
- No. of seasons: 3
- No. of episodes: 120 (list of episodes)

Production
- Running time: 60 minutes
- Production company: CBS Media Ventures

Original release
- Network: NET. (2020–2023); Netverse (2022–2023)
- Release: November 28, 2020 – March 26, 2023

Related
- America's Next Top Model; Asia's Next Top Model

Indonesia's Next Top Model (abbreviated as INTM) is an Indonesian reality television series based on Tyra Banks' America's Next Top Model, which features a group of young women who compete for the title of "Indonesia's Next Top Model" and a chance to begin their career in the modeling industry. The series began to air on NET. starting from November 28, 2020.

== Search for contestants ==
An extensive online search takes place for the selection process. Models of Indonesian descent or nationality are all allowed to apply, but they must be able to speak and write in English and Indonesian. All applicants are required to be at least 16 and no older than 27 years of age, and at least 5 ft 6 in (1.68 m) tall. Contestants who have previously participated in another Top Model franchise can still apply for the competition as long as they were not the winner, and are not currently under contractual obligations with an agency or endorsing any product or brand.

== Format ==
Show logo used for cycles 1-2

Each season of Indonesia's Next Top Model has about 40 regular episodes, with a special recap episode which airs near the end of each season. Each season generally begins with 16-18 contestants. Contestants are judged weekly on their overall appearance, participation in challenges, and their best photo or video from that week's photo or video shoot.

Each episode, one contestant is eliminated, though in rare cases a double elimination or non-elimination was given by consensus of the judging panel. Makeovers are given to contestants early in the season (usually after the first elimination) and a trip to an international destination is sometimes scheduled about two-thirds of the way through the season.

=== Differences from America's Next Top Model ===
In contrast the American version, the contestants receive instruction from a mentor who helps coach them in various aspects of the modelling industry and acts as a general assistant during photo shoots and challenges. The Indonesian version also airs twice a week instead of once a week like America.

=== Connection with Asia's Next Top Model ===
Indonesia's Next Top Model participants has been mentored or judged by former Indonesian representatives of Asia's Next Top Model. Patricia Gouw, runner-up of Asia's Next Top Model cycle 4 served as judge in the first cycle, while Ayu Gani, the winner of Asia's Next Top Model cycle 3 and Jesslyn Lim of Asia's Next Top Model cycle 6 were added as model mentor and guest judge. Later in cycle 2, Ayu Gani served as judge, replacing Patricia Gouw from the previous cycle. In cycle 3, former contestant of Asia's Next Top Model cycle 6, Iko Bustomi, competed as a contestant.

== Judges ==
Indonesian supermodel and actress, Luna Maya, and former mentalist, Deddy Corbuzier, were added to the original panel as the host and creative consultant of the show respectively, while fashion model, Patricia Gouw, and fashion choreographer, Panca Makmun, were added to the original panel as judge, catwalk coach, and main model mentor. Ayu Gani and Jesslyn Lim, Indonesian representatives from Asia's Next Top Model, were added as model mentors throughout the first cycle. For the second and third cycle, Corbuzier and Gouw left the show and were replaced by Gani and fashion designer Ivan Gunawan, who previously judged the first cycle as a guest judge.

Judge/Mentor	Cycles		
Judge/Mentor	1 (2020-2021)	2 (2021-2022)	3 (2022-2023)
Host
Luna Maya	Main	Main	Main
Judging Panelists
Panca Makmun	Main	Main	Main
Ayu Gani	Guest	Main	Main
Ivan Gunawan	Guest	Main	Main
Deddy Corbuzier	Main		
Patricia Gouw	Main		
Nagita Slavina	Guest		
Andien	Guest		
Dave Hendrik		Guest	Recurring
Cathy Sharon		Guest	
Sophia Latjuba		Guest	
Kimmy Jayanti			Recurring
Kelly Tandiono			Guest
Asmara Abigail			Guest
Whulandary Herman			Recurring
Paula Verhoeven			Guest
Guest Model Mentors
Ayu Gani	Mentor		
Jesslyn Lim	Mentor		
Wulan Guritno		Mentor	
Della Dartyan		Mentor	
Dwi Sasono		Mentor	
Kimmy Jayanti			Mentor
Asmara Abigail			Mentor
Whulandary Herman			Mentor
Runway Coach
Panca Makmun	Main	Main	Main

== Cycles ==
Cycle	Premiere date	Winner	Runner-up	Other contestants in order of elimination	Number of contestants	Destination
1	28 November 2020	Ilene Kurniawan	Gea Lim	Kian Septavira Luberta, Shania Binti Mahir Hamdun, Indira Indirasvari Kristensen, Ilmi Arsala Alaihi, Flores Cantika Timoer, Eveline Effendi Tan, Masyitah Arwin, Audrey Callista, Clafita Witoko, Sheren Simamora, Grace Savior Innochintya Lesbasa, Yumi Kwandy, Ranti Kusuma Putri, Devina Bertha	16	Anyer
2	4 November 2021	Sarah Tumiwa	Helen Hiu	Gisela Martha Olesen, Ayu Nisa Nurfitri, Aziza Alhafiz, Aurel Vida Oriana, Yolanda Wenur & Marissa Lorylin Widjaja, Sitta Novita Sapulete, Tiffany Zhu Mei-Lan, Chainia Lovera Lilipaly, Nita Oktarina Pangestu, Alfi Alifia Alhamid, Evanny Wityo, Jolie Iskandar, Audya Ananta, Peace Jemima Okechukwu Nnatuanya, Faradina Amalia Medina	18	Lampung
3	5 November 2022	Iko Bustomi	Paula Andrea Soesanto	Coco Callista, Michelle Kerdijk, Trixie Theola, Shynka Kyrie Agathalia (quit), Intan Rachma, Kezia Santano, Raisa Almira Rusmansyah, Fey Hagania Sandi Zendrato, Shalfa Putri Raihan, Olivia Pramaisella, Denissa Advenetta Pinem, Vannes Vannesa, Monica Bajunaid, Berlian Aura Yasarah Lubis, Nathalie Kezia Susilo, Marella Mulwanto	18	None

== Controversies ==
=== Remarks about mental health ===
During a judging panel in cycle 1, Ilene (who later won the cycle) shared her battle with depression and eating disorder in response to Luna Maya’s question about her photoshoot concept in Anyer beach. Deddy Corbuzier then cut off Ilene’s story by saying "Depression? [...] You’re pretty, you’re a model. You’re also tall, sexy, and smart. If you’re depressed, you’re insulting the martabak (stuffed pancake) vendor in front of my house.” Luna also said "I really like eating, so [do I have an] eating disorder?"

These remarks were met with backlash from the viewers and general public who believed their remarks were obtuse and insensitive to the issue of mental disorder. Videos of their remarks went viral on social media, in which many took to Twitter and Instagram to express their disapproval and also sympathy for Ilene, including psychiatrists and celebrities, also the former Asia's Next Top Model host Nadya Hutagalung. Felicia Hutapea, the daughter of lawyer Hotman Paris Hutapea also openly criticized Luna and Deddy in her Instagram story, in which Luna responded through direct message that "everyone went through depression" and that [25-year-old Felicia] was "such a child". Luna and Deddy later apologized for their remarks through their Instagram. Those remarks subsequently were edited out from the episode in the show's official YouTube channel in response to the backlash.

=== Luna mocking Shynka for quitting ===
During an elimination in cycle 3, contestants Shynka and Kezia landed in the bottom two. Luna then revealed that Shynka is safe, leaving Kezia to be eliminated, after which Shynka tearfully declared that she'd rather quit the competition instead of continuing. She confessed that she never felt appreciated by the judges despite the amount of hard work and effort she gave during her time on the competition and she felt that she can no longer take the pressure. Luna responded, "If the judges didn't appreciate [Shynka's] hard work, [she] would've been the one eliminated" and that Shynka is the one who didn't appreciate her own ability. However, the judges let Shynka quit the competition, while Kezia was saved. Not long after the episode aired, Luna posted a vlog on YouTube where toward the end of it, she called Shynka bego (very stupid) and mocked her decision to quit. Luna then received a lot of criticism for her remarks towards Shynka in the comments section and those statements were eventually edited out from the video. Viewers were seen debating on whether Shynka's decision to quit the competition was unreasonable enough to warrant such response.

== Awards and nominations ==
Year	Award	Category	Result	Ref.
2022	Indonesian Broadcasting Commission Award 2022	Talent Event Program	Nominated	

== See also ==
- Asia's Next Top Model
