= Luna Maya =

Indonesian model and actress

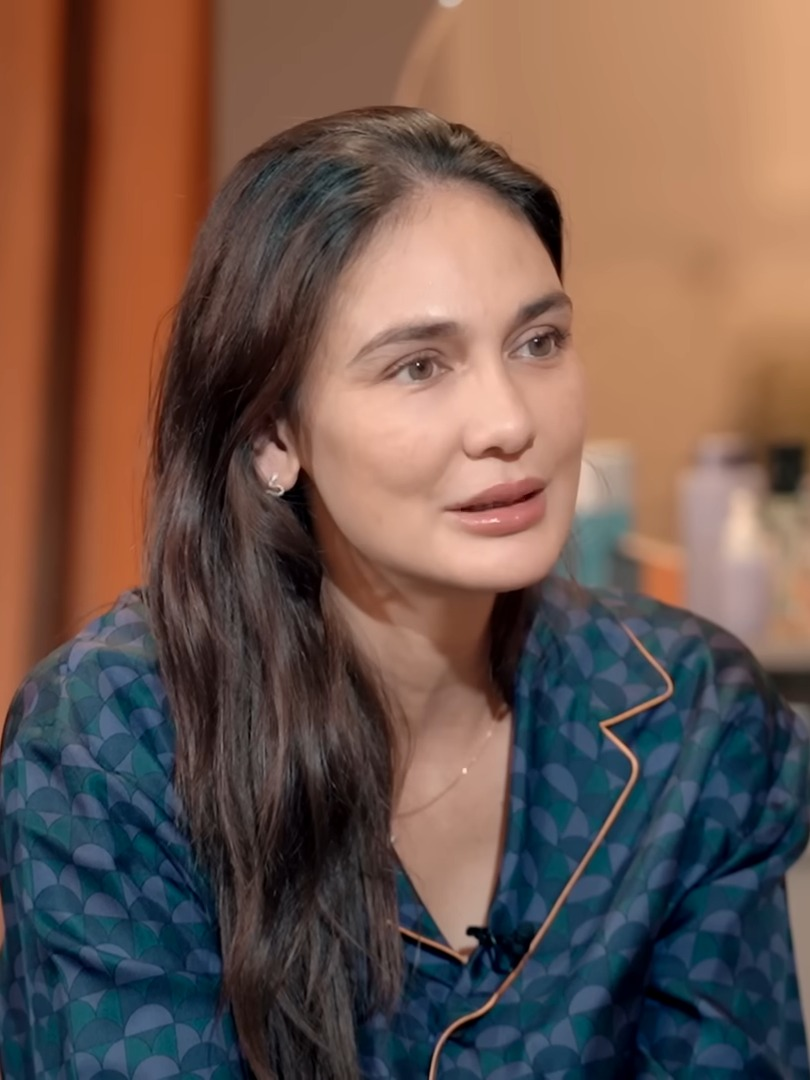
- Luna Maya in 2025
- Born: Luna Maya Sugeng; Denpasar, Bali, Indonesia
- Education: Paramadina University
- Occupations: Actress; model; presenter; singer; businesswoman
- Years active: 1999–present
- Spouse: Maxime Bouttier (m. 2025)
- Musical career
- Genre: Pop
- Instrument: Vocals
- Labels: Billboard Indonesia; Royal Prima Musikindo; Multiswara
- Website: www.itslunamaya.com

Luna Maya Sugeng is an Indonesian model, actress, and presenter of Austrian descent. She started her career as an advertising and catwalk model.

== Career ==
Luna began her career as a model. Her first acting job was a supporting role as an antagonist in the film 30 Hari Mencari Cinta (2004), for which she won praise. This was followed by a supporting role in Brownies in 2005. She has appeared in Indonesian advertising campaigns for Lux, XL and Toshiba.

She appeared in the film Cinta Silver with Rima Melati and Catherine Wilson. She also starred in Ruang, Jakarta Undercover, and Pesan Dari Surga. She received a nomination for Citra Award for Best Leading Actress at the 2006 Indonesian Film Festival. In 2008, she appeared in In the Name of Love, directed by Rudy Soedjarwo. Together with Dewi Sandra and Sandra Dewi, Luna sang on the Indonesian theme song for Euro 2008, titled "Play".

Luna has acted in the soap operas Dan, Kau Dan Aku, Ada Cinta, Rahasiaku and Anggun. She was one of the torchbearers in the 2008 Summer Olympics.

Luna collaborated with Dide Hijau Daun, vocalist of Hijau Daun on "Suara (Ku Berharap)", which became featured in Luna's film Janda Kembang.

Additionally, Luna directed an indie short film entitled Suci and The City, a music video for singer Dhea Ananda, videos of a new band called Malka, and a film, Pintu Harmonika.

In 2020, Luna was appointed as the host and judge of reality television series Indonesia's Next Top Model, which aired for three cycles until its cancellation in 2023.

Luna has become internationally known for her roles as a sundel bolong in a homage film trilogy collectively labeled Suzzanna New Generation - consisting of Suzzanna: Buried Alive (2018), Suzzanna: Santet Ilmu Pelebur Nyawa (2021), and Suzzanna: Kliwon Friday Night (2023) - remakes of horror movies starring "queen of Indonesian horror" Suzzanna.

== Personal life ==
Luna has been dating Maxime Bouttier since 2023. They officially married on 7 May 2025 at Como Shambhala Estate, Bali, Luna appeared in a long white gown decorated with flowers hanging from the straps at the back.

== Controversy ==
In 2010, Luna's boyfriend Nazril Irham (Ariel), lead singer of Indonesian pop group Peterpan (now Noah), was arrested after a pornographic video that featured Luna was posted on the internet. Ariel was sentenced to 3 1/2 years in prison in January 2011. Luna lost her contract to advertise Lux soap as a result of the scandal. Luna was declared a suspect but was not brought to trial. On 7 August 2018, the South Jakarta District Court upheld the ongoing suspect status of Luna.

== Discography ==
=== Studio album ===
- Perjalanan (2011)

=== Singles ===
Year	Title	Album	Label
2008	"Play" (feat. Dewi Sandra & Sandra Dewi)	Non-album single	Billboard Indonesia
2009	"Suara (Ku Berharap)" (feat. Dide Hijau Daun)	Ost. Janda Kembang	Sony Music Entertainment Indonesia
2009	"Menuju Surga-Mu"	Non-album single	Sony Music Entertainment Indonesia
2010	"Tak Bisa Bersamamu"	Perjalanan	Royal Prima Musikindo
2011	"Biarlah" (feat. Killing Me Inside)	Perjalanan	Royal Prima Musikindo
2012	"Sudah Biasa"	Non-album single	Multiswara
2014	"Paranoid" (feat. AC Mizal)	Non-album single	Sony Music Entertainment

=== Music video ===
Year	Title	Artist
1999	"Satu Yang Pasti"	Cool Colors
2000	"Sahabat Sejati"	Sheila on 7
2000	"Yang Tak Pernah Bisa Mencintaimu"	Naff
2004	"Kisah Kita T'lah Usai"	Ello
2004	"Aku Harus Pergi"	Ari Lasso
2004	"Arti Cinta"	Ari Lasso
2004	"Cinta Suci"	Ressa Herlambang
2005	"Kisah Romantis"	Glenn Fredly
2005	"You Are My Everything"	Glenn Fredly
2007	"Ketika Semua Harus Berakhir"	Naff
2007	"Gantung"	Melly Goeslaw
2007	"EGP (Emang Gue Pikirin)"	MAIA
2008	"P.U.S.P.A"	ST 12
2009	"Hancur Hatiku"	Olga Syahputra
2009	"Sobat"	Shinobi
2009	"Kau"	Pilar
2009	"Aku Masih Mencintaimu"	Matera
2011	"Angel"	F.O.S
2012	"Jangan Ngarep"	Setia Band
2013	"Hidup Tapi Mati"	D'Bagindas

== Filmography ==
=== Film ===
Year	Title	Role	Notes
2004	30 Hari Mencari Cinta	Barbara	Supporting role
2005	Brownies	Astrid	Cameo
2005	Bangsal 13	Mina	Lead role Nominated – 2005 MTV Indonesia Movie Awards for Most Favorite Actress
2005	Cinta Silver	Sisil	Lead role
2006	Ekspedisi Madewa	Cameo	
2006	Ruang	Kinasih	Lead role Nominated – 2006 MTV Indonesia Movie Awards for Most Favorite Actress; Nominated – Citra Award for Best Female Leading Role at the 2006 Indonesian Film Festival; Nominated – 2007 Indonesian Movie Awards for Best Actress; Nominated – 2007 Indonesian Movie Awards for Favorite Actress
2006	Jakarta Undercover	Vicky	Lead role Nominated – 2007 Festival Film Bandung for Best Female Leading Role
2006	Pesan Dari Surga	Canting	Lead role BNN Awards; Nominated – 2007 MTV Indonesia Movie Awards for Most Favorite Actress
2007	Coklat Stroberi	Casting Girl 1	Cameo
2007	Maya, Raya, Daya	Maya/Raya/Daya	Lead role Short movie Special Entry for 2006 Busan International Film festival
2008	Love	Tere	Lead role
2008	In the Name of Love	Rianti	Supporting role
2008	Cinlok	Nayla	Lead role
2009	Asmara Dua Diana	Diana Wulandari	Lead role
2009	Janda Kembang	Selasih/Asih	Lead role Nominated – 2010 Anugerah Musik Indonesia for Best Original Soundtrack (for the song "Suara (Ku Berharap)" feat. Dide Hijau Daun)
2010	Ratu Kosmopolitan	Gina	Lead role
2010	Nathalie's Instinct	Nathalie	Lead role Short movie
2011	My Blackberry Girlfriend	Angel	Lead role
2012	Hi5teria	Farah	Segment: "Kotak Musik"
2012	Cinta di Saku Celana	Actress Film	Cameo
2014	Killers	Dina Aditya	Supporting role
2014	Princess, Bajak Laut dan Alien		Supporting role
2014	Tembus	Marylia	Malaysian film
2018	Suzzanna: Buried Alive	Suzzanna	Lead role
2023	Suzzanna: Kliwon Friday Night	Suzzanna	Lead role
2024	Sumala	Sulastri	Lead role
2025	Sukma	Arini	Lead role
2026	Suzzanna: Witchcraft	Suzzanna	Lead role

=== Television ===
Year	Title	Role	Notes	Network
2004	Di Sini Cinta Pertama Kali Bersemi		Supporting role	Indosiar
2004–2005	Cinta Memang Gila		Supporting role	RCTI
2004–2005	Dan	Mermaid queen	Supporting role	RCTI
2005	Kau dan Aku	Mila	Lead role	RCTI
2005	Rahasiaku	Sherly	Lead role	RCTI
2005	Cinema-Cinema	Herself		RCTI
2006	Dunia Tanpa Koma	Marita	Supporting role	RCTI
2006–2007	Ada Cinta			Indosiar
2007	Anggun	Anggun	Lead role	SCTV
2007	Cahaya Surga		Lead role	SCTV
2007	Sujudku	Anissa		SCTV
2007–2008	Saatnya Kita Sahur	Herself	Ramadhan comedy variety show	Trans TV
2007–2008	Akhir Cinta	Dinna	Lead role	Astro Aruna
2007–2009	Extravaganza	Herself	Variety show	Trans TV
2008	Yasmin		Lead role	RCTI
2008–2010; 2012–2014	Dahsyat	Herself	Host	RCTI
2009	Dewi	Lila	Lead role	RCTI
2009	Cinta Nia	Luna	Supporting role	SCTV
2009	OB Shift 2	Sukma Lusi Rukmini	Supporting role	RCTI
2009	Dahsyatnya Sahur	Host		RCTI
2009	Republik Cinta Midnite	Host		TPI
2009	Santai Bareng Yuk	Host	Comedy show	ANTV
2009	Sambil Buka Yuk	Host	Ramadhan comedy show	ANTV
2009–2010	Cinta dan Anugerah	Luna	Supporting role	RCTI
2009–2010	The Promotor	Host		Trans TV
2011	Inbox	Guest host		SCTV
2011	Nada Cinta	Susan	Supporting role	Indosiar
2012	Hitzteria	Herself	Reality show	Indosiar
2012	Pesbukers	Herself	Comedy variety show	ANTV
2012	Dewi Bintari	Dewi Bintari	Lead role	MNCTV
2013	Tendangan Si Madun 3	Mariam	Lead role	MNCTV
2013	Sahurnya OVJ	Guest	Ramadhan comedy show	Trans 7
2013–2014	Campur-Campur	Guest	Talkshow	ANTV
2013–2014	Maharaja Lawak Mega	Guest		Astro Warna; Mustika HD
2013–2014	Putri Duyung	Maya	Supporting role	MNCTV
2014	Super Deal	Guest		ANTV
2014	Cakep-Cakep Sakti	Venus fairy	Lead role	MNCTV
2014	Panah Asmara Arjuna	Herself		ANTV
2019	It's Showtime Indonesia	Host	Comedy variety talent show	MNCTV
2020–2023	Indonesia's Next Top Model	Host	Modelling reality show	NET
2023	The Talent Agency	Herself	Episode: "Luna"	Disney+ Hotstar

=== Film television ===
Year	Title	Role	Notes
2010	Pacarku Bidadari Jutek	Regi	Lead role
2011	From Medan With Love		
2011	Demi Silvy Kurela Jadi Babysitter	Silvy	Lead role
2012	Sekali Jatuh 2x Cinta	Jessica	Lead role

== TV commercials ==
Year	Title	Role
TBA	Silver Queen	Herself
TBA	Red-A	Herself
TBA	McDonald's	Herself
TBA	Gudang Garam Merah	Herself
TBA	Impressions	Herself
TBA	Cussons Imperial Leather	Herself
TBA	Batik Keris	Herself
2005	Sunsilk Silky Straight	Herself
2006–2010, 2025	Lux	Herself
2006	Zestea	Herself
2006	Holisticare Ester C	Herself
2007	Harper's Bazaar	Herself
2007	Sarimi	Herself
2007	Astro Aruna	Herself
2007–2010	Bu Krim Detergent	Herself
2007–2010	Vitalong C	Herself
2008	MGO (My Green Oil)	Herself
2008	Kapanlagi.com	Herself
2008	Astro Xpresi Channel Id	Herself
2008–2010	XL	Herself
2008–2010	Sepatu Bata	Herself
2008–2010	Notebook Toshiba	Herself
2008–2010	Toshiba REGZA	Herself
2009	Elegant Gold	Herself
2009–2010	Mercedes-Benz	Herself
2009–2010	Tora Bika Oke!	Herself
2010	MiGelas	Herself
2010	Makarizo Hair Recovery	Herself
2011	iLexus	Herself
2012	AXE	Herself
2013	Magnum	Herself

== Awards and nominations ==
- 1999:
  - No. 3 Cover Girl Aneka Yess! 1999
- 2005:
  - EO Avante dan E-motion Entertainment Inspiring Women Awards sector modeling category Best Face
  - Nomine MTV Indonesia Movie Awards 2005 category Most Favorite Actress in film Bangsal 13
  - Duty UN for WFP Indonesia
- 2006:
  - Bintang Potensial 2006 version tabloid Bintang Indonesia
  - Icon Ekslusif LUX 2006
  - Nomine MTV Indonesia Movie Awards 2006 category Most Favourite Actress in film Ruang
  - Nomine Citra Award category The main character best Woman in film Ruang at Festival Film Indonesia 2006
- 2007:
  - Nomine Indonesian Movie Awards 2007 category The main character best actress in film Ruang
  - Nominasi Indonesian Movie Awards 2007 kategori Pemeran Utama Wanita Terfavorit dalam film Ruang
  - Nominasi Festival Film Bandung 2007 kategori Lakon Utama Wanita Terpuji dalam film Jakarta Undercover
  - Nominasi MTV Indonesia Movie Awards 2007 kategori Most Favourite Actress dalam film Pesan Dari Surga
  - Duta Astro untuk saluran Astro Aruna 2007
  - Duta Asma Indonesia 2007
  - The Most Sexiest Female in Indonesia 2007 (#3 di dunia) versi majalah FHM
  - Bintang Iklan Wanita Terfavorit 2007 versi responden DetEksi Jawa Pos
- 2008:
  - Torchbearers 2008 Summer Olympics
  - Duta Besar Produk Toshiba Indonesia
  - No. 5 Artis terkaya Indonesia 2008 versi majalah Globe Asia
  - Duta WWF Indonesia 2008
  - Nominasi Nickelodeon Indonesia Kids' Choice Awards 2008 kategori Artis Wanita Favorit
  - !nsert Anniversary Awards 2008 kategori Most Sexiest Female Celebrity
  - Aktris Layar Lebar Terfavorit 2008 versi responden DetEksi Jawa Pos
  - Bintang Iklan Wanita Terfavorit 2008 versi responden DetEksi Jawa Pos
  - The Most Beautiful Woman in Indonesia 2008 versi Stop Magazine
- 2009:
  - Nickelodeon Indonesia Kids' Choice Awards 2009 kategori Artis Wanita favorit
  - Nominasi Nickelodeon Indonesia Kids' Choice Awards 2009 kategori Pembawa Acara Favorit
  - Nominasi Panasonic Awards 2009 kategori Aktris Terfavorit
  - Nominasi Panasonic Awards 2009 kategori Presenter Musik Variety Show terfavorit
  - !nsert Anniversary Award 2009 kategori We Love to Hate Artist
  - Rolling Stone Editors’ Choice Awards 2009 kategori The Sensational Artist of the Year
  - Artis Tersilet 2009 versi Silet RCTI
  - Bintang Paling Berkilau 2009 versi tabloid Bintang Indonesia
  - Bintang Indonesia 2009 versi tabloid Bintang Indonesia
  - Aktris Layar Lebar Terfavorit 2009 versi responden DetEksi Jawa Pos
