= List of Indonesian films =

A list of films produced in Indonesia by year of release. For films produced before 1950, see List of films of the Dutch East Indies.

== 1950s ==
Title	Director	Cast	Genre	Notes
1950
Darah dan Doa	Usmar Ismail			
1951
Akibat		Awaludin		
Enam Djam Di Djogdja	Usmar Ismail			
Selamat Berdjuang, Masku!	H Asby	Raden Sukarno and Marlia Hardi		
1952
Pahit-Pahit Manis	L. Inata	Titien Sumarni, Chatir Harro, Turino Djunaedy, S. Poniman	Romantic comedy	
Taufan	Ali Joego			
1953
Lagu Kenangan	L. Inata	Titien Sumarni and AN Alcaff		
Lewat Djam Malam	Usmar Ismail			
1954
Pegawai Tinggi		Awaludin		
Supir Istimewa				
1955
Tamu Agung	Usmar Ismail			
Tarmina				
1956
Tiga Dara	Usmar Ismail	Chitra Dewi, Mieke Wijaya, and Indriati Iskak.		
1958
Asrama dara	Usmar Ismail			
Title	Director	Cast	Genre	Notes

== 1960s ==
Title	Director	Cast	Genre	Notes
1961
Warriors for Freedom	Usmar Ismail			Entered into the 2nd Moscow International Film Festival
1962
Badai-Selatan	Sofia W.D.			Entered into the 12th Berlin International Film Festival
Dkn 901				
Title	Director	Cast	Genre	Notes

== 1970s ==
Title	Director	Cast	Genre	Notes
1970
Ananda	Usmar Ismail			
Bernapas dalam lumpur				
1971
Beranak Dalam Kubur			Horror	
Tuan tanah Kedawung	Awaludin			
1972
Beranak dalam kubur				
Flamboyant				
Pemberang			Horror	
Ratu Ular			Horror	
Wajah Seorang Pembunuh			Horror	
1973
Cinta Pertama	Teguh Karya	Christine Hakim, Slamet Rahardjo, N. Riandiarto	Romantic-drama	
1974
Atheis				
Dikejar dosa			Horror	
Kemasukan Setan (Dukun)			Horror	
1975
Arwah Penasaran (Della)			Horror	
Penghuni Bangunan Tua			Horror	
Setan Kuburan			Horror	
1977
Al-Kautsar				
Suci Sang Primadona	Awaludin			
Badai Pasti Berlalu	Teguh Karya			
1979
Balada dua jagoan				
Gita Cinta dari SMA	Arizal	Rano Karno, Yessy Guzman		
Dr Siti Pertiwi Kembali ke Desa				
Title	Director	Cast	Genre	Notes

== 1980s ==
Title	Director	Cast	Genre	Notes
1980
Bandish				
Pintar Pintar Bodoh	Arizal	Warkop	Comedy	
Ratapan Anak Tiri 2			Drama	
1981
A Balinese Trance Seance				
Dalan lingkaran cinta				
Di Bawah Lindungan Ka'bah				
Dongkrak Antik	Arizal	Warkop	Comedy	
Dukun Lintah	Ackyl Anwari, Fred Wardy	Susanna Caecilia, Alex Kembar, A. Hamid Arief, Hendra Cipta, S. Bono, A.N. Alcaff, Wolly Sutinah, Waty Siregar	Horror	
The Furious				
Jaka Sembung			Action	a.k.a. The Warrior
Leyak				a.k.a. Mystics in Bali, Leák
Mystics in Bali	H. Tjut Djalil	Ilona Agathe Bastian, Sofia W.D.	Horror	
Srigala			Horror	
1982
Aladin dan lampu wasiat		Rano Karno		
Serbuan Halilintar	Arizal	Eva Arnaz, Barry Prima		
Bayi Ajaib			Horror	
Buaya putih			Horror	
Duel naga wulung				
Nenek Gondrong			Horror	
Pengabdi Setan	Sisworo Gautama Putra			a.k.a. Satan's Slave
Sundelbolong			Horror	a.k.a. Ghost with Hole
Serbuan halilintar				
Pasukan berani mati				
Nyi blorong				a.k.a. The Snake Queen
Djakarta 1966				
Ferocious Female Freedom Fighters				
Ferocious Female Freedom Fighters, Part 2				
1983
Cinta segi tiga				
Maju Kena Mundur Kena	Arizal	Warkop	Comedy	
Pengantin Pantai Biru	Meriam Bellina, Sandro Tobing	Drama		
Pokoknya Beres	Arizal	Warkop	Comedy	
Perhitungan terakhir				
Damarwulan				
Di Balik Kelambu	Teguh Karya	Christine Hakim; Slamet Rahardjo	Drama	
Escape from Hellhole	Maman Firmansyah	Gudi Sintara, Dicky Zulkarnaen, Siska Widowati, Ramli Ivar, Leily Sagita, Youstine Rais	Horror	co-production with Philippines
Five Deadly Angels				
1984
Bukan sandiwara				
No Time to Die				a.k.a. Hijacked to Hell
Dua Gerbong Satu	Garin Nugroho			
Golok Setan				a.k.a. The Devil's Sword
Itu Bisa Diatur	Arizal	Warkop	Comedy	
Pengkhianatan G30S/PKI	Arifin C. Noer	Amoroso Katamsi, Umar Kayam, Syubah Asa	Docudrama	
The Stabilizer	Arizal	Peter O'Brian, Craig Gavin, Gillie Beanz, Dana Christina, Harry Capry, Mark Sungkar, Yenny Faridha, Kaharuddin Syah, Linda Hussein	Action	
1985
Gantian Dong	Arizal	Warkop	Comedy	
Carok				
Cinta Kembar				
Darah Perjaka				
Doea Tanda Mata	Teguh Karya			
1986
Di Dadaku Ada Cinta				
Final Score	Arizal	Chris Mitchum, Mike Abbott, Ida Iasha, Dicky Zulkarnaen, Zainal Abidin, August Melasz, Siska Widowati, Nizar Zulmi, Ivonne Elizabeth, Andre Mathias	Action	Released in the Philippines as An Army of One, with Arizal credited as "Joseph Warner"
Ibunda	Teguh Karya		Drama	
Pengantin Baru	Arizal	Deddy Mizwar, Lydia Kandow	Romance	
1987
Ayahku				
Barang terlarang				
Bilur-bilur penyesalan				
Catatan si Boy	Nasri Cheppy	Romina Yan	Comedy	a.k.a. Juanita La Soltera
Cintaku di rumah susun				
Depan bisa belakang bisa				
Empire of the Spiritual Ninja				
Misteri Rumah Tua				
Pernikahan Berdarah			Horror	
1988
American Hunter				
Bayar tapi nyicil				
Catatan si boy 2				
Elegi buat Nana				
Lukisan Berlumuran Darah			Horror	
1989
Cinta Berdarah			Horror	
Melacak Dendam	Atok Suharto	Heru Sutanto, Widawati Natasha, Baron Hermanto, Henry Surentu	Action, Ninja Martial Arts	a.k.a. Tracking Revenge
Misteri Harta Karun			Horror	
Sepasang Mata Maut			Horror	
Tepuk Tangan	Garin Nugroho			
Title	Director	Cast	Genre	Notes

== 1990s ==
Title	Director	Cast	Genre	Notes
1990
Angkara Membara			Action	
Ajian Pamungkas			Action	
Babad Tanah Leluhur (Rahasia Bukit Tengkorak)			Action	
Balada Tiga Jagoan			Action	
Mana Bisa Tahan	Arizal	Warkop	Comedy	
Blok M	Edward Sirait	Dessy Ratnasari, Paramitha Rusady	Comedy	
Catatan si boy 3	Garbiel Corrado	Romina Yan, Laura Pausini	Drama/Teen	a.k.a. Juanita La Soltera 2
Catatan si boy 4	Marpat	Romina Yan, Christian Meier, Queen Latifah	Comedy/Teen	a.k.a. Juanita La Soltera 3
Diskotik DJ				
Djago			Action	
Double Crosser				
Gadis Pendekar			Action	
Guntur Tengah Malam			Horror	
Ilmu Cambuk Api			Action	
Jaka Sembung dan Dewi Samudra			Action	
Jaka Swara			Action	
Jaka Tuak			Action	
Jampang II			Action	
Jaringan Terlarang II			Action	
Mat Pelor			Action	
Melacak Tapak Harimau			Action	
Menantang Prahara			Action	
Misteri dari Gunung Merapi III (Perempuan Berambut Api)			Action	
Pedang Halilintar			Action	
Pedang Naga Pasa			Action	
Pemburu Nyawa			Action	
Penantang dari Gunung Naga			Action	
Pendekar Cabe Rawit			Action	
Pendekar Jagad Kelana			Action	
Pendekar Naga Mas			Action	
Pertempuran Segi Tiga			Action	
Pusaka Penyebar Maut			Action	
Putri Kembang Dadar			Action	
Rahasia Patukan Cobra			Action	
Rajawali dari Utara			Action	
Sakti Mandraguna			Action	
Satria Kapak Tutur Sepuh			Action	
Si Buta dari Gua Hantu			Action	
Si Gondrong Lawan Bek Mardjuk			Action	
Si Jalu (Dua Pendekar Putih)			Action	
Srigala Jalanan			Action	
Tembok Derita			Action	
Turangga			Action	
1991
Air dan Romi	Garin Nugroho			
Babad Tanah Leluhur II (Banyu Cakra Buana)			Action	
Badai Laut Selatan			Action	
Bang Somad Si Tangan Satu			Action	
Cakar Naga			Action	
Catatan si boy 5	Perlas Farias	Milie Stegmann, Queen Latifah.	Comedy	a.k.a. Peti Mati
Cinta Dalam Sepotong Roti	Garin Nugroho			
Daerah jagoan			Action	
Dari pintu ke pintu				
Darah pendekar			Action	
Demi Cinta Belahlah Dadaku				
Harta Karun			Action	
Jurus-Jurus Sakti			Action	
Kamandaka			Action	
Lima Harimau Nusantara			Action	
Menerjang Prahara di Komodo			Action	
Pertarungan Dahsyat			Action	
Saur Sepuh IV (Titisan Darah Biru)			Action	
Selir Adipati Gendra Sakti			Action	
Si Rawing			Action	
Suromenggolo			Action	
Tiada Titik Balik			Action	
Tutur Tinular II (Naga Puspa Kresna)			Action	
1992
Angel of Fury				
Bibir Mer				
Bidadari Berambut Emas			Action	
Dangerous Seductress				
Membela Harga Diri			Action	
Pendekar Pedang Seribu Bayangan			Action	
Saur Sepuh V (Istana Atap Langit)			Action	
Tutur Tinular III (Pendekar Syair Berdarah)'			Action	
Tutur Tinular IV (Mendung Bergulung di Atas Majapahit)			Action	
1993
Manda				
Badut-Badut kota				
Blood Warriors			Action	
Pedang Ulung			Action	
Perawan Lembah Wilis			Action	
Si Rawing II (Pilih Tanding)			Action	
Walet Merah			Action	
1994
Catatan Harian Tante Sonya				
Surat untuk Bidadari	Garin Nugroho			
Dewi angin angin			Action	
Jurus Dewa Kobra (Si Rawing III)			Action	
Macho (Masalah Cowok)			Action	
Pemburu Teroris			Action	
Selir Durgaratih			Action	
Wanita dalam Gairah			Action	
1995
Bulan Tertusuk Ilalang	Garin Nugroho			
Ceh kucak gayo				
Dongeng Kancil untuk Kemerdekaan	Garin Nugroho			
Gairah Terlarang			Action	
Macho 2 (Masalah Cowok)			Action	
Panther			Action	
Terjerumus di Lembah Hitam			Action	
1996
Bisikan nafsu				
Cinta dan nafsu				
Gadis Misterius			Horror	
Gairah Binal			Action	
Jaringan Tabu			Action	
Lampiasan Nafsu			Action	
Membakar Gairah			Action	
Pelecehan...			Action	
Selingkuh			Action	
Sex dan Kriminal			Action	
1997
Birahi Perempuan Halus			Horror	
Fatahillah	Imam Tantowi and Chaerul Umam		Historical drama	Budget Rp 3 billion; most expensive Indonesian film as of filming
Reinkarnasi			Action	
1998
Daun di Atas Bantal	Garin Nugroho			
Gairah Membara			Action	
My Family, My Films and My Nation	Garin Nugroho			
Nafsu Membara			Action	
Permainan Membara			Action	
1999
Bergairah di puncak				
The Crown Jewel of Indonesia				
Di balik pelukan laki laki				
Kuldesak				
Menentang Nafsu			Action	
Title	Director	Cast	Genre	Notes

== 2000s ==
Title	Director	Cast	Genre	Notes
2000
Angin kemarau				
Bintang jatuh				
Di antara masa lalu dan masa sekarang				
Jakarta Project			Action	
Petualangan Sherina				
Puisi Tak Terkuburkan	Garin Nugroho			
Tragedi			Action	
2001
Jelangkung				a.k.a. The Uninvited
Pasir Berbisik		Christine Hakim, Dian Sastrowardoyo		a.k.a. Whispering Sands
Layar hidup: Tanjang priok/Jakarta	Garin Nugroho			
2002
Ca-bau-kan				
Ada Apa Dengan Cinta?		Nicholas Saputra, Dian Sastrowardoyo, Titi Kamal	Drama, Romance	a.k.a. What's up with Love?
Aku Ingin Menciummu Sekali Saja	Garin Nugroho			
Andai ia tahu				
Arwah yang kembali				
The Black Magic				
Beth				
Bendera				
Beauty and Warrior				
Eliana, Eliana				
Kafir			Horror	
Peti Mati			Horror	
Rembulan di Ujung Dahan	Garin Nugroho			
2003
Arisan!				
Biarkan Bintang Menari				
Biola Tak Berdawai				
Cinta 24 karat				
Durian				
Eiffel I'm in Love				
The Soul			Horror	
Tusuk Jelangkung			Horror	
2004
30 Hari Mencari Cinta		Nirina Zubir		
Ada Hantu di Sekolah			Horror	
Bangsal 13			Horror	
Bunian			Horror	
D'Trex			Action	
Di Sini Ada Setan			Horror	
Gerbang 13			Action	
Novel Tanpa Huruf R				
Dajang Soembi, perempoean jang dikawini andjing				
Rindu Kami Padamu	Garin Nugroho			
2005
12:00 AM			Horror	
Alexandria				
Bad Wolves			Action	
Catatan Akhir Sekolah				
DeaLova				
Detik Terakhir				
Mirror			Horror	
Missing			Horror	
Panggil Namaku 3x			Horror	
Psikopat			Horror	
Virgin	Hanny R. Saputra	Laudya Cynthia Bella, Unique Priscilla, Ayu Azhari, Tio Pakusadewo		
Ketika				
Banyu Biru				
Gie				
Tentang Dia	Rudi Soedjarwo	Sigi Wimala, Fauzi Baadilla, Adinia Wirasti	Teen drama	Based on Melly Goeslaw's story of the same name
Brownies				
Janji Joni				a.k.a. Joni's Promise
Realita, Cinta, dan Rock n' Roll				
Serambi				
Apa artinya cinta?				
Belahan jiwa				
Ungu Violet				
2006
9 Naga				
Kuntilanak			Horror	a.k.a. The Chanting
Ekspedisi Madewa				
D'Girlz Begins			Action	
Dunia Lain: The Movie				
Pocong 2			Horror	
Jomblo				
Gotcha			Horror	
Hantu Jeruk Purut			Horror	
Berbagi Suami				
Cinta Pertama	Nayato Fio Nuala	Bunga Citra Lestari, Ben Joshua, Richard Kevin.		
Hantu Bangku Kosong			Horror	
Denias Senandung Di Atas Awan				
Ekskul				
Heart				
06.30				
I Love You, Om				
Jakarta Undercover				
Kejar Jakarta				
Lentera Merah			Horror	
Rumah Pondok Indah			Horror	
Roh			Horror	
Mendadak Dangdut				
Ruang				
Garasi				
Gue Kapok Jatuh Cinta				
Opera Jawa	Garin Nugroho			
Serambi	Garin Nugroho			
Rantai Bumi			Action	
2007
3 Hari Untuk Selamanya				
Anak-Anak Borobudur				
Angker Batu			Horror	
Beranak Dalam Kubur			Horror	
Bukan Bintang Biasa				
Coklat Stroberi				
D'Bijis			Comedy	
Dead Time: Kala				
Dinner at Eight				
Enam			Horror	
Film Horor			Comedy	
Genderuwo			Horror	
Get Married			Comedy	
Hantu				
Jelangkung 3			Horror	
Kamulah Satu-Satunya				
Kuntilanak 2			Horror	
Lantai 13			Horror	
Lari Dari Blora				
Lawang Sewu: Dendam Kuntilanak			Horror	
Leak			Horror	
Legenda Sundel Bolong			Horror	
Lewat Tengah Malam			Horror	
Long Road to Heaven				
Love Is Cinta				
Maaf, Saya Telah Menghamili Istri Anda			Comedy	
Malam Jum'at Kliwon			Horror	
Maskot			Comedy	
Mengejar Mas-Mas			Comedy	
Merah Itu Cinta				
Miracle			Horror	
Nagabonar Jadi 2			Comedy	
The Photograph				
Pocong 3			Horror	
Pulau Hantu			Horror	
Quickie Express			Comedy	
Sang Dewi				
Selamanya				
Suster N (Dendam Suster Ngesot)			Horror	
Suster Ngesot			Horror	
Terowongan Casablanca			Horror	
The Butterfly				
The Wall			Horror	
Tentang Cinta				
2008
40 Hari Bangkitnya Pocong			Horror	
9808 Antologi 10 Tahun Reformasi Indonesia			Comedy	
Anda Puas Saya Loyo			Comedy	
Asoy Geboy			Comedy	
Barbi3				
Basahhh...			Comedy	
Cinlok			Comedy	
Cintaku Selamanya			Comedy	
Claudia/Jasmine			Comedy	
Coblos Cinta			Comedy	
D.O. (Drop Out)			Comedy	
Gara-gara Bola			Comedy	
Hantu Aborsi			Horror	
Hantu Ambulance			Horror	
Hantu Jembatan Ancol			Horror	
Hantu Perawan Jeruk Purut			Horror	
Karma			Horror	
Kawin Kontrak			Comedy	
Kawin Kontrak Lagi			Comedy	
Kereta Hantu Manggarai			Horror	
Kesurupan			Horror	
Kuntilanak 3			Horror	
Kutunggu Jandamu			Comedy	
Laskar Pelangi	Riri Riza			
Liar	Rudi Soedjarwo		Action, Drama	
Love				
Mas Suka Mas Ukin Aja			Comedy	
MBA (Married by Accident)			Comedy	
Mepeng (Muka Pengen)			Comedy	
Merem Melek			Comedy	
Mereka Bilang, Saya Monyet!			Drama	
Namaku Dick			Comedy	
Oh Baby			Comedy	
Oh My God			Comedy	
Otomatis Romantis			Comedy	
Planet Mars			Comedy	
Pocong vs Kuntilanak			Horror	
Pulau Hantu 2			Horror comedy	
Sarang Kuntilanak			Horror	
Saus Kacang				
Setannya Kok Beneran?			Comedy	
Si Jago Merah			Comedy	
Skandal Cinta Babi Ngepet			Horror	
Sumpah Pocong di Sekolah			Horror	
Susahnya Jadi Perawan			Comedy	
Suami-Suami Takut Istri The Movie			Comedy	
Syakilah Manis				
Takut: Faces of Fear			Horror	
Tali Pocong Perawan			Horror	
Tarzan ke Kota			Comedy	
The Shaman			Horror	
The Tarix Jabrix			Comedy	
Tiren: Mati Kemaren			Horror	
Tri Mas Getir			Comedy	
Tulalit			Comedy	
XL: Extra Large			Comedy	
2009
Ai Lop Yu Pul			Comedy	
Air Terjun Pengantin			Horror	
Anak Setan			Horror	
Asmara Dua Diana			Comedy	
Benci Disko			Comedy	
Bukan Cinta Biasa			Comedy	
Bukan Malin Kundang			Comedy	
Capres (Calo Presiden)			Comedy	
Cin(T)a			Comedy	
Darah Janda Kolong Wewe			Horror	
Darah Perawan Bulan Madu			Horror	
Dikejar Setan			Horror	
Garuda di Dadaku			Drama	
Get Married 2			Comedy	
Glitch: Tersesat Dalam Waktu			Action	
Hantu Biang Kerok			Horror comedy	
Hantu Binal Jembatan Semanggi			Horror	
Hantu Jamu Gendong			Horror	
Hantu Rumah Ampera			Horror	
Jagad X Code			Comedy	
Janda Kembang			Comedy	
Jeritan Kuntilanak			Horror	
Kambing Jantan: The Movie	Rudi Soedjarwo		Comedy	
Kawin Laris			Comedy	
Kembang Perawan			Comedy	
Keramat			Horror	
Kereta Setan Manggarai			Horror	
Kirun + Adul			Comedy	
Krazy Crazy Krezy...			Comedy	
Kuntilanak Beranak			Horror	
Kuntilanak Kamar Mayat			Horror	
Kutukan Suster Ngesot			Horror	
Maling Kutang			Comedy	
Mati Suri			Horror	
Mau Dong Ah			Comedy	
Merantau			Action	
Nazar			Comedy	
Paku Kuntilanak			Horror comedy	
Perjaka Terakhir			Comedy	
Pijat Atas Tekan Bawah			Comedy	
Pintu Terlarang	Joko Anwar			
Pocong Jalan Blora			Horror	
Pocong Kamar Sebelah			Horror	
Pocong Setan Jompo			Horror	
Preman In Love			Comedy	
Punk In Love			Comedy	
Sepuluh	Henry Riady			
Serigala Terakhir			Action	
Setan Budeg			Horror comedy	
Suka Ma Suka			Comedy	
Sumpah, (Ini) Pocong			Horror	
Suster Keramas			Horror comedy	
Susuk Pocong			Horror	
Terowongan Rumah Sakit			Horror	
The Maling Kuburans			Horror comedy	
The Police			Action, Comedy	
The Real Pocong			Horror	
The Tarix Jabrix 2			Comedy	
Virgin 2	Nayato Fio Nuala	Joanna Alexandra, Christina Santika, Yama Carlos, Wichita Satari		
Wakil Rakyat			Comedy	
XXL: Double Extra Large			Comedy	
Title	Director	Cast	Genre	Notes

== 2010s ==
Title	Director	Cast	Genre	Notes
2010
18+ : True Love Never Dies			Drama	
3 Hati Dua Dunia Satu Cinta			Drama	
3 Pejantan Tanggung			Comedy drama	
7 Hati, 7 Cinta, 7 Wanita			Drama	
Affair	Nayato Fio Nuala	Sigi Wimala, Dimas Aditya, Garnetta Haruni, Monique Henri	Horror	
Akibat Pergaulan Bebas			Drama	
Aku Atau Dia			Comedy drama	
Alangkah Lucunya (Negeri Ini)			Drama	
Arisan Brondong			Comedy	
Bahwa Cinta Itu Ada			Drama	
Bebek Belur			Comedy	
Belkibolang			Drama	
Belum Cukup Umur			Drama	
Bidadari Jakarta			Drama	
Cin...Tetangga Gue, Kuntilanak!			Horror comedy	
D'Love	Helfi Kardit	Aurelie Moeremans, Agung Saga, Rebecca Reijman, Ahmad Albar, Rizki Ardianto	Drama	
Dalam Mihrab Cinta			Drama	
Dawai 2 Asmara			Musical, Drama	
Darah Garuda (Merah Putih II)			Action, War	
Demi Dewi			Drama, Action	
Dendam Pocong Mupeng			Horror comedy	
Di Bawah Langit			Drama	
Di Dasar Segalanya			Drama, Animation	
Dilema Cinta 2 Hati			Drama	
Gaby dan Lagunya			Drama	
Hantu Tanah Kusir			Horror	
Hari Untuk Amanda			Drama	
Heart 2 Heart	Nayato Fio Nuala	Irish Bella	Drama	
Istri Bo'ongan			Comedy	
I Know What You Did On Facebook			Comedy drama	
Jejak Darah			Horror	
Jinx			Comedy	
Jakarta Maghrib			Comedy drama	
Kabayan Jadi Milyuner			Comedy	
Kain Kafan Perawan			Horror	
Laskar Cilik			Musical, Children's film	
Laskar Pemimpi			Comedy	
Lihat Boleh, Pegang Jangan			Comedy	
London Virginia			Drama	
Love and Eidelweiss			Drama	
Love in Perth		Gita Gutawa	Drama	
Madame X			Comedy, Action	
Mafia Insyaf			Comedy, Action	
Melodi			Musical, Children's film	
Melody Kota Rusa			Comedy drama	
Menculik Miyabi			Comedy	
Menebus Impian			Drama	
Minggu Pagi di Victoria Park			Drama	
Nakalnya Anak Muda			Horror	
Ngebut Kawin			Comedy	
Not For Sale			Drama	
Obama Anak Menteng			Children's film	
Pemburu Hantu The Movie			Horror	
Pengakuan Seorang Pelacur			Drama	
Penganten Sunat			Comedy	
Pengantin Pantai Biru			Horror	
Pengantin Topeng			Thriller	
Perjaka Terakhir 2			Comedy, Action	
Pocong Jumat Kliwon			Horror	
Pocong Keliling			Horror comedy	
Pocong Rumah Angker			Horror	
Raped by Saitan (Diperkosa Setan)			Horror	
Rayuan Arwah Penasaran			Horror	
Red Cobex	Upi	Tika Panggabean, Sarah Sechan	Comedy	
Rintihan Kuntilanak Perawan			Horror	
Rokkap (Rongkap)			Drama	
Roman Picisan			Comedy drama	
Ratu Kostmopolitan			Comedy, Action	
Rumah Dara			Horror thriller	
Sang Pencerah			Drama	
Satu Jam Saja			Drama	
Selimut Berdarah			Thriller	
Senggol Bacok			Comedy	
Sehidup (Tak) Semati			Comedy	
Setan Facebook			Horror	
SKJ (Seleb Kota Jogja)			Comedy	
Sssstt... Jadikan Aku Simpanan			Comedy drama	
Susah Jaga Keperawanan di Jakarta			Comedy	
Sweetheart			Drama	
Tanah Air Beta			Drama	
Taring			Horror	
Te(Rekam)			Horror	
The God Babe			Comedy	
The Sexy City			Drama	
Time			Horror	
Tiran (Mati di Ranjang)			Horror	
Toilet 105			Horror	
2011
?	Hanung Bramantyo		Drama	
13 Cara Memanggil Setan	A Liong Wong	Debby Ayu, Five Vi, Ki Kusumo, HIM Damsyik, Fairly Wattimena, Ayank Merinda, Roy Saputra	Horror	
Ada Apa Dengan Pocong?			Horror	
Akibat Pergaulan Bebas 2			Drama	
Anakluh			Drama	
Arisan! 2			Comedy	
Arwah Goyang Karawang			Horror	
Ayah, Mengapa Aku Berbeda?			Drama	
Badai di Ujung Negeri			Action, Drama	
Baik Baik Sayang			Drama	
Batas			Drama	
Cahaya di Atas Cahaya			Drama	
Catatan Harian Si Boy			Drama	
Cewek Gokil			Comedy, Drama	
Cewek Saweran			Comedy	
Cowok Bikin Pusing			Comedy	
Dedemit Gunung Kidul			Horror	
Di Bawah Lindungan Ka'bah			Drama	
Euphoria			Drama	
Garuda di Dadaku 2			Drama	
Get Married 3			Comedy	
Golden Goal			Comedy	
Hati Merdeka (Merah Putih III)'			War	
Jenglot Pantai Selatan			Horror	
Kalung Jelangkung			Comedy	
Kehormatan di Balik Kerudung			Drama	
Kejarlah Jodoh Kau Kutangkap			Comedy	
Kentut			Comedy, Drama	
Kepergok Pocong			Horror comedy	
Keranda Kuntilanak			Horror	
Khalifah			Drama	
Kuntilanak Kesurupan			Horror comedy	
L4 Lupus			Drama	
Langit Biru			Musical, Drama	
Lima Elang			Adventure, Drama, Children	
Lost In Papua			Adventure, Drama	
Love Story	Hanny Saputra	Acha Septriasa, Irwansyah	Drama	
Lovely Man			Drama	
Masih Bukan Cinta Biasa			Drama	
Mata Tertutup			Drama	
Mati Muda di Pelukan Janda			Comedy	
Milli and Nathan			Drama	
Misteri Hantu Selular			Horror	
Mudik			Comedy, Drama	
Oh Tidak!			Comedy, Teen	
Pacar Hantu Perawan			Horror comedy	
Pelet Kuntilanak			Horror	
Pelukan Janda Hantu Gerondong			Horror	
Pengejar Angin	Hanung Bramantyo		Drama	
Perempuan-perempuan Liar			Comedy, Drama	
Pirate Brothers			Action	
Poconggg Juga Pocong			Comedy	
Pocong Mandi Goyang Pinggul			Horror comedy	
Pocong Minta Kawin			Horror comedy	
Pocong Ngesot			Horror comedy	
Pupus			Drama	
Purple Love			Comedy, Drama	
The Raid: Redemption	Gareth Evans		Action	Premiered in 2011 Toronto International Film Festival
Rindu Purnama			Drama, Children	
Rumah Tanpa Jendela			Musical, Drama	
Sajadah Ka'bah			Drama	
The Dancer	Ifa Isfansyah	Prisia Nasution, Nyoman Oka Antara	Drama	
Semesta Mendukung			Drama	
Serdadu Kumbang			Drama, Children	
Setannya Kok Masih Ada			Horror comedy	
Si Anak Kampoeng			Drama	
Simfoni Luar Biasa			Drama	
Skandal			Thriller, Drama	
Surat Kecil untuk Tuhan			Drama	
Suster Keramas 2			Horror	
Tarung			Action	
Tebus			Thriller	
Tendangan Dari Langit			Drama	
The Mentalist			Action, Fantasy	
The Mirror Never Lies	Kamila Andini	Atiqah Hasiholan, Reza Rahadian	Wakatobi environtmental conservation	Received an honorable mention at the Global Film Initiative in April 2011.
The Perfect House			Thriller, Drama	
The Tarix Jabrix 3			Comedy	
True Love			Drama	
Tumbal Jailangkung			Horror	
Virgin 3: Satu Malam Mengubah Segalanya			Drama	
X – The Last Moment			Action	
2012
Pulau Hantu 3	Jose Poernomo		Horror, Thriller	
Ummi Aminah	Aditya Gumay		Drama	
Mother Keder: Emakku Ajaib Bener	Eko Nobel		Comedy, Drama	
Xia Aimei	Alyandra		Drama	
My Last Love	Nayato Fio Nuala		Drama	
Kafan Sundel Bolong	Yoyok Dumprink		Horror comedy	
Kita Versus Korupsi	Emil Heradi, Lasja F. Susatyo, Ine Febriyanti, Chairun Nissa		Drama, Anthology film	
Penganten Pocong	Arie Azis		Horror comedy	
Rumah Bekas Kuburan	Irwan Siregar		Horror	
Bila	Chiska Doppert		Drama	
Malaikat Tanpa Sayap	Rako Prijanto		Drama	
Republik Twitter	Kuntz Agus		Drama	
Rumah Hantu Pasar Malam	Arie Azis		Horror	
Dilema	Rinaldy Puspoyo, Adilla Dimitri, Yudi Datau, Robert Ronny, Robby Ertanto Soediskam		Drama, Anthology film	
Seandainya	Nayato Fio Nuala	Dinda Hauw, Christ Laurent, Cut Meyriska, Rendy Kjaernett	Drama	
Keumala	Andhy Pulung		Drama	
Negeri 5 Menara	Affandi Abdul Rachman		Drama	Based on the novel of the same name
Sampai Ujung Dunia	Monty Tiwa		Drama	
Santet Kuntilanak	Koya Pagayo		Horror	
Love is Brondong	Chiska Doppert		Drama	
Hi5teria	Adriyanto Dewo, Chairun Nissa, Billy Christian, Nicho Yudifar, Harvan Agustriansyah		Horror, Thriller, Anthology film	
Love is U	Hanny R. Saputra		Drama	
Enak Sama Enak	Chiska Doppert		Comedy	
Kung Fu Pocong Perawan	Yoyok Dumprink		Horror comedy	
Sanubari Jakarta	Billy Christian, Aline Jusrina, Tika Pramesti, Lola Amaria, Kirana Larasati, Alfrits John Robert, Adriyanto Dewo, Dinda Kanyadewi, Fira Sofiana, Sim F		Drama, Anthology film	
Nenek Gayung	Nuri Dahlia		Horror comedy	
Modus Anomali	Joko Anwar		Thriller	Premiered in The South by Southwest Film Festival
Sinema Purnama	Radian Kanugroho, Andra Fembriarto, Pandu Birantoro, Ray Nayoan		Drama, Anthology film	
The Witness	Muhammad Yusuf		Drama, Thriller	
3 Pocong Idiot	Nayato Fio Nuala		Horror comedy	Based on the novel of the same name
Kuntilanak-Kuntilanak	Koya Pagayo		Horror	
Hattrick	Robert Ronny		Action, Drama	
BrokenHearts	Helfi Kardit	Julie Estelle, Reza Rahardian, Darius Sinathriya	Drama	
Kakek Cangkul	Nuri Dahlia	Herfiza Novianti, Rizky Mocil, Zidni Adam	Horror comedy	
Udin Cari Alamat Palsu	Chiska Doppert	Udin Sedunia, Sinta, Jojo, Moymoy, Palaboy	Comedy	
Sule, Ay Need You	Cuk FK	Sule, Titi Kamal, Andre Taulany	Comedy	
Mr. Bean Kesurupan Depe	Yoyok Dumprink	Dewi Persik, Doyok, Marwan XL	Horror comedy	
Soegija	Garin Nugroho	Nirwan Dewanto, Annisa Hertami, Wouter Zweers	Drama, Epic	
Perahu Kertas	Hanung Bramantyo	Maudy Ayunda, Adipati Dolken	Drama	Based on Dewi Lestari's book of the same name
Perahu Kertas 2	Hanung Bramantyo	Maudy Ayunda, Adipati Dolken, Reza Rahadian	Drama	2nd part
Di Timur Matahari	Ari Sihasale	Laura Basuki, Lukman Sardi	Drama	
Bangkit Dari Kubur	Koya Pagayo	Chika Jessica, Reymond Knuligh	Horror	
Mama Minta Pulsa	Nuri Dahlia	Nikita Mirzani, Rizky Mocil, Farida Pasha	Horror comedy	
Ambilkan Bulan	Ifa Ifansyah	Lana Nitibagaskara, Agus Kuncoro, Astri Nurdin	Drama, Musical film	
Cinta di Saku Celana	Fajar Nugros	Donny Alamsyah, Joanna Alexandra	Comedy drama	
Cinta Tapi Beda	Hanung Bramantyo	Agni Prathista, Reza Nangin	Romance-drama	
Shackled	Upi Avianto		Horror	
Bidadari-Bidadari Surga	Sony Gaokasak	Nirina Zubir, Nino Fernandez, Nadine Chandrawinata	Drama	
Potong Bebek Angsa	Alyandra & Hilman Mutasi	Olivia Jensen, Ricky Harun, Boy William	Comedy	
Habibie & Ainun	Faozan Rizal	Reza Rahadian, Bunga Citra Lestari	Drama	
5 cm	Rizal Mantovani	Herjunot Ali, Pevita Pearce, Igor Saykoji, Denny Sumargo, Raline Shah, Fedi Nuril	Drama	
2013
Coboy Junior: The Movie	Anggy Umbara	Coboy Junior, Nirina Zubir, Dewi Sandra, Meisya Siregar		
Dead Mine	Steven Shell	Ario Bayu, Joe Taslim, Mike Lewis	Action, Thriller	
Demi Ucok	Sammaria Simanjuntak	Geraldine Sianturi, Mak Gondut	Comedy	
3 Playboy Galau	Dede Ferdinand	Okan Kornelius, Aditya Rino, Ricky Perdana	Comedy	
Gending Sriwijaya	Hanung Bramantyo	Julia Perez, Agus Kuncoro, Sahrul Gunawan, Mathias Muchus	Action, Drama	
Mika	Lasja F. Susatyo	Velove Vexia, Vino G. Bastian, Donna Harun, Izur Muchtar	Drama	Based on autobiography Indi
Sang Pialang	Asad Amar	Kamidia Radisti, Christian Sugiono, Abimana Aryasatya	Drama	
Dream Obama	Damien Dematra	Natasha Dematra, Ayu Azhari, Pong Hardjatmo	Drama	
Tiga Sekawan: Iiih... Hantu...???	Ivan Alvameiz	Rizky Black, Stefhani Zamora Husen, Dandy Rainaldy	Adventure	
3Sum	Andri Cung, William Chandra, Witra Asliga	Winky Wirawan, Aline Adita	Action, Drama, Anthology film	
Air Terjun Pengantin Phuket	Rizal Mantovani	Tamara Blezynski, Darius Sinathrya, Kimberly Ryder	Horror, Thriller	
Nightmare Side	Intan Rizky Mutiaz	Wenda Tan, Aurelia Devi Novi, Ario Astungkoro	Horror	
True Heart	Ismail Sofyan Sani	Agung Saga, Masayu Clara, Keke Soeryo Renaldi, Ray Sahetapy, Pierre Gruno	Action, Drama	
Kata Hati	Iqbal Rais	Boy Hamzah, Joanna Alexandra, Kimberly Ryder	Drama	Based on the novel of the same name
Rectoverso	Marcella Zalianty, Happy Salma, Rachel Maryam, Olga Lidya, Cathy Sharon		Drama, Anthology film	
Di Sini Ada Yang Mati	Nayato Fio Nuala	Donita, Stuart Collin, Garneta Harun, Marie Tatiana Sivek	Horror	
Operation Wedding	Monty Tiwa	Yuki Kato, Bucek Depp, Adipati Dolken, Nino Fernandez, Kimberly Ryder	Comedy drama	
Belenggu	Upi	Abimana Aryasatya, Laudya Cynthia Bella, Imelda Therinne, Verdi Solaiman, Arswendi Nasution	Thriller	Premiered on Puchon International Fantastic Film Festival 2012
Misteri Cipularang	Dede Ferdinand	Amel Alvie, Beiby Margaretha, Fajar Rezky	Horror	
Berlian Si Etty	Dimas Adi Pratama	Fitri Tropica, Yogi Finanda, Echie Dwi Asih, Denny Soemargo, Shalvynne Chang, Donna Harun	Comedy drama	
Jeritan Danau Terlarang (Situ Gintung)	Wishnu Kuncoro	Cinta Penelope, Natalie Sarah, Opie Kumis, Mpok Nori	Horror	
Petualangan Singa Pemberani 2	Salvador Simo, Lee Croudy	Giring Ganesha, Putri Titian, Iqbal Dhiafakri, Bastian Bintang Simbolon, Alvaro Maldini Siregar, Teuku Rizky Muhammad	Adventure, Animation film	Presented in 3D
Sule Detektif Tokek	Reka Wijaya	Sule, Mpok Nori, Poppy Sovia, Uli Auliani, Pierre Gruno, Rizky Febryan Adriansyah	Comedy	
Hasduk Berpola	Harris Nizam	Bangkit Prasetyo, Idris Sardi, Iga Mawarni, Fay Nabila	Drama	
KM 97	Jose Poernomo	Febby Febiola, Restu Sinaga, August Melasz, Zidane	Horror	
Madre	Benni Setiawan	Vino G Bastian, Laura Basuki, Didi Petet	Drama	
Tampan Tailor	Guntur Soeharjanto	Vino G Bastian, Jefan Nathanio, Marsha Timothy	Drama	
Pokun Roxy	Boy Rano	Nikita Mirzani, Augie Fantinus, Bobby Maulana, Jenny Cortez	Comedy horror	
Finding Srimulat	Charles Gozali	Reza Rahadian, Rianti Cartwright, Fauzi Baadilla, Nadila Ernesta, Tessy, Kadir, Mamiek Prakoso, Djudjuk Djuariah, Gogon	Comedy	
Hari Ini Pasti Menang	Andibachtiar Yusuf	Zendhy Zain, Mathias Muchus, Ray Sahetapy, Tika Putri, Ibnu Jamil	Drama	
Mursala	Viva Westi	Rio Dewanto, Anna Sinaga, Titi Sjuman	Drama	
9 Summers 10 Autumns	Ifa Isfansyah	Ihsan Tarore, Dewi Irawan, Alex Komang, Shafil Hamdi Nawara	Drama	Based on the autobiographical novel of the same name
Kisah 3 Titik	Bobby Prabowo	Lola Amaria, Ririn Ekawati, Maryam Supraba, Donny Alamsyah	Drama	
The Legend of Trio Macan	Billy Christian	Lia Ladysta, Iva Novanda, Dian Aditya, Sam Brodie, Rully Fiss, Neni Angraini	Action comedy	
What They Don't Talk About When They Talk About Love	Mouly Surya	Nicholas Saputra, Ayushita, Anggun Priambodo, Karina Salim, Lupita Jennifer	Drama	Premiered in Sundance Film Festival 2013
Cinta Brontosaurus	Fajar Nugros	Raditya Dika, Eriska Rein, Soleh Solihun	Comedy drama	Based on the book of the same name
Laura & Marsha	Dinna Jasanti	Prisia Nasution, Adinia Wirasati	Drama	
Sang Kiai	Rako Prijanto	Ikranagara, Adipati Dolken, Agus Kuncoro Adi, Dayat Simbaia, Christine Hakim, Boy Permana		
Samudra Hotel	Jose Poernomo	Shandy Aulia, Denny Soemargo, Gilang Dirga	Horror	
Cinta Dalam Kardus	Salman Aristo	Raditya Dika, Anizabella Lesmana, Dahlia Poland, Fauzan Nasrul, Wichita Setiawati	Comedy drama	Based on mockumentary TV series Malam Minggu Miko
Cinta dari Wamena	Lasja F. Susatyo	Maximus Itlay, Benyamin Lagowan, Madonna Marrey, Nicholas Saputra, Amyra Jessica, Susan Bachtiar	Drama	
Jokowi	Azhar Kinoi Lubis	Teuku Rifnu Wikana, Prisia Nasution, Ratna Riantiarno, Ayu Diah Pasha, Susilo Badar, Landung Simatupang	Drama	Based on the life of Jokowi
Leher Angsa	Ari Sihasale	Lukman Sardi, Alexandra Gottardo, Tike Priatnakusumah, Bintang Panglima	Drama	
Refrain	Fajar Nugros	Maudy Ayunda, Afgansyah Reza, Maxime Bouttier, Chelsea Islan	Drama, Teen movie	Based on Winna Effendi's novel "Refrain"
Satu Hati Sejuta Cinta	Alyandra	Kris Hatta, Meitha Thamrin, Iris Emiliana, Tarsan, Ferry Salim	Drama	Based on Armada's song Hargai Aku
I'm Star	Damien Dematra	Natasha Dematra, Anna Tarigan, Arianda W, Made D, Andhityas Cintya	Drama	
Petualangan Lollypop	Dede Ferdinand	Diego Robbana, Fendi Perdana, Rony Dozer	Comedy drama, Children's film	
Tak Sempurna	Herman Kumala Panca	Iwa K, Sania, Derry Neo, G-Voiz, Dallas Pratama, Tya Arifin, Norman Akyuwen	Action, Comedy drama	
Bismillah Aku Mencintaimu	Asep Kusdinar	Gilbert Marciano, Ghea D'Syawal, Sam Moses, Aditya Darmawan	Drama	
Get M4rried	Monty Tiwa	Nirina Zubir, Nino Fernandez, Tatjana Saphira, Aming, Ringgo Agus Rahman, Deddy Mahendra Desta, Ira Wibowo, Jaja Mihardja, Meriam Bellina, Ricky Harun	Comedy drama	
La Tahzan	Danial Rifki	Atiqah Hasiholan, Ario Bayu, Joe Taslim	Drama	Based on Pelajar Setengah TKI
Moga Bunda Disayang Allah	Jose Poernomo	Fedi Nuril, Shandy Aulia, Chantika Zahra, Alya Rohali, Donny Damara, Iang Darmawan	Drama	Based on the novel of the same name
Kawin Kontrak 3	Awi Suryadi	Gary Iskak, Ferry Ardiansyah, Shinta Bachir, Nadia Vella, Anne J. Cotto, Ferdy Taher	Drama	
Tenggelamnya Kapal van der Wijck	Sunil Soraya	Pevita Pearce, Herjunot Ali, Reza Rahadian, Randy Nidji, Gesya Shandy, Arzeti Bilbina, Kevin Andrean, Jajang C. Noer	Romantic Drama	Based on Hamka's novel of the same name
2014
Tabula Rasa	Adriyanto Dewo	Jimmy Kobogau, Dewi Irawan, Ozol Ramdan, Yayu Unru	Drama	
Pocong Pasti Berlalu	Koya Pagayo	Tatiana Sivek, Bella Shofie, Reymond Knuliqh, Munajat Raditya, Dion Chow, Bolot, Tata Liem, Mpok Atiek, Dede Sunandar	Horror	
The Raid 2	Gareth Evans	Iko Uwais, Arifin Putra, Oka Antara, Tio Pakusadewo, Alex Abbad, Julie Estelle, Ryuhei Matsuda, Kenichi Endō, Kazuki Kitamura	Action martial arts crime film	
2015
Rock N Love	Hedy Suryawan	Tantri Syalindri Ichlasari, Swasti Sabdastantri, Mario Marcella, Denny Sumargo, Vino Bastian	Drama	
Cerita Cinta	Dienan Silmy	Teuku Rassya, Non Dhera, Joshua Suherman, Karina Christy, Olla Rosa, Angel Pieters, Agus Kuncoro	Drama	
Filosofi Kopi	Angga Dwimas Sasongko	Chicco Jerikho, Rio Dewanto, Julie Estelle, Jajang C. Noer, Slamet Rahardjo	Drama	Based on a short story of the same name
3 Dara	Ardy Octaviand	Tora Sudiro, Adipati Dolken, Tanta Ginting, Melayu Nicole Hall	Drama	
Bidadari Terakhir	Awi Suryadi	Maxime Bouttier, Whulandary Herman, Stella Cornelia	Drama	
Negeri Van Oranje	Endri Pelita	Tatjana Saphira, Chicco Jerikho, Abimana Aryasatya, Arifin Putra, Ge Pamungkas	Drama	
Ayat-ayat Adinda	Hestu Saputra	Tissa Biani Azzahra, Surya Saputra, Cynthia Lamusu, Deddy Sutomo	Drama	
Guru Bangsa: Tjokroaminoto	Garin Nugroho	Reza Rahadian, Christine Hakim, Didi Petet, Alex Komang, Sujiwo Tedjo, Maia Estianty, Ibnu Jamil, Chelsea Islan, Alex Abbad, Putri Ayudya	Drama	
Surga yang Tak Dirindukan	Kuntz Agus	Fedi Nuril, Laudya Cynthia Bella, Raline Shah, Sandrinna Michelle, Kemal Palevi, Tanta Ginting, Zaskia Adya Mecca	Drama	
The Fox Exploits The Tiger's Might	Lucky Kuswandi	Atreyu Artax Moniaga, Kemas Fauzan	Short	
Kakak	Ivander Tedjasukmana	Laudya Cynthia Bella, Surya Saputra, Gading Marten	Horror	
2016
Ada Apa dengan Cinta? 2	Riri Riza	Dian Sastrowardoyo, Nicholas Saputra, Titi Kamal, Sissy Priscillia, Adinia Wirasti, Dennis Adhiswara, Ario Bayu, Christian Sugiono	Drama	
Rudy Habibie	Hanung Bramantyo	Reza Rahadian, Chelsea Islan, Dian Nitami, Ernest Prakasa, Pandji Pragiwaksono, Bastian Bintang Simbolon	Drama	
3 Srikandi	Iman Brotoseno	Reza Rahadian, Bunga Citra Lestari, Chelsea Islan, Tara Basro, Donny Damara, Mario Irwinsyah, Indra Birowo	Biopic	
Warkop DKI Reborn: Jangkrik Boss! Part 1	Anggi Umbara	Abimana Aryasatya, Vino Bastian, Tora Sudiro	Comedy	
Mimpi Anak Pulau	Kiki Nuriswan	Ray Sahetapy, Ananda Faturrahman, Daffa Permana, Herdin Hidayat	Drama	Based on the novel of the same name by Abidah El Khalieqy
Kalam Kalam Langit	Tarmizi Abka	Elyzia Mulachela, Dimas Seto, Mathias Muchus, Ibnu Jamil, Henidar Amroe	Drama	
Aku Ingin Ibu Pulang	Monty Tiwa	Nirina Zubir, Teuku Rifnu Wikana, Jefan Nathanio, Andy F. Noya	Drama	
My Stupid Boss	Upi Avianto	Bunga Citra Lestari, Reza Rahadian, Alex Abbad, Chew Kinwah, Bront Palarae, Atikah Suhaime, Iskandar Zulkarnain, Melissa Karim	Comedy	
Sabtu Bersama Bapak	Monty Tiwa	Abimana Aryasatya, Ira Wibowo, Deva Mahenra, Arifin Putra, Acha Septriasa, Sheila Dara Aisha, Ernest Prakasa, Jennifer Arnelita	Drama	
Cek Toko Sebelah	Ernest Prakasa	Ernest Prakasa, Dion Wiyoko, Chew Kinwah, Gisella Anastasia, Adinia Wirasti, Tora Sudiro	Comedy	
2017
Promise	Asep Kusdinar	Dimas Anggara, Amanda Rawles, Boy William, Mikha Tambayong, Mawar de Jongh	Romantic comedy-drama	
Berangkat!	Naya Anindita	Tarra Budiman, Ayushita, Ringgo Agus Rahman, Tanta Ginting, Reza Nangin, Martin Anugrah, Saykoji, Annisa Pagih and Babe Cabita	Adventure comedy-drama	
Kartini	Hanung Bramantyo	Dian Sastrowardoyo, Deddy Sutomo, Christine Hakim, Acha Septriasa, Ayushita, Reza Rahadian, Adinia Wirasti	Drama	
Marlina the Murderer in Four Acts	Mouly Surya	Marsha Timothy	Drama	
The Underdogs	Adink Liwutang	Sheryl Sheinafia, Brandon Salim, Jeff Smith and Babe Cabita	YouTuber-themed musical comedy-drama	Indonesian: Kaum Underdog
Satan's Slaves	Joko Anwar	Tara Basro, Bront Palarae	Horror	Indonesian: Pengabdi Setan
Sweet 20	Ody C. Harahap	Tatjana Saphira, Kevin Julio, Morgan Oey	Musical romantic comedy	
Surga Yang Tak Dirindukan 2	Hanung Bramantyo	Fedi Nuril, Raline Shah, Laudya Cynthia Bella, Reza Rahadian, Nora Danish	Drama	
2018
Alas Pati: Hutan Mati	Jose Poernomo	Nikita Willy, Jeff Smith, Stefhanie Zamora, Roy Sungkono, Naomi Paulinda, and Maura Inry Gabrielle	Horror	
Dajjal: The Slayer and His Followers	Rana Abrar	Animated Characters	Action, Thriller	
Dancing in the Rain	Rudi Aryanto	Dimas Anggara, Bunga Zainal, Deva Mahenra, Christine Hakim	Coming-of-age drama	
Dilan 1990	Fajar Bustomi, Pidi Baiq	Iqbaal Ramadhan, Vanesha Prescilla	Drama, Romance	
Kuntilanak	Rizal Mantovani	Sandrinna Michelle, Aurélie Moeremans, Fero Walandouw	Horror	
Memories of My Body	Garin Nugroho	Muhammad Khan	Drama	Indonesian title: Kucumbu Tubuh Indahku
Friend but Married	Rako Prijanto	Adipati Dolken, Vanesha Prescilla	Drama	
Sakral	Tema Patrosza	Olla Ramlan, Teuku Zacky, Makayla Rose, Erika Carlina, Raquel Katie Larkin, Ninok Wiryono, and Billy Boedjanger	Horror	
The Night Comes for Us	Timo Tjahjanto	Iko Uwais, Joe Taslim, Julie Estelle, Sunny Pang, Zack Lee	Action thriller	
Perang Sosoh Pedekik 1949	Musrial Mustafa	Iskandar Zulkarnain, Alfa Yopie, Khairul Adha, Fathur Rasyid, Asnawi, Busro, and Yanto		
2019
Ave Maryam	Ertanto Robby Soediskam	Maudy Koesnaedi, Chicco Jerikho, Tutie Kirana, Olga Lydia, Joko Anwar, Nathania Angela	Drama	
Cinta Itu Buta	Rachmania Arunita	Shandy Aulia, Dodit Mulyanto	Comedy, Romance	
Dilan 1991	Fajar Bustomi, Pidi Baiq	Iqbaal Ramadhan, Vanesha Prescilla	Drama, Romance	
DoReMi and You	HW Purbanegara	Adyla Rafa Naura Ayu, Fatih Unru, Nashwa Zahira, Devano Danendra	Musical, Teen	
Gundala	Joko Anwar	Abimana Aryasatya, Tara Basro, Bront Palarae, Ario Bayu, Rio Dewanto	Superhero	
Hit & Run	Ody C. Harahap	Joe Taslim, Chandra Liow, Tatjana Saphira, Jefri Nichol, Nadya Arina, Yayan Ruhian, Reza Aditya, Qausar Harta Yudana, Peter Taslim, Simone Julia, David Hendrawan, Novi Rahmat Hidayat, Karina Suwandhi, Mathias Muchus, Caitlin North Lewis, Tika Panggabean, Aufa Assagaf, Dayu Wijanto, Mardiyono "Mardi" Sulaiman and Tanta Ginting	Action comedy	
Impetigore	Joko Anwar	Tara Basro, Marissa Anita, Christine Hakim, Asmara Abigail, and Ario Bayu	Horror	Indonesian: Perempuan Tanah Jahanam
Perjanjian dengan Iblis	Ardy Octaviand	Shandy Aulia, Artika Sari Devi, Aghi Narottama, Basmalah Gralind, and Alex Abbad	Horror	
Sexy Killers	Dandhy Dwi Laksono, Ucok Suparta		Documentary	
Susy Susanti – Love All	Sim F.	Laura Basuki, Dion Wiyoko, Farhan	Biographical sports drama	
Tembang Lingsir	Rizal Mantovani	Marsha Aruan, Aisyah Aqilah, Jennifer Coppen, Teuku Rifnu Wikana, Meisya Siregar, Sarah Tüffahati Mornov, and Arya Vasco	Horror, Thriller	
The 3rd Eye 2	Rocky Soraya	Jessica Mila, Nabilah Ratna Ayu Azalia, Sophia Latjuba	Horror	Indonesian: Mata Batin 2
Title	Director	Cast	Genre	Notes

== 2020s ==
Title	Director	Cast	Genre	Notes
2020
Anak Ambar	Melvin Giovanie	Irene Sonia, Melvin Giovanie, Wellyranti, Nissy Ariana Meinard, Qory Sandyoriva, Levana Azzahra, Ilah Milah	Horror	
Bidadari Mencari Sayap	Aria Kusumadewa	Leony, Rizky Hanggono	Melodrama	
Crazy Awesome Teachers	Sammaria Simanjuntak	Gading Marten, Boris Bokir, Kevin Ardilova, Dian Sastrowardoyo		
Love Like the Falling Rain	Lasja F. Susatyo		Drama	
May the Devil Take You Too	Timo Tjahjanto	Chelsea Islan, Widika Sidmore, Hadijah Shahab, Baskara Mahendra, Shareefa Daanish	Horror	
Milea: Suara dari Dilan	Fajar Bustomi, Pidi Baiq	Iqbaal Ramadhan, Vanesha Prescilla, Adhisty Zara	Drama	
One Day We'll Talk About Today	Angga Dwimas Sasongko	Rachel Amanda, Rio Dewanto, Sheila Dara Aisha, Ardhito Pramono, Donny Damara, Susan Bachtiar, Oka Antara, Niken Anjani, Agla Artalidia	Drama	
Rasuk 2	Rizal Mantovani	Nikita Willy, Achmad Megantara, Asri Welas	Horror	
Surat dari Kematian			Horror	
Tenripada	Syahrir Arsyad Dini	Reza Pahlevi, Jeihan Dun, Saffanah Kayla	Drama	
Whipped	Chandra Liow	Andovi Da Lopez, Jovial Da Lopez, Tommy Limm, Chandra Liow	Comedy	
2021
Affliction	Teddy Soeriaatmadja	Raihaanun, Tutie Kirana, Ibnu Jamil	Horror	
Ali & Ratu Ratu Queens	Lucky Kuswandi	Iqbaal Ramadhan, Marissa Anita, Aurora Ribero, Nirina Zubir, Tika Panggabean, Asri Welas, Happy Salma	Comedy drama	
Aum!	Bambang "Ipoenk" Kuntara Mukti	Jefri Nichol, Chicco Jerikho, Aksara Dena, Agnes Natasya Tjie	Adventure, mockumentary	
Autobiography	Makbul Mubarak	Kevin Ardilova, Arswendy Bening Swara	Political thriller	
Geez & Ann	Rizki Balki	Junior Roberts, Hanggini	Romantic drama	
The Heartbreak Club	Charles Gozali	Bhisma Mulia, Denira Wiraguna, Rezca Syam, Dede Satria	Musical romantic comedy	
Incredible Love			Romantic drama	
June & Kopi	Noviandra Santosa	Acha Septriasa, Ryan Delon, Makayla Rose Hilli	Comedy drama, family	
Layla Majnun	Monty Tiwa	Acha Septriasa, Reza Rahadian, Baim Wong	Romantic drama	
Paranoia	Riri Riza	Nirina Zubir, Lukman Sardi, Caitlin North Lewis, Nicholas Saputra	Drama thriller	
A Perfect Fit	Hadrah Daeng Ratu	Nadya Arina, Refal Hady, Giorgino Abraham	Romantic drama	
Photocopier	Wregas Bhanuteja	Shenina Cinnamon, Chicco Kurniawan, Lutesha, Jerome Kurnia, Dea Panendra, Giulio Parengkuan	Crime drama	
Preman	Randolph Zaini	Khiva Iskak, Muzzaki Ramdhan	Action	
Vengeance Is Mine, All Others Pay Cash	Edwin	Marthino Lio, Ladya Cheryl, Sal Priadi, Reza Rahadian, Ratu Felisha	Black comedy action	
A World Without	Nia Dinata	Amanda Rawles, Maizura, Asmara Abigail	Science fiction	
Yang Tak Tergantikan			Family	
Yuni	Kamila Andini	Arawinda Kirana	Drama	
2022
Before, Now & Then	Kamila Andini	Happy Salma, Laura Basuki, Rieke Diah Pitaloka	Period drama	Indonesian: Nana
The Big 4	Timo Tjahjanto	Abimana Aryasatya, Putri Marino, Lutesha, Arie Kriting, Kristo Immanuel	Action comedy	
KKN di Desa Penari	Awi Suryadi	Tissa Biani, Adinda Thomas, Achmad Megantara	Horror	Most watched film in Indonesia with 9,233,847 viewer
Missing Home	Bene Dion Rajagukguk	Arswendy Beningswara Nasution, Tika Panggabean, Boris Bokir Manullang, Gita Bhebita Butarbutar, Lolox, Indra Jegel	Comedy drama	
Satan's Slaves 2: Communion	Joko Anwar	Tara Basro, Endy Arfian, Nasar Anuz, Bront Palarae	Horror	
Stealing Raden Saleh	Angga Dwimas Sasongko	Iqbaal Ramadhan, Angga Yunanda, Aghniny Haque, Rachel Amanda, Umay Shahab, Ari Irham	Heist action	

== See also ==
- Cinema of Indonesia
