= Ratu Ratu Queens: The Series =

Indonesian comedy television series

- Genre: Comedy drama
- Created by: Lucky Kuswandi
- Based on: Characters from Ali & Ratu Ratu Queens by Gina S. Noer and Muhammad Zaidy
- Showrunner: Muhammad Zaidy
- Written by: Andri Cung
- Directed by: Lucky Kuswandi
- Starring: Nirina Zubir; Happy Salma; Tika Panggabean; Asri Welas
- Composers: Yudhi Arfani; Zeke Khaseli; Ricky Surya Virgana (additional)
- Country of origin: Indonesia
- Original languages: Indonesian; English
- No. of seasons: 1
- No. of episodes: 6

Production
- Producers: Muhammad Zaidy; Meiske Taurisia
- Production locations: New York City, U.S.
- Cinematography: Gunnar Nimpuno
- Editor: Ahmad Yuniardi
- Running time: 37–51 minutes
- Production company: Palari Films

Original release
- Network: Netflix
- Release: 12 September 2025

Ratu Ratu Queens: The Series (English: Queens of Queens: The Series) is an Indonesian comedy drama television series and a prequel to the 2021 film Ali & Ratu Ratu Queens. The series is based on characters created by Gina S. Noer and Muhammad Zaidy. Nirina Zubir, Happy Salma, Tika Panggabean, and Asri Welas reprised their roles from the film as Party, Chinta, Ance, and Biyah, respectively.

It premiered on Netflix on 12 September 2025.

== Premise ==
Ratu Ratu Queens: The Series serves as the prequel to the 2021 film Ali & Ratu Ratu Queens. It follows the lives of four Indonesian immigrants as they form a friendship and navigate life in New York City.

== Cast and characters ==
=== Main cast ===
- Nirina Zubir as Party, a waitress and the breadwinner of her family, who is seeking roommates to share her apartment in Queens.
- Happy Salma as Chinta, a socialite married to a foreigner. Party works part time as a cleaner in her house.
- Tika Panggabean as Ance, a helicopter single mother raising her teenage daughter, Eva.
- Asri Welas as Biyah, a costumed street busker on the run from a loan shark.
- Luna Allegra Kurtz as Eva, Ance's teenage daughter who is still struggling to process the grief of her father's death. Aurora Ribero plays the older version of Eva in the 2021 film.

=== Recurring cast ===
- Michael Notardonato as Luca, a chef and Party's love interest.
- Yoshi Sudarso as Bisma, a fellow member of the Indonesian diaspora and Party's neighbor, who owns an Indonesian restaurant.
- Aimee Saras as Ambar, a waitress who is Party's rival and has a crush on Luca.
- Shanty as Tuti Emut, Biyah's former friend who betrays her and later becomes a popular dangdut singer.
- Bi Jean Ngo as Ahma, Party's landlord who owns a convenience store.
- Kevin Tan as Black Dragon, a mafia boss to whom Biyah owes money.
- Edward Lewis French as Ricky, Chinta's husband.
- Rita Matu Mona as Party's mother who falls ill.
- Yusuf Mahardika as Juki, Party's younger brother.

== Episodes ==
No.	Title	Directed by	Written by	Original release date
1	"Queens of Queens"	Lucky Kuswandi	Andri Cung	12 September 2025
2	"A New Life Together"	Lucky Kuswandi	Andri Cung	12 September 2025
3	"Nothing Will Twerk Us Down"	Lucky Kuswandi	Andri Cung	12 September 2025
4	"Never Been Kissed"	Lucky Kuswandi	Andri Cung	12 September 2025
5	"The Betrayal"	Lucky Kuswandi	Andri Cung	12 September 2025
6	"Finding Home"	Lucky Kuswandi	Andri Cung	12 September 2025

== Production ==
Producer Muhammad Zaidy revealed that the idea of a series focusing on the lives of the four characters was conceived in 2015, prior to the 2021 film. In August 2024, it was reported that the prequel series of the 2021 film Ali & Ratu Ratu Queens had been in production, with Lucky Kuswandi returned to direct. It was then announced as part of Netflix's Southeast Asian slate in February 2025.

Principal photography took place in New York City and Jakarta for fifty-one days. It had wrapped in September 2024.

== Release ==
Ratu Ratu Queens: The Series premiered on Netflix on 12 September 2025.

== Accolades ==
Award / Film Festival	Date of ceremony	Category	Recipient(s)	Result	Ref.
Festival Film Bandung	22 August 2026	Highly Commended Web Series	Ratu Ratu Queens: The Series	Nominated	
Festival Film Bandung	22 August 2026	Highly Commended Director for a Web Series	Lucky Kuswandi	Won	
Festival Film Bandung	22 August 2026	Highly Commended Leading Actress in a Web Series	Nirina Zubir	Nominated	
Festival Film Bandung	22 August 2026	Highly Commended Supporting Actress in a Web Series	Asri Welas	Nominated	
