= Milea (film) =

2020 film by Pidi Baiq and Fajar Bustomi

- Theatrical release poster
- Directed by: Fajar Bustomi; Pidi Baiq
- Written by: Titien Wattimena; Pidi Baiq
- Based on: Milea: Suara dari Dilan by Pidi Baiq
- Produced by: Ody Mulya Hidayat
- Starring: Iqbaal of Coboy Junior; Vanesha Prescilla
- Cinematography: Dimas Imam Subhono
- Edited by: Ryan Purwoko
- Music by: Andhika Triyadi
- Production company: Max Pictures
- Release date: 13 February 2020
- Running time: 103 minutes
- Country: Indonesia
- Language: Indonesian
- Budget: Rp 65.11 billion
- Box office: Rp 122 billion

Milea (subtitled Suara dari Dilan in Indonesia; lit. ''Milea: The Voices of Dilan'') is a 2020 Indonesian language romantic drama film directed by Fajar Bustomi and Pidi Baiq, and written by Baiq and Titien Wattimena. The film is based on the novel of the same name by Baiq and is the sequel to Dilan 1991 released in 2019. The film is a spin-off, having its point of view from Dilan and displaying events uncaptured in the previous two films. The film was distributed to Netflix on 13 June 2020, and premiered on SCTV on 25 August 2020.

== Plot ==
In the 1970s Bandung, Dilan was born to head teacher Punja Kusuma and soldier Ichal. As a child, he wished to marry someone. The Kusumas are victims of domestic abuse, propelling Dilan's participation in a student motorbike gang. He falls in love with Milea, leaving his girlfriend Susi. Days after becoming Milea's boyfriend, Dilan is beaten up by a gang at a warung. He plots revenge and fails to take Milea's confrontation seriously when he sees her with a man, who he later learns is her cousin, Yugo. The attack was then foiled by the police. One day, Milea and Dilan break up, as Milea is tired of him staying with his gang even after one of his close friends, Akew, is killed, presumably by them, though this is later proven wrong.

Dilan hears that Milea is in a relationship with a guy named Gunar; envious, he tells Piyan to fake that he already has a new girlfriend. He reflects on what he once said, "If anyone hurt you, they must be gone", concluding, "If I hurt her, I must be gone too", and moves to Yogyakarta for college. After graduating in August 1994, his father died of cancer. He briefly sees Milea at the funeral, then moves to Jakarta.

In September 1997, Dilan encountered Milea and her husband, Herdi, at their workplace. That same day, their former teacher, Ms. Rini, died, prompting the school to organize a reunion. Subsequently, Dilan and Milea discussed their high school memories over the phone, during which Milea confirmed that she had never been involved with Gunar. Afterwards, Dilan drove along the road they had once shared, reflecting on his regret for not having married her.

== Cast ==
- Iqbaal of Coboy Junior as Dilan
  - Bima Azriel as Young Dilan
- Vanesha Prescilla as Milea
- Ira Wibowo as Dilan's mother
- Bucek Depp as Dilan's father
- Happy Salma as Milea's mother
- Farhan as Milea's father
- Adhisty Zara as Disa
- Yoriko Angeline as Wati
- Debo Andryos as Nandan
- Zulfa Maharani as Rani
- Gusti Rayhan as Akew
- Omara Esteghlal as Piyan
- Giulio Parengkuan as Anhar
- Andovi da Lopez as Herdi
- Jerome Kurnia as Yugo
- Tike Priatnakusumah as Aunt Eem

== Release ==
Milea premiered theatrically on 13 February 2020, in correspondence with Kajeng Kliwon.

=== Marketing ===
The poster and trailer were unveiled on 9 December 2019. Two days later, the film's trailer reportedly became the most-viewed video in the Indonesian YouTube data. Marketing was also done on Jakarta's trains, which was then cancelled by Iqbaal due to the guilt of making passengers uncomfortable.

== Reception ==
Reflecting on the reception of the two previous films, producer Ody Mulya Hidayat hypothesized that the film would be the first Indonesian film to reach 7 million views theatrically, meaning it would be screened in 1,000 to 1,500 theaters in its opening.

=== Box office ===
Milea receives more than 400,000 views on its opening day, making it the second most-viewed film in Indonesian film history. Milea beat Warkop DKI Reborn: Jangkrik Boss! Part 2 (313,623 viewers), in which it is now in third place. The fourth place is owned by Warkop DKI Reborn: Jangkrik Boss! Part 1 (270,000 views). Other than that, Danur 3: Sunyaruri is the fifth with 251,157 views. In three days, the film received 1.2 million views. The numbers attracted the eyes of the Minister of Tourism and Creative Economy, Wishnutama. Via his Instagram account, Wishnutama congratulated the achievement Milea achieved. The number of viewers Milea received by its fourth day is around 1,627,750, making it the second trendiest Indonesian film. It beat Akhir Kisah Cinta Si Doel, in which the film has more than 1.15 million views. Milea is now in the same rank with Nanti Kita Cerita tentang Hari Ini in terms of box office. Via the film's official Twitter account, the numbers in its 'opening weekend' were the second highest. Milea now grossed 65.11 billion rupiah. In just a week, Milea received more than 2 million views, and is 2020's second trendiest film in terms of views. Milea is predicted to beat Nanti Kita Cerita tentang Hari Ini by Angga Dwimas Sasongko. The film is among the 15 films played since early January to late February. Viewers of Milea is still slightly lower than Danur 3: Sunyaruri (2,411,036) dan Dua Garis Biru (2,538,473), as well asImperfect: Karier, Cinta &amp; Timbangan (2,662,356). In its tenth day of screening, more than 2.7 million people viewed it, and achieved more than 3 million views in its 18th day. Milea 's achievements has been predicted by the film crew before. The revenue made from the viewers of Milea will increase but its exact number will be unknown, especially with it succeeding Dilan 1990 (6.3 million) and Dilan 1991 (5.25 million).

== Accolades ==
Award	Date of ceremony	Category	Recipient(s)	Result	Ref.
Indonesian Movie Actors Awards	28 November 2021	Favorite Film	Milea: Suara dari Dilan	Nominated	
Indonesian Music Awards	26 November 2020	Best Original Soundtrack Production Work	The Panasdalam Bank & Vanesha Prescilla (Bunyi Sunyi)	Nominated	
SCTV Awards	29 November 2020	Most Popular Film	Milea: Suara dari Dilan	Won	

== Sequel ==
The sequel, called Ancika 1995, has been produced by Enam Sembilan Productions since 3 April 2023. The film was based on Pidi Baiq's 2021 novel, Ancika: Dia Yang Bersamaku Tahun 1995. Big changes occurred in the cast. Dilan, who was previously played by Iqbaal Ramadhan, was replaced by Arbani Yasiz. Meanwhile, Ancika, Dilan's new girlfriend, was played by Zee JKT48. Ancika: Dia yang Bersamaku 1995 premiered theatrically on January 11, 2024.
