= Dilan 1991 =

2019 Indonesian romantic drama film

- Theatrical release poster
- Directed by: Fajar Bustomi; Pidi Baiq
- Written by: Pidi Baiq; Titien Wattimena
- Based on: Dilan Bagian Kedua: Dia adalah Dilanku tahun 1991 by Pidi Baiq
- Starring: Iqbaal of Coboy Junior; Vanesha Prescilla
- Cinematography: Dimas Imam Subhono
- Edited by: Ryan Purwoko
- Music by: Andhika Triyadi
- Production company: Max Pictures
- Release dates: 24 February 2019 (Bandung, Special Screening); 28 February 2019 (Indonesia); 11 July 2019 (Malaysia)
- Country: Indonesia
- Language: Indonesian
- Box office: Rp 200 billion $14,122,199

Dilan 1991 is a 2019 Indonesian language romantic drama film. Like its prequel, the film is also based on the Dilan novel series written by Pidi Baiq, this is from Dilan Bagian Kedua: Dia adalah Dilanku tahun 1991 (Dilan Part Two: He is My Dilan in 1991). The film sold more than 5 million tickets as of 17 March, 2019.

== Plot ==
Milea, now in a relationship with Dilan, faces problems. He is involved in an aggressive motorbike gang at his school, engaging in fights every other day. This eventually leads him to get expelled from the school. She still tries to understand him and does not let the relationship be affected. Meanwhile, her cousin Yugo returns from Belgium and starts acting incestuous towards Milea, making her uncomfortable.

One night, she sees Dilan planning an attack, threatening a breakup if he does not mend his ways. Seeing Yugo as a foreign man in the car, Dilan ignores Milea and is arrested for using his father's pistol. One day, Milea's parents advise her to take Yugo around Bandung. In a cinema, Yugo tries to kiss Milea; she asks Yugo not to see her again. In an apology meeting, Milea brings Dilan to scare off Yugo.

Milea learns that Dilan is involved in another attack; this time, he is kicked out by his mom and shelters at the gang leader's house. Milea slaps him, tired of his involvement in problems, and declares a breakup. Dilan's mother then confronts him at a stadium. He walks away, leaving Milea crying on his mother's shoulders. Milea later graduates from college, and her family moves out of their home.

In 1995 in Jakarta, Milea, now married to her college friend Herdi, sees Dilan at an office building that the three of them happen to work at. Dilan tells her that he is leaving for Surabaya that night. After some time, Milea tries to catch the train he is leaving from, but fails. In 2018, in her apartment, she writes the last few sentences of her memoir, a direct copy of Pidi Baiq's novel, which the film is based on.

== Cast ==
- Iqbaal of Coboy Junior as Dilan
- Vanesha Prescilla as young Milea Adnan Hussain
- Sissy Priscillia as adult Milea Adnan Hussain (voice only, narrator)
- Jerome Kurnia as Yugo, Milea's distant relative
- Omara Esteghlal as Piyan
- Zulfa Maharani as Rani
- Yoriko Angeline as Wati
- Andryos Aryanto as Nandan
- Adhisty Zara (Zara JKT48) as Disa, Dilan's younger sister
- Moira Tabina Zayn as Airin, Milea's sister
- Ira Wibowo as Dilan's mother
- Bucek Depp as Lt. Faisal, Dilan's father
- Farhan as Milea's father
- Happy Salma as Milea's mother
- Andovi da Lopez as Mas Herdi, adult Milea's boyfriend
- Maudy Koesnaedi as Tante Anis, Yugo's mother
- TJ as Anhar's mother
- Teuku Rifnu Wikana as Pak Suripto
- Refal Hady as Kang Adi
- Gusti Rayhan as Hendri Wijaya (Akew)
- Tike Priatnakusumah as Bi' E'em
- Ridwan Kamil as Headmaster
- Teddy Snada as Vice Headmaster
- Brandon Salim as Benni
- Iang Darmawan as Pak Rahmat
- Aris Nugraha as Pak Atam
- Inten Leony as Ibu Sri
- Ira Ratih as Ibu Rini
- Polo Reza as Burhan
- Azzura Pinkania Imanda as Revi

== Accolades ==
Award	Date of ceremony	Category	Recipient(s)	Result	Ref.
Indonesian Movie Actors Awards	25 July 2020	Favorite Film	Dilan 1991	Nominated	
Indonesian Music Awards	27 November 2019	Best Album	The Panasdalam Bank – Dilan 1990-1991 (Original Motion Picture Soundtrack)	Nominated	
Indonesian Music Awards	27 November 2019	Best Pop Album	The Panasdalam Bank – Dilan 1990-1991 (Original Motion Picture Soundtrack)	Nominated	
Indonesian Music Awards	27 November 2019	Best Original Soundtrack Production Work	The Panasdalam Bank & Vanesha Prescilla (Berpisah)	Won	
LINE Indonesia Awards	17 December 2019	Most Favorite Movie	Dilan 1991	Nominated	
LINE Indonesia Awards	17 December 2019	Most Favorite Actor	Iqbaal Ramadhan	Nominated	
Parfi Awards	30 December 2020	Best Actor – Drama	Iqbaal Ramadhan	Won	
SCTV Awards	29 November 2019	Most Popular Film	Dilan 1991	Won	

== See also ==
- Milea: Suara dari Dilan, its sequel
