= Ali & Ratu Ratu Queens =

2021 Indonesian film directed by Lucky Kuswandi

- Netflix release poster
- Directed by: Lucky Kuswandi
- Screenplay by: Gina S. Noer
- Story by: Gina S. Noer; Muhammad Zaidy
- Produced by: Muhammad Zaidy; Meiske Taurisia
- Starring: Iqbaal Ramadhan; Aurora Ribero; Nirina Zubir
- Cinematography: Batara Goempar
- Edited by: Aline Jusria
- Music by: Ken Jenie; Mar Galo
- Production company: Palari Films
- Distributed by: Netflix
- Release date: 17 June 2021
- Running time: 100 minutes
- Countries: Indonesia; United States
- Languages: Indonesian; English

Ali & Ratu Ratu Queens (transl. Ali & the Queens of Queens) is a 2021 Indonesian comedy-drama film directed by Lucky Kuswandi, written by Gina S. Noer and Muhammad Zaidy and starring Iqbaal Dhiafakhri Ramadhan, Marissa Anita, Aurora Ribero and Nirina Zubir. Ramadhan portrays the son from a divorced household visiting his mother (Anita) at New York City to reconcile.

== Plot ==
In Jakarta, 17-year-old Ali watches his dying father, Hasan, die of heart attack. Ali's mother Mia left them for New York City (NYC) when he was five. Initially believing that Mia had died, Ali finds letters, postcards, and flight tickets for Ali to visit Mia in New York, which Hasan hid from him. Ali reveals his desire to search for his mother in NYC, and after heated negotiations, his helicopter aunt Suci gives him two weeks. He visits an apartment in Queens where his mother stayed previously and meets her friend Party, who works as a cleaner. She shares the same apartment with Biyah, a Bondho Nekat-turned-paparazzi; Ance, a single helicopter mom; and Chinta, a masseuse. Compensated with money, they pledge to help Ali's search for Mia. They also guide Ali through NYC, and Ali helps them in their jobs so that they can earn US$10,000 to open an Indonesian restaurant, Ratu Ratu Queens (transl. Queens of Queens). Ali develops a crush on Eva, Ance's daughter born in NYC.

Through a friend, Biyah learns that Mia resides in Fort Greene, Brooklyn. Ali decides to visit her, who is shocked at his presence and slams the door. Ali also learns that Mia has a new husband, Alex, a son and daughter. The next day, Ali re-attempts to engage with her and reveals Hasan's death. Mia expresses her condolences and shares her phone number. Ali and Mia meet up in a cafe near Ali's apartment, and the two spend the day together but end awry as Ali asks his mom to include him in her new family; she says this could ruin her household, also revealing that Hasan ignorantly prohibited Ali from flying to New York with the ticket she purchased.

Ali invites Mia to a Thanksgiving dinner at her old apartment. Mia feels taunted passive-aggressively by Biyah, Ance, and Chinta on her actions when Ali shows up at her doorstep. Feeling guilty, she hands a US$20,000 check to Party, directed towards Ali, and informs Party to convince Ali to return to Indonesia. Assuming Party and her friends are only after his money, Ali expresses betrayal and leaves the apartment. Mia reveals that she indeed provided the check, reasoning that she cannot abandon her new family and wants Ali to return. She tearfully responds that the more she meets Ali, the more guilty she feels for leaving him. Ali reluctantly asks her to disown her. Mia tearfully confesses that she has been a terrible mother and tells Ali to hate her so he can leave.

Ali leaves, staying up through predawn, and meets up with Eva, who advises him to go back to the apartment. He complies, and shows Party, Biyah, Ance, and Chinta a video he edited using videos he recorded while living with them, expressing his apology and positivity. They reconcile, and Ali accepts them as his new family. In the end, Ali is accepted into a local university, and as Christmas nears, Mia confides on Ali in private to Alex. In a mid-credits scene, Ali's cousin flies to NYC to meet Ali upon Suci's demand.

== Cast ==
- Iqbaal Ramadhan as Ali
- Marissa Anita as Mia, Ali's estranged mother
- Aurora Ribero as Eva
- Nirina Zubir as Party
- Tika Panggabean as Ance
- Asri Welas as Biyah
- Happy Salma as Chinta
- Bayu Skak as Zulpang
- Ibnu Jamil as Hasan, Ali's deceased father
- Cut Mini Theo as Bude
- Arief Didu as Pakde

== Release ==
It was released on 17 June 2021 on Netflix.

== Television series ==
On 15 August 2024, Netflix announced that the prequel series, Ratu Ratu Queens: The Series had been in production. The series premiered on 12 September 2025.

== Accolades ==
Award	Date of ceremony	Category	Recipient(s)	Result	Ref.
Bandung Film Festival	23 October 2021	Best Director – Motion Picture	Lucky Kuswandi	Nominated	
Bandung Film Festival	23 October 2021	Best Supporting Actress – Motion Picture	Marissa Anita	Nominated	
Bandung Film Festival	23 October 2021	Best Editing – Motion Picture	Aline Jusria	Won	
Indonesian Film Festival	10 November 2021	Best Picture	Ali & Ratu Ratu Queens	Nominated	
Indonesian Film Festival	10 November 2021	Best Director	Lucky Kuswandi	Nominated	
Indonesian Film Festival	10 November 2021	Best Actor	Iqbaal Ramadhan	Nominated	
Indonesian Film Festival	10 November 2021	Best Supporting Actress	Marissa Anita	Won	
Indonesian Film Festival	10 November 2021	Best Supporting Actress	Asri Welas	Nominated	
Indonesian Film Festival	10 November 2021	Best Original Screenplay	Gina S. Noer	Nominated	
Indonesian Film Festival	10 November 2021	Best Cinematography	Batara Goempar	Nominated	
Indonesian Film Festival	10 November 2021	Best Editing	Aline Jusria	Nominated	
Indonesian Film Festival	10 November 2021	Best Visual Effects	Rivai Chen	Nominated	
Indonesian Film Festival	10 November 2021	Best Sound	Yusuf Patawari, Wahyu Tri Purnomo & Pat O'Leary	Nominated	
Indonesian Film Festival	10 November 2021	Best Original Score	Mar Galo & Ken Jenie	Nominated	
Indonesian Film Festival	10 November 2021	Best Theme Songwriter	Bam Mastro ("Never Look Back")	Nominated	
Indonesian Film Festival	10 November 2021	Best Theme Songwriter	Iqbaal Ramadhan & Tarapti Ikhtiar Rinrin ("On My Own")	Nominated	
Indonesian Film Festival	10 November 2021	Best Art Direction	Eros Eflin & Roxy Martinez	Nominated	
Indonesian Film Festival	10 November 2021	Best Costume Design	Karin Wijaya	Nominated	
Indonesian Film Festival	10 November 2021	Best Makeup & Hairstyling	Marshya D. Martha	Nominated	
Indonesian Film Festival	10 November 2021	Favorite Film	Ali & Ratu Ratu Queens	Won	
Indonesian Movie Actors Awards	28 November 2021	Best Actress	Marissa Anita	Nominated	
Indonesian Movie Actors Awards	28 November 2021	Best Ensemble	Ali & Ratu Ratu Queens	Nominated	
Indonesian Movie Actors Awards	28 November 2021	Favorite Film	Ali & Ratu Ratu Queens	Nominated	
Indonesian Movie Actors Awards	28 November 2021	Favorite Actress	Marissa Anita	Nominated	
Indonesian Reporters Film Festival	28 October 2021	Best Film – Drama	Ali & Ratu Ratu Queens	Won	
Indonesian Reporters Film Festival	28 October 2021	Best Director – Drama	Lucky Kuswandi	Won	
Indonesian Reporters Film Festival	28 October 2021	Best Actor – Drama	Iqbaal Ramadhan	Nominated	
Indonesian Reporters Film Festival	28 October 2021	Best Supporting Actress – Drama	Nirina Zubir	Won	
Indonesian Reporters Film Festival	28 October 2021	Best Supporting Actress – Drama	Marissa Anita	Nominated	
Indonesian Reporters Film Festival	28 October 2021	Best Screenplay – Drama	Gina S. Noer	Nominated	
Indonesian Reporters Film Festival	28 October 2021	Best Editing – Drama	Aline Jusria	Won	
Indonesian Reporters Film Festival	28 October 2021	Best Cinematography – Drama	Batara Goempar	Won	
Maya Awards	2022	Best Feature Film	Ali & Ratu Ratu Queens	Nominated	
Maya Awards	2022	Best Director	Lucky Kuswandi	Nominated	
Maya Awards	2022	Best Actor in a Leading Role	Iqbaal Ramadhan	Nominated	
Maya Awards	2022	Best Actress in a Supporting Role	Marissa Anita	Nominated	
Maya Awards	2022	Best Original Screenplay	Gina S. Noer & Muhammad Zaidy	Nominated	
Maya Awards	2022	Best Cinematography	Batara Goempar	Nominated	
Maya Awards	2022	Best Costume Design	Karin Wijaya	Nominated	
Maya Awards	2022	Best Makeup & Hairstyling	Marshya D. Martha	Nominated	
Xposure Choice	21 January 2022	The Most Xposure Actor	Iqbaal Ramadhan	Won	
