= Jerome Kurnia =

Indonesian actor (born 1994)

- Born: 4 February 1994 (age 32); Jakarta, Indonesia
- Occupations: Actor; model; radio presenter; singer
- Years active: 2017–present

Jerome Kurnia (born 4 February 1994) is an Indonesian actor and model. He rose to prominence for his acting roles in Dilan 1991 and This Earth of Mankind, both in 2019. His performance in the latter garnered him a nomination for Best Supporting Actor at the 2019 Indonesian Film Festival. At the 2021 ceremony, he won the same award for his performance in Photocopier.

== Career ==
Kurnia joined Virgin Radio Jakarta in 2017 and served as a radio presenter for eleven months. He then auditioned for Hanung Bramantyo's adaptation of This Earth of Mankind and was cast in the role of Robert Suurhof. His performance in the film earned him a nomination for Best Supporting Actor at the 2019 Indonesian Film Festival. In 2019, he starred in teen romantic drama Dilan 1991 as Yugo and in its spin–off Milea.

In 2021, Kurnia was cast in Wregas Bhanuteja's directorial debut film Photocopier. At the 2021 Indonesian Film Festival, he won the Citra Award for Best Supporting Actor for his performance in the film. Kurnia was cast in short film Dear to Me, which had its world premiere at the 74th Locarno Film Festival. In 2022, he starred in Bramantyo's superhero film Satria Dewa: Gatotkaca as Erlangga, the best friend of Yuda / Gatotkaca. He also starred as Devan in Gina S. Noer's drama film Like & Share.

In addition to his acting career, he started a band with Will Mara and Alif Ibrahim called Ricecooker as a vocalist.

== Filmography ==
Film

Year	Title	Role	Notes
2019	Dilan 1991	Yugo	
2019	This Earth of Mankind	Robert Suurhof	
2019	Sin	Kevin	
2019	Senior	Nakula / Sadewa	
2020	Letter from Death	Darius / Damian	
2020	Milea	Yugo	
2021	Aku Lupa Aku Luka	Doni	
2021	A World Without	Hafiz	
2021	Photocopier	Tariq	
2021	Dear to Me	James	Short film
2022	Satria Dewa: Gatotkaca	Erlangga	
2022	Like & Share	Devan	
2023	A Long Way to Come Home	Rikitrong "Kit" Wagner	
2023	Invalidite	Gilvy	
2024	The Architecture of Love	Aga Jusuf	
2024	Dominion of Darkness	Thomas	
2024	Goodbye, Farewell	Rey	
2024	Love Unlike in K-Dramas	Julian	
2025	This City Is a Battlefield	Hazil	Post-production
2025	Rahasia Rasa	Ressa	
2026	Dominion of Darkness: Rephaim	Thomas	

Television

Year	Title	Role	Network	Notes
2020	Gossip Girl Indonesia	Chicco Salim	GoPlay	Main cast
2020	Work From Home	Gerry Winata	GoPlay	Main cast
2020	Indonesia's Next Top Model	Himself	NET.	Episode: "The Girl Who Skates to Standout"
2021	Love Is a Story	Tristan	Vidio	Main cast
2021	Daur Hidup	Abi	Vision+	Episode: "Bertamu"
2022	Daniel & Nicolette	Daniel	Vidio	Main cast
2023	YOLO!	Roman Raesatya	Vidio	Main cast
