= Omara Esteghlal =

Indonesian actor (born 1999)

- Born: Omara Naidra Esteghlal; 10 August 1999 (age 26); Jakarta, Indonesia
- Occupation: Actor
- Years active: 2011–present

Omara Naidra Esteghlal (born 10 August 1999) is an Indonesian actor. He rose to prominence for starring as Piyan in Dilan 1990 (2018). He won the Citra Award for Best Supporting Actor for his performance in Joko Anwar's The Siege at Thorn High at the 2025 ceremony. He had previously received a nomination in the same category for his role in Wregas Bhanuteja's Andragogy at the 2023 ceremony.

== Early life ==
Omara Naidra Esteghlal was born in Jakarta, Indonesia, on 10 August 1999. He attended the United World College, USA in Montezuma, New Mexico. In 2021, he graduated from the St. Olaf College, majoring in psychology and philosophy.

== Career ==
In 2011, Esteghlal started his acting career when he was twelve for starring in family comedy film 5 Elang. He then starred in Rudi Soedjarwo's family drama film Pasukan Kapiten a year later. After starring in the film, he took a break from acting.

In 2018, he starred in teen romance film Dilan 1990 as Piyan, the title character's best friend, and its sequel a year later. In 2021, he starred as Suharnoko Harbani, one of the seven cadets during the 1947 Police Action, in biographical war film Cadet 1947. He starred as Gora in Wregas Bhanuteja's drama film Andragogy. The film had its world premiere at the 2023 Toronto International Film Festival. For his performance, he received a Citra Award nomination for Best Supporting Actor. In the same year, he starred as Kadir in the biopic comedy film, Srimulat: Hidup Memang Komedi, based on the comedy troupe Srimulat. To prepare for the role, he met the real-life Kadir during rehearsals and learned how to mimic his movements.

In 2025, Esteghlal starred as Jefri Hariman, a troubled high school student in Joko Anwar's dystopian thriller film The Siege at Thorn High. In the same year, he starred in the leading role of Gema, an awkward young man, in Kristo Immanuel's directorial debut film Better Off Dead. In addition to acting, he also served as co-executive producer. He appeared as a tour guide on Netflix original series Romantics Anonymous.

For his portrayal as Jefri in The Siege at Thorn High, he won the Citra Award for Best Supporting Actor at the 2025 Indonesian Film Festival. In his acceptance speech, he described the character as "someone who was born out of hate and discrimination" (Note: Original: "...Karakterku, Jefri, adalah karakter yang tumbuh dari kebencian dan diskriminasi".) and ended with a message of inclusivity. "Hopefully, our country can be free from racial, ethnic, and religious discrimination, and we will continue to fight against violence," (Note: Original: "...Semoga negara kita bisa bebas dari diskriminasi ras, suku, agama, dan kita akan terus melawan kekerasan".) he declared.

== Filmography ==
=== Film ===
Year	Title	Role	Notes
2011	5 Elang	Nandi	Credited as Omara Naidra Esteghlal
2012	Pasukan Kapiten	Omar	Credited as Omar Esteghlal
2018	Dilan 1990	Piyan	
2019	Dilan 1991	Piyan	
2020	Letter from Death	Pasha	
2020	Milea	Piyan	
2021	Cadet 1947	Suharnoko Harbani	
2022	Gendut Siapa Takut?!	Nobel Ibravandya	
2022	Like & Share	Ino	
2023	The Ballads of Roy	Tony	
2023	Tulah 6/13	Kevin	
2023	Galaksi	Robert	
2023	Andragogy	Gora	
2023	Ali Topan	Bobby	
2023	Srimulat: Hidup Memang Komedi	Kadir	
2025	The Siege at Thorn High	Jefri Hariman	
2025	Better Off Dead	Gema	Also as co-executive producer

=== Television ===
Year	Title	Role	Network	Notes
2022	Kenapa Gue?	Radit	Vidio	Main role
2023	Kitab Kencan	Hermawan	Vidio	Recurring role
2023	CinLock: Love, Camera, Action!	Reyhan Dewantoro	Vision+	Main role
2024	Mengejar Maghrib	Maghrib	RCTI	Main role
2025	Bad Guys	Elias	Vidio	Main role
2025	Romantics Anonymous	Tour guide	Netflix	Episode: "Pure Kenji"
