= Friends but Married =

- Indonesian: Teman tapi Menikah
- Directed by: Rako Prijanto
- Produced by: Frederica
- Starring: Adipati Dolken; Vanesha Prescilla
- Cinematography: Hani Pradigya
- Edited by: Aline Jusria
- Music by: Andhika Triyadi
- Production company: Falcon Pictures
- Distributed by: Netflix
- Release date: 28 March 2018
- Running time: 102 minutes
- Country: Indonesia
- Language: Indonesian
- Box office: US$5.14 million

Friends but Married (Indonesian: Teman tapi Menikah, stylized as #TemanTapiMenikah) is a 2018 Indonesian drama film produced by Falcon Pictures. The film stars Adipati Dolken and Vanesha Prescilla.

== Cast ==
- Adipati Dolken as Ditto
  - Cole Gribble as young Ditto
- Vanesha Prescilla as Ayudia Bing Slamet
  - Sandrinna Michelle as young Ayu
- Refal Hady as Rifnu
- Denira Wiraguna as Dila
- Shara Virrisya as Ayu's Mother
- Sari Nila as Ditto's Mother
- Rendi Jhon as Damar
- Cut Beby Tshabina as Mila
- Diandra Agatha as Aca
- Sarah Sechan as yourself
- Iqbaal Ramadhan as himself
- Ivan Leonardy sebagai Ditto's Father
- Clay Gribble as Diko
- Atiq Rahman as Abe
- Rival Soebandri as Iqbal
- Ridwan Kamil as himself (lecturer)
- Sanca Khatulistiwa as a ball player
- Khiva Iskak as a music engineer
- Martina Tesela as floor director
- Royhan Hidayat as Ayu's acting opponent
- Meutia Pudjowarsito as a film director
- Fahmi Agelan as head of village
- Wulan Sohora as a friend of Mila 1
- Indah Alya as a friend of Mila 2
- Andarumayasa as a friend of Mila 3
- Muldani Muwahid as a concert crew

== Critical reception ==
Writing about the film for The Jakarta Post in a mixed review, Stanley Widianto writes that the film "finds its strength as a romantic comedy by eschewing forced storytelling" that "feels less like a fictional film and more like chapters of a shared diary", praising the script for its "naturalistic and heartwarming" storytelling.
