= Vanesha Prescilla =

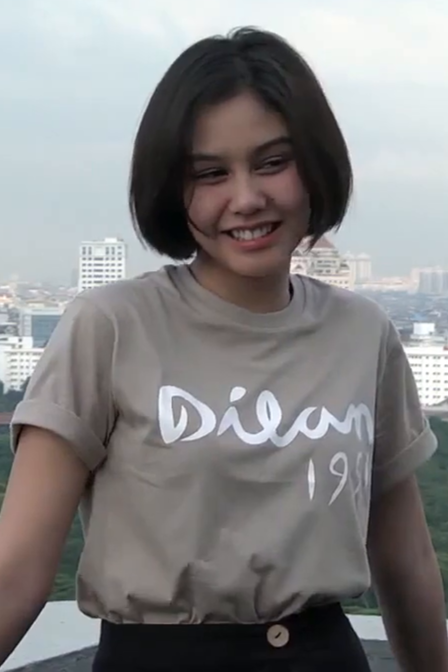
- Vanesha Prescilla in 2019
- Born: October 25, 1999 (age 26); Jakarta, Indonesia
- Occupations: Celebrity; Singer
- Years active: 2014–present
- Spouse: Faqih Yusuf Budiman
- Parent: Ida Farida Hanas (mother)
- Family: Sissy Priscillia (sister); Rifat Sungkar (brother-in-law); Jevin Julian (brother); Rinni Wulandari (sister-in-law)
- Awards: see below
- Musical career
- Instrument: Vocal

Vanesha Prescilla (born 25 October 1999) is an Indonesian actress, and singer. She is known for her role as Milea in the film trilogy, Dilan 1990, Dilan 1991, and Milea: Suara dari Dilan.

== Early life ==
Vanesha Prescilla was born on 25 October 1999 in Jakarta, Indonesia. She is the last of the three children of Iwan Setiawan dan Ida Farida Hanas. Her mother is a renowned singer in the 80s. Her older sister, Sissy Priscillia, is also an actress and model known for the film, Ada Apa dengan Cinta? (2002). Vanesha Prescilla also has an older brother, Jevin Julian, who is a musician.

== Career ==
Vanesha Prescilla started her career by becoming a finalist in the Cover Girl event in 2014.

== Filmography ==
=== Film ===
Key
†	Denotes productions that have not yet been released

Year	Title	Role	Notes	Ref.
2018	Dilan 1990	Milea Adnan Hussain	Debut	
2018	#TemanTapiMenikah	Ayudia Bing Slamet		
2019	Dilan 1991	Milea Adnan Hussain		
2020	Milea: Suara dari Dilan	Milea Adnan Hussain		
2021	Backstage	Elsa Anindita		
2023	Virgo and the Sparklings	Cempaka	Cameo	
TBA	Kata †	Binta/Senjani	Post-production	

=== Television ===
Year	Title	Role	Notes	Ref.
2021	Paradise Garden	Navya Oksana		

=== Music video ===
Year	Title	Singer	Notes	Ref.
2018	"I Don't Mind"	Vidi Aldiano, Sheryl Sheinafia & Jevin Julian		
2019	"Saling Merindu"	RAN		
2022	"Menghapus Jejakmu"	Noah & Rejoz TheGROOVE		
2022	"So Wrong But So Right"	Afgan		

== Discography ==
=== Albums ===
==== Collaborative albums ====
Year	Title	Ref.
2019	Dilan 1990 – 1991 (Original Motion Picture Soundtrack)	
2020	Voor Milea (Original Motion Picture Soundtrack)	
2021	Backstage (Original Motion Picture Soundtrack)	

=== Singles ===
==== As featured artist ====
Year	Title	Album	Notes	Ref.
2019	"Berpisah"	Non-album singles	The Panasdalam Bank featuring Vanesha Prescilla	
2020	"Bunyi Sunyi"	Non-album singles	The Panasdalam Bank featuring Vanesha Prescilla	

=== Collaborative works ===
- "Bahaya Dirimu" (2020, from the album Voor Milea (Original Motion Picture Soundtrack)) – The Panasdalam Bank, Vanesha Prescilla
- "Melangkah" (2021, from the album Backstage (Original Motion Picture Soundtrack)) – Sissy Priscillia, Vanesha Prescilla, Andi Rianto
- "Seberapa Pantas" (2021, dari album Backstage (Original Motion Picture Soundtrack)) – Sissy Priscilla, Vanesha Prescilla
- "Terbaik untukmu" (2021, dari album Backstage (Original Motion Picture Soundtrack)) – Sissy Priscilla, Vanesha Prescilla
- "I Remember" (2021, dari album Backstage (Original Motion Picture Soundtrack)) – Sissy Priscilla, Vanesha Prescilla
- "Bagaikan Langit" (2021, dari album Backstage (Original Motion Picture Soundtrack)) – Sissy Priscilla, Vanesha Prescilla

== Awards and nominations ==
Year	Award	Category	Nominated work	Result	Ref.
2018	Indonesian Movie Actors Awards	Best Newcomer Actress	Dilan 1990	Nominated	
2018	Indonesian Movie Actors Awards	Favorite Newcomer Actress	Dilan 1990	Won	
2018	Indonesian Movie Actors Awards	Best Couple (with Iqbaal Ramadhan)	Dilan 1990	Nominated	
2018	Indonesian Movie Actors Awards	Favorite Couple (with Iqbaal Ramadhan)	Dilan 1990	Won	
2018	Indonesian Television Awards	Most Popular Artist	Dilan 1990	Nominated	
2019	Anugerah Musik Indonesia	Best Original Soundtrack Production Work (with The Panasdalam Bank)	"Berpisah" (OST Dilan 1991)	Won	
2022	Kiss Awards	Most Kiss Single	–	Nominated	
