= Adhisty Zara =

Indonesian singer, performer, and actress (born 2003)

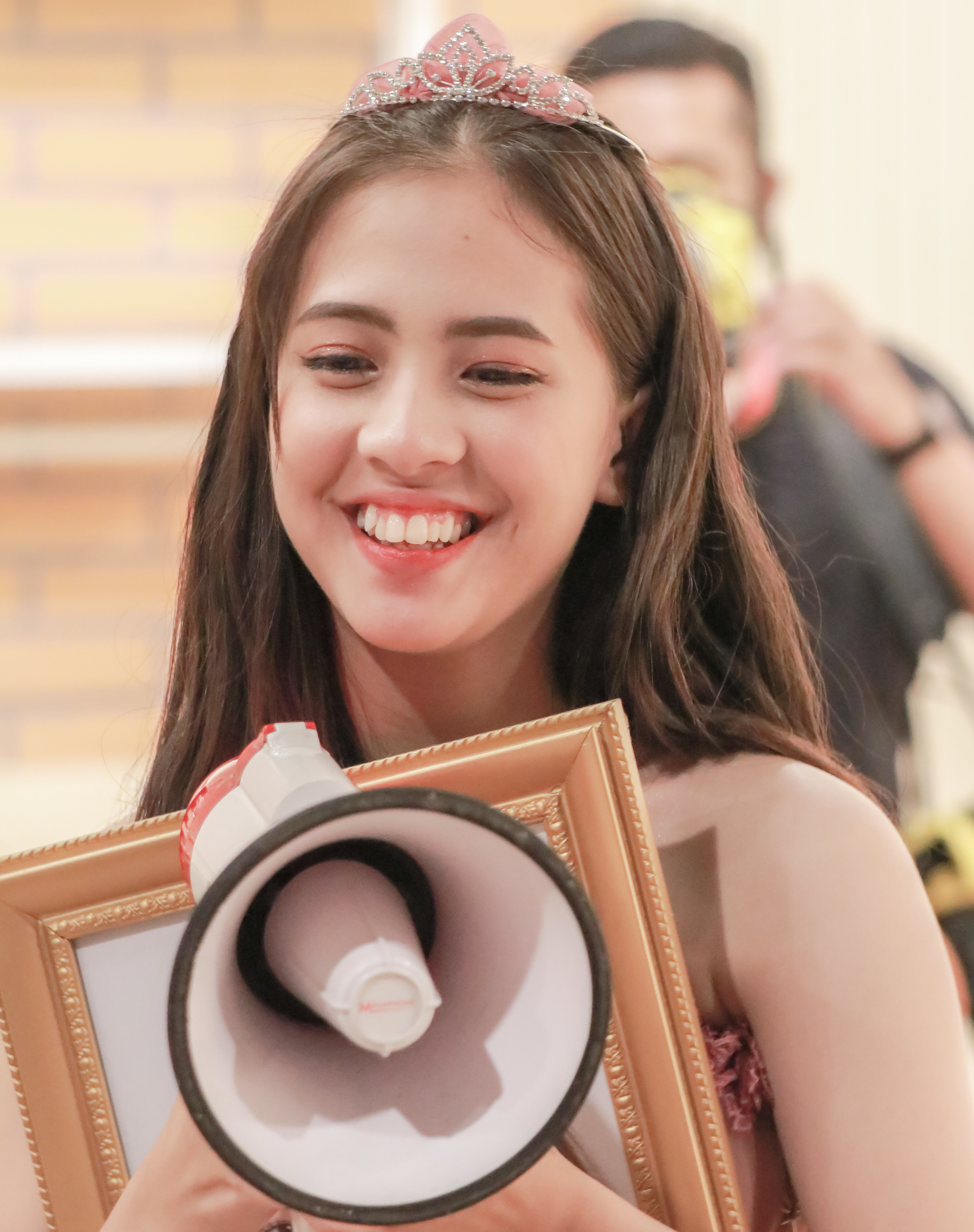
- Zara in December 2019

Background information
- Also known as: Zara JKT48 (2016–2019)
- Born: Adhisty Zarah Sundari Kusumawardhani; 21 June 2003 (age 23); Bandung, Indonesia
- Genre: J-pop
- Occupations: Singer; actress
- Instrument: Vocals
- Years active: 2016–present
- Formerly of: JKT48

Adhisty Zarah Sundari Kusumawardhani (born 21 June 2003) is an Indonesian singer and actress. She is a former member of JKT48 who joined Team T from December 1, 2016 until her graduation on December 4, 2019.

== Early life ==
Zara was born with the name Adhisty Zara Sundari Kusumawardhani on June 21, 2003 in Bandung, West Java. She is the second child of four siblings of Mario Saladin Akbar Kusumawardhana and Sofia Yulinar.

== Career ==
=== 2016–18: JKT48 and acting career ===
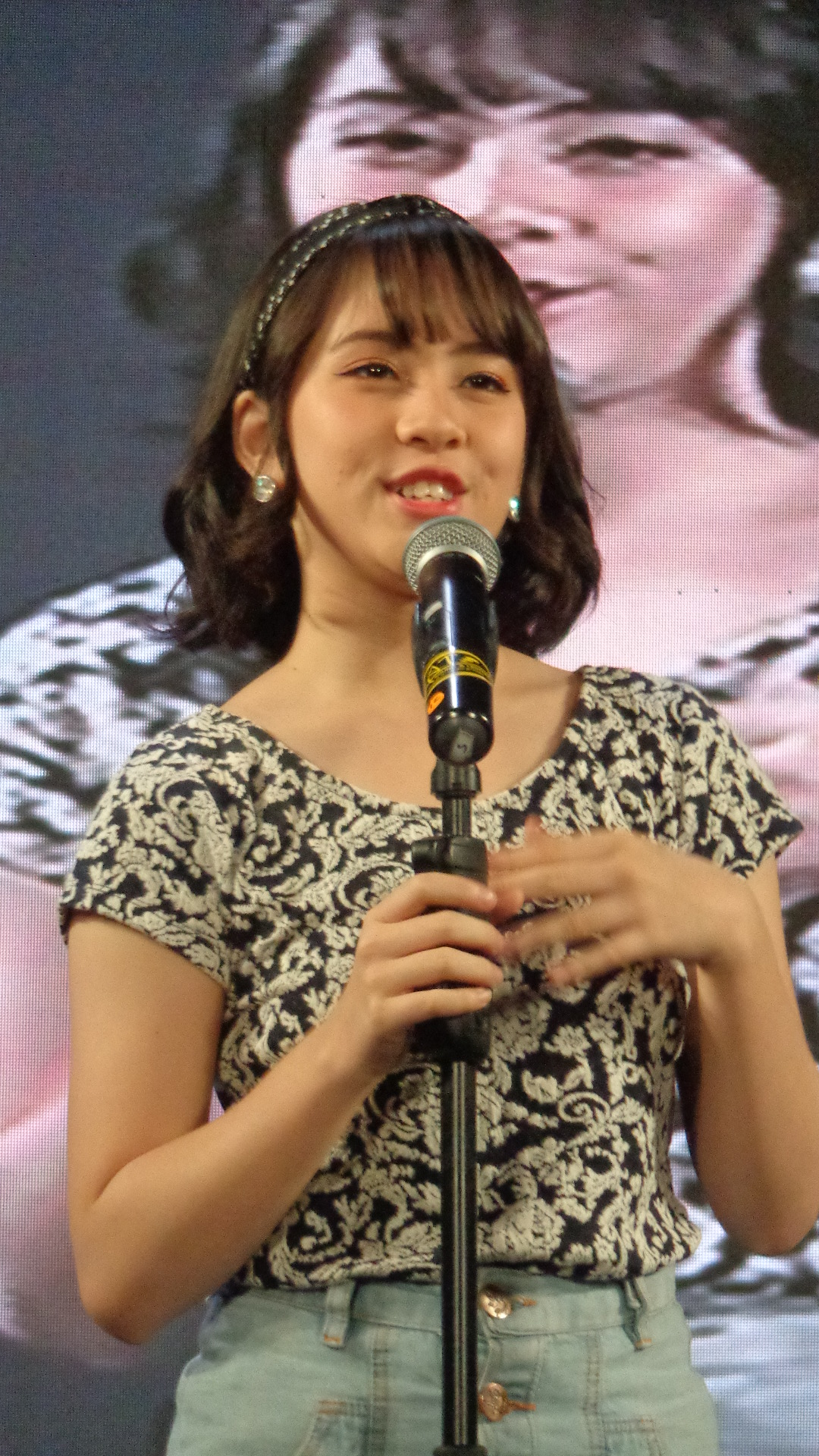
Zara in 2018

Adhisty Zara entered the showbiz industry after being introduced as a part of JKT48's 5th generation on 29 May 2016, at the age of 13. According to Zara, a staff approached and offered her to try for the audition when she was eating ice cream in front of her school. After getting selected, she traveled between Bandung and Jakarta to balance her school and the group's activity, before relocating permanently to Jakarta along with her older sister, Hasyakyla, who also joined JKT48 and both were then home-schooled.

Zara is soon promoted as an official member of the group, listed as a member of JKT48's Team T on 1 December 2016, which she centered and remained until her graduation in 2019. JKT48's 15th single "Luar Biasa" (released 21 December 2016) marked her first appearance in the group's single. She was selected again for the single "So Long!" and "Dirimu Melody" the following year. Zara started her acting career after being cast in July 2017 to portray Disa, the younger sister of the titular character in Dilan 1990. In January 2018, Zara was cast as Euis in the film Keluarga Cemara, a remake of the popular 90s soap opera.

On the double-single released by JKT48 in July 2018, "Everyday, Kachuusa/UZA", she received her first ever center position in the group's single, "Everyday, Kachuusa" as well as being chosen to perform "UZA" after an audition. Zara's selection as a center marked the group's first single to be centered by a member from JKT48's Team T. The story music video for "Everyday, Kachuusa" featured Zara, without any appearances from other selected members, and actor Abun Sungkar.

=== 2019–2023: Breakthrough and rise to prominence ===
After the release of Keluarga Cemara in January 2019, Zara won her first and second nomination at the 7th Maya Awards and 13th Indonesian Movie Actors Awards. The movie also became the country's ninth most-watched box-movie of the year.

In February 2019, it was announced she's set to star in a new movie, Dua Garis Biru, in the leading role. Shortly after the trailer release, the film received public backlash, mainly from adults, who criticized the sex-education movie for “promoting free sex” to teenagers. However, the film was a box-office hit and received positive reviews, with critics praising both the acting and writing. It became the second most-watched Indonesian film of the year, driving Zara into large public recognition. Following the success of Keluarga Cemara, Visinema Pictures announced a sequel film and television series, with the latter focusing on Zara's character.

After being selected to appear on the AKB48 Group Asia Festival in Shanghai, Zara announced that she's leaving the group to focus on her acting career in August 2019. In late August 2019, Zara and other top-tier Indonesian actressed and actors had signed to appear in the planned Bumilangit Cinematic Universe as Virgo, with Zara set to have her own film Virgo and The Sparklings. In October 2019, she was cast as lead in the Wattpad-adapted film, Mariposa, and its upcoming spin-off film. After having her farewell concert in November 2019, she officially left JKT48 the following month. It was released in March 2020 to mixed reviews and gained over 500.000 audiences its one-week run due to the pandemic; it was re-released in early 2021.

Zara starred in lead role as Sharona in Vidio's television series I Hear(t) You, which premiered in December 2020. Production for Keluarga Cemara 2 began in late 2020 and wrapped in February 2021. In March 2021, she begins production for Before I Met You. The film is scheduled for a March 2022 release date, but was canceled due rising COVID-19 numbers and instead released on Prime Video in July 2022.

Soon after wrapping the production for Before I Met You, Zara begins production for another Vidio original, Live with my Ketos, which wrapped on 6 June 2021. The previous day, she was cast as lead in Virgin the Series, a remake of early 2000s drama film. The series begins production in June and wrapped in September 2021, and premiered in January 2022 on Disney+ Hotstar. In October 2021, Disney+ Hotstar announced Keluarga Cemara the Series as one of its original production coming in 2022.

Production for Keluarga Cemara the Series begins in February 2022 and wrapped the following April. Zara reprised her role as Acha in the film 12 Cerita Glenn Anggara in April 2022. Keluarga Cemara 2 was released in June 2022, followed by Keluarga Cemara the Series in September 2022. Zara appeared as a surprise during the JKT48 10th Anniversary Concert in August 2022.

== Discography ==
=== Single ===
As the lead singer
Year	Title	Album	Notes	Ref.
2019	"Seperti Cemara"	Non-album single	With Widuri Puteri	
2022	"Harta Berharga"	Non-album single	With Widuri Puteri, Muzakki Ramdhan	
2023	"Sahabat Angin"	Virgo & The Sparklings (Original Soundtrack)		
2023	"Bersorai"	Virgo & The Sparklings (Original Soundtrack)		

Featuring singles
Year	Title	Album	Notes	Ref.
2024	"Mencintai Kehilangan"	Non-album single	With Abun Sungkar	

=== Extended play ===
Year	Title	Detail	Ref.
2023	Virgo & The Sparklings (Original Soundtrack)	Release: March 6, 2023; Label: Screenplay Bumilangit; Format: Digital	

== Filmography ==
=== Film ===
Acting roles
Year	Title	Role	Notes
2018	Dilan 1990	Disa	Debut film
2018	Cemara's Family	Euis Handayani	
2019	Dilan 1991	Disa	
2019	Two Blue Stripes	Dara Yurika	
2019	The Queen of Black Magic	Dina	
2020	Milea	Disa	
2020	Mariposa	Natasha Kay Loovi (Acha)	
2020	Lily of the Valley	Lily	Short film
2022	Happy Anniversary	Tari	Short film
2022	Keluarga Cemara 2	Euis Handayani	
2022	12 Cerita Glen Anggara	Natasha Kay Loovi (Acha)	
2022	Before I Met You	Gadis	
2023	Virgo and the Sparklings	Virgo/Riani	
2024	Munkar	Ranum	
2024	Cinta dari Timor	Bintang	
2024	Cinta dalam Ikhlas	Ara	
2025	Berebut Jenazah	Naomi Takehashi	
2025	Sihir Pelakor	Salon customers	Special appearance
2025	Bertaut Rindu	Jovanka	
2025	Tukar Takdir	Zahra	

=== Television ===
Acting roles
Year	Title	Role	Notes
2020—2021	I Hear(t) You	Sharona Armandio	Miniseries
2021	Live with My Ketos	Gabriella	Miniseries
2022	Virgin the Series	Talita Arabella Adinatha	Miniseries
2022	Keluarga Cemara the Series	Euis Handayani	Miniseries
2023	Switchover	Naomi Anna	Miniseries
2023	YOLO!	Dita Pramesti	Miniseries
2023	The Talent Agency	Self	Miniseries; episode 4
2023	The Aces	Rania	Miniseries
2024	Just Wanna Say I Love You	Nina	Miniseries; episode 1

== Awards and nominations ==
Year	Awards	Category	Work	Results	Ref.
2018	Maya Awards	Selected Child/Teen Actor/Actress	Cemara's Family	Won	
2019	Indonesian Movie Actors Awards	Best Child Actor	Cemara's Family	Won	
2019	Bandung Film Festival	Best Actress in a Leading Role in a Motion Picture	Two Blue Stripes	Nominated	
2019	Indonesian Film Festival	Best Actress	Two Blue Stripes	Nominated	
2019	Maya Awards	Best Actress	Two Blue Stripes	Nominated	
2020	Indonesian Movie Actors Awards	Favorite Female Lead Actor	Two Blue Stripes	Won	
2020	Indonesian Movie Actors Awards	Favorite Couple Actors	Two Blue Stripes	Won	
2020	Indonesian Movie Actors Awards	Best Actress	Two Blue Stripes	Nominated	
2020	Indonesian Movie Actors Awards	Best Couple Actor	Two Blue Stripes	Nominated	
2020	Golden Gate International Film Festival	Actor Female	Two Blue Stripes	Won	
2022	Indonesian Journalists Film Festival	Best Supporting Actress in a Drama Genre	Keluarga Cemara 2	Nominated	
