= Dilan 1990 =

Film by Fajar Bustomi and Pidi Baiq

- Theatrical release poster
- Directed by: Fajar Bustomi; Pidi Baiq
- Written by: Pidi Baiq; Titien Wattimena
- Based on: Dilan: Dia adalah Dilanku Tahun 1990 by Pidi Baiq
- Produced by: Ody Mulya Hidayat
- Starring: Iqbaal of Coboy Junior; Vanesha Prescilla
- Narrated by: Sissy Priscillia
- Cinematography: Dimas Imam Subhono
- Edited by: Ryan Purwoko
- Music by: Andhika Triyadi
- Production company: Max Pictures
- Release dates: 25 January 2018 (Indonesia); 29 March 2018 (Malaysia)
- Country: Indonesia
- Language: Indonesian
- Budget: Rp 11 billion $776,721
- Box office: $17.6 million

Dilan 1990 is a 2018 Indonesian coming of age romantic drama film. It is based on the novel Dilan: Dia adalah Dilanku Tahun 1990 (Dilan: He is My Dilan in 1990) by Pidi Baiq. The film stars Iqbaal of Coboy Junior and Vanesha Prescilla as the main roles, with some high-profile names in supporting, minor, or cameo roles; Farhan, Happy Salma, Adhisty Zara of idol group JKT48, and Ridwan Kamil, the then-Mayor of Bandung. The film has been watched by 6.3 million people. It is the best-selling Indonesian film of 2018 and the second best-selling Indonesian film of all time, just behind Warkop DKI Reborn: Jangkrik Boss! Part 1 with 6.8 million viewers. The film is followed by a sequel, Dilan 1991, which was released on 28 February 2019.

== Plot ==
In 1990, Milea relocates from Jakarta to Bandung with her family and enrolls at a new high school. On her first day, she meets Dilan, a charismatic student known for his rebellious reputation and leadership of a motorbike gang. Their brief encounter leaves an impression, as Dilan confidently predicts that she will one day become his girlfriend.

Dilan begins courting Milea through playful visits, phone calls, and small gifts. Although Milea is still in a long-distance relationship with her boyfriend Benni in Jakarta, she becomes increasingly uncomfortable with his aggressive and vulgar behavior. During a school trip to Jakarta, Benni confronts Milea and violently attacks her friend Nandan, accusing him of trying to take her away. After Benni insults her, Milea ends the relationship and refuses his subsequent apology.

As Milea grows closer to Dilan, the two spend time together riding his motorbike, talking late at night, and building an emotional bond. Milea persuades Dilan to distance himself from gang violence, and their relationship deepens as she becomes close to his mother and learns that he has been writing poems about her.

Tension arises when Kang Adi, Milea’s private tutor, takes her to his university against her wishes. Misunderstanding the situation, Dilan sends Milea a letter expressing hurt and disappointment. The following day, Milea searches for him at school and is confronted by Anhar, a member of Dilan’s gang, who—while intoxicated—strikes her. Upon learning of the incident, Dilan attacks Anhar in anger. Later that day, Dilan and Milea formally acknowledge their relationship, confirming the bond that has developed between them.

== Cast ==
- Iqbaal of Coboy Junior as Dilan
- Vanesha Prescilla as Milea Adnan Hussain
- Sissy Priscillia as Adult Milea Adnan Hussain (Narrator)
- Debo Andryos as Nandan
- Giulio Parengkuan as Anhar
- Omara Esteghlal as Piyan
- Yoriko Angeline as Wati
- Zulfa Maharani as Rani
- Brandon Salim as Benni
- Ira Wibowo as Dilan's mother
- Happy Salma as Milea's mother
- Farhan as Milea's father (Colonel Adnan)
- Refal Hady as Kang Adi
- Zara JKT48 as Disa
- Moira Tabina Zayn (Moira) as Airin
- Gusti Rayhan as Akew
- Tike Priatnakusumah as Bi Eem
- Yati Surachman as Bi Asih
- Rifku Wikana as Mr. Suripto
- Teddy Snada as principal
- Iang Darmawan as Mr. Rahmat
- Aris Nugraha as Mr. Atam
- Ayu Inten as Mrs. Sri
- Ira Ratih as Mrs. Rini
- Ridwan Kamil as teacher
- Joe P Project as Ato
- Polo Reza as Burhan
- Ribka Uli as Susi
- Jubran Martawidjaja as Agus
- Azzura Pinkania as Revi
- Alya FCM as Iis
- Bu Desi as Diah
- Ceu Popon as housemaid Milea
- Rahadian Putra as Benni's friend
- Aldrin Christopher as Benni's friend
- Sultan Zumma as Benni's friend
- Christian as Benni's friend
- Wahyu as jury
- Wira Mahendra as questioner
- Asep as a newspaper seller
- Dedi Mulyadi as Jajang

== Accolades ==
Award	Date of ceremony	Category	Recipient(s)	Result	Ref.
Dahsyatnya Awards	29 March 2019	Outstanding Film OST	Iqbaal Ramadhan (Rindu Sendiri)	Won	
Dahsyatnya Awards	29 March 2019	Outstanding Film OST	Ajeng KF & Najwa (Dulu Kita Masih Remaja)	Nominated	
Indonesian Box Office Movie Awards	5 April 2019	Best Director	Fajar Bustomi	Nominated	
Indonesian Box Office Movie Awards	5 April 2019	Best Screenplay	Pidi Baiq, Titien Wattimena	Nominated	
Indonesian Box Office Movie Awards	5 April 2019	Best Actress	Vanesha Prescilla	Nominated	
Indonesian Box Office Movie Awards	5 April 2019	Best Newcomer	Vanesha Prescilla	Nominated	
Indonesian Box Office Movie Awards	5 April 2019	Best Ensemble Talent	Dilan 1990	Nominated	
Indonesian Box Office Movie Awards	5 April 2019	Best Film Trailer	Dilan 1990	Nominated	
Indonesian Box Office Movie Awards	5 April 2019	Best Film Poster	Dilan 1990	Nominated	
Indonesian Box Office Movie Awards	5 April 2019	Best Original Soundtrack	The Panasdalam Bank (Dulu Kita Masih Remaja)	Nominated	
Indonesian Box Office Movie Awards	5 April 2019	Special Jury Award – Best Producer	Ody Mulya Hidayat	Won	
Indonesian Box Office Movie Awards	5 April 2019	Highest Grossing Film of 2018	Dilan 1990	Won	
Indonesian Choice Awards	29 April 2018	Movie of the Year	Dilan 1990	Won	
Indonesian Film Festival	9 December 2018	Best Leading Actor	Iqbaal Ramadhan	Nominated	
Indonesian Film Festival	9 December 2018	Best Theme Songwriter	Tarapti Iktiar Rinrin, Muhammad Abbidzar Nur Fauzan (Rindu Sendiri)	Nominated	
Indonesian Movie Actors Awards	4 July 2018	Favorite Film	Dilan 1990	Won	
Indonesian Movie Actors Awards	4 July 2018	Best Newcomer	Vanesha Prescilla	Nominated	
Indonesian Movie Actors Awards	4 July 2018	Favorite Newcomer	Vanesha Prescilla	Won	
Indonesian Movie Actors Awards	4 July 2018	Best Couple	Iqbaal Ramadhan & Vanesha Prescilla	Nominated	
Indonesian Movie Actors Awards	4 July 2018	Favorite Couple	Iqbaal Ramadhan & Vanesha Prescilla	Won	
Indonesian Television Awards	31 October 2018	Most Popular Artist	Iqbaal Ramadhan	Won	
Indonesian Television Awards	31 October 2018	Most Popular Artist	Vanesha Prescilla	Nominated	
International Film Festival & Awards Macao	14 December 2018	Variety Asian Stars: Up Next Award	Iqbaal Ramadhan	Won	
Korea Indonesia Film Festival	11 October 2018	Best Producer	Ody Mulya Hidayat	Won	
Korea Indonesia Film Festival	11 October 2018	Best Director	Fajar Bustomi & Pidi Baiq	Won	
Maya Awards	19 January 2019	Best Actor in a Leading Role	Iqbaal Ramadhan	Nominated	
Maya Awards	19 January 2019	Best New Actress	Vanesha Prescilla	Won	
Maya Awards	19 January 2019	Best Theme Song	Ajeng KF (Dulu Kita Masih Remaja)	Nominated	
Popcon Awards	23 September 2018	Feature Film – Most Memeable	Dilan 1990	Nominated	
Popcon Awards	23 September 2018	Feature Film – Idola Kawula (Dilan)	Iqbaal Ramadhan	Won	
SCTV Awards	30 November 2018	Most Popular Film	Dilan 1990	Won	
