= A World Without =

- Release poster
- Directed by: Nia Dinata
- Written by: Nia Dinata; Lucky Kuswandi
- Starring: Amanda Rawles; Maizura; Asmara Abigail
- Production company: Kalyana Shira Film
- Distributed by: Netflix
- Release date: 14 October 2021
- Running time: 106 minutes
- Country: Indonesia
- Language: Indonesian

A World Without is a 2021 Indonesian film directed by Nia Dinata, written by Dinata with Lucky Kuswandi and starring Amanda Rawles, Maizura and Asmara Abigail.

== Synopsis ==
Set in 2030, ten years after the pandemic strikes. It is a story of three best friends, Salina (Amanda Rowles), Ulfah (Maizura), and Tara (Asmara Abigail), who successfully enter a dystopian organization The Light where after about a year of development they are to marry their perfect partner at the young age of 17. The organization is led by the charismatic leader Ali Khan (Chicco Jerikho). The Light offers more of a futuristic world that empowers the younger generation with the goal to have them be the best version of who they are.

== Cast ==
- Amanda Rawles as Salina
- Maizura as Ulfah
- Asmara Abigail as Tara
- Chicco Jerikho as Ali Khan
- Jerome Kurnia as Hafiz
- Dira Sugandi as Nanik
- Richard Kyle as Aditya
- Dimas Danang as Endru
- Joko Anwar as Joko Liauw
- Willem Bevers as Frans
- Santosa Amin as Ali Khan's father
- Shalom Razade as former member of The Light
- Sri Sulanish as Grandmother
- Tatyana Akman as Reni
- Olga Lydia as News anchor
- Galabby as Santi
