= Kalam-Kalam Langit =

- Theatrical poster
- Directed by: Tarmizi Abka
- Written by: Faozan Rizal
- Starring: Dimas Seto; Meriza Febriani; Elyzia Mulachela
- Release date: 14 April 2016
- Running time: 100 minutes
- Country: Indonesia
- Language: Indonesian language

Kalam-kalam Langit is a 2016 Indonesian drama film directed by Tarmizi Abka.
