= D'Love =

- Film poster
- Directed by: Helfi Kardit
- Screenplay by: Helfi Kardit
- Produced by: Helfi Kardit; Chand Parvez Servia
- Starring: Aurelie Moeremans; Agung Saga; Rebecca Reijman; Achmad Albar; Rizki Ardianto
- Cinematography: Novy P. Kardit
- Edited by: Aziz Natandra
- Music by: Tya Subiakto Satrio
- Production companies: Bintang Timur Film (Star East Film); Dreamcatcher Pictures; Starvision Plus
- Distributed by: Starvision Plus
- Release date: July 29, 2010
- Running time: 82 minutes
- Country: Indonesia
- Language: Indonesian

D'Love is a 2010 Indonesian feature film written, directed and produced by Helfi Kardit. It stars Aurelie Moeremans, Agung Saga, Rebecca Reijman, and Achmad Albar. The film was released on July 29, 2010, and was a co-operative production from Bintang Timur Films, and Dreamcatcher Pictures, and was distributed by Starvision Plus.

== Plot ==
Elmo (Agung Saga) chooses to leave his parents' mansion after his father is found guilty in a corruption case. He lives a hard life as a street fighter at night, and still manages to attend school in the daytime. His friend Neina (Rebecca Reijman) knows that the reason he still goes to school is his love for Aprilia (Aurelie Moeremans), the daughter of a local mogul, Baskara (Ahmad Albar).
