= Sakral =

2018 Indonesian horror film

Sakral Sacred
- Theatrical release poster
- Directed by: Tema Patrosza
- Written by: Baskoro Adi
- Produced by: Dheeraj Kalwani
- Starring: Olla Ramlan; Teuku Zacky; Makayla Rose; Erika Carlina; Raquel Katie Larkin; Ninok Wiryono; Billy Boedjanger
- Cinematography: Asep Kalila
- Edited by: Firdauzi Trizkiyanto
- Music by: Ricky Lionardi
- Production companies: MD Pictures; Dee Company
- Release date: 20 September 2018 (Indonesia)
- Running time: 90 minutes
- Country: Indonesia
- Language: Indonesian

Sakral (lit. 'Sacred') is a 2018 Indonesian horror film directed by Tema Patrosza. The film stars Olla Ramlan, Teuku Zacky, Makayla Rose, Erika Carlina, Ninok Wiryono, and Billy Boedjanger. The film was released on September 20, 2018.

== Plot ==
Melina and Daniel lost one of their twins named Fiona. Her surviving child, Flora, grew up to be a moody and mysterious child. When Flora turned five years old, Melina's family experienced supernatural disturbances and the death of those closest to her, even Melina herself received death threats. Daniel tries to find out what happened to his family, which turns out to be related to their dead baby. The more Daniel uncovers the mystery, the greater the danger that lurks in his family's lives.

== Cast ==
- Olla Ramlan as Melina
- Teuku Zacky as Daniel
- Makayla Rose as Flora
- Erika Carlina as Bianca / Ghost
- Raquel Katie Larkin as Jessica
- Ninok Wiryono as Hastuti
- Billy Boedjanger as Psychiatrist

== Production ==
The film is Olla Ramian's debut on the big screen. Part of the filming took place in Klaten. The director's idea was to blend romance and horror.

== Release ==
The film was released on September 20, 2018, with a strong opening.
