= Iqbaal Ramadhan =

Indonesian actor and singer (born 1999)

Iqbaal
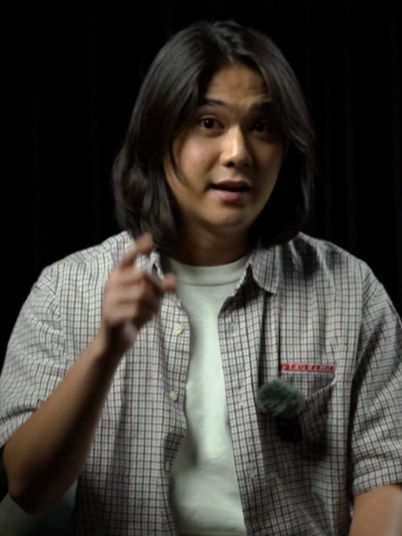
- Iqbaal Ramadhan in 2022
- Born: Iqbaal Dhiafakhri Ramadhan; 28 December 1999 (age 26); Surabaya, East Java, Indonesia
- Occupation: Singer
- Years active: 2010–present
- Musical career
- Genres: Pop; alternative rock; dance-pop; pop punk; experimental R&B
- Instruments: Vocals; guitar; bass guitar
- Labels: Inbek (2011–2017); Music Factory Indonesia (2015–2017); IDR Management (2018–present)

Iqbaal Dhiafakhri Ramadhan (born 28 December 1999) is an Indonesian actor and singer. He is best known as an ex-member of the Indonesian boy band CJR (also known as Coboy Junior, and for his leading role in Dilan 1990 (2018). In 2018, he won the Variety Asian Star: Up Next award at the International Film Festival & Awards Macao for his role in that drama.

== Early life ==
Iqbaal was born on 28 December 1999 and is the son of Herry Hernawan and his wife Rike Dhamayanti. Fildza Hasnamudia is his elder sister.

== Career ==
He made his public debut as Trapani in the musical drama Laskar Pelangi (2010–2011). There he met with Coboy Junior producer Patrick Effendy. He also played a role in the movie 5 Elang as Rusdi Badruddin in 2011, and had a single titled "Thank You". Iqbaal later became a founding member of boy band Coboy Junior, which was officially formed on July 23, 2011. In his career with Kiki, Aldi, and Bastian in Coboy Junior, he starred in the drama series Only You. In June 2013, Iqbaal and Coboy Junior released their debut film, entitled Coboy Junior The Movie.

On February 23, 2014, after the resignation of Coboy Junior member Bastian, Management decided to change the name of the band, which then only consisted of three people, to CJR.

In addition to activities in CJR, he also made a single devoted to his fans, SoniQ. He is also known as a teenager who performs many positive programs, such as singing for fans, #SoniQSaving, #SoniQGoBetter, and the latest one is #SoniQSoldiers.

In 2015, he formed a quartet pop punk band called The Second Breaktime with his high school mates. The band cited All Time Low and 5 Seconds of Summer as influences. Iqbaal also made a new group called Svmmerdose with Tararin. Iqbaal serves as both vocalist and guitarist.

In 2018, he played Dilan in the teenage drama film Dilan 1990, adapted from Pidi Baiq's best-selling novel Dilanku 1990. On May 25, 2018, it was announced that he would play Minke, a native who is able to enroll in an exclusive school for the Dutch, in Bumi Manusia, a film based on the Pramoedya Ananta Toer's novel of the same name.

== Education ==
Iqbaal graduated from Armand Hammer United World College of the American West, New Mexico, after attending on a United World Colleges (UWC) scholarship as the only representative from Indonesia in his year. He has a degree in Communication Science after completing his studies in late-2023 at Monash University, Melbourne, Australia.

== Brand ambassador ==
As of 2018, Iqbaal was appointed as brand ambassador of digital education platform Ruangguru

== Filmography ==
=== Film ===
Year	Title	Role	Director(s)
2011	5 Elang (5 Eagles)	Rusdi	Rudy Soedjarwo
2013	Coboy Junior The Movie	Iqbaal	Anggy Umbara
2014	Comic 8	Iqbaal	Anggy Umbara
2015	CJR The Movie: Lawan Rasa Takutmu (CJR The Movie: Fight Your Fear)	Iqbaal	Patrick Effendy
2016	Ada Cinta di SMA (There's Love in High School)	Iqbaal	Patrick Effendy
2018	Dilan 1990	Dilan	Fajar Bustomi, Pidi Baiq
2019	Dilan 1991	Dilan	Fajar Bustomi, Pidi Baiq
2019	Bumi Manusia (This Earth of Mankind)	Minke	Hanung Bramantyo
2020	Milea: Suara dari Dilan	Dilan	Fajar Bustomi, Pidi Baiq
2021	Ali & Ratu Ratu Queens	Ali	Lucky Kuswandi
2022	Stealing Raden Saleh	Piko	Angga Dwimas Sasongko
2025	Sleep No More	Bona	Edwin

=== Television ===
Year	Title	Network
2012	Coboy Junior: Hanya Kamu (Coboy Junior: Only You)	RCTI
2013	Coboy Junior: Hanya Kamu#eeeaa 2 (Coboy Junior: Only You#eeeaa 2)	RCTI
2013	Coboy Junior	Antv
2015–16	Let's Play With Nyam Nyam	MNC TV

== Discography ==
=== Albums ===
==== With Coboy Junior ====
- CJR (2013)

==== With CJR ====
- Lebih Baik (2015)

==== Solo albums ====
- Songs For SoniQ I EP (2013)
- Songs For SoniQ II EP (2014)
- Songs For SoniQ III EP (2015)

==== With The Second Breaktime ====
- The Second Breaktime EP (2016)

==== With Svmmerdose ====
- She/her/hers (2019)
- Yeah Yeah Youth (2021)

=== With BAALE ===
- Cinta Luka Sempurna (EP) (2024)
- Fortuna (2024)
- Yang Kutakuti (2025)
- Kita Melawan Dunia (2026)

=== Singles ===
- "Terima Kasih" (2011)
- "Jenderal Kancil" (with Coboy Junior) (2012)
- "Ngaca Dulu Deh" (with Coboy Junior) (2013)
- "Life is Bubble Gum" (with CJR) (2014)
- "Juara Dunia" (with CJR) (2014)
- "Goyang Joget" (with CJR) (featuring Indra Bekti) (2014)
- "Warnai Pelangi" (featuring SFS Family) (2015)
- "Jika Bisa Memilih" (with CJR)(2016)
- "Independent" (with Svmmerdose) (2017)
- "Rindu Sendiri" (2018)
- "Got It All" (with Svmmerdose) (2018)
- "Hello You" (2018)
- "Crush" (with Svmmerdose) (2019)
- "Break My Walls" (with Svmmerdose) (2019)

== Tours ==
- CJR Generation (2013)

== Music videos ==
- "Bermain Dengan Hatiku – The Rain" (2010)
- "2nd Anniversary SoniQ" (2013)
- "Songs From SoniQ 2013" (2013)
- "3rd Anniversary SoniQ" (2014)
- "Songs From SoniQ 2014" (2014)
- "4th Anniversary SoniQ" (2015)
- "5th Anniversary SoniQ" (2016)
- "Warnai Pelangi" (2016)
- "Yang Terdalam – Noah (2022)"

== Musical dramas ==
- Laskar Pelangi (2010–2011)

== Incident ==
On the morning of 22 June 2015 Ramadhan was involved in a motorcycle accident in Bekasi, West Java, after attending morning prayers.

== Awards and nominations ==
Name of the award ceremony, year presented, category, nominee of the award, and the result of the nomination
Award ceremony	Year	Category	Nominee / Work	Result	Ref.
Bandung Film Festival	2020	Best Actor in a Leading Role	Bumi Manusia	Won	
Dahsyatnya Awards	2019	Outstanding Film OST	"Rindu Sendiri" – Dilan 1990	Won	
Indonesian Box Office Movie Awards	2019	Best Ensemble Talent	Dilan 1990	Nominated	
Indonesian Film Festival	2018	Best Actor	Dilan 1990	Nominated	
Indonesian Film Festival	2021	Best Actor	Ali & Ratu Ratu Queens	Nominated	
Indonesian Film Festival	2021	Best Theme Songwriter (with Tarapti Ikhtiar Rinrin)	"On My Own" – Ali & Ratu Ratu Queens	Nominated	
Indonesian Movie Actors Awards	2018	Best Couple (with Vanesha Prescilla)	Dilan 1990	Nominated	
Indonesian Movie Actors Awards	2018	Favorite Couple (with Vanesha Prescilla)	Dilan 1990	Won	
Indonesian Movie Actors Awards	2021	Best Ensemble	Ali & Ratu Ratu Queens	Nominated	
Indonesian Reporters Film Festival	2021	Best Actor – Drama	Ali & Ratu Ratu Queens	Nominated	
Indonesian Social Media Awards	2016	Male Celeb Instagram	Iqbaal Ramadhan	Nominated	
Indonesian Social Media Awards	2016	Male Celeb Snapchat	Iqbaal Ramadhan	Won	
Indonesian Television Awards	2018	Most Popular Artist	Dilan 1990	Won	
International Film Festival & Awards • Macao	2018	Variety Asian Star: Up Next Award	Dilan 1990	Won	
Kiss Awards	2022	Jomblo Terkiss	Iqbaal Ramadhan	Nominated	
LINE Indonesia Awards	2019	Most Favorite Actor	Dilan 1991, Bumi Manusia	Nominated	
LINE Today Choice	2021	Icon of the Year	Iqbaal Ramadhan	Won	
Maya Awards	2019	Best Actor in a Leading Role	Dilan 1990	Nominated	
Maya Awards	2022	Best Actor in a Leading Role	Ali & Ratu Ratu Queens	Nominated	
Panasonic Gobel Awards	2013	Favorite Child Star	Iqbaal Ramadhan	Nominated	
Parfi Awards	2020	Best Actor – Drama	Dilan 1991	Won	
Popcon Awards	2018	Feature Film – Idola Kawula (Dilan)	Dilan 1990	Won	
Social Media Awards	2019	Prominent Figure with Positive Sentiment in Social Media – Actor	Iqbaal Ramadhan	Won	
Social Media Awards	2020	Prominent Figure with Positive Sentiment in Social Media – Actor	Iqbaal Ramadhan	Won	
Xposure Choice	2021	The Most Xposure Actor	Ali & Ratu Ratu Queens	Won	
