= Happy Salma =

Indonesian actress, model, and writer

Jero Happy Salma Wanasari
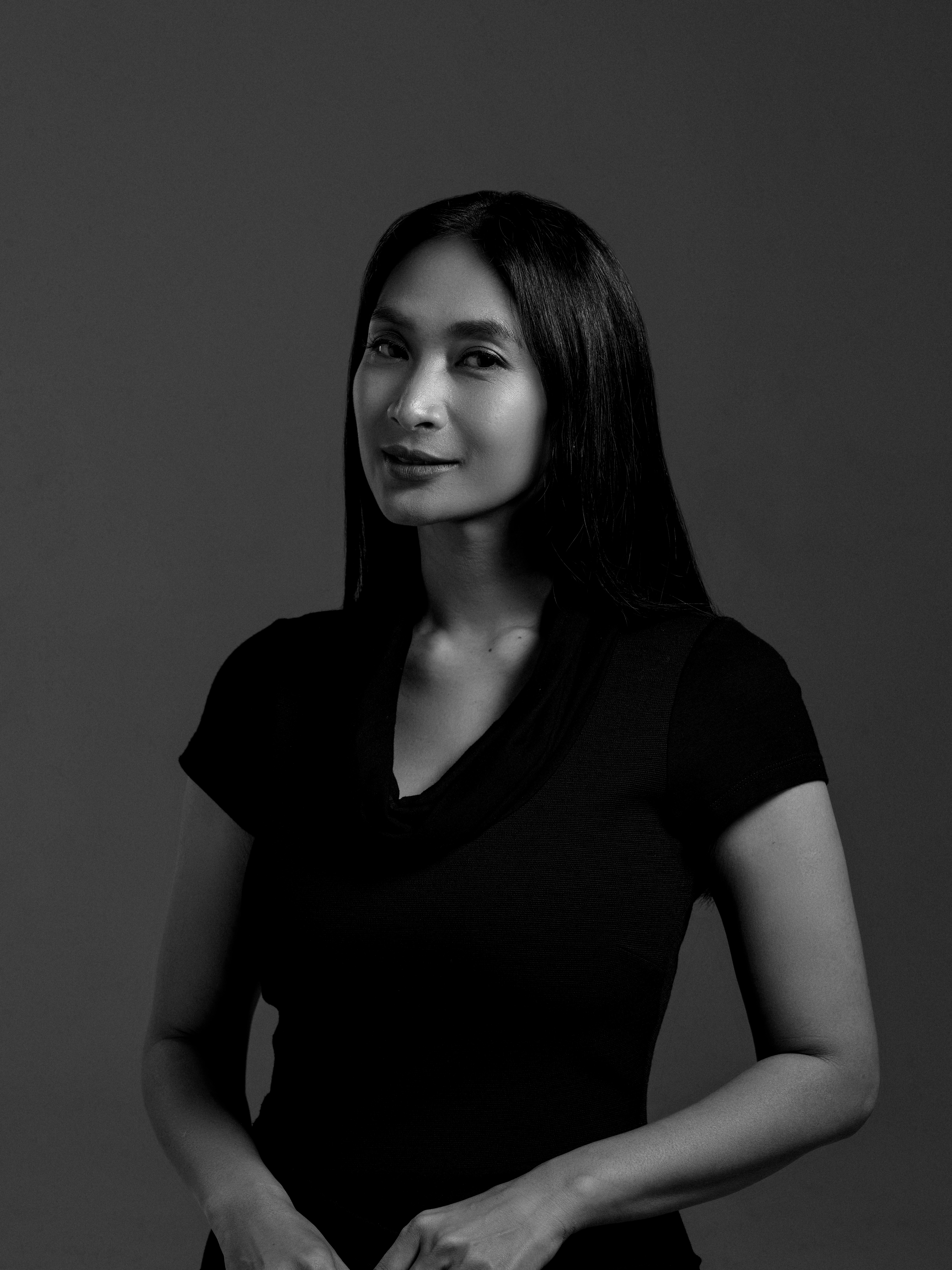
- Happy Salma in 2012
- Born: January 4, 1980 (age 46); Sukabumi, West Java, Indonesia
- Occupations: Celebrity, Writer, Theatrical producer
- Spouse: Tjokorda Bagus Dwi Santana Kertayasa (2010)
- Children: 2
- Parent(s): Dachlan Suhendra (father); Iis Rohaeni (mother)
- Awards: Citra Award (2010)

Jero Happy Salma Wanasari (born 4 January 1980), known professionally as Happy Salma, is an Indonesian actress, theater producer and jewelry entrepreneur. In 2020, Tatler Asia named her as one of the most influential figures in Asia.

== Career ==
Happy Salma was born in Sukabumi, West Java, on 4 January 1980 to Dachlan Suhendra and Iis Rohaeni, she is the fourth of the couple's six children. She enjoyed writing and reading from an early age. She graduated from Trisakti University with a degree in business administration.

Salma originally entered the entertainment industry as a model. She later appeared in numerous sinetron (Indonesian soap operas), including Bujangan (Single Man), Kutunggu Cintamu (I Wait for your Love), and Cowok-Cowok Keren (Cool Guys). In 2005 she acted in Gie, Indonesia's official entry for Best Foreign Language Film at the 78th Academy Awards.

In 2009, Salma was chosen as one of the celebrity icons for Balai Pustaka's reprint of eight classics of Indonesian literature in a special Indonesian Cultural Heritage Series. She represented Sitti Nurbaya.

=== Literature ===
Happy Salma started her career in the entertainment industry as an actress in numerous sinetron (Indonesian soap operas). While pursuing her career in the entertainment industry, she realized her passion in Indonesian literature. She published two short stories books, namely Pulang (2006) which was nominated for Khatulistiwa Literary Award and Telaga Fatamorgana (2008). Her short stories also featured in Titian: Anthology of Popular Short Stories (2008), Lobakan: Short Story Anthology (2009), 24 Sauh Short Story Collaboration (2009) and Dari Murai ke Sangkar Emas (2009). In addition, Happy Salma wrote a collaborative novel with Pidi Baiq entitled Hanya Salju dan Pisau Batu (2010). Lately, she wrote and published a creative biography of Desak Nyoman Suarti "The Warrior Daughter" (2015).

=== Theater ===
Her passion in literature also led her to the theater or art performances. Her first debut on stage in 2007 as Nyai Ontosoroh in a performance entitled "Nyai Ontosoroh". In 2009, Happy Salma played a monologue "Ronggeng Dukuh Paruk" in Amsterdam, Bern-Swiss, and Taman Ismail Marzuki, whose story was adapted from the novel Ronggeng Dukuh Paruk by Ahmad Tohari and then followed by another performance, namely "Jabang Tetuko" (2011), Java War "Opera Diponegoro" (2011), "Monolog Inggit" (2011 - 2014), "Roro Mendut" (2012), "#3Perempuanku, Bukan Bunga Bukan Lelaki" (2015), several theater performances with "Indonesia Kita" and again played a role as Nyai Ontosoroh in "Bunga Penutup Abad" (2016 - 2017).

In line with her love and passion in art performances, Happy Salma founded a Titimangsa Fondation for arts and culture, which produced numerous major performances, such as Nyanyi Sunyi Revolusi and Cinta Tak Pernah Sederhana in 2019.

=== Film ===
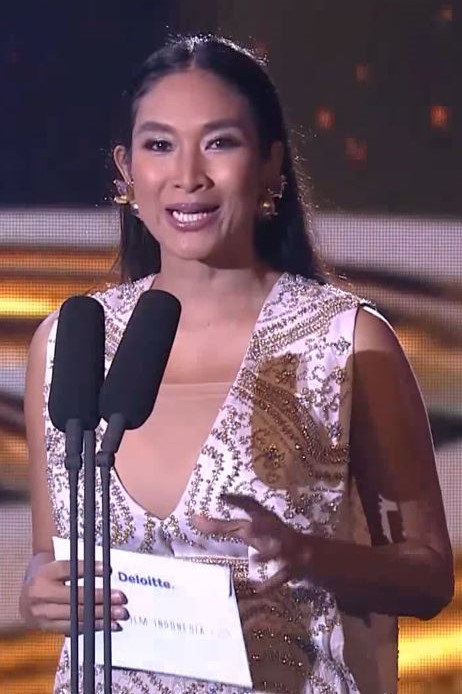
Happy Salma at the Indonesian Film Festival, 2015

Happy Salma has received many awards for acting, including: Best Supporting Actress at the 2008 Bandung Film Festival (Rinduku Cintamu), Best Supporting Actress at the 2010 Indonesian Film Festival (7 Hati 7 Cinta 7 Wanita), Best Supporting Actress and Favorite Supporting Actress at the 2011 Indonesian Movie Awards (7 Hati 7 Cinta 7 Wanita), Best Actress Award by Jakarta Art Institute in 2014, as well as Best Performance and Best Short Film in Plaza Indonesia Short Film Festival 2016 for short film "Ibu dan Anak Perempuannya".

Apart from being actress, Happy Salma is a film director. She directed an omnibus film 'Rectoverso' along with Marcella Zalianty, Olga Lidya, Cathy Sharon, and Rachel Maryam. She directed a shot film "Kamis ke-300" and "Ibu dan Anak Perempuannya".

In 2020, Happy Salma directed a series entitled "Masakan Rumah" which were screened in Mola TV.

On 12 February 2022, actress Happy Salma attended the premiere of the competition film "Nana" (Before, Now & Then) directed by Kamila Andini at The 72nd Berlin International Film Festival. According to Hollywood Reporter, the response to the film was positive in critical spaces, if not in the larger market.

In 2022, Happy Salma won Best Female Lead at the 2022 Indonesian Movie Actors Awards (IMAA) for her role as Nana in the film Before, Now, and Then (Nana). She also won Movie Actress of The Year by Film Pilihan Tempo 2022 for her role in the film Before, Now, and Then (Nana).

=== Tulola Jewelry ===
Beside acting and literature, Happy Salma also manage a jewelry business under the brand Tulola, which she founded with Sri Luce Rusna and Franka Makarim. Tulola has a unique concept with design that explore Indonesian literature, culture, and nature. Happy Salma has a role as Founder and Creative Conceptor. She adapt the initial inspiration to be created into jewelry design. For example, jewelry product that inspired by Indonesian music 'keroncong' is Juwita Malam Collection. In 2013, Tulola launched "Pitaloka" Collection that inspired by a tale of the Bubat War in 1367 and beautiful Sundanese princess Dyah Pitaloka Citraresmi. In 2015, Tulola launched "Women of Bumi Manusia" that inspired by a great Indonesian literature namely Bumi Manusia or This Earth of Mankind written by Pramoedya Ananta Toer. Then, Tulola launched many series of collection including "Lingkaran Semesta" (2016), "Truth" (2017), "Ubud" (2018), "Dewi Sri" (2018), "Perjalanan Kenangan" (2019), "Puspita" (2019) inspired by 5 character of Yogyakarta Princess (Putri Keraton Yogyakarta), "Nusantara" (2019) a collaboration with Indonesian actor Reza Rahadian, Indonesian singer Andien and Eva Celia, "Dengan Tanganku, Aku Merakit Mimpimu" (2019) inspired by a book entitled "Kuantar ke Gerbang" written by Ramadhan K.H., and "Jiwa Penuh Sinar" (2021).

Tulola now has several stores in Bali and Jakarta, including Seminyak, Kemang, Plaza Senayan, and Plaza Indonesia. For further information about Tulola Jewelry can be found at www.shoptulola.com

== Personal life ==
On 3 October 2010, Happy Salma married Tjokorda Bagus Dwi Santana Kertayasa, a Balinese Prince from Ubud. They married at the Ubud Palace, Gianyar Regency, Bali. The couple have two children: Tjokorda Sri Kinandari Kerthyasa (b. 2015) and Tjokorda Ngurah Rayidaru Kerthyasa (b. 2018).

She converted from Islam to Hinduism upon marriage, becoming queen and a member of the Lordship of Ubud.

== Book ==
- "Pulang" (2006)
- "Telaga Fatamorgana" (2008)
- "Hanya Salju dan Pisau Batu" (2010), a collaboration with Pidi Baiq
- "The Warrior Daughter" (2015), a creative biography of Desak Nyoman Suarti

== Awards and nominations ==
Year	Award	Category	Work	Result
2010	Indonesian Film Festival	Citra Award for Best Supporting Actress	7 Hati 7 Cinta 7 Wanita	Won
2013	Indonesian Film Festival	Citra Award for Best Leading Actress	Air Mata Terakhir Bunda	Nominated
2011	Indonesian Movie Actor Awards	Best Supporting Actress	7 Hati 7 Cinta 7 Wanita	Won
2011	Indonesian Movie Actor Awards	Favourite Supporting Actress	7 Hati 7 Cinta 7 Wanita	Won
