= Armenians in Indonesia =

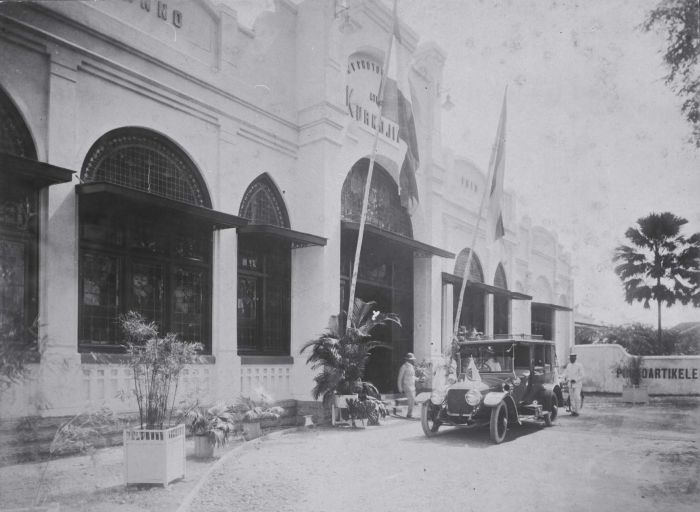
- The N. V. Photografisch Atelier Kurkdjian photographic studio in Surabaya, East Java (1910-1940)

Total population
- ~100

Regions with significant populations
- Surabaya and Jakarta

Languages
- Armenian, Dutch, Indonesian

Religion
- Armenian Apostolic Church

Many Armenian merchants from Amsterdam, Isfahan and Madras went to Southeast Asia, particularly the Dutch East Indies in the 19th century to trade, and to set up factories and plantations, Armenian merchants would settle in various parts of the Dutch East Indies. Although interactions between Armenians and the region of modern day Indonesia are believed to have started centuries earlier, with the oldest recorded Armenian community being in 1659.

== History ==
Armenians are believed to have frequented the islands of modern day Indonesia since at least the 6th-Century, traveling as merchants and traders in search of Camphor and spices, a trade that is largely centered in the ancient city of Barus, located in present day North Sumatra.

Dutch colonial records had a mention of an Armenian man named Codja Solima residing in the city of Makassar, then a part of the Sultanate of Gowa, in 1659, this was the first instance of a recorded Armenian community in the country.

In 1801, Haroution Zakaria, born in Julfa, Istahan in 1712 and died on 28 November 1801 at the age of 89. became the first recorded Armenian man to have died in the colony, he was buried in Batavia within a public cementary.

In 1808, with a growing community, George Manook (Gevork Manuch Merchell) along with others, securing 25,000 Guilders from the Dutch Government, established schools and a church. In 1852 Haileian Miabanse Thioen in Batavia, helped to open orphanages and schools for Armenian children. The community also built a small chapel in Batavia and founded a school in 1855.

Starting in the mid 18th century, Armenian communities in Madras have also began frequented Java as merchants and traders, its first three pioneers, Vardon Gasparian, Manuck Hacobdjanian and Johannes M. Sherimanian. The first two of the latter, after many years of success trade later returned to Madras with substantial wealth, the success story entices further migration of Armenians of Madras into the colony, up until Indonesia's independence, the Armenian community of Madras were closely tied with the Armenians within the country.

In 1841, Hakob Haroutynian established the first proper Armenian church within the colony in Batavia, which caters to its Armenian community.

In 1865, names like Galistan, Lazar, Joseph Amir, Manook, Arakiel Navaran, and Stefan Arathoon appeared in commercial almanacs. In the sugar industry, Manook Jordan owned the Mlongo factory, and P. Andreas owned the Trangkil factory.

On 6 January 1880, the Armenian community was formally recognised as an incorporated society by the Dutch government. Within a short time Armenians extended also to Singapore where they were involved in the opium trade, which was under British control, while some Armenian missionaries went on to the Philippines.

Starting in the 19th century, the cultural center for the Armenian community in the Dutch East Indies had shifted from Batavia to Soerabaja. by this time, Istafan, Basra, Madras and Soerabaja are the most important cities for Armenian traders and merchants.

Starting in the early 20th century, Armenian communities had been established on various parts in the colony, most notable ones being in Batavia, Soerabaja, Malang, Chirebon, Kediri, Bandoeng, Djokjakarta, Medan, Palembang, Bali and Makassar.

Most of the original Armenian community has left Indonesia after its independence. However, there was an estimated number of less than a hundred people that were still residing there, including in Java. This can be seen through few families that held family names such as Djorgi, Tankian, Haylian, Manook and Galistan.

== Notable Armenians ==
- George Manook, was among the richest figures in Dutch East India, and often lent the Dutch government funds. He left behind a large fortune of five million guilders when he died.
- The Sarkies Brothers, known for founding a chain of luxury hotels throughout Southeast Asia, owns several properties throughout the colony, the most notable being the Kartika Wijaya hotel in Batu, East Java, which was originally a private vacation villa for the Sarkies family.
- Benjamin Galstaun, Conservationist, first director of Ragunan Zoo, receiver of 1977 Ramon Magsaysay Award.
- Lucas Martin Sarkies (1876–1941), the son of Martin Sarkies, founder of the Hotel Majapahit (formerly Hotel Oranje).

== See also ==
- Armenian diaspora
- Armenians in Surabaya
- Armenia–Indonesia relations
- Ethnic groups in Indonesia
