= Armenians in Surabaya =

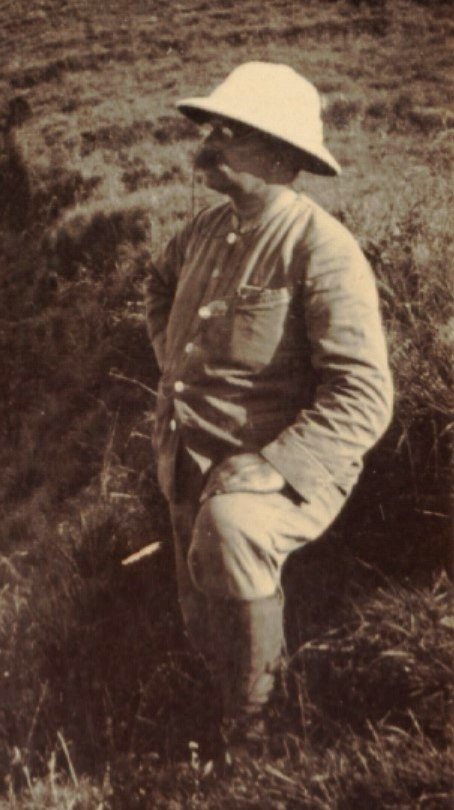
Ohannes Kurkdjian, notable Armenian photographer who lived in Surabaya

Armenians first traveled to Java towards the end of the 18th century. They established several well-known commercial houses engaged in trade with overseas markets.

== History ==
=== Armenian Church in Surabaya ===
Armenians built a church in each settlement. In 1831, a famous Armenian merchant in Batavia, Jacob Arrathoon, who represented the firm of Shamirians in India, erected a wooden church calling it the Church of St Hripsima, later renamed the Church of Holy Resurrection. The wooden church was damaged by fire in early 1844. Jacob Arrathoon quickly repaired the damage, but died shortly after on January 19. His widow Mary replaced the wooden church with one of stone and mortar; it was completed in 1854, and was renamed the Church of St John.

Mrs Mary Arrathoon and by her maiden sister Thagoohie Manook supported the church financially. Both sisters inherited the entire wealth of their bachelor brother George Manook, who had devoted a part of this legacy towards construction of this stone church. The church was situated in a very central part of Batavia (Jakarta), on the crossroads of the famous Royal Park renamed Medan Merdeka. In 1961, the new Indonesian government claimed the ground on which the Armenian church stood since 1831, and the church was demolished. Only 20 people were left in Batavia (Jakarta) of the Armenian community after the exodus. The last church service was offered by Rev Aramais Mirzaian, who had come from Sydney.

The Surabaya church was built by the same benefactors who built the Armenian church of St. John in Batavia. It was the centre of religious, social, educational, and national life of Armenians in Surabaya. Beside the church, there were living quarters for the priest and his family. There was the Edgar Hall with a stage for performing stage plays, concerts, lecturers and singers coming sometimes from overseas. The Manook Arrathoon school had three classrooms where Armenian religion history was taught twice a week on Mondays, and Thursdays from 4 to 6 in the afternoons. Sunday school was also held there.

=== World War II and the Battle of Surabaya ===
During the Japanese occupation, many Armenians were imprisoned, harassed and killed. Some were arrested by the Kempeitai, tortured and later released.

The British with the Gurkhas bombarded Surabaya, causing the Indonesians to rebel. In the suburb of Kranggan many people were killed and their bodies not found. Among them were five Armenian men who were beheaded with bamboo spears.

Many Armenians were taken by ship to Singapore and accommodated in camps. After six months they were sent back to their homeland in Indonesia, but many chose to relocate. Many went to the Netherlands and from there they moved to the United States, U.K. and Australia.

The families of those Armenians who stayed behind took shelter in the church hall and school rooms because it was not safe. They received help and encouragement from then Rev. Khoren Kirakosian.

== Religious beliefs and festivals ==
The Armenians observe Christmas on 6 January.

Armenian and Eastern Orthodox churches consider Easter a greater festival than Christmas, and have certain holiday traditions.

Many members of the Armenian Church fast for 40 days before Easter. Dairy and meat products are prohibited and a strict vegetarian and vegan diet is followed.

The traditional Easter Eve meal consists of pilaf, herb omelet, and nazook (a kind of pastry) yogurt, and coloured eggs. Cracking eggs this means new life that symbolizes the resurrection of Christ from the tombs. The holy week starts on Palm Sunday, with large events on the following Monday and Thursday when the priest will wash the feet of children like Christ did before the last Supper. This occurs during a mass which spans for almost four hours.

The Armenian Apostolic Church has seven sacraments, namely:

1. Baptism
2. Conformation
3. Penance
4. Holy Eucharist
5. Holy Matrimony
6. Holy Orders
7. Sacraments of the sick

== Education ==
The first principal of the Manook Arrathoon School was Mr. T. C. Jordan a studious person, mastery in Armenian had a good knowledge of Dutch, English and a fair bit of German and French. Author of the 'Armenians in the Netherlands Indies', written in Armenian vernacular printed in 1937 in Jerusalem. He was 76 yrs old when he wrote this book. It is pity, due to niggling dissensions this first and only edition of the book was not distributed or sold.

Mr. M. S. Marcar, president of the General Board of the Armenian community to Java, was in charge of the whole stock of the books and died in the Japanese concentration camp at Bandung. Some say that the books were lost during the Japanese occupation; others say that they were burnt before or during that occupation. There remains however some slight consolation in the fact that a few copies which the author had presented to his intimate friends have been treasured, Mr. J. C. Jordan was married but had no children. Aged 80, he died on 7 October.

The three classrooms of the Manook Arrathoon School were erected by Mr. Lucas M Sarkies at his own expense in memory of his deceased brother Thomas. Mr. Sarkies was also the owner of the well-known Oranje hotel later renamed L.M.S hotel and hotel Sarkies which he took over from his brother Mr. John. M. Sarkies who went back to Julfa, Iran. There were other Armenians who had small boarding houses.

== Sports ==
The Armenian Sports Club (ASC) in Surabaya was established by Mr. Mac Hacobian in 1923. Through the intermediary of close friend Dr Dykerman, Lord Mayor of Surabaya, he was able to secure the extensive sporting grounds at Karang Menjangan and organized the Ninehole Course Golf Club, one of the leading golf clubs in Java. It had prominent Dutch, Danish, British and Japanese members besides the Armenians. The colony's governor was its patron and Surabaya's lord mayor was the honorary president. The club was very successful and prospered.

The ASC also hosted other activities: golf basketball, tennis, hockey, football, bridge, and backgammon. Mr. Hacobian also organized the dramatic society of Surabaya and a branch committee of the Armenian benevolent society and helped with erection of the Armenian church of St George in Surabaya. He received the order of deacon by the venerable archbishop Mesrobe Magistros D.D. who was on a pastoral visit. This allowed him to preach and hold church services.

== See also ==
- Armenians in Indonesia
- Armenian Diaspora
