= Al-Makmur Mosque =

Mosque in Jakarta, Indonesia

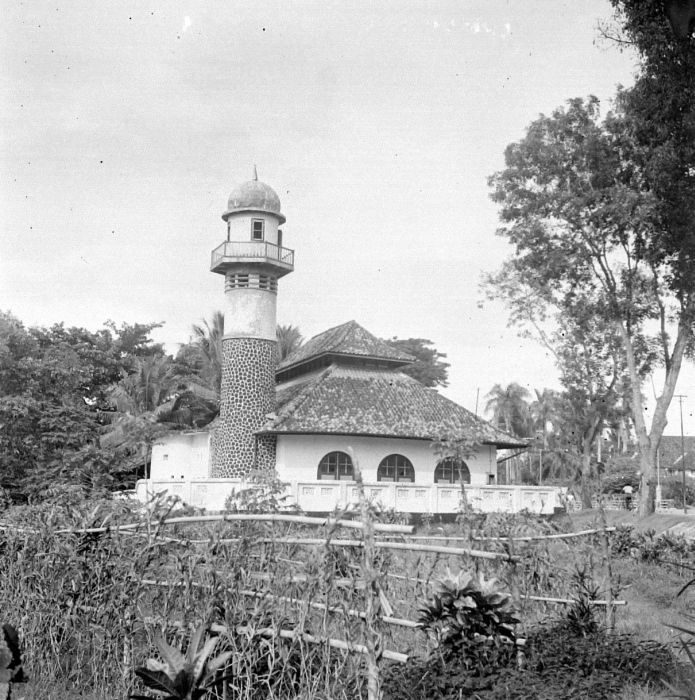

Religion
- Affiliation: Islam
- Branch/tradition: Sunni

Location
- Location: Cikini, Jakarta, Indonesia
- Interactive map of Al-Makmur Mosque
- Coordinates: 6.1912°S 106.8428°E

Architecture
- Type: Mosque

Masjid Jami' Al-Makmur Cikini is located on Jalan Raden Saleh Raya in Cikini, Central Jakarta, and is one of the oldest mosques in the locality. It was formerly known as Tjikini Mosque (Indonesian: 'Masjid Tjikini').

== Early history ==
The mosque stands on what was once the estate of Raden Saleh, the famous late nineteenth-century Romantic painter. Oral tradition has it that Raden Saleh himself allowed local Muslims to build a prayer house on his estate, sometime in 1850. In 1897, the late artist's wife sold the estate to the Alatas family, a prominent Peranakan Arab clan of colonial landlords and officials.

== Legal Limbo ==
Some thirty years later, Sayyid Ismail bin Sayyid Abdoellah bin Alwi Alatas sold part of the estate to Koningin Emma Stichting, a foundation that would later build and manage Cikini Hospital (Indonesian: 'Rumah Sakit Cikini'). The old mosque was excluded from the transaction due to an ongoing ownership dispute between the Sayyid and the mosque. Around this time, the simple old structure was moved to the banks of the Ciliwung to enable worshippers to undertake wudu in the river.

After Sayyid Ismail's victory in the courts, the land on which the mosque stood was sold to Koningin Emma Stichting in 1923. A year later, the hospital board officially requested the mosque board to move the house of worship further away from its present site.

== Staying power ==
The mosque authorities, however, refused since they consider the land a legacy, or waqf, left to the community by Raden Saleh.

To ensure the mosque's survival in situ, a committee was formed to transform the old simple prayer house into a permanent, concrete structure. Among the committee members were Agus Salim, Mas Mansur and Cokroaminoto. Between 1932 and 1934, the mosque underwent further renovation and expansion work, financed by Sarekat Islam. These efforts helped stave off efforts to have the mosque moved away, though the building remained in a legal limbo for many decades to come. It was only in 1991 that Cikini Hospital bequeathed - for good - to the mosque the land which it has occupied since 1850.

== See also ==
- List of mosques in Indonesia
- List of colonial buildings and structures in Jakarta

== Bibliography ==
- Heuken, S.J. Adolf (2003). Mesjid-mesjid tua di Jakarta. Yayasan Cipta Loka Caraka. ISBN 9799722926.
