= Daun di Atas Bantal =

- Daun di Atas Bantal
- Directed by: Garin Nugroho
- Written by: Garin Nugroho; Armantono
- Starring: Christine Hakim; Sugeng; Heru; Kancil; Kabri Wali; Deni Christanta; Sarah Azhari; Julie Estelle
- Cinematography: Nurhidayat
- Edited by: Sentot Sahid
- Music by: Djaduk Ferianto
- Release date: 14 August 1998
- Running time: 83 minutes
- Country: Indonesia
- Language: Indonesian

Daun di Atas Bantal (released in English as Leaf on a Pillow) is a 1998 Indonesian film directed by Garin Nugroho. It is one of the most acclaimed films from Indonesia in recent years and was the country's proposal for an Academy Award. It was also screened in the Un Certain Regard section at the 1998 Cannes Film Festival.

== Plot ==
The film follows three street children, Sugeng, Heru, and Kancil (played by themselves), in their day-to-day lives in Yogyakarta. Although they live in poverty, are from broken homes, and must do anything to survive, they aspire to rise above poverty and hope to receive an education. They are supported by Asih (Christine Hakim), a saleswoman who lets them stay in her workshop; the children fight over Asih's leaf pillow.

The children's lives do not go smoothly. Kancil is decapitated while playing on top of a train. Heru falls victim to an insurance scam, where he is given false identification papers and then killed to collect the premium.

== Production ==
Daun di Atas Bantal was produced by Hakim, who also played Asih. The film was her first production, and she initially did not intend to act in it to avoid stress; however, she changed her mind after being told the film would be more marketable in Japan if she acted in it. Hakim has called the film "an expensive university" for her because she made a mistake that required Nugroho to reshoot all of the footage. In an attempt to cut expenses, she had saved all cans of exposed film in an attempt to send them to the developing together; upon their receipt, the lab notified her that a technical fault with the camera had rendered the film unusable, and that it could have been detected earlier had she sent each can as it was filmed.

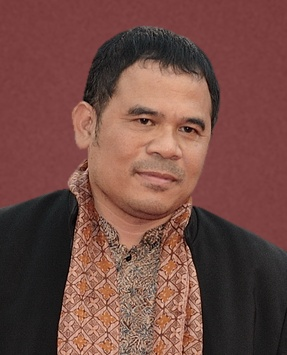
Garin Nugroho was chosen to direct based on his previous film Dongeng Kancil untuk Kemerdekaan.

Hakim chose Garin Nugroho to direct the film, noting that he was a "very talented young director", partly inspired by Nurgoho's 1995 documentary film on street children Dongeng Kancil untuk Kemerdekaan.

The street children in Daun di atas Bantal are actual street children, who portray "dramatized versions" of their own lives. After production, Hakim ensured that the children received an education; for example, Heru was placed in a music school.

The sound for Daun di Atas Bantal is Dolby Digital and was done in Australia. At the time, Dolby Digital sound was rare in Indonesian films.

== Style and themes ==
The film is based on true stories in the lives of three street boys in Yogyakarta who all die under tragic circumstances, and was played by the real street boys around the event location. The film also deals with poverty in Indonesia, as seen through the experiences of the poor.

According to Stephen Holden in a review for The New York Times, Daun di Atas Bantal is a "documentary-flavored" film that does not attempt to make the viewer care for the characters; he describes it as being detached and loosely structured. Ade Irwansyah of Tabloid Bintang notes that the plot is much more linear than Nugroho's earlier works, without confusing metaphors or poetic imagery.

== Release and reception ==
Daun di Atas Bantal was shown in the Un Certain Regard section at the 1998 Cannes Film Festival on 23 May 1998. It was Indonesia's submission to the 71st Academy Awards for Best Foreign Language Film, although it was not nominated.

Derek Elley, writing for Variety, called the movie Nugroho's best work to date, noting that although the opening was weak, "the viewer is slowly drawn into the urchins' nether world". Holden wrote that the film "hits you in the face with almost unimaginable squalor and a patchwork of teeming sights and sounds that are more than the senses can take in". In 2010, Ade Irwansyah of Tabloid Bintang listed Daun di Atas Bantal as the 17th-best Indonesian film of all time, noting that it was the first film in which Nugroho's dialogue was effective and the plot was easy to follow.

== Awards ==
- Asia-Pacific Film Festival – 1998 – Best Actress – Christine Hakim
- Asia-Pacific Film Festival – 1998 – Best Film
- Singapore International Film Festival – 1999 – Unggulan dalam kategori Silver Screen Award Best Asian Feature Film – Garin Nugroho
- Tokyo International Film Festival – 1998 – Special Jury Prize – Garin Nugroho

== See also ==
- List of submissions to the 71st Academy Awards for Best Foreign Language Film
- List of Indonesian submissions for the Academy Award for Best Foreign Language Film
