= Sarah Azhari =

Indonesian actress and singer

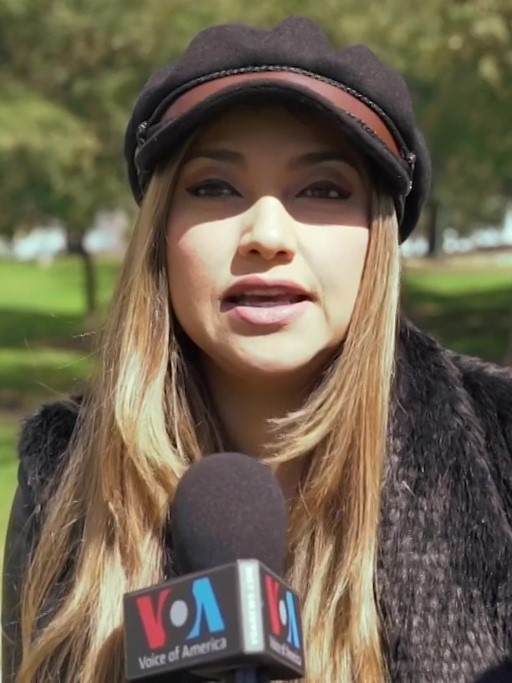
- Azhari in 2018
- Born: 16 June 1978 (age 48); Jakarta, Indonesia
- Occupations: Actress, singer
- Spouse: Pedro Miguel Carrascalão (m. 2000)
- Children: 1
- Family: Ayu Azhari (sister)

Sarah Azhari (born 16 June 1978) is an Indonesian actress, singer and television personality. She is the sister of Indonesian actress Ayu Azhari. Along actress Christine Hakim, she starred in a film directed by Garin Nugroho entitled Daun di Atas Bantal. Her modeling works sparked a wide measure of controversy in Indonesia. Detractors have denounced some of Azhari's photo shoots along with those of Sophia Latjuba as pornographic, though Azhari rejected the accusations and considers her work a form of art. She is often referred as the Indonesian most wanted actress of the 2000s.

== Biography ==
Azhari was born in Jakarta. Her older sister is Ayu Azhari, one of the most prominent figures of the figures of Cinema of Indonesia. Sarah gained popularity in the mid '90 teen soap opera shows, after Indonesian producer Raam Punjabi decided to cast her in his company Multivision Plus's productions such as "Senja Semakin Merah", "Maafkan Daku Mila Mencintaimu", "Masih Adak Waktu", and "Asmara". The shows were constantly airing on Indonesian television networks and were one of the major forms of entertainment among Indonesians teenage and adults. Her debut on the big screen occurred in 1998, when she appeared in Daun di Atas Bantal (Leaf on a Pillow), directed by Garin Nugroho, alongside actress Christine Hakim. The film became one of the most acclaimed films from Indonesia and was the country's entry for an Academy Award. It was also screened in the Un Certain Regard section at the 1998 Cannes Film Festival. In 1999, Azhari accepted Krisdayanti's offer and advice of signing with record label BMG Indonesia and she released her first album Peluk Aku Cium Aku, for which she was nominated for "Most Wanted Female Artist" and "Most Wanted Indonesian Video" at the MTV Southeast Asia awards. Azhari continued working as an actress, model and singer and television personality hosting shows such as live-comedy TV shows on TransTV and SCTV and was a host for 2006 MTV Music Awards.

== Personal life ==
She was married to Pedro Miguel Carrascalão and had a son named Albany Ray.

== Filmography ==
=== Television ===
- Damar Wulan
- Montir-Montir Cantik
- Lupus Millenia
- Masih Ada Waktu
- Asmara
- Istana Impian
- Maafkan Daku Bila Mencintaimu
- Senja Makin Merah

== Films ==
- Daun di Atas Bantal [Leaf on a Pillow] (1998)
- Mati Kemaren (2008)
- Suami-suami Takut Istri The Movie (2008)
- Hantu Cantik Kok Ngompol (2016)

== Discography ==
- Peluk Aku Cium Aku (1999)
- Sarah Azhari (album) (2009)
- Dance to Survive (2021)
- Near or Far (2022)
