= Aku Ingin Menciummu Sekali Saja =

2002 film

- Poster
- Directed by: Garin Nugroho
- Written by: Nana Mulyana, Garin Nugroho
- Produced by: Abduh Azis, M. Abduh Aziz, Garin Nugroho, Anastasia Rina
- Cinematography: Barly Juan Fibriady, Shamir
- Edited by: Fredy Aryanto, Puri Chrisanty, Arturo G.P., Andi Pulung Waluyo
- Music by: Fahmy Alattas
- Distributed by: C & T Productions, Prima Entertainment
- Release date: 14 February 2003
- Country: Indonesia
- Language: Indonesian

Aku Ingin Menciummu Sekali Saja (English: I Want To Kiss You Once) is a 2002 Indonesian crime drama film directed by Garin Nugroho.

== Cast ==
- Octavianus Rysiat Muabuay as Arnold
- Lulu Tobing as Kasih / The Crying Woman
- Minus Coneston Karoba as Minus
- Adi Kurdi as Pastur / Father
- Philipus Ramendei Thamo as Berthold
- Vivaldi Gorys Aronggear as Dickson
- Theys H. Eluay as himself
- Sylvia Roselani Samber as Mamma
