= Bulan Tertusuk Ilalang =

Bulan tertusuk ilalang
- Directed by: Garin Nugroho
- Cinematography: Nurhidayat
- Edited by: Arturo G. Pradjawisastra
- Distributed by: Film Workshop, PT. Genta Nusa Dwipantara
- Release date: 1995
- Running time: minutes
- Country: Indonesia
- Language: Indonesian

Bulan tertusuk ilalang is a 1995 award-winning Indonesian film directed by Garin Nugroho. Nugroho won the FIPRESCI Prize Forum of New Cinema at the Berlin International Film Festival in 1996.

== Cast ==
- Wiwiek Handawiyah as Retno
- Ratna Paquita as Bulan
- Norman Wibowo as Ilalang
- Bambang S. Jayantoro as Little Ilalang
- Pramana Padmodarmaya as Ilalang's father
- Sri Rahayu as Wulan
- Ki Sutarman as Waluyo
