= Dance to Survive =

"Dance To Survive"

Single by Sarah Azhari
- Released: July 16, 2021
- Recorded: 2021
- Studio: FB Studio (Hollywood)
- Genre: Dance-pop
- Label: GoatHead Records
- Songwriter(s): Beth Bella, Sarah Azhari, Frank Carrozzo
- Producer(s): Frank Carrozzo

"Dance To Survive" is a song by Indonesian singer and actress Sarah Azhari. "Dance To Survive" debuted as a single on July 16, 2021. "Dance To Survive" was written by Beth Bella, Frank Carrozzo and Sarah Azhari, and was produced by Frank Carrozzo. "Dance To Survive" adopted an upbeat dance-pop style and the lyrics describe the survival story of the artist to COVID-19.

After years of silence, Sarah's return was nationally and internationally unexpected, but the audiences reacted amazingly to her come back. Indonesian magazine Kompas states "The song was sung by Sarah Azhari to encourage people to face the COVID-19 pandemic situation with happiness and power". Voice of America conducted a special report with insights of how "Dance To Survive" became a summer hit.

The music video, directed by SOMEWHATANTi, released in November 2021 has Sarah Azhari performing in a desert, Los Angeles and includes video shots of people dancing around the world. Reviewers credited "Dance To Survive" for reviving Azhari's popularity and her position as a pop singer.
