= LA Indie Movie =

Indonesian filmmaking organisation

- Lingkar Alumni Indie Movie
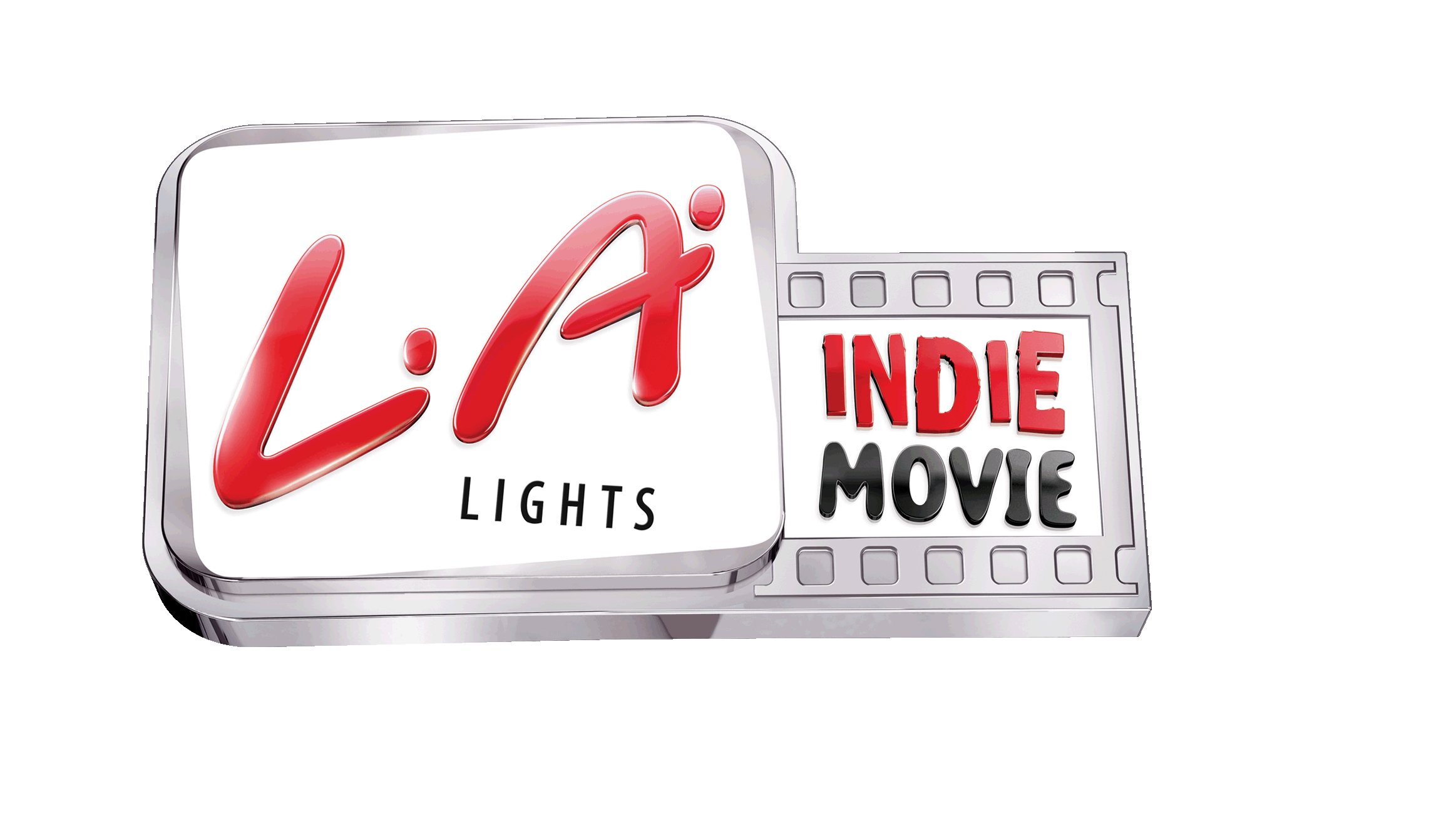
- Logo of the L.A. Lights Indie Movie, the organisation's former name
- Formation: 2007
- Founder: Garin Nugroho
- Purpose: Filmmaking
- Region served: Indonesia
- Official language: Indonesian
- Website: laindiemovie.lazone.id
- Formerly called: LA Lights Indie Movie

LA Indie Movie (LAIM) is an arts community focused on promoting indie filmmaking skills among younger Indonesians from development to screening. It is associated with the lifestyle website LA Zone and organises workshops, film festivals and film contests. LAIM was previously called LA Lights Indie Movie when sponsored by Djarum's LA Lights cigarettes. The organisation was founded in 2007. Since 2018, LAIM has also connected with the Lingkar Alumni Indie Movie talent troupe.

== Events ==
LA Indie Movie was started by Garin Nugroho in 2007 in association with his production company SET FILM. LAIM holds development, production and post-production programs split into two sections: Film Gue Cara Gue and Making a Film with Artists. Both pair participants, typically from Yogyakarta, Malang, Jakarta, or Surabaya, with veteran directors. The programs each produce four films during its duration; winners have the opportunity to participate in both domestic and international film festivals. Winning films are streamed on OTT, Iflix and Viddsee. MovieLAnd is a similar event consisting of workshops, selecting cast and crew and working with industry professionals. LAIM also holds a short story competition, wherein three stories are chosen to be directed and produced by established directors. The winning screenwriters go through a "script doctor program" with a veteran screenwriter and receive a cash prize of Rp 5,000,000.
