= Jakarta Planetarium and Observatory =

Jakarta Observatory
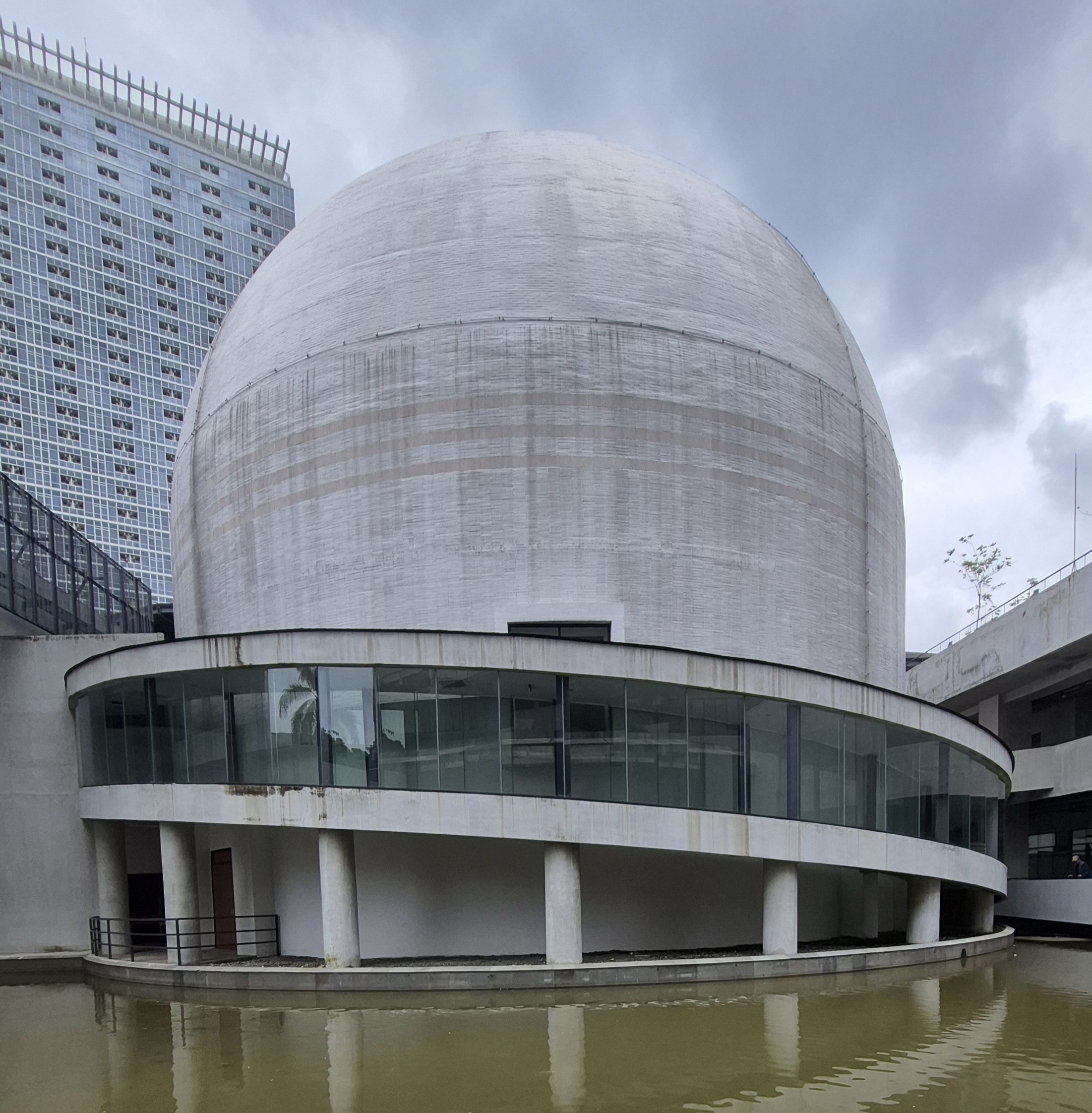
- Jakarta Planetarium and Observatory in 2025 (coordinates below is for the observatory)
- Location: Jakarta, Indonesia
- Coordinates: 6.189742°S 106.839431°E
- Altitude: 10 m
- Established: November 10, 1968
- Website: https://planetarium.jakarta.go.id/
- Related media on Commons

Jakarta Planetarium and Observatory (Indonesian: Planetarium dan Observatorium Jakarta) is a public planetarium and an observatory, part of the Taman Ismail Marzuki Art and Science Complex in Jakarta, Indonesia. The planetarium is the oldest of the three planetaria in Indonesia. The second planetarium is located in Surabaya, East Java. The third planetarium is located in Kutai, East Kalimantan.

== History ==
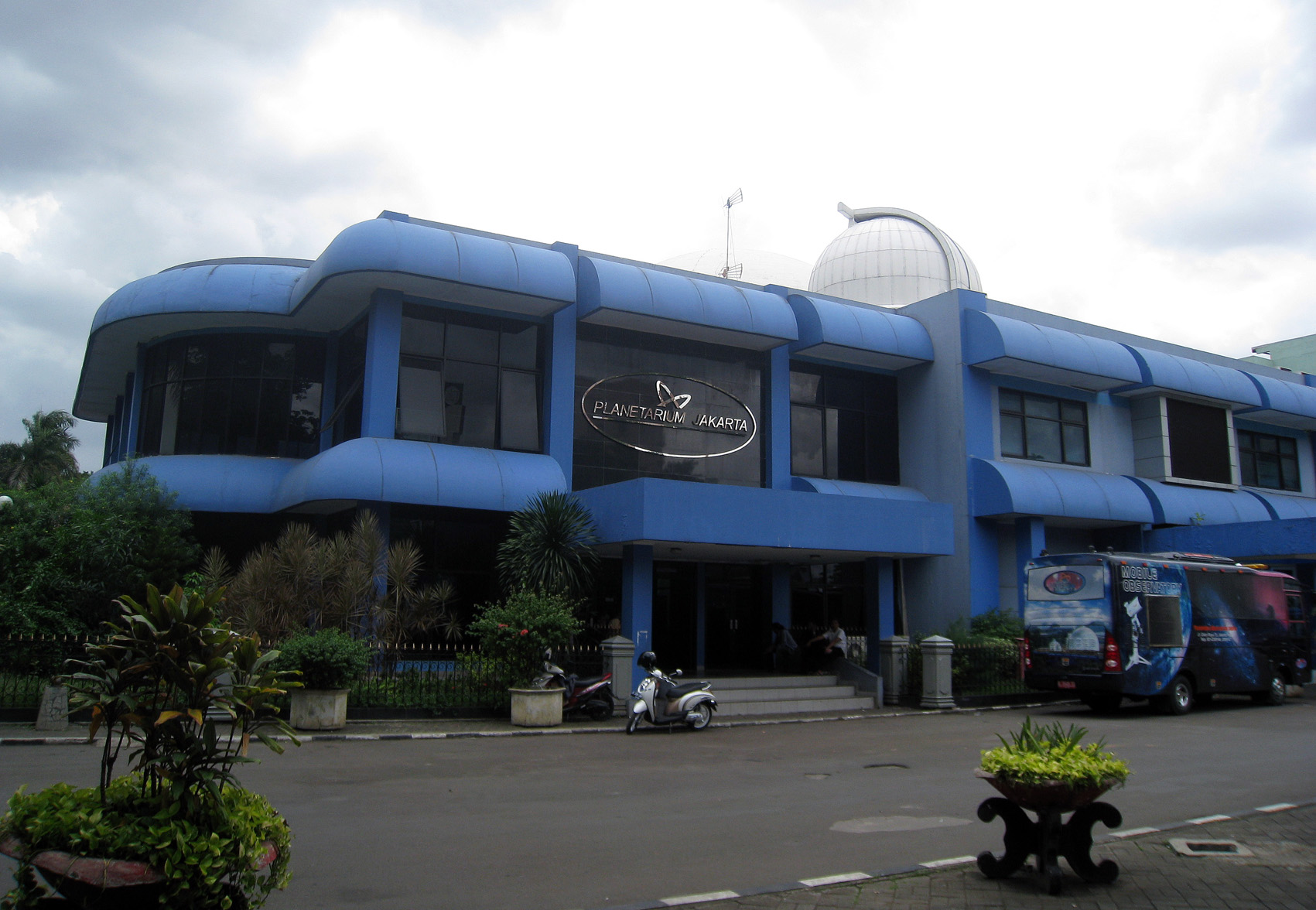
Outer view of the building, 2011

Construction of the planetarium was an initiative of President Sukarno when in the early 1960s he envisaged a monumental large-scale planetarium project. However, by the next half of the 1960s, the design was made more modest. The construction of the Jakarta Planetarium and Observatory began in 1964 as part of the construction of the Taman Ismail Marzuki art complex. The construction was funded by the Indonesian government and the Indonesian Batik Cooperatives Association (Gabungan Koperasi Batik Indonesia or GKBI).

The 22-meter dome of the planetarium was completed in 1968. On November 10, 1968, the building was officially inaugurated by the Governor of Jakarta Ali Sadikin together with the Taman Ismail Marzuki art complex. The planetarium was opened to the public on March 1, 1969; the day was made the official birthday of the planetarium. The planetarium made use of the Carl Zeiss Universal planetarium projector

In 1975, a coudé telescope that had already been a property of the institution since the 1964s was installed in a two-floored building not far from the planetarium. In 1982, the coudé telescope was moved closer to the present observatory because the land where the telescope stood earlier belonged to another owner.

In 1984, Jakarta Planetarium became officially the Jakarta Planetarium and Observatory. In 1991, the building was extended and facilities such as classrooms, were added. In 1994, a 31 cm star telescope was acquired to replace the older telescope.

Major renovation and technological upgrade of the planetarium was done in 1996. The previous Universal Projector was replaced with the computerized Universarium VIII Projector. The material for the domed screen was replaced and the diameter of the dome was reduced from 23 meters to 22 meters. The floor was elevated and terraced. The previous central-facing seating configuration was reorganized into a south-facing configuration, and the number of seats was reduced from 500 to 320.

In 2010, a Mobile Observatory unit was acquired: a minibus that transports several telescopes e.g. the LUNT 80 mm solar telescope, Vixen VC200 telescope, and a 120 mm refractor.

== Facility ==
The Jakarta Planetarium and Observatory features an exhibition hall for astronomy.

The planetarium features nine movies, each with a duration of 60 minutes.

== See also ==
- List of astronomical observatories
- List of planetariums
- List of museums and cultural institutions in Indonesia

== Cited works ==
- Merrillees, Scott (2015). Jakarta: Portraits of a Capital 1950-1980. Jakarta: Equinox Publishing. ISBN 9786028397308.
