= Armenian School (Madras) =

The Armenian School at Madras (now Chennai) was founded before 1820. There are no records which date the establishment or founder's name. In 1820 an Armenian merchant named George Manook bestowed Rs. 30,000 to the school, which closed in 1889 due to a lack of pupils. In 1912 it was decided to divert the income of the School to the Armenian College (Kolkata). In 1821, the Armenian College and Philanthropic Academy was started at Mirza Ghalib street.
