= Benjamin Galstaun =

Indonesian conservationist

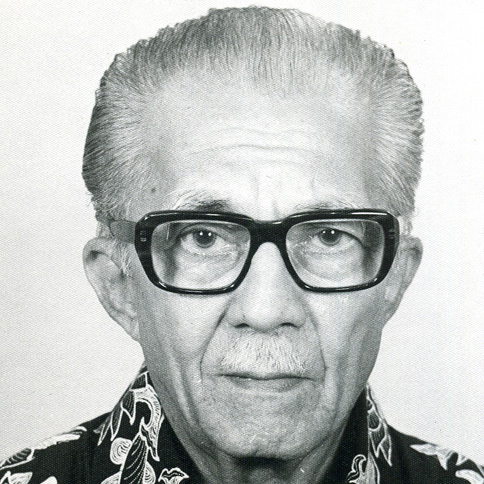
- Born: 30 April 1913; Klakah, East Java, Dutch East Indies
- Died: 3 April 1989 (Age 75); Jakarta, Indonesia
- Occupations: conservationist, biologist

Benjamin Galstaun (Klakah, 30 April 1913 – 3 April 1989) is an Indonesian conservation biologist. Since 1938, he has worked at a zoo which occupies an area of 10 hectares on land given to him by the painter Raden Saleh in the Cikini area, Jakarta. His wife is a landscape architect and botanist. Since 1964, Galstaun has served as director of the Cikini Zoo. When the zoo was moved to the Pasar Minggu area, South Jakarta, Galstaun, with the help of his wife, designed a zoo that was one with nature. In 1977, Galstaun received the Ramon Magsaysay Award for Government Service.

== Biography ==
=== Early life ===
Benjamin Galstaun was born in Klakah, East Java, on 30 April 1913. He was the youngest of seven children of Paulus Johanes Galstaun (Galstian), an Armenian, and Djainah Mariam Rahardjo, a Javanese. His Armenian father migrated from Isfahan, Persia (now Iran). His father owned a 3,500 hectare plantation planted with coffee, tobacco and pineapples.

=== Education ===
He attended primary school in Klakah and received his General Certificate of Education in 1930. After his primary schooling, he was sent to the Dutch high school in Surabaya, where he received his General Certificate of Education. On visits to Surabaya, his training in zoology and veterinary science was furthered by friends at the university, including three professors who allowed him to participate in autopsies. During his post-high school years, he lived and worked on the family plantation.

In late 1939, he decided to set out on his own, setting out in the private German trading firm of N.V. Carl Schlieper Handelsgesellschaft, where he first apprenticed in the sales department. The firm handled equipment for sugarcane factories and plantations growing coffee, cacao, tobacco, tapioca and other crops, and maintained good relations with customers by giving instruction on the use and care of machinery sold to them. Galstaun became one of those in the information department assigned to train both factory staff and laborers in classes and in the field.

=== World War II ===
On the eve of World War II, Galstaun became an artillery captain in the Dutch Home Guard. During the Japanese occupation, he was taken prisoner and sent to Kamioka, near Toyama on the west coast of Japan's Honshu Island, to undergo forced labor in a copper mine. When Japan lost the war, he was transferred to Okinawa and then Manila, Philippines. There, he spent nine months assisting the U.S. Prisoners of War Administration in the rehabilitation and repatriation of Australian, American, British and Dutch prisoners of war. In April 1946, he was returned to Jakarta.

=== Becoming director of Ragunan Zoo ===
In Jakarta, he met Henriette, the daughter of an industrial administrator in Cibadak. Both have the same interest in flora and fauna. They are also concerned about the fate of the zoo in Cikini, and its residents, which were damaged by the war. The zoo, which was originally called Planten-en Dierentuin (Plant and Zoo), was founded and managed by the Flora and Fauna Care Association which was part of the Vereniging Planten-en Dierentuin te Batavia in 1864. In order to restore the condition of the zoo, at the end of 1946, Galstaun accepted appointment as commissioner. Eight years later, he was appointed director of the Cikini Zoo, the name he had used since 1949.

The hardest task was to design and build a new zoo on 30 hectares of land donated by the DKI Jakarta Government. He sometimes gets annoyed and disappointed when the development process goes wrong. He reported mishandling and corruption to Jakarta Governor Ali Sadikin. In September 1964, Galstaun oversaw the exodus of more than 450 mammals, reptiles and birds to a new location which was named Taman Wildlife Park but better known as Ragunan Zoo. Governor Ali Sadikin inaugurated it in 1966.

== Personal life ==
He married Henriette Esche, who is a landscape architect, botanist, and zoologist. They married on 14 January 1947.

Benjamin Galstaun died on 3 April 1989. As a tribute to his services, a bust of him stands tall in the middle of the Ragunan Zoo.
