= Armenia–Indonesia relations =

- Armenia: Indonesia

Diplomatic mission
- Armenian Embassy, Jakarta: Indonesian Embassy in Kyiv

Armenia–Indonesia relations refer to foreign relations between Armenia and Indonesia. Both nations are members of the Asian Development Bank, the World Trade Organization and the United Nations.

== History ==
On 22 September 1992, diplomatic ties were established between Indonesia and Armenia. Despite this, Indonesia backs Azerbaijan's stance on the Nagorno-Karabakh dispute in international fora.

The two nations established a bilateral advisory forum and signed a double taxation avoidance agreement on 12 October 2005. The two nations signed a deal on economic, scientific, and technological cooperation on August 8, 2012. An agreement to cooperate in the areas of education and higher education was signed by the two nations on 1 November 2016.

In honor of the 25th anniversary of the establishment of diplomatic ties between Armenia and Indonesia, Minister of Foreign Affairs of Armenia Edward Nalbandian and Minister of Foreign Affairs of Indonesia Retno Marsudi exchanged letters on 16 September 2017. According to Nalbandian, a solid basis for the growth of interstate relations and the encouragement of amicable connections between the two peoples has been established over the course of the last 25 years. Minister Marsudi stated that she is confident that the 25th anniversary of the start of diplomatic relations would provide a fresh boost to deepen the friendship and collaboration between the two nations.

President Joko Widodo of Indonesia declared on 13 January 2020, in an Abu Dhabi bilateral meeting with President Armen Sarkissian of Armenia, that the two nations' long-standing historical ties between them should be fostered into a bilateral mutual partnership. He also prioritized increased cooperation between Armenia and Indonesia in the field of information technology (IT).

On 22 September 2022, the foreign ministers of Armenia and the Republic of Indonesia exchanged messages commemorating the 30th anniversary of the two countries' diplomatic relations' establishment. Ararat Mirzoyan, the foreign minister of Armenia, placed emphasis on the growth of cooperative relationships on both bilateral and multilateral forums. He expressed optimism that with concerted efforts, Armenian-Indonesian cooperation can reach new heights. The Indonesian side values collaboration within the parameters of the free trade agreement that Indonesia and the EAEU would eventually finalize, as well as tighter connections in the areas of trade and information technology.

The President of Armenia, Vahagn Khachaturyan, received a Letter of Credence from President Joko Widodo from the Indonesian Ambassador to Ukraine, Arief Basalamah, at the Presidential Palace in Yerevan on 15 November 2023. The Armenian president seeks to strengthen Indonesian-Armenian economic cooperation. The Indonesian ambassador also reaffirmed his commitment to promoting increased investment and trade. One way he plans to do this is by hosting regular business forums in Indonesia, such as the Indonesia - Europe Business Forum and Trade Expo Indonesia, which are yearly events that aim to investigate trade and investment prospects between the two nations and involve Armenian businesspeople.

In April 2025, Hakob Arshakyan, the vice president of the Armenian National Assembly, met with Ravindra Airlangga, an Indonesian lawmaker who was part of the country's delegation to the 150th IPU Assembly in Uzbekistan. Arshakyan praised the continued collaboration since diplomatic relations were established and emphasized the importance of maintaining a high degree of political communication, including through reciprocal visits between the two nations. Ongoing significant initiatives to broaden legislative collaboration in the political, economic, scientific, and other domains were emphasized by both parties.

== Trade ==
In 2018, trade between the two countries amounted to about $27 million.

Armenia exported $891 thousand to Indonesia in 2021. Ferroalloys ($41.2 thousand), Pure Olive Oil ($23.4 thousand), and Other Edible Preparations ($773 thousand) are Armenia's top exports to Indonesia. Armenian exports to Indonesia have grown at a yearly rate of 9.67% during the past 24 years, from $97.1 thousand in 1997 to $891 thousand in 2021.

Indonesia exported $18.9 million to Armenia in 2021. Coffee ($10.9 million), raw plastic sheeting ($1.51 million), and stone processing machines ($1.49 million) were Indonesia's top exports to Armenia. Indonesian exports to Armenia have grown at an annualized rate of 21.5% over the past 24 years, from $175 thousand in 1997 to $18.9 million in 2021.

During Innoprom 2026, Armenian Minister of Economy Gevorg Papoyan and Indonesian Minister of Industry Agus Gumiwang Kartasasmita discussed enhancing trade, economic, and business cooperation between Armenia and Indonesia, focusing on industrial development and technology exchange. Kartasasmita noted that total trade between the two countries reached US$26.7 million in 2025, reflecting significant annual growth.

== Diplomatic missions ==
- Armenia maintains an embassy in Jakarta.
- Indonesia has no diplomatic presence in Armenia. Instead, its embassy in Kyiv is accredited to Armenia. Nonetheless, Indonesia maintains an honorary consulate in Yerevan. However, as the two countries look for ways to improve their bilateral ties, Armenia has pushed Indonesia to open an embassy in Yerevan.

== See also ==
- Foreign relations of Armenia
- Foreign relations of Indonesia
- Armenians in Indonesia
