= Ismail Marzuki Park =

Art center in Jakarta, Indonesia

Ismail Marzuki Park Jakarta Arts Center
- Pusat Kesenian Jakarta Taman Ismail Marzuki
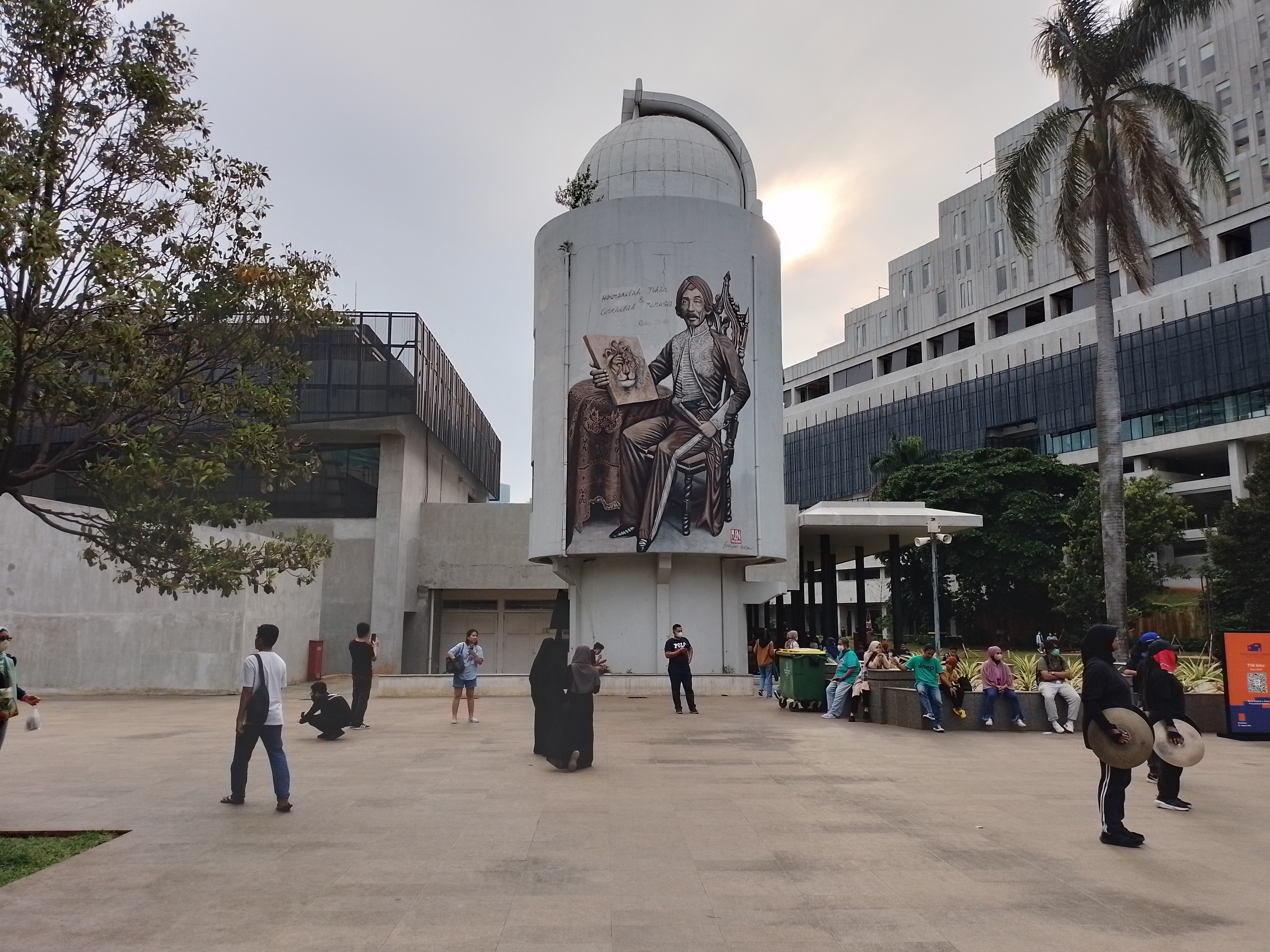
- The park's plaza at the backyard of the Jakarta Planetarium and Observatory with a mural depicting Raden Saleh
- Interactive map of Ismail Marzuki Park Jakarta Arts Center
- Type: Arts and science park
- Location: Jalan Cikini Raya, Cikini, Jakarta, Indonesia
- Coordinates: 6°11′21″S 106°50′24″E
- Created: 10 November 1968; 58 years ago
- Operator: PT Jakarta Propertindo (Perseroda)
- Public transit: Transjakarta City Bus: 5M, 6H Taman Ismail Marzuki; Mikrotrans Jaklingko: JAK-10A Taman Ismail Marzuki; KRL Commuterline: Cikini station
- Facilities: Jakarta Public Library; Jakarta Planetarium and Observatory; Jakarta Institute of Arts

The Ali Sadikin Building (Gedung Ali Sadikin) or the "Long Building" (Gedung Panjang) is the new facility on the Ismail Marzuki Park after its revitalization from 2019–2022.

Ismail Marzuki Park Jakarta Arts Center (Indonesian: Pusat Kesenian Jakarta Taman Ismail Marzuki, TIM), is an arts, cultural, and science center located at Cikini in Jakarta, Indonesia. Taman Ismail Marzuki complex comprises several facilities including six performing arts theaters, cinemas, an exhibition hall, a gallery, libraries, and an archive building. The complex is built on a 9-hectare land area, which was previously a zoo (which was in turn relocated to Ragunan). TIM is named after Ismail Marzuki, one of Indonesia's most influential composers.

The goal of building the complex was to use it as a hub for fine and performing arts, a window into Indonesia's diverse and rich culture. The complex was previously known as Jakarta Arts Center. Management of TIM was handed to the Jakarta Arts Council, while operations are funded by rental fees for the facilities and subsidies from the Jakarta city administration.

== History ==
Inaugurated by Jakarta Governor Ali Sadikin, on 10 November 1968, the 90-meter square cultural center was built on the former Taman Raden Saleh, a public park established and owned by Raden Saleh, who was a famous Indonesian painter during the colonial era. Taman Raden Saleh was previously Jakarta's zoo and a public park before being moved to Ragunan Zoo. Taman Raden Saleh previously hosted a Greyhound racing arena, a cinema, a Garden Hall, and a podium.

The Jakarta administration has undertaken a revitalization project which would be conducted in stages for TIM with an estimated cost of US$125 million and is expected to be completed by 2021. The revitalization includes improving the interiors and other facilities of TIM, including the planetarium, as well as constructing a library and a mosque to replace the existing ones. A new movie theater is to be built to replace the Cinema XXI movie theater that shut down.

== Jakarta Arts Council ==
Jakarta Arts Council (Indonesian: Dewan Kesenian Jakarta -DKJ) was founded by Indonesian artists and was officially founded by The Governor of Jakarta, Ali Sadikin, on June 17, 1969. The responsibility and functions of the Jakarta Arts Council are to build partnerships with the Governor of Jakarta and formulate policies for supporting the activities and development of the arts in the capital region.

During the early stages, the members of the Jakarta Arts Council were appointed by the Academy of Jakarta, consisting of intellectuals and people of the culture and arts of Indonesia. As time progresses the selection process is conducted transparently through a team of art scholars and experts, both from within and outside the Academy of Jakarta. They receive the candidates from the public and respected arts groups for 3 3-year period term. The arts development is carried out through annual programs from each committee. DKJ consists of 25 members and is divided into 6 committees: Film, Music, Literature, Fine Arts, Dance, and Drama.

== Infrastructure and facilities in the complex ==
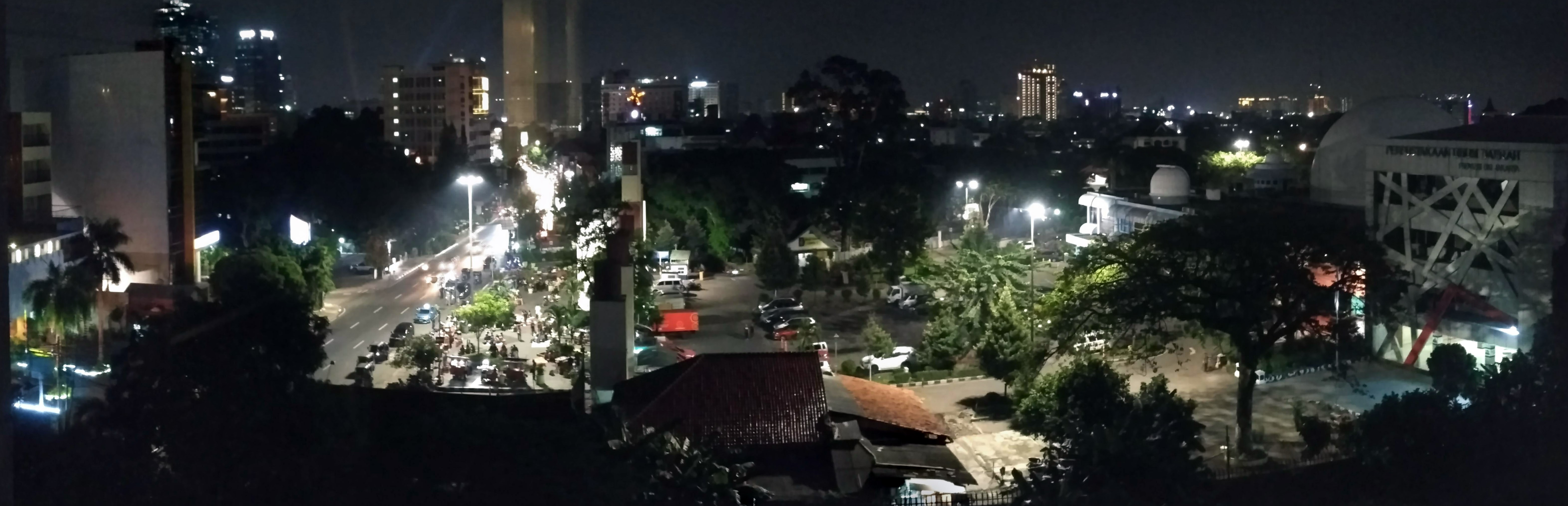
Panoramic view of the park in 2018

Within the complex, there are also educational institutions such as the Jakarta Art Institute (IKJ), the HB Jassin Literary Documentation Center, and the Jakarta Planetarium. There is also a large food court within the complex. Cultural performances often take place in this cultural center, including dance, drama, and music performances, poetry reading, sculpture, painting and art exhibitions, and film festival screenings.

- Graha Bhakti Budaya is a performing art hall with an 800-seat capacity, 600 on the ground floor and 200 on the balcony. The stage measures 15m x 10m x 6m. This air-conditioned hall is equipped with lighting, acoustic technology, and sound systems; and stages musical concerts, performing arts such as drama, traditional or contemporary dances, and also film screenings.
- Galeri Cipta I, II, and III, are galleries housing fine arts, paintings and sculpture exhibitions, art discussions, seminars, and short film screenings. These galleries can contain 80 paintings and 20 sculptures.
- Teater Jakarta is a performing art studio that has two theaters, the larger one with a capacity of 1200 and the smaller one with a capacity of 300 spectators. Theater, music, poetry, and seminars are staged here. The stage measures 10m x 5m x 6m. The building is equipped with acoustic and lighting systems and is air-conditioned.
- Kineforum is a 45-person capacity theater run by the Jakarta Arts Council.
- Teater Halaman or Studio Pertunjukan Seni is an open-air auditorium for experimental art for young artist's theater and poetry performances.
- Plaza: the courtyard of TIM is sometimes used as additional space to stage outdoor performing that can accommodate 2,500 spectators.
- Jakarta Arts Institute (IKJ), HB Jassin Literary Documentation Center, and Jakarta Planetarium also located within the complex.
- Jakarta Public Library (Perpustakaan Jakarta), located on the 4th, 5th, and 6th floor of the Ali Sadikin Building is the new facility of TIM. This library is in the same location as the HB Jassin Center for Literary Documents (Pusat Dokmen Sastra or PDS). Apart from being a library, there are additional facilities such as indoor and outdoor playrooms. An indoor playroom is provided for children. Other facilities of this library are stair shelves for reading, in addition to bookshelves. The manager also provides booths for visitors who need privacy to read or work. The booths can be filled by two people.

== Cited works ==
- Merrillees, Scott (2015). Jakarta: Portraits of a Capital 1950-1980. Jakarta: Equinox Publishing. ISBN 9786028397308.
