= Ragunan Zoo =

Ragunan Zoological Park
- Taman Margasatwa Ragunan
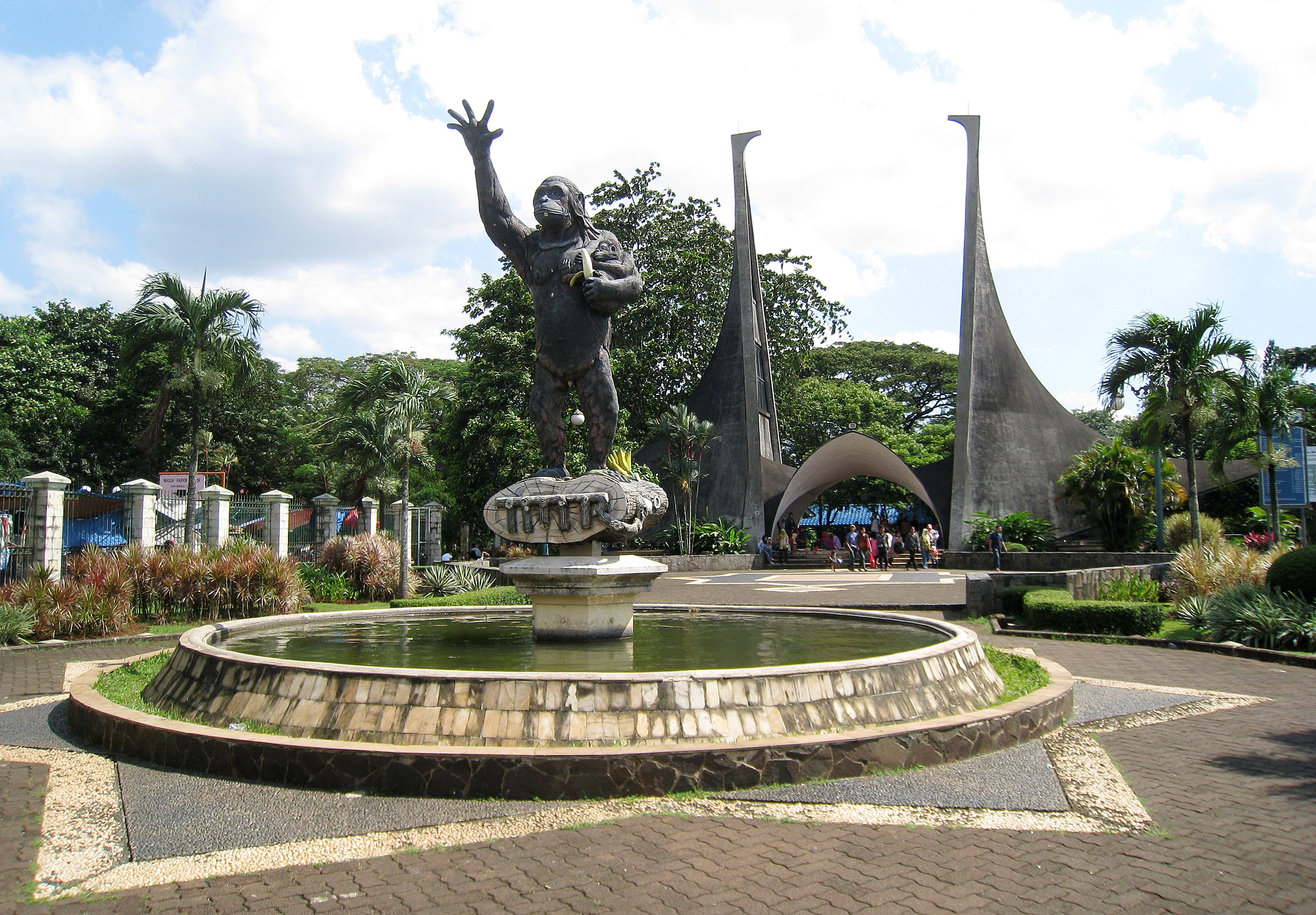
- Front gate of the Ragunan Zoo
- Interactive map of Ragunan Zoological Park
- 6.3115875°S 106.8199182°E
- Date opened: 1864 (original); 22 June 1966 (current location)
- Location: Ragunan, Pasar Minggu, South Jakarta, Jakarta, Indonesia
- Land area: 140 ha (350 acres)
- No. of animals: 2,288
- No. of species: 335
- Memberships: WAZA
- Public transit: Ragunan
- Website: Official website

Ragunan Zoological Park (Indonesian: Taman Margasatwa Ragunan), formerly and still commonly known as Ragunan Zoo (Indonesian: Kebun Binatang Ragunan), is a zoo and urban park located in the eponymous kelurahan (subdistrict) in Pasar Minggu, South Jakarta, Jakarta, Indonesia. The area covers 140-hectare (350-acre) which makes it the largest park in Jakarta. The zoo has an aviary and a primate centre, and employs over 450 people. Many of the animals in here are endangered and threatened from all parts of Indonesia and the rest of the world. There are a total of 2,288 animals inside the zoo. Laid out in a lush tropical habitat, rare animals such as crocodile, chimpanzee, gorilla, orangutan, tapir, anoa, sumatran tiger, babirusa, and peacocks are given ample room. The zoo is located in South Jakarta and is easily accessible through the Jakarta Outer Ring Road and Transjakarta Corridor 6 bus (green color).

Ragunan Zoo originally opened in 1864 in the area subsequently redeveloped as the Ismail Marzuki Park. Therefore, the zoo is 162 years old. It is the oldest zoo in Indonesia.

== History ==
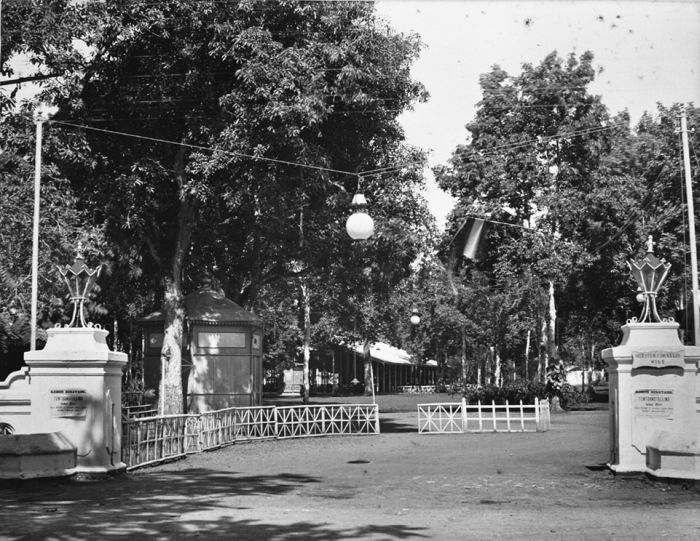
The first zoo of Batavia (Jakarta) located in the Cikini area

The zoo was established in 1864 by a Dutch East Indies flora and fauna lovers organization, the Vereneging Planten en Dierentuin of Batavia. Raden Saleh, a prominent Indonesian painter in the 19th century, donated about 10 hectares (25 acres) of his land for the establishment of Batavia’s first zoo in the Cikini area of Central Jakarta. The zoo moved to its present location in 1966, and was officially opened on 22 June, managed by the city administration. The former location was turned into the Taman Ismail Marzuki Performing Art Center and Jakarta Institute of Arts.

Ragunan Zoo used to keep a pair of Sumatran rhinoceros, named Jalu and Dusun, from 1986 to the late 1990s. The male Jalu was a wild rhinoceros caught from Sumatra, while the female Dusun came from Malacca Zoo. Jalu died at the zoo in 1994, Dusun was sent to the Way Kambas National Park and died there in 2001.

In July 2002, four western lowland gorilla arrived from Howletts Wild Animal Park, the four male gorillas are: Kumbo, Komu, Kihi, and Kidjoum. Kidjoum died in February 2008 following a fight with the other gorillas. The three remaining gorillas are now the zoo's main attractions, housed in the Schmutzer Primate Center.

On 19 September 2005, following the order of the city's governor, the zoo was temporarily closed for about three weeks after various birds were found to have been infected by avian influenza.

On January 1, 2015, Ragunan Zoo was visited by 186,456 visitors, the highest among the New Year days, the previous highest record was about 175,000 visitors on January 1, 2011.

In 2015, the Head of the General Service Division of Ragunan Zoo said that in 2018, Ragunan Zoo is predicted to become an international standard for zoos, with the hiring of experts to improve the welfare and life quality of the animals, improving the quality of the cages, and improving facilities for visitors. Later that year, the zoo received 209 billion rupiah for subsidy from the local government.

As of April 2021, there are 2,288 animals and 335 animal species inside the zoo.

== The Schmutzer Primate Centre ==
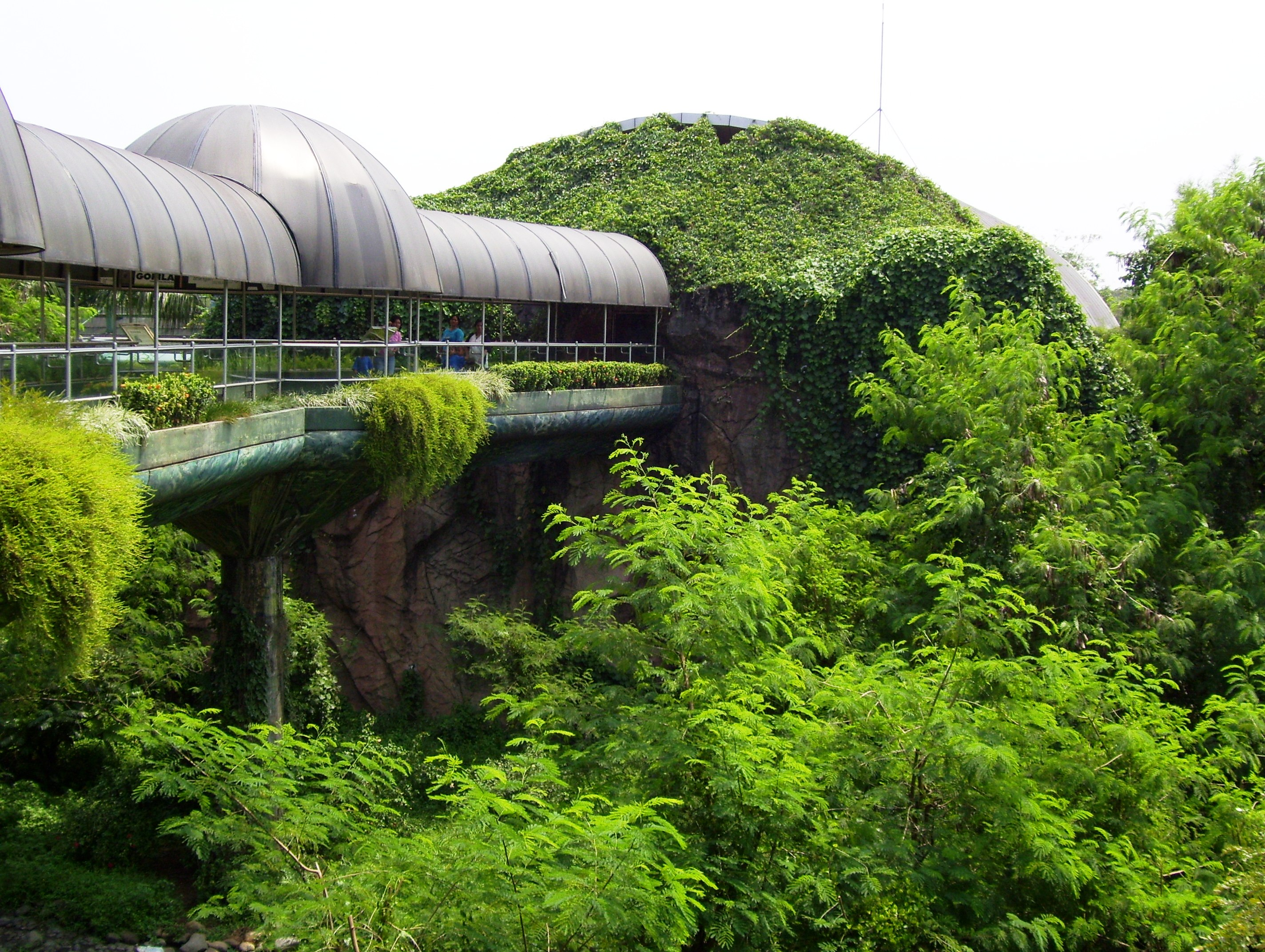
The Schmutzer Primate Centre, featuring many types of primates

The Schmutzer Primate Centre was opened in 2002, within the Ragunan Zoo but privately funded and managed separately. It is one of the largest of such centers in the world. The 13-hectare (32-acre) special enclosure houses various primates, including gorillas, chimpanzees and orangutans. The center was named after Pauline Antoinette Schmutzer, who donated her estate to the center. Willie Smits of the Borneo Orangutan Survival Foundation designed the orangutan enclosure so that the orangutans have as natural an environment as possible. Thick dark glass allows visitors to see the orangutans while being invisible to them.

== Exhibits ==
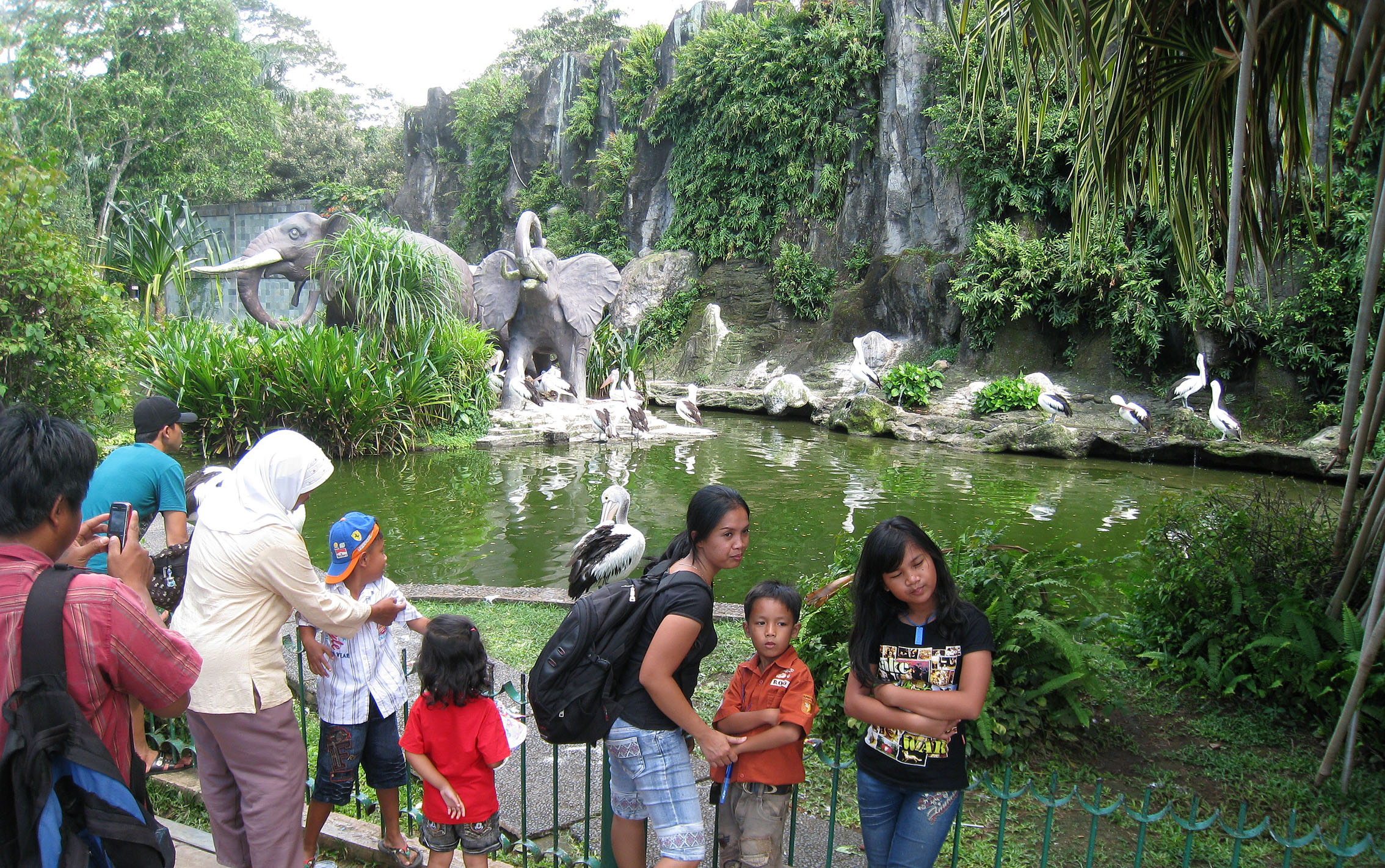
The Ragunan Zoo is a popular weekend destination for Jakarta families

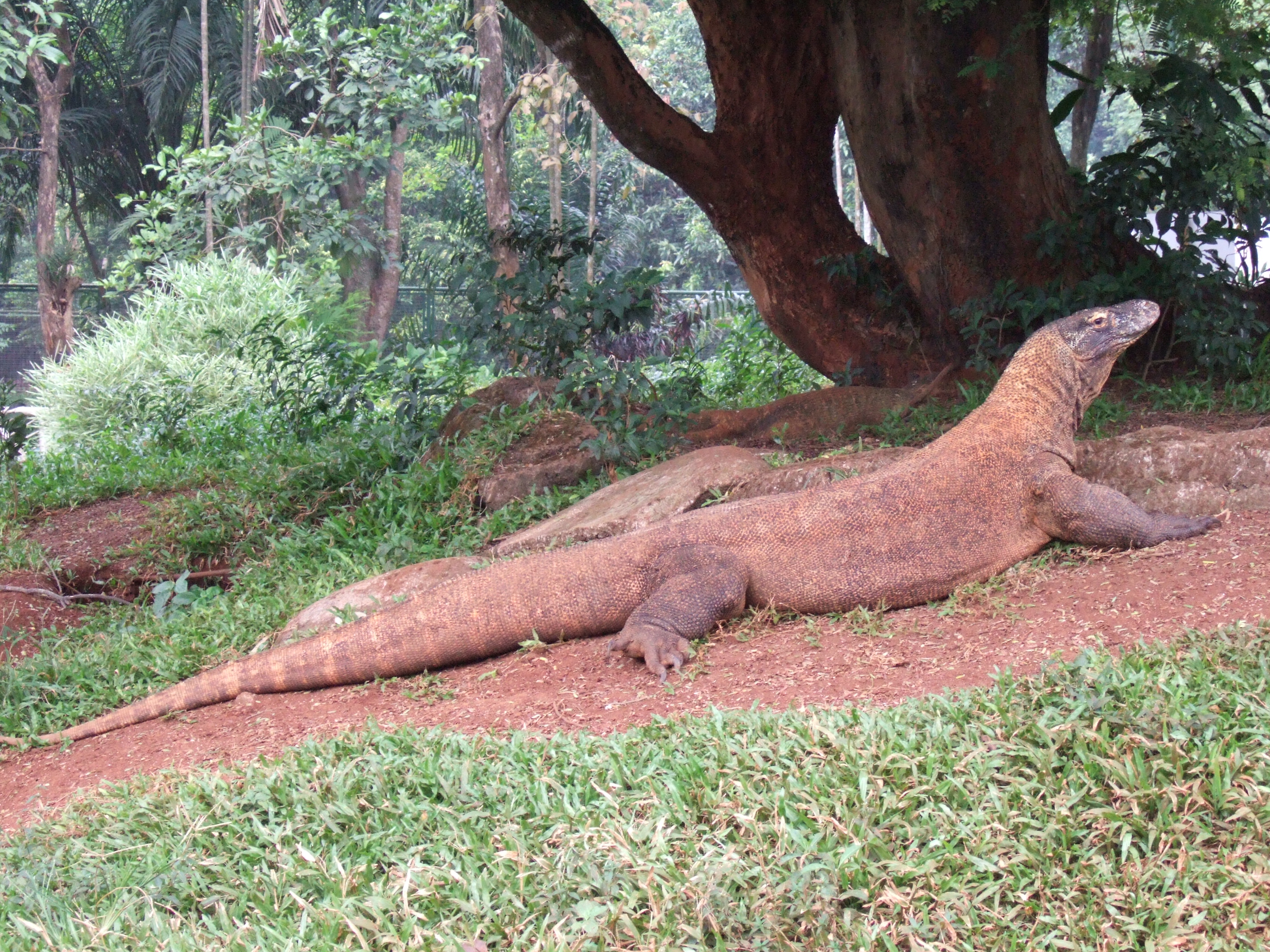
Komodo dragon in Ragunan Zoo

Several primate cages house various species of langurs, gibbons, and macaques, while the gorillas, chimpanzees, and orangutans are located in the Schmutzer Primate Centre. Small mammal compounds display binturongs, civets, porcupines, and others. Ragunan also displays large cats like leopards and tigers. The cages for tigers, bears, and lions are located on the southeastern end of the zoo.

A pool with pelicans is located near the entrance. Several aviaries host the zoo's bird collection, including peafowls, eagles, mynas, hornbills, cockatoos, crowned pigeons and pheasants. Large birds like cassowary and ostrich are displayed in separate compounds.

== Species ==
=== Mammals ===
- East Javan langur
- Silvery langur
- Javan surili
- Natuna Island surili
- Siamang
- Bornean orangutan
- Capybara
- Javan muntjac
- Chital
- Javan rusa deer
- Sri Lankan leopard
- Jaguar
- Pygmy hippopotamus
- Sumatran elephant
- Reticulated giraffe
- Javan banteng
- Nilgai
- Binturong
- Bengal tiger
- Lion
- Common eland
- Anoa
- Hippopotamus
- Porcupine
- Sun bear

=== Birds ===
- Java sparrow
- Bali myna
- Eastern hill myna
- Spotted dove
- Western crowned pigeon
- Sclater's crowned pigeon
- Victoria crowned pigeon
- Grey parrot
- Eclectus parrot
- Moustached parakeet
- Galah
- Citron-crested cockatoo
- Triton cockatoo
- Palm cockatoo
- Red-and-green macaw
- Large-billed crow
- Buffy fish owl
- Barred eagle-owl
- Brahminy kite
- Crested serpent eagle
- Grey-headed fish eagle
- White-bellied sea eagle
- Black hornbill
- Oriental pied hornbill
- Wreathed hornbill
- Maleo
- Lady Amherst's pheasant
- Silver pheasant
- Java peafowl
- Indian peafowl
- Australian pelican
- Javan pond heron
- Grey heron
- Grey crowned crane
- Lesser flamingo
- Greater flamingo
- Lesser adjutant
- South African ostrich

=== Reptile ===
- Gold-ringed cat snake
- King cobra
- Komodo dragon
- Burmese python
- Reticulated python
- Two-striped water monitor
- False gharial
- New Guinea crocodile
- Saltwater crocodile
- Crocodile monitor

=== Fish ===
- Tinfoil barb
- Red-bellied piranha
- Clown featherback
- Iridescent shark
- Giant snakehead
- Asian arowana
- Alligator gar

== Other attractions ==
Special attractions for the children include a Children's Zoo, playground and rides, along with the Sunday events of pony cart and boat rides on Ragunan lake.
