= Garin Nugroho =

Indonesian film director

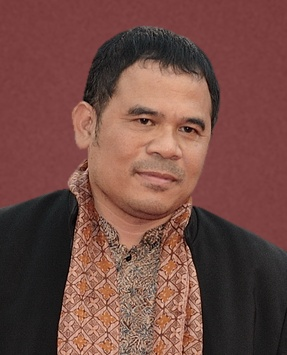
- Born: Garin Nugroho Riyanto; 6 June 1961 (age 65); Yogyakarta, Special Region of Yogyakarta
- Occupations: Film director; producer; screenwriter
- Years active: 1984–present
- Children: Kamila Andini
- Relatives: Ifa Isfansyah (son in-law)

Garin Nugroho Riyanto (born 6 June 1961) is an Indonesian filmmaker.

== Biography ==
Nugroho was born in Yogyakarta, Special Region of Yogyakarta on 6 June 1961. He was the fourth child of postal workers Soetjipto Amin and Mariah, who eventually had seven children. As a child, he attended an Islamic elementary school, later attending Catholic secondary schools. His father owned a lending library and enjoyed writing, leading Nugroho to start writing from a young age; he later quit writing because he felt his father to be too critical. He also enjoyed exploring, and would bathe in the Code River fed by the cold lahar runoffs from Mount Merapi; he notes that the sulfur, which was brought to the river by the lava, was good for his skin.

After graduating from Kolese Loyola high school in 1981, Nugroho went to Jakarta to study filmmaking at the Jakarta Institute of Arts (Institut Kesenian Jakarta, or IKJ), as well as law and politics at the University of Indonesia (UI). After studying under Teguh Karya, he graduated from the IKJ in 1985. He later graduated from UI in 1991. During his free time, Nugroho directed documentaries and short movies.

Nugroho made his directorial debut with 1991's Cinta dalam Sepotong Roti (Love in a Slice of Bread), overcoming bureaucracy caused by his refusal to join the Indonesian filmmakers' union. Cinta dalam Sepontong Roti was selected as Best Film in that year's Indonesian Film Festival.

After his mother's death in 2005, Nugroho decided to make a film about Javanese culture. He was later commissioned by the government of Austria to make a film for the 250th anniversary of Mozart's birth. The result, Opera Jawa, was based on the Ramayana and produced by Simon Fields. In 2007, he founded LA Indie Movie.

In 2008 Nugroho returned to theatre with The Iron Bed, adapted from Opera Jawa. The play was shown at the Zürcher Theater Spektakel in Zurich, Switzerland.

== Style ==
The Jakarta Post writes that Nugroho's films emphasize aesthetics, but contain sociopolitical messages. Among the issues he has discussed in his films are multiculturalism, politics, intercultural communication, and his vision for a "New Indonesia". However, he has faced criticism that his films are too difficult for the general public to understand; Seno Gumira Ajidarma credits this to Nugroho's narrative style, which comes across as strange to Indonesian viewers.

Joko Anwar, writing for The Jakarta Post, notes that dialogue written by Nugroho tends to lack believability. Sylviana Hamdani of The Jakarta Globe describes his dialogue as poetic. Nugroho also mixes historical footage with staged scenes in several of his movies, including Surat Untuk Bidadari and Aku Ingin Menciummu Sekali Saja.

== Recognition ==
Nugroho's debut film Cinta dalam Sepotong Roti garnered six Citra award nominations (Best Director, Best Movie, Best Editing, Best Music, Best Artistic Scenes and Best Cinematography) at the Indonesian Film Festival (IFF); Nugroho was selected as the Best Young Director at the Asia Pacific Film Festival in Seoul the next year. His next movie, Surat untuk Bidadari (Letter for an Angel), won Best Film at the Taormina Film Festival as well as the Tokyo International Film Festival, while Nugroho himself received Best Director at the Pyongyang International Film Festival and Young Filmmakers Jury award at the Berlin International Film Festival.

His film Daun di Atas Bantal (Leaf on a Pillow) also won Tokyo International Film Festival, in 1998.

== Personal life ==
Nugroho enjoys gardening and travelling, both in Indonesia and abroad.

== Filmography ==
- 1984: Gerbong Satu, Dua (Wagon 1, 2)
- 1989: Tepuk Tangan
- 1991: Cinta Dalam Sepotong Roti (Love in a Slice of Bread)
- 1991: Air dan Romi (Water and Romi)
- 1994: Surat untuk Bidadari (Letter to an Angel)
- 1995: Dongeng Kancil untuk Kemerdekaan (Kancil's Tale of Freedom)
- 1995: Bulan Tertusuk Ilalang (...and the Moon Dances)
- 1998: My Family, My Films and My Nation
- 1998: Daun di Atas Bantal (Leaf on a Pillow)
- 2000: Puisi Tak Terkuburkan (A Poet)
- 2001: Layar hidup: Tanjung priok/Jakarta (Waterfront)
- 2002: Rembulan di Ujung Dahan (TV)
- 2002: Aku Ingin Menciummu Sekali Saja (Bird Man Tale)
- 2004: Rindu Kami Padamu (Of Love and Eggs)
- 2006: Serambi
- 2006: Opera Jawa (Requiem from Java)
- 2008: Di Bawah Pohon (Under the Tree)
- 2009: Generasi Biru (The Blue Generation)
- 2012: Soegija
- 2016: Setan Jawa
- 2018: Memories of My Body
- 2022: Deadly Love Poetry (Puisi Cinta yang Membunuh)
- 2024: Samsara
- 2025: Siapa Dia
- 2026: Red Before Dawn

== Awards and nominations ==
Year	Award	Category	Recipients	Result
1991	Indonesian Film Festival	Citra Award for Best Director	Cinta dalam Sepotong Roti	Nominated
2008	Indonesian Film Festival	Citra Award for Best Director	Under the Tree	Nominated
2019	Indonesian Film Festival	Citra Award for Best Director	Kucumbu Tubuh Indahku	Won
2025	Asia Pacific Screen Awards	Best Director	Samsara	Pending
