= Kancil's Tale of Freedom =

1995 film

Dongeng Kancil untuk Kemerdekaan
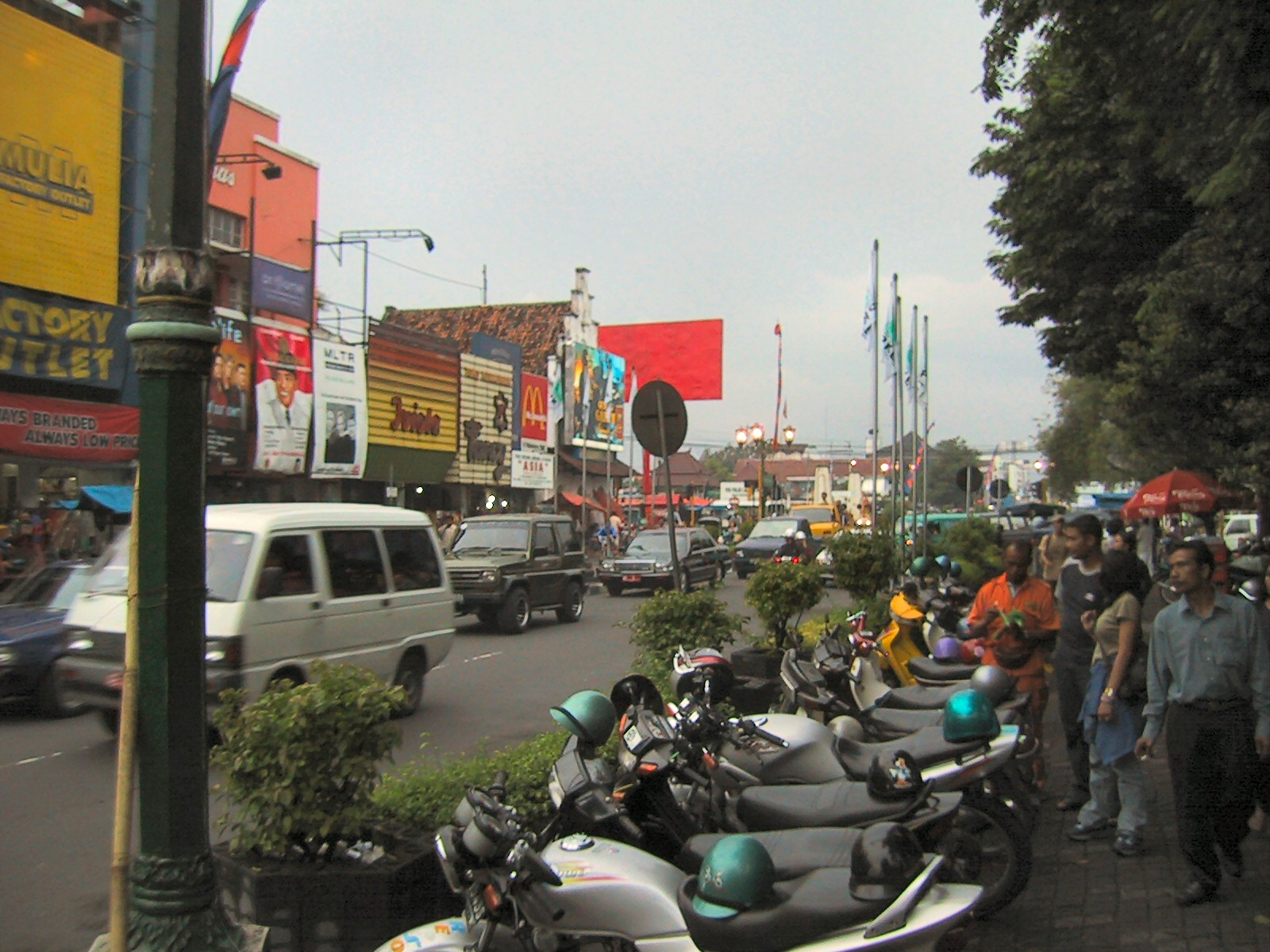
- The film follows four children on Malioboro Street
- Directed by: Garin Nugroho
- Starring: Children: Kancil, Topo, Sugeng and Hatta
- Release date: 1995
- Running time: 55 minutes
- Country: Indonesia
- Language: Indonesian

Kancil's Tale of Freedom (Indonesian: Dongeng Kancil untuk Kemerdekaan) is a 1995 Indonesian documentary film directed by Garin Nugroho.

== Synopsis ==
The film commemorates the 50th anniversary of Sukarno driving through the street in the aftermath and waving the Flag of Indonesia as he became the first President proclaiming "My nationalism is humanity".

The film investigates modern life on the street and whether early promises made by Sukarno lived up to expectations.
