= Cikini, Menteng =

Cikini
- Administrative village
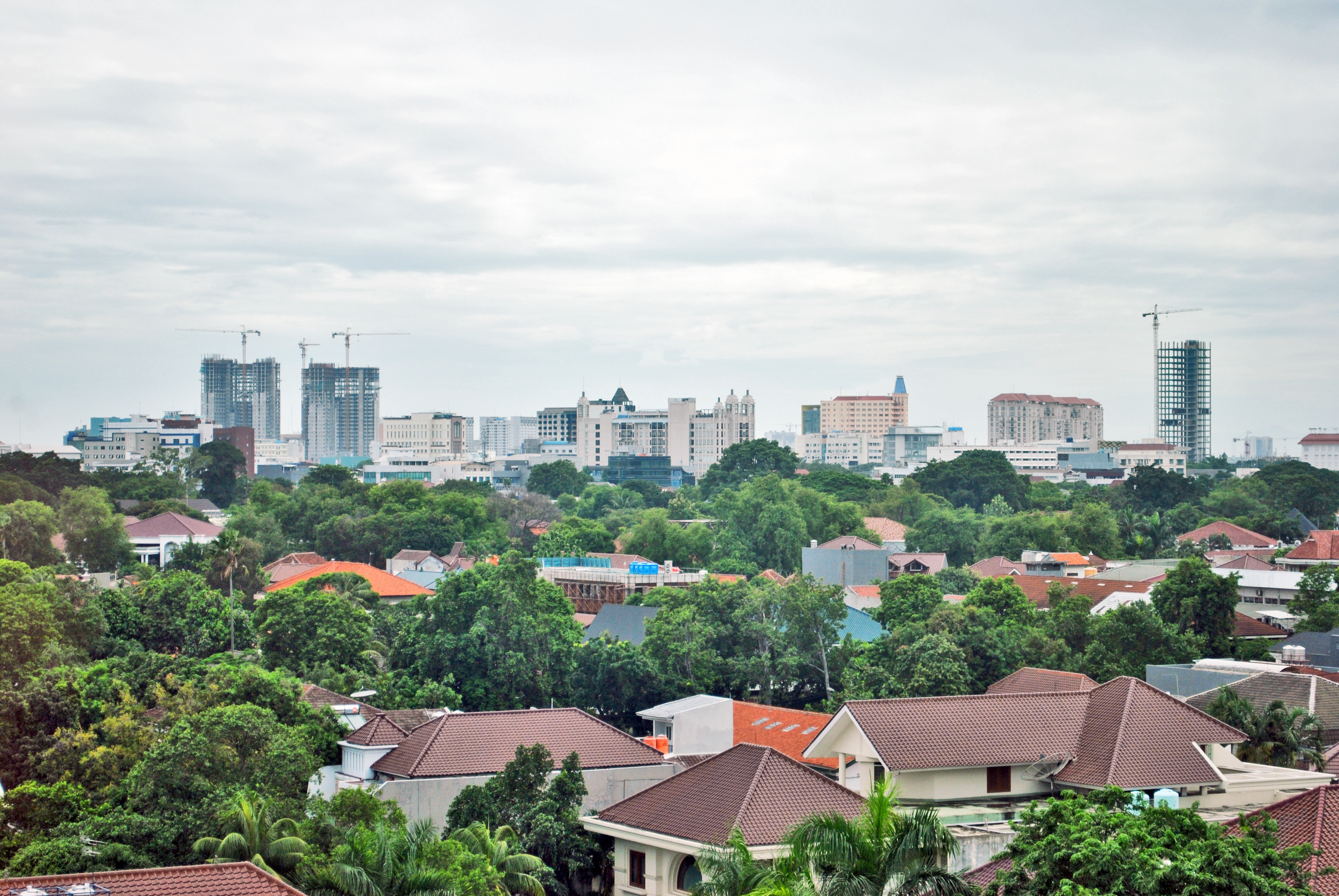
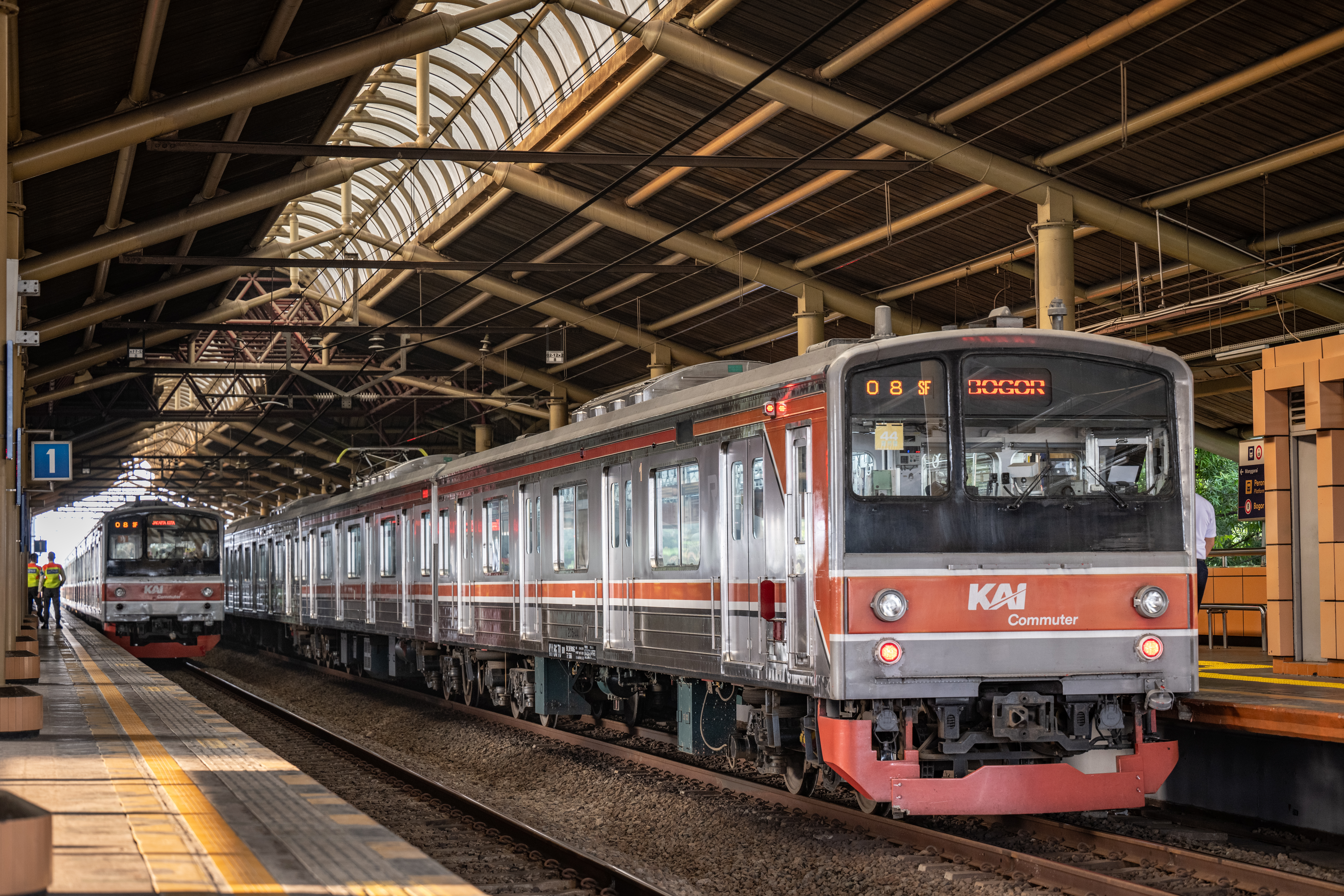
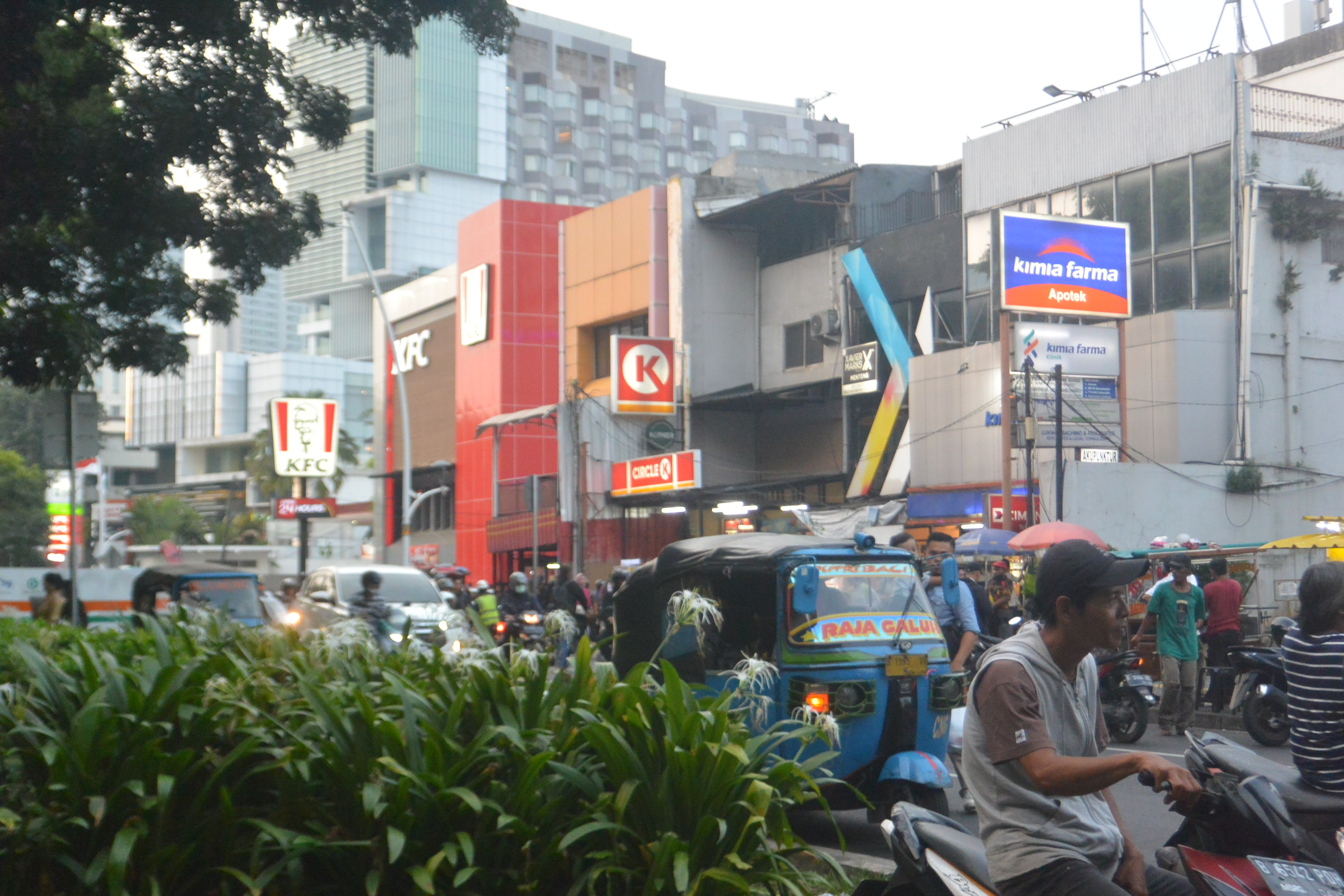
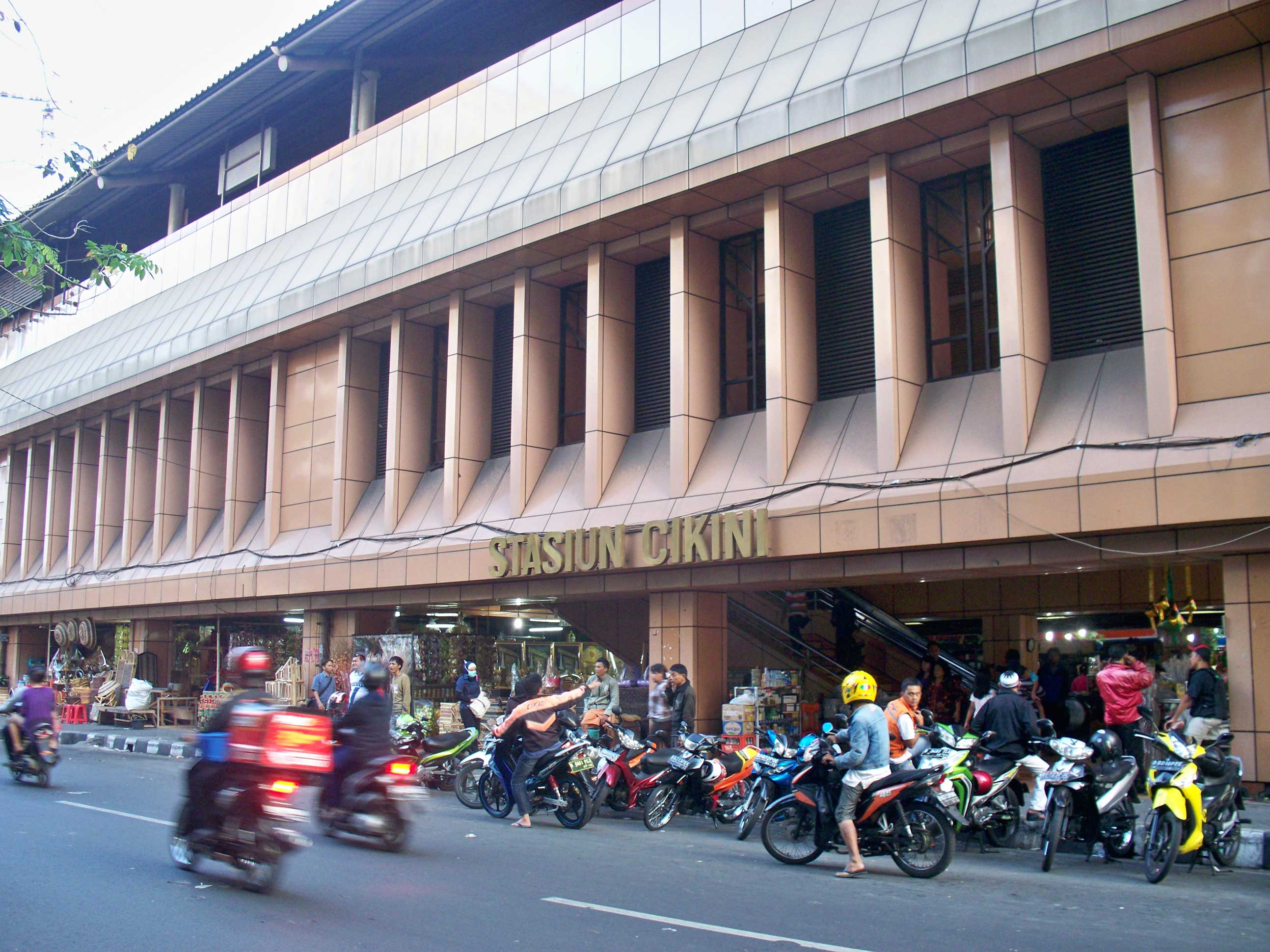
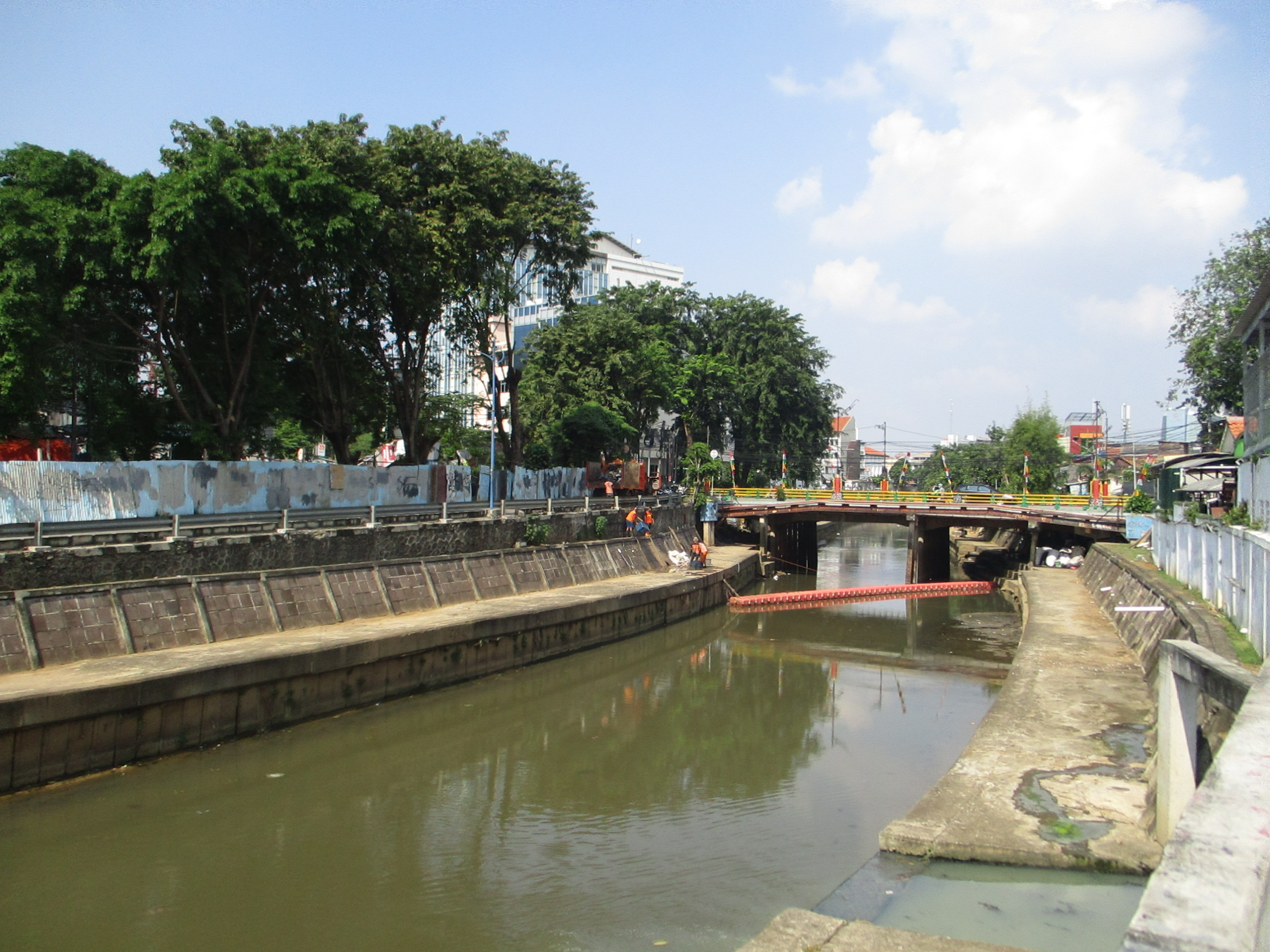
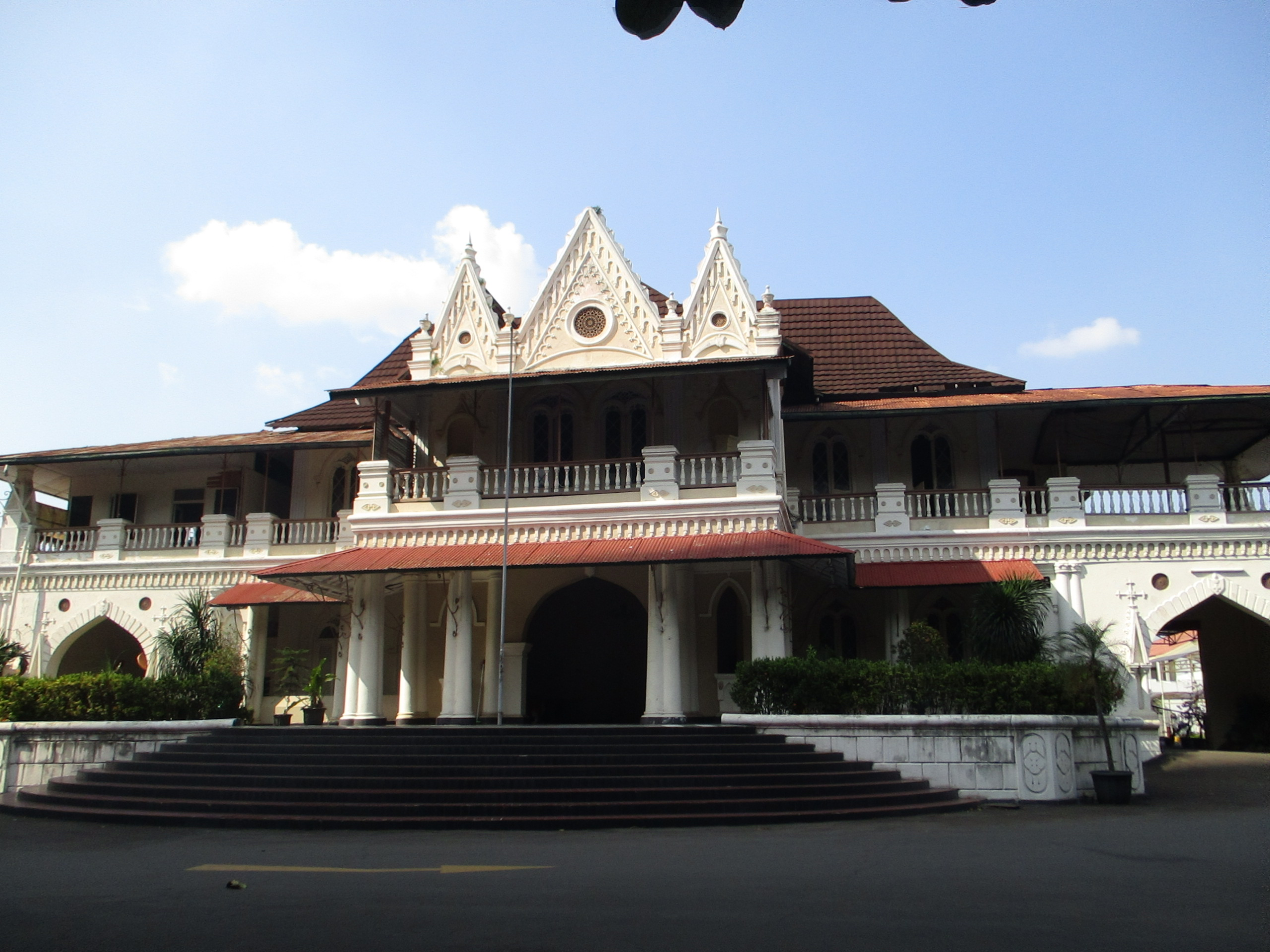
- Interactive map of Cikini
- Coordinates: 6°11′28″S 106°50′18″E
- Country: Indonesia
- Province: DKI Jakarta
- Administrative city: Central Jakarta
- District: Menteng
- Postal code: 10330

Cikini is an administrative village in the Menteng district of Indonesia. It has a postal code of 10330. Cikini has a long history that goes all the way back to the colonial period with buildings which were built during that period still standing to this day. The area has been developed as a tourist destination by the Jakarta city administration.

== History ==
During the time of the Dutch East Indies, Cikini was a special region because it was a part of the Weltevreden, or an area where Europeans primarily lived.

Raden Saleh, a painter maestro and a socialite, was, the biggest landowner in Cikini. In 1852, he designed his own "palace", which was inspired architecturally by Callenberg Castle where he had stayed during his European travels c. 1844. Surrounded by vast grounds, most of them were converted into public gardens in 1862, and were closed in the turn of the century.

In 1960, the Taman Ismail Marzuki was built in the former gardens. The house itself is still used today as a PGI Cikini Hospital building.

In 1862, the garden of his palace was donated and converted into a zoo and public park named "Planten En Dierentuin", which was the precursor of Cikini Zoo.

In 1964, the zoo was transferred to Ragunan and, in 1968, the land was transformed into TIM by Governor Ali Sadikin. At the back of Saleh's home, there are several other antique buildings, such as the Cikini Hospital Chapel, which was built in 1906.

== See also ==
- Menteng
- List of administrative villages of Jakarta
