= Jakarta Institute of Arts =

Jakarta Arts Institute
- Institut Kesenian Jakarta
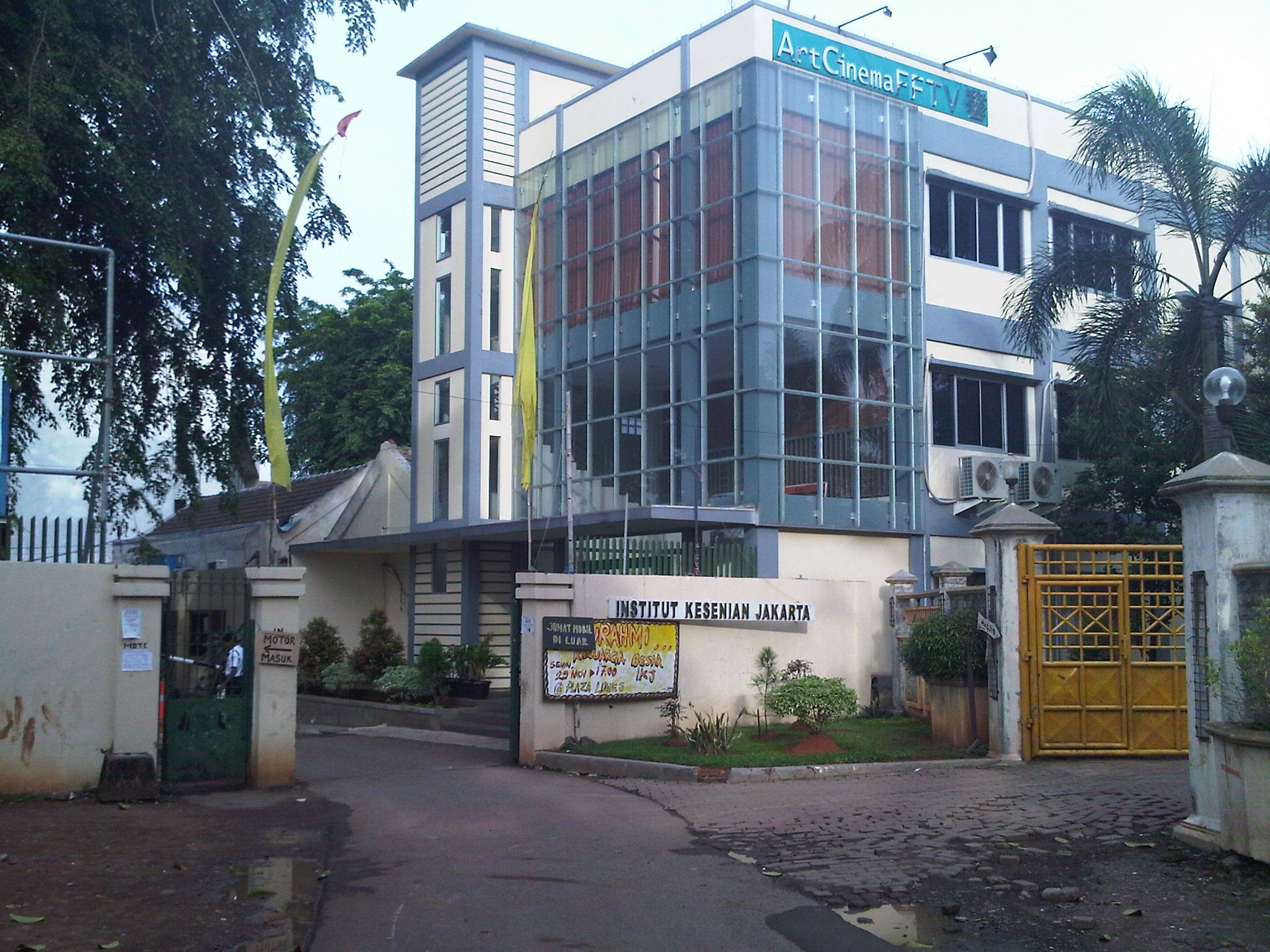
- The Jakarta Arts Institute at Ismail Marzuki Park
- Type: Private University
- Established: June 25 1976
- Parent institution: Jakarta Arts and Culture Foundation
- Rector: Syamsul Maarif
- Location: Jl. Cikini Raya No. 73, Cikini, Menteng, Jakarta Pusat, DKI Jakarta, Indonesia
- Mascot: Tree of Life
- Website: ikj.ac.id

The Jakarta Institute of Arts (Indonesian: Institut Kesenian Jakarta or IKJ) is an arts college located in Cikini, Jakarta, Indonesia. This institute specializes in fine arts, performing arts, and film arts. It was originally called the Jakarta Arts Education Institute (Indonesian: Lembaga Pendidikan Kesenian Jakarta or LPKJ) and was founded by Jakarta Governor Ali Sadikin and officiated by President Suharto on June 25, 1976.

== History ==
The propoal to create the institute itself was initially put forward by artists affiliated with the Jakarta Arts Council, an arts council which was also founded by Jakarta Governor Ali Sadikin. It was established in the Taman Ismail Marzuki complex, situated alongside the existing performance and exhibition venues. It was initially composed of five academic streams: Dance Academy, Theatre Academy, Fine Arts Academy, and Academy of Cinematography.

Its status was upgraded to an institute and it was renamed Jakarta Institute of Arts (Indonesian: Institut Kesenian Jakarta, IKJ) in 1983. The reason for the change was the Department of Education and Culture's view that its studio model and arts collective enclave model be developed into a formal educational institute under the Jakarta Special Capital Region. Some departments were restructured; the Academy of Cinematography was moved into the Faculty of Fine Arts and Design, and the Dance, Theatre and Music Academies were grouped under the Faculty of Performance Arts. The Faculty of Film and Television was also expanded to include Photography.

In the early 1990s, FFTV-IKJ became a member of Internation Assocation of School of Film and Television. FFTV IKJ, led by Soetomo Gandasubrata at the time, became a full member, at the same time that Slamet Rahardjo was appointed to be CILECT representative for Asia Pacific. After the 2008 CILECT conference in Beijing, FFTV IKJ - represented by Kusen Dony Hermansyah (Vice Dean III) and Tanete A. Pong Masak (Staff Member from Division IV), successfully promoted FFTV IKJ to become permanent member of CILECT. From this time onward, FFTV IKJ became the only CILECT representative in Indonesia.

The head teacher of Jakarta Institute of the Arts since 2004 is Sardono W. Kusomo. For the 2024–28 term, the rector is Syamsul Maarif, who previously worked for the Ministry of Marine Affairs and Fisheries, replacing Indah Tjahjawulan.

== Faculty ==
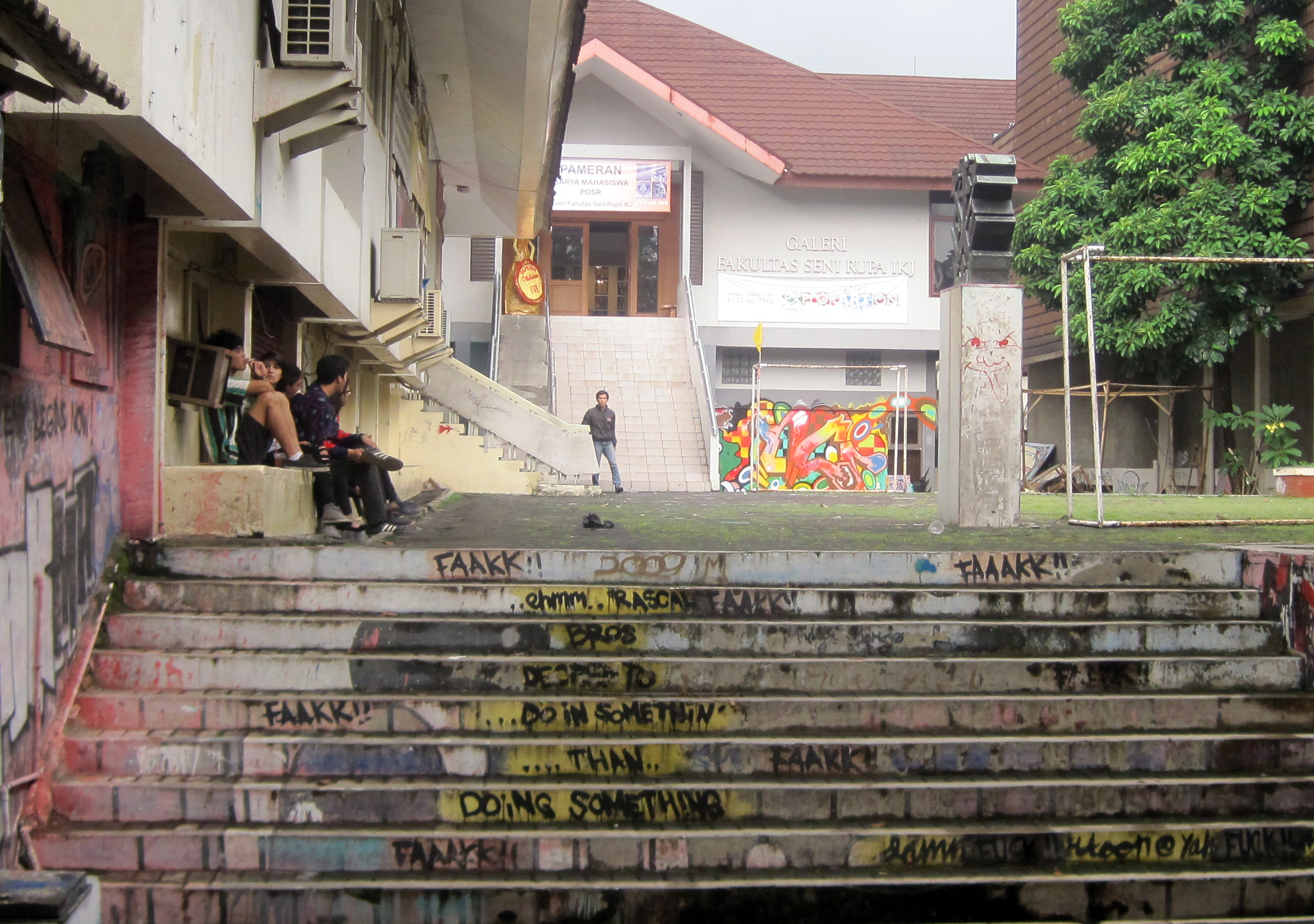
Jakarta Institute of Arts

=== Faculty of Fine Arts (Indonesian: Fakultas Seni Rupa dan Desain, FSR) ===
This Faculty specialized in the development of the arts in the visual realm, divided into three departments, which is fine arts, crafts and design.

- Program Study S-1 fine arts, divided into three focus: Painting Arts, Sculpture Arts, Graphic Arts
- Program Study S-1 Crafts, divided into three focus:Wood craft, Ceramic Arts, Textile Arts
- Design Department, divided into three focus: Program Study S-1 Interior Design, Program Study S-1 Visual Communication Design, and Program Study S-1 Fashion Design.

=== Performance Arts Faculty (Indonesian: Fakultas Senipertunjukan, FSP) ===
- Program Study S-1 Theatre Arts
- Program Study S-1 Dance Arts
- Program Study S-1 Music Arts
- Program Study S-1 Ethnomusicology

=== Faculty of Film and Television (Indonesian: Fakultas Film dan Televisi, FFTV) ===
- Program Study S-1 Film
- Program Study D-3 Film
- Program Study S-1 Television
- Program Study D-3 Television
- Program Study S-1 Photography

== Alumni ==
Alumni of Jakarta Institute of the Arts include Mira Lesmana, Garin Nugroho, Subarkah, Didi Petet, Slamet Rahardjo, and Jujur Prananto. Other notable alumni include:

- Arief Rachman, Musician
- Demi Tatipikalawan, Musician and Lecturer
- Marsyaff, Musician
- Raden Agung Hermawan, Musician
- Yanuar Raharja Giri, Musician
