= George Manook =

Armenian merchant

George Manook (Armenian: Ջորջ Մանուկ; or Gevork Manuch Merchell/Manukian Manuchariants, Armenian: Գևորգ Մերշել / Մանուկյան Մանուչարյանց) was an Armenian merchant in Java. He was among the richest figures in the Dutch East Indies, and on several occasions lent large sums of money to the Dutch government. He left behind a fortune of five million guilders when he died.

== Biography ==
He was born in New Julfa, in Persia, in 1763 or 1767 and died on 24 October 1827 in Batavia. He died a bachelor.

After significant bequests to the Armenian College (Kolkata), the Armenian School of Madras (Chennai), and ecclesiastical establishments in Armenia, Jerusalem and New Julfa, he left the balance of his estate to his two sisters and his late brother's son.
