= List of Sundanese people =

This is a list of notable Sundanese people.

== Activists ==
- Dewi Sartika, Indonesian female activist in the Dutch colonial era, Indonesian national hero
- Oto Iskandar di Nata, Indonesian nationalist activist in the Dutch colonial era, Indonesian national hero, State Minister of Indonesia

== Artists ==
- Elfa Secioria
- Erwin Gutawa, composer (half-Malay)
- Addie MS, composer
- Asep Sunandar Sunarya, Sundanese wayang golek (rod puppet) master

== Athletes ==
- Abdul Aziz Lutfi Akbar, footballer
- Asep Berlian, footballer
- Atep Rizal, footballer
- Cahya Supriadi, footballer
- Cecep Supriatna, footballer
- Dedi Kusnandar, footballer
- Dicky Indrayana, footballer
- Djadjang Nurdjaman, footballer
- Eka Ramdani, footballer
- Febri Hariyadi, footballer
- Henhen Herdiana, footballer
- Jajang Mulyana, footballer
- Jajang Sukmara, footballer
- Ricky Subagja, badminton player
- Robby Darwis, footballer
- Ryan Kurnia, footballer
- Saepulloh Maulana, footballer
- Shahar Ginanjar, footballer
- Taufik Hidayat, badminton player, 2004 Olympic gold medalist
- Wawan Hendrawan, footballer
- Yandi Sofyan, footballer
- Zaenal Arif, footballer

== Authors ==
- Achdiat Karta Mihardja, writer
- Ajip Rosidi, Indonesian poet and short story writer

== Businesspeople ==
- Betti Alisjahbana, former CEO of IBM Indonesia

== Diplomats ==
- Ali Alatas, former minister of foreign affairs of Indonesia (half-Arab)
- Hassan Wirajuda, former minister of foreign affairs of Indonesia
- Marty Natalegawa, former minister of foreign affairs of Indonesia
- Mochtar Kusumaatmadja, former minister of foreign affairs of Indonesia

== Entertainers ==
- Adhisty Zara, actress, singer, ex member of JKT48
- Kevin Liliana, actress, model, Winner of Miss International 2017
- Raffi Ahmad, actor, presenter
- Rianti Cartwright, actress, model, presenter and VJ (half- Welsh)
- Elvy Sukaesih, Dangdut singer
- Evie Tamala, Dangdut singer
- Melly Goeslaw, singer-songwriter (half Mollucans)
- Gita Gutawa, soprano singer (one quarter Malays)
- Happy Salma, actress, writer, model; became a princess and member of the Lordship of Ubud after marriage
- Ikke Nurjanah, actress, singer
- Isyana Sarasvati, singer, actress
- Jamie Aditya, TV host, actor, entertainer (half-Australian)
- Jojon, comedian
- Ebet Kadarusman, radio and TV host, talk show entertainer
- Kamidia Radisti, presenter, Miss Indonesia World 2007
- Iwa Kusuma, rapper
- Asyifa Latief, presenter. Miss Indonesia World 2010 (half-Arabs)
- Mulan Jameela, singer
- Nike Ardila, singer
- Nining Meida, Sundanese campursari singer
- Vina Panduwinata, singer
- Nia Ramadhani, actress (half-Dutch)
- Rhoma Irama, Dangdut singer, actor
- Harry Roesli, rock singer, musician
- Rossa, pop and R&B singer
- Dira Sugandi, jazz and soul singer
- Sule, comedian
- Poppy Mercury, singer
- Blaze, comedian

== Filmmakers ==
- Nia Dinata, film director

== Politicians ==
- Armida Alisjahbana, Indonesian minister
- Amirmachmud, chairman of the People's Consultative Assembly
- Agum Gumelar, former Indonesian government minister
- Ahmad Heryawan, former governor of West Java
- Dedi Mulyadi, governor of West Java
- Ridwan Kamil, former governor of West Java
- Ginandjar Kartasasmita, former Indonesian government minister
- Ma'ruf Amin, Vice President
- Djuanda Kartawidjaja, 11th Prime Minister of Indonesia
- Dada Rosada, former mayor of Bandung
- Ali Sadikin, former governor of Jakarta
- Suharna Surapranata, Indonesian minister
- Soekaesih, colonial era activist and political prisoner
- Ateng Wahyudi, former mayor of Bandung
- Umar Wirahadikusumah, former Indonesian vice president
- Rachmat Witoelar, former Indonesian government minister
- Ahmad Heryawan, former governor of West Java
- Willy Soemita, Deputy Vice President of Suriname
- Iti Octavia Jayabaya, regent of Pandeglang Regency

== See also ==
- List of Acehnese people
- List of Batak people
- List of Bugis people
- List of Chinese Indonesians
- List of Javanese people
- List of Minangkabau people
- List of Moluccan people
- Sundanese people
