= 2024 Bandung mayoral election =

- 27 November 2024
- Registered: 1,890,788
- Turnout: 64.94%
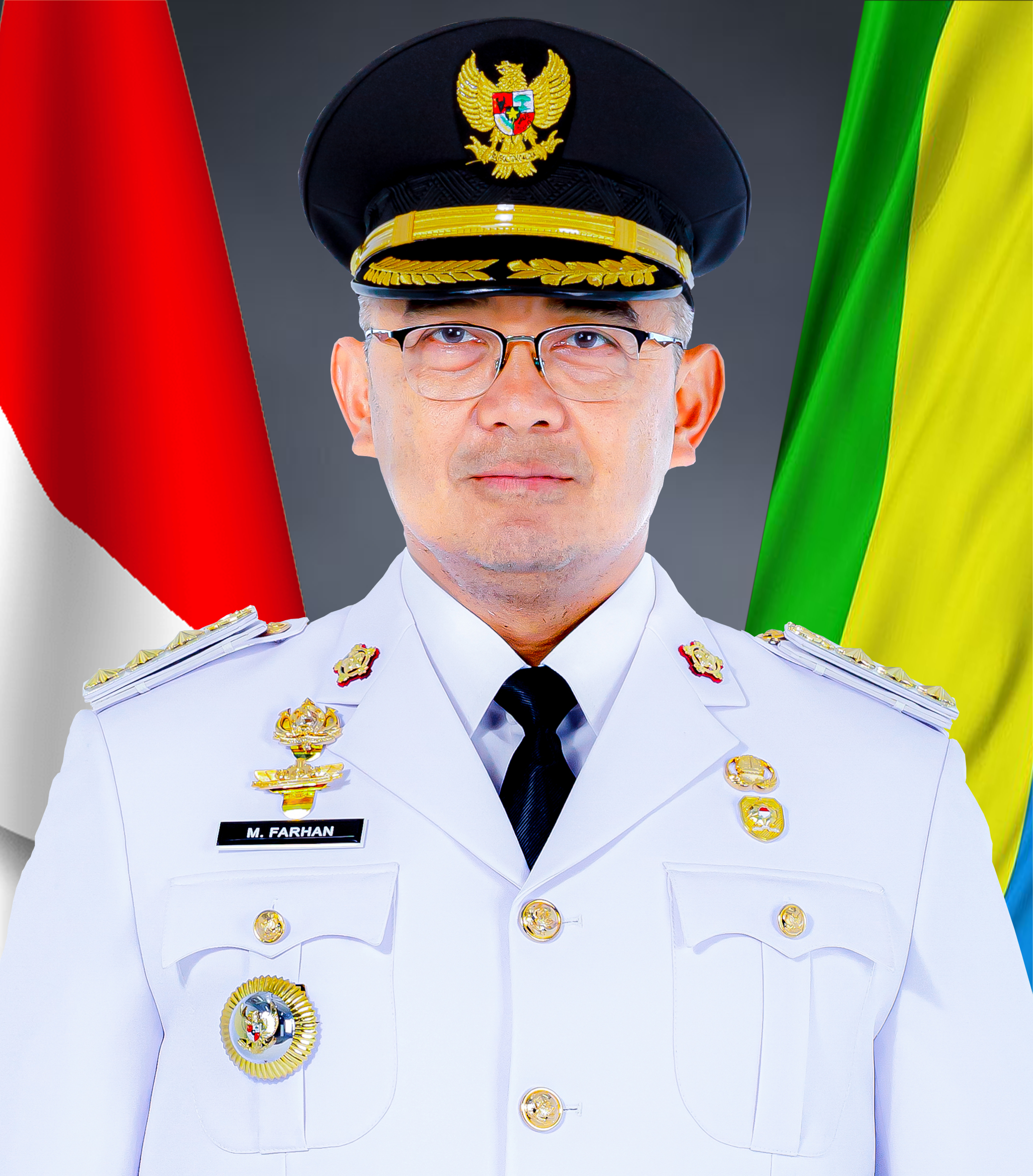

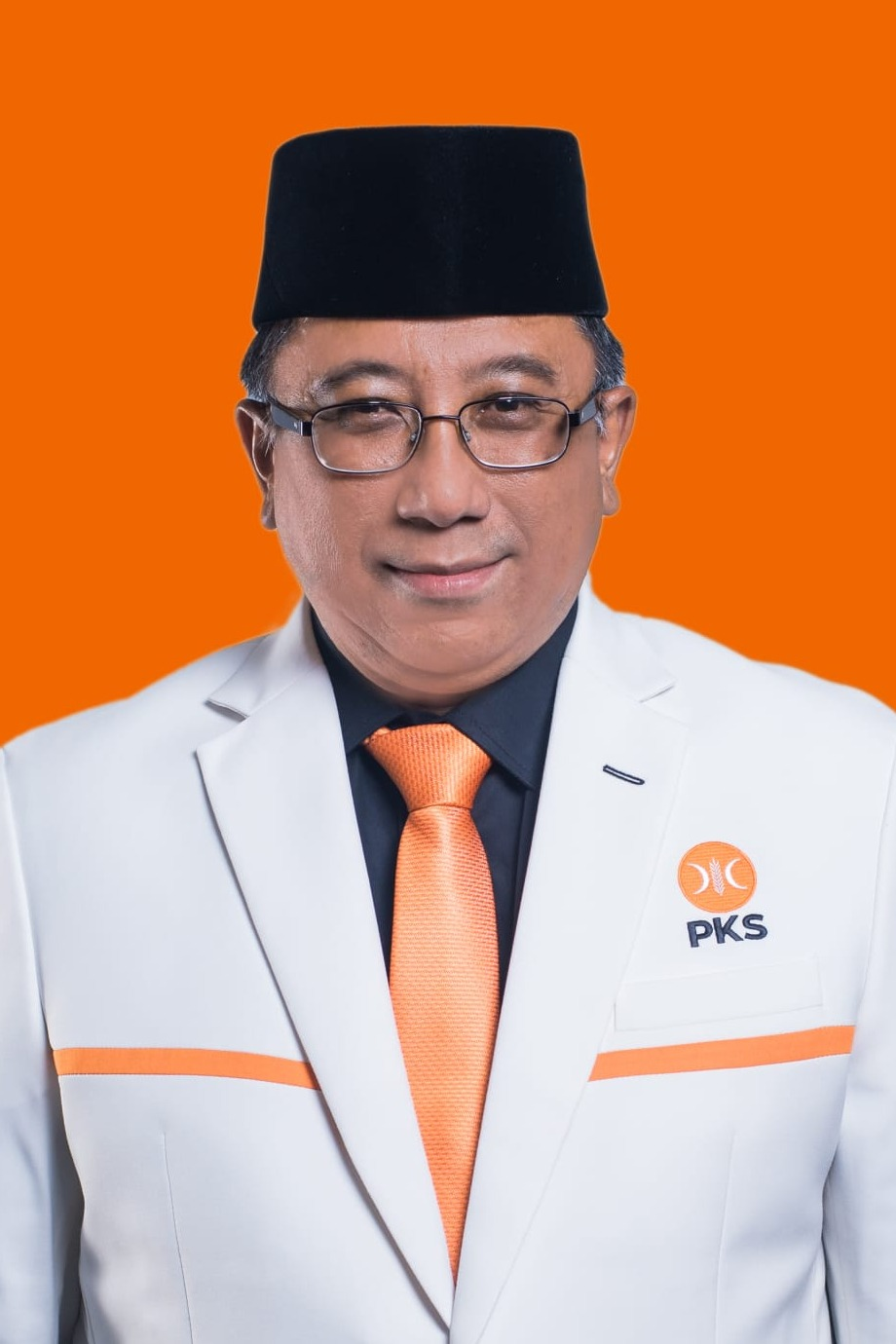

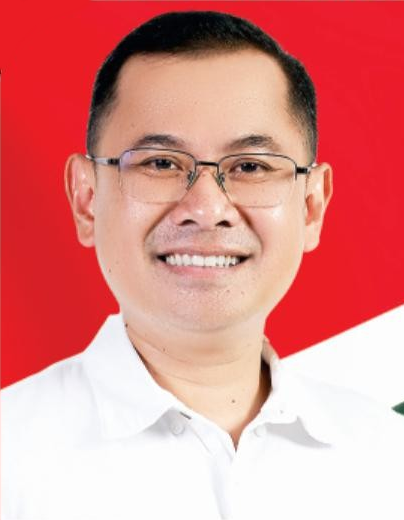

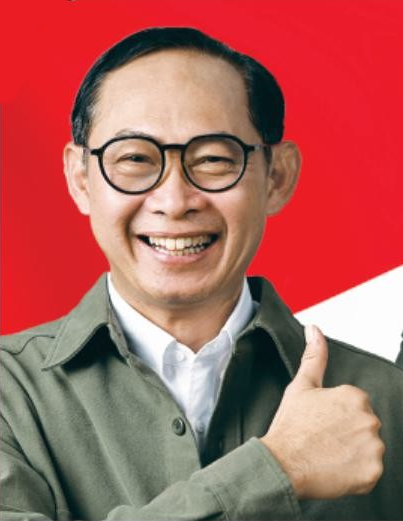
Nominee	Muhammad Farhan	Haru Suandharu
Party	NasDem	PKS
Running mate	Erwin	R. Dhani Wirianata
Popular vote	523,000	427,448
Percentage	44.64%	36.48%
Nominee	Arfi Rafnialdi	Dandan Riza Wardana
Party	Golkar	PDI-P
Running mate	Yena Iskandar	Arif Wijaya
Popular vote	137,672	83,498
Percentage	11.75%	7.13%
- Results by district and subdistrict (Interactive version)
Mayor before election
A. Koswara (acting)
Independent
Elected mayor
Muhammad Farhan
NasDem

The 2024 Bandung mayoral election was held on 27 November 2024 as part of nationwide local elections to elect the Mayor of Bandung for a five-year term. Former television presenter and House of Representatives member Muhammad Farhan of the NasDem Party won the election with 44% of the vote, defeating three other candidates. Haru Suandharu of the Prosperous Justice Party (PKS) placed second with 36%.

== Electoral system ==
The election, like other local elections in 2024, follow the first-past-the-post system where the candidate with the most votes wins the election, even if they do not win a majority. It is possible for a candidate to run uncontested, in which case the candidate is still required to win a majority of votes "against" an "empty box" option. Should the candidate fail to do so, the election will be repeated on a later date.

== Candidates ==
According to electoral regulations, candidates were required to secure support from a political party or a coalition controlling 10 seats in the Bandung City Regional House of Representatives. With 11 seats, the Prosperous Justice Party is the only party eligible to nominate a candidate without forming coalitions with other political parties. Independent candidates were required to demonstrate support in form of photocopies of identity cards, which in Bandung's case corresponds to 121,705. One independent candidate registered with the General Elections Commission by the deadline on 12 May 2024, but did not submit enough identity cards to qualify.

The previously elected mayor, Oded Muhammad Danial, died in 2021 in the middle of his term. His deputy and replacement, Yana Mulyana, was arrested by the Corruption Eradication Commission and removed from office in April 2023.

=== Potential ===
The following are individuals who have either been publicly mentioned as a potential candidate, or considered as such by press:

- Siti Muntamah (PKS), member of the West Java Regional House of Representatives and widow of Oded Muhammad Danial.
- Muhammad Farhan (NasDem), member of the House of Representatives and former television presenter.

== Political map ==
Following the 2024 Indonesian general election, ten political parties are represented in the Bandung City Regional House of Representatives:

Political parties	Seat count
Prosperous Justice Party (PKS)	11 / 50
Indonesian Democratic Party of Struggle (PDI-P)	7 / 50
Great Indonesia Movement Party (Gerindra)	7 / 50
Party of Functional Groups (Golkar)	7 / 50
NasDem Party	6 / 50
National Awakening Party (PKB)	5 / 50
Indonesian Solidarity Party (PSI)	4 / 50
Democratic Party (Demokrat)	3 / 50

== Results ==
Candidate	Running mate	Party	Votes	%
Muhammad Farhan	Erwin	NasDem Party	523,000	44.64
Haru Suandharu	R. Dhani Wirianata	Prosperous Justice Party	427,448	36.48
Arfi Rafnialdi	Yena Iskandar Ma'soem	Golkar	137,672	11.75
Dandan Riza Wardana	Arif Wijaya	Indonesian Democratic Party of Struggle	83,498	7.13
Total			1,171,618	100.00
Valid votes			1,171,618	95.57
Invalid/blank votes			54,296	4.43
Total votes			1,225,914	100.00
Registered voters/turnout			1,887,881	64.94
Source: KPU

Candidate vote share by district and subdistrict
Dandan–Arif

Haru–Dhani

Farhan–Erwin

Arfi–Yena
