= Mayor of Bandung =

Elected politician in Bandung, Indonesia

- Wali Kota Bandung
- Coat of arms of Bandung

- Flag of Bandung

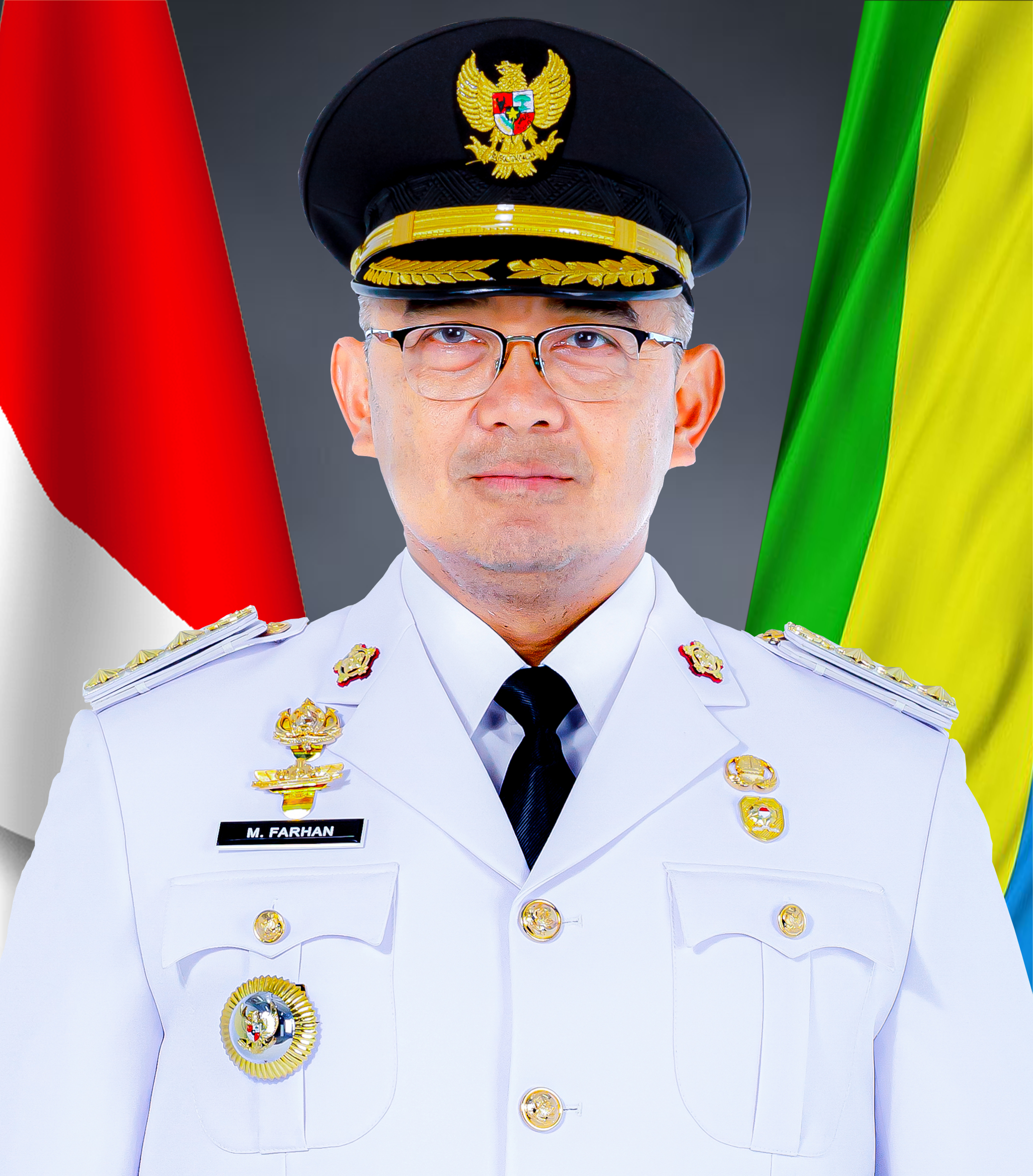
- Incumbent; Muhammad Farhan since 20 February 2025
- Term length: 5 years, renewable once
- Inaugural holder: E.A. Maurenbrecher
- Formation: 1906
- Website: www.bandung.go.id

The mayor of Bandung is an elected politician who is responsible of governing the city of Bandung. The first mayor of Bandung was E.A. Maurenbrecher, who governed the city during the Dutch colonisation period from 1906 to 1907. Since then, Bandung has been governed by 29 mayors and 6 vice mayors.

== List of mayors of Bandung ==
=== Dutch colonisation period ===
- E.A. Maurenbrecher (1906–1907)
- R.E. Krijboom (1907–1908)
- J.A. van Der Ent (1909–1910)
- J.J. Verwijk (1910–1912)
- C.C.B van Vlenier (1912–1913)
- B. van Bijveld (1913–1920)
- Bertus Coops (1920–1921)
- Steven Anne Reitsma (1921–1928)
- Bertus Coops (2nd term) (1928–1934)
- J.E.A. van Wolzogen Kuhr (1934–1936)
- J.M. Wesselink (1936–1942)

=== Japanese occupation period ===
- R.A. Atmadinata (1942–1945)

=== Post-independence period ===
No.	Portrait	Name	Term of office		Vice Mayor	Election
No.	Portrait	Name	Took office	Left office	Vice Mayor	Election
1		R.A. Atmadinata	17 August 1945	1 November 1945	None	—
2		Sjamsuridjal	1 November 1945	1 March 1947	None	—
3		Ukar Bratakusumah	1 March 1947	1 December 1949	None	—
4		R. Enoch	1 December 1949	2 April 1957	None	—
5		R. Priatna Kusumah	2 April 1957	1966	None	1957
6		R. Didi Djukardi	1966	1968	None	1966
7		R. Hidayat Sukarmadidjaja	1968	11 January 1971	None	1968
8		R Otje Djoendjoenan	11 January 1971	16 January 1976	None	1971
9		Utju Djoenadi	16 January 1976	6 April 1978	None	1976
10		Husen Wangsaatmadja	6 April 1978	16 October 1983	None	1978
11		Ateng Wahyudi	16 October 1983	16 October 1993	Matin Burhan	1983; 1988
12		Wahyu Hamijaya	16 October 1993	16 October 1998	E. Soedarsono	1993
13		Aa Tarmana	16 October 1998	16 October 2003	Vacant	1998
14		Dada Rosada	16 October 2003	16 September 2008	Jusep Purwasuganda	2003
14		Dada Rosada	16 September 2008	19 August 2013	Ayi Vivananda	2008
15		Ridwan Kamil	16 September 2013	4 September 2018 (Note: Resigned after being elected as the Governor of West Java)	Oded Muhammad Danial	2013
16		Oded Muhammad Danial	20 September 2018	10 December 2021 (Note: Died in office)	Yana Mulyana	2018
17		Yana Mulyana	18 April 2022	15 April 2023 (Note: The position was taken over by Ema Sumarna, after being arrested of corruption)	Vacant	—
18		Muhammad Farhan	20 February 2025	Incumbent	Erwin	2024

== Acting mayor ==
In the case of government, a regional head who applies for leave or temporarily resigns from his position with the central government, then the Governor of West Java prepares a replacement who is a bureaucrat in the regional government or even a deputy mayor, including when the mayor's position is in a transition period.

No	Portrait	Name	Took office	Left office	Mayor
1		Steven Anne Reitsma	22 May 1920	22 September 1921	Bertus Coops
2		Ayi Vivananda	20 August 2013	16 September 2013	Dada Rosada
3		Muhamad Solihin	14 February 2018	23 June 2018	Ridwan Kamil
4		Oded Muhammad Danial	4 September 2018	16 September 2018	Ridwan Kamil
5		Dadang Supriatna	16 September 2018	20 September 2018	Transition
6		Yana Mulyana	10 December 2021	18 April 2022	Oded Muhammad Danial
7		Ema Sumarna	15 April 2023	20 September 2023	Yana Mulyana
8		Bambang Tirtoyuliono	20 September 2023	20 September 2024	Transition
9		A. Koswara	20 September 2024	20 February 2025	Transition

== See also ==
- Bandung
- List of incumbent regional heads and deputy regional heads in West Java
