= Husen Wangsaatmadja =

Indonesian military officer and politician

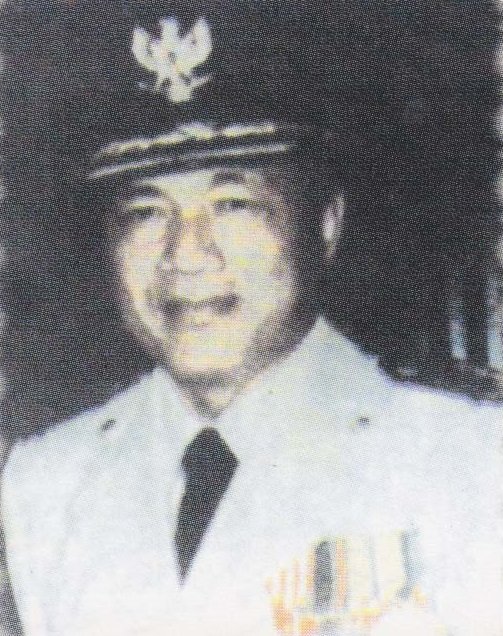
- Official portrait

10th Mayor of Bandung
- In office 18 October 1978 – 16 October 1983
- Preceded by: Utju Djoenadi
- Succeeded by: Ateng Wahyudi

Regent of Tasikmalaya
- In office February 1966 – February 1974
- Preceded by: Memed Supartadiredja
- Succeeded by: Kartiwa Suriasaputra

Personal details
- Born: 28 August 1926
- Died: 14 February 1988 (aged 61)

Military service
- Branch/service: Indonesian Army
- Rank: Colonel

Husen Wangsaatmadja (28 August 1926 – 14 February 1988) was an Indonesian military officer and politician who served as the Mayor of Bandung between 1978 and 1983 and regent of Tasikmalaya Regency between 1966 and 1974. He had previously served in the Indonesian Army and reached the rank of colonel.

== Early life and military career ==
Husen Wangsaatmadja was born on 28 August 1926. He served in the Indonesian Army during the Indonesian National Revolution as a military instructor. He also commanded a battalion stationed in Cikotok, Lebak Regency. After independence, Wangsaatmadja became a captain and in 1959 was commander of a battalion within Kodam III/Siliwangi. By 1962, as a major, he was commander of the Karawang Military District. He was then promoted to lieutenant colonel and was commander of the Bandung Military District in 1963–1964.

== Government career ==
Between February 1966 and February 1974, as a lieutenant colonel, he served as the regent of Tasikmalaya Regency. During his time in the office, he complained of the centralized decision making in place, calling it a "centralist-verticalist disease".

On 18 October 1978, as an army colonel, he was sworn in as mayor of Bandung. During his tenure, in 1981, a "cholera-like" diarrhea epidemic broke out in Bandung Regency, killing around a hundred people. In response, Wangsaatmadja ordered city health workers to conduct house-to-house checks to combat the spread of the disease into the densely populated sections of the city proper. The city government engaged in a number of project to improve the city's drainage system to reduce flooding. Wangsaatmadja also created a dedicated Historical Building team in order to catalogue buildings of historic value in the city for purposes of preservation.

He did not contest for a second term in 1983, and Ateng Wahyudi was selected by the Bandung city council to replace him. His tenure ended in October 1983.

== Later life ==
Outside of his career in the military and government, Wangsaatmadja also kept sheep, and in the 1970s he founded an association for sheep and goat keepers in West Java which later evolved into a national organization. He died on 14 February 1988 and was buried at the Cikutra Heroes' Cemetery in Bandung. His son Setiawan Wangsaatmaja later became a civil servant, becoming the provincial secretary of West Java province.
