= Muhammad Farhan =

Indonesian television presenter and politician (born 1970)

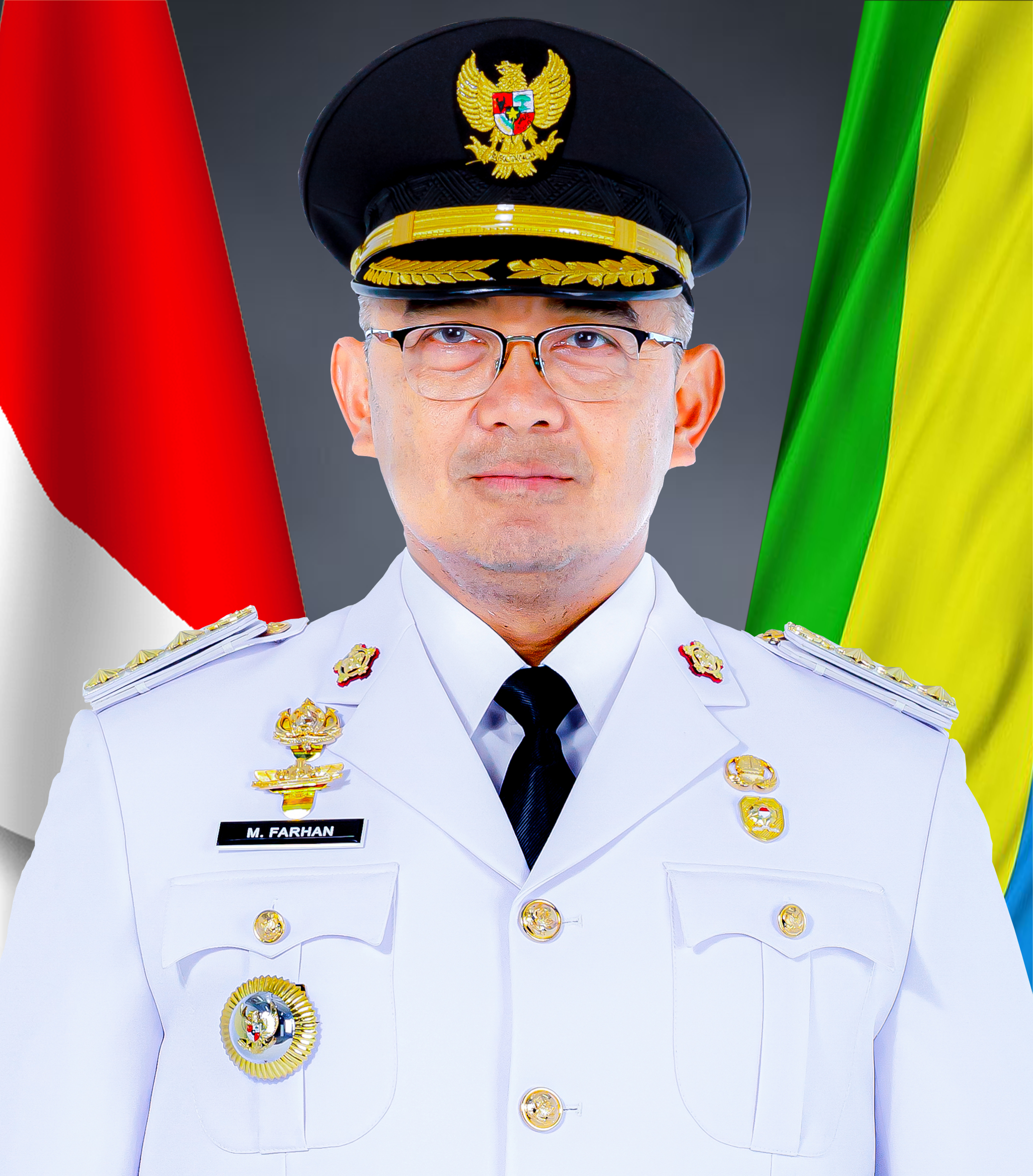
- Official portrait, 2025

18th Mayor of Bandung
- Incumbent
- Assumed office 20 February 2025
- Deputy: Erwin
- Preceded by: Yana Mulyana; Ema Sumarna (acting); Bambang Tirtoyuliono (acting); A. Koswara (acting)

Member of the House of Representatives
- In office 1 October 2019 – 1 October 2024
- Parliamentary group: National Democratic Party Faction
- Constituency: West Java I
- Majority: 52,033

Personal details
- Born: 25 February 1970 (age 56) Bogor, Indonesia
- Party: NasDem (2019–present)
- Education: Padjadjaran University

Muhammad Farhan (born 25 February 1970) is an Indonesian politician from the NasDem Party and former television and radio presenter who is currently served as the 18th mayor of Bandung since February 2025. He had previously been a member of the House of Representatives between 2019 and 2024 representing Bandung and Cimahi.

Born in Bogor, Farhan spent his childhood in Bandung where he began to work at a radio station. He then moved to Jakarta and worked for private radio and TV stations until the 2010s, when he retired from media and began to enter politics. Joining Nasdem, he was elected to the House of Representatives in the 2019 legislative election, and while he failed to win reelection in 2024, he was instead elected mayor of Bandung in the 2024 mayoral election.

== Early life ==
Muhammad Farhan was born in Bogor on 25 February 1970 to Yahid Hamzah and Nani Rubiyani. He is of mixed Acehnese–Sundanese descent. He studied in Bandung, completing elementary school in 1982, middle school in 1985, and high school in 1988. He studied economics at Padjadjaran University and received his bachelor's degree in 1995. During his time in Bandung, he briefly worked as an announcer at a radio station, and also became a vegetables supplier to Pizza Hut to fund his studies.

== Media career ==
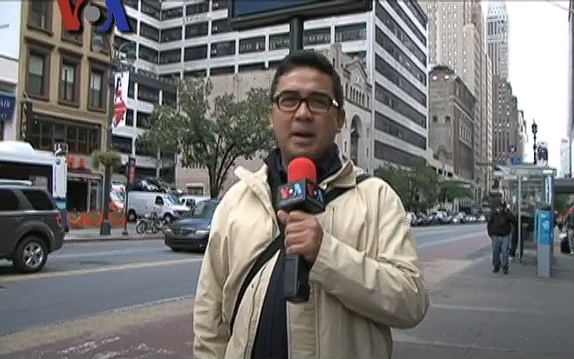
Farhan in 2013, presenting for Voice of America.

After graduating from Padjadjaran, Farhan began to work as a radio presenter. He moved to Jakarta's Mustang FM and Hard Rock FM, then to Delta FM. In 2001, Farhan along with co-presenter Indy Barends continually broadcast from Hard Rock FM for 32 hours to commemorate the station's fifth anniversary, becoming the Indonesian national records, and they held it until Gofar Hilman broadcast nonstop for 34 hours in 2019.

Farhan also worked as a television presenter, working for RCTI, SCTV, and Indosiar between 1996 and 2002. Later, Farhan joined Trans TV, where he was involved with the Extravaganza variety show. In March 2006, Farhan moved to ANTV, which offered him higher pay, and then to tvOne. At tvOne, Farhan presented the Tatap Muka talkshow, which began in 2008. He stated that he was retiring from presenting in 2015, although he still took on MC work in events. In 2016, Farhan returned to presenting, joining Metro TV and presenting the Nite Time program.

Farhan have also played supporting roles in the several films, namely Jakarta Undercover (2007), Crush (2014), Dilan 1990 (2018), and Dilan 1991 (2019).

== Politics ==
Between 2009 and 2016, Farhan was involved at Persib Bandung, and during the period prospective Bandung mayor Ridwan Kamil considered picking Farhan as a running mate in his 2013 mayoral bid. While Farhan did not take his offer, he explored running as mayor in 2017, but withdrew his bid due to poor polling. He later joined Ridwan Kamil's campaign team in the 2018 West Java gubernatorial election.

In 2018, he joined the NasDem Party to run in the 2019 Indonesian legislative election. In the election, he ran for a House of Representatives (DPR) seat representing West Java's 1st electoral district covering Bandung and Cimahi, securing 52,033 votes and winning a seat. He was appointed to DPR's First Commission. Farhan failed to secure a second term in his 2024 reelection bid, with Nasdem winning no seats in the district.

=== Mayor of Bandung ===
After the legislative election, Farhan registered to run as mayor of Bandung in the 2024 Bandung mayoral election. Erwin, a Bandung city legislator and chairman of the National Awakening Party (PKB)'s local branch, became his running mate. Aside from Nasdem and PKB, the pair was also endorsed by the Labour Party and Gelora Party. Farhan and Erwin won the election with 523,000 votes (44.6%) in the a four-way race, winning in 23 out of 30 districts of the city. They were sworn in on 20 February 2025.

As mayor, Farhan claimed that he would avoid new "monumental" construction projects, stating that he would focus on maintaining existing Art Deco buildings and infrastructure maintenance. Responding to flooding in May 2025, he requested that the city's inhabitants living on riverbanks voluntarily relocate.

== Personal life ==
He married Aryatri in September 1998, and the couple had two children. His eldest son, Muhammad Ridzky Khalid, died in 2015 from leukemia.
