= Hana Malasan =

Indonesian actress (born 1991)

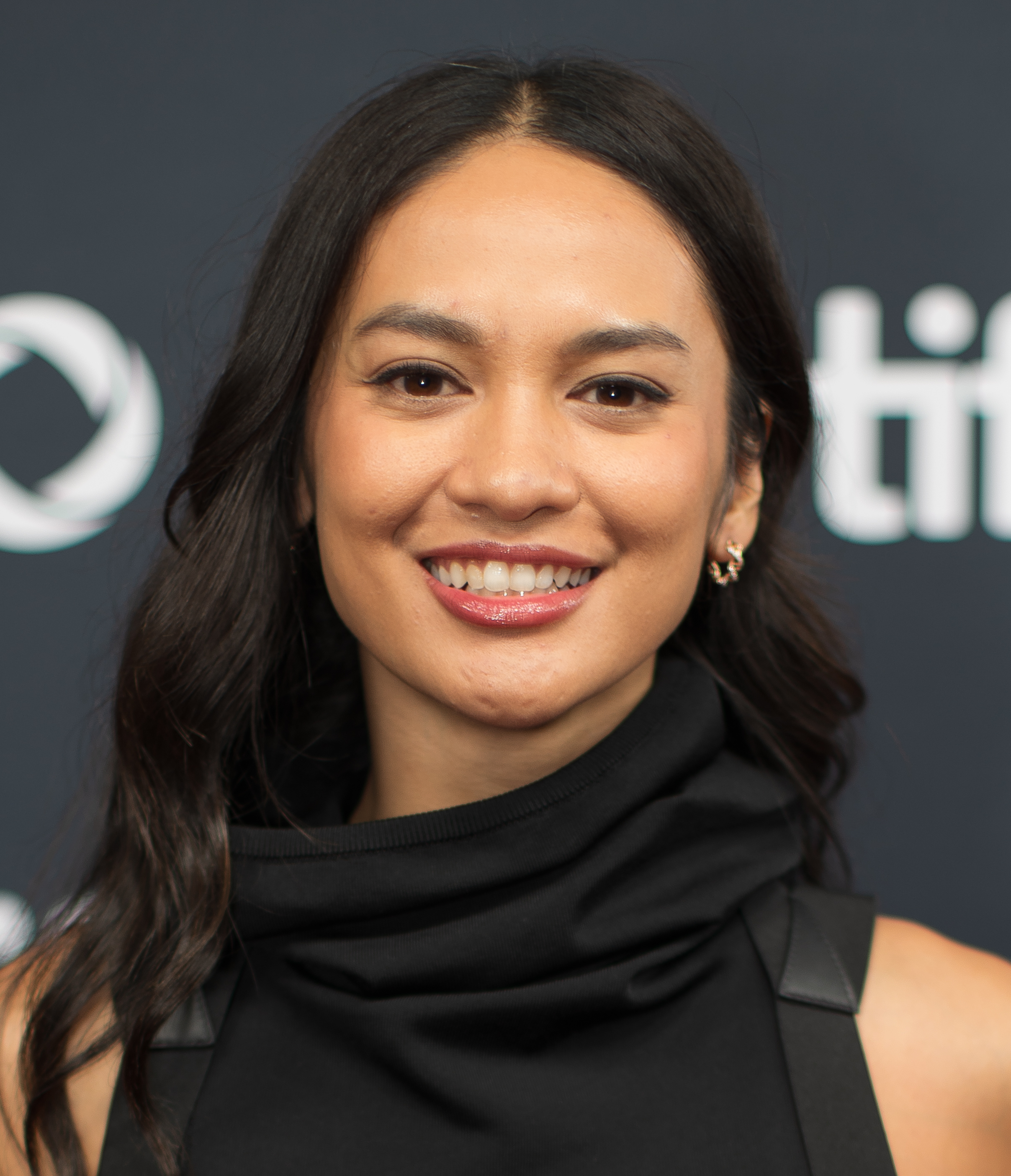
- Malasan in 2024
- Born: Hana Prinantina Malasan; 1991 (age 34–35); Tokyo, Japan
- Other name: Hana Pitrashata Malasan
- Occupation: Actress
- Years active: 2006–present

Hana Malasan (born 1991) is an Indonesian actress and model. She started her career in 2006 when she became a finalist in the cover model contest Gadis Sampul, held by teen magazine Gadis. She received her first Citra Award nomination for Best Actress for her role in Bete's Love at the 2021 ceremony. She then was nominated for a Citra Award for Best Supporting Actress at the 2025 Indonesian Film Festival for her role in The Shadow Strays.

== Early life and career ==
Hana Malasan was born in 1991 in Tokyo, Japan, where her father was pursuing his master's and doctorate degrees. She lived there until the age of ten before moving back to Bandung, Indonesia. In 2006, she became a finalist in the cover model contest Gadis Sampul, held by teen magazine Gadis. She started her acting career in television films in 2011. She starred in NET. war drama series Patriot in 2015 and comedy series OK-JEK in 2016. In 2016, she also starred as Nuke in Catatan Si Boy: The Series, a remake of the 1987 film of the same name.

In 2017, she starred in her first film role as Annisa Satirah in action thriller film Night Bus. She then starred as the title character in drama film Bete's Love in 2021. She received a Citra Award nomination for Best Actress at the 2021 Indonesian Film Festival. In 2024, she starred as Umbra in Timo Tjahjanto's action crime film The Shadow Strays. For her role in the film, she received a nomination for a Citra Award for Best Supporting Actress at the 2025 Indonesian Film Festival. She also starred in Joko Anwar's thriller film The Siege at Thorn High as Diana, a school teacher.

== Personal life ==
In February 2017, Malasan married her boyfriend Boy in Bandung. It was reported in 2023 that she was no longer married.

In October 2025, Malasan and racing driver Sean Gelael announced their engagement.

== Filmography ==
=== Film ===
Year	Title	Role	Notes
2017	Night Bus	Annisa Satirah	
2017	Jomblo	Tika	
2018	22 Menit	Mitha	
2021	Bete's Love	Bete Kaebauk	
2021	Langit Kala Senja	Kala	
2022	Ben & Jody	Rinjani	
2023	Detektif Jaga Jarak	Citra	
2023	Susuk	Laras	
2024	The Train of Death	Purnama	
2024	The Shadow Strays	Umbra	
2024	Sorop	Hanif	
2025	The Siege at Thorn High	Diana	
2025	Cursed	Adult Vina	
2026	Kupeluk Kamu Selamanya	Naya	
2026	Four Seasons in Java	Niken	Post-production

=== Television ===
Year	Title	Role	Network	Notes
2015	Patriot	Karin	NET.	
2016	OK-JEK	Cindy	NET.	
2016	Catatan Si Boy: The Series	Nuke	NET.	
2019	Namanya Juga Mertua!	Risma	GoPlay	
2019–2020	Tunnel	Ayusita	GoPlay	
2020	Sarung Milik Ayah	Disti	Vidio	
2020	Halusinada	Reyna	Stro	Season 2
2022	Serigala Terakhir	Bintang	Vidio	Season 2
2022	12 Hari	Annisa / Debora	Vision+	
2024	Ratu Adil	Elvara	Vidio	
