= Wahyu Hamijaya =

Mayor of Bandung
- In office 16 October 1993 – 16 October 1998
- Preceded by: Ateng Wahyudi
- Succeeded by: Aa Tarmana

Personal details
- Born: 1944 or 1945
- Died: 8 April 2010 (aged 65); Bandung, West Java, Indonesia

Military service
- Branch/service: Indonesian Army
- Rank: Colonel

Wahyu Hamijaya (1944/1945 – 8 April 2010) was an Indonesian military officer and politician who was the Mayor of Bandung for one term between 1993 and 1998. He was a colonel in the Indonesian Army.

== Career ==
Immediately prior to being sworn in as mayor, he was a colonel in the Indonesian Army, as commander of the 72nd Military Area Command in the Yogyakarta Special Region. He was elected by vote of the Bandung city council on 13 September 1993, receiving 38 of 45 votes cast. He was made mayor officially the following month.

During his tenure as mayor, Hamijaya relocated street vendors into a centralized location, but within a month, the vendors returned to their previous spots leading to clashes with municipal officials when the government attempted to move them back. This eventually led to a number of shophouses in the city being damaged. Hamijaya was replaced by Aa Tarmana in 1998.

== Death ==
He died on 8 April 2010 at the Hasan Sadikin Hospital in Bandung, at the age of 65, due to brain hemorrhage. He was buried in Pameutingan village in Bandung Regency, near his home.
