= 2018 Bandung mayoral election =

Local election in Indonesia

- 27 June 2018
- Turnout: 76.6%
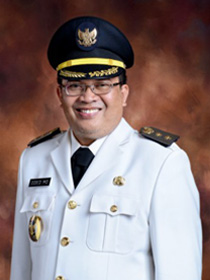

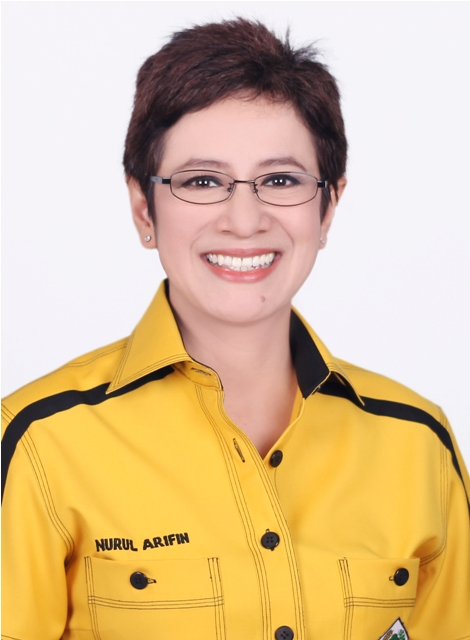
Nominee	Oded M. Danial	Yossi Irianto	Nurul Arifin
Party	PKS	PDI-P	Golkar
Running mate	Yana Mulyana	Aries Supriatna	Chairul Yaqin Hidayat
Popular vote	634,688	330,730	301,418
Percentage	50.10%	26.11%	23.79%
Mayor before election
Ridwan Kamil
Independent
Elected mayor
Oded Muhammad Danial
PKS

The 2018 Bandung mayoral election took place on 27 June 2018 as part of the simultaneous local elections. It was held to elect the mayor of Bandung along with their deputy.

Sitting mayor Ridwan Kamil, while eligible for a second term, did not run due to his bid for the province's governorship. Vice mayor Oded Muhammad Danial came out on top, defeating city secretary Yossi Irianto in addition to former lawmaker and Golkar politician Nurul Arifin.

== Timeline ==
The KPU has stated that there will be approximately 1.7 million voters in the city. Registration for party-backed candidates were opened between 8 and 10 January 2018, while independent candidates were required to register between 22 and 26 November 2017. The campaigning period would commence between 15 February and 24 June, with a three-day election silence before voting on 27 June. The vote itself follows a first past the post system.

The candidates were assigned their order number on 13 February 2018. A public debate covered by media outlets was held on 15 April 2018.

== Candidates ==
#	Candidate	Position	Running mate	Parties
1	Nurul Arifin	Deputy secretary general of Golkar; Member of DPR (2004-2014)	Chairul Yaqin Hidayat	Golkar; PKB; Demokrat; Perindo; Total: 13 seats
2	Yossi Irianto	City secretary of Bandung	Aries Supriatna	PDI-P; Nasdem; Hanura; PPP; PSI; Total: 24 seats
3	Oded Muhammad Danial	Vice mayor of Bandung	Yana Mulyana	PKS; Gerindra; Total: 13 seats

Incumbent Ridwan Kamil participated in the 2018 West Java gubernatorial election, and declared that he will not be running for re-election in December 2017. Instead, he endorsed the Yossi-Aries ticket. Some independent candidates registered, but none passed the required qualifications in form of identity card copies.

Nurul Arifin's candidacy was backed by her party since mid-2017. Her running mate is Chairul Yaqin Hidayat, who is the vice-treasurer in Demokrat. She became eligible to run once the pair secured the support of PKB and hence controlling sufficient seats in the parliament. Newly registered political party Perindo also endorsed the pair.

City secretary Yossi Irianto first received the endorsement of Hanura in November 2017, followed by Nasdem. PDI-P and PPP endorsed the pair in the days leading up to the registration, with the former attaching Aries Supriatna as the running mate. Days before the election new party PSI endorse this pair.

Ridwan Kamil's deputy Oded M Danial was officially endorsed by PKS in October 2017. Gerindra endorsed him, with Yana Mulyana being set as his running mate on the last day of registration.

== Polling ==
=== After nominations ===
Pollster	Date	Sample size	Results
Rectoverso Institute	17–25 March 2018	400	Oded M. Danial (45%), Yossi Irianto (31.5%), Nurul Arifin (19%)

=== Before nominations ===
Pollster	Date	Sample size	Results
CiGMark	1-12 December 2017	440	Oded M. Danial (27.2%), Ayi Vivandana (8.1%), M Farhan (7.9%), Nurul Arifin (5.2%), Yossi Irianto (4.2%)
Instrat	22-26 September 2017	500	Oded M. Danial (10.4%), Nurul Arifin (5.6%), M Farhan (5.6%), Yossi Irianto (4.8%), Fiki Satari (4.2%)

== Results ==
Candidate	Count	Percentage
Oded Danial	634,682	50,1%
Yossi Irianto	330,730	26,1%
Nurul Arifin	301,418	23,8%
Valid votes	1,266,830	97.0%
Invalid votes	39,042	3.0%
Voter turnout	1,305,872	78.7%
Total eligible voters	1,659,017	100.00%
