= Blok Tempe =

Blok Tempe is a residence in Bandung, West-Java, Indonesia. Before 1998, this residence was known as an area which some former criminals gather. But from 2005 until 2010, some people and led by the leader of Bandung Creative City Forum, Ridwan Kamil, developed that area so that area become a productive residence in Bandung. Now, Blok Tempe become a good residence in Bandung, which have a public area for children play and develop their traditional culture.
