= 2008 Bandung mayoral election =

- 10 August 2008
- Turnout: 69.89%
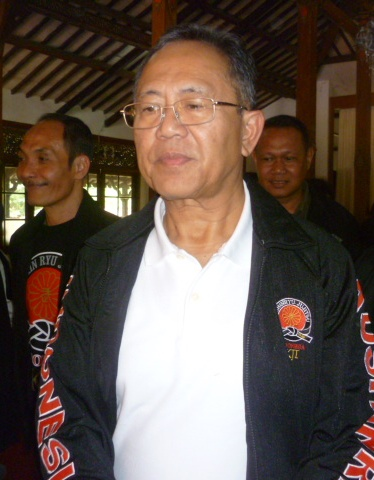
Nominee	Dada Rosada	Taufikurahman
Party	Demokrat	Independent
Running mate	Ayi Vivananda	Deni Triesnahadi
Popular vote	667,026	263,711
Percentage	64.98%	25.69%
Mayor before election
Dada Rosada
Demokrat
Elected mayor
Dada Rosada
Demokrat

A mayoral election was held in Bandung on 10 August 2008. The election was the first direct mayoral election for the city.

Three pairs of candidates contested the election, including the incumbent mayor Dada Rosada. Rosada, who was supported by a coalition of parties Golkar, PDI-P, PAN, Demokrat and PPP, won the election in a landslide, securing nearly 65 percent of the total votes.

== Results ==
Candidate	Votes	%
Dada Rosada/Ayi Vivananda	667,026	64.98
Taufikurahman/Abu Syauqi	263,711	25.69
Endang Hudaya/Nahadi	95,728	9.33
Total	1,026,465	100.00
