= Bandros =

Tour bus which operates in Bandung, West Java, Indonesia

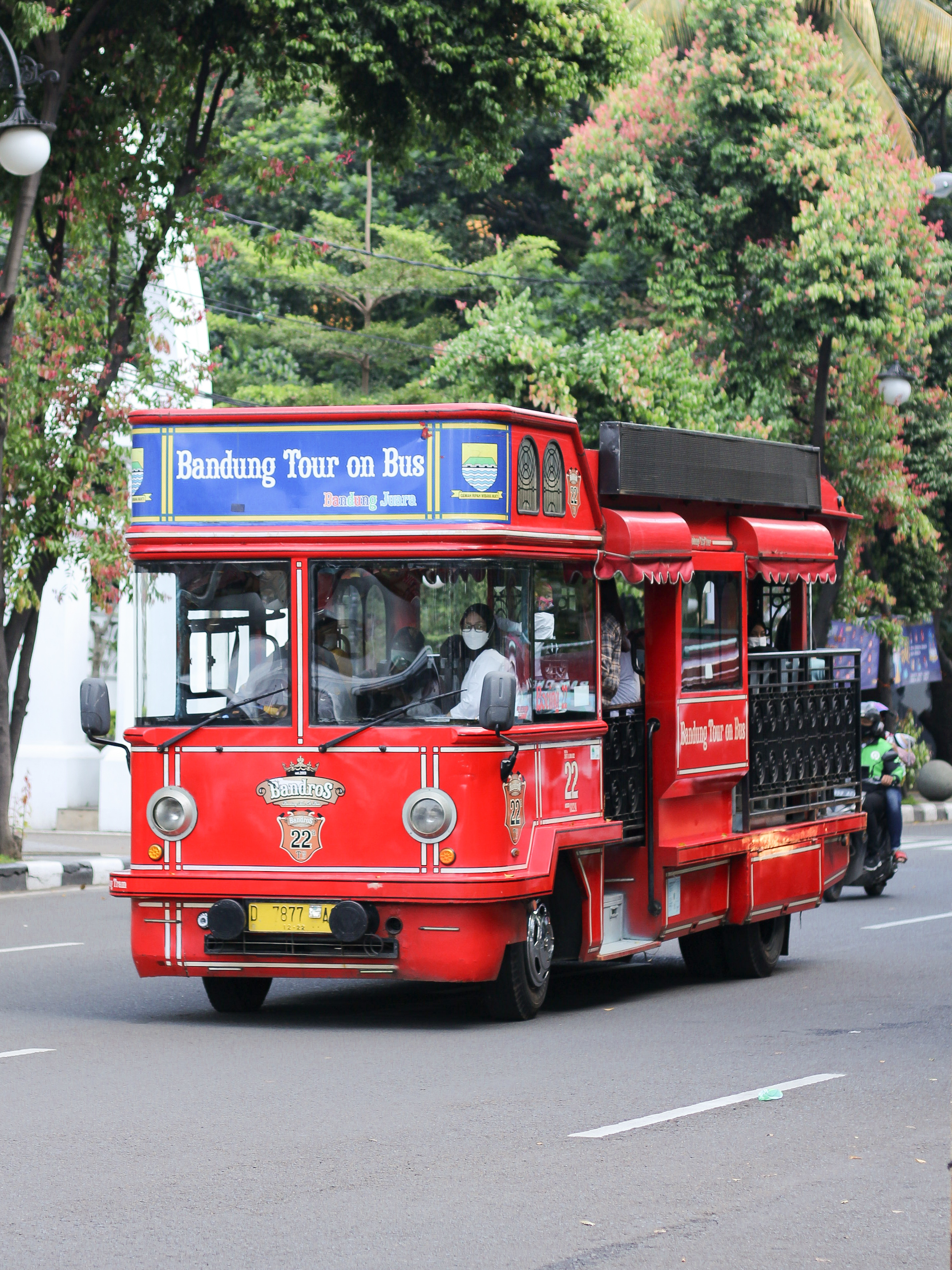
A bandros bus

Bandros or Bandung Tour Bus is a tour bus which operates in Bandung, West Java, Indonesia. It is used by tourists in Bandung City. The bus was unveiled by the Mayor of Bandung, Ridwan Kamil, on New Year's Eve 2014, and on February 18, 2018 it was announced that a tour bus will serve the city's. A local tour leader will accompany tourists on the bus. Bandros is managed by two parties: the Department of Transportation in Bandung (which is associated with the Regional Revenue and Expenditures Budget) and Mang Dudung which forms part of Corporate Social Responsibility. Buses have a capacity of 22 people. There are six buses operated by the Corporate Social Responsibility division, and 12 buses operated by the Regional Revenue and Expenditures Budget which is managed by the BLUD UPT Angkutan Department of Transportation in Bandung.

== History ==
The existence of bandros as tour bus started with a plan of the Bandung City Mayor, Ridwan Kamil when he was a newly elected mayor in 2013, and to improve the tourism sector, which is one of wheel drive economic mainstay and Bandung. According to the plan, the bus will transit at each hotel to escort tourists to travel around the city of Bandung and its surroundings. In addition, the bus is designed with a comfortable and attractive, which is expected to reduce the use of private transportation so that it can reduce the congestion that occurs in the city

This plan is then received from the Telkomsel, willing to fund the first units of a tour bus in the city of Bandung through the Corporate Social Responsibility. In addition, the city government is also holding an open competition to name the tour bus through social networking Twitter. the competition was won by Erry Pamungkas who named this tour bus with BANDROS, which is stands for the Bandung Tour Bus. The name itself comes from the name bandros one of the typical foods Parahyangan so the name is increasingly making a tour bus in the city of Bandung interesting. Finally, on 31 December 2013, coinciding with the New Year's Eve 2014, the Mayor, Ridwan Kamil officially launched Bandung Tour Bus.

== Fares ==
Fares are relatively cheap, only Rp. 20,000 for one trip.

There are two payment methods:

- Cash (customers can pay using local currency, Rupiah)
- QRIS (Customers can pay by scanning the QR code using any supporting e-money payment app such as QRIS)

== Route ==
- From Alun - Alun Kota Bandung : Alun-alun Kota Bandung - Banceuy - Cikapundung - Braga - Suniaraja - Perintis Kemerdekaan - Wastukancana - LLRE Martadinata - Ir H Djuanda - Diponogoro - Citarum - Lombok - Aceh - Sumatera - Tamblong - Asia Afrika -Alun-alun Kota Bandung
- From Jalan Diponegoro : Jalan Diponogoro - Citarum - Lombok - Aceh - Sumatera - Tamblong - Asia Afrika - Alun-alun - Banceuy - Cikapundung - Braga - Suniaraja - Perintis Kemerdekaan - Wastukancana - LLRE Martadinata - Ir H Djuanda - Jalan Diponogoro

== Facilities ==
One of the facilities provided in the bus is a tool GPS so that tourists know where his position was. in addition to GPS, the bus is also equipped with a data center and information making it easier for tourists to access the ins and outs of the city of Bandung.

Physically, bandros has a length of 747 cm and 315 cm high and 210 cm wide. At the bottom level, there are a number of round seat and a lounger with a capacity of 20 passengers. The driver and conductor bandros be clothed with a special design that makes tourists are increasingly interested in using these buses.
