= Preman Pensiun =

2015 Indonesian drama television series

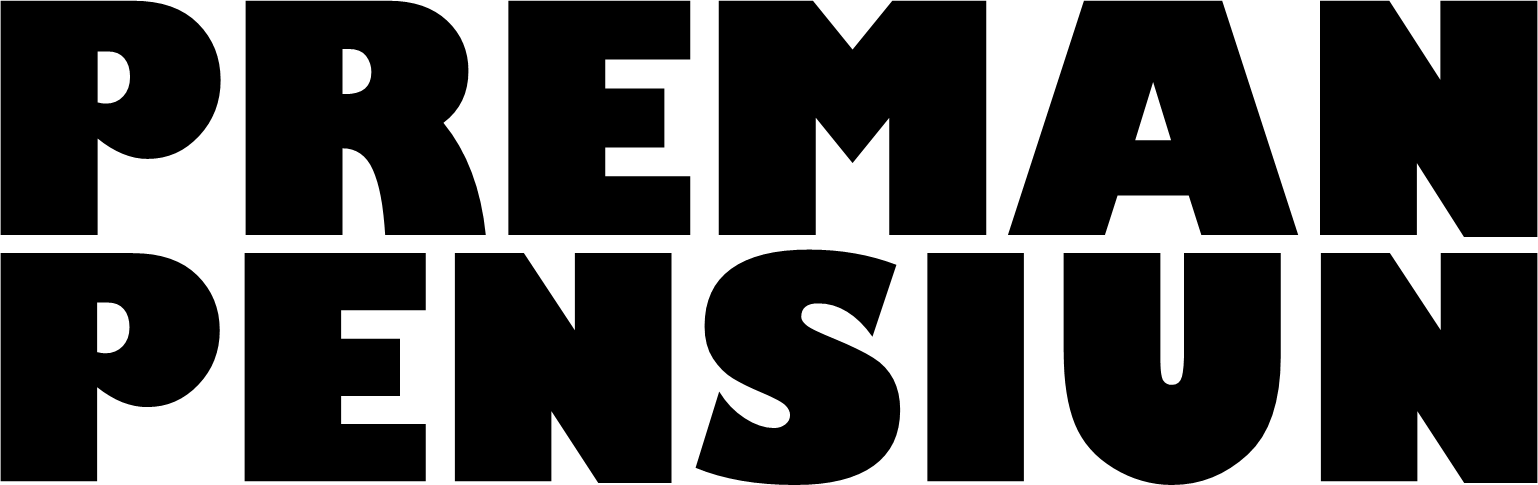
- Genre: Drama; Action; Comedy
- Created by: Aris Nugraha
- Screenplay by: Aris Nugraha
- Story by: Aris Nugraha
- Directed by: Aris Nugraha
- Starring: Didi Petet; Epy Kusnandar; Ikang Sulung; Mat Drajat; Roy Chunonk; Muhammad Jamasari; Andra Manihot; Fajar Khuto; Abenk Marco; Denny Firdaus; Ica Naga; Tya Arifin; Ike Muti; Sandi Tile; Soraya Rasyid; Claudia Andhara
- Opening theme: Preman Pensiun
- Ending theme: Preman Pensiun
- Composers: Danny Supit; Joseph S. Djafar
- Country of origin: Indonesia
- Original language: Indonesian
- No. of seasons: 10
- No. of episodes: 418

Production
- Executive producers: Hengki Irawan; Filrady Kusmara; Didi Ardiansyah; Debora Debby Wage; Kamil Wahyudi; Mudakir Rifai; Aris Nugraha
- Producers: Didi Ardiansyah; Reggi Djundjunan; Aris Nugraha
- Production location: Bandung
- Cinematography: Yaya Muzammil; Riski Dwi Panca
- Editors: Amrih Prayogi; Wahyono Giono; Andi Irawan; Ichsan Tripurwanto; Nilam Hamia; Uwah Syabilla; Ryono Prakasha; Rudicina; Seno Sendewo; Sigit; Heru Crespo; Kang Qomar; Ahmad Zaenuri; Tim Lukis; Robby Sunjaya; Wenny Shabrina; Yusuf Septianto
- Camera setup: Multi-camera
- Running time: 45–110 minutes
- Production company: MNC Pictures

Original release
- Network: RCTI
- Release: 12 January 2015 – 31 August 2025

Preman Pensiun (lit. 'Retired Thug') is an Indonesian television series produced by MNC Pictures which premiered on 12 January 2015 on RCTI. It starring Didi Petet, Epy Kusnandar and Mat Drajat. The story about the life of thugs in Bandung.

== Series overview ==
Season	First aired	Last aired	Episodes
1	12 January 2015	24 February 2015	36
2	25 May 2015	18 July 2015	46
3	14 December 2015	29 January 2016	38
4	24 April 2020	28 May 2020	33
5	13 April 2021	12 May 2021	32
6	21 August 2022	15 October 2022	41
7	17 October 2022	24 December 2022	33
8	23 March 2023	22 April 2023	31
9	27 February 2025	8 April 2025	39
10	31 May 2025	31 August 2025	89

== Plot ==
The series follows Bahar, a small-time thug who controls parts of Bandung, including Palasari Market and Cicaheum Terminal, while also protecting local street vendors. The story centres on the later period of his life as he prepares to retire, with dialogue between characters recounting his earlier years.

As a teenager in the early 1970s, Bahar migrated from Garut to Bandung because of his family's poverty. He made a living selling tofu, leupeut, and salted eggs on buses departing from the terminal. Frustrated by having to pay protection money to local thugs despite his modest earnings, he eventually decided to join their network. Using his martial arts skills and determination, Bahar gradually rose through the organisation. During his first decade in Bandung he became part of the existing power structure, and over the following twenty years he emerged as the dominant figure controlling activities around the streets, markets, and terminal.

Bahar's closest associate is Muslihat, a former amateur thief whom he met about twenty years earlier. After catching Muslihat stealing, Bahar learned that he had done so to pay for his mother's medical treatment and persuaded the police not to prosecute him. Bahar then gave Muslihat one million rupiah to help him return to his village. When Muslihat later returned the money after his mother had died, Bahar invited him to work with him. They remained close partners for the next two decades.

Muslihat later recruited Komar, a former busker from the terminal whom he had previously helped after Komar lost his guitar. Meanwhile, another pickpocket, Junaedi, forms his own group with Saep and Ubed as Bahar's network continues to expand. Jamal, the terminal owner, becomes involved in a violent incident in Dago and is arrested. Bahar and Muslihat allow him to remain in prison, prompting Jamal to seek revenge against Muslihat.

== Cast ==
- Didi Petet as Bahar: Khadijah's husband; Kinanti, Kinasih and Kirani's father
- Ridwan Ghany as Adit: Kinanti's friend
- Epy Kusnandar as Muslihat: Sukaesih's husband; Safira's father
- Fajar Khuto as Ujang Rambo
- Mat Drajat as Komar
- Dewi Novitasari as Dewi
- Diza Hanifa Hernawan as Diza
- Ikang Sulung as Jamal
- Tya Arifin as Kinanti: Bahar and Khadijah's daughter
- Anzanie Kamilah as Kirani: Bahar and Khadijah's daughter; Sudirman's wife
- Roy Chunonk as Maman Suherman
- Ike Muti as Khadijah: Bahar's wife; Kinanti, Kinasih and Kirani's mother
- Sindy Lasmana as Kinasih: Bahar and Khadijah's daughter; Bakti's wife
- Sandi Tile as Amin
- Soraya Rasyid as Imas: Dikdik's wife
- Dedi Mochamad Jamasari as Gobang
- Andra Manihot as Dikdik: Imas's husband
- Abenk Marco as Cecep
- Ilham Maizha Fadly as Iwan
- Vina Ferina as Sukaesih: Muslihat's wife; Safira's mother; Isye's daughter
- Denny Firdaus as Murad
- Ica Naga as Firmansyah "Pipit" Pitra
- Yusuf Herdiana as Mang UU
- Dicky Satria as Jupri
- Kristiano Purwo as Bohim
- Pangeran Tyson as Jony
- Fuad Idris as Idris: Bahar's bestfriend
- Isye Sumarni as Isye: Sukaesih's mother
- Nining Yuningsih as Edoh: Muslihat's maid
- Safira Maharani Farsya as Safira: Muslihat and Sukaesih's daughter
- Icuk Baros as Saep
- Ucup Palentin as Ubed
- Nendi Nurdin as Junaedi
- Eza Yayang as Rojak
- Furry Setya as Purnomo: Rojak's friend
- Andri Sulistiandri as Tisna: Yuli's husband; Rojak's friend
- Fitri Ayu as Yuli: Tisna's wife
- Ahmad Satiri as Sodik
- Asep Sunarya as Udin
- Tora Sudiro as Opik: Rojak's friend
- Mutiara Dea as Dea
- Aditya Pratama as Arman
- Ade Herman as Deden
- Birgitha Putri as Putri
- Melga Septrida as Bubun
- Yoshua Thomas as Taslim
- Enco Ruhayat as Darman
- Angelica Simperler as Silvia: Serena's bestfriend
- Dian Karyana as Willy
- Kiki Kinanti as Serena
- Delisa Herlina as Mira
- Achmad Safaat as Gugum
- Janis Kareem Aneira as Aisyah: Murad's daughter
- Eben as Boris
- Reza Muzaqir as Aloy
- Rifky Setia Mulyadi as Toni
- Irvan Baihaqi as Boy
- Arey as Acai
- Yuli Yumiati as Yayah
- Iky Kuncluk as Deni
- Adon as Otang
- Epud Syaputra as Jack
- Kinoy as Iding
- Bella Romadhan as Fitri: Iding's wife
- Astra Amadea as Susi Susanti
- Josalim as Darsa
- Ovita Vivi Yuniar as Renita
- Ribka Uli as Nina
- Kania Dewi as Intan
- Clara Kharisma as Madona: Ubed's wife
- Eko Oray as Mawardi
- Uki Sutisna as Ajun
- Andri Rahmat as Sukanta
- Nandi Juliawan as Encuy
- Denrick as Emen
- Diki Tatto as Aos
- Ghina Kamilla as Risa
- Regina Alya as Amy
- Salsa as Marina
- Zidny Fulki as Shinta
- Riesca Rosiana as Lolita
- Robi Rock as Wawan
- Farikha Safira asbRatih
- Aulia Yasmin as Yasmin
- Ivan Rivky Kabira as Edi Stanzah S. Kus
- Dimas Febriana as Didu
- Angga Frisyandi as Didan
- Dadan Rustian as Agus Supriyatna
- Handi Setiana as Yayat Hidayat
- Zaenal Abidin as Remon
- Harry Fauzi as Apit
- Ilham Faturahman as Budi
- Eno as Dewa
- Ronnie Imunx as Ebod
- Deny Wahyudi as Usep
- Agoy as Ibing
- Raezhaputra as Utar
- Adji Mulyadi as Oyon
- Dedi Uciel as Jimmy
- Putri Ziani as Irin
- Muhammad Shendy Ilham as Roy
- Yujeng as Enday
- Cep Tile as Udan
- Rheina Isabelle as Regina
- Inka Putri Pratiwi as Feni
- Jessica Fania as Lidya
- Bagus Ogah as Ook
- Dihaw Ableh as Abdurahman "Ableh" Saleh
- Rachquel Nesia as Nikita
- Claudia Andhara as Indah

=== Special appearances ===
- Ridwan Kamil as Ridwan
- Djadjang Nurdjaman as Jajang
