= 2013 Bandung mayoral election =

- 23 June 2013
- Turnout: 57.85%
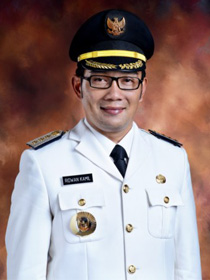

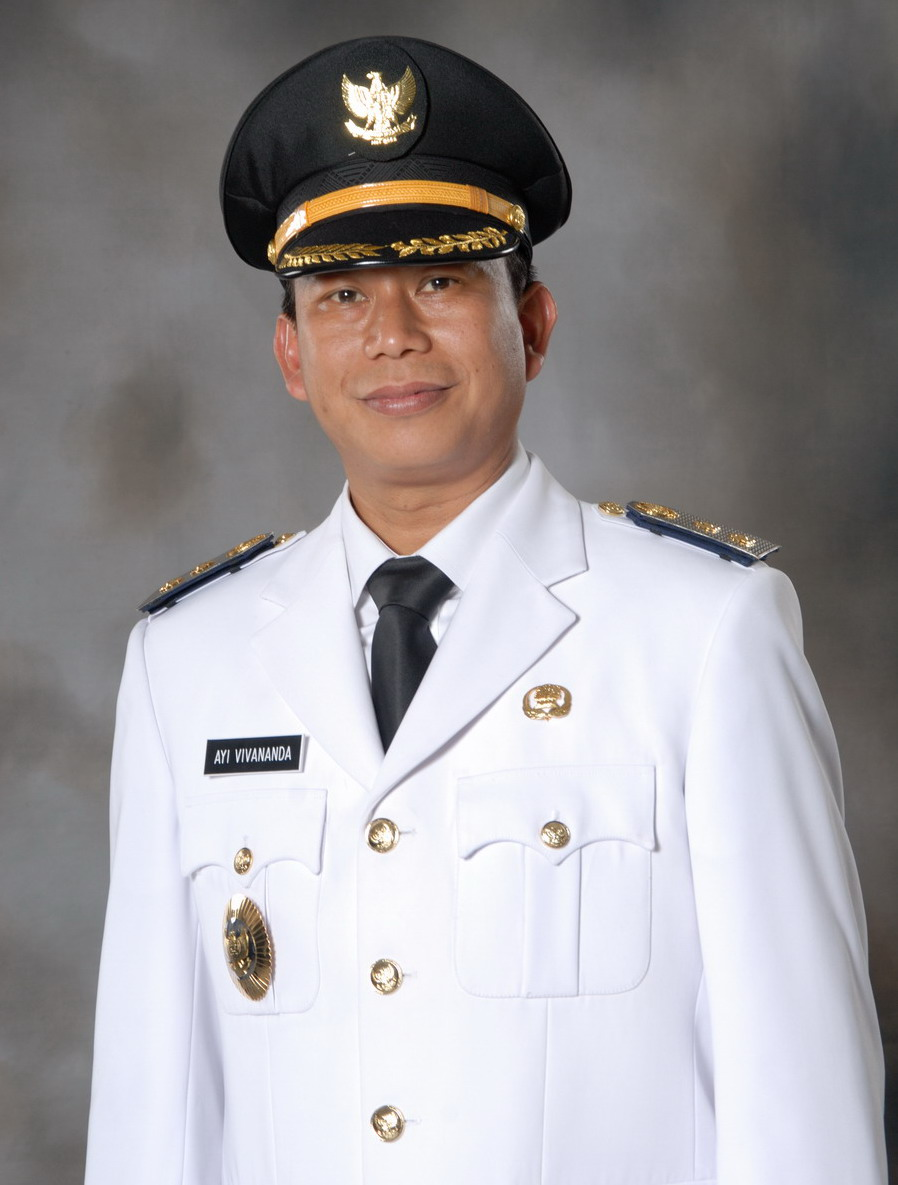
| Nominee | Ridwan Kamil | Edi Siswadi | Ayi Vivananda |
| Party | Independent | Demokrat | PDI-P |
| Running mate | Oded M. Danial | Erwan Setiawan | Nani Rosada |
| Popular vote | 434,130 | 169,526 | 145,513 |
| Percentage | 45.24% | 17.67% | 15.16% |
Mayor before election
Dada Rosada
Demokrat
Elected mayor
Ridwan Kamil
Independent

A mayoral election was held in Bandung on 23 June 2013, in order to elect the mayor of Bandung for a five-year term between 2013 and 2018. It was the second direct mayoral election in the city's history. Eight candidates vied for the mayoral seat, four of which are not backed by any political parties. Incumbent mayor Dada Rosada did not participate, having served two full terms as mayor.

The election followed a first past the post system, in which the winner might have only a plurality of the votes. Architect Ridwan Kamil won the election with about 45 percent of the votes - over double the nearest competitor.

== Candidates ==
| Ballot number | Candidate | Running mate | Supporting parties |
|---|---|---|---|
| 1 | Edi Siswadi | Erwan Setiawan | Demokrat; Hanura; PKB; PPP; 5 non-DPR parties |
| 2 | Wahyudin | Tonny Aprilani | Independent |
| 3 | Wawan Dewanta | M Sayogo | Independent |
| 4 | Ridwan Kamil | Oded M Danial | Gerindra; PKS |
| 5 | Ayi Vivananda | Nani Suryani | PDI-P; PAN |
| 6 | MA Iswara | Asep Dedy | Golkar; 16 non-DPR parties |
| 7 | Budi Setiawan | Rizal Firdaus | Independent |
| 8 | Bambang Setidadi | Alex Tahsin | Independent |

== Timeline ==
Independent candidates were required to submit proof of popular support between 10 and 14 February 2013, with party-backed candidates being allocated a week between 11 and 17 March in order to register. The campaign period was officially set to be between 6 and 19 June, with the voting process taking place on 23 June.

There were 4,119 ballot locations accommodating 1,658,808 eligible voters. According to Law No. 12 of 2008 on regional governance, a second-round election is required if the winning candidate earns less than 30 percent of the votes. If that was the case, the second round voting would be held on 24 August, with the final winner being officially made mayor on 16 September.

== Issues ==
Due to rapid urbanization, Bandung encountered problems such as economic and social inequality, corruption, traffic jams and environmental degradation. The candidates held a public debate in June, during which multiple incidents of provocative speech was done by supporters. Following the debates, an observer from Padjadjaran University remarked that "only two pairs are actually qualified to lead Bandung" and that the others were just "trying their luck", although he did not specify which.

== Results ==
Early exit polls were in favor of Ridwan-Oded's victory, with a turnout of about 57 percent. Chief of the local KPU noted the low turnout, stating that he was "disappointed".

| No | Candidate - Running mate | Votes | % |
|---|---|---|---|
| 1 | Edi-Erwan | 169,526 | 17.67 |
| 2 | Wahyudin-Tonny | 79,728 | 8.31 |
| 3 | Wawan-Sayogo | 17,901 | 1.87 |
| 4 | Ridwan-Oded | 434,130 | 45.24 |
| 5 | Ayi-Nani | 145,513 | 15.16 |
| 6 | Iswara-Asep | 73,617 | 7.67 |
| 7 | Budi-Rizal | 26,064 | 2.72 |
| 8 | Bambang-Alex | 13,168 | 1.37 |
| Total votes | | 959,647 | 100% |
| Turnout | | | 57.85% |

There were also 43,494 votes which were invalidated due to the ballot paper not being used or used more than once. On 28 June, Ridwan Kamil-Oded M Danial were declared winners of the election, having won in all 30 subdistricts (kecamatan) of the city. Following the announcement, six of the seven other candidate pairs (i.e. all except Iswara-Asep) objected to the result, citing irregularities in the election process. The objections were raised to the Constitutional Court on 2 July, and on 23 July the court upheld the election results. Ridwan was formally sworn in as mayor on 16 September, as scheduled.

=== Analysis ===
Observers noted the presence of Ridwan Kamil and his campaign team on social media, especially Twitter, as a contributing factor to his victory. Other candidates were also associated with corruption cases. Despite PKS being embroiled in a scandal during the election period, Ridwan's strong figure was postulated to have overshadowed this.
