= Nasri Cheppy =

- Born: October 16, 1950
- Died: December 18, 2010 (aged 60)
- Years active: 1984 - 2010

Nasri Cheppy (16 October 1950 – 18 December 2010) was an Indonesian film director. He directed the six film Catatan si boy action drama series in the late 1980s and early 1990s. In 2003 he directed the hit Eiffel I'm in Love. He is also credited as a screenwriter having written for films such as Demi cinta belahlah dadaku in 1991.

== Filmography ==
=== As director ===
- Ranjau-ranjau cinta (1984)
- Catatan si boy (1987)
- Bilur-bilur penyesalan (1987)
- Catatan si boy 2 (1988)
- Catatan si boy 4 (1990)
- Catatan si boy 3 (1990)
- Demi cinta belahlah dadaku (1991)
- Catatan si Emon (1991)
- Catatan si boy 5 (1991)
- Eiffel I'm in Love (2003)

=== As screenwriter ===
- Bilur-bilur penyesalan (1987)
- Demi cinta belahlah dadaku (1991)

== External links and sources ==
- Nasri Cheppy at IMDb
