= Didi Petet =

Indonesian actor (1956–2015)

- Born: July 12, 1956; Surabaya, Indonesia
- Died: May 15, 2015 (aged 58); Jakarta, Indonesia
- Years active: 1987–2015

Didi Petet (July 12, 1956 – May 15, 2015), born Didi Widiatmoko, was an Indonesian actor and film director best known for starring as Emon in the Catatan Si Boy series of films in the late 1980s and early 1990s.

== Death ==
Didi Petet died on May 15, 2015, at approximately 03:00. His death was caused by stomach acid after he carry out Tahajjud prayer.

== Filmography ==
- Catatan Si Boy (1987) ... Emon
- Catatan Si Boy 2 (1988) ... Emon
- Bayar Tapi Nyicil (1988) ... Emon
- Pacar Ketinggalan Kereta (1989)
- Joe Turun ke Desa (1989) ... Joe
- Rebo & Robby (1990)
- Catatan Si Boy 3 (1990) ... Emon
- Si Kabayan dan Anak Jin (1991)
- Gema Kampus 66 (1991)
- Catatan Si Emon (1991) ... Emon
- Catatan Si Boy 5 (1991) ... Emon
- Asmara (1992)
- Si Kabayan Mencari Jodoh (1994) ... Kabayan
- Petualangan Sherina (2000) ... Ardiwilaga
- Pasir Berbisik (2001) ... Suwito
- Eiffel I'm in Love (2003)
- Rindu Kami Padamu (2004) ... Pak Guru
- Tentang Dia (2005) ... Pak Dibyo
- Banyu Biru (2005) ... Wahyu
- Apa Artinya Cinta (2005) ... Om Sudiro
- D'Girlz Begins (2006)
- Kamulah Satu-Satunya (2007)
- Di Bawah Lindungan Ka'bah (2011)
- Preman Pensiun (2015) - RCTI

== Awards and nominations ==
Year	Award	Category	Recipients	Result
1988	Indonesian Film Festival	Citra Award for Best Supporting Actor	Cinta Anak Jaman	Won
1990	Indonesian Film Festival	Citra Award for Best Leading Actor	Joe Turun ke Desa	Nominated
1991	Indonesian Film Festival	Citra Award for Best Leading Actor	Boneka dari Indiana	Nominated
2005	MTV Indonesia Movie Awards	Most Favorite Supporting Actor	Banyu Biru	Nominated
2013	Indonesian Film Festival	Citra Award for Best Supporting Actor	Madre	Nominated
2013	Maya Award	Best Actor in a Supporting Role	Madre	Nominated
