= Semarang City Regional House of Representatives =

Municipal legislature of the city of Semarang, Central Java, Indonesia

Coordinates: 06°58′54″S 110°24′47″E

Semarang City Regional House of Representatives Dewan Perwakilan Rakyat Daerah Kota Semarang
- 2024–2029 period
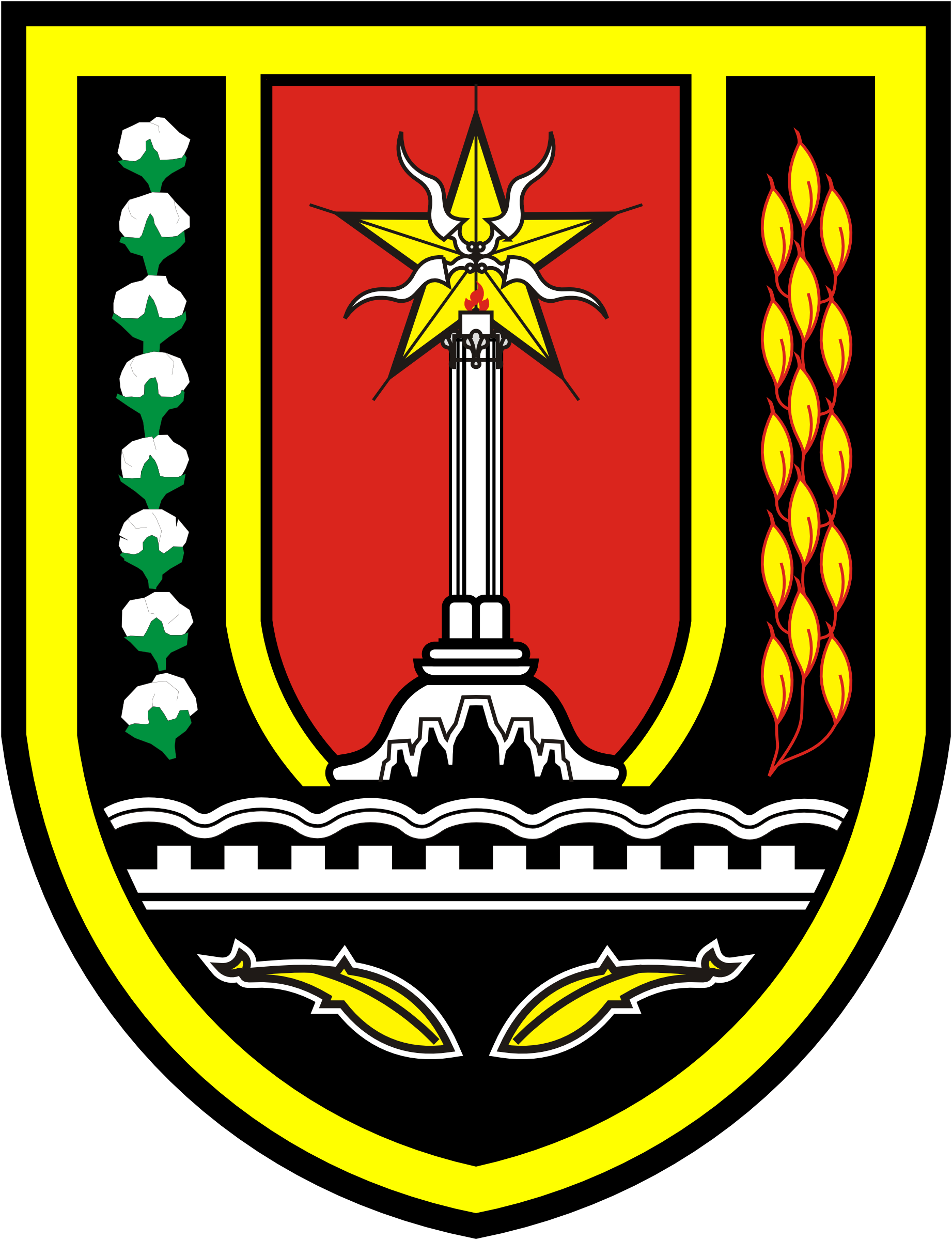

Type
- Type: Unicameral

History
- Established: 7 December 1950; 75 years ago (as Provisional Semarang City Regional House of Representatives); 1957; 69 years ago (as Semarang City Regional House of Representatives)
- Preceded by: Gemeenteraad Semarang
- New session started: 15 October 2024

Leadership
- Speaker: Kadar Lusman, PDI-P since 14 August 2024
- Deputy Speaker: Dyah Tunjung Pudiyawati, Gerindra since 14 August 2024
- Deputy Speaker: Suharsono, PKS since 15 October 2024
- Deputy Speaker: Wahyoe Winarto, Democratic since 15 October 2024

Structure
- Seats: 50
- Political groups: Government (14): PDI-P (14); Opposition (36): Gerindra (7); PKS (6); Democratic (6); PKB (5); PSI (5); Golkar (4); PAN (1); NasDem (1); PPP (1)

Elections
- Voting system: Open list proportional representation
- First general election: 1957
- Last general election: 14 February 2024
- Next general election: 2031

Meeting place
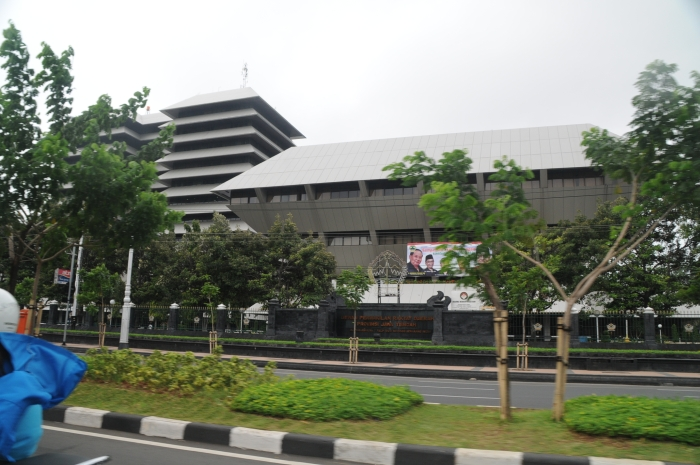
- Sekayu, Central Semarang, Semarang, Central Java, Indonesia

Website
- dprd.semarangkota.go.id

The Semarang City Regional House of Representatives is the unicameral municipal legislature of the city of Semarang, Central Java, Indonesia. It has 50 members, who are elected every five years, simultaneously with the national legislative election.

== History ==
Semarang was granted city status (Gemeente) during the Dutch East Indies period on 1 April 1906, and a city council (gemeenteraad) comprising 23 members was formed. Together with the city councils of Surabaya and Bandung, Semarang's city council was the first in the Dutch East Indies to have elected women as councillors in 1938. During the Japanese occupation of the Dutch East Indies, the city government was abolished, although a 20-member advisory council was formed to support the Japanese military administrator.

After the end of the revolution, a provisional regional house of representatives (DPRDS) was formed in 1950 with 34 members who were selected by a 165-member committee led by the city's mayor Koesbiyono. The 1950 DPRDS included 13 members of political parties, 7 members of labor unions, with other councillors representing other organisations. The Indonesian Communist Party (PKI) held a majority in the city council following the 1955 general election and 1957 local elections. The other political parties – the Indonesian National Party, Masyumi, and Nahdlatul Ulama – boycotted the council after PKI legislators elected a PKI mayor in 1957. Following the transition to the New Order, Semarang's legislative election starting in 1971 like other cities was dominated by Golkar. PDI-P became the biggest party in the council after the fall of Suharto in the 1999 election, with 20 PDI-P councillors.

The legislative building is shared with the mayoral office, in a Greco-Roman style building which was formerly used as a Dutch villa.

== Composition ==
For the 2024 election, 50 members were elected to the council, with 6 electoral districts. The current speaker is Kadar Lusman of PDI-P, who was sworn in on 13 September 2019.

| Legislative period | PDI-P | Gerindra | PKS | Demokrat | PKB | PSI | Golkar | PAN | Nasdem | PPP | Hanura | Total |
| 2009–2014 | 9 | 4 | 6 | 16 | 2 | | 5 | 6 | | 1 | 1 | 50 |
| 2014–2019 | 15 | 7 | 6 | 6 | 4 | | 5 | 4 | 1 | 2 | – | 50 |
| 2019–2024 | 19 | 6 | 6 | 6 | 4 | 2 | 3 | 2 | 2 | – | | 50 |
| 2024–2029 | 14 | 7 | 6 | 6 | 5 | 5 | 4 | 1 | 1 | 1 | – | 50 |
