= Al-Jabbar Grand Mosque =

Mosque in Bandung, West Java, Indonesia

- Masjid Raya Al Jabbar

- Location within Bandung

Religion
- Affiliation: Islam
- Branch/tradition: Sunni

Location
- Location: Bandung, Indonesia
- Interactive map of Al-Jabbar Grand Mosque
- Administration: West Java Provincial Government
- Coordinates: 6°56′53″S 107°42′13″E

Architecture
- Architect: Ridwan Kamil
- Type: Mosque
- Style: Neo-futurism, Ottoman, Sundanese
- Groundbreaking: 29 December 2017
- Completed: 30 December 2022
- Construction cost: Rp 1 trillion (US$ 64 million)

Specifications
- Capacity: 60,000
- Dome: 1
- Minaret: 4
- Minaret height: 99 m (325 ft)

Website
- masjidrayaaljabbar.com

Al-Jabbar Grand Mosque (Indonesian: Masjid Raya Al Jabbar) is a mosque located in Bandung, West Java, Indonesia. Because it is surrounded by a reservoir, the mosque is sometimes referred to as the Al Jabbar Floating Mosque. The mosque is situated in the Gedebage district in eastern Bandung.

Al-Jabbar, meaning The Compeller in Arabic, is one of the 99 names of Allah. "Aljabar" is the Indonesian word for algebra, which was founded by a Muslim. Coincidentally, "Jabar" is also an acronym for Jawa Barat and a nickname for the province of West Java; thus, the name Masjid Al Jabbar or Al Jabar can also be translated as "Mosque in West Java" or "West Java Mosque".

== History ==
=== Background ===
In the past, the Gedebage area was a swamp called Muras Geger Hanjuang. These swamps are the remnants of the Ancient Bandung Lake. At the end of the 19th century, these swamps began to dry up and become rice fields. The state railway company, Staatsspoorwegen (SS), built a railway connecting Bandung and Cicalengka in the middle of these swamps. Gedebage became a sub-district after the city of Bandung was divided in 2006. This expansion made this area lively because people started building new housing there.

=== Construction ===
Construction of the mosque started on 29, December, 2017. Ex-governor Ahmad Heryawan and ex-vice governor Deddy Mizwar performed the ground breaking ceremony and laid the first stone to officially begin construction of the mosque. Due to the COVID-19 pandemic, construction was halted in 2020 and was later resumed one and a half years later on 24 August 2021. After 5 years of construction, the mosque was officially inaugurated on 30 December 2022 by Governor Ridwan Kamil.

== Specifications ==
The Mosque covers a total area of 21,799,20 square meters. It has a ground floor that covers an area of 11,238.20 square meters, the first floor has an area of 8,329 square meters, and the mezzanine floor has an area of 2,232 square meters. Meanwhile, the area devoted to lakes and reservoirs is 6,930 hectares, and the area devoted to parking lots, plazas, and green spaces is 11,163 hectares.

The prayer chambers can accommodate 9,822 people on the first floor, 3,188 on the mezzanine floor, 3,627 in the halls, and 16,363 on the courtyard. In total it can fit 33,000 people.

The mosque contains four 99-meter-tall minarets, one in each of its four corners. 6,136 sheets of glass are designed to mimic fish scales that make up the facade and dome. There are 27 entrances to the mosque, representing the 27 cities or regencies of West Java. On each of these entrances there is a batik motif which is native to each of the cities or regencies. Turkish-woven carpets are used for the floors of the mosque.

Given that the mosque is situated in the flood-prone district of Gedebage, it is surrounded by a 6.9 hectare reservoir that can absorb water during floods. The mosque has a garden and a museum dedicated to Islam.

== Gallery ==
One of the minarets of the mosque

Close up view of the back facade

Interior of Al-Jabbar Mosque

In Front of Al-Jabbar Grand Mosque facade, December 2025
