= Demi Cinta Belahlah Dadaku =

Demi cinta belahlah dadaku
- Directed by: Nasri Cheppy
- Written by: Nasri Cheppy
- Cinematography: Suryo Susanto
- Distributed by: PT Pangkalan Menanti Film
- Release date: 1991
- Country: Indonesia
- Language: Indonesian

Demi cinta belahlah dadaku is a 1991 Indonesian drama film directed by Nasri Cheppy.

== Cast ==
- Nurul Arifin as Halimah
- Imuda as Sam
- Ade Irawan
- Alex Manopo
- W.D. Mochtar
- Hari Mukti
- Tile
