= Aa Tarmana =

Indonesian mayor

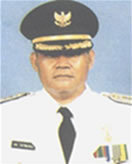

13th Mayor of Bandung
- In office 16 October 1998 – 16 October 2003
- Preceded by: Wahyu Hamijaya
- Succeeded by: Dada Rosada

Aa Tarmana was the mayor of Bandung from 1998 to 2003. He was the front-runner for a reelection, but overnight the second-level parliament elected Dada Rosada instead.

Tarmana was a colonel in the Indonesian Army and he was known for his military-style leadership. His time as mayor also involved him supporting street vendors with tents, in contrast with his predecessor and successor who attempted to relocate them.
