= Catatan Si Boy: The Series =

Indonesian television series

- Based on: Characters by Nasri Cheppy
- Directed by: Awi Suryadi
- Starring: Achmad Megantara; Marsha Aruan; Zidni Hakim; Kresna Julio; Hana Prinantina
- Theme music composer: Youngky Soewarno & Deddy Dhukun
- Opening theme: Terserah Boy (performed by Soundwave)
- Country of origin: Indonesia
- No. of episodes: 24

Original release
- Network: NET.
- Release: September 10, 2016 – March 21, 2017

Catatan Si Boy: The Series is a 2016 television series serving as a remake of the 1987's film of the same name. The series premiered on September 10, 2016, on NET.

== Characters ==
=== Main ===
- Boy (played by Achmad Megantara)
- Ina (played by Marsha Aruan) - Boy's younger sister
- Andi/Kendi (played by Zidni Hakim) - Boy's childhood friend
- Emon (played by Kresna Julio) - Boy & Ina's best friend
- Nuke (played by Hana Prinantina) - Boy's love interest

=== Recurring ===
- Pak Sahid (played by Leroy Osmani) - Boy & Ina's father
- Bu Sahid (played by Lydia Kandou) - Boy & Ina's mother
- Vera (played by Melayu Nicole)
- Shasha (played by Westny Dj)
- Ocha (played by Putri Anne)
- Ambar (played by Yova Gracia)
