= Oded Muhammad Danial =

Indonesian politician (1962–2021)

Oded Mohamad Danial
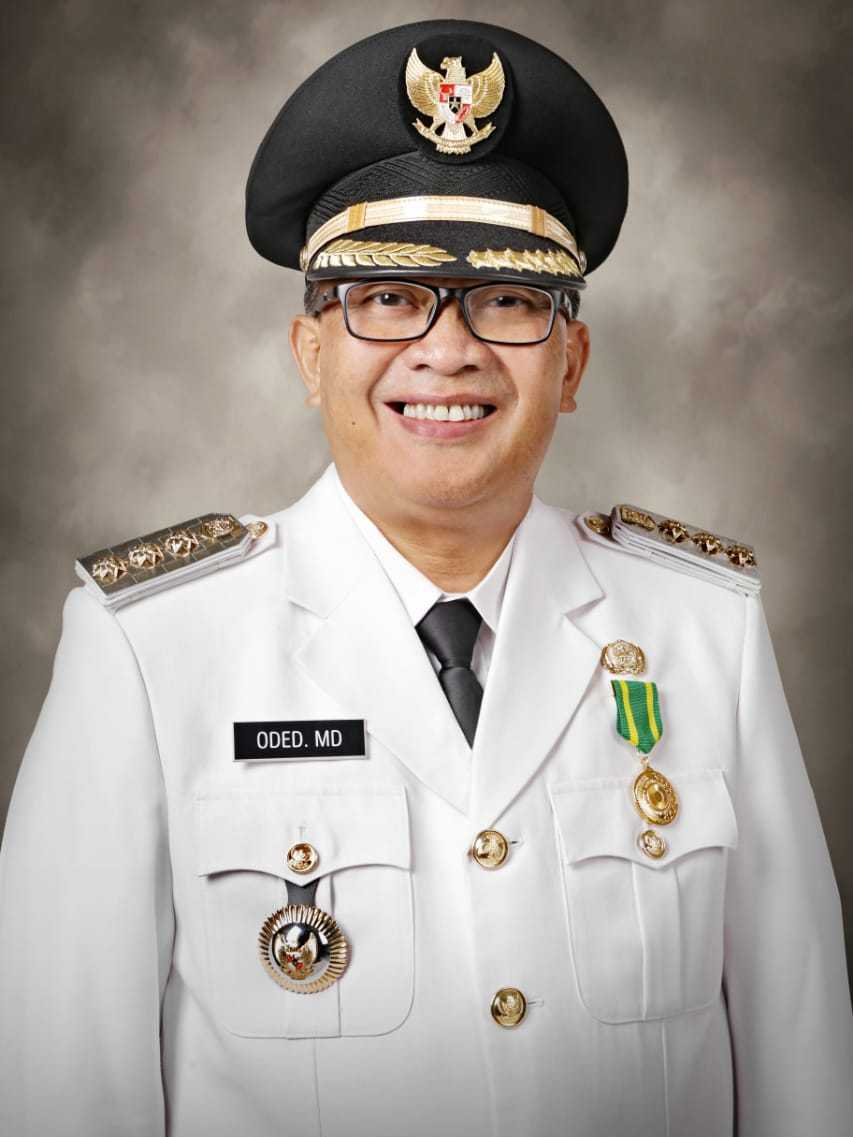

16th Mayor of Bandung
- In office 20 September 2018 – 10 December 2021; Acting: 6–16 September 2018
- Deputy: Yana Mulyana
- Preceded by: Ridwan Kamil
- Succeeded by: Yana Mulyana

6th Vice Mayor of Bandung
- In office 16 September 2013 – 16 September 2018
- Mayor: Ridwan Kamil
- Preceded by: Ayi Vivananda
- Succeeded by: Yana Mulyana

Member of Bandung City Council
- In office 2004–2013

Personal details
- Born: 15 November 1962 Tasikmalaya, West Java, Indonesia
- Died: 10 December 2021 (aged 59) Bandung, West Java, Indonesia
- Political party: Prosperous Justice Party

Oded Mohamad Danial (15 November 1962 – 10 December 2021) was an Indonesian politician who served as mayor of Bandung from 2018 until his death in 2021. He had previously served as the deputy mayor of Ridwan Kamil, and a city councilor before that.

Originating from Tasikmalaya, he had worked at Indonesian Aerospace before starting his own business. After entering politics as part of the Prosperous Justice Party, he eventually became the mayor of Bandung after winning the 2018 mayoral election.

== Background ==
Oded was born on 15 November 1962 in Tasikmalaya Regency, where he completed his basic education. He went to SMK Tasikmalaya vocational school for his high school. Later on, he studied at Universitas Pasundan, graduating in 2017.

== Career ==
=== Business ===
After graduating in 1983 Oded worked at Indonesian Aerospace – at the spare parts division – for 16 years until 1999, when the company laid off most of its employees. Oded employed tailors in manufacturing baby clothing and Islamic dresses, in addition to selling ice cream from his own home until 2016.

=== Politics ===
He was elected to Bandung's City Council in 2004 and 2009, in which he had been the deputy chairman of the B commission. In 2013, however, he participated in the mayoral election as architect Ridwan Kamil's running mate, and the pair won with 45.24 percent of the vote. As Kamil's deputy, he established a "Dakwah on the Bus" program, which involved religious speeches on buses.

He also headed the Bandung office of the Prosperous Justice Party between 2010 and 2015.

Oded ran as a mayoral candidate in 2018, winning a slim majority (50.1 percent) in the three-candidate race. Following Kamil's victory in the gubernatorial election, Oded became acting mayor briefly starting on 6 September 2018. His term as deputy ended on 16 September 2018, although just several days later he was sworn in as Bandung's mayor by Kamil.

As mayor, Oded initiated a garbage management program which promoted the slogan "reduce, separate, utilize" to reduce the quantity of trash generated by the city. An urban farming program was also launched, converting empty residential plots into gardens. The COVID-19 pandemic struck the city during his tenure, and the municipal government shifted its focus to handling the outbreaks. Oded himself tested positive for COVID-19 in January 2021.

== Family and death ==
Oded had married twice. After his first wife died, he married Siti Muntamah, who in 2019 was elected as a member of the West Java Regional House of Representatives. The couple has seven daughters.

Oded died on 10 December 2021. He had suddenly collapsed prior to giving a Friday prayer sermon, and was pronounced dead at the hospital. He was buried at night the same day in Tasikmalaya next to his parents' graves.
