= Bandung City Regional House of Representatives =

Municipal legislature of the city of Bandung, West Java, Indonesia

Bandung City Regional House of Representatives Dewan Perwakilan Rakyat Daerah Kota Bandung
- 2024–2029 period
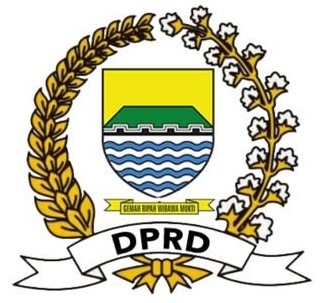

Type
- Type: Unicameral

Leadership
- Speaker: Asep Mulyadi, PKS since 24 September 2024
- Deputy Speaker: Toni Wijaya, Gerindra since 24 September 2024
- Deputy Speaker: Edwin Senjaya, Golkar since 24 September 2024
- Deputy Speaker: Rieke Suryaningsih, PDI-P since 24 September 2024

Structure
- Political groups: Government (11): NasDem (6); PKB (5); Confidence and supply (39): PKS (11); PDI-P (7); Golkar (7); Gerindra (7); PSI (4); Democratic (3)

Elections
- Voting system: Open list
- Last general election: 14 February 2024
- Next general election: 2029

Meeting place
- Bandung City Regional House of Representatives building Jl. Sukabumi No.30; Bandung, West Java, Indonesia

Website
- dprd.bandung.go.id

The Bandung City Regional House of Representatives (Indonesian: Dewan Perwakilan Rakyat Daerah Kota Bandung, Sundanese: ᮓᮦᮝᮔ᮪ ᮕᮀᮝᮊᮤᮜ᮪ ᮛᮠᮚᮒ᮪ ᮓᮆᮛᮂ ᮊᮧᮒ ᮘᮔ᮪ᮓᮥᮀ, romanized: Déwan Pangwakil Rahayat Daérah Kota Bandung, DPRD Kota Bandung) is the unicameral municipal legislature of the city of Bandung, West Java, Indonesia. It has 50 members, who are elected every five years, simultaneously with the national legislative election.

== History ==
A legislature for the city of Bandung was created upon its granting of urban municipality status (Gemeente) by the Dutch East Indies government on 1 April 1906. Upon its founding, the city council had eleven members, which was to include two Native Indonesians. The council was headed by the Assistant Resident. Later, the dedicated position of the mayor of Bandung was separated from the assistant resident, and the mayor led the city council. Together with the city councils of Surabaya and Semarang, Bandung's city council was the first in the Dutch East Indies to have elected women as councillors in 1938.

Following the Indonesian National Revolution, a Provisional Regional House of Representatives (Dewan Perwakilan Rakyat Daerah Sementara/DPRDS) was formed as the city's legislature, with 31 members representing 22 political parties and other organizations being sworn in on 1 October 1950. Within three months from its founding, the body had faced pressure from residents as its members were unelected, but it continued to sit until 1 July 1956 when provisional regional legislatures nationwide were disbanded to be replaced by elected legislators. Following the 1977 election, the legislature had 40 members, including 6 representatives of the armed forces. In the 2019 election, the legislature has 50 elected members.

During the Dutch colonial period, after initially being based out of a site of a former coffee packing factory, the city council moved to a purpose built city hall in 1927. The legislature continued to use the city hall following Indonesian independence, until it moved to a newer building in 2014.

== Composition ==
Legislators are elected from multi-member electoral districts, with 7 electoral districts in the 2024 election. Following the 2024 legislative election, the Prosperous Justice Party (PKS) became the largest party in the legislature with 11 members. The current speaker is Asep Mulyadi of PKS, serving since 24 September 2024.

Legislative period	PKS	Gerindra	Golkar	PDI-P	Nasdem	PKB	PSI	Demokrat	PPP	Hanura	PAN	PDS	PBB	Total
2004–2009	11		6	7		—		6	4		6	3	2	45
2009–2014	9	3	6	7		—		20	3		1	1	—	50
2014–2019	6	7	6	12	4	1		6	2	6	—			50
2019–2024	13	8	6	7	5	2	3	5	1	—				50
2024–2029	11	7	7	7	6	5	4	3	—					50
