= Catatan Si Boy =

Catatan si Boy
- Directed by: Nasri Cheppy
- Based on: Catatan si Boy by Prambors Rasisonia
- Starring: Didi Petet
- Cinematography: Harry Susanto
- Music by: Dodo Zakaria
- Distributed by: Bola Dunia Film
- Release date: 1987
- Running time: 92 minutes
- Country: Indonesia
- Language: Indonesian

Catatan Si Boy is a 1987 Indonesian action film drama directed by Nasri Cheppy and starring Didi Petet. The film, a success, spawned five sequels, as well as remake in 2016. The film was inspired by a popular radio drama show of the same name broadcast by Prambors Rasisonia from June 1985 to the late 80s. As with the radio show, Catatan Si Boy chronicled the life of the main character "Boy", the son of a very rich Indonesian family who owns a conglomerate of companies in many industries.

== Cast ==
- Didi Petet as Emon
- Onky Alexander as Boy
- Ayu Azhari as Nuke
- Meriam Bellina as Vera
- Faradina
- Leroy Osmani
- Kaharudin Syah
- Nani Widjaja
- Dede Yusuf as Andy
