= Nining Meida =

Indonesian pop singer (born 1965)

- Born: June 6, 1965 (age 60)
- Origin: Bandung, Indonesia
- Genres: dangdut, Sundanese pop
- Occupation: singer
- Instrument: Vocals
- Years active: 1986–present
- Label: Pronima Records

Nining Meida is an Indonesian pop singer who became popular in 1980s by singing the whole song in Sundanese-language. Her most famous album was Kalangkang (1986).

== Career ==
Meida started singing at the age of 13 and has produced dozens of albums.

In 1986, Kalangkang was released. This album has sold more than 1 million copies.

Her popular songs include Kalangkang (Shadow), which became a huge hit and is considered an archetype of Sundanese pop, and Situ Patenggang.

Meida also founded Promina Records in Bandung.
