= Ateng Wahyudi =

Indonesian politician

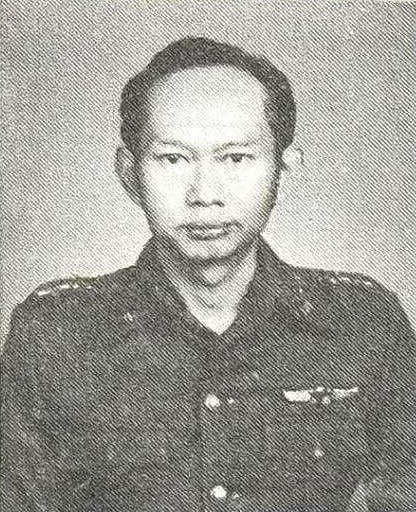

11th Mayor of Bandung
- In office 16 October 1983 – 16 October 1993
- Preceded by: Husen Wangsaatmadja
- Succeeded by: Wahyu Hamijaya

Personal details
- Born: 16 March 1936 Bandung, Dutch East Indies
- Died: 16 September 2009 (aged 73) Bandung, Indonesia

Ateng Wahyudi (16 March 1936 – 16 September 2009) was the mayor of Bandung, West Java, Indonesia. He was mayor between 1983 and 1993.
