= Yana Mulyana =

Indonesian politician

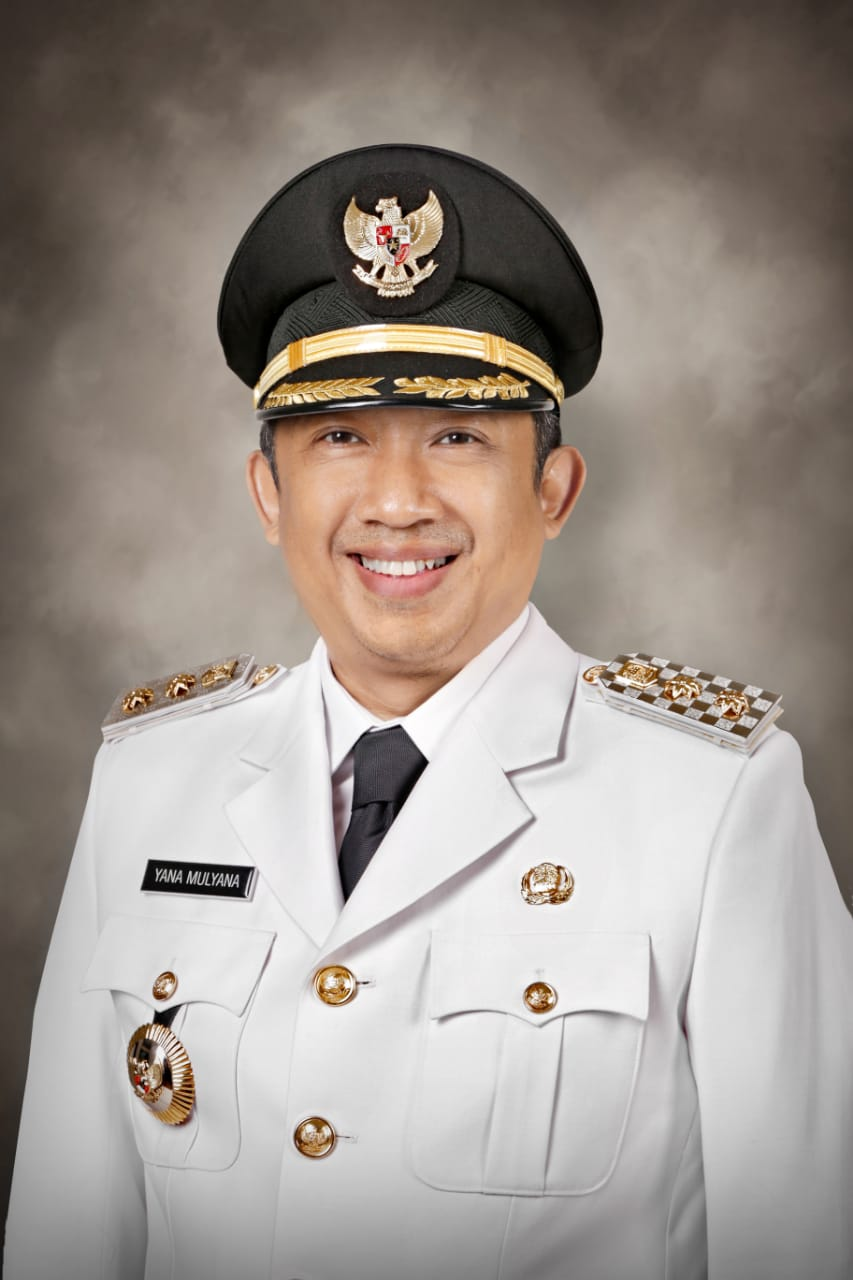

17th Mayor of Bandung
- In office 18 April 2022 – 15 April 2023; Acting: 10 December 2021 – 18 April 2022
- Deputy: Vacant
- Preceded by: Oded Muhammad Danial
- Succeeded by: Ema Sumarna (acting); Muhammad Farhan

6th Vice Mayor of Bandung
- In office 20 September 2018 – 10 December 2021
- Mayor: Oded Muhammad Danial
- Preceded by: Oded Muhammad Danial

Personal details
- Born: 17 February 1965 (age 61) Bandung, Indonesia
- Party: Gerindra
- Spouse: Yunimar
- Children: 2
- Education: Universitas Islam Nusantara
- Occupation: Entrepreneur, businessman, politician

Yana Mulyana (born 17 February 1965) is an entrepreneur, businessman, and politician who was the Mayor of Bandung, serving between 2022 and 2023 as a replacement for Oded Muhammad Danial.

Before he served as Vice Mayor of Bandung, Yana was an entrepreneur. He also owns a property business and several other business lines. He is also the founder of Radio Rase FM. Yana's work at Rase FM began in 1987 when he continued the licensing process for the establishment of Radio Rase, which had previously been delayed.

On 15 April 2023, he was arrested by the Corruption Eradication Commission under suspicions of corruption.

== Education ==
- SD Negeri Panorama
- SMP Negeri 15 Bandung
- SMA Negeri 5 Bandung
- Universitas Islam Nusantara
