= Dada Rosada =

Indonesian politician

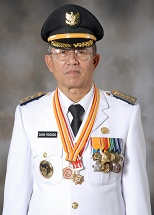

14th Mayor of Bandung
- In office 16 September 2003 – 16 September 2013
- Preceded by: Aa Tarmana
- Succeeded by: Ridwan Kamil

Personal details
- Born: 29 April 1947 (age 78) Bandung, Indonesia
- Occupation: Mayor

H. Dada Rosada (alternatively Kang Dada), is the former mayor of Bandung City, West Java, Indonesia.

In 2014, he was found guilty of corruption and was sentenced to 10 years in prison.
