= Ridwan Kamil =

Indonesian architect and politician (born 1971)

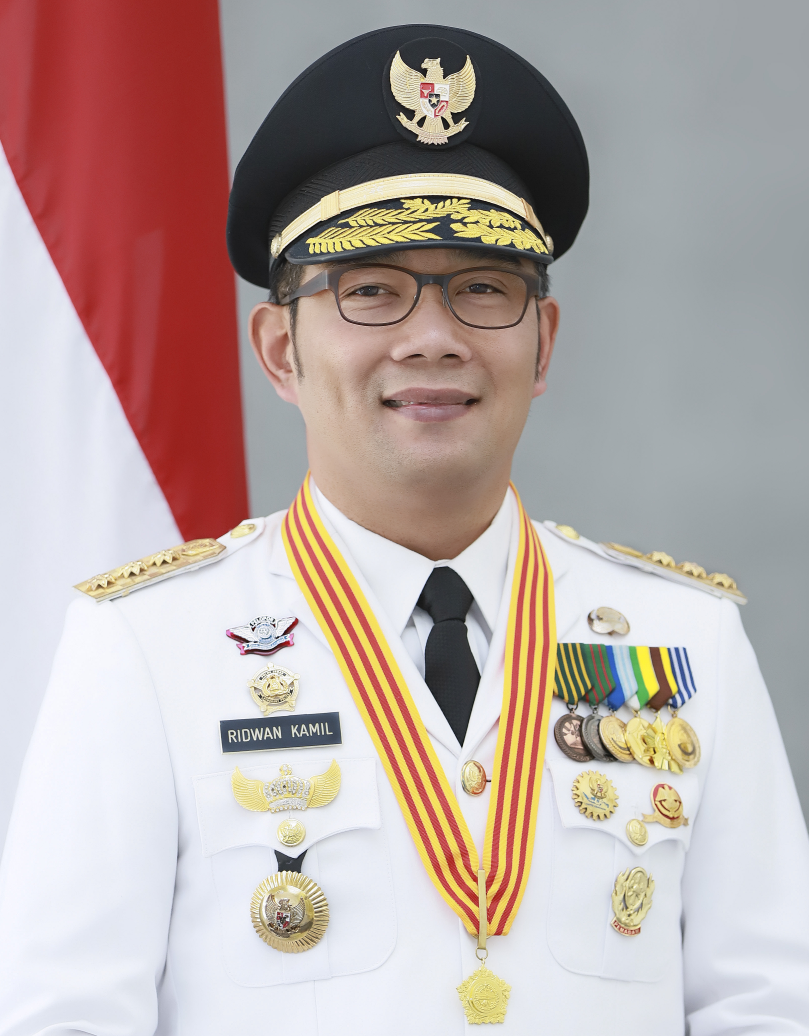
- Official portrait, 2018

14th Governor of West Java
- In office 5 September 2018 – 5 September 2023
- Deputy: Uu Ruzhanul Ulum
- Preceded by: Ahmad Heryawan; Mochamad Iriawan (acting)
- Succeeded by: Dedi Mulyadi; Bey Machmudin (acting)

15th Mayor of Bandung
- In office 16 September 2013 – 5 September 2018
- Deputy: Oded Muhammad Danial
- Preceded by: Dada Rosada
- Succeeded by: Oded Muhammad Danial

Personal details
- Born: Mochamad Ridwan Kamil; 4 October 1971 (age 54) Bandung, Indonesia
- Party: Golkar
- Other political affiliations: Independent (2012–2023)
- Spouse: Atalia Praratya (m. 1996; div. 2026)
- Children: 3 (2 biological, 1 adopted)
- Parents: Atje Misbach Muhjiddin (father); Tjutju Sukaesih (mother)
- Education: Bandung Institute of Technology (S.T.); University of California, Berkeley (MUD)
- Occupation: Politician; architect
- Nicknames: Kang Emil; RK

Mochamad Ridwan Kamil (born 4 October 1971), alternatively Kang Emil or RK, is an Indonesian architect and politician who was the 15th Governor of West Java, the largest (most populous) province of Indonesia. He was also the mayor of Bandung from 2013 to 2018. As an architect, he designed iconic structures in Indonesia and other countries in Asia with his Urbane architectural firm and lectured at the Department of Architecture, Bandung Institute of Technology.

== Personal life ==
Born in Bandung, Ridwan Kamil was the second child of an academic at Padjadjaran University, namely Atje Misbach Muhjiddin. He studied at SDN Banjarsari III Bandung between 1978 and 1984, SMP Negeri 2 Bandung between 1984–1987 and SMA Negeri 3 Bandung between 1987 and 1990. Ridwan Kamil then continued his tertiary education at the Bandung Institute of Technology and graduated in 1995 with a Bachelor of Engineering degree in architecture. Then, he continued his studies at University of California, Berkeley for two years until he obtained the title Master of Urban Design. After completing his master's degree in US, Ridwan Kamil returned to Indonesia and became a non-permanent lecturer at the Bandung Institute of Technology for 14 years in the Architectural Engineering study program before finally entering the world of politics.

Ridwan met his wife, Atalia Praratya, while at an exhibition in Bandung. and had two biological children, Emmeril Kahn Mumtadz (1999–2022) and Camillia Laetitia Azzahra (b. 2004), and one adopted child, Arkana Aidan Misbach (b. 2020). Emmeril died in Bern, Switzerland on 26 May 2022 at the age of 22, while he was swimming in the Aare river. On 9 June, his body was found at the Engehalde dam in Bern. His death was the subject of much attention in Indonesia: his funeral in Bandung was attended by thousands and broadcast live on state TV.

=== Education ===
Kamil spent almost his entire life in Bandung where he went to public schools and studied architecture at Indonesia's leading state engineering school, the Bandung Institute of Technology. After obtaining his college degree, he went to the United States to apprentice at architectural firms before winning a scholarship in 1999 to study at the College of Environmental Design, University of California, Berkeley in the United States. He graduated in 2001 with a Master of Urban Design degree and work experience at a Berkeley government department. He obtained Doctor (honoris causa) in Public Administration degree from Dong-a University in 2019 for his role in developing dynamic governance system for West Java Province. He was also awarded an honorary degree (DUniv) by the University of Glasgow in 2024.

== Professional career ==
After working as an architect in Hong Kong, in June 2004 Kamil and his partners founded Urbane, an architecture firm based in Bandung, West Java. He introduced modern designs into his work that ranges from commercial buildings and university towers to museums and mosques. He is also known for creating open public spaces in crowded residential areas in Bandung as his pro bono work.

=== Awards ===
In 2006, Kamil was the winner of the British Council's Young Creative Entrepreneur Award, representing Indonesia in the International Young Design Entrepreneur of the Year award.

Urbane Indonesia was listed in the BCI Asia Top 10 Awards from 2008 to 2010 and again in 2012.

=== Projects ===
Kamil was the pioneer of the 'Indonesia Berkebun' (Gardening Indonesia) movement to build amateur gardens in the cities of Indonesia. As of 2011 the community project is established in fourteen cities in Indonesia, with membership approaching 4000.

Kamil-designed Aceh Tsunami Museum

Kamil and Urbane Indonesia projects in Indonesia include

- Al Jabbar Grand Mosque in Bandung,
- United Tractors office tower in Jakarta,
- Al-Irsyad Mosque and Al-Irsyad Satya Islamic School in Bandung,
- Aceh Tsunami Museum in Banda Aceh,
- Tarumanagara University Tower I and campus renovation in West Jakarta, and
- Rasuna Epicentrum mall in South Jakarta

International projects include

- Marina Bay, Singapore Master Plan,
- Beijing Islamic Centre Mosque,
- Ras Al Khaimah Waterfront Master Plan,
- Suzhou Retail Waterfront Masterplan in China,
- Tech Park Kunming
- Grand Tourism Community Club House in Calcutta

== Political career ==
=== Mayor of Bandung ===
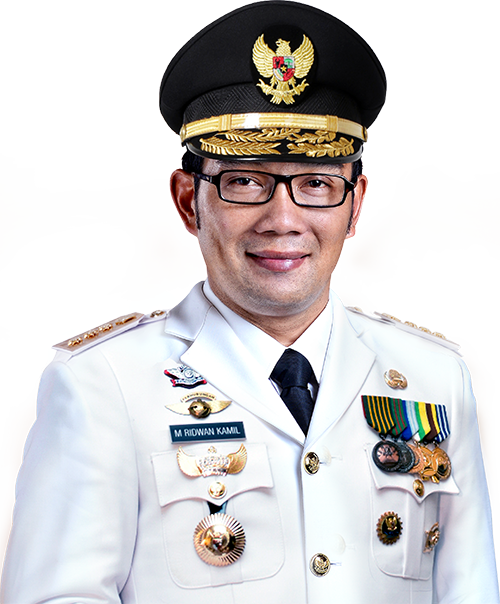
Official portrait as Mayor of Bandung

Kamil stepped into politics ahead of the 2013 Bandung mayoral election as a surprise candidate endorsed by the Islamist Prosperous Justice Party (PKS) and the nationalist Great Indonesia Movement Party (Gerindra), two rising parties from different ends of Indonesia's political spectrum that united to reform the city and prevent the position to go into the hands of the big parties at that time. Under the big parties, Bandung had been racked by corruption scandals. A few weeks after the June 2013 vote, 2003-13 Bandung mayor Dada Rosada became a corruption suspect himself and later received a 10-year jail sentence. PKS and Gerindra experimented by offering a clean, telegenic candidate without political affiliation but with known professional achievements through his iconic designs. Kamil, who until now is unaffiliated to any party, decisively defeated seven opponents in the race with 45% of votes, which almost tripled what his closest rival got, before becoming mayor of one of the most populous cities in Indonesia at the age of 42.

=== Governor of West Java ===
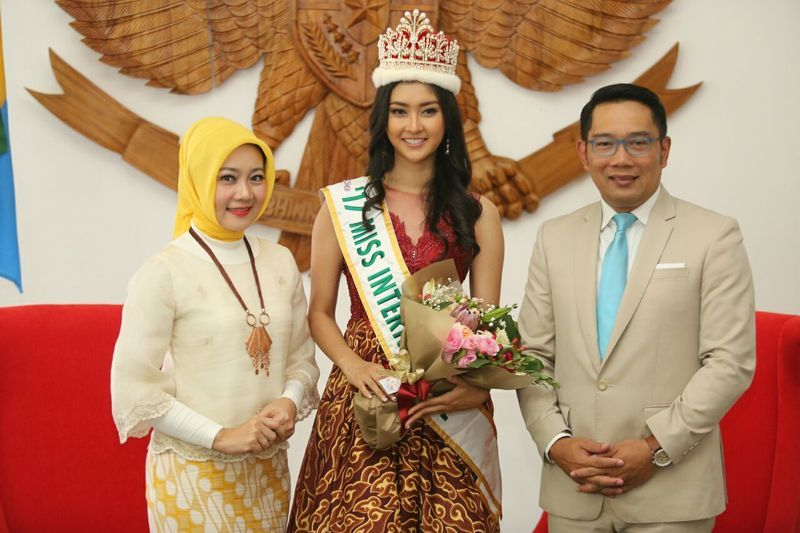
Kamil and Miss International 2017 Kevin Lilliana and his wife in Gedung Sate in 2017.

Being a popular mayor with a nationwide appeal, several big parties courted Kamil to run in the 2018 West Java gubernatorial election on their tickets but as a running mate to bolster the actual candidate for governor, who would be an affiliated politician. PKS and Gerindra, who had become stronger parties by 2018, also decided to pair their own members in a ticket. Similar to the 2013 experience, Kamil received endorsements from smaller parties, including the Islamist United Development Party that provided him a running mate, Tasikmalaya Regent Uu Ruzhanul Ulum. Kamil agreed to this arrangement, realizing he was popular among media-savvy urban voters, especially around Bandung, but weak among those who live in rural areas like Tasikmalaya. Kamil again won decisively with 33%, four percentage above his closest rival from Gerindra.

Interview with Ridwan Kamil regarding his works as governor, several weeks prior to the end of his term.

Kamil's victories in 2013 and 2018 proved that an unaffiliated candidate could win in Indonesian elections if the person has popular appeal, cultivated through strong media campaigns, and good communications with parties of all stripes. Despite his Western education and pluralist attitudes, Kamil understands how to build rapport with Islamists in Indonesia, the country with the world's largest Muslim population, in particular in West Java that is known for its Islamic conservatism.

During his reign, he started the project for Bus Rapid Transit in Bandung. The Bus Rapid Transit combined electric bus, light trains, and cable car to alleviate the traffic jam in Bandung. The project is planned to start in 2023.

=== 2024 Jakarta gubernatorial election ===
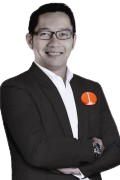
Ridwan Kamil as candidate of Governor of Jakarta (2024)

After media speculations foreshadowing his candidacy, Ridwan Kamil, known popularly as Kang Emil, declared his candidacy to run for Governor of Jakarta. His candidacy was supported by the Advanced Indonesia Coalition along with other parties such as PKS, PKB, PPP, and NasDem which was dubbed as KIM plus. He will be officially announced as a gubernatorial candidate in the near future along with the deputy gubernatorial candidate who is still in the process of being selected by the coalition.

Emil's candidacy is viewed as a strategic move due to his high popularity in Bandung as mayor and in West Java as governor. He had successfully ruled as mayor for 2 terms and governor for one term. In his campaign, he stressed the need for a healthy competition in a democracy, as he criticize the prospect of an election where only one candidate stands or having to face an empty ballot box.

Emil was recommended by Golkar, the party he has become a member since 2021, to run for Governor. He gained a wide support within the Advanced Indonesia Coalition and outside of the coalition. However, he is still waiting for the official announcement regarding who will be his running mate as vice governor candidate. When asked about his running mate, Emil told the media that his running mate will came from Advanced Indonesia Coalition plus members with the initial of 'S'. It was later revealed that Ridwan Kamil had chosen former Minister of Agriculture Suswono as his running mate and the pair will be declared on 19 August 2024.

== Controversies ==
=== Funding for Nahdlatul Ulama ===
In one of his speeches, Kamil claimed that he has given a 1 trillion rupiah grant to Nahdlatul Ulama, one of the biggest Sunni Islam movements in indonesia. The West Java branch of Nahdlatul Ulama claimed that they only received 2.4 billion rupiah from Kamil every year, and Kamil is only doing it to bolster his image. The West Java branch of Nahdlatul Ulama claimed that such speech could be interpreted as corruption and the missing funds could be classified as graft. Kamil explained to Nahdlatul Ulama that the financials of the grant could be held accountable, and the government of West Java has correctly been giving 1 trillion rupiahs for the past 4 years for the need of the students of pesantrens affiliated with Nahdlatul Ulama.

=== Construction of mosques ===
Kamil is known to frequently construct mosques. One of his biggest mosque construction under his administration is the Masjid Al-Jabbar, that cost 1 trillion rupiahs. The construction of the mosque receives critiques from the public as the funding to build the mosque is better used to construct mass transportation, fixing infrastructure, and repairing damaged school buildings (Opinion?).

In 2022, Kamil is planning to build a mosque in Depok area to accommodate locals that are looking for mosque after going home after work. The move gained controversy as the planned mosque will have to demolish SD Negeri Pondok Cina 1, a primary school. The parents of the student of the school rejected the construction of the mosque, but some of the members of the public determined that the construction of the mosque is urgent due to the lack of mosque. The government of West Java had planned to construct the mosque on an empty plot of land, but due to the high cost of land on the area it is decided to demolish the school and construct the mosque there. In February 2022, Kamil ordered that the school is demolished and the school is removed from the list of active schools in West Java. The students of the school will be forcibly relocated to other schools. The new mosque will be constructed in August 2023, with the total construction cost of 18.8 billion rupiahs. In February 2023, despite mediation between the parents of the school and the government of Depok the government stated that the demolition of the school will continue to proceed.

=== 2024 presidential bid ===
On 18 January 2022, Kamil announced his intention to run as presidential candidate. Since he is an independent politician and realizing it is currently impossible for independent politician run for presidential campaign in Indonesia, he hoped that there will be any political party will take him as the presidential candidate.

In late December 2022, Reports emerged that Kamil is close to joining a political party with speculations that the move is part of his continued efforts to enter the presidential race. The two parties said to be closest to recruiting him are members of the United Indonesia Coalition (KIB), The National Mandate Party (PAN), and The Party of Functional Groups (Golkar). In January 2023, he officially joined the Golkar Party.

=== Bid for head of new Indonesian capital ===
On 20 January 2022, Joko Widodo expressed his intention to set an architect and had experience in regional managing and governing as future CEO of the National Capital Authority of Nusantara, the future capital of Indonesia. Until 2022, only a few technocrats which hailed from architecture background which have name and reputation in Indonesian politics, Kamil himself, Tri Rismaharini, the current Minister of Social Affairs, and Danny Pomanto, former architecture lecturer of Hasanuddin University and current mayor of Makassar. Although initially reluctant to campaign for the position, on 24 January 2022, Kamil launched an electronic campaign to harness aspiration for the future capital project on Twitter.

== See also ==
- List of solved missing person cases (2020s)

== In popular culture ==
Ridwan Kamil made some cameo appearances in several TV and movie productions, particularly the ones that are set in Bandung. Kamil also runs very active social media accounts that document his personal, professional, and political activities with millions of followers.

=== Filmography ===
==== Film ====
Year	Title	Role
2013	Demi Ucok	Lecturer
2014	Hijabers in Love	Bandros driver
2015	The Wedding & Bebek Betutu	Himself
2017	Total Chaos	Rossa's father
2018	Dilan 1990	Teacher
2018	Friends but Married	Lecturer
2018	Serendipity	Restaurant owner
2019	Dilan 1991	School headmaster
2019	Yowis Ben 2	Museum visitor
2020	Mangga Muda	Manager of Gemah Ripah Taxi
2020	Riki Rhino	Grada (voice actor)
2022	Gara-Gara Warisan	Guest house visitor
2022	Ranah 3 Warna	Ambassador of Indonesia to Canada

==== Television ====
Year	Title	Role
2015	Preman Pensiun	Himself (2 episodes)
2022	Ikatan Cinta	Aldebaran's business partner (1 episode)
2022	Kabayan Milenial Series	Himself (special appearance, 1 episode)
2023	Preman Pensiun 8	Himself (1 episode)

== Honours ==
- Satyalancana Kebaktian Sosial (2015)
- Satyalancana Pembangunan (2016)
- Satyalancana Karya Bhakti Praja Nugraha (2017)
- Satyalancana Wira Karya (2023)
- Lencana Melati Gerakan Pramuka
- Lencana Karya Bakti, Gerakan Pramuka (2021)
- Lencana Darma Bakti Pramuka, Gerakan Pramuka (2017)

Political offices
Preceded by Ahmad Heryawan	Governor of West Java; 2018–2023	Succeeded by Bey Triadi Machmudin (acting)
