= Lorong Waktu =

Lorong Waktu may refer to:

- Lorong Waktu, an Indonesian television series that first aired in 1999
- Lorong Waktu (1999), which ran from 1999 to 2006
- Lorong Waktu (2019), an animated series which ran in 2019
- Lorong Waktu (2025), a series which ran in 2025
