= Sang Pencerah =

- Promotional film poster
- Directed by: Hanung Bramantyo
- Screenplay by: Hanung Bramantyo
- Produced by: Raam Punjabi
- Starring: Lukman Sardi; Zaskia Adya Mecca; Slamet Rahardjo; Ihsan Tarore; Giring Ganesha
- Cinematography: Faozan Rizal
- Edited by: Wawan I. Wibowo
- Music by: Tya Subiakto Satrio
- Production company: MVP Pictures
- Release date: September 8, 2010 (Indonesia)
- Running time: 112 minutes
- Country: Indonesia
- Languages: Indonesian; Javanese
- Budget: Rp. 12 billion (US$ 1.3 million)
- Box office: Rp. 33 billion (US$2.3 million)

Sang Pencerah (The Enlightener) is a 2010 Indonesian film directed by Hanung Bramantyo and starring Lukman Sardi, Zaskia Adya Mecca, and Slamet Rahardjo. It is a biopic of Ahmad Dahlan which describes how he came to found the Islamic organisation Muhammadiyah.

Sang Pencerah, produced to coincide with Muhammadiyah's centenary, was announced in November 2009. It was meant to be historically accurate, with much of the Rp. 12 billion (US$1.3 million) budget paying for period costumes and sets. However, as documentation on the early years of Dahlan's life is lacking, those scenes were fictionalised. Sang Pencerah marks the feature film debut of Ihsan Tarore and Giring Ganesha.

The film, released on 8 September 2010 during the Eid ul-Fitr holiday, was meant to show different views of Islam; however, it has also been interpreted as a critique of the current Muhammadiyah leadership. It was seen in theatres by over 1 million people – the only Indonesian film of 2010 to do so. It also received favourable critical reception, winning the 2011 Bandung Film Festival after being refused a nomination at the 2010 Indonesian Film Festival. However, some Muslim critics decried it as being too liberal.

== Plot ==
Muhammad Darwis (Ihsan Tarore) is a youth in 19th-century Kauman, Yogyakarta, and the son of Kyai Abubakar, the imam of the area's mosque. Displeased with the mixture of Islam and animistic Javanese mysticism, which leads to poor Javanese spending exorbitant amounts of money on religious ceremonies, Darwis decides to go on the hajj to Mecca in Saudi Arabia. While there, he studies what he considers the true form of Islam over a period of five years.

Upon his return to Yogyakarta, Darwis (now played by Lukman Sardi) changes his name to Ahmad Dahlan and begins teaching Islam, preaching that prayers need only come from inner peace and do not require large donations or sacrifices. Conflict soon arises between Dahlan and the local kyais (religious leaders) after he shows that the direction in which they pray is wrong, pointing not to the Kaaba in Mecca but to Africa. The kyais, especially Cholil Kamaludiningrat (Slamet Rahardjo), decry Dahlan as the leader of a cult and provoke a crowd of their followers to destroy the building next to Dahlan's house used for studying prayer.

Dahlan continues to preach and teach, opening a school for native people, teaching Islam at a Dutch-run school, and opening a small mosque; he also marries his cousin, Siti Walidah. His actions, such as having his students sit on chairs instead of the traditional mats on the floor, lead to Kamaludiningrat decrying Dahlan as an unbeliever who is working to Westernise the local populace.

Despite continued resistance from Kamaludiningrat, Dahlan prevails and furthers his teaching. Together with Walidah, and the students Dirjo (Abdurrahman Arif), Fahrudin (Mario Irwinsyah), Hisyam (Dennis Adishwara), Sangidu (Ricky Perdana), and Sudja (Giring Ganesha), he founds the progressive Islamic organisation Muhammadiyah, which preaches Islam without any influence from Javanese mysticism.

== Cast ==
- Lukman Sardi as Muhammad Darwis
  - Ihsan Tarore as young Muhammad Darwis
- Zaskia Adya Mecca as Siti Walidah
  - Marsha Natika as young Siti Walidah
- Slamet Rahardjo as Cholil Kamaludiningrat
- Abdrurrahman Arif as Dirjo
- Mario Irwinsyah as Fahrudin
- Dennis Adishwara as Hisyam
- Ricky Perdana as Sangidu
- Giring Ganesha as Sudja

== Production ==
The film announced in November 2009. It was directed by Hanung Bramantyo, a Yogyakarta-born Muslim filmmaker. Bramantyo, who had previously directed the Islamic-themed Ayat-Ayat Cinta (The Verses of Love; 2008), considered Dahlan his favourite national hero; he later told The Jakarta Post that he admired the kyai's spirit. He also said that he had been wanting to make the film since he was a teenager. The film was meant to coincide with the 100 year anniversary of Muhammadiyah's founding.

Bramantyo attempted to make his film as historically accurate as possible. However, as no documentation of Dahlan's life before he went to Mecca exists, the scenes showing Dahlan's youth were fictionalized. The script underwent 12 revisions before the film was completed. Much of the film's budget of Rp. 12 billion (US$1.3 million) was spent on costumes and sets to ensure accuracy. The crew restored several old buildings for their shots and custom-ordered 19th-century style traditional garments for their scenes.

Bramatyo cast his wife, Zaskia Adya Mecca, as Ahmad Dahlan's wife Siti Walidah — Mecca also served as casting director, in charge of auditioning the supporting cast. Before filming began, Mecca attempted to research the biographies of Dahlan and his wife, as she and the other young actors did not know much about the couple. However, she found such research difficult as the libraries did not have the information she needed.

Lukman Sardi, who played Dahlan, was also unaware of his character's historical biography before researching it; he noted that he was not very confident in playing the role. Indonesian Idol winner Ihsan Tarore was cast as the young Ahmad Dahlan, while the lead singer of the band Nidji, Giring Ganesha, was cast as Dahlan's protege Sudja; it was the feature film debut for both. Giring also wrote a song for the film, titled "Allah Maha Suci" ("Allah, the All-Pure"), over a period of two days.

On set, Mecca, who was pregnant at the time of shooting, found her physical condition "perfect" for the role as Walidah had been a large woman. However, her pregnancy led to Bramantyo worrying about a potential miscarriage during a scene where Mecca had to ride a traditional carriage with wooden wheels, which shook violently when moving.

== Themes ==
In a 2011 interview with the Jakarta Globe after the release of his controversial film ?, Bramantyo said that he had intended Sang Pencerah to use Dahlan's life to examine different aspects of Islam. He meant for the film to show Islam as being a peaceful and truthful religion. Pramono, writing for Tempo, notes that the film presents a different side of Dahlan, who is usually portrayed as an old, bearded man who, in his opinion, seems neither modernist nor progressive.

Ahmad Muttaqin, a lecturer on comparative religious studies at Sunan Kalijaga Islamic University in Yogyakarta, sees the film as a critique of the current Muhammadiyah leadership, whom he describes as "narrow minded, intolerant, hav[ing] poor social respect, [...] rigid and allergic to progress".

== Release and reception ==
Sang Pencerah was released on 8 September 2010, over the Eid ul-Fitr holiday; the increase in film attendance over the holiday is similar to blockbuster season for Hollywood films. According to Bramantyo, Sang Pencerah was seen by 1.1 million people while in theatres; a report from The Jakarta Globe says 1.2 million. It was the only Indonesian film of 2010 to sell over a million tickets.

Bramatnyo was accused of working for Muhammadiyah when creating the film, an accusation which he denied. He also was criticised by some Muslim groups, which considered him too liberal. The film was not nominated for best picture at the 2010 Indonesian Film Festival after several nominees threatened to withdraw if Sang Pencerah was nominated. Sang Pencerah later won best picture at the Bandung Film Festival, held in Bandung, West Java, on 6 May 2011.

Triwik Kurniasari, reviewing for The Jakarta Post, praised Sardi and Rahardjo's acting; noting that Sang Pencerah was "a good film and a conduit for young people to learn about their national heroes". Asep Saefudin, writing for Antara, himself a graduate from Muhammadiyah schools, viewed the film as being well put together and reflective of the issues faced by Islamic modernists in the early 1900s. Pramono praised the film's acting, soundtrack, and plot, especially Dahlan's portrayal as a human with emotions and flaws instead of being perfect in every way. He found Sang Pencerah's greatest weakness to be the language spoken by in some scenes, as it mixed Indonesian with Javanese (something not done during the period portrayed), and the film's stars – neither of whom is Javanese – had inaccurate accents.
