= Lorong Waktu (2025 TV series) =

- Genre: Science fiction; Religion; Comedy
- Created by: Deddy Mizwar
- Written by: Team DGCS
- Starring: Deddy Mizwar; Miqdad Addausy; Inara Ramadhania; Renaga Tahier; Baiti Syaghaf
- Theme music composer: Yovial Virgi
- Country of origin: Indonesia
- Original language: Indonesian
- No. of seasons: 1
- No. of episodes: 30

Production
- Executive producers: Giselawati Wiranegara; Senandung Nacita
- Producer: Deddy Mizwar
- Production location: Jakarta
- Running time: 60 minutes

Original release
- Network: SCTV
- Release: 1 March – 30 March 2025

Related
- Lorong Waktu (2019)

Lorong Waktu (also unofficially referred as Lorong Waktu Reborn) is the seventh season of the television series Lorong Waktu. This season aired during the month of Ramadan 1446 Hijri (or the year 2025 AD) and was broadcast on SCTV and Vidio. It represents a further development (reboot) of Lorong Waktu following the animated version released in 2019, and the sixth season, which aired in 2006.

== Premise ==
For the 2025 version, Lorong Waktu adopts a soft reboot approach, which retains some continuity with the original series while changing its style, tone, or purpose. This aims to provide more creative freedom to the writers while largely maintaining the setting familiar to the audience. In this version, Haji Husin, along with his student Zidan, returns as the main characters, embarking on adventures through an advanced time machine in their efforts to help others. This time, they are joined by a little girl named Cantika.

== Cast ==
- Deddy Mizwar as Haji Husin
- Miqdad Addausy as Zidan
- Inara Ramadhania as Cantika
- Renaga Tahier as Alvin
- Baiti Syaghaf as Tamara
- Ozzol Ramdan as Arjuna
- Zoul Pandjoul as Untung
- Widi Dwinanda as Linda
- Agus Kuncoro as Yuda
- Tika Bravani as Najwa
- Gabriella Desta as Olivia
- Muhammad Abyan as Adul
- Keanu Azka as Faiz
- Irfan Boy Siagian as Prabu
- Faiz Vishal as Rahman
- Muklis as Pemilik Rental Buku Komik
- Sandi Mochin as Jupri

== Production ==
In 2018, Deddy Mizwar frequently received questions and feedback from the public regarding the possibility of a Lorong Waktu remake. At that time, the public also felt that Para Pencari Tuhan (which was also produced by Mizwar himself) had started to become monotonous, especially after some of its main cast members, such as Trio Bajaj, Agus Kuncoro, and Zaskia Adya Mecca, had left the show. However, on the other hand, Mizwar could not remake Lorong Waktu due to the difficulty of finding replacements for the cast, particularly someone to take over Jourast Jordy's role as Zidan. As an alternative to satisfy the audience's longing, Mizwar then chose to produce Lorong Waktu in an animated version. This animated series aired in 2019. In the press conference for the release of the 2025 version of the Lorong Waktu series, Mizwar stated that the series was created to meet the market demand for television series for Indonesian children, whose production has significantly decreased in recent years.

The production of Lorong Waktu began in mid-2024, with Miqdad Addausy sharing behind-the-scenes footage of the filming process through his Instagram account. The Masjid Raya Baitussalam, located in the Billy Moon Complex, Duren Sawit, East Jakarta, was once again used as the main location for the story. This mosque had previously been used in seasons two through six.

The former cast members who last appeared in season six, such as Hefri Olifian (Ustaz Addin), Zaskia Adya Mecca (Sabrina), Jourast Jordy (young Zidan), Opie Kumis (Havid), Ramdhani Qubil AJ (Jambrong), and Asrul Dahlan (Jagur), do not appear in the latest season of Lorong Waktu. Jordy himself could not participate as he had decided to retire from acting in 2012 and is now working at a food company located in Surabaya. Agus Kuncoro is the only former cast member included in the new season. Previously, he portrayed a character named Jardin in season three, which aired in 2002.
