= Ahmad Dahlan =

Indonesian Muslim religious leader and revivalist

Kyai Haji Ahmad Dahlan
- أحمد دحلان
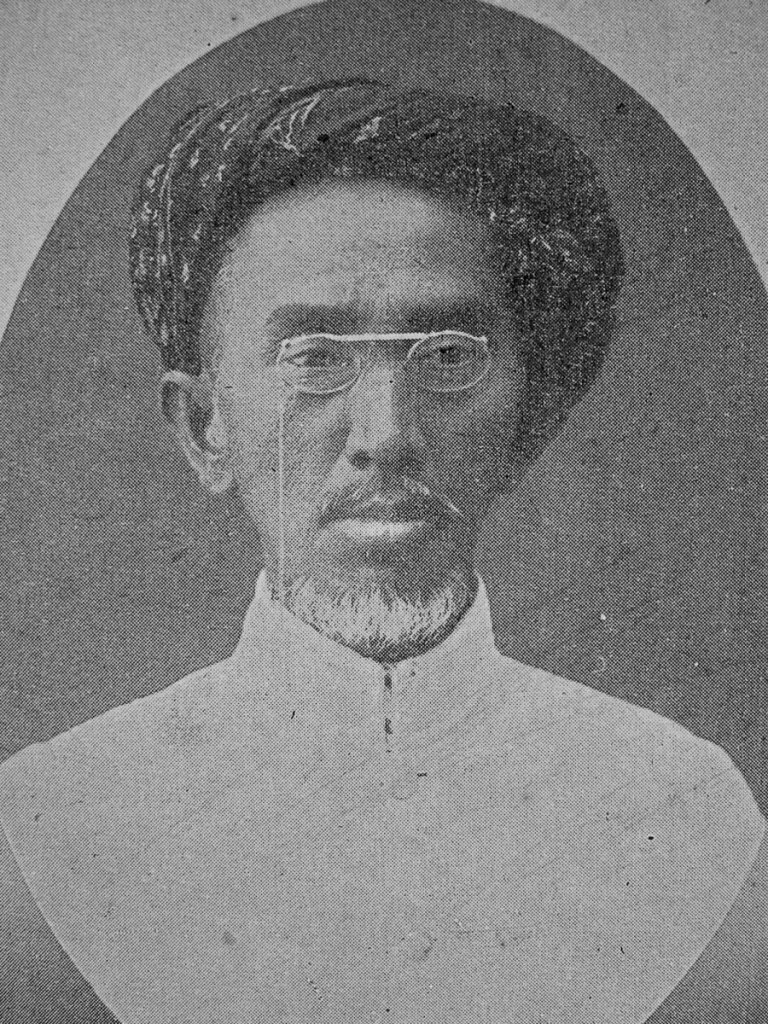
- Photo of Ahmad Dahlan, unknown date

Chairperson of Muhammadiyah
- In office 18 November 1912 – 23 February 1923
- Succeeded by: K.H. Ibrahim

Personal life
- Born: Muhammad Darwis; 1 August 1868 Kauman, Yogyakarta, Yogyakarta Sultanate, Dutch East Indies
- Died: 23 February 1923 (aged 54) Yogyakarta, Yogyakarta Sultanate, Dutch East Indies
- Resting place: Karangkajen Graveyard, Yogyakarta
- Spouse: Siti Walidah
- Children: 7
- Parents: Haji Abu Bakar (father); Siti Aminah (mother)
- Known for: Founder of Muhammadiyah
- Occupation: Kyai

Religious life
- Religion: Islam
- Denomination: Sunni

Muslim leader
- Influenced by: Ibn Taymiyyah; Muhammad Abduh; Rashid Rida; Jamal al-Din al-Afghani; Ahmad Khatib al-Minangkabawi; Nawawi Al-Bantani

Kyai Haji Ahmad Dahlan (born as Muhammad Darwis; Arabic: أحمد دحلان; 1 August 1868 – 23 February 1923), often abbreviated to K. H. Ahmad Dahlan, was an Indonesian Muslim religious leader and revivalist, who established the Muhammadiyah organization, which would become one of the largest Muslim organizations in Indonesia, second only to the Nahdlatul Ulama. Born in Kauman, Yogyakarta, he was the son of an imam of a local mosque and traced his origins from the lineage of Muhammad. Ahmad Dahlan performed the Hajj pilgrimage when he was 15 years old, and he lived in Mecca for another five years.

There, he became involved with reformist thoughts within Islam. He returned to Indonesia in 1888. In 1903, he went to Mecca again to deepen his religious knowledge. He returned to Indonesia in 1905, and two years later, he joined the Budi Utomo organization. However, his supporters urged him to create his organization. In 1912, he created the Muhammadiyah organization, as a means of realising his reformist ideals. The organization was quickly joined by merchants and craftsmen. In 1917, he added a women's section named Aisyiyah, which played a significant role in modernising the life of Indonesian women. Spreading to the Outer Islands, Muhammadiyah established a strong base in Sulawesi only a decade later after it was founded.

It was one of several indigenous Indonesian organisations founded in the first three decades of the twentieth century; a time known as the Indonesian National Awakening; that were key in establishing a sense of Indonesian nationalism, and ultimately independence. Throughout the last year of his life, Ahmad Dahlan suffered from several health issues. In 1923, following the advice of his doctor, he took some time to rest at Mount Tretes, Malang, East Java, before finally returning to Yogyakarta, to attend an annual Muhammadiyah meeting. His health continued to deteriorate until he died on 23 February 1923. His body was buried at Karangkajen's grave. For his services, Ahmad Dahlan was inaugurated as a National Hero, according to Presidential Decree No. 657 of 1961.

== Early life ==
=== Youth and family ===
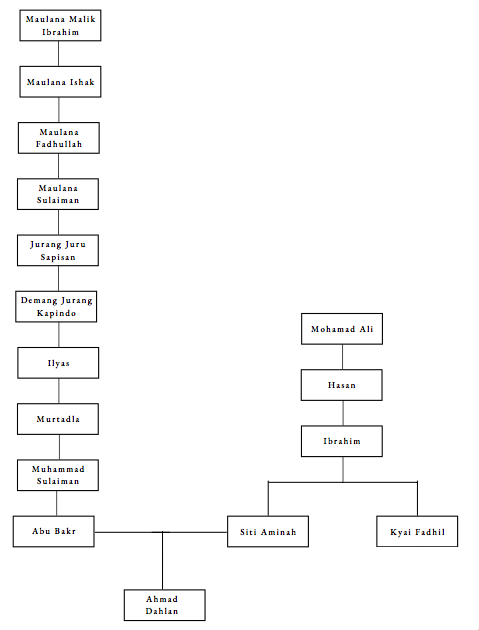
Genealogical tree of Ahmad Dahlan

Ahmad Dahlan, born as Muhammad Darwis, was born in the Muslim quarter of the city of Yogyakarta, known as Kauman, which was ruled by the Yogyakarta Sultanate, under the boot of colonial rule, on 1 August 1868. He was the fourth child of seven children of Kyai Haji Abu Bakr bin Kyai Sulaiman, and his wife, Siti Aminah Binti Kyai Haji Ibrahim. His father was a palace courtier of the Sultanate of Yogyakarta and served as an imam and a preacher at the Kauman Great Mosque. His mother was a descendant of several kyai's, with both her father-in-law and grandfather-in-law being kyai's. Namely Kyai Hasan, and Kyai Mohamad Ali.

Muhammad Darwis came from a long line of Javanese kyai's. He was the 12th generation descendant of Maulana Ibrahim, better known as Sunan Gresik, a member of the Wali Sanga, a group of revered saints of Islam in Indonesia, with a lineage tracing back to Muhammad himself. According to Salam Jusuf, his lineage to Sunan Gresik is as follows: From Darwis's father, Abu Bakr, to his grandfather Muhammad Sulaiman, to his great-grandfather, Kyai Murtadla, to his great-great-grandfather, Kyai Ilyas. Continued, through four 5 more different persons (Demang Jurang Juru Kapindo, Jurang Juru Sapisan, Maulana Sulaiman Ki Ageng Gribig, Maulana Fadhullah, and Maulana Ishaq), before reaching Maulana Ibrahim. He was raised in the Kauman area of Yogyakarta and was initially taught directly by his parents in a family environment. Being educated on the matters of religion and the Quran. However, he was later sent to a pesantren to further his knowledge.

=== First pilgrimage ===
In 1883, Darwis was sent to Mecca, to perform the pilgrimage, and deepen his religious knowledge. Due in part to financial assistance from his brother-in-law, Kyai Haji Soleh. The night before his departure, the community gathered at his father's house to pray for Darwis' safety during the pilgrimage. In the morning, Darwis boarded the train to Semarang at Tugu station. His arrival in Semarang was greeted by other relatives who had prepared a boarding house to rest while he waited for his departure by boat. He continued his journey and boarded a Chinese merchant vessel which was bound for Singapore. The vessel arrived in Singapore after only two days at sea. Darwis' arrival there was greeted by Sheikh Abdul Kahar, who then invited him to stay at the Kampung Jawa lodge for five days. He then continued his journey to Mecca, and boarded the Mispil ship, which departed for Europe via Aden and Jeddah. After going through the Red Sea, the ship arrived at the port of Jeddah.

The arrival of the prospective pilgrims was welcomed by representatives of the government of Mecca, before being handed over to representatives of each country. In the case of the Dutch East Indies, every city in the archipelago had a sheikh in Mecca who was in charge of guiding the prospective pilgrims. After completing his pilgrimage, Darwis remained in Mecca to study religious knowledge. For five years, he collected several religious books and studied various Islamic religious jurisprudence, which included qiraat, tafsir, tawhid, fiqh, and tasawuf. In Mecca, Dahlan associated with other fellow Indonesian pilgrims from Sulawesi, West Java, West Sumatra, Aceh, and other areas, which helped all of them conceive of a common interest against the Dutch colonial authorities of Indonesia and the need to revive Islam in Indonesia. Towards the end of his time in Mecca, he met with Imam Syafi'i Sayid Bakri Syatha to change his name from Muhammad Darwis to Ahmad Dahlan. Tradition at that time was that pilgrims who would return to their homeland would meet a cleric to give an Arabic name in front of which he added the word Hajj as a substitute for his old name. Thus, he became Haji Ahmad Dahlan. He also became the student of Ahmad Khatib Al-Minangkabawi, an Imam at Masjid al-Haram, who was also the teacher of Zakaria bin Muhammad Amin and Hasyim Asy'ari.

== Muhammadiyah ==
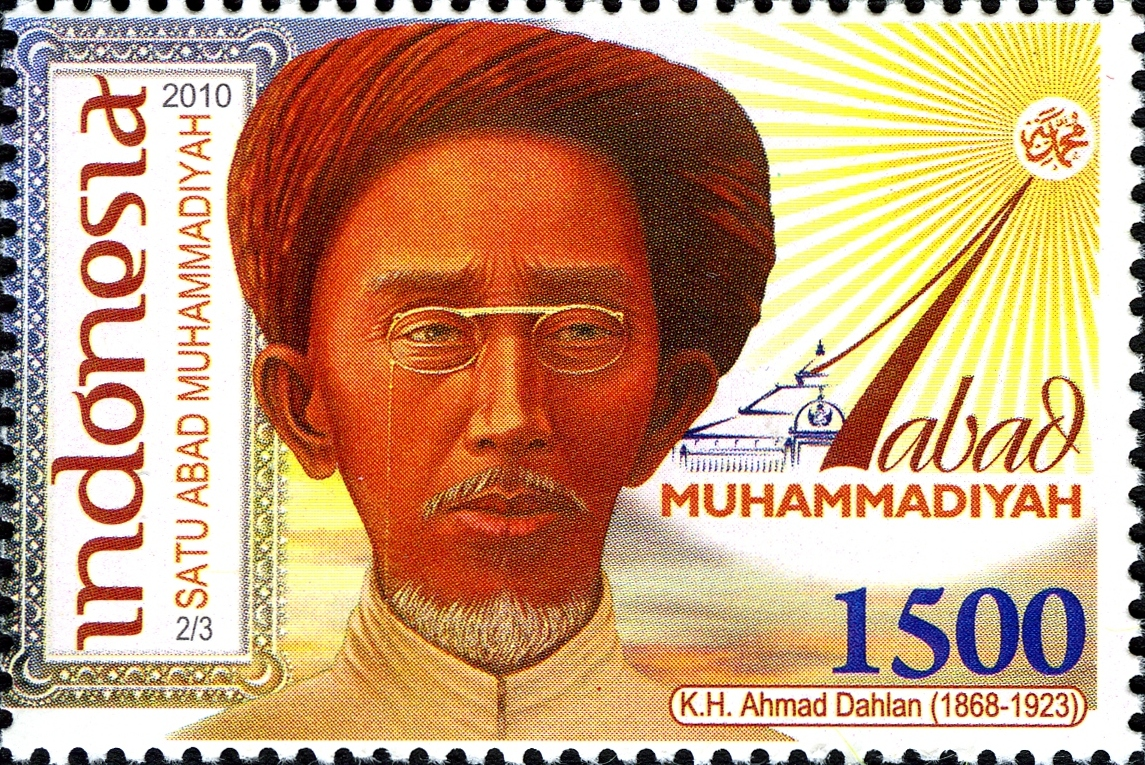
Stamps of Indonesia, 2010

After returning to Java around 1888, Dahlan married the daughter of the imam of the Great Mosque in Yogyakarta. As one of a growing group who regarded themselves as modernists, he was concerned at the many Javanese practices that were not justified by Islamic scripture. and argued for the creation of a renewed, purer Islam more in step with the modern world. The efforts of Western Christian missionaries also concerned him. He joined Budi Utomo in 1909, hoping to preach reform to its members, but his supporters urged him to create his own organization.

Dahlan created Muhammadiyah in 1912 as an educational organisation and as a means of realizing his reformist ideals. It was quickly joined by traders and craftsmen. In 1917, he added a women's section named Aisyiyah, which played a significant role in modernizing the life of Indonesian women. Spreading to the outer islands, Muhammadiyah established a strong base in Sulawesi only a decade after it was founded. It was one of several indigenous Indonesian organisations founded in the first three decades of the twentieth century—a time known as the Indonesian National Awakening—that were key in establishing a sense of Indonesian nationalism, and ultimately independence. Today, with more than 60 million members, Muhammadiyah is the second largest Muslim organisation in Indonesia after Nahdlatul Ulama.

Ahmad Dahlan died aged 54 in Yogyakarta.

== See also ==
- Muhammadiyah
- Nyai Ahmad Dahlan
- Winai Dahlan

Preceded by Office established	Chairman of Muhammadiyah; 1912–1922	Succeeded by KH Ibrahim
