= Aditya Novika =

Indonesian model and actress

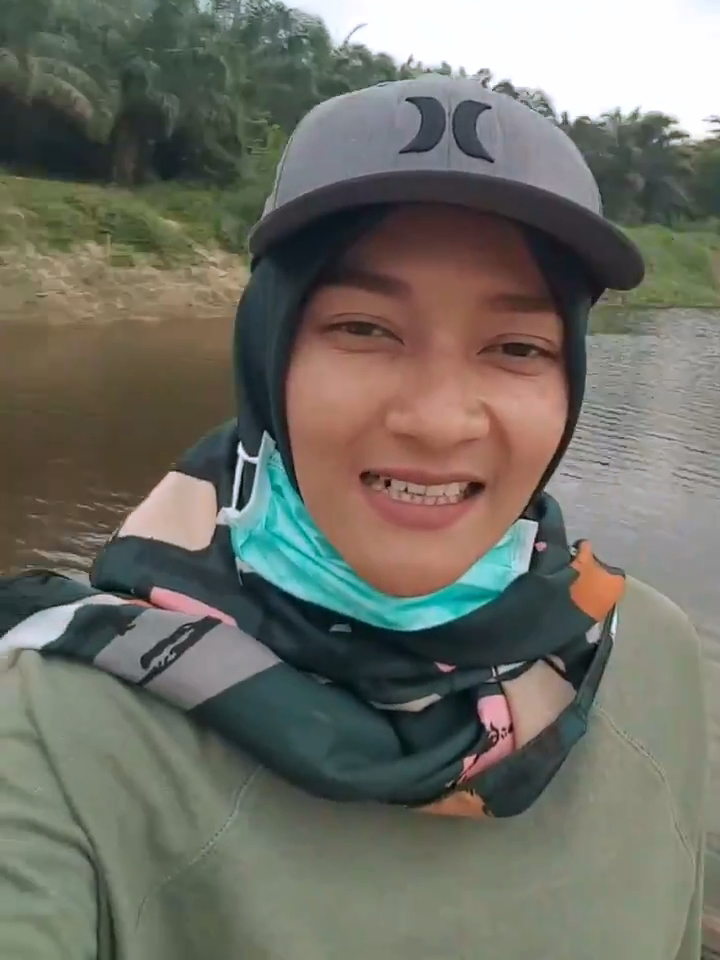
- Aditya Novika in 2019
- Born: Aditya Novikasari; November 6, 1982 (age 43); Yogyakarta, Special Region of Yogyakarta
- Other name: Vika Aditya
- Education: Sekolah Tinggi Multi Media Yogyakarta
- Occupations: Actress, model
- Known for: Cast as Sabrina in Lorong Waktu
- Children: 2

Aditya Novikasari or better known as Vika Aditya (born November 6, 1982) is an Indonesian model, actress and television presenter. She is best knowing for cast as Sabrina in Ramadan television series, Lorong Waktu. She has also been in the top three finalists for Putri Indonesia Yogyakarta.

== Profile ==
Vika is an alumni from Sekolah Tinggi Multi Media Yogyakarta. She has an apprenticeship at a TV station in Hungary for three months and learned a lot about how to make a television show and how to host a show. From college until graduation, she was involved in several soap opera production titles, including Romansa 21 and Gita Cinta Dari SMU'. In these two productions, Vika became an extra role. The main role she got when she joined the production of Lorong Waktu series in 2004. She replaced Christy Jusung for lead character Sabrina. Then she also played a role in another Ramadan soap opera Kiamat Sudah Dekat in 2005.

Although she is often offered both as an actress in soap operas or television presenter, Vika prefers to work independently and remains domiciled in his hometown in Yogyakarta rather than living in Jakarta. She was also a salesperson for Hotel Jentra Dagen as well as being a blogger and MC for events around Yogyakarta.

Vika is active in several independent film productions in her hometown of Yogyakarta. She became an actress and talent scout for Orca Films, an independent film production house from Sleman. As a talent scout, she helps young talents to be recommended to Rano Karno at Karnos Film or Deddy Mizwar at Demi Gisela Citra Sinema.

In 2016, Vika casting as dr. Aulia in the film Pesantren Impian. In 2018 she collaborated with six authors in making a book entitled Syak Merah Jambu. She is active in various artistic activities including being a poet and cultural tutor in Yogyakarta.

== Filmography ==
=== TV series ===
- Romansa 21
- Gita Cita Dari SMU
- Lorong Waktu as Sabrina
- Kiamat Sudah Dekat

=== Movies ===
- Sekolahku, Rumahku
- Pesantren Impian as Dr. Aulia
