= Tajug =

Islamic architecture elements

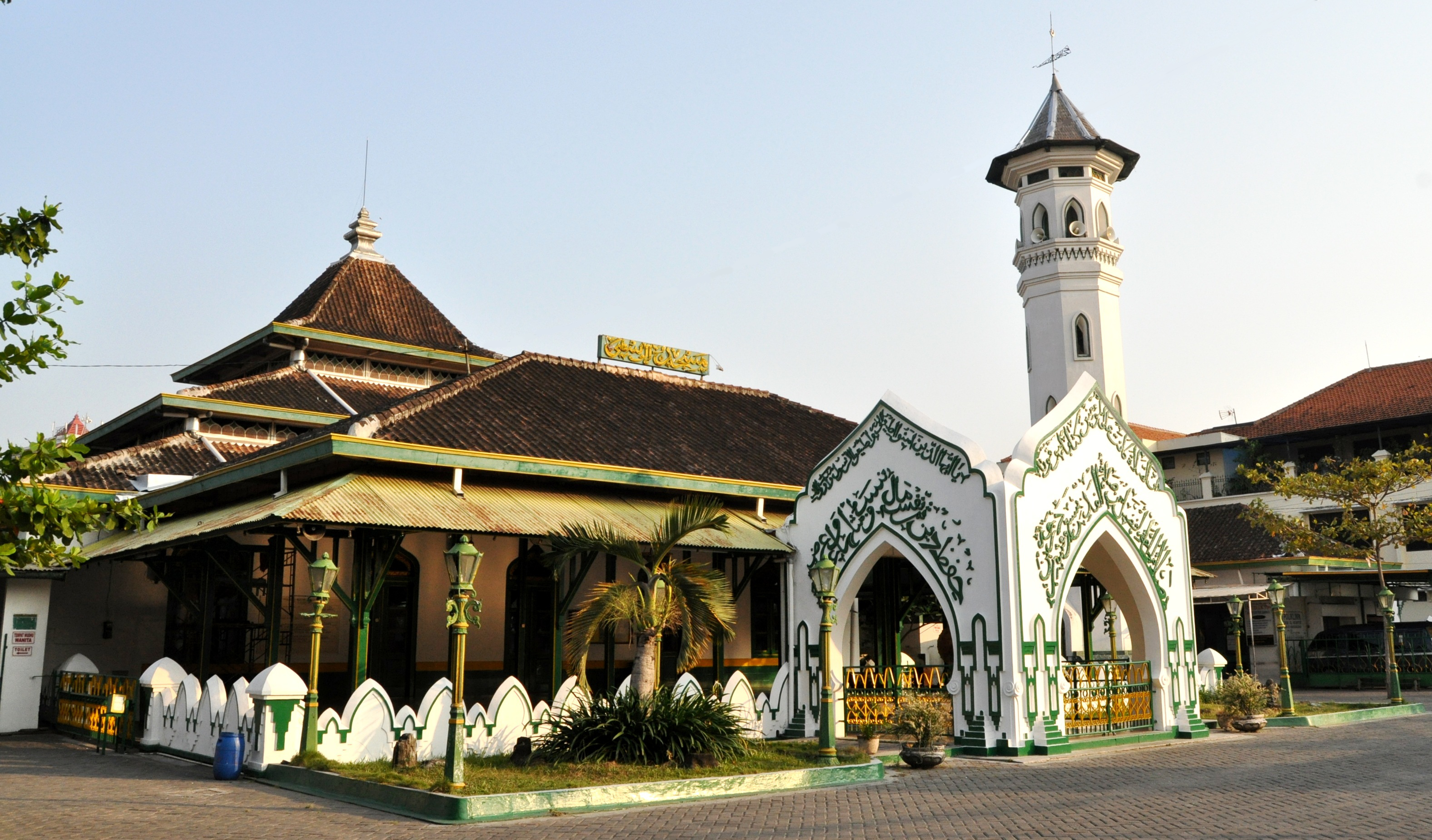
Tajug seen here on the roof of Wustho Mangkunegaran Mosque, Surakarta.

Tajug is a pyramidal or pyramid square (i.e. an equilateral square base with a peak) ornament which is usually used for sacred buildings in Southeast Asia including Indonesia, such as mosque or cupola graveyard. It is considered derived from Indian and Chinese architecture, which has history since pre-Islamic era, although there's also an element of an influence from Indian mosques. The term tajug is also used to refer to mosques or surau (Islamic assembly building) in some regions of Indonesia.

Tajug vary substantially in design from place to place. In some mosques, including Limo Kaum Mosque in West Sumatra, upper levels of the tiered roof structure are used as floors, while in many other mosques the tiered roofs are only used to provide ventilation.

Tajug are topped with a decorative finial at their peak, known as a mustaka.

== See also ==
- Indonesian mosques
