= Lorong Waktu (1999 TV series) =

Indonesian television series

- Title card for first season
- Genre: Science fiction; Religion; Comedy
- Created by: Deddy Mizwar
- Written by: Wahyu H.S.
- Starring: Deddy Mizwar; Adjie Pangestu; Dicky Chandra; Hefri Olifian; Jourast Jordy; Christy Jusung; Aditya Novika; Zaskia Adya Mecca; Opie Kumis; Ramdhani Qubil AJ; Asrul Dahlan
- Theme music composer: Anes Bali; Chossy Pratama
- Country of origin: Indonesia
- Original language: Indonesian
- No. of seasons: 6
- No. of episodes: 207

Production
- Executive producer: Deddy Mizwar
- Producer: Giselawati Wiranegara
- Production location: Jakarta metropolitan area
- Running time: 20-minute (season 1–5); 40-minute (season 6)

Original release
- Network: SCTV
- Release: December 9, 1999 – July 8, 2006

Related
- Lorong Waktu (2019); Lorong Waktu (2025)

Lorong Waktu (literally translated as The Time Passage) is an Indonesian Islamic religious science fiction television series created by Deddy Mizwar and directed by Abdul Kadir, Aldisar Syafar and Deddy Mizwar himself with scenario written by Wahyu H.S. It stars Deddy Mizwar, Jourast Jordy, Hefri Olifian, Christy Jusung and Opie Kumis. The storyline revolves around the adventures of time travel by Haji Husin and his student Zidan through a sophisticated time machine created by Ustād Addin. This series was produced by Demi Gisela Citra Sinema and aired by SCTV in 1999 to coincide with the month of Ramadan 1420 Hijri. After the success of its first season, the series was continued in five other seasons for a total of 207 episodes until its final broadcast in 2006. In 2019, the series was remade in an animated format with the same title and aired during the month of Ramadan regularly by SCTV.

Together with the Keluarga Cemara and Si Doel Anak Sekolahan, Lorong Waktu is often referred to as the golden masterpiece from the Indonesian television series.

A reboot series, which still retains some story elements from the original version, ran in SCTV in 2025.

== Premise ==
Lorong Waktu tells the adventures of Ustād Addin, Haji Husin, and a young student named Zidan. Ustād Addin is a young orphan who is considered a child by Haji Husin and has skills in information technology. He invents a time machine, which then takes Haji Husin and Zidan on adventures through the past and the future.

In the second season, two new characters are introduced: Havid, a former thief, and Sabrina, a former fortune-teller. Havid is illiterate but has the intention of repenting and wants to change his fate to become a good person. Meanwhile, Sabrina had previously encountered Haji Husin and Zidan in the time tunnel before they all meet in the real world. Over time, Ustād Addin develops an interest in Sabrina, and vice versa, until they finally decide to propose to each other at the end of the season. Their marriage moment is shown in the first episode of the third season.

In their journey through the time tunnel in the third season, Haji Husin and his students encounter various unique events and characters, indirectly imparting valuable lessons in embracing better life values. From the story of the shroud thief, a small trader whose prayers are more effective than the mosque's imam, an honest young man troubled by a single orange, Mpu Gandrung, a distant relative of Mpu Gandring who crafted the dagger, a peculiar religious leader named Aa Gyman, a Satanic sorcerer whose mystical business misleads others, and many other tales. Meanwhile, Havid and Jambrong, two of Haji Husin's students who also serve as mosque caretakers, develop feelings for a girl named Adinda. Their daily lives at the mosque are filled with various tricks and schemes as they compete for the affection of this young lady. Ultimately, at the end of the season, Adinda chooses Havid as her life partner.

At the beginning of the fourth season, Sabrina, the wife of Ustād Addin, becomes pregnant and becomes very sensitive. Being a responsible husband and expectant father, Ustād Addin tries to fulfill his wife's cravings. Towards the end of the season, another surprise unfolds. Jagur, a former prisoner and a friend of Jambrong and Havid, expresses his desire to repent and become a student of Haji Husin. Although Havid and Jambrong initially have concerns due to Jagur's criminal past, they soon realize they were wrong. Jagur genuinely repents, and to demonstrate his sincerity, he even asks Zidan to remove the tattoo on his arm. Haji Husin accepts Jagur as a student, and he continues his journey towards redemption.

In the fifth season, Havid and Jambrong, who are both married, are given new assignments as plantation managers funded by a mosque foundation. Jagur takes on the role of mosque keeper. Meanwhile, Ustād Addin modernizes his time machine equipment, which can now be controlled via a laptop. With the devices he has developed, he can send his friends anywhere and at any time. Sabrina gives birth to a baby boy named Firdaus.

In the sixth and final season, the story of Lorong Waktu focuses more on family issues. Firdaus, the son of Ustād Addin and Sabrina, has now reached school age, and Sabrina is preoccupied with dealing with her son's mischievous behavior. Haji Husin, growing older, still harbors hope of finding love again, as all his beloved students are now occupied with their own families. He then meets a woman named Aini, hoping that she will be the last love of his life. Meanwhile, Havid and Jambrong have successfully established a plantation with the support of a mosque foundation. Jagur, who recently got married, strives to create a happy and harmonious family life.

== Cast ==
=== Main characters ===
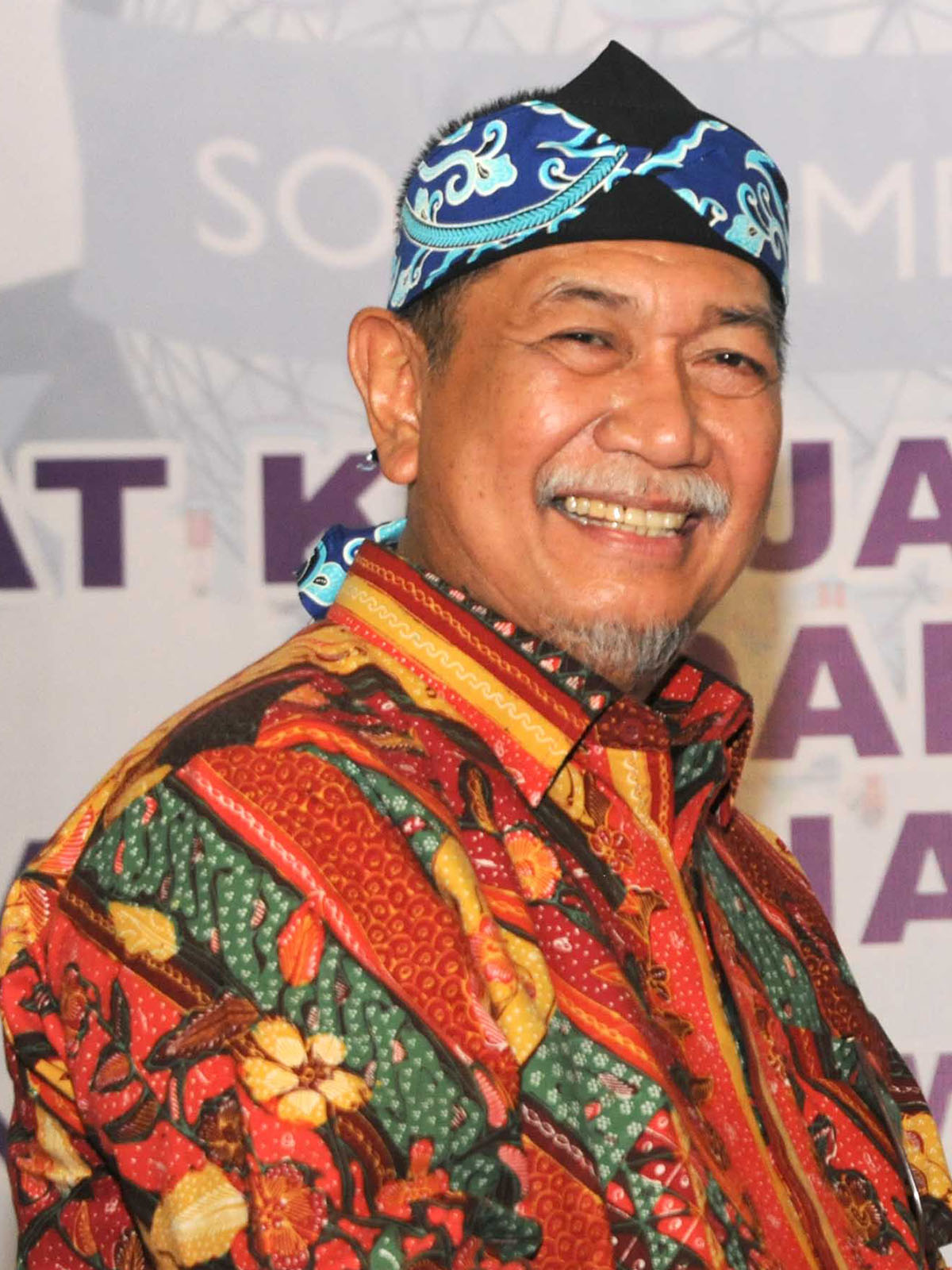
Deddy Mizwar as Haji Husin.

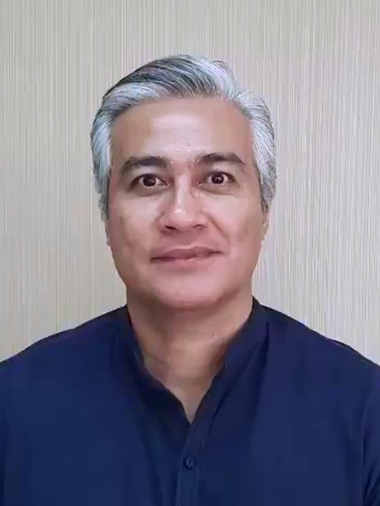
Adjie Pangestu as Ustād Addin in season 1.

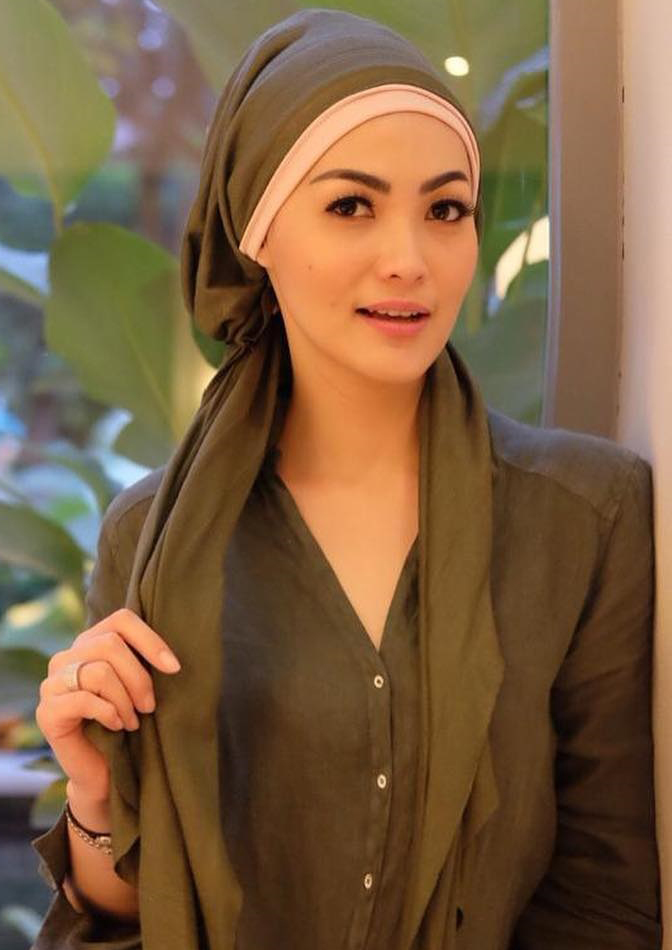
Christy Jusung as Sabrina in season 2–4.

- Haji Husin — The origin of Haji Husin is unknown. In the second episode of the first season, when he was young, he worked as a cook during the pre-independence era of Indonesia. He is a mosque keeper who has several students, including Ustād Addin, Zidan, Sabrina, Havid, Jagur, and Jambrong. It is mentioned that his wife has passed away. In one of the episodes of the second season, Haji Husin's best friend, Kyai Firman, provides a clue that Haji Husin had repented before going on the pilgrimage and decided to deepen his knowledge of Islam. Haji Husin is portrayed by Deddy Mizwar from the first season to the sixth season.
- Ustād Addin — Haji Husin's adopted son. Being an orphan since childhood, he received guidance from Haji Husin and received formal education, eventually becoming a computer engineer. He is the inventor and developer of the time tunnel program. Ustād Addin is married to a former fortune-teller named Sabrina. In the first season, Ustād Addin was played by Adjie Pangestu, in the second season by Dicky Chandra, and from the third season to the sixth season, he was portrayed by Hefri Olifian.
- Zidan — A student in a madrasa run by Haji Husin and Ustād Addin. He accidentally becomes involved in the time machine project when he hides in Ustād Addin's laboratory, and as a result, Ustād Addin accidentally sends him to the year 1945. Haji Husin comes to his aid. Zidan is close friends with Havid and Jambrong. The character of Zidan is portrayed by Jourast Jordy from the first season to the sixth season.
- Sabrina — A former paranormal and fortune-teller who Haji Husin and Zidan encounter in the time tunnel. She is on the verge of being attacked by robbers when Haji Husin and Zidan come to her rescue. Initially, Haji Husin, who is a widower, develops feelings for Sabrina, but he later realizes that Ustād Addin, his student, also has feelings for her. Haji Husin decides to step back. Eventually, Sabrina marries Ustād Addin, and they have a child together. In the series, Sabrina is portrayed by Christy Jusung from season two to four, Aditya Novika in season five, and Zaskia Adya Mecca in season six.
- Havid — A former thief who repented and became a student of Haji Husin. In the first few episodes of the second season, Havid tries to conceal the fact that he is illiterate and unable to count. However, his secret is eventually revealed when Haji Husin discovers that he cannot give correct change to a buyer at the mosque cooperative. In the third season, Havid meets his future wife, Adinda, who was previously pursued by Jambrong. Havid's character is portrayed by Opie Kumis from season two to season six.
- Jambrong — A former "preman" (gangster) who repents and becomes a student of Haji Husin. He is a close friend of Havid and Jagur, and his character is introduced in the third season. In the storyline, Jambrong has a rivalry with Havid for the affections of Adinda. However, he eventually marries Vira. Jambrong's character is portrayed by Ramdhani Qubil AJ from season three to season six.
- Jagur — A former criminal convict who repents and becomes a student of Haji Husin. When he first appears, he is rejected by his former friends, Havid and Jambrong. In order to demonstrate his sincerity in repentance, Jagur asks Zidan to help him remove his tattoo. The character of Jagur is portrayed by Asrul Dahlan from the end of the fourth season to the sixth season, with a distinctive Batak accent reflecting the actor's hometown origin.

=== Recurring ===
- Aura — An orphan girl who had a crush on Ustād Addin in the first season. She competed with Lestari, who also liked Ustād Addin. However, for one reason or another, neither of these two girls was chosen by Ustād Addin to be his wife. The role was played by Lenia Masagantha.
- Lestari — A girl had a crush on Ustād Addin in season one. She competed with Aura, who also liked Ustād Addin. However, for one reason or another, neither of these two girls was chosen by Ustād Addin to be his wife. The role was played by Irma Safitri.
- Intan — A girl who has been a friend of Ustād Addin since childhood. Ustād Addin asked her to pretend to be his girlfriend to make Sabrina jealous. However, not wanting to cause any major issues, Intan eventually revealed the truth to Sabrina and urged Ustād Addin to apologize to her. Later, Intan appeared as Sabrina's companion during the marriage proposal ceremony organized by Ustād Addin. The character Intan only appeared in the second season and was played by Fitri Kurnia.
- Zidan's Parents — Zidan's father works as an engineer, while Zidan's mother is a housewife. In the second season, it was explained that Zidan's mother was a village head, suggesting that her husband was a civil servant. The character of Zidan's father was played by Diaz Erlangga in seasons one to three, Hedi Yunus in season four, and Tabah Penemuan in season five. On the other hand, the character of Zidan's mother is played by Anggia Jelita.
- Zidan's Grandparents — They appeared in the fourth episode of the first season, expressing annoyance towards Zidan's father and mother for their infrequent visits. The characters of Zidan's grandparents were played by Wingky Harun and Indriana Indriyanti.
- Kyai Firman — A senior cleric who became a teacher of repentance for Haji Husin and later became the unofficial adoptive parent of Sabrina, bringing her together with Haji Husin and Ustād Addin. The character was portrayed by Eman Sulaeman.
- Dukun Setan — A black magic sorcerer who claims to possess supernatural powers and the ability to solve any problem. He is portrayed as an antagonist character who constantly opposes the good intentions of Haji Husin and his students. He first appeared in the second season under the name Dukun Sakti before being renamed to Dukun Setan in the third season. The character of Dukun Setan is portrayed by Opik Amada.
- Jin Hitam — A supernatural entity that constantly disrupts the faith of believers. It first appeared in the second season and forms a friendship with Dukun Setan in the fifth season. The character of Jin Hitam is portrayed by Ali Bustomi.
- Adinda — Havid's wife made her first appearance in the third season and also became a target of affection from Jambrong. The character was played by Irma De Vanty from season three to season five and later portrayed by Irma Annisa in season six.
- Jamil and his wife — Adinda's parents, Jamil and his wife, were introduced in the third season. Jamil, who was a close friend of Haji Husin in their youth, was portrayed by Gito Rollies. His wife's character was played by Elly Ermawati.
- Vira — Jambrong's wife made her first appearance in the fifth season. Alongside Adinda, she is entrusted with managing a food court that is run by the mosque foundation. The character of Vira was initially played by Ayu Pratiwi in the fifth season and later portrayed by Mega Yunia in the sixth season.
- Sofia — She is the sister of Zidan's mother and experienced domestic problems with her husband, which eventually led to divorce. However, her husband later asked for reconciliation. Haji Husin intends to assist her in this matter by suggesting that she get married again so she can remarry her ex-husband. The character is portrayed by Inneke Koesherawati.
- Jardin — Jambrong's friend who sought consultation with Haji Husin regarding writing a book. He developed a crush on Sabrina, prompting Jambrong to remind him that Sabrina was already married. Jardin's character only appeared in the third season and was played by Agus Kuncoro.
- Firdaus — The son of Ustād Addin and Sabrina, made his first appearance as a baby in the fifth season. It was later revealed in the sixth season that he had grown up and become an elementary school student. The character of baby Fidaus was portrayed by Ferdiansyah, while the portrayal of little Firdaus was done by Emir Alviandri Akram.
- Jagur's mother — Appeared in the fifth season. She came because her son asked her to propose to Annisa. She brought a 'souvenir', which was later used as a dowry for her son—a gold bar. This character is played by Cut Harilda with a distinctive Batak accent, even though the actress is from Aceh.
- Annisa — Jambrong's younger sister, who appears in the fifth season, marries Jagur and later assists her husband in managing a plantation business funded by a mosque foundation. The character of Annisa is played by Linda Leona.
- Anjas — A plantation employee who is under the supervision of Havid and Jambrong. Has a physical disability, has difficulty speaking clearly and is too innocent. This character appeared in the fifth season and was played by Chairul Yusuf.
- Aini — An agricultural businesswoman who expresses interest in becoming a partner in the plantation managed by the trio of Havid, Jambrong, and Jagur. As time goes on and she frequently consults with Haji Husin, the two develop a close relationship, and Haji Husin's desire to marry her emerges. However, Aini's parents believe that Haji Husin is too old. This character only appeared in the sixth season and was played by Cheche Kirani.
- Engkong Icung and his wife — A toy balloon seller, who was kicked out by his wife due to household problems, then approached Haji Husin to request acceptance as a mosque caretaker. The character of Engkong Icung is played by Sujarwo, while his wife is played by Aty Cancer Zein. The two characters only appear in the sixth season.

=== Other characters ===
- Superman — Appearing in one episode in the first season, is depicted as being old and planning to retire. Played by Pak Bendot.
- Prince Diponegoro — Appears in one episode in the first season, played by Andra PSP.
- Malin Kundang — Appeared in the 10th and 11th episodes of the second season, played by Septian Dwi Cahyo.
- Gadjah Mada — Appears in the 18th and 19th episodes of the second season, played by Diding Yacob.
- Husband and wife pithecanthropus erectus — Appears in the 19th episode in the second season, being told as the ancestor of Zidan's parents. Played by Diaz Erlangga and Anggia Jelita.
- Jaka Tarub — Appears in one episode in the second season, played by Fachrul Rozy.
- Nyi Roro Kidul — Appears in two episodes in the fourth season, played by Aldona Toncic.

Several actors and actresses, including Anwar Fuady, Rahman Yakob, Pietrajaya Burnama, Ujang Ronda, Ali Bustomi, Eddies Adelia, Rifat Sungkar, Rachel Amanda, and Senandung Nacita, have also portrayed one-off characters in one or two episodes of the series.

== Production ==
=== Development ===
Lorong Waktu is the first religious television series in Indonesia to incorporate the concept of science fiction. According to Deddy Mizwar, the storyline is based on Surah Al-Asr from Al-Quran, which emphasizes the significance of time. Mizwar also explained that the concept of Lorong Waktu revolves around the idea that all humans are at a loss, except those who consistently perform good deeds and encourage one another in truth and patience. Additionally, another inspiration for the series is the Prophet Muhammad's Isra and Mi'raj, a miraculous journey during which the Prophet traveled to Sidrat al-Muntaha (the Lote Tree of the Utmost Boundary) in a single night. Many of the Prophet's companions initially doubted the possibility of such a journey, but it was ultimately proven to be feasible through the permission of Allah.

In the process of developing the scenario for each episode, Mizwar would submit it to Wahyu H.S. As an initiative, various fictional elements were incorporated into the series, such as Zidan encountering historical figures like Prince Diponegoro, Superman, and Malin Kundang. These additions were intended to infuse comedy into the storyline, making it interesting while still adhering to the principle of da'wah.

While it is noted that some people perceive similarities between Lorong Waktu and mainstream works like H. G. Wells' The Time Machine and Steven Spielberg's Back to the Future franchise, it is important to highlight that Lorong Waktu brings a unique approach to Indonesian television. Although the concept of time travel and the use of a time machine have been explored in various forms of media, including the 1990s series Quantum Leap, the introduction of such a concept in an Indonesian religious television series was indeed a new and distinctive endeavor. Despite drawing inspiration from existing works, Lorong Waktu managed to offer a fresh perspective within the context of Indonesian television.

Abdul Kadir served as the director for the first season of the series, directing 20 episodes. Sadly, this series marked his final film work before his passing in 2000. From the 21st episode of the first season until the final episode of the sixth season, the directorial role was taken over by Aldisar Syafar. However, Mizwar also directed several episodes when Syafar was unavailable.

=== Casting ===
Out of the six seasons of the Lorong Waktu series, only two characters, Haji Husin played by Deddy Mizwar and Zidan played by Jourast Jordy, remained the same from beginning to end. For Jordy, his role as Zidan is considered a launching pad for a successful career, even though he resigned from acting in 2012. Jordy mentioned that he was offered the role of Zidan by Mizwar after securing the second position in the 1999 Abang None Cilik event. At that time, he wasn't fluent in reading the script and required guidance from the production team.

The character of Ustād Addin went through several cast changes. Adjie Pangestu, who previously appeared in Starvision's Mawar Sejati Mawar Berduri, played the role in the first season. However, due to his long contract with Prima Entertainment for Misteri Nini Pelet, he couldn't continue for the second season and was replaced by Dicky Chandra. After the second season ended, Chandra chose to resign because "his son did not want his father to act as a father to someone else" in relation to the storyline where Ustād Addin marries Sabrina in the third season. Hefri Olifian was then selected as the actor for Ustād Addin from the third season to the sixth season. During that time, Olifian also appeared in Duk-Duk Mong alongside Jaja Mihardja and took part in several television film productions.

The character of Sabrina, who appears in the second season, is played by Christy Jusung. Sabrina was introduced as a replacement for the characters Aura and Lestari, portrayed by Lenia Masagantha and Irma Safitri, respectively, in the first season. The plot of their characters ended unclear, although in the last episode of the first season, Ustād Addin had intended to choose one of them as a potential wife. As a "competitor" to Sabrina, the character Intan, played by Fitri Kurnia, was introduced. For Jusung herself, the role of Sabrina was instrumental in establishing her name as an actress because she had previously mostly played extras or cameo roles, particularly in several episodes of Warkop Millenium series. In the fifth season, due to contract clause issues, Jusung's role was replaced by Aditya Novika. As Novika portrayed a Muslim character, she refrained from accepting model photo sessions for "sexy clothes". It is believed that this clause led to Jusung's resignation from Lorong Waktu since she had received an offer for a sexy role in the sitcom Sial-Sial Mujur. In the sixth season, the role of Sabrina was taken on by Zaskia Adya Mecca.

The addition of the character Havid, portrayed by Opie Kumis, as a former thief who appears from the second season, follows a pattern scheme that is repeated in the subsequent seasons by introducing new characters with a "villain conversion" storyline. In the third season, Jambrong, played by Ramdhani Qubil AJ, appeared as a former thug, and in the last episode of the fourth season, Jagur, played by Asrul Dahlan, appeared as a former prisoner who later became one of the main characters in the fifth season. One characteristic of the addition of Haji Husin's students' characters is that they have more comedic roles. Participating as actors in Lorong Waktu was considered a blessing for all three of them. For example, Kumis has transformed his life since portraying Havid, and the honorarium he received was used to fund his mother's hajj pilgrimage. Qubil and Dahlan, through their roles in Lorong Waktu, experienced career advancements in the acting field. Dahlan, in particular, continues his acting career under the banner of Demi Gisela Citra Sinema, often taking on similar roles, especially in the series Para Pencari Tuhan.

=== Shooting location ===
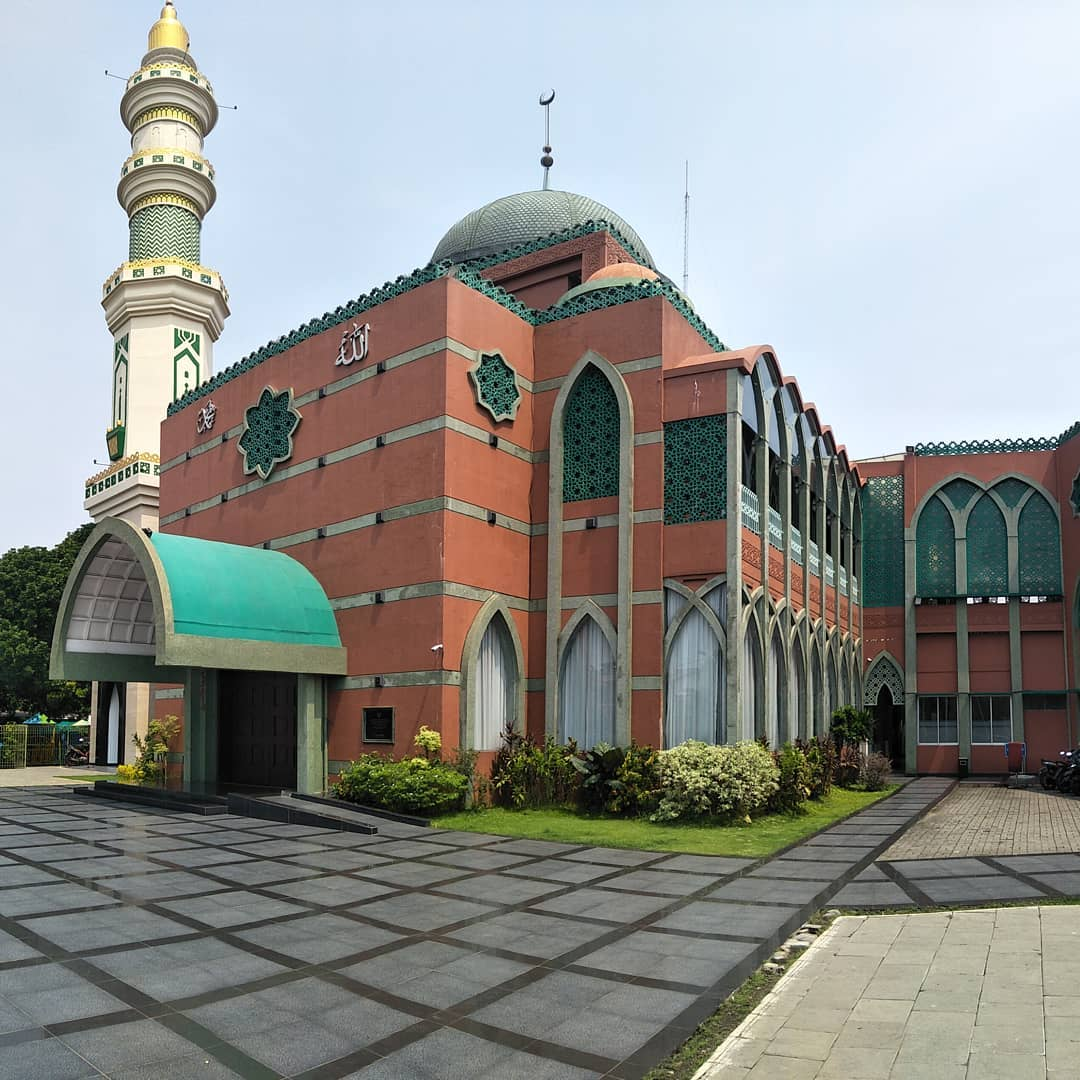
The Baitussalam Mosque in the Billy Moon Complex, East Jakarta, was the location for shooting from the second to sixth season.

For the first season, the shooting location of Lorong Waktu was set at the Siti Rawani Mosque situated in the Nusa Indah Raya Villa Complex, Jatiasih, Bekasi, West Java. Additionally, Zidan's house and the areas where other characters appear in each episode were also filmed in the housing area within this complex.

From the second season to the sixth season, the shooting location shifted to the Baitussalam Grand Mosque, situated in the Billy Moon Complex, Duren Sawit, East Jakarta. This mosque was chosen when one of the crew members from Demi Gisela Citra Sinema accidentally discovered the location. After careful consideration by Deddy Mizwar, a proposal was submitted to seek permission to use the mosque as a shooting location. At the time (in 2000), the mosque had recently undergone renovation. Since being featured as a location in Lorong Waktu, the mosque has gained a new nickname, the Lorong Waktu Mosque. The room used as the time machine laboratory is a multipurpose room that remained vacant after the mosque's renovation.

Several mosque administrators were also involved in the production as extras. One of the administrators, Abdul Latief, mentioned that besides being an extra, he had the opportunity to serve as a muezzin, recording the call to prayer that was later used in episodes of the series.

=== Music ===
Anes Bali served as the music director and composer of the main theme song for the first season and continued in that role from the third season to the sixth season. He collaborated with singer Ina Bartheen for these seasons. For the second season, the theme song was composed by Chossy Pratama, and the vocals were performed by Ayu Giri Anjani. In each episode, the music alternated between Tikko Supratikwo, Koko Thole, and Anes Bali himself to provide the musical backdrop.

Opening song

- Maka Jadilah — Used in the first season, created by Anes Bali and sung by Ina with Anes Bali.
- KepadaMu Allah — Used in the second season, by Chossy Pratama and sung by Ayu Giri Anjani.
- Karunia — Used in the third season, created by Anes Bali and sung by Ina with Anes Bali.
- Bening — Used in the fourth season, created by Anes Bali and sung by Ina with Anes Bali.
- Bismillah — Used in the fifth season, created by Anes Bali and sung by Ina with Anes Bali.
- Dibawah Langitmu — Used in the sixth season, created by Anes Bali and sung by Ina with Anes Bali.

Closing song

- Wal Ashri — Used in the sixth season, created by Anes Bali and sung by Ina with Anes Bali.

== Marketing ==
The companies that contracted Deddy Mizwar as their commercials participated as sponsors in this series, including Sarong Atlas, Promag and Yamaha.

The second season featured the most product placements including for information technology sponsors such as Acer (for desktop computers), Tandberg (headsets) and Samsung (monitors and cellular phones). In order to avoid being too flashy when shown on television, the production team chose to censor (blurring) the brands that appeared even though they were physically legible by viewers.

== Broadcast ==
From the first season to the sixth season, Lorong Waktu was aired on SCTV, including reruns. Seasons one to five were specifically aired during the month of Ramadan. In the first season, the series was broadcast at 4:30 PM. In the second season, it moved to the 5 PM time slot. The third season was aired after breaking the fast, at 6:30 PM. From the fourth to the fifth season, the broadcast was postponed to the late afternoon, with a time slot of 3 PM. Finally, for the sixth season, the series aired from April to July, every Saturday and Sunday, at 6 PM. This season marked the end of the previous Ramadan-specific scheduling scheme. In 2021 the series was re-broadcast by Ajwa TV along with streaming on the vidio.com site, both of which are still the same parent company with SCTV under the Emtek banner.

TVRI re-aired the third season of Lorong Waktu in the month of Ramadan in 2003. To avoid clashing with the fourth season, which was airing on SCTV in the afternoon, TVRI scheduled the re-run in the morning at 8 AM.

TPI (now known as MNCTV) also aired the fourth season of Lorong Waktu during the month of Ramadan in 2007. The broadcast time slot for the series on TPI was at 12:00 noon.

For city local television, Padjadjaran TV from Bandung has aired the second and third seasons of this series in 2008-2009 with a time slot at 6 PM.

== Reception ==
=== Critical response ===
In the view of some conservative Muslim viewers, Lorong Waktu has received a negative response especially because it is considered to have deviated from the Islamic religious tradition regarding time and humans themselves cannot see and change the past or the future. The critics of this series take references from Emha Ainun Nadjib's statement which says that "life is like we are walking in the dark, we will not know what will happen a minute later." Some ustād and Islamic cleric consider that Lorong Waktu is irrelevant to the Quran, which explains that humans cannot see or change their future with a time machine.

One of the episodes that was considered very controversial in Lorong Waktu is the fifth episode of the second season, where Haji Husin and Zidan save Sabrina from an assassination attempt by robbers who are trying to enter her house For the critics, this episode is considered misleading, particularly regarding the understanding of aqidah among Muslims. It portrays the notion that humans can alter their destiny through the existence of a time machine, which contradicts the belief that destiny is ultimately determined by a higher power and cannot be changed by human intervention.

On the other hand, Lorong Waktu received a positive response from many Muslim viewers. Its unique combination of technological advancement and religious preaching made it stand out among Indonesian television shows. The series' simple and easily understandable story concept appealed to viewers of all ages. As a result, it is often regarded as the best Indonesian religious series of all time. The inclusion of comedic characters like Havid, Jagur, and Jambrong in the series adds a refreshing and less rigid element to the process of preaching being conveyed. Their presence brings a lightheartedness to the show, making the overall preaching experience more relatable and enjoyable for the audience.

According to Ustaz Wahyul Afif Al-Ghafiqi's assessment, the form of da'wah conveyed in Lorong Waktu is considered beneficial. This relates to children as the target audience for da'wah, where children find it easier to comprehend fantasy content. This serves as evidence of someone's creativity in promoting Islam, as long as that creativity does not deviate from the right path. Some viewers have expressed that they feel more comfortable watching religious television series like Lorong Waktu because the delivery of the da'wah material is easily digestible compared to the typically rigid conventional lecture methods.

According to Vice, the series is one of the best Ramadan television series in Indonesia in the late 1990s to the early 2000s. Kompas said Lorong Waktu is the most missed religious television series by its viewers and is considered never stale, even though it has been completed since 2006. Meanwhile, CNN Indonesia called Lorong Waktu as a prima donna series for Indonesian television viewers in the late 1990s.

Jourast Jordy mentioned that there was a viewer who converted to Islam after watching the 'simple but powerful da'wah' presented in one of the episodes of Lorong Waktu. Despite the life-changing decision, the individual had to make sacrifices, including separating from their family, in order to embark on a new life based on their newfound belief.

Singer Isyana Sarasvati mentioned that Lorong Waktu is one of the television series that she never missed watching on television when she was a child.

=== Accolades ===
Awards	Year	Category	Results	Ref.
Bandung Film Festival	2000	Praiseworthy TV Series	Won	
Anugerah Syiar Ramadan	2000	Best Program for Movies and TV Series	Won	

== Remake ==
Deddy Mizwar stated that Lorong Waktu will be remake in the format of animated cartoon series. The new series was released in the month of Ramadan 2019 on SCTV.

Following the enthusiasm and requests from fans regarding Lorong Waktu, in 2025, Deddy Mizwar decided to produce a new version of the series. This latest version takes a soft reboot approach and began airing on SCTV on March 1, 2025, coinciding with the start of Ramadan 1446 Hijri.
