= Lorong Waktu (2019 TV series) =

Indonesian animated series

- Lorong Waktu poster on Vidio.com
- Genre: Animation; Science fiction; Religion; Comedy
- Based on: Lorong Waktu by Deddy Mizwar
- Written by: Amiruddin Olland
- Directed by: Deddy Mizwar; Freddy Nindan
- Voices of: Deddy Mizwar; Santosa Amin; Novalina Nasution
- Opening theme: Waktu by Novalina Nasution
- Ending theme: Waktu by Novalina Nasution
- Composer: Yovial Virgi
- Country of origin: Indonesia
- Original language: Indonesian
- No. of seasons: 1
- No. of episodes: 18

Production
- Executive producers: Deddy Mizwar; Arnas Irmal
- Producer: Ramlan Permana
- Running time: 8 minutes
- Production company: CookIt Studio

Original release
- Network: SCTV (2019); Vidio (2019–present)
- Release: May 11 – June 2, 2019

Lorong Waktu (literally translated as The Time Passage) is an Indonesian animated television series with the theme of religion and science fiction produced by CookIt Studio which is the animation division of Demi Gisela Citra Sinema. This series aired on SCTV in May 2019 to coincide with the month of Ramadan 1440 H. This series itself is a loose adaptation of television series with same title which was produced from 1999 to 2006. In the Anugerah Syiar Ramadan 2020 award organized by the Indonesian Broadcasting Commission (KPI), the Indonesian Ulema Council (MUI) and the Ministry of Youth and Sports (Kemenpora), this series won the award for the category "Best Animated Film Program".

Currently, all episodes of the Lorong Waktu animated series can be watched for free on Vidio.com, which is also in the same group as SCTV under the Emtek banner.

== Plot ==
Lorong Waktu follows the adventures of Ustād Addin, Haji Husin, and a young student named Zidan. Ustād Addin, an orphan with a knack for information technology, invents a time machine that transports Haji Husin and Zidan on journeys through the past and future.

The animated series closely mirrors its television predecessor, which aired from 1999 to 2006. Notable changes in the animated version include the setting of the mosque, initially inspired by the Siti Rawani Mosque (used in the first season of the TV series, later replaced by the Baitussalam Grand Mosque from seasons two to six), and Ustād Addin's character, portrayed as single (similar to his depiction in the first and second seasons of the TV series before marrying Sabrina).

The animated depictions of Haji Husin, Ustād Addin, and Zidan are based on their TV series counterparts, resembling Deddy Mizwar, Adjie Pangestu (who played Ustād Addin in the first season of the TV series), and Jourast Jordy, respectively.

== Cast ==
- Deddy Mizwar as Haji Husin
- Santosa Amin as Ustād Addin
- Novalina Nasution as Zidan
- Jheni Rinjo as Zidan's Mother
- Mirna Haryati as Thoif / Ibu Aisyah
- Vika Damayanti as Ramdan
- Kuswayanti Worodewi as Lukman / Ibu Ramdan

== Production ==
=== Development ===
The development of the Lorong Waktu animated series began in December 2018. At that time, Deddy Mizwar, the producer, listened to numerous suggestions from fans. Some fans felt that Lorong Waktu should be remade in a new version. On the other hand, others expressed boredom with the Para Pencari Tuhan series, which had become monotonous after the resignation of key actors such as Trio Bajaj, Agus Kuncoro, and Zaskia Adya Mecca. However, recreating Lorong Waktu faced challenges, particularly finding a replacement for Jourast Jordy to portray Zidan's character. Unable to resolve these casting issues, Mizwar opted to produce Lorong Waktu as an animated series instead, as an alternative to satisfy the audience's desire.

Deddy Mizwar stated that the storyline of Lorong Waktu is based on the Quranic Surah Al-Asr, which emphasizes the concept of time. According to Mizwar, the essence of the Lorong Waktu story revolves around the idea that all humans are in a state of loss, except those who consistently perform good deeds, encourage truth, and demonstrate patience. Additionally, another significant inspiration for the series is the Prophet Muhammad's Isra and Mi'raj. Many of the Prophet's companions initially doubted that such a journey to Sidrat al-Muntaha in a single night could occur, but it was indeed possible through Allah's permission.

While not groundbreaking, some individuals perceive Lorong Waktu to draw inspiration from well-known works like H. G. Wells' The Time Machine and Steven Spielberg's Back to the Future franchise. There are also parallels with the concept of time travel seen in the 1990s series Quantum Leap. Although the concept of Lorong Waktu may not be entirely original, it represents a fresh approach for Indonesian television.

=== Casting ===
Of all the actors and actresses who played a role in the Lorong Waktu television series, only Deddy Mizwar continued to play the same character as the voice of Haji Husin for the animated version. For the characters of Ustaz Addin and Zidan, the voices are filled by professional dubbers. Ustaz Addin is voiced by Santosa Amin, who also has experience as dubber for Indonesian version of Suneo Honekawa in Doraemon and SpongeBob SquarePants in SpongeBob SquarePants. Meanwhile, the voice actor for Zidan is Novalina Nasution, who also to be the voice of Jimmy Neutron.

Several other famous voice actors who appear in this animated series include Jheni Rinjo as Zidan's mother. Jheni was previously famous as dubber for Sandy Cheeks in Indonesian version. In addition, there is also Mirna Haryati who has been a dubber for the Gundam series, Kuswayanti Woro Dewi who became a dubber for Korean dramas and Hana Bahagiana who is a dubber for Naruto Uzumaki's character in Naruto.

=== Music ===
Yovial Tri Purnomo Virgi is the music director for the animated series Lorong Time. Previously he was famous as a composer and music director for many films and television series since 2007.

The series' main theme is Waktu (Time), composed by Harry Budiman and sung by Novalina Nasution. This song was released on Apple Music on July 7, 2019.

== Episode ==
In total there have been 18 episodes produced with a duration of each episode is 8 minutes.

1. Zidan Rindu Kakek (Zidan Miss Grandpa)
2. Rindu Ka'bah (Miss the Kaaba)
3. Rantang Amanah (Trustworthiness)
4. Jaga Lisan (Keeping Speech)
5. Durian Runtuh (Windfall)
6. Sayang Ibu (Love Mother)
7. Allah Maha Pengasih (Allah the Most Gracious)
8. Adab Makan (Eating Etiquette)
9. Sepeda Impian (Dreaming About the Bicycle)
10. Terima Kasih Guru (Thank You My Teacher)
11. Tolong Menolong (Mutual Helping)
12. Mengubah Takdir (Change the Destiny)
13. Koruptor (Corruptor)
14. Malas Belajar (Lazy to Study)
15. Bismillah
16. Berbaik Sangka Kepada Allah (Be Good to Allah)
17. Menghafal Al-Qur'an (Memorizing the Qur'an)
18. Ngeprank (Practical Joke)

== Accolade ==
Award(s)	Year	Category	Result(s)	Ref.
Anugerah Syiar Ramadan	2020	Best Animated Film Program	Won	
