= Eman Sulaeman =

Indonesian cultural scholar, author and actor

- Born: Tubagus Eman Sulaeman; March 27, 1937; Rangkasbitung, Dutch East Indies
- Died: 28 June 2021 (aged 84); Bogor, West Java, Indonesia
- Other names: Eman Sulaiman
- Occupations: Historian, actor

Tubagus Eman Sulaeman, also often incorrectly spelled as Eman Sulaiman (1937 – 2021), was an Indonesian cultural scholar, author, and actor of Sundanese-Bantenese descent. He was widely recognized as one of Bogor's historians.

== Profile ==
Throughout his life, Sulaeman focused on preserving the cultural values and history of the Sundanese in both Bogor and Bogor Regency. His passion for history was deeply influenced by his mentor, Mas Ace Salmun Raksadikaria, who also hailed from Banten.

Sulaeman also frequently appeared in various film roles, including as a police officer in the Warkop's film Sabar Dulu Doong...!, which was filmed in Bogor. Additionally, he acted in several soap operas such as Lorong Waktu and 3 Sempruuul Mengejar Surga. He was also active in theater performances and drama programs broadcast on TVRI alongside Umar Machdam.

Sulaeman died on 28 June 2021, after battling asthma for a long time. He was buried in Bantar Kemang, Bogor.
