= Nyai Ahmad Dahlan =

National Hero of Indonesia (1872–1946)

- Portrait of Nyai Ahmad Dahlan
- Born: Siti Walidah; 1872; Kauman, Yogyakarta, Dutch East Indies
- Died: 31 May 1946 (aged 73–74); Kauman, Yogyakarta, Indonesia
- Resting place: Great Mosque of Kauman, Yogyakarta
- Occupation: Social worker
- Years active: 1914–1946
- Awards: National Hero of Indonesia

Siti Walidah (1872 – 31 May 1946), better known as Nyai Ahmad Dahlan, was a female emancipation figure, wife of Muhammadiyah founder Ahmad Dahlan, and National Hero of Indonesia.

== Biography ==
=== Early life ===
Nyai Ahmad Dahlan was born Siti Walidah in Kauman, Yogyakarta, in 1872 to Kyai Haji Muhammad Fadli, an ulama (Muslim religious leader) and member of the Sultanate of Yogyakarta; the area housed many religious figures from the palace. She was homeschooled in various aspects of Islam, including Arabic and the Qur'an; she read the Qur'an in the Jawi script.

Nyai Ahmad Dahlan married her cousin, Ahmad Dahlan, and had six children from this marriage. As he was busy developing the Islamic group Muhammadiyah at the time, she followed him in his travels. However, as some of Ahmad Dahlan's Reformationist views on Islam were considered radical, the couple at times received threats; for example, before a scheduled trip to Banyuwangi in East Java they received death threats from conservatives there.

=== Sopo Tresno and Aisyiyah ===
In 1914 she established the prayer group Sopo Tresno (literally Who Loves); she and her husband took turns leading the group in reading the Qur'an and discussing its meaning. Soon she began focusing on passages in the Qur'an that dealt with women's issues. By teaching reading and writing through the group, the couple slowed the Christianization of Java through schools sponsored by the colonial government.

With her husband and several other Muhammadiyah leaders, Nyai Ahmad Dahlan discussed the formalization of Sopo Tresno as a women's group. Rejecting the first proposal, Fatimah, they decided on the name Aisyiyah, derived from Muhammad's wife Aisha. The new group was formalized on 22 April 1917, with Nyai Ahmad Dahlan as its head. Five years later the organization became a part of Muhammadiyah.

Through Aisyiyah, Nyai Ahmad Dahlan founded girls' schools and dormitories, as well as literacy and Islamic education programs for women; she also preached against forced marriage. She would also visit branches throughout Java. In contrast to the traditionally patriarchal Javanese society, Nyai Ahmad Dahlan argued that women were meant to be their husbands' partners. Aisyayah's schools were influenced by Ahmad Dahlan's educational ideology of the Four Tenets (Catur Pusat): education at home, education at school, education in society, and education at places of worship.

=== Leadership and later life ===
After Ahmad Dahlan's death in 1923, Nyai Ahmad Dahlan continued to be active in Muhammadiyah and Aisyiyah. In 1926, she chaired the fifteenth Muhammadiyah Congress in Surabaya; she was the first woman to chair such a conference. As a result of widespread media coverage in newspapers such as Pewarta Surabaya and Sin Tit Po, more influential women joined Aisyiyah, while branches opened on other islands in the archipelago.

Nyai Ahmad Dahlan continued to lead Aisyiyah until 1934. During the Japanese occupation, with Aisyiyah banned from working with women by the Order of the Japanese Military in Java and Madura of 10 September 1943, she worked at schools and struggled to keep the students from being forced to worship the sun and sing Japanese songs. During the Indonesian National Revolution, she ran soup kitchens out of her home for soldiers and promoted military service amongst her former students. She also participated in discussions about the war with General Sudirman and President Sukarno.

Nyai Ahmad Dahlan died at 1 p.m. local time (UTC+7) on 31 May 1946 and was buried behind the Great Mosque of Kauman in Yogyakarta four hours later. State Secretary Abdoel Gaffar Pringgodigdo and Minister of Religion Rasyidi represented the government at her funeral.

== Legacy ==
On 10 November 1971, Nyai Ahmad Dahlan was declared a National Hero of Indonesia by President Suharto with Presidential Decree Number 42/TK of 1971; Ahmad Dahlan had been declared a National Hero ten years earlier. The award was accepted by her granddaughter, M Wardan. She has been compared to women's rights advocate Kartini and guerrillas Cut Nyak Dhien and Cut Nyak Meutia.

In Hanung Bramantyo's 2010 film Sang Pencerah (The Enlightener), Nyai Ahmad Dahlan was played by Zaskia Adya Mecca; Ahmad Dahlan was played by Lukman Sardi.
