= Mustaka =

Islamic architecture elements

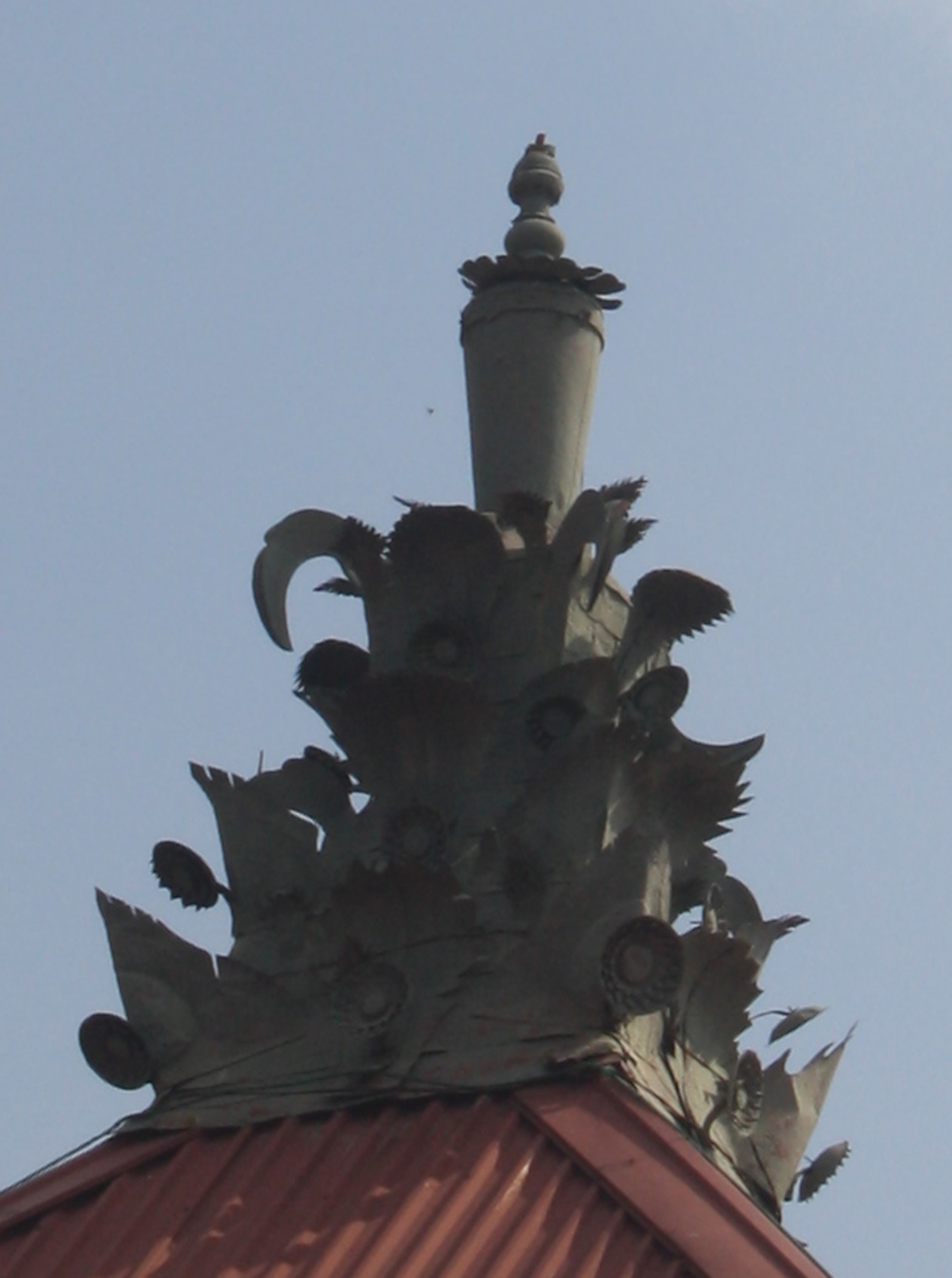
Mustaka on the top of Kauman Great Mosque.

A Mustaka is the finial on the roof of a mosque, typically located at the very top of the tajug—the traditional pyramidal or tiered roof form commonly used in Javanese and Southeast Asian architecture.

In the Javanese language, the word *mustaka* translates to "head". Symbolically, the mustaka represents the crown or highest point of the structure, echoing the shape of a royal headdress or crown often seen in traditional wayang (shadow puppet) performances. This association reinforces the idea of the mosque as a sacred space, with the mustaka marking its spiritual and architectural peak.

The forms and construction techniques of mustaka can vary depending on regional traditions and cultural influences. In Yogyakarta, for example, mustaka are typically made of metal. There is no historical evidence suggesting that clay was used in the region for this purpose, although clay mustaka were traditionally employed in other areas like Cirebon and Bali. In Yogyakarta, metal mustaka are carefully cut, soldered, and crafted to resemble a crown, highlighting their symbolic role. Some are painted, adding an additional layer of artistic expression and identity. For instance, the mustaka found atop the buildings in the Kraton Ngayogyakarta Hadiningrat are almost all painted a distinctive dark red color.

The placement of a mustaka on a building signifies that the structure serves a sacred or ceremonial function. In recent times, however, the traditional mustaka has sometimes been replaced by domes inspired by Persian or Indian architectural styles, reflecting evolving design preferences and cultural exchanges.

== See also ==
- Indonesian mosques
