= Christy Jusung =

Indonesian actress

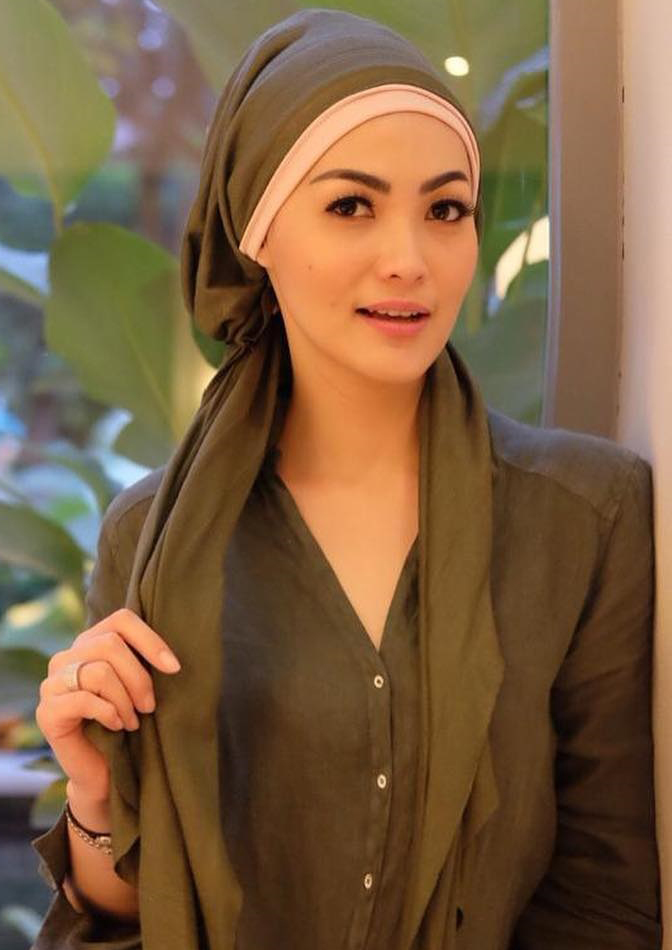
- Born: 12 December 1982 (age 43); Jakarta, Indonesia
- Education: Trisakti University
- Occupations: Actress, model, presenter
- Years active: 1999–now
- Spouses: Hengky Kurniawan (m. 2008; div. 2012) Jay Alatas (m. 2013; div. 2014)
- Children: Bintang Pratama
- Parent(s): George Jusung; Juniarty Zulanifah

Christy Jusung (born 12 December 1982) is an Indonesian film and television Actor. She became widely known after playing the character Sabrina in the Ramadan television series Lorong Waktu in the early 2000s.

She started her career by playing a cameo role in the Warkop Millenium series in 1999. In addition, she has also played roles in several other productions, including O-Jekri, Tarzan Betawi, Perjaka, and Sial-Sial Mujur.

== Personal life ==
Christy Jusung is the daughter of George Jusung and Juniarty Zulanifah and is the second child of this couple. Her father is a Christian, while her mother is a Muslim. Jusung chose to follow her mother's beliefs. She married actor Hengky Kurniawan in 2008 and divorced in 2012. She later married Jay Alatas in 2013 but divorced in 2014.

== Filmography ==
=== Movies ===
- Lihat Boleh, Pegang Jangan (2010)

=== TV series ===
- Lorong Waktu (2000)
- O-Jekri (2003)
- Hidayah (Eps: Berani Mempermainkan Sumpah Mati Di Tabrak Truk) (2005)
- Hidayah (Eps: Jenazah Di Ganggu B*** Hutan Saat Akan Di Kubur) (2005)
- Hidayah (Eps: Azab Tukang Ojek Menabrak Usungan Mayat) (2005)
- Taubat (Eps: Ibu Ku Seorang Pembunuh) (2005)
- Hidayah (Eps: Suami Mati, Istri Gila Akibat Berselingkuh) (2006)
- Di Atas Sajadah Cinta (2006)
- Munajah Cinta (2008)
- Inayah (2009)
- Hanya Kamu 2 (2013)

=== Television movies ===
- Hadiah Terindah
- Awet Muda Yang Tak Berkah
- Burokonan Itu Ibuku
