= Para Pencari Tuhan =

- Created by: Deddy Mizwar (Season 1-6, 14-15); Zairin Zain (Season 8); Senandung Nacita (Season 7-13)
- Directed by: Deddy Mizwar; Kiki ZKR
- Starring: Deddy Mizwar; Udin Nganga; Asrul Dahlan; Jarwo Kwat; Anggia Jelita; Tora Sudiro; Raihan Khan; Angga Putra; Julian Kunto; Ricky Malau; Farisha Fasha
- Country of origin: Indonesia
- Original language: Indonesian
- No. of seasons: 19
- No. of episodes: 542

Production
- Producers: Deddy Mizwar (Season 1–6, 14–16); Zairin Zain (Season 8); Senandung Nacita (Season 7–13)
- Running time: 90 minutes (Season 1–6); 60 minutes (Season 7–present)
- Production company: Citra Sinema

Original release
- Network: SCTV; Vidio
- Release: 16 September 2007 – 20 March 2026

Para Pencari Tuhan (The Godseekers) is an Indonesian television series created by Deddy Mizwar. The series focuses on a musalla caretaker Bang Jack (portrayed by Deddy Mizwar) and people living around him as they learn to practice Islamic value in their lives. It is first aired on 16 September 2007. It is aired only every Holy month of Ramadan, during suhur on 03:00–04:30 WIB in Season 1–6, and 03:00–04:00 WIB in Season 7–present and during iftar on 18:00–19:00 WIB (in Season 1–6 and season 13) on SCTV. This show also features a Telequiz. As of 2025, the series had 511 episodes across sixteen seasons and had been renewed for the seventeenth. In 2023, it received a record for Longest Continuous Ramadan Religion Series from Indonesian World Records Museum.

== Premise ==
The series originally focuses on three ex-criminals, Chelsea, Barong, and Juki who have recently been released from prison and are unable to go back to their previous lives. They soon find themselves in a musalla and let its caretaker Bang Jack (portrayed by Deddy Mizwar) guide them. The series also has several subplots taking place in the same village, such as Ustad Ferry's job as a television presenter, the romance between Ferry's sister-in-law Aya and her old friend Azam, and the economic struggles of two best friends Udin and Asrul who have a mixed relationship with the rich businessman Jalal. Over the seasons, there are changes in the character lineup and eventually the original village is destroyed by a flood in the eleventh season. Later seasons focus on Bang Jack, Jalal, Udin and Asrul along with new characters in new settings.

== Cast ==
=== Main ===
==== Season 1 ====
- Deddy Mizwar as Ahmad Zakaria "Bang Jack", H. Husin Tabi'at (season 12), Nagabonar (season 12)
- Isa Bajaj as Juki (season 1–10)
- Melky Bajaj as Chelsea (season 1–10)
- Aden Bajaj as Barong (season 1–10)
- Zaskia Adya Mecca as Aya (season 1–8, 10–11; guest season 9)
- Akrie Patrio as Ustad Fery (season 1–11)
- Annisa Suci as Haifah (season 1–10, supporting season 11)
- Agus Kuncoro as Azam (season 1–11)
- Udin Nganga as Zulfikar Baharuddin "Udin"
- Jarwo Kwat as Ahmad Jalaluddin "Jalal"
- Asrul Dahlan as Asrul
- Artta Ivano as Kalila (supporting season 1, main season 2–11)
- Mira Zayra as Mira (supporting season 1–2, main season 3–12)
- Idrus Madani as Idrus "Pak RW" (supporting season 1–2, main season 3–11)
- Joes Terpase as Joes (supporting season 1–2, main season 3–12)
- Hakim Ahmad as Hakim (supporting season 1–2, main season 3–12)
- Irma Annisa as Bu Jalal (supporting season 1–5, main season 6–15)
- Turaekhan Roy as Roy (supporting season 1–7, main season 8–14)
- Maulana Firdaus as Maulana (supporting season 1–8, 10–11; main season 9)
- Yanto Tampan as Acip (supporting season 1–10, 12–13; main season 11)

==== Season 2–11 ====
- Tora Sudiro as Zulfikar Baha'uddin (season 2–3)
- Henidar Amroe as Widya (season 5–8, 10–11; guest season 9)
- Irma De Vanty as Herlina (season 5, supporting season 6–7)
- Erma Zarina as Loli (supporting season 5, main season 6–13)
- Slamet Rahardjo as Wijoyo (season 6–8, 10–11; guest season 9)
- Vitta Mariana as Heli (season 6–11)
- Fachri Albar as Fachri (supporting season 7, main season 8)
- Alfie Alfandy as Domino Febrianto (season 8–11)
- Teddy Syah as Azmi (season 10)
- Jaja Mihardja as Haji Jaja (season 10)
- Inneke Koesherawati as Dewi (season 10)
- Nurul Qomar as Haji Balotelli (season 11), Abah Nyinyi (season 12)

==== Season 12 ====
- Miqdad Addausy as Viral (season 12–14)
- Nadya Fricella as Hera (season 12, 14)
- Irfan Siagian as Maing (season 12–14)
- Rochman as Sukarni Bombi Yusenberg (season 12–14)
- Totos Rasiti as Atep (season 12–14)
- Ujang Ronda as Ajung (season 12–14)
- Dimas Anggara as Fadhli (season 12)
- Dina Lorenza as Nurlaela (season 12)
- Sania Velova as Putri (season 12)
- Silvia Anggraini as Alya (season 12–13)

==== Season 13 ====
- Syakir Daulay as Ustad David (season 13–14)
- Betari Ayu as Zahro (season 13–14; supporting 15)
- Yasamin Jasem as Alexandria (season 13–14)
- Bella Nurmala as Sifa (season 13)
- Adinda Dei as Ocie (season 13)
- Andi Annisa as Anna (season 13)
- Arman Hidayat as Sobirin (season 13)
- Agung Putra Prawira Nugraha as Apip (season 13)
- Kukuh Prasetya as Bahrudin (season 13)
- Silvia Anggraini as Alya (season 13)
- Ozzol Ramdan as Ujang the vegetable vendor (season 13, 15)

==== Season 14 ====
- Angel Lisandi Putri as Putri Sandi Angel (season 14)
- Linda Ramadhanty as Asma (season 14)
- Edwin Superbejo as Kunang (season 14)
- Ery Makmur as Ipong (season 14)
- Alodya Desi as Mulan Safira (season 14)
- Vizza Dara as Maya Estira (season 14)
- Meriel Jessica as Pepi (season 14)
- Unang as Kardiman (season 14)
- Ingrid Widjanarko as Grandma (season 14)

==== Season 15 ====
- Lavicky Nicholas as Habib (season 15)
- Dea Lestari as Lara (season 15)
- Salma Paramitha as Bulan (season 15)
- Dinda Kirana as Matahari (season 15)
- Tio Pakusadewo as Galaxy (season 15–16)
- Bima Sena as Ali Verpool (season 15)
- Opie Kumis as Amor (season 15)
- Ridwan Ghani as Soni (season 15)
- Ira Wibowo as Karmila (season 15)
- Yurike Prastika as Mak Dharti (season 15)
- Arswendi Nasution as Nasib (season 15)
- Cok Simbara as Netral (season 15)
- Maudy Koesnaedi as Nurjannah (season 15)
- Tohir Jokasmo as Tohir (season 15)
- Miranty Dewi as Miranty (season 15)

==== Season 16 ====
- Tora Sudiro as Zulfikar Badaruddin (season 16)
- El Manik as Haji Soleh (season 16)
- Renaga Tahier as King (season 16)
- Edbert Destiny as Dobleh (season 16)
- Faiz Vishal as Gembel (season 16)
- Cindy Nirmala as Cupi (season 16)
- Janis Aneira as Isyana Solehati (season 16)
- Temon Templar as Ronald (season 16)
- Shahnaz Haque as Ira (season 16)
- Keanu Azka as Tiadi (season 16)
- Tsana Zakiyah as Dwi Yanti (season 16)
- Donny Damara as Raja Nusantara (season 16)

==== Season 17 ====
- Sujiwo Tedjo as Amrik
- Fuad Idris as Pongki
- Teuku Rifnu Wikana as Debi
- Ence Bagus as Rasimin
- Cakrawala Satria Airawan as Akbar
- Zoul Pandjoul as Culay
- Fairel Banyu as Budiman / Delon
- Abiyyu Barakbah as Lopa
- Andi Viola as Shafira
- Allya Syakila as Leli
- Gemi Nastiti as Hamasa
- Ruth Marini as Maimun
- Ryma Gembala as Ayang
- Bagus Yusuf Saputra as Aman
- Almanzo Konoralma as Rahmat
- Miranty Dewi as Rohana
- Hengky Tornando as Hamzah
- Denaya Bintang Azmi as Desi

==== Season 18 ====
- Sandri Karamoy as Agam
- Sandy Pradana as Awan
- Esa Sigit as Bumi
- Naimma Aljuri as Mentari
- Zella Alhamid as Pertiwi
- Edbert Destiny Sebagai Alex Ferguson / Dobleh
- Faiz Vishal as Eka Putra / Gembel
- Benk Benk as Nyoto
- Rizky Inggar as Surti

==== Season 19 ====
- Raihan Khan as Muluk
- Farisha Fasha as Laila Fitriani
- Ridwan Ghani as Jarot
- Allya Syakila as Mila
- Angga Putra as Samsul
- Cheikna Yaffa as Cumi
- Sakurta Ginting as Tongkol
- Boy Siagian as Belut
- Rochman SBY as Rahmat
- Julian Kunto as Jereng
- Samuel Imanuel as Galak
- Ricky Malau as Hajar
- Abiyyu Barakbah as Komet
- Asyam Akila Pratisara Nugroho as Bedil
- Patricia Rena as Paris
- Octavianus Fransiskus Naibaho as Sobrat
- Janet Basalamah as Keket
- Destiny David as Ribut
- Aqilla Zahra Humairah as Cimol
- Aryasatya Ganendra as Kalong

=== Recurring ===
- Hafifi TB as Hafifi (season 1–11)
- Dara Rulyant as Dara (season 1–10)
- Anggia Jelita as Marni (season 1–10)
- Deliana Siahaan as Juki's mother (season 1–9)
- Benk Benk as motorcycle taxis driver (season 1)
- Aty Cancer Zein as Febri's grandmother (season 1)
- Linda Leona as Linda (season 5–10)
- Junaedi as Junaedi (season 1–13)
- Juk Ng as Juk Ng (season 1–13)
- Agus Wibowo as Agus (season 1–13)
- Andre Taulany as Deo (season 15)
- Sakurta Ginting as Joni Sakura (season 15)
- Kadir Srimulat as Kadir Mubarak (season 15)
- Revaldo as Dika (season 15)
- Zairin Zain as Rohim (season 15)
- Dharty Manullang as Debi's mother (season 17)

== Productions ==
=== Development ===
Series writer Wahyu H.S. said that in 2007, SCTV wanted to air a soap opera during sahur time instead of the more common variety show. Wahyu and Citra Sinema creative team pitched a story about three ex-convicts who learn Islam from a marbot after being released from prison yet rejected from their old lives. The original pitched title was Belajar Insyaf (Learning to Repent), but after SCTV asked for a title change, it was changed to the final title Para Pencari Tuhan, which was suggested by the producer, Deddy Mizwar.

Prior to the thirteenth season, Deddy Mizwar said that many actors, such as Idrus Madani and Agus Kuncoro, stopped appearing because they moved to another production houses. Deddy also believed that it would be hard to insert old characters into a new story when their arc have ended. A similar sentiment was expressed by Deddy before the fifteenth season; he said that the story arc for old characters would revolve around the same theme all over again.

=== Casting ===
In thirteenth to fourteenth season, Syakir Daulay were cast to play Ustad David. Betari Ayu to portray Zahro. Yasamin Jasem was selected to portray Alexandria.

In fifteenth season, Lavicky Nicholas was roped in to play Habib. Dinda Kirana was chosen to play Matahari. Dea Lestari and Tio Pakusadewo was cast to play Lara and Galaxy. Maudy Koesnaedi was cast as Nurjannah. Andre Taulany joined the cast as Deo.

== Reception ==
=== Viewership ===
According to AGB Nielsen data, the first season of Para Pencari Tuhan gained 32% share in average dan was watched by nearly all age demographics.

SCTV's public relations said that Para Pencari Tuhan third season gained 20.7% share per episode.

During the promotion for the seventeenth season, SCTV's Deputy Director of Programming, Banardi Rachmad, said that the fifteenth season gained 21% share and the sixteenth gained 26%.

=== Awards and nominations ===
Award	Date of ceremony	Category	Result	Ref.
Anugerah Komisi Penyiaran Indonesia	11 December 2012	Best Ramadan TV Series	Won	
Anugerah Komisi Penyiaran Indonesia	18 November 2014	Best Soap Opera	Won	
Anugerah Komisi Penyiaran Indonesia	28 October 2017	Best Drama Series	Nominated	
Anugerah Komisi Penyiaran Indonesia	17 December 2021	Best Drama Series	Won	
Anugerah Komisi Penyiaran Indonesia	26 November 2023	Television Drama Series	Won	
Anugerah Syiar Ramadan	15 July 2019	Soap Opera Programme	Won	
Anugerah Syiar Ramadan	22 October 2021	Soap Opera Programme	Won	
Anugerah Syiar Ramadan	3 July 2022	Special Award	Won	
Anugerah Syiar Ramadan	26 May 2023	Soap Opera Category	Nominated	
Bandung Film Festival	30 April 2008	Best TV Series	Won	
Bandung Film Festival	30 April 2008	Best TV Series Director	Won	
International Drama Content Festival Japan	22–24 October 2008	Special Award for Foreign Drama	Won	
