= Zaskia Adya Mecca =

Indonesian actress

- Born: Jakarta, Indonesia
- Education: Paramadina University
- Occupations: Actress; presenter
- Years active: 2001–present
- Spouse: Hanung Bramantyo (m. 2009)
- Parent(s): Eka Dewanta Insan Kamil; Rafida Kamil
- Relatives: Tasya Nur Medina (sister); Tania Ray Mina (sister); Haykal Kamil (brother); Marsha Natika (sister); Rifqa Malsyita (sister); Alwin Kamil (brother)

Zaskia Adya Mecca is an Indonesian actress and presenter of Sunda-Aceh-German descent. She is married to movie director Hanung Bramantyo and the oldest sister of actors Haykal Kamil and Marsha Natika, and a younger sister-in-law of actor Ferry Ardiansyah.

== Career ==
Zaskia started her career as a model, winning second place in Model Kawanku in 2001. She was subsequently offered supporting roles in the soap operas Senandung Masa Puber and Cinta SMU.

Zaskia starred in the soap opera Kiamat Sudah Dekat, directed by Deddy Mizwar. She has also appeared in Cinta SMU, Senandung Masa Puber, Lorong Waktu, Munajah Cinta, Aqso dan Madina, Dibalik Jilbab Zaskia, and Para Pencari Tuhan, Seasons 1–6.

At the end of December 2006, Zaskia starred in the television film on TVRI entitled Ibunda, directed by Rudi Imam. In 2007, Zaskia appeared in the religious films Kun Fayakuun and Ayat-Ayat Cinta, based on the novel of the same name by Habiburrahman El Shirazy. She has also appeared in Doa Yang Mengancam and Sang Pencerah..

== Personal life ==
On 14 September 2009, Zaskia married Hanung Bramantyo. They have five children.

== Filmography ==
=== Film ===
| Year | Title | Role | Notes |
|---|---|---|---|
| 2007 | Ayat-Ayat Cinta | Noura Bahadur | Supporting role |
| 2008 | Kun Fayakuun | Wife | Cameo |
| 2008 | Doa Yang Mengancam | Nurse Irene | Supporting role |
| 2010 | Menembus Impian | Eva | Supporting role |
| 2010 | Sang Pencerah | Siti Walidah | Lead role |
| 2014 | Panik | | |
| 2015 | Hijab | Sari | Lead role |
| 2015 | Youtubers | | Supporting role |
| 2015 | Cinta Paling Agung | Dewi | Supporting Role |
| 2015 | Surga Yang Tak Dirindukan | Sita | Supporting role |

=== Television ===
| Year | Title | Role | Notes | Network |
|---|---|---|---|---|
| 2002 | Bidadari 2 | | Supporting role | RCTI |
| 2002 | Cinta SMU | Farida | Supporting role | Indosiar |
| 2003–2004 | Senandung Masa Puber | | Supporting role | Trans TV |
| 2005–2007 | Kiamat Sudah Dekat | Sarah | Lead role | SCTV |
| 2005–2006 | Habibi dan Habibah | | | RCTI |
| 2006 | Kubersimpuh Pada-Mu | | Episode: "Jangan Ambil Nyawaku" | Astro Aruna |
| 2006 | Lorong Waktu 6 | Sabrina | Supporting role | SCTV |
| 2007 | Para Pencari Tuhan | Aya | Supporting role | SCTV |
| 2008 | Para Pencari Tuhan 2 | Aya | Supporting role | SCTV |
| 2008 | Munajah Cinta | Maemunnah/Mae | Lead role | RCTI |
| 2008 | Aqso dan Madina | Irene | Supporting role | RCTI |
| 2009 | Para Pencari Tuhan 3 | Aya | Supporting role | SCTV |
| 2009 | Dibalik Jilbab Zaskia | Zaskia | Lead role | Indosiar |
| 2010 | Para Pencari Tuhan 4 | Aya | Supporting role | SCTV |
| 2011 | Para Pencari Tuhan 5 | Aya | Supporting role | SCTV |
| 2012 | Para Pencari Tuhan 6 | Aya | Supporting role | SCTV |

== Awards and nominations ==
| Year | Awards | Category | Recipients | Results |
|---|---|---|---|---|
| 2011 | SCTV Awards | Famous Supporting Actress | Para Pencari Tuhan 5 | Won |
| 2014 | Yahoo! Celebrity Awards | Most Fashionable Hijaber | Zaskia Adya Mecca | Nominated |
| 2014 | Zalora | Iconic Muslim Celebrities | Zaskia Adya Mecca | Won |
| 2015 | Infotainment Awards | Most Fashionable Hijaber Celebrity | Zaskia Adya Mecca | Won |
| 2015 | Mom & Kids Awards | Favorite Social Media Baby | Sybilla (Zaskia Adya Mecca) | Nominated |
| 2015 | Mom & Kids Awards | Favorite Mom & Kids | Zaskia Adya Mecca & Sybilla | Nominated |
| 2016 | Infotainment Awards | Most Fashionable Hijaber Celebrity | Zaskia Adya Mecca | Won |
| 2016 | Socmed Awards | Celeb Gram Hijabers | Zaskia Adya Mecca | Nominated |
| 2016 | Mom & Kids Awards | Favorite Mommy | Zaskia Adya Mecca | Nominated |
| 2017 | Infotainment Awards | Most Fashionable Hijaber Celebrity | Zaskia Adya Mecca | Nominated |
