= Kauman =

Javanese area where pious Muslim communities are concentrated

Kauman is a village name used by regencies and municipalities in Central and East Java to name an area where pious Muslim communities are concentrated.

A Kauman village is usually located on the west side of a town square with the Kauman Great Mosque adjacent to the square.
