= Opie Kumis =

Indonesian actor and comedian

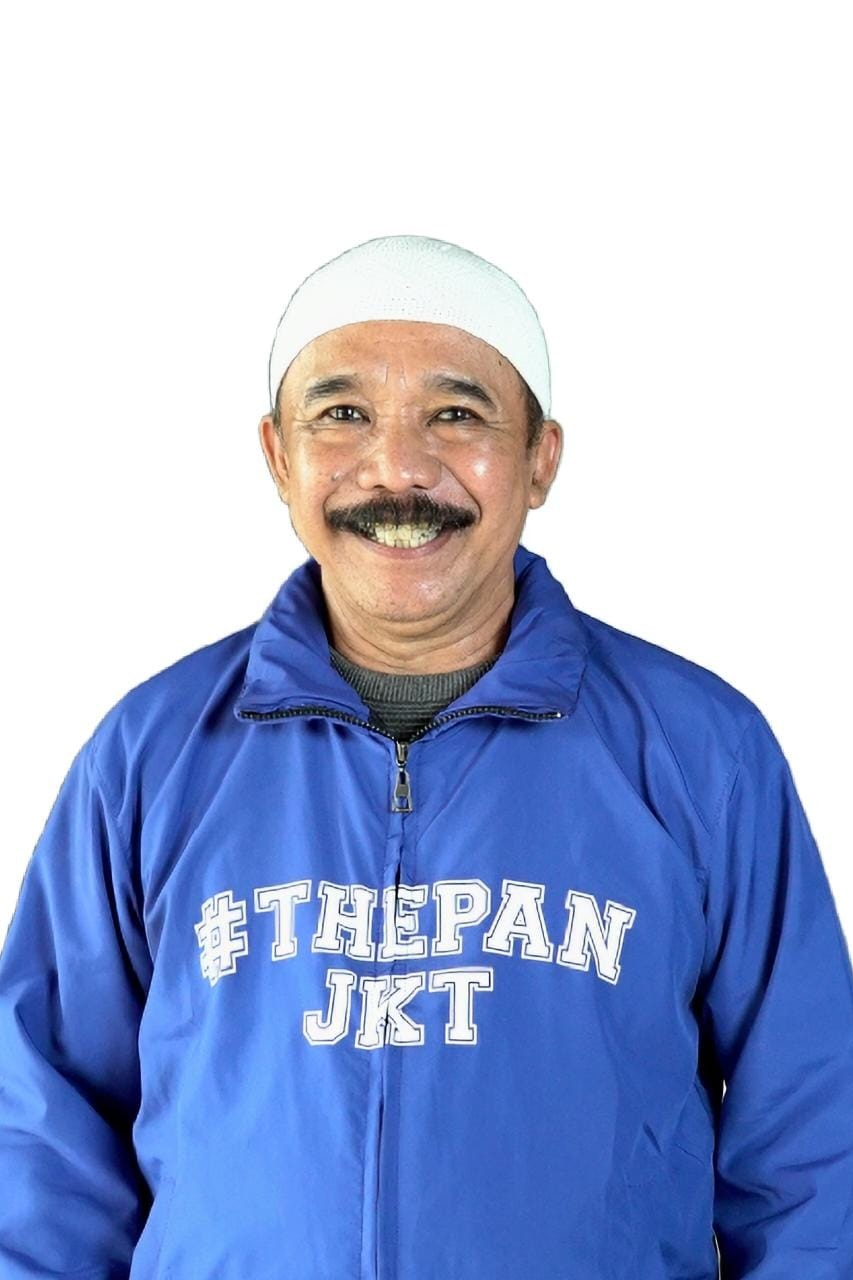
- Born: Muchtar Luthfi; March 17, 1960 (age 66); Jakarta, Indonesia
- Occupations: Actor; Comedian
- Years active: 1989–present

Muchtar Lutfi (born March 17, 1960), commonly known as Opie Kumis, is an Indonesian actor and comedian.

== Career ==
Opie began to be known when starring in Lorong Waktu (1999). After that he often participate in a variety of television soap operas, especially the comedy genre. Besides, he also frequently appeared as a guest star in many comedy shows such as: Opera Van Java, as well as other talk show. He also participated several times in the boy band parody group along with several other comedian actors such as Parto, Nunung, Sule, Andre Taulany, etc.

== Filmography ==
=== Film ===
- Ketika (2004)
- Nagabonar Jadi 2 (2009)
- Jagad X Code (2009)
- Mama Minta Pulsa (2012)
- Jeritan Danau Terlarang (2013)
- Malam Suro di Rumah Darmo (2014)
- Baper (2016)

=== Comedy ===
- Pesbukers
