= Pipiet Senja =

Indonesian author (1957–2025)

- Born: Etty Hadiwati Arief; 16 May 1957; Sumedang, West Java, Indonesia
- Died: 25 September 2025 (aged 68); Depok, West Java, Indonesia
- Occupations: Poet, novelist
- Writing career
- Language: Indonesian, Sundanese
- Years active: 1975–2025

Etty Hadiwati Arief (16 May 1957 – 29 September 2025), better known by her pen name Pipiet Senja, was an Indonesian author. Diagnosed with thalassemia in her childhood, Pipiet began writing in the 1970s. Through 2023, she published more than two hundred books, including multiple works with Islamic themes as well as several edited volumes of works by Indonesian migrant workers in Hong Kong.

== Early life and career ==
Pipiet was born in Sumedang, West Java, on 16 May 1957. She was one of six children born to Major Chb SM Arief, a former revolutionary, and Siti Hadijah. She was diagnosed with thalassemia in her childhood, and thus throughout her life she required regular blood transfusions. Doctors gave her a short life expectancy, and due to the continued treatment Pipiet only completed two years of senior high school.

In her youth, Pipiet was an avid reader, consuming works by Indonesian authors such as the silat stories of Kho Ping Hoo and the poems of Ajip Rosidi and Rendra, as well as translated works by Karl May and Charles Dickens. She began keeping a diary in her youth. In 1975, she began writing with the intent of being published. Her first works were poems submitted to radio stations based in Bandung, West Java. She later expanded her oeuvre to include short stories, novels, and books for children. In 1976, she published her first stories in the magazine Aktuil; short stories for children were also included in the magazine Bobo.

Pipiet wrote in both Indonesian and Sundanese. As her pen name, she took the name Pipiet Senja. The word pipiet refers to the Estrildidae family of birds, which she perceived as having the same fragility as her body. The word senja, meanwhile, is Indonesian for "twilight", which signified an ending. At the time, despite the relatively large honoraria received through publication, her family experienced financial difficulties due to the cost of treating Pipiet's thalassemia.

== Forum Lingkar Pena ==
Pipiet later became associated with the Forum Lingkar Pena, a writers collective established by Helvy Tiana Rosa and Asma Nadia in 1997. In 2000, she attended a speech delivered by Rosa regarding the goals of Islamic fiction. Questioning whether she could write works that embodied an Islamic spirit, enlightened the Muslim community, and avoided taboo topics, Pipiet reached out to Rosa for guidance. She recalled receiving "genuine, warm welcome, appreciation and attention", and being pointed to meetings hosted by the Prosperous Justice Party to learn Islamic values as taught by the tarbiyah movement.

As a member of FLP, Pipiet worked closely with the organization's Hong Kong branch, editing volumes of members' work and facilitating publication through Zikrul Hakim Publishers. One of these books was Surat Berdarah Untuk Presiden (Bloody Letters for the President, 2011), a collection of 26 stories on migrant workers' life experiences as well as sixteen letters directed at the President of Indonesia. She wrote extensively on the experiences of Indonesian migrant workers in Hong Kong on the social media platform Kompasiana, producing dozens of articles on the subject, with topics ranging from mistreatment and suffering to success stories. FLP also provided her with support, with royalties from the anthology Ketika Duka Tersenyum (When Grief Smiles, 2001) used to cover Pipiet's surgical expenses. Regarding her teaching and writing on Islamic themes, she wrote that she sought to "spread the virus of writing" as part of a dakwah by the pen (daʾwa bi al-qalam).

== Later life ==
Pipiet published a memoir, Bagaimana Aku Bertahan (How I Persevere), focusing on her struggles with thalassemia. This book was a best seller in the Indonesian market. Other well received works published in the 2000s include Namaku May Sarah (My Name Is May Sarah, 2001), Menggapai Kasih-Mu (Reaching for Your Love, 2002), Lukisan Rembulan (Painting of the Moon, 2003), Tembang Lara (Song of Sorrow, 2003), Meretas Ungu (Breaking Violet, 2005), and Langit Jingga Hatiku (The Orange Sky of My Heart, 2007). Pipiet established the Pipiet Senja Publishing house.

Pipiet's novel Kalam-Kalam Langit was adapted into a 2016 film directed by Tarmizi Abka and produced by Dhoni Ramdhan. By this point, Pipiet was travelling regularly as a motivational speaker, as well as visiting pesantren (Islamic boarding schools) to promote writing among Muslim students as part of Gerakan Santri Menulis (Santri Can Write Movement). By 2023, she had published 204 books, including collaborations with other authors as well as edited anthologies.

== Personal life ==
Pipiet was married to H. E. Yassin. The couple had two children, Haekal Siregar and Azimattinur Siregar, before their divorce.

In September 2025, Pipiet visited her child in Depok, West Java. She fell ill on 25 September and died four days later. It was announced that she would be buried in Block F of Cikutra Public Cemetery, Bandung.

== Works cited ==
- Arnez, Monika; Nisa, Eva F. (2016). "Dimensions of Morality: The Transnational Writers' Collective Forum Lingkar Pena". Bijdragen tot de Taal-, Land- en Volkenkunde / Journal of the Humanities and Social Sciences of Southeast Asia. 172 (4): 449–478. doi:10.1163/22134379-17204003.
- El Hamidy, Abdul Hakim (2014). Laa Tabkii: Jangan Menangis [Laa Tabkii: Cry Not] (in Indonesian). Depok, West Java: Puspa Swara. ISBN 978-979-1479-82-0.
- Esye, Kustawa (2 July 2023). "Pipiet Senja: 67 Tahun Didera Thalassemia, Sukses Menulis 204 Buku" [Pipiet Senja: 67 Suffering from Thalassemia, Has Written 204 Books]. Karanganyar News (in Indonesian). Archived from the original on 7 March 2026.
- Mubarok, Machmud (29 September 2025). "Innalillahi, Pipiet Senja, Sastrawati Putri Pejuang Cimahi, Meninggal Sempat Posting Tanda Kematian" [To God She Belongs, Pipiet Senja, Author, Daughter of Freedom Fighter from Cimahi, Dies; Posted Information about Death]. Tribun Priangan (in Indonesian). Archived from the original on 7 March 2026.
- Muftisany, Hafidz (10 October 2016). "Karya Baru Pipiet Senja di Republika" [Pipiet Senja's New Work at Republika]. Republika (in Indonesian). Archived from the original on 7 March 2026.
- Nasrullah, Rulli (February 2014). "'Selling' Self-Image in the Era of New Media". Humaniora. 26 (1): 3–12. doi:10.22146/jh.4642 (inactive 7 March 2026).
- Putra, Yudha Manggala (3 April 2016). "Film Kalam-Kalam Langit Suguhkan Pesan Belajar Alquran" [The Film Kalam-Kalam Langit Presents a Message to Study the Qur'an]. Republika (in Indonesian). Archived from the original on 7 March 2026.
- Putri, Utami Isharyani (30 September 2025). "Innalillahi, Pipiet Senja, Sastrawati Jawa Barat Pejuang Thallasemia Wafat, Sempat Unggah Tanda Kematian" [To God She Belongs, Pipiet Senja, West Javan Author and Thallasemia Activist, Dies; Uploaded Information about Death]. Kabar Tasikmalaya (in Indonesian). Archived from the original on 7 March 2026.
