= Assalamualaikum Beijing =

- Theatrical release poster
- Directed by: Guntur Soeharjanto
- Screenplay by: Alim Sudio
- Story by: Asma Nadia
- Based on: Assalamualaikum, Beijing! by Asma Nadia
- Starring: Revalina S. Temat; Morgan Oey; Ibnu Jamil
- Cinematography: Enggar Budiono
- Music by: Joseph S. Djafar
- Production company: Maxima Films
- Release date: 30 December 2014 (Indonesia)
- Running time: 94 minutes
- Country: Indonesia

Assalamualaikum Beijing is a 2014 Indonesian Islamic romance film directed by Guntur Soeharjanto. Starring Revalina S. Temat, Morgan Oey, and Ibnu Jamil, it follows a young woman who travels to Beijing after leaving her unfaithful fiancé. While writing a travelogue about life in China, including the practice of Islam there, she falls in love with a Chinese man. He converts to Islam so that they can marry, and after she is diagnosed with antiphospholipid syndrome, he remains by her side.

Based on a novel by Asma Nadia, Assalamualaikum Beijing was filmed on location in Indonesia and China. It was released to commercial success, selling more than 500,000 tickets, and received comic and television adaptations. A sequel, set in Ningxia and featuring different characters, was released in 2025.

== Plot ==
Asma (Revalina S. Temat) learns that her fiancé Dewa (Ibnu Jamil) has impregnated another woman, Anita (Cynthia Ramlan). She cancels her wedding, telling him to support his child. Three months later, Asma travels to Beijing on assignment as a reporter. She adapts to life in China with the help of her friend Sekar (Laudya Cynthia Bella) and begins a column about life as an Indonesian migrant. For this, she travels to various tourism sites, including the Beijing National Stadium and the Great Wall of China. She also interviews several Beijing residents.

One day, Asma meets a young Chinese man named Zhongwen (Morgan Oey) on the bus. She spots him several times afterwards, but they only speak further when he serves as her tour guide at Niujie Mosque. Asma learns that, despite Zhongwen's apparent knowledge of Islam, he is not a Muslim. However, the two bond over their religious discussions. Dewa, having read Asma's column, departs for China, where he announces his intention to divorce Anita and marry Asma. He accompanies Asma and Zhongwen on a trip to the Temple of Heaven, where he mistreats Zhongwen both out of jealousy and because the latter is non-Muslim. Angered, Asma abandons Dewa.

As time passes, Asma begins to suffer severe headaches and ultimately collapses at the office. She is diagnosed with antiphospholipid syndrome, an anti-immune disease, for which she decides to undergo treatment in Indonesia. Leaving without informing Zhongwen, once in Indonesia, she recalls their discussion of the story of Ashma. As she contemplates the story, she realizes that she loves Zhongwen. After her condition is treated, Asma returns home to live with her mother, who is further supported by Sekar. Dewa, however, continues to pursue her.

Meanwhile, Zhongwen has studied Islam intensely and converted. He travels to Indonesia, where he seeks out Asma. When she is stricken blind and collapses, he promises to take care of her; Dewa, meanwhile, acknowledges that Asma no longer desires to marry him and returns to Anita. As Asma recovers, Zhongwen asks her mother for permission to marry. This proposal is accepted, and the two commit despite concerns that any pregnancy could result in a miscarriage. Once Asma's illness is brought under control, she returns to China with Zhongwen. She publishes a novel based on her experiences and learns that she has become pregnant. She and Zhongwen agree that their child will grow as strong and enduring as their love.

== Production ==
The film Assalamualaikum Beijing is based on the 2013 novel of the same name by Asmarani Rosalba, better known as Asma Nadia. Nadia, a founding member of the Forum Lingkar Pena, considers her novels a means of dakwah (Islamic proselytization). Regarding the adaptation of her novels to film, in a 2016 interview, she explained, "it means it has become a much bigger medium for dakwah. You know, one book can only have around 50 thousand readers. But when it is filmed, let alone a box office film, our dakwah could reach 4.6 million people!"

Assalamualaikum Beijing was produced during a surge in Islamic themed-films with non-Indonesian settings, which also included Ayat-Ayat Cinta (Verses of Love, 2008) and Ketika Cinta Bertasbih (When Love Prays, 2009). It was one of several films adapted from novels by Asma Nadia, which had previously included Emak Ingin Naik Haji (Mother Wants to Go On the Hajj, 2010) and Rumah Tanpa Jendela (A House Without Windows, 2011).

Assalamualaikum Beijing was directed by Guntur Soeharjanto for Maxima Pictures, with Ody Mulya Hidayat producing. Guntur had previously had success with the religious film 99 Cahaya di Langit Eropa. The screenplay was produced by Alim Sudio based on a story by Asma Nadia. Cinematography was handled by Enggar Budiono, with music by Joseph S. Djafar and editing by Ryan Purwoko. Asma Nadia, the author of the source novel, was heavily involved in the adaptation process, receiving full access to the screenplay and being included in production meetings.

The film starred Laudya Cynthia Bella as Asma, Morgan Oey as Zhongwen, and Ibnu Jamil as Dewa. Supporting roles were taken by Cynthia Ramlan, Jajang C. Noer, Ollyne Apple, and Laudya Cynthia Bella. This was the first film for Oey, who had previously gained prominence as a member of the band SM*SH. The Singkawang-born Oey had to study Mandarin for the role, as well as memorize information about the sites that his character Zhongwen would be showcasing as a tour guide.

Shooting was done mostly on location, both in Indonesia and in China. Scenes shot in China included the Temple of Heaven, Tiananmen Square, and the Wangfujing shopping district. Several scenes were filmed at the Great Wall of China, requiring a stretch to be closed for approximately 90 minutes. Speaking with Antara, producer Ody Mulya Hidayat described the filming process as having been hindered by pervasive air pollution as well as difficulty finding foods suited to Indonesian tastes. Ultimately, the crew retained the chef used by the Indonesian Embassy in Beijing.

== Release and reception ==
Assalamualaikum Beijing was released on 30 December 2014. Maxima reported 300,000 ticket sales by 6 January 2015, with total ticket sales reaching 560,465. Oey won Best Newcomer at the 2015 Maya Awards.

The scholar of Indonesian cinema Thomas Barker describes Assalamualaikum Beijing as emphasizing Asma's role as an ambassador of faith. He writes that the character's sweet personality and faith are presented as sufficient to convince an agnostic man to convert to Islam as well as to enter a romance that can persevere even in the face of cultural differences and physical illnesses. He also notes the film's emphasis on China's Islamic history, which he describes as highlighting how global travel can reaffirm – rather than weaken – Indonesian Muslims' faith.

In 2015, Asma Nadia released a comic version of Assalamualaikum Beijing, based on the film. A television series based on the film was released in 2018, with Citra Kirana portraying Asma and Anthony Xie as Zhongwen. A sequel, Assalamualaikum Beijing 2: Lost in Ningxia, was released in 2025. It follows a young Muslim convert, Aisha (Yasmin Napper), who travels to Ningxia, China, where she is separated from her beloved, Arif (Emir Mahira).

== Works cited ==
- Adji, Alberta Natasia (2019). "Assalamualaikum Beijing Repackaged: Habitus, Symbolic Power and Indonesian Cultural Production". Makara Human Behavior Studies in Asia. 23 (2): 161–171. doi:10.7454/hubs.asia.1260619.
- Al-Farisi, Baharudin; Kistyarini (30 May 2020). "Sinopsis Film Assalamualaikum Beijing, Menemukan Cinta Lagi di Negeri Orang" [Synopsis of the Film Assalamualaikum Beijing, Finding New Love in a Foreign Land]. Kompas (in Indonesian). Archived from the original on 26 February 2026.
- "'Assalamualaikum Beijing' Jadi Film Perdana Morgan Oey" ['Assalamualaikum Beijing' Is Morgan Oey's First Film]. detik.com. 5 November 2014. Archived from the original on 26 February 2026.
- Barker, Thomas (2019). Indonesian Cinema after the New Order: Going Mainstream. Hong Kong University Press. ISBN 978-988-8528-07-3.
- "Demi 'Assalamualaikum Beijing', Morgan Oey Belajar Bahasa Mandarin" [For 'Assalamualaikum Beijing', Morgan Oey Learned Mandarin]. detik.com. 27 December 2014. Archived from the original on 26 February 2026.
- "Film 'Assalamualaikum Beijing' Tak Sekadar Tawarkan Kisah Cinta" [The Film 'Assalamualaikum Beijing' Does Not Merely Offer a Love Story]. detik.com. 21 November 2014. Archived from the original on 26 February 2026.
- Fox, Richard (2020). "Screening Piety, Class, and Romance in Indonesia". Bijdragen tot de Taal-, Land- en Volkenkunde. 176 (1): 70–104. doi:10.1163/22134379-bja10003. JSTOR 26910984.
- "Daftar Lengkap Pemeran dan Kru Assalamualaikum Beijing" [Complete List of Cast and Crew Assalamualaikum Beijing]. filmindonesia.or.id (in Indonesian). Konfiden Foundation. Archived from the original on 26 February 2026.
- Kurniawan, Indra (26 March 2018). "Ini Sosok Pria Lawan Main Citra Kirana di Assalamualaikum Beijing The Series" [This is the Man Playing Opposite Citra Kirana in Assalamualaikum Beijing The Series]. Tabloid Bintang (in Indonesian). Archived from the original on 26 February 2026.
- Prasetiyo, Bagus (20 December 2015). "Ini Daftar Pemenang Piala Maya 2015" [Here Are the Winners for the 2015 Maya Award]. Tempo (in Indonesian). Archived from the original on 26 February 2026.
- Ramadhan, Bilal (14 December 2014). "Asma Nadia Dilibatkan dalalm Film 'Assalamualaikum Beijing'" [Asma Nadia Involved in the Film 'Assalamualaikum Beijing']. Republika. Archived from the original on 26 February 2026.
- Riandi, Ady Prawira; Sembiring, Ira Gita Natalia (21 May 2025). "Sinopsis dan Daftar Pemeran Film Assalamualaikum Beijing 2: Lost in Ningxia" [Synopsis and Cast of Film Assalamualaikum Beijing 2: Lost in Ningxia]. Kompas (in Indonesian). Archived from the original on 26 February 2026.
- "Seminggu Tayang, 'Assalamualikum Beijing' Raih 300 Ribu Penonton" [One Week Screening, 'Assalamualikum Beijing' Sells 300 Thousand Tickets]. detik.com. 6 January 2015. Archived from the original on 26 February 2026.
- Yuniar, Nanien (13 December 2014). "Tembok Tiongkok Tutup Demi "Assalamualaikum Beijing"" [Wall of China Closed for "Assalamualaikum Beijing"]. Antara (in Indonesian). Archived from the original on 26 February 2026.
