= Forum Lingkar Pena =

Indonesian writers' collective

- Abbreviation: FLP
- Founders: Helvy Tiana Rosa; Asma Nadia
- Founded at: Depok, Indonesia
- Type: Writers' collective
- Members: 2,348 (2018)
- Official language: Indonesian
- General Secretary: Sugiarti
- Parent organization: Lingkaran Pena Foundation

Forum Lingkar Pena (FLP, translated as Pen Circle Forum) is a transnational writers' collective based in Indonesia. Established by sisters Helvy Tiana Rosa and Asma Nadia in 1997, FLP grew rapidly through advertisements in the magazine Annida, with chapters in 23 Indonesian provinces and 8 foreign countries by 2008. FLP distinguished itself from contemporary Indonesian literary movements by focusing on predominantly Islamic themes, positioning itself not only as a forum for supporting new writers but also as a vehicle for dakwah (proselytization). Although several works have been popular, the collective has generally been ignored by the Indonesian literary canon.

FLP is organizationally divided into four levels, from the central administrative body through school- and university-level chapters. Members are predominantly young Muslim women enrolled in university, though a range of occupations are represented. They produce a variety of media, both fiction and non-fiction, which have included novels, short stories, and screenplays. Most works are published through smaller media that focus on Islam, though some works have been picked up by larger publishing houses.

== Description ==
Forum Lingkar Pena (FLP) is a transnational writers' collective. It is based in Indonesia, but has numerous chapters in foreign countries. Members' output consists primarily through fiction, including novels and short stories, and essays, though following the success of films such as Ayat-Ayat Cinta (Verses of Love, 2008) and Ketika Cinta Bertasbih (When Love Prays, 2009) screenplays became increasingly common. Likewise, with the advent of online media, non-fiction writings have become more popular. The funding model for the organization is oriented towards self-sufficiency, with most expenses covered by membership fees, though some branches have received financial support from organizations such as Dompet Dhuafa and Tabung Wakaf Indonesia.

Although most FLP members are young women enrolled in university, it also includes teachers, civil servants, domestic workers, and housewives. Many have experience with dakwah (proselytization) on university campuses, though generally members have had little limited involvement in the writing and publishing industries. Generally, more experienced members will offer training and support to less experienced ones, and as members gain experience and publish works they are treated as more senior. Although most members are Muslim, this is not an explicit requirement, and the organization includes a small minority of non-Muslim writers.

Organizationally, FLP consists of four layers of administration. The central organization is under a chairperson; for the 2025–2029 period, this is Sugiarti, a writer active under the pen name Nafi'ah al-Ma'rab. This central body includes units dedicated to research, networking, publication, and other projects. Under the central FLP are regional organizations (FLP Wilayah), which operate at the provincial level. Branches (FLP Cabang) operate under these regional organizations, and represent groups at the municipal level. The fourth administrative level (FLP Ranting) involves groups active at individual schools or universities.

== Mission and programmes ==
According to its mission statement, FLP has five objectives: providing a forum for writers and potential writers, improving the quality of members' work, creating an "objective and responsible media image", improving Indonesians' culture of reading and writing, and promoting the emergence of new writers. This has been undertaken by framing writing as a means for enlightening the ummah (Muslim community), providing what the organization terms adwah bil qalam—dakwah by the pen.

To realize these goals, FLP has implemented various programmes. Branches are expected to host workshops and facilitate publication. Awards are provided by the FLP, as are quiet spaces known as Rumah Cahaya for reading and writing. These may be hosted at dedicated sites or incorporated into a member's home, depending on the financial resources available. Several branches have developed programs targeted specifically at children.

Branches may also implement their own programmes, as informed by their particular circumstances. For instance, the branch in Yogyakarta—a city known as a center of education—operates recruitment programmes at the high school level. In Hong Kong, where members are predominantly migrant workers, members operate a mobile lending library in Victoria Park. The branch in Aceh, meanwhile, provided space for psychological counselling following the lengthy insurgency and the 2004 Indian Ocean earthquake and tsunami.

== History ==
=== Establishment ===
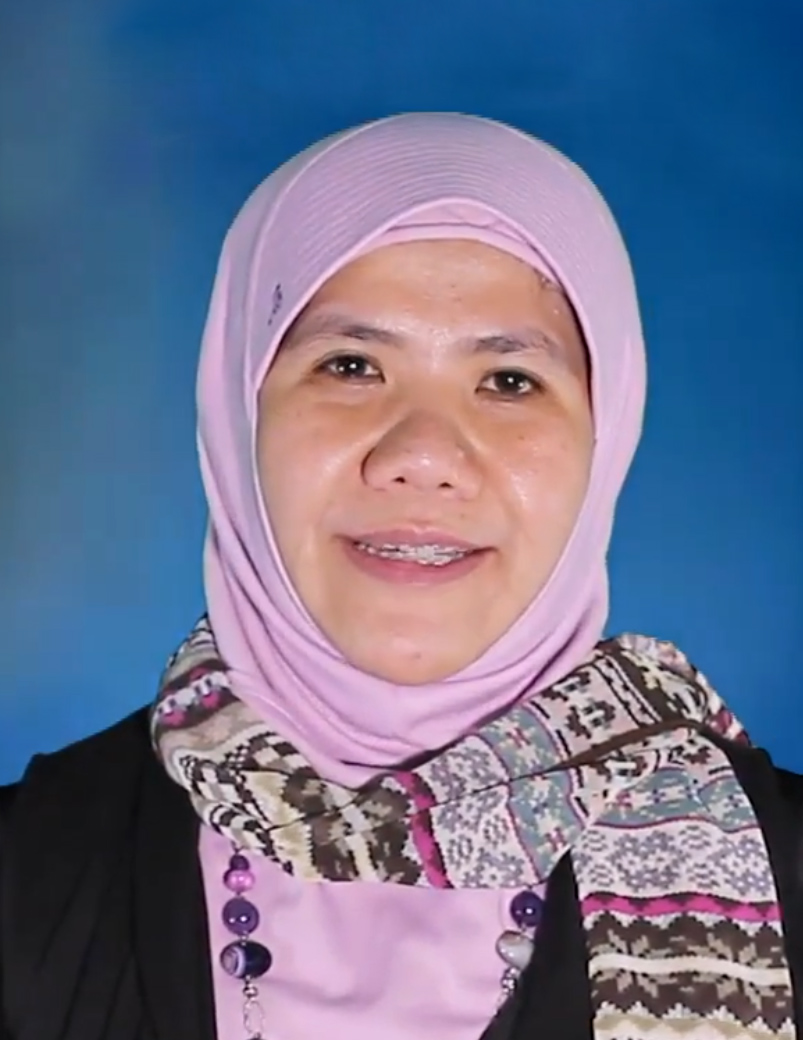
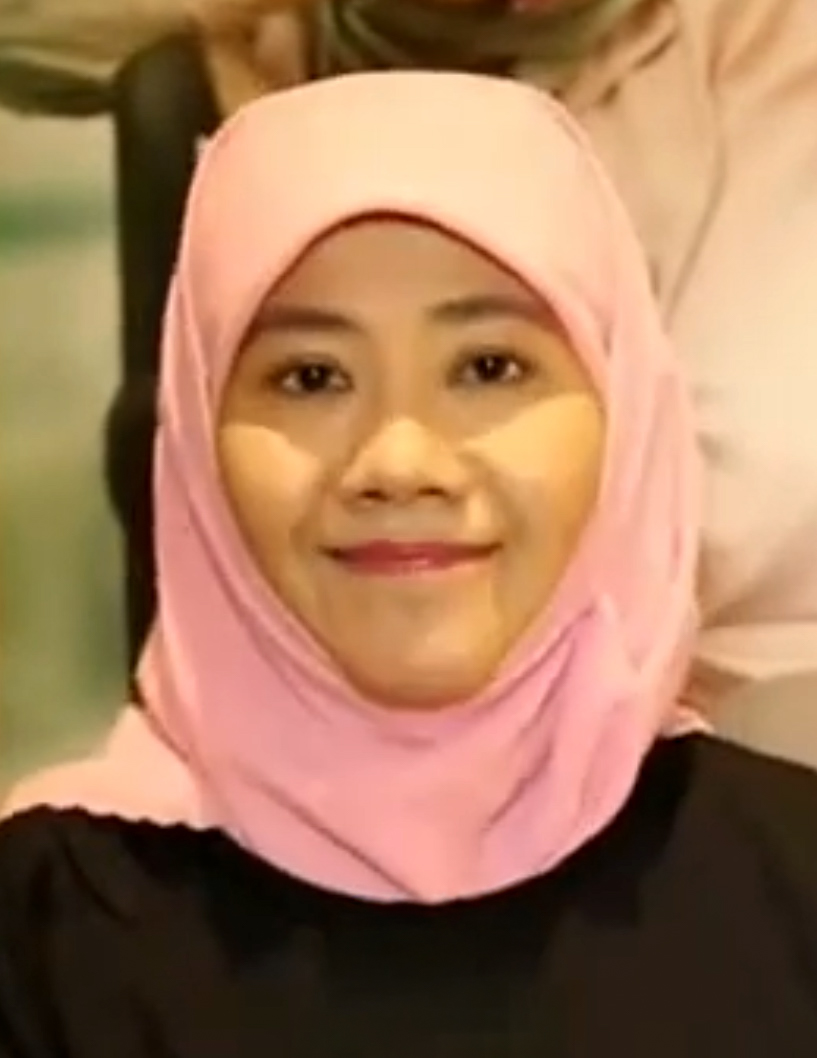
The founders of FLP, Helvy Tiana Rosa (left) and Asma Nadia (right).

FLP was established by Helvy Tiana Rosa and her younger sister Asma Nadia, based on a discussion held with students at the Ukhuwah Islamiyah mosque at the University of Indonesia in Depok, Indonesia, on 22 February 1997. Rosa was an established playwright, having founded the Teater Bening ("Clear Theatre") in 1990, and written numerous works of fiction dealing with Islamic themes. Nadia, meanwhile, had been writing since childhood but only published her first stories in the 1990s; her first books were not published until 2000. The movement emerged within a context of Islamic revivalism in Indonesia, wherein media and organizations focused on Islam promulgated amidst loosening restrictions under the New Order regime.

The establishment of FLP was concurrent with the rise of literary works identified as sastra wangi ("fragrant literature"), works produced by young urban woman authors such as Ayu Utami, Djenar Maesa Ayu, and Dewi Lestari. Rosa, writing in 2003, decried works by the authors as overly emphasizing women's sexuality and bodies. FLP, thus, was intended to promote an Islamic understanding of love over such sexualized approaches. FLP's approach to Islamic fiction was further intended to counter the degradation of aqidah (creed) and akhlak (morality) while simultaneously using literature as a means of dakwah (proselytization).

=== Growth ===
At its onset, FLP consisted of some 30 individuals. Within a year, however, the organization had expanded, with Muthi Masfufah coordinating the establishment of branches in Kalimantan, including in Bontang, Samarinda, and Balikpapan. More branches were opened in other parts of Indonesia throughout the end of the decade.

In June 2000, FLP established a partnership with the Ummi Group, a publisher of magazines such as Ummi and Annida. These magazines, which were targeted primarily at Muslim readers, carried numerous stories written by FLP members. This, in turn, allowed the organization to expand its reach and further increase membership. According to Rosa, by 2003 more than 2,000 people had joined FLP based on advertisements in the magazine Annida. Habiburrahman El Shirazy, who later gained fame for his novel Ayat-Ayat Cinta (Verses of Love, 2004), recalled applying to join FLP in this manner, submitting an application after viewing an advertisement and receiving a welcome email from Rosa and Nadia several weeks later.

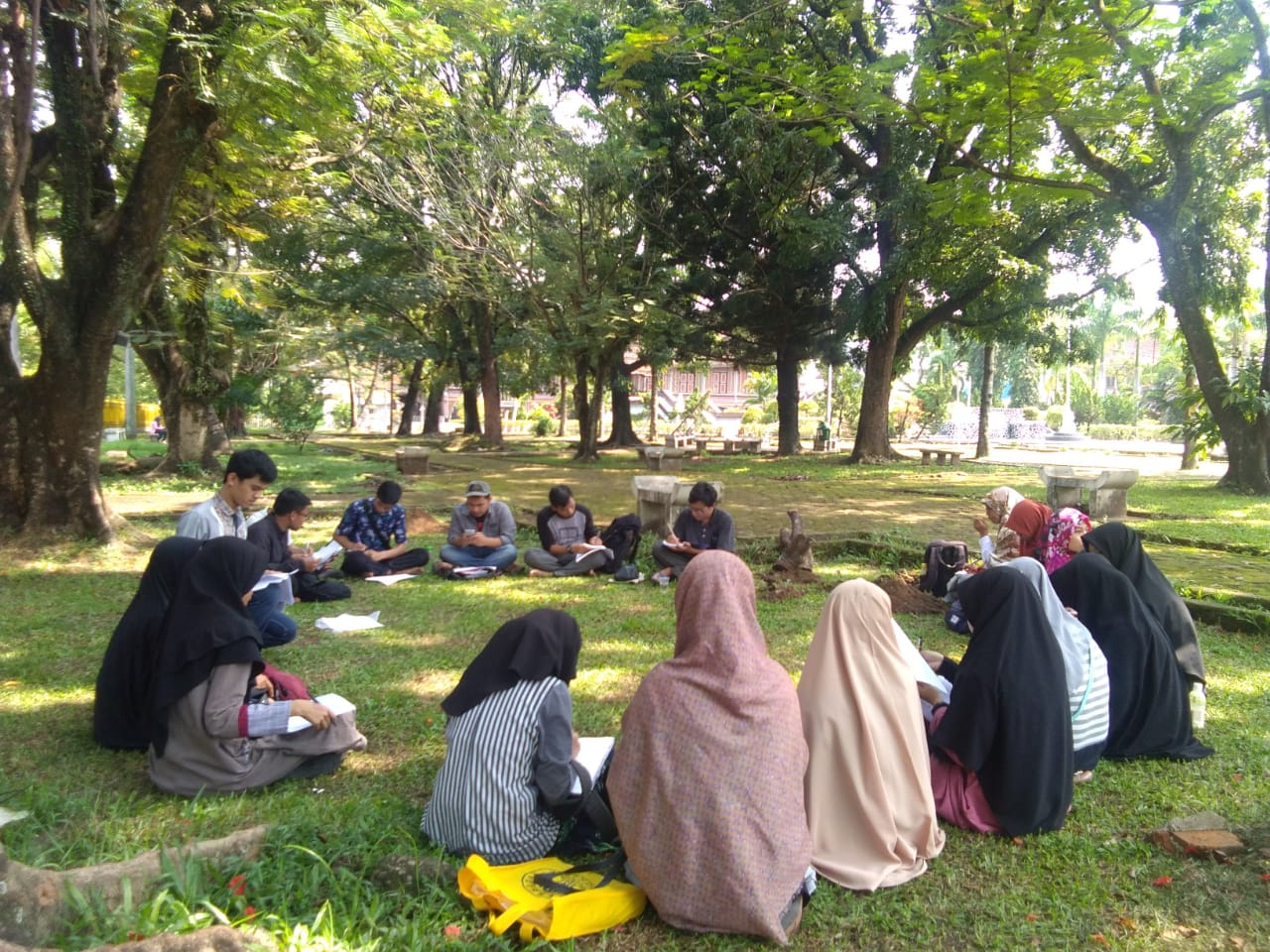
A Forum Lingkar Pena meeting in Padang, West Sumatra, 2019

The FLP has also developed connections with the Prosperous Justice Party (Partai Keadilan Sejahtera, PKS), an Islamic political party. Rosa has collaborated with the party on several occasions, including in opening libraries. She has also featured it in her fiction; for example, she produced a short story that framed party member PKS Member of Parliament Nasir Jamil as a real-life manifestation of the titular character in her short story "Ketika Mas Gagah Pergi" ("When Mas Gagah Died", 1997). The party's website, meanwhile, disseminates information on FLP activities. However, not all FLP members are members of the party.

By 2008, FLP consisted of 5,000 members, spread through 23 of Indonesia's provinces as well as eight foreign communities, including a Hong Kong branch, established in 2004 by twelve Indonesian domestic workers in the city. Approximately ten per cent of FLP had been published in local media, and FLP was working on collaborating with established publishers to expand its reach; it also operated the Lingkar Pena Publishing House, which had published the works of more than 300 members by 2009. In 2011, the organization reported 123 branches in 29 provinces, as well as 13 foreign organizations. FLP branches were located in Egypt, Australia, the Netherlands, Canada, Yemen, and Saudi Arabia.

After the magazine Annida closed, FLP focused on using blogs and workshops for recruitment. Membership had dwindled to 2,348 by 2018, at which time FLP reported 73 branches in 29 provinces. As online publication became more commonplace, members began to focus on writing works of non-fiction that were posted on the internet.

== Analysis ==
=== Messaging ===
Although some works published by FLP members deal with non-Islamic themes, the majority of the community's works center around Islam. Particular emphasis is given to the importance of reading, with members citing Verses 3–5 of Surah Al-Alaq, a chapter in the Qur'an, as a religious foundation for their literary work.

Literature is understood as a means of dakwah (proselytization). For the FLP, this does not mean preaching Islam to non-Muslims, but rather teaching Muslims to better practice their religion. As part of this dakwah, FLP members communicate specific values through their fiction. Works tend to emphasize the existence of God and the importance of doing what is expected of Muslims (wajib) while avoiding what is forbidden (haram). Works often emphasize a universal love, as manifested through maintaining the environment and good relations with others. Several have advocated a pro-Palestinian position, or donated proceeds to Palestine.

Members are held to similar expectations. They are urged to avoid dating and divert their gazes from non-muhrim (marriageable kin). Men are expected to maintain a beard, while women should wear a hijab. However, the extent to which these standards are upheld varies between members.

=== Position in Indonesian literature ===
Despite its size and influence, works by FLP have generally received little attention from the institutions that shape the Indonesian literary canon, such as the Jakarta Arts Council, the literary critics for the newspaper Kompas and the magazine Tempo, and the Utan Kayu Community. Such organizations, the film scholar and novelist Intan Paramaditha notes, tend to focus on more secular subjects. The FLP community has gained a reputation for focusing on output, resulting in it being deemed a "factory for story writers" (pabrik penulis cerita).

The organization has received criticism for a perceived lack of quality, which former chairman Irfan Hidayatullah attributes to its members' relative lack of experience. FLP Bandung member Topik Mulyana noted in 2018 that many of members' works have been published through smaller platforms with religious leanings, where competition is minimal. He suggested that it was necessary for members to strive towards publishing their works in national media such as Kompas, Tempo, Media Indonesia, and Republika. The organization has also invited established writers who are not FLP members, such as Taufiq Ismail and Ahmad Tohari, to provide further coaching to members.

== Notable members ==
- Asma Nadia
- Gola Gong
- Habiburrahman El Shirazy
- Helvy Tiana Rosa
- Pipiet Senja

== Representative works ==
- Rosa, Helvy Tiana (1997). Ketika Mas Gagah Pergi [When Mas Gagah Died] (in Indonesian). Jakarta: Penerbit Seri Kisah-Kisah Islami Annid. OCLC 68109851.
- El Shirazy, Habiburrahman (2004). Ayat-Ayat Cinta [Verses of Love] (in Indonesian). Jakarta: Republika. ISBN 978-979-3604-02-2.
- El Shirazy, Habiburrahman (2007). Ketika Cinta Bertasbih [When Love Prays] (in Indonesian). Jakarta: Republika. ISBN 978-979-3210-84-1.
- Nadia, Asma (2013). Assalamualaikum Beijing! [Peace Be With You, Beijing!] (in Indonesian). Jakarta: Noura Books. ISBN 978-602-1606-15-5.
- Nadia, Asma (2014). Surga Yang Tak Dirindukan [An Unyearned Heaven] (in Indonesian). Depok: AsmaNadia Publishing House. ISBN 978-623-279-110-7.

== Works cited ==
- Adji, Alberta Natasia (2019). "Assalamualaikum Beijing Repackaged: Habitus, Symbolic Power and Indonesian Cultural Production". Makara Human Behavior Studies in Asia. 23 (2): 161–171. doi:10.7454/hubs.asia.1260619.
- Arimbi, Diah Ariani (2009). Reading Contemporary Indonesian Muslim Women Writers: Representation, Identity and Religion of Muslim Women in Indonesian Fiction. ICAS Publications Series. Amsterdam: Amsterdam University Press. ISBN 978-90-8964-089-5.
- Arnez, Monika (2009). "Dakwah by the Pen: Reading Helvy Tiana Rosa's Bukavu". Indonesia and the Malay World. 37 (107): 45–64. doi:10.1080/13639810902743040.
- Arnez, Monika; Nisa, Eva F. (2016). "Dimensions of Morality: The Transnational Writers' Collective Forum Lingkar Pena". Bijdragen tot de Taal-, Land- en Volkenkunde / Journal of the Humanities and Social Sciences of Southeast Asia. 172 (4): 449–478. doi:10.1163/22134379-17204003.
- Folmer (20 June 2023). "Works for Archipelago from Writer Asma Nadia". Berita Jakarta. Archived from the original on 2 March 2026.
- "Jaringan Forum Lingkar Pena" [Forum Lingkar Pena Network] (in Indonesian). Forum Lingkar Pena. Archived from the original on 4 March 2026.
- Kailani, Najib (2012). "Forum Lingkar Pena and Muslim Youth in Contemporary Indonesia". Review of Indonesian and Malaysian Affairs. 46 (1): 33–53.
- Paramaditha, Intan (2014). The Wild Child's Desire: Cinema, Sexual Politics, and the Experimental Nation in Post-Authoritarian Indonesia (Thesis). New York University. ProQuest 1615118801.
- "Profil Badan Pengurus Pusat Forum Lingkar Pena Masa Bakti 2025-2029" [Profile of the Central Administrative Council of the Forum Lingkar Pena, 2025-2029] (in Indonesian). Forum Lingkar Pena. 2025. Archived from the original on 4 March 2026.
- Sawai, Shiho; Bose, Christine E. (2020). "Transnational-Migrant Domestic Workers' Cultural Activism Online: The Case of an Indonesian Islamic-Writing Group in Hong Kong". International Journal of Japanese Sociology. 29: 88–106. doi:10.1111/ijjs.12106.
- Teguh, Irfan (26 March 2018). "Forum Lingkar Pena: Kisah Dua Dekade Pabrik Penulis Cerita" [Forum Lingkar Pena: A Story of Two Decades at the Storywriter Factory]. Tirto.id (in Indonesian). Archived from the original on 25 December 2022.
- Widodo, Amrih (August–October 2008). "Writing for God: Piety and Consumption in Popular Islam". Inside Indonesia. 93. Archived from the original on 22 September 2008.
