= Surga Yang Tak Dirindukan 2 =

2017 Indonesian film

Surga yang Tak Dirindukan 2
- Theatrical release poster
- Directed by: Hanung Bramantyo
- Written by: Alim Sudio; Hanung Bramantyo; Manoj Punjabi
- Produced by: Manoj Punjabi
- Starring: Fedi Nuril; Raline Shah; Laudya Cynthia Bella; Reza Rahadian; Nora Danish
- Cinematography: Ipung Rachmat Syaiful
- Music by: Tya Subiakto
- Production company: MD Pictures
- Release date: 9 February 2017
- Country: Indonesia
- Languages: Indonesian; Hungarian
- Budget: Rp16 billion (US$1.1 million)
- Box office: US$4.6 million

Surga yang Tak Dirindukan 2 is a religious drama film which is a sequel to the 2015 film Surga Yang Tak Dirindukan, and stars Fedi Nuril, Laudya Cynthia Bella, Raline Shah, Reza Rahadian from the previous film and also Nora Danish. The film was one of the best-selling Indonesian films of 2017.

== Cast ==
- Fedi Nuril – Prasetya
- Laudya Cynthia Bella – Arini
- Reza Rahadian – Syarief Kristof
- Raline Shah – Meirose
- Nora Danish – Sheila
- Kemal Palevi – Amran
- Tanta Ginting – Hartono
- Sandrinna Michelle – Nadia
- Keefe Bazli – Akbar
- Muhadkly Acho – Panji

== Synopsis ==
Meirose (Raline Shah) comes back to the house of Pras (Fedi Nuril) and Arini (Laudya Cynthia Bella). She intends to take Akbar, her son who had been treated by the couple. But this time Arini persuaded and asked Meirose to return to Pras.

Meirose was in doubt. She is now unsure of her life choice between living a future that herself does not know what it is like, or returning to Pras but not to the heart of destroying the happiness of Arini. Meirose is more confused when Pras, the man she still loves appears in front of her.

Why did Arini insist on persuading Meirose to return to Pras? What did Pras do, whether he would accept Meirose, while he was still doubtful of his ability as a human being to be fair to two wives. Who is also the figure of the doctor Syarief (Reza Rahadian) who suddenly appeared in their lives?

== Production ==
The film's budget increased threefold because it was filmed in Budapest and Szentendre, Hungary. The film's producer and CEO of MD Pictures, Manoj Punjabi claimed that the film's budget is more than Rp16 billion.

== Release ==
The film was released on 9 February 2017, with 105,000 people watching the film on the release date. The film has been watched by 1,637,472 people by the end of 2017, making it one of the best-selling Indonesian films of the year, after Pengabdi Setan, Warkop DKI Reborn: Jangkrik Boss Part 2, Danur: I Can See The Ghosts and Jailangkung.
