= Fedi Nuril =

Indonesian actor, model, and musician (born 1982)

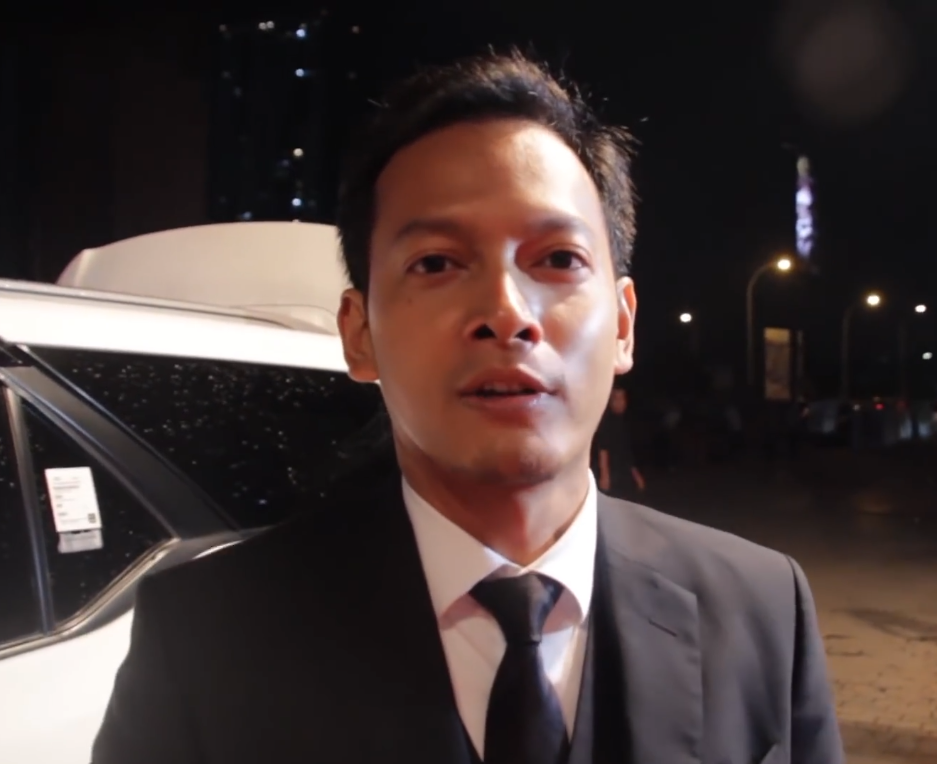
- Nuril at the Gala Premiere of Ayat-Ayat Cinta 2
- Born: 1 July 1982 (age 44); Jakarta, Indonesia
- Education: University of Indonesia (S.Ak.)
- Occupations: Actor; model; musician
- Years active: 2004–present

Fedi Nuril (born 1 July 1982) is an Indonesian actor, model, and musician. He is known for his roles as Fahri in Ayat-Ayat Cinta (2008) and Ayat-Ayat Cinta 2 (2016), and as Genta in 5 cm (2012). Nuril has been referred to as an icon of polygamy Indonesian cinema.

== Early life ==
Fedrian Nuril was born on 1 July 1982 in Jakarta, Indonesia, as the youngest child and son of Tuty (born 1951) and Nuril Rachman, a soldier. He had a brother, Marzuki "Uki" Nuril. His parents were migrants of Minangkabau descent. Nuril went to the Faculty of Economics and Business at University of Indonesia, and majored in accounting.

== Personal life ==
Nuril is married to Vanny Widyasasti, a businesswoman, at Balai Sudirman Hall in Jakarta on 17 January 2016. They have three sons: Hasan Fadilah, Aksa Ganindra, and Kay Mahdi Nuril.

== Career ==
Nuril started his career as a catwalk, magazine, and advertisement model. He made his film debut by starring in Rudy Soedjarwo-directed Mengejar Matahari (2004), followed by Apa Artinya Cinta? (2005), and Janji Joni (2005). Nuril was then cast by director Mira Lesmana to star in Garasi (2006) as a member of a music band called Garasi, along with Ayu Ratna and Aries Budiman. After the film was finished, Garasi released a single titled "Hilang," which received positive reviews from music listeners. In 2007, Hanung Bramantyo cast him in Ayat-Ayat Cinta (2008), a film adapted from the Habiburrahman El Shirazy novel, and Nuril played a role as Fahri in that Movie. Nuril later won an award for Best Actor from the film at Bandung Film Festival in 2008.

Nuril was cast as Rendy in Get Married 3 (2011), the third film in the Get Married series, co-starring Nirina Zubir. In 2013, he starred in Moga Bunda Disayang Allah as a drunkard. He then starred in Ayah: Menyayangi Tanpa Akhir (2015) as Juna, a pharmacist and single parent who is struggling to cure his children of brain cancer, followed by Surga Yang Tak Dirindukan (2015) as a man who practices polygamy co-starring Raline Shah, and then starred in the sequel of the film two years later. In 2017, Nuril starred in Ayat-Ayat Cinta 2, a sequel to the film with the same name, as Fahri. The film attracted a million viewers and received a mixed review due to the plot. Due to his role in the Ayat-Ayat Cinta and Surga Yang Tak Dirindukan series, Nuril was considered a polygamy icon in Indonesian cinema.

In 2021, Nuril starred in Surga Yang Tak Dirindukan 3, a third installment of the Surga Yang Tak Dirindukan series. He also starred in 48 Jam Untuk Indah (2022) as a father who lived in poverty, followed by Air Mata di Ujung Sajadah (2023) as a husband who was fighting for custody of his adopted child. To break his polygamy image, Nuril starred in Rumah Masa Depan (2023) as Sukri co-starring Laura Basuki as his wife Surti. He also starred in Kapan Hamil (2023) again with Basuki.

== Views ==
=== Political views ===
Nuril is an actor with critical views and upholds human rights, and often shows his arguments to the media. During the 2024 Indonesian presidential election, he is against second candidate Prabowo Subianto and Gibran Rakabuming Raka, and said that he won't vote for them due to Prabowo being the perpetrator of kidnapping activists during the fall of Suharto in 1998. He also defended Maria Catarina Sumarsih, an activist who initiated the Kamisan action, which is considered to have raised human rights issues regarding Prabowo as the perpetrator of kidnapping every five years, and added that he did not want the perpetrator of the kidnapping during the 1998 riots to become president.

Nuril received both positive and negative responses to his actions. He also became viral on X and was accused of doing a black campaign by Prabowo's supporters.

== Citations ==
=== Works cited ===
- Wahyuningsih, Sri (2019-06-25). FILM DAN DAKWAH: MEMAHAMI REPRESENTASI PESAN-PESAN DAKWAH DALAM FILM MELALUI ANALISIS SEMIOTIK (in Indonesian). Media Sahabat Cendekia. ISBN 978-623-90831-2-0.
