= Hayya 3: Gaza =

- Directed by: Jastis Arimba
- Written by: Ali Eunoia; Jastis Arimba
- Produced by: Helvy Tiana Rosa; Asma Nadia
- Starring: Cut Syifa; Amna Shahab; Oki Setiana Dewi; Meyda Sefira
- Music by: Dwiki Dharmawan
- Production companies: Warna Pictures; 786 Productions
- Release date: June 12, 2025
- Country: Indonesia
- Language: Indonesian

Hayya 3: Gaza is a 2025 Indonesian family drama film produced by Warna Pictures and 786 Productions that is a sequel to Hayya: The Power of Love 2 and Hayya 2: Hope, Dream and Reality. Directed by Jastis Arimba, the film stars Cut Syifa (in her film debut), Amna Shahab and Oki Setiana Dewi.

== Cast ==
- Cut Syifa as Rafah Shafira
- Azami Syauqi as Gaza
- Asma Shahab as Hayya
- Adhin Abdul Halim as Adhin
- Oki Setiana Dewi as Ustadzah Dewi
- Meyda Sefira as Yasna
- Fauzi Baadila as Rahmat
- Arafah Rianti as Yuyun
- Keyla Arcelia as Febri
- Aryani Fitriana as Rusmini
- Donny Michael as Firman
- Erick Yusuf as Ustadz Yusuf
- Husein Alatas as Ustadz Adam
- Mario Irwinsyah as Mario
- Ridwan Raoull Rohaz as Ridwan
- Andi Biru Laut as Andi
- Anyun Cadel as Cahyo
- Andy Boim as Boim

== Music ==
The film's orchestral score was composed and conducted by Dwiki Dharmawan, replacing Izzat Peterson from the previous two installments.

== Release ==
The film was released on June 12, 2025, alongside The Super Frugal Family, The Dark House, Senyum Manies Love Story and GJLS: Ibuku Ibu-Ibu.
