= Lentera Merah =

- Malaysian DVD cover
- Directed by: Hanung Bramantyo
- Written by: Gina S. Noer
- Produced by: Subagio S. Gope T. Samtani; Sunil Samtani
- Starring: Laudya Cynthia Bella; Dimas Beck; Firrina Sinatrya; Teuku Wisnu; Fikri Ramadhan; Kartika Indah Pelapory; Saputra; Tesadesrada Ryza; Beauty Oehmke; Auxilia Paramitha; Zainal Arifin
- Edited by: Andi Pulung
- Music by: Wiwiex Soedarno
- Distributed by: Rapi Films
- Release date: May 2006
- Running time: 100 minutes
- Country: Indonesia
- Language: Indonesian

Lentera Merah (English translation: Red Lantern) is a 2006 Indonesian horror film directed by Hanung Bramantyo.

== Plot ==
Lentera Merah is a long-standing campus magazine at University of Indonesia) a.k.a. UI, known for its critical and bold writing. After the suppression of PKI members in the 1960s, Lentera Merah remains popular today, boasting a challenging style of writing.

The five core teams of Class of 49; Iqbal (Dimas Beck), Arif (Teuku Wisnu), Wulan (Firrina Sinatrya) and Dinda (Kartika Indah Pelapory) along with Bayu (Saputra) and Rio (Fikri Ramadhan) are currently preparing for the acceptance of new LM members. Previously, they went through a period of trauma because their parents who were formerly LM members, now died one by one. Only Iqbal's father, Abdi (Yusef Muldiyana) is still around, but he has gone abroad leaving him and his mother.

The best five were chosen based on the existing tasks, including a mysterious girl named Risa Apriliyanti (Laudya Cynthia Bella) who managed to win the sympathy of the male seniors even though Risa ignored her. In an assignment before Initiation Night (a night where prospective LM members had to look for the lantern of truth stored in parts of the campus) Risa gave a statement that the article written by Wulan was almost the same as the article written 20 years ago. That night when Wulan checked the article in the library (and it was not there) she was attacked by a ghost and ended up hanging from the library ceiling the next morning. There was a message that said "65" which was also left by Bayu and Wulan. Two deaths were enough to make the dean decide to cancel the initiation night. But without the dean's knowledge, the 49th generation team held it.

That night. They slowly began to get used to searching for lanterns based on Risa's analytical skills, which were always correct. Until Risa disappeared because she was chased by a ghost. Meanwhile, one by one the members of 49 themselves died like Rio and Dinda. Iqbal sensed something was wrong and invited Arif to go to the library to find the meaning of "65" which was also beside Rio and Dinda's bodies. Arif was injured in the stomach thanks to a stab from Dinda's ghost. Then Iqbal met Risa and together they tried to leave the campus. Elsewhere, Abdi, Iqbal's father, had returned. Iqbal's mother was entrusted with a letter while Abdi walked to campus alone.

For the initiation participants, they began to feel their own terror and ended up locked in the library. There they found the 1965 LM archives that included the parents' biodata of the initiation participants. Apparently, the participants also suffered the same fate as the previous batch, namely having blood relations with previous LM members. And they were shocked to find Risa's archive there. They also realized that Risa was actually a ghost. They watched an old video of the initiation night where Risa was. They realized that Risa had been killed because of her idealism and ended up being killed by her seniors. Risa planned to avenge everyone who had become members of Lentera Merah. Abandoned by Iqbal who was looking for participants, Arif was killed by Risa.

Abdi recounted the story when he met Iqbal, who had already met with the participants. Risa was slandered for being part of the government's opposition and ended up locked up in an unfinished part of the campus. Her body was buried on the floor after she ran out of breath. The participants searched for Risa's hidden grave and promptly buried her properly, while Risa strangled Abdi. Just as Abdi died, Risa's spirit calmed down and vanished.

The film ends with Iqbal going to Semeru to escape from stress while the Red Lantern building is closed.

== Cast ==
- Laudya Chintya Bella as Risa
- Tesadesrada Riza as Riki
- Beauty Oehmke as Lia
- Auxilia Paramitha as Muti
- Zainal Ariffin as Yoga
- Firrina Sinatrya as Wulan
- Dimas Beck as Iqbal
- Saputra as Bayu

== Production ==
Lentera Merah had a screenplay by Gina S. Noer. According to Evi Mariani of The Jakarta Post, the title is reminiscent of Soe Hok Gie's history of the Indonesian Communist Party, Di Bawah Lentera Merah (Beneath the Red Lantern).

Lentera Merah was directed by Hanung Bramantyo, a Yogyakarta-born director educated in Muhammadiyah schools in Yogyakarta. As his birthday fell the day after the anniversary of the 30 September Movement, suspected to have been led by communists, Bramantyo had long been interested in communism. His first short film, Tlutur, dealt with the party. For Lentera Merah, Bramantyo focused on the horror aspects of the story, showing only a ghost of a communist party member. He was dismissive of the results, saying that "like Musashi who once fought with only one hand, I [made the film] half-heartedly," Although most of Bramantyo's films were to the political right, Lentera Merah was to the left.

The film had a low budget but spent Rp. 15-20 million (US$2,000-2,500) for the make-up of one actor.

== Release and reception ==
Lentera Merah was released in mid-May 2006, a period where Indonesian theatres were filled with local horror films. It was viewed by 300,000 persons.

A write-up in Tempo magazine called the film's historical research weak, and found that as a whole the combination of history and horror did not work well.

== Awards ==
Lentera Merah was nominated for two Citra Awards at the 2006 Indonesian Film Festival but did not win any.

Award	Year	Category	Recipient	Result
Indonesian Film Festival	2006	Best Artistic Arrangement	Allan Sebastian	Nominated
Indonesian Film Festival	2006	Best Music Arrangement	Wiwiex Sudarno	Nominated
