= 5 cm (film) =

- Theatrical release poster
- Directed by: Rizal Mantovani
- Written by: Sunil Soraya
- Screenplay by: Donny Dhirgantoro
- Based on: 5 cm by Donny Dhirgantoro
- Produced by: Rizal Mantovani
- Starring: Herjunot Ali; Fedi Nuril; Pevita Pearce; Saykoji; Denny Sumargo; Raline Shah
- Cinematography: Yudi Datau
- Music by: Nidji
- Production company: Soraya Intercine Films
- Release date: December 12, 2012
- Running time: 126 minutes
- Country: Indonesia
- Language: Indonesian
- Box office: US$6.3 million

5 cm is an Indonesian drama film, directed by Rizal Mantovani and starring Herjunot Ali and Fedi Nuril. It is based on the novel 5 cm by Donny Dhirgantoro, and was released on December 12, 2012.

== Soundtrack album ==
5 cm Original Motion Pictures Soundtrack is a mini album released by Nidji and released by Musica Studios on January 4, 2013. The album is not officially sold in physical format, but are available only through digital podcast services such as iTunes and MelOn.

== Casts ==
The main cast in the movie 5cm:

1. Fedi Nuril as Genta
2. Herjunot Ali as Zafran
3. Raline Shah as Riani
4. Igor Saykoji as Ian
5. Deni Sumargo as Arial
6. Pevita Pearce as Dinda (Arial's sister)

== Awards ==
In the 2013 Indonesian Film Festival, 5 cm competed with another box office at the time, Habibie & Ainun, in many nominations. Yudi Datau was awarded as the best cinematographer.
