= Annida =

Indonesian Islamic teen magazine

- Cover, 15 October – 15 November 2006
- Frequency: Monthly (1991–1999); Fortnightly (beginning 1999)
- Circulation: 90,000/month (1999); 25,000/month (2009)
- Publisher: Ummi Group
- First issue: May 1991; 35 years ago
- Final issue: June 2009; 17 years ago
- Country: Indonesia
- Based in: Jakarta
- Language: Indonesian

Annida (literally "gentle call") was an Islamic teen magazine published in Indonesia between 1991 and 2009, with an online edition continuing until 2015. Initially focused on adult women readers, in 1993 the magazine was acquired by the Ummi Group and reoriented toward teenage girls. Teenage girls remained the primary audience for much of Annida's existence, although efforts were made to attract male readers.

Initially published on a monthly basis, the magazine switched to a fortnightly schedule as its readership surpassed 90,000 per month. It dealt with a variety of issues affecting Indonesian Muslims, but mostly focused on short works of fiction. Many of its writers were members of the collective Forum Lingkar Pena.

== History ==
Annida was established in 1991, with its inaugural issue published in May. The magazine took its name from the Arabic word النداء (an-nidāʾ), present in Surah Maryam, Verse 2, of the Qur'an, which translates to "gentle call". Initially, the magazine was intended for adult Muslim women, with a goal of promoting Islamic practices based on the Qur'an and hadiths. It was presented as an alternative to non-Islamic magazines, which it described as jahiliyyah (ignorance). The magazine was initially under editor-in-chief Dwi Septiawati, and later under Helvy Tiana Rosa.

In September 1993, Annida joined the Ummi Group, which also published the magazines Ummi and Saksi. It introduced a new mascot, a caricature of a young bespectacled woman wearing a hijab, and refocused its material to attract teenage women readers. Annida began to provide dedicated space for works of fiction with Islamic themes, under the banner of "Seri Kisah-Kisah Islami" ("Series of Islamic Stories"). Works published included short stories by Rosa, Dewi Fitri Lestari, and Dwi Septiawati. In a 1998 edition, Rosa wrote that she received dozens of stories every day.

From its establishment, Annida was published on a monthly basis. In 1999, when circulation reached 90,000 copies per issue, it switched to publishing every two weeks. Although the magazine was headquartered in Jakarta, readership was spread through the Indonesian Archipelago. It also began using the slogan "Sahabat Remaja Berbagi Cerita" ("A Friend for Teenagers to Share Stories"). Works by members of the writers' collective Forum Lingkar Pena were included regularly, as were advertisements for the collective. Efforts were made to attract male readers beginning in the late 1990s.

In August 2001, Rosa resigned from the position of editor-in-chief. Leadership of the magazine was taken by Dian Yasmina Fajri, and Annida took a new slogan: "Cerdas, Gaul, Syar'i" ("Smart, Cool, Islamic"). By 2003, the magazine had a circulation of 100,000 per month. Fajri ended her editorship in August 2005. Under the new editor-in-chief, Muhammad Yulius—the magazine's first male leader—Annida changed its slogan to "Inspirasi Tak Bertepi" ("Unbound Inspiration"). In a 2022 interview, he recalled that this had been intended in part to expand the reach of the magazine.

In June 2009, the print edition of Annida was discontinued, due to the changing technological environment resulting in less demand; between 2007 and 2010, an average of 25,000 copies were sold per month. Activities moved to annida-online.com, though in 2013 a print-on-demand version was announced, available thrice a year. Although short stories continued to be published, discussion of Islamic issues became less comprehensive. Readership dropped to 10,000 visitors per month, and in 2015 the online edition of Annida was discontinued.

== Format and contents ==
Issues of Annida were smaller in format then many contemporaries, measuring 15.5 by 24 centimetres (6.1 in × 9.4 in). Early editions of the magazine averaged 64 pages, with colour used only on the covers. In the 2000s, the magazine began averaging 96 pages, with more colour. Due to this format, Annida was cheaper than many of its contemporaries.

Covers of Annida varied throughout its existence, with the first edition featuring an adult woman reading a book. Later editions included animals, panoramas, and flowers. Some covers were illustrated, while others were photographs. Regarding individuals featured on the cover, Annida implemented a guideline that it would only use persons who demonstrated integrity and piety. Women had to wear a hijab in their everyday lives, and models could not be smokers.

Annida included several long-lasting columns, including areas for stories, encyclopaedic articles, and notes. After the third year, each edition included a comic featuring its mascot. Non-fiction content primarily dealt with popular culture, including fashion, although the magazine also included information on religious living, personal advice, and contemporary politics, including developments in the Islamic world. Annida promoted close adherence to Sharia law, including Islamic dress codes as well as the avoidance of friendships between men and women. Unlike more hardline magazines such as Sabili or Saksi, it did not criticize religions other than Islam.

Annida also included short stories, which were expected to fulfil three criteria: avoid focusing on women's bodies and sexuality, depict pious Muslim women, and present women firmly adherent to their ideology. Stories covered a variety of themes and issues, including the concept of jihad, religious moderatism, and technology. Authors published in Annida included Helvy Tiana Rosa, her sister Asma Nadia, the author of Lupus Hilman Hariwijaya, and Habiburrahman El Shirazy. Many of the authors published in Annida were Forum Lingkar Pena members.

== Works cited ==
- Arnez, Monika (2009). "Dakwah by the Pen: Reading Helvy Tiana Rosa's Bukavu". Indonesia and the Malay World. 37 (107): 45–64. doi:10.1080/13639810902743040.
- Irawanto, Budi (2010). "Riding Waves of Change: Islamic Press in Post-Authoritarian Indonesia". In Sen, Krishna; Hill, David (eds.). Politics and the Media in Twenty-First Century Indonesia: Decade of Democracy. London: Routledge. pp. 67–84. ISBN 978-1-136-89148-9.
- Kailani, Najib (2012). "Forum Lingkar Pena and Muslim Youth in Contemporary Indonesia". Review of Indonesian and Malaysian Affairs. 46 (1): 33–53.
- Mansur, Puteri Soraya (2008). "Annida: Gadis Berkacamata dengan Kerudung yang Berkibar-Kibar" [Annida: A Bespectacled Girl with Her Veil Aflutter]. In Setyowati, Hajar Nur (ed.). Seabad Pers Perempuan: Bahasa Ibu, Bahasa Bangsa [A Century of Women's Press: Mother Tongue, National Language] (in Indonesian). Yogyakarta: I:boekoe. pp. 280 –&#32, 283. ISBN 978-979-1436-08-3.
- Sa'yati, Lena; Tjahjandari, Lily (2023). "Transformasi Majalah Annida Masa Akhir Cetak: Nilai-Nilai Moderatisme Islam pada Dua Cerpen Dekade 2000-An (Tinjauan Sosiologi Sastra)" [Transformation of the Magazine Annida at the End of Printing: Moderate Islamic Values in Two Short Stories from the 2000s (A Sociology of Literature Study)]. Suluk. 5 (2): 131–153. doi:10.15642/suluk.2023.5.2.131-153.
- Yuniati, Siska (2016). "Ketika Annida Menyapa Siswa" [When Annida Spoke to Students]. In Setiyanto, Edi (ed.). Literasi, Pendidikan, dan Karakter: Cencang Putus, Tiang Tembuk [Literacy, Education, and Character: A Binding Decision] (in Indonesian). Yogyakarta: Yogyakarta Language Council. pp. 44–53. ISBN 978-602-6284-67-9.
