= Asma Nadia =

Indonesian writer (born 1972)

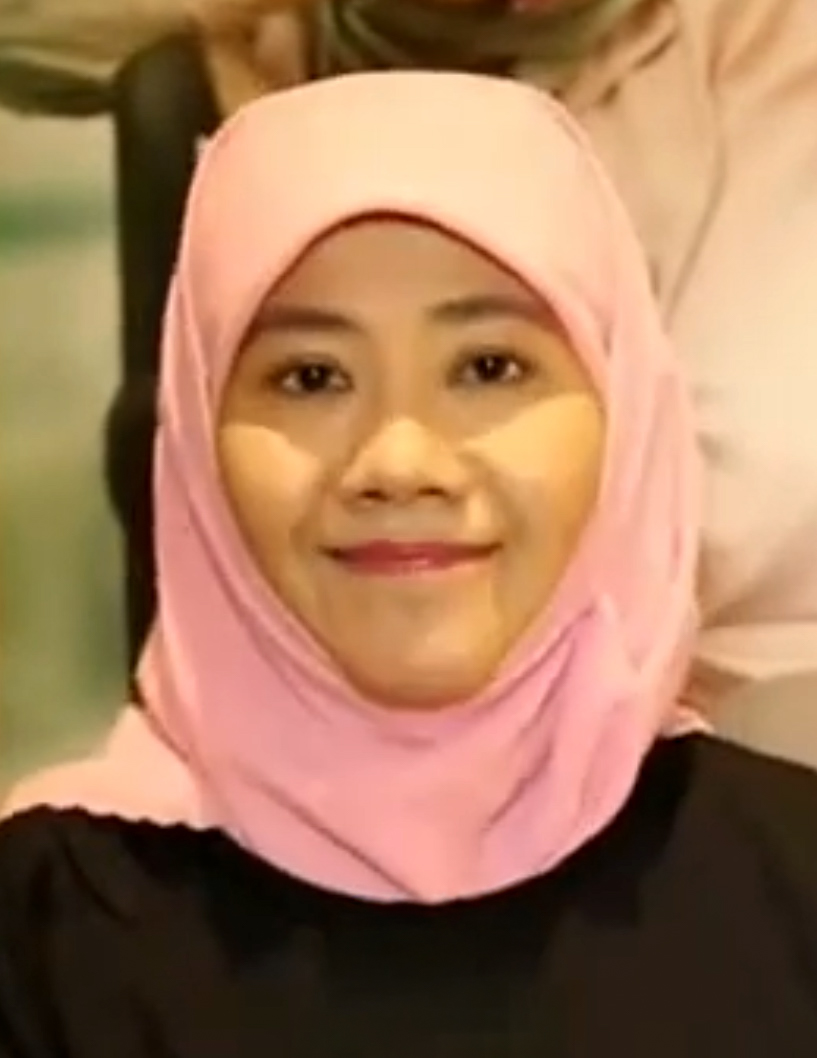
- Nadia in 2018
- Born: Asmarani Rosalba; 26 March 1972 (age 54); Jakarta, Indonesia
- Writing career
- Language: Indonesian
- Years active: 2000–present
- Genres: Romance, travel, Islam
- Literary movement: Forum Lingkar Pena
- Website: asma-nadia.id/en/

Asmarani Rosalba (born 26 March 1972), better known by her pen name Asma Nadia, is an Indonesian writer best known for her novels with Islamic themes. Born in Jakarta, she began writing in elementary school, with her first story published during her studies at the Bogor Agricultural Institute in Bogor. She published her first books in 2000, with her short story collection Rembulan di Mata Ibu (The Moon In Mother's Eyes, 2000) winning an Adikarya IKAPI Award. Since then, she has published more than 70 books, including the novels Surga yang Tak Dirindukan (An Unyearned Heaven) and Assalamualaikum Beijing!, as well as the anthology The Jilbab Traveller (2012). She is a co-founder of Forum Lingkar Pena, a writers' collective that focuses on Islamic themes, and has established more than a hundred libraries.

Nadia's works have been extensively adapted to film, beginning with Emak Ingin Naik Haji (Mother Wants to Go on Hajj) in 2009; works have also been adapted to television and comic. Nadia has appeared in and produced several films. She considers her output part of dakwah (proselytization). She also states that it aims to counter what she perceives to be the sexualization of women and spread of vulgar content in popular media.

== Biography ==
=== Early life ===
Nadia was born in Jakarta on 26 March 1972 to Amin Usman, a man of Acehnese heritage, and Maria Eri Susanti, a woman of Chinese heritage from Medan who converted to Islam. She was the second of three children born to the couple; her elder sister, Helvy Tiana Rosa, is also a writer. As a child, Nadia was exposed to writing from a young age through her father, a lyricist who had written songs for Broery Marantika, Iis Sugianto, and Dewi Yull. She thus began writing her own songs, then expanding to articles and short stories. Nadia attended State Junior High School 78 in Jakarta, then Budi Utama Senior High School 1. In high school, she began to write more seriously.

Nadia attended the Faculty of Agricultural Technology at Bogor Agricultural Institute in Bogor, but left after illness left her unable to continue her studies. While attending university, she submitted numerous works to short story competitions. Her first published work, "Surat Buat Asasullah di Surga" ("A Letter to Asadullah in Heaven"), was included in Annida magazine. Following this success, Nadia began contributing to multiple publications, including the magazines Ummi and Horison and the newspaper Republika.

=== Writing career ===
Nadia co-established the Forum Lingkar Pena with her sister in 1997. This organization, which reported 7,000 members as of 2016, is a writers' collective that primarily serves Muslim readers. Its members, most of whom are women, work collaboratively, with more established writers coaching younger and less experienced ones. With the organization, Nadia has established a mobile lending library among Indonesian migrant workers in Hong Kong.

In 2000, Nadia published her first books. One was a short story collection titled Rembulan di Mata Ibu (The Moon In Mother's Eyes), which received an Adikarya IKAPI Award in 2001. Another was Seranade Biru Dinda (Dinda's Blue Serenade), later republished as Pertama Bilang Cinta (First To Say Love). Others included collaborations with her husband Isa Alamsyah, her sister, and Boim Lebon. In 2001, Nadia attended a writing workshop hosted by Southeast Asian Literary Council; this resulted in her novel Derai Sunyi/Bidadari Berbisik (Rhythm of Silence/Whisper of Angels).

Nadia established her own publishing house, the Asma Nadia Publishing House in 2009. This publisher focuses on works of fiction and non-fiction, including several of Nadia's own works. Other works have been published through Mizan. Nadia received further Adikarya IKAPI Awards for Dialog Dua Layar (A Dialogue of Two Screens) and 101 Dating (2005). In 2009, she was one of the writers in residence at the Le Chateau de Lavigny Writers and Literary Translators program; she also participated in the International Writing Program in Iowa City, United States. As she published these novels, she continued to write songs.

Nadia has published numerous books with predominantly Islamic themes. In 2013, she published Assalamualaikum Beijing!, a novel that follows a young Muslim journalist who travels to China after the failure of her engagement. This novel was commercially successful, receiving a film adaptation in 2014, a comic adaptation in 2015, and a television series in 2018. In 2014, she released Surga yang Tak Dirindukan (An Unyearned Heaven), which dealt with the question of polygamy in Islam. Other works include Ummi (Mother, 2012), Pesantren Impian (A School of Dreams, 2016), and Jilbab Traveller: Love Sparks in Korea (2015).

Nadia attended the 2015 Frankfurt Book Fair, which centered around Indonesian authors. She worked with the fashion designer Dian Pelangi to spread awareness of hijab etiquette. Nadia was included in the 2023 edition of the Jordan-based Royal Islamic Strategic Studies Centre's The 500 Most Influential Muslims; she was one of three Indonesian artists included. Through her I Can Write community, Nadia has created libraries for and promoted writing among underprivileged youths. There were some 140 of these libraries, known as Rumah Baca Asma Nadia (Asma Nadia Reading Houses), in 2022. By 2022, Nadia had published more than seventy books.

=== Film career ===
In 2009, the first feature film to be based on one of Nadia's works was released. Titled Emak Ingin Naik Haji (Mother Wants to Go on Hajj), the film was based on the short story of the same name. The following year, a film adaptation of her novel Assalamualaikum Beijing! was released. Directed by Guntur Soeharjanto and starring Revalina S. Temat and Morgan Oey, the film sold more than 560,000 tickets in its theatrical run.

The 2015 adaptation of Nadia's novel Surga yang Tak Dirindukan was the best-selling Indonesian film of the year. This film was followed by two sequels, though the theatrical release of the third instalment was cancelled due to the COVID-19 pandemic. Other adaptations of her novels have included Jilbab Traveller: Love Sparks in Korea (2016), Pesantren Impian (A School of Dreams, 2016), and Cinta Laki-Laki Biasa (An Ordinary Man's Love, 2017). By 2022, thirteen of her works had been adapted to film.

Nadia has also served as producer on several films, including Hayya 2: Dream, Hope, and Reality (2022) and Hayya 3: Gaza (2025); for the latter, she also wrote the screenplay. As of 2026, she has acted in three films: Duka Sedalam Cinta (Grief as Deep as Love, 2017), 212: The Power of Love (2018), and Hayya: The Power of Love 2.

=== Personal life ===
Nadia is married to the writer Isa Alamsyah. They have two children, Eva Maria Putri Salsabila and Adam Putra, both of whom have written with Forum Lingkar Pena.

Nadia is a fervent traveller, having visited 545 cities across 72 countries as of 2023. These experiences with travel have provided a basis for some of her works, with her anthology The Jilbab Traveller compiling the experiences of women travellers in countries such as South Korea, France, and the Dominican Republic. In the 2012 edition, she contributed the foreword and a chapter on her experiences in South Korea. These books also include information considered useful for Muslims abroad, such as tips for finding halal food and mosques.

== Style ==
Nadia approaches writing as a form of dakwah (proselytization). She has embraced film adaptations of her works as a means of further promulgating her religious messages, stating in a 2016 interview: "You know, one book can only have around fifty thousand readers. But when it is filmed, let alone a box office film, our dakwah could reach 4.6 million people!" She identifies her works as countering the sexualization of women and spread of vulgar content in mainstream popular culture, thereby bringing audiences closer to Islamic values; this is contrasted specifically with the works produced by the sastra wangi movement, which are deemed overly sexual. In Nadia's writing, conservative Islamic values are often combined with an emphasis on hard work, dedication, and pursuing one's dreams.

Exploring the presentation of morality in works published by Forum Lingkar Pena, Monika Arnez and Eva Nisa state Nadia's works "emphasize that using Islamic symbols such as the jilbab (veil) is a way of demonstrating one's self-assertiveness as a Muslim woman". Alberta Natasia Adji, a lecturer at Airlangga University, similarly notes Nadia's emphasis on formal religious practices and symbols, writing that these are prioritized over "sub[s]tantial issues such as women's rights, polygamy, freedom of speech, corruption, and inclusive political practices". On the other hand, Diah Ariani Arimbi of Airlangga University emphasizes the protagonists of Nadia's novels as "independent, global, modern, brave, fun, and stylish, yet very pious" women who proactively choose to travel and develop themselves.

== Works cited ==
- Adji, Alberta Natasia (2019). "Assalamualaikum Beijing Repackaged: Habitus, Symbolic Power and Indonesian Cultural Production". Makara Human Behavior Studies in Asia. 23 (2): 161–171. doi:10.7454/hubs.asia.1260619.
- Arimbi, Diah Ariani (2022). "Being Religious, Cool, and Global in the Eyes of Indonesian Muslim Women Writers: Negotiating Religion and Popular Lifestyle in Islamic Pop Novels". In Jussawalla, Feroza; Omran, Doaa (eds.). Muslim Women's Writing from across South and Southeast Asia. Taylor & Francis. pp. 167–178. ISBN 978-1-000-60247-0.
- Arnez, Monika; Nisa, Eva F. (2016). "Dimensions of Morality: The Transnational Writers' Collective Forum Lingkar Pena". Bijdragen tot de Taal-, Land- en Volkenkunde. 172 (4): 449–478. doi:10.1163/22134379-17204003. JSTOR 44325674.
- Astuti, Tia Agnes (19 January 2015). "Mengintip Rumah Inspiratif Penulis Asma Nadia di Depok" [Peeking at the Inspirational Home of Writer Asma Nadia in Depok]. Detik.com (in Indonesian). Archived from the original on 2 March 2026.
- Barker, Thomas (2019). Indonesian Cinema after the New Order: Going Mainstream. Hong Kong University Press. ISBN 978-988-8528-07-3.
- "Daftar Lengkap Pemeran dan Kru Assalamualaikum Beijing" [Complete List of Cast and Crew Assalamualaikum Beijing]. filmindonesia.or.id (in Indonesian). Konfiden Foundation. Archived from the original on 26 February 2026.
- "Filmografi Asma Nadia" [Filmography for Asma Nadia]. filmindonesia.or.id (in Indonesian). Konfiden Foundation. Archived from the original on 2 March 2026.
- Fazrullah, Mohammad Aqshal (5 November 2022). "Profil Asma Nadia, Tetap Menulis Meski Sedang Diuji" [Profile of Asma Nadia, Still Writing Despite Challenges]. Pikiran Rakyat (in Indonesian). Archived from the original on 2 March 2026.
- Folmer (20 June 2023). "Works for Archipelago from Writer Asma Nadia". Berita Jakarta. Archived from the original on 2 March 2026.
- Pane, J. (2018). "Conflict in Asma Nadia's Novel Surga Yang Tak Dirindukan". KNE Social Sciences. 3 (4): 404–410. doi:10.18502/kss.v3i4.1951.
- The Muslim 500: The World's Most Influential Muslims, 2023 (PDF). Jordan: Royal Islamic Strategic Studies Centre. 2022. Archived from the original (PDF) on 2 November 2025.
- Supandi, Maycherlita (2017). "Perempuan Dalam Novel Dakwah: Kajian Karya Asma Nadia Dalam Perspektif Hall". Lakon : Jurnal Kajian Sastra Dan Budaya. 6: 1–12. doi:10.20473/lakon.v6i1.6789.
