= Kakak =

- Theaterical Poster Film
- Directed by: Ivander Tedjasukmana
- Screenplay by: Ivander Tedjasukmana
- Based on: true story
- Produced by: Chand Parvez Servia, Ardiawan Renaldy
- Starring: Laudya Cynthia Bella; Surya Saputra; Ivanka Suwandi; Gading Marten; Miea Kusuma; Yafi Tesa Zahara
- Cinematography: Edi Michael Santoso
- Edited by: Angga Evron
- Music by: Fajar Yuskemal
- Production company: Firefly CInema
- Distributed by: Starvision Plus
- Release date: November 5, 2015
- Running time: 85 minutes
- Country: Indonesia
- Language: Indonesian

Kakak (lit. 'Sister') is a 2015 Indonesian horror film, based on true story from the Director – Ivander Tedjasukmana. The film was directed by Ivander Tedjasukmana, written by Ivander Tedjasukmana & Kim Kematt, and stars Laudya Cynthia Bella, Surya Saputra, and Yafi Tessa Zahara. This film was released on November 5, 2015.

== Plot ==
Adi (Surya Saputra) and Kirana (Laudya Cynthia Bella) have been married for a long time but are still childless. Kirana's body is weak due to her asthma and has experienced three miscarriages, causing stress and depression. They still live with Adi's mother, Aida (Ivanka Suwandi), who doesn't approve of Kirana mostly because she's been unable to bear a child. Trying to relieve his wife's stress, Adi decides that a move to a neighborhood outside of town would be the best for them both. Kirana starts to feel that there is something strange with their new home, that something else is present with them. At first she is afraid, but over time she becomes used to the presence, a girl ghost who she calls “SISTER”. Adi becomes worried about Kirana's closeness with “SISTER”, but Kirana believes that “SISTER” is a kind and gentle soul. Adi decides to put aside his worries as he sees Kirana become more and more happy. Their happiness and closeness changes when Kirana becomes pregnant. “SISTER” begins to terrorize them because of jealousy. Aida also decides to stay with them in order to support Kirana. “SISTER” hurts Aida and tries to hurt Kirana and her baby. Adi struggles to protect his wife and unborn child from SISTER's wrath.

== Production ==
The film was produced in December 2014 and took eight days of filming. The film is 85 minutes long. The director, Ivander Tedjasukmana, said that the film was based on the true story of a grandfather and his grandchild. He said that the story is developed with elements of drama to make the audience interested in the characters. According to the screenwriter, Kim Kematt, "This is a drama film with horror spices. The audience will see something new. That, horror films can not only show fear and shock. But there are also very strong stories. Furthermore, the point is, we all live side by side with other dimensions." The film sparked controversy because Laudya Cynthia Bella is not wearing a hijab (veil) in the film even though Bella has worn a hijab since January 2015. She clarified on October 27, 2015, that this film was shot before Bella made her decision to wear a hijab.

== Release ==
The film's release was delayed from March 2015 to November 2015, because of 21 Cineplex's tight schedule and the need to cut some scenes.

== Reception ==
According to Puput Puji Lestari from Fimela, this film is not an ordinary horror and it provides drama and comedy between the tension. She praised Bella's and Saputra's acting but thought that the sound arrangement is "loose".
