= Raline Shah =

Indonesian actress (born 1985)

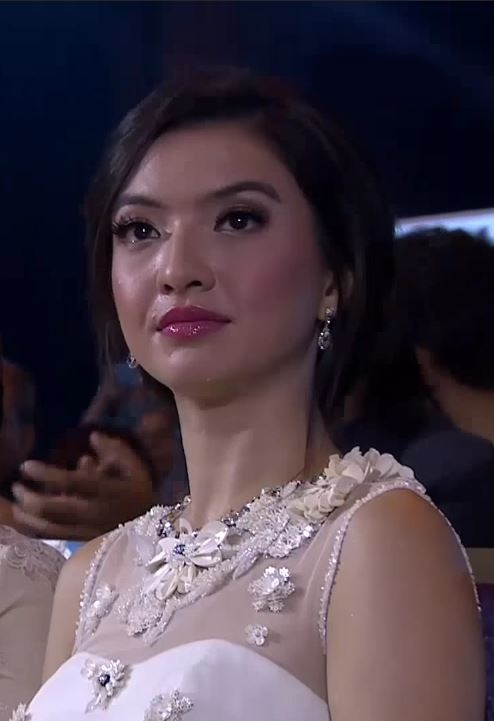
- Raline at Festival Film Indonesia 2015
- Born: March 4, 1985 (age 41); Jakarta, Indonesia
- Education: Political Science; New Media and Communication
- Alma mater: National University of Singapore
- Occupations: Actress, philanthropist, public figure, entrepreneur
- Years active: 2008–present

Raline Rahmat Shah (born March 4, 1985) is an Indonesian actress, philanthropist, public figure, opera singer and entrepreneur. She entered mainstream Indonesian entertainment scene with her appearance as one of the contestants of Puteri Indonesia 2008 representing North Sumatra, winning the title Putri Favorit Indonesia (Miss Favorite of Indonesia) by popular vote. Her career in the Indonesian film scene started with her portrayal as Riani in the Indonesian blockbuster movie, 5 cm. She became well known in Malaysia for her appearance in the 2018 Malaysian action film Polis Evo 2 (known as Police Evo in Indonesia).

Raline garnered critical acclaim for her role in Surga yang Tak Dirindukan, including Best Supporting Actress at the 2015 Bandung Film Festival and the 2016 Indonesian Box Office Movie Awards, along with nomination at 2015 Indonesian Film Festival. She also received nominations at 2014 Bandung Film Festival for her role in 99 Cahaya di Langit Eropa and at 2018 Indonesian Box Office Movie Awards for her role in Surga yang Tak Dirindukan 2.

Raline is famous for her philanthropic contribution. Together with Valencia Mieke Randa and Vivy Tolgay, she co-founded Rumah Harapan Indonesia, an organization which helps house and lodge children requiring treatments for cancer and other serious health conditions. Raline also collaborated with 3 Little Angels to launch the Love ReSolution campaign which seeks to raise funds for critically ill children in need of treatment.

Raline has an interest in mountain climbing, having conquered several peaks such as Mount Rinjani in Lombok, Indonesia and Mount Kilimanjaro in Tanzania. Raline has also ventured into the food and beverages business. In 2019, she co-founded KISAKU, a coffee shop based in Jakarta.

== Early life and education ==
Raline Rahmat Shah was born on March 4, 1985, in Jakarta, Indonesia. She is the daughter of Rahmat Shah, an entrepreneur and former Senator in Indonesia's People's Consultive Assembly (1999–2024) and Regional Representative Council (2009–2004), and Roseline Abu, a philanthropist and long-time head of Yayasan Pembinaan Anak Cacat (YPAC) Medan, a school for children with disabilities. Raline is of Malay (Malaysian and Deli Malay), Chinese and Pakistani descent, with ancestral roots in Malacca and Johor Bahru in Malaysia and Singapore. She has two younger brothers, Rollin and Rollan.

Raline spent her early life in Jakarta and Medan, before moving to Johor Bahru, Malaysia in 1998. She attended Kolej Tuanku Ja'afar, a boarding school in Negeri Sembilan, Malaysia. She directed 2 school plays, acted in 3 musicals and various theatre productions. She was awarded Silver Youth International Award in 2002 and Gold International Youth Award in 2003 for an all rounder achievement in sports, arts and dedication to the community. She also received "Best Business Studies Academic Achievement Award" for O-Level and A-Level results. She also attained the Gold Duke of Edinburgh award for exploration, hiking, and social work.

She later attended National University of Singapore where she studied political science, and received a degree in Political Science & New Media and Communications in 2007. She was a vocalist for NUS Jazz club and performed twice at Singapore International Festival of Arts.

== Life and career ==
=== 2008–2013: Career beginnings ===
Raline was a part-time model for Mannequin Studios from 2004 to 2008. She was also part of the Public Relations Department of Paragon Medical from 2008 to 2011. Her entry into the mainstream Indonesian entertainment landscape was as one of the contestants of Puteri Indonesia 2008 where she represented North Sumatra. She was chosen in the Top 5 and was awarded the title "Putri Favorit Indonesia" by popular vote.

Raline's acting debut started in 2012 where she took part in her first movie, 5 cm, directed by Rizal Mantovani. 5 cm is a novel by Donny Dhirgantoro which was published in 2005 and tells the story of five friends (Arial, Riani, Zafran, Ian, and Genta) as they tried to find out what true friendship is while climbing Mount Semeru, the highest peak in Java. Raline played as Riani, the only woman in the group characterized by her high intellect and ambition. The movie was well received by the Indonesian public, becoming one of the highest-grossing movies of the year with 2.40 million viewers and was awarded "Best Cinematography" at 2013 Indonesian Film Festival.

Raline has been working extensively as a commercial and runway model since 2008 both within Indonesia and internationally, her good personality and public image allowing her to work with numerous brands and fashion designers. She represented Cita Tenun Indonesia, an association dedicated to the preservation of traditional Indonesian weaving techniques and providing Indonesian designers international visibility, during the United Nations' Fashion 4 Development (F4D) program in New York in 2012 and 2013, participating along other international personalities and models such as Lily Cole and Carla Sozzani. She was also one of the South East Asian brand ambassadors for the prominent Belgian fashion designer, Diane von Furstenberg, which personally selected Raline herself.

=== 2014–present: Present day ===
Raline starred along with Laudya Chintya Bella and Fedi Nuril in Surga Yang Tak Dirindukan (2015), which enable her to won "Best Supporting Female Role" at the 2015 Bandung Film Festival and to receive a nomination at the 2015 Indonesian Film Festival and 2016 Indonesia Box Office Movie Awards. She also contribute a soundtrack for the film, entitled "Kekasih di Surga".

Raline was an intern for Teater Garasi in 2016. Teater Garasi is a multi-disciplinary performance collective based in Yogyakarta, Indonesia whose works and artists have been promoted into international performing arts circuit in Singapore, Berlin, Tokyo, Shizuoka, Osaka, New York, and Amsterdam.

In July 2017, she released a new song, "Jadi Milikku" a collaboration with Marcell. In 2018, she appears as a main cast with Shaheizy Sam and Zizan Razak in the Malaysian action film, Polis Evo 2, directed by Ghaz Abu Bakar. Released on November 22, 2018, in Malaysia, and on April 18, 2019, in Indonesia, the film became a commercial success. She played the role of Rian, an Indonesian police officer.

She is widely known for her versatility as an artist and public figure. Her pan-Asian features and fluency in both English and Indonesian have enabled her to take on such diverse acting roles as a Turkish immigrant, a Caucasian-Chinese person, as well as characters closer to her traditional Indonesian roots.

Raline is the brand ambassador of Wardah Cosmetics since 2016. She has been the face of Pantene for Procter & Gamble in Singapore, Indonesia, and Malaysia in 2012. She was also a brand ambassador for XL Axiata (2011), Unilever (2012–2013), Hemaviton (2014), Bank Mandiri (2015–2017), and Oppo (2017). Raline was featured as one of Indonesia's fashion icons in 2014-2015 for Harper's Bazaar and Elle Indonesia.

Outside of film, she has also performed in theater, notably with a lead role in the 2013 folklore musical, Timun Mas: The Musical, directed by Rama Soeprapto, a leading Indonesian theater director who worked under American experimental theatre director Robert Wilson.

Raline has a strong social media following, surpassing 10.1 million Instagram followers as of January 2025.

== Philanthropy and business ==
=== Philanthropy ===
Following the footsteps of her mother, Raline has deep passion for volunteer work and has initiated many collaborations with various charities in Indonesia and internationally, such as United Nations' High Commissioner for Refugees (UNHCR) and World Wide Fund for Nature (WWF). In 2017, together with Valencia Mieke Randa and Vivy Tolgay, she co-founded Rumah Harapan Indonesia, a transit home for children under the age of 17 with serious non-communicable diseases, such as leukemia, cancer, tumors, physical abnormalities and bone disorders. The charity aims to provide a comfortable accommodation and support system for children from the rural areas who travel for treatment to the main cities in Indonesia. There are 6 "house of hopes" so far across Indonesia.

In 2016, Raline collaborated with 3 Little Angels to launch Love ReSolution, a campaign which seeks to raise funds for critically ill children in need of treatment. In 2018, Raline co-founded Yayasan Tunas Bakti Nusantara, a charity organization to develop education, health, and welfare support in the most remote regions of Indonesia.

=== Business ===
On August 8, 2017, Raline was appointed as the independent director of Indonesia AirAsia, an Indonesian subsidiary of the Malaysian low-cost airline company, AirAsia. CEO of AirAsia Group, Tony Fernandes, wrote that Raline is chosen as she is "smart, creative, humble", which is what AirAsia needed to stay competitive. He hoped Raline's presence would allow AirAsia to stay relevant among the younger generation.

Her latest entrepreneurial venture is a coffee shop named KISAKU Coffee in Jakarta that was launched in 2019. Kisaku is a Japanese word meaning "positive, open, and friendly", which describes the coffee shop's design philosophy. The place is a manifestation of adaptive reuse of an old and humble one-story residential house into an open and welcoming coffee shop.

== Personal life ==
Raline is an avid traveler and believes in "a world without strangers". She is known for her love of nature and hiking, which started with her first movie, 5 cm, which features her character hiking up Mount Semeru, the biggest volcano and one of the most challenging climbs in Indonesia. She has also successfully reached the peak of Mount Kilimanjaro in Tanzania. Raline is using her large platform to remind her audience to respect nature and to keep the landscape clean when hiking.

Raline is also passionate about physical and spiritual wellness. During her interview with Daniel Mananta, Raline stated that, "Allah wants every person to be healthy, and when we fall ill, it is our duty to find meaning behind the illness by helping others who are not well." She routinely practices meditation, yoga, and detox treatments, finding them to not be in contrast with her religious belief but rather complementary.

== Filmography ==
=== Film ===
Year	Title	Role
2012	5 cm	Riani
2013	99 Cahaya di Langit Eropa	Fatma
2014	99 Cahaya di Langit Eropa Part 2	Fatma
2014	Supernova	Rana
2015	Surga Yang Tak Dirindukan	Meirose
2016	Terpana	Adaline
2017	Surga Yang Tak Dirindukan 2	Meirose
2018	Polis Evo 2	Rian
2019	Orang Kaya Baru	Tika

=== Music video appearances ===
Year	Title	Artist(s)	Ref.
2011	"Terlalu Mendamba"	Supernova	
2011	"Berhenti di Kamu"	Anji	
2013	"Burn"	Iskandar Widjaja	
2015	"Aku Tahu"	Ungu	
2015	"All About Love"	Andre Hehanussa	
2017	"Jadi Milikku"	Marcell Siahaan	
2019	"Ready for Love"	Vidi Aldiano	

=== Commercial ===
- Ponds
- Pantene
- Wardah
- Top White Coffee
- XL
- Hemaviton
- Oppo

== Discography ==
Single
Year	Title	Notes
2015	"Kekasih di Surga"	OST Surga Yang Tak Dirindukan
2017	"Jadi Milikku"	Duet with Marcell
2019	"Ready for Love"	Duet with Vidi Aldiano & A. Nayaka - Nominated for "Best Soul/R&B Collaboration" at 2020 Anugerah Musik Indonesia

== Awards and nominations ==
Year	Award	Category	Work	Result
2014	Bandung Film Festival	Citra Award for Best Leading Actor	Susi Susanti: Love All	Nominated
2015	Bandung Film Festival	Best Supporting Actress	Surga yang Tak Dirindukan	Won
2015	Indonesian Film Festival	Citra Award for Best Supporting Actress	Surga yang Tak Dirindukan	Nominated
2016	Indonesian Box Office Movie Awards	Best Supporting Actress	Surga yang Tak Dirindukan	Won
2018	Indonesian Box Office Movie Awards	Best Supporting Actress	Surga yang Tak Dirindukan 2	Nominated
2018	Indonesian Box Office Movie Awards	Best Talent Ensemble (with Fedi Nuril, Laudya Cynthia Bella, and Reza Rahadian)	Surga yang Tak Dirindukan 2	Nominated
