= Surga Yang Tak Dirindukan =

- Poster film
- Directed by: Kuntz Agus
- Produced by: Manoj Punjabi
- Starring: Fedi Nuril; Laudya Cynthia Bella; Raline Shah
- Cinematography: Rahmat Syaiful
- Edited by: Cesa David Luckmansyah
- Music by: Krisna Purna; Tya Subiakto Satrio
- Production company: MD Pictures
- Release date: 15 July 2015
- Running time: 124 minutes
- Country: Indonesia
- Language: Indonesian
- Box office: Rp53 billion (US$3.8 million)

Surga Yang Tak Dirindukan is a 2015 Indonesian drama film directed by Kuntz Agus and produced by Manoj Punjabi.The film starred by Fedi Nuril, Laudya Cynthia Bella, and Raline Shah with Kemal Pahlevi, Tanta Ginting, Landung Simatupang, and Zaskia Adya Mecca in supporting roles. The film based on the bestselling namesake novel by Asma Nadia, which itself is based on a true story. The film was released on 15 July 2015.

The film received many nominations in other ceremony awards: "Best Film" at the 2015 Indonesian Film Festival, "Favorite Film" at the 2016 Indonesian Movie Actor Awards, "Movie of the Year" at the 2016 Indonesian Choice Awards, "Best Film Poster", "Best Film Trailer", and "Best Behind the Scene" at the 2016 Indonesian Box Office Movie Awards. And also the film only three receiving awards in the other awards: "Most Celeb Indonesian Film" award at the 2015 Selebrita Awards, "Best Film" award and "Grossing Film" award at the 2016 Indonesian Box Office Movie Awards. A sequel was released in 2017.

== Plot ==
Arini and Prasetya are married and have a child, Nadia. However, their lives takes a turn when Prasetya marries Mei Rose.

== Cast ==
- Fedi Nuril as Andhika Prasetya
- Laudya Cynthia Bella as Citra Arini
- Raline Shah as Mei Rose
- Kemal Pahlevi as Amran
- Tanta Ginting as Hartono
- Zaskia Adya Mecca as Sita
- Landung Simatupang as Sutejo
- Ray Sitoresmi as Sulasti
- Sandrinna Michelle as Nadia
- Vitta Mariana as Lia

== Production ==
Raline Shah declined the role of Mei Rose, a homewrecker, three times but finally accepted due to the persistence of the producer.

== Themes and influences ==
The film depicts the new Indonesian Muslim middle class that is modern and not strict in adhering to Islamic customs.

== Reception ==
A critic from Fimela wrote, "the packaging of Surga yang Tak Dirindukan is superior to most dramas. The sound and visual effects are brought to life, making the audience feel like they're immersed in the story [sic]".

While reviewing the second film, Syahirah Mokhtazar of the New Straits Times wrote, "THE heart-wrenching Indonesian movie Surga Yang Tak Dirindukan portrayed many life lessons. Director Kuntz Agus did a good job".

== Awards and nominations ==
Year	Awards	Category	Recipients	Result
2015	Festival Film Bandung	Best Film	Surga Yang Tak Dirndukan	Nominated
2015	Festival Film Bandung	Best Female Leading Role	Laudya Cynthia Bella	Won
2015	Festival Film Bandung	Best Female Supporting Role	Raline Shah	Won
2015	Festival Film Bandung	Best Arranger	Tya Subiakto Satrio & Krisna Purna Ratmana	Nominated
2015	Festival Film Bandung	Best Camera System	Ipung Rachmat Syaiful	Nominated
2015	Festival Film Bandung	Best Editing	Cesa David Luckmansyah	Nominated
2015	Selebrita Awards	Most Celeb Indonesian Film	Surga Yang Tak Dirindukan	Won
2015	Anugerah Musik Indonesia	Best Original Soundtrack Film Production Work	Krisdayanti – "Surga Yang Tak Drindukan" (Surga Yang Tak Drindukan)	Nominated
2015	Indonesian Film Festival	Best Adaptation Screenwriter	Alim Sudio	Nominated
2015	Indonesian Film Festival	Best Supporting Actress	Raline Shah	Nominated
2015	Maya Awards	Best Actress in a Leading Role	Laudya Cynthia Bella	Nominated
2016	Indonesian Box Office Movie Awards	Best Film	Surga Yang Tak Dirindukan	Won
2016	Indonesian Box Office Movie Awards	Best Male Leading Role	Fedi Nuril	Won
2016	Indonesian Box Office Movie Awards	Best Female Leading Role	Laudya Cynthia Bella	Won
2016	Indonesian Box Office Movie Awards	Best Female Supporting Role	Raline Shah	Won
2016	Indonesian Box Office Movie Awards	Best Male Supporting Role	Tanta Ginting	Nominated
2016	Indonesian Box Office Movie Awards	Best Director	Kuntz Agus	Nominated
2016	Indonesian Box Office Movie Awards	Best Screenwriter	Alim Sudio	Nominated
2016	Indonesian Box Office Movie Awards	Best Film Poster	Surga Yang Tak Dirindukan	Nominated
2016	Indonesian Box Office Movie Awards	Best Film Trailer	Surga Yang Tak Dirindukan	Nominated
2016	Indonesian Box Office Movie Awards	Best Behind the Scene	Surga Yang Tak Dirindukan	Nominated
2016	Indonesian Box Office Movie Awards	Best Film Original Soundtrack	Krisdayanti – "Surga Yang Tak Dirindukan" (Surga Yang Tak Dirindukan)	Won
2016	Indonesian Box Office Movie Awards	Best Ensemble Talent	Fedi Nuril, Laudya Cynthia Bella, Raline Shah	Nominated
2016	Indonesian Box Office Movie Awards	Grossing Film	Surga Yang Tak Dirindukan	Won
2016	Indonesian Movie Actor Awards	Best Children Role	Sandrinna Michelle	Nominated
2016	Indonesian Movie Actor Awards	Favorite Film	Surga Yang Tak Dirindukan	Nominated
2016	Indonesian Choice Awards	Movie of the Year	Surga Yang Tak Dirindukan	Nominated
