= Gola Gong =

Indonesian novelist

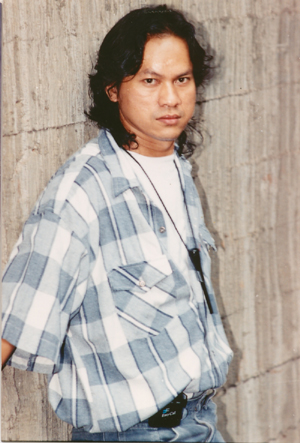
- Gola Gong
- Born: Heri Hendrayana Harris; 15 August 1963 (age 63); Purwakarta, West Java, Indonesia
- Occupations: Novelist, Television scriptwriter
- Spouse: Tias Tatanka (m. 1996)
- Children: 2 daughters, 2 son
- Writing career
- Genre: Fiction
- Notable works: The Ballad of Roy, Kepada-Mu Aku Bersimpuh
- Website: www.golagong.com

Heri Hendrayana Harris (born August 15, 1963), pen name Gola Gong, is an Indonesian novelist. His pen name, Gola Gong mean "gol" or "goal" is an expression of gratitude from his father when his series of novels entitled The Ballad of Roy published by HAI Magazine. Then the "Gong" is the hope of his mother, so that writing can be echoed to the sound of gong musical instrument. The letter "a" which means "all come from Allah". Thus, the meaning of the name "Gol A Gong" interpreted as "success all comes from God (Allah)".

== Early life ==
Gola Gong was born in Purwakarta, West Java, Indonesia from mother named Atisah and father named Harris. At the age of 11 years, Gol A Gong (first written Gola Gong) lost his left hand. It happened when he and his friends playing in the plaza near Serang City. At that time there were soldiers parachuting exercise. To his friends he was challenged to a penalty of courage as a paratrooper. Nerve test was done by jumping from a tree at the edge of the square. Who would dare to jump the highest, he is entitled to become a leader among them. Accident that caused his left hand amputated it does not make him sad. His father confirmed to him: "You must read and you will become someone and you forget that the self is flawed".

== Career ==
Gola Gong writes poetry, hundreds of short stories, 120 novels, hundreds of essays, and the TV scenario. He was famous for his novel The Ballad of Roy (Balada Si Roy). In addition to writing the novel he also writing another novel of more than 125 titles. Worked as a journalist on HAI magazine (1989–1990), writer on the TV scenario Indosiar (1995), senior creative at RCTI TV (1996–2008) and assistant manager at Bantam TV.

== Philanthropy ==
Since 2001 he founded "The World House" art community in Serang, Banten. The World at Home (Rumah Dunia) spread the virus "Earthquake Literacy", which destroys ignorance cultural movement through the word (literary and journalistic), voice (music), arts (theater and film), and color (paint). "Earthquake" activity in the form of literacy: (1) Oration literacy, (2) Training, (3) Grant books, (4) Various competitions literacy, (5) Publishing, (6) Book review/book release, and (7) Bazaar cheap books. This community is located on 3000 square meters of land behind his home in Complex Hegar Alam, Ciloang, Serang City, Bantam, about 90 kilometers west of Jakarta. This is a community learning center of journalism, literature, film, painting, and theater. All people who come to the House of World without charge. He founded the Home of the world with Tias Tatanka (his wife), and two of his friends; Toto ST Radik, and (late) Rys Revolta.

== Publications ==
- Balada Si Roy (1989)
- Kupu-Kupu Pelangi (1992)
- Kepada-Mu Aku Bersimpuh (1999)
- Biarkan Aku Jadi Milik-Mu (2001)
- Lewat Tengah Malam (2003, adapted to film on 2007)

== Awards ==
1. Islamic Book Fair Award 2005
2. Nugraha Jasadarma Pustaloka (National Library 2007)
3. XL Indonesia Achievement Award 2008
4. Literacy Award in 2009 (Community Literacy Indonesia)
5. National Literacy Prize (Ministry of National Education, 2010)
6. Elshinta Radio Award (2010)
7. Literacy figures Mover (IKAPI - Association of Indonesian Publishers, 2011)

== Personal life ==
At the age of 33 years (1996) Gola Gong married Tias Tatanka, the girl from Solo, Central Java. From this marriage they had two daughters named Nabila (14) and Natasha (8), two boys named Gabriel (13) and Jordy (9). Nabila current junior class 3 civilization, in Serang city, has written nine novels. While Gabriel loved drawing and made his short film.
