= Laudya Cynthia Bella =

Indonesian singer and actress

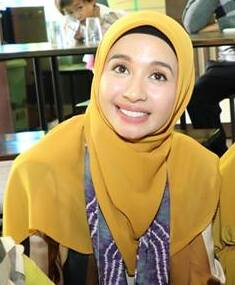
- Born: Laudya Cynthia Bella; 24 February 1988 (age 38); Bandung, West Java, Indonesia
- Occupations: Celebrity, singer, model
- Years active: 2002–present
- Musical career
- Genres: Pop; Dance
- Instrument: Vocals
- Label: Aquarius Musikindo

Laudya Cynthia Bella (born 24 February 1988, in Bandung, West Java, Indonesia) is an Indonesian singer and actress.

== Personal life ==
Bella married for the second time to Malaysian media strategist, Engku Emran Engku Zainal Abidin in Kuala Lumpur, Malaysia, on 8 September 2017. Engku Emran was previously married to Malaysian actress Erra Fazira from 2007 to 2014. They divorced in June 2020.

== Career ==
Bella worked as a model before moving to the acting career. She was selected as a Kawanku magazine finalist in 2002. She played the character Biyan in the film Virgin (2004), for which she was nominated for Best Leading Actress at the 2005 Indonesian Film Festival and won "Best Female Leading Role" award at the 2005 Festival Film Bandung.

Bella joined Melly Goeslaw's vocal group BBB (stands for Bukan Bintang Biasa), together with Raffi Ahmad, Chelsea Olivia Wijaya, Dimas Beck, and Ayushita in 2006. In addition, BBB appears in the 2006 drama-themed film Bukan Bintang Biasa, directed by Lasja Fauzia. The same same year, Bella appeared in a cameo role in the film Berbagi Suami and played as Risa Apriliyanti in the horror movie Lentera Merah.

She also starred in the soap opera Jurangan Jengkol, for which she earned a trophy in the "Famous Actress" category at the 2006 SCTV Awards. In addition, she has appeared in several soap opera television and advertisement. In 2011, Bella has played for film which had coincide in Lebaran, titled Di Bawah Lindungan Ka'bah, for which she won "Best Leading Actress" award at the 2012 e-Guardians Awards and was nominated for "Best Female Leading Role" at the 2012 Festival Film Bandung.

In 2013, Bella starred a thriller-horror movie, Belenggu, for which she won the "Favorite Actress" award at the 2013 Indonesian Movie Awards. She was nominated for Best Leading Actress at the 2013 Indonesian Film Festival and nominated for "Best Actress" at the 2013 Indonesian Movie Awards.

In 2014, Bella starred in the drama Haji Backpacker. This movie follows the main character as she travels to Mecca for the Hajj. It was shot in nine countries: Indonesia, Thailand, Vietnam, China, India, Tibet, Nepal, Iran, and Saudi Arabia. She received a nomination for "Most Riveting Role" at the 2014 Maya Awards.

== Discography ==
=== Soundtrack album ===
- Ost. Bukan Bintang Biasa (2007)

=== Singles ===
Year	Title	Album	Label
2007	"Let's Dance Together" (with BBB & Melly Goeslaw)	Mindnsoul	Aquarius Musikindo
2007	"Karena Cinta" (with BBB)	Ost. Bukan Bintang Biasa	Aquarius Musikindo
2008	"Putus Nyambung" (with BBB)	Non-album single	Aquarius Musikindo
2009	"Jodoh Ditangan Tuhan" (feat. Raffi Ahmad)	Non-album single	Aquarius Musikindo
2010	"Kuingin Menikah" (with BBB Girls)	Ost. Kabayan Jadi Milyuner	Aquarius Musikindo
2012	"CH2 (Cinta Hati Hati)" (with BBB & Melly Goeslaw)	Balance	Aquarius Musikindo
2015	"Best Friends Forever" (with BBB	Non-album single	Aquarius Musikindo
2016	"Surga Yang Kurindukan" (with: Wafda)	Ost. Surga Yang Tak Dirindukan 2	MD Music

=== Video clip ===
Year	Title	Artist
2001	"Salam Bagi Sahabat"	Glenn Fredly
2002	"Samudera Mengering"	Jikustik
2004	"Inginku Bukan Hanya Jadi Temanmu"	Yovie & Nuno
2008	"Sempurna"	Gita Gutawa
2010	"Jangan Ada Dusta Diantara Kita"	Angkasa

== Filmography ==
=== Film ===
Year	Title	Role	Notes
2004	Virgin	Biyan	Lead role Nominated – 2005 Indonesian Film Festival for Best Leading Actress; Won – 2005 Festival Film Bandung for Best Female Leading Role; Won – 2005 MTV Indonesia Movie Awards for Most Rising Star
2006	Berbagi Suami	The fourth wife	Cameo
2006	Lentera Merah	Risa Apriliyanti	Lead role
2007	Bukan Bintang Biasa	Bella	Lead role
2008	Love	Dinda	lead role
2008	Kuntilanak 3	Stella	Cameo
2009	Suka Ma Suka	Bella	Lead role
2010	Gadis di Ruang Tunggu	Hana	Short film
2011	Cowok Bikin Pusing	Tasha	Lead role
2011	Di Bawah Lindungan Ka'bah	Zainab	Lead role Nominated – 2012 Festival Film Bandung for Best Female Leading Role; Won – 2012 Guardians e-Awards for Best Leading Role Actress
2013	Belenggu	Djenar	Lead role Nominated – 2013 Indonesian Film Festival for Best Leading Actress; Nominated – 2013 Indonesian Movie Awards for Best Actress; Won – 2013 Indonesian Movie Awards for Favorite Actress
2014	Haji Backpacker	Marbel	Supporting role Nominated – 2014 Maya Awards for Most Riveting Role
2014	Tak Kemal Maka Tak Sayang	Putri	Lead role
2014	Assalamualaikum Beijing	Sekar	Lead role Won – 2015 I-Cinema Awards for Best Supporting Actress
2015	Kakak	Kirana	Lead role Won – 2015 I-Cinema Awards for Best Leading Actress
2015	Surga Yang Tak Dirindukan	Citra Arini	Lead role Won – 2015 Festival Film Bandung for Best Female Leading Role; Nominated – 2015 Maya Awards for Best Actress in a Leading Role; Won – 2015 I-Cinema Awards for Favorite Leading Actress; Won – 2015 I-Cinema Awards for Favorite Chemistry (with Fedi Nuril); Nominated – 2015 I-Cinema Awards for Best Leading Actress; Won – 2016 Indonesian Box Office Movie Awards for Best Female Leading Role
2015	Talak 3	Risa	Lead role Won – 2016 I-Cinema Awards for Favorite Leading Actress; Won – 2016 I-Cinema Awards for Favorite Chemistry (with Vino G. Bastian)
2016	Aisyah: Biarkan Kami Bersaudara	Aisyah	Lead role Nominated – 2016 Festival Film Bandung for Best Female Leading Role; Nominated – 2016 I-Cinema Awards for Best Leading Actress; Nominated – 2016 Maya Awards for Best Actress in a Leading Role; Won – 2017 Indonesian Movie Actor Awards for Favorite Actress; Nominated – 2017 Indonesian Movie Actor Awards for Best Actress
2016	Surga Yang Tak Dirindukan 2	Citra Arini	Lead role
2019	Ambu	Fatma	Lead Role
2023	Buya Hamka Vol. 1	Sitti Raham	Lead role

=== Television ===
Year	Title	Role	Notes	Network
2003–2004	Senandung Masa Puber	Sofi	Lead role	Trans TV
2004	Cerita Si Angel		Supporting role	RCTI
2004	Cuek Tapi Cinta			
2004–2005	Kisah Sedih di Hari Minggu	Asti	Supporting role	RCTI
2005	Pacarku Superstar		Lead role	Trans 7
2005	Akulah Arjuna		Supporting role	RCTI
2005	The Pakis			
2005	The Pakis 2			
2005	Virgin the Series	Biyan	Lead role	ANTV
2006	Jurangan Jengkol	Ifa	Lead role Won – 2006 SCTV Awards for Famous Actress	SCTV
2006	Extravaganza ABG	Herself	Comedy variety show	Trans TV
2006–2007	Pengen Jadi Bintang	Bella	Lead role	SCTV
2006–2007	Cinta Remaja	Kezia	Lead role	SCTV
2007	Romantika Remaja	Bella	Lead role	SCTV
2007	Legenda	Alya/Bawang Putih	Episode: "Bawang Merah Bawang Putih"	Trans TV
2007	Bunga	Bunga	Lead role	SCTV
2007	Insert	Herself	Infotainment show	Trans TV
2007–2008	Cinta Bunga	Bunga	Lead role	SCTV
2008	Tasbih Cinta	Bella	Lead role	Indosiar
2009	Cinta Bunga 2	Bunga	Lead role	SCTV
2009	Amira	Amira	Lead role	Indosiar
2009	Cinta Nia	Laudya	Supporting role	SCTV
2009–2010	Kesetiaan Cinta	Karin Firmansyah	Lead role	SCTV
2010	Saatnya Kita Sahur	Herself	Ramadhan comedy variety show	Trans TV
2011	Kesucian Cinta	Nabila	Lead role	MNCTV
2012	Ngabuburit Season 1	Herself	Comedy variety show	Trans TV
2012	Putri Nabila	Putri	Lead role	MNCTV
2012	Tobat Sambel	Gadis	Lead role	MNCTV
2013	Gang Senggol	Aisah	Lead role	MNCTV
2013–2014	Ken Arok & Ken Dedes	Ken Dedes	Lead role	MNCTV
2014	Yang Penting Halal	Jelita	Lead role	MNCTV
2014	Pesbukers	Herself	Comedy variety show	ANTV
2014	Sahurnya Ramadhan	Herself	Ramadhan comedy variety show	Trans TV
2014	Ngabuburit Season 2	Herself	Comedy variety show	Trans TV
2015	BBB Story	Herself	Variety Show	Trans TV
2015—2017	Sunsilk Hijab Hunt	(2015: as Host) (2016–2017: as Judges)	Talent Show	Trans 7
2015—2017	Diary Laudya Cynthia Bella	Herself	Travelling Show	Trans TV
2016	D'Hijabers	Kantini	Lead Role	SCTV
2017	Kantini D'hijabers	Kantini	Lead Role	MNC TV
2017	Ceria i-Star	Judges	Kid's Talent Show	Astro Malaysia

=== Film Television ===
Year	Title	Role	Notes
2005	Jurangan Jengkol	Ifa	Lead role
2005	Kalau Jodoh Takkan Lari	Intan	Lead role
2011	Api Cinta	Lila	Lead role
2011	Mohon Jaga Hatiku		Lead role
2013	Cinta Lampau Bikin Galau		Lead role
2013	Putu Mayang Cinta	Mayang Putri	Lead role
2014	Mr. Gunung Cintaku	Sisil	Lead role
2014	Princess Teh Talua	Adia	Lead role
2014	Tasbih Pembawa Cinta	Maya	Lead role
2015	Bidadari Pelindung Cinta		Lead role
2017	Insyaallah Jodoh	Syanin	Lead Role

=== Musical Drama ===
Year	Title	Role
2006	Pangeran Katak & Puteri Impian	Princess dream
2012	Musikal Lutung Kasarung	Angel heaven

== TV Commercial ==
Year	Brands	Notes
2005	La Tulipe	Contract limit time: (2005–2006)
2008	XL	
2008	IM3	
2008	Carvil	Contract limit time: (2008–2009)
2008	Sophie Paris	Contract Limit Time: (2008–2013)
2010	Garnier	Contract limit time: (2010–2014)
2012	SimPATI	Contract limit time: (2012–2013)
2013	Dulcolax	Contract limit time: (2013–2015)
2015	Citra	Contract limit time: (2015-now)
2015	Sunsilk	Contract limit time: (2015-now)
2015	Zoya	
2016	Luwak White Koffie	
2016	HijUp	Contract limit time: (2016–2017)
2016	Madu TJ	Contract limit time: (2016–2017)
2017	Mixagrip	Contract limit time: (2017-now)
2018	Downy Indonesia	

== Awards and nominations ==
Year	Awards	Category	Recipients	Results
2005	Indonesian Film Festival	Citra Award for Best Leading Actress	Virgin	Nominated
2005	Festival Film Bandung	Best Female Leading Role	Virgin	Won
2005	MTV Indonesia Movie Awards	Most Rising Star	Virgin	Won
2006	SCTV Awards	Most Famous Actress	Jurangan Jengkol	Won
2006	ParFi Awards	Favorite Younger Actress Film	Laudya Cynthia Bella	Won
2008	Johnny Andrean Awards	Best Hair Do for Actress	Laudya Cynthia Bella	Won
2008	SCTV Awards	Most Famous Actress	Cinta Bunga	Nominated
2009	SCTV Awards	Most Famous Actress	Cinta Bunga	Nominated
2010	Insert! Awards	Sexiest Female Celebrity of The Year	Laudya Cynthia Bella	Won
2010	SCTV Awards	Most Famous Actress	Kesetiaan Cinta	Nominated
2012	Festival Film Bandung	Best Female Leading Role	Di Bawah Lindungan Ka'bah	Nominated
2012	Guardians e-Awards	Best Leading Role Actress	Di Bawah Lindungan Ka'bah	Won
2013	Indonesian Film Festival	Citra Award for Best Leading Actress	Belenggu	Nominated
2013	Indonesian Movie Awards	Best Actress	Belenggu	Nominated
2013	Indonesian Movie Awards	Favorite Actress	Belenggu	Won
2013	Yahoo! OMG Awards	Favorite Couple	Laudya Cynthia Bella & Chicco Jerikho	Nominated
2014	Maya Awards	Most Riveting Role	Haji Backpacker	Nominated
2014	Yahoo! Celebrity Awards	Most Shocking Break Up	Laudya Cynthia Bella & Chicco Jerikho	Nominated
2015	Indonesian Choice Awards	Actress of the Year	Laudya Cynthia Bella	Nominated
2015	Festival Film Bandung	Best Female Leading Role	Surga Yang Tak Dirindukan	Won
2015	Selebrita Awards	Most Celeb Hijaber	Laudya Cynthia Bella	Won
2015	Silet Awards	Razored Hits Maker	Laudya Cynthia Bella	Nominated
2015	Maya Awards	Best Actress in a Leading Role	Surga Yang Tak Dirindukan	Nominated
2015	i-Cinema Awards	Best Actress in a Leading Role	Surga Yang Tak Dirindukan	Nominated
2015	i-Cinema Awards	Best Actress in a Leading Role	Kakak	Won
2015	i-Cinema Awards	Favorite Actress	Surga Yang Tak Dirindukan	Won
2016	Infotainment Awards	Most Fashionable Hijaber Celebrity	Laudya Cynthia Bella	Nominated
2016	Indonesian Box Office Movie Awards	Best Female Leading Role	Surga Yang Tak Dirindukan	Won
2016	Pop Awards	Best Friend Pop Awards	Laudya Cynthia Bella & Dimas Beck	Nominated
2016	Pop Awards	Female Pop Awards	Laudya Cynthia Bella	Nominated
2016	Socmed Awards	Celeb Gram Hijaber	Laudya Cynthia Bella	Nominated
2016	Indonesian Choice Awards	Actress of the Year	Laudya Cynthia Bella	Nominated
2016	Festival Film Bandung	Best Female Leading Role	Aisyah: Biarkan Kami Bersaudara	Nominated
2016	Selebrita Awards	Most Celeb Movie Star	Laudya Cynthia Bella	Nominated
2016	Indonesian Social Media Awards	Female Celeb Instagram	Laudya Cynthia Bella	Won
2016	Maya Awards	Best Actress in a Leading Role	Aisyah: Biarkan Kami Bersaudara	Nominated
2016	i-Cinema Awards	Most Favorite Actress	Talak 3	Won
2017	Infotainment Awards	Most Fashionable Hijaber Celebrity	Laudya Cynthia Bella	Nominated
2017	Seleb On News Awards	Most Charm Celeb	Laudya Cynthia Bella	Nominated
2017	Seleb On News Awards	Most Social Media Celeb	Laudya Cynthia Bella	Nominated
2017	Seleb On News Awards	Most Beautiful Hijaber Celeb	Laudya Cynthia Bella	Won
2017	JawaPos.com Reader's Choice Awards	Favorite Actress	Laudya Cynthia Bella	Nominated
2017	Indonesian Movie Actor Awards	Best Actress	Aisyah: Biarkan Kami Bersaudara	Nominated
2017	Indonesian Movie Actor Awards	Favorite Actress	Aisyah: Biarkan Kami Bersaudara	Won
2017	Indonesian Choice Awards	Actress of the Year	Laudya Cynthia Bella	Nominated
2017	Usmar Ismail Awards	Best Actress in a Leading Role	Aisyah: Biarkan Kami Bersaudara	Nominated
2018	Indonesian Box Office Movie Awards	Best Actress in a Leading Role	Surga Yang Tak Dirindukan 2	Nominated
2019	Indonesian Film Festival	Citra Award for Best Supporting Actress	Ambu	Nominated
