= Ummi (magazine) =

Indonesian Islamic women's magazine

- Cover, February 2016
- Frequency: Monthly
- Circulation: 80,000–100,000 (2002)
- Publisher: Ummi Group
- First issue: April 1989; 37 years ago
- Final issue: January 2018; 8 years ago
- Country: Indonesia
- Based in: Jakarta
- Language: Indonesian
- ISSN: 2527-8983

Ummi was an Indonesian Islamic women's magazine published from 1989. Established during a rapprochement between the New Order regime of President Suharto and Indonesia's Muslims, the magazine was initially distributed in a stencilled form during prayer groups. Over time, as it gained popularity, the magazine was registered with the Indonesian government and adopted a more popular format. In 2002, Ummi had a circulation of between 80,000 and 100,000 copies, making it one of Indonesia's most popular magazines. In the 2010s, readership declined, and Ummi focused more on online content. The magazine was used extensively for dakwah (proselytization), with its messaging directed primarily at urban Muslim women.

== History ==
Ummi was first published in April 1989 by PT Kimus. Assembled by three people, with 500 copies printed, the new magazine derived its title from the Arabic word for "mother" (أم ʾummi, genitive form, ie. "mother's"). The first issues were underground stencil prints distributed during prayer gatherings, mostly in Jakarta, Bandung, and Yogyakarta. At the time, the New Order regime was creating new spaces for public Islam after previously emphasizing a more secular and westernized identity. Early Islamic women's magazines established under the regime included Amanah and Sabili.

In its first two years of publication, Ummi was 36 pages in length. Beginning in 1991, Ummi received wider distribution. The magazine took the slogan Identitas Wanita Muslim (the Identity of Muslim Women). It was published on a monthly basis, with distribution reaching across the Indonesian Archipelago. In 1993, the Ummi Group acquired the women's magazine Annida, which was reoriented to focus on teenage audiences.

Ummi was redesigned in 1997; facing reader criticism over its focus on individual women models, the magazine implemented a policy to avoid close-ups and present women with their families. This coincided with a shift in management, with the predominantly male editorial board replaced by one that consisted mostly of women. The magazine received its press publication permit on 25 September 1998. Speaking in 2016, PT Insan Media Pratama director Dwi Septiawati Djafar recalled that the magazine had lacked the financial resources necessary to apply for a permit, which resulted in it spending its first nine years without one.

By 2002, Ummi was being published by PT Insan Media Pratama, and had reached circulations of 80,000 to 100,000 copies per edition, making it one of Indonesia's most popular magazines. At the time, it was one of numerous Islamic magazines published in Indonesia, with other titles including Kiblat, Amanah, and Aku Anak Shaleh. In 2003, Ummi took a more popular approach, incorporating advertisements and information on leisure activities while also providing space for reader responses. As with several other Islamic magazines, it was affiliated with the Prosperous Justice Party.

Ummi established an online edition in 2014; it estimated that circulation of the print edition had dropped to 35,000 to 50,000 copies per month. It also began using social media to distribute parenting information. A 2015 survey by AC Nielsen Research Indonesia found Ummi to have 300,000 readers, concentrated in major urban centres such as Jakarta, Bandung, Surabaya, Medan, and Makassar. Most readers were part of Indonesia's middle-class and between the ages of 31 and 49. Almost all readers, 96 per cent, were women.

== Format and contents ==
The first editions of Ummi were black-and-white and used clippings from other magazines for illustrations. Later editions included colour. The magazine measured 24.5 by 17 centimetres (9.6 in × 6.7 in).

Columns in Ummi tended to use romanized Arabic titles, with examples including "Tafakur" ("Reflection"), "Qurrata A'yun" ("Coolness of the Eyes"), and "Shihah" ("Health"). Contents varied, but included stories on Islamic jurisprudence, Qur'anic studies, family health, jewellery, beauty, and food. The magazine also included space for short fiction. An insert included material for children, including introductions to Islamic thought as well as skill development and short fiction.

Ummi was used as a form of dakwah (proselytization), promoting Islamic living to readers. Analysing the contents of three 2014 editions, Novi Maria Ulfah of Walisongo State Islamic University identified the magazine as citing several verses from the Qur'an, including Verse 31 of Surah An-Nur, and hadiths to remind women to cover their aurat (intimate parts); the same issue dealt with accepting sons' commitment to jihad, adhering to Islamic teachings, and maintaining a halal diet. Other columns presented contraception as mubah (permitted) due to a lack of explicit prohibitions, questioned the religiosity of soap operas with Islamic themes, and emphasized that iman (faith) was meant to be tested.

Diah Handayani of Kediri State Islamic Institute, exploring the political identity presented in Ummi, writes that the magazine was used by the Tarbiyah Movement to ensure the integration of women members. She writes that initial publications focused on narratives of practical piety as well as religious teachings, with women expected to remain in the domestic sphere. Several recommendations, such as urging women to have many children, ran contrary to government policies. She finds that, following the resignation of President Suharto, Ummi employed a more popular approach to dakwah, which coincided with more moderate understandings of Islam that better suited readers from outside the Tarbiyah movement.

== Works cited ==
- Ahmad (4 June 2014). "Tren Media Digital, Majalah Ummi Mengaku Tetap Dinanti" [Trends in Digital Media, Ummi Magazine Says Still Read]. Hidayatullah.com (in Indonesian).
- Handayani, Diah (2014). "Performatifitas Muslimah dalam Majalah Ummi" [Performativity of Muslim Womanhood in Ummi Magazine]. At-Tabsyir (in Indonesian). 2 (1): 73–98.
- Handayani, Diah (2021). "Political Identity, Popular Culture, and Ideological Coercion: The Discourses of Feminist Movement in the Report of Ummi Magazine". Jurnal Pemberdayaan Masyarakat: Media Pemikiran Dan Dakwah Pembangunan. 5 (1): 185–210. doi:10.14421/jpm.2021.051-08.
- Hasan, Noorhaidi (2009). "The Making of Public Islam: Piety, Agency, and Commodification on the Landscape of the Indonesian Public Sphere". Contemporary Islam. 3 (3): 229–250. doi:10.1007/s11562-009-0096-9.
- Irawanto, Budi (2010). "Riding Waves of Change: Islamic Press in Post-Authoritarian Indonesia". In Sen, Krishna; Hill, David (eds.). Politics and the Media in Twenty-First Century Indonesia: Decade of Democracy. London: Routledge. pp. 67–84. ISBN 978-1-136-89148-9.
- "Majalah Ummi" [Ummi Magazine] (in Indonesian). Jakarta: Indonesian Institute of Sciences. 2016. Archived from the original on 17 November 2020.
- Mansur, Puteri Soraya (2008). "Ummi: Identitas Wanita Islam" [Ummi: The Identity of Muslim Women]. In Setyowati, Hajar Nur (ed.). Seabad Pers Perempuan: Bahasa Ibu, Bahasa Bangsa [A Century of Women's Press: Mother Tongue, National Language] (in Indonesian). Yogyakarta: I:boekoe. pp. 266 –&#32, 268. ISBN 978-979-1436-08-3.
- Murdaningsih, Dwi (29 April 2016). "27 Tahun Eksis Berkiprah di Tengah Masa Krisis" [27 Years Serving Amidst Crises]. Republika (in Indonesian). Archived from the original on 19 March 2026.
- Setianto, Yearry Panji (2026). "Mediatization of Indonesian Islam: A Historical Examination of Media and Religious Change". Religions. 17 (2). doi:10.3390/rel17020170.
- Ulfah, Novia Maria (2016). "Dakwah Melalui Media Cetak (Analisis Isi Rubrik Mutara Islam Majalah Ummi)" [Dakwah Through Print Media: A Content Analysis of the Mutiara Islam Column in Ummi Magazine]. Islamic Communication Journal. 1 (1): 73–89. doi:10.21580/icj.2016.1.1.1247.
