= Helvy Tiana Rosa =

Indonesian playwright and writer (born 1970)

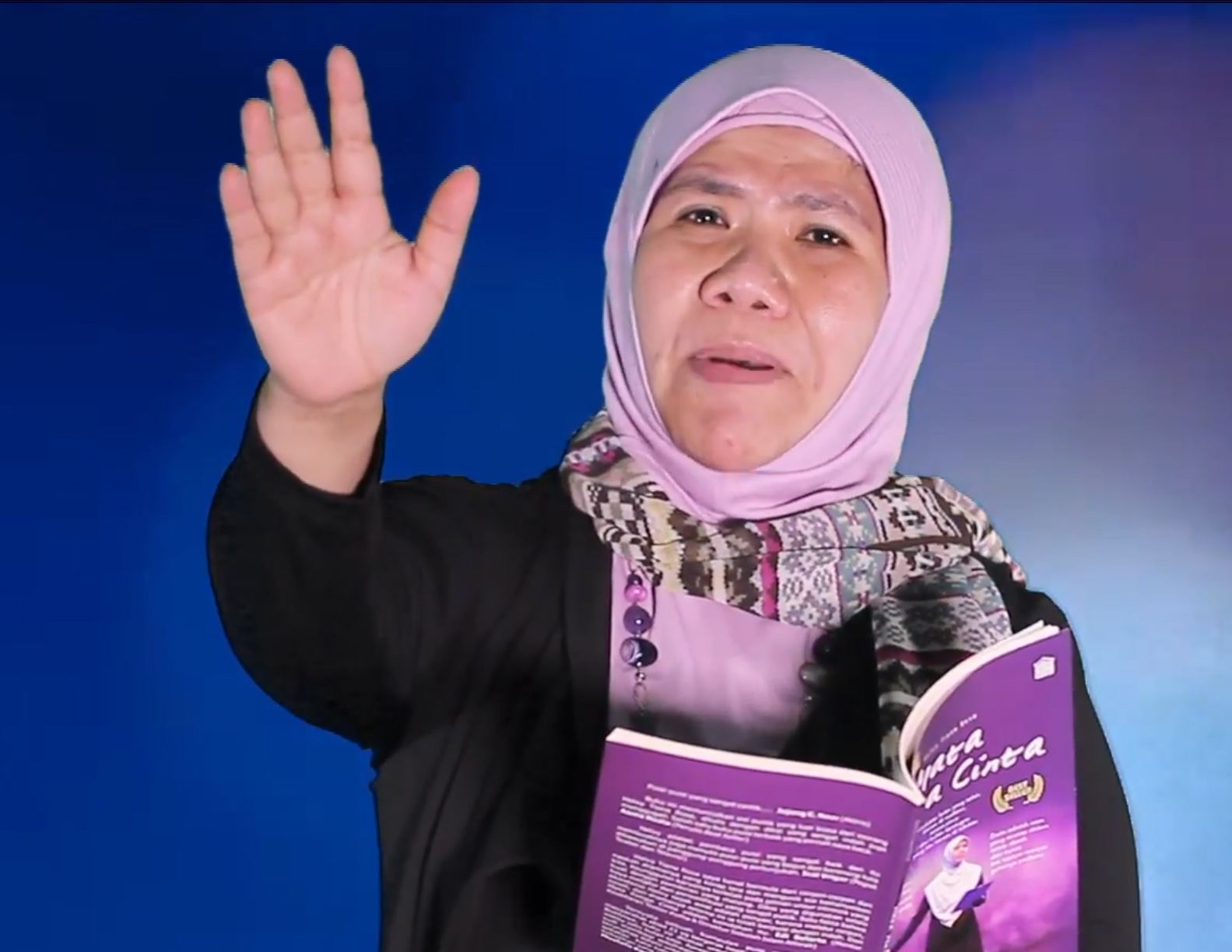
- Rosa reading her poem "Salam Negeriku", 2014
- Born: 2 April 1970 (age 56); Medan, Indonesia
- Occupations: writer and teacher
- Website: sastrahelvy.com

Helvy Tiana Rosa (born 2 April 1970) is an Indonesian playwright and writer. She is notable for founding and being the first chairwoman of the Forum Lingkar Pena ("Pen Circle Forum"), a well-known Indonesian literary forum.

The Royal Islamic Strategies Studies Centre, of the Royal Aal al-Bayt Institute for Islamic Thought, featured her in the 10th anniversary edition of The Muslim 500.

== Life ==
Rosa was born in Medan in 1970 but she moved to Jakarta where her younger sister Asma Nadia, who also became a writer, was born. She went to the Universitas Indonesia and gained a degree in Arabic literature. Whilst at university she wrote and directed her own plays. She has gained a master's degree. Rosa married Widanardi Satryatomo in 1995.

Her short story "The Red Nets" (Jaring-jaring Merah) was chosen as one of the most important of the 1990s by the influential magazine Horison. She has published over 50 works which have been translated into English, German, Arabic, Swedish, Japanese and French. She founded the website for young writers named Forum Lingkar Pena and she edited the magazine for Islamic teenagers known as Annida. She is known for taking a Muslim approach to her work. She writes of how woman live in an Islamic culture run by men. She writes against the permissive use of pornography.

Rosa has been included in a list of the 500 most influential Muslims.
