= Jemaah Tarbiyah =

Islamic religious movement in Indonesia

Jemaah Tarbiyah, also known as the Tarbiyah movement or the Dakwah movement, is an Islamic religious movement based in Indonesia. Jemaah Tarbiyah was an active movement during the 1980s to 1990s and consisted of university students, aimed at the religious education and da'wah (proselytizing). The movement is considered to be influenced by the teaching of Muslim Brotherhood. It is considered an important influence for Islamization of Indonesia. The movement became the bedrock of the Islamist party Prosperous Justice Party (PKS) which was founded in 2002.

== Etymology ==
The term tarbiyah (Arabic: تربية) means "intensive Islamic education" or "disciplining" in Arabic. Initially, the term was mainly used by outsiders to designate the particular phenomenon and activities conducted by certain groups. There has been no formal consensus on the naming by the activists of the movement. Tarbiyah is often used by Indonesian Islamic higher educational institutions as a name of faculties specialized in religious education. The term was also used by a socio-religious organization Islamic Education Union (Persatuan Tarbiyah Islam, PERTI) established in 1928. The usage of tarbiyah in the context of Jemaah Tarbiyah has no direct relations with any of the latter.

== History ==
There had been a history of da'wah based on university campuses, notably of elite secular universities such as Bandung Institute of Technology (ITB) since the 1970s. However, there was a demand for more comprehensive and systematic methods of da'wah, which was still very informal and strictly monitored by the Suharto regime. Some religious gatherings based in Salman Mosque of ITB is considered one of many origins of Jemaah Tarbiyah. These religious gatherings put particular emphasis on specific attitudes toward basic Islamic teachings and interpretations, including the principle of ukhuwah (brotherhood), dress code, and the prohibition on smoking.

Among the activists of Jemaah Tarbiyah, four Muslim students returned from the Islamic University of Madinah, Hilmi Aminuddin, Salim Segaf Aljufri, Abdullah Said Baharmus, and Acep Abdul Syukur, are considered founding fathers (collectively called muassis). Facing demands of more systematic proselytization and religious education, these four students and their cohorts have articulated a comprehensive program and organized activities, improved with methodology from the Middle East which was often named as usrah system. Its religious gatherings were known as halaqah which involved mentoring and Qur'anic recitations. Since early to mid-1980s, the activity had quickly spread across elite secular universities, where religious education was required to be complemented.

Jemaah Tarbiyah has often been pointed out of its Muslim Brotherhood influence. Usrah system was a training program of Muslim Brotherhood members, and the Tarbiyah movement had directly implemented the methodology. Activists of the Tarbiyah movement are also considered to be committed toward translation of books written by members of Muslim Brotherhood, including Hassan al-Banna and Sayyid Qutb. There is also an explanation that links Jemaah Tarbiyah to the Indonesian Islamic Dawaah Council (DDII), a conservative Islamic organization headed by Mohammad Natsir. DDII had contributed to the constructions of mosques in the universities and was central to the importation of religious teachings from the Middle East. Some of the prominent activists of Jemaah Tarbiyah had DDII backgrounds. (Note: Aay Mohammad Furkon mentions Bang Imad and Abu Ridha as important figures of the Tarbiyah movement with DDII background and connections with Mohammad Natsir.)

Throughout the 1980s, Jemaah Tarbiyah had managed to grow its influence underground, mostly due to its focus on religious issues and avoided political activism. The movement had also established formal institutions with similar aims but without explicit reference toward its connections. Such institutions include foundations like Nurul Fikri, Al-Hikmah Boarding School, and PA-HAM. In the 1990s, the movement had established influence over many intra-university student organizations and discussion forums. The movement accommodated various Islamic religious strands from traditionalist to modernists, and was fluid regarding pragmatic concerns such as political system.

After the fall of Suharto and the beginning of the democratic transition, activists of the movement founded an Islamist political party Justice Party (PK) in 1998, and its successor Prosperous Justice Party (PKS) in 2002. Majority of the members of PK and PKS, including the first president of PK Nurmahmudi Ismail, were activists of Jemaah Tarbiyah. The establishment of a political party was chosen over the establishment of a formal socio-religious organization. The decision was supported by the majority of the activists. Main activities related to da'wah conducted during the Jemaah Tarbiyah era were succeeded by the political parties. Today, activists of Jemaah Tarbiyah have been continuously influencing the creation of new trends in da'wah and Islamic socio-religious movements, including One Day One Juz (ODOJ).
