= Salman Aristo =

Indonesian film director and screenwriter

Salmon Aristo
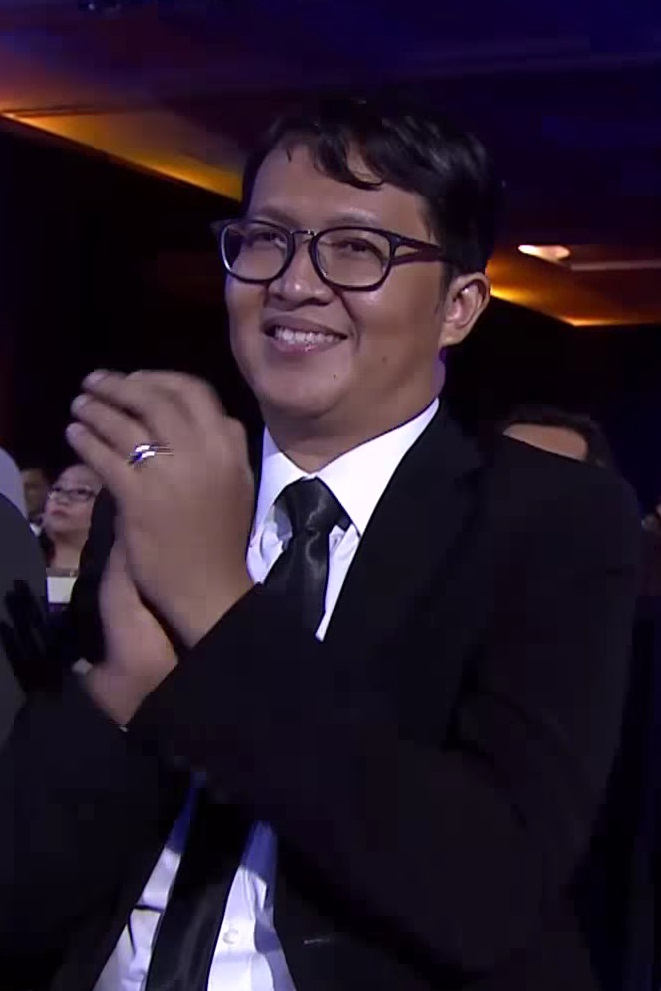
- Born: 1976 (age 49–50); Jakarta, Indonesia
- Education: Padjadjaran University
- Occupation: Screenwriter
- Years active: c. 2003 – present
- Notable work: Ayat-Ayat Cinta; Laskar Pelangi; Garuda di Dadaku; Sang Penari
- Spouse: Gina S. Noer

Salman Aristo (born 1976) is an Indonesian screenwriter and film director best known for his work on Ayat-Ayat Cinta, Laskar Pelangi, Garuda di Dadaku, and Sang Penari.

Born in Jakarta, Aristo became interested in films from a young age, though he did not consider a career in the industry until after graduating from university. At the suggestion of a friend, he wrote his first screenplay, Tak Pernah Kembali Sama. With feedback on the script from director Rudy Soedjarwo and after a period reading old, successful scripts, Aristo – at the time a film reviewer for a magazine – was able to befriend Hanung Bramantyo, who asked him to write a script about brownies. The resulting film, a critical success, led to Aristo receiving numerous requests for screenplays, including several adaptations of novels. In 2010, he released his directorial debut, Jakarta Maghrib.

Aristo, who is married to fellow screenwriter Gina S. Noer, is influenced by several Western and Indonesian screenwriters, including Woody Allen, Robert Altman, Richard Linklater, Richard Curtis, Arifin C. Noer, and Asrul Sani. He has been nominated for three Citra Awards for screenwriting, although he has yet to win.

== Biography ==
=== Early life and career ===
Aristo was born in Jakarta in 1976. As a child, he became interested in film when he and his family went to the movie theatre together; in an interview with Tabloid Nova, he recalled that one of the first films he saw was a comedy starring Warkop. After beginning junior high school in 1988, he began to go to the theatres to watch films on his own. Despite his enjoyment of film, he was initially active in an indie band.

After senior high school, Aristo studied journalism at Padjadjaran University in Bandung, from which he graduated in 1999. While in university, he stayed active in the indie music scene with his band Silentium. After graduation he worked in journalism for a while before drifting to filmmaking upon the suggestion of Dedi Rakswaradana, later guitarist for the band Naff. Several months later, after moving back to Jakarta Aristo's first screenplay, a 90-page work titled Tak Pernah Kembali Sama (Never Been the Same Again), was read by director Rudy Soedjarwo. Soedjarwo gave the film several critiques, which drove Aristo to improve his writing.

To do so, beginning in 2002 Aristo began regularly going to Usmar Ismail Film Documentation Center in Kuningan, Jakarta, to read screenplays. Among the works he read were several by Asrul Sani, which he found highly useful; he later recalled that the script for Kejarlah Daku Kau Kutangkap (Chase Me, I'll Catch You) was one of the best. In the meantime, he took a job as a film reviewer for a local music magazine, which gave him greater access to the industry.

=== Success and later career ===
At a seminar, Aristo met director Hanung Bramantyo and showed him one of his screenplays. Bramantyo, who liked what he saw, asked Aristo to write a screenplay for a new film he was working on with Leo Sutanto of SinemArt. The resulting work, written after intensive research into the production of brownies and titled after the snack, was released in 2004. It garnered a Citra Award for Best Director at the Indonesian Film Festival for Bramantyo and a nomination for best original screenplay for Aristo. While Brownies was in production, Aristo wrote four other screenplays, for Catatan Akhir Sekolah (Notes from the End of School), Cinta Silver (Silver Love), Jomblo (Single), and Alexandria. All of these were made into films between 2005 and 2006. After these successes, at the end of 2006 Bramantyo asked Aristo and his wife, screenwriter Gina S. Noer, to adapt the novel Ayat-Ayat Cinta (Verses of Love) by Habiburrahman El Shirazy, into a film. The resulting work, also entitled Ayat-Ayat Cinta, was highly successful. This was followed by Karma (2007), and Kambing Jantan: The Movie (2008).

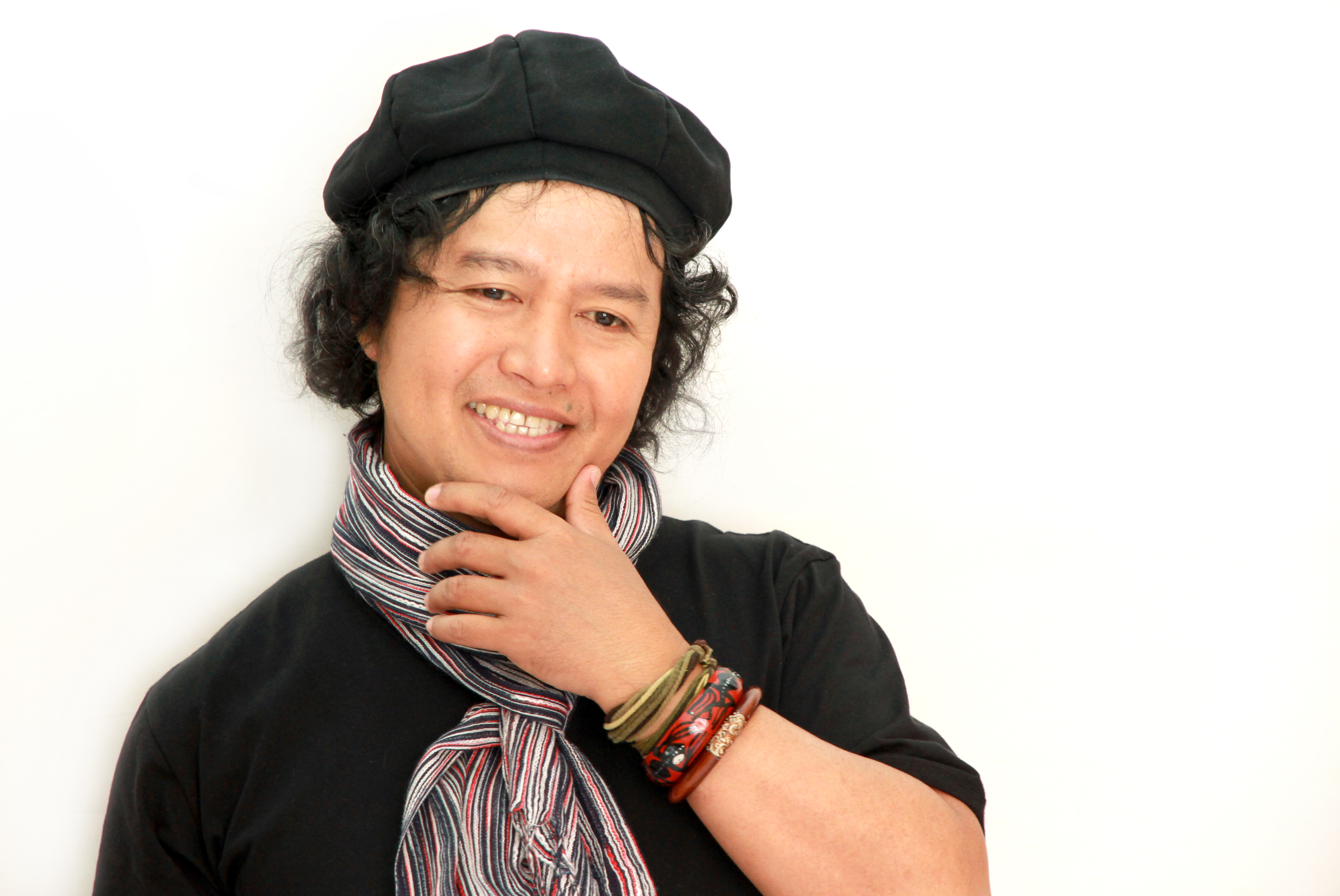
Aristo has adapted several works by Andrea Hirata (pictured), beginning with Laskar Pelangi in 2008.

In 2008, Aristo wrote a film adaptation of Andrea Hirata's 2005 novel Laskar Pelangi (Rainbow Troops) after being asked by the film's producer, Mira Lesmana. The film, directed by Riri Riza, was a critical and commercial success. He soon wrote another screenplay, for Garuda di Dadaku (Garuda on my Chest; 2009) upon request of producer Shanty Harmayn. The film, directed by Ifa Isfansyah, reportedly sold 1.2 million tickets, a large number for the Indonesian film industry.

Aristo joined Twitter in September 2009 as a way to promote his films. That year, his short film Pasangan Baru (New Partners) was screened at the Balinale Film Festival in Sanur, Bali. He also wrote Sang Pemimpi (The Dreamers), a film adaptation of the sequel to Laskar Pelangi. In 2010 he joined the online flash fiction Twitter community Fiksimini. His works, written in under 140 characters, were well received, and he soon became a moderator.

That same year, Aristo was a juror at the Asia Pacific Screen Awards, held in Gold Coast, Queensland, Australia. He also wrote the screenplay for Hari Untuk Amanda with Gina S. Noer (Days for Amanda), which earned a Citra Award nomination at the 2010 Indonesian Film Festival. He made his feature film directorial debut that year with Jakarta Maghrib (Jakarta at Maghrib), which details several families in the minutes before Maghrib prayers and how the call to prayer stops their daily activities. It premiered at the Jakarta International Film Festival.

In March 2011, Aristo published Politweet, an illustrated collection of flash fiction mostly dealing with politics. That same year, he cowrote the screenplay for Sang Penari (The Dancer) with Ifa Isfansyah and Shanty Harmayn; the work was an adaptation of Ahmad Tohari's trilogy Ronggeng Dukuh Paruk (The Ronggeng of Paruk Village). The trio were nominated for Best Screenplay at that year's Indonesian Film Festival. Later that year, he wrote Lima Elang (Five Eagles), a film directed by Rudy Soedjarwo. Focusing on five young children at camp, it was one of the first local films in decades to use Scouting as a central theme. Another film, Garuda di Dadaku 2 followed in December. As of 2011, he and Noer have two children.

Aristo wrote a television adaptation of Laskar Pelangi in late 2011. Directed by Guntur Soeharjanto, the series starred five youths from Bangka-Belitung and was shown in early 2012. Later in 2012, Aristo adapted Ahmad Fuadi's novel Negeri 5 Menara (The Land of Five Towers) into a film of the same name. Directed by Affandi Abdul Rachman, the film also featured Aristo as a producer.

== Influences ==
In an interview with The Jakarta Post, Aristo called Richard Curtis a large inspiration; he said that he really enjoyed Curtis' film The Girl in the Café (2005). He also cited Woody Allen, Richard Linklater and Robert Altman as further influences. His experience in journalism may have influenced his directing style.

== Filmography ==
As writer unless specified.

- Brownies (2004)
- Catatan Akhir Sekolah (Notes from the End of School; 2005)
- Cinta Silver (Silver Love; 2005)
- Alexandria (2007)
- Jomblo (Single; 2007)
- Ayat-Ayat Cinta (Verses of Love; 2007)
- Karma (2008)
- Laskar Pelangi (Rainbow Troops; 2008)
- Kambing Jantan: The Movie (2008)
- Sang Pemimpi (The Dreamers; 2009)
- Garuda di Dadaku (Garuda on my Chest; 2009)
- Pasangan Baru (New Partners; 2010; short film; as director)
- Hari Untuk Amanda (Days for Amanda; 2010)
- Jakarta Maghrib (Jakarta at Maghrib; 2010; as director)
- Sang Penari (The Dancer; 2011)
- Lima Elang (Five Eagles; 2011)
- Garuda di Dadaku 2 (Garuda on my Chest 2; 2011)
- Negeri 5 Menara (Land of Five Towers; 2012; as writer and producer)
- Yasmine (2014, Brunei)
- "Satu Hari Nanti" ("Maybe Someday"; 2017; as director)
