= Verses of Love (novel) =

2004 Indonesian novel by Habiburrahman El Shirazy

- Cover, revised edition (2006)
- Author: Habiburrahman El Shirazy
- Original title: Ayat-Ayat Cinta
- Language: Indonesian
- Genre: Islamic romance
- Publisher: Republika
- Publication date: 2004
- Publication place: Jakarta
- ISBN: 978-979-3604-02-2
- OCLC: 63024991
- Followed by: Verses of Love 2

Verses of Love (Indonesian: Ayat-Ayat Cinta) is a 2004 Islamic romantic drama novel written by Habiburrahman El Shirazy. Set in Cairo, Egypt, it follows an Indonesian student named Fahri who is falsely accused of rape after he spurns a woman's affections. With the support of his wife, Aisha, Fahri marries his Coptic Christian neighbour Maria to awaken her from a coma. Her testimony allows Fahri to be released, and she converts to Islam before dying.

Written based on El Shirazy's experiences, Verses of Love was serialized in the Indonesian newspaper Republika before being published as a novel. It soon became a best-seller within Indonesia's Muslim community, with high sales also reported in neighbouring Brunei, Malaysia, and Singapore. The 2008 film adaptation was likewise a commercial success, spawning a sequel novel in 2015 and film in 2017. Despite its commercial success, Verses of Love has not been considered part of the Indonesian literary canon. Academic studies have focused on its presentation of Islam as a means of dakwah (proselytization) as well as its main protagonist.

== Plot ==
Fahri, a Muslim Indonesian student at Al-Azhar University in Cairo, Egypt, is neighbours with the Coptic Christian Maria. Together, they arrange for another neighbour, Noura, to escape her abusive family. One day, Fahri intervenes after some men berate a veiled woman for giving up her seat to an American passenger. With the situation defused, Fahri learns that the veiled woman is a German-Turkish Muslim named Aisha, and they exchange telephone numbers.

Several weeks later, Fahri is introduced to a potential bride, who is revealed to be Aisha. They marry soon after in a lavish ceremony, and although Fahri is shocked by his new wife's wealth, their marriage is happy. Fahri turns away two women, Noura and the Indonesian student Nurul, when they confess their love for him; he urges them to be firm in their faiths. Fahri and Aisha go to Alexandria for their honeymoon. Upon their return, Fahri is arrested and accused of raping Noura. Despite torture, Fahri remains steadfast in his faith, while Aisha begins building a defence case.

Witness testimonies are dismissed, as those who come forward were asleep at the time of the alleged rape. The only accepted witness, Maria, is unable to testify as she fell ill and became comatose after learning of Fahri's marriage. Reading her diary, Maria's family learn that she loves Fahri, and they ask him to help her awaken from her coma. Fahri is granted permission to leave prison and attend the hospital. When the sound of his voice is insufficient, Aisha convinces Fahri to take Maria as a second wife.

Following Fahri's confession of love, Maria regains consciousness and provides testimony in court. Noura admits that she had been raped and impregnated by her adoptive father, and Fahri is released. This situation proves too stressful for the still-recovering Maria, who collapses. After several days, during which she dreams that she is unable to enter heaven, Maria says the Shahada and embraces Islam. She dies shortly afterwards.

== Context and production ==
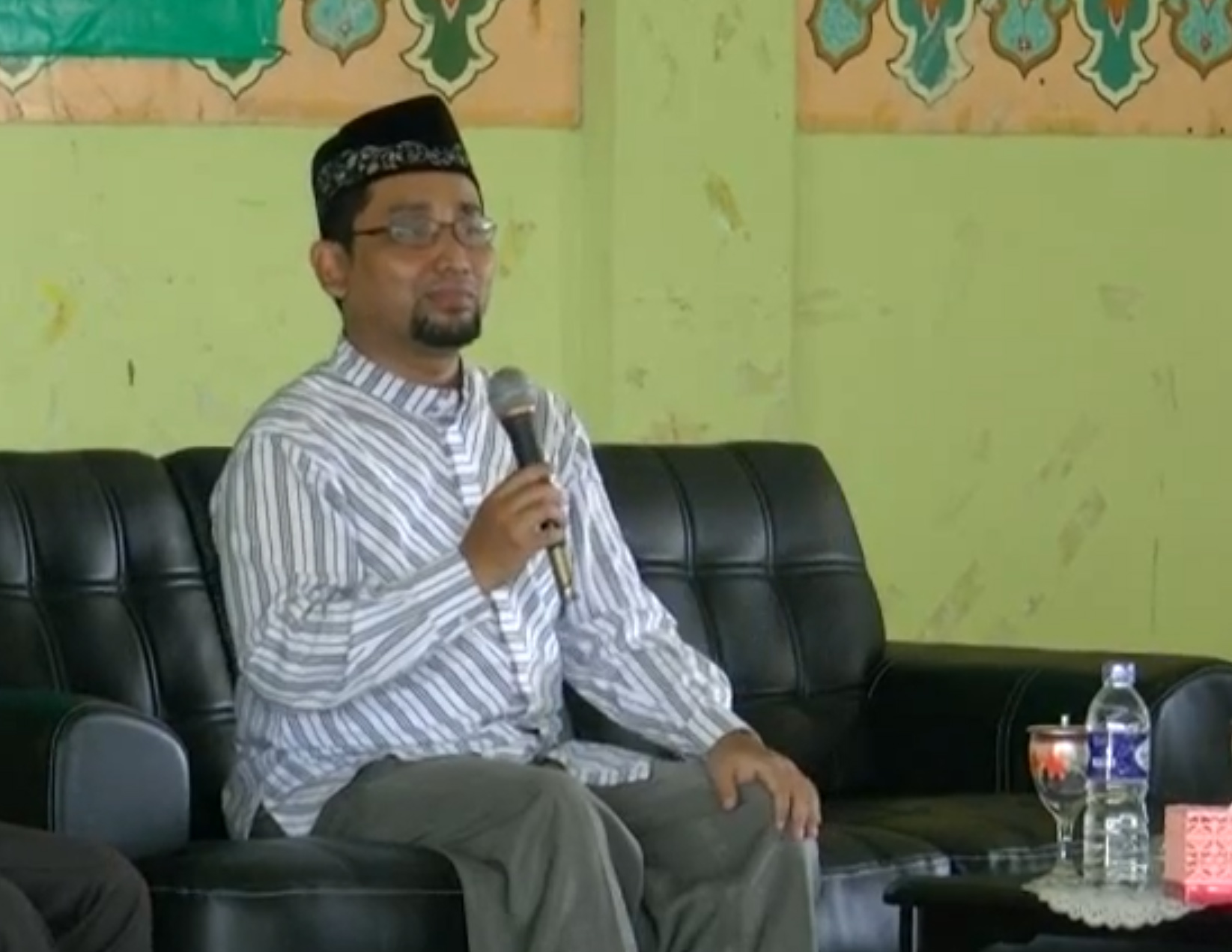
Habiburrahman El Shirazy, the author, in 2012

Although Islamic themes have long been recorded in Indonesian literature, under the New Order government there was significant tension between the regime and Indonesia's Muslims through the 1970s and 1980s. In the 1990s, President Suharto and his government began embracing the Islamic community. This was followed by a proliferation in Muslim organizations and media, including the establishment of the Muslim-oriented writers' collective Forum Lingkar Pena (FLP) in 1997. Works with explicitly Islamic themes became more commonplace in the 2000s, as political Islam began to play more of a role in Indonesian society.

Verses of Love was written by Habiburrahman El Shirazy, who had studied at Al-Azhar University in Cairo between 1995 and 2002; during this time, he had established a local branch of FLP, and worked with other literary communities. He began writing Verses of Love after being rendered unable to work by a motorcycle accident. Although he had written several pieces of short fiction, Verses of Love was El Shirazy's debut novel. It was based partially on his experiences in Egypt.

In a 2008 interview, El Shirazy described Verses of Love as intended to show the beauty of Islam and based in his belief that art provides a useful medium for promoting religious virtue. The novel drew on his interpretation of Islam's approach to several contemporary issues, including interfaith relations, interfaith marriage, and polygamy. Although the novel has been read as a counter to Salman Rushdie's The Satanic Verses (1988), El Shirazy emphasized that his main goal was to promote a positive image of Islam. He envisioned his work as reaching both Muslim and non-Muslim readers.

== Themes ==
Reviewing the construction of identity in 2000s Indonesian literature, Eggy Fajar Andalas and Sugiarti of the Muhammadiyah University of Malang describe Fahri as a symbol of tolerance and respect, both towards friends and strangers. They highlight his interactions with the American passengers, whereby he defends their right to use the facilities by identifying them as ahlu dzimmah—non-Muslims in a Muslim-majority country who are guaranteed protection according to religious law—as well as his decision to take Maria as a second wife not out of lust but to provide support. Examining Verses of Love in Indonesia and the Malay World, Mohd. Zariat Abdul Rani similarly notes that Fahri, who strictly adheres to Islamic teachings about subjects such as maintaining distance from non-muhrim (unmarriageable kin), is presented as pious yet not narrow-minded or extremist.

Due to the novel's continued emphasis on Fahri's "in-depth Islamic knowledge, intelligence, diligence, compassion, and helpfulness", researchers of Indonesian Islam Monika Arnez and Eva Nisa characterize him as providing "a utopian image of Indonesian maleness". Several writers have criticized Fahri as presenting an unachievable ideal of perfection. Rani argues, conversely, that this perfection provides a mechanism for advancing the plot, as it gives justification for the strong reactions from those women rejected by Fahri.

Andalas and Sugiarti similarly identify Maria and her openness to Islam as emphasizing religious tolerance, with the character learning the Qur'an not out of a desire to convert but rather to understand Islam and enjoy the beauty of its language. Regarding her decision to become Fahri's second wife, Rani writes that it reflects the El Shirazy's personal views on the practice, being provided as a solution to a real problem rather than a recommended or prohibited practice. Amrih Widodo of Inside Indonesia characterizes Verses of Love as translating Islamic teachings into "ordinary language applicable to real cases encountered in everyday life", thereby demonstrating "beyond doubt how to successfully mix Islam and melodramatic romance to create a bestseller".

Rani writes that Verses of Love's Islamic themes were emphasized in its presentation. These included the title, with the Indonesian-language ayat referring to verses in the Qur'an, as well as the label "sebuah novel pembangunan jiwa" ("a spiritually-affirming novel"), which linked the topic to spirituality. The cover art and author name were likewise associated with Arabia and Islam, and the biographical information provided with the novel emphasized El Shirazy's studies of hadiths and operation of a pesantren (Islamic boarding school).

== Release and reception ==
Verses of Love was serialized in the newspaper Republika between 8 April and 23 September 2004. Receiving warm reception from readers, it was published as a novel in December 2004. The work was commercially successful, selling 80,000 copies by the end of 2006; by comparison, works of "serious literature" in contemporary Indonesia tended to sell 3,000 copies or less. Within four years, it had sold 400,000 copies and been reprinted 30 times. High sales were also reported in Brunei, Malaysia, and Singapore.

Among Muslim readers, particularly those associated with the FLP, Verses of Love was a critical success. In 2005, the women's magazine Muslimah voted it as Indonesia's favourite novel, outperforming the Harry Potter series. More secular readers, however, showed little interest in the novel. Writing in 2008, the news portal Detik.com reported that most writers and critics it had contacted had not read the novel and had no interest in doing so. The writer Ayu Utami considered the novel well-written, but likened its plot to the Hollywood films of the 1950s, with a perfect hero, a person leaving their faith to embrace the majority religion, and a secondary romantic interest removed by death.

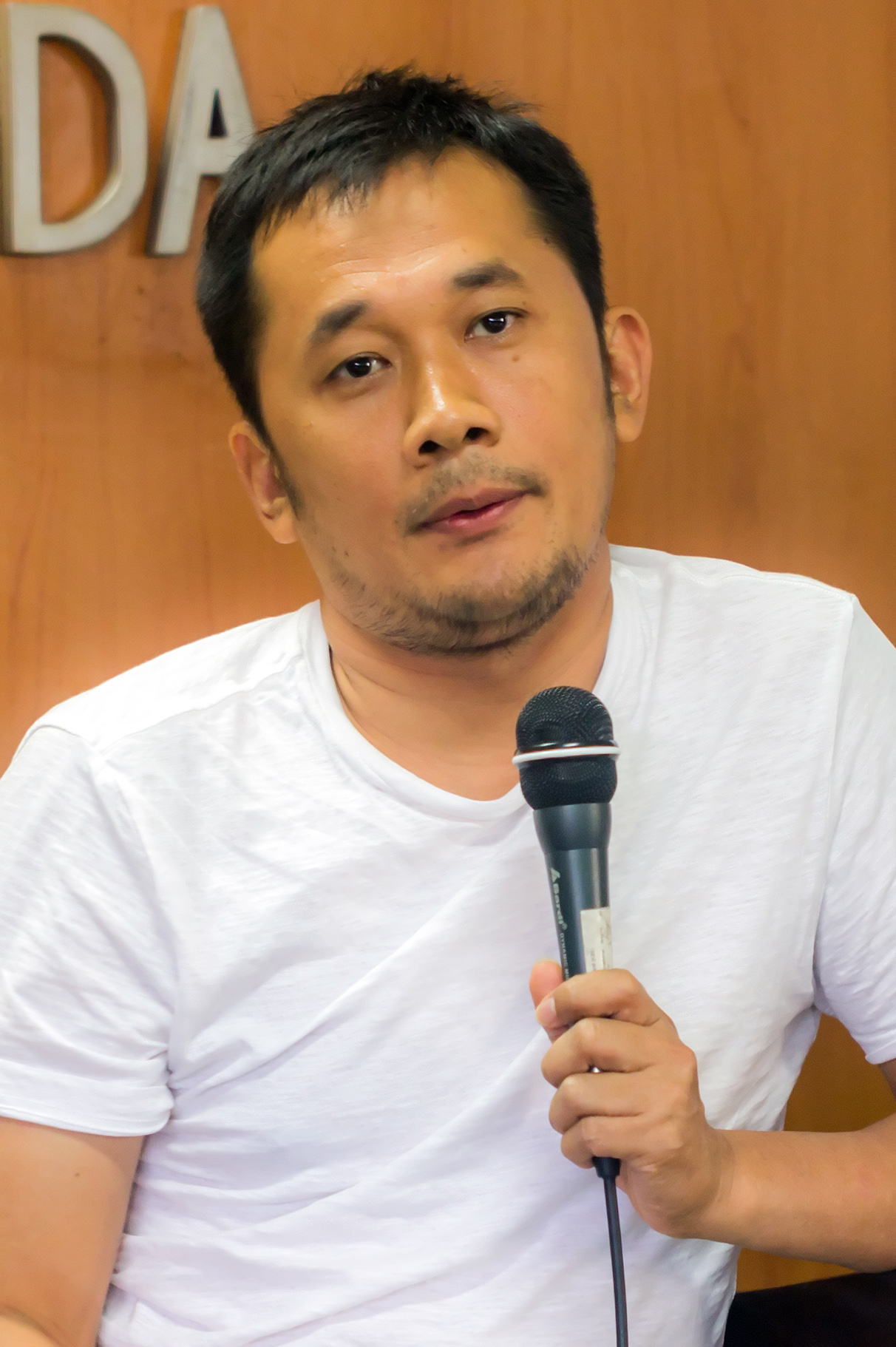
Hanung Bramantyo, director of the film Verses of Love (2008)

With the success of Verses of Love, El Shirazy became known through much of Indonesia. His royalties from the novel were reported by Republika as approximately Rp 1.5 billion (USD 100,000) as of 2007; he used the royalties from the novel to advance his dakwah (proselytization) by investing in a pesantren operated by his family. Following the commercial success of Verses of Love and similar Islamic novels, works with explicitly Islamic themes became more common in the Indonesian book market. More than fifty such novels were recorded in the 2007–2008 period. However, El Shirazy was not incorporated into the Indonesian literary canon.

== Sequel and adaptations ==
Verses of Love was adapted to film by Hanung Bramantyo, a Citra Award-winning director known for his teenage romances. Starring Fedi Nuril as Fahri, Rianti Cartwright as Aisha, and Carissa Putri as Maria, the film premiered on 28 February 2008. It drew endorsements from Din Syamsuddin, the Chairman of Muhammadiyah, as well as President Susilo Bambang Yudhoyono, and became the best-selling Indonesian film of the year. However, the film was criticized by several Islamic organizations as overly secular. El Shirazy was likewise displeased with this adaptation, insisting on becoming more involved with the 2009 adaptation of his novel Ketika Cinta Bertasbih (When Love Prays).

In 2015, El Shirazy published Verses of Love 2, which narrates Fahri's experiences teaching in Scotland while searching for Aisha, who disappeared during a trip to Palestine. In an interview with Antara, El Shirazy described this novel as difficult to produce due to readers' high expectations. An adaptation of this novel was released on 21 December 2017. Directed by Guntur Soeharjanto, it sold 2.5 million tickets within three weeks.

== Works cited ==
- Andalas, Eggy Fajar; Sugiarti (2024). "Articulation of Islamic Identity in Indonesian Popular Novels". The International Journal of Literary Humanities. 23 (2): 157–173. doi:10.18848/2327-7912/CGP/v23i02/157-173.
- Arnez, Monika (2009). "Dakwah by the Pen: Reading Helvy Tiana Rosa's Bukavu". Indonesia and the Malay World. 37 (107): 45–64. doi:10.1080/13639810902743040.
- Arnez, Monika; Nisa, Eva F. (2016). "Dimensions of Morality: The Transnational Writers' Collective Forum Lingkar Pena". Bijdragen tot de Taal-, Land- en Volkenkunde / Journal of the Humanities and Social Sciences of Southeast Asia. 172 (4): 449–478. doi:10.1163/22134379-17204003.
- "Ayu Utami: Ayat-Ayat Cinta Pengecut" [Ayu Utami: Verses of Love Is Cowardly]. Detik.com (in Indonesian). 23 March 2008. Archived from the original on 16 March 2026.
- Hermawan, Ary (4 April 2008). "Habiburrahman El Shirazy: No Intentions to Counter 'Satanic Verses'". The Jakarta Post. Jakarta. Archived from the original on 9 June 2024.
- Heryanto, Ariel (2014). Identity and Pleasure: The Politics of Indonesian Screen Culture. NUS Press. ISBN 978-9971-69-821-8.
- Mulyono (2008). "Apresiasi Masyarakat Terhadap Film Islami Ayat-Ayat Cinta (AAC)" [Public Appreciation of the Islamic Film Ayat-Ayat Cinta (AAC)]. El-Harakah. 10 (2): 119. doi:10.18860/el.v10i2.4582.
- Nancy, Yonada (20 February 2022). "Sinopsis Novel Ayat-Ayat Cinta 2 Karya Habiburrahman El-Shirazy" [Synopsis of the Novel Ayat-Ayat Cinta 2 by Habiburrahman El-Shirazy]. Tirto.id. Archived from the original on 6 March 2026.
- Paramaditha, Intan (2014). The Wild Child's Desire: Cinema, Sexual Politics, and the Experimental Nation in Post-Authoritarian Indonesia (Thesis). New York University. ProQuest 1615118801.
- Pramono, Dedi (2018). Habiburrahman El Shirazy dalam Arena Sastra dan Arena Kekuasaan Indonesia [Habiburrahman El Shirazy in the Arenas of Indonesian Literature and Power] (Thesis). Yogyakarta: Gadjah Mada University.
- Rani, Mohd. Zariat Abdul (2012). "Islam, Romance and Popular Taste in Indonesia". Indonesia and the Malay World. 40 (116): 59–73. doi:10.1080/13639811.2011.648998.
- Rokhman, Muh Arif (2022). Indonesian Islamic Fiction in the 21st Century: Representations of the Other in the Works of Forum Lingkar Pena. Yogyakarta: UAD Press. ISBN 978-623-5635-17-0.
- Sakai, Minako (2012). "Preaching to Muslim Youth in Indonesia: The Dakwah Activities of Habiburrahman El Shirazy". Review of Indonesian and Malaysian Affair. 46 (1): 9–31.
- Santosa, Lia Wanadriani (8 March 2017). "Alasan Habiburrahman El Shirazy Berat Selesaikan Ayat-Ayat Cinta 2" [The Reason Habiburrahman El Shirazy Had Difficulty Finishing Ayat-Ayat Cinta 2] (in Indonesian). Antara. Archived from the original on 11 June 2019.
- Widodo, Amrih (August–October 2008). "Writing for God: Piety and Consumption in Popular Islam". Inside Indonesia. 93. Archived from the original on 22 September 2008.
- Wirastama, Purba (9 January 2018). "Ayat-Ayat Cinta 2 Tembus 2,5 Juta Penonton" [Ayat-Ayat Cinta 2 Reaches 2.5 Million Viewers]. Metro TV. Archived from the original on 28 January 2018.
- Yuniar, Nanien (8 December 2017). "Ayat-Ayat Cinta 2 Sebarkan Pesan Perdamaian" [Ayat-Ayat Cinta 2 Spreads Message of Peace] (in Indonesian). Antara. Archived from the original on 28 January 2018.
