= Verses of Love =

Verses of Love may refer to:

- Verses of Love (novel), a 2004 novel by Habiburrahman El Shirazy
- Verses of Love (film), a 2008 film, based on the novel
