= Sang Pemimpi =

2006 novel by Andrea Hirata

The Dreamer
- First edition
- Author: Andrea Hirata
- Language: Indonesian
- Genre: Novel
- Publisher: •Yogyakarta: Bentang Pustaka
- Publication date: July 2006
- Publication place: Indonesia
- Pages: x, 292 pages
- ISBN: 979-3062-92-4

The Dreamer (Indonesian: Sang Pemimpi) is the second novel in the trilogy (formerly tetralogy) Laskar Pelangi by Andrea Hirata, published by Bentang Pusaka in July 2006. In this novel, Hirata explores themes of friendship and brotherhood. In 2021, this novel is revised with adding Edensor novel. Making Laskar Pelangi series to trilogy (the last chapter is Buku Besar Peminum Kopi in 2020, replacing Maryamah Karpov novel).

== Synopsis ==
The Dreamer is about life in the days of high school. The three main characters are Ikal, Arai, and Jimbron. Ikal is the alter-ego of Andrea Hirata, while Arai is a distant relative— an orphan often called "Simpai Keramat." He eventually becomes the foster brother of Ikal. Jimbron is an orphan who is obsessed with horses and stutters when he's enthusiastic or nervous.

All three are intertwined in the story of friendship from childhood until they go to high school. The first high school in the eastern Belitung. Attended school in the mornings and worked as a worker in the early morning fishing port, from their addiction of erotic movies in theaters and finally discovered by their religious teacher, the love story of Jimbron and Arai, Jimbron's farewell with Ikal and Arai who will study in Jakarta that makes them to separate but will still meet each other in France. Independently living separately from their parents with the background of poor economic conditions but with a big goal that if viewed from the background of their lives, is simply a dream.

== Figures ==
=== Main figures ===
1. Ikal : A poor villager's child, Arai's best friend and distant relative in the same time. He is a very good sprinter in high school as he showed the skill when he was chased by Mr. Mustar.
2. Arai : The central figure in this book. He became a foster brother to Ikal when he was in grade 3 when his father (the only remaining family member) died. Someone who can see the beauty behind something, very optimistic and always see the positive of a negative. Arai is the figure that is so spontaneous and witty, though there is nothing in this world that would make him sad and discouraged.
3. Jimbron : An orphan who was raised by a Catholic priest named Geovanny. The large, baby-faced lad is very naïve. Horses are his obsession and his stuttering is associated with a tragic event that happened when he was in elementary school; his father was dying in front of his eyes and he took his father with a bike that its speed was so slow until his father died in front of his own eyes before they arrive at the clinic. When he was asked by the people, he was already stuttering because of too many tears until he hiccups. He had always thought that if that time he used a horse; his father would be definitely alive by this second. Jimbron is the middle person between Arai and Ikal; his innocence and sincerity is the source of sympathy and love within Arai and Ikal to take care and protect him.

=== Other people ===
1. Reverend Geovanny : An Italian Catholic who take cares of Jimbron after the departure of Jimbron's parents. Despite having different religions with Jimbron, he does not impose Jimbron to become a Catholic. In fact, he was never late to send Jimbron go to the mosque for reading the Qur'an. Although he is called a Reverend, this Italian man was not a priest.
2. Mr. Mustar M. Djai'din. BA. : One of the founders of SMA Negeri Manggar. He is deputy head of SMA Negeri Manggar who is kind and patient enough but turned to rule with an iron fist when his own son would not be accepted into high school because of his being under the limit line score. Known for his severe rules of discipline and punishment but actually, he is a very good person and example.
3. Mr. Drs. Julian Ichsan Balia : SMA Negeri Manggar’s principal. A young, handsome graduate of Bandung IKIP who strongly believes in Idealism. He taught the subject art.
4. Nurmala Zakiah binti Nurmala Berahim Mantarum : Arai's love at first sight. Nurmala is a smart girl and the top of the class. She is also a fan of Ray Charles with the song "I Can't Stop Loving You" and Nat King Cole with the song When I Fall in Love.
5. Lakshmi : Jimbron's love. Having lost both of her parents, she lived and worked in a grass jelly factory. Since the departure of her parents, she never smiled though her smile is very sweet. She finally smiled when Jimbron came while riding Capo's white horse.
6. Co Pho Lamo Nyet : A person who allows a variety of things as objects for his business. Even when PN Timah was threatened of collapsing, he came up with an idea to open a horse barn although horses are foreign to the Malay community.
7. Taikong Hamim : A teacher who taught how to recite the Qur'an in the Gantung Village. Is known to be very strict and often impose physical punishment to children who make mistakes.
8. Bang Zaitun : A group leader of a small orchestra group. Known as a man who had a lot of girlfriends and almost had 5 wives. Actually, the key to his success in romance is a guitar. He also taught the techniques to Arai who was madly in love with Nurmala.
9. A Kiun : A Hokkian girl who is the guard booth in the theatre.
10. Nurmi : A gifted girl who plays violin well; inherited her talents and the violin from her grandfather who was a leader of a gambus group (A gambus is a traditional Indonesian instrument). She is Arai's and Ikal's neighbour and is of the same age as them and loves her violin.
11. Pi Cek Balsam : A handyman who tear tickets at a cinema on Belitung.
12. Am Siong : The owner of a grocery store where Ikal and Arai argued about the use of savings money.
13. Deborah Wong : A Siong's wife and Mei Mei's mum. A chubby Hong Konger.
14. Mei Mei : Deborah Wong's wee daughter.

== Adaptation ==
The manuscript of The Dreamer was adapted into a movie by the same team that made the film Laskar Pelangi that is the Miles Films and Mizan Productions and was released in 2009 in the theatres.
