= List of stage names: A =

This list of stage names lists names used by those in the entertainment industry, alphabetically by their stage name's surname (or the best approximation) followed by the given name (or the best approximation) where the surname begins with "A". One-word stage names are presented in List of one-word stage names.

Stage name	Birth name	Life	Notability	Notes
Dominique A	Dominique Ané	1968–	French songwriter and singer	
Anuel AA	Emmanuel Gazmey Santiago	1992–	Puerto Rican rapper and singer	
Angela Aames	Lois Marie Tlustos	1956–1988	American actress	
Willie Aames	Albert William Upton	1960–	American actor, director, producer and screenwriter	
Caroline Aaron	Caroline Sidney Abady	1952–	American actress	
Lee Aaron	Karen Lynn Greening	1962–	Canadian singer	
Russ Abbot	Russell Allan Roberts	1947–	English comedian, actor, singer and musician	
Victoria Abril	Victoria Mérida Rojas	1959–	Spanish actress and singer	
Goodman Ace	Goodman Aiskowitz	1899–1982	American comedian and writer	
Johnny Ace	John Marshall Alexander Jr.	1929–1954	American singer	
Mellow Man Ace	Ulpiano Sergio Reyes	1967–	Cuban-American rapper	
John Acheson	John Acheson Naylor	1934–1997	English actor	
Derek Acorah	Derek Francis Johnson	1950–2020	English spiritual medium	
Hazel Adair	Hazel Joyce Willett	1920–2005	British actress and screenwriter	
Jean Adair	Violet McNaughton	1873–1953	Canadian actress	
Prince Adam	Adam Deibert	1976–	American musician and voice actor	
Casey Adams	Max Gordon Showalter	1917–2000	American actor, composer and musician	
Catlin Adams	Nira Barab	1950–	American actress and director	
Derroll Adams	Derroll Lewis Thompson	1925–2000	American musician	
Don Adams	Donald James Yarmy	1923–2005	American actor and comedian	
Jane "Poni" Adams	Betty Jane Bierce	1918–2014	American actress	
Kathryn Adams	Kathryn Elizabeth Hohn	1920–2016	American actress	Also known as Kathryn Adams Doty
Maude Adams	Maude Ewing Adams Kiskadden	1872–1953	American actress	
Neile Adams	Maria Ruby Neilam Arrastia y Salvador	1932–	Filipina American actress	
Nick Adams	Nicholas Aloysius Adamshock	1931–1968	American actor and screenwriter	
Nancy Addison	Nancy Addison Altman	1946–2002	American actress	
Gaye Adegbalola	Gaye Todd	1944–	American singer and musician	
Fred Adison	Albert Lapeyrère	1908–1996	French singer, musician and bandleader	
Renée Adorée	Jeanne de la Fonte	1898–1933	French actress	
Iris Adrian	Iris Adrian Hostetter	1912–1994	American actress and dancer	
Max Adrian	Guy Thornton Bor	1903–1973	Irish actor and singer	
Jerry Adriani	Jair Alves de Souza	1947–2017	Brazilian singer, musician and actor	
Carina Afable	Carina Agoncillo	N/A	Filipina retired actress and singer	
Tetchie Agbayani	Visitacion Parado	1961–	Filipina actress	
Ryan Agoncillo	Kristoffer Lou Gonzales Agoncillo	1979–	Filipino actor, model, photographer, recording artist and TV host	
José Miguel Agrelot	Giuseppe Michael Agrelot Vilá	1927–2004	Puerto Rican comedian and radio/television personality	
Anja Aguilar	Angellie Urquico	1994–	Filipina actress and singer	
Marvin Agustin	Marvin Marquez Cuyugan	1979–	Filipino actor and chef	
eden ahbez	George Alexander Aberle	1908–1995	American songwriter	
Anouk Aimée	Nicole Françoise Florence Dreyfus	1932–2024	French actress	
Martin Eric Ain	Martin Erich Stricker	1967–2017	American-Swiss musician (Celtic Frost)	
Jak Airport	Jack Stafford	1958–2004	English musician (X-Ray Spex and Classix Nouveaux)	
Alexandre Aja	Alexandre Jouan-Arcady	1978–	French filmmaker	
Warda Al-Jazairia	Warda Mohammed Ftouki	1939–2012	Algerian singer	
Gina Alajar	Regina Liguid Alatiit	1959–	Filipina actress and director	
Frank Alamo	Jean-François Grandin	1941–2012	French singer	
Alan Alan	Alan Rabinowitz	1926–2014	English escapologist and magician	
Nadine Alari	Bernadette Nicole Frédérique Bovarie	1927–2016	French actress	
Emma Albani	Marie-Louise-Emma-Cécile Lejeunesse	1847–1930	Canadian-English singer	
Eddie Albert	Edward Albert Heimberger	1906–2005	American actor	
Morris Albert	Maurício Alberto Kaisermann	1951–	Brazilian singer and songwriter	
Charly Alberti	Carlos Alberto Ficicchia	1963–	Argentine musician (Soda Stereo)	
Willeke Alberti	Willy Albertina Verbrugge	1945–	Dutch singer and actress	
Bernard Albrecht	Bernard Sumner	1956–	English singer, musician, songwriter and record producer (Joy Division, New Order and Electronic)	
Alan Alda	Alphonso Joseph D'Abruzzo	1936–	American actor and comedian	
Frances Alda	Frances Jane Davis	1879–1952	New Zealand-Australian singer	
Robert Alda	Alfonso Giovanni Giuseppe Roberto D'Abruzzo	1914–1986	American actor, singer and dancer	
Rutanya Alda	Rūta Skrastiņa	1942–	Latvian-American actress	
Jason Aldean	Jason Aldine Williams	1977–	American singer	
Norman Alden	Norman Adelberg	1924–2012	American actor	
Manuel Alejandro	Manuel Álvarez-Beigbeder Pérez	1932–	Spanish composer	
Rauw Alejandro	Raúl Alejandro Ocasio Ruiz	1993–	Puerto Rican singer and songwriter	
Flex Alexander	Mark Alexander Knox	1970–	American actor, comedian and dancer	
George Alexander	George Alexander Gibb Samson	1858–1918	English actor and producer	
Gregg Alexander	Gregory Aiuto	1970–	American musician, singer-songwriter and producer (New Radicals)	Also known as Alex Ander and Cessyl Orchestra
Jane Alexander	Jane Quigley	1939–	American actress	
Jason Alexander	Jay Scott Greenspan	1959–	American comedian and actor	
Jean Alexander	Jean Margaret Hodgkinson	1926–2016	English actress	
Max Alexander	Michael Drelich	1953–2016	American comedian and actor	
Peter Alexander	Peter Alexander Ferdinand Maximilian Neumayer	1926–2011	Austrian actor and singer	
Pico Alexander	Alexander Lukasz Jogalla	1991–	American actor	
Ross Alexander	Alexander Ross Smith Jr.	1907–1937	American actor	
Sarah Alexander	Sarah Smith	1971–	English actress	
Johnny Alf	Alfredo José da Silva	1929–2010	Brazilian musician	
El Alfa	Emanuel Herrera Batista	1990–	Dominican rapper	
Cas Alfonso	Alfoncius Dapot Parulian Nainggolan	1983–	Indonesian singer	
Rashied Ali	Robert Patterson	1933–2009	American musician	
Mary Alice	Mary Alice Smith	1936–2022	American actress	
John Alkin	John Kenneth Foinquinos	1947–	English actor and spiritual healer	
Chad Allan	Allan Peter Stanley Kowbel	1943–2023	Canadian musician (The Guess Who)	Also known as Allan Kobel
Jed Allan	Jed Allan Brown	1935–2019	American actor and television host	
Barbara Jo Allen	Marian Barbara Henshall	1906–1974	American actress	Also known as Vera Vague
Byron Allen	Byron Allen Folks	1961–	American producer and comedian	
Chad Allen	Chad Allen Lazzari	1974–	American retired actor	
Chesney Allen	William Ernest Chesney Allen	1894–1982	English music hall performer and comedian (Flanagan and Allen)	
Corey Allen	Alan Cohen	1934–2010	American director, writer, producer and actor	
Dave Allen	David Tynan O'Mahony	1936–2005	Irish comedian and actor	
Dayton Allen	Dayton Allen Bolke	1919–2004	American actor and comedian	
Elizabeth Allen	Elizabeth Ellen Gillease	1929–2006	American actress and singer	
Fred Allen	John Florence Sullivan	1894–1956	American comedian and actor	
Hoodie Allen	Steven Adam Markowitz	1988–	American rapper, singer and songwriter	
Judith Allen	Marie Elliott	1911–1996	American actress	Also known as Mari Colman
Marty Allen	Morton David Alpern	1922–2018	American comedian and actor	
Peter Allen	Peter Richard Woolnough	1944–1992	Australian singer-songwriter	
Rae Allen	Rae Julia Theresa Abruzzo	1926–2022	American actress, director and singer	
Robert Allen	Irvine E. Theodore Baehr	1906–1998	American actor	
Rosalie Allen	Julie Marlene Bedra	1924–2003	American singer, songwriter and musician	
Tim Allen	Timothy Alan Dick	1953–	American comedian and actor	
Peggy Allenby	Eleanor Byrne Fox	1896–1966	American actress	
Claud Allister	William Claud Michael Palmer	1888–1970	English actor	
June Allyson	Eleanor Geisman	1917–2006	American actress, dancer and singer	
Letty Alonzo	Blanca Leticia Arrastia y Johnson	1929–2020	Filipina actress	
Dora Altmann	Dora Tremmel	1881–1971	German actress	
Bobby Alto	Robert Altomare	1938–2012	American actor and comedian	
Don Alvarado	José Ray Paige	1904–1967	American actor	
Max Alvarado	Gavino Maximo Teodosio	1929–1997	Filipino actor	
Kirk Alyn	John Feggo Jr.	1910–1999	American actor	
Alyona Alyona	Aliona Olehivna Savranenko	1991–	Ukrainian rapper, singer and songwriter	
DJ AM	Adam Michael Goldstein	1973–2009	American DJ	
Rambo Amadeus	Antonije Pušić	1963–	Montenegrin author	
Lucine Amara	Lucine Tockqui Armaganian	1925–2024	American singer	
Remedios Amaya	María Dolores Amaya Vega	1962–	Spanish flamenco singer	
August Ames	Mercedes Grabowski	1994–2017	Canadian pornographic actress	
Ed Ames	Edmund Dantes Urick	1927–2023	American singer and actor	
Leon Ames	Harry Leon Wycoff	1902–1993	American actor	
Nancy Ames	Nancy Hamilton Alfaro	1937–	American singer and songwriter	
Rachel Ames	Rachel Kay Foulger	1929–	American actress	
Trudi Ames	Trudi Ziskind	1946–	American former actress	
Kamal Amrohi	Syed Amir Haider Kamal Naqvi	1918–1993	Indian director and screenwriter	
Alice Amter	Alice Edwards	1966–	English actress	
Luana Anders	Luana Margo Anderson	1938–1996	American actress and screenwriter	
Merry Anders	Mary Helen Anderson	1934–2012	American actress and model	
Thomas Anders	Bernd Weidung	1963–	German singer, songwriter and producer (Modern Talking)	
Elisabeth Andersen	Anna Elisabeth de Bruijn	1920–2018	Dutch actress	
Lale Andersen	Elisabeth Carlotta Helena Berta Bunnenberg	1905–1972	German singer-songwriter	
Broncho Billy Anderson	Maxwell Henry Aronson	1880–1971	American actor, writer, director and producer	
Capri Anderson	Christina Walsh	1987/1988–	American pornographic actress	
Daphne Anderson	Daphne Margaret Scrutton	1922–2013	English actress	
Gerry Anderson	Gerald Alexander Anderson	1929–2012	English producer, writer and director	
Juliet Anderson	Judith Carr	1938–2010	American pornographic actress and producer	
Fern Andra	Vernal Edna Andrews	1893–1974	American actress, director and producer	
Annette Andre	Annette Christine Andreallo	1939–	Australian actress	
Gwili Andre	Gurli Ingeborg Elna Andresen	1907–1959	Danish model and actress	
Lona Andre	Launa Anderson	1915–1992	American actress	
Peter Andre	Peter James Andrea	1973–	British-Australian singer, songwriter and media personality	
Stanley Andrews	Stanley Martin Andrzejewski	1891–1969	American actor	
Tod Andrews	Theodore Edwin Anderson	1914–1972	American actor	
Bob Andy	Keith Anderson	1944–2020	Jamaican singer and songwriter	
Horace Andy	Horace Keith Hinds	1951–	Jamaican songwriter and singer	
Katja Andy	Käthe Aschaffenburg	1907–2013	German-American musician	
Criss Angel	Christopher Nicholas Sarantakos	1967–	American magician and musician	
Julio Ángel	Julio Manuel Acevedo Lanuza	1945–2015	Puerto Rican singer	
Pier Angeli	Anna Maria Pierangeli	1932–1971	Italian actress, singer and model	
Steve Angello	Steve Patrik Angello Josefsson Fragogiannis	1982–	Greek-Swedish DJ and producer (Swedish House Mafia)	
Yaba Angelosi	Angelo Maku		South Sudanese American singer	
Kenneth Anger	Kenneth Wilbur Anglemyer	1927–2023	American underground experimental filmmaker	
John Aniston	Yannis Anastassakis	1933–2022	Greek-American actor	
Glory Annen	Glory Anne Clibbery	1952–2017	Canadian actress	
Adam Ant	Stuart Leslie Goddard	1954–	English singer, musician and actor (Adam and the Ants)	
Chris Anthony	Christine D'Antonio	1957–	American voice actress	
Gerald Anthony	Gerald Anthony Bucciarelli	1951–2004	American actor	
Joseph Anthony	Joseph Deuster	1912–1993	American playwright, actor and director	
Little Anthony	Jerome Gourdine	1941–	American singer (Little Anthony and the Imperials)	
Lysette Anthony	Lysette Anne Chodzko	1963–	English actress and model	
Marc Anthony	Marco Antonio Muñiz	1968–	American singer, songwriter and actor	
Michael Anthony	Michael Anthony Sobolewski	1954–	American musician (Van Halen)	
Ray Anthony	Raymond Antonini	1922–	American retired bandleader, musician, songwriter and actor (Glenn Miller Orchestra)	
Steve Anthony	Stephen Anthony Gomes	1959–	Canadian former broadcaster	
Laura Antonelli	Laura Antonaz	1941–2015	Italian actress	
Rafaela Aparicio	Rafaela Díaz Valiente	1906–1996	Spanish actress	
Navodaya Appachan	Maliampurackal Chacko Punnoose	1924–2012	Indian producer and director	
Fiona Apple	Fiona Apple McAfee-Maggart	1977–	American singer-songwriter	
Stella Arbenina	Stella Zoe Whishaw	1884–1976	Russian-born English actress	
Penny Arcade	Susana Carmen Ventura	1950–	American performance artist, actress and playwright	
John Archer	Ralph Bowman	1915–1999	American actor	
Don Arden	Harry Levy	1926–2007	English music manager	
Eve Arden	Eunice Mary Quedens	1908–1990	American actress and comedienne	
Jane Arden	Norah Patricia Morris	1927–1982	Welsh film director, actress, singer/songwriter and poet	
Jann Arden	Jann Arden Richards	1962–	Canadian singer-songwriter and actress	
Michael Arden	Michael Jerrod Moore	1982–	American actor, singer, musician and director	
Neal Arden	Arthur Neal Aiston	1909–2014	English actor	
Toni Arden	Antoinette Ardizzone	1924–2012	American singer	
Donna Ares	Azra Kolaković	1977–2017	Bosnian singer	
Imperio Argentina	María Magdalena Nile del Río	1906–2003	Argentine-Spanish singer and actress	
Victor Argo	Victor Jimenez	1934–2004	Puerto Rican-American actor	
Zohar Argov	Zohar Orkabi	1955–1987	Israeli singer	
Pearl Argyle	Pearl Wellman	1910–1947	South African dancer and actress	
Nina Arianda	Nina Arianda Matijcio	1984–	American actress	
Harold Arlen	Hyman Arluck	1905–1986	American composer	
Richard Arlen	Sylvanus Richard Mattimore	1899–1976	American actor	
George Arliss	Augustus George Andrews	1868–1946	English actor and filmmaker	
Kay Armen	Armenuhi Manoogian	1915–2011	American-Armenian singer	
James Arness	James King Aurness	1923–2011	American actor	
Sig Arno	Siegfried Aron	1895–1975	German-Jewish actor	
Danny Arnold	Arnold Rothmann	1925–1995	American actor, comedian, director and producer	
Edward Arnold	Günther Edward Arnold Schneider	1890–1956	American actor	
Farida Arriany	Frieda Thenu	1938–1977	Indonesian actress, model and singer	Also known as Frieda Shagniarty
Robert Arthur	Robert Paul Arthaud	1925–2008	American actor	
Carol Arthur	Carol Arata	1935–2020	American actress	
Jean Arthur	Gladys Georgianna Greene	1900–1991	American actress	
Julia Arthur	Ida Lewis	1869–1950	Canadian-born American actress	
Kon Artis	Denaun Montez Porter	1978–	American rapper and music producer (D12)	Also known as Mr. Porter and Denaun
Linda Arvidson	Linda Arvidson Johnson	1884–1949	American actress	Also known as Linda Griffith
Annaleigh Ashford	Annaleigh Swanson	1985–	American actress, singer and dancer	
Edward Ashley	Edward Montague Hussey Cooper	1906–2000	Australian-born American actor	
Elizabeth Ashley	Elizabeth Ann Cole	1939–	American actress	
David Ashton	David Scott	1941–	Scottish actor and writer	
Lena Ashwell	Lena Margaret Pocock	1872–1957	English actress	
K. Asif	Asif Karim	1922–1971	Indian director, producer and screenwriter	
Leon Askin	Leo Aschkenasy	1907–2005	Austrian-American actor	
Adele Astaire	Adele Marie Austerlitz	1896–1981	American dancer, actress and singer	
Fred Astaire	Frederick Austerlitz	1899–1987	American dancer, actor and singer	
Betty Astell	Betty Julia Hymans	1912–2005	English actress	
Skylar Astin	Skylar Astin Lipstein	1987–	American actor and singer	
Mary Astor	Lucile Vasconcellos Langhanke	1906–1987	American actress	
Rich Asuncion	Richell Pacaldo Angalot-Mudie	1989–	Filipina actress	
Christopher Atkins	Christopher Atkins Bomann	1961–	American actor and businessman	
Cholly Atkins	Charles Sylvan Atkinson	1913–2003	American dancer and performer	
Jeanne Aubert	Jeanne Perrinot	1900–1988	French singer and actress	Also known as Jane Aubert
Isabelle Aubret	Thérèse Coquerelle	1938–	French singer	
James Aubrey	James Aubrey Tregidgo	1947–2010	English actor	
Cécile Aubry	Anne-José Madeleine Henriette Bénard	1928–2010	French actress, author, screenwriter and director	
Eleanor Audley	Eleanor Zellman	1905–1991	American actress	
Stéphane Audran	Colette Suzanne Jeannine Dacheville	1932–2018	French actress	
Pascale Audret	Pascale Aiguionne Louise Jacqueline Marie Auffray	1935–2000	French actress	
Mischa Auer	Mikhail Semyonovich Unkovsky	1905–1967	Russian-American actor	
Chris August	Christopher August Megert	1982–	American musician	
Jean-Pierre Aumont	Jean-Pierre Philippe Salomons	1911–2001	French actor	
Nora Aunor	Nora Cabaltera Villamayor	1953–2025	Filipina actress, singer and producer	
Tom Austen	Thomas Michael Carter	1987–	English actor	
Coco Austin	Nicole Natalie Austin	1979–	American television personality and actress	Also known as Coco, Coco Marie Austin, Coco Marie and Coco-T
Gene Austin	Lemeul Eugene Lucas	1900–1972	American singer and songwriter	
Jake T. Austin	Jake Toranzo Austin Szymanski	1994–	American actor	
Lovie Austin	Cora Taylor	1887–1972	American bandleader, musician, composer, singer and arranger	Also known as Cora Calhoun and Cora Austin
Amy Austria	Esmeralda Dizon Tuazon-Ventura	1961–	Filipina actress	
Ricardo Autobahn	John Matthews	1978–	English producer, songwriter and musician	
Frankie Avalon	Francis Thomas Avallone	1940–	American actor and singer	
Natalia Avelon	Natalia Siwek	1980–	Polish-German actress and singer	
Val Avery	Sebouh Der Abrahamian	1924–2009	American actor	
Jane Avril	Jeanne Louise Beaudon	1868–1943	French dancer	
Charlotte Ayanna	Charlotte Lopez	Unknown	Puerto Rico-born American actress, author and former beauty queen	Also known as Charlotte Roldan
John Ayldon	John Arnold	1943–2013	English opera singer and actor	
Agnes Ayres	Agnes Henkel	1892–1940	American actress	
Iggy Azalea	Amethyst Amelia Kelly	1990–	Australian retired rapper and songwriter	
Charles Aznavour	Shahnur Vaghinak Aznavourian	1924–2018	French-Armenian singer, lyricist and actor	
Seda Aznavour	Seda Aznavourian	1947–	French singer	
