= Ketika Cinta Bertasbih =

- Theatrical poster
- Directed by: Chaerul Umam
- Screenplay by: Imam Tantowi
- Based on: Ketika Cinta Bertasbih by Habiburrahman El Shirazy
- Produced by: Leo Sutanto; Lili Sunawati
- Starring: Cholidi Asadil Alam; Alice Norin; Oki Setiana Dewi
- Cinematography: Rudy Kurwet
- Edited by: Rizal Basri
- Music by: Anto Hoed; Melly Goeslaw
- Production company: SinemArt Pictures
- Release date: June 11, 2009 (Indonesia)
- Running time: 122 minutes
- Country: Indonesia
- Language: Indonesian

Ketika Cinta Bertasbih (Note: The Indonesian-language title, which Yazid (2009) describes as difficult to translate, has variously been rendered as When Love Is Extolled (Yazid 2009), When Love Glorifies God (Imanjaya 2009), When Love Praises God (Hariyadi 2013, p. 449), When Love Exalts God (Barker 2019, p. 116), and When Love Has a Tasbih (Heryanto 2014, p. 65). This article uses the Indonesian title for consistency.) is a 2009 Indonesian Islamic romance film directed by Chaerul Umam. Starring Cholidi Asadil Alam, Alice Norin, and Oki Setiana Dewi, it follows a young Indonesian student of Al-Azhar University in Cairo, Egypt, who is caught in a love triangle with the daughter of an ambassador and a master's student.

Based on the novel of the same name by Habiburrahman El Shirazy, Ketika Cinta Bertasbih was released following the success of Ayat-Ayat Cinta (Verses of Love, 2008). Dissatisfied with the earlier adaptation of his novel, the filmmakers cast amateurs through a lengthy open audition process and emphasized the film's Islamic nature. Produced with a budget of approximately Rp 40 billion (USD 4 million), Ketika Cinta Bertasbih was released on 11 June 2009 to commercial success, becoming the best-selling Indonesian film of the year. The film received several awards, as well as a sequel and two television series.

== Plot ==
Azzam (Cholidi Asadil Alam) is an Indonesian student at Al-Azhar University in Cairo, Egypt. Eliana (Alice Norin) asks him to cater an event hosted by her father, the Indonesian ambassador. The following day, she offers him a French kiss in return, which he refuses. Ali (Didi Petet), an embassy driver, urges him not to return Eliana's affection, instead suggesting the master's student Anna (Oki Setiana Dewi) as a better match. Although Azzam doubts their compatibility, as he sells food whereas Anna is the daughter of a noted kyai (Islamic scholar), Ali insists. Following up on Ali's recommendation, Azzam learns that Anna has already received a proposal from his friend Furqon (Andi Arsyil Rahman). He is dissuaded from pursuing a relationship by Ustad Mujab (Habiburrahman El Shirazy), who emphasises their different statuses. Meanwhile, Anna and Furqon both have qualms about their potential relationship.

A series of tribulations challenges the Indonesian students. Azzam's apartment is breached by police looking for a criminal named Wail; although they leave, Azzam's roommate, Fadhil (Lucky Perdana), faints. Meanwhile, Furqon, preparing to defend his thesis, awakens to an email threatening to release compromising pictures should he fail to pay. Anna and her friend leave their bags on a bus; Azzam helps them, paying a taxi driver to chase after the bus so they can retrieve their belongings. After their interaction on the bus, Anna and Azzam develop affections for each other. However, as Anna never introduced herself, they realize the difficulty of reuniting. Seeing that Anna is due to moderate a seminar, Azzam attends and recognizes her from the bus. He asks Mujab to introduce them, but Anna cannot as she is due to fly to Kuala Lumpur, Malaysia, for research. Meanwhile, Eliana continues to pursue Azzam, asking him to cater her birthday.

Furqon learns that his extorter, revealed to be an Israeli serial blackmailer, has been caught. He is advised that most of her victims develop AIDS; after being tested, he is found to be HIV positive. To ensure the secrecy of his diagnosis, he returns to Indonesia. Anna also returns to Indonesia, befriending Azzam's sister during a speaking tour in Surakarta, Central Java. She formally accepts Furqon's proposal upon the condition that he not take a second wife. Furqon, remembering his promise not to spread the disease, is conflicted. Azzam and Eliana also fly to Indonesia, taking the same flight. After disembarking, they are surrounded by a group of reporters intent on learning about Eliana's upcoming soap opera. Eliana attempts to introduce Azzam as her boyfriend. Azzam dismisses this, calling himself her tempeh seller, and waves to his sister.

== Production ==
Ketika Cinta Bertasbih was directed by Chaerul Umam, who had a reputation for directing films with Islamic themes but had not worked in cinema since the failure of Fatahillah in 1997, for SinemArt Pictures. The soundtrack for the film was provided by Anto Hoed and Melly Goeslaw; the latter considered the soundtrack more difficult than her usual work on teen romances, due to its religious themes. Cinematography was handled by Rudy Kurwet, with artistic direction by El Badrun and sound arrangement by Adityawan Susanto. Editing was handled by Rizal Basri.

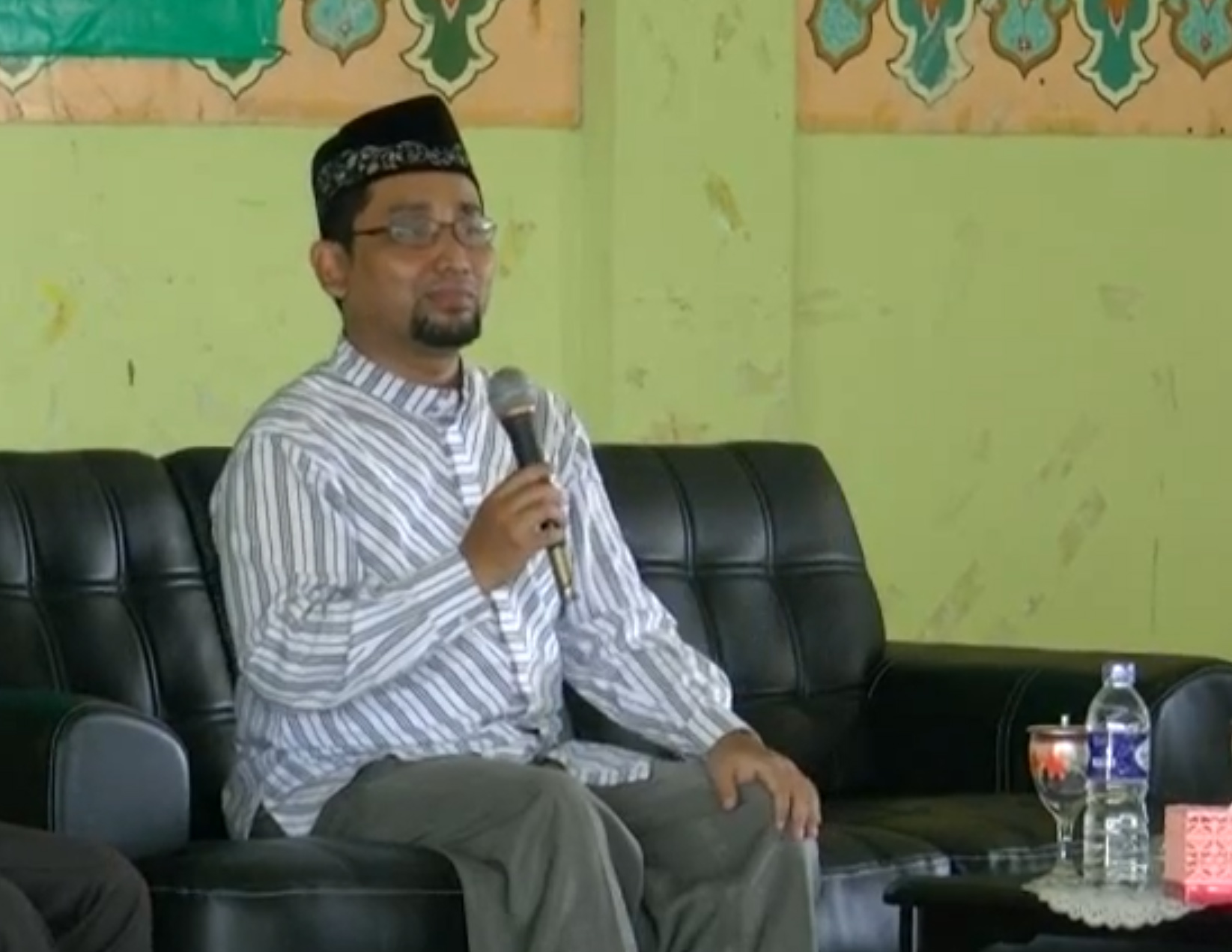
Habiburrahman El Shirazy, author of the source novel and actor in the film

The screenplay for Ketika Cinta Bertasbih was written by Imam Tantowi, an established director, based on the novel of the same name by Habiburrahman El Shirazy. El Shirazy had risen to prominence through the commercial success of Ayat-Ayat Cinta (Verses of Love, 2008), an adaptation of his 2004 novel which sold more than three million tickets. Despite this success, El Shirazy was displeased with the changes made during Hanung Bramantyo's adaptation, and thus decided to become more involved in the filmmaking process. He also sought a cast of amateurs, fearing that professional actors may move on to roles contrary to Islamic teachings.

Consequently, open casting for Ketika Cinta Bertasbih was conducted in several Indonesian cities, including Jakarta, Padang, Surabaya, Pontianak, and Makassar, over a period of three and a half months. These auditions were designed to find newcomers who had both the desired acting ability and understanding of Islamic teachings. After auditioning some 7,000 aspirants, a short list of candidates was compiled, with the final audition televised on RCTI and judged by a panel including El Shirazy.

These auditions resulted in the casting of Cholidi Asadil Alam, Alice Norin, Andi Arsyil Rahman, Oki Setiana Dewi, and Meyda Sefira. Aside from Norin, who had had experience in soap operas, none of the actors cast through the talent search had previous acting credits. All, however, had competed at the national level in other fields. Several supporting roles were taken by established actors such as Niniek L. Karim and Deddy Mizwar, though they had limited screentime.

The budget for Ketika Cinta Bertasbih was large by Indonesian standards, approximately Rp 40 billion (USD 4 million). Shooting took place in Egypt and in Indonesia. As part of its emphasis on Islamic messaging, unmarried actors and actresses were not allowed to touch on screen.

== Release and reception ==
Prior to release, Ketika Cinta Bertasbih was promoted heavily, being billed as a "mega film" through large billboards. Emphasis was given to its location shooting in Egypt, as well as claims that it would "shake eight countries". The film received endorsements from prominent religious leaders, and parliamentarians such as Hidayat Nur Wahid, and it was one of the first films labelled halal by the Indonesian Ulama Council. On 11 June 2009, Ketika Cinta Bertasbih received a wide release in 148 cinemas throughout Indonesia. Post-release advertising emphasized the growing viewership, with two million tickets sold after two months, and a total of three million tickets sold during the film's theatrical run. It was the best-selling Indonesian film of 2009.

Reviewing for The Jakarta Post, Nauval Yazid deemed Ketika Cinta Bertasbih a disappointment, staying too true to the novel and following an overly passive protagonist. He highlighted the film's panoramic views as its strongest asset. Internet reviews accused the film of being overly verbose, contrasting its use of diction with the more filmic approach used by Iranian filmmakers. Many audience members compared Ketika Cinta Bertasbih with Ayat-Ayat Cinta, generally unfavourably.

== Sequels ==
A sequel, Ketika Cinta Bertasbih 2, was announced for 17 September 2009, during the Ramadan holiday. Shot concurrently with the first film, it follows Azzam's life in Indonesia after graduating from Al Azhar, including his struggle selling bakso (meatball soup) and his ultimate marriage to Anna. This film was also a commercial success, though it did not sell as many tickets, with a viewership of approximately 1.4 million. Ketika Cinta Bertasbih 2 received two nominations at the 2009 Indonesian Film Festival, for best supporting actor and best supporting actress, as well as two Golden Screen Awards at the 2010 Indonesian Movie Awards.

A television adaptation of Ketika Cinta Bertasbih was broadcast on RCTI for Ramadan 2010. Taking place over 56 episodes and featuring the original cast, this series depicted Azzam and Anna as taking the leadership of a pesantren (Islamic boarding school) while dealing with difficulty conceiving a child. A second series, which received the subtitle Meraih Ridho Ilahi (Achieving the Divine's Blessing), followed in 2011 and ran for 25 episodes.

== Awards ==
Ketika Cinta Bertasbih received three awards at the 2010 Indonesian Movie Awards, as well as two awards at the 2010 Bandung Film Festival.

Award	Year	Category	Nominee	Result	Ref.
Indonesian Movie Awards	2010	Golden Screen Award for Favourite Supporting Actress	Oki Setiana Dewi	Won	
Indonesian Movie Awards	2010	Golden Screen Award for Favourite New Actor	Kholidi Asadil Alam	Won	
Indonesian Movie Awards	2010	Golden Screen Award for Favourite New Actress	Oki Setiana Dewi	Won	
Bandung Film Festival	2010	Bandung Film Festival Prize for Best Supporting Actress	Alice Norin	Won	
Bandung Film Festival	2010	Bandung Film Festival Prize for Best Editing	Rizal Basri	Won	

== Works cited ==
- Barker, Thomas (2019). Indonesian Cinema after the New Order: Going Mainstream. Hong Kong University Press. ISBN 978-988-8528-07-3.
- "Berdurasi 4 Jam, 'Ketika Cinta Bertasbih' Dibelah Dua" [4 Hours in Duration, 'Ketika Cinta Bertasbih' Divided in Two]. Detik.com (in Indonesian). 3 June 2009. Archived from the original on 13 March 2026.
- "Daftar Lengkap Pemeran dan Kru Ketika Cinta Bertasbih" [Complete List of Cast and Crew for Ketika Cinta Bertasbih]. filmindonesia.or.id (in Indonesian). Konfiden Foundation. Archived from the original on 13 March 2026.
- Hidayah, Aguslia (21 July 2010). "Ketika Cinta Bertasbih Berlanjut ke Layar Kaca" [Ketika Cinta Bertasbih Continues on the Glass Screen]. Tempo (in Indonesian). Archived from the original on 13 March 2026.
- Hariyadi (2013). "Finding Islam in Cinema: Islamic Films and the Identity of Indonesian Muslim Youths". Al-Jami'ah: Journal of Islamic Studies. 51 (2). doi:10.14421/ajis.2013.512.443-473.
- Heryanto, Ariel (2014). Identity and Pleasure: The Politics of Indonesian Screen Culture. NUS Press. ISBN 978-9971-69-821-8.
- Imanjaya, Ekky (9 August 2009). "'When Love Glorifies God'". Inside Indonesia. Archived from the original on 13 March 2026.
- "Melly Finds Writing Religious Songs Hard". The Jakarta Post. 16 September 2008. Archived from the original on 20 September 2008.
- "Penghargaan Ketika Cinta Bertasbih" [Awards for Ketika Cinta Bertasbih]. filmindonesia.or.id (in Indonesian). Konfiden Foundation. Archived from the original on 13 March 2026.
- "Penghargaan Ketika Cinta Bertasbih 2" [Awards for Ketika Cinta Bertasbih 2]. filmindonesia.or.id (in Indonesian). Konfiden Foundation. Archived from the original on 13 March 2026.
- Priyambodo RH (16 June 2008). "Film "Ketika Cinta Bertasbih" Siap Edar Maret 2009" [Film "Ketika Cinta Bertasbih" Ready to Release March 2009] (in Indonesian). Antara. Archived from the original on 13 March 2026.
- Rakhmani, Inaya (2014). "Mainstream Islam: Television Industry Practice and Trends in Indonesian Sinetron". Asian Journal of Social Science. 42 (3/4): 435–466.
- Rokhman, Muh Arif (2022). Indonesian Islamic Fiction in the 21st Century: Representations of the Other in the Works of Forum Lingkar Pena. Yogyakarta: UAD Press. ISBN 978-623-5635-17-0.
- Sakai, Minako (2012). "Preaching to Muslim Youth in Indonesia: The Dakwah Activities of Habiburrahman El Shirazy". Review of Indonesian and Malaysian Affair. 46 (1): 9–31.
- Kurniasari, Triwik (27 December 2009). "Cinema Comes Out of the Dark Ages". The Jakarta Post. Archived from the original on 29 March 2010.
- Yazid, Nauval (14 June 2009). "'Ketika Cinta Bertasbih': Offers Picturesque Views – and Nothing Else". The Jakarta Post. Jakarta. Archived from the original on 11 March 2026.
