= Carissa Putri =

Indonesian actress and model

- Born: Carissa Putri Sulaiman; September 12, 1984 (age 41); Sumedang, Indonesia
- Other names: Carissa Putri, Carissa Sulaiman
- Occupations: Actress, model
- Years active: 2004-present
- Known for: Playing role as Maria Girgis in the film "Ayat-Ayat Cinta"

Carissa Putri Sulaiman (born September 12, 1984) is an Indonesian actress and model best known for her role as Maria Girgis in the romantic religious Indonesian hit film Ayat-Ayat Cinta (a.k.a. Verses of Love) in 2008 and "The Tarix Jabrix" on the same year.

Carissa is the daughter of Ris Isa Soelaiman and Lily S.P., an Indonesian actress. Carissa is of Malay-Indonesian-German-Dutch-Javanese descent.

Carissa attended Pelita Harapan University in Indonesia majoring in Faculty of Social and Political Science.

== Career ==
Carissa started her career as a model and played supporting roles in some of Indonesian soap operas before landing her breakout role in a successful romantic religious film Ayat-Ayat Cinta (a.k.a. Verses of Love) in 2008, based on a best-selling novel with the same title written by Habiburrahman El Shirazy, where she played a leading role as Maria Girgis. On the same year she played on another success comedy film "The Tarix Jabrix".

She also had appeared in many Indonesian drama series including "Satu Bunga Empat Kumbang", "Jangan Pisahkan Aku", "Aqso dan Madina", "Hikmah 3", "Anggun", "Rafika", "Date with Danella", "Mertua dan Menantu", and "I Love You Boss" along with Indonesian presenter and actor, Daniel Mananta.

== Filmography ==
=== Films ===
- Ayat-Ayat Cinta (2008)
- The Tarix Jabrix (2008)
- Catatan (Harian) Si Boy (2011)

=== Television series ===
- Anggun (with Luna Maya and Ben Joshua)
- Siti Nurbaya
- Hikmah 3
- Jangan Pisahkan Aku
- 1 Bunga 4 Kumbang
- I Love U Bos
- Aqso dan Madina (2008)
- Rafika (2008)

=== FTV ===
- Date with Danella
