= Muslimah (magazine) =

Indonesian teen magazine (2002–2007)

- Cover, March 2003
- Frequency: Monthly
- Publisher: PT Variapop Group
- First issue: August 2002; 23 years ago
- Final issue: 2007; 19 years ago
- Country: Indonesia
- Based in: Jakarta
- Language: Indonesian

Muslimah (Indonesian for "Muslim Woman") was an Indonesian teen magazine published between 2002 and 2007. Edited by Mustafa bin Haji Ton and Wirdaningsih Aminuddin Yunus, the magazine capitalized on the jilbab gaul ("trendy veils") trend to present veiling as a diverse and personal practice. It also covered news, fiction, and literature.

== History ==
Muslimah was launched in August 2002 by PT Variapop Group, operated by the Malaysia-born Mustafa bin Haji Ton. Mustafa and his wife, the Padang-born Wirdaningsih Aminuddin Yunus, served as editors. Muslimah was oriented predominantly towards teenaged Muslim women, taking the slogan "Tren Remaja Islam" ("Youth Muslim Trends"). At the time, PT Variapop already published Hidayah magazine, another periodical with Islamic themes.

Muslimah was established at a time when young Indonesian Muslim women were increasingly embracing a style known as jilbab gaul ("trendy veils"), which sought to combine Islamic fashion with contemporary trends, and sought to reach fashion-conscious youths who desired to remain veiled. Other publications established for young Muslim readers during this period included Karima, Nikah, and Noor. Muslimah was discontinued in 2007.

== Format and contents ==
In its initial format, Muslimah measured 21 by 27.5 centimetres (8.3 in × 10.8 in). From January 2006 until the magazine's closure, it switched to a smaller format, 17 by 22.5 centimetres (6.7 in × 8.9 in). The language used was informal, with a high concentration of Indonesian slang.

Muslimah contained several regular columns, including editorial notes under the banner "Ahlan" as well as quizzes, profiles, film reviews, health, fashion, and cosmetics. It also included space for fiction, as well as Islamic teachings. A common topic of discussion was love, including not only romantic love, but also love for one's parents as well as for Muhammad and God. The magazine contained testimonials from Indonesian celebrities, with the February 2006 edition containing one by Zaskia Adya Mecca about her experiences as a party-loving celebrity before turning to God. It also covered literature, naming Habiburrahman El Shirazy's 2004 novel Verses of Love the best novel of the year in 2005.

Fashion was another common subject in Muslimah. Models presented diverse styles, including cute, ethnic, sporty, "Oriental", tomboyish, and traditional. Regardless of the style presented, however, the model was veiled. Articles in Muslimah presented veiling as part of individuals' personalized style, while also suggesting certain models and colours for persons with different facial shapes.

== Works cited ==
- Nef-Saluz, Claudia (2007). Islamic Pop Culture in Indonesia: An Anthropological Field Study on Veiling Practices among Students of Gadjah Mada University of Yogyakarta (PDF). Arbeitsblatt. Vol. 41. Bern: Bern University. ISBN 978-3-906465-41-8.
- Nisa, Airin; Reciana, Ken; Atmonobudi, Billy K. Sarwono (June 2007). "Youth Lifestyle in a Moslem Magazine: A Reception Analysis on 'Muslimah' Readers". MediaTor. 8 (1): 113–124. doi:10.29313/mediator.v8i1.1231.
- Setyowati, Hajar Nur (2008). "Muslimah: Bubye Muslimah" [Muslimah: Bye Bye Muslimah]. In Setyowati, Hajar Nur (ed.). Seabad Pers Perempuan: Bahasa Ibu, Bahasa Bangsa [A Century of Women's Press: Mother Tongue, National Language] (in Indonesian). Yogyakarta: I:boekoe. pp. 341–344. ISBN 978-979-1436-08-3.
- Widodo, Amrih (August–October 2008). "Writing for God: Piety and Consumption in Popular Islam". Inside Indonesia. 93. Archived from the original on 22 September 2008.
