= Pandji Pragiwaksono =

Indonesian stand-up comedian

- Born: Pandji Pragiwaksono Wongsoyudo; Singapore
- Education: Institut Teknologi Bandung
- Occupations: Rapper, radio broadcaster, comedian, presenter, actor, writer
- Years active: 2003–present

Pandji Pragiwaksono Wongsoyudo is an Indonesian stand-up comedian, actor, radio broadcaster, television presenter, book writer, and rap singer.

== Early life and education ==
Pandji was born in Singapore, and attended SMP Negeri 29 Jakarta (Jakarta 29 Public Junior High School). He is also an alumnus of Kolese Gonzaga, Jakarta.

He studied product design at the Design Department, Faculty of Fine Arts, ITB in 1997.

== Career ==
He began his career as a radio broadcaster at Hard Rock FM Bandung with Tike Priatnakusumah for two years until 2003, before moving to Jakarta and becoming a Hard Rock broadcaster in Jakarta for another three years. He was also known for his collaboration with Steny Agustaf.

He presented the reality show Kena Deh on Trans 7, which originally aired on ANTV in 2008. He also hosted movie review program Kok Bisa? and broadcast programs on NBA matches on Jak TV due to his interest in basketball.

=== Kolam Komik ===
Pandji is an illustrator and writer at KolamKomik.com, a comic publisher that he owns with Shani Budi Pandita. The comic, Degalings, is published every Wednesday. A special edition titled "H2O" was released in September 2011 at Plaza Indonesia.

=== Music ===
In 2009 he released his second album, You'll Never Know When Someone Comes in and Press Play On Your Paused Life.

On 21 May 2012, he launched his 4th hip hop album, Album 32, to coincide with the 14th anniversary of Soeharto's downfall. Songs including "Demokrasi Kita" and "Indonesia Free" contain speeches from Mohammad Hatta. Album 32 also features songs such as "GR" featuring Abenk Ranadireksa (Soulvibe), and "For Sahabatku" featuring Davinaraja (the Extralarge) which he wrote as a social critic.

=== Stand-up comedy ===
On 28 December 2011 he produced his own comedy show at the Usmar Ismail Theater, Bhinneka Tunggal Tawa.

He was also the originator of the idea of a competition Stand Up Comedy Indonesia (SUCI) on Kompas TV. After Kompas TV found his comedy videos on YouTube, Kompas TV invited him to be the host of the competition.

On 8 December he held a special performance under the name INDONESIA: (read: Indonesia colon), a combination of hip hop concerts, stand-up comedy, the launch of the book Berani Mengubah, and the launch of his fourth album, Album 32.

He started as a world tour in 2018 which originally began in Manila, taking in 13 cities, and including China, the Netherlands and Germany.

=== Politics ===
In 2016, he became the speaker for Anies Baswedan's campaign team for the 2017 Jakarta gubernatorial election.

== Comedy special ==
- Mens Rea (2025) – A Netflix stand-up comedy special that premiered with 10,000 live viewers in August 2025 and became a top-trending title on Netflix Indonesia. The special featured sharp political and social critique, including commentary on government figures and institutional corruption. The release sparked significant legal controversy, with six police reports filed regarding the content, citing provisions of Indonesia's Criminal Code on defamation and offenses against religion.

== Filmography ==
Notable films he has appeared in include:

- Dibalik 98 (2015) as Susilo Bambang Yudhoyono
- Rudy Habibie (2016) as Peter Manumasa
- Ayat-Ayat Cinta 2 (2017) as Hulusi
