= Verses of Love (film) =

- Theatrical release poster
- Indonesian: Ayat-Ayat Cinta
- Directed by: Hanung Bramantyo
- Written by: Habiburrahman El Shirazy; Retna Ginatri S. Noor; Salman Aristo
- Based on: Ayat-Ayat Cinta by Habiburrahman El Shirazy
- Produced by: Dhamoo Punjabi; Manoj Punjabi
- Starring: Fedi Nuril; Rianti Cartwright; Carissa Putri; Melanie Putria; Zaskia Adya Mecca
- Music by: Melly Goeslaw; Anto Hoed; Rossa; Tya Subiakto
- Production company: MD Pictures
- Distributed by: MD Entertainment
- Release date: February 28, 2008
- Running time: 120 minutes
- Country: Indonesia
- Languages: Indonesian; Arabic; English
- Budget: US$1.5 million
- Box office: US$13.00 million

Verses of Love (Indonesian: Ayat-Ayat Cinta) is an Indonesian romantic drama film directed by Hanung Bramantyo and produced by Manoj Punjabi and Dhamoo Punjabi. It features the ensemble cast that includes Fedi Nuril, Rianti Cartwright, Carissa Putri, Melanie Putria, and Zaskia Adya Mecca. It is a romantic religious drama based on the bestselling novel with the same title by Habiburrahman El Shirazy, who also wrote the film along with Salman Aristo and Retna Ginatri S. Noor. While the story is set in Cairo, Egypt, the film was shot in India and Semarang, Indonesia. Ayat-Ayat Cinta was released on February 28, 2008 in Indonesia, May 8, 2008 in Singapore, and June 19, 2008 in Malaysia.

Upon release, it was one of the most successful Indonesian films, and the first Indonesian film to reach 3.5 million tickets sold, which was only surpassed by Laskar Pelangi a few months later. Both films are the only films to surpass more than 3 million audiences before the 2010s. A sequel titled Ayat-Ayat Cinta 2, was released on December 21, 2017.

== Synopsis ==
The clever Fahri bin Abdillah goes on scholarship to Egypt to undertake study for a master's degree in Islam at Al-Azhar University, Cairo; his parents had to sell their rice field to help him as well.

Fahri has a plan for his life to be achieved through his perseverance and discipline. He plans to marry when his thesis is accepted. He has yet to have a close relationship with a woman beyond what he had with his mother and grandmother.

Maria Girgis is his first admirer: a Coptic Christian neighbour who, attracted to him for his knowledge of the Al Quran, admits it only in her diary.

The Indonesian student Nurul did not recognize her attraction to Fahri. Nurul, a daughter of a well-regarded Muslim cleric in Indonesia, made Fahri think himself unworthy.

The humble next-door Egyptian neighbor, Noura, had empathy for Fahri since he got a scholarship, but she romantically interpreted the feelings, and this led to an accusation of rape.

Aisha's beautiful eyes captured Fahri's heart, and in the metro, when Fahri defended Islam from being narrow-minded, Aisha fell in love with him. Before marriage, Fahri sought to satisfy the desire in his heart and follow his religious faith in pursuit of this relationship.

== Cast ==
- Fedi Nuril as Fahri
- Rianti Cartwright as Aisha
- Carissa Putri as Mariah Girgis
- Melanie Putria as Nurul
- Zaskia Adya Mecca as Noura

== Soundtrack ==
Verses of Love Soundtrack

Soundtrack album by various artists
- Released: 2008
- Genre: Soundtrack
- Length: 39:27

The film's title track Verses of Love was selected as the lead single from the album soundtrack to promote the film, and met with critical and commercial success. A music video was also made for the single.

1. "Ayat-Ayat Cinta" (Rossa) — 3:48
2. "Jalan Cinta" (Sherina) — 4:32
3. "Takdir Cinta" (Rossa) — 3:32
4. "Tercipta Untukku" (featuring Rossa) (Ungu) — 4:25
5. "Andai Ku Tahu" (Ungu) — 4:46
6. "Opening Scene" (Music Scoring) — 2:41
7. "Letter From Noura" (Music Scoring) — 1:18
8. "Thalagi" (Music Scoring) — 1:13
9. "The Basket" (Music Scoring) 1:06
10. "Ayat-Ayat Cinta" (Minus One) — 3:47
11. "Jalan Cinta" (Minus One) — 4:32
12. "Takdir Cinta" (Minus One) — 3:30

== Release ==
Ayat-Ayat Cinta was scheduled to be released on December 19, 2007, but it was delayed to February 28, 2008, for some reason.

== Comparison to novel ==
In the novel:

- Maria has a younger brother, Youssef; in the film she is an only child.
- Fahri is arrested and imprisoned on religious grounds by the respected scholars Professor Abdul Rauf, Ismail, Hamada, Haj Rashed and Marwan. In the film, Fahri is accused and imprisoned for being a cruel yet wise culprit.
- The American reporter Alicia returns to Egypt to visit Fahri, a recent Muslim convert; in the film she never converts.

== Sequel ==
During the screening of Rudy Habibie, a sequel to the film was confirmed. It is titled Ayat-Ayat Cinta 2, this time, it was directed by Guntur Soehardjanto, while Alim Sudio and Ifan Ismail writing the script. The film was released on December 21, 2017.
