= Andrea Hirata =

Indonesian author (born 1967)

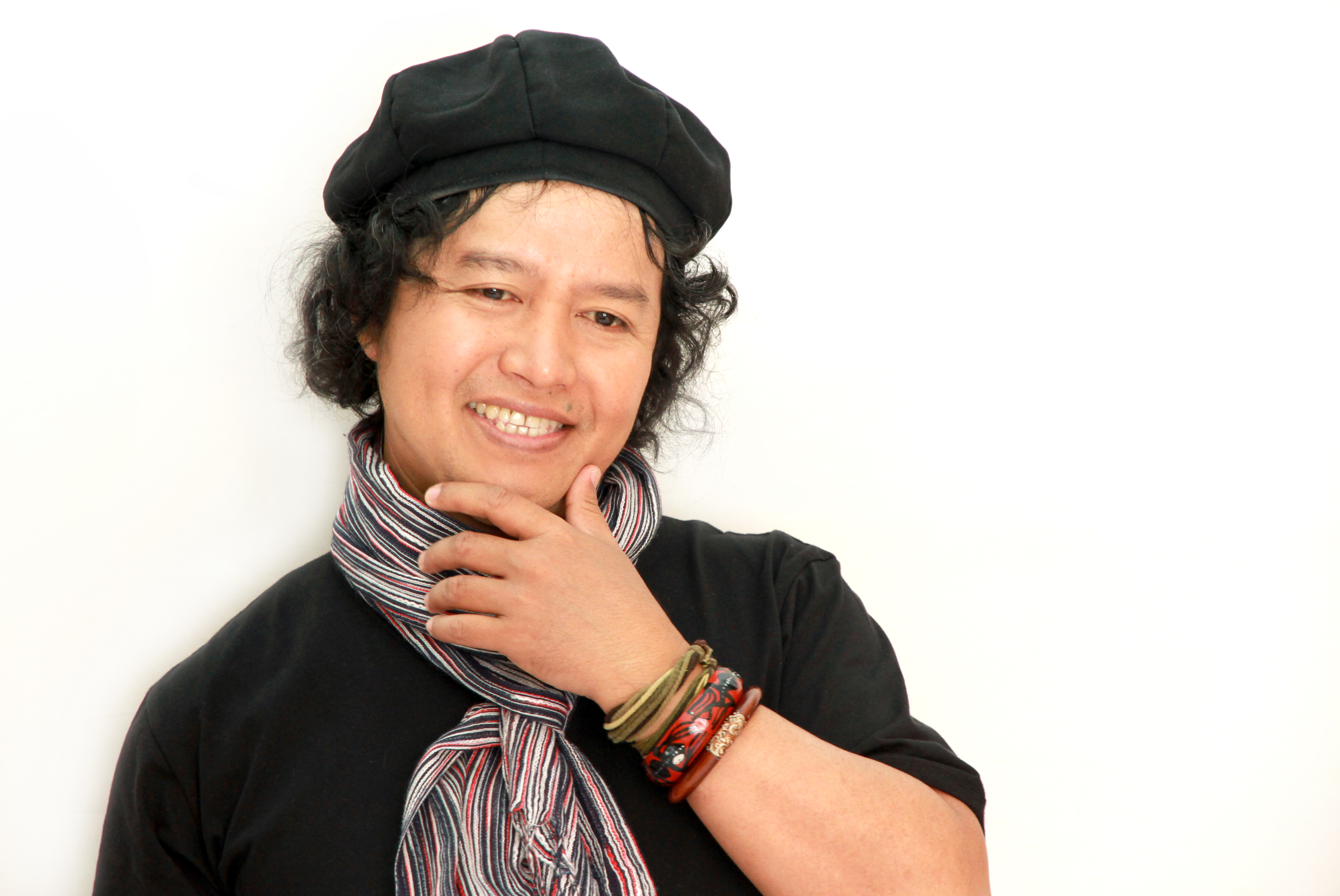
- Andrea Hirata in 2012
- Born: Andrea Hirata Seman Said Harun; October 24, 1966 (age 59); Gantung, Belitung Island, Indonesia
- Education: Universitas Indonesia (S1); Sheffield Hallam University (S2)
- Occupations: Writer, Novelist
- Writing career
- Language: Indonesian
- Genre: Nonfiction
- Notable work: Laskar Pelangi

Andrea Hirata Seman Said Harun or better known as Andrea Hirata is an Indonesian novelist who hails from Bangka Belitung islands. His first novel was Laskar Pelangi which spawned two sequels (previously three),

== Biography ==
Hirata was born in Gantung, Belitung. During the course of his youth, His parents changed his name seven times. The family eventually named him Andrea, with Hirata being given by his mother. He grew up in a poor family who lived not far from a government-owned tin mine operated by PN Timah (now PT Timah Tbk.).

Hirata started his higher education with a degree in economics from University of Indonesia. Although Andrea's major was economics, he is very fond of science—physics, chemistry, biology, astronomy and literature. After receiving a scholarship from one of European Union's programs, he took a master's program in Europe, first at the University of Paris, then at Sheffield Hallam University in the UK. Andrea's thesis in the field of telecommunications economics received an award from the university and he graduated cum laude. The thesis has been adapted into Indonesian and is the first telecommunications economic theory book written by an Indonesian. The book has been circulated as a scientific reference.

Andrea identifies himself more as an academic and backpacker. He is also pursuing his other dream of living in Kye Gompa, a village in the Himalayas.

Hirata released the novel Laskar Pelangi in 2005. The novel was written in six months based on his childhood experiences in Belitung. He later described the themes of the novel as an irony about the lack of access to education for children on one of the richest islands in the world. The novel sold five million copies, with pirated editions selling more than 15 million. The novel resulted in a two sequel of novels, namely Sang Pemimpi and Buku Besar Peminum Kopi

== Works ==
=== Laskar Pelangi Trilogy ===
- Laskar Pelangi (2005)
- Sang Pemimpi (2006) - revised in 2021, combined Sang Pemimpi and Edensor novels
- Buku Besar Peminum Kopi (2020) - combined Maryamah Karpov, Padang Bulan and Cinta di Dalam Gelas

=== Aini Series ===
- Orang-Orang Biasa (2019)
- Guru Aini (2020, prequel to Orang-Orang Biasa)

=== Circus Pohon Trilogy ===
- Sirkus Pohon (2017)

=== Other novels ===
- Sebelas Patriot (2011)
- Ayah (2015)
- Brianna and Bottomwise (2022)

=== Songbook ===
- Laskar Pelangi Song Book (2012)

== Achievements ==
- Winner of BuchAwards 2013
- 2013 New York Book Festival Winner (general fiction category)
- Honorary Doctor of Letters (Hon DLitt) from Warwick University 2015

== Awards and nominations ==
Year	Awards	Category	Results
2016	Indonesian Choice Awards	Digital Persona of the Year	Nominated
2018	Indonesian Choice Awards	Creative & Innovative Person of the Year	Nominated
