= Rianti Cartwright =

Indonesian actress, model, presenter and VJ

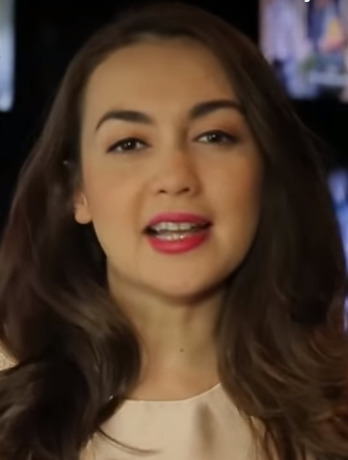
- Cartwright in 2017
- Born: Rianty Rhiannon Cartwright; 22 November 1983 (age 42); Bandung, West Java, Indonesia
- Other names: Rianti R. Cartwright; VJ Rianti; Sophia Rianti Rhiannon Cartwright
- Occupations: Actress, model, presenter
- Years active: 2003–present
- Spouse: Cas Alfonso (m. 2010)
- Partner: Banyu Biru Djarot (2001–2008)
- Children: 1
- Parent(s): Dachlan Cartwright (father); Srie Sutrisnawati (mother)
- Website: http://www.balebalespa.com/ https://twitter.com/Riantic

Rianti Rhiannon Cartwright (born 22 September 1983) is an Indonesian actress, model, presenter and VJ. She's best known for her leading role as 'Aisha' in a romantic religious Indonesian hit movie Ayat-Ayat Cinta (Verses of Love) in 2008 and became a VJ for MTV Indonesia since 2005.

== Early life ==
Cartwright was born in Bandung, West Java, to a Welsh father and a Sundanese mother. She has one older brother. Cartwright was born a Muslim and is trilingual (Indonesian, Sundanese and English). At the age of five, her family moved to the UK until her teens, when they moved back to Indonesia. She later attended Bandung International School (Now called Bandung Independent School). Cartwright graduated from University of Tasmania with a Bachelor of Commerce majoring in International Business and Marketing.

Cartwright has also been an editor for Maxx-M magazine, a local magazine in Bandung.

== Conversion to Roman Catholicism ==
On 17 September 2010, Rianti secretly married an ancient descendant man that are U.S. citizen and of Batak origin, Cassanova Alfonso, at Saint Patrick's Cathedral, New York City, United States. Two weeks before departure to the United States to get married, Rianti left the Muslim faith to become a baptized Catholic with the name Sophia Rianti Rhiannon Cartwright.

Cartwright and Nainggolan have one daughter: Cara Rose Kanaya, born on 25 July 2020.

== Career ==
Cartwright started her career at the age of 16 in modelling before she turned her attention to acting.

Cartwright had appeared in many films, including Eiffel I'm in Love, Jomblo, Pesan Dari Surga in 2006, and D'Bijis in 2007, along with famous Indonesian actors, Tora Sudiro and Indra Birowo.

Cartwright has been named as an ambassador for AIDS and campaigned towards the younger generation to stay away from the risk of getting contacted by the HIV virus.

She served as one of the Judges in the popular Indonesian television show "Indonesia Mencari Bakat", a talent show modeled after Britain's Got Talent.

She also runs her own spa and cafe business.

== Music video appearances ==
Year	Title	Artist
2005	"Bertahan di Sana"	Sheila on 7
2005	"Naluri Lelaki"	Samsons
2005	"Demi Waktu"	Ungu
2006	"Seperti yang dulu"	Ungu
2006	"Sandaran Hati"	Letto
2006	"Gadisku"	Ello
2007	"Jangan Sakiti Aku"	Radja
2010	"Menyesal"	6ixth Sense
2011	"Terlalu"	ST 12
2012	"Percayalah"	Base Jam
