= Ayat-Ayat Cinta 2 =

- Directed by: Guntur Soehardjanto
- Screenplay by: Alim Sudio; Ifan Ismail
- Based on: Ayat Ayat Cinta 2 by Habiburrahman El Shirazy
- Produced by: Manoj Punjabi; Dhamoo Punjabi
- Starring: Fedi Nuril; Tatjana Saphira; Chelsea Islan; Dewi Sandra; Nur Fazura; Jihane Almira Chedid; Pandji Pragiwaksono; Arie Untung; Bront Palarae; Dewi Irawan; Cole Gribble; Mathias Muchus; Millane Fernandez; Nino Fernandez; Dian Nitami; Melayu Nicole Hall; Syifa Hadju
- Edited by: Cesa David Luckmansyah
- Music by: Tya Subiakto
- Production company: MD Pictures
- Distributed by: MD Entertainment
- Release dates: 21 December 2017 (Indonesia); 11 January 2018 (Singapore, Malaysia, Brunei)
- Running time: 125 minutes
- Country: Indonesia
- Language: Indonesian
- Budget: Rp16 billion ($1.2 million)
- Box office: Rp104.8 billion ($7.8 million)

Ayat-Ayat Cinta 2 (English: Verses of Love 2) is the 2017 Indonesian religious drama film that was released on 21 December 2017 and directed by Guntur Soehardjanto, who previously won nine awards at the 2005 Indonesian Film Festival through his work Juli di Bulan Juni. It is a sequel from Ayat-Ayat Cinta (2008). The plot follows Fahri, who has become a professor in Edinburgh, Scotland. He lives well without Aisha, his wife, who has been missing for months when she served as a volunteer in the Gaza Strip. While waiting for news of his wife, he faces many problems, from romance to distress for being a Muslim in Europe, where Islamophobia is surging throughout the place.

The film received mixed and positive reviews from film critics and has been reached over 1 million tickets sold in five days upon release, and reached over 2.5 million in third weekend upon release. The film is crawling up to the fourth position of the Indonesian best-selling films of 2017.

== Plot ==
Fahri, now living in Edinburgh and working as a lecturer at the University of Edinburgh, lives in a quiet neighborhood together with Uncle and Hulusi, his Turkish household assistant. Fahri lost contact with Aisha, his wife, seven months ago, when Aisha started becoming a volunteer in the Gaza Strip. He recalls Aisha having had two miscarriages and finding herself restless till a friend’s invitation to help displaced children of Palestine created a renewed zest for life. He had given her his blessings to go to Palestine, but due to reasons not shown at first, Aisha had stopped contacting him. Friends and relatives alike tell him that she is gone.

Fahri is still waiting for her sorrowly. He tries to overcome his sadness by busying himself as a lecturer and a successful entrepreneur in the city. Fahri is also preoccupied with the presence of Misbah, his old friend, who wants to stay with him.

Fahri is often confronted with the problems of his various neighbors. There is a Jewish grandmother, Catarina, who is having problems with her stepson. There is also Keira McGills, a talented violinist who hates Fahri very much, considers him as terrorist who has caused the death of her father by a bomb in London.

Fahri tries to keep Aisha's trust to help people around. Fahri's good intentions often make misunderstanding and drag him into more complicated issues, endangering his life. Fahri's life becomes more complicated when Hulya, Aisha's cousin, grows up into a beautiful woman.

Hulya is cheerful and dynamic, showing her interest in Fahri. Hulya is willing to replace Aisha's role in Fahri's life. Fahri hesitates to open his heart to Hulya's presence because if he did, it would mean he admits that Aisha is dead. Fahri is still hoping, every night, that Aisha will re-emerge in his life. All supported Fahri to continue his life with Hulya, including Sabina, a disabled, faceless woman whom Fahri accommodated to stay with them. Sabina, who has been considered as a sister by Fahri, not only helps to take care of Fahri's house, but also is able to help Fahri continue his life.

== Cast ==
List of cast members obtained from IMDb.

- Fedi Nuril as Fahri bin Abdullah Shiddiq
- Tatjana Saphira as Hulya
- Chelsea Islan as Keira
- Dewi Sandra as Sabina/ Aisha
- Nur Fazura as Brenda
- Jihane Almira Chedid as Clara
- Pandji Pragiwaksono as Hulusi
- Bront Palarae as Baruch
- Dewi Irawan as Catarina
- Deborah Whyte as Janet
- Cole Gribble as Jason
- Arie K. Untung as Misbah
- Melayu Nicole Hall as Layla
- Nino Fernandez as Nicholas
- Millane Fernandez as Lynda
- Mathias Muchus as Paman "Fahri"
- Dian Nitami as Namira
- Syifa Hadju as Fatimah
- Paul Lapsley as Police officer

== Production ==
The film is directed by Guntur Soehardjanto. Screenwriter by Alim Sudio and Ifan Ismail, the story in this movie is again based on the story of the novel by Habiburrahman El Shirazy with the same title. Habiburrahman El Shirazy said that Ayat Ayat Cinta 2 is one of the most difficult novels he has ever written. The film was produced by Manoj Punjabi and Dhamoo Punjabi. The actor Fedi Nuril was asked again to play as Fahri, the lead actor in this film. The film is also starring Tatjana Saphira, Chelsea Islan, Dewi Sandra, Nur Fazura, Pandji Pragiwaksono and Arie Untung.

The reading process began in April. The filming process began on 5 August 2017 and took up to fifty days. The film was set in various places such as Gaza, Scotland, London, Budapest, and Jakarta. In an interview, producer Manoj did not mention the details of budget but he claimed this project is the biggest so far beyond the previous film, Surga Yang Tak Dirindukan 2 which previously claimed to spend Rp16 billion just for the production.

== Original soundtrack ==
The soundtrack album was released on 4 December 2017. The album was sung by various musicians from Indonesia, such as Krisdayanti, Rossa, Raisa, Isyana, and many more.

Ayat-Ayat Cinta 2 Original Soundtrack

Soundtrack album by Various artists
- Released: 4 December 2017
- Genre: Ballad; jazz; pop
- Length: 42:21
- Label: MD Music Indonesia
- Producer: Anto Hoed; Melly Goeslaw; Ari Renaldi; Marco Steffiano; Rayendra Sunito; Harry Budiman; Ryan Ho; Maraya Afina; Barry Maheswara

Singles from Ayat-Ayat Cinta 2 Original Soundtrack
- 1. "Masih Berharap" Released: 2 November 2017

Ayat-Ayat Cinta 2 (Original Soundtrack)
No.	Title	Lyrics	Music	Performer	Length
1.	"Bulan Di Kekang Malam" (Moon Restrained by the Night)	Melly Goeslaw	Goeslaw	Rossa	3:54
2.	"Ayat-Ayat Cinta 2" (Verses of Love 2)	Goeslaw	Goeslaw	Krisdayanti	4:53
3.	"Teduhnya Wanita" (Woman's Calm)	Raisa	Raisa; Marco Steffiano; Rayendra Sunito; Haris Pranowo	Raisa	4:17
4.	"Dua Cinta" (Two Loves)	Ryan Ho	Ryan Ho	Calvin Jeremy	3:48
5.	"Bersenyawa"	Dengarkan Dia	Dengarkan Dia	Dengarkan Dia	3:34
6.	"Bila Jodohku Kamu" (If You are My Destiny)	Harry Budiman	Budiman	Ryan Ho	4:05
7.	"Harapku" (My Hope)	Ryan Ho	Ryan Ho	Sarah Saputri	4:41
8.	"Kamu Tulang Rusukku" (You're My Rib Cage)	Yeshua	Yeshua; Mytha Lestari; EL	Yeshua	3:41
9.	"Cinta Bukan Milik Kita" (Love is not Ours)	Cassandra	Choki Simanjuntak of Cassandra	Cassandra	3:50
10.	"Diantara Pepohonan" (Among the Trees)	Is of Payung Teduh	Is of Payung Teduh	Payung Teduh	2:15
11.	"Masih Berharap" (Still Hoping)	Yovie Widianto	Widianto	Isyana Sarasvati	3:23
Total length:					42:21

== Accolades ==
Award	Date of ceremony	Category	Recipient(s)/Nominee(s)	Result	Ref.
Indonesian Box Office Movie Awards	23 March 2018	Best Actress in a Leading Role	Tatjana Saphira	Won	
Indonesian Box Office Movie Awards	23 March 2018	Best Director	Guntur Soeharjanto	Nominated	
Indonesian Box Office Movie Awards	23 March 2018	Best Movie Trailer	Ayat-Ayat Cinta 2	Nominated	
Indonesian Box Office Movie Awards	23 March 2018	Best Original Soundtrack	"Bulan Dikekang Malam" (by Rossa)	Nominated	
Indonesian Box Office Movie Awards	23 March 2018	Top 10 Box Office Movie of 2017	Ayat-Ayat Cinta 2	Won	
Indonesian Choice Awards	29 April 2018	Movie of the Year	Ayat-Ayat Cinta 2	Pending	
