= Cas Alfonso =

Indonesian R&B singer (born 1983)

- Born: Alfoncius Dapot Parulian Nainggolan; 23 May 1983 (age 42); Jakarta, Indonesia
- Other names: Casanova Alfonso
- Occupation(s): Singer-songwriter, composer,
- Years active: 2006–present
- Label: Independent Label
- Spouse: Rianti Cartwright (m. 2010)
- Children: 1

Alfoncius Dapot Parulian Nainggolan (born 23 May 1983) also known as Cas or Casanova Alfonso, is an Indonesian R&B singer.

== Career ==
R&B singer Cas, joined such other musicians as Manissedap, Sultan, Emil, Bembi, Rizki, and Wizzow in 2006 to produce a solo album by the end of 2009. The album contained 12 singles. He performed songs inspired by his love, Rianti Cartwright, such as "Mingle With You" and "You Got What I Need". On this album, he worked with such musicians as Dewi Sandra, Manissedap, and Davadrian.

== Marriage ==
He and Rianti Cartwright married on 17 September 2010 at Old St. Patrick's Cathedral, New York City. They announced an expected first child in February 2020; Cartwright gave birth to Cara Rose Kanaya, born on 25 July 2020.

== Discography ==
- Denganmu (With U; 2009)
- Yang Terbaik (The Best; 2010)

== See also ==
- Batak
