= Habiburrahman El Shirazy =

Indonesian Muslim author

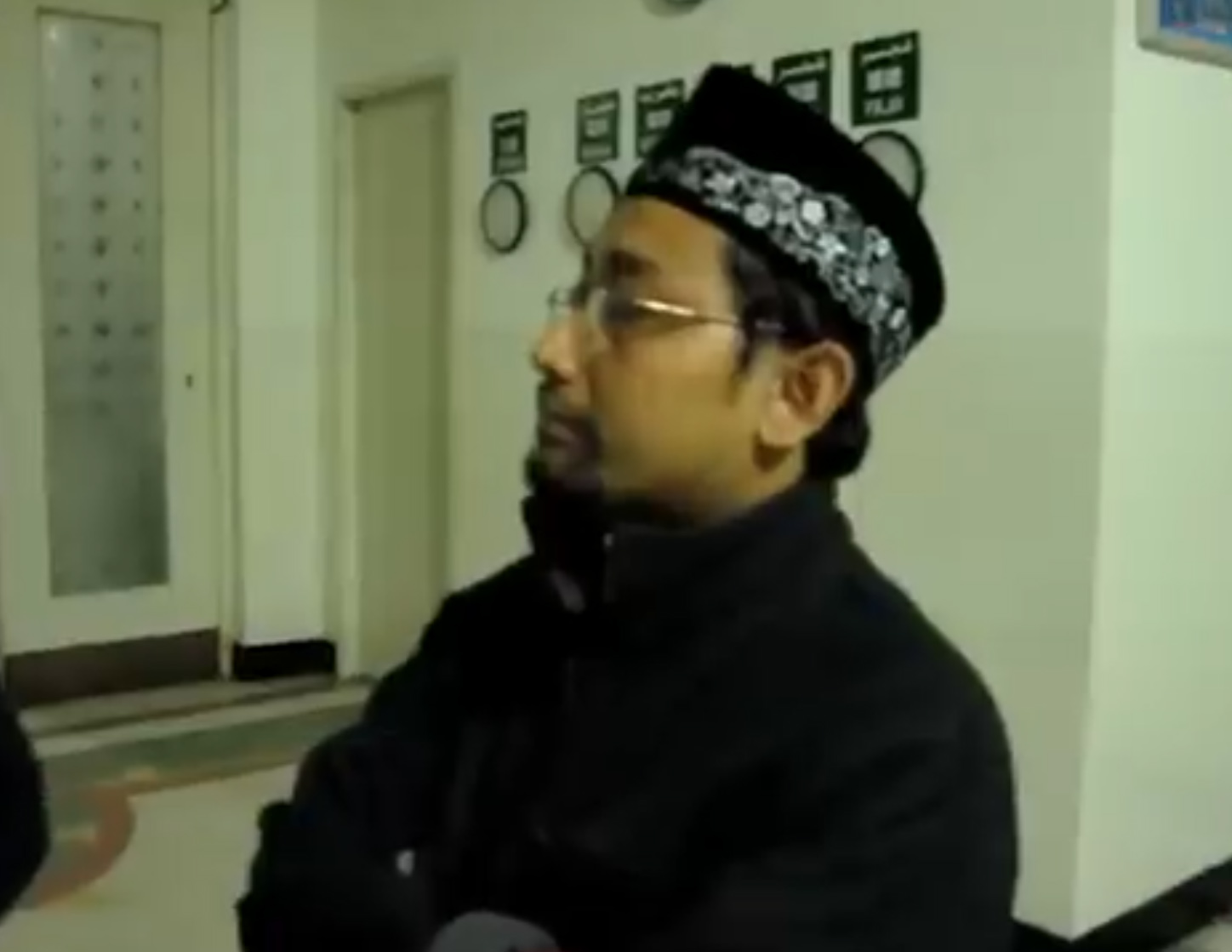
- El Shirazy in 2010
- Born: Habiburrahman El Shirazy; 30 September 1976 (age 49); Semarang, Central Java, Indonesia
- Writing career
- Language: Indonesian
- Years active: 2004–present
- Genres: Romance, drama, Islam
- Notable work: Ayat-Ayat Cinta (2004)
- Literary movement: Forum Lingkar Pena

Habiburrahman El Shirazy (born 30 September 1976), popularly known as Kang Abik, is an Indonesian author and da'i. Having attended Islamic schools from childhood, he studied hadiths at Al-Azhar University in Cairo, Egypt, where he became involved with the Indonesian literary community Forum Lingkar Pena. Returning to Indonesia in 2002, El Shirazy was injured in a motorcycle accident the following year. While recuperating, he wrote his debut novel Ayat-Ayat Cinta (Verses of Love, 2004), a commercial success that was soon adapted to film. While continuing to write fiction, El Shirazy used the proceeds from the novel to expand his dakwah (proselytization) activities. Several of El Shirazy's novels have been adapted to film, with Dalam Mihrab Cinta (In the Chamber of Love, 2010) being directed by the author.

== Biography ==
=== Early life and studies ===
El Shirazy was born on the outskirts of Semarang, Central Java, on 30 September 1976, the eldest of five children born to Saerozi Noor and Siti Rodhiyah. His father was a civil servant who also acted as a mubaligh (Qur'an reciter), while his mother operated a kindergarten. The family supplemented their income through farming and animal husbandry, with Siti Rodhiyah selling their vegetables.

Saerozi Noor emphasized the importance of Islamic obligations, and thus El Shirazy and his brothers Anif and Mujib studied Islam from their youth. El Shirazy's junior high school studies were conducted at the Tsanawiyah Futuhiyyah 1 madrasa in Demak, Central Java. After graduating in 1992, he continued his studies at a madrasa in Surakarta designed for gifted children. There, he began writing, producing the poem "Dzikir Dajjal" ("Dajjal's Dzikir") and heading a theatre group.

In 1995, after completing his studies in Surakarta, El Shirazy travelled to Cairo, Egypt, to enrol at Al-Azhar University. His family were unable to afford the entirety of the programme, and provided him only enough to cover his travel and first year of study. El Shirazy thus supported his studies by selling food. He completed a four-year programme in hadith studies at the Faculty of Theology. He continued this with a two-year postgraduate programme.

While in Cairo, El Shirazy became engaged with the Forum Lingkar Pena (FLP), an Indonesia-based writers' collective. Finding an advertisement for the collective in the magazine Annida, he submitted an application and received welcoming emails from the organization's founders Helvy Tiana Rosa and Asma Nadia some weeks later. In turn, El Shirazy helped establish the FLP's Cairo branch. He was also involved with a writers group known as the Indonesian Literary Community. He was also involved with the Indonesian Association of Muslim Intellectuals' Cairo branch, which he headed from 1998 to 2002. During his leadership, he edited and published several poetry anthologies produced by members of the association.

El Shirazy's literary output in Cairo included short stories and poems. His stage plays included the original works Wa Islam (1999) and Darah Syuhada (Blood of the Martyrs, 2000), as well as Sang Kyai dan Sang Durjana (The Islamic Scholar and the Wicket, 2000), an adaptation of a work by Yusuf al-Qaradawi. His short stories, meanwhile, were published in the magazine Annida and in the newspaper Republika.

=== Return to Indonesia and Ayat-Ayat Cinta ===
El Shirazy returned to Indonesia in 2002, becoming at teacher at State Madrasa 1 in Yogyakarta; he also began working on Pesantren Basmala, a religious and business education programme. In 2003, he was injured in a motorcycle accident, leaving him unable to work. While recuperating, he began work on his debut novel, Ayat-Ayat Cinta (Verses of Love), a story about a pious young Indonesian student in Cairo named Fahri who weds another Indonesian, Aisha, and guides a Coptic Christian named Maria to Islam. El Shirazy cited his inspiration for the novel as Verse 67 of Surah Az-Zukhruf, which he understood to mean that only love based in taqwa (piety and fear of God) will remain eternal even beyond Judgement Day. The title has also been read as a challenge to Salman Rushdie's The Satanic Verses (1988), something that El Shirazy rejects.

Ayat-Ayat Cinta, published by Republika in December 2004, was an immediate success. It was voted by the Islamic women's magazine Muslimah as Indonesia's favourite novel of 2005, outperforming the Harry Potter series, and within four years it had sold 400,000 copies and been reprinted 30 times. Commercial success was also reported in Brunei, Malaysia, and Singapore. It was popular mostly among pious Muslims and did not attract much interest among more secular readers: in 2008, the news portal Detik.com reported that most of the writers and critics that it had contacted had not read the novel, nor did they intend to.

A film adaptation, directed by Hanung Bramantyo, known for his romantic comedies, was released in 2008. This film and its soundtrack were likewise successful. The dual successes of this film and Syahadat Cinta (Love's Shahadah, 2008), adapted from a novel by Taufiqurrahman Al-Azizy, have been credited with stimulating the rise of a genre of Islamic Indonesian films. El Shirazy also gained increased recognition, though he was not incorporated into the Indonesian literary canon.

=== Later career ===
The popularity of Ayat-Ayat Cinta made El Shirazy famous in Indonesia, where he became popularly known as Kang Abik. He became a lecturer at the Muhammadiyah University of Surakarta, leaving in 2006. He also served on the central council of FLP, and later as a member of its advisory board. He was regularly invited to speak at events. With the proceeds from Ayat-Ayat Cinta, he also purchased property for Pesantren Basmala near the State University of Semarang. The programme expanded rapidly, and by 2011 it handled 1,000 students in 70 boarding houses.

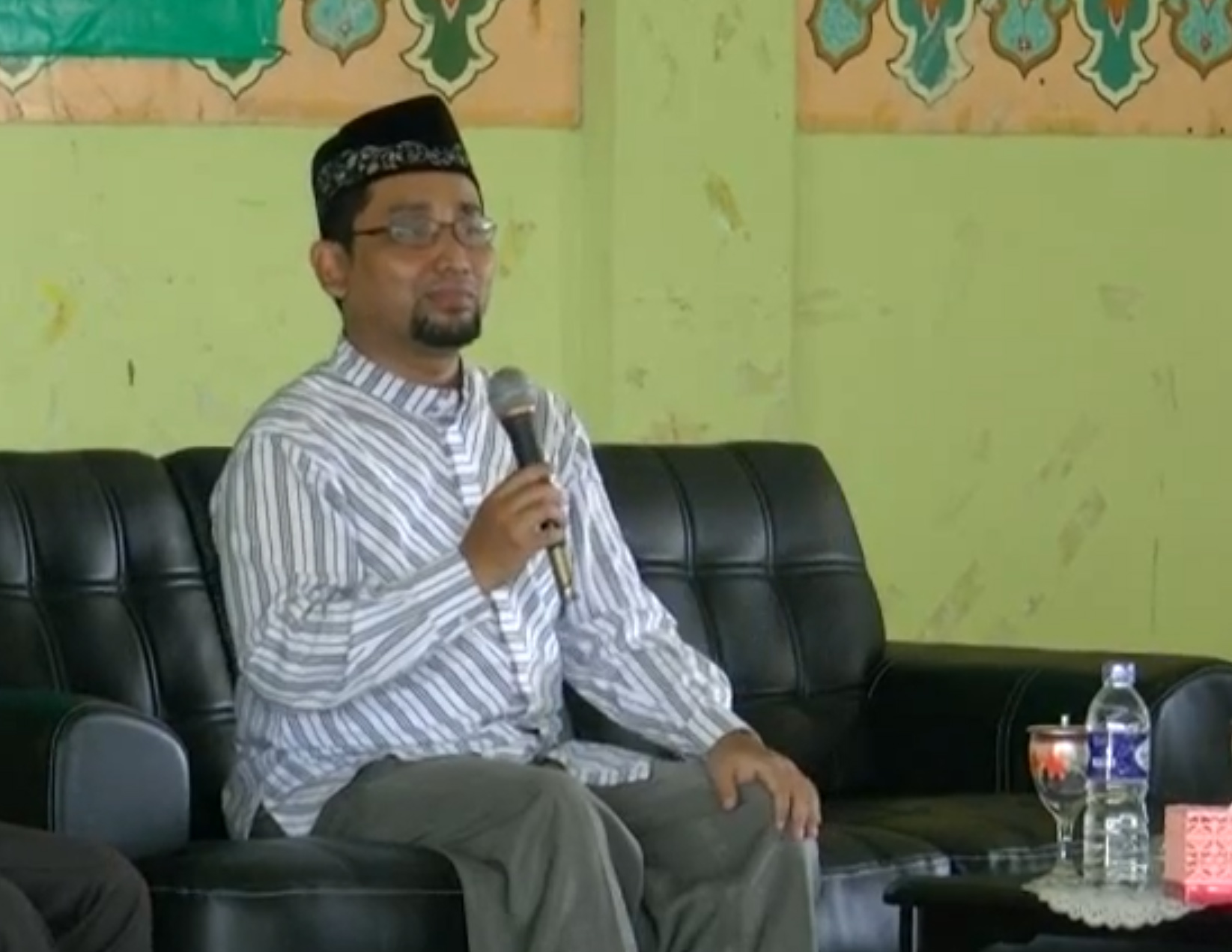
El Shirazy discussing his novel Cinta Suci Zahrana, 2012

Two more of El Shirazy's novels, Ketika Cinta Bertasbih (When Love Prays, 2007) and its sequel, were adapted to film by Chaerul Umam in 2009. Displeased with the adaptation of Ayat-Ayat Cinta, in which he was little involved, El Shirazy cast the film through open auditions involving some 7,000 candidates. These auditions had a dual focus: identifying new talent, and ensuring that cast members embodied Islamic values. El Shirazy appeared in the film as Ustad Mujab. In 2010, El Shirazy directed an adaptation of his 2007 novel Dalam Mihrab Cinta (In the Chamber of Love). Starring Dude Harlino and Asmirandah, the film followed a young santri (student of Islam) who falls into crime after he is wrongfully ejected from his school before repenting and becoming a famed Islamic scholar. These films were produced by SinemArt.

Another novel, Cinta Suci Zahrana (Zahrana's Pure Love) was launched in 2011 through a roadshow on Indonesian university campuses. Narrating the story of a young woman whose parents worry about spinsterhood after she focuses on her education, the novel was intended to highlight the difficulties faced by educated Muslim women in finding a husband. Cinta Suci Zahrana was adapted to film by Chaerul Umam the following year. In 2015, El Shirazy published Ayat-Ayat Cinta 2. The novel continues the story of its predecessor, with Fahri having moved to Scotland to teach and run a business; Aisha, meanwhile, has disappeared during a trip to Palestine. Speaking with Antara, he described the sequel as difficult to write due to the high expectations of readers and viewers as well as the strong demand for a sequel. The film adaptation of this novel, directed by Guntur Soeharjanto, was released on 21 December 2017. Within three weeks it had sold 2.5 million tickets.

The streaming service Viu acquired the rights to El Shirazy's novel Bidadari Bermata Bening (Angel with Clear Eyes, 2017), to be adapted for Ramadan 2023. In 2025, El Shirazy's novel Setetes Embun Cinta Niyala (A Dewdrop of Niyala's Love, 2005) was adapted to film with the English-language title Promised Hearts. Directed by Anggy Umbara, the film starred Beby Tsabina as a young doctor who is forced into an arranged marriage to resolve her family's debts. It was released on Netflix.

== Analysis ==
El Shirazy has become known for dakwah (proselytization), an activity he has undertaken based on a belief that Muslims have a duty to teach other Muslims to become better adherents of their religion. Consequently, his novels frequently include references to the Qur'an and the hadiths, as well as particular interpretations of these references, in exploring the moral foundation of protagonists' decisions. Amrih Widodo of Inside Indonesia characterizes Ayat-Ayat Cinta as containing Islamic teachings translated into "ordinary language applicable to real cases encountered in everyday life." In his novels, El Shirazy generally portrays young Muslim students. They are presented as finding success in academia or in entrepreneurship. Love is frequently presented in his novels. Protagonists find their spouses not through dating, but rather through limited interactions, with physical intimacy coming only after marriage.

== Works cited ==
- Ardiyati, Aan Putri; Ismayawati, Geisha Riani; Zulfaturrohmah, Kaila; Meliasanti, Ferina (2025). "Ekranisasi Novel Setetes Embun Cinta Niyala Karya Habiburrahman El Shirazy ke dalam Bentuk Film Setetes Embun Cinta Niyala Sutradara Anggy Umbara (Kajian Sastra Bandingan)" [The Adaptation of the Novel Setetes Embun Cinta Niyala by Habiburrahman El Shirazy into the Film Setetes Embun Cinta Niyala by Anggy Umbara (A Comparative Study)]. Kolase. 4 (2): 66–83. doi:10.35706/jk.v4i2.13175.
- Eliyanah, Evi (2024). "Gendered Moralities and Cinematic Representations of Indonesian Muslims and their Arab Others". Asian Studies Review. 48 (1): 19–35. doi:10.1080/10357823.2022.2119548.
- "Filmografi Habiburrahman El Shirazy" [Filmography of Habiburrahman El Shirazy]. filmindonesia.or.id (in Indonesian). Konfiden Foundation. Archived from the original on 6 March 2026.
- Hermawan, Ary (4 April 2008). "Habiburrahman El Shirazy: No Intentions to Counter 'Satanic Verses'". The Jakarta Post. Jakarta. Archived from the original on 9 June 2024.
- Hoesterey, James B. (2012). "Film Islami: Gender, Piety and Pop Culture in Post-Authoritarian Indonesia". Asian Studies Review. 36 (2): 207–226. doi:10.1080/10357823.2012.685925.
- Isnaini, Eveline (30 March 2025). "Indonesian Islamic Drama 'Promised Hearts' Premieres on Eid al Fitr - About Netflix". Netflix. Archived from the original on 6 March 2026.
- Kailani, Najib (2012). "Forum Lingkar Pena and Muslim Youth in Contemporary Indonesia". Review of Indonesian and Malaysian Affairs. 46 (1): 33–53.
- Kristanti, Livia (27 June 2022). "Viu Siapkan Seri Original Adaptasi Novel 'Bidadari Bermata Bening'" [Viu Prepares Original Series Based on the Novel 'Bidadari Bermata Bening'] (in Indonesian). Antara. Archived from the original on 5 July 2022.
- "Ayu Utami: Ayat-Ayat Cinta Pengecut" [Ayu Utami: Verses of Love Is Cowardly]. Detik.com (in Indonesian). 23 March 2008. Archived from the original on 16 March 2026.
- Kusumaryati, Veronika (27 December 2010). "'Dalam Mihrab Cinta': 57 Tangisan dalam Satu Setengah Jam" ['Dalam Mihrab Cinta': 57 Cries in an Hour and a Half]. Detik.com (in Indonesian). Archived from the original on 6 March 2026.
- Nancy, Yonada (20 February 2022). "Sinopsis Novel Ayat-Ayat Cinta 2 Karya Habiburrahman El-Shirazy" [Synopsis of the Novel Ayat-Ayat Cinta 2 by Habiburrahman El-Shirazy]. Tirto.id. Archived from the original on 6 March 2026.
- Rani, Mohd. Zariat Abdul (2012). "Islam, Romance and Popular Taste in Indonesia". Indonesia and the Malay World. 40 (116): 59–73. doi:10.1080/13639811.2011.648998.
- Rokhman, Muh Arif (2022). Indonesian Islamic Fiction in the 21st Century: Representations of the Other in the Works of Forum Lingkar Pena. Yogyakarta: UAD Press. ISBN 978-623-5635-17-0.
- Sakai, Minako (2012). "Preaching to Muslim Youth in Indonesia: The Dakwah Activities of Habiburrahman El Shirazy". Review of Indonesian and Malaysian Affair. 46 (1): 9–31.
- Sakai, Minako (2022). "Predicaments of Unmarried Career Women". In Sakai, Minako; Fauzia, Amelia (eds.). Women Entrepreneurs and Business Empowerment in Muslim Countries. Springer. pp. 131–168. ISBN 978-3-031-05954-4.
- Santosa, Lia Wanadriani (8 March 2017). "Alasan Habiburrahman El Shirazy Berat Selesaikan Ayat-Ayat Cinta 2" [The Reason Habiburrahman El Shirazy Had Difficulty Finishing Ayat-Ayat Cinta 2] (in Indonesian). Antara. Archived from the original on 11 June 2019.
- Widodo, Amrih (August–October 2008). "Writing for God: Piety and Consumption in Popular Islam". Inside Indonesia. 93. Archived from the original on 22 September 2008.
- Wirastama, Purba (9 January 2018). "Ayat-Ayat Cinta 2 Tembus 2,5 Juta Penonton" [Ayat-Ayat Cinta 2 Reaches 2.5 Million Viewers]. Metro TV. Archived from the original on 28 January 2018.
- Yuniar, Nanien (8 December 2017). "Ayat-Ayat Cinta 2 Sebarkan Pesan Perdamaian" [Ayat-Ayat Cinta 2 Spreads Message of Peace] (in Indonesian). Antara. Archived from the original on 28 January 2018.
