= Laskar Pelangi =

Film by Riri Reza

- Theatrical release poster
- Directed by: Riri Riza
- Written by: Salman Aristo; Mira Lesmana; Riri Riza
- Based on: The Rainbow Troops by Andrea Hirata
- Produced by: Mira Lesmana
- Starring: Cut Mini; Ikranagara; Tora Sudiro; Slamet Rahardjo; Teuku Rifnu Wikana
- Cinematography: Yadi Sugandi
- Music by: Sri Aksan Sjuman; Titi Handayani Sjuman
- Distributed by: Miles Films; Mizan Production
- Release date: September 25, 2008
- Running time: 124 minutes
- Country: Indonesia
- Languages: Indonesian; Belitung Malay
- Budget: ID Rp. 8 billion (US$ 890,000; ~ US$ 1,000,000 in 2017 accounting for inflation)
- Box office: $16.67 million

Laskar Pelangi (English: The Rainbow Troops) is a 2008 Indonesian drama film adapted from the novel of the same name by Andrea Hirata. The film follows a group of 10 students and their two inspirational teachers as they struggle with poverty and develop hopes for the future in Gantong Village, located in Belitung. The film became a box office and critical success, becoming one of the highest-grossing in Indonesian box office history receiving a number of local and international awards.

== Plot ==
Belitung is known for its richness in tin, making it one of Indonesia's richest islands, though bureaucracy turns most of the natives poor and some unemployed; most men end up working at the state-owned tin company PN Timah (id). Children of poor households are stereotyped as having no future and will end up working there.

In 1974, SD Muhammadiyah Gantong, taught by Muslimah Harfan and Bakri, awaits ten students as required by law. The school is small and underfunded, resulting in a lack of students for a long time. The first student is Lintang, a boy living in the coastal area whose father is a fisherman, leaving him unschooled. Soon, more join: Ikal, Mahar, Sahara, A Kiong, Borek, Kucai, Syahdan, Trapani, and Harun. One day, five years later, they see a rainbow forming, and Muslimah dubs the students "Laskar Pelangi" ("The Rainbow Troops"). As a Muslim school, Harfan teaches them perseverance and humbleness. Zulkarnaen, Muhammadiyah's assistant, expresses doubt over its legacy after the students reach their sixth grade, but Harfan says it is the only school around that does not prioritize grades; such schools have a higher success rate.

Mahmud, a teacher at SD PN Timah, has unrequited love for Muslimah and frequently asks her to join his school while belittling hers; Muslimah always rejects. During the after-exam holiday, the boys meet Flo, an SD PN student who gives Mahar one of her National Geographic collections featuring the Asmat people. Mahar, skillful in art, is assigned by Muslimah to form an idea for the Independence Day carnival competition, and he proposes an Asmat-style dance; they won first place. Flo decides to join Muhammadiyah, but she distracts the students from their grades. Meanwhile, Bakri reveals that he accepted an offer to teach at Bangka State School.

Unwilling to care for his health, Harfan dies. Grieving, Muslimah does not teach for five days, unannounced. The students continue to learn by themselves and keep pushing each other to study, warming Muslimah's heart and bringing her back to teaching. Some time later, a Gantong scholastic tournament is announced; Mahar, Ikal, and Lintang participate. They win, but on that day, too, Lintang's father dies. Obligated to take care of his two siblings, he reluctantly announces his leave to friends and teachers.

Belitung, heavily reliant on its tin industry, was severely affected by the 1980 tin crisis, and PN Timah went bankrupt. Ikal visits his home in 1999 and meets Lintang, who now has a wife and daughter. Ikal reveals that he received a scholarship at Sorbonne in Paris, which is his dream city, as caused by former love interest, A Ling, who is A Kiong's cousin. Meanwhile, Mahar is a novelist. The film ends with a quote from Article 31 of the Constitution of Indonesia: "Every citizen has the right to get proper education."

== Background and impact ==
The film reportedly cost 8 billion rupiah (US$890,000; ~ US$1,000,000 in 2017, accounting for inflation) to make and was a year in production. Most of the child actors in the film are from Belitung, and Producer Mira Lesmana explained that choice by saying: "In my opinion, there won't be any actors with a deeper connection to the roles than those who were born and lived in Belitong their entire life."

The Bangka Belitung provincial government declared some of the locations used in the film as areas of importance to culture and tourism in 2010, and provincial tourism chief Yan Megawandi said the decision was "primarily" made to help raise funds for the Muhammadiyah elementary school on which the film and novel's story are centered.

The film's local and international success fueled a tourism boom on Belitung, with Indonesian airline Garuda Indonesia reopening direct service from Jakarta to Tanjung Pandan, Belitung's capital. A provincial government official that month said he had no hard data on the increase in tourist arrivals as a result of the film, but said that nearly all seats on flights to the island from Jakarta were booked in the first week it was open and that most arrivals were asking about information on how to visit the film's locations.

A Belitung-based local newspaper Pos Belitung refers to the movie title in its motto, "Spirit Baru Negeri Laskar Pelangi" (New Spirit of the Land of Rainbow Troops).

== Awards ==
- Best Film, Bandung Film Festival, 2009
- Best Film, Indonesian Film Festival, 2009
- Nomination for Best Film and Best Editor, Asian Film Awards, 2009
- SIGNIS Award, Hong Kong International Film Festival, 2009
- Golden Butterfly Award, 23rd International Festival of Film for Children and Young Adults, Iran, 2009
- 3rd Place Audience Award, 11th Udine Far East International Film Festival, Italy, 2009

== See also ==
- Lascar
- Lascar (novel)
