= Inside Indonesia =

Australian journal about Indonesia

Inside Indonesia is an Australian-based journal, that has evolved into an online journal about Indonesia.

It was very similar to Tapol Bulletin in that it was created during the New order era, and many people

wanted to provide information about the growing numbers of people and organisations in Indonesia who were involved in attempts to bring about social and political change amidst the very repressive conditions at that time under the Suharto regime.

It evolved from a group of Melbourne-based activists and academics who perceived Australian media's misinformation and continued lack of coverage of Indonesia affairs. The group were known when they started in 1983 as the Indonesian Resources and Information Program (IRIP).

The magazine was published until 2007 - at that stage it became an online production only. As of June 2010 it has reached edition 100.
