= Tajwid Cinta =

Indonesian drama television series

- Genre: Romance; Religious; Melodrama
- Created by: Sridhar Jetty
- Screenplay by: Serena Luna
- Story by: Sunjoy Shekhar
- Directed by: Sanjeev Ram Kishan; Yoyo Dumpring (Episode 1-7)
- Starring: Cut Syifa; Harris Vriza; Afifah Ifah'nda; Faradilla Yoshi; Lavicky Nicholas; Sandro Karamoy
- Theme music composer: Ippo Hafiz
- Opening theme: "Aku Bidadari Surgamu" by Siti Nurhaliza
- Ending theme: "Aku Bidadari Surgamu" by Siti Nurhaliza
- Composer: Lucia Ren
- Country of origin: Indonesia
- Original language: Indonesian
- No. of seasons: 1
- No. of episodes: 241

Production
- Executive producer: David S. Suwarto
- Producer: Sridhar Jetty
- Cinematography: Zeta Alfa Maphilindo; Parjo; Wiwit
- Editors: Ramz; IO ™️; Naldz
- Camera setup: Multi-camera
- Running time: 25-38 minutes
- Production companies: SinemArt; Ess Jay Studios

Original release
- Network: SCTV; Vidio
- Release: 7 November 2022 – 14 July 2023

Tajwid Cinta is an Indonesian television drama series that premiered on 7 November 2022 on SCTV. Produced by Sridhar Jetty under the banner of Ess Jay Studios, it stars Cut Syifa, Harris Vriza and Afifah Ifah'nda. The show ended on 14 July 2023 and was replaced by Satu Cinta Dua Hati.

== Plot ==
Dafri has just returned to Indonesia to meet Alina to get engaged. However, the engagement was hampered because Nadia did not like Dafri's relationship with her daughter, Alina. Nadia deliberately sent Dafri to study in Turkey so that Dafri would be away from her daughter. Besides that, Dafri was asked by his father to marry Syifa, a woman he met for the first time. At that time, Syifa failed to get married because her future husband, Ilham, suddenly disappeared.

After marrying Dafri, Syifa and her husband lived in Jakarta.

== Cast ==
- Cut Syifa as Syifa Qadira Tanaya
- Harris Vriza as Dafri Abiyan Rafa
- Afifah Ifah'nda as Alina Nadine Putri Rahmad
- Faradilla Yoshi as Kayla
- Lavicky Nicholas as Ilham Adi Saputra
- Helsi Herlinda as Dewi
- Indra Brotolaras as Andre
- Anwar Fuady as Rahmad
- Ayu Dyah Pasha as Nadia
- Yanah as Inah
- Anton Qubro as Narto
- Giovanni Tobing as Arman
- Shandy Ishabella as Mella
- Joshua Pandelaki as Rizky Setiawan
- Debby Cynthia Dewi as Indri Lestari
- Yuzar Nazaros as Usman
- Tengku Ressi as Resti
- Aura Nabilla Izzathi as Farah
- Cut Yanthi as Wahida
- Fero Walandouw as Oki
- Meriam Bellina as Veronica
- Ciara Nadine Brosnan as Mischa
- Syahnaz Sadiqah as Safira
- Vicky Kalea as Deri
- Willy Dozan as Eros
- Cassandra Lee as Cahaya Faizal
- Antonio Blanco Jr as Fico
- Sandro Karamoy as Candra
- Sani Fahreza as Reynold
- Rexy Rizky as Nathan
- Rizal Akbar as Devin
- Sylvia Fully as Sarah
- Atalarik Syach as Herman
- Dewi Rezer as Mariani
- Meisya Amira as Bella
- Cahaya Dewi as Dilla
- Raditz Kazama as Usman
- Aisyah Fitdiyah as Nadia
- Robert Yuhendra as Rahmad

== Productions ==
=== Casting ===
In May 2023, Faradilla Yoshi were signed as Kayla. In the same month, Indra Brotolaras to join the show as Andre. In June 2023, Syahnaz Sadiqah quit the show.

== Awards and nominations ==
Year	Award	Category	Recipient	Result	Ref.
2023	Indonesian Television Awards	Most Popular None-Primetime Drama Programs	Tajwid Cinta	Nominated	
