= Betharia Sonata =

Indonesian singer

- Born: Sri Betharia Sonatha; 14 December 1962 (age 63); Bandung, West Java, Indonesia
- Occupations: Singer; Actress
- Spouses: Willy Dozan (m. 1990; div. 2002) unknown (m. 2003; div. 2005)
- Musical career
- Genres: Pop; Ballad
- Years active: 1981–present
- Label: Musica Studios

Sri Betharia Sonatha, better known as Betharia Sonata or Betha (born 14 December 1962), is an Indonesian singer and actress.

== Early life ==
Sri Betharia Sonatha was born on 14 December 1962, the fourth of nine children. Her father is of Minang and Sundanese ancestry, while her mother is of Batak ancestry though her maternal grandfather, of Ambonese ancestry through her maternal great-grandfather, and of Dutch ancestry through her maternal great-grandmother.

== Career ==
Sonata began her music career in 1981 with the release of her debut album Kau Tercipta Untukku. Her major breakthrough came in 1987 with the album Hati Yang Luka. The title song became a national hit and earned her the Golden Kaset HDX award.

She later released many albums, including Seandainya (1995), Memoriku Di Karaoke (1997), Best of Betharia Sonatha Karaoke (1999), Melayu Deli Betharia Sonatha (1999) and Platinum 22 Best Of Betharia Sonatha Vol. 002 (2003). Over her career, she released more than 30 solo albums and received seven Golden Record awards.

Sonata appeared in films such as Kamus Cinta Sang Primadona and Biarkan Aku Cemburu. She also acted in television films and soap operas, including the FTV series "Pak De" (2007) with Didi Petet.

== Personal life ==
Sonata married action film actor Willy Dozan in 1990. Their marriage ended in divorce in August 2002 following a court decision. The couple has two children. After the divorce, custody of one child was granted to each parent.

In 2005, Sonata stated that she had entered a religious marriage that was not registered under Indonesian civil law. She explained that the marriage was conducted according to religious norms and chose not to publicly disclose her husband's identity. According to her own statement, the couple lived separately by agreement. The marriage later ended in 2005.

== Filmography ==
=== Films ===
Acting roles
Year	Title	Role	Notes
1988	Biarkan Aku Cemburu	Unique	
1988	Kamus Cinta Sang Primadona		

=== Soap operas ===
- Nyah Cemplon
- Pintu Hidayah

=== FTV ===
- Pak De (2007)
- Dewi Bunga (2020)

== Discography ==
- Kau Tercipta Untukku (1981)
- Pop Minang Vol. I (1981)
- Pop Minang Vol. II (1981)
- Kau untuk Siapa (1982)
- Lagu Pop Indonesia Vol. III (1982)
- Aku Ingin Cinta yang Nyata (1983)
- Kau Sungguh Kejam (1984)
- Butet (1984)
- Pop Minang Vol. III (1984)
- Ito Haholongan (1984)
- Hati Seorang Wanita (1985)
- Pop Jazz Ambon (1985)
- Dia Madu Cintaku (1985)
- Yang Selalu Kusayang (1986)
- Hati yang Luka (1987)
- Langgam Romantika (1988)
- Pilih yang Mana (1988)
- Tinggal Mimpi (1988)
- Bossanova Serie 1 (bersama Ireng Maulana, 1988)
- Kau Salah Sebut Namaku (1990)
- Jangan Ingin Menang Sendiri (1990)
- Tasingot Au Inang (1990)
- Biar Ku Sendiri (1991)
- Biarkanlah Dia Pergi (1991)
- Si Buyuang Kini Lah Gadang (1993)
- Satu Tanda Tangan (1993)
- Nasib Si Bari-Bari (1993)
- Sami Sami (1993)
- Tak Mungkin Lagi (1994)
- Seandainya (1995)
- Uda Zainuddin (1995)
- Memoriku di Karaoke (1997)
- Nostalgia (1997)
- Nostalgia Dendang Melayu Terpopuler (1997)
- Nostalgia 2 (1998)
