= Cinta di Bawah Tangan =

2025 Indonesian television series

- Genre: Drama; Romance
- Screenplay by: Maretta Abadi
- Story by: Maretta Abadi
- Directed by: Indrayanto Kurniawan
- Starring: Febby Rastanty; Harris Vriza; Michella Putri; Bara Valentino; Adly Fairuz; Helsi Herlinda
- Theme music composer: Giring, Andro, Randy, Ariel
- Opening theme: "Sumpah dan Cinta Matiku" by Nidji
- Ending theme: "Sumpah dan Cinta Matiku" by Nidji
- Composer: Muhammad Raju
- Country of origin: Indonesia
- Original language: Indonesian
- No. of seasons: 1
- No. of episodes: 69

Production
- Executive producer: David S. Suwarto
- Producer: Sridhar Jetty
- Cinematography: Zeta Alfa Maphilindo
- Editor: Essjay Team
- Camera setup: Multi-camera
- Running time: ±85 minutes
- Production companies: SinemArt; Ess Jay Studios

Original release
- Network: SCTV
- Release: August 2 – October 15, 2025

Cinta di Bawah Tangan is an Indonesian television series that premiered on August 2, 2025 at 20.05 WIB on SCTV. This series is directed by Indrayanto Kurniawan and stars Febby Rastanty, Harris Vriza, and Michella Putri.

== Synopsis ==
Hana just came home from studying abroad. Suddenly, Ira—his mother—asked him to look for Alfin because Hardi was in critical condition. Previously, Alfin had run away from home with Kinan. Kinan is the daughter of Yudha, Hardi's old enemy. This sparked conflict between their families.

Hana finally went with Tian, her boyfriend, to East Kalimantan to look for Alfin's whereabouts. In the middle of the journey, they had an accident. After the accident, Hana and Tian decided to rest in the cave. Unfortunately, they were accused of indecency by the locals, and they were forced to marry immediately.

Unexpectedly, when the two of them were taken to the village hall, they met Alfin. Hana and Alfin's meeting was filled with emotion. Even though he was sure that his sister was innocent, Alfin still chose to marry Hana to Tian. Alfin did this to respect local village customs.

== Cast ==
- Febby Rastanty as Anindya Hana Kartika
- Harris Vriza as Tian Ganindra
- Michella Putri as Misandra Lamore
- Bara Valentino as Nathan
- Adly Fairuz as Alfin
- Firstriana Aldila as Kinan
- Helsi Herlinda as Miranti
- Faradilla Yoshi as Tasya
- Windy Wulandari as Ira
- Umar Lubis as Hardi Utama
- Marcelino Lefrandt as Bharatayudha
- Shinta Bachir as Meli
- Zikri Daulay as Vano
- Anwar Fuady as Robby Lamore
- Gilang Ramadhan as Burhan
- Raditz Kazama as Bimo
- Rika Fransiska as Jihan (uncredited)
- Dianda Sabrina as Raya (uncredited)
- Alita Kalie as Reyhana (uncredited)
- Arsenio Rafisqy as Kenzie (uncredited)
