= Nia Ramadhani =

Indonesian actress

- Born: Prianti Nur Ramadhani; April 16, 1990 (age 36); Jakarta, Indonesia
- Occupation: Celebrity
- Years active: 1995 - present
- Spouse: Anindra Ardiansyah Bakrie (m. 2010)
- Children: 3
- Relatives: Aburizal Bakrie (father-in-law)

Ramadhania Ardiansyah Bakrie (born Prianti Nur Ramadhani; born 16 April 1990), known professionally as Nia Ramadhani, is an Indonesian actress.

== Career ==
Nia Ramadhani entered the entertainment industry as a dancer in 1995. She started acting in 2004, when she had a lead role in Bawang Merah Bawang Putih alongside Dimaz Andrean and Revalina S. Temat. By 2007 she had appeared in more than 10 soap operas and also in films. In 2007 she appeared in the horror film Suster Ngesot, directed by Arie Aziz. In 2008, she appeared in the horror film Hantu Jembatan Ancol. The same year, she starred in Kesurupan.

She took a break from acting shortly after her marriage in 2010, but after the birth of her first child in 2012, had a lead role in the 2013 TV drama series Putri Nomer Satu, returning again in 2018.

== Personal life ==
On 1 April 2010, she married Anindra Ardiansyah Bakrie, the son of Indonesian politician and entrepreneur Aburizal Bakrie. They have three children.

She and her husband were arrested in July 2021 along with their driver and all three were charged with violating narcotics laws. Ramadhani admitted having started using methamphetamine while working as an actress, and having used it repeatedly since her father's death in 2014. In January 2022, all three were sentenced to a year in prison; prosecutors had requested mandatory drug treatment.

== Filmography ==
=== Film ===
Year	Role	Title	Notes
2007	Suster Ngesot	Vira	Lead role
2008	Hantu Jembatan Ancol	Donna	Lead role
2008	Kesurupan	Felina	Lead role

=== Television ===
Year	Title	Role	Notes	Network
1998	Saras 008	Nia	Supporting role	Indosiar
2002 - 2003	Bidadari 2	Helen	Supporting role	RCTI
2003	Srimulat			Indosiar
2003	Unyil			TPI
2003	Hantu Cilik	Lina	Supporting role	RCTI
2003 - 2005	Inikah Rasanya	Niken	Supporting role	SCTV
2003	Surga Ditelapak Kaki Ibu	Bunga	Supporting role	SCTV
2003 - 2004	Kisah Adinda	Olga	Lead role	RCTI
2004	Sitti Nurbaya	Sitti Nurbaya	Lead role	Trans TV
2004 - 2006	Bawang Merah Bawang Putih	Siska/Bawang Merah	Lead role	RCTI
2005	Anakku Bukan Anakku	Wilda	Supporting role	RCTI
2005	Iman			SCTV
2005	Leida	Nabila		
2005	Extravaganza ABG	Herself	Comedy variety show	Trans TV
2006	Hidayah		Episode: "Gadis Pembawa Kabar"	Trans TV
2006	Benci Jadi Cinta	Alya	Lead role	RCTI
2006 - 2007	Gue Sihir Lu	Luna/Sofie	Lead role	SCTV
2006	Hikmah 3	Marla	Lead role	Indosiar
2006	Ratapan Anak Tiri	Nina/Marsha	Lead role	RCTI
2006	Ridho	Aisyah	Supporting role	TV7
2007	Legenda		Episode: "7 Bidadari"	Trans TV
2007	Alisha	Alisha	Lead role	SCTV
2007	Cinta Jangan Buru-Buru	Mia	Lead role	SCTV
2008	Cinta Kirana	Kirana	Lead role	Indosiar
2008	Syarifa	Syarifa	Lead role	Indosiar
2008	Kian	Kian	Lead role	Indosiar
2008	Namaku Mentari	Tika	Supporting role	RCTI
2008 - 2009	Alisa	Natassa	Lead role	RCTI
2009	Cinta Nia	Nia	Lead role	SCTV
2013	Putri Nomor 1	Nia	Lead role	RCTI
2014	Timur Cinta	Alisha	Lead role	Kompas TV
