= Jodoh Wasiat Bapak Reborn =

Indonesian television series

- Genre: Horror; Supernatural; Comedy; Drama
- Written by: Lina Nurmalina; Amanah Syahidah; Indah Septi Eliyani
- Screenplay by: Goodscript Writers
- Directed by: Arie Aziz
- Starring: Nadya Arina; Kevin Julio; Bara Valentino; Dimas Putra; Cut Keke; Atalarik Syach; Teuku Zacky
- Theme music composer: Ryan Pitna
- Opening theme: "Dalam Gelap" by Oly Xandria
- Ending theme: "Dalam Gelap" by Oly Xandria
- Composer: Muhammad Fitri
- Country of origin: Indonesia
- Original language: Indonesian
- No. of seasons: 1
- No. of episodes: 20

Production
- Executive producers: Utojo Sutjiutama; Leonard Hadyanto; Nico Gowindra; Andi Pravidia; Sahli Himawan; Roro Sinduretno
- Producers: Utojo Sutjiutama; R. Deny Juliarto
- Cinematography: Zeta A. Maphilindo
- Editors: Rizal Basri; Wahyu Akbar Ramadhani
- Camera setup: Multi-camera
- Running time: 40–50 minutes
- Production company: Tobali Putra Productions

Original release
- Network: Netflix
- Release: 30 August – 18 September 2026
- Network: ANTV
- Release: 31 August – 19 September 2026

Related
- Jodoh Wasiat Bapak; Jodoh Wasiat Bapak Babak 2 Jodoh Wasiat Bapak 3

Jodoh Wasiat Bapak Reborn is an Indonesian television series produced by Tobali Putra Productions which premiered on 30 August 2026 on Netflix and premieres on 31 August 2026 on ANTV. It stars Nadya Arina, Kevin Julio, Bara Valentino, Dimas Putra, Cut Keke, Atalarik Syach, and Teuku Zacky.

== Plot ==
Adinda possesses the ability to glimpse a person's past by examining their body during an autopsy. Alongside her career as a doctor, she must also carry on her family's funeral services business.

Complications arise when her father, Adam, asks Adinda to take over the family business and find a soulmate—a match foretold in an ancient family heirloom book.

However, Adam subsequently dies under mysterious circumstances. Adinda inherits the old book, which contains his final wishes and a series of riddles that must be solved.

Combining her supernatural gifts with her medical expertise, Adinda strives to resolve the unfinished business of the deceased. She is accompanied on her mission by her younger brother, Aditya; her mother, Kania; and two assistants, Bobby and Malih.

Adinda's journey also involves two key figures. Reno, her ex-boyfriend—now a police detective—helps unravel various mysteries. Meanwhile, Fajar Darma, an architect, possesses a keen intuition regarding historic buildings that harbor mystical elements.

== Cast ==
=== Main ===
- Nadya Arina as Adinda Larasati: Adam and Kania's daughter; Aditya's sister; Reno's ex-fiancée
  - Aurel as child Adinda
- Kevin Julio as Fajar Darma
- Bara Valentino as Reno Wisnu Aji: Adinda's ex-fiancée
- Dimas Putra as Aditya Laksamana: Adam and Kania's son; Adinda's younger brother
- Cut Keke as Kania Kinanti: Adam's wife; Adinda and Aditya's mother
- Atalarik Syach as Adam Iryawan: Irwansyah's son; Kania's husband; Adinda and Aditya's father
- Teuku Zacky as Ki Rawa

=== Recurring ===
- Bopak Castello as Bobby
- Daus Separo as Malih
- Eldania Zahra as Pipit
- Iyang Darmawan as Pak RT Heru
- Renny Novita as Mbak Wini
- Ayuditha as Mpok Mini
- Aditya Rino as Aboy
- Vista Putri as Wanti
- Chika Waode as Asih
- Agung Saga as Karta
- Denino as Danny

=== Special appearances ===
- Chika Waode as Asih (eps 1-2)
- Shezy Idris as Yuni (eps 3-4)
- Puja Lauda as Pati (eps 3-4)
- Bernie Robson as Adi (eps 3-4)
- Kartika Sari Daud as Nenek Yuni (eps 3-4)
- Angga Asyafriena as Yuda (eps 5 -6)
- Jesslyn Elvaretta as Dita (eps 5-6)
- Rakhena Putri as Murni (eps 5-6)
- Andri Fairel as Soleh (eps 5-6)
- Yogi Werner as Harun (eps 5-6)
- Woro Gia as Nining (eps 5-6)
- Rachel Patricia as Lala Amelia (eps 7)
- Febry Khey as Lilis (eps 7)
- Valencia Evelyn as Arum (eps 7)
- Bianca Ramadhanty Farisi as Hera (eps 7)
- Irvanno Avryelle as Jojo (eps 7)
- Ryan Novanda as Andi (eps 7)
- Hafid Danulana as Arul (eps 7)
- Revan Dhika as Dado (eps 7)
- Firdha Razak as Ratna (eps 8)
- Indah Nicole as Indah (eps 8)
- Ivan Leonardo as Papa Andi (eps 8)
- Dr. Arif Kurniawan as Dokter Riko (eps 9)
- Dini Hanipahm as Gendhis (eps 9)
- Lilis Suganda as Utami (eps 9)
- Krisna Mukti as Mahendra (eps 9)
- Kemal Nurza as Inspector Bayu (eps 9)
- Adinda Latief as Asmi (eps 9)
- Rizky Firmansyah as Bondan (eps 9)
- Joe P Project as Jufri (eps 11)
- Emmie Lemu as Ida (eps 11)
- Faradiba as Neneng (eps 11)
- Aurellia Salma Varissa as Ayu (eps 12)
- Ike Muti as Mona (eps 12)
- Ali Mustafa as Robby (eps 12)
- Patar Silaban as Ivan (eps 12)
- Ayu Inten as Rami (eps 13)
- Chelcy Clarissa as Rami Muda (eps 13)
- Firan Sungkar as Kusno (eps 13)
- Adnan Djani as Lukman (eps 13)
- Callista Mercy as Kiki (eps 14)
- Guntur Nugraha as Danny (eps 14)
- Mayang Naomi as Ratih (eps 14)
- Reza Aditya as Toni (eps 15)
- Fitria Rasyidi as Evi (eps 15)
- Ida Laviany Yahya as Ibu Panti (eps 16)
- Nabilah Nariswari as Gaby (eps 16)
- Messy Alfiando as Gilang (eps 16)
- Mariana Putri as Indri (eps 16)
- Richard Derrick as Rio (eps 16)
- Azca Anhaf Baehaqi as Reno Remaja (eps 18)
- Bobby Suardi as Henry (eps 18)
- Abiyu as Henry Remaja (eps 18)
- Andri Kartiwa as Papa Reno (eps 18)
- Finza Kevin as Adam Remaja (eps 19)
- Nazwa Alesha as Kania Remaja (eps 19)
- Mackenzie Williams as Malini (eps 19)
- Kahfi Danesh as Ki Rawa Remaja (eps 19)

== Production ==
=== Casting ===
Nadya Arina was confirmed to play Adinda. and marks her comeback to TV after 3 year hiatus. Cut Keke was roped as Kania Kinanti. Teuku Zacky, credited as Jordan in this series, plays the role of Ki Rawa.
