= Menolak Talak (TV series) =

Indonesian television legal drama series

- Poster
- Genre: Romance; Comedy; Legal drama
- Created by: Ferry Fernandez
- Screenplay by: Team Tobali
- Directed by: Ruli Wanisar
- Starring: Vino G. Bastian; Marsha Timothy; Andi Annisa; Kiky Saputri; Ichal Muhammad; Roy Marten; Minati Atmanagara; Dina Lorenza; Aldi Taher; Abun Hadi; Rendy Kjaernett; Selvi Kitty; Adrian Aliman; Ananda George; Andi Soraya; Fadlan Muhammad; Aulia Sarah; Ferry Irawan; Emma Waroka; Reza Bukan; Dayu Wijanto
- Music by: Mathews Siahaan
- Opening theme: "It's Only Me" by Kaleb J
- Ending theme: "It's Only Me" by Kaleb J
- Country of origin: Indonesia
- Original language: Indonesian
- No. of seasons: 1
- No. of episodes: 41

Production
- Executive producer: Utojo Sutjiutama
- Producer: Ferry Fernandez
- Production locations: Jakarta, Indonesia
- Running time: 120 minutes
- Production company: Tobali Putra Productions

Original release
- Network: ANTV
- Release: 17 January – 26 February 2022

Menolak Talak (English: Refusing Divorce) is an Indonesian television legal drama series which premiered 17 January 2022 to 26 February 2022 on ANTV. This show is produced by Tobali Putra Productions. It starred Vino G Bastian, Marsha Timothy, Andi Annisa, Kiky Saputri and Ichal Muhammad in the main roles.

The show ended on 26 February 2022. This show was replaced by Suami Pengganti from 1 March 2022.

== Plot ==
Natasha Aryapura (Marsha Timothy), a beautiful and ambitious lawyer, is nicknamed the Queen of Divorce Jakarta because she always wins divorce cases.

Natasha has just finished her master's degree abroad. She returned to Indonesia and received news that there was a mediator called the Cool-looking Rujuk Pawang, who had succeeded in thwarting divorce cases and harming Natasha as a legal consultant because many of his clients did not get divorced.

Natasha meets the mediator, who turns out to be Alif Alqodry (Vino G. Bastian), a very pious young man who chooses to be a mediator due to childhood trauma due to the separation of his father, Malih (Malih) and his mother, whom he is still looking for. Alif is assisted by his secretary, Nur (Kiky Saputri) who is coquettish and yearns for Alif.

Natasha and Alif often meet in various divorce cases and become rivals. Until one day, Natasha is faced with a problem when her father, Yan Aryapura (Roy Marten) and mother, Marlina Aryapura (Minati Atmanegara) decide to divorce. Natasha was forced to lower her prestige and contacted Alif to ask for help to keep her parents together.

Without them knowing it, they fell in love with each other. However, among them is Inayah (Andi Annisa), Alif's little friend who secretly loves Alif.

Can Natasha's parents divorce bring Natasha closer to Alif? And who can win Alif's heart?

== Cast ==
=== Main ===
- Vino G. Bastian as Alif Alqodry: Malih's son; Natasha's love-interest
- Marsha Timothy as Natasha Aryapura: Yan and Marlina's daughter; Alif's love-interest

=== Recurring ===
- Andi Annisa as Inayah: Alif's childhood friend; Dina's daughter
- Kiky Saputri as Nur
- Roy Marten as Yan Aryapura: Marlina's husband; Alif's father
- Minati Atmanagara as Marlina Aryapura: Yan's wife; Alif's mother
- Malih as Babeh Malih: Alif's father
- Ichal Muhammad as Andre
- Dina Lorenza as Lilis: Inayah's mother
- Aldi Taher as Ijon
- Kintan Putri as Rose: Oding's husband
- Abun Hadi as Oding: Rose's wife
- Rully Fiss as Kentos
- Cahaya Dewi as Nagita
- Bima Samudra as Saga
- Vidi Bule as Wildan

=== Special appearances ===
- Maya Wulan as Vera
- Temon Templar as Karyo
- Rendy Kjaernett as Rendy
- Selvi Kitty as Selvi
- Adrian Aliman as Adrian
- Asri Welas as Welas
- Ananda George as Ananda
- Andi Soraya as Andi
- Fadlan Muhammad as Fadlan
- Ben Joshua as Ben
- Aulia Sarah as Aulia
- Ferry Irawan as Ferry
- Emma Waroka as Emma
- Reza Bukan as Reza
- Dayu Wijanto as Dayu

== Awards and nominations ==
Year	Award	Category	Recipient	Result	Ref(s)
2022	Festival Film Bandung 2022	Best Show	Menolak Talak	Nominated	
