= Alisa (TV series) =

- Created by: Leo Sutanto
- Directed by: Desiana Larasati
- Starring: Alyssa Soebandono; Christian Sugiono; Nia Ramadhani; Donna Harun; Ali Syakieb; Marcel Chandrawinata; Didi Riyadi
- Opening theme: Cinta Sampai di Sini by D'Masiv
- Ending theme: Cinta Sampai di Sini by D'Masiv
- Country of origin: Indonesia
- Original language: Indonesian
- No. of episodes: 124

Production
- Production location: Jakarta
- Running time: 60 minutes
- Production company: SinemArt

Original release
- Network: RCTI
- Release: December 20, 2008 – April 23, 2009

Alisa is an Indonesian soap opera television series that was aired on RCTI from December 20, 2008, to April 23, 2009. It was produced by video productions house and distributor company SinemArt, and directed by Desiana Larasati.

== Cast ==
- Alyssa Soebandono as Alyssa
- Christian Sugiono as Evan
- Nia Ramadhani as Natasha
- Ali Syakieb as Eric
- Marcel Chandrawinata as Nono
- Didi Riyadi as Freisco
- Farish as Ardy
- Marcella Simon as Marcella
- Hanna Hasyim as Laksmi
- Riyanto RA as Sarwana
- Frans Tumbuan as Henri
- Shinta Muin as Lela
- Ana Pinem as Noor
- Ivanka Suwandi as Fiah
- Tengku Firmansyah as Sanjaya, Jay, Jody (dual role)
- Cindy Fatika Sari as Riska
- Adjie Pangestu as Denny
- Rima Melati as Rima
- Mieke Widjaya as Larasati
- Olla Ramlan as Evan's Aunt

== Plot ==
Alisa (Alyssa Soebandono) and Evan (Christian Sugiono) met in an unpleasant circumstance. Alisa, a beverage Sales Promotion Girl, bumped into Evan and knocked him down while casing a guy who stole her merchandise. Evan was furious. His suit was all wet, while at that time he was in a rush to meet a prospective client.

But destiny brought them back together. Alisa turns out to be one of Evan's student. Because of the bad first impression, both Alisa and Evan could never get along. They were always arguing. Alisa couldn't stand Evan's arrogant, playboy, rude, and degrading attitude towards people who are under his social status. Evan on the other hand, despised Alisa's know it all attitude, pride rebellious and no-respect behavior.

Alisa is a simple girl. She was forced to work odd jobs to pay for her daily expenses, as well as her father's medication. Alisa also worked as Natasha’s (Nia Ramadhani) clothes washer. Natasha happened to be Evan's girlfriend, his main woman among all the ladies who surrounded him.

After a long and winding journey and time, Evan and Alisa, in the end, couldn't deny the feeling deep down inside that they were actually in love. They began dating and were preparing to tie the knot.

But, suddenly, a shocking truth emerged. Turns out, Evan and Alisa were siblings. Alisa was in fact the daughter of Henri, Evan's father, through an affair. The wedding had to be called off, Both were devastated.

How did the love story go? Will Evan and Alisa be together in the end? Or will they get back together with their previous lovers??
