= Red Cobex =

- Film poster
- Directed by: Upi
- Screenplay by: Upi
- Produced by: Chand Parvez Servia
- Starring: Tika Panggabean; Sarah Sechan; Lukman Sardi; Revalina S. Temat; Aida Nurmala; Indy Barends; Cut Mini; Shanty; Irfan Hakim; Edo Kondologit
- Cinematography: Ical Tanjung
- Edited by: Wawan I. Wibowo
- Music by: Candil
- Production company: Starvision Plus
- Distributed by: Starvision Plus
- Release date: June 17, 2010
- Running time: 105 minutes
- Country: Indonesia
- Language: Indonesian

Red Cobex is a 2010 Indonesian comedy action feature film. The film was written and directed by Upi, and stars Tika Panggabean, Lukman Sardi, Revalina S. Temat, Sarah Sechan, Indy Barends, Cut Mini, Aida Nurmala, Shanty, and Irfan Hakim. The film was released on June 17, 2010, and is a Starvision Plus production.

== Plot ==
Red Cobex are a gang of mothers from different Indonesian tribes and regions who act as vigilantes to protect the vulnerable and defend the weak while punishing criminals. Mama Ana (Tika Panggabean) and Yopie (Lukman Sardi), her only child, and the Red Cobex avenge gamblers, porn DVD sellers, as well as a jewelry store owned by Albert (Edo Kondologit), Mama Ana's remarried ex-husband. Eventually the Red Cobex gang are arrested by the police and charged. A year after the arrest, Yopie is released from prison and stays with Ramli (Irfan Hakim), his friend, and then falls in love with Astuti (Revalina S. Temat), but Astuti's family doesn't agree with their relationship due to the fact that Yopie's mother is still imprisoned. When a theft occurs at the restaurant where they work, Yopie is accused of the crime – even by Astuti. Astuti discovers that Yopie was innocent, makes up with him and they are engaged. A riot breaks out during the engagement ceremony. Thugs employed by Mama Ana's former husband fight the Red Cobex.

== Cast ==
- Tika Panggabean as Mama Ana
- Indy Barends as Tante Lisa
- Aida Nurmala as Yu Halimah
- Sarah Sechan as Mbok Bariah
- Cut Mini as Cik Meymey
- Lukman Sardi as Yopie Papilaya
- Edo Kondologit as Albert
- Irfan Hakim as Ramli
- Shanty as Ipah
- Revalina S. Temat as Astuti

== Awards ==
Year	Award	Category	Recipient(s)	Result	Ref(s)
2010	Indonesian Film Festival	Best Leading Actor	Lukman Sardi	Nominated	
2010	Indonesian Film Festival	Best Film Editing	Wawan I. Wibowo	Nominated	
