= Bawang Merah Bawang Putih (TV series) =

Indonesian soap opera

- Created by: Manoj Punjabi
- Written by: Deddy Armand; Krishna Dwinata Armand
- Directed by: Mukta Dhond; M.Zein Ashari
- Music by: Herbanu PW
- Opening theme: "Pilih Warnamu"
- Country of origin: Indonesia
- Original language: Indonesian
- No. of episodes: 108

Original release
- Network: RCTI (2004–2006); TV3 (2006–2007); KGMB (2013–2014); KHNL (2013–2014); Space Power TV
- Release: May 18, 2004 – June 6, 2006

Bawang Merah Bawang Putih (English: Garlic and Red Onion) is an Indonesian soap opera (sinetron) produced by MD Entertainment. This is a modernized adaptation of an old Sumatran folktale that corresponds with the story of Cinderella. The soap opera stars Revalina S. Temat, Dimaz Andrean, Nia Ramadhani, Lydia Kandou, Dwi Yan, Helsi Herlinda, Nena Rosier, Nana Khairina, Ully Artha, Ade Irawan, Elsye Virgita, and Marsha Aruan. The soap opera aired on RCTI between 2004 and 2006. It also reran on local channel TVRI Jawa Barat in West Java.

It won a Panasonic Awards as Favorite Drama Series Program in 2005.

== Cast ==
- Revalina S. Temat as Alya Pratama (Bawang Putih)
- Dimaz Andrean as Ferdi Adriansyah
- Nia Ramadhani as Siska Sumanto (Bawang Merah)
- Lydia Kandou as Yasmin
- Dwi Yan sebagai as Indra Pratama/To'ing
- Helsi Herlinda as Rika Sumanto
- Nena Rosier as Putri Cahaya
- Marsha Aruan as Olivia
- Ade Irawan as Bertha
- Rifky Alhabsyi as Andre
- Herjunot Ali as Andre
- Ivan Permana as Roy
- Toddy Zilla as Benny/Ramon Palsu
- Geccia Moundy as Ramon
- Tizza Radia as Jenny
- Elsye Virgita as Irma
- Dude Harlino as Joe
- Rosie Anggriani as Mirna
- Marlon Renaldy as Pak Guru
- Meidian Maladi as Jodi
- Fitri Ayu as Vera
- Yana Zein as Bella
- Muhammad Faqih Annur as Haikal
- Umar Syarief as Imron
- Naimma Aljufri as Naimma

== Synopsis ==
The story of Bawang Merah Bawang Putih unfolds in the present day, but takes a moral message from the original, famous Indonesian folktale; Bawang Merah Bawang Putih.

Bawang Merah Bawang Putih is about two pretty girls, who are neighbors and study at the same school. Alya is a diligent student who plays the character of Bawang Putih in the opera of Bawang Merah Bawang Putih, while Siska plays Bawang Merah. They are known as Bawang Merah and Bawang Putih in their school because the opera was a big success. Both teenagers have their own circle of friends. Siska lives with her mother, Rika, who is divorced from her father. Her father is in jail because of corruption, so they live in affliction. Alya lives happily with her parents. Her father Indra, is a successful businessman, while Yasmin, her mother, is a friendly housewife.

Siska's character as Bawang Merah in the opera continues in her life. Bawang Merah and her mother are jealous of Bawang Putih's life. Rika and Siska are very good at acting so Alya and her mother don't realize that Siska and her mother resent them.

When Ferdy, a new student, falls in love with Bawang Putih, Siska starts to hate Bawang Putih more each day. Ferdy actually comes from a rich family, but he ran away from home and lives simply in Jakarta, because he cannot stand his father who is very strict. Bawang Merah tries to separate Freddy and Bawang Putih constantly. While, Rika also tries to destroy Jasmine's family. Rika acts so good that Yasmin treats her not as a neighbor, but as a sister. Yasmin always helps her, especially when it comes to money.

Finally, Rika has a chance to poison Jasmine, and she dies. Before her death, she gets the chance to tell her daughter to be careful of Rika, but Bawang Putih gets the message wrong. She thinks that her mother asks her to take Rika into her life after her mother died. Rika keeps trying to win Indra until finally they get married and she moves into his house with her daughter. After this, Bawang Putih lives in agony and suffering. But her agony doesn't make her change. She takes her suffering with patience so God blesses her.

She makes friends with a fairy that no one can see. There is no eternal crime. Goodness finally overcomes evil. Finally Bawang Putih lives happily, while Bawang Merah and her mother pay for their past actions.

== International airings ==
All 108 episodes of the soap opera were also popular in Malaysia when TV3 aired it from 2006 to early 2007.

From late February 2013 until mid May 2014, Hawaiian television stations KGMB and KHNL aired a simulcast dub of Bawang Merah Bawang Putih in Hawaiian titled Pele a me Hiʻiaka (Pele and Hiʻiaka) every Thursday and Friday night at 6:30pm, replacing Entertainment Tonight (KHNL) and The Insider (KGMB).

== Awards and nominations ==
Year	Award	Category	Recipients	Results
2005	Panasonic Awards	Favorite Drama Series Program	Bawang Merah Bawang Putih	Won
2006	Panasonic Awards	Favorite Drama Series Program	Bawang Merah Bawang Putih	Nominated
