= Suami Pengganti =

Indonesian drama television series

- Genre: Romance; Melodrama
- Created by: Titin Suryani
- Based on: Suami Pengganti by Mamie
- Written by: Team Verona
- Directed by: Dinesh S. Samby; Anto Agam; Bara Bantalaseta; Paulus Puijk
- Starring: Laura Theux; Ben Joshua; Rifky Balweel; Rachquel Nesia; Helsi Herlinda; Nadya Shakira; Felicia Amerda; Mehnaz Marinez; Niniek Arum; Imam Farisyah; Exan Pahlevi; Icha Nabilah; Sani Fahreza; Opi Bachtiar; Zidni Adam; Raffan Arryan
- Theme music composer: Mahen
- Opening theme: "Pura-Pura Lupa" — Mahen
- Ending theme: "Pura-Pura Lupa" — Mahen
- Composer: Ary Logam
- Country of origin: Indonesia
- Original language: Indonesian
- No. of seasons: 1
- No. of episodes: 373

Production
- Executive producer: Titin Suryani
- Producer: Titin Suryani
- Cinematography: Iphul
- Editor: Cutting Point Post
- Camera setup: Multi-camera
- Running time: 120 minutes
- Production company: Verona Pictures

Original release
- Network: ANTV
- Release: 1 March 2022 – 19 March 2023

Suami Pengganti (English: Substitute Husband) is an Indonesian drama television series that aired on ANTV. The series premiered on 1 March 2022 replacing Menolak Talak. This series is produced by Verona Pictures and adapted from NovelToon with the same title written by Mamie. It starred Laura Theux, Ben Joshua, Rifky Balweel and Rachquel Nesia in the lead role.

== Plot ==
Ariana (Laura Theux) has been in a long-term relationship with Galvin (Ben Joshua) and finally agrees to marry him.

On the day of her bachelorette party, a tragedy occurs involving Ariana and Choky (Fajar Rezky), prompting Galvin to cancel the wedding.

After hearing about the incident, Saka (Rifky Balweel) agrees to become Ariana's replacement husband. Although their marriage is not initially based on love, Ariana gradually develops feelings for Saka as they spend more time together.

However, just as their relationship begins to deepen, Ariana discovers that Saka is having an affair. She suspects her two best friends, Celine (Rachquel Nesia) and Yuna (Nadia Shakira), as well as Dita (Gita Virga), Saka's former girlfriend, who still has feelings for him, and Sisil (Haviva Rifda), her personal secretary, who also admires Saka.

As Ariana struggles to determine which of those closest to her may be involved, Choky returns and begins terrorising her. Meanwhile, Galvin, who still loves Ariana, re-enters her life, further complicating her marriage to Saka.

Ariana must decide whether she can preserve the marriage she has built with Saka after accepting him as her husband.

== Cast ==
=== Main ===
- Laura Theux as Ariana Wiraguna: Kusuma and Devi's daughter; Saka's ex-wife; Galvin's wife. (2022–2023)
- Ben Joshua as Galvin Wijaya: Wijaya and Niken's son; Ariana's ex-fiancée turned husband; Riri's ex-husband; Abian's father. (2022–2023)
- Rifky Balweel as Saka Ardian Putra: Wijaya and Anjani's son; Ariana and Dita's ex-husband; Celine's ex-fiancée; Dinda's husband. (2022–2023)
- Rachquel Nesia as Celine Anastasya: Sonya's daughter; Ariana's best friend; Saka's ex-fiancée; Dante's wife. (2022–2023)

=== Recurring ===
- Fajar Rezky as Chocky: Ariana's obsessive lover; Sisil's love-interest. (2022–2023)
- Haviva Rifda as Sisil: Ariana's secretary; Wijaya's ex-lover; Chocky's love-interest. (2022)
- Nadya Shakira as Yuna Irawan: Yuyun's daughter; Ariana's best friend; Dion's ex-lover; Tommy's wife. (2022–2023)
- Tio Duarte as Kusuma Wiraguna: Devi's ex-husband; Ariana's father; Anjani's ex-lover. (2022–2023)
- Helsi Herlinda as Devi Arliani: Kusuma's ex-wife; Ariana's mother. (Dead) (2022)
- Erlin Sarintan as Niken Wijaya: Wijaya's second wife; Galvin's mother; Abian's grandmother. (2022–2023)
- Denny Martin as Wijaya: Niken's husband; Galvin's father; Anjani's ex-husband; Abian's grandfather. (2022–2023)
- Felicia Amerda as Riri Resviandira: Galvin's ex-wife; Abian's mother; Ben's love interest. (2022–2023)
- Unknown / Raffan Arryan as Abian Wijaya: Galvin and Riri's son. (2022–2023) (2023)
- Sani Fahreza as Tommy: Saka's best friend; Yuna's husband. (2022–2023)
- Yogi Tama as Dion Saputra: Rani's husband; Yuna's ex-lover; Dita's rented husband. (2022–2023)
- Wempie Bona as Bona: Saka's best friend. (2022–2023)
- Gita Virga as Dita Nugroho: Saka's ex-wife. (2022–2023)
- Rizky Mocil as Dr. Richi (Dead) (2022)
  - as Pedro: Wiraguna's driver. (2022–2023)
- Niniek Arum as Yasmine: Wiraguna's maid. (2022–2023)
- Mehnaz Marinez as Anjani Wiryosudirjo: Saka's mother; Dante's step-mother; Wijaya's ex-wife; Kusuma's ex-lover. (2022–2023)
- Carlo Milk as Dante Wiryosudirjo: Chocky's uncle; Anjani's step-son; Celine's husband. (2022–2023)
- Icha Nabilah as Dr. Dinda Maulida: Neurologist; Bram's ex-wife; Dante's friend; Saka's obsessive lover turned wife. (2022–2023)
- Zidni Adam as Ben: Riri's love interest. (2022–2023)
- Ida Yahya as Ben's mother (2023)
- Indra Brotolaras as Justin Ganindra: Bambang's son; Kiara's wife; Ariana's obsessive lover. (2022–2023)
- Julia Van Vloten as Kiara: Justin's wife. (2022–2023)
- Uwi Jasmine as Sonya: Celine's mother. (Dead) (2022)
- Exan Pahlevi as Bram: Dinda's ex-husband. (2022)
- Gilang Rama as Anwar: The man who was an arranged marriage to Yuna. (2022)
- Irma Fitriani as Rani: Dion's wife. (2022)
- Imam Farisyah as Dr. Bayu: Galvin's friend; Ariana's psychiatrist. (2022)
- Opi Bachtiar as Boy Kimochi: fortune-teller (2022)
- Yuwani as Yuyun: Yuna's mother (2022)
- Gracia Marcilia as Luna (2022)
- Adrian Aliman as Hans Marco (2022)
- Lina Fadilla as Febri Wulandari: Ridwan's wife; Saka's adopted mother. (Dead) (2022)
- Ascha Soemitro as Marwan: Ipah's husband; Nuri's father. (2022)
- Fauziah Daud as Ipah: Marwan's wife; Nuri's mother (2022)
- Varisha Afsheen as Nuri: Marwan and Ipah's daughter. (2022)

== Production ==
=== Development and premiere ===
“We are back with Verona Pictures, presenting a soap opera with an interesting conflict that has never existed before. Seeing the number of readers on the e-novel which is quite high, we hope that the soap opera can be of interest and become the newest favorite spectacle for loyal ANTV viewers.”

— Kiki Zulkarnain, Chief Program & Communication Officer

The first promo of this series was released on 23 February 2022. The storyline is based on the Novel of the same title. This series premiered on 1 March 2022.

=== Casting ===
Laura Theux was roped in to play Ariana. Rifky Balweel was chosen to play Saka. and Ben Joshua to play the role of Galvin. Helsi Herlinda joined the cast as Devi. In September 2022, Herlinda quit the show due to her character's death.

=== Filming ===
On 21 April 2022 the show completed 50 episodes. The show completes 100 episodes on 9 June 2022. The show as also filmed in various locations including Bali in September 2022, and Anyer Beach in October 2022. In December 2022, the show filmed in Melbourne for a special episode of Ariana and Justin's vacation while watching a concert. On 8 March 2023, this series filmed for last episode.

== Controversy ==
=== IBC give written warning ===
Indonesian Broadcasting Commission (IBC) imposed a written sanction on the 5 March 2022 broadcast because it featured scenes of two women consuming liquor and the depiction of both of them being drunk/staggered as a result of consuming the drink.

== Awards and nominations ==
Year	Award	Category	Recipient	Result	Ref(s)
2022	Festival Film Bandung 2022	Best Actor	Ben Joshua	Won	
2022	Festival Film Bandung 2022	Best Actress	Laura Theux	Won	
