= Jodoh Wasiat Bapak 3 =

Indonesian television series

- Genre: Horror; Supernatural; Comedy; Drama
- Created by: Ferry Fernandez
- Written by: Team Tobali
- Screenplay by: Ferry Fernandez
- Directed by: Ceppy Gober
- Starring: Agoye Mahendra; Indah Nicole; Daniel Rutters; Intan Mita; Tessa Kaunang; Daus Separo; Bopak Castello; Ponco Buwono; Sanjid Azero; Jenny Cortez; Sally Marcelina; Tasman Taher; Menco Hidayat; Gessy Selvia; Jasmine Elfira; Rocky Jeff; Bima Samudra; Cerelia Raissa; Cathy Fakandi; Muhammad Sidik Edward; Abio Abie; Erwin Cortez; Anna Tairas; Helsi Herlinda
- Theme music composer: Judika
- Opening theme: "Bagaimana Kalau Aku Tidak Baik Baik Saja" by Judika
- Ending theme: "Bagaimana Kalau Aku Tidak Baik-Baik Saja" by Judika
- Composer: Mathews Siahaan
- Country of origin: Indonesia
- Original language: Indonesian
- No. of seasons: 1
- No. of episodes: 28

Production
- Executive producer: Utojo Sutjiutama
- Producer: Ferry Fernandez
- Camera setup: Multi-camera
- Production company: Tobali Putra Productions

Original release
- Network: ANTV
- Release: 20 March – 18 April 2023

Related
- Jodoh Wasiat Bapak; Jodoh Wasiat Bapak Babak 2 Jodoh Wasiat Bapak Reborn

Jodoh Wasiat Bapak 3 (popularly known as JWB 3) is an Indonesian television series produced by Tobali Putra Productions which premiered on 20 March 2023 to 18 April 2023 at ANTV. It stars Agoye Mahendra, Indah Nicole, Daniel Rutters and Intan Mita. It is the third installment of the Jodoh Wasiat Bapak series.

== Plot ==
Ratih is married to Aldi, a resort entrepreneur in Bali. Revan, Aldi's biological son, is happy because someone is now caring for and looking after his father.

However, Bopak and Daus, residents of Kucrit village, were shocked to hear the news that Ratih had remarried. They couldn't believe it until they saw proof for themselves.

They decided to fly to Bali, but the problem was that they only knew Ratih had married in Bali without knowing the exact address. They wandered around Bali in confusion until they were robbed. Fortunately, Aldi came to their aid.

Bopak and Daus were grateful for Aldi's help. However, they were shocked to discover that Aldi was actually Ratih's husband, leaving them both annoyed and confused.

Bopak and Daus ultimately decided to stay at the resort until all of Bopak's financial matters were resolved. Their presence brought a lively atmosphere to the Nawasena resort.

Adding to the excitement was the presence of the neighborhood chief, who was also curious about the rumor that Ratih had remarried. Meanwhile, the resort had a new employee named Dewa.

Dewa had fallen in love with Ayu, a chef at the resort. Although Ayu and Revan had liked each other for a long time, they were both too shy to admit their feelings.

With this new dynamic, Revan faced an even greater challenge in winning Ayu's heart. The resort, which had been peaceful, soon turned into a place of terror.

It all began when the car that Revan and Ayu were traveling in suddenly experienced brake failure, causing it to slide out of control. Luckily, Nimas Asih, the spirit of Ayu's ancestors, saved them from a serious accident.

Things took a turn for the worse when Aldi began to act strangely, as if he were under a spell. The situation escalated further with the discovery of a small child found dead near the resort.

Complications arose when Sarah, Aldi's first wife, returned, claiming that she and Aldi were not divorced. Her presence exacerbated Aldi's high blood pressure, leading to him falling down the stairs. Aldi was critically injured and later died.

Before his passing, while he was ill, Aldi had prepared a will for Revan. In it, he stated that Revan must uphold the good name of the resort, continue providing social car services for those in need, and seek Ratih's approval when choosing a partner.

== Cast ==
=== Main ===
- Agoye Mahendra as Revan: Aldi and Sarah's son; Ratih's step-son.
- Indah Nicole as Ayu: Ni Mas's daughter.
- Daniel Rutters as Dewa
- Intan Mita as Ni Mas Asih: Ayu's mother.

=== Recurring ===
- Gabriella Desta as Mischa
- Tessa Kaunang as Ratih: Aldi's second wife.
- Asri Handayani as Sarah: Aldi's first wife.
- Bopak Castello as Bopak
- Daus Separo as Daus
- Ponco Buwono as Anggara
- Alodya Desi as Kimmy: Dewa's friend.
- Hasan Bewok as Ustaz Syakieb
- Oka Sugawa as Aldi: Sarah and Ratih's ex-husband. (Dead)

=== Special appearances ===
- Adi Irwandi as Wira (Eps 1)
- Fajar Vijei as Johan (Eps 1)
- Stevie Domminique Jollie as Dita (Eps 1)
- Chantika Handayani as Arin (Eps 1)
- Guntur Nugraha as Beno (Eps 2)
- Sanjid Azero as Erwin (Eps 2)
- Veranice Vicada as Devi (Eps 2)
- Arfan Afif as Angga (Eps 3)
- Jenny Cortez as Merry (Eps 3)
- Chintya Kiren as Rosa (Eps 3)
- Monique Henry as Yenni (Eps 4)
- Roy Romagny as Rustam (Eps 4)
- Robert Chaniago as Rudi (Eps 5)
- Ayu Inten as Wulan (Eps 5)
- Shabrina Paramitha as Tia (Eps 5)
- Sally Marcelina as Bu Desi (Eps 6)
- Tasman Taher as Pak Jimmy (Eps 6)
- Mega Putri as Fitri (Eps 6)
- Dimas Davidson as Hadi (Eps 6)
- Rendy Kusdiana as Bagas (Eps 7)
- Jihan Husein as Suci (Eps 7)
- Julian Tara as Dayat (Eps 7)
- Miss Xiu as Kasih (Eps 7)
- Aditya Rino as Denis (Eps 8)
- Intan Melodi as Agni (Eps 8)
- Fajar Evans as Nando (Eps 8)
- Jake Equivallen (Eps 8)
- Menco Hidayat as Bli Putu (Eps 9)
- Elsya Herlina Syarif as Ida (Eps 9)
- Billy Jonathan as Justin (Eps 9)
- Mega Kencana as Ani (Eps 9)
- Ferdian Ariyadi as Gusti (Eps 10)
- Shade Sujana as Dika (Eps 10)
- Sigit Antonio as Sigit (Eps 11)
- Cahaya Dewi as Eva (Eps 11)
- Dewa Aditya sebagai Kohar (Eps 11)
- Ayend Narendra as Miko (Eps 11)
- Elgi Purnama as Doni (Eps 12)
- Kemas Rusdy as Arga (Eps 12)
- Angel Ginting as Sitha (Eps 12)
- Ditra Marfie as Herman (Eps 13)
- Vidya Ully as Winda (Eps 14)
- Joy Octaviano as Jerry (Eps 14)
- Kenzo Danendra Manaf as Rama (Eps 14)
- Helsi Herlinda as Linda (Eps 15)
- Tahta Perlawanan Siregar as Prasetya (Eps 15)
- Maya Asmara as Sari (Eps 15)
- Dave Edwards as Hanif (Eps 15)
- Sean Hasyim as Bambang (Eps 16)
- Agus Wibowo as Kadir (Eps 16)
- Yurika Riidy as Rita (Eps 16)
- Amec Jen Aris as Damar (Eps 17)
- Inggrid Widjanarko as Wati (Eps 17)
- Dita Rientika as Lia (Eps 17)
- Ega Olivia as Anggi (Eps 18)
- Raeshard Octaviansha as Felix (Eps 18)
- Kamil Rafif as Toni (Eps 18)
- Rendy Septino as Bima (Eps 19)
- Ida Laviany Yahya as Lastri (Eps 19)
- Disha Devina as Nastiti (Eps 20)
- Lulu Zakaria as Sayyan (Eps 20)
- Rizky Sabath as Mardi (Eps 20)
- Puspa Ritchwary as Gita (Eps 21)
- Daniel Leo as Bayu (Eps 21)
- Alfa Dewi as Anya (Eps 21)
- Gessy Selvia as Linda (Eps 22)
- Jasmine Elfira as Citra (Eps 22)
- Restha Tyson as Budi (Eps 22)
- Rocky Jeff as Alex (Eps 23)
- Fenny Wijaya as Dina (Eps 23)
- Aura Giselle as Farida (Eps 23)
- Luke Benny as Made (Eps 23)
- Bima Samudra as Pendi (Eps 24)
- Cerelia Raissa as Hanifah (Eps 24)
- Salsabila Friza as Yuni (Eps 24)
- Cathy Fakandi as Rindu (Eps 25)
- Muhammad Sidik Edward as Dennis (Eps 25)
- Iksania Anisa as Monic (Eps 25)
- Yani Martini as Mami Sania (Eps 25)
- Diah Ripa as Yanti (Eps 25)
- Abio Abie as Rahmat (Eps 26)
- Erwin Cortez as Albi (Eps 26)
- Syavana Mameh as Mila (Eps 26)
- Wulan Jyotista as Syifa (Eps 26)
- Kartika Waode as Tissa (Eps 27)
- Alisia Daraputri as Ika (Eps 27)
- Anna Tairas as Nek Sumi (Eps 28)
- Nabil Segaf as Sumarno (Eps 28)
- Fia Bunova as Alya (Eps 28

== Production ==
=== Development ===
A thanksgiving event was held at the filming location Bali on 11 March 2023 prior to filming for the series.

=== Casting ===
Agoye Mahendra and Indah Nicole was chosen to play the main role as Revan and Ayu. Daniel Rutters join the cast as Dewa. Intan Mita was chosen to play the role of Ni Mas Asih.
