= Pintu Hidayah =

- Also known as: The God's Way; The Door of Hidayah
- Created by: Leo Sutanto
- Starring: Various
- Opening theme: "Akhirnya" ("Finally") by Gigi
- Ending theme: "Akhirnya" ("Finally") by Gigi
- Country of origin: Indonesia
- Original language: Indonesian

Production
- Production location: Jakarta
- Running time: 1 hour
- Production company: SinemArt

Original release
- Network: RCTI; TPI/MNCTV
- Release: June 19, 2005 – July 1, 2007

Pintu Hidayah is an Islamic religious soap opera aired by RCTI. The series stars all SinemArt casts with the title of a different storyline every week. Pintu Hidayah was first aired from 2005 until 2007, and reruns can be seen on MNCTV.

== Cast ==
- Marshanda
- Alyssa Soebandono
- Asmirandah
- Kirana Larasati
- Nabila Syakieb
- Paramitha Rusady
- Febby Rastanty
- Farah Debby
- Putri Patricia
- Indra Bruggman
- Ayu Diah Pasha
- Helsi Herlinda
- Boy Tirayoh
- Ayudia Bing Slamet
- Fuad Zulkarnain
- Kiki Fatmala
- Henidar Amroe
- Cindy Fatika Sari
- Delia Paramitha
- Adrian Maulana
- Raya Kohandi
- Adipura
- Devi Permatasari
- Lulu Tobing
- Grace Wijaya
- Betharia Sonata
- Ririn Dwi Ariyanti
- Ade Surya Akbar
- Rionaldo Stockhorst
- Octavia Yati
- Ayu Anjani
- Adjie Pangestu
- Billy Boedjanger
- Matias Muchus
- Della Puspita
- Donny Damara
- Cheche Kirani
- Dina Lorenza
- Olivia Zalianty
- Chacha Frederica
- Eeng Sapthadi
- Krisna Mukti
- Richa Novisha
- Tyra Renata
- Syarmi Amanda
- Lucky Perdana
- Adam Jordan
- Aiman Ricky
- Nani Widjaja
- Ana Pinem
- Adhitya Putri
- Rachel Amanda
- Gisela Cindy
- Gracia Indri
- Novia Ardhana
- Tengku Firmansyah
- Alice Norin
