= Alyssa Soebandono =

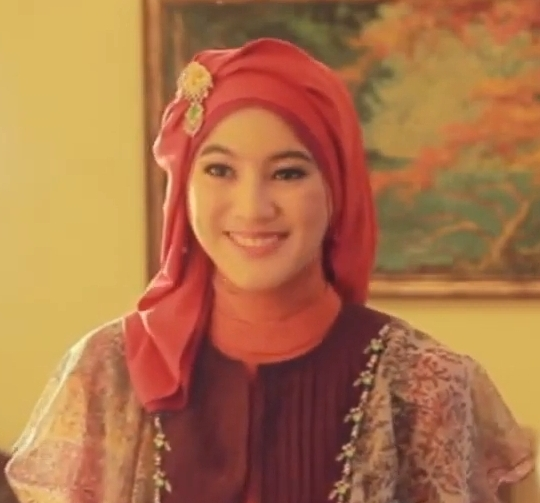
- Soebandono in 2018
- Born: Anindya Alyssa Soebandono; December 25, 1991 (age 34); Jakarta, Indonesia
- Education: Monash University (B.A.)
- Occupations: Celebrity, singer, model
- Years active: 2000–present
- Spouse: Dude Harlino (m. 2014)
- Musical career
- Genres: Pop
- Instrument: Vocal
- Labels: Royal Prima Musikindo; Sony Music Indonesia
- Website: Alyssa Soebandono

Anindya Alyssa Soebandono (born 25 December 1991) is an Indonesian actress, model and singer. She has appeared in many soap operas, commercials, and several films.

== Early life ==
Anindya Alyssa Soebandono was born on December 25, 1991, in Jakarta, Indonesia. Her father, Joni Pasifiano Soebandono (knownly as J.P. Soebandono), is a president director for PT. Usaha Sistim Informasi Jaya and Agent IBM, also former lecturer assistant and Angky Wardani, an housewife. She has an oldest brother and a youngest sister.

== Career ==
Alyssa Soebandono has starred in many soap operas, among other titles, like Pengantin Remaja, Upik Abu dan Laura, Alisa, Kejora dan Bintang, Ada Apa Denganmu, Aisyah, Bintang, and many more. Alyssa Soebandono also played in several films, including Petualangan Sherina (2000). In addition, Alyssa Soebandono has appeared in several television commercials. In 2010, Alyssa Soebandono began her debut singer career and released a mini album, titled Cerita Cinta Kita (2010), which was awarded for 2011 Best Trendy Pop Female Solo Artist in Anugerah Musik Indonesia.

== Personal life ==
Alyssa Soebandono is married to actor Dude Harlino, who is 11 years older than her they were married in Sasana Kriya building, Taman Mini Indonesia Indah on 22 March 2014, with a dowry in the form of money amounting to Rp. 2.203.014. They have two sons and one daughter.

== Filmography ==
=== Film ===
Year	Title	Role	Notes
2000	Petualangan Sherina	Sherina' friend (as cameo)	Debut film
2003	Janus: Prajurit Terakhir	Indri	Lead role
2005	Inikah Rasanya Cinta?	Nadia	Lead role

=== Television ===
Soap opera
Year	Title	Role	Notes	Broadcast
2003	Bayangan Adinda	Adinda/Amanda	15 episodes	SCTV
2003	Senandung Masa Puber		Recurring role in season 3	Trans TV
2003–2005	Inikah Rasanya	Nadia	Main role in 2 seasons 98 episodes	SCTV
2004–2005	Ada Apa Denganmu	Anna/Nina	Main role 36 episodes	SCTV
2005	Anak Cucu Adam	Khalisa	Main role 88 episodes	RCTI
2005	Kumpul Bocah	Intan	Main role 5 episodes	SCTV
2005–2006	Bunga di Tepi Jalan	Bunga	Main role 58 episodes	RCTI
2005–2007	Pintu Hidayah		Off soap opera Several episodes	RCTI
2006	Bintang	Bintang	Main role 132 episodes	RCTI
2007	Pengantin Remaja	Amelda Dianti	Main role 43 episodes	RCTI
2007	Maha Cinta	Nessa	Episode: "Sisa Kenangan Terindah"	RCTI
2007	Maha Kasih		Off soap opera Several episodes	RCTI
2007	Baby Doll	Aurelie	Main role 11 episodes	RCTI
2007	Kakak Iparku 17 Tahun	Ayu/Dayu	Main role 8 episodes	RCTI
2007	Aisyah	Aisyah	Main role 102 episodes	RCTI
2008	Upik Abu dan Laura	Opie/Upik Abu	Main role 103 episodes	RCTI
2008–2009	Alisa	Alisa	Main role 124 episodes	RCTI
2009–2010	Kejora dan Bintang	Kejora	Main role 72 episodes	RCTI
2011	Lagu Cinta Nirmala	Nirmala	Main role 39 episodes	RCTI
2013	Yang Muda Yang Bercinta	Aliya Sofiani	Main role 94 episodes	RCTI
2014	Cinta Anak Cucu Adam	Khalisa	Main role 30 episodes	RCTI
2015	Sakinah Bersamamu	Riri	Main role 79 episode	RCTI
2017	Gali Lobang Tutup Lobang	Mimi	Main role 108 episodes	SCTV
2018	Cinta Kedua	Mutiara	Main role 51 episodes	SCTV
2018	Seleb	Cameo	46 episodes	SCTV
2019	Calon Presiden	Rohmah	Main role 46 episodes	SCTV
2019	Istri-Istri Akhir Zaman	Atika	Main role 30 episodes	SCTV
2019–2021	Samudra Cinta	Nita/Icha	673 episodes	SCTV
2021–2022	Cinta Amara	Miranti/Liza Febriyanti	Main Role 148 episodes	SCTV
Presenter
Year	Title	Role	Notes	Broadcast
2016–present	Berita Islami Masa Kini	Presenter		Trans TV
Film Television
Year	Title	Role	Notes	Broadcast
2013	Rohma Rohim	Rohma	Main role	RCTI
2013	Setelah Ibu Pergi	Icha	Main role	RCTI
2013	Menantu Bupati	Indah	Main role	RCTI
2013	Istriku, Ajari Aku Sholat	Aisah	Main role	RCTI
2013	Calon Menantu Palsu	Yani	Main role	RCTI
2013	Rumah yang Yahud	Nina	Main role	RCTI
2017	Kenapa Cinta Harus Memilih	Anisa	Main role	SCTV
2017	Di Antara Dua Ibu	Imay	Main role	SCTV

== Discography ==
=== Soundtrack album ===
- Ost. Bayangan Adinda (2003)

=== Mini album ===
- Cerita Cinta Kita (2010)
