= Kung Fu Zombie =

1981 Hong Kong film by Hwa I Hung

- 烏龍天師招積鬼; Wu long tian shi zhao ji gui
- Directed by: Hwa I Hung
- Written by: Hwa I Hung
- Story by: Wong Ying
- Produced by: Pal Ming
- Starring: Billy Chong; Chan Lau; Chang Tao; Cheng Ka Ying; Kwon Young Moon; Pak Sha Lik; Shum Yan Chi
- Production company: The Eternal Film Company
- Distributed by: The Eternal Film Company
- Release date: 1 October 1981
- Running time: 95 minutes
- Country: Hong Kong
- Language: Cantonese

Kung Fu Zombie is a 1981 comedy-themed Hong Kong martial arts film written and directed by Hwa I Hung. It stars Billy Chong as a martial artist who must fight supernatural foes.

In the film, a thug is killed by the zombies which he planned to use in a revenge scheme. Various attempts to resurrect him, result first in the accidental creation of a vampire, and secondly in two spirits inhabiting the same body.

== Plot ==
Pang, a martial artist, foils a robbery and sends thug Lu Dai to jail. Desiring revenge, Lu returns to the town and hires Wu Lung, a Taoist priest, to raise several zombies to fight Pang. The plan backfires when Lu is killed by his own trap. His ghost then haunts the priest and demands to be resurrected.

Kwan Wei Long, a serial killer, enters the town looking to duel with Pang and is seemingly killed by him. Happy to find a suitable corpse, Wu Lung attempts to put Lu Dai's spirit into Long's body. Long, however, is so evil that he is reanimated as a free-willed vampire.

When Pang's father dies, the priest uses his corpse to host Lu's spirit, but the ceremony is interrupted, and the thug and Pang's father share control of the body. Pang must now defeat the vampire and his father's possessed corpse.

== Cast ==
- Billy Chong as Pang
- Chan Lau as Wu Lung
- Chang Tao as Fong
- Cheng Ka Ying as Lu Dai
- Kwon Young Moon as Kwan Wei Long
- Pak Sha Lik
- Shum Yan Chi

== Release ==
Kung Fu Zombie was released in 1981 in Hong Kong and 1982 in the US. Ground Zero released it in the US on DVD in 2002.

== Reception ==
J. Doyle Wallis of DVD Talk rated it 3.5/5 stars and called it "pure, cheap, unadulterated, stupid fun". Todd Rigney of Beyond Hollywood called it "an obvious rip-off" of Encounters of the Spooky Kind that approaches the fun of The Evil Dead and Braindead. In Horror and Science Fiction Films III, Donald C. Willis called it "95 minutes of pure silliness". The Encyclopedia of Martial Arts Movies called it "a very unusual, funny film". In The Zombie Movie Encyclopedia, Peter Dendle wrote, "The speeded-up cinematography of martial arts action sequences always gives zombies in East Asian cinema a novel, charismatic twist." Brian Thomas, who wrote VideoHound's Dragon, said, "[F]or the most part, this has all the dumb spirit of a ninja movie with the added bonus of horror and gore!"
