= Marriage in Indonesia =

Marriage in Indonesia is carried out by one sacred recipient man and one woman with the intention of formalizing the marriage bond according to religious norms, legal norms, and social norms.

== Conditions of marriage by law ==
Based on Article 6 of Law no. 1/1974 concerning marriage, the conditions for getting married are things that must be met if a marriage is going to be held. These conditions are:

- There is agreement from both parties.
- For those who are not yet 21 years old, they must obtain permission from both parents. Or if one of the parents has died or is unable to express his will, then permission can be obtained from the parent who is still alive or the parent who is able to express his will.
- If the parents have died or are unable to express their will, then permission is obtained from the guardian, the person who maintains it or a family who is related by blood in a straight line of descent.

For those who are Muslim, in marriage there must be (Article 14 of the Compilation of Islamic Law (KHI):

- Future wife
- Future husband
- Guardian of marriage
- Two witnesses
- Ijab and kabul

== Religious marriage ==
=== Islam ===
Marriage in Islam is a human nature and is a worship for a Muslim to be able to perfect his faith and religion. Marriage has the greatest benefit over other social interests. The social interests are maintaining the continuity of the human species, continuing the offspring, launching sustenance, maintaining honor, maintaining public safety from all kinds of diseases that can endanger human life and maintaining peace of mind.

Marriage has a very noble goal, namely to form a happy, eternal family based on God Almighty. This is in accordance with the formulation contained in Law Number 1 of 1974 article 1 that: "Marriage is an outer and inner bond between a woman and a man as husband and wife with the aim of forming a happy and eternal family (household) based on the One Godhead. Almighty."

In marriage, there is a bond between birth and adhan. In marriage, it is always associated with the teachings of each religion and belief which has long provided the rules for how the marriage should be carried out.

In terms of Islam, the conditions for a valid marriage are very important, especially to determine since when it is permissible for a man and a woman to have sexual relations so that they are free from adultery. In Islam, adultery is a major sin. In Indonesia, where the majority of the population is Muslim, Islamic law greatly influences the moral attitude and legal awareness of the people.

Islam uses a simple marriage tradition, with the aim that a person is not trapped or fallen into adultery. This simple procedure seems to be in line with Law Number 1 of 1974 article 2 paragraph 1 which reads: "Marriage is legal if it is carried out according to the laws of each religion and belief." From this article, it seems that it provides opportunities for elements of customary law to follow and even integrate with Islamic law in marriage. In addition, it is caused by the awareness of the people who want it so. One of the customary marriage procedures that is still visible today is marriage that is not registered with the authorized official or is called siri marriage. This marriage is only carried out in front of a marriage officiant or religious expert by fulfilling Islamic law so that this marriage is not registered at the office authorized for it.

Marriage is valid if it meets the pillars and conditions of marriage. The pillars of marriage include the following:

- The parties who carry out the marriage contract are the bride and groom.
- The existence of a contract (sighat) is a word from the female guardian or her representative (ijab) and is accepted by the male party or his representative (kabul).
- There is a guardian of the prospective wife.
- There are two witnesses.

If any of these conditions are not met then the marriage is considered invalid, and it is considered that there has never been a marriage. Therefore, it is forbidden for him who does not fulfill these pillars to have sexual relations or all religious prohibitions in association. Thus, if the four pillars have been fulfilled, the marriage is considered valid.

The above marriage according to Islamic law is considered valid, if the marriage is connected with the provisions of Law Number 1 article 2 paragraph 2 of 1974 concerning Marriage which reads: "Every marriage is recorded according to the applicable laws and regulations."

It is emphasized in the same law in article 7 paragraph 1 which states that marriage is only permitted if the man reaches the age of 19 years and the woman has reached the age of 16 years. If you are still not old enough, Article 7 paragraph 2 explains that a marriage can be legalized by requesting a dispensation from the court or other official requested by both the parents of the man or woman.

=== Protestant Christianity ===
In Protestant Christian marriage ceremonies, marriage is a gift from God and this gift seen as solidarity between husband and wife. Marriage is sacred. A man and a woman form a household because they are united by God. They are no longer two, but one.

In principle, the meaning of marriage in Protestant Christianity has the same meaning, but the rites and regulations are different. Marriage regulations are looser or not as strict and complex as in Catholic Christian marriages.

== Marriage annulment ==
=== Parties who can apply for an annulment of marriage ===
Based on Article 23 of Law no. 1 of 1974, the following are parties that can apply for an annulment of marriage with a predetermined time limit, six months after the marriage takes place:

- Families in a straight line of descent from husband or wife.
- Husband or wife.
- The official who is authorized only as long as the marriage has not been decided.
- Court officials.

Article 73 of the KHI states that those who can apply for annulment of marriage are:

- The families in the lineage are straight up and down from the husband or wife.
- Husband or wife.
- The official authorized to supervise the implementation of marriage according to the law.

=== Reason for marriage annulment ===
Marriage can be annulled if:

- Marriages are carried out under threats that violate the law contained in Article 27 of Law no. 1/1974.
- One of the parties falsifies his identity (article 27 of Law No. 1/1974). False identities for example about status, age and religion.
- Husband/wife who still has marital ties to marry without the permission and knowledge of the other party (Article 24 of Law No. 01 of 1974).
- Marriage that is not in accordance with the conditions of marriage (article 22 of the Marriage Law).

Meanwhile, according to Article 71 of the KHI, a marriage can be annulled if:

- A husband practices polygamy without the permission of the religious court.
- The woman who was married was later found to be the wife of another man who was mafqud (missing).
- The woman who is married turns out to be still in the iddah period of another husband.
- Marriage violates the marriage age limit, as stipulated in Article 7 of Law No. 1 of 1974.
- Marriage is carried out without a guardian or carried out by an illegitimate guardian.
- Marriage is enforced by force.

=== Application for marriage annulment ===
Applications for annulment of marriage can be submitted to courts (religious courts for Muslims and district courts for non-Muslims) in the jurisdiction where the marriage has taken place or at the place of residence of the spouse (husband and wife). Or it could be in the residence of one of the new couples. With a record of annulment of marriages for Muslims, marriages for non-Muslims a maximum of six months after the sacred marriage, Islamic marriage.

== Wedding ceremonies ==
In Indonesia, the wedding ceremony is carried out in two ways, traditional and modern. Sometimes the bride and groom use both methods, usually in two separate ceremonies.

=== Traditional ceremonies ===
The traditional wedding ceremony is carried out according to local customary rules. Indonesia has many tribes, each of which has its own wedding ceremony tradition. In a mixed marriage, the bride and groom usually choose one of the customs, or sometimes the two customs are used in separate events.

=== Modern ceremonies ===
Modern wedding ceremonies are carried out by following the styles of foreign countries. The style used is European style and typically sophisticated. Marriages carried out according to Islamic rules may also be included in the category of modern wedding ceremonies.

== Traditional wedding ceremony in Indonesia ==
=== Java (Surakarta) wedding ceremony ===
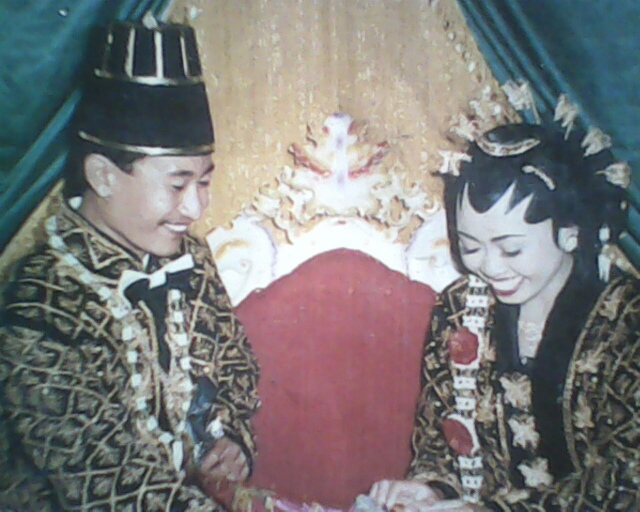
Javanese wedding

==== Nontoni ====
Nontoni is a ceremony to see the potential partner to be married. In the past, people who are getting married do not necessarily know the person they are going to marry or have never even seen it, although it is also possible that they already know or have seen each other.

In order to have an idea of who the match will be, the Nontoni procedure is held. Usually this procedure is initiated by the men. After the parents of the man who will be arranged marriages have sent their investigation about the condition of the girl who will be made daughter-in-law. This investigation is called dom sumuruping banyu or secret investigation.

After the results of this nontoni are satisfactory, and the male is able to accept the choice of his parents, then a discussion is held among the parents to determine the procedure for proposal.

==== Marriage proposal ceremony ====
On the day of the marriage proposal that has been set, the parents of the groom-to-be come with gifts. In ancient times, what was commonly called Jodang (a place for food and so on) was carried by four men.

The food that is brought is glutinous-based food which has a meaning as the nature of the glutinous raw material which has a lot of gluten so that it is sticky and it is hoped that in the future the two brides and inter-besan will stay together.

After the wedding proposal is received, then both parties negotiate a good day to carry out the peningsetan ceremony.

==== Tarub ceremony ====
Tarub is a decoration of yellow janur (young coconut leaves) attached to the edge of a tratag made of bleketepe (woven green coconut leaves).

The installation of the tarub is usually installed at the same time as bathing the bride and groom (siraman, Javanese), which is one day before the wedding is held.

==== Nyantri ====
The nyantri ceremony is to entrust the groom to the bride's family 1 to 2 days before the wedding. The groom will be placed at the house of relatives or close neighbors.

This nyantri ceremony is intended to make the wedding ceremony run smoothly, so that when the wedding ceremony is held, the groom is ready to be in place so that it does not bother the bride's family.

==== Siraman ====
Siraman ceremony from the word siram (Javanese) which means bathing. What is meant by siraman is to bathe the bride and groom which means to clean oneself to be holy and pure.

==== Midodareni ====
Midodareni comes from the word widodari (Javanese) which means daughter from heaven who is very beautiful and very fragrant.

Midodareni is usually held between 18.00 and 24.00. Also known as Midodareni Night, the bride and groom are not allowed to sleep.

==== Langkahan ====
Langkahan comes from the word langkah (Javanese) which means jump, the langkahan ceremony here is intended if the bride married before her unmarried sister or brother, then before the marriage contract begins, the bride and groom are required to ask permission from the older sister or older brother who was stepped over.

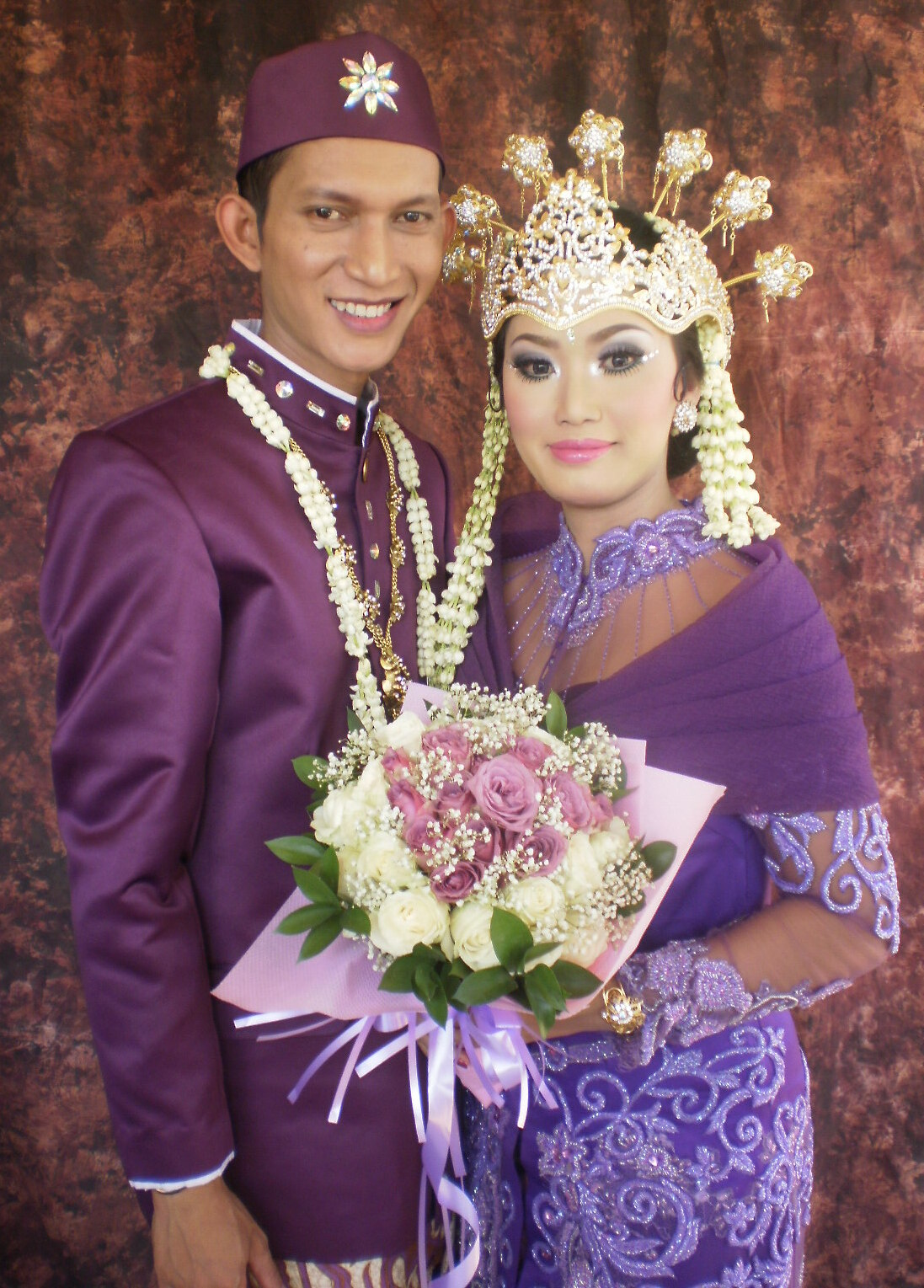
Sundanese wedding

==== Ijab ====
Ijab or ijab kabul is the ratification of a marriage according to the religion of the bride and groom. Traditionally, in this ceremony, the bride's family gives/marries their child to the groom, and the groom's family receives the bride and is accompanied by the delivery of wedding gold for the bride. The ijab qobul ceremony is usually led by an officer from the office of religious affairs so that the terms and conditions of the ijab qobul will be valid according to religious law and witnessed by government officials or civil registration officers who will record their marriage in the government records.

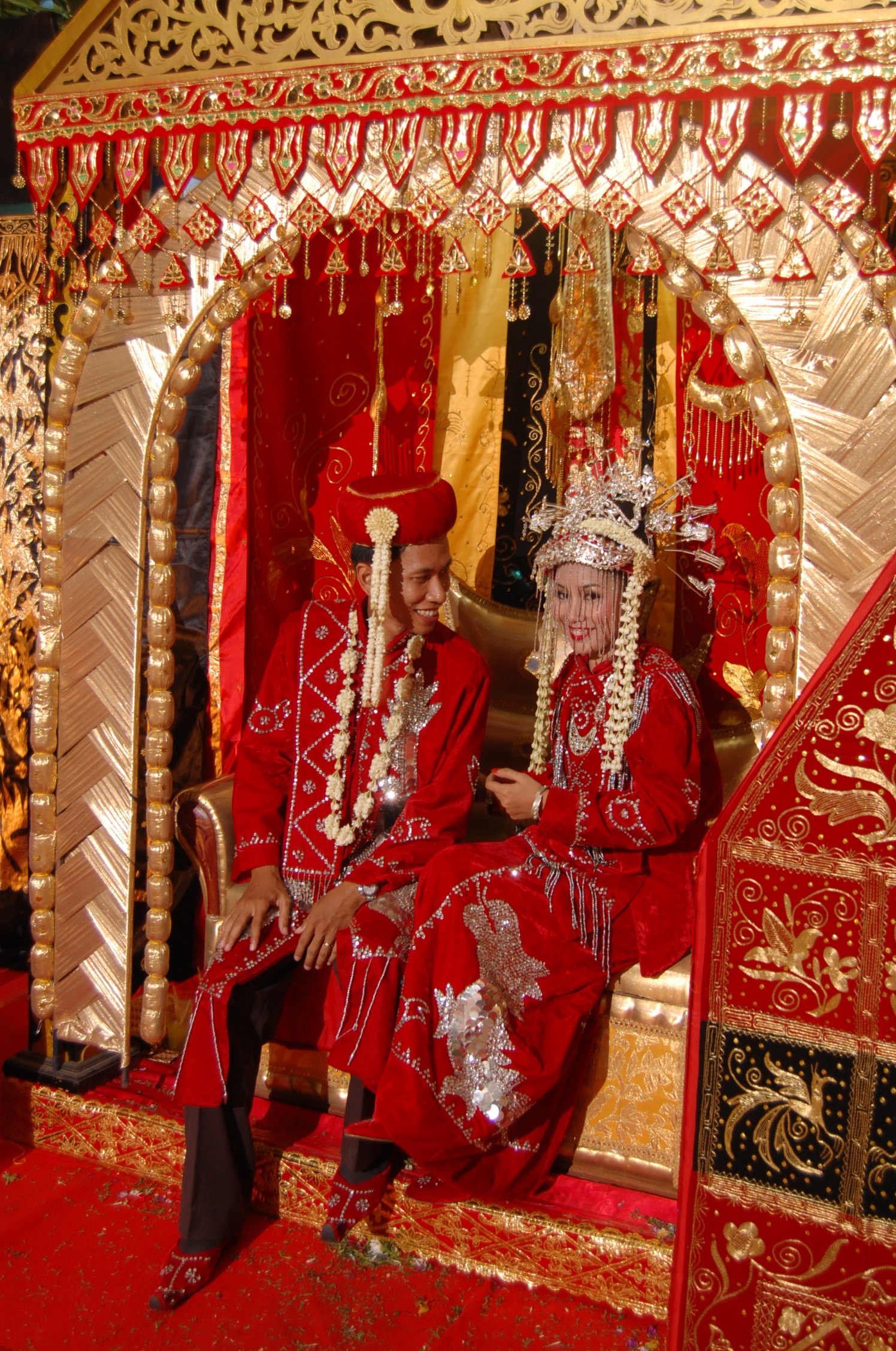
Betawi wedding

==== Panggih ====
Panggih (Javanese) means to meet, after the marriage ceremony is complete, the Panggih ceremony can be carried out. The groom returns to his waiting place, while the bride returns to the bridal chamber. After everything is ready, the Panggih ceremony can begin immediately.

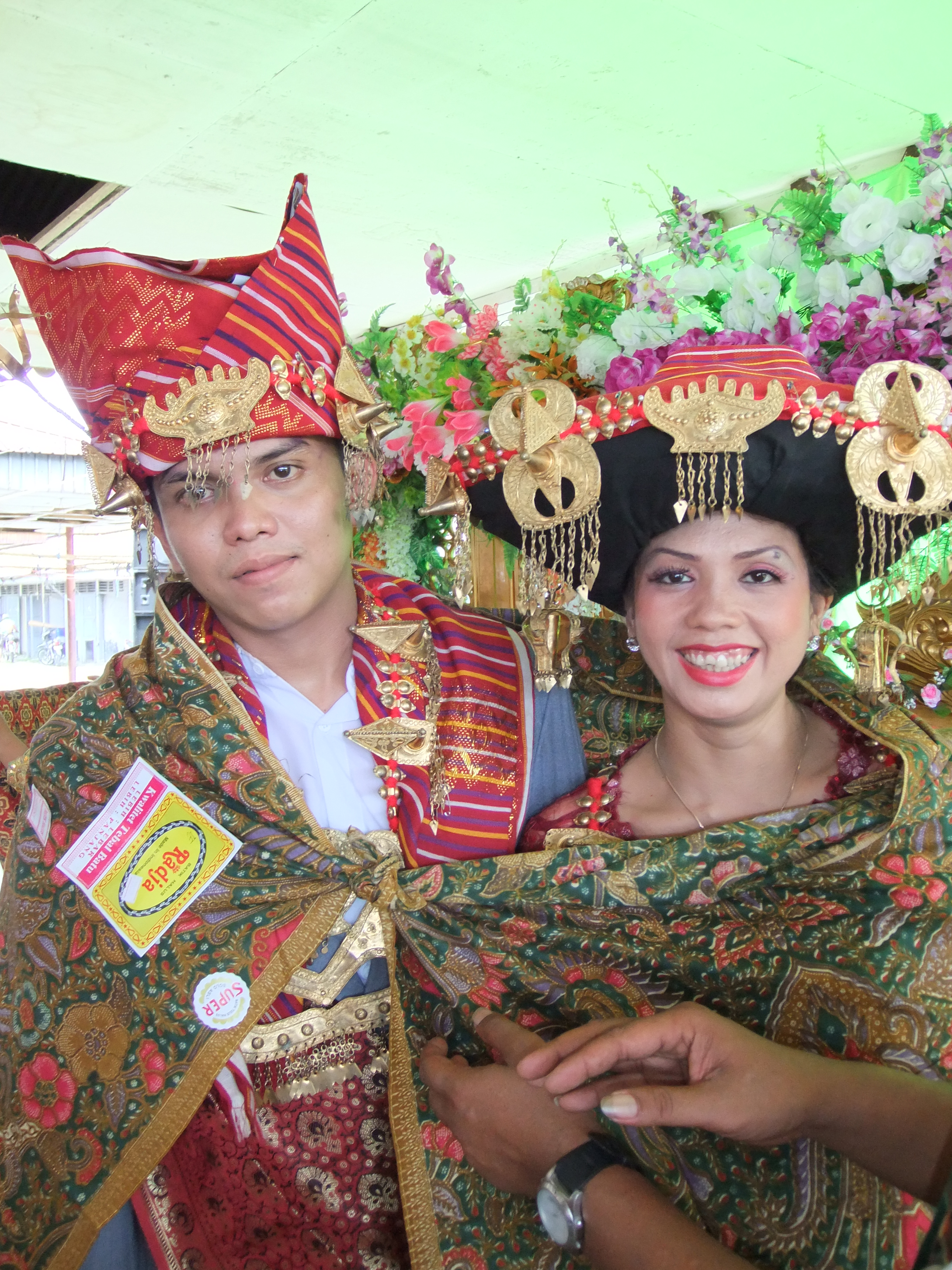
Batak wedding

=== Sunda wedding ceremony ===
Sundanese traditional weddings are currently more simplified, as a result of mixing with the provisions of Islamic law and "practical" values where "the bride" wants to be more simple.

The customs that are usually carried out include: worship (pengajian), siraman, "seren sumeren" for the bride and groom. Then sungkeman, "nincak endog” (stepping on eggs), "meuleum harupat" (burning seven sticks), "meupeuskeun kendi" (breaking a jug), sawer (given coins, yellow rice) and "ngaleupaskeun kanjut kunang" (releasing the coffers containing coins).

After the traditional ceremony ends, the bride and groom and their families rest to wait for the wedding reception or known as walimahan.

=== Betawi wedding ceremony ===
Betawi traditional weddings are marked by a series of processions. It was preceded by a period of introduction through Mak Comblang (Matchmaker). Continued with wedding proposal, siraman, the procession of cutting a cantung or scraping bat feathers with a coin that is flanked and then cut out. Henna night, the bride reddened her toenails and fingernails with henna.

The highlight of the Betawi wedding ceremony is the Akad Nikah.

=== Batak wedding ceremony ===
The Batak marriage custom contains sacred values. It is said to be sacred because in the understanding of Batak traditional marriage, it means sacrifice for the parboru (bride's family) because they "sacrifice" by giving a living human life, which is their daughter, to the paranak (the groom's family), so the groom family must also respect the bride by sacrificing/dedicating one's life as well, by slaughtering an animal (cow or buffalo), which then becomes a meal (traditional food) in the ceremony.
