= Willy Dozan =

Indonesian martial artist, actor and stuntman (born 1957)

- Born: Chuang Chen Li; 10 February 1957 (age 69); Magelang, Central Java, Indonesia
- Other name: Billy Chong
- Occupations: Celebrity; stuntman; fight choreographer; martial artist; director
- Years active: 1977–present
- Spouses: Betharia Sonata (m. 1990; div. 2002) Tini Kartini (m. 2004; div. 2004) Chika Revieta (m. 2007; div. 2008) Rumiyati Ningsih (m. 2010)

Willy Dozan, formerly known by his stage name Billy Chong (born Chuang Chen Li, 庄陈力; 10 February 1957) is an Indonesian martial artist, actor and stuntman. His acting career started in 1977 with Pembalasan Si Pitung (Pitung's Revenge). He pursued his career in Indonesia, Hong Kong and the United States. Some of the most notable roles are in Crystal Fist and A Fistful of Talons. In 1995, he became a household name in Indonesia after performing in Deru Debu, a popular TV series, for which he directed most of the episodes. He also starred in, directed and produced another hit TV series, Sapu Jagad (2000).

== Personal life ==
Dozan was born Chong Chan-li in Magelang, Central Java on 10 February 1959, to Chinese parents.

In 1990, Willy Dozan married Indonesian popstar Betharia Sonata. The couple has two children. Their son, Leon Dozan, is also an actor. Formerly a Christian, he converted to Islam prior to this marriage. The couple divorced in 2002. Dozan has married thrice and divorced twice since then.

== Partial filmography ==
=== Actor ===
- Target (2018)
- Go Go Girls (2011-2012) TV series (as Bramantyo)
- Zig Zag (2002) TV series (as Elang)
- Akhir Sebuah Cinta (2001) TV series
- Sapu Jagad (2000) TV series
- Deru Debu (1995) TV series (as Igo)
- Narkoba (1992)
- Rio Sang Juara (1989) (as Rio)
- Pernikahan Berdarah (1990)
- Aces Go Places 5: The Terracotta Hit (1990)
- A Fistful Of Talons (1983) (as Li)
- Pendekar Liar (1983)
- Kung Fu From Beyond The Grave (1982)
- Wu Long Tian Shi Zhao Ji Gui or Kung Fu Zombie (1981) (as Pang)
- Super Power (1980)
- Shou Zhi Niu Chu (1980) aka Kung Fu Executioner
- Crystal Fist (1979) aka Jade Claw
- Sun Dragon (1979) aka A Hard Way To Die
- Balada Dua Jagoan (1979)
- Invincible Monkey Fist (1978)
- Pembalasan si Pitung (1977)

=== Director ===
- Tanpa Saksi Mata (2003) TV series
- Zig Zag (2002) TV series
- 7 Tanda Cinta (2002) TV series
- Dari Mana Datangnya Cinta (2001) TV series
- Sapu Jagad (2000) TV series
- Deru Debu (1995) TV series
