= Revalina S. Temat =

Indonesian actress

Revalina Sayuthi Temat
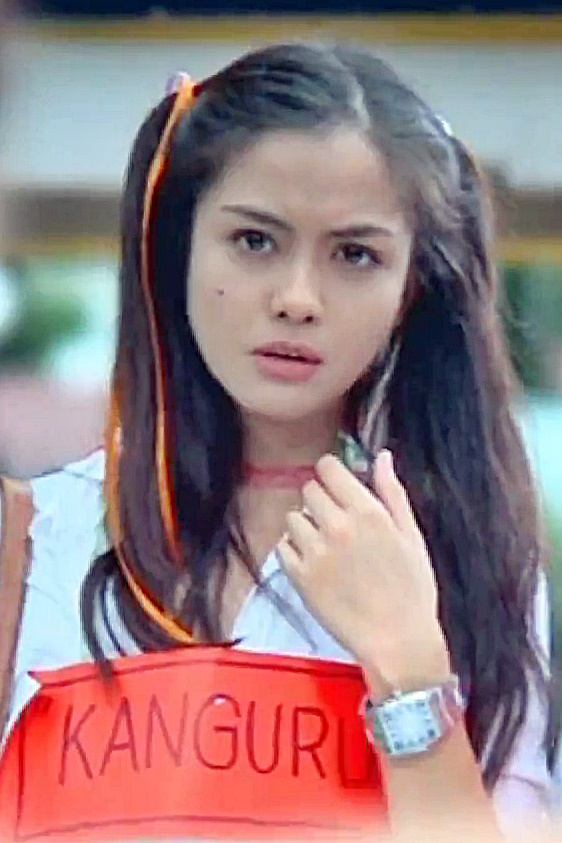
- Revalina Sayuthi Temat on Dikejar Brondong RCTI
- Born: Revalina Trinovianti; November 26, 1985 (age 40); Jakarta, Indonesia
- Other names: Revalina S. Temat; Revalina Trinovianti Sayuthi Temat; Revalina Trinovianti Gunawan (since 2015)
- Occupations: Celebrity; Model
- Spouse: Rendy Aditya Gunawan (m. 2015)
- Children: Rihga Sadiwasakti Rabbani; Rajendra Satya Razzani
- Parent(s): Sayuthi Temat (father); Rachmaniar (mother)

Revalina Trinovianti Sayuthi Temat, Revalina Trinovianti Gunawan or better known as Revalina S. Temat (born in Jakarta on 26 November 1985) is an Indonesian actress and model of mixed Malay and Minangkabau descent.

== Career ==
=== Early career ===
She started her career as a contestant on GADIS Sampul in 1999, then started to work as a model and as an actress in soap operas and films. She has appeared in the soap operas Percikan, Sangkuriang, Cintaku di Kampus Biru 2, and Bawang Merah Bawang Putih. She appeared in the films Pocong 2 (2006), and Perempuan Berkalung Sorban (2009), for which she was nominated for Citra Award for Best Leading Actress at the 2009 Indonesian Film Festival. She also starred in a drama collaboration between Indonesia and Korea entitled Saranghae I Love You, paired with Korean singer Tim Hwang.

== Filmography ==
=== Film ===
| Year | Title | Role | Notes |
|---|---|---|---|
| 2006 | Pocong 2 | Maya | Lead role |
| 2007 | Cintaku Forever | Flora | Lead role |
| 2008 | Oh My God | Tiara | Lead role |
| 2009 | Perempuan Berkalung Sorban | Anissa | Lead role Nominated - 2009 Indonesian Movie Awards for Best Actress; Won - Indonesian Movie Awards 2009 for Favorite Actress; Won - 2009 Festival Film Bandung for Best Leading Role Actress; Nominated - 2009 Indonesian Film Festival for Best Female Leading Role |
| 2009 | Wakil Rakyat | Ani | Lead role |
| 2010 | The God Babe | Ola | Lead role |
| 2010 | Red Cobex | Astuti | Supporting role |
| 2010 | Satu Jam Saja | Gadis | Lead role |
| 2011 | ? | Menuk | Lead role |
| 2011 | Semesta Mendukung | Mrs. Tari Hayat | Lead role |
| 2012 | Ummi Aminah | Rini | Supporting role |
| 2012 | Kita Versus Korupsi | Laras | Segment: "Aku Padamu" |
| 2013 | Wanita Tetap Wanita | Nurma | Supporting role |
| 2013 | Isyarat | Maya | Lead role |
| 2014 | Oo Nina Bobo | Karina | Lead role |
| 2014 | Hijrah Cinta | Pipik | Lead role |
| 2014 | Assalamualaikum Beijing | Asmara | Lead role |

=== TV Series ===
- Kupu-Kupu Ungu (1998)
- Suami, Istri & Dia (2000)
- Jinny oh Jinny (2001)
- Percikan (2001)
- Sangkuriang (2003)
- Cintaku di Kampus Biru 2 (2003 - 2004)
- JP (2004)
- Asyiknya Pacaran
- Bawang Merah Bawang Putih (2004)
- Dara Manisku
- Dicintai
- Kumpul Bocah
- Rahasia Perkawinan
- Hikmah 2
- Kembang Surga
- Cinta dengan Luka (2002) FTV
- Gerangan Cinta (2003) FTV
- Gara Gara Sofie Punya Mau
- " Saranghae, I Love You " (2012)
- Jangan Bercerai Bunda (2022)

== Music Videos ==
| Year Release | Title | Artist | Note |
|---|---|---|---|
| 1999 | "Kau" | Glenn Fredly | with Asri Welas |
| 2000 | "Kutahu Ragumu" | Roman | |
| 2001 | "Seribu Tahun Lamanya" | Jikustik | with Andhara Early and Bunga Citra Lestari |
| 2001 | "Indah, Kuingat Dirimu" | Yovie & Nuno | |
| 2002 | "(ATM) Aku Takkan Memiliki" | Caffeine | |
| 2003 | "Kupilih Dia" | Cokelat | |
| 2004 | "Lebih Dekat Denganmu Nanti (Juwita)" | Yovie & Nuno | |
| 2008 | "Kaulah Hidup dan Matiku" | NaFF | with Mario Lawalata |
| 2010 | "Sudahi Perih Ini" | d'Masiv | with Rendy Kjaernett |
| 2010 | "Letoy" | Blackout | with Julie Estelle, Carissa Putri, Asmirandah, Pevita Pearce, Arumi Bachsin and Tika Putri |

== TV Commercial ==
| Year | Title | Role | Notes |
|---|---|---|---|
| 1999 | Pewangi So Klin | Herself | Puncak version |
| 2000 | Indomie Chratz Mie | Herself | 2 version |
| 2002 | Clear | Herself | Sniper version |
| 2002 | Relaxa | Herself | Party version by DJ Winky Wiryawan |
| 2003 | Red A | Herself | 2 version |
| 2006–present | Charm Body Fit | Herself | All version |

== Awards and nominations ==
| Year | Award | Category | Recipients | Results |
|---|---|---|---|---|
| 2009 | Indonesian Movie Awards | Best Actress | Woman with a Turban | Nominated |
| 2009 | Indonesian Movie Awards | Favorite Actress | Woman with a Turban | Won |
| 2009 | Festival Film Bandung | Best Leading Role Actress | Woman with a Turban | Won |
| 2009 | Indonesian Film Festival | Citra Award for Best Leading Actress | Woman with a Turban | Nominated |
| 2012 | Maya Awards | Best Actress in an Omnibus | Kita Versus Korupsi | Nominated |
| 2012 | Bintang RPTI Awards | Favorite Actress | Saranghae I Love U | Nominated |
| 2014 | Indonesian Choice Awards | Actress of the Year | Revalina S. Temat | Nominated |
| 2014 | Indonesian Film Festival | Citra Award for Best Leading Actress | Hijrah Cinta | Nominated |
| 2014 | Maya Award | Best Actress in a Leading Role | Hijrah Cinta | Nominated |
| 2016 | Infotainment Awards | Most Phenomenal Celebrity Wedding | Revalina S. Temat & Rendy Aditya | Nominated |
