= Helsi Herlinda =

Indonesian television actress

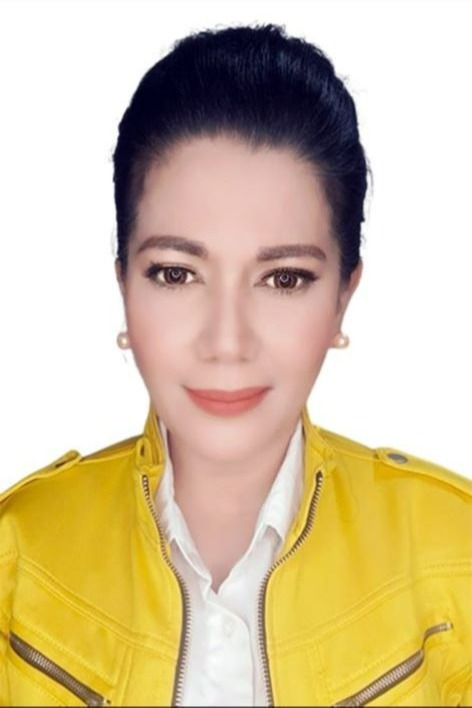
- Born: 19 March 1974 (age 52); Jakarta, Indonesia
- Occupations: Actress; model; presenter; producer
- Years active: 1993–present
- Spouse: Agung B. Susanto (m. 2008)
- Children: Syifa Chalisia
- Parent(s): H. Amril Adam; Hj. Asni Syam

Helsi Herlinda (born 19 March 1974) is an Indonesian television actress, model, executive producer, and presenter. Herlinda was well known by the public for her role as an antagonist in RCTI's popular show Bawang Merah Bawang Putih which aired from 2004 to 2005.

== Career ==
She is known for antagonist roles in soap operas. In addition to soap opera features, she also performs as a commercial model and presenter on some television channels. Currently, she is also busy with preparing her first album. She has starred in soap operas like Bawang Merah Bawang Putih, Namaku Mentari, Taqwa, and Cinta Bunga 2. One of the protagonist role was played by herself entitled Tasbih Cinta as Juleha. On 2014, she starred in a drama musical film, Suka-Suka Super 7 & Idola Cilik: Habis Gelap Menuju Terang. In this film, she takes a protagonist role and stars with Coboy Junior's former member, Bastian Steel, Mike Lewis, and Denada.

In June 2014, when she met at Pasar Baru, Central Jakarta, she admitted that she wanted to get awards as filmmakers. She comments by saying:

"Everyday, I did as protagonist role. So it could still be overtaken. Just a matter of character. If it fits as protagonist, how sadly let fluent. Ya, as good as acting to antagonist, I also want to be the protagonist. I want to be able to get award through the protagonist."

Previously, she also admitted her worry that she swerved to be the protagonist role in the film. She comments by saying:

"I briefly worry about aren't the public accept, I become to protagonist role. If the producer ya okay and accept. Just from me only. Hopefully, can be accepted from the public."

== Controversy ==
Herlinda is an artist who often exposed cases of persecution by people and fans due to her antagonist role. In June 2008, Herlinda was rumored to have been mistreated by her husband, causing bruises on her eyes. The rumor had been denied by her, and she admitted that it was just an ordinary accident.

== Personal life ==
Herlinda was born on March 19, 1974, in Jakarta. Herlinda is the third child of 7 siblings of H. Amril Adam (alm) and Asni Syam. Herlinda is married to a property businessman, Agung B. Susanto, and has two children.

== Filmography ==
=== Film ===
Year	Title	Role	Notes
2009	Emak Ingin Naik Haji	Ziah	
2014	Suka-Suka Super7 & Idola Cilik: Habis Gelap Menuju Terang		

=== Television ===
Year	Title	Role	Notes	Ref(s).
1995	Pondok Pak Djon 2	Vega		
1998	Dua Sisi Mata Uang			
2002	Bidadari 2	Ira		
2004	Hikmah	Jessy		
2004–2005	Sitti Nurbaya	Mila		
2004–2006	Bawang Merah Bawang Putih	Rika Sumanto		
2005	Hidayah	Inem Satiyem	Episode: Kisah Tragis Nenek Penjudi	
2005	Taubat	Marini	Episode: Wanita Pembakar Rumah	
2006	Taqwa	Yona		
2006	Rahasia Pelangi	Vicky		
2006	Pintu Hidayah		Episode: Cinta yang Terpilih	
2007	Cinta Bunga	Rossania		
2008	Namaku Mentari	Wanda		
2008	Tasbih Cinta	Julaeha		
2009	Cinta Bunga 2	Rossania		
2009	Tangisan Issabela	Ratna		
2009–2010	Hafizah	Thalita		
2010	Sinar	Wati		
2010	Titip Rindu			
2010–2011	Putri yang Ditukar	Farah		
2011	Cahaya Cinta	Camelia		
2012	Insya Allah Ada Jalan	Herself	Guest	
2012	Bukan Salah Takdir	Nessa		
2012	Takdir Cintaku	Kanti		
2012	Mencari Jejak Bunda			
2015	Samson dan Dahlia	Lesa		
2015	Cinta di Langit Taj Mahal 2	Samsiah		
2016	Senandung	Diana		
2017	Hati yang Memilih	Sofia		
2018	Tangis Kehidupan Wanita	Liana	Episodic role, Episode 8	
2019	Jodoh Wasiat Bapak	Larsi	Episodic role, Episode 1039	
2020	Ratapan Ibu Tiri	Asih		
2021	Jodoh Wasiat Bapak Babak 2	Endang	Episodic role, Episode 45	
2021	Jodoh Wasiat Bapak Babak 2	Esti	Episodic role, Episode 139	
2021	Jodoh Wasiat Bapak Babak 2	Ningsih	Episodic role, Episode 297	
2021	Butir-Butir Pasir di Laut	Sonya		
2021	Berbagi Suami the Series	Lydia		
2022	Suami Pengganti	Devi Wiraguna		
2023	Jodoh Wasiat Bapak 3	Linda	Episodic role, Episode 15	
2023	Tajwid Cinta	Dewi		
