= Raden (disambiguation) =

Raden is Japanese decorative craft.

Raden may also refer to:

- Raden, title of Javanese nobility
- Aja Raden, American author, historian, scientist and jewelry designer
- Nikola Rađen, Serbian water polo player
- Suyadi, Indonesian animator, puppeteer and television presenter also known as Pak Raden
- Juufuutei Raden, Japanese VTuber
