= Abdul Hamid (voice actor) =

Indonesian voice actor and puppeteer (1948–2022)

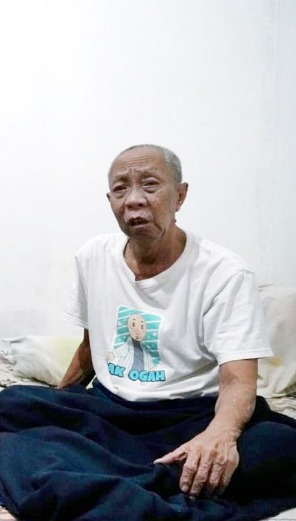
- Hamid in 2022
- Born: 3 December 1948; Jakarta, Indonesia
- Died: 28 December 2022 (aged 74); Bekasi, Indonesia
- Occupations: Voice actor; puppeteer
- Years active: 1981–2022

Abdul Hamid (3 December 1948 – 28 December 2022), or more popularly known by the name of his puppet character Pak Ogah, was an Indonesian voice actor and puppeteer. He is best known for his portrayal of the lazy unemployed character Pak Ogah in Si Unyil. His character became popular and became an icon among Indonesian children, along with other characters from the show. He died on 28 December 2022, after suffering from several complications from a stroke.

== Early life and career ==
Abdul Hamid was born on 3 December 1948 in Jakarta. He started his career at first not as a voice actor but rather as a repairman, later becoming part of the film crew. He also owned a studio in Ismail Marzuki Park, where he later met his wife. He then started voicing minor characters from the show Si Unyil, which started in 1981, such as a thief and Meilani's grandfather, a character in the show that represented Chinese Indonesians. The creator of the show, Suyadi, saw his manner and decided to make a character based on his appearance, which became Pak Ogah. The character is known for his lazy manner and his habit of asking or begging people for money, refusing to do work, and sitting all day inside the neighborhood's security post. The original show continued airing until 1993 on state-owned television, TVRI. His character, Pak Ogah, became popularly known as a depiction of lazy people with his catchphrase "Cepek dulu dong" when asking for money from others. This name was later applied by Indonesians to illegal parking attendants, who often showed up out of nowhere and asked for money.

He continued to play the character in various shows, including Warkop DKI's movie Malu Malu Mau in 1988 and as a guest star in Lorong Waktu 3 in 2002. He, together with Suyadi, who also voiced another character, Pak Raden, brought the character to various shows and visited schools to do storytelling for children. In 2011, Trans TV made a show centered around Pak Ogah, Ogah Ngeyel, which presented him encountering misfortunes despite trying to do good things. The show ran for 16 episodes, and he went back to voicing in Si Unyil, which underwent many changes throughout the years. His last role was voicing Pak Ogah in Si Unyil's spinoff series Laptop Si Unyil, a role he played from 2007 to 2021, before his death.

== Illness and death ==
Despite the fame he received as Pak Ogah, his family said that he experienced financial hardships and often relied on donations from other people. His earnings were dwindling, and he did several gigs and side jobs as a presenter at kids' birthday parties or other gathering events. He was hospitalized in 2016 after he suffered a stroke caused by arterial blockage in his brain. He was later also diagnosed with Alzheimer's, chronic stomach ulcer, kidney stone, and gallstone. He suffered a second stroke in October 2022.

On 28 December 2022, Hamid died at Kartika Husada Hospital, Bekasi, at age 74.
