= Mother-of-pearl carving in Bethlehem =

Traditional handicraft in the Holy Land

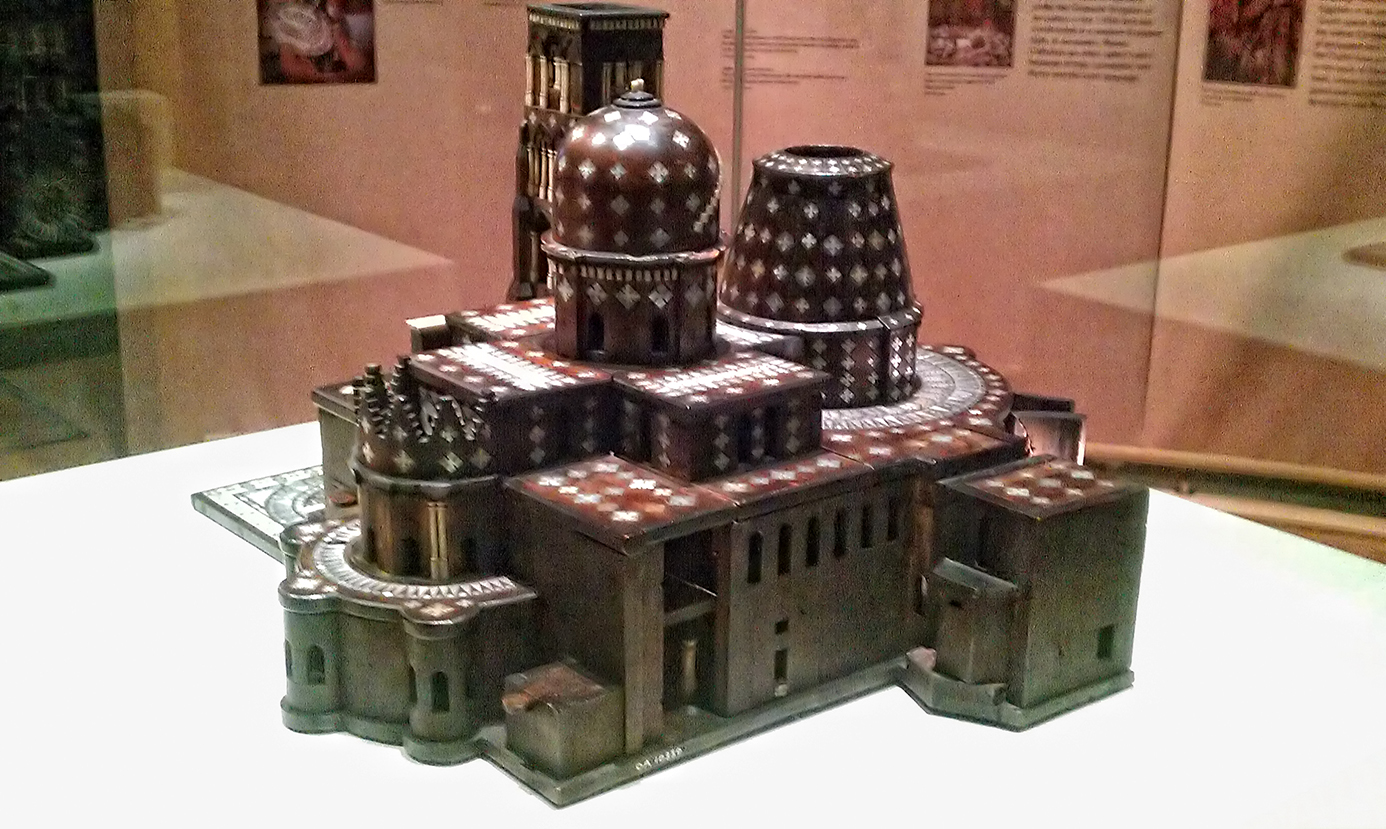
Model of the Church of the Holy Sepulchre, made in Bethlehem, probably late 1600s. In the British Museum

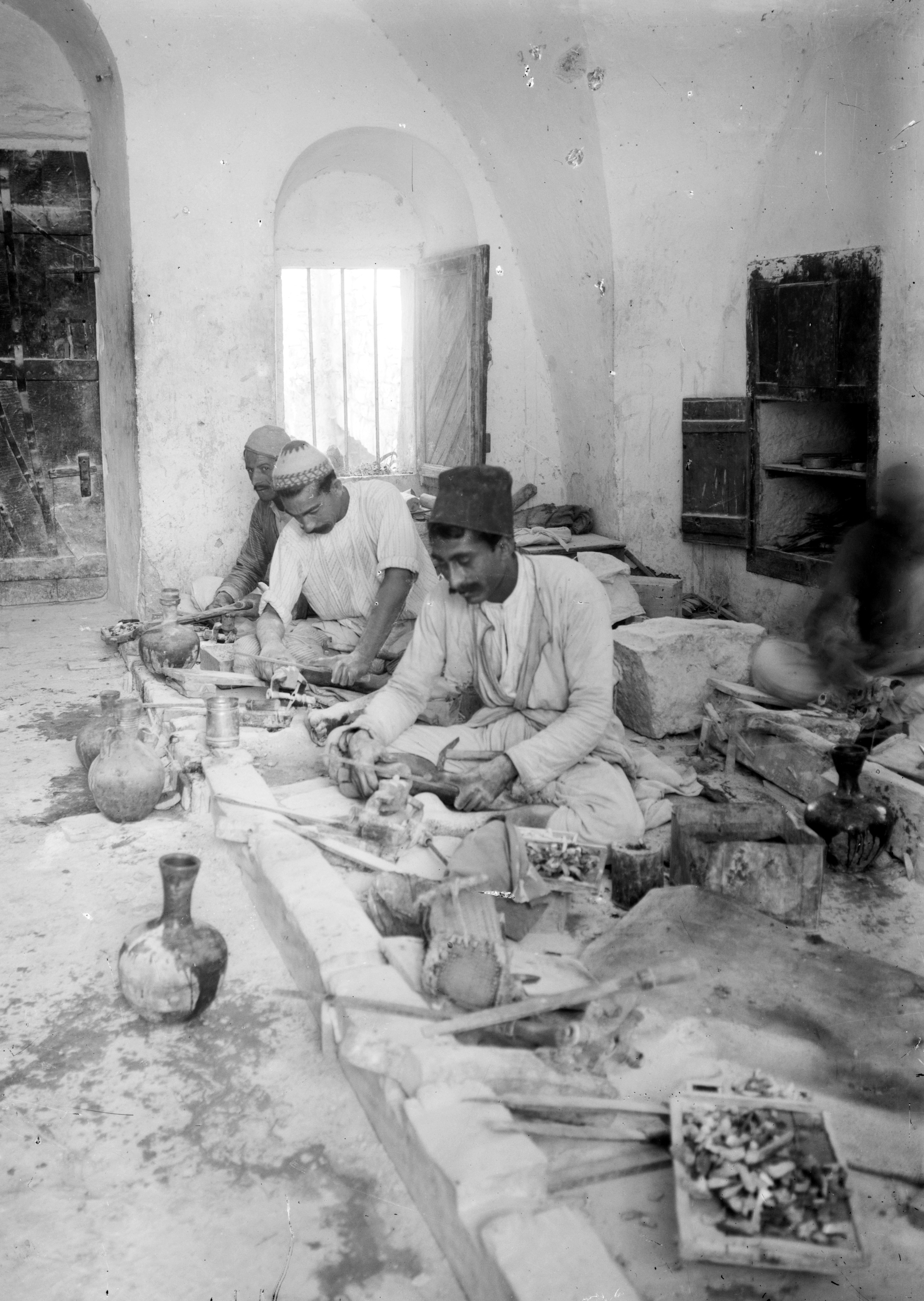
Workers in mother-of-pearl in Bethlehem. Photo taken 1900–1920 by American Colony, Jerusalem.

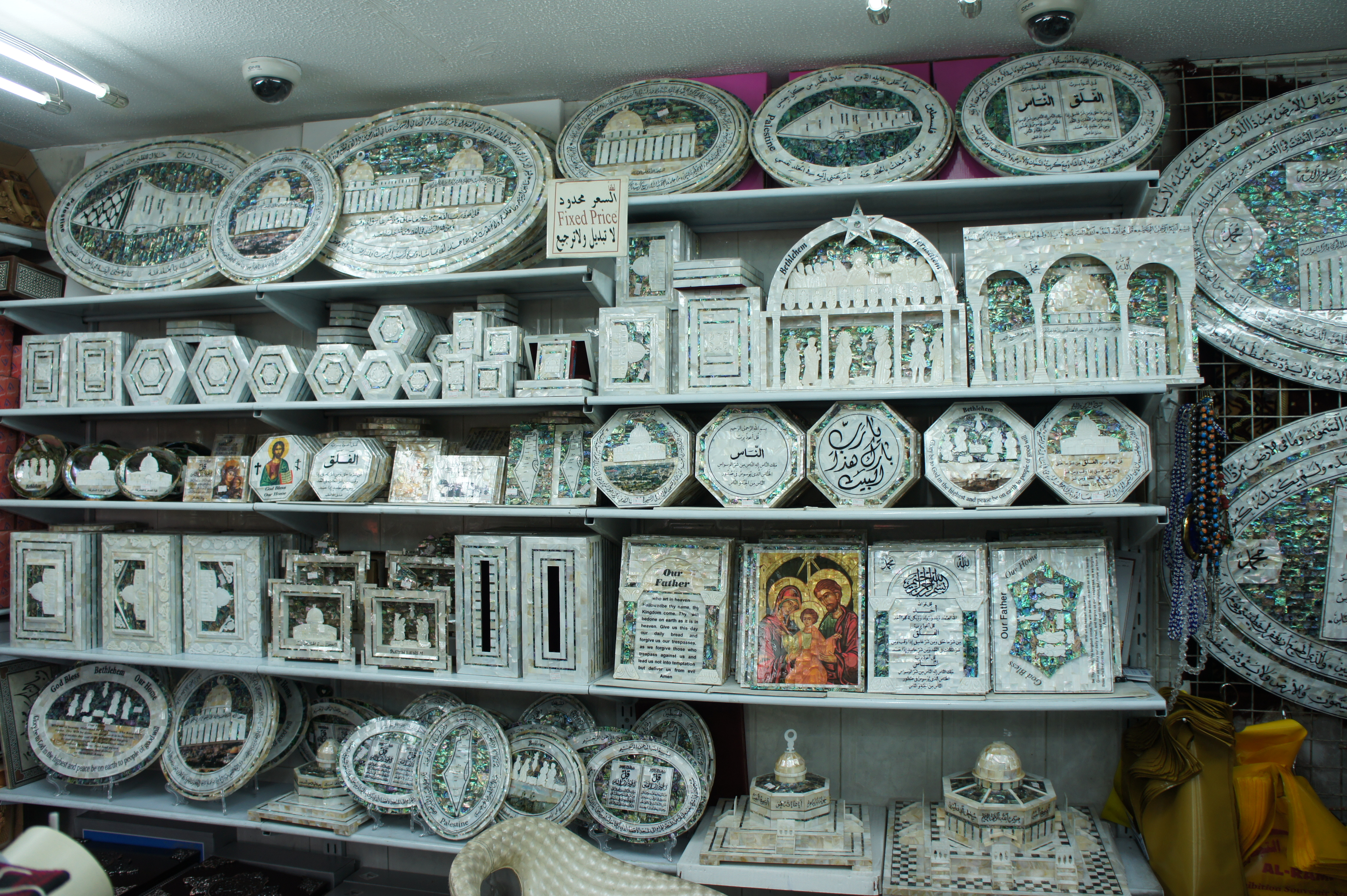
Mother-of-pearl work from Bethlehem, as seen in a shop in Ramallah, 2012

Mother-of-pearl carving is a traditional handicraft in Bethlehem, and is said to have been brought to the city by Franciscan friars from Italy in the 15th century.

== History ==
Bethlehem's position as an important Christian city has for centuries attracted a constant stream of pilgrims. This generated much local work and income, also for women, including making mother-of-pearl souvenirs. According to Weir, Bethlehem women's employment in the mother-of-pearl industry goes back at least to the seventeenth century. It was noted by Richard Pococke, who travelled there in 1727.

The first exhibition in the west of mother-of-pearl artifacts from Palestine was at The World Fair in New York in 1852. Two brothers, Giries and Ibrahim Mansur, exhibited their work and were a great success.

Previously, most of the oysters for the mother-of-pearl supply came from the Red Sea. As of 2007 however, Australia, California, New Zealand and Brazil are the main exporters of the mother-of-pearl.

== See also ==
- Nacre
- Palestinian handicrafts
- Raden

== Bibliography ==
- Weir, Shelagh (1989). Palestinian Costume, London: British Museum Publications Ltd. ISBN 0-7141-2517-2. (exhibition catalog)
- Pococke, R. (1811): A General Collection of the Best and Most Interesting Voyages and Travels in All Parts of the World: Many of which are Now First Translated Into English, (Popocke starts at p. 406)
