= Najeonchilgi =

Korean handicraft

Najeonchilgi (Korean: 나전칠기, 螺鈿漆器, [nadʑʌntɕʰilɡi]) refers to a particular kind of Korean handicraft where various colourful and vibrant pieces of shellfish are inlaid on certain objects

== Etymology ==
The very term 'Najeonchilgi' is a combination of two particular words: 'najeon'– mother-of-pearl and ‘chilgi’ which refers to lacquerware. ‘Najeon’ refers to the composite material which forms the inner shiny shell layer. Korean craftsmen generally use the processed abalone shells.

== History and transformation ==
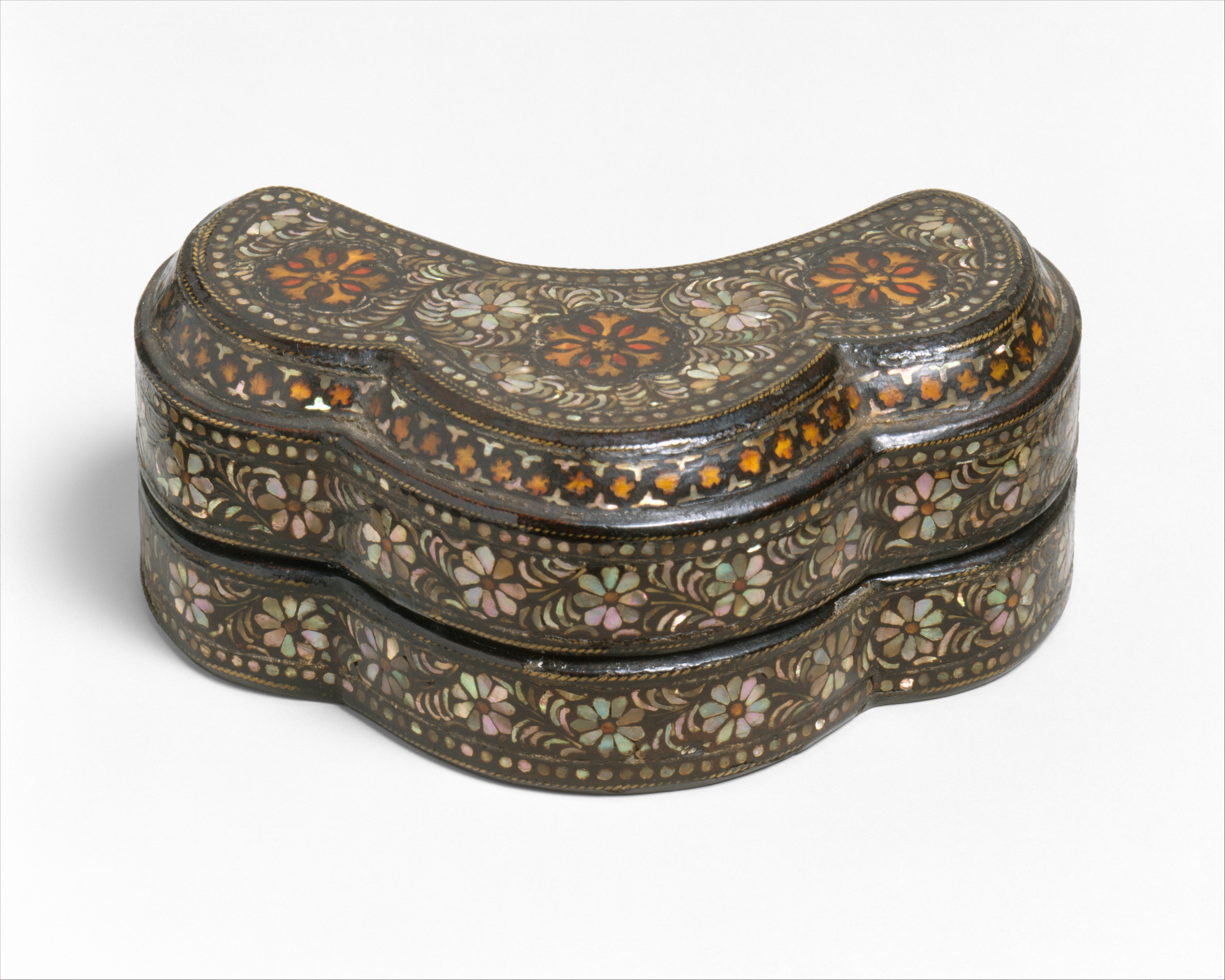
A box decorated with a chrysanthemum motif using the najeonchilgi lacquer and mother-of-pearl method.

While in ancient China was where it originated primarily, throughout the years, it has gained popularity across Japan where they call it raden, and South Korea.

‘Najeonchilgi’ combines two craft procedures — the method of lacquering wood and the mother-of-pearl lacquerware. The Three Kingdom period (57 B.C. – 668 A.D.) witnessed the introduction of the first method and the second one was introduced during the Silla period (668 A.D. – 935 A.D.). The Goryeo dynasty (918–1392), considered the golden period of this craft, was influenced by Buddhism. During that period, the crafted products were mostly owned by the aristocrats, due to mostly their intricate, magnificent and eloquent designs as well as abstract, beautiful patterns. The foreign delegates and overseas kingdoms used to receive the products as precious gifts. The possible influence of Confucianism during the Joseon dynasty (1392–1910) led to the inclusion of more simplistic nature-based designs. During the 16th century, the popularity of this craft further increased against the background of war-stricken Korea. The inclusion of scenes from daily lives of the commoners in addition to various plants, flowers or fruits managed to pique the interest of even the commoners. The time period between 1910 and 1945, Japan colonized Korea and obstructed the free prosperity of the trade. With Korea's independence, the craft began to flourish again and during the economic boom in the 60s and 70s, it began to symbolize Korean wealth. While the supply of the abalone shells began to dry up due to heavy demand, turban and pearl shells were imported from places such as Australia, Taiwan and the Philippines. During the 1980s, however, the extortionate price shrunk the market to a great extent.

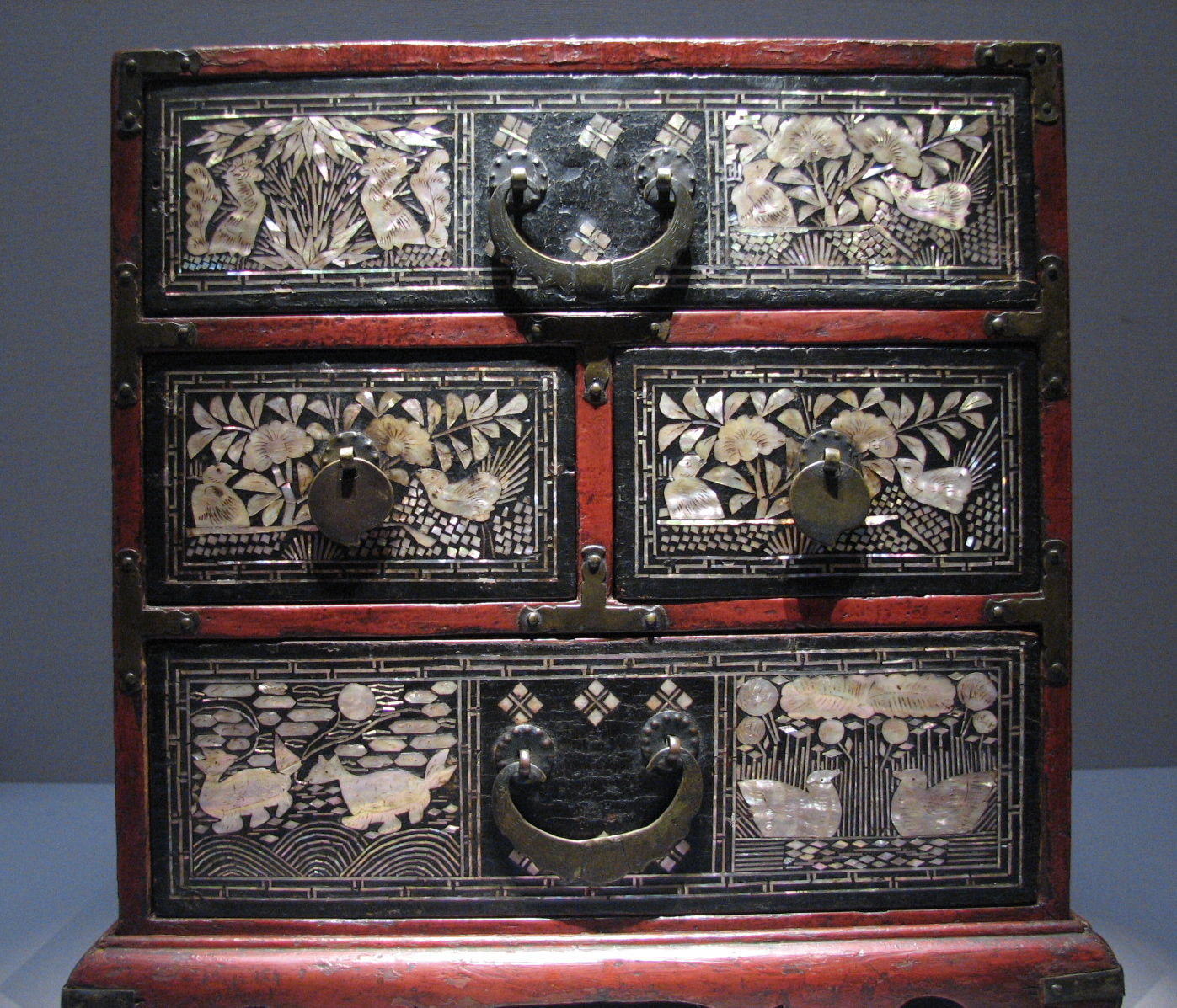
Example of najeonchilgi from the Joseon Period at the National Museum of Korea, Seoul

== Process ==
Magnificent skills, eye for detailed beauty and immense patience are the three most important qualities associated with the craftsmen of ‘Najeonchilgi’. The procedure includes more than thirty elaborate steps. Firstly, materials like wood, thick layers of glued paper, metal, porcelain are used to create a base. This method is followed by filling the gaps within the base with “saengot” or a fresh paint made from clay and the lacquer tree resin. After that, pieces of the mother-of-pearl get pasted on the base surface. Those pieces are cut in two ways which includes- “Jureumjil” or “filling” and “ggeuneumjil” or “cutting”. Finally, the entire piece gets polished, lacquered and smooth. During modern days, the mass production as well as newer materials such as cashew lacquer instead of otchil, sometimes create hindrance in terms of durability and authenticity.

== Usage ==
There are many important usages of the "najeonchilgi" products. Initially the products were used as gifts to the foreign associates and the rulers. It is applied in the art of making furniture, decorative jewellery boxes, bookmarks, mirrors, combs, several accessories such as, earrings, bracelets, necklaces, brooches, hair accessories, water bottles, phone cases and so on. Earlier, when it used to be strictly associated with wealthy noble families, it was used to make stationary chests, smaller dining tables, hairdressing accessory chests, plates and bowls, trays and smaller wardrobes, etc.

== Modern day master creators ==
Kim Young-jun - Contemporary najeonchilgi artist who left his job as a stock analyst in 1994, devoting himself to the study and production of najeonchilgi that matched with contemporary lifestyles.

Kim Sungsoo - Director of the Ottchil Art Museum (Tongyeong) and contemporary ottchil master whose work in the collection of Seoul Museum of Art and Beijing Arts, Crafts Museum. He taught at Hongik University, Sookmyung Women's University, Tsinghua University, and Dongbang University.

Other contemporary master creators include Song Bang-woong, Sohn Dae-hyun, Jeung Myung-chae, Han Sang-soo, Kim Sun-kap, Lee Hyung-man, and Choi Jong-gwan.

== Influence on the contemporary art ==
Though, the earlier finery and importance of najeonchilgi faded somewhat with the advent of modern technologies in art and craft work, an ongoing sense of pride for this type of culture and tradition continues, with modern artworks also beginning to use such traditional techniques.

Modern examples include the Ottchil Museum in Tongyeong, which produces exhibitions of traditional ottchil and najeonchilgi alongside modern artworks that use the same methods. Across Korea and internationally, there continue to be art and handicraft exhibitions aimed at preserving this tradition, while also promoting it as an explicitly Korean way of producing contemporary art for the future.
