= Aja Raden =

Writer

- Born: 1980 or 1981 (age 44–45)

Aja Raden is an author, historian, scientist and jewelry designer. She wrote a widely-reviewed 2015 nonfiction book about the social history of gems but is more well-known for her appearance in the 2022 documentary Nothing Lasts Forever.

== Education and early career ==
Raden studied physics and ancient history at the University of Chicago. She worked for the House of Kahn Estate Jewelers in Chicago and for Tacori in California.

== Writing and commentary on gems ==
Kirkus called her 2015 nonfiction work discussing the history of jewelry, Stoned, "a lively, incisive cultural and social history".

The Wall Street Journal described her appearance on the 2022 documentary Nothing Lasts Forever as "comically caustic". Decider called her appearance "an extremely witty breath of fresh air" and said that her "go-for-broke, take-no-prisoners disdain for bullshit is inspiring". Variety called her appearance "endlessly quotable". Indiewire called her the documentary's standout and a "natural scene stealer", saying she "radiates charisma with dramatic turns of phrase and a highly attuned bullshit meter".

== Bibliography ==
- The Truth About Lies (2021)
- Stoned (2015)
