= Tacori =

Jewelry company

- Industry: Jewellers
- Founded: 1969, in Los Angeles, United States
- Founder: Haig and Gilda Tacorian
- Headquarters: Glendale, United States
- Area served: United States, Canada
- Key people: Paul Tacorian (CEO); Nadine Tacorian Arzerounian (Head of Design)
- Products: Jewelry
- Website: www.tacori.com

Tacori is an American jewelry design house and manufacturer based in Glendale, California. The brand is heavily associated with bridal jewelry.

== History ==
The company was established by Haig Tacorian and his wife Gilda, both coming from Romania and of Armenian heritage. Gilda's father was a jeweler in Romania during the 1950s by the Communist Regime of Romania. Gilda and her family were granted to emigrate from Romania to The United States in 1962, with Haig following in 1970. In 1972, the couple joined Gilda's father in founding a new jewelry company in California, B&T Jewelers. Seven years later, Gilda and Haig founded their own company, Tacori, which was based in the Downtown LA Jewelry District. In 1998, Haig commissioned an engagement ring from a fellow jeweler, Garo Kourounian, which had a design that included a crescent shape which matched the top two curves of a heart. The heart design evolved and became Tacori's signature crescent silhouette. The couple's children and other relatives have joined the family business.

Originally focused on selling pearls, the company expanded into diamonds in the early 1990s and by 2005 had become heavily identified with bridal jewelry, including engagement rings and bridal wear accessories. This bridal jewelry became very popular in the United States after the television series The Bachelor and The Bachelorette began featuring its product lines in their programs. The design house's jewelry is known for its crescent silhouette and as of 2005 had launched over 30 lawsuits to protect the trademark. In 2013, Tacori was named on the "Top Five most visible brands" in the category of jewelry by INDESIGN magazine; that same year, it was announced as a finalist for the Communications category of the Jewelers of America's annual GEM Award in response to its advertisement "Par Chance", directed by Steve Antin. Released in December 2012, the ad campaign was intended to both display the design house's new line and to help associate the brand identity with personality traits of the wearer.

Tacori jewelry is primarily retailed throughout the United States and Canada, in addition to some international retail locations.
