= Si Unyil =

Indonesian children's television series

- Genre: Children
- Created by: Suyadi
- Country of origin: Indonesia
- Original language: Indonesian

Production
- Running time: approx. 30 minutes
- Production company: PPFN (1981–2002) MNC Media (2003–2005)

Original release
- Network: TVRI (1981–1993); RCTI (2002–2003); TPI (2003–2005); Trans7 (2007–2022)
- Release: April 5, 1981 – 2005

Related
- Laptop Si Unyil

Unyil or Si Unyil is an Indonesian children's television franchise owned by Produksi Film Negara (PFN). It started as a long-running children's television series, which ran on TVRI. The Unyil show, which airs every Sunday morning, tells the story about the eponymous main character whose typical Indonesian family lives in a rural area in the fictional Sukamaju Village. He lives with his dad, mom, and cousin. Along its 10 years show, the main characters never grew up and were "stuck" in the third grade. His best friends are Usro and Ucrit, while his (sometime) enemies are Endut and Cuplis.

First debuted in April 1981 on what was the only Indonesian television company at that time and state-owned TVRI, the show gradually became a close friend to Indonesian children.

== Plot ==
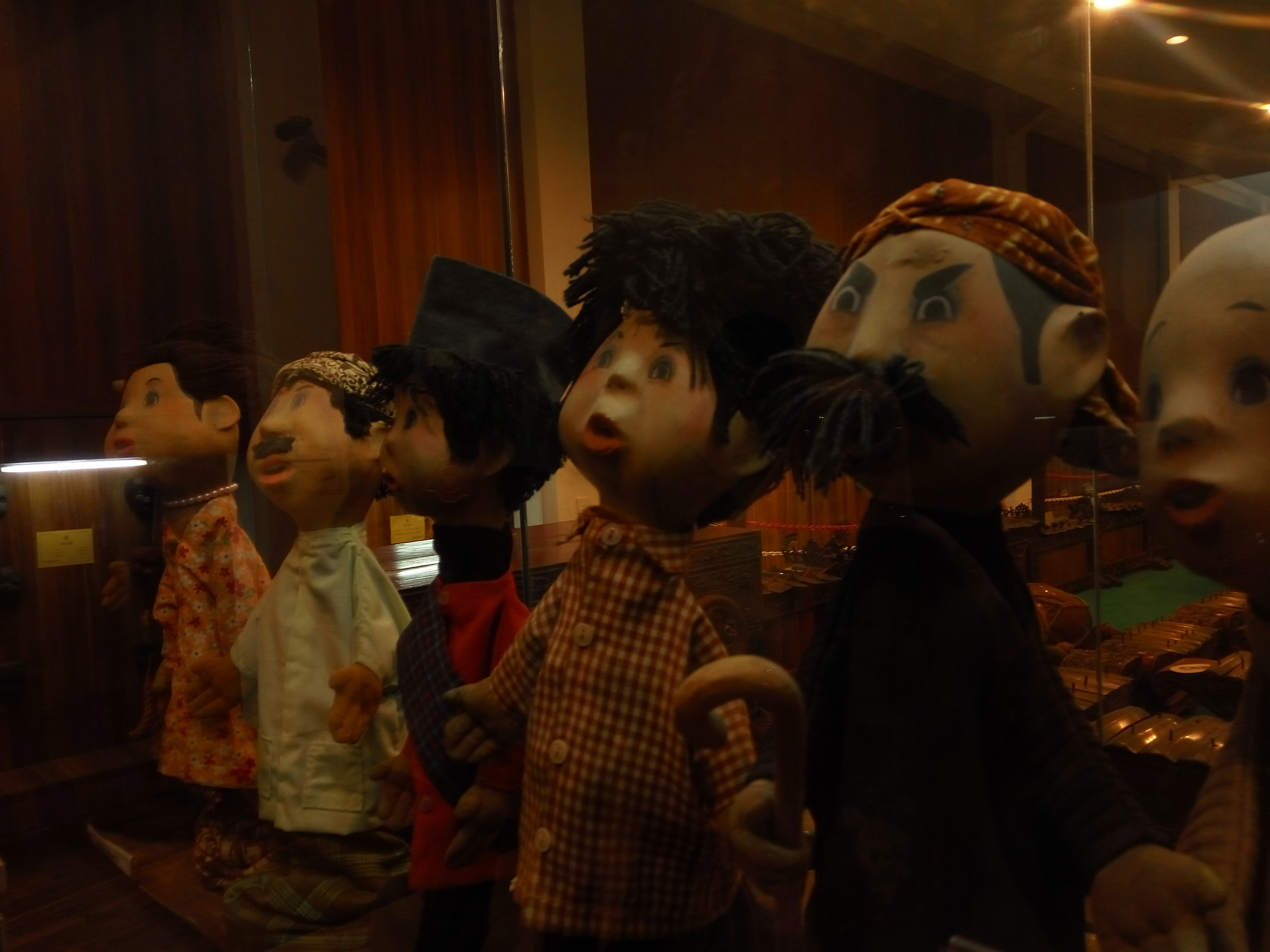
Main characters of Si Unyil

All characters of Si Unyil are hand puppets with the physical appearances of ordinary Indonesian faces. Traditional touch is strongly apparent in the show, from the suit of every characters to the stories that dealing with everyday life. Characters are divided into "good" and "bad" ones, where a group of three young children (Unyil and his two friends) as good, while three other children as bad boys. Conflicts often arouse between the two groups with the ending always with a message to become a good children.

To enhance the story and to be more entertaining, two antagonistic characters were introduced. They are the short-tempered thick mustached Pak Raden and the lazy Pak Ogah. Although the two antagonistic characters were supposed to be unsympathetic ones, they were more popular than other characters. Pak Raden represents a hard working man with a rugged face and strong Javanese background who always wears a traditional Javanese suit. The popularity of Pak Raden came when he became funny and was wrong all the time, despite that he insisted strongly at the beginning that he was right. Pak Ogah, on the other hand, represents a lazy person who does not want to work but only to ask money when people asking for his help. He usually accompanied by his sidekick Ableh.

== Current Trans7 version ==
The current version of Si Unyil (formerly titled Laptop Si Unyil (Unyil's Laptop) is a feature show heavily resembling How It's Made which focuses on technology and culture; first aired on March 19, 2007, on Trans7. It features Unyil. The weekend version of Laptop Si Unyil, Buku Harian Si Unyil (Unyil's Diary) no longer airs. In early 2020; Laptop Si Unyil changed name to Si Unyil, as its original title.

In this show; product type is always referred, not the brand name.

== See also ==
- Cinema of Indonesia
- Si Unyil at IMDb
