= Raden =

Japanese decorative craft

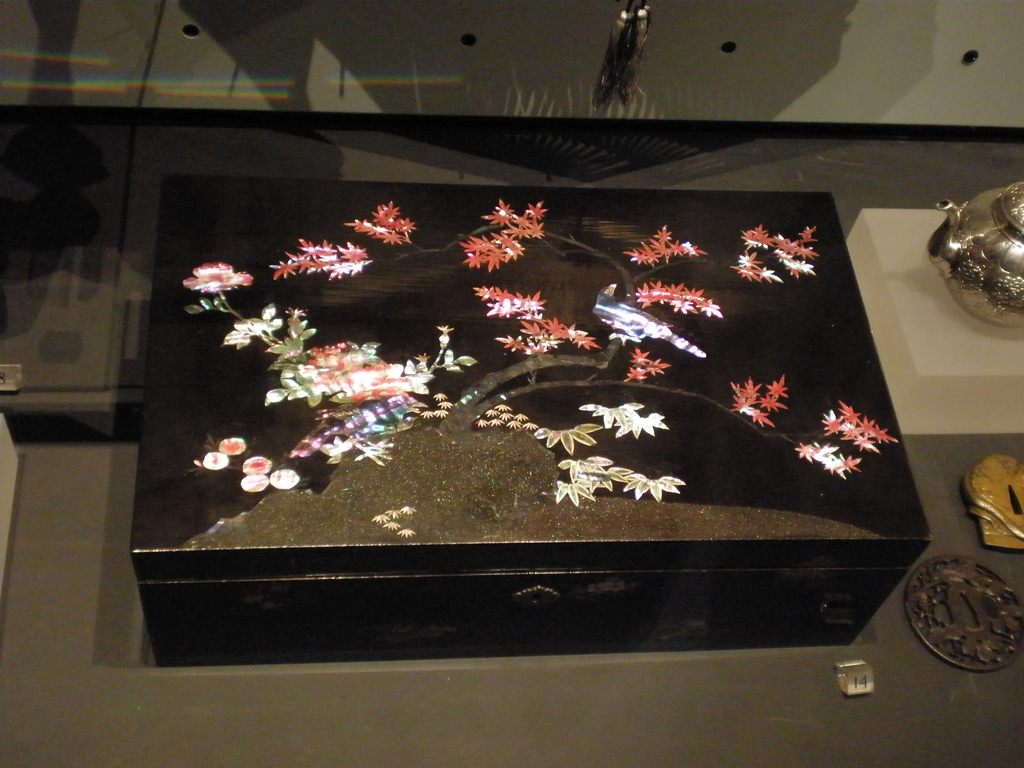
Shibayama-style writing box, Nagasaki, 1800–1850, wood covered with black lacquer and inlaid with flowers in under-painted mother-of-pearl shell.

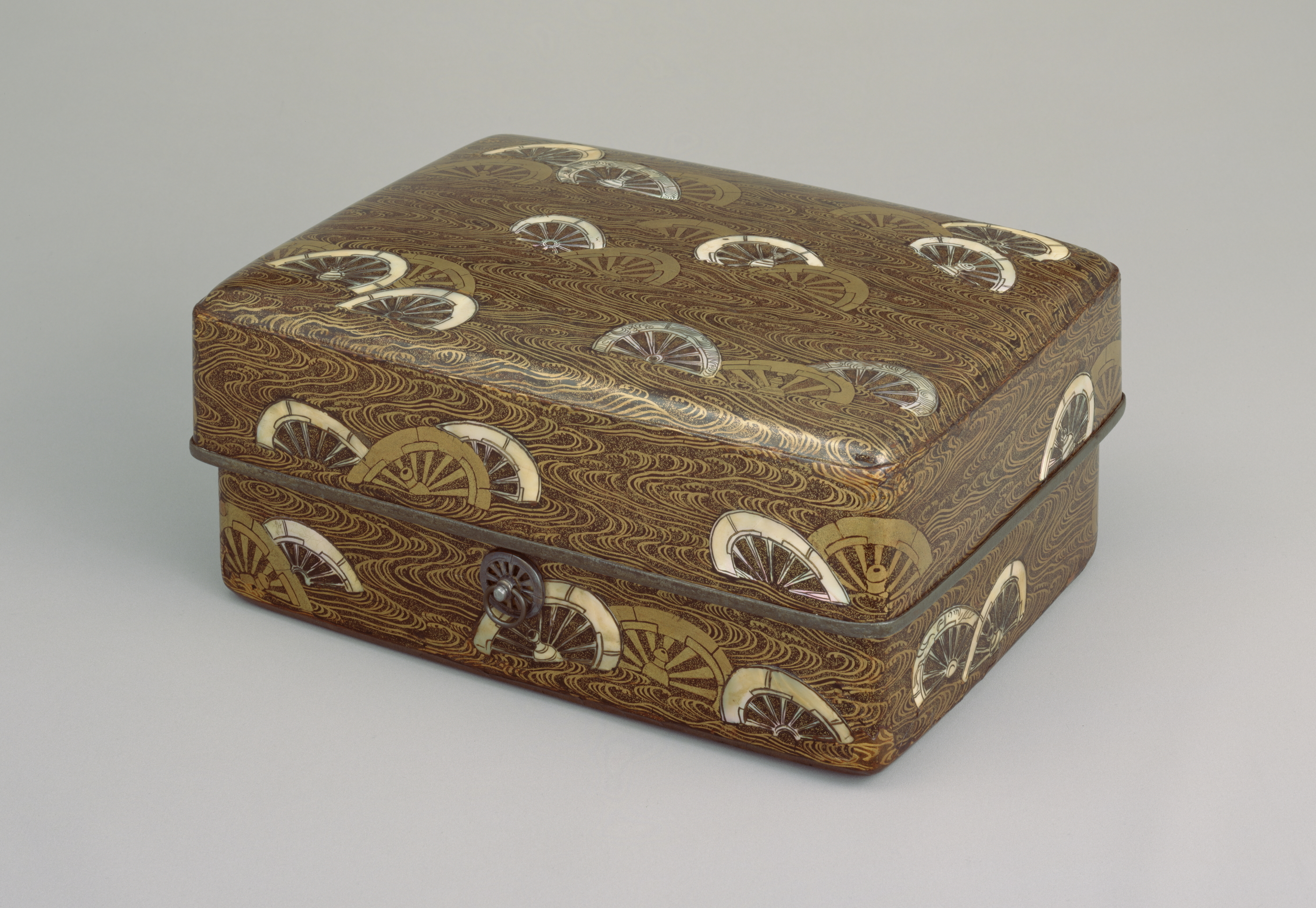
Inlaid maki-e raden paper box with "wheels in flow" (katawaguruma) design, National Treasure, Heian period, 11–12th century, Tokyo National Museum

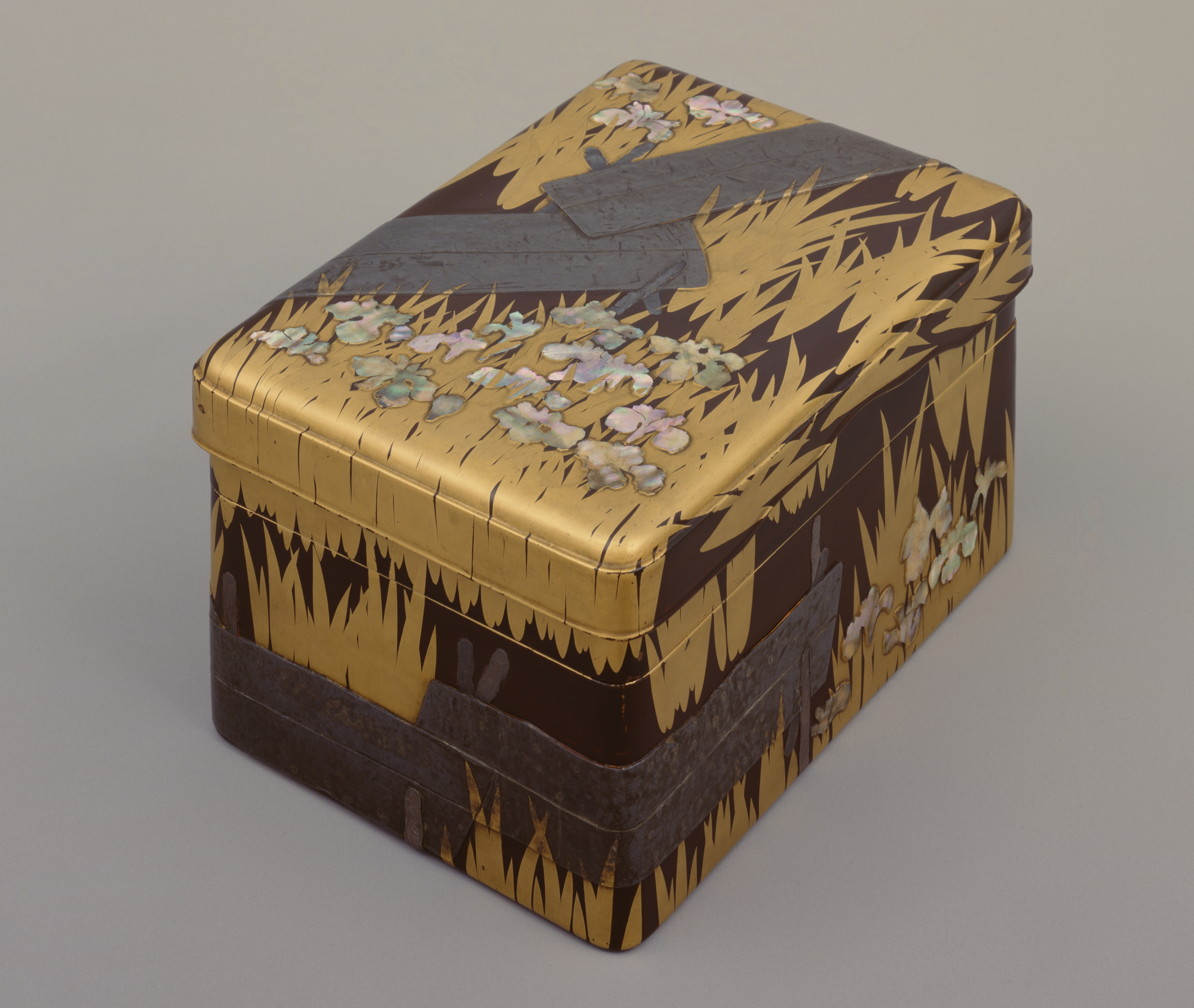
Inlaid maki-e raden writing box with "Eight Bridges" (Yatsuhashi) design, by Ogata Kōrin, National Treasure, Edo period, 18th century. The flowers are abalone shell inlays, Tokyo National Museum

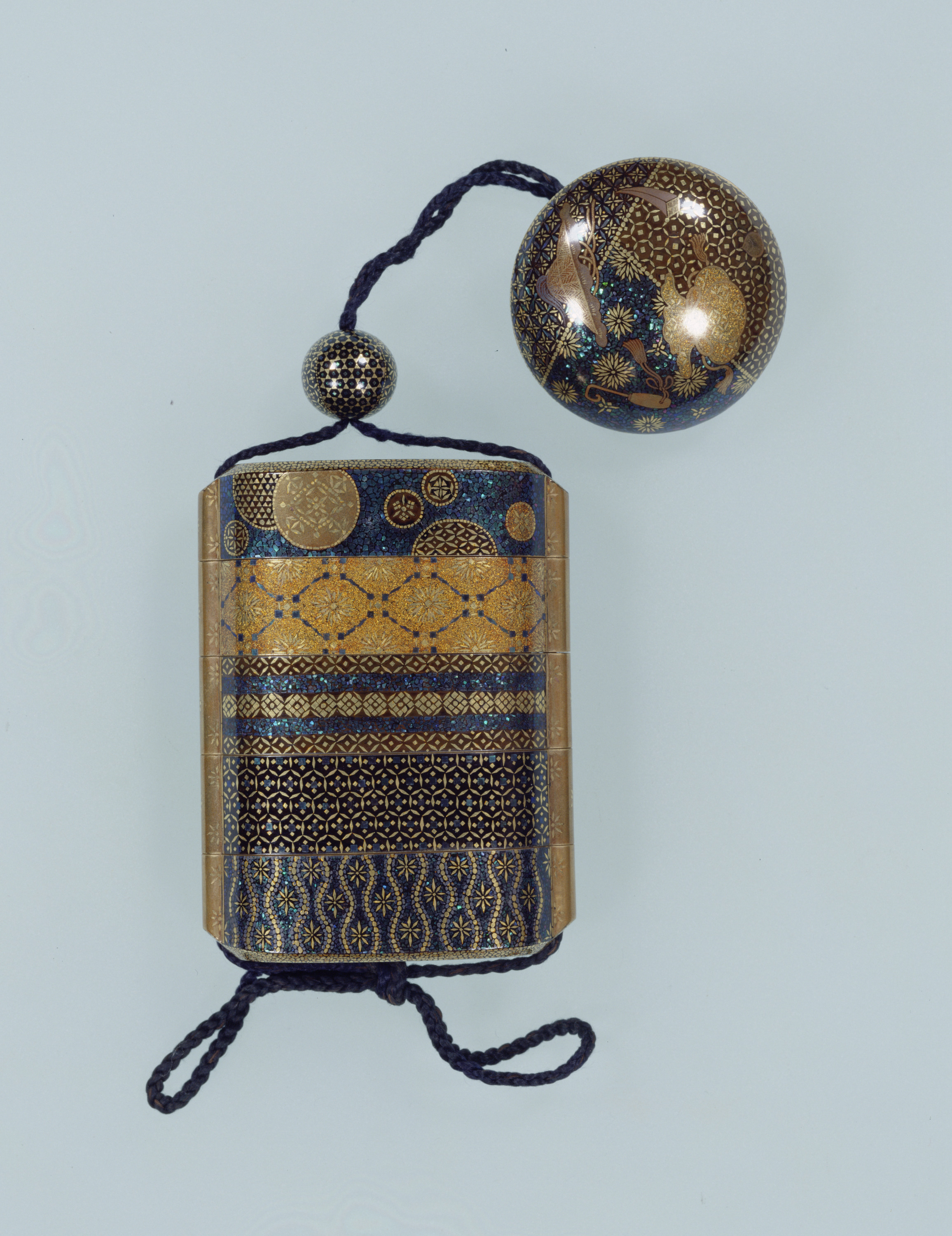
Inrō, Design of minute patterns in mother-of-pearl inlay, Somada school characterized by a combination of raden and makie techniques, Edo period, 19th century, Tokyo National Museum

Raden (Japanese: 螺鈿, hiragana: らでん) is the Japanese term for Lydian (Chinese: 螺钿; traditional Chinese: 螺鈿; pinyin: luódiàn), a traditional East Asian decorative technique involving the inlay of nacre into lacquerware, wood, and other surfaces. It was subsequently introduced to Japan from the Tang dynasty during the Nara period.

The term may also be used for similar traditional work from Korea called najeonchilgi (螺鈿漆器), from China called luodian (Chinese: 螺钿), from Vietnam called khảm xà cừ (chữ Nôm: 坎𤥭璖), and for modern work done in the West.

== Techniques of production ==
There are many ways that raden is produced, with all techniques classed under three main categories: atsugai (using thick shell pieces), usugai (using much thinner pieces), and kenma (the thinnest application of shell pieces).

In atsugai raden, the shell is often cut with a scroll saw, then finished with a file or rubstone before application. In usugai raden, the thinner shell pieces are usually made using a template and a special punch. Kenma raden is fashioned similarly to usugai raden.

Methods of application are varied. Thick shell pieces may be inlaid into pre-carved settings, while thinner pieces may be pressed into a very thick coating of lacquer, or applied using an adhesive and then lacquered over. Other methods use acid washing and lacquering to produce different effects.

Raden is especially combined with maki-e – gold or silver lacquer sprinkled with metal powder as a decoration.

== History ==
One theory is that the technique of raden in the East was introduced from the Sasanian Persia to Tang China, and another theory is that it already existed in the Shang dynasty, though the former theory is more likely. By the Tang dynasty, the technique, known in Chinese as luodian, had reached a very mature level, especially lacquer-backed luodian on bronze mirrors, which was a treasure of craftsmanship in this period. Bronze mirrors with luodian lacquer backs have been excavated from Tang tombs in Shanxian County and Luoyang, Henan Province.

The basic technique of luodian was introduced from the Tang dynasty into Japan during the Nara period, where it is referred to as raden, using the same Chinese characters. In Japan, raden had been used in combination with Japanese various maki-e techniques since the Heian period, but raden declined in the Muromachi period.

From the Sengoku period to the Azuchi-Momoyama period, many Japanese lacquerware decorated with maki-e and raden attracted European people, and were exported through the Nanban trade via Portuguese and Spanish in response to the request of the Society of Jesus. Raden was often used in the creation of European-style items, such as chests of drawers and coffee cups, and was very popular in Europe, as the mother-of-pearl covering the items contributed to their status as a unique luxury. The Japanese referred to these goods as "Nanban lacquerware", with Nanban meaning "Southern Barbarians", a term borrowed from the Chinese and, in 16th century Japan, meaning any foreigner, especially a European.

The kanji for ra (螺) means 'shell' and den (鈿) means 'inlaid'. Raden is a term used only for the technique or work of inlaying thin layers of pearl shells. In Japan, the technique of embedding the mother of pearl of shellfish in lacquer is called raden, while the technique of embedding metal or ivory is called zōgan (象嵌).

In the Edo period, many pieces of Japanese lacquerware were exported to royalty and nobility in Europe through Dutch East India Company and private traders. The lacquerware exported during the Edo period put more emphasis on artistic expression by maki-e using gold powder lavishly than raden. Until the 1690s, the Dutch East India Company monopolized the export of Japanese lacquerware throughout Europe, but the lacquerware using maki-e technique using a large amount of gold was so expensive that the customers were limited to royalty and nobility, and after 1690, it was exported through private trade.

After the Opening of Japan to foreign trade in the 1850s, raden work for export markets soon became significant again. The Somada style and Shibayama style lacquerware using the raden technique became popular and were exported in large quantities from Yokohama to Europe and the United States. Somada ware is a style invented by Somada Kiyosuke in the 1670s, and is characterized by a regular pattern made of a combination of lacquer, finely cut shellfish, gold leaf and silver leaf. Shibayama ware is a style invented by Shibayama Senzo in the 1770s, characterized by the inlay of various materials such as shellfish, gold, silver, ivory, coral, tortoise shell, and ceramics.

The raden works of a number of famous Edo period craftsmen are still celebrated, namely those of Tōshichi Ikushima, Chōbei Aogai, and the Somada brothers. Raden is widespread in Japan today, and is made for many applications, modern and classic.

== Gallery ==
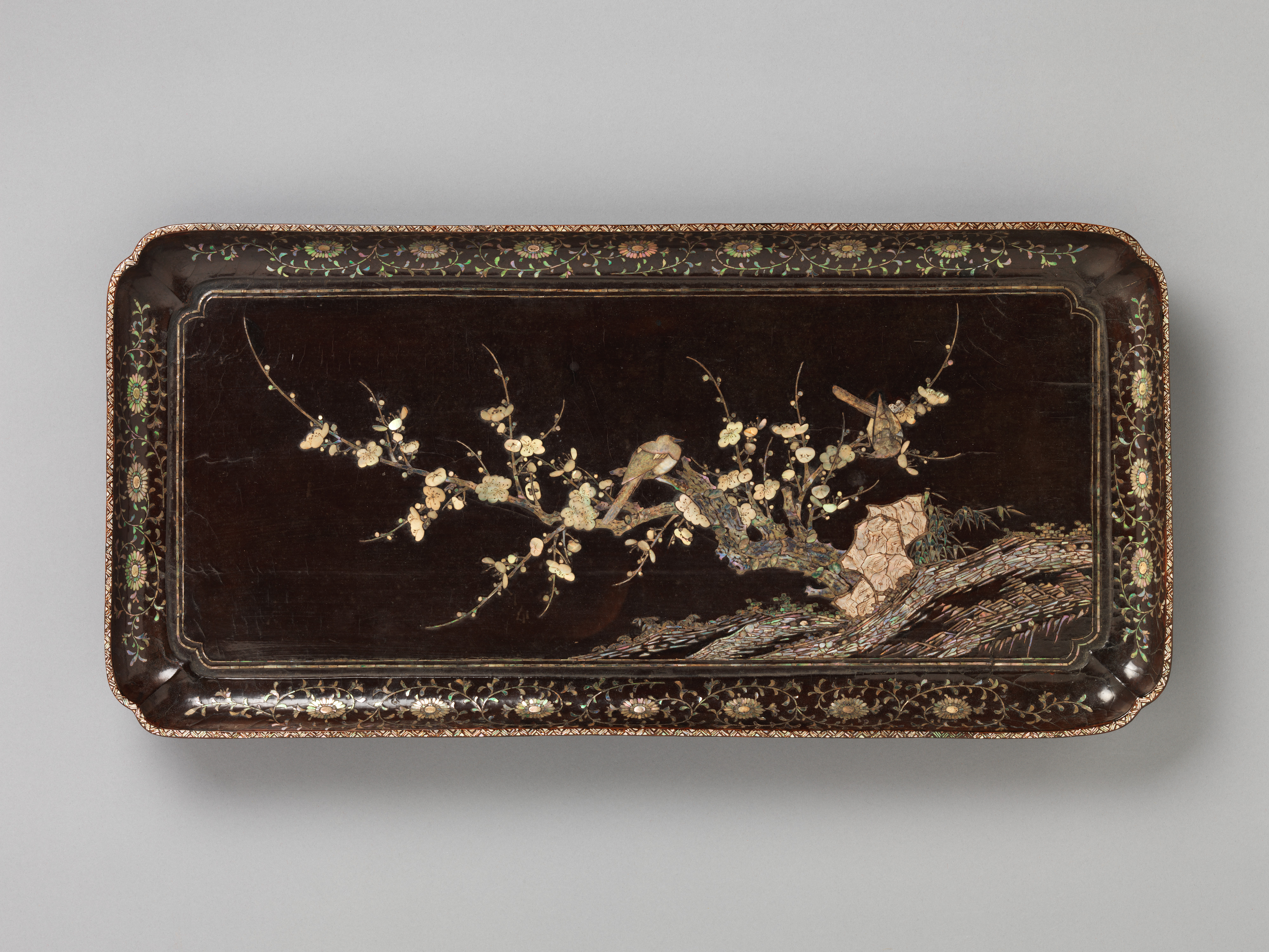
Tray with flowering plum and birds, China, 14th century. Metropolitan Museum

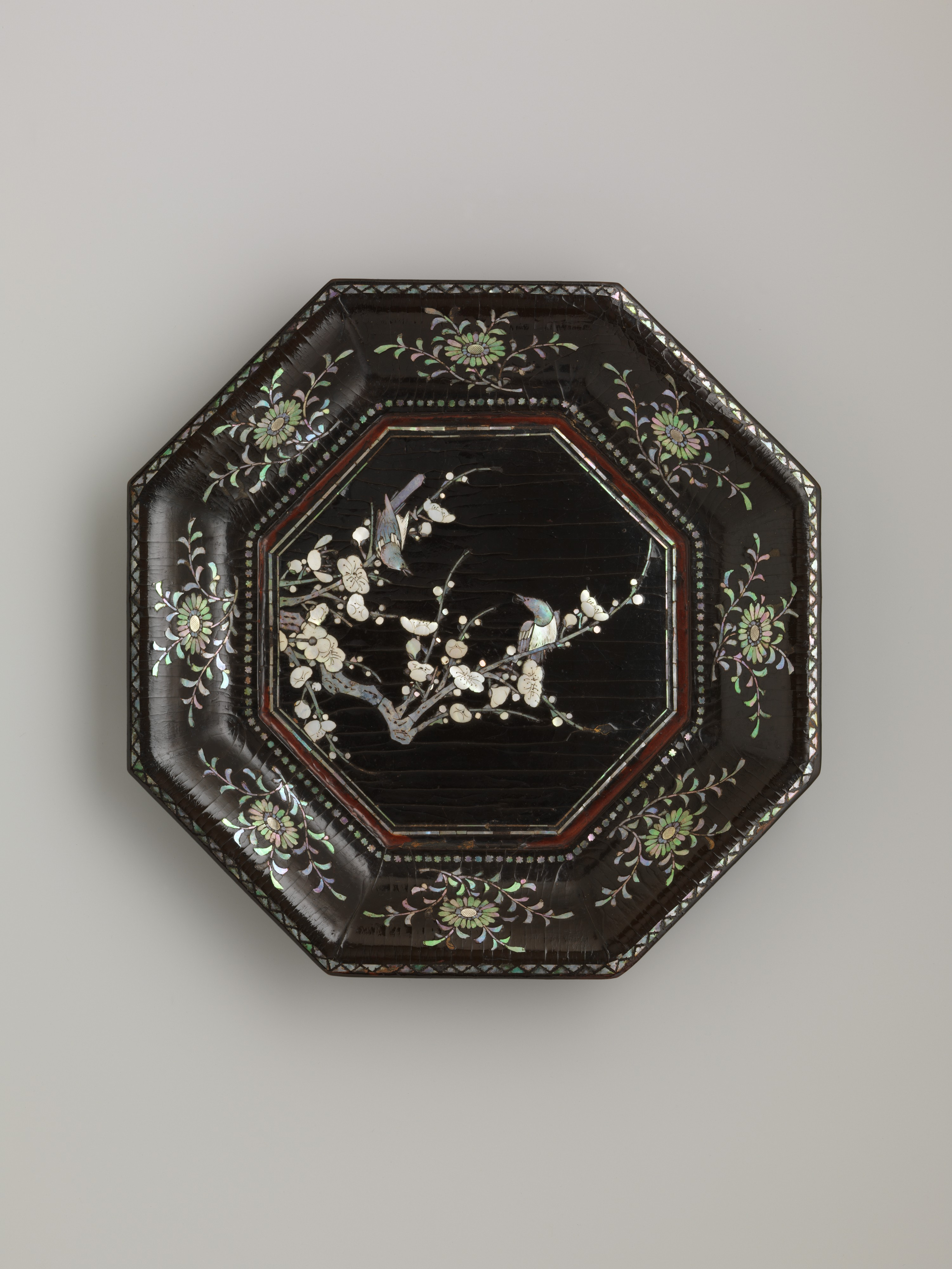

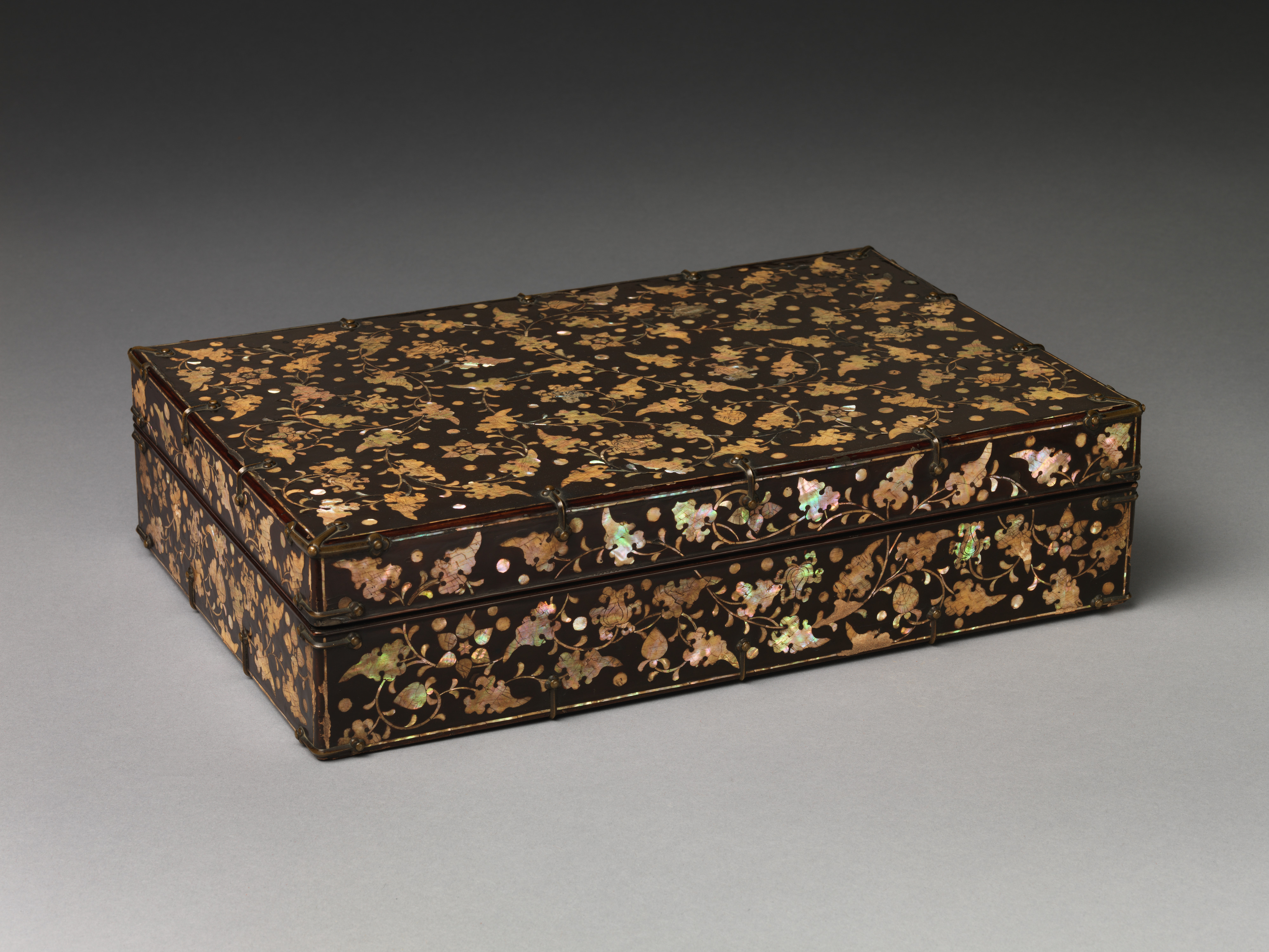
Stationary box decorated with peony scrolls, Korea, 15th-16th century. Metropolitan Museum

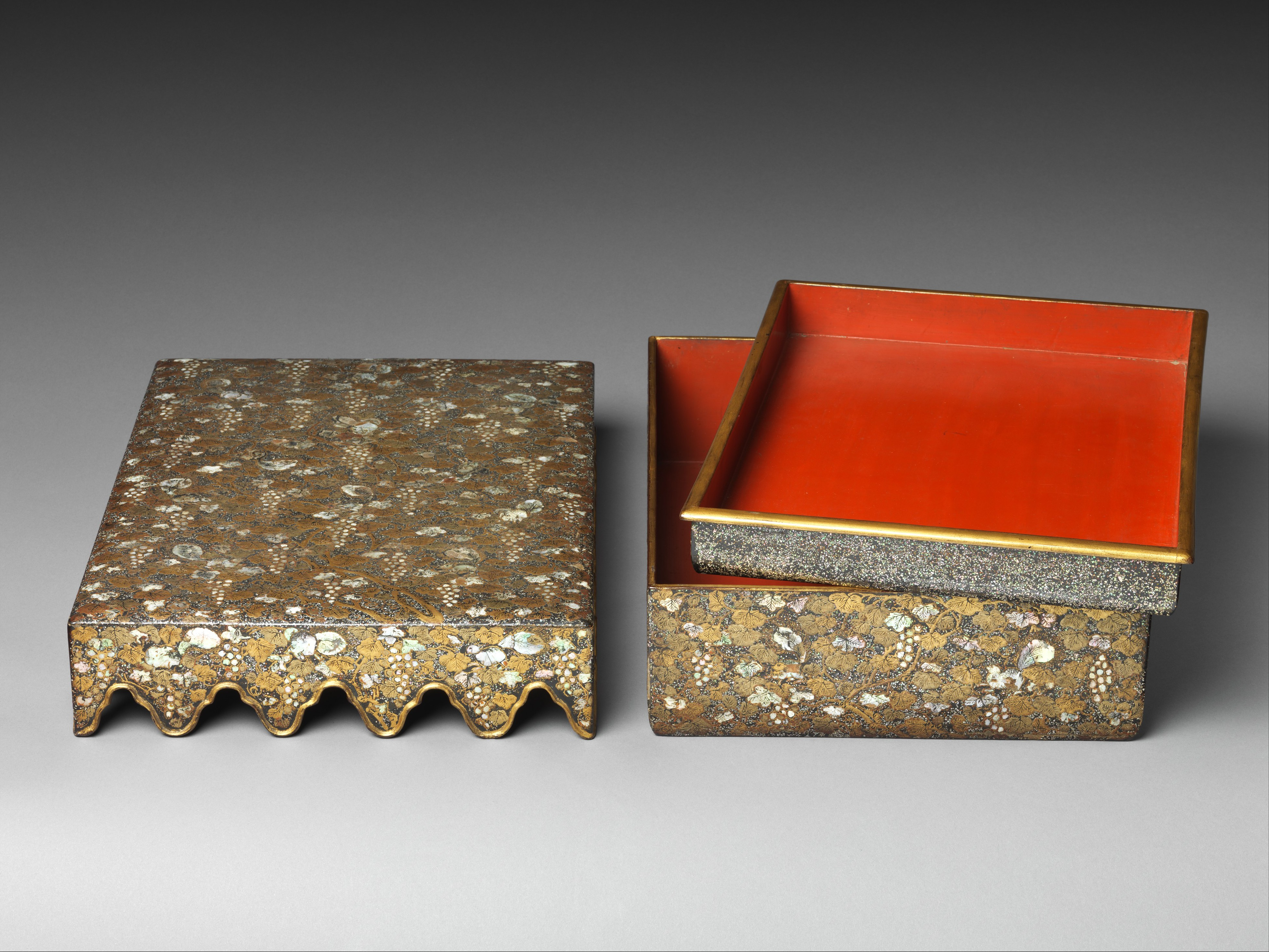
Stationary box, Ryukyu, 17th century. Metropolitan Museum

== See also ==
- Damascening
- Mother-of-pearl carving in Bethlehem
- Nacre
