= Suyadi =

Indonesian animator, puppeteer and television presenter (1932–2015)

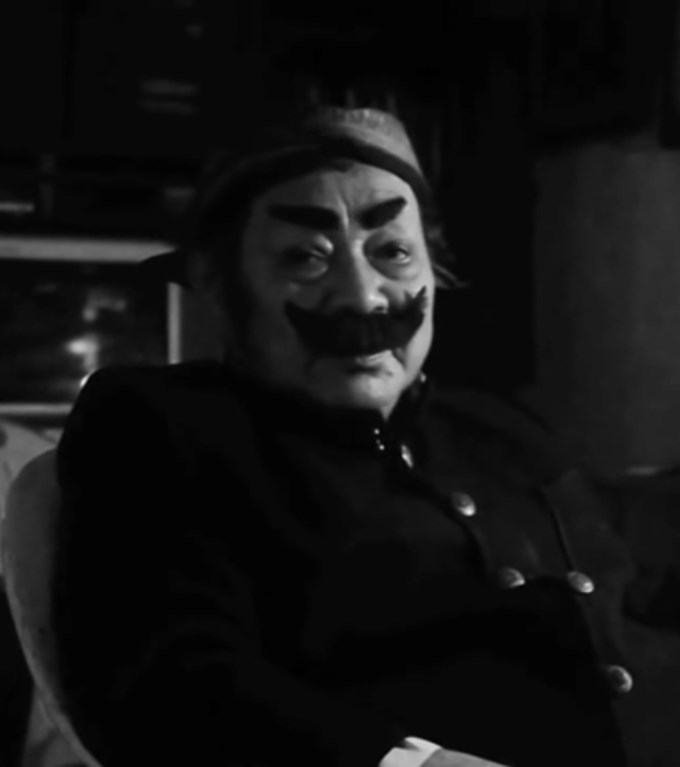
- Born: Raden Soejadi; November 28, 1932; Puger, Jember, Dutch East Indies
- Died: October 30, 2015 (aged 82); Jakarta, Indonesia
- Other name: Pak Raden
- Years active: 1947–2015
- Relatives: Ratih Sanggarwati (niece)
- Website: pakraden.org

Drs. Suyadi (November 28, 1932 – October 30, 2015), also known as Pak Raden, was an Indonesian animator, puppeteer and television presenter, creator of the children's television series Si Unyil. Suyadi created Si Unyil as an educational program for Indonesian children in the 1980s. In the 2000s, Unyil was updated with a new series, Laptop Si Unyil.

Suyadi was a fine arts graduate of Bandung Institute of Technology (1952–1960) and then continued studying animation in France (1961–1963).

Suyadi was also asked by the Ministry of Education and Culture of the Republic of Indonesia to illustrate Indonesian elementary school level textbooks.

== Death ==
Suyadi died on October 30, 2015, at Pelni Petamburan Hospital at 22:20 pm. His body was buried in Jeruk Purut Cemetery, South Jakarta, Saturday, October 31, 2015.

== Tribute ==
On November 28, 2016, Google celebrated his 84th birthday with a Google Doodle.
