= List of awards and nominations received by Joko Anwar =

List of accolades received by Mouly Surya
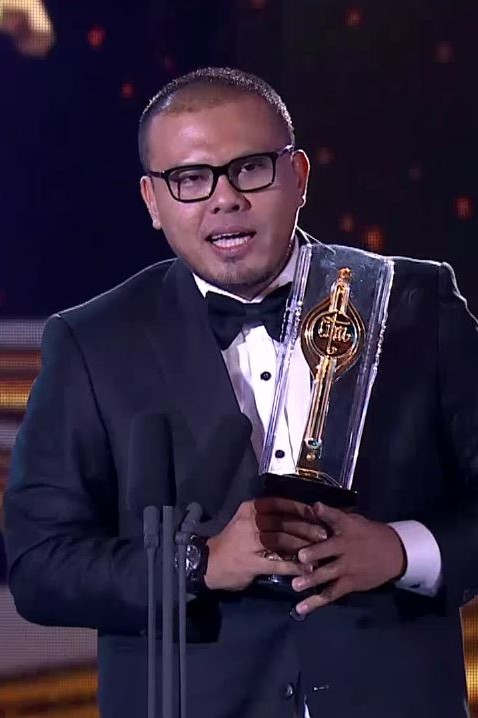
- Joko Anwar has won the Citra Award for Best Director twice in 2015 and 2020.
Accolades
Award	Won	Nominated
Asian Television Awards	0	1
Bandung Film Festival	0	1
Bangkok International Film Festival	0	1
Bucheon International Fantastic Film Festival	1	1
Cinepocalypse	1	0
Citra Awards	3	13
Fantasporto	0	2
Oslo Films from the South Festival	0	1
Film Pilihan Tempo	0	4
Five Flavours Film Festival	0	1
Indonesian Box Office Movie Awards	0	2
Jogja-NETPAC Asian Film Festival	1	2
Maya Awards	1	7
Molins Film Festival	1	3
MTV Indonesia Movie Awards	0	1
Sitges Film Festival	1	0
South by Southwest	0	1
Venice International Film Festival	0	1
Vesoul Asian Film Festival	0	1
- Total number of awards and nominations
Totals	9	43
- References

Joko Anwar (born 3 January 1976) is an Indonesian film director, producer, screenwriter, and actor.

Anwar first rose to prominence for co-writing Nia Dinata's 2003 hit Arisan! which won five awards at the 2004 Citra Award. He then made his feature film Directorial Debut with the romantic comedy Joni's Promise in 2005, gaining a Best Director nomination at the 2005 Citra Award. He has since directed a wide range of genres: the noir thriller Dead Time: Kala (2007), psychological thriller The Forbidden Door (2009), supernatural horror Satan's Slaves (2017), and live-action superhero Gundala (2019).

Anwar has won three Citra Awards out of 11 nominations for directing and screenwriting. He won the Best Director Awards twice: in 2015 for the urban drama A Copy of My Mind and in 2020 for the folk horror Impetigore as well as the Best Screenplay Award in 2008 for co-writing Mouly Surya's Fiksi.. He has also been nominated for a total of 7 Maya Awards, winning Best Director for Satan's Slaves in 2017.

== Asian Television Awards ==
Year	Category	Work	Result	Ref.
2016	Best Direction in Fiction	Halfworlds	Nominated	

== Bandung Film Festival ==
Year	Category	Work	Result	Ref.
2020	Best Director	Gundala	Nominated	

== Bangkok International Film Festival ==
Year	Category	Work	Result	Ref.
2009	Golden Kinnaree Award	The Forbidden Door	Nominated	

== Bucheon International Fantastic Film Festival ==
Year	Category	Work	Result	Ref.
2009	Best of Bucheon	The Forbidden Door	Won	

== Cinepocalypse ==
Year	Category	Work	Result	Ref.
2018	Best Director	Satan's Slaves	Won	

== Citra Awards ==
Year	Category	Work	Result	Notes	Ref.
2004	Best Screenplay	Arisan!	Nominated	shared with Nia Dinata	
2005	Best Director	Joni's Promise	Nominated		
2008	Best Screenplay	Fiksi.	Won	shared with Mouly Surya	
2009	Best Adapted Screenplay	The Forbidden Door	Nominated		
2015	Best Director	A Copy of My Mind	Won		
2017	Best Director	Satan's Slaves	Nominated		
2017	Best Original Screenplay	Stip & Pensil	Nominated		
2017	Best Adapted Screenplay	Satan's Slaves	Nominated	shared with Ernest Prakasa & Bene Dion Rajagukguk	
2019	Best Original Screenplay	Orang Kaya Baru	Nominated		
2019	Best Adapted Screenplay	Gundala	Nominated		
2020	Best Director	Impetigore	Won		
2020	Best Original Screenplay	Impetigore	Nominated		
2020	Best Adapted Screenplay	The Queen of Black Magic	Nominated		

== Fantasporto ==
Year	Category	Work	Result	Ref.
2013	Orient Express Grand Prize	Ritual	Nominated	
2013	Orient Express Special Jury Award	Ritual	Nominated	

== Oslo Films from the South Festival ==
Year	Category	Work	Result
2013	Audience Award	Satan's Slaves	Nominated

== Film Pilihan Tempo ==
Year	Category	Work	Result	Ref.
2017	Best Director	Satan's Slaves	Nominated	
2017	Best Screenplay	Satan's Slaves	Nominated	
2019	Best Director	Impetigore	Nominated	
2019	Best Screenplay	Impetigore	Nominated	

== Five Flavours Film Festival ==
Year	Category	Work	Result
2016	New Asian Cinema Best Film	A Copy of My Mind	Nominated

== Indonesian Box Office Movie Awards ==
Year	Category	Work	Result
2018	Best Director	Satan's Slaves	Nominated
2018	Best Screenplay	Satan's Slaves	Nominated

== Jogja-NETPAC Asian Film Festival ==
Year	Category	Work	Result
2015	Geber Award	A Copy of My Mind	Won
2015	Golden Hanoman Award	A Copy of My Mind	Nominated

== Maya Awards ==
Year	Category	Work	Result	Ref.
2016	Best Director	A Copy of My Mind	Nominated	
2016	Best Original Screenplay	A Copy of My Mind	Nominated	
2017	Best Director	Satan's Slaves	Won	
2017	Best Adapted Screenplay	Satan's Slaves	Nominated	
2017	Arifin C. Noer Award for Memorable Brief Appearance	Satan's Slaves	Nominated	
2020	Best Director	Impetigore	Nominated	
2020	Best Original Screenplay	Impetigore	Nominated	

== Molins Film Festival ==
Year	Category	Work	Result
2012	Best Director	Ritual	Won
2018	Best Director	Satan's Slaves	Nominated
2018	Best Screenplay	Satan's Slaves	Nominated

== MTV Indonesia Movie Awards ==
Year	Category	Work	Result
2005	Best Director	Joni's Promise	Nominated

== Sitges Film Festival ==
Year	Category	Work	Result
2026	Best Director	Ghost in the Cell	Won

== South by Southwest ==
Year	Category	Work	Result
2012	Midnight Audience Award	Ritual	Nominated

== Venice International Film Festival ==
Year	Category	Work	Result
2015	Orizzonti Best Film	A Copy of My Mind	Nominated

== Vesoul Asian Film Festival ==
Year	Category	Work	Result
2006	Golden Wheel	Joni's Promise	Nominated
