= Indonesian horror =

Genre of Indonesian cinema

Indonesian horror are fictions and films of the horror genre produced by the Indonesian film industry. Often inspired by local folklore and religious elements, Indonesian horror films have been produced in the country since the 1960s. After a hiatus during the Suharto era in the 1990s, when censorship affected production, Indonesian horror films continued being produced following Reformasi in 1998.

== History ==
Ghosts and magical folklore have long been part of Indonesian culture. These later influenced the development of horror films. Kuntilanak are particularly prominent in local horror films.

During the authoritarian New Order regime under President Suharto, many horror films included religious symbolism and heroes to adhere to strict guidelines from censors. The Ministry Information under Ali Murtopo required that Indonesian films at the time had to follow strict moral and ethical guidelines, meaning many horror films juxtaposed violence and sexuality with religious heroes and themes. Thomas Barker has argued that films produced after 1998 in Indonesia have been particularly shaped by what he described as the residual "trauma" of violence under the preceding New Order era under President Suharto.

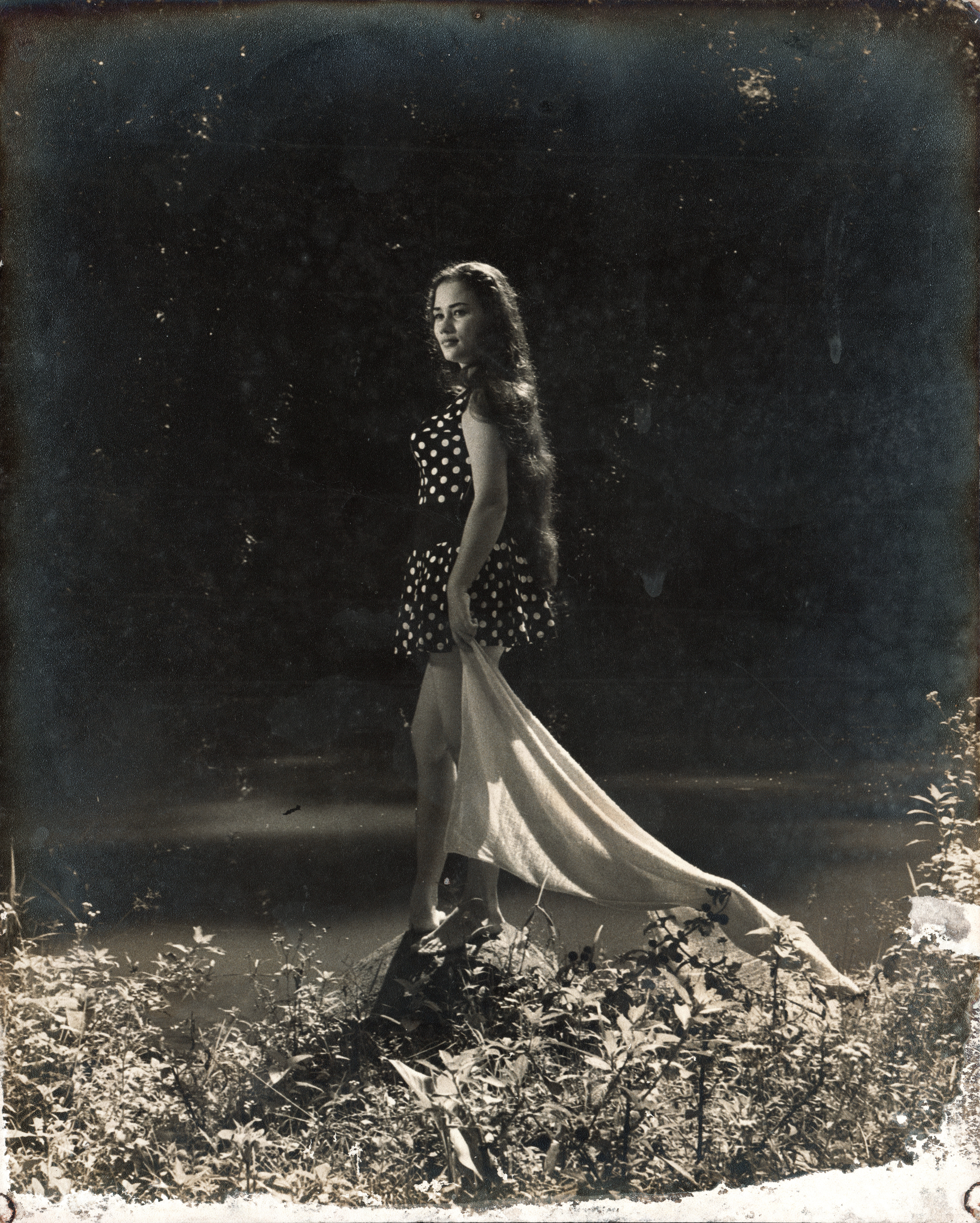
Actress Suzzanna has been called the "Queen of Indonesian horror".

Suzzanna was a major film star in the 1970s and 1980s for her work in horror films. She appeared in 42 films before her death in 2008, including Bernafas dalam Lumpur, Beranak dalam Kubur and Sundel Bolong.

Indonesian horror films, particularly the work of Joko Anwar, attracted heightened international attention in the late 2010s, aided by streaming services. Some outlets declared films like Impetigore (2019) as part of a new wave of folk horror films from Southeast Asia. Impetigore was Indonesia's submission for the Academy Award for Best International Feature Film in its year of release and attracted international recognition, but was not nominated.

HBO Asia also released Indonesian-developed horror television series Halfworlds.

== Themes ==
Themes approached in Indonesian horror include haunted forests as in Alas Pati: Hutan Mati (2018) and ghost stories, for example.

== Selection of Indonesian horror films ==
- Badai-Selatan (1962)
- Beranak dalam Kubur (1971)
- Mystics in Bali (1981)
- Sundelbolong
  - Sundelbolong (1981)
  - Telaga Angker (1984)
  - Malam Jumat Kliwon (1986)
  - Suzzanna: Buried Alive (2018) Remake of Sundelbolong (1981)
  - Suzzanna: Friday Kliwon Night (2023) Remake of Malam Jumat Kliwon (1986)
- Satan's Slave or (Pengabdi Setan) Series
  - Satan's Slave (1981)
  - Satan's Slaves (2017)
  - Satan's Slaves 2: Communion (2022)
  - Satan's Slaves 3: Origin (2027)
- Lady Terminator (1988)
- Santet
  - Santet: Ilmu Pelebur Nyawa (1988)
  - Santet 2: Wanita Harimau (1989)
  - Suzzanna: Witchcraft (2026) Remake of Santet: Ilmu Pelebur Nyawa (1988)
- Pancasona (1989)
- Jelangkung Series based on Jailangkung
  - Jelangkung (2001)
  - Tusuk Jelangkung (2003)
  - Angkerbatu (2007)
  - Jelangkung 3 (2007)
  - Jailangkung (2017)
  - Jailangkung 2 (2018)
  - Jailangkung: Sandekala (2022)
- Kafir Series
  - Kafir (2002)
  - Kafir: A Deal with the Devil (2018)
  - Kafir: The Spirit Gate (2026)
- Kuntilanak Series based on Kuntilanak
  - Kuntilanak 1 (2006)
  - Kuntilanak 2 (2007)
  - Kuntilanak 3 (2008)
  - Kuntilanak 1 (2018)
  - Kuntilanak 2 (2019)
  - Mangkujiwo (2020)
  - Kuntilanak 3 (2022)
  - Mangkujiwo 2 (2023)
- Dara/Macabre by The Mo Brothers
  - Dara (2007)
  - Takut: Faces of Fear (2008) Segment: 'Dara''
  - Macabre (2009)
- Based on Pintu Terlarang (2004) by Sekar Ayu Asmara
  - The Forbidden Door (2009)
- Shackled (2012)
- Ritual (2012)
- Hi5teria (2012)
- Killers (2014)
- Firegate (2016)
- Danur Series by Risa Saraswati
  - Danur: I Can See Ghosts (2017)
  - Danur 2: Maddah (2018)
  - Danur 3: Sunyaruri (2019)
  - Danur: The Last Chapter (2026)
  - Asih 1 (2018)
  - Asih 2 (2020)
  - Ivanna (2022)
  - Ivanna 2 (TBA)
- The 3rd Eye Series
  - The 3rd Eye 1 (2017)
  - The 3rd Eye 2 (2019)
- Gasing Tengkorak (2017)
- Bayi Gaib: Bayi Tumbal Bayi Mati (2018)
- DreadOut based on DreadOut series by Digital Happiness
  - DreadOut (2018)
- Pamali based on Pamali: Indonesian Folklore Horror by StoryTale Studios
  - Pamali (2022)
  - Pamali: The Corpse Village (2023)
  - Pamali: The Little Devil (2025)
- The Doll Series
  - The Doll (2016)
  - The Doll 2 (2017)
  - Sabrina (2018)
  - The Doll 3 (2022)
  - The Doll: Ghawiah (2026)
- Panggonan Wingit Series
  - The Haunted Hotel (2023)
  - The Haunted Apartment - Miss K (2024)
- Rasuk (2018)
- Pacar Hantu Perawan (2011), a film about lagic powers bathing rituals, with Vicky Vette, Dewi Perssik and Olga Syahputra
- May the Devil Take You or (Sebelum Iblis Menjemput) Series
  - May the Devil Take You: Chapter 1 (2018)
  - May the Devil Take You: Chapter 2 (2020)
  - May the Devil Take You: Chapter 3 (TBA)
- Sakral (2018)
- Alas Pati: Hutan Mati (2018)
- Perjanjian dengan Iblis (2019)
- Impetigore (2019)
- MatiAnak (2019)
- Tembang Lingsir (2019)
- Ratu Ilmu Hitam (1981)
  - The Queen of Black Magic (2019) Reboot of Ratu Ilmu Hitam (1981)
- Kutuk (2019)
- Lukisan Ratu Kidul (2019)
- Makmum (2019)
- Affliction (2021)
- Desa Penari Series
  - KKN di Desa Penari (2022)
  - Badarawuhi di Desa Penari (2024)
- Qodrat Series
  - Qodrat (2022)
  - Qodrat 2 (2025)
  - Dance of the Damned (2026)
  - Qodrat 3 (TBA)
  - Dance of the Damned 2 (TBA)
- Hidayah (2023)
- Sewu Dino Series
  - Sewu Dino (2023)
  - Janur Ireng (2025)
- Waktu Mahgrib Series
  - Waktu Mahgrib (2023)
  - Waktu Mahgrib 2 (2025)
- Grave Torture (2024)
- Do You See What I See (2024)
- Respati by Ragiel JP
  - Malam Pencabut Nyawa (2024)
- Kereta Berdarah (2024)
- Menjelang Ajal (2024)
- Pembantaian Dukun Santet (2025)
- Almarhum (2025)
- Pabrik Gula (2025)
- Jalan Pulang (2025)
- The Book of Sijjin and Illiyyin (2025)
- The Elixir (2025)
- Alas Roban (2026)
- Ghost in the Cell (2026)

== Notable directors ==
- Sisworo Gautama Putra
- Tjut Djalil
- The Mo Brothers (Kimo Stamboel and Timo Tjahjanto)
- Joko Anwar
- Awi Suryadi

== Highest-grossing horror films ==
Rank	Title	Admissions	Year	Director
1	KKN di Desa Penari	10,061,033	2022	Awi Suryadi
2	Satan's Slaves 2: Communion	6,391,982	2022	Joko Anwar
3	Vina: Sebelum 7 Hari	5,815,945	2024	Anggy Umbara
4	Sewu Dino	4,886,406	2023	Kimo Stamboel
5	Pabrik Gula	4,726,760	2025	Awi Suryadi
6	Satan's Slaves	4,206,103	2017	Joko Anwar
7	Dancing Village: The Curse Begins	4,015,120	2024	Kimo Stamboel
8	Grave Torture	4,000,826	2024	Joko Anwar
9	Danur: The Last Chapter	3,619,565	2026	Awi Suryadi
10	Ghost in the Cell	3,376,865	2026	Joko Anwar

== Other media ==
=== Video games ===
Examples of Indonesian horror games based on folklore story, such as DreadOut and Pamali: Indonesian Folklore Horror

== See also ==
- Cinema of Indonesia
- Folk horror
