= Marissa Anita =

Indonesian actress and journalist

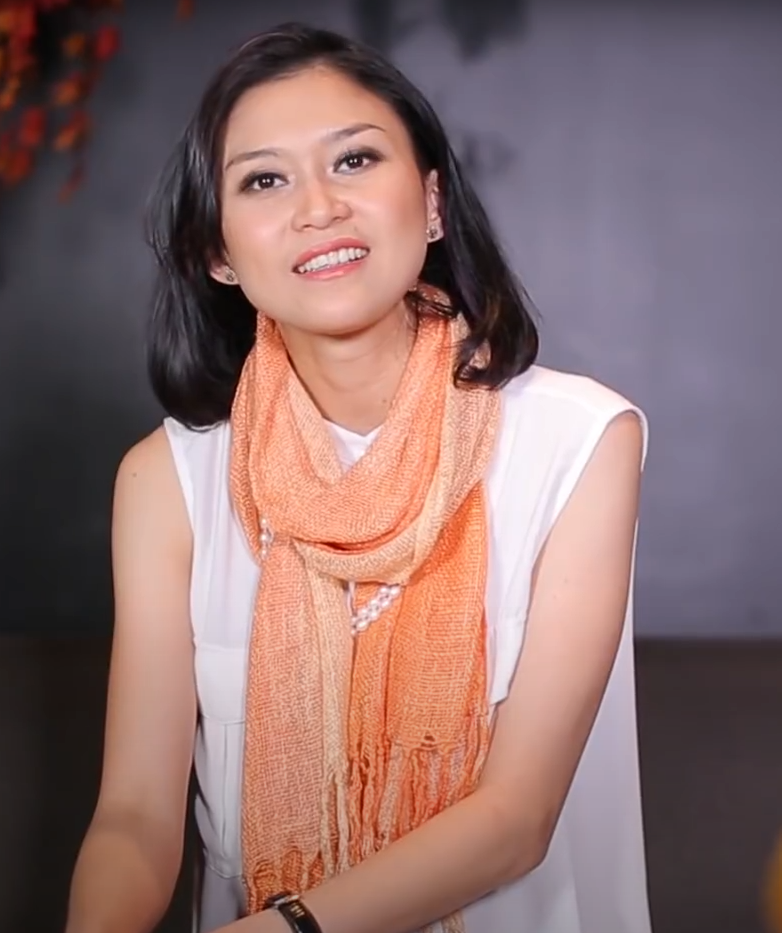
- Anita in 2017
- Born: 29 March 1983 (age 43); Surabaya, East Java, Indonesia
- Education: Atma Jaya Catholic University; University of Sydney; Loughborough University
- Occupations: Journalist; actress; presenter
- Years active: 2005–present
- Website: marissaanita.com

Marissa Anita (born in Surabaya, East Java, Indonesia on 29 March 1983) is an Indonesian journalist, actress and television news presenter. She began her acting career as a theatre actress in 2005, but rose to prominence in 2008 as a TV news reporter and later anchor for Metro TV. Her acting career took off in 2013 with a supporting role in Lucky Kuswandi's drama In the Absence of the Sun, for which she won a Maya Award for Best New Actress.

She has received three Citra Award for Best Supporting Actress nominations for her roles in Joko Anwar's Impetigore (2020) as well as Lucky Kuswandi's Galih & Ratna (2017) and Ali & Ratu Ratu Queens (2021), winning the latter. In addition to her Maya Award for Best New Actress trophy, she has also received three additional nominations: Best Actress in a Leading Role (Solo, Solitude) and Best Actress in a Supporting Role (Impetigore and Ali & Ratu Ratu Queens).

== Early life ==
Anita is of Minangese Indonesian descent from her mother's side and a mix of Javanese and Chinese descent from her father's side. She is the middle child in her family and she has an older brother and a younger brother. Anita graduated top of her class with a bachelor's degree in TESL from Atma Jaya Catholic University in 2005, followed by a master's degree in Media Practice from the University of Sydney in 2007 and another master's degree in Digital Media and Society from Loughborough University in 2017.

== Career ==
Anita began acting in stage plays in theater with The Jakarta Players community in 2005 while she was still studying in school and has since starred in more than a dozen plays. Upon completing her master's degree in Sydney, she joined the 24-hour news station Metro TV in 2008 as a reporter before becoming an anchor for the 8–11 program alongside Tommy Tjokro and Prabu Revolusi as well as the weekly English-language news program Indonesia Now alongside former CNN anchor Dalton Tanonaka.

In 2010, Anita starred opposite Atiqah Hasiholan in Broken Vase, a queer short film directed by Edward Gunawan. The following year, she again starred opposite Hasiholan in Borrowed Time, another short film co-directed by Gunawan and Lucky Kuswandi. In both short films, she was credited as Marissa Trigg. Anita then had cameo and minor roles in films such as Wanita Tetap Wanita, Nia Dinata's Arisan! 2, Joko Anwar's Ritual, and Rako Prijanto's 3 Nafas Likas.

Anita left Metro TV and joined NET in 2013 to host the Indonesia Morning Show. Since then, she began to appear in more substantial film roles while still maintaining her job as a television presenter. In 2014, she had a breakthrough with a role in Lucky Kuswandi's sophomore feature film In the Absence of the Sun. Her performance as Naomi, a former lover of Adinia Wirasti's character Anggia, garnered praise and earned her a Maya Award for Best New Actress.

Anita's next film appearances did not come until 2016 with a leading role in Yosep Anggi Noen's biographical drama Solo, Solitude as Sipon, the wife of disappeared poet and activist Widji Thukul and a supporting role in Kuswandi's 2017 drama Galih & Ratna as Tantri, the aunt of the titular character Ratna played by Sheryl Sheinafia. She was nominated for a Maya Award for Best Actress in a Leading Role for her performance in Solo, Solitude and a Citra Award for Best Supporting Actress for the latter.

In March 2019, Anita launched Greatmind.id, an online media platform that explores ideas, aspirations, and advocacy on various topics of life, serving as its lead editor. In June, Anita left her job at NET, months before she was billed to appear in two Joko Anwar's projects. In August, she appeared as Kurniati Dewi, the mother of Sancaka, in Gundala, the first entry in the Bumilangit Cinematic Universe film series. In October, she co-starred as Dini, the best friend of Tara Basro's character Maya in Impetigore, alongside Ario Bayu and Christine Hakim. Both films were critical and commercial success, with Impetigore being selected as the Indonesian entry for the Best International Feature Film category at the 93rd Academy Awards and breaking the record for most nominations at the 40th Citra Awards. Anita received her second Citra Award for Best Supporting Actress nomination for Impetigore, but lost to co-star Christine Hakim. She then reunited with Yosep Anggi Noen for The Science of Fictions.

In 2020, Anita appeared in two segments of the anthology film Quarantine Tales. She joined Najwa Shihab's Narasi TV in July to host her own talkshow Enaknya Diobrolin and the newly launched SEA Today in October to host its flagship morning news program.

Anita next appeared in Kamila Andini's Yuni and Lucky Kuswandi's Netflix original Ali & Ratu Ratu Queens. For her performance as Mia Harrington in the latter, she won the Citra Award for Best Supporting Actress, beating her co-star Asri Welas, Yuni co-star Asmara Abigail, Dea Panendra (Photocopier), and Djenar Maesa Ayu (Cinta Bete).

== Filmography ==
Title	Year	Role	Notes
2010	Broken Vase	Catherine	Short film Credited as Marissa Trigg
2011	Borrowed Time	Paula	Short film Credited as Marissa Trigg
2011	Arisan! 2	Bikhuni	Voice cameo
2012	Wanita Tetap Wanita	Rayya	Cameo
2012	Ritual	Woman on Photograph	Voice cameo
2014	3 Nafas Likas	Journalist	
2014	In the Absence of the Sun	Naomi	
2016	Solo, Solitude	Sipon	
2017	Galih & Ratna	Tantri	
2019	Gundala	Sancaka's Mother	
2019	Impetigore	Dini	
2019	Eggnoid: Love & Time Portal	Ran's Mother	
2019	The Science of Fictions	Kiosk Owner	
2020	Parental Bullying	Narrator	Short film
2020	Quarantine Tales	Ubai	Segment: "Nougat"
2020	Quarantine Tales	Risa	Segment: "Happy Girls Don't Cry"
2021	Ali & Ratu Ratu Queens	Mia Harrington	
2021	Yuni	Ms. Lies	
2022	Arini by Love.inc	Diana	
2022	Mendarat Darurat	Maya	
2024	Joko Anwar's Nightmares and Daydreams	Rania	Episode: "Poems and Pain"
2024	Crocodile Tears	Mama	
2025	A Normal Woman	Milla	
2025	Comedy Buddy	Ibu Cantik	

== Awards and nominations ==
Year	Award	Category	Work	Result
2014	Indonesia Film Critics Society	Breakthrough Actress	In the Absence of the Sun	Won
2014	27th Bandung Film Festival	Best Supporting Actress	In the Absence of the Sun	Nominated
2014	3rd Maya Awards	Best New Actress	In the Absence of the Sun	Won
2015	9th Indonesia Movie Awards	Best Chemistry	In the Absence of the Sun	Nominated
2015	9th Indonesia Movie Awards	Best Supporting Actress	In the Absence of the Sun	Nominated
2017	30th Bandung Film Festival	Best Supporting Actress	Solo, Solitude	Nominated
2017	6th Maya Awards	Best Actress in a Leading Role	Solo, Solitude	Nominated
2017	37th Citra Awards	Best Supporting Actress	Galih & Ratna	Nominated
2019	8th Maya Awards	Best Actress in a Supporting Role	Impetigore	Nominated
2020	40th Citra Awards	Best Supporting Actress	Impetigore	Nominated
2021	5th Tempo Film Festival	Best Supporting Actress	Yuni	Nominated
2021	34th Bandung Film Festival	Best Supporting Actress	Ali & Ratu Ratu Queens	Nominated
2021	41st Citra Awards	Best Supporting Actress	Ali & Ratu Ratu Queens	Won
2021	15th Indonesian Movie Awards	Best Actress	Ali & Ratu Ratu Queens	Nominated
2021	15th Indonesian Movie Awards	Favorite Actress	Ali & Ratu Ratu Queens	Nominated
2022	10th Maya Awards	Best Actress in a Supporting Role	Ali & Ratu Ratu Queens	Nominated
2024	XXX Minsk international festival «Лістапад-2024»	Best Actress	Crocodile Tears	Won
