= Joko Anwar's Nightmares and Daydreams =

Indonesian science fiction anthology television series

- Promotional release poster
- Genre: Science fiction; Supernatural horror; Mystery; Anthology
- Created by: Joko Anwar
- Composer: Aghi Narottama
- Country of origin: Indonesia
- Original language: Indonesian
- No. of seasons: 1
- No. of episodes: 7

Production
- Executive producer: Joko Anwar
- Producer: Tia Hasibuan
- Cinematography: Jaisal Tanjung; Fahim Rauyan
- Editors: Dinda Amanda; Joko Anwar
- Running time: 47–62 minutes
- Production companies: Come and See Pictures

Original release
- Network: Netflix
- Release: 14 June 2024

Joko Anwar's Nightmares and Daydreams (or simply Nightmares and Daydreams) is a supernatural horror mystery anthology television series created by the namesake filmmaker. It features seven interconnected science fiction stories set in Jakarta, some of which were co-written and directed by Anwar along with various filmmakers. It premiered on 14 June 2024 on Netflix.

== Premise ==
The series features stories "about ordinary people encountering strange phenomena" with multiple storylines which "intersect with each other and lead to a dramatic denouement", set in Jakarta spanning over three decades. Anwar mentioned that the stories were inspired by social and political issues in Indonesia.

== Production ==
=== Development ===
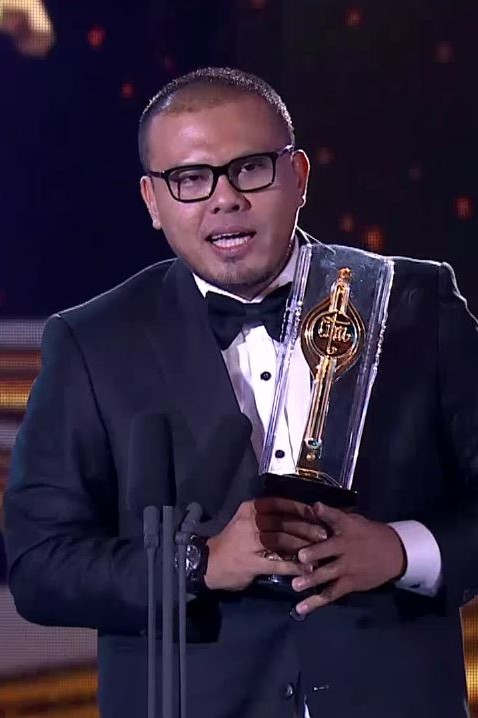
Joko Anwar

The project was announced along with six other Indonesian original Netflix programming on 2 September 2022 during Netflix's Waktu Netflix Indonesia event. In addition to creating the series, Anwar was set to direct and write some episodes. Upi Avianto was supposed to direct the series alongside Anwar, Randolph Zaini, and Ray Pakpahan, but was replaced by Tommy Dewo. On 21 April 2024, Netflix announced the release date of the series along with the confirmation of 65 actors joining the cast, including Ario Bayu, Marissa Anita, Fachri Albar, Nirina Zubir, Lukman Sardi, Yati Surachman, Happy Salma, Teuku Rifnu Wikana, Tora Sudiro, Djenar Maesa Ayu, Imelda Therinne, Sha Ine Febriyanti, Kartika Jahja, and others.

=== Filming ===
Principal photography took place around Jakarta, specifically, "The Orphan" was shot at the landfill in Bantar Gebang, Bekasi, West Java. Anwar revealed that most of the visual effects were done using practical effects.

== Episodes ==
No.	Title	Directed by	Written by	Original release date
1	"Old House"	Joko Anwar	Joko Anwar	14 June 2024
Cast: Ario Bayu, Yati Surachman, Faradina Mufti
2	"The Orphan"	Tommy Dewo	Rafki Hidayat	14 June 2024
Cast: Yoga Pratama, Nirina Zubir, Faqih Alaydrus
3	"Poems And Pain"	Randolph Zaini	Joko Anwar	14 June 2024
Cast: Marissa Anita, Restu Sinaga, Haydar Salishz
4	"Encounter"	Ray Pakpahan	Joko Anwar	14 June 2024
Cast: Lukman Sardi, Ersa Mayori, Teuku Rifnu Wikana
5	"The Other Side"	Randolph Zaini	Joko Anwar	14 June 2024
Cast: Sita Nursanti, Kiki Narendra
6	"Hypnotized"	Ray Pakpahan	Tia Hasibuan	14 June 2024
Cast: Fachri Albar, Poppy Sovia
7	"P.O. BOX"	Joko Anwar	Rafki Hidayat & Joko Anwar	14 June 2024
Cast: Asmara Abigail, Niken Anjani
