= Impetigore =

2019 Indonesian supernatural folk horror film directed by Joko Anwar

- Indonesian theatrical release poster
- Indonesian: Perempuan Tanah Jahanam
- Directed by: Joko Anwar
- Written by: Joko Anwar
- Produced by: Shanty Harmayn; Tia Hasibuan; Aoura Lovenson Chandra; Ben Soebiakto
- Starring: Tara Basro; Marissa Anita; Christine Hakim; Asmara Abigail; Ario Bayu
- Cinematography: Ical Tanjung
- Edited by: Dinda Amanda
- Music by: Bembi Gusti; Mian Tiara; Tony Merle; Aghi Narottama
- Production companies: Rapi Films; Base Entertainment; CJ Entertainment; Ivanhoe Pictures
- Distributed by: Rapi Films (Indonesia); Shudder Originals (United States)
- Release date: 17 October 2019
- Running time: 107 minutes
- Countries: Indonesia; United States; South Korea
- Languages: Indonesian; Javanese
- Budget: <$1 million
- Box office: Domestic: Rp 71.8 billion ($5.13 million) International: $10,717

Impetigore (Indonesian: Perempuan Tanah Jahanam, lit. 'Woman Of The Damned Land') is a 2019 Indonesian supernatural folk horror film written and directed by Joko Anwar. The film stars Tara Basro, Marissa Anita, Christine Hakim, Asmara Abigail, and Ario Bayu. The film follows Maya (Basro), who travels with her friend Dini (Anita) to her remote ancestral village seeking an inheritance.

Almost a decade in development, the film was announced in 2011 but was shelved. Seven years later, Impetigore was secured as an international co-production between Indonesian, South Korean and American production houses. Filming took place on location at various sites in East Java, facing challenges due to the remoteness of the main village location and Anwar being hospitalised with dengue fever.

Impetigore premiered in Indonesia on 17 October 2019 and internationally at the 2020 Sundance Film Festival. It was later acquired by Shudder for international streaming. The film was a box office success in Indonesia and received favourable reviews internationally, with critics praising its cinematography, sound design and use of Indonesian folklore. It was selected as the Indonesian official entry for the Best International Feature Film at the 93rd Academy Awards, but was not nominated. At the 40th Citra Awards, Indonesia's top film honours, the film received a record-breaking 17 nominations and won 6, including Best Picture, a second Best Director for Anwar, and a third supporting actress and ninth overall win for screen veteran Christine Hakim.

== Plot ==
Best friends Maya and Dini work as tollbooth collectors in Jakarta. During a night shift, Maya is attacked by a man wielding a golok, who claims to be from a village called Harjosari and calls Maya "Rahayu". Maya narrowly escapes being killed before the attacker is shot dead by the police. Later, Maya shows Dini an old photograph given to her by her aunt, who has raised her in the city since her parents' mysterious deaths. The photograph shows a young Maya, identified as Rahayu, with her deceased parents, Donowongso and Shinta, standing in front of a large house. Maya and Dini travel to the remote village of Harjosari to look for the house, hoping to sell it as an inheritance.

Posing as student researchers in Harjosari, the pair find the long-abandoned house and encounter cold, suspicious villagers. They witness daily funerals for children and observe that many headstones in the cemetery belong to newborns. Dini is lured away by the villagers, who slit her throat and flay her, mistaking her for Rahayu. While searching for Dini that evening, Maya spies the village chief and dalang, Saptadi, attending the birth of a skinless baby, whom he proceeds to drown. A sympathetic villager, Ratih, tells her that 20 years earlier, Donowongso, a wealthy dalang, made a pact with the devil and murdered three girls to heal his daughter Rahayu, who had been born without skin. Since then, all babies in the village have been born skinless.

The ghost of one of the girls reveals to Maya that, in order to end the curse, she must bury the slain girls' skin, which Donowongso had made into wayang kulit puppets. The ghost also reveals that Maya was born from the extramarital affair between Shinta and Saptadi. Disapproving of the affair, Saptadi's dukun mother, Misni, jinxed Saptadi so that he would forget Shinta and cursed Maya, who had been named Rahayu at birth, to be born skinless. Donowongso then sacrificed three girls to cure Rahayu's condition and, in doing so, cursed the entire village. Saptadi subsequently killed Donowongso, Shinta, and a group of wayang musicians during a performance in front of the villagers, then framed Donowongso for the massacre. Misni later convinced the villagers that the curse could only be broken by flaying Rahayu and making puppets from her skin. Rahayu was rescued by her "aunt", who was in fact one of Donowongso's servants, and renamed Maya to conceal her identity.

Maya and Ratih bury the puppets made from the skin of the three girls, pacifying their spirits. Misni arrives with the villagers and captures Maya. Maya appeals to Saptadi, revealing the truth. As Misni moves to flay Maya, a remorseful Saptadi takes her hand and slits his own throat instead. Horrified, Misni slits her own throat to join her son. After Ratih announces the birth of the first healthy baby in Harjosari in 20 years, the villagers allow Maya to leave.

One year later, a villager suffers a violent miscarriage. Misni's ghost has extracted and devoured the foetus.

== Cast ==
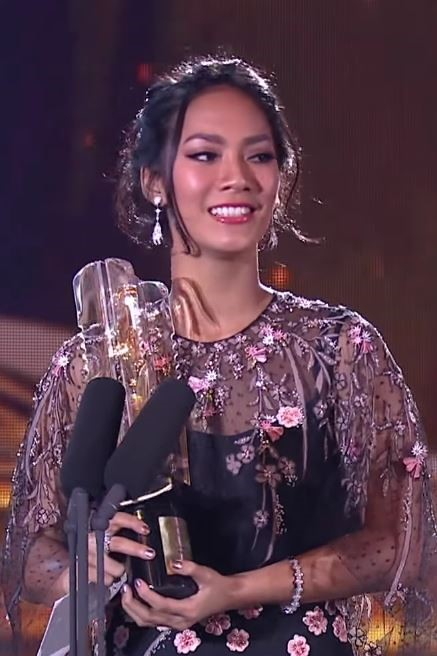
Tara Basro

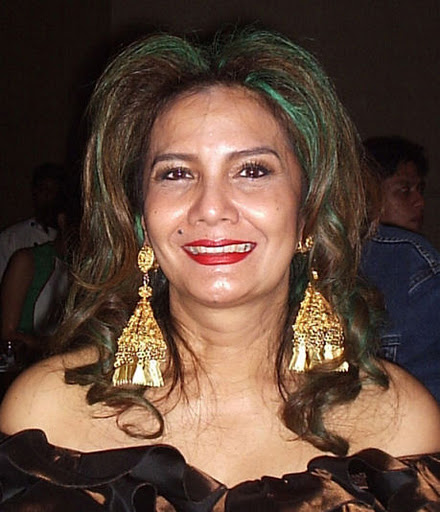
Christine Hakim

Cast adapted from RogerEbert.com.

- Tara Basro as Maya / Rahayu
- Christine Hakim as Nyi Misni
- Ario Bayu as Ki Saptadi
- Marissa Anita as Dini
- Asmara Abigail as Ratih
- Zidni Hakim as Ki Donowongso
- Faradina Mufti as Nyai Shinta
- Kiki Narendra as Bambang

== Production ==
=== Development ===
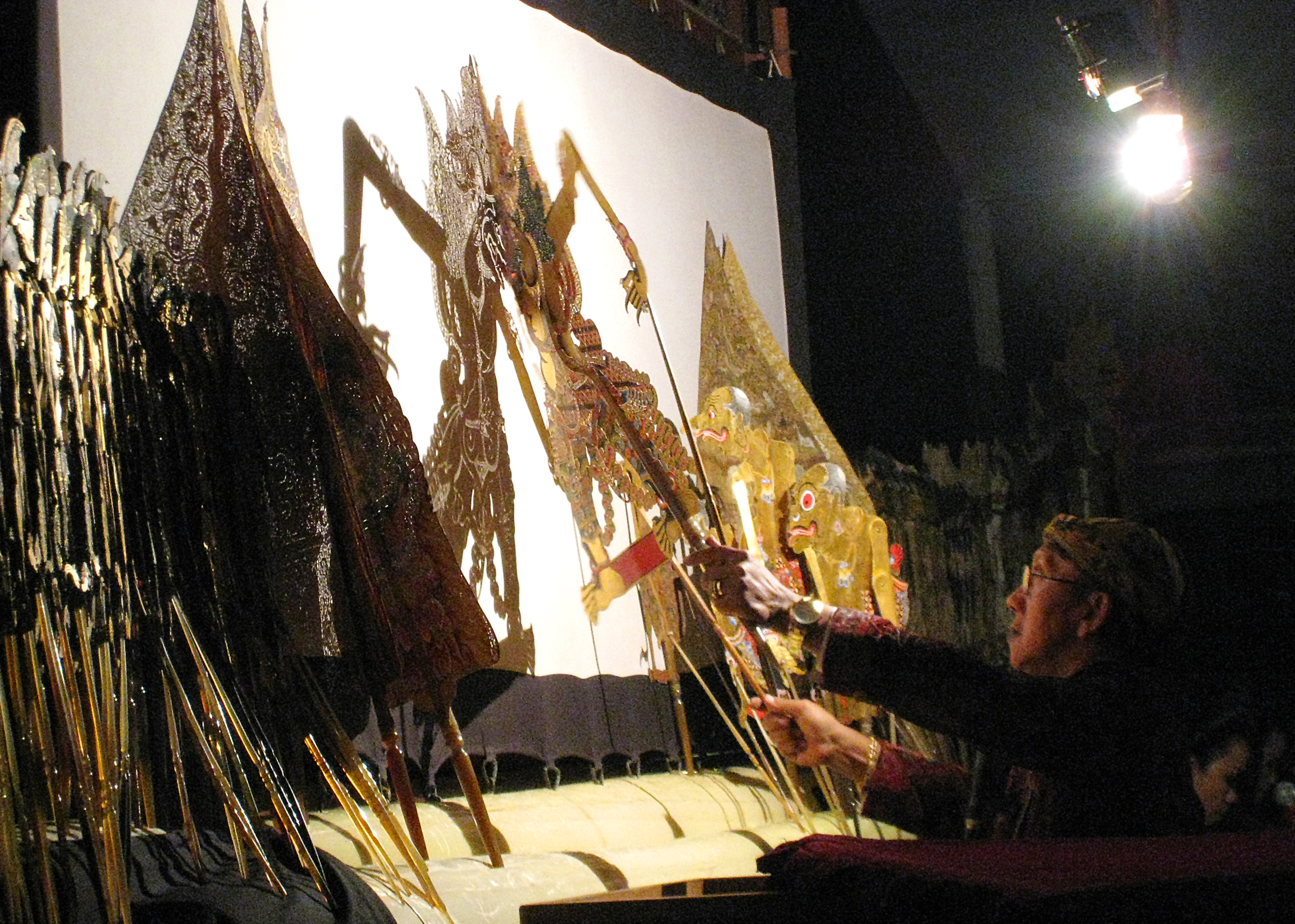
Wayang kulit, Indonesian traditional shadow puppetry, and dalang (puppeteers) are a central part of Impetigore.

Director and writer Joko Anwar described the film's concept as originating from a story his older brother had told him as a child; that the leather for Indonesian shadow puppets came from human skin. To form the concept for the film, he combined this with the idea of a strong but intimidating maternal character inspired by his own mother, and various Indonesian social and political issues. On the inclusion of Indonesian folklore elements, Anwar said "It's not a choice, it comes naturally. I grew up reading and being told about this type of folklore all the time. It's even taught in schoolbooks in Indonesia".

In 2011, a poster and Twitter account were made to promote the film, which was set to be produced by Lifelike Pictures, but the project was cancelled. Anwar also said difficulties finding a filming location that matched the script and a lack of budget led to the project being shelved. He later said he "kept fixing the story each year while at the same time also searching for the right partner to make this film".

The project was revived seven years later, when Ivanhoe Pictures announced a three-film collaboration with Anwar which includes Impetigore, Ghost in the Cell, and The Vow. The film was an international co-production between Indonesia's Rapi Films and BASE Entertainment, South Korea's CJ Entertainment and American company Ivanhoe Pictures. CJ Entertainment had previously had major international success with Crazy Rich Asians (2018), and intended to increase their presence in Southeast Asia. Anwar announced on Instagram that the film would be called Perempuan Tanah Jahanam on 31 December 2018. In February 2019, Anwar announced the cast members, including frequent collaborators Tara Basro, Marissa Anita, Asmara Abigail, Ario Bayu, and Arswendi Nasution. Christine Hakim's casting, announced at the same time, represented the first time she had appeared in a horror film in her 46-year career.

Although the film is primarily in Indonesian, some older characters speak Javanese.

=== Filming ===
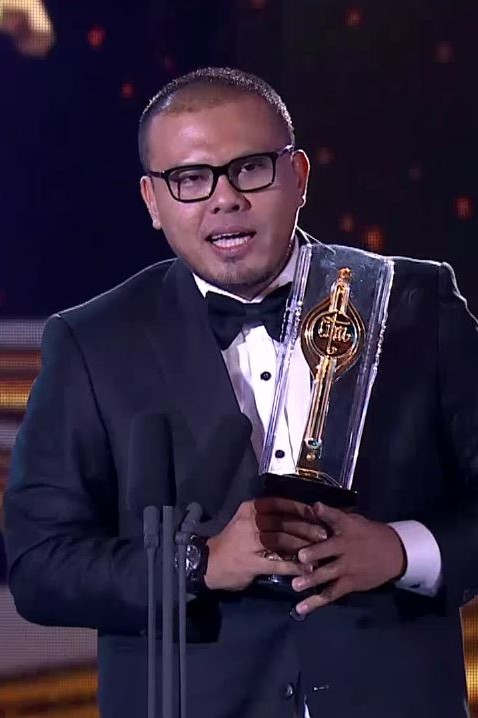
Director and writer Joko Anwar contracted dengue fever on the first day of filming Impetigore.

Filming began in March 2019, and was primarily shot on location in Banyuwangi, Lumajang and Ijen in East Java. The film crew spent three months searching for a village that matched the location described in the script. The village chosen, which was established in 1941 for workers on Dutch plantations, was so remote that the crew had to construct a path for vehicles and equipment to reach it. Anwar said that "due to the difficult terrain, the entire crew and cast members had to stay in the village throughout the filming. [Fortunately] the villagers warmly welcomed us, even cooked every day for us." Many local villagers appear as extras in the film.

Filming was expected to take 29 days, but experienced difficulties when Anwar contracted dengue fever on the first day and was hospitalised for eight days. Anwar later reflected that he had almost died during the illness, and that the shoot was "probably the most adventurous time" of his life. The film crew had to construct the village's first toilets themselves, as well as the house that was used for the main set. After filming, this infrastructure was left by the crew for use by village residents, with the house set converted into a public library with books provided by the crew.

=== Post-production ===
Sound mixing was conducted by the same team used by Thai filmmaker Apichatpong Weerasethakul, who won the 2010 Palme d'Or. BASE Entertainment announced that production had wrapped by April 2019. A teaser poster and trailer were released in August 2019. Titled Perumpuan Tanah Janah in Indonesia, the film's internationally marketed name Impetigore is a made-up word to name the disease suffered by the children in the film.

== Release ==
Impetigore was released in Indonesia on 17 October 2019. Plans to screen the film for free at the abandoned 1920s cinema Bioskop Grand Senen in Jakarta, as part of an effort to revive historic Indonesian cinemas, were later abandoned due to permit issues; demand was so high tickets had sold out within five minutes of the announcement. It premiered internationally at the Sundance Film Festival on 26 January 2020, and was later screened at the Rotterdam and Gothenburg Film Festivals. It also had theatrical releases in Malaysia, Hong Kong, Singapore, Brunei, Cambodia, Laos, Thailand, Macau and Myanmar.

In May 2020, it was released for streaming on Indonesian service GoPlay and was released in the United States, Canada and the UK on horror streaming service Shudder on 23 July 2020, after its distribution rights were acquired by the network as a Shudder original. This marked another collaboration of Anwar and Shudder, after Satan's Slaves became one of the network's biggest hits.

Impetigore was a box office success in Indonesia. It opened in first place in the local box office with an audience of 117,000 on its opening day and attracted 700,000 admissions in its first week of release. At the end of its domestic theatrical run, it ended up with 1.7 million admissions, making it the seventh highest grossing domestic film in 2019.

== Soundtrack ==
The film's soundtrack was created with the involvement of composer Rahayu Supanggah, and musical arrangers Aghi Narottama, Bemby Gusti and Tony Merle.

Perempuan Tanah Jahanam (Original Soundtrack)
No.	Title	Performer	Length
1.	"Pujaan Hati" (Darling)	The Spouse	2:30
2.	"Berlibur" (On Vacation)	The Spouse	2:43
3.	"Pria dengan Mobil Tua" (Man with the Old Car)		1:31
4.	"Perempuan Tanah Jahanam" (Impetigore)		1:41
5.	"Pesan dari Masa Lalu" (Messages from the Past)		0:38
6.	"Harjosari"		1:05
7.	"Kedatangan yang Diharapkan" (Expected Arrivals)		3:23
8.	"Malam Ini Ada yang Lahir" (Someone Is Born Tonight)		1:28
9.	"Darah" (Blood)		2:02
10.	"Kulit" (Skin)		4:33
11.	"Ki Donowongso" (Mr. Donowongso)		4:59
12.	"Kerasa Nggak?" (Do You Feel?)		2:37
13.	"Memburu Kutukan" (Chasing the Curse)		2:15
14.	"Kisah Wayang Berdarah" (Bloody Puppet Story)		6:40
15.	"Kubur Kami" (Bury Us)		2:23
16.	"Persembahan Terakhir" (Final Offerings)		6:46
17.	"Nyi Misni" (Mrs. Misni)		0:36
Total length:			48:00

== Reception ==
=== Critical response ===
On review aggregator Rotten Tomatoes, the film holds a 92% approval rating based on 39 reviews, with an average rating of 7.2/10. The site's critics consensus reads, "Impetigore uses its folk horror setting as the brutally effective backdrop for a supernatural story that sinks its hooks into the viewer and refuses to let go."

In The Jakarta Post, Reyzando Nawara gave a positive review, commenting on the film's relevance to Indonesian society, saying it "makes a very compelling argument about the evils of abused power and the danger it presents" across multiple generations. In Kompas, Mohammad Hilmi Faiq described the film as a new peak for Anwar.

Some reviewers in American publications commented that Impetigore was not too scary as it instead put emphasis on Indonesian cultural elements. Dennis Harvey wrote a positive review in Variety, praising the film's production design and sound, calling it a "handsome and atmospheric production" and "good, sometimes grisly fun that’s not terribly scary, particularly once hectic climactic events prove less suspenseful than the slow-burn buildup". Harvey critiqued the film's later acts, saying that the "convoluted later mix of chase scenes and explanatory flashbacks [feel] more like an awkward pileup of miscellaneous genre tropes". On RogerEbert.com, Peter Sobczynski gave the film three and a half out of four stars, commending film's style and use of Indonesian folklore, but criticised the flashback sequence and epilogue. He particularly highlighted the film's opening sequence, calling it "electrifying" and "absolutely spellbinding". In Screen Daily, Wendy Ide commended the film's atmosphere but critiqued its use of exposition, calling it "entertaining, pulpy horror, [that] focuses more on incorporating Indonesian cultural elements rather than delivering neatly packaged scares". Jacob Stolworthy in The Independent called the film "a must-watch for fans of scary films".

In a more mixed review, James Marsh in South China Morning Post rated the film 2.5 out of 5 stars and said the film was "unevenly paced and fails to capitalise on its grisly premise", but praised Basro's performance. Marco Ferrarese in Al Jazeera highlighted Impetigore as part of a new wave of low-budget horror films bringing increased international attention to Southeast Asia's film industry, alongside Malaysian film Roh. Distributed internationally by streaming services, Ferrarese highlighted it as one of several recent horror films from the region that received critical acclaim and festival attention beyond their native countries.

=== Accolades ===
Impetigore received a record 17 nominations and went on to be the biggest winner at the 2020 Indonesian Film Festival, the first for a horror film in the history of the Citra Awards. In accepting the award for Best Director, Anwar expressed his hope that the Indonesian film industry could raise its international profile, and said he believed that the COVID-19 pandemic had halted its progress when Indonesian film was "at its peak". Anwar won his second Citra Award for Best Director, and Hakim won the third Best Supporting Actress and ninth award overall of her career.

In November 2020, it was selected as the Indonesian official entry for the Best International Feature Film at the 93rd Academy Awards, but it was not nominated. When announcing the submission, Garin Nugroho, head of the Indonesian Academy Awards Selection Committee, cited the film's showcasing of Indonesian values and culture, as well as for its direction and script. The film was also submitted to the Best Foreign Language Film at the 78th Golden Globe Awards and was also not nominated.

Year	Award	Category	Recipient	Result	Ref
2019	8th Maya Awards	Best Feature Film	Impetigore	Nominated	
2019	8th Maya Awards	Best Director	Joko Anwar	Nominated	
2019	8th Maya Awards	Best Actress in a Supporting Role	Christine Hakim	Nominated	
2019	8th Maya Awards	Best Actress in a Supporting Role	Marissa Anita	Nominated	
2019	8th Maya Awards	Best Original Screenplay	Joko Anwar	Nominated	
2019	8th Maya Awards	Best Editing	Dinda Amanda	Nominated	
2019	8th Maya Awards	Best Art Direction	Frans X. R. Paat	Won	
2019	8th Maya Awards	Best Original Score	Aghi Narottama; Bemby Gusti; Tony Merle; Mian Tiara	Nominated	
2019	8th Maya Awards	Best Sound	Mohamad Ikhsan; Syamsurrijal; Anhar Moha	Nominated	
2019	8th Maya Awards	Arifin C. Noer Cup for Best Brief Appearance	Teuku Rifnu Wikana	Nominated	
2019	3rd Tempo Film Festival	Best Director	Joko Anwar	Nominated	
2019	3rd Tempo Film Festival	Best Supporting Actress	Christine Hakim	Won	
2019	3rd Tempo Film Festival	Best Screenplay	Joko Anwar	Nominated	
2020	Bucheon International Fantastic Film Festival	Melies Award for Best Asian Film	Impetigore	Won	
2020	40th Citra Awards	Best Picture	Impetigore	Won	
2020	40th Citra Awards	Best Director	Joko Anwar	Won	
2020	40th Citra Awards	Best Actor	Ario Bayu	Nominated	
2020	40th Citra Awards	Best Actress	Tara Basro	Nominated	
2020	40th Citra Awards	Best Supporting Actor	Kiki Narendra	Nominated	
2020	40th Citra Awards	Best Supporting Actress	Christine Hakim	Won	
2020	40th Citra Awards	Best Supporting Actress	Marissa Anita	Nominated	
2020	40th Citra Awards	Best Original Screenplay	Joko Anwar	Nominated	
2020	40th Citra Awards	Best Cinematography	Ical Tanjung	Won	
2020	40th Citra Awards	Best Editing	Dinda Amanda	Won	
2020	40th Citra Awards	Best Art Direction	Frans X. R. Paat	Nominated	
2020	40th Citra Awards	Best Original Score	Aghi Narottama; Bemby Gusti; Tony Merle; Mian Tiara	Nominated	
2020	40th Citra Awards	Best Sound	Mohamad Ikhsan; Syamsurrijal; Anhar Moha	Won	
2020	40th Citra Awards	Best Theme Song	"Pujaan Hati" by The Spouse & Tia Hasibuan	Nominated	
2020	40th Citra Awards	Best Costume Design	Isabelle Patrice	Nominated	
2020	40th Citra Awards	Best Makeup & Hairstyling	Darwyn Tse	Nominated	
2020	40th Citra Awards	Best Visual Effects	Abby Eldipie	Nominated	

== See also ==
- List of submissions to the 93rd Academy Awards for Best International Feature Film
- List of Indonesian submissions for the Academy Award for Best International Feature Film
- Indonesian horror
