= Comedy Buddy =

2025 comedy film by Aco Tenriyagelli

- Theatrical release poster
- Indonesian: Suka Duka Tawa
- Directed by: Aco Tenriyagelli
- Written by: Aco Tenriyagelli; Indriani Agustina
- Produced by: Tersi Eva Ranti; Ajish Dibyo
- Starring: Rachel Amanda; Teuku Rifnu Wikana; Marissa Anita
- Cinematography: Rahman Saade
- Edited by: Khairun Na'im
- Production companies: BION Sinema; Spasi Moving Image
- Release date: 6 December 2025 (Jogja)
- Running time: 127 minutes
- Country: Indonesia
- Language: Indonesian

Comedy Buddy (Indonesian: Suka Duka Tawa) is a 2025 comedy drama film directed by Aco Tenriyagelli in his directorial debut. It was written by Tenriyagelli and Indriani Agustina. The film stars Rachel Amanda as Tawa, an aspiring stand-up comedian.

The film had its world premiere as the closing film of the 20th Jogja-NETPAC Asian Film Festival on 6 December 2025. It was theatrically released in Indonesia on 8 January 2026.

== Premise ==
Tawa, a rising stand-up comedian, rose to fame by turning her traumatic childhood and the reputation of her estranged father, senior comedian Keset, into stand-up material.

== Cast ==
- Rachel Amanda as Tawa
- Teuku Rifnu Wikana as Keset, Tawa's absent father
- Marissa Anita as Cantik, Tawa's mother
- Arif Brata as Rais "Nasi"
- Gilang Bhaskara as Fachri
- Bintang Emon as Iyas
- Enzy Storia as Adin
- Abdel Achrian as Santos
- Mang Saswi as Japon
- Nazyra C. Noer as Anggun

=== Cameo appearances ===
- Pandji Pragiwaksono as himself
- Tara Basro and Ken Danuja as Viraling customers

== Production ==
In October 2025, it was reported that Aco Tenriyagelli would release his feature-length directorial debut film. Tenriyagelli stated that the concept for Comedy Buddy originated from his personal experience of using humor as a coping mechanism for trauma. He identified similar patterns and traits among his peers in the stand-up comedy community.

== Release ==
Comedy Buddy had its world premiere as the closing film of the 20th Jogja-NETPAC Asian Film Festival on 6 December 2025. It was released in Indonesian theatres on 8 January 2026. The film garnered 24,614 admissions on its opening day and concluded its theatrical run with a total of 91,772 admissions. Netflix acquired the film's distribution rights, releasing it on 21 May 2026.
