= Satan's Slaves 2: Communion =

2022 Indonesian horror film

- Theatrical release poster
- Indonesian: Pengabdi Setan 2: Communion
- Directed by: Joko Anwar
- Written by: Joko Anwar
- Produced by: Gope T. Samtani; Tia Hasibuan
- Starring: Tara Basro; Endy Arfian; Bront Palarae; Ratu Felisha; Nasar Anuz; Muhammad Adhiyat; Jourdy Pranata; Muzakki Ramdhan; Fatih Unru; Ayu Laksmi; Egi Fedly
- Cinematography: Ical Tanjung
- Edited by: Dinda Amanda
- Music by: Bemby Gusti; Tony Merle; Aghi Narottama
- Production companies: Rapi Films; Sky Media; Brown Entertainment; Legacy Pictures; Come and See Pictures
- Distributed by: Rapi Films
- Release date: 4 August 2022
- Running time: 119 minutes
- Country: Indonesia
- Language: Indonesian
- Budget: $1 million
- Box office: $19.3 million

Satan's Slaves 2: Communion (Indonesian: Pengabdi Setan 2: Communion) also referred to as Satan's Slaves 2 is a 2022 Indonesian supernatural horror film written and directed by Joko Anwar. It is the sequel to the 2017 film Satan's Slaves, itself based on the 1980 film Satan's Slave. It is the first Indonesian film to be released in IMAX format. Upon its release, Anwar indicated plans for a possible third installment in the series.

The film opened at number one at Indonesian box offices and surpassed one million admissions after two days, and surpassed two million admissions in just four days. As of 2022, Satan's Slaves 2: Communion is the fifth highest-grossing Indonesian film of all time, with 6.3 million admissions.

== Plot ==
In 1955, newspaper journalist Budiman is summoned by his friend Heru, a police commander, to Bosscha Observatory, where a cult ritual seems to have taken place overnight: dozens of exhumed corpses lay prostrate facing a framed portrait of Mawarni. Heru has been instructed to prevent publication of this story, so as not to damage the country’s image in light of the upcoming Bandung Conference, but he insists that Budiman publish the story through obscure magazines.

In 1984, Rini, her brothers Toni and Bondi, and their father Bahri have been living in a flat at the dilapidated Mandara Apartments in Jakarta for the past three years. Bahri seems to work odd jobs all day and always carries a briefcase, which he keeps locked at home. Budiman, now editor-in-chief of an occult magazine, receives Heru’s suicide note in the mail along with photos and drawings that suggest an upcoming cult activity at Mandara; they also reveal that Bahri was one of the police officers who took Budiman to see Heru in 1955. Meanwhile, the lift at Mandara malfunctions and falls, killing many tenants. At night, a storm rages and floods the building, trapping the tenants inside. Rini consoles Wisnu, a child whose mother was killed in the lift. Wisnu tells Rini that he and his mother used to communicate in a mysterious sign language that they learned from an occult book, so that his abusive father would not understand.

The flood cuts off electricity, and supernatural forces start harassing the tenants. In the building manager’s flat, Bondi and his friends find photos of the cult congregating every 29 years on 17 April, which is the next day. Meanwhile, Toni enters a hidden room inside a flat, where he finds photos of his deceased mother Mawarni, who is identified as Raminom. Toni shows them to Rini, and they recall that Mawarni started looking like Raminom after embarking on a musical career. Rini opens Bahri’s briefcase and finds severed human fingers. They find Ian, their deaf youngest brother who was taken by the cult, (Note: As depicted in Satan's Slaves.) in a top floor flat. Wisnu speaks with Ian in the mysterious sign language, and Ian says he is a friend.

The corpses rise and, with Raminom, haunt the remaining tenants to their deaths. Surrounded by the undead, the siblings and Wisnu run into Bahri, and are captured by the cult members. They awaken on a secret top floor, where the cult has begun their communion. Ian commands the cult and cheerfully executes Bahri by quartering. Budiman arrives, fires at the cult members, and repels Raminom. In the sign language, Wisnu instructs the cult to stop, as Rini strikes Ian unconscious. The siblings and Wisnu escape via boat with Budiman, who explains that Bahri persuaded Mawarni to join the cult in 1955 to have children and stardom. Bahri tried to get themselves out, but the cult required him to murder one thousand people to do so. As a result, Bahri had since been working as a sniper, performing extrajudicial killings for the Indonesian government. Budiman explains that tonight's communion was only part of a bigger plan.

The next day, Darminah and her husband Batara arrive at Mandara. She expresses disappointment that they were not present at the communion, but he reassures her that everything went according to plan. A photograph on the wall reveals that they attended the 1955 Bandung Conference, and they do not appear to have aged since.

== Cast ==
- Tara Basro as Rini Suwono
- Endy Arfian as Toni Suwono
- Bront Palarae as Bahri Suwono
- Ratu Felisha as Tari Daryati
- Nasar Anuz as Bondi Suwono
- Muhammad Adhiyat as Ian Suwono
- Jourdy Pranata as Dino Suhendar
- Muzakki Ramdhan as Wisnu Hendrawan
- Fatih Unru as Ari Gunawan
- Ayu Laksmi as Mawarni Suwono/Raminom
- Egi Fedly as Budiman Syailendra
- Nafiza Fatia Rani as Wina Endarti
- Kiki Narendra as Ustaz Mahmud
- Rukman Rosadi as Heru Kusuma
- Muhammad Abe as Ari's father
- Asmara Abigail as Darminah
- Fachri Albar as Batara
- Maera Panigoro as Diana Sasmi
- Sita Nursanti as Hayati Darsono
- Patty Sandya as Ari's mother
- Mian Tiara as Wisnu's mother
- Mukhlist Abot as Wisnu's father
- Aimee Saras as news anchor
- Ramadhan Al Rasyid as taxi driver
- Tommy Dewo as mourner
- Rieviena Yulieta as radio announcer
- Tia Hasibuan as radio caller

== Release ==
Satan's Slaves 2: Communion was released on August 4 in Indonesia, and August 11 in Malaysia.

Satan's Slaves 2: Communion was also as the first Indonesian and Southeast Asia film released on IMAX format. It also made it to 'Midnight Passion' section of 27th Busan International Film Festival to be screened in October 2022. Like its predecessor, it was acquired by Shudder in September 2022 for exclusive distribution in the U.S., Canada, the United Kingdom, Ireland, Australia, and New Zealand, with the platform announcing the film's streaming release date for November 4.

== Reception ==
=== Box office ===
Satan's Slaves 2: Communion opened with a record 701,891 admissions, which is the second highest opening day for local film. It surpassed 3 million viewers on 5th day of its release, as of August 25 it is the second highest grossing local film of the year 2022 in Indonesia with 6.3 million admission and an estimated gross Rp254 billion (US$17.09 million). In Malaysia, Satan's Slaves 2 has grossed RM9.5 million (US$2.1 million).

=== Critical reception ===
On the review aggregator website Rotten Tomatoes, 100% of 11 critics' reviews are positive, with an average rating of 6.3/10.

Richard Kulpers gave the film a positive review in Variety, saying "A couple of subplots don’t add much, and the frantic finale squeezes in more information than is required to pave the way for a sequel. But these are relatively minor flaws in a film distinguished by exciting visuals, top-notch production design, wonderfully gooey makeup design and convincing performances from a uniformly fine cast." In a 3.5 star review in Bloody Disgusting, Meagan Navarro concluded "Anwar’s commitment to horror and inventive scare crafting ensures that we’ll sign up for a third round to see where it goes from here."

== See also ==
- Indonesian horror
