= Alexandria (film) =

- Alexandria DVD cover
- Directed by: Ody C. Harahap
- Written by: Salman Aristo
- Produced by: Rexinema
- Starring: Marcel Chandrawinata, Julie Estelle, Fachri Albar
- Distributed by: Rexinema
- Release date: November 2005
- Running time: 110 minutes
- Country: Indonesia
- Language: Indonesian

Alexandria is a 2005 Indonesian film, featuring a soundtrack album by Indonesian pop rock band Peterpan and considered as the best selling soundtrack album in Indonesia with 1,3 million copies being sold.

== Plot ==
Bagas (Marcel Chandrawinata) has a crush on his neighbor and childhood friend, Alexandria (Julie Estelle), but he is unable to express it. Things change when Bagas realizes that his best friend, Rafi (Fachri Albar), is also pursuing Alexandria, and that she may like him as well.
