= August Melasz =

Indonesian actor

- Born: August Satria Purnama; 30 November 1951 (age 74); Surabaya, East Java, Indonesia
- Other name: August Melasz
- Occupation: Actor
- Years active: 1976 - present

August Satria Purnama or better known as August Melasz (born in Surabaya, East Java, Indonesia on November 30, 1951; age 67 years) is an Indonesian actor of mixed ethnic Dutch and Javanese descent.

== Filmography ==
- Pembalasan Naga Sakti (1976)
- Gadis Kampus (1979)
- Dr Siti Pertiwi Kembali ke Desa (1979)
- Seputih Hatinya, Semerah Bibirnya (1982)
- Di Balik Kelambu (1983) as Bakri
- Five Deadly Angels (1983)
- Noda X (1985)
- Final Score (1986)
- American Hunter (1988) as Johnny
- Istana Kecantikan (1989)
- Double Crosser (1990)
- Zig Zag (1991)
- Angel of Fury (1992) as Tony
- Issue (2005) as Irwin
- Dead Time: Kala (2007) as Hendro Waluyo
- Mereka Bilang, Saya Monyet! (2008)
- Layla Majnun (2021)

== External links and sources ==
- August Melasz at IMDb
