= Fachri Albar =

Indonesian actor and musician

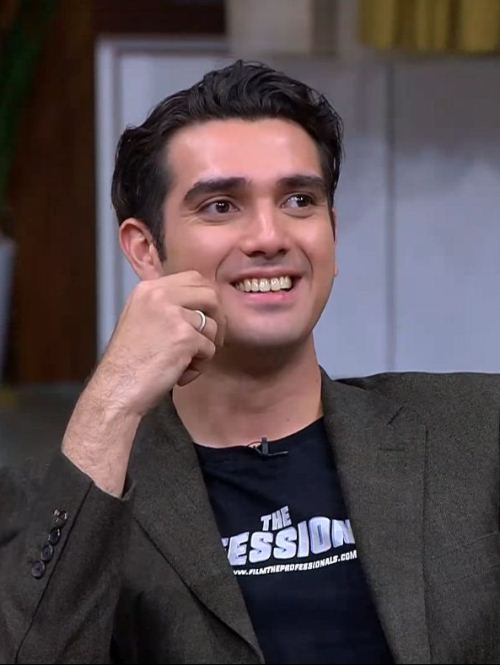
- Fachri Albar in 2018
- Born: November 15, 1981 (age 44); Jakarta, Indonesia
- Occupations: Celebrity, Musician
- Years active: 2005 - present
- Spouse: Renata Kusmanto (m. 2014)
- Relatives: Lies Permana Lestari (maternal grandmother); Sean Gelael (half brother)

Fachri Albar (born 15 November 1981) is an Indonesian actor and musician. He is best known for starring in Joko Anwar's Neo-noir thriller Dead Time: Kala in 2007 and psychological thriller The Forbidden Door in 2009.

== Career ==
=== Acting ===
Fachri Albar debuted on the small screen in a modern retelling of the folklore Malin Kundang opposite veteran actress Desy Ratnasari. The series premiered in January 2005 on SCTV and ran for two seasons, but Fachri Albar only appeared in one season. Fachri Albar then had his feature film debut in November 2005 with the release of Alexandria as one of the main characters opposite Marcel Chandrawinata, Julie Estelle, and Kinaryosih.

His next projects came in 2007 in the role of drag performer Amanda in Jakarta Undercover and as Janus in Dead Time: Kala. His performance in the latter earned him his first Citra Award nomination in the Best Actor category, losing to Deddy Mizwar (Nagabonar Jadi 2) as well as an MTV Indonesia Movie Awards in the Most Favorite Actor category, this time losing to Mizwar's co-star in Nagabonar Jadi 2, Tora Sudiro. He then appeared opposite Marsha Timothy in Anwar's follow-up release The Forbidden Door as Gambir, an artist who one day meets a young boy and starts to uncover secrets. The film was critically acclaimed and introduced Albar to the international scene through screenings at international film festivals.

After years of absence from films, Fachri Albar appeared in Richard Oh's experimental film Melancholy Is a Movement as himself as well as in a segment co-directed by Timo Tjahjanto and Gareth Evans for the horror anthology film V/H/S/2 in 2015. He then made a brief special appearance in a post-credit scene in Joko Anwar's 2017 international hit Satan's Slaves.

=== Music ===
Fachri Albar is a drummer for the punk rock band Jibriel. His brother Fauzy Albar is also part of the band as lead vocalist. The band released their debut single "Raih" in May 2007 and their debut studio album ...Memecah Kesunyian (lit. Breaking the Silence) in June the following year.

== Personal life ==
Fachri Albar is the son of rock star and vocalist Ahmad Albar of the legendary Indonesian rock band God Bless and actress Rini S. Bono. He is the middle of 3 brothers. His older brother Fauzi Albar is the lead vocal of Jibriel, the punk rock band of which Fachri Albar is also a member of as a drummer. In August 2018, Fachri Albar lost his other brother Faldi Albar due to liver failure. Fachri Albar is also a step brother to racing driver Sean Gelael by his mother's subsequent marriage to business mogul Ricardo Gelael.

On 12 June 2014, Fachri Albar married model and actress Renata Kusmanto. They have two children: son River Syech Albar and daughter Clover Satin Albar.

== Filmography ==
=== Film ===
Year	Film	Role	Notes
2005	Alexandria	Rafi Primasto	
2007	Jakarta Undercover	Amanda	
2007	Dead Time: Kala	Janus	
2009	The Forbidden Door	Gambir	
2015	V/H/S/2	Adam	Segment: "Safe Heaven"
2015	Melancholy Is a Movement	Himself	
2016	I Am Hope	David	
2016	Pesantren Impian	Umar	
2016	Terpana	Rafian	
2016	The Professionals	Abi	
2017	Bukan Cinta Malaikat	Rehan	
2017	Satan's Slaves	Batara	
2022	Satan's Slaves 2: Communion	Batara	
2024	Grave Torture	Sanjaya Arif	

=== Television ===
Year	Film	Role	Notes
2005	Malin Kundang	Malin	Main role (Season 1)
2005 - 2006	Jangan Pisahkan Aku		
2006	Cahaya Surga		1 episode
2007	Sujudku	Alif	Main role
2007	Tangisan Cinta		
2009	Cinta Nia		
2010	Mertua dan Menantu	Afian	
2012	Tobat Sambel	Yusuf	
2016	Para Pencari Tuhan	Fachri	Guest (Season 7)

== Awards and nominations ==
Year	Award	Category	Work	Result	Notes
2005	MTV Indonesia Movie Awards	Favorite Heart Melting Moment	Alexandria	Nominated	shared with Julie Estelle & Marcel Chandrawinata
2007	27th Citra Awards	Best Actor	Dead Time: Kala	Nominated	
2007	MTV Indonesia Movie Awards	Favorite Actor	Dead Time: Kala	Nominated	
2010	Kaskus untuk Film Indonesia	Best Actor	The Forbidden Door	Won	
