= Tara Basro =

Indonesian actress (born 1990)

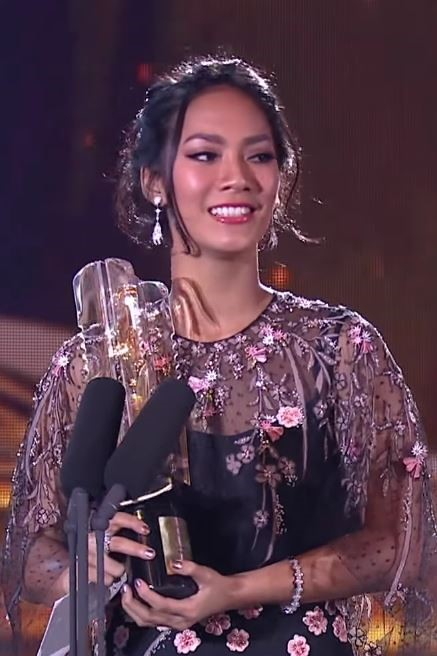
- Basro accepting the Best Actress award at the 2015 Indonesian Film Festival
- Born: Andi Mutiara Pertiwi Basro; 11 June 1990 (age 35); Jakarta, Indonesia
- Education: TAFE NSW
- Occupation: Actress
- Years active: 2011–present
- Spouse: Daniel Adnan (m. 2020)
- Awards: Citra Award for Best Actress

Tara Basro (born 11 June 1990) is an Indonesian actress and musician. Born in Jakarta and educated in Australia, she began her career as a teenaged model before becoming established in the Indonesian film industry. Beginning with A Copy of My Mind (2015), Basro became a frequent collaborator of director Joko Anwar, starring in his horror films Satan's Slaves (2017) and Impetigore (2019), and superhero film Gundala (2019). She was awarded Citra Award for Best Actress in 2015.

== Early life and education ==
Tara Basro was born Andi Mutiara Pertiwi Basro on 11 June 1990 in Jakarta. Her father works for the airline Industry. Basro started her career in the entertainment industry when she joined the teen modeling competition Gadis Sampul, Indonesia in 2005. She then moved to Australia with her parents and continued her studies. Basro graduated from TAFE NSW.

== Acting career ==
Upon returning to Indonesia after completion of her studies, she participated in many auditions for films but struggled to be cast. In 2011, Tara auditioned for a musical theatre where she met the casting director of her breakthrough film Catatan (Harian) Si Boy. She earned a nomination for Best Female Newcomer at the Indonesian Movie Awards. In 2012, she starred in an anthology horror film Hi5teria where she starred as the leading role of the segment "Pasar Setan". The same year, she also starred in Rumah dan Musim Hujan, but released in 2018 under the title Hoax. In 2013, she played as the materialistic girlfriend of Pandji Pragiwaksono's character in the film Make Money.

Tara had four film releases in 2014. Her first appearance was in a historical silat film The Golden Cane Warrior, where she starred as Gerhana. Then, she played a small part in Japanese-Indonesian action film Killers. She starred as a marine biologist in a romantic drama The Right One. Tara next starred in an anthology family film titled Princess, Bajak Laut & Alien.

Tara starred in the role as Asa, the leading role of a surrealist film Another Trip to the Moon directed by Ismail Basbeth. The film premiered at the 2015 International Film Festival Rotterdam competing for Hivos Tiger Award. She also starred as a guerrilla gardener in a documentary Flutter Echoes and Notes Concerning Nature.

Tara next starred in A Copy of My Mind, a film directed by Joko Anwar. It featured her in the role Sari, a cheap salon worker who falls in love with a pirated DVDs subtitle maker. It was screened at the 2015 Toronto International Film Festival and 72nd Venice International Film Festival. She won the Citra Award for Best Leading Actress. In 2015, she also starred in two television series, HBO's Halfworlds and NET.'s The East. In the former, also written and directed by Joko Anwar, she played as a demit or demon named Ros. In The East, she was cast as Mutia, the executive producer of a real life-inspired program Entertainment News.

Following the success of A Copy of My Mind, Tara portrayed Kusuma Wardhani in 3 Srikandi, which reunited her with Reza Rahadian. It tells the story of Indonesian archer team at the 1988 Summer Olympics. She starred in musical drama film Three Sassy Sisters, inspired by Usmar Ismail's Tiga Dara (1956). She portrays the middle sister Ella. The same year, she was appointed as the host of The Amazing Race Asia 5 along with Allan Wu.

In 2017, Tara starred in Joko Anwar's horror Satan's Slaves. It is a loose remake-cum-prequel to the 1980 film of the same name directed by Sisworo Gautama Putra. She starred as Rini, the oldest of four. The film has been watched by 4.2 million moviegoers, making it as the best-selling domestic Indonesian film of 2017. She was cast in Perempuan-Perempuan Chairil, a play inspired by the life of poet Chairil Anwar. She played as Sumirat, one of Anwar's partner.

In 2018, she was cast in the role as Kanti, a successful banker in Viu's drama series Halustik.

In 2019, she was cast in two of Anwar's directed films, Impetigore and Gundala.

== Music career ==
Starring in 2016 musical film Three Sassy Sisters, Basro performed in five tracks of the soundtrack with the cast, including a solo number titled "Nomor Dua". In 2018, Basro featured on a track titled "Jawaban" by musician Petra Sihombing along with Vinson Vivaldi in Sihombing's fourth studio album, 1/4. Along with producer Greybox, she released a song titled "Green Kit Kat" in 2019.

In 2021, along with Indonesian indie rock band FLEUR!, Basro featured on a single titled "Suara Disko" by disco duo Diskoria.

== Personal life ==
Basro married Czech-born Indonesian actor Ken Danuja in Bandung, West Java, on 17 June 2020.

== Filmography ==
=== Film ===
Year	Title	Role	Notes
2011	Catatan (Harian) Si Boy	Putri	
2012	Rumah dan Musim Hujan	Adek	Re-released in 2018 under the title Hoax
2012	Hi5teria	Sari	Segment: "Pasar Setan"
2013	Make Money	Imelda	
2014	The Golden Cane Warrior	Gerhana	
2014	Killers	Dewi	
2014	The Right One	Alice	
2014	Princess, Bajak Laut dan Alien	Miss Kei	Segment: "Princess, Bajak Laut & Alien"
2015	Another Trip to the Moon	Asa	
2015	Flutter Echoes and Notes Concerning Nature	Guerrilla gardener	
2016	A Copy of My Mind	Sari	Citra Award for Best Actress
2016	3 Srikandi	Kusuma Wardhani	
2016	Three Sassy Sisters	Ella	
2017	Satan's Slaves	Rini Suwono	
2019	Gundala	Wulan / Merpati	
2019	Impetigore	Maya / Rahayu	
2022	Satan's Slaves 2: Communion	Rini Suwono	
2025	Comedy Buddy	Viraling customer	Cameo appearance

=== Television ===
Year	Title	Role	Network	Notes
2015–2016	Halfworlds	Ros	HBO Asia	Season 1; 8 episodes
2015–2016	The East	Mutia	NET.	Season 1
2016	The Amazing Race Asia	Co-host	AXN Asia	Season 5
2018	Halustik	Kanti	Viu	Main role; 13 episodes
2023	The Talent Agency	Herself	Disney+ Hotstar	Episode: "Tara"

=== Stage ===
Year	Production	Role	Location
2017	Perempuan-Perempuan Chairil	Sumirat	Teater Jakarta, Taman Ismail Marzuki, Jakarta; 11–12 November 2017

=== Music video ===
Year	Title	Performer(s)	Ref.
2016	"I Want You, Love"	Teza Sumendra	
2024	"Semua lagu cinta"	Sal Priadi	

== Awards and nominations ==
Year	Award	Category	Work	Result
2012	Indonesian Movie Awards	Best Newcomer Actress	Catatan (Harian) Si Boy	Nominated
2012	Indonesian Movie Awards	Favorite Newcomer Actress	Catatan (Harian) Si Boy	Nominated
2015	Indonesian Film Festival	Citra Award for Best Leading Actress	A Copy of My Mind	Won
2016	Indonesian Movie Actor Awards	Best Actress	A Copy of My Mind	Nominated
2016	Indonesian Movie Actor Awards	Favorite Actress	A Copy of My Mind	Nominated
2016	Indonesian Movie Actor Awards	Best Chemistry (with Chicco Jericho)	A Copy of My Mind	Nominated
2016	Usmar Ismail Awards	Best Actress	A Copy of My Mind	Nominated
2016	Usmar Ismail Awards	Favorite Actress	A Copy of My Mind	Won
2020	Indonesian Film Festival	Citra Award for Best Leading Actress	Impetigore	Nominated
