= Joko Anwar =

Indonesian filmmaker and actor (born 1976)

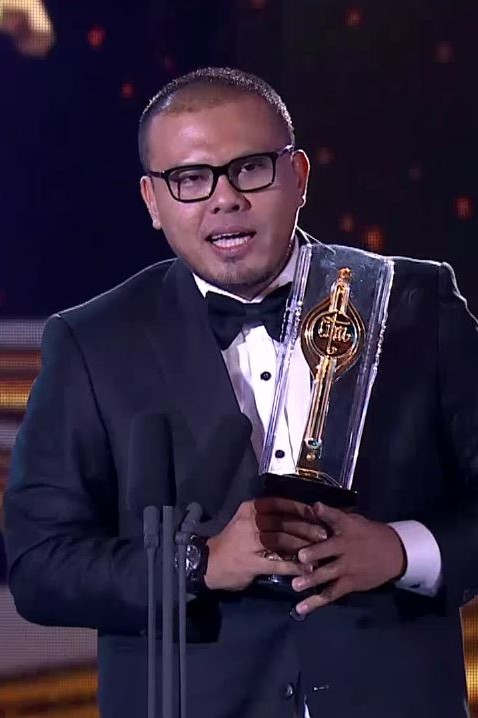
- Anwar receiving Citra Award for Best Director of his movie A Copy of My Mind at 2015 Indonesian Film Festival
- Born: Joko Eddy Haryanto; 3 January 1976 (age 50); Medan, North Sumatra, Indonesia
- Education: Bandung Institute of Technology
- Occupations: Film director, screenwriter, producer
- Years active: 2003–present
- Awards: Full list
- Website: Official website

Joko Anwar (born 3 January 1976) is an Indonesian film director, producer, screenwriter, and actor. Prior to becoming a filmmaker, he worked as a journalist and film critic.

Anwar first rose to prominence for co-writing Nia Dinata's 2003 hit Arisan! which won five awards at the 2004 Citra Award. He then made his feature film directorial debut with the romantic comedy Joni's Promise in 2005, gaining a Best Director nomination at the 2005 Citra Award. He has since directed a wide range of genres: the noir thriller Dead Time: Kala (2007), psychological thriller The Forbidden Door (2009), supernatural horror Satan's Slaves (2017) and its sequel Satan's Slaves 2: Communion (2022), and live-action superhero Gundala (2019). In 2024, Anwar's anthology series Joko Anwar's Nightmares and Daydreams was released on Netflix.

Anwar has won 3 Citra Awards out of 13 nominations for directing and screenwriting. He won the Best Director Awards twice: in 2015 for the urban drama A Copy of My Mind and in 2020 for the folk horror Impetigore as well as the Best Screenplay Award in 2008 for co-writing Mouly Surya's Fiksi.. He has also been nominated for a total of 7 Maya Awards, winning Best Director for Satan's Slaves in 2017. As of 2022, two of Anwar films are in top 10 list of most watched Indonesian films of all time: Satan's Slaves 2: Communion and Satan's Slaves, respectively at third and ninth, with 6.39 million and 4.2 million admissions.

As an actor, Anwar has appeared in multiple films, including starring roles in Edwin's award-winning feature film debut Blind Pig Who Wants to Fly opposite Ladya Cheryl.

In 2019, Indonesia Tatler included Anwar in its list of the most influential film directors in modern Indonesian cinema.

== Early life ==
Anwar was born in Medan, North Sumatra where he grew up watching kung fu and horror films. He went to the highschool of SMA Negeri 1 Medan, a public school, and was selected as a member of the 1991 National Paskibraka team, representing North Sumatra Province.

== Career ==
=== 2003–2008: Arisan!, directorial debut, and mainstream success ===
During an interview with Nia Dinata, who was gaining praise for her 2002 release Ca-bau-kan, for The Jakarta Post, Anwar impressed the filmmaker who in turn asked him to join a project she was working on. The two co-wrote the screenplay for what would be Dinata's biggest hit to date Arisan! released in 2003. The film won rave reviews and snatched multiple Best Film awards at the 2004 Citra Award, the 2004 MTV Indonesia Movie Awards, and the 2004 Bandung Film Festival. Dinata and Anwar also won praise for their screenplay, receiving a Citra Award nomination for Best Screenplay.

In 2005, Anwar made his directorial debut with the romantic comedy Joni's Promise (Janji Joni) with a star-studded cast that includes Nicholas Saputra, Mariana Renata, Rachel Maryam, Surya Saputra, and dozens of celebrity cameos, including Nia Dinata, based on a story he first wrote in 1998. The film propelled Anwar to mainstream success as it became a box office hit and earned 9 nominations at the 2005 Citra Award, including Best Film and Best Director for Anwar, losing to the biographical drama Gie and Hanung Bramantyo (Brownies) respectively. The film was credited with reviving the career of Barry Prima, an international martial artist and actor, who is Anwar's childhood hero.

In 2007, Joko Anwar wrote and directed Dead Time: Kala, Indonesia's first film noir feature film. It won rave reviews from critics with Sight & Sound picking it as one of the year's best while naming Anwar as one of the smartest filmmakers in Asia. The film was screened at numerous film festivals and won a Jury Prize at the 2007 New York Asian Film Festival. The Hollywood Reporter praised the film as "a sophisticated noir whodunit in homage to Fritz Lang's M". In the same year, Anwar wrote the screenplay for two other major releases: Dimas Djayadiningrat's sex comedy Quickie Express and an adaptation of Moammar Emka's best-selling novel, Jakarta Undercover. The former won Best Film at the 2008 Jakarta International Film Festival.

In 2008, Anwar co-wrote the screenplay for psychological thriller fiksi., Mouly Surya's directorial debut. The film was a huge hit and received universal acclaim. At the 2008 Citra Award, it received 10 nominations and won 4, including Best Screenplay, giving Anwar his first Citra Award.

=== 2009–2016: International recognition and Citra Award for Best Director ===
Anwar explored the psychological thriller genre in his next film, The Forbidden Door (Pintu Terlarang), which was released in 2009. Starring Fachri Albar and Marsha Timothy as a married couple with dark secrets, the film gained notable recognition from the international film community. TIME magazine film critic Richard Corliss wrote that the film could be "Anwar's calling card for international employment, if only Hollywood moguls wanted something out of their own narrow range" and that it is "an example of what movies could be but rarely dare to try". Maggie Lee of The Hollywood Reporter wrote that it "would make [Alfred] Hitchcock and [Pedro] Almodóvar proud" while praising Anwar for "[accessorizing] his creepy suspense-horror with a dazzling array of auteur-homage". The film was screened at several international film festivals, including The Times BFI London Film Festival, the International Film Festival Rotterdam, and the Bucheon International Fantastic Film Festival, where it won the Best of Bucheon award. In the same year, he also played a minor role in Macabre, Timo Tjahjanto's and Kimo Stamboel's break-out slasher hit. In 2013, he appeared as a shady film producer in Sammaria Simanjuntak's satirical comedy Demi Ucok.

Anwar's next release was the horror-thriller Modus Anomali, which premiered in Indonesia in April 2012. Anwar cast rising star Rio Dewanto in the lead role as a man who must rescue his family from a killer who is hunting them. The film was screened at the South by Southwest where it received generally positive reviews including from Richard Kuipers of Variety who called it a "brainteaser" and that "this extreme arthouse entry will leave a lasting impression on many auds". It received theatrical release in France and was retitled as Ritual for its North American release.

In 2015, Anwar released his fifth feature film the urban drama A Copy of My Mind with Chicco Jerikho and Tara Basro in the lead roles. Shot only in 8 days, the film was the only film from Southeast Asia to be screened at the 2015 Venice Film Festival. At the 2015 Citra Award, the film was nominated for 7 awards, including Best Film with Anwar winning Best Director for the first time and Basro winning Best Actress in addition to another win for sound mixing.

=== 2017–2019: Satan's Slaves, Gundala, Impetigore, and second Citra Award for Best Director ===
In his first supernatural horror effort, Anwar released his sixth feature film Satan's Slaves (Pengabdi Setan) in 2017. A loose remake of the 1980 cult classic of the same name, Satan's Slaves is the highest-grossing Indonesian film of 2017 as well as the highest-grossing horror film of all time in the country with 4.2 million admissions. It also fared well in other territories, including becoming the highest-grossing Indonesian film ever to be released in Malaysia. At the 37th Citra Awards, the film won 7 out of its 13 nominations. At the second Overlook Film Festival, the film won the Feature Film Jury Prize. Anwar also co-wrote the screenplay for Stip & Pensil with Ernest Prakasa and Bene Dion Rajagukguk, for which they were nominated at the 2017 Citra Awards for Best Original Screenplay.

In addition to Satan's Slaves, Anwar appeared in small acting roles in seven films between 2017 and 2018. This includes Galih & Ratna, My Generation, The Underdogs, Daysleepers, 27 Steps of May, and Ave Maryam, and the Malaysian crime thriller Fly by Night.

In 2018, it was announced that Anwar would helm the live-action adaptation of comic book superhero character Gundala. The film was released domestically in August 2019, launching the first phase of a superhero film series that will make up the BumiLangit Cinematic Universe along with other popular Indonesian comic book superhero characters. Internationally, it premiered at the Midnight Madness section of the 2019 Toronto International Film Festival. At the 2019 Citra Award, Gundala received 9 nominations and won 3 for cinematography, sound mixing, and visual effects. Earlier in January 2019, the comedy drama Orang Kaya Baru was released. Anwar wrote the screenplay for the film and received another Citra Award nomination for Best Original Screenplay.

In October 2019, Anwar released the folk horror Impetigore (Perempuan Tanah Jahanam) as his eighth feature film, becoming a critical and commercial success. At the 2020 Citra Award, Anwar won his second Citra Award for Best Director as well as a nomination in the Best Original Screenplay category. He also received another nomination in the Best Adapted Screenplay category for writing Kimo Stamboel's remake of Indonesian horror classic The Queen of Black Magic. Impetigore's 17 nominations broke the record for most nominations received by a film which was previously held by Mouly Surya's Marlina the Murderer in Four Acts with 14 nominations in 2018. Internationally, it premiered at the 2020 Sundance Film Festival to generally positive reviews. Josh Hurtado of Screen Anarchy praises Anwar for continuing "to carve out a niche for himself as one of the world's leading genre auteurs, going from strength to strength, he's got an incredibly impressive body of work already, and seems to only get better as he becomes more ambitious." In November 2020, Impetigore was announced as Indonesia's official submission for the 2021 Academy Awards.

=== 2020–present: Bumilangit Cinematic Universe and Satan's Slaves: Communion ===
Shortly after the release of Gundala, Anwar was announced as the executive producer to oversee the production of several films included in the planned Volume 1 of Bumilangit Cinematic Universe superhero franchise. The first of these films to follow Gundala will be the Upi Avianto-directed Sri Asih and Ody C. Harahap's Patriot Taruna: Virgo and the Sparklings which were originally slated for a 2020 release but were pushed back to 2021 due to the COVID-19 pandemic. A total of 8 films are planned for the Volume 1 series, all of which will receive treatment from Anwar as the creative producer.

In July 2020, Anwar teased his next project on Instagram by posting a collage of all his previous eight films with a ninth picture presumed to be hinting at his ninth feature, writing "My 9th movie. It's on. After 9 movies, probably a good time to start fresh." In June 2022, Anwar released the trailer for his upcoming feature Satan's Slaves 2: Communion, a sequel to 2017's Satan's Slaves. In April 2022, Anwar was announced to be directing an adaptation of Charles Beaumont's short story Fritzchen with a screenplay by Michael Voyer.

In August 2022, Satan's Slaves 2: Communion was released, surpassing one million admissions after only two days in theatre. It is currently the third highest-grossing Indonesian film of all time, with 6.3 million admissions. In September, Netflix announced that they were working on 7 original productions with Indonesian filmmakers, including Anwar who will helm a science-fiction thriller 7-episode limited series titled Nightmares and Daydreams. Frequent collaborators Ario Bayu and Marissa Anita are set to star in the series alongside Ruth Marini and Putri Ayudya. The following November, Sri Asih was released in theatre as the second entry to the Bumilangit Cinematic Universe, which Anwar wrote and produced.

In 2024, Joko Anwar's Nightmares and Daydreams, a seven-episode anthology series created by Anwar, was released on Netflix. The series combines elements of science fiction and horror, with all episodes set in Jakarta during various time periods.

Anwar's next directorial effort was Ghost in the Cell, a horror-comedy film about Indonesian prisoners surviving a supernatural being. It was released in Indonesia in April 2026.

== Personal life ==
Anwar actively interacts with his fans on social media, especially Twitter. In September 2009, he posted on his Twitter account that he would go into a convenience store fully naked if he gained 3,000 followers within the day. He ended up gaining over 13 thousand followers and fulfilled the promise, causing minor controversies.

== Filmography ==
=== Short film ===
Year	Title	Director	Writer
2003	Joni Be Brave	Yes	Yes
2004	Ajeng Ajeng	Yes	Yes
2012	Grave Torture	Yes	Yes
2012	Fresh to Move On	Yes	Yes
2012	Durable Love	Yes	Yes
2012	Suncatchers	Yes	Yes
2013	The New Found	Yes	Yes
2016	Jenny	Yes	Yes
2016	Don't Blink	Yes	Yes
2017	Jalanin Aja	Yes	Yes

=== Feature film ===
Year	Title	Director	Writer	Producer
2003	Arisan!	No	Yes	No
2005	Joni's Promise	Yes	Yes	No
2007	Jakarta Undercover	No	Yes	No
2007	Dead Time: Kala	Yes	Yes	No
2007	Quickie Express	No	Yes	No
2008	Fiksi.	No	Yes	No
2009	The Forbidden Door	Yes	Yes	No
2012	Ritual	Yes	Yes	No
2015	A Copy of My Mind	Yes	Yes	Executive
2017	Stip & Pensil	No	Yes	No
2017	Satan's Slaves	Yes	Yes	No
2019	Orang Kaya Baru	No	Yes	No
2019	Gundala	Yes	Yes	No
2019	Impetigore	Yes	Yes	No
2019	The Queen of Black Magic	No	Yes	No
2022	Satan's Slaves 2: Communion	Yes	Yes	No
2022	Sri Asih	No	Yes	Yes
2023	Virgo and the Sparklings	No	No	Yes
2024	Grave Torture	Yes	Yes	Executive
2025	The Siege at Thorn High	Yes	Yes	Yes
2025	Love Therapy	No	Yes	No
2025	Smothered	No	Yes	Yes
2026	Ghost in the Cell	Yes	Yes	No
TBA	Satan's Slaves 3	Yes	No	No
TBA	Gundala the Son of Lightning	Yes	No	No
TBA	Fritzchen	Yes	No	No

Acting credits

Year	Title	Role	Notes
2003	Arisan!	Restaurant Manager	
2006	Love for Share	Producer	
2008	Mereka Bilang, Saya Monyet!	Boss	
2008	Blind Pig Who Wants to Fly	Yahya	
2009	Macabre	Yuppie #3	
2010	Madame X	Aline	
2012	Parts of the Heart	Peter (age 35)	
2012	Missing	Neighbour	Short film
2013	Demi Ucok	Film Producer	
2013	3Sum	Cameo	
2014	Before the Morning After	Member of DPR	
2015	Nay	Pram	Voice
2015	Melancholy Is a Movement	Himself	
2016	Three Sassy Sisters	Taxi Driver	
2017	Galih & Ratna	Dedy	
2017	My Generation	Konji's Dad	
2017	The Underdogs	Ellie's Dad	
2017	Satan's Slaves	Dono Budiono	
2018	Fly by Night	Alan	
2018	Daysleepers	Tito	
2018	27 Steps of May	Opponent's Boxer Manager	
2018	Ave Maryam	Father Martin	
2022	Satan's Slaves 2: Communion	Bus Passenger	
2025	The Siege at Thorn High	Security Guards / News Coverage	

=== Television ===
Year	Title	Director	Writer	Executive Producer	Notes
2015–16	Halfworlds	Yes	Yes	No	Season 1
2018	Folklore	Yes	Yes	No	Episode "A Mother's Love"
2024	Joko Anwar's Nightmares and Daydreams	Yes	Yes	Yes	

== Frequent collaborators ==
Anwar has worked with several actors and actresses in multiple films, most notably is Arswendy Bening Swara who appeared in seven films and Tara Basro who appeared in five of his films as lead consecutively between A Copy of My Mind in 2015 and Satan's Slaves 2: Communion in 2022.

Actors	Joni's Promise	Dead Time: Kala	The Forbidden Door	Ritual	A Copy of My Mind	Satan's Slaves	Gundala	Impetigore	Satan's Slaves 2: Communion	Grave Torture	The Siege at Thorn High	Ghost in the Cell	Total
Aming Sugandhi	Yes						Yes					Yes	3
Ario Bayu		Yes	Yes		Yes		Yes	Yes					5
Arswendy Bening Swara		Yes	Yes			Yes	Yes	Yes		Yes		Yes	7
Asmara Abigail						Yes	Yes	Yes	Yes				4
Bront Palarae						Yes	Yes		Yes			Yes	4
Egy Fedly						Yes			Yes	Yes			3
Endy Arfian						Yes			Yes		Yes	Yes	4
Fachri Albar		Yes	Yes			Yes			Yes	Yes			5
Kiki Narendra							Yes	Yes	Yes		Yes	Yes	5
Lukman Sardi	Yes						Yes					Yes	3
Marissa Anita				Yes			Yes	Yes				Yes	4
Muzakki Ramdhan							Yes		Yes	Yes			3
Rio Dewanto			Yes	Yes			Yes					Yes	4
Sujiwo Tejo	Yes	Yes					Yes						3
Tara Basro					Yes	Yes	Yes	Yes	Yes				5
