= A Copy of My Mind =

2015 Indonesian film

- Film poster
- Directed by: Joko Anwar
- Written by: Joko Anwar
- Produced by: Tia Hasibuan; Uwie Balfas; Jeong Tae-sung
- Starring: Tara Basro; Chicco Jerikho
- Cinematography: Ical Tanjung
- Edited by: Arifin Cu'unk
- Music by: Rooftop Sound
- Production companies: CJ Entertainment; Lo-Fi Flicks; Prodigihouse
- Distributed by: CJ Entertainment
- Release dates: 3 September 2015 (Venice); 11 February 2016 (Indonesia)
- Running time: 116 minutes
- Country: Indonesia
- Language: Indonesian
- Budget: Rp 250 million

A Copy of My Mind is a 2015 Indonesian drama film written and directed by Joko Anwar. A low-budget co-production between Indonesia and South Korea, the film stars Tara Basro and Chicco Jerikho. At the 35th Citra Awards, the film received seven nominations, winning three: Best Director for Anwar, Best Actress for Basro, and Best Sound.

== Plot ==
A young woman who works at a cheap beauty salon in Jakarta meets a man who makes a living by doing subtitles for pirated DVDs. They quickly fall in love. But their romance is threatened to meet a tragic end as the political situation in the country is heating up during the presidential election. And the ones who suffer are usually common people.

== Cast ==
- Tara Basro as Sari
- Chicco Jerikho as Alek
- Maera Panigoro as Mirna
- Paul Agusta as Bandi, a salon manager
- Ario Bayu as a hitman
- Ronny P. Tjandra as Ronny
- Tony Merle as DVD seller
- Suhaya as presidential candidate
- Windu Arifin as pirated DVD agents
- Ang Tjio Yang as Sari's landlady
- Sutirah as Alek's landlady

== Production ==
=== Development ===
Due to lack of funding, Anwar shopped the film's script to the Asian Project Market at the Busan International Film Festival in 2014, where it won the CJ Entertainment Award and a US$10,000 grant. The grant, coupled with a Rp 100 million loans from Anwar's friends, made up the film's Rp 250 million production budget.

Due to budget restrictions, the film's cast and crew did not get paid until the film started generating revenue once it was released. Tara Basro commented that she was willing to star in the film despite the uncertainty with salary because "Joko [Anwar] asked me to". Music composer Tony Merle, credited as Tony Setiaji, appeared in the film as a DVD seller.

=== Filming ===
To save money, the shooting only took 10 days to complete with 100 crew members. Anwar said in an interview with Coconuts Media that "The preparation took eight months. The shoot was brief, only eight days. But we deliberately made it brief because we didn’t want to film in sets. It [was filmed in] real locations, involving real people."

== Release ==
The film had its world premiere at the Horizons section of the 72nd Venice International Film Festival, where it was the only Southeast Asian film to make the official selection. After further screenings at the Toronto International Film Festival, Busan International Film Festival, and International Film Festival Rotterdam, the film was released theatrically in Indonesia on 11 February 2016.

According to Anwar, a censored version of the film was used for theatrical release in Indonesia due to the depiction of sex scenes and explicit language. The uncut version was shown at international film festivals.

== Reception ==
=== Box office ===
As of 20 February 2016, the film had garnered 30 thousand admissions domestically.

=== Critical response ===
Reviewing the film following its screening in Venice, Craig Takeuchi of The Georgia Straight praised wrote "Like the meandering, observant nature of the film, the point of this story is more about exploring what happens when you lose your way, rather than simply getting to where you want to go."

Jason Bechervaise of Screen Daily praised Anwar's for "focus[ing] on characters and the strong chemistry between his two leads as he maintains a steady pace", further commenting that the film "is technically accomplished, paying careful if understated attention to the surroundings." Bechervaise also singled out Basro and Jerikho for "help[ing] carry the film with their carefully calculated performances" and their "genuine and natural abilities [to] help give the film more than a touch of authenticity and sincerity."

Upon its theatrical release, Adinda Zakiah of Cinema Poetica praised the film for being a "genuine and simple, but beautiful film" while noting Anwar's ability to write characters that "do not fall into the dichotomy of good and bad". Similarly, Endro Priherdityo of CNN Indonesia highlighted Anwar's ability to "depict the dark corners of Indonesia honestly and brilliantly" in reference to the film's political and class divide themes.

== Awards and nominations ==
Year	Award	Category	Recipient	Result	Ref.
2015	72nd Venice International Film Festival	Horizons Best Film	A Copy of My Mind	Nominated	
2015	35th Citra Awards	Best Picture	A Copy of My Mind	Nominated	
2015	35th Citra Awards	Best Director	Joko Anwar	Won	
2015	35th Citra Awards	Best Actress	Tara Basro	Nominated	
2015	35th Citra Awards	Best Supporting Actor	Paul Agusta	Nominated	
2015	35th Citra Awards	Best Cinematography	Ical Tanjung	Nominated	
2015	35th Citra Awards	Best Sound	Khikmawan Santosa; Yusuf A. Patawari	Won	
2015	35th Citra Awards	Best Original Score	Rooftop Sound	Nominated	
2016	5th Maya Awards	Best Feature Film	A Copy of My Mind	Nominated	
2016	5th Maya Awards	Best Director	Joko Anwar	Nominated	
2016	5th Maya Awards	Best Actor in a Leading Role	Chicco Jerikho	Nominated	
2016	5th Maya Awards	Best Original Screenplay	Joko Anwar	Nominated	
2016	5th Maya Awards	Best Editing	Arifin Cu'unk	Nominated	
2016	5th Maya Awards	Best Cinematography	Ical Tanjung	Nominated	
2016	5th Maya Awards	Best Art Direction	Windu Arifin	Nominated	
2016	5th Maya Awards	Best Sound	Khikmawan Santosa; Yusuf A. Patawari	Won	
2016	5th Maya Awards	Best Poster Design	A Copy of My Mind	Won	
2016	Indonesian Movie Awards	Best Actress	Tara Basro	Nominated	
2016	Indonesian Movie Awards	Best Supporting Actor	Paul Agusta	Nominated	
2016	Indonesian Movie Awards	Best Chemistry	Chicco Jerikho; Tara Basro	Nominated	
2016	Indonesian Movie Awards	Favorite Film	A Copy of My Mind	Nominated	
2016	Indonesian Movie Awards	Favorite Actress	Tara Basro	Nominated	
2016	Indonesian Movie Awards	Favorite Supporting Actor	Paul Agusta	Nominated	

== Sequels ==
Prior to the film's release, Anwar announced that he envisioned the film to be the first in a trilogy series. While no further confirmation has been made, Anwar hinted that the second and third films are called A Copy of My Soul and A Copy of My Heart and will tell different stories with different cast members.
