= Satan's Slaves =

2017 Indonesian horror film

- Theatrical release poster
- Pengabdi Setan
- Directed by: Joko Anwar
- Screenplay by: Joko Anwar
- Based on: Satan's Slave (1980); Story by Subagio S.
- Produced by: Gope T. Samtani; Sunil Samtani; Priya N. K.
- Starring: Tara Basro; Bront Palarae; Ayu Laksmi; Endy Arfian; Nasar Anuz; Muhammad Adhiyat
- Cinematography: Ical Tanjung
- Edited by: Arifin Cu'unk
- Music by: Bemby Gusti; Tony Merle; Aghi Narottama
- Production companies: Rapi Films; CJ Entertainment
- Distributed by: RLJE Films
- Release date: 20 September 2017
- Running time: 107 minutes
- Country: Indonesia
- Language: Indonesian
- Budget: Rp 2 billion ($150,000)
- Box office: $16.2 million

Satan's Slaves (Indonesian: Pengabdi Setan) is a 2017 Indonesian supernatural horror film written and directed by Joko Anwar. It is a loose remake-prequel to the 1980 film of the same name directed by Sisworo Gautama Putra based on a story by Subagio S. The plot follows a family who are haunted by the death of their mother, who dies after being bedridden for three years from a strange and debilitating illness.

Satan's Slaves was the highest-grossing Indonesian film of 2017 with 4.2 million admissions. It was released in 42 countries including Malaysia, Singapore, Japan, Germany, and the United States. A sequel, Satan's Slaves 2: Communion, was released in August 2022.

== Plot ==
The film centres on a struggling family living in the countryside in 1981: Mawarni, her husband Bahri, his mother Rahma, and the couple’s four children—22-year-old Rini, 16-year-old Toni, 10-year-old Bondi, and six-year-old Ian, who is deaf. The family live in financial hardship, as Mawarni is ill and bedridden, and the royalties from her former singing career have long since run out.

After Mawarni dies, the family are consoled by an ustad and his adult son, Hendra, who has recently moved to the neighbourhood. Bahri leaves for town to raise money for mortgage payments. At home, the children are haunted by an ghostly presence resembling Mawarni. Bondi and Rini later discover their grandmother Rahma dead inside the well. After finding an unsent letter on Rahma’s desk addressed to a man named Budiman, Rini and Hendra deliver it to him in town to seek his help. Budiman, an occult writer, reveals that when Bahri intended to marry Mawarni, Rahma disapproved due to Mawarni’s career and indications of infertility. He gives Rini an article he has written about a fertility cult of Satan worshippers that target barren women who wish to have children, on the condition that the last child be willingly surrendered after seven years. Fearing for Ian’s safety, as he will turn seven in three days, they grow increasingly alarmed. The following day, while delivering an urgent letter from Budiman to Rini, Hendra is run over by a lorry.

Bahri decides to move with his children to town. That night, members of the cult surround the house as a storm rages; however, after Bahri declares that he will not give up Ian, they leave. The moving van fails to arrive the next day, forcing the family to remain for another night, with the ustad keeping watch. Rini finally opens Budiman’s letter, which explains that the last child will be taken by the cult because they are Satan’s own offspring. It also reveals that the cultists’ visit the previous night was merely to mark the house for the undead, who will come to collect the child. Mawarni and several pocong appear, including Hendra, and kill the ustad. Ian, having just turned seven, cheerfully joins Mawarni and the pocong. Budiman arrives and evacuates Bahri and the remaining children.

One year later, Bahri and his family are living in a town apartment. A woman named Darminah visits, bringing food, and later reports to her husband, who insists that they must ensure the family never leave. Darminah remarks that it is “time for another harvest”, and her husband tells her to be patient.

== Cast ==
- Tara Basro as Rini, Bahri's and Mawarni's 22-year-old daughter as well as sister to Toni, Bondi, and Ian
- Bront Palarae as Bahri Suwono, father to Rini, Toni, and Bondi as well as husband to Mawarni
- Ayu Laksmi as Mawarni Suwono, mother to Rini, Toni, Bondi, and Ian as well as wife to Bahri
- Endy Arfian as Toni, Bahri's and Mawarni's 16-year-old son as well as brother to Rini, Bondi, and Ian
- Nasar Anuz as Bondi, Bahri's and Mawarni's 10-year-old son as well as brother to Rini, Toni, and Ian
- Muhammad Adhiyat as Ian, Bahri's and Mawarni's deaf 6-year-old son as well as brother to Rini, Toni, and Bondi
- Elly D. Luthan as Rahma Saidah, Rini's grandmother
- Arswendi Nasution as the ustad
- Dimas Aditya as Hendra, the ustad's son
- Egi Fedly as Budiman
- Fachri Albar as Batara
- Asmara Abigail as Darminah

== Production ==
=== Development ===
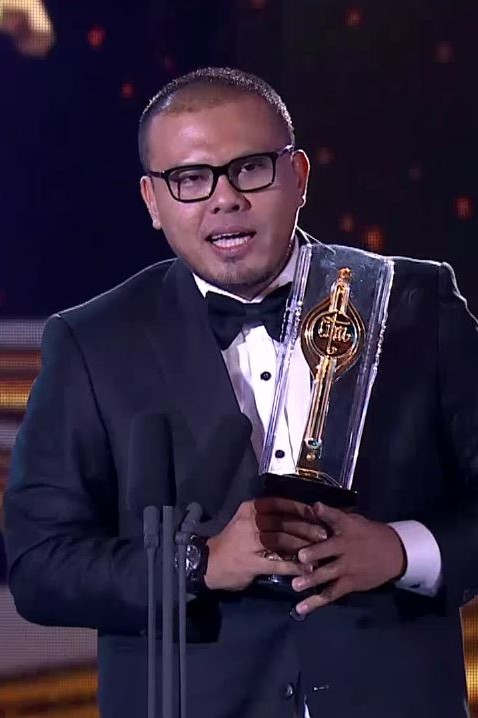
Joko Anwar had wanted to remake Pengabdi Setan right from the start of his filmmaking career.

Director Joko Anwar had wanted to direct a remake of Pengabdi Setan ever since starting his filmmaking career, as the film had moved him to become one. Rapi Films already had a remake of the film in the works with a different director attached, but Anwar managed to successfully pitch his own vision for the film to producer Sunil Samtani and was attached to the project soon after. Samtani granted the film a budget exceeding Rp 2 billion, far more than the average films produced by Rapi, in order to fully realize director Anwar's vision for production design.

=== Filming ===
The production team took four months to search for a filming location to accurately represent the 1980's era in which the film takes place. The original filming location was located in Puncak Bogor, West Java, but the owner did not give them the proper permissions to film there. The team continued searching until they found an old house in the Pangalengan area which they redesigned to fit the aesthetic of the era.

== Music ==
Pengabdi Setan Original Soundtrack

Soundtrack album by Various artists
- Released: 2017
- Genre: Soundtrack
- Label: Music Kickup

Singles from Pengabdi Setan Original Soundtrack
- 1. "Kelam Malam" Released: October 19, 2017; 2. "Karma" Released: October 19, 2017; 3. "Kelam Malam (Vinyl Version)" Released: October 19, 2017

The film soundtrack is directed by Aghi Narottama, Tony Merle, and Bemby Gusti. Director Joko Anwar said that there are at least five songs that will be on the album plus 16 others so there will be a total of 21 tracks. Three of them were released on October 19, 2017, on Spotify and iTunes.

Pengabdi Setan (Original Soundtrack)
No.	Title	Lyrics	Music	Performer	Length
1.	"Kelam Malam" (Dark Night)	Joko Anwar	Tony Merle	The Spouse	2:42
2.	"Karma"	Anwar	The Spouse	The Spouse	3:46
3.	"Kelam Malam" (Vinyl Version)	Anwar	Merle	The Spouse	2:42
4.	"Serenade"	Bemby Gusti	Gusti	The Spouse
5.	"Mala Pujaan Hatiku" (My Darling Mala)	Gusti	Gusti	Anwar
6.	"Di Wajahmu Kulihat Bulan" (I See the Moon on Your Face; originally by Sam Saimun)	Sam Saimun	Gusti	The Spouse	3:10

== Release ==
Satan's Slaves premiered in Indonesia at the Epicentrum XXI, Kuningan, South Jakarta on September 20, 2017. The film was released in all Indonesian cinemas on September 28, 2017, and in Malaysia and Singapore on November 23, 2017. The film also to be released in 42 countries.

== Reception ==
=== Box office ===
As of the end of 2017, Satan's Slaves has grossed Rp155 billion ($11.5 million) in Indonesia, and RM6 million ($1.5 million) in neighboring Malaysia, the latter country giving it its place as the highest grossing Indonesian film of all time beating Ada Apa Dengan Cinta? 2's record collective gross of RM4.6 million in 2016. In Mexico, it was released as Los Huerfanos and ranked at 6th place on Mexico Box Office on March 2–4, 2018; grossing $233,763 on its first weekend. As of September 2, 2018, it grossed $147,962 in Colombia. On April 3, 2018, it opened at No. 1 in Hong Kong. Back in its home country in Indonesia, Satan's Slaves became the best-selling Indonesian film of 2017 as well as the best-selling Indonesian horror and fourth best-selling Indonesian film of all time.

=== Critical response ===
On review aggregator Rotten Tomatoes, the film holds a 90% approval rating based on 21 reviews, with an average rating of 6.80/10.

John Lui of The Straits Times gave Pengabdi Setan 3.5 stars out of 5 and wrote that "the scares are carefully timed and spaced between plenty of character-building moments, showing the closeness of the family. These soap opera bits have aged the least well, but there is a low-key feel to these moments of filial piety that is thoroughly modern." Variety's Richard Kuipers wrote that the film has "high marks when it comes to the fundamental horror movie task of sending shivers up the spine and quickening the pulse." James Marsh of the South China Morning Post gave the film 3/5 stars, saying "a slow-burning tale that builds to a chaotic and somewhat muddled conclusion, Satan’s Slaves is bursting with ideas." Jonathan Barkan of Dread Central gave the film 3.5 stars out of 5, writing "without a doubt, Satan's Slaves is certainly creepy. This Indonesian occult horror remake gets it right". Writing for SciFiNow, Anton Bitel gave the film 4 out of 5 stars, saying "Mirrorings, repetitions and doppelgängers are fitting images for a film that is itself a reprise (with considerable variations) of Sisworo Gautama Putra’s 1980 film of the same name—the very film that inspired Anwar to become a writer/director of genre films." Karina Adelgaard of Heaven of Horror gave it a top rating of 5 out of 5 when screening it during Fantasia 2018. Later, Heaven of Horror also included the movie in their list of the best horror movies from the 2010s.

== Awards and nominations ==
Year	Award	Category	Recipient(s)/Nominee(s)	Result
2017	37th Citra Awards	Best Film	Satan's Slaves	Nominated
2017	37th Citra Awards	Best Director	Joko Anwar	Nominated
2017	37th Citra Awards	Best Adapted Screenplay	Joko Anwar	Nominated
2017	37th Citra Awards	Best Cinematography	Ical Tanjung	Won
2017	37th Citra Awards	Best Film Editing	Arifin Cu'unk	Nominated
2017	37th Citra Awards	Best Art Direction	Allan Sebastian	Won
2017	37th Citra Awards	Best Visual Effects	Heri Kuntoro; Abby Eldipie	Won
2017	37th Citra Awards	Best Makeup	Darwyn Tse	Nominated
2017	37th Citra Awards	Best Costume Design	Isabelle Patrice	Nominated
2017	37th Citra Awards	Best Sound	Khikmawan Santosa; Anhar Moha	Won
2017	37th Citra Awards	Best Original Score	Aghi Narottama; Tony Merle; Bemby Gusti	Won
2017	37th Citra Awards	Best Theme Song	"Kelam Malam" by The Spouse	Won
2017	37th Citra Awards	Best Child Actor	Muhammad Adhiyat	Won
2017	1st Tempo Film Festival	Best Picture	Satan's Slaves	Nominated
2017	1st Tempo Film Festival	Best Director	Joko Anwar	Nominated
2017	1st Tempo Film Festival	Best Actress	Tara Basro	Nominated
2017	1st Tempo Film Festival	Best Supporting Actor	Bront Palarae	Nominated
2017	1st Tempo Film Festival	Best Supporting Actress	Ayu Laksmi	Won
2017	1st Tempo Film Festival	Best Screenplay	Joko Anwar	Nominated
2017	1st Tempo Film Festival	Best Child Performer	Muhammad Adhiyat	Won
2017	1st Tempo Film Festival	Best Child Performer	Nasar Anuz	Nominated
2017	6th Maya Awards	Best Feature Film	Satan's Slaves	Nominated
2017	6th Maya Awards	Best Director	Joko Anwar	Won
2017	6th Maya Awards	Best Adapted Screenplay	Satan's Slaves	Nominated
2017	6th Maya Awards	Best Actress in a Supporting Role	Ayu Laksmi	Nominated
2017	6th Maya Awards	Best Cinematography	Ical Tanjung	Nominated
2017	6th Maya Awards	Best Editing	Arifin Cu'unk	Won
2017	6th Maya Awards	Best Art Direction	Allan Sebastian	Nominated
2017	6th Maya Awards	Best Special Effects	Finalize Studios	Nominated
2017	6th Maya Awards	Best Makeup & Hairstyling	Darwyn Tse	Nominated
2017	6th Maya Awards	Best Costume Design	Isabelle Patrice	Nominated
2017	6th Maya Awards	Best Sound Design	Anhar Moha; Khikmawan Santosa	Won
2017	6th Maya Awards	Best Film Score	Aghi Narottama; Tony Merle; Bemby Gusti	Nominated
2017	6th Maya Awards	Best Theme Song	"Kelam Malam" by The Spouse	Won
2017	6th Maya Awards	Best Young Performer	Muhammad Adhiyat	Won
2017	6th Maya Awards	Best Young Performer	Nasar Anuz	Nominated
2017	6th Maya Awards	Arifin C. Noer Award for Memorable Brief Appearance	Joko Anwar	Nominated
2018	Indonesian Box Office Movie Awards	Best Box Office Movie	Satan's Slaves	Won
2018	Indonesian Box Office Movie Awards	Best Director	Joko Anwar	Won
2018	Indonesian Box Office Movie Awards	Best Screenwriter	Joko Anwar	Nominated
2018	Indonesian Box Office Movie Awards	Best Actor in a Leading Role	Bront Palarae	Nominated
2018	Indonesian Box Office Movie Awards	Best Actor in a Supporting Role	Endy Arfian	Nominated
2018	Indonesian Box Office Movie Awards	Best Actress in a Supporting Role	Ayu Laksmi	Won
2018	Indonesian Box Office Movie Awards	Best Newcomer	Muhammad Adhiyat	Won
2018	Indonesian Box Office Movie Awards	Best Movie Poster	Satan's Slaves	Nominated
2018	Indonesian Box Office Movie Awards	Best Movie Trailer	Satan's Slaves	Won
2018	Indonesian Box Office Movie Awards	Best Original Soundtrack	"Kelam Malam" by The Spouse	Won
2018	Indonesian Box Office Movie Awards	Box Office Movie of the Year	Satan's Slaves	Won
2018	Indonesian Box Office Movie Awards	Top 10 Box Office Movie of 2017	Satan's Slaves	Won
2018	Overlook Film Festival	Feature Film Jury Prize	Satan's Slaves	Won
2018	Cinepocalypse	Best Director	Joko Anwar	Won
2018	Popcorn Frights Film Festival	Jury Prize for Scariest Film	Satan's Slaves	Won
2018	Toronto After Dark Film Festival	Best Horror Film	Satan's Slaves	Won
2018	Toronto After Dark Film Festival	Most Scary Film	Satan's Slaves	Won

== Sequel ==
In a 9 October 2017 interview with The Jakarta Post, director Anwar revealed that the film was a prequel to the original and that a sequel was planned, with the original film now being the third part in a trilogy. On 18 December 2017, executive producer Sunil Samtani said Rapi Films has been discussing the project plan of the sequel of Pengabdi Setan. The film is planned for release in 2019 and Joko Anwar will still be involved. On 23 March 2018, Samtani revealed that they had not come up with a script yet but filming would commence in 2019. He added that the stars of the existing film had expressed their interest but it's up to Anwar to decide on the actors.

The first trailer for the sequel, titled Satan's Slaves: Communion, was released in February 2022, and the second trailer on June 16 the same year. The film was released theatrically on August 4, 2022.

== See also ==
- List of films featuring the deaf and hard of hearing
- Indonesian horror
