= Sabrina (2018 film) =

- Theatrical release poster
- Directed by: Rocky Soraya
- Written by: Riheam Junianti; Fajar Umbara
- Produced by: Rocky Soraya
- Starring: Luna Maya; Christian Sugiono; Sara Wijayanto
- Cinematography: Asep Kalila
- Edited by: Sastha Sunu; Rifqy Pramesworo
- Music by: Stevesmith Music Production
- Production company: Hitmaker Studios
- Distributed by: Netflix
- Release date: July 12, 2018
- Running time: 114 Minutes
- Country: Indonesia
- Language: Indonesian

Sabrina is a 2018 Indonesian horror film directed by Rocky Soraya and written by Riheam Junianti and Fajar Umbara.

== Plot ==
Vanya, who recently lost her mother Andini, struggles to adapt to living with uncle Aiden Kev and aunt Maira.

Aiden, who works in a toy manufacturing company, acquires the rights to a trending doll named Sabrina, and creates a unique version just for Vanya. Maira gifts it to Vanya for her birthday, which cheers her up a little.

At school, Vanya's classmate Ditho gives her a Charlie Charlie game, which she uses to communicate with her deceased mother. At the end of the session, one is supposed to say goodbye to Charlie and pray, to ensure the spiritual door is closed and the invited spirits can go back to heaven correctly. Vanya forgets to do this, causing the lingering spirit to possess Sabrina.

As Vanya shows more interest in the paranormal, Aiden and Maira take her on a holiday to take her mind off it. During the vacation, Aiden and Maira start to see Andini, and realize something is wrong. After the vacation, the couple travel to Bandung and meet demonologists Laras and Bagas, hiring them to return Andini's spirit to heaven.

Vanya is brought to her nanny as they perform a ritual. Andini possesses Vanya and stabs the nanny. They then carry out an exorcism on Vanya, enabling a sequence of possessions. It concludes with the reveal that the spirit isn't always Andini, but Baghiah, a demon that seeks a human host to perform ritual killings, using loved ones as bait.

Everyone escapes, and Laras locks the door, but Baghiah quickly escapes the house. With a new method, they carry out a ritual on the residence. Baghiah reminds Laras of a ritual she and Bagas performed years ago on Baghiah, who traumatized Aiden. Aiden broke the rule of not entering the ritual room until the ritual is completed.

It is revealed that Aiden's father bequeathed 40% of Kev Toys to Aiden, with 60% to his brother. Fueled by jealousy, Aiden visited a shaman and asked the shaman to kill his brother. The brother is killed, however, the price of Aiden's jealously was great; Andini life is lost. As Baghiah vanishes and Aiden's crimes revealed, Aiden is arrested.

Upon Andini's spirit's request, Vanya christens Maira her mom. Meanwhile, Laras and Bagas receive a request to solve another case.

== Cast ==
- Luna Maya as Maira Kev, Aiden's wife and Vanya's aunt
- Christian Sugiono as Aiden Kev, Maira's husband and Vanya's uncle
- Sara Wijayanto as Laras, Raynard's wife and the psychic who help Maira
- Jeremy Thomas as Raynard, Laras' husband and the psychic who help Maira
- Rizky Hanggono as Arka Kev, Aiden's elder brother, Andini's husband, Vanya's deceased father
- Richelle Georgette Skornicki as Vanya Kev, Arka and Andini's daughter, Aiden and Maira's niece
- Asri Handayani as Andini Kev, Arka's wife and Vanya's deceased mother
- Demian Aditya as Dedi, Laras' deceased husband
- Sahil Shah as Baghiah, the demon who possessed Sabrina the doll
- Imelda as Bi Nur, Aiden's servant and Vanya's nanny
- Habibie Alatas as Dukun, the shaman who summons demon Baghiah
- Adlu Fahrezi as Ditho, Vanya's schoolmate
- Vidya Ully as Aiden and Arka's Mother, Vanya's deceased grandmother
- Felix William Smitts as Bramantyo Kev, Aiden and Arka's Father, Vanya's deceased grandfather
- Yasmine Mahya as Valerie, Vanya's schoolmate
