= The Forbidden Door (film) =

2009 Indonesian psychological thriller film

- Film poster
- Pintu Terlarang
- Directed by: Joko Anwar
- Written by: Joko Anwar
- Based on: Pintu Terlarang by Sekar Ayu Asmara
- Produced by: Sheila Timothy
- Starring: Fachri Albar; Marsha Timothy; Ario Bayu; Otto Djauhari
- Cinematography: Ipung Rachmat Syaiful
- Edited by: Wawan I. Wibowo
- Music by: Aghi Narottama; Bembi Gusti; Mondo Gascaro; Zeke Khaseli
- Production company: Lifelike Pictures
- Distributed by: Lifelike Pictures
- Release date: January 22, 2009 (Indonesia)
- Running time: 115 minutes
- Country: Indonesia
- Language: Indonesian
- Budget: Rp 2 billion

The Forbidden Door (Indonesian: Pintu Terlarang) is a 2009 Indonesian psychological thriller film written and directed by Joko Anwar based on Sekar Ayu Asmara's novel of the same name. Despite disappointing box office receipts in Indonesia, the film won rave reviews internationally, with The Hollywood Reporter calling it a film that "would make [Alfred] Hitchcock and [Pedro] Almodóvar proud."

== Plot ==
Gambir, a lifecasting sculptor of pregnant women, extramaritally impregnates Talyda Sasongko. At the abortion clinic, a man tells him that when his wife had abortion here, they were haunted with guilt, though gradually adapted as they aborted every single fetus they had. Gambir, overcome with emotion, cuts the belly part of one of his sculptures and puts the fetus, named Arjasa, in it, so it would appear "living". They later marry and his career rises (Arjasa's sculpture being the most acclaimed work), but he is still haunted and becomes dispirited, often causing division between him and Talyda. He also suffers erectile dysfunction as a result. When Gambir reveals to Jimmy, owner of an art gallery, that he wants to change his sculpting motif, he is threatened not to do so, or Arjasa's sculpture will be revealed and he and Talyda will face criminal charges.

One day, Gambir notices in his house a locked door; Talyda tells him only she can enter the door, warning that if he opens it, an energy of melancholy will consume Talyda and ruin their marriage. Gambir discovers that he has been getting messages written in various places stating "help me" and "Herosase". Noticing his friend Dandung exiting the Herosase building, he asks; Dandung tells him it is not for the faint-hearted and makes him a member. Gambir is told that the only rule in Herosase is to never ask. Gambir is made watching videos depicting rape, suicide, and a boy being violently abused by his parents. Dandung tells him the cameras were placed by Herosase Inc. without the knowledge of others, and says nothing can be done toward the victims. The next day, Dandung claims the boy died with his mother, leaving Gambir devastated with guilt.

At his sculpture exhibition, Gambir hears a talk among several members of Herosase, where a man speculates the boy's parents have been paid, and that he saw a video depicting the mother drowning him, convinced that soon the boy will die. Gambir goes to Herosase and watches as the bloody boy takes a chef's knife and gleefully performs familicide. At the channels menu, Gambir learns that his house has also been watched, and sees Talyda having sex with Dandung and his friend Rio upon his mother's suggestion, as well as telling Jimmy to fake his praise towards Gambir and his works, mentioning Arjasa's sculpture. For Christmas, Gambir arranges a dinner with Talyda, Dandung, Rio, his mother, and Jimmy. He infuses their red wines with a poison named devilish pit, causing 10 minutes of paralysis, and uses that time to kill them.

Gambir sees the locked door covered with a painting of an eye. After throwing it, he barges in and learns that the door is the house of the boy in the video. Upon seeing his mother, who bears resemblance with Gambir's mother, he has an epiphany that everything he went through is his imagination. The boy represents Gambir's youth, except before he was able to decapitate himself police barged in the house. He was admitted to a mental hospital named Herosase, where he forms a humane alter ego of himself. The sculptor idea comes from a journalist named Ranti who gave him books and magazines as influences on his imagination. Gambir fancied Ranti and imagined her as his wife named Talyda. Other characters are in reality hospital staff. He then imagines being a Catholic pastor assisting a man who went through the same thing he did in his imagination; he advises the man not to open his philosophical door of chaos which he dubs "the forbidden door".

== Cast ==
- Fachri Albar as Gambir
- Marsha Timothy as Talyda/Ranti
- Ario Bayu as Dandung
- Otto Djauhari as Rio
- Tio Pakusadewo as Koh Jimmy
- Henidar Amroe as Menik Sasongko
- Arswendi Nasution as the man at abortion clinic
- Atiqah Hasiholan as Claudia/Receptionist
- Rio Dewanto as the man at church
- Verdi Solaiman as John Wongso
- James Awuy as mysterious little boy
- Putri Sukardi as Mom
- Ade Firza Paloh as Dad
- Kartika Jahja as Mona

Directors Timo Tjahjanto and Kimo Stamboel, collectively known as The Mo Brothers, made cameo appearances as patrons of the art gallery Herosase while costume designer Isabelle Patrice appeared briefly as a doctor at the abortion clinic.

== Production ==
The film is Anwar's third feature releases following 2005's Joni's Promise and 2007's Dead Time: Kala. According to Anwar, while the story is based on an existing material, he added elements of his own into the screenplay by touching on his personal disdain of people who conceive children to conform to society's expectations without any real plans.

== Soundtrack ==
The Forbidden Door (soundtrack)

Soundtrack album by Various Artists
- Released: 2009
- Genres: Pop, rock, jazz

The film's original soundtrack consists of 18 tracks divided into two parts: part one consisting of songs performed by various bands and part two consisting of the film's score composed by Aghi Narottama, Bembi Gusti, Mondo Gascaro, and Zeke Khaseli.

=== Part One ===
| No. | Title | Artist(s) | Length |
|---|---|---|---|
| 1. | "Why" | Mantra |
| 2. | "Nancy Bird" | Sore |
| 3. | "Please Operator Please" | Mantra |
| 4. | "Home Safe" | Tika and The Dissidents |
| 5. | "Baby Baby" | Mantra |
| 6. | "Jiro" | Notturno |
| 7. | "Blessed the Tainted Heart" | Mantra |
| 8. | "Lullaby Blues" | Sore featuring Tilly of The Checkins |
| 9. | "Merry Mist" | Alfred Ayal |

=== Part Two ===
| No. | Title | Length |
|---|---|---|
| 1. | "Opening Tune" |
| 2. | "The Color Purple" |
| 3. | "Innocent Blood" |
| 4. | "Dirty Work" |
| 5. | "Naked Truth" |
| 6. | "Blood Opus" |
| 7. | "Chasing the Kid" |
| 8. | "The Eye" |
| 9. | "Pig-Headed Hero" |

== Release ==
The film was released on January 22, 2009 in Indonesia followed by screenings at several international film festivals, including the International Film Festival Rotterdam, Toronto After Dark Film Festival, Sitges Film Festival, Vancouver International Film Festival, BFI London Film Festival, and Jakarta International Film Festival.

== Reception ==
The Forbidden Door received widespread acclaim from critics.

Calling it a film that would make "would make [Alfred] Hitchcock and [Pedro] Almodóvar proud", Maggie Lee of The Hollywood Reporter named The Forbidden Door "the most polished genre film of its kind in recent Indonesian cinema". The New York Asian Film Festival's website described the film as a "19th century gothic novel adapted by Alfred Hitchcock and directed by David Lynch", calling it "one of the sickest, kinkiest movies".

John Leal of Bloody Disgusting rated the film 8 out of 10 and wrote that the film "is a highly recommended Indonesian effort whose storyline gives us a very unique experience that comes well written and with plenty of horror to offset and in fact complement the drama. Anwar’s direction is equally amazing, giving us a full-frontal approach to the well-executed horror sequences that set this film apart from most of what I have seen in recent time."

Similarly, Twitch Film's Ard Vijn also praised the film, noting that "Anwar wants to keep his movies accessible for the general public while telling them an outrageous story at the same time, and like with Kala it's amazing how well he succeeds. He also noted that the 4 out of 5 stars audience rating the film received during its screening at the International Film Festival Rotterdam indicates that "maybe people are used to a lot more gore than I expected."

== Awards and nominations ==
| Year | Award | Category | Recipient | Result |
|---|---|---|---|---|
| 2009 | Bangkok International Film Festival | Golden Kinnaree Award | Joko Anwar | Nominated |
| 2009 | 29th Citra Awards | Best Adapted Screenplay | Joko Anwar | Nominated |
| 2009 | 29th Citra Awards | Best Editing | Wawan I. Wibowo | Won |
| 2009 | 29th Citra Awards | Best Cinematography | Ipung Rachmat Syaiful | Won |
| 2009 | Bucheon International Fantastic Film Festival | Best of Bucheon | Joko Anwar | Won |
| 2010 | KasKus untuk Film Indonesia | Best Film | The Forbidden Door | Won |
| 2010 | KasKus untuk Film Indonesia | Best Director | Joko Anwar | Won |
| 2010 | KasKus untuk Film Indonesia | Best Actor | Fachri Albar | Won |
| 2010 | KasKus untuk Film Indonesia | Best Screenplay | Joko Anwar | Won |
