= Ritual (2012 film) =

2012 Indonesian horror-thriller film

- Modus Anomali
- Directed by: Joko Anwar
- Written by: Joko Anwar
- Produced by: Gadin Fajriani; Tia Hasibuan; Sheila Timothy; Luki Wanandi
- Starring: Rio Dewanto; Hannah Al Rashid; Izzi Isman; Aridh Tritama; Sadha Triyudha; Jose Gamo; Marsha Timothy; Surya Saputra
- Cinematography: Gunnar Nimpuno
- Edited by: Arifin Cuunk
- Music by: Bembi Gusti; Aghi Narottama; Gascaro Ramondo
- Distributed by: Lifelike Pictures
- Release date: April 26, 2012
- Country: Indonesia
- Language: English

Ritual (Indonesian: Modus Anomali) is a 2012 Indonesian psychological thriller film written and directed by Joko Anwar. It stars Rio Dewanto in the lead role and is Anwar's first English-language film. According to Anwar, he made the film in English to indicate that it does not take place in Indonesia.

== Synopsis ==
The film opens with a man (Rio Dewanto) waking up buried in a shallow grave in the middle of a forest with no recollection of what happened to him. He finds that he has a family and therefore traverses through the jungle trying to reunite with his wife and children. However, he soon discovers that he is not alone and there is someone attempting to kill him and his family.

== Cast ==
- Rio Dewanto as John Evans
- Hannah Al Rashid as Woman
- Izzi Isman as Girl
- Aridh Tritama as Boy
- Sadha Triyudha as Older Son
- Jose Gamo as Younger Son
- Marsha Timothy as Wife
- Surya Saputra as Husband

== Production ==
=== Development ===
Anwar has stated that he first conceived the idea for the film in 2006. According to producer Sheila Timothy, Anwar first shared the story with her in 2009 while making The Forbidden Door, which she also produced through Lifelike Pictures.

=== Filming ===
Shooting took place in Mount Pancar in Sentul, West Java, across 10 days in November 2011.

== Release ==
Ritual was released in theaters in Indonesia on 26 April 2012. It was also selected for screening at the 2012 South by Southwest in Austin, Texas, United States.

== Reception ==
The film received mixed reviews upon release. Anton Bitel of Little White Lies gave Ritual a positive review, calling the narrative "disorienting" with an ending that "makes all the disparate elements in the film cohere in an ingenious, unsettling manner". In an indifferent review, Cornila Desyana of Tempo called the film "absurd" and criticized the lack of dialogues even for the lead character.

John Townsend of Starburst criticized the film, saying "Instead of what could have been a taut, tense thriller, Ritual descends into a weary chase movie where you never really care who is chasing whom, or why."

== Awards and nominations ==
Year	Award	Category	Recipient	Result
2012	32nd Citra Awards	Best Sound	Khikmawan Santosa; Yusuf A. Patawari	Nominated
2012	Molins Film Festival	Best Director	Joko Anwar	Won
2012	South by Southwest	Midnight Audience Award	Ritual	Nominated
2013	Fantasporto	Orient Express Grand Prize	Joko Anwar; Lifelike Pictures	Nominated
2013	Fantasporto	Orient Express Special Jury Award	Joko Anwar; Lifelike Pictures	Nominated
