= Ario Bayu =

Indonesian actor

- Born: Ario Bayu Wicaksono; February 6, 1985 (age 41); Jakarta, Indonesia
- Occupations: Celebrity, model, singer
- Years active: 2004–present

Ario Bayu Wicaksono (born 6 February 1985) is an Indonesian actor, singer, and model.

== Early life and career ==
Born in Jakarta to Javanese parents, Ario Bayu had spent nearly all of his formative years in the city of Hamilton, New Zealand, where his father studied and then went into business. He returned to Indonesia in 2004 with the intent to pursue his acting and music ambitions.

He studied at the Globe Theatre in London, UK.

In his first break through role, Ario Bayu plays a detective in Dead Time: Kala, Indonesia's first tribute to film noir which won rave reviews from critics, directed by Joko Anwar.

In 2013, Ario Bayu played alongside Hollywood actress Joan Chen in HBO Asia's production Serangoon Road.

In Java Heat, Ario Bayu plays opposite Kellan Lutz and Oscar nominee Mickey Rourke.

In Soekarno: Indonesia Merdeka (2013), Ario Bayu plays the protagonist Sukarno, founding President of Indonesia. He reprised the same role in the 2021 war film Kadet 1947, focusing on the Indonesian War of Independence.

== Filmography ==
=== Film ===
Year	Title	Role	Notes
2004	Bangsal 13		
2005	Belahan Jiwa	Father's Cempaka	
2006	Pesan Dari Surga		
2007	Dead Time: Kala	Eros	
2008	In the Name of Love		
2008	The Tarix Jabrix	Max	
2008	Laskar Pelangi	Lintang	
2008	Drupadi	Bima	
2009	The Forbidden Door	Dandung	
2009	Macabre	Adjie	
2010	Merah Putih II: Darah Garuda	Yanto	
2011	Catatan (Harian) si Boy	Satrio	
2012	Dilema	Bayu Sustoyo	Segment: "The Officer"
2013	Dead Mine	Captain Tino	
2013	Java Heat	Lieutenant Hashim	
2013	La Tahzan	Hasan	
2013	Soekarno: Indonesia Merdeka	Soekarno	
2015	Melancholy is a Movement	Bayu	
2015	A Copy of My Mind	Hitman / Man in Black	
2016	Ada Apa Dengan Cinta? 2	Trian	
2016	Headshot	Jakarta Police Captain	
2017	Banda the Dark Forgotten Trail	Narrator	Documentary film
2017	5 Cowok Jagoan	Yanto	
2018	Bunda, Cinta 2 Kodi	Fahrul	
2018	22 Menit	AKBP Ardi	
2018	Buffalo Boys	Jamar	
2018	Sultan Agung: Tahta, Perjuangan, Cinta	Sultan Agung	
2018	One Two Jaga	Sugiman	Also executive producer
2018	The Returning	Colin	
2019	27 Steps of May	Magician	
2019	Gundala	Ghazul	
2019	Ratu Ilmu Hitam	Hanif	
2019	Perempuan Tanah Jahanam	Ki Saptadi	
2020	Frangipani Rising	Nyoman	
2020	Asih 2	Razan	
2021	Kadet 1947	Soekarno	
2024	Till Death Do Us Part	Edwin	
2024	Samsara	Darta	

=== Television series ===
Year	Title	Role	Network	Notes
2010	Police 86	Edo	Trans TV	Season 1
2013	Serangoon Road	Inspector Amran	HBO Asia	9 episodes
2015–2016	Halfworlds	Juragan	HBO Asia	Season 1, 7 episodes
2016	Cleansing Kalijodo	Krishna Murti	CI	
2019	Food Lore	Man at the Restaurant	HBO Asia	Tamarind (Cameo)
2020	The Bridge	Lieutenant Heriyanto Salim	HBO Asia/Viu	Season 2, 10 episodes
2023	Cigarette Girl (Indonesian: Gadis Kretek)	Raja	Netflix	Mini-series, main character

== Awards and nominations ==
Year	Award	Category	Work	Result
2013	Indonesian Film Festival	Citra Award for Best Leading Actor	Soekarno: Indonesia Merdeka	Nominated
2014	Maya Award	Best Actor in a Leading Role	Soekarno: Indonesia Merdeka	Nominated
2018	Indonesian Film Festival	Citra Award for Best Leading Actor	Sultan Agung: Tahta, Perjuangan, Cinta	Nominated
2020	Indonesian Film Festival	Citra Award for Best Leading Actor	Impetigore	Nominated
