= Dead Time: Kala =

2007 Indonesian neo-noir thriller film

- Indonesian theatrical poster
- Kala
- Directed by: Joko Anwar
- Written by: Joko Anwar
- Produced by: Dhamoo Punjabi; Manoj Punjabi
- Starring: Fachri Albar; Ario Bayu; Shanty; Fahrani; August Melasz
- Cinematography: Ipung Rachmat Syaiful
- Edited by: Wawan I. Wibowo
- Music by: Aghi Narottama; Zeke Khaseli
- Production company: MD Pictures
- Distributed by: MD Entertainment
- Release date: 19 April 2007
- Running time: 102 minutes
- Country: Indonesia
- Language: Indonesian

Dead Time: Kala (also known as Kala, Dead Time, or The Secret) is a 2007 Indonesian neo-noir thriller film written and directed by Joko Anwar. The film stars an ensemble cast led by Fachri Albar, Ario Bayu, Shanty, and Fahrani. It was released on 19 April 2007 and being the MD Entertainment's first film, which originated as the television series producer years prior.

At the 27th Citra Awards, the film won 3 out of its 7 nominations. Sight & Sound selected the film as one of the best films of 2007 and named Anwar one of the smartest filmmakers in Asia.

== Plot ==
Police officers Eros and Hendro are investigating a case where five men were burned alive by a mob. Meanwhile, narcoleptic journalist Janus hides a tape recorder to interview the pregnant wife of one of the victims, Asih, whom he later witnesses walking into traffic and dies. At dinner with his friend Soebandi, Janus plays back the tape, where Asih declares unprompted in Javanese, "It is on Bendonowongso Hill, in front of the Seven Stair Temple". Soebandi gets stalked by a white-skinned creature and mutilated. Janus is taken in for questioning by Eros and Resort Chief Bambang.

Janus learns that Asih, her husband, and her father Ronggoweni, died within the week, leaving only Asih's sister Ranti, who tells him that if he reveals Asih's message, then either he or the person who hears it must die. Janus gets kidnapped by Tourism and Culture Minister Haryo Wibowo, who, after inquiring where "the place" is, immolates him. Meanwhile, Eros learns that the mob attacked the five men after hearing a woman accuse them of being thieves. Hendro reveals to Eros that Ronggoweni was an adjutant to the First President, who was fabled to have hidden glorious treasure. The white-skinned creature appears to Eros and tells him to "accept [his] destiny".

Waking up unscathed, Janus goes home and finds his wife Sari, who expresses remorse over their divorcing. After Janus tells her everything, Sari delivers Asih's message to Haryo, who kills her after she told him Janus is dead. Haryo learns that Janus is still alive, gets stalked by the white-skinned creature, and beheaded offscreen. Janus attempts suicide but is rescued by the creature, who is revealed to have been keeping him from harm. He gets kidnapped by Bambang's men as Eros and Hendro find Ranti, who confesses that Ronggoweni was the secret keeper of the location of the First President's treasure. Since only one person can know the secret, Ronggoweni killed himself after his son-in-law forced him to reveal it. His son-in-law told his wife Asih and four of his friends, forcing Ranti to get the men lynched to protect her pregnant sister. Eros tracks down Bambang while Hendro takes Ranti to the library, suspecting a connection with the prophecy of the Kediri King Jayabaya, who foretold the rise of a messianic Ratu Adil.

Hendro learns that the treasure was bestowed to the First President by the former kings of Nusantara. He instructed his adjutants to hide it and kill each other until one remained. The white-skinned creature, Pindoro, is revealed to be the supernatural guardian of the treasure. Hendro finds in the prophecy that a "sleeper", who is Janus, shall rise as the trustworthy keeper of the treasure's location and have a protector, who is Ranti after inheriting the role from Ronggoweni. Bambang and a group of Ministers arrive with Janus at the Seven Stair Temple and Eros gets shot in the scuffle. Ranti appears, murders Bambang and the Ministers, then kneels before Eros, whom she reveals to be the prophesied Ratu Adil. Hendro reads the rest of Jayabaya's prophecy, which foretells that their meeting will usher in an era of national prosperity as well as a great struggle. Janus, Eros, and Ranti depart from Bendonowongso Hill with Pindoro.

== Cast ==
- Fachri Albar as Janus
- Ario Bayu as Eros
- Fahrani as Ranti
- Shanty as Sari
- August Melasz as Hendro Waluyo
- Arswendi Nasution as Haryo Wibowo
- Sujiwo Tejo as Ronggoweni
- Frans Tumbuan as Bambang Sutrisno
- Tipi Jabrik as Bandi
- José Rizal Manua as Pindoro
- Agung Udijana as Bimo

== Production ==
In an interview with CineCrib in 2019, Anwar said that he was approached by MD Pictures executive Manoj Punjabi who wanted him to direct the film adaptation of the best-selling book Ayat-Ayat Cinta. However, he declined the offer as he did not feel like he was the right person to direct a religious film. Instead, he told Punjabi and his team the idea he had at the time for Dead Time: Kala and reached a deal immediately. This was notable as MD Pictures was then known only as a soap opera production studio. The film was shot in 28 days.

== Release ==
Dead Time: Kala was released theatrically in Indonesia on April 19, 2007, and on December 20, 2007, in Malaysia. It was screened at several international film festivals, including Bucheon International Fantastic Film Festival and Vancouver International Film Festival.

== Reception ==
Dead Time: Kala received critical acclaim upon release. Ard Vijn of Screen Anarchy gave the film a rave review, calling it a "wonderful mix of film noir and Asian horror" and that "It manages to be both a decent thriller which looks incredibly slick". Panos Kotzathanasis of Asian Movie Pulse wrote that "In terms of style, the film is absolutely magnificent" while singling out the cinematography as "a thing of beauty" and the score's violin tracks for "heightening the sense of agony" in the film.

James Guild of Cinema Escapist called the film "a Javanese neo-noir masterpiece". In conclusion, Guild noted "This hybridization of styles, themes, and symbols underlines the complex ideas Joko Anwar explores in Kala. It reflects Joko Anwar’s enduring interest in taking the home-grown myths, legends, and folklore of Indonesia and putting them on the big screen. But by cladding them in the visual language of one of Western cinema’s most classic genres, and then sprinkling a whiff of social relevance through the use of Javanese mythology, he imbues the film with a sense of style and thematic resonance that is both familiar and also wholly unique." Leila Chudori of Tempo praised the film's cinematography and Anwar's complex screenplay, noting that the film "is told in a new language; not the Indonesian language, but Joko Anwar's language".

In a more mixed review, Maggie Lee of The Hollywood Reporter highlighted the ending as "somewhat of a letdown, as a scene-by-scene re-enactment explains everything leaving no room to the imagination" while still praising Anwar for "rewriting the formulas of mainstream Indonesian cinema".

British film magazine Sight & Sound, published by the British Film Institute, picked Dead Time: Kala as one of the year's best films while naming Anwar as one of the smartest filmmakers in Asia.

== Awards and nominations ==
Year	Award	Category	Recipients	Result
2007	27th Citra Awards	Best Actor	Fachri Albar	Nominated
2007	27th Citra Awards	Best Supporting Actress	Shanty	Nominated
2007	27th Citra Awards	Best Editing	Wawan I. Wibowo	Nominated
2007	27th Citra Awards	Best Cinematography	Ipung Rachmat Syaiful	Won
2007	27th Citra Awards	Best Art Direction	Wencislaus	Won
2007	27th Citra Awards	Best Sound	Khikmawan Santosa	Nominated
2007	27th Citra Awards	Special Award for Best Use of Indonesian Language in a Film	Kala	Won
2007	MTV Indonesia Movie Awards	Best Running Scene	Fachri Albar	Nominated
2007	MTV Indonesia Movie Awards	Most Favorite Actor	Fachri Albar	Nominated
