= Maya Award for Best Director =

Annual Indonesian film award

- Awarded for: Best Director of the Year
- Country: Indonesia
- First award: 2012
- Currently held by: Riri Riza; Athirah (2016)
- Website: pialamaya.com

The Maya Award for Best Director is one of the Maya Awards presented annually since the awards debuted in 2012, that is initiated by FILM_Indonesia Twitter account.

The nominations and winners of the awards are selected by a panel of judges consisting of Indonesian film critics and filmmakers, including directors, actors, and actresses.

== Winners and nominees ==
indicates the winner

=== 2010s ===
Year	Director(s)	Film
2012	Teddy Soeriaatmadja *	Lovely Man
2012	Eugene Panji	Cita-Citaku Setinggi Langit
2012	Garin Nugroho	Mata Tertutup
2012	Gareth Evans	The Raid: Redemption
2012	Viva Westi	Rayya, Cahaya di Atas Cahaya
2013	Mouly Surya *	What They Don't Talk About When They Talk About Love
2013	Dinna Jasanti	Laura & Marsha
2013	Ifa Isfansyah	9 Summers 10 Autumns
2013	Riri Riza	Sokola Rimba
2013	Upi	Belenggu
2014	Angga Dwimas Sasongko *	Cahaya Dari Timur: Beta Maluku
2014	Lucky Kuswandi	Selamat Pagi, Malam
2014	Hanung Bramantyo	Soekarno: Indonesia Merdeka
2014	Lasja Fauzia Susatyo	Sebelum Pagi Terulang Kembali
2014	Rako Prijanto	3 Nafas Likas
2015	Garin Nugroho *	Guru Bangsa: Tjokroaminoto
2015	Angga Dwimas Sasongko	Filosofi Kopi
2015	Anggy Umbara	3: Alif Lam Mim
2015	Benni Setiawan	Toba Dreams
2015	Ismail Basbeth	Mencari Hilal
2016	Riri Riza *	Athirah
2016	Angga Dwimas Sasongko	Surat Dari Praha
2016	Hari Suhariyadi	Sunya
2016	Herwin Novianto	Aisyah: Biarkan Kami Bersaudara
2016	Joko Anwar	A Copy of My Mind

== Multiple wins and nominations ==
The following individuals have received Best Director awards:

Wins	Director
1	Teddy Soeriaatmadja
1	Mouly Surya
1	Angga Dwimas Sasongko
1	Garin Nugroho
1	Riri Riza

The following individuals have received multiple Best Director nominations:

Nominations	Director
2	Angga Dwimas Sasongko
2	Riri Riza
2	Garin Nugroho
