= Munkar (film) =

- Poster
- Directed by: Anggy Umbara
- Screenplay by: Evelyn Afnilia
- Produced by: Manoj Punjabi
- Starring: Adhisty Zara; Safira Ratu Sofya; Saskia Chadwick
- Cinematography: Dicky R. Maland
- Edited by: Gita Miaji
- Music by: Ricky Lionardi
- Production companies: MD Pictures; Pichouse Films; Umbara Brothers Films
- Distributed by: MD Pictures
- Release date: 7 February 2024
- Country: Indonesia
- Language: Indonesian

Munkar is a 2024 Indonesian horror film directed by Anggy Umbara and produced by Manoj Punjabi with the production company of MD Pictures, Pichouse Films and Umbara Brothers Films. The film stars Adhisty Zara, Ratu Sofya, Saskia Chadwick and others.

== Cast ==
- Adhisty Zara as Ranum
- Ratu Sofya as Herlina
- Saskia Chadwick as Robiatul
- Kaneishia Yusuf as Siti
- Khadijah Aruma as Dilla
- Elma Theana as Umi Yayu
- Tio Pakusadewo as Darroes
- Ayu Hastari as Umi Indri
- Miqdad Addausy as Ustaz Ghani
- Husein Al Athas as Jaffar
- Vonny Anggraini as Dewi
- Santana Sartana as Sapto
- Egy Fedly as Tarjo
- Sheva Audrey as a female student

== Release ==
The film officially premiered in Indonesian cinemas on February 7, 2024. Prior to its wide theatrical release, the film generated significant public attention and anticipation following the release of its promotional trailers, driven by its narrative focus on a well-known East Java urban legend from the Lamongan region.

== Reception ==
=== Critical response ===
Rani Asnurida of IDN Times praised the film for its strong acting performances, particularly by Ratu Sofya, and its creative, unconventional horror scenes that effectively built tension without relying heavily on jump scares. The review also commended the realistic boarding school (pesantren) setting, natural music scoring, and the inclusion of a relevant bullying theme. However, the critic noted that the resolution felt formulaic and predictable due to the stereotypical inclusion of a cleric (ustaz) figure at the climax, though it was somewhat redeemed by an unexpected plot twist.

Reviewing for VOI.id, Virgilery Levana praised Munkar for its slow-burn pacing and character development, noting that the film builds continuous tension through visuals rather than relying on excessive jump scares or sound effects. Levana commended the performances of Adhisty Zara and Ratu Sofya, highlighting Zara's convincing portrayal of a quiet, hijab-wearing student and Sofya's eerie, impactful performance. Additionally, the reviewer lauded director Anggy Umbara for delivering an unpredictable plot twist and introducing a unique, unsettling sense of terror centered around Islamic prayer rituals.

Writing for Kompasiana, Siska Fajarrany highlighted Munkar as an example of the positive evolution in contemporary Indonesian horror cinema, shifting away from superficial adult themes or forced characterizations toward more refined storytelling. She noted that the film succeeds in delivering intense psychological dread and frightening mystical atmospheres based on East Java folklore, demonstrating that a horror film can still effectively terrify audiences without relying solely on typical gore or slasher-thriller elements.

Reviewing for Warta Bulukumba, Sri Ulfanita commended Munkar for successfully blending supernatural horror with sharp social commentary, particularly regarding the psychological impact of bullying within a boarding school (pesantren) community. The review highly praised Anggy Umbara's direction along with the lead performances of Adhisty Zara, Ratu Sofya, and Saskia Chadwick for their emotional depth. Additionally, it lauded the film's technical execution, noting that its detailed production design, smooth editing, and effective use of cinematography and sound design significantly heightened the overall tension.

Writing for Yoursay Suara, Athar Farha gave Munkar a negative review with a score of 3.5 out of 10. Farha criticized the film's short runtime of around 80 minutes, stating that it led to a rushed narrative pace and a lack of depth. The review also pointed out that the horror elements relied heavily on repetitive jump scares, while the central ghost character lacked proper development and felt generic. Additionally, Farha noted that despite being marketed as a lead actor, Adhisty Zara's character felt sidelined and lacked emotional depth, concluding that the final plot twist felt forced.

Rania Reihanah of Arts Help analyzed Munkar through a sociological lens, framing it as a critique of systemic hypocrisy, toxic seniority, and the normalization of hazing (perundungan) within Asian and Indonesian education systems. Reihanah noted that while the film operates on the surface as an entertaining supernatural revenge fantasy, it carries deeper socio-cultural significance by exploring institutional abuse, trauma, and female agency. The review also highlighted the character dynamic between the vengeful Herlina and her compassionate roommate Ranum, describing it as a representation of emotional codependency and the psychological need for human connection during trauma recovery.
