= Waktu Maghrib 2 =

- Poster
- Directed by: Sidharta Tata
- Produced by: Gope T. Samtani
- Starring: Omar Daniel; Anantya Kirana; Sulthan Hamonangan
- Cinematography: Mandela Majid
- Edited by: Helmi Nur Rasyid
- Music by: Fajar Ahadi
- Production company: Rapi Films
- Release date: 28 May 2025
- Country: Indonesia
- Language: Indonesian

Waktu Maghrib 2 is a 2025 Indonesian horror film directed by Sidharta Tata and produced by Gope T. Samtani with the production company of Rapi Films. The film stars Omar Daniel, Anantya Kirana, Sulthan Hamonangan and others. It is a sequel to the film Waktu Maghrib.

== Cast ==
- Omar Daniel as Adi
- Anantya Kirana as Wulan
- Sultan Hamonangan as Yugo
- Ghazi Alhabsyi as Dewo
- Muzakki Ramdhan as Endro
- Sadana Agung as Hansip
- Nopek Novian as Naufal
- Bagas Pratama Saputra as Amir
- Fita Anggriani as Ayu

== Release ==
Prior to its theatrical distribution, a two-minute official trailer for Waktu Maghrib 2 was published on the official Rapi Films YouTube channel. The horror sequel was officially released in Indonesian cinemas on May 28, 2025.

== Reception ==
=== Critical response ===
The film received mixed responses from the audience and critics. Writing for Nyala Nusantara, Karso Aji praised Waktu Maghrib 2 for its distinctiveness from conventional horror films, highlighting director Sidharta Tata's ability to blend strong local lore with impressive visuals and authentic rural cinematography. The review noted that the film relies less on jumpscares, opting instead for high-intensity physical tension through chase and fight sequences. While praising the convincing performances of the cast, the review pointed out that the emotional depth and background of Adi, the central character played by Omar Daniel, could have been further explored. Overall, due to its increased violence and intense horror elements, the sequel received a 17+ age rating, contrasting with its child-led cast.

Writing for Yoursay Suara, Ryan Farizzal gave Waktu Maghrib 2 a rating of 7.5 out of 10. He praised the film's tense atmosphere, effective sound design, and elevated visuals, particularly highlighting the nighttime chase sequences in the forest and the standout performance of young actress Anantya Kirana. The review also noted the sequel's willingness to push horror boundaries with intense gore. However, Farizzal criticized the narrative for feeling somewhat repetitive and derivative of the first film's template. He further remarked that the mythology surrounding the entity Ummu Sibyan remained shallow, and noted that certain elements such as repetitive jumpscares, stiff acting from some child actors during possession scenes, and an insensitive joke detracted from the overall experience.

In a negative review for Kompasiana, Angra Priya criticized Waktu Maghrib 2 for failing to live up to the quality of its predecessor. Priya stated that despite its 20-year time jump, the sequel relied on a repetitive and unoriginal formula rather than expanding the narrative. The review also faulted the shallow character development, unconvincing prosthetic makeup, excessive visual effects, and inconsistent color grading. Furthermore, Priya noted that the film suffered from poor pacing and an overly noisy musical score, which disrupted the overall tension and led them to conclude that the sequel was an unnecessary addition to the story.
