= 402 Haunted Korean Hospital =

2026 Indonesian horror film

- Teaser poster
- Directed by: Anggy Umbara
- Screenplay by: Lele Laila
- Based on: Gonjiam: Haunted Asylum by: Jung Bum-sik; Park Sang-min
- Produced by: Manoj Punjabi
- Starring: Arbani Yasiz; Saputra Kori; Diandra Agatha; Elang El Gibran; Lea Ciarachel
- Cinematography: Rama Hermawan
- Edited by: Gita Miaji
- Production companies: Pichouse Films; Umbara Brothers Films
- Distributed by: MD Pictures
- Release date: 6 July 2026
- Country: Indonesia
- Language: Indonesian

402 Haunted Korean Hospital (Indonesian: 402 Rumah Sakit Angker Korea) is 2026 Indonesian horror film directed by Anggy Umbara. It is based on the film Gonjiam: Haunted Asylum by Jung Bum-sik and Park Sang-min. The film stars Arbani Yasiz, Saputra Kori, and Diandra Agatha. It premiered in Indonesian cinemas on July 9, 2026.

== Plot ==
A group of young Indonesians embark on a horror expedition to South Korea. They intend to livestream and investigate an abandoned hospital called Yogwon Hospital. Initially, they thought this trip would be just another test of courage to gain popularity. However, as soon as they enter the hospital grounds, surrounded by dense forests and ancient graves, they realize they've fallen into an invisible trap. One by one they begin to be terrorized by an aggressive supernatural entity.

== Cast ==
- Arbani Yasiz as Juna
- Saputra Kori as Adit
- Diandra Agatha as Arum
- Eagle El Gibran as Bara
- Lea Ciarachel as Yuri
- Jang Han-Sol as Dae-Ho
- Aylena Fusil as Tyas

== Production ==
In April 2026, MD Pictures and Pichouse Films work together with Umbara Brothers Film to create an adaptation of 2018 South Korean found footage horror film, Gonjiam: Haunted Asylum, Anggy Umbara and Lele Laila were also directing and writing the film. Arbani Yasiz, Saputra Kori, Elang El Gibran, Diandra Agatha, Lea Ciarachel, Aylena Fusil, and Jang Han-sol were cast in the film. Principal photography began in South Korea.

== Release ==
The film officially expanded its regional distribution and debuted in Malaysian cinemas on July 15, 2026. The theatrical release was heavily promoted as a cross-cultural collaboration, blending contemporary South Korean horror concepts with Indonesian terror elements to appeal to Southeast Asian horror audiences. The film was featured at the 2026 Bucheon International Fantastic Film Festival (BIFAN). The publication highlighted the movie as a notable example of a cross-cultural cinematic project, functioning as an Indonesian horror adaptation that reimagines the prominent South Korean urban legend surrounding the haunted hospital. The film's inclusion in the festival underscored growing international interest in Southeast Asian genre filmmaking and its creative collaborations with East Asian horror concepts.

== Reception ==
=== Critical response ===
Writing for CNN Indonesia, Endro Priherdityo gave the film a mixed review. He praised the film's production design, cinematography, and minimal use of jump-scare scoring, noting that the abandoned hospital set was highly convincing and the visuals were clean. However, Priherdityo criticized the forced inclusion of Indonesian mystical elements such as the jelangkung which he felt felt out of place and "cringe" in a story set in South Korea. He also pointed out that the additional plot elements and plot twists felt underdeveloped compared to the original Gonjiam: Haunted Asylum (2018), and argued that the polished editing took away from the raw, authentic feel typical of the found-footage horror genre.

Writing for Liputan 6, Ratnaning Asih noted that as a remake, 402 Rumah Sakit Angker Korea remains faithful to several iconic elements and camera movements from the original film, Gonjiam: Haunted Asylum (2018), including the graffiti scenes, floating fabric, and possession sequences. However, Asih highlighted that the film still offers surprises for viewers by integrating distinct Indonesian cultural elements, such as character backstories and the inclusion of the jelangkung ritual performed with Korean incantations. She also noted that the remake deviates significantly from the original with a completely different ending.

Writing for Radio Republik Indonesia, Irene Amora highlighted the film's strong reputation as one of South Korea's most terrifying horror films. The review praised its effective found-footage and mockumentary style, noting that the claustrophobic setting of the abandoned asylum and the gradual escalation of supernatural occurrences successfully deliver intense dread and psychological horror to the audience without heavily relying on conventional tropes.

Writing for Aruna 9 News, Annisa Ainaya Salsabila highlighted the film's distinct approach to adapting the urban legend surrounding the Gonjiam Psychiatric Hospital. The review noted that the film stands out from typical adaptations by offering a different atmosphere and narrative execution, effectively maintaining high suspense and delivering intense psychological dread through its presentation of supernatural occurrences within the notorious haunted location.

A critic of Orasi.id noted that while 402: Rumah Sakit Angker Korea possessed high creative ambitions, the final execution felt somewhat unrefined. The critic commended the film's atmospheric production and its attempt to bridge South Korean and Indonesian horror elements, but concluded that certain narrative aspects and pacing felt underdeveloped, preventing the film from fully realizing its potential.

Shandy Pradana of IDN Times praised 402: Rumah Sakit Angker Korea for its intense, spooky atmosphere and highly commendable acting performances. The critic noted that the film successfully delivers consistent tension and terrifying sequences. However, the review pointed out some weaknesses in the pacing of the narrative towards the middle of the film, although it concluded that the strong horror execution and technical aspects still made it a worthwhile viewing experience for genre fans.

Nadiatul Hasanah of Memorandum Disway highlighted the film as a notable Indonesian horror adaptation of the famous South Korean film Gonjiam: Haunted Asylum. The critic praised the adaptation for successfully translating the terrifying atmosphere of the original psychiatric hospital setting into a format that resonates with local Indonesian horror sensibilities. While noting its reliance on familiar haunted house tropes, the review commended its suspenseful buildup and strong production values, which effectively maintained a sense of dread throughout.

Prabha Winangun of Nyala Nusantara praised 402: Rumah Sakit Angker Korea for its creative attempt to adapt the acclaimed South Korean horror film Gonjiam: Haunted Asylum by infusing it with local Indonesian horror elements. The critic noted that this cultural blend successfully added a fresh layer of terror, making the familiar premise feel distinct. While the film relied on established horror tropes, the review commended its strong local flavor, solid atmosphere, and its ability to deliver an engaging experience for Indonesian horror enthusiasts.

=== Audience response ===
On the film-review platform Letterboxd, the film received generally positive to mixed reviews from horror enthusiasts. A large portion of the audience praised its effective use of the found-footage format, high-tension atmosphere, and genuine, unsettling scares in the final act, often ranking it as one of the creepier contemporary Asian horror films. Conversely, critical reactions from some users pointed out a slow first half, formulaic character setups, and predictable plot devices common to the mockumentary genre.
