= List of Indonesian films of 2023 =

The following is a list of Indonesian feature films showing in theaters and those being channeled on video-on-demand services in 2023.

== Box office collection ==
Rank	Film	Production	Viewer
1	Sewu Dino	MD Pictures	4.863.533
2	Waktu Maghrib	Rapi Films	2.409.122
3	Suzzanna: Malam Jumat Kliwon	Soraya Intercine Films	2.189.363
4	Ketika Berhenti di Sini	Sinemaku Pictures	1.611.005
5	Air Mata di Ujung Sajadah	Beehave Pictures	1.539.208
6	Buya Hamka Vol. I	Falcon Pictures	1.297.791
7	Khanzab	Dee Company	1.166.706
8	Sosok Ketiga	Leo Pictures	1.162.291
9	Jalan yang Jauh, Jangan Lupa Pulang	Visinema Pictures	866.367
10	Hello Ghost	Falcon Pictures	613.312
11	Mangkujiwo 2	MVP Pictures	555.934
12	Hati Suhita	Starvision Plus	507.167
13	Bayi Ajaib	Falcon Pictures	434.228
14	Susuk: Kutukan Kecantikan	Visinema Pictures	422.426
15	Galaksi	Rapi Films	421.216

== Film ==
=== January ===
- Puisi Cinta yang Membunuh (5 January)
- Alena Anak Ratu Iblis(5 January)
- Balada Si Roy (19 January)
- Autobiography (19 January)

=== February ===
- Jalan yang Jauh, Jangan Lupa Pulang (2 February)
- Gita Cinta dari SMA (9 February)- Teenage romance
- Dear David (9 February) - Fantasy Romantic
- Cherish & Ruelle (10 February) - Thriller
- Para Betina Pengikut Iblis (16 February) - Horror
- Berbalas Kejam(16 February) - Thriller
- Bismillah Kunikahi Suamimu (23 February) - Romantic Drama
- Pesugihan: Bersekutu dengan Iblis (23 February) - Horror

=== March ===
- Virgo and the Sparklings (2 March)- Super Hero
- Kembang Api (2 March) - Thiller
- Perjanjian Gaib (9 March)-Horror
- Zodiac: Apa Bintangmu? (9 March)- Romantic Drama
- Iblis dalam Darah (16 March))- Horror
- Losmen Melati (16 March) -Horror
- Hantu Baru (23 March) - Horror Comedy
- Tulah 6/13(30 March) - Horror
- Surga di Bawah Langit (30 March) - Musical

=== April ===
- Pelet Tali Pocong (6 April) - Horror
- Kutukan Cakar Monyet (6 April) - Horror
- Sewu Dino (19 April) - Horror
- Hitmen (27 April)- Action Comedy

=== May ===
- My Idiot Brother 2: Angel, Kami Semua Punya Mimpi (4 May) - Drama
- Hello Ghost (11 May) - Comedy
- Bukannya Aku Tidak Mau Nikah (11 May) - Romance
- Kajiman: Iblis Terkejam Penagih Janji (18 May) - Horror
- Hati Suhita (25 May) - Drama
- Jin Khodam (25 May) - Horror

=== Jun ===
- Detektif Jaga Jarak (1 June) - Comedy
- Spirit Doll(1 June) - Horror
- Star Syndrome (8 June)- Comedy
- Kutukan Sembilan Setan (8 June)- Horror
- Sosok Ketiga (22 June) -Horror
- 200 Pounds Beauty (22 June) -Comedy
- Why Do You Love Me (28 June)- Comedy
- Ganjil Genap (28 June)- Comedy

=== July ===
- Ketika Berhenti di Sini (27 July) - Drama
- Mantra Surugana (27 July) -Horror
- Dunia Tanpa Suara (27 July) - Drama

=== August ===
- Suzzanna: Malam Jumat Kliwon (3 August) - Horror
- Primbon (10 August) -Horror
- Catatan Si Boy (17 August) - Drama
- Galaksi (23 August) - Drama
- Susuk: Kutukan Kecantikan (31 August) - Horror

=== September ===
- Sleep Call (7 September)- Thriller
- Air Mata di Ujung Sajadah (7 September)- Family Drama
- Kisah Tanah Jawa: Pocong Gundul (21 September) - Horror

=== November ===
- Sijjin (9 November)
