= Ivanna (2022 film) =

2022 Indonesian horror film

- Theatrical film poster
- Directed by: Kimo Stamboel
- Written by: Lele Laila
- Screenplay by: Lele Laila, Risa Saraswati
- Story by: Ivanna van dijk by Risa Saraswati
- Produced by: Manoj Punjabi
- Starring: Caitlin Halderman; Jovarel Callum; Junior Roberts; Shandy William; Sonia Alyssa
- Cinematography: Patrick Tashadian
- Edited by: Arifin Cu'unk
- Music by: Fajar Yuskemal
- Production companies: MD Pictures; Pichouse Films
- Distributed by: MD Entertainment
- Release date: July 14, 2022
- Running time: 103 minutes
- Country: Indonesia
- Languages: Indonesian; Dutch; Japanese
- Box office: $8.5 million

Ivanna is a 2022 Indonesian horror thriller directed by Kimo Stamboel and written by Lele Laila, starring Caitlin Halderman, Jovarel Callum, Junior Roberts, Shandy William, and Sonia Alyssa. The film story is adapted from a novel written by Risa Saraswati and the film is the spin-off from Danur 2: Maddah and part of Danur universe. It follows Ivanna, a Dutch female ghost introduced by Risa's five ghost friends in the movie Danur 2: Maddah.

Ivanna was released in Indonesian cinemas on July 14, 2022 and for worldwide audience on Amazon Prime Video. It was a major box office success in Indonesia making it the fourth highest grossing Indonesian film in 2022.

== Plot ==
When Ambar and Dika leave their home after their parent's death, the siblings never imagine that what was supposedly a new start would turn out to be the beginning of their greatest misery. The fateful events to come are fueled by Ambar's ability to sense the unseen, acquired after her vision began to fail. Despite the warm welcome they receive at a retirement home, Ambar sees an eerie vision of the past. She learns that a slaughter took place in the house many years before. A Dutch woman, Ivanna, appears in Ambar's vision. She glimpses the tragedy of Ivanna's decapitation by a vile imperialist.

On the day of Eid al-Fitr, Grandma Ani is found beheaded in a gruesome pool of blood. Ambar realizes that the tragedy may be related to her earlier discovery of a chest filled with trinkets and a headless statue in the basement of the nursing home.

Ambar must try to halt the vengeance of an entity that is slowly creeping into their lives.

== Cast ==
- Caitlin Halderman as Ambar
- Jovarel Callum as Dika
- Junior Roberts as Arthur
- Shandy William as Agus
- Sonia Alyssa as Ivanna Van Dijk
- Taskya Namya as Rina
- Yayu Unru as Kakek Farid
- Rina Hasyim as Oma Ida
- Yati Surachman as Nenek Ani
- Tanta Ginting as Yudi
- Muhammad Khan as Syaiful
- Hiroaki Katō as Matsuya
- Kenes Andari as Wati

== Reception ==
=== Box office ===
Ivanna was a major box-office success in Indonesia. In its first week the film Ivanna garnered more than one million ticket sales. At the end of its domestic theatrical run it had achieved 2.7 million admissions with an estimated gross of Rp125 billion (US$8.5 million) making it the fourth highest grossing Indonesian film in 2022.
