= HMGNC =

Indonesian pop group

- Also known as: Homogenic (2002–2015)
- Origin: Bandung, West Java, Indonesia
- Genres: electronic; synthpop; trip hop; big beat
- Years active: 2002-present
- Labels: FFWD Records, UNKL347, Papermoon Records, demajors
- Members: Dina Dellyana; Grahadea Kusuf; Amandia Syachridar
- Past members: Risa Saraswati
- Website: hmgnc.net (archived)

Logo

HMGNC (a disemvoweling of their former name, Homogenic) is an Indonesian electronic and synth-pop band from Bandung, West Java. Named after Icelandic singer Björk’s 1997 album Homogenic, the band was formed in 2002 and changed the original band name to its present name in 2015. Original members are Risa Saraswati (vocals; replaced by Amandia Syachridar in 2009), Dina Dellyana (keyboards, synth, programming) and Grahadea Kusuf (synth, programming). HMGNC perform songs in both Indonesian and English and have produced four studio albums: Epic Symphony (2004), Echoes of the Universe (2006), Let a Thousand Flowers Bloom (2010), HMGNC (2017) and one EP: Let's Talk (2012).

== Career ==
The band formed in 2002 in Bandung, West Java, Indonesia, with initial members consisting of Risa Saraswati on lead vocals, Dina Dellyana on keyboards, and Grahadea Kusuf on synth and programming. The band name was derived from Icelandic pop singer Björk's 1997 album of the same title. Although they admired Björk in high school, they avoided trying to resemble her music. Homogenic signed with Indonesian indie label FFWD Records and later released their debut album, Epic Symphony in March 2004. The album mixed trip hop and downbeat electronic music with angelic vocals during the rise of electronic dance music (EDM) scene in Indonesia. Two singles released from the album: "Kekal" and "Taste of Harmony".

On April 2, 2006, the band released their second album, Echoes of the Universe, which marks the beginning of electronic and indie-pop influence in their musical style. "Utopia", "Untukmu, Duniaku" and "Unfolding Sympathy" were released as singles. Their songs were featured on the original soundtrack of the Indonesian indie film Cin(T)a, which was the first collaboration between the band and writer/director Sammaria Simanjuntak, which would continue to other projects and enable the band to perform in London, Birmingham, Newcastle and Manchester. It went on to become their last album with Saraswati. In October 2009, Saraswati announced her resignation as the lead singer to pursue her solo career and formed her own band, Sarasvati.

Homogenic released their third studio album, Let a Thousand Flowers Bloom, on April 17, 2010. This became the band's first studio album without Saraswati as well as their first album with new lead vocalist, Amandia Syachridar. The album also saw the band focus more on English songs rather than their native Indonesian. Two singles were released from this album: "Seringan Awan" and "Happy Without You". Let a Thousand Flowers Bloom would be the last studio album Homogenic released under FFWD.

In 2012, the band signed a contract with UNKL347 and released their first EP, Let's Talk containing five tracks. Homogenic reunited with Sammaria Simanjutak to produce the soundtrack for the film Demi Ucok for which they contributed its music score; "Get Up and Go" was the first single on the EP and was also featured on the Organic Records compilation Radio Killed the TV Star. It was followed by a second single, "Takkan Berhenti Disini", which gained rave responses from Indonesian junglist and drum bass scenes. Despite its Indonesian lyrics, the song swept three main awards at the Voice Independent Music Awards (VIMA) 2013, landing the Best Electronic Dance Song, Best Electro Dance Act and Thank You for Existing Awards.

In 2015, the band changed their original name from Homogenic to HMGNC by removing the letters O, E and I. They later signed with Papermoon Records and released two new singles, "Today and Forever", released in April 2015 and "Memories That Last a Dream", released in September 2015. HMGNC later released their third single, "This Too Shall Pass" featuring Agung, lead guitarist of Burgerkill. In October 2017, the band released their fourth studio album, which is self-titled and the first to adopt their present name since the band changes their original name two years earlier. The album saw the band reunite with Saraswati.

In September 2018, HMGNC headlined a tour in Japan from 6 to 14 September. The band released their new single, "When Love Awaits" on 15 November 2019.

== Band members ==
- Risa Saraswati – vocals (2002–2009)
- Dina Dellyana – keyboards, vocoder, programming (2002–2021)
- Grahadea Kusuf – synth, programming (2002–2021)
- Amanda Syachridar – vocals (2009–2021)

== Discography ==
=== Studio albums ===
Title	Album details	Notes
Epic Symphony	Released: March 2004; Label: FFWD Records; Formats: CD, cassette, digital download	Credited as Homogenic
Echoes of the Universe	Released: April 2006; Label: FFWD Records; Formats: CD, cassette, digital download	Credited as Homogenic
Let a Thousand Flowers Bloom	Released: April 2010; Label: FFWD Records; Formats: CD, digital download	Credited as Homogenic
HMGNC	Released: October 2017; Label: Demajors; Formats: CD, digital download	Credited as HMGNC

=== EP ===
Title	Album details	Notes
Let's Talk	Released: June 2012; Label: UNKL347; Formats: CD, digital download	Credited as Homogenic; Soundtrack album for Demi Ucok

=== Singles ===
Title	Featuring artist(s)	Year
"Today and Forever"		2015
"Memories That Last a Dream"		2015
"This Too Shall Pass"	Agung Burgerkill	2016
"When Love Awaits"		2019
"You Are Not Alone"		2020
"Lost in You"	Greybox	2020

== Filmography ==
=== TV commercials ===
Year	Title	Notes
2019	Djarum Coklat	with Che Cupumanik

== Awards and nominations ==
Year	Award(s)	Category	Recipient	Result	Ref.
2013	Voice Independent Music Awards 2013	Best Electronic Dance Song	"Takkan Berhenti Di Sini"	Won	
2013	Voice Independent Music Awards 2013	Best Electro Dance Act	Homogenic	Won	
2013	Voice Independent Music Awards 2013	Thank You for Existing Awards	Homogenic	Won	
