= Cinta Fitri (2021 TV series) =

2021 Indonesian drama streaming television series

- Genre: Drama; Romance
- Created by: Manoj Punjabi
- Based on: Cinta Fitri
- Screenplay by: QueenB
- Directed by: Anggy Umbara
- Starring: Tissa Biani; Rizky Nazar; Omar Daniel; Dimas Anggara; Lydia Kandou; Deden Bagaskara
- Opening theme: Atas Nama Cinta — Tissa Biani
- Ending theme: Atas Nama Cinta — Tissa Biani
- Composer: Ricky Lionardi
- Country of origin: Indonesia
- Original language: Indonesian
- No. of seasons: 1
- No. of episodes: 15

Production
- Executive producers: Dhamoo Punjabi; Jeff Han; Kaichen Li; Lesley Simpson
- Producer: Manoj Punjabi
- Cinematography: Awankjj
- Editor: Ahsan Andrian
- Camera setup: Multi-camera
- Running time: 30—42 minutes
- Production companies: MD Entertainment; Umbara Brothers Film

Original release
- Network: WeTV; Iflix; Trans TV
- Release: 5 October – 17 November 2021

Related
- Cinta Fitri

Cinta Fitri (lit. 'Fitri's love') is an Indonesian drama streaming television series adapted from television series of the same title which aired on WeTV and iflix. Producted by MD Entertainment and Umbara Brothers Film. This web series is the first web series from Anggy Umbara. It starred Tissa Biani and Rizky Nazar. The series is also airing on Trans TV on 15 November 2021.

== Plot ==
Fitri has to struggle to survive in Jakarta after her dream of getting married ran aground due to the death of her future husband. Fitri's kindness was later paid off by her meeting with Farel; Jakarta man who later fell in love with her.

== Cast ==
=== Main ===
- Tissa Biani as Fitri Rahayu
- Rizky Nazar as Farel Emeraldi Hutama
- Omar Daniel as Aldiansyah Armando/Aldo

=== Recurring ===
- Dimas Anggara as Firmansyah Armando
- Josephine Firmstone as Moza
- Gemi Nastiti as Kayla Saphira Hutama
- Lydia Kandou as Amelia Hutama
- Willem Bevers as Hutama Erlangga
- Jui Purwoto as Norman
- Vonny Anggraini as Bulik
- Deden Bagaskara as Iman Armando
- Sitha Soerjo as Asih
- Yusuf Özkan as Yuga
- Aliyah Khansa as Ratna

=== Special appearances ===
- Talitha Rasika as Farel's Secretary
- TB Alim as Joyo
- Octa Viyanti as The neighbor's mother is jealous
- Fauzan Jagur as Youth hanging out
- Trio Albino as Youth hanging out
- Dedi RBT as Thugs
- Ari Goceng as Snatcher
- Yanti Mbul as study mother
- Redie Irsyad as Photographer
- Melly Saripah as Retno
- Florine Edhita as Lobby reception
- Manoj Punjabi as Mister Mateo
- Iqbaal Ramadhan as watchmaker
- Indri Ade S as Receptionist
- Nana Ken Sepriyanto as Locals
- Rosita Simatupang as Moza's aunt
- Kemal Al Giffari as Cahyo
- Tomy Babap as Asep
- Natasha Manapa as Intan
- Irfan Supriyatna as Ivan
- Rizzi Ahmad as Creative Director
- Filia Farlinanda as Client
- Alika Noer Zahra as Ivan's assistant
- Fitri Cikarang as Assistant creative director
- Aryo Wahab as Vendors
- Ayu Wandira as Maid
- Afan Sanjaya as Retro Security
- Dina Al as Neighbor's mother
- I Kadek Juniarta as Satay waiter
- Dicky Yuro as IT employees
- Anggy Umbara as Advertising director
- Crys Edwards as porridge
- Prima Satria W as Online motorcycle taxi drivers
- Agay Suhandi as Villain
- Ghea Austin Busra as Advertising star
- Chandra Hasibuan as Father who got hit
- Frederik Alexander as Chakra
- Adi Chandra as Gunadi
- Halao Fadlan as Designer
- Ferry Ran as Rano
- Bagus Septiawan as Valet parking
- Vera Octarina as Flowers
- Dicky Otoy as bricklayer
- Bounty Umbara as Peanuts
- Dimas Aditya as Customers
- Indria Desha as Receptionist
- Anugrah Ika as Meisha
- Yans Bewok as Udin
- Aryo Bimo as Waiter
- Renka Surya as Moderator
- Lut Faria as Jury
- Ali Mensan as Deni
- Dewi Ratna as beautiful girl
- Yayan Ruhian as Shopkeeper
- Faiz Vishal as Farel's rented keeper
- Fauzan Tohir as Farel's neighbor
- Ferry Anggriawan as Farel's neighbor
- Navra Sakina Apple as Child Moza
- Faiz Vishal as Meisha's Substitute
- Vista Virmasari as Vela
- Stefanus Otnilla as Artist
- Agam Fajri as Ardi
- Eka Zumrotun as Matoa employees
- Ryzky Milan as Designer
- Indra Gusti as Vito
- Nisrina Artanti as greeter
- Windi Nasir as Driver

== Productions ==
=== Casting ===
Tissa Biani was roped in to play Fitri. Rizky Nazar to play the role of Farel. Omar Daniel was chosen to play Aldo.

=== Promotion ===
The first promo of this series was released on 15 September 2021.

== Soundtrack ==
Atas Nama Cinta by Rossa from Cinta Fitri was recreated for the series with the same title by Tissa Biani.

== Reception ==
This series also successfully became a show that entered the ranks of "trending" in Malaysia and USA.
