= Warkop Reborn: Cricket Boss! =

Warkop DKI Reborn: Jangkrik Boss! Part 1
- Directed by: Anggy Umbara
- Written by: Arie Kriting; Bene; Awwe; Anggy Umbara
- Story by: Anggy Umbara
- Produced by: HB Naveen, Frederica; Indro Warkop (produser eksekutif)
- Starring: Abimana Aryasatya; Vino Bastian; Tora Sudiro
- Production company: Falcon Pictures
- Release date: 8 September 2016
- Running time: 110 minutes
- Country: Indonesia
- Language: Bahasa Indonesia
- Box office: Rp 240 miliar

Warkop Reborn: Cricket Boss! (Warkop DKI Reborn: Jangkrik Boss!), Part One, was a 2016 Indonesian comedy that became the highest-grossing Indonesian language film in history and retained that title for six years. The film, part of the Warkop films franchise, was directed by Anggy Umbara and produced by Falcon Pictures. It starred Abimana Aryasatya, Vino G. Bastian, and Tora Sudiro as three friends who work as security guards in a fictional organization called CHIIPS .

Cricket Boss! was released on September 8, 2016 in cinemas across Indonesia. By the end of its screening, the film had been watched by 6.8 million viewers and displaced the film Laskar Pelangi as the most successful film in Indonesian history. The film was surpassed by KKN di Desa Penari in 2022, which in turn was surpassed by Jumbo in 2025, and Agak Laen: Menyala Pantiku! in 2026.

== Synopsis ==
Dono (Abimana Aryasatya), Kasino (Vino Bastian), and Indro ( Tora Sudiro) work as security guards for the organization CHIIPS (Cara Hebat Ikut Ikutan Pelayanan Sosial or "Great Ways to Participate in Social Services"), but their behavior and reputation for getting into trouble regularly angers their boss, "Mr. Boss" (Ence Bagus), and they have remained on the job after several near-firings. Because the three of them have the worst records of are CHIIPS employees, Mr. Boss brings in Sophie (Hannah Al Rashid), a CHIIPS member from Paris, to help them.

Their first patrol ends badly after they fail to catch a pickpocket (Arie Kriting), damage a local's shop, and cause a fire at a painting exhibition. Dono, Kasino and Indro are arrested, and given a choice by the court to pay reparations of 8 billion rupiah to the victims, or to be imprisoned. Unsure about how to raise the money, they visit Dono's uncle, Mr. Slamet (Tarzan), to borrow cash. He agrees, and gives them a suitcase of money, but when the three friends begin to offer money to their victims, they realize that the cash is actually "play money" and that the recipients think that the three are distributing counterfeit money. Sophie takes pity on them and invites the three to a party. On their way to the occasion, they happen to witness a man (Bene Dion) being struck by a hit-and-run driver. They take the dying man to the hospital, and he hands them a book containing a treasure map.

With Sophie's help, Dono, Kasino and Indro decipher the coded directions on the map, sell their belongings, and go to Malaysia, purported site of the treasure. Upon arriving at the Malaysian airport, however, they realize that what they thought was their luggage was confused with other suitcases. Kasino looks at footage on the airport's closed circuit TV and learns that the group's bags were picked up by a woman dressed in red (Nur Fazura). After chasing her in a taxi to Kuala Lumpur's Chinatown, they lose track of the woman because many women there are also wearing red. The film ends with Indro's announcement to the audience and continues that the story will be continued in the upcoming sequel, Warkop DKI Reborn: Cricket Boss! Part 2 .

== Awards ==
In 2017, Cricket Boss!, Part I, won the Indonesian Choice Awards for movie of the year, and the Indonesian Box Office Movie Awards for Anggy Umbara for Best Director, Abimana Aryasatya for Best Lead Actor, and the Warkop trio of actors (Aryasatya, Bastian and Sudiro) for Best Talent Ensemble.
