= Sebelum 7 Hari =

- Theatrical release poster
- Directed by: Awi Suryadi
- Written by: Widi Lestari; Alim Sudio
- Based on: "Sebelum 7 Hari" (2021)
- Produced by: Manoj Punjabi
- Starring: Agla Artalidia; Anantya Kirana; Sultan Hamonangan; Haydar Salish; Fanny Ghassani; Mian Tiara; Aksara Dena
- Cinematography: Arfian
- Edited by: Vicko Hadi; Firdauzi Trizkiyanto
- Music by: Fajar Yuskemal
- Production company: Pichouse Films
- Release date: January 23, 2025
- Running time: 107 minutes
- Country: Indonesia
- Language: Indonesian Javanese

Sebelum 7 Hari is a 2025 Indonesian supernatural horror film directed by Awi Suryadi and written by Widi Lestari and Alim Sudio based on the 2021 YouTube short of the same name. Presented by MD Pictures and produced by Pichouse Films, the film stars Agla Artalidia, Ananta Rezky Kirana, and Sulthan Hamonangan, and is about a family facing a curse from their recently deceased mother.

The film premiered in Indonesia on 23 January 2025.

== Plot ==
Tari is a mother of two, Bian and Hanif. When Tari was little, her mother Anggun ousted her from the house along with her younger brother Kadar, leaving her with a deep grudge. One day, she received news of her mother dying. Though initially reluctant, she eventually goes to her mother's kampung after being asked by Kadar. Kadar, who has online debts, hopes to find something to pay his debts with. When searching the wardrobe in his mother's house, he finds a land certificate and a sum of cash, which he immediately takes. The next day, Hanif looks for his missing toy car, and finds it beeping under his grandmother's bed. As he's about to take it, Anggun suddenly falls on him and has seizures. Kadar takes Anggun back to bed, but she pukes on him.

After the incident, Kadar calls for Ki Husein, a dukun who had said to Mbok Yati that Anggun is possessed by an evil spirit. He performs a ritual to extract the susuks in Anggun's body. After they are extracted, Anggun suddenly ages into a decayed corpse. Ki Husein tells Kadar to store the susuks to be returned to where they come from. It turns out that Anggun must not be buried normally, but has to be sunk in a cave lake on a Kliwon Thursday, seven days after her death. On the first day, after bathing the corpse, Tari hears Anggun several times saying "Leave now!" in Javanese. That night, Anggun appeared to scare Bian. A few days later, Anggun's figure continues to haunt Bian and Hanif. On the fourth day, Tari goes to the city with Mbok Yati to buy bus tickets for their return trip. Kadar, who is asked to take care of his niece, instead uses the opportunity to go drinking and spending the night with a woman who turns out to be Nyi Rukmosora. The next day, Kadar wakes up in the middle of a cemetery.

On the night of the fifth day, Bian mysteriously performs a ritual with a group of masked women on Anggun's corpse while saying "Do not break the promise" in Javanese. Tari, who can no longer bear everything that has happened, decides to bury Anggun the next day. After the burial was finished, when they return home, Anggun's corpse reappears, filled with flying insects. On the seventh day, they call Ki Husein again, where he guides them to bring Anggun's body to a cave. Ki Husein then performs a ritual and submerges Anggun's body in a small lake inside the cave. That night, Tari wears the mask that Hanif has found earlier. After putting on the mask, she sees her mother's past. Due to a very difficult life, Anggun had once performed a ritual that changed her life but caused her to be cursed because of the susuks inside her. To prevent them from passing on to her children, she drove them away when they were young. Anggun asks Tari to return the susuks that had been removed by Ki Husein back to its original place. Hanif is suddenly lifted and taken by a mysterious force. Tari takes the susuks that Kadar kept to the lake in the cave where they submerged Anggun's corpse. After they return the susuks, Tari asks for Hanif to be returned to her. A voice responds by collecting a promise that Anggun had made. Kadar replies that he is willing to be a sacrifice to fulfill that promise. Shortly after, Hanif emerges from the water, but in exchange, Kadar is pulled into the water. A masked woman then appeares, along with a group of other masked women who hold Kadar in the water. Tari then breaks the mask she is holding, causing the masks of the other women to also break and vanish into the water, followed by the other women who also disappear. Just as everyone thought they were safe, suddenly Kadar was pulled into the water and did not return.

On the 100th day after Anggun's death, a masked woman in white appears in her now-empty house.

== Cast ==
- Agla Artalidia as Tari
- Ananta Rezky Kirana as Bian, Tari's daughter
- Sulthan Hamonangan as Hanif, Tari's son, Bian's younger brother
- Haydar Salish as Kadar, Tari's younger brother
- Fanny Ghassani as Anggun, Tari and Kadar's mother
- Mian Tara as Mbok Yati
- Aksara Dena as Ki Husein, a dukun
- Aurra Kharisma as Nyi Rukmosora

== Production ==
The film is based on the 2021 10-minute YouTube short of the same name which was produced by Pijaru. The short was chosen as basis for a film because it won Best Fiction in ReelOzInd! Australia Indonesia Short Film Competition 2021. For the film, Ghassani and other actors have to learn to sing traditional Javanese songs. The film was shot on several locations, including Magelang, Central Java and a cave in Padalarang, West Java.
