= Risa Saraswati =

Indonesian singer

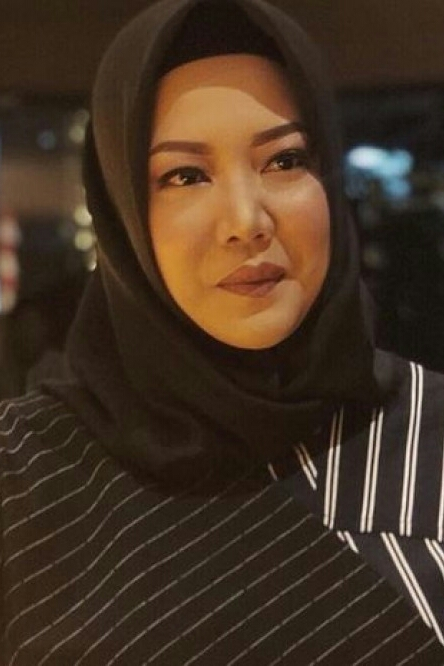
- Born: 24 February 1985 (age 41); Bandung, West Java, Indonesia
- Occupations: Singer; songwriter; author
- Years active: 2002–present
- Spouse: Dimas Tri Adityo (m. 2019)
- Children: Anaking Raga Janari
- Musical career
- Genres: Electronic; indie pop; gospel
- Instrument: Vocals
- Labels: FFWD Records; Demajors
- Website: www.risasaraswati.com

Risa Saraswati Bachelor of Engineering, Master's Degree (born 24 February 1985) is an Indonesian singer, songwriter, author of Sundanese descent and Civil Service from Department of Culture and Tourism in Bandung, West Java. She was a former lead singer and a founding member of Indonesian indie pop group, Homogenic (later known as HMGNC). In 2009, Saraswati announced her resignation as the band's lead singer to form a new band, Sarasvati. In 2012, she writes her debut best-selling book, Danur which spawned three film adaptations.

== Music career ==
Saraswati began involved with music since high school and after graduated, she became seriously active in music. In 2002, Saraswati along with her schoolmate, Dina Dellyana formed Homogenic (named after Icelandic singer Bjork's 1997 album of the same name; renamed HMGNC in 2015), where she took the role as lead singer and Dina playing keyboards and composed music. Grahadea Kusuf joined the band afterwards, wherein he playing synth and composed songs, thus completing the band as a trio. Saraswati produced two albums with the band: Epic Symphony (2004) and Echoes of the Universe (2006).

She left the band in October 2009 after seven years together, but maintains relationship with her former HMGNC bandmates. She was replaced by Amandia Syachridar as the band's new lead singer. Then, she formed her own band, Sarasvati which performs gospel music and has produced five studio albums with the band. In 2017, Saraswati reunited with HMGNC when the band released their eponymous fourth studio album.

== Writing career ==
As a writer, Saraswati mostly focused on horror fiction in her works and widely known for writing mystical stories. In January 2012, she released her debut book, titled Danur containing 214 pages. The success of Danur led to its three film adaptations, wherein Saraswati credited as a screenplay writer.

In January 2020, Jurnal Risa: Teror Liburan Sekolah, a children's story book written by Saraswati, was published.

== Personal life ==
Saraswati married Dimas Tri "Dimasta" Adityo on 15 February 2019. Their first child, Anaking Raga Janari, was born on 15 January 2020.

== Discography ==
=== Homogenic ===
- Epic Symphony (2004)
- Echoes of the Universe (2006)

=== Sarasvati ===
- Story of Peter (2011)
- Mirror (2012)
- Sunyaruri (2013)
- Ballades (2015)
- Ratimaya (2015)

== Filmography ==
=== As screenwriter ===
- Danur (2017)
- Danur 2: Maddah (2018)
- Rasuk (2018)
- Danur 3: Sunyaruri (2019)
- Rasuk 2 (2020)
