= Waktu Maghrib =

- Poster
- Directed by: Sidharta Tata
- Written by: Agasyah Karim; Khalid Kashogi; Bayu Kurnia; Sidharta Tata
- Produced by: Gope T. Samtani
- Starring: Ali Fikry; Bima Sena; Nafiza Fatia Rani; Aulia Sarah
- Cinematography: Ujel Bausad
- Edited by: Greg Arya
- Music by: Fajar Ahadi
- Production companies: Rapi Films; Sky Media
- Distributed by: Rapi Films; CSG Movies
- Release date: 9 February 2023
- Running time: 104 minutes
- Country: Indonesia
- Languages: Indonesian; Javanese

Waktu Maghrib is a 2023 Indonesian horror mystery thriller film directed by Sidharta Tata. The film was produced by Gope T. Samtani with the production company Rapi Films and Sky Media. The film stars Ali Fikry, Bima Sena, and Nafiza Fatia Rani in as lead role. A direct sequel, Waktu Maghrib 2 was released on 28 May 2025.

== Cast ==
- Ali Fikry as Adi
- Bima Sena as Saman Abdullah
- Nafiza Fatia Rani as Ayu
- Andri Mashadi as Karta
- Aulia Sarah as Sri Woro Hadisono
- Taskya Namya as Ningsih
- Sadana Agung as Hansip
- Muhammad Abbe as Village Head
- Sulis Kusuma as the Village Head
- Nasarius as Marto, Ayu's father
- Bambang Paningron as ustaz
- Bebe Gracia as Wati
- Kevin Abani as Samiun
- Malvin JJ as little Karta
- Riyanto as Kasan, Adi's father
- Heru Prasetyo as the Jin Ummu
- Bevan Putra as Drajat

== Release ==
The film was released in Indonesian cinemas on 9 February 2023. It is released on OTT platform Prime Video in July 2023.

== Reception ==
=== Critical reception ===
Reviewed for Safety Wales, Emily Patel praised the Indonesian horror film for its effective use of cultural folklore. Patel noted that the film successfully exploits the traditional Indonesian belief that the Maghrib period is a spiritually sensitive and unsettling time of day. Rather than relying purely on visual jumpscares, the narrative leverages psychological dread and collective memory to establish a tense atmosphere. Patel concluded that by treating this sacred yet feared timeframe as a central, driving force of the plot, the filmmakers demonstrated a nuanced understanding of local cultural contexts, highlighting the strengths of contemporary Indonesian horror.

Reviewed the film for Centre Multi Santé, Dr. Isabelle Gagné highly praised the film for its effective blending of Indonesian folklore, compelling storytelling, and chilling visuals. Gagné commended the film's technical aspects, particularly its practical effects, creature designs, and atmospheric cinematography, which utilized lighting and camera angles to sustain a sense of dread. Additionally, she lauded the convincing and moving performances of the cast, concluding that the movie successfully offers a culturally rich yet widely appealing horror experience that leaves a lasting impression on its audience.

Writing for High On Films, Ahendrila Goswami described, it as an interesting horror film, though she noted that it occasionally feels overly reliant on religious superstition. However, Goswami recommended it as a unique viewing option, concluding that horror audiences looking for something different would not be disappointed. Reviewed for Suara, Ismail attributed the popularity and appeal of Waktu Maghrib to its highly relatable themes, noting that the traditional myths and parental warnings against going outside during the Maghrib period resonate strongly with audiences who grew up with these stories. Additionally, Ismail highlighted the positive critical reception directed toward the performances of the film's young cast members, specifically Ali Fikry, Bima Sena, and Nafiza.
