= Vina: Sebelum 7 Hari =

- Poster
- Directed by: Anggy Umbara
- Screenplay by: Bounty Umbara; Dirmawan Hatta
- Based on: True story of Murder of Muhamad Rizky Rudiana and Vina Dewi Arsita
- Produced by: Dheeraj Kalwani
- Starring: Nayla D. Purnama; Lydia Kandou; Gisellma Firmansyah; Pritt Timothy; Delia Husein
- Cinematography: Dicky R. Maland
- Edited by: Gita Miaji
- Music by: AL
- Production company: Dee Company
- Release date: May 8, 2024 (Indonesia)
- Running time: 100 minutes
- Country: Indonesia
- Language: Indonesian

Vina: Sebelum 7 Hari (International title: Vina: Before 7 Days) is a 2024 Indonesian horror thriller film directed by Anggy Umbara based on the true story of the murder of Vina and Eky. Produced by Dee Company Film, the movie stars Nayla D. Purnama, Lydia Kandou, and Gisellma Firmansyah. Vina: Sebelum 7 Hari premiered in Indonesian theaters on May 8, 2024.

== Synopsis ==
The story begins when Vina and her boyfriend, Eky, are found dead with their bodies in a destroyed state in 2016. Initially, the family thought they had died in a traffic accident. However, many oddities were discovered, leading the police to conduct a further investigation. On the 6th day after Vina and Eky's death, a friend of Vina suddenly contacted Vina's family, asking them to come to her house. During the meeting, Vina's friend suddenly became possessed by Vina's spirit and then narrated the chronology of the event. Vina's spirit revealed that at that time, she and Eky were attacked by 12 motorcycle gang members on the Talun overpass. Vina was then brutally tortured. It was also revealed that Vina was raped by the perpetrator and his accomplices. One of the perpetrators was Egi, who had once had feelings for her.

== Cast ==
- Nayla D. Purnama as Vina Dewi Arsita
- Gisellma Firmansyah as Linda, Vina's best friend
- Pritt Timothy as Vina's grandfather
- Lydia Kandou as Vina's grandmother
- Septian Dwi Cahyo as Wasnadi, Vina's father
- Delia Husein as Marliana, Vina's sister
- Fahad Haydra as Egi
- Yusuf Mahardika as Eky/Muhamad Rizky Rudiana
- Imran Ismail as Dani
- Ridwan Kainan as Hadi
- Aruma Khadijah as Nurul
- Ozan Arkananta as Deden
- Niniek Arum as Hesti
- Cinta Dewi as Linda's mother
- Rio Maland as Egi's father
- Risma Nilawati as Egi's mother
- Alvin Adam as Danang
- Eduward Manalu as AKBP Indra
- Firman Ferdiansyah as Eka Sandi
- Arya Panji as Supriyanto

== Release and reception ==
The film directed by Anggy Umbara was released on May 8, 2024, and immediately garnered 335,812 viewers on its first day. This achievement placed it in the top five highest-grossing Indonesian films on opening day, surpassing KKN di Desa Penari with 315,486 viewers.

The film Vina: Sebelum 7 Hari ended its theatrical run after 41 days, finishing with a total of 5.8 million viewers. This number made it the second highest-grossing Indonesian film of 2024, after Agak Laen.
