= Alas Pati: Hutan Mati =

2018 Indonesian horror film

Alas Pati: Hutan Mati Starch Base: Dead Forest
- Directed by: Jose Poernomo
- Screenplay by: Jose Poernomo; Aviv Elham
- Produced by: Manoj Punjabi
- Starring: Nikita Willy; Jeff Smith; Stefhanie Zamora; Roy Sungkono; Naomi Paulinda; Maura Inry Gabrielle
- Cinematography: Jose Poernomo
- Edited by: Mardiansyah; Aristo Pontoh
- Music by: Ricky Lionardi
- Production companies: MD Pictures; Pichouse Films
- Distributed by: MD Entertainment
- Release date: 24 May 2018 (Indonesia)
- Running time: 82 minutes
- Country: Indonesia
- Language: Indonesian

Alas Pati: Hutan Mati (lit. 'Starch Base: Dead Forest') is a 2018 Indonesian horror film directed by Jose Poernomo and starring Nikita Willy, Jeff Smith, Steffi Zamora, Roy Sungkono, Naomi Paulinda, and Maura Inry Gabrielle. This film focuses on the theme of the "Forest of Death". It was released on May 24, 2018.

== Plot ==
Raya, Dito, Rendy, Vega, and Jessy are five Semester 4 students at the Faculty of Economics who work part time as video blog artists. One day, Raya proposed an idea for a place for their video, namely a forest area called Alas Pati (hutan mati in Javanese). According to legend, Alas Pati is used as a resting place for those who are not allowed to stay in this world or the next, so they are forced to roam this world as ghosts. There, they found a group of bodies which, instead of being buried, had been placed on a bamboo assembly. Raya is attracted to the necklace worn by the corpse and takes it. They then took turns taking selfies until, when it was Jessy's turn, an unfortunate tragedy befell her. The bamboo foundation she was standing on collapsed suddenly so she fell and was impaled by the bamboo and died.

Instead of taking responsibility, Raya, Dito, Rendy, and Vega went straight home and insisted on living their lives as if nothing had happened. In the following days, they were haunted by Jessy's spirit who couldn't go to the next world because her body was left out there. They also invited questions from other people, including Jessy's mother and the Dean, who were aware of Jessy's disappearance. The Dean said that if Jessy was still missing within the next three days, he would contact the police.

The four friends tried to negotiate to resolve this problem, but they ended up blaming each other for responsibility. Vega, who was most traumatized by what happened, decided to commit suicide by jumping from the building. After Raya is almost killed when the car she is driving falls into a river and her necklace is taken by a mysterious spirit, she realizes that she cannot run away from responsibility forever. Together with Dito and Rendy, Raya goes to Alas Pati to give Jessy a proper burial and plans to turn herself in to the authorities the next day, whatever the outcome.

Raya, Dito, and Rendy returned home peacefully, relieved that Jessy's spirit was able to go to the next world. However, when they got home, Dito and Rendy were killed by mysterious spirits. Raya realized that, even though they had calmed Jessy, that did not cover up the fact that they had disturbed the peace of the real inhabitants of Alas Pati. A black creature guarding Alas Pati then came and killed Raya.

== Cast ==
- Nikita Willy as Raya
- Jeff Smith as Dito
- Stefhanie Zamora Husen as Vega
- Roy Sungkono as Rendy
- Naomi Paulinda as Jessy
- Maura Inry Gabrielle as Rika

== Production ==
Poermono stated that his idea was not to make a film that would be too heavy but rather entertaining.

== Release ==
The film has been regularly broadcast on television in the Philippines and has been made available on Netflix since 2021.

== Reception ==
A review at the French website DarkSideReviews stated: "The opening is strong, the finale is nice, and if the entire second act of the film accumulates clichés and obvious choices in terms of bad taste, we cannot say that it is poorly filmed nor poorly photographed. The short duration of the film also works in its favour." Fimela found the film thrilling and spooky and praised the presence of majestic Indonesian scenery.
