= Anggy Umbara =

Indonesian film director

- Born: 21 October 1980 (age 45); Jakarta, Indonesia
- Other name: D'Jackal
- Occupations: Director; screenwriter; film producer; actor; musician; editor; presenter
- Years active: 1994—present
- Spouse: Wita Priyanthi (m. 2006)
- Children: 2
- Parent: Danu Umbara

Anggy Umbara (also known as D'Jackal) is an Indonesian director, screenwriter, film producer, actor, musician, editor, and presenter. Anggy was nominated for the Best Original Screenplay Citra Award for the film 3: Alif Lam Mim at the 2015 Indonesian Film Festival alongside his brothers Bounty Umbara and Fajar Umbara.

== Early life ==
Anggy was born on October 21, 1980, in Jakarta. His father, Danu Umbara, was a director known for his successful film, Lima Cewek Jagoan, in the 1980s. Danu died when Anggy was five years old, leaving the production company Umbara Brothers Film with his mother, Nanny Iskandar, as the production head.

Anggy has six siblings. Some of his older brothers, like Fajar Umbara and Bounty Umbara, also work in the film industry and often collaborate with him under the Umbara Brothers Film production house.

== Career ==
Anggy's career began with directing various music videos and being a DJ in the nu-metal music group Purgatory, with the stage name D'Jackal.

Anggy's first feature film as a director was Mama Cake in 2012. In 2013, he directed Coboy Junior the Movie, and his third film in 2015, Comic 8, spawned two sequels. Anggy also directed and wrote the film 3: Alif Lam Mim. Released in the same year, Anggy was nominated for the Best Original Screenplay Citra Award at the 2015 Indonesian Film Festival for the screenplay he co-wrote with his brothers, Bounty Umbara and Fajar Umbara.

== Filmography ==
=== Films ===
Year	Title	Credited as				Notes
Year	Title	Director	Screenwriter	Producer	Editor	Notes
2005	Gerbang 13	No	Story with Reka Wijaya	No	No	Uncredited
2012	Mama Cake	Yes	Yes	No	Yes	Directorial debut
2013	Coboy Junior the Movie	Yes	No	No	No	
2014	Comic 8	Yes	No	No	No	
2015	Comic 8: Casino Kings Part 1	Yes	Yes	No	No	
2015	3: Alif Lam Mim	Yes	Story and screenplay with Bounty Umbara and Fajar Umbara	Co-producer	Additional editing	
2016	Comic 8: Casino Kings Part 2	Yes	Yes	No	No	
2016	Warkop DKI Reborn: Jangkrik Boss! Part 1	Yes	Story and screenplay with Bene Dion, Arie Kriting, and Awwe	No	No	
2017	Rafathar	No	Story	Yes	No	
2017	Warkop DKI Reborn: Jangkrik Boss! Part 2	Yes	Story & screenplay with Bene Dion, Arie Kriting, and Awwe	No	No	
2017	5 Cowok Jagoan: Rise of the Zombies	Yes	Yes	Co-producer	With Wawan I. Wibowo	
2018	Insya Allah Sah 2	With Bounty Umbara	Screenplay with Herry B. Arissa	No	No	
2018	DOA (Doyok-Otoy-Ali Oncom): Cari Jodoh	Yes	With Fico Fachriza	No	No	
2018	Suzzanna: Bernapas dalam Kubur	With Rocky Soraya	No	No	No	
2019	Satu Suro	Yes	With Syamsul Hadi	No	No	
2019	Mendadak Kaya	Yes	With Iyam Renzia	No	No	
2019	Si Manis Jembatan Ancol	Yes	Screenplay with Isman HS and Fajar Umbara	No	No	
2020	Sabar Ini Ujian	Yes	With Gianluigi Christoikov and Erwin Wu	No	No	
2021	Till Death Do Us Part	Yes	Story and screenplay with Erwin Dhia Falah	No	No	
2021	Devil on Top	Yes	With Rayhan Dharmawan	No	No	
2021	I	Yes	Yes	No	Yes	
2021	Will	Yes	Story	No	No	
2021	Survive	Yes	Yes	No	Yes	
2021	Balada Sepasang Kekasih Gila	Yes	Screenplay with Han Gagas	No	No	
2021	The Watcher	Yes	With David Nurbianto	No	With Bounty Umbara	
2023	Death Knot	No	No	Executive with Cornelio Sunny and Indah Destriana	No	
2023	Khanzab	Yes	Screenplay with Dirmawan Hatta	No	No	
2023	Jin & Jun	Yes	With Rayhan Dharmawan	No	No	
2023	Hitmen	Yes	With Aaron Hart	No	No	
2023	Aku Tahu Kapan Kamu Mati: Desa Bunuh Diri	Yes	No	No	No	
2023	Siksa Neraka	Yes	No	No	No	
2024	Munkar	Yes	No	No	No	
2024	Mukidi	Yes	With Erwin Wu	No	No	
2024	Vina: Sebelum 7 Hari	Yes	No	No	No	
2024	Kromoleo	Yes	No	No	No	
2025	Potret Mimpi Buruk	No	No	Executive with Daniel Agus Susanto, Robin Moran, and Ismail Basbeth	No	
2025	Setetes Embun Cinta Niyala	Yes	No	No	No	Released on Netflix
2026	402 Haunted Korean Hospital	Yes	No	No	No	
2026	Si Manis Jembatan Ancol 2 †	Yes	Story	No	No	

Notes

Not yet released
- TBA : To be announced

=== Web series ===
Year	Title	Role	Notes
2021	Cinta Fitri	Director	
2021—2022	Tersanjung the Series	Director	
2021—2022	Tersanjung the Series	Screenwriter	
2022—2023	Kupu Malam	Director	Also body double for Michelle Ziudith
2023	Princess & the Boss	Director	

=== Television shows ===
Year	Title	Role	Notes
2003	Spontan Gress	Screenwriter	

=== Music videos ===
Year	Title	Performer(s)	Role	Notes
2023	"Cintaku Untukmu"	Dewa Budjana, Fadly, and Putri Ariani	Director	Theme song for the film Hamka & Siti Raham Vol. 2

== Acting credits ==
=== Films ===
Year	Title	Role	Notes
2012	Mama Cake	Thug	
2012	Mama Cake	Siomai vendor	
2014	Comic 8	Police Chief	
2014	Tak Kemal Maka Tak Sayang	Metromini conductor	
2015	CJR the Movie	Show director	
2016	Ada Cinta di SMA	Teacher	
2017	Rafathar	Ondel-ondel	
2018	DOA (Doyok-Otoy-Ali Oncom): Cari Jodoh	Manoj P.	Uncredited
2019	Satu Suro	Publisher	
2020	Sabar Ini Ujian	Jefri	
2021	Till Death Do Us Part	Radio announcer	Voice
2021	Devil on Top	Taichan satay seller	
2021	Backstage	Music video director	
2023	Khanzab	Meatball vendor	
2023	Jin & Jun	Guidance counselor	
2023	Hitmen	Restaurant customer	Uncredited
2023	Hitmen	Sniper	Uncredited
2024	Siksa Kubur	Narrator	Voice; only in trailer
2024	Mukidi		Uncredited

=== Web series ===
Year	Title	Role	Notes
2020	Twisted	Himself	Episode 8
2021	Cinta Fitri	Commercial director	Episode 5
2022	Kupu Malam	Courier Raffi	Episode 6

== Awards and nominations ==
Year	Award	Category	Work	Result
2015	Indonesian Film Festival	Best Original Screenplay Citra Award	3: Alif Lam Mim	Nominated
2015	Maya Awards	Best Director	3: Alif Lam Mim	Nominated
2015	Maya Awards	Best Original Screenplay	3: Alif Lam Mim	Nominated
2016	Bandung Film Festival	Commendable Director of Cinema Film	3: Alif Lam Mim	Won
2016	Bandung Film Festival	Commendable Screenwriter of Cinema Film	3: Alif Lam Mim	Nominated
2016	Indonesian Movie Actors Awards	Best Ensemble	3: Alif Lam Mim	Nominated
2016	Indonesian Box Office Movie Awards	Best Director	Comic 8: Casino Kings Part 1	Nominated
2016	Indonesian Box Office Movie Awards	Best Screenwriter (with Fajar Umbara)	Comic 8: Casino Kings Part 1	Nominated
2017	Indonesian Box Office Movie Awards	Best Director	Comic 8: Casino Kings Part 2	Nominated
2017	Indonesian Box Office Movie Awards	Best Screenwriter (with Fajar Umbara)	Comic 8: Casino Kings Part 2	Nominated
2017	Indonesian Box Office Movie Awards	Best Director	Warkop DKI Reborn: Jangkrik Boss! Part 1	Nominated
2017	Indonesian Box Office Movie Awards	Best Film Trailer	Warkop DKI Reborn: Jangkrik Boss! Part 1	Won
2017	Indonesian Box Office Movie Awards	Best Screenwriter (with Awwe, Bene Dion Rajagukguk, and Arie Kriting)	Warkop DKI Reborn: Jangkrik Boss! Part 1	Nominated
2017	Indonesian Choice Awards	Movie of The Year	Warkop DKI Reborn: Jangkrik Boss! Part 1	Won
2018	Indonesian Box Office Movie Awards	Best Director	Warkop DKI Reborn: Jangkrik Boss! Part 2	Nominated
2018	Indonesian Box Office Movie Awards	Best Screenwriter (with Awwe, Bene Dion Rajagukguk, and Arie Kriting)	Warkop DKI Reborn: Jangkrik Boss! Part 2	Nominated
2018	Indonesian Choice Awards	Movie of The Year	Warkop DKI Reborn: Jangkrik Boss! Part 2	Nominated
2020	Maya Awards	Best Original Screenplay	Sabar Ini Ujian	Nominated
2021	Indonesian Film Journalists Awards	Best Director	Sabar Ini Ujian	Won
2021	Indonesian Film Journalists Awards	Best Screenwriter	Sabar Ini Ujian	Won
2021	Indonesian Film Journalists Awards	Best Director	Survive	Nominated
2021	Indonesian Film Journalists Awards	Best Screenwriter	Survive	Nominated
2021	Indonesian Movie Actors Awards	Best Ensemble	Sabar Ini Ujian	Nominated
2021	Indonesian Movie Actors Awards	Favorite Film	Sabar Ini Ujian	Nominated
