= Hiroaki Katō =

Japanese singer-songwriter, TV presenter, writer, and actor (born 1983)

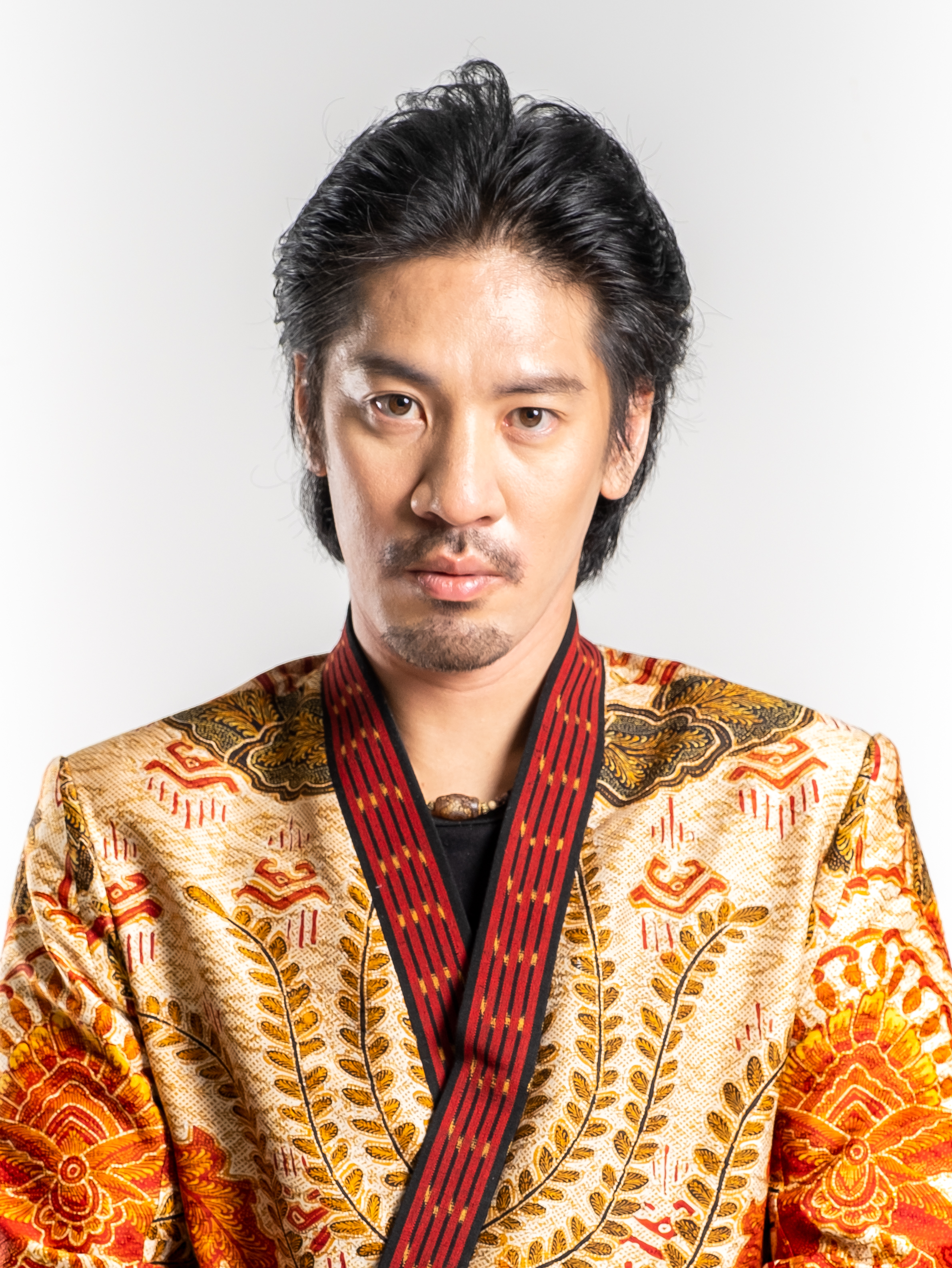
- Hiro in 2021
- Born: March 9, 1983 (age 43); Tokyo, Japan
- Occupations: Singer-songwriter; TV presenter; writer; actor
- Years active: Since 2005
- Spouse: Arina Ephipania (m. 2019)
- Musical career
- Genres: Indonesian pop; J-pop
- Label: Yoshimoto Kreatif Indonesia

Hiroaki Katо̄ (加藤ひろあき, Katо̄ Hiroaki, born March 9, 1983), known by his stage name Hiro, is a Japanese singer, actor, songwriter, TV presenter, radio host, Indonesian language lecturer, and translator who is active in Indonesia. He is known for his love for Indonesia, which he expresses through his works.

== Early life ==
Hiroaki Katō was born in Tokyo, Japan on March 9, 1983. His interest in Indonesia began when he read the novel This Earth of Mankind by Pramoedya Ananta Toer while studying language at the Tokyo University of Foreign Studies. Inspired by the novel, Hiro was determined to learn the Indonesian language. He later had the opportunity to participate in an exchange program to the Universitas Gadjah Mada (UGM) in Yogyakarta in 2006. During his time in Yogyakarta, he lived in a boarding house and experienced life as a student in Indonesia. He claimed he had no difficulty adapting to the Yogyakarta environment because, according to him, Indonesians have many similarities with Japanese people, such as their staple food, rice.

In the same year, the Yogyakarta earthquake occurred and Hiro participated in relief activities for the victims. He helped distribute relief goods and entertain the victims by playing guitar and singing.

== Career ==
Hiroaki Katō started his music career in Japan in 2005. In 2006, he delved deeper into Indonesian music, especially after becoming acquainted with the band Letto in Yogyakarta. He began translating Letto's songs into Japanese, including the song Ruang Rindu. The translation process took quite a long time as Hiro was still in the process of learning Indonesian.

In 2010, he released his first mini-album titled Terima Kasih. The album contained Japanese songs with the phrase "thank you" in each song as an effort to introduce the Indonesian language in Japan.

In 2011, after completing his studies at UGM, Hiro returned to Japan and became an Indonesian language lecturer at Sophia University and Oberlin University. He also actively performed at various cafes in Japan, performing Indonesian songs he had translated.

In 2013, together with Shintarō Fukutake, he translated the novel The Rainbow Troops by Andrea Hirata into Japanese with the title 虹の少年たち (Niji no Shо̄nentachi). In the same year, he also collaborated with singer Meda Kawu to work on songs by Andrea Hirata.

In 2014, Hiro decided to move to Jakarta and focus on developing his career in Indonesia. He was inspired by Tantri from the band KotaK, who encouraged him to pursue a career in Indonesia. He felt it was easier to become a musician in Indonesia compared to Japan.

In 2017, Hiro released the single Buatmu Tertawa, which he sang with Arina, the vocalist of the band Mocca. The song conveys a positive message to always smile in facing the ups and downs of life. In the same year, he released his first album titled Hiroaki Kato. The album contained 10 songs, including Buatmu Tertawa, Ruang Rindu featuring Noe from Letto, and Nada Sousou featuring Arina from Mocca.

Hiroaki Katō is also known as the presenter of the television program Indonesia Banget on RTV. In the program, he introduced various unique things about Indonesia from a Japanese perspective.

In addition, Hiro actively collaborates with other Indonesian musicians, such as Tulus, Kikan Namara, Arda "Naff", and Mike Mohede. Ia He has also acted in the film Ivanna.

In 2022, Hiro released the song 39 ~Sankyu~ which tells the story of his experience overcoming depression during the COVID-19 pandemic and his gratitude to the people who helped him recover. He also released the song Tidak Apa-apa, which was inspired by his admiration for the positive attitude and warmth of Indonesians.

== Personal life ==
Hiroaki Katō married Arina Ephipania Simangunsong, the vocalist of the band Mocca, on February 22, 2019 in Tokyo, Japan. The wedding was simple and only attended by Hiro's family. Arina's family was unable to attend the wedding due to it being a weekday.

In June 2023, Hiroaki Katō had the opportunity to meet with the Emperor of Japan, Naruhito, and Empress Masako during their state visit to Indonesia. During the meeting, Hiro discussed with the Emperor and Empress his reasons for creating songs in three languages: Japanese, Indonesian, and English, as well as his love for Indonesia.

== Filmography ==
=== Films ===
Year	Title	Role	Notes
2022	Ivanna	Matsuya	
2024	The Shadow Strays	Kenjiro	

=== Short films ===
Year	Title	Role	Notes
2006	Harap Tenang, Ada Ujian!		

=== Web series ===
Year	Title	Role	Notes
2022	Scandal 2: Love, Sex &amp; Revenge	Mr. Yagami	
2023	Name for a Band the Series	Musisi	

=== Television programs ===
- Indonesia Banget (2014)
- Quiz Surprize Japan (2015)
- Roaming (2015)
- JI-PHORIA (2018, 2019)
- Sekai Kurabetemitara (2021)
- HIROSENSEI (2020, 2022, 2023)

== Discography ==
=== Albums ===
- Hiroaki Kato (2017)

=== Singles ===
- "Ruang Rindu" (2014)
- "Terima Kasih" (2017)
- "Minami Kaze" (2017)
- "Buatmu Tertawa" (2017)
- "Jakarta Sunset" (2017)
- "Nada Sousou" (2018)
- "Ruang Rindu" (2018, with Noe)
- "Beda Selera" (2019)
- "My Everything"
- "Nada Sousou" (2018, with Arina Ephipania)
- "Bright As The Sun Japanese Version" (2018)
- "Meraih Bintang Japanese Version "Hoshi wo Tsukame"" (2018)
- "Song of Victory ver. Japanese "Shori no Uta"" (2018)
- "Bahagia itu Sederhana ~ Shiawase wa Yattekuru" (2019)
- "Happy!" (2021)
- "Super Human (Japanese Version)" (2021, with Andrea Turk)
- "39~Sankyu~" (2022)
- "Tidak Apa-Apa" (2022)
- "Satu Hati" (2022)
- "Laskar Pelangi" (2022, with Maizura)
- "Saa Ikou! (2023, with Ayana Shahab)

== Published works ==
=== Books ===
- Niji No Shounen Tachi (2013)
- Koohi No Tetsugaku
- Poupelle of Chimney Town: Petualangan Poupelle di Kota Cerobong Asap (2022)

== Awards and nominations ==
Year	Award	Category	Nominated work	Result
2023	Maya Awards	Rookie Actor of the Year	Ivanna	Nominated
