= Danur =

2017 film by Awi Suryadi

Danur: I Can See Ghosts
- Theatrical release poster
- Directed by: Awi Suryadi
- Written by: Lele Laila; Ferry Lesmana; Risa Saraswati
- Produced by: Dian Sasmita Faisal
- Starring: Prilly Latuconsina; Sandrinna Michelle; Shareefa Daanish; Kinaryosih; Indra Brotolaras; Inggrid Widjanarko
- Cinematography: Adrian Sugiono
- Edited by: Firdauzi Trizkiyanto
- Music by: Ricky Lionardi
- Production company: Pichouse Films
- Distributed by: MD Pictures; Dee Company
- Release date: 30 March 2017
- Country: Indonesia
- Language: Indonesian
- Box office: US$9.23 million

Danur (subtitled I Can See Ghosts internationally) is a 2017 Indonesian horror film directed by Awi Suryadi and written by Lele Laila, starring Prilly Latuconsina, Shareefa Daanish, Wesley Andrew in lead roles. The film's story is adapted from a novel written by Risa Saraswati and is based on a friendship between ghosts and humans. It is the highest-grossing Indonesian horror movie and has led to two sequels, Danur 2: Maddah and Danur 3: Sunyaruri. Three spin-offs, Asih (2018), Silam (2018), Asih 2 (2020) and Ivanna (2022), have also been released.

== Plot ==
Risa Saraswati is a girl who lives with her rich and busy mother Elly, who works as a teacher. Her father, meanwhile, works overseas, and only visits once every six months. She is displayed as an introvert due to the miserable broken home she lives in. Her mother does not celebrate her eighth birthday. Thus, she celebrates it herself, wishing for new friends to cope with her loneliness. Suddenly, she hears a boy singing "Boneka Abdi," a Sundanese song that is claimed to be an invitation for ghosts. She then sees a group of Indonesian-speaking Dutch children: Peter, Janshen, and William, who died during the Japanese occupation of the Dutch East Indies and can only be seen by Risa. Upon request by Elly, the shamanist Asep explains to Risa that her ability is due to another ability to smell danur, the scent of the dead. Gaslighted, she sees the kids in their dead forms, scaring her and prompting her to forget about them.

Nine years later, Risa goes back to her childhood house with her little sister Riri and cousin Andri, assigned by Elly, now overseas, to take care of her dying grandmother until a nurse arrives. Whilst playing around the house, Riri discovers a ficus tree once warned to Risa by the kids to never approach it. That night, nurse Asih arrives at the house, and Risa starts feeling suspicious towards her, especially after she gets along with Riri instantly. Andri says that he is unable to see Asih, concluding that Asih is a ghost. Amidst a supernatural sabotage, Asih kidnaps Riri, and attacks Risa's grandmother and Andri, knocking them unconscious. Risa calls Elly and reports Asih's malice. She later plays "Boneka Abdi" on her dusty piano, bringing the kids back, who travel with Risa to the spiritual realm, where Asih drowns Riri in the bathtub. Simultaneously, Elly meets Asep, who tells her that Asih was a woman who committed suicide after killing her newborn baby produced through zina. Asih's spirit roams around the world, searching for children that can replace her murdered child. By placing Asih's comb in the ficus tree and stabbing its roots, Risa and the kids succeed in rescuing Riri.

The next day, everyone moves away from the house. However, Risa insists that she will never forget her ghost friends. Later, a girl finds Asih's comb, and it is hinted that Asih's spirit is reawakened.

== Cast ==
- Prilly Latuconsina as Risa Saraswati
  - Asha Kenyeri Bermudez as young Risa
- Sandrinna Michelle Skornicki as Riana "Riri" Saraswati
- Shareefa Daanish as Asih
- Indra Brotolaras as Andri
- Kinaryosih as Ely Saraswati
- Inggrid Widjanarko as Nenek Saraswati
- Wesley Andrew as William Van Kemmen
- Kevin Bzezovski Taroreh as Jantje Heinrich Janshen
- Gamaharitz as Peter Van Gils
- Fuad Idris as Ujang
- Aline Adita as Psychologist
- Jose Rizal Manua as Mr. Asep

== Awards and nominations ==
Award	Date of ceremony	Category	Recipient(s)/Nominee(s)	Result	Ref.
Indonesian Box Office Movie Awards	March 23, 2018	Best Box Office Movie	Danur: I Can See Ghosts	Nominated	
Indonesian Box Office Movie Awards	March 23, 2018	Best Actress in a Leading Role	Prilly Latuconsina	Nominated	
Indonesian Box Office Movie Awards	March 23, 2018	Best Actress in a Supporting Role	Shareffa Daanish	Nominated	
Indonesian Box Office Movie Awards	March 23, 2018	Best Director	Awi Suryadi	Nominated	
Indonesian Box Office Movie Awards	March 23, 2018	Best Screenwriter	Lele Laila, Ferry Lesmana	Nominated	
Indonesian Box Office Movie Awards	March 23, 2018	Best Movie Trailer	Danur: I Can See Ghosts	Nominated	
Indonesian Box Office Movie Awards	March 23, 2018	Best Ensemble Talent	Prilly Latuconsina, Indra Brotolaras	Nominated	
Indonesian Box Office Movie Awards	March 23, 2018	Top 10 Box Office Movie of 2017	Danur: I Can See Ghosts	Won	
