= HMGNC (album) =

Studio album by HMGNC
- Released: October 2, 2017 (Digital); October 30, 2017 (Physical)
- Genre: Electronic
- Length: 40:11
- Languages: Indonesian, English
- Label: demajors

HMGNC chronology
Let's Talk (2012)	HMGNC (00000000)

Singles from HMGNC
- 1. "Today and Forever" Released: 2015; 2. "Memories That Last a Dream" Released: 2015; 3. "This Too Shall Pass" Released: 2016; 4. "Buka Hati Buka Kembali" Released: 2017; 5. "Sedikit Waktu" Released: 2018

HMGNC is the fifth studio album by Indonesian pop band HMGNC, released on October 2, 2017. The album saw the band reunited with its former lead vocalist, Risa Saraswati who left the band in 2009 to pursue her solo career. This is the band’s first album to adopt the HMGNC name since the band changed their name in 2015.

== Track listing ==
All tracks are written by HMGNC.

No.	Title	Length
1.	"Prelude"	3:06
2.	"Buka Hati Buka Kembali"	3:50
3.	"Sedikit Waktu"	3:52
4.	"Today and Forever"	3:25
5.	"Memories That Last a Dream"	4:09
6.	"Delusional"	6:00
7.	"This Too Shall Pass" (feat. Agung Burgerkill)	4:01
8.	"Constant Wave of Emotions"	4:15
9.	"Kisah Kita"	4:30
10.	"Constant Wave of Emotions - Fundamental"	4:03
Total length:		40:00

== Personnel ==
- Amanda Syachridar - vocals
- Dina Dellyana - synth, programming
- Grahadea Kusuf - synth, programming
- Agung Burgerkill - guest guitars

== Release history ==
Region	Date	Label	Format(s)
Indonesia	October 2, 2017 (Digital); October 30, 2017 (Physical)	Demajors Records	CD, digital download, online streaming
