= Gasing Tengkorak =

2017 Indonesian horror thriller film

- Directed by: Jose Poernomo
- Screenplay by: Jose Poernomo; Baskoro Adi Wuryanto
- Story by: Jose Poernomo
- Produced by: Manoj Punjabi; Dheeraj Kalwani
- Starring: Nikita Willy; Rendi Bragi; Voke Victoria; Aswin Fabanyo; Farahdiba Ferreira; Vebby Palwinta; Diva Azaria; Edi Riza
- Cinematography: Jose Poernomo
- Edited by: Romario; Denny Rihardie; Aristo Pontoh
- Music by: Ricky Lionardi
- Production companies: Dee Company; MD Pictures; Pichouse Films
- Distributed by: Prime Video
- Release date: 2 November 2017 (Indonesia)
- Running time: 80 minutes
- Country: Indonesia
- Language: Indonesian

Gasing Tengkorak (lit. 'Skull Top') is a 2017 Indonesian horror thriller film directed by Jose Poernomo. The film stars Nikita Willy, Rendi Khrisna, Voke Victoria, Aswin Fabanyo, Farahdiba Ferreira, Vebby Palwinta, Diva Azaria, and Edi Riza. The film was released on November 2, 2017.

== Plot ==
Gasing Tengkorak, a mystical game rooted in the Minangkabau culture, tells the story of Veronica, a popular top diva. Suddenly collapsing during a concert, Veronica abruptly cancels her tour and seeks solace in a secluded haven, far from the clamoring crowds.

Michael, Veronica's manager, secures a luxurious and expansive villa, offering Veronica a tranquil escape. Initially, Veronica finds peace and contentment in her solitude. However, supernatural disturbances soon plague her existence, centered around a sinister object: the Gasing Tengkorak.

As the top spins, the restless spirit of a child manifests, terrorizing Veronica's mind and soul. Unbeknownst to her, someone has deliberately unleashed the Gasing Tengkorak to inflict harm. Driven by a thirst for answers, Veronica delves deeper into the mystery surrounding the top, unwittingly intensifying the perilous forces she faces.

== Cast ==
- Nikita Willy as Veronica
- Rendi Bragi as Michael
- Voke Victoria as Tania
- Aswin Fabanyo as Papa Veronica
- Farahdiba Ferreira as Psychiatrist
- Vebby Palwinta as Nadin
- Diva Azaria as Little Veronica
- Melly as Melissa

== Production ==
The film is Nikita Willy's first horror film.

== Reception ==
Antara News commented: "Horror is present from the start of the film, which lasts less than two hours. The appearance of supernatural creatures along with sound effects that create a typically horrific tense atmosphere can make your adrenaline rise occasionally..."
