= Nikita Willy =

Indonesian singer

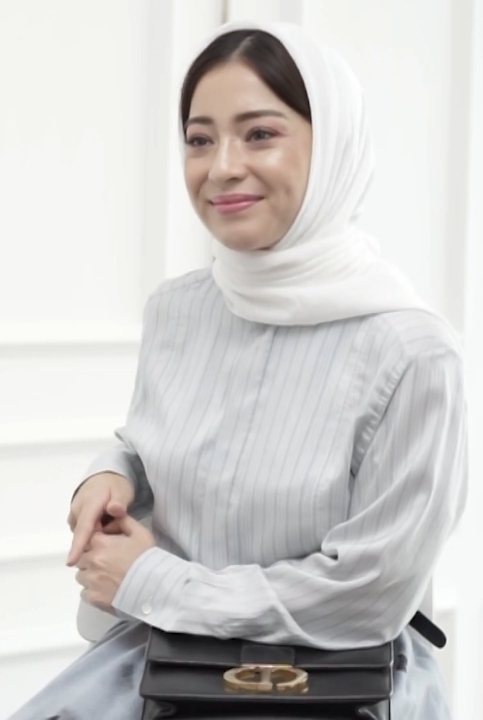
- Nikita Willy in 2020
- Born: Nikita Purnama Willy; June 29, 1994 (age 32); Jakarta, Indonesia
- Occupations: Celebrity; Model; Singer
- Years active: 2000–present
- Known for: Bulan dan Bintang
- Relatives: Titi Handayani (sister-in-law)

Nikita Purnama Willy (born June 29, 1994) is an Indonesian actress, model and singer of Minangkabau descent.

== Early life ==
Nikita Purnama Willy was born on June 29, 1994, in Jakarta.

== Career ==
Nikita Willy started her career as an advertising model. In 2000, she had the opportunity to star in her first soap operas titled Jin dan Jun. She then returned to playing in the soap operas Hari Potret and Ratu Malu and Jendral Kancil.

In 2003, she appeared in the soap opera entitled Bulan dan Bintang. She received offers to play in a number of television soap operas, such as Habibi dan Habibah, Roman Picisan, Nikita, and Safa dan Marwah. She had earned the nickname "Queen of Indonesian soap operas" with the highest paid. Not only in the world of soap operas, she also played in a number of FTV and films. She also plunged into the world of singing. Her better-known singles include "Kutetap Menanti" (2010) and "Lebih Dari Indah" (2011).

In 2012, Nikita Willy hosted the Nickelodeon Indonesia Kids' Choice Awards. In 2014 she became a director and worked on two television movies, Romeo dan Juliet Dipinggir Kali and Pacar Sewaan.

Nikita Willy trained in mixed martial arts and fitness in the United States.

On her lavish 17th birthday party in 2011, she was given a new Cadillac with a value of Rp 3.4 billion (US$397,800) as a present from her parents. Keith Martin was also invited and sang several songs with her.

She has chosen her career in showbiz over education, as she dropped out of school in 2011. But on 13 April 2019, Nikita Willy got a bachelor's degree in law from Sekolah Tinggi Ilmu Hukum "Iblam".

== Personal life ==
Nikita Willy got engaged to Indra Priawan, the son of Chandra Suharto and Karlina Damiri, on 25 July 2020, and they were married on 16 October 2020. They married using Minangkabau custom from West Sumatera. Priawan's grandmother, Mutiara Siti Fatimah, is the owner of the Indonesian taxi company, Blue Bird Group, and he is the third generation of this company alongside his sibling and cousins.

In 2008, she performed in Fajar Bustomi's Bestfriend, starring in the lead role.

She is related to the Indonesian Titi Handayani, who is married to Adrianto Djokosoetono, her husband's cousin.

In her second film in 2008, MBA (Married By Accident), Nikita Willy portrayed the character of Olivia (Ole).

Nikita Willy gave birth to her first son, Issa Xander Djokosoetono, on April 7, 2022, at Cedars-Sinai Medical Center, Los Angeles, United States.

Nikita Willy announced that she had given birth to her second son, Nael Idrissa Djokosoetono, on December 15, 2024. She only conveyed this happy news two days later. She chose the water birth method, at Los Angeles, United States.

== Filmography ==
Title	Year	Role	Production house
Bestfriend?	2008	Tania	MD Pictures
MBA (Married By Accident)	2008	Olivia (Ole)	Multivision Plus
From London to Bali	2017	Putu	Starvision Plus
Total Chaos	2017	Rosa	DePetalz Pictures
Gasing Tengkorak	2017	Veronica	MD Pictures and Dee Company
Alas Pati: Hutan Mati	2018	Raya	MD Pictures
Terlalu Tampan	2019	Amanda	Visinema Pictures
Rasuk 2	2020	Isabela	Dee Company and Blue Water Films

=== Web series ===
Title	Year	Role	Production house	Channel
Satu Amin Dua Iman	2021	Aisyah	MD Entertainment	WeTV & Iflix

== Television ==
Title	Year	Role	Notes
Jin dan Jun	2000	Titut	Guest star, Soap opera
Hari Potret	2002	Sherina	Soap opera
Ratu Malu dan Jenderal Kecil	2002	Ratu Pelangi	Soap opera
Bulan dan Bintang	2003	Bintang	Soap opera
Si Cecep	2004	Nikita Willy	Soap opera
Senyuman Ananda	2005	Julia	Soap opera
Habibi dan Habibah	2005	Young Habibah	Soap opera
Indahnya Karuniamu	2006	Young Noni	Soap opera
Pengantin Kecil	2007	Cheril	Soap opera
Roman Picisan	2007	Chika	Soap opera
Perjaka Manis Jatuh Cinta	2007	Vera	Television film
Ratu Cinta Kilat	2007	Farah	Television film
Pacar Yang Lupa Punya Pacar	2007	Rani	Television film
Kalau Desi Kesandung Cinta	2007	Desi	Television film
Gue Kartini Bukan Kartono	2007	Kartini	Television film
Pacarin Gue Kalo Berani	2007	Vida	Television film
Cowok Loe Cowok Gue Juga	2007	Anika	Television film
Rubiah	2008	Rubiah	Soap opera
Setinggi Bintang	2008	Young Binar	Soap opera
Safa dan Marwah	2009	Safa	Soap opera
Nikita	2009	Nikita Willy	Soap opera
Cinta Dan Anugerah	2009	Nikita Willy	Guest star, soap opera
Sejuta Cinta Marshanda	2010	Nikita Willy	Guest star, soap opera
Mister Olga	2010	Rika	Soap opera
Putri Yang Ditukar	2011	Amira	Soap opera
Yusra dan Yumna	2012	Yusra and Yumna	Soap opera
Kutunggu Kau di Pasar Minggu	2012	Niki Mihardja	Soap opera
Surat Kecil Untuk Tuhan The Series	2013	Keke	Soap opera
Perempuan di Pinggir Jalan	2013	Nita	TV movie
Dua Wanita Cantik	2013	Meta	TV movie
Rindu	2013	Rindu	TV movie
Kado Ramadhan	2013	Bilqis	TV movie
Kau Yang Berasal Dari Bintang	2014	Vania Vanilla	Soap opera
Kau Seputih Melati	2015	Nita	Soap opera
Istri	2015	Dahlia	TV movie
7 Hari Cinta	2015	Andien	TV movie
Pembantu Cantik Gagal Mudik	2016	Dinda	Television film
Girls Night Out	2016	Herself (host)	Talk Show
Julaiha Princess Betawi	2016	Julaiha	Soap opera
Naila	2016	Naila	Soap opera
Pacar Sewaan	2017	Rianti	Also director, TV movie
Serenada Cinta Nadhira	2017	Nadhira	TV movie
Dua Wanita Cantik	2017	Alena	Soap opera
Tiada Hari Yang Tak Indah	2018	Kemuning	Soap opera
Cinta Buta	2019	Aulia Safina	Soap opera
Cinta Nikita	2021	Nikita Willy	Soap opera

== Discography ==
=== Albums ===
Title	Details	Notes
Lebih Dari Indah	Released: October 10, 2012; Label: Glow Music, Music Factory Indonesia; Formats: CD, digital download, streaming	Studio album
The Freaks	Released: May 12, 2016; Label: Glow Music, Target Pop, Jagonya Music & Sport Indonesia; Formats: CD, digital download, streaming	Compilation album
Hidayah	Released: June 6, 2016; Label: Royal Prima Musikindo, Bumi Entertainment; Formats: digital download, streaming	Compilation album

=== Singles ===
Title	Year	Album
Keyakinan Hati	2009	Hidayah
Kutetap Menanti	2010	Lebih Dari Indah
Lebih Dari Indah	2011	Lebih Dari Indah
Maafkan	2012	Lebih Dari Indah
Akibat Pernikahan Dini	2012	Lebih Dari Indah
Luka Feat Vonny Cornelia	2012	Lebih Dari Indah
Nonton Bioskop	2012	Lebih Dari Indah
Bohong	2012	Lebih Dari Indah
Cinta Putih	2012	Lebih Dari Indah
Pantas Untukku Feat Oscar Mahendra	2012	Lebih Dari Indah
Tafakur	2012	Lebih Dari Indah
Surat Kecil Untuk Tuhan	2013	Surat Kecil Untuk Tuhan The Series Soundtrack
Andai Kau Bisa Mengerti	2016	The Freaks
Blowed (featuring RBA)	2016	Non-album singles
Angin	2017	Dua Wanita Cantik Soundtrack

=== Collaboration ===
- "Can I stay" (2003) – Theme Song of Ratu Pelangi, sinetron Ratu Malu dan Jendral Kancil
- "Pantun Nasihat" (2004) – feat Sulton Max, Dika F.
- "Doa Keselamatan" (2004) – feat Sulton Max, Dika F.
- "Doa di Waktu Pagi" (2004) – feat Sulton Max, Dika F.
- "Doa Ayah Bunda" (2004) – feat Sulton Max, Novi, Dika F.
- "Doa Sebelum dan Sesudah Makan" (2004) – feat Sulton Max, Novi, Dika F.
- "Mamaku" (2006) – feat Cindy Valerie
- "Jatuh Cinta Tak Ada Logika" (2015) – feat Aliando Syarief, Teuku Rassya, Calvin Jeremy, Agnez Mo
- "Bahagia dengan Cinta" (2016) – feat Aliando Syarief, Teuku Rassya, Calvin Jeremy

== Awards and nominations ==
Year	Award	Category	Nominated work	Result
2003	Indonesian Asian Star	Kid of the Year	Bulan dan Bintang	Nominated
2004	SCTV Awards 2004	Most Popular Child Actress	Si Cecep	Nominated
2010	2010 Panasonic Gobel Awards	Favorite Actress	Nikita	Won
2010	Telkomsel	Best Celebrity Mobile Content of Telkomsel	—N/a	Won
2010	2010 Festival Film Bandung	Best Actress – Sinetron	Safa dan Marwah	Nominated
2010	2010 Nickelodeon Indonesia Kids Choice Awards	Favorite Female Actress	Safa dan Marwah	Won
2011	2011 Dahsyatnya Awards	Newcomer Singer	Ku Tetap Menanti	Nominated
2011	2011 Panasonic Gobel Awards	Favorite Actress	Putri Yang Ditukar	Won
2011	2011 Nickelodeon Indonesia Kids Choice Awards	Favorite Female Actress	Putri Yang Ditukar	Won
2011	2011 Nickelodeon Indonesia Kids Choice Awards	Indonesian Star Wannabe	—N/a	Won
2012	2012 Dahsyatnya Awards	Female Singer	—N/a	Nominated
2012	2012 Panasonic Gobel Awards	Favorite Actress	Putri Yang Ditukar	Nominated
2012	2012 Nickelodeon Indonesia Kids Choice Awards	Female Favorite Actress	Putri Yang Ditukar	Won
2012	Gadis Awards	Tersiksa	—N/a	Won
2012	2012 Yahoo! OMG Awards	Hottest Scandal "(with Diego Michiels)"	—N/a	Nominated
2013	2013 Dahsyatnya Awards	Best Song	Maafkan	Nominated
2013	2013 Dahsyatnya Awards	Female Singer	Maafkan	Nominated
2013	2013 Panasonic Gobel Awards	Favorite Actress	Kutunggu Kau di Pasar Minggu	Nominated
2013	2013 Nickelodeon Indonesia Kids Choice Awards	Female Favorite Actress	Kutunggu Kau di Pasar Minggu	Nominated
2013	2013 Yahoo! OMG Awards	Most Wanted Female	—N/a	Nominated
2013	2013 Yahoo! OMG Awards	Favorite Couple (with Diego Michiels)	—N/a	Nominated
2014	2014 Panasonic Gobel Awards	Favorite Actress	Surat Kecil Untuk Tuhan The Series	Won
2014	2014 Indonesia Kids Choice Awards	Favorite Actress	Surat Kecil Untuk Tuhan The Series	Nominated
2014	HighEnd's 22 Indonesia's Beautiful Women	22 Indonesia's Beautiful Women	—N/a	Won
2015	2015 Global Seru Awards	Favorite Actress	—N/a	Nominated
2015	2015 Insert Awards	Social media	—N/a	Nominated
2016	2016 Indonesian Television Awards	Most Popular Actress	Kau Seputih Melati	Nominated
2016	2016 Insert Awards	Fit & Fabulous Female Celebrity	—N/a	Won
2016	2016 SCTV Awards	Most Popular Female Lead	Naila	Nominated
2017	2017 Infotainment Awards	Most Fashionable Female Celebrity	—N/a	Nominated
2017	2017 SCTV Awards	Most Popular Soundtrack	Angin – Dua Wanita Cantik	Nominated
2019	2019 Indonesian Television Awards	Most Popular Actress	Cinta Buta	Nominated
2019	2019 Festival Film Bandung	Best Actress	Cinta Buta	Nominated
2019	2019 Panasonic Gobel Awards	Favorite Actress	Cinta Buta	Nominated
2019	2019 SCTV Awards	Most Popular Female Lead	Cinta Buta	Nominated
2019	2019 SCTV Awards	Most Social Media Artist	—N/a	Nominated
2020	Kiss Awards 2020	Princess Terkiss	—N/a	Nominated
2020	Kiss Awards 2020	Wedding Terkiss (with Indra Priawan)	Couple	Nominated
2021	Festival Film Bandung 2021	Best Actress	Cinta Nikita	Nominated
2022	Infotainment Awards 2022	Gorgeous Mom	—N/a	Nominated
