= 5 Detik dan Rasa Rindu =

2023 Indonesian romantic-drama musical streaming television series

- Genre: Drama; Romantic; Musical
- Created by: Manoj Punjabi
- Based on: 5 Detik dan Rasa Rindu by Prilly Latuconsina
- Directed by: Monty Tiwa
- Starring: Prilly Latuconsina; Bryan Domani; Salshabilla Adriani; Fadly Faisal; Raquel Katie; Gilbert Pattiruhu; Willem Bevers; Aliyah Khansa; Kaneishia Yusuf; Daffa Wardhana; Anyun Cadel; Elmayana Sabrenia; Rafi Sanjaya; Wina Marrino; Kiki Rizky; Hanata Rue; Amanda Lucson; Alif Joerg; Teddy Yudhistira; Umay Shahab
- Opening theme: "5 Detik dan Rasa Rindu" — Bryan Domani & Salshabilla Adriani
- Ending theme: "5 Detik dan Rasa Rindu" — Bryan Domani & Salshabilla Adriani
- Composer: Andi Rianto
- Country of origin: Indonesia
- Original language: Indonesian
- No. of seasons: 1
- No. of episodes: 8

Production
- Producer: Manoj Punjabi
- Cinematography: Jimmy Fajar
- Editor: Shandy Pratama Putra
- Camera setup: Multi-camera
- Running time: 30 minutes
- Production company: MD Entertainment

Original release
- Network: WeTV; Iflix; MDTV
- Release: 8 September – 12 October 2023

5 Detik dan Rasa Rindu (transl. 5 Seconds of Longing) is an Indonesian romantic drama musical streaming television series produced by MD Entertainment which premiered 8 September 2023 on WeTV. This series is an adaptation of the book with the same title. It stars Prilly Latuconsina, Bryan Domani, and Salshabilla Adriani.

== Plot ==
Via (Prilly Latuconsina) is a young employee at a record company. Via experiences pressure from his boss, Markus, to find a new artist to duet with Drupadi (Salshabilla Adriani).

Gana (Bryan Domani) was also appointed as Drupadi's duet friend. They then released a duet single adapted from a poem by Via entitled 5 Detik dan Rasa Rindu.

The song turned out to be successful and made fans hope that the two of them would fall in love. However, Gana actually fell in love with Via, and Via felt the same way.

Their love story became complicated because it turned out that Draupadi also liked her duet partner, until finally they were caught in a love triangle.

== Cast ==
- Prilly Latuconsina as Olivia "Via" Artania
- Bryan Domani as Ardlu "Gana" Mirage
- Salshabilla Adriani as Draupadi Bratamandisa
- Fadly Faisal as Jeffrey
- Raquel Katie as Ella
- Gilbert Pattiruhu as Adji
- Willem Bevers as Akbar Gunadi
- Aliyah Khansa as Andien
- Kaneishia Yusuf as Kanya
- Daffa Wardhana as Lilo
- Anyun Lisp as Ijal
- Elmayana Sabrenia as Sri
- Rafi Sanjaya as Rio
- Wina Marrino as Rania Gunadi
- Kiki Rizky as Markus
- Hanata Rue as Ashoka
- Amanda Lucson as Kirana
- Alif Joerg as Robby
- Teddy Yudhistira as Subiakto
- Umay Shahab as Umay

== Soundtrack ==
5 Detik dan Rasa Rindu

Soundtrack album by Bryan Domani, Salshabilla Adriani
- Released: 25 August 2023
- Recorded: 2023
- Length: 20:21
- Language: Indonesian
- Label: MD Music
- Producer: Manoj Punjabi

5 Detik dan Rasa Rindu is theme song album produced by MD Music as the theme song for the series 5 Detik dan Rasa Rindu. Most of this album is sung by Bryan Domani & Salshabilla Adriani.

=== Track listing ===
No.	Title	Artist(s)	Length
1.	"5 Detik dan Rasa Rindu"	Bryan Domani & Salshabilla Adriani	3:30
2.	"5 Detik dan Rasa Rindu (Bryan version)"	Bryan Domani	3:30
3.	"Angin Menderu"	Bryan Domani	4:13
4.	"Aku dan Kamu"	Bryan Domani	3:38
5.	"Angin dan Hujan"	Bryan Domani & Salshabilla Adriani	4:10
Total length:			20:21

== Production ==
=== Development ===
In May 2017, Manoj Punjabi's production firm MD Entertainment expressed interest in adapting the book into a film and purchased the rights to the book adaptation. In August 2017, Prilly Latuconsina announced that the film had entered the script writing phase.

However, after 4 years of the project being stalled and no news, in 2022 MD Entertainment announced that the book had finally been turned into a web series. The announcement was made on 17 February 2022 at the same time as the series' thanksgiving event. In August 2023, the teaser was released.
