= Danur 3: Sunyaruri =

- Poster
- Directed by: Awi Suryadi
- Written by: Agasyah Karim; Khalid Kashogi; Awi Suryadi
- Screenplay by: Lele Laila
- Based on: Sunyaruri by Risa Saraswati
- Produced by: Manoj Punjabi
- Starring: Prilly Latuconsina; Sandrinna Michelle; Rizky Nazar; Syifa Hadju; Umay Shahab; Steffi Zamora
- Cinematography: Adrian Sugiono
- Edited by: Firdauzi Trizkiyanto; Denny Rihardie
- Music by: Ricky Lionardi
- Production companies: MD Pictures; Pichouse Films
- Distributed by: Disney+ Hotstar; iflix; Prime Video; RCTI+; Vidio
- Release date: 26 September 2019
- Running time: 90 minutes
- Country: Indonesia
- Language: Indonesian

Danur 3: Sunyaruri is a 2019 Indonesian horror film directed by Awi Suryadi. The film is a prequel to Danur and Danur 2: Maddah. The film was produced by Manoj Punjabi with the production company of MD Pictures and Pichouse Films. The film is based on the novel Sunyaruri by Risa Saraswati and tells the story of five child ghosts from the previous film, namely Peter, William, Janshen, Hans, and Hendrick, or often called Peter et al at Saraswati's suggestion considering that another character, Asih, already has her own film.

== Cast ==
- Prilly Latuconsina as Risa Saraswati
- Sandrinna Michelle as Riana Rezeki/Riri
- Rizky Nazar as Dimas Tri Adityo
- Syifa Hadju as Raina
- Umay Shahab as Anton
- Steffi Zamora as Clara
- Yassien Omar as Peter Van Gils
- Daood Saleem as Jantje Heinrich Janshen
- Jason Lionel Theo as William Van Kemmen
- Alessandro Rizky Giannini as Hans Joseph Weel
- Matt White as Hendrick Konnings
- Hayati Azis as Kartika
- Chicco Kurniawan as Erick
- Dea Panendra as Canting

== Release ==
Danur 3: Sunyaruri held its gala premiere in Jakarta in September 2019, ahead of its nationwide theatrical release. The promotional event garnered significant media coverage, highlighted by the red carpet appearance of lead actress Prilly Latuconsina alongside the cast and crew, marking the official launch of the third instla in the Danur franchise. On 30 December 2020, Danur 3: Sunyaruri made its television premiere on the Indonesian channel Trans7.

== Reception ==
=== Critical response ===
Agustinus Dwi Nugroho from Montase Film gave rating 3.5 out of 5 and noted a mixed evaluation, noting that while the film maintains the franchise's signature dark aesthetic and high production values, it struggles with repetitive narrative formulas. The review highlighted that despite strong individual horror sequences and consistent performances from the lead cast, the film relies heavily on familiar jump scares and pacing structures seen in the previous installments, preventing it from offering a truly fresh experience for the genre.

Reviewing the film for Kumparan via Skyegrid-ID, the critic noted that Danur 3: Sunyaruri successfully delivers the expected atmospheric tension and jumpscares that fans of the franchise look forward to. The review commended Prilly Latuconsina's dedicated performance as Risa and praised the film's improved visual effects and sound design compared to its predecessors. However, it pointed out that the plot suffers from pacing issues in the middle act and remains formulaic, relying on established horror tropes rather than introducing novel narrative elements to the series.

Stella Azasya from IDN Times gave rating 3 out of 5 and praised Danur 3: Sunyaruri for its heightened emotional stakes and darker narrative compared to its predecessors, focusing heavily on the consequences of Risa closing her inner eye (mata batin). The publication lauded Prilly Latuconsina's strong emotional performance and the film's polished audio-visual elements, which effectively built a terrifying atmosphere. However, the review noted that the film's secondary characters and the ghost antagonists lacked adequate screen time and depth, and the plot resolution felt somewhat rushed despite the film's overlong build-up.

Writing for KINCIR, Dita Andriani rated Danur 3: Sunyaruri 3 out of 5 stars, noting that while the overarching plot was somewhat conventional and predictable, the story was significantly elevated by a redeeming plot twist near the end. Andriani praised the strong performances of the cast, particularly Prilly Latuconsina's reprisal of her role as Risa and Syifa Hadju’s effective portrayal of the antagonist. Furthermore, the review commended the film's technical achievements, highlighting its sombre visual tone and effective jump scares, which were enhanced by the horror genre's innovative use of Dolby Atmos audio technology.

In a review published on the citizen journalism platform Kompasiana, Rachmat Avre rated Danur 3: Sunyaruri a 7 out of 10. Avre described the overarching plot as standard, safe, and highly predictable, noting that the narrative initially felt monotonous as it focused on Risa’s inner conflict and her desire to close her third eye to lead a normal life. However, he wrote that the film's tense atmosphere was effectively established early on, and he praised the late-stage plot twist for significantly redeeming the otherwise conventional storyline.

=== Audience response ===
On the review aggregator website Jadwalnonton, Danur 3: Sunyaruri holds an average audience rating of 3.5 out of 5 stars based on user reviews. General viewers expressed mixed to positive reactions; while some members of the audience praised the film for its unpredictable ending, narrative depth, and underlying moral lessons, others felt it did not fully meet their expectations or noted that it was slightly less engaging compared to its predecessor, Danur 2: Maddah.

On the film review and social networking platform Letterboxd, Danur 3: Sunyaruri received mixed reactions from general audiences and user reviewers. While some viewers appreciated the performance of the lead cast and found the visual execution to be effectively atmospheric for a horror film, others criticised the narrative structure, noting that the plot felt formulaic and heavily reliant on standard genre tropes compared to previous installments in the Danur universe.
