= UNKL347 =

Indonesian clothing company

- Founded: 1996 in Bandung
- Headquarters: Bandung, Indonesia
- Products: Apparel
- Website: unkl347.com

UNKL347 is an Indonesian clothing company based in Bandung, West Java, Indonesia.

== History ==
The brand was founded in 1996 by two college friends in Bandung, West Java, Indonesia, when Dendy Darman, a design student at Bandung Institute of Technology, started making T-shirts and dacron jackets under the name of 347 board-riders. The owners renamed their label to UNKL347 in 2006. 347 was also the name of their store at Jl. Ir. H. Djuanda No. 347, Bandung, which opened in 1999.

The company pioneered the indie clothing trend and distribution outlets (called distros) in Bandung. The company published a design book in 2008, After Ten Years, Friends Call Us Unkle contains 12 years of work in design, including apparel design, print ads, catalogues, stickers, and postcards. The book also describes how the company has evolved since 1996.

UNKL347's store is located at Jalan Trunojoyo 4 Bandung. UNKL347 is a fashion retailer, and also offers products such as surfboards and furniture.

== Style ==
UNKL347 grew among independent communities in Indonesia. Instead of putting "Made in Indonesia", the company puts "This is not made in China" labels on its products as a campaign to support Indonesian products competing with products made in China.
