= Danur 2: Maddah =

2018 Indonesian horror film

- Directed by: Awi Suryadi
- Written by: Risa Saraswati
- Produced by: Manoj Punjabi
- Starring: Prilly Latuconsina; Sandrinna Michelle; Skornicki; Shawn Adrian Khulafa; Sophia Latjuba; Bucek Depp; Gama Haritz; Kevin Bzezovski Taroreh; Elena Viktoria Holovscák; Alexander Bain
- Production companies: MD Pictures; Pichouse Films
- Distributed by: MD Entertainment
- Release date: 28 March 2018
- Country: Indonesia
- Language: Indonesian
- Box office: $7.6 million

Danur 2: Maddah is a 2018 Indonesian supernatural horror film directed by Awi Suryadi and written by Lele Laila. The film stars Prilly Latuconsina, Sandrinna Michelle and Shawri Adrian Khulafa in leading roles with Sophia Latjuba, Bucek Depp, and Gama Haritz in supporting roles. The film is the sequel to the 2017 film Danur: I Can See Ghosts, (Note: multiple sources:) and is followed by Danur 3: Sunyaruri in 2019. (Note: multiple sources:)

== Plot ==
A year after her revisit to her childhood home, Risa and her sister Riri live in Bandung alongside Peter, William, and Janshen. Due to Elly going abroad along with her husband, they generally visit their aunt Tina's residence. Tina lives along with her husband Ahmad and son Angki. Riri, now a ballet rookie, enrages whilst Risa shouts amidst her stage overall performance, as there is a ghost behind her. Meanwhile, Peter, William, and Janshen meet fellow ghost friends Hendrick and Hans.

Risa slowly turns suspicious towards Ahmad, who unexpectedly turns introverted, in addition to regularly scattering tuberose vases everywhere in the residence. Risa spots Ahmad taking walks with a woman, soaking up scents of infidelity to her. Strange matters occur; Tina is traumatized by an encounter with a ghost, leading her to be hospitalized. At the sanatorium, Risa meets a corpse purifier who additionally has the ability to engage with ghosts; he explains that foxy ghosts can select whether or no longer their danur is capable of getting in contact with a human's senses, suggesting she exercise maddah, a ritual to deepen one's powers.

Fed up with the hauntings, Angki urges Risa to use her sixth sense to know what is actually taking place. Risa opens her frame for a ghost; the ghost tells Angki that she will kill Ahmad. Risa shows Angki a diary she took from Ahmad. In it, Ahmad claims to worship a female named Elizabeth, who will soon begin her twenty-third birthday; Ahmad plans to "meet" with her. Observing Elizabeth's photograph, Ahmad notes that she is the same as Ahmad's ex-female friend. Gathering the diary and a peculiar photo Riri located previously, Risa suspects that Elizabeth is a colonial-era Dutch girl who plans to kill Ahmad as an alternate for a brand new spouse. Risa rushes and rescues Ahmad, ripping all pictures of any Dutch ladies within the residence. Ahmad is later possessed; Risa is helped with the aid of her ghost friends to save Ahmad from Elizabeth. Afterward, a distraught Ahmad tears up his diary.

Risa's ghost friends introduce her to Ivanna, one of the Dutch women she noticed in an image. Ivanna explains that her brother, Dimas, changed into Elizabeth's boyfriend. Dimas is killed by Elizabeth's father, who does not believe their relationship, and Ivanna cuts off her family from Elizabeth's on account of that then.

Sometime later, Risa, her friend, Tina, Ahmad, and Angki visit the theater to watch Riri's ballet performance. In the midst of her stage performance, Risa sees Canting, the theater's ghost.

== Cast ==
- Prilly Latuconsina as Risa Saraswati
- Gama Haritz as Peter Van Gils
- Alexander P Bain as William Van Kemmen
- Kevin Bzezovski Taroreh as Jantje Heinrich Janshen
- Matthew White as Hendrick Konnings
- Justin Rosi as Hans Joseph Weel
- Sandrinna Michelle as Riri
- Sophia Latjuba as Tina
- Carolina Passoni Fattori as Elizabeth Brouwer
- Shareefa Daanish as Asih
- Elena Victoria Holovcsák as Ivanna Van Dijk
- Risa Saraswati as Doctor
