= Omar Daniel (actor) =

Indonesian actor

- عمر دانيال السقاف
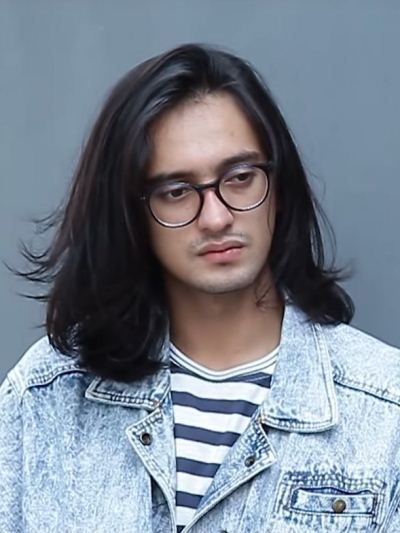
- Omar Daniel in 2016
- Born: Omar Daniel Assegaf; April 9, 1995 (age 31); Surakarta, Central Java, Indonesia
- Education: Senior High School Batik 1 Surakarta (2010 - 2013); Mercu Buana University (2013 - 2017)
- Occupations: Celebrity; Presenter; Model
- Years active: 2015 - present
- Parents: Ali Reza Assegaf (father); Farida Achmad (mother)
- Relatives: Aisya Melissa (sister); Hadijah Tania (sister); Kamila (sister)

Omar Daniel Assegaf or better known as Omar Daniel (Arabic: عمر دانيال السقاف, romanized: ʻUmar Dāniyāl al-Saqqāf, Arabic pronunciation: [ˈʕʊmɑr da:nija:l as-saqa:f]; born 9 April 1995) is an Indonesian actor, presenter, and model. Omar Daniel first plunged into the world of Indonesia's television in 2016 and played as Fahri in the soap opera of SinemArt production titled Anak Jalanan. But he began to be known thanks to his role as Rey in the soap opera Anugerah Cinta. In 2017, Omar Daniel completed his studies at Mercu Buana University and earned his S.IKom (Bachelor of Communication Science).

== Biography ==
=== Early life ===
Omar Daniel was born in Surakarta, Central Java as the last of four children. All of his siblings are women, including Aisya Melissa, Hadijah Tania, and Kamila. Daniel comes from the Ba 'Alawi sada family of Arab Hadhrami descent surnamed Assegaf (Arabic: السقاف, romanized: al-Saqqāf, Arabic pronunciation: [as-saqa:f]), his father is a private businessman named Ali Reza Assegaf, while his mother was named Farida Achmad. His father was born in Surakarta, but has the blood of Arab, Dutch, and Javanese descent from his grandparents.

=== Education ===
Omar Daniel graduated from Senior High School Batik 1 Surakarta in 2013. Furthermore, he continued his education to Jakarta, precisely at the Mercu Buana University. On 26 July 2016, he graduated as Bachelor of Communication Science at Indonesia Convention Exhibition, Bumi Serpong Damai, South Tangerang. Omar Daniel successfully completed his lecture for 3 years 7 months with a GPA of 3.75.

=== Personal life ===
Omar Daniel is known to be close to actress Cut Meyriska. The closeness of both begins when they are paired in a similar soap opera titled Putri Titipan Tuhan that aired on SCTV. Even so, the two claimed to be just regular friends and no other special relationship. Omar Daniel admits that he does not want to fabricate personal relationships just to increase his popularity. On 25 January 2018, Daniel was seen accompanied by a woman named Amira while attending Magnum Fashion Giveaway event at The Pallas, Sudirman Central Business District, South Jakarta. But Daniel also confessed that Amira was just a casual close friend.

== Career ==
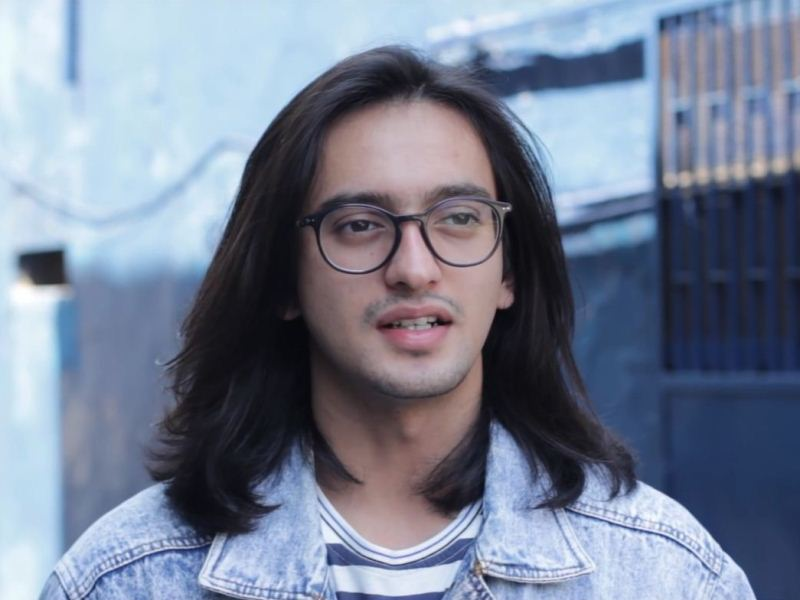
Omar Daniel when interviewed at Gogirl! TV in 2016

Before plunging into the world of acting, Omar Daniel first plunge into the world of advertising and Models. One of ads who he starred in were 3 (telecommunications). Although at first he refused an offer to play soap operas, but in the end he accepted it as well. One of the soap operas that make his name soar is Anugerah Cinta, with his role as a Rey figure.

== Filmography ==
=== Soap opera ===
Title	Year	Role	Notes	Refs.
Anak Jalanan (Street Children)	2016	Fahri	Produced by SinemArt, airing on RCTI	
Anugerah Cinta (the Gift of Love)	2016	Rey	Produced by SinemArt, airing on RCTI	
Berkah Cinta (the Blessing of Love)	2017	Vano	Produced by SinemArt, airing on SCTV	
Mawar dan Melati (Mawar and Melati)	2017	Fadel	Produced by SinemArt, airing on SCTV	
Putri Titipan Tuhan (Daughter Entrusted from God)	2017	Willy	Produced by SinemArt, airing on SCTV	
Dua Wanita Cantik (Two Beautiful Women)	2017	Radit	Produced by SinemArt, airing on SCTV	
Dia (He)	2017	Reno	Produced by SinemArt, airing on SCTV	
Malaikat Cinta (the Angel of Love)	2018	Kaisan	Produced by SinemArt, airing on SCTV	
