= Manoj Punjabi =

Indian-Indonesian film and television producer

- ਮਨੋਜ ਪੰਜਾਬੀ
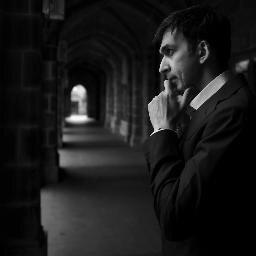
- Born: Manoj Dhamoo Punjabi; 7 December 1972 (age 53); Jakarta, Indonesia
- Education: Gandhi Memorial Intercontinental School
- Occupations: Film and television producer
- Years active: 1995–present
- Spouse: Shania Punjabi
- Children: 3
- Relatives: Raam Punjabi (uncle)
- Website: mdentertainment.com

Manoj Dhamoo Punjabi (born 7 December 1972) is an Indonesian film and television producer. Born in a prominent Indian-Indonesian entertainment business family, he co-founded and is the CEO of MD Entertainment (Multi Dimensia Entertainment, also known as Manoj Dhamoo Entertainment, named after him and his father and founded by them along with Manoj's wife Shania as MD Media), the largest film production house in Indonesia and one of the domestic film companies listed on the Indonesia Stock Exchange.

Manoj produced KKN di Desa Penari (2022), the third highest-grossing film of Indonesia and has produced 7 of the top 20 highest-grossing Indonesian films. He has also produced soap operas, music, animation and web content.

Punjabi is noted for his role in the revival of Indonesian horror in the 21st-century.

== Family ==
Manoj Punjabi is of Indian Sindhi descent. He is married to Shania Punjabi and has 3 children. His uncle is Raam Punjabi, the owner of Multivision Plus (MVP), the family entertainment business before Manoj split to form MD Entertainment.

== Filmography ==
=== Film ===
Year	Title	Credited as	Notes
Year	Title	Producer	Notes
2007	Kala	Yes	
2007	Suster Ngesot the Movie	Yes	
2007	Lawang Sewu: Dendam Kuntilanak	Yes	
2008	Hantu Jembatan Ancol	Yes	
2008	Ayat-Ayat Cinta	Yes	
2008	Kesurupan	Yes	
2008	Namaku Dick	Yes	
2008	Best Friend?	Yes	
2008	Oh Baby	Yes	
2008	Asoy Geboy	Yes	
2008	Cinlok	Yes	
2009	SMS (Suka Ma Suka)	Yes	
2009	Preman in Love	Yes	
2010	Ngebut Kawin	Yes	
2010	Roman Picisan	Yes	
2010	Love in Perth	Yes	
2011	Di Bawah Lindungan Ka'bah	Yes	
2012	My Last Love	Yes	
2012	Kuntilanak-Kuntilanak	Yes	
2012	Habibie & Ainun	Yes	
2014	Tak Kemal Maka Tak Sayang	Yes	
2014	Merry Riana: Mimpi Sejuta Dolar	Yes	
2015	Surga yang Tak Dirindukan	Yes	
2016	Rudy Habibie	Yes	
2017	Surga yang Tak Dirindukan 2	Yes	Both producer and writer
2017	Stip & Pensil	Yes	
2017	Insya Allah Sah	Yes	
2017	A: Aku, Benci & Cinta	Yes	
2017	Ruqyah: The Exorcism	Yes	
2017	Devil’s Whisper	Yes	A collaborative movie between America and Indonesia
2017	Gasing Tengkorak	Yes	
2017	Ayat-Ayat Cinta 2	Yes	
2018	Danur 2: Maddah	Yes	
2018	Ananta	Yes	
2018	Alas Pati: Hutan Mati	Yes	
2018	Insya Allah Sah 2	Yes	
2018	DOA (Doyok-Otoy-Ali Oncom): Cari Jodoh	Yes	
2018	Bisikan Iblis	Yes	
2018	Asih	Yes	
2018	Hanum & Rangga: Faith & The City	Yes	
2018	Silam	Yes	
2019	Perjanjian dengan Iblis	Yes	
2019	Matt & Mou	Yes	
2019	Satu Suro	Yes	
2019	MatiAnak	Yes	
2019	Sunyi	Yes	
2019	Mendadak Kaya	Yes	
2019	Twivortiare	Yes	
2019	Danur 3: Sunyaruri	Yes	
2019	Habibie & Ainun 3	Yes	
2020	Dignitate	Yes	
2020	Sabar Ini Ujian	Yes	
2020	Pelukis Hantu	Yes	
2020	Nona	Executive	
2020	Di Bawah Umur	Executive	
2020	Asih 2	Yes	
2021	Surga yang Tak Dirindukan 3	Yes	
2021	Adit Sopo Jarwo the Movie	Yes	
2021	Wedding Proposal	Executive	
2021	Till Death Do Us Part	Yes	
2021	Devil on Top	Yes	
2021	The Watcher	Yes	
2022	Kukira Kau Rumah	Executive	
2022	Garis Waktu	Yes	
2022	Before I Met You	Executive	
2022	KKN di Desa Penari	Yes	
2022	Naga Naga Naga	Executive	
2022	Ivanna	Yes	
2022	Mendarat Darurat	Yes	
2022	Ayo Putus	Yes	
2023	Hidayah	Executive	
2023	Scandal Makers	Yes	
2023	Bismillah Kunikahi Suamimu	Yes	
2023	Sewu Dino	Yes	
2023	Ganjil Genap	Yes	
2023	Catatan Si Boy	Yes	
2023	Kisah Tanah Jawa: Pocong Gundul	Yes	
2023	Kapan Hamil?	Yes	
2023	Layangan Putus the Movie	Yes	
2024	Ancika: Dia yang Bersamaku 1995	Yes	
2024	Do You See What I See	Yes	
2024	Ipar Adalah Maut	Yes	
2024	Jurnal Risa the Movie	Yes	
2024	Dancing Village: The Curse Begins	Yes	
2024	Munkar	Yes	
2024	Ayo Balikan	Yes	
2024	Dinda	Yes	
2024	Sorop	Yes	
2024	Laura	Yes	
2024	Perewangan	Yes	
2024	Petak Umpet	Executive	
2025	Sebelum 7 Hari	Yes	

=== Television serials ===
Read more here: MD Entertainment (in Bahasa Indonesia)

- 5 Detik dan Rasa Rindu

=== Web series ===
Read more here: MD Entertainment (in Bahasa Indonesia)
