= Rapi Films =

Indonesian Film company

PT Rapi Films
- Trade name: Rapi Films
- Type: Private company
- Industry: Films and TV shows
- Founded: 1968; 58 years ago
- Founder: Gope T. Samtani
- Headquarters: Jl. Cikini II No. 7A, Central Jakarta, Indonesia
- Area served: Indonesia
- Key people: Gope T. Samtani; Sunil Samtani; Sunar Samtani
- Website: www.rapifilms.com

PT Rapi Films is an Indonesian film production company of mostly exploitation films which was founded in 1968 and was internationally successful mostly in the 1980s. They produced many martial arts films and horror films involving black magic, inspired by old Indonesian legends. Directors who worked for them during this period include Ratno Timoer, H. Tjut Djalil and Sisworo Gautama Putra.

Today they produce mostly TV-series and some feature films.

== Production ==
=== Films ===
- Pemberangan (1967)
- Penaggalan (1968)
- Maria Maria (1970)
- Rio Anakku (1973)
- Menangis Semalam (1975)
- Only U (Dulce Enemiga) (1976)
- Sirena (1976)
- Morelia (1976)
- Cinta Fitri (1977)
- Cinta Fitri 2 (1977)
- Dia Bukan Anakku (1977)
- Tanpa Kekasih (1977)
- Cinta Fitri 3 (1978)
- Rahasia Perkawinan (1978)
- 100 Hari Mencari Cinta (1978)
- Cinta Fitri 4: Cinta Tiada Akhir (1978)
- Cinta Fitri 5 (1979)
- Ira Maya Sopha Putri Cinderella (1978)
- Cinta Fitri 6 (1979)
- Ira Maya Sopha Anak Tiri (1979)
- Pinokio (1979)
- Cara Bonita (1979)
- Gata Salvaje (1979)
- Kesetiaan Cinta (1979)
- Cinta Fitri 7: Bukan Cinta Biasa (1979)
- Ratu Ilmu Hitam (1979)
- Irama Cinta (1979)
- Pengabdi Setan (1980)
- Yolanda Lujan (1980)
- Pelajaran Cinta (1980)
- Srigala (1980)
- Kerinduan (1981)
- Mama (1981)
- Aku & Dia (1981)
- Sundel Bolong (1981)
- Sangkuriang (1982)
- Fiorella/Pobre Diabla (1982)
- Bakekang (1982)
- Maria Isabel (1982)
- Reina de Corazones (1982)
- Soledad (1983)
- La Viuda de Blanco (1983)
- Gejolak Kawula Muda (1984)
- Idola Remaja (1985)
- Esmeralda (1985)
- Santet (1986)
- Daniela (1987)
- Aku Ingin Pulang (1987)
- Titip Rindu Buat Ayah (1988)
- Camelia (1988)
- Panggung Sandiwara (1988)
- Jangan Ada Angkara (1989)
- Tragedi Malaysia (1990)
- Guntur Tengah Malam (1990)
- Lady Dragon (1992)
- Tragedi Malaysia 2 (1992)
- Cinta Kecamatan Weleri (1992)
- Ada Cinta di Semarang (1993)
- Rino Rino (1993)
- Lady Dragon 2 (1993)
- Cinta Abadi (1993)
- Kasmaran (1994)
- Tragedi Malaysia 3 (1994)
- Dewi Angin-Angin (1994)
- Catatan Hari Tante Sonya (1994)
- Toda Mujer (1994)
- Hangatnya Cinta (1995)
- Nyak Cemplon & Nyak Salma (1995)
- Gejolak Cinta SMA (1995)
- Gejolak Cinta SMA 2 (1996)
- El Despersio (1996)
- Gejolak Cinta SMA 3 (1996)
- Dilema Karunia (1997)
- Gita Cinta dari SMA (1997)
- Puspa Indah Taman Hati (1998)
- Peluk Aku di bangku kelas 3 SMA (1998)
- Ciudad Bendita/Dangdut Membawa Berkah (1999)
- Joshua oh Joshua (2000)
- Merdeka 17805 (2001)
- Tropico (2001)
- Catatan Si Mitha (2001)
- Usia 17 (2001)
- Ada Cinta di Bandung (2002)
- Catatan Si Mitha 2 (2002)
- Catatan Si Mitha 3 (2003)
- Calle Luna, Calle Sol (2004)
- Catatan Si Mitha 4 (2004)
- Catatan Si Juanita (2005)
- Inikah Rasanya Cinta (2005)
- Lentera Merah (2006)
- Yolanda Lujan (remake, 2006)
- D'Bijis (2007)
- Merah Itu Cinta (2007)
- Legenda Sundel Bolong (2007)
- 40 Hari Bangkitnya Pocong (2008)
- Kereta Hantu Manggarai (2008)
- Mupeng (2008)
- Hantu Rumah Ampera (2009)
- Bukan Malin Kundang (2009)
- Kain Kafan Perawan (2010)
- Not For Sale (2010)
- Pocong Jumat Kliwon (2010)
- Pengantin Sunat (2010)
- 3 Pejantan Tangguh (2010)
- Pocong Ngesot (2011)
- Kuntilanak Kesurupan (2011)
- Kepergok Pocong (2011)
- Keranda Kuntilanak (2011)
- Ayah Mengapa Aku Berbeda? (2011)
- My Blackberry Girlfriend (2011)
- Pengabdi Setan (2017)
- Impetigore (2019)
- May the Devil Take You Too (2020)
- Pengabdi Setan 2 (2022)
- Waktu Maghrib (2023)

=== Television ===
- Si Cemplon (SCTV, 1993-1995)
- Tantangan (Indosiar, 1994-1996)
- Harta & Nyawa (Indosiar, 1994-1995)
- Bukan Cinta Sesaat (SCTV, 1995-1996,1997-1999)
- Nurlela (SCTV, 1995-1996)
- Harga Sebuah Nyawa (Indosiar, 1995-1996)
- Noktah Merah Perkawinan (Indosiar, 1995-1996)
- Noktah Merah Perkawinan season 2 (Indosiar, 1996-1997)
- Dua Sisi Mata Uang (RCTI, 1996-1997)
- Kipas-Kipas Asmara (Indosiar, 1997-1998)
- Rama & Jamillah (SCTV, 1997-1998)
- Berikannya Cinta (Indosiar, 1997-1998)
- Diantara Dua Sisi (RCTI, 1998-1999)
- Hanya Satu Mutiara (RCTI, 1999)
- Aku Ingin Pulang (SCTV, 1999-2001)
- Kesucian Prasasti (Indosiar, 1999-2000)
- Kabulkan Doaku season 1 (SCTV, 1999-2000)
- Berikan Aku Cinta (Indosiar, 2000-2001)
- Cinta Pertama (Indosiar, 2000-2001)
- Kabulkan Doaku season 2 (RCTI, 2000)
- Meniti Cinta (RCTI, 2001)
- Andini/Demi Cinta (Indosiar, 2001)
- Romantika (Indosiar, 2001)
- Aku & Dia (Indosiar, 2001-2002)
- Kumasih Milikmu (RCTI, 2001-2002)
- Buah Hati Mama (Trans TV, 2001-2002)
- Aku Cinta Kamu (SCTV, 2002)
- Cinta SMU 1 (Indosiar, 2002-2004)
- Badut Pasti Berlalu (Indosiar, 2002)
- Love in Bombay (Indosiar, 2002-2003)
- Gejolak Jiwa 1 (Indosiar, 2002-2003)
- Doa & Cinta (TPI, 2002)
- Gejolak Jiwa season 2 (Indosiar, 2003)
- Montir-Montir Cantik (RCTI, 2003-2004)
- Kenapa Ada Cinta (RCTI, 2003)
- Papaku Keren-Keren (Indosiar, 2003-2004)
- Dina & Lisa (TV7, 2003-2004)
- Dewi Angin-Angin (Indosiar, 2003)
- Inikah Rasanya season 1 (SCTV, 2003-2004)
- Dibalik Kuasa Tuhan (ANTV, 2003)
- Cinta SMU season 2 (Indosiar, 2004-2005)
- Inikah Rasanya season 2 (SCTV, 2004-2005)
- Cinta Terbagi 5 (SCTV, 2004-2005)
- Bukan Cinta Biasa (Trans TV, 2004)
- Ada Cinta di Lantai 9 (Trans TV, 2004)
- X-Presi Cinta (Indosiar, 2004)
- Culunnya Pacarku (RCTI, 2004-2005)
- Aku Ingin Hidup (SCTV, 2004)
- Pilihlah Aku (SCTV, 2004-2005)
- Satu Bunga Empat Kumbang (TV7, 2004-2005)
- Inikah Rasanya 3 - 5 (SCTV, 2005)
- Cinta 100 Hari (SCTV, 2005)
- Dibalik Kuasa Ilahi (Indosiar, 2005)
- Mutiara Hati season 1 (SCTV, 2005)
- Sayangi Aisyah (RCTI, 2005-2006)
- Kupu-Kupu Malam (TPI, 2005-2006)
- Dewi Cinta (TPI, 2006)
- Arti Cinta (TPI, 2006)
- Istri Untuk Suamiku (RCTI, 2006)
- Rindu - Rindu Asmara (TPI, 2006)
- Gejolak Jiwa season 3 (Indosiar, 2006-2007)
- Bunga - Bunga Cinta (TPI, 2006)
- Mutiara Hati season 2 (SCTV, 2006)
- Idola (RCTI, 2006-2007)
- Nadia (SCTV, 2007)
- Andai Ku Tahu (RCTI, 2007)
- Bembi (RCTI, 2007)
- Keluarga Harapanku (Indosiar, 2007)
- Ronaldowati season 1 (TPI, 2007-2008)
- Doo Bee Doo (RCTI, 2008)
- Ketabahan (Astro Oasis, 2008)
- Cerita SMA (RCTI, 2008)
- Janji Hati (RCTI, 2008)
- Kamulah Surgaku (Astro Oasis, 2008)
- Ronaldowati season 2 (TPI, 2008-2009)
- Tarzan Cilik (RCTI, 2009)
- Sakinah (Indosiar, 2009)
- Ben 7 (TPI, 2009)
- Impian Sang Putri (Indosiar, 2009)
- Baim Anak Sholeh (RCTI, 2009)
- Buku Harian Baim (SCTV, 2009-2010)
- Kowboy Cabe Rawit (SCTV, 2010)
- Arti Sahabat (Indosiar, 2010-2011)
- Mendadak Alim (Global TV, 2010)
- Persada Langit Biru (Global TV, 2010)
- Bintang Untuk Baim (SCTV, 2011)
- Baim Jaim (MNCTV, 2011)
- Arti Sahabat 2 (Indosiar, 2011)
- Gol Gol Fatimah (SCTV, 2011)
- Dia Atau Diriku (SCTV, 2011-2012)
