= IDN Times =

Indonesian digital media platform

- Company type: Private
- Industry: Media
- Founded: June 8, 2014; 11 years ago
- Founders: Winston Utomo; William Utomo
- Headquarters: Jakarta (IDN HQ) and Surabaya, East Java (Surabaya Creative Lab), Indonesia
- Area served: Worldwide
- Parent: IDN
- Website: idntimes.com

IDN Times is a digital multi-platform media outlet that provides news and entertainment for Millennials and Gen Z in Indonesia. IDN Times is one of IDN’s business units under the Digital Media pillar, founded by Winston Utomo and William Utomo on June 8, 2014. Currently, senior journalist Uni Zulfiani Lubis serves as the Editor-in-Chief of IDN Times.

== History ==
IDN Times was initially known as Indonesian Times, a blog featuring articles written by Winston Utomo while he was working at Google Singapore. As interest and readership grew, Indonesian Times evolved into IDN Times, a digital multi-platform media company focused on delivering relevant content for Indonesia’s younger generations.

== Bureau ==
IDN Times has a representative bureau that has spread over 12 provinces in Indonesia:

IDN Times bureau	Province
IDN Times Bali	Bali
IDN Times Banten	Banten
IDN Times Jabar	West Java
IDN Times Jateng	Central Java
IDN Times Jatim	East Java
IDN Times Jogja	Special Region of Yogyakarta
IDN Times Kaltim	East Kalimantan
IDN Times Lampung	Lampung
IDN Times NTB	West Nusa Tenggara
IDN Times Sulsel	South Sulawesi
IDN Times Sumsel	South Sumatra
IDN Times Sumut	North Sumatra

== Events ==
=== Indonesia Millennial and Gen Z Summit ===
The Indonesia Millennial and Gen-Z Summit (IMGS) is an annual event organized by IDN. This event aims to empower Indonesia’s younger generations through discussions and interdisciplinary collaborations. IMGS features inspirational figures, professionals, and leaders from various fields who share insights and drive positive change.

The event hosts dozens of discussion sessions in collaboration with eight prominent communities. Topics covered include politics, economics, technology, and pop culture.

=== Indonesia Writers Festival ===
The Indonesia Writers Festival is an independent writing festival organized by IDN Times. The event seeks to empower Indonesians through writing by inviting experts and literacy activists from various backgrounds.

== Duniaku.com ==
Duniaku.com is a multi-platform digital media part of IDN Times which presents content about geek culture ranging from video games, anime, comics, films, technology and gadgets. Duniaku.com was officially launched on September 6, 2019 by the Minister of Communication and Informatics Rudiantara together with CEO of IDN Media Winston Utomo and IDN Times and Editor-in-Chief of Duniaku.com Uni Lubis.

== Awards ==
- 2019 IDN won WAN-IFRA Asia Digital Media Awards 2019 as the Best Digital Project to Engage Younger and/or Millennial Audiences for IDN Times’ #MillennialsMemilih program
- 2020 IDN Times (IDN Times Community) won WAN-IFRA Asia Digital Media Awards 2019 in The Best in Audience Engagement category.
- 2021 IDN Times journalists won awards at the Subroto Award, Ministry of Energy and Mineral Resources (ESDM) on 28 September 2021.
- 2024 IDN Times won WAN-IFRA event at both the Asia and Global levels in Best Use of AI in Revenue Strategy.

=== #Interconnected22 by Pulitzer Center ===
One of the IDN Times journalists, Dhana Kencana, was the speaker at the #Interconnected22 conference held from June 9 to June 10, 2022, in Washington DC, United States of America. Dhana Kencana is also a grant recipient Pulitzer Center through the Rainforest Journalism Fund (RJF) program, a funding program for journalists that makes a number of coverage of the rainforest.
