= Suara (newspaper) =

Hong Kong newspaper

- Type: Fortnightly newspaper
- Owner: HK Publications Ltd.
- Founded: 2002
- Language: Indonesian
- Circulation: 35,000 (as of 2007)
- Sister newspapers: Hong Kong News
- Website: www.suara.com.hk

Suara (literally "Voice") is an Indonesian-language newspaper published fortnightly in Hong Kong. Founded in 2002, it is popular among the territory's population of approximately 150,000 Indonesian domestic workers. A 2007 profile in The Jakarta Post called Suara the "principal Indonesian language-newspaper in Hong Kong".

== History ==
Suara was founded in 2002. It began publication in 2003, initially printing 16,000 copies of each 16-page edition. The newspaper is owned by HK Publications Limited, which also publishes Hong Kong News, a twice-monthly paper targeting the Filipino community in Hong Kong. HK Publications is owned by entrepreneur David Chen, and was first registered in Hong Kong as Onephone Limited in 2000. An early editor of the paper was Mohammed Fanani, who previously worked as a journalist in Jakarta. Fanani left Suara in 2010 and returned to Indonesia.

According to a 2007 profile of the newspaper in The Jakarta Post, each edition of Suara, published twice monthly, saw a print run of 35,000 copies. The outlet had three staff members in 2008, and also paid Indonesian migrant workers to contribute their own personal stories.

== Business model and content ==
The newspaper is registered under the Registration of Local Newspapers Ordinance. It is distributed for free, and is supported by advertising. It is mainly distributed through Indonesian shops in Hong Kong and by migrant workers' organisations. Suara also publishes on the Internet via a website and several social media channels. Suara's parent company is associated with mobile phone companies, and many of the advertisements appearing in the newspaper market their products and services to Indonesian domestic workers.

Suara covers news from both Indonesia and Hong Kong. It specialises in content relevant to the lives of Indonesian migrant workers in Hong Kong. The newspaper has been noted for the quality of its journalism compared to other Indonesian-language media outlets in Hong Kong, hiring professional journalists and publishing pieces highlighting injustices against migrant workers, such as wage fraud and domestic violence. It also reports on the activities of the Indonesian consulate in Hong Kong. The newspaper has been said to help empower Indonesian migrant workers in Hong Kong by providing them with information on matters affecting their livelihood, and by serving as a forum for migrant workers to express themselves and develop writing skills.

== Shooting of associate editor ==
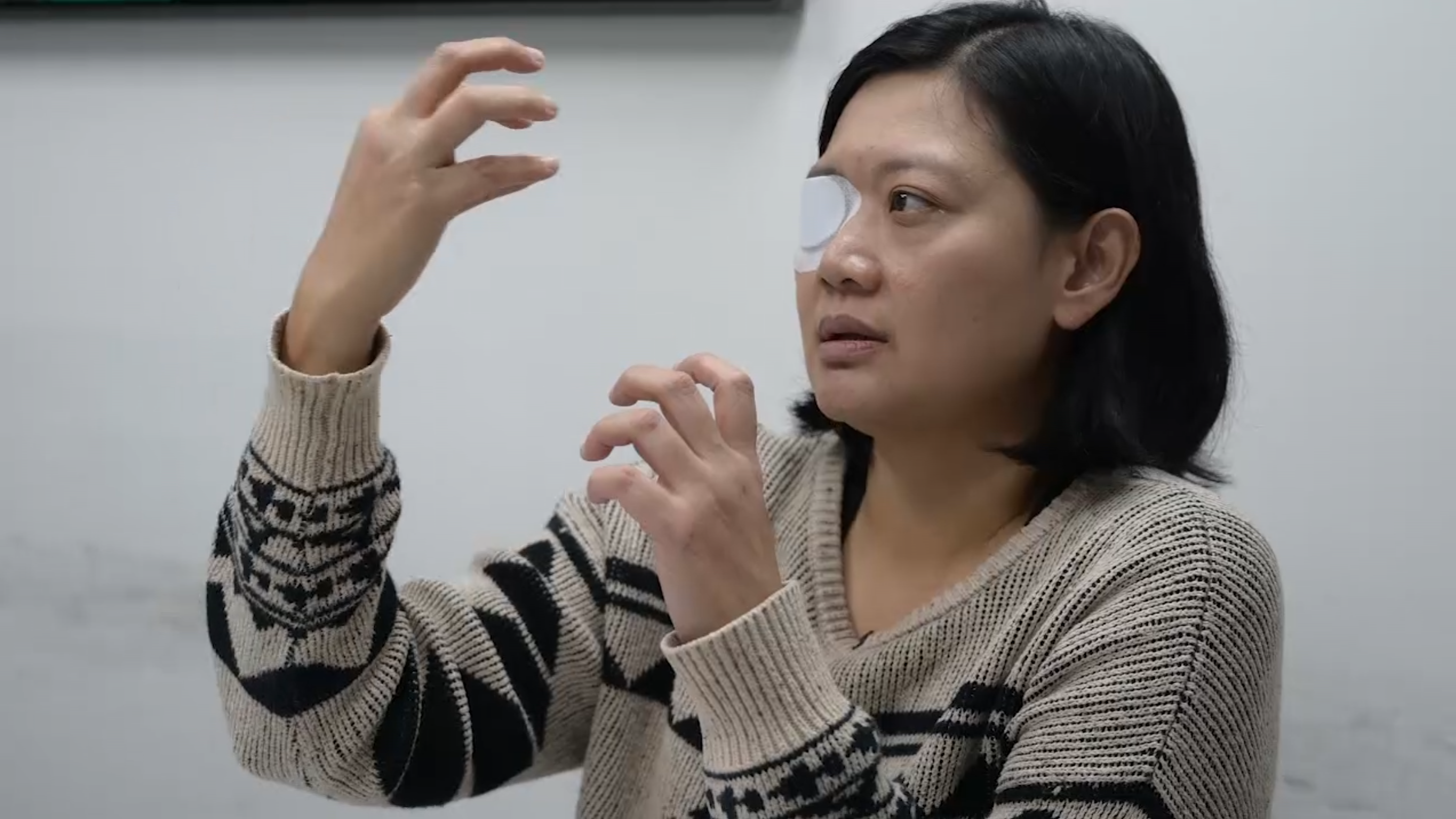
Veby Mega Indah

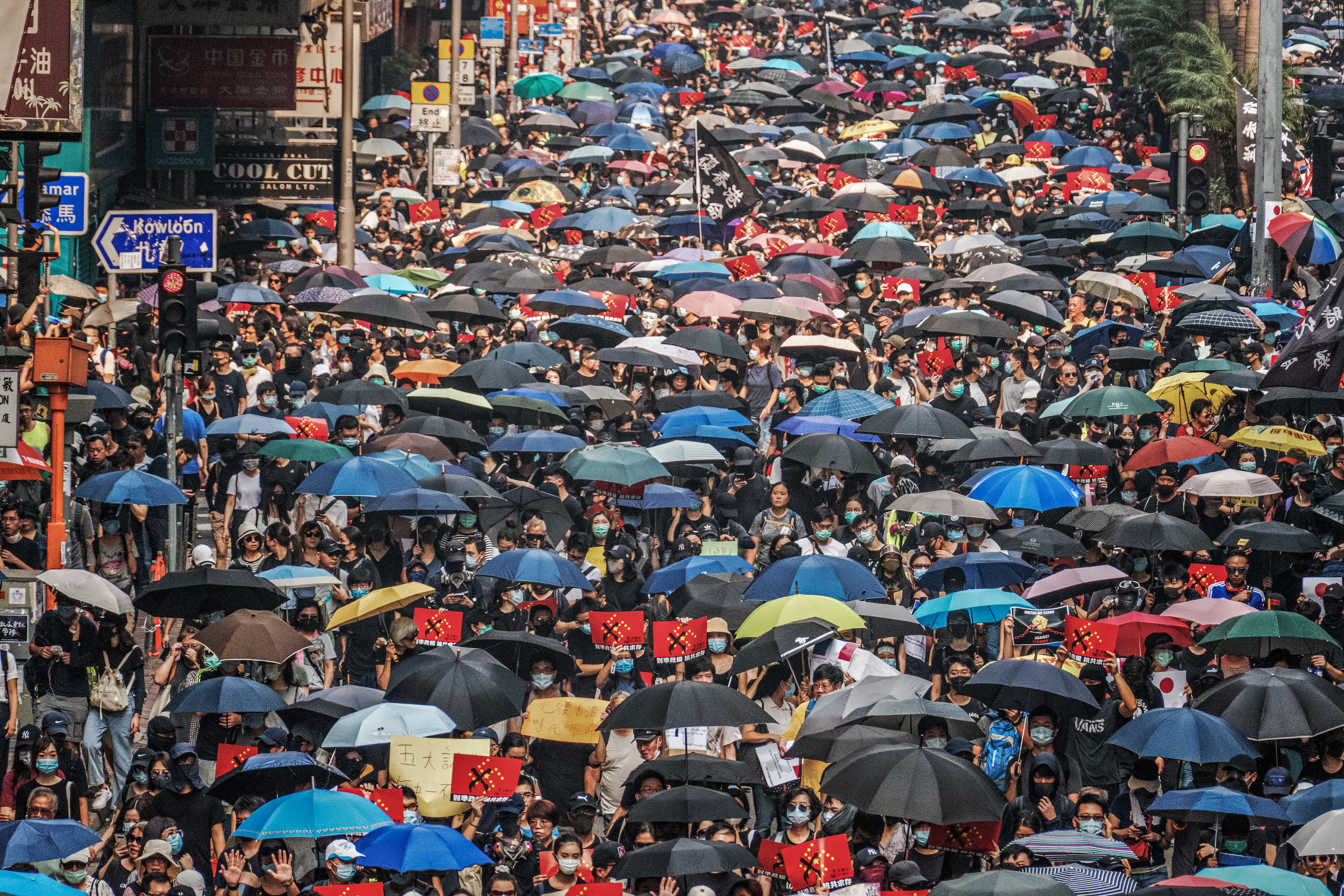
Anti-totalitarianism rally held on 29 September 2019

Amid the pro-democratic 2019–20 Hong Kong protests, a "global anti-totalitarianism protest" was held on Hong Kong Island on 29 September 2019. Suara associate editor Veby Mega Indah, covering the protest in Wan Chai, was shot in the face with a projectile fired by Hong Kong Police Force officers on the O'Brien Road footbridge. According to video footage, Indah was wearing high-visibility clothing and a helmet with "press" decals. The footage also showed journalists alerting the police to their presence and asking them not to shoot.

Upon being shot, Indah fell to the ground and was treated by first aid workers on the scene before being taken to Pamela Youde Nethersole Eastern Hospital. She lost sight permanently in her right eye. Indah's lawyer stated that he believed the projectile fired by police was a rubber bullet.

The Hong Kong Journalists Association released a statement expressing concern about reports that Indah was not in the vicinity of the protesters at the time of the shooting, and was clearly marked as a member of the press. Suara released a statement strongly condemning the shooting, alleging that Indah "clearly could not have been mistaken for a protester" given her attire and press markings. The Alliance of Independent Journalists, based in Indonesia, called on the Hong Kong Police to hold the shooter accountable.

Indah is attempting to pursue private prosecution against the officer who shot her, stating that she hopes her case will prompt a reform of police conduct, thereby preventing a repeat occurrence. However, her case could not proceed as she did not know the shooter's identity. In January 2020, the Hong Kong Police Force stated that it knew the identity of the officer, but would not divulge the information to Indah as the matter remained under "active investigation". By March 2020, the police force's refusal to name the officer prompted some netizens to share his purported identity on social media. In response, the police arrested one public figure who had shared such a social media post, pro-democratic district councillor Cheng Lai-king, on "sedition" grounds.

The shooting was cited by commentators as an example of increasingly frequent attacks on journalists by Hong Kong police during the 2019–20 protests. Indah echoed these sentiments, stating that the numbers of attacks suggested the police were targeting journalists.
