= 2026 Indonesian Film Festival =

Indonesian film award ceremony

46th Indonesian Film Festival
- Official poster
- Awarded for: The achievement in Indonesian cinema
- Presented by: Ministry of Culture; Indonesian Film Board
- Announced on: Nominations: 12 October 2026
- Presented on: 20 November 2026
- Site: Jakarta International Expo
- Hosted by: Nirina Zubir; Morgan Oey
- Official website: festivalfilm.id

Highlights
- Best Picture: Levitating
- Most awards: Ghost in the Cell (5)
- Most nominations: Ghost in the Cell (13)

Television coverage
- Network: TVRI World

The 46th Indonesian Film Festival ceremony, presented by Ministry of Culture and Indonesian Film Board, honored the achievements in Indonesian cinema released from 1 September 2025 to 31 August 2026. The ceremony was held on 20 November 2026.

== Winners and nominees ==
The nominations were announced on 12 October 2026 at the Produksi Film Negara headquarter in Jakarta, Indonesia, by Morgan Oey and Nirina Zubir.

Horror comedy film Ghost in the Cell received the most nominations with thirteen, followed by family drama film Na Willa and supernatural drama Levitating with nine each. At age nine, Luisa Adreena became the youngest nominee for Best Actress in history.

Winners will be listed first, highlighted in boldface, and indicated with a double dagger (‡).

=== Awards ===
**Best Picture**: **Levitating – Siera Tamihardja, Iman Usman, and Amalia Rusdi**; Dopamine – Chand Parwez Servia and Mithu Nisar; Ghost in the Cell – Tia Hasibuan; Na Willa – Anggia Kharisma and Novia Puspa Sari; Operasi Pesta Copet – Ernest Prakasa, Dipa Andika, James Erlangga, and Iqbaal Ramadhan	**Best Director**: **Joko Anwar – Ghost in the Cell**; Bernardus Raka – Nobody Loves Kay; Edwin – Sleep No More; Kimo Stamboel – The Elixir; Wregas Bhanuteja – Levitating
**Best Actor**: **Abimana Aryasatya – Ghost in the Cell as Anggoro**; Angga Yunanda – Levitating as Bayu; Ardit Erwandha – Wait for Me to be Successful Later as Arga; Marthino Lio – Dance of the Damned as Darso; Nicholas Saputra – Twisted Fate as Rawa	**Best Actress**: **Meriam Bellina – Last Chance to Save as Retno**; Christine Hakim – Semua Akan Baik-Baik Saja as Wida; Luisa Adreena – Na Willa as Na Willa; Marsha Timothy – Twisted Fate as Dita; Shenina Cinnamon – Dopamine as Alya
**Best Supporting Actor**: **Aming – Ghost in the Cell as Tokek**; Didik Nini Thowok – Sleep No More as Maryati; Kristo Immanuel – Operasi Pesta Copet as Adut; Teuku Rifnu Wikana – Dopamine as Tarigan; Yoga Pratama – Ghost in the Cell as Six	**Best Supporting Actress**: **Kawai Labiba – Operasi Pesta Copet as Melodi**; Lydia Kandou – Ikatan Darah as Lastri; Maudy Ayunda – Levitating as Laksmi; Raihaanun – Semua Akan Baik-Baik Saja as Bintang; Sarah Sechan – Wait for Me to be Successful Later as Yuli
**Best Original Screenplay**: **Operasi Pesta Copet – Rino Sarjono and Edy Khemod**; Dopamine – Teddy Soeria Atmadja; Ghost in the Cell – Joko Anwar; Levitating – Wregas Bhanuteja, Defi Mahendra, and Alicia Angelina; Wait for Me to be Successful Later – Evelyn Afnilia	**Best Adapted Screenplay**: **Nobody Loves Kay – Johanna Wattimena and Bernardus Raka; based on the short film The Dream Chaser: Kairi's Untold Story**; Na Willa – Ryan Adriandhy; based on the novel by Reda Gaudiamo; Twisted Fate – Mouly Surya; based on the novel by Valiant Budi
**Best Cinematography**: **Ghost in the Cell – Ical Tanjung**; Dopamine – Vera Lestafa; Levitating – Gunnar Nimpuno; Na Willa – Yadi Sugandi; Semua Akan Baik-Baik Saja – Yudi Datau	**Best Editing**: **Operasi Pesta Copet – Aline Jusria**; Dopamine – Aline Jusria; Last Chance to Save – Hendra Adhi Susanto; Semua Akan Baik-Baik Saja – Cesa David Luckmansyah; Wait for Me to be Successful Later – Ryan Purwoko
**Best Visual Effects**: **Na Willa – David A. Widya P., Concetta CFX & Dalang Digital Studio**; Dance of the Damned – Gaga Nugraha Ramadhan; The Elixir – Mattebox Visualworks; Ghost in the Cell – Abby Eldipie and Kalvin Irawan; Sleep No More – Bintang Adi Pradana and Harris Reggy	**Best Sound**: **Na Willa – Siti Asifa Nasution and Satrio Budiono**; The Elixir – Arief Budi Santoso and Fajar Yuskemal; Levitating – Sutrisno and Satrio Budiono; Semua Akan Baik-Baik Saja – Fery Setiawan; Wait for Me to be Successful Later – Waim Ahmad Fahreizi and Andre Harihandoyo
**Best Original Score**: **Nobody Loves Kay – Zeke Khaseli and Yudhi Arfani**; Dance of the Damned – Aria Prayogi and Rahadian Winursito; Ghost in the Cell – Aghi Narottama; Levitating – Yennu Ariendra; Twisted Fate – Zeke Khaseli and Yudhi Arfani	**Best Theme Song**: **"Kepala, Pundak, Kerja Lagi" from Sleep No More – Music, Lyrics, and Performed by Sal Priadi**; "Semua Akan Baik-Baik Saja" from Semua Akan Baik-Baik Saja – Music and Lyrics by Alvin Witarsa; Performed by Witarsa and Aquene Djorghi; "Sikilku Iso Muni" from Na Willa – Music and Lyrics by Arya Aditya Ramadhya, Ilman Ibrahim Isa, and Anindyo Baskoro; Performed by Luisa Adreena and Azamy Syauqi; "Tandeman" from Operasi Pesta Copet – Music, Lyrics, and Performed by Ipang Lazuardi; "The Town Was Gone" from Ghost in the Cell – Music and Lyrics by Tony Dwi Setiaji and Joko Anwar; Performed by Tony Merle
**Best Art Direction**: **Sleep No More – Menfo Tantono**; Ghost in the Cell – Dennis Sutanto; Ikatan Darah – Ahmad Zulkarnaen and Wahyu Efata; Levitating – Ong Hari Wahyu and Edy Wibowo; Na Willa – Rini Sri Handayani	**Best Costume Design**: **Na Willa – Astrid Rosiana Ishak**; Dance of the Damned – Gemailla Gea Geriantiana; Ghost in the Cell – Monika Paska; Operasi Pesta Copet – Gizza Ossiatzki; Sleep No More – Muthiara A. Revana
**Best Makeup**: **Ghost in the Cell – Novie Ariyanti**; Dance of the Damned – Gunawan Saragih, Prio Prabu, and Cherry Wirawan; The Elixir – Astrid Sambudiono and Albasirun Ucok; Ikatan Darah – Aktris Handradjasa; Sleep No More – Eba Sheba	**Best Live Action Short Film**: **Erased from the Map – Maarij Reka and Nabila Maharani Ribusari**; Amelia, Amelia – Daphne, Anandita Devitarianti, and Amalia Rusdi; Mothers Are Mothering – Khozy Rizal, Lam Li Shuen, Yulia Evina Bhara, and Amerta Kusuma; A Night as Long as Breath – Irwan Sebleku and Elsy Grazia; αLPα – Dhiwangkara Seta and Tia Sukma Sari
**Best Documentary Feature**: **A Distorted Individual – Adythia Utama**; I Saw Her in Motion – Umi Lestari; The Last Supper (Whisper) – Daniel Rudi Haryanto, Rolando Octavio Purba, and Yolinda Puspitarini; Planet of Love – Ika Wulandari and John Badalu; Tonggo Gedhek – Gama Triono and Tonny Trimarsanto	**Best Documentary Short Film**: **Sharp Objects – Taufiqurrahman Kifu and Hattie Wade**; Discordia – Dery Prananda and Nur Hidayah Perwitasari; Mom Minding the Mosque – Gladhys Elliona and Dewangkoro Rinugroho; Murdijati Gardjito – Hindra Setya Rini; Sino – Gilang Akbar, Kezia Hapsari, and Torra Buana
**Best Animated Short Film**: **Enigma Wajah Arca – Kresensia Adellitha Devalia**; Calabai – Gina Korompot; Drowned in Internet – Naufal Zhorif Aryawan and Nita Virena Nathania; Nyanyian di Angkringan – Shafiyyah Aida and Yansen Emanuel Irawan; Stories of Sahaba: Talhah Ibn Ubaydullah-The Living Martyr – Bony Wirasmono and Taufik Ramadhan	**Tanete Pong Masak Award for Best Film Critic**: **Yulaika Romadhani for Tirto – "Kerja-Kerja Sineas Mengekalkan Politik Dinasti di Abadi Nan Jaya"**; Anton Kurnia for Borobudur Writers – "Melankolia dalam Aruna dan Lidahnya; Gladhys Elliona – "Antara Adat dan Aparat: Menyisir Spiritualitas dan Represi di Kabut Berduri (2024)"; I Ngurah Gede Adi Putra for Rahadi.art – "Tubuh dan Ruang Yang Hilang dalam Pangku"; Soni Triantoro – "Dunia Setinggi Mata Na Willa"

=== Special awards ===
**Antemas Award**: **Agak Laen: Menyala Pantiku!**	**Kartini Award for Best Child Actor**: **Luisa Adreena – Na Willa as Na Willa**
**Lifetime Achievement Awards**: **Ida Farida**; **Putu Wijaya**

=== Audience awards ===
**Nya' Abbas Akup Award for Favorite Film**: **Levitating**
**Rachmat Hidajat Award for Favorite Actor**: **Saputra Kori – Jangan Buang Ibu as Tria**	**Mieke Widjaja Award for Favorite Actress**: **Shenina Cinnamon – Dopamine as Alya**

== Films with multiple nominations and awards ==
Films that received multiple nominations (excluding audience awards)
Nominations	Film
13	Ghost in the Cell
9	Levitating
9	Na Willa
7	Operasi Pesta Copet
7	Sleep No More
6	Dopamine
6	Semua Akan Baik-Baik Saja
5	Dance of the Damned
5	Wait for Me to be Successful Later
4	The Elixir
4	Twisted Fate
3	Ikatan Darah
3	Nobody Loves Kay
2	Last Chance to Save
