= List of 2026 box office number-one films in Indonesia =

This is a list of films which placed number one at the weekly box office for the year 2026 in Indonesia with the weekly admissions.

== Number-one films ==
†	This implies the highest-grossing movie of the year.

#	Weekend end date	Film	Weekly admissions	Weekend openings in the Top 10	Ref.
1	4 January 2026	Avatar: Fire and Ash	1,254,202	Dusun Mayit (#4); Risky Business 2 (#5); The Housemaid (#10)	
2	11 January 2026	Avatar: Fire and Ash	461,127	Greenland 2: Migration (#5); Uang Passolo (#8); Malam 3 Yashinan (#9); Comedy Buddy (#10)	
3	18 January 2026	Alas Roban	756,375	Unexpected Family (#3); The Last Flight (#5)	
4	25 January 2026	Alas Roban	591,127	Papa Zola The Movie (#2); Sengkolo: Petaka Satu Suro (#3); Mothernet (#5); Sebelum Dijemput Nenek (#6); Mercy (#10)	
5	1 February 2026	Alas Roban	355,018	Kuyank (#2); Kafir: The Spirit Gate (#3); Shelter (#5); Tuhan, Benarkah Kau Mendengarku? (#8)	
6	8 February 2026	Kuyank	273,346	Check Out Sekarang, Pay Later (Caper) (#6); Teman Tegar Maira (#8)	
7	15 February 2026	Kuyank	266,352	Goat (#4); Wuthering Heights (#5); Whistle (#6); Rumah Tanpa Cahaya (#7); AIUEO Macam Betool Aja (#10)	
8	22 February 2026	Kuyank	193,338	Blades of the Guardians (#2); Crime 101 (#6)	
9	1 March 2026	Panda Plan: The Magical Tribe	114,934	Scream 7 (#4); Titip Bunda di Surga-Mu (#5); Lift (#6); Marty Supreme (#10)	
10	8 March 2026	Hoppers	162,770	The Bride! (#8); The Draft! (#10)	
11	15 March 2026	Hoppers	209,216	Number One (#10)	
12	22 March 2026	Danur: The Last Chapter	616,380	Wait Until I Make It (#2); Suzzanna: Witchcraft (#3); Last Chance to Save (#5); Na Willa (#6); Pelangi di Mars (#7)	
13	29 March 2026	Danur: The Last Chapter	1,765,375	—N/a	
14	5 April 2026	Wait Until I Make It	871,274	The Super Mario Galaxy Movie (#3); Aku Harus Mati (#7); The Hostage's Hero (#8); David (#9); They Will Kill You (#10)	
15	12 April 2026	Ayah, Ini Arahnya ke Mana, Ya?	404,595	Project Hail Mary (#4); Warung Pocong (#9); The King's Warden (#10)	
16	19 April 2026	Ghost in the Cell	779,920	Suddenly Satan (#3); Lee Cronin's The Mummy (#4); Ready or Not 2: Here I Come (#6)	
17	26 April 2026	Ghost in the Cell	1,035,613	Levitating (#5); Michael (#7); Kupilih Jalur Langit (#8); Songko (#10)	
18	3 May 2026	Ghost in the Cell	787,544	Salmokji: Whispering Water (#2); Dilan ITB 1997 (#3); The Devil Wears Prada 2 (#6); Kupeluk Kamu Selamanya (#9)	
19	10 May 2026	Ghost in the Cell	423,463	Mortal Kombat II (#2); The Bell: A Call to Die (#8); Evil Eye (#9)	
20	17 May 2026	Project Sacrifice	644,709	Everything Will Be Fine (#2); Yang Lain Boleh Hilang Asal Kau Jangan (#5); Gohan (#7)	
21	24 May 2026	Project Sacrifice	535,951	Gudang Merica (#3); The Mandalorian and Grogu (#4); Keluarga Suami Adalah Hama (#7); Hokum (#10)	
22	31 May 2026	Five Friends 2: Mount Klawih	812,646	Children of Heaven (#2); Dance of the Damned (#4); My Husband, My Wound (#6); Passenger (#9)	
23	7 June 2026	Five Friends 2: Mount Klawih	589,482	Colony (#2); Nobody Loves Kay (#6); Sleep No More (#7); The Amazing Digital Circus: The Last Act (#9); Masters of the Universe (#10)	
24	14 June 2026	Colony	412,458	Warkop DKI: Viralin Doooong..!! (#3); Backrooms (#5); Disclosure Day (#7); Garuda: Dare to Dream (#8); Dosa (#9)	
25	21 June 2026	Toy Story 5	713,233	Cerita Lila (#2); The Furious (#6)	
26	28 June 2026	Jangan Buang Ibu	849,889	Supergirl (#4); Obsession (#5); Tanah Runtuh (#8)	
27	5 July 2026	Jangan Buang Ibu	1,330,689	Minions & Monsters (#2); Haunting of Mount Welirang (#4); Cinta Lama Babak Kedua - CLBK (#10)	
28	12 July 2026	Jangan Buang Ibu	834,999	Moana (#2); Foufo (#7); Korean Haunted Hospital (#8); Pemikat Jiwa (#10)	
29	19 July 2026	The Odyssey	542,068	Evil Dead Burn (#3); Cek Khodam (#5)	
30	26 July 2026	The Odyssey	658,708	Sihir Tanah Kubur (#4); Ip Man: Kung Fu Legend (#6)	
31	2 August 2026	Spider-Man: Brand New Day	3,149,284	Sajen Satu Suro (#3); Andai Waktu Bisa Diulang Lagi (#6)	
32	9 August 2026	Spider-Man: Brand New Day	2,193,306	Kado Untuk Ibu (#3); Deep Water (#4); Dear You (#6); Maju: Jejak Pahit Si Kembang Gula (#9)	
33	16 August 2026	Spider-Man: Brand New Day	874,162	The End of Oak Street (#2); Laddaland Housing Estate (#4); Kung Fu Soccer (#6); The Art of Seducing God (#7); Ketok Mejik (#9)	
34	23 August 2026	Insidious: Out of the Further	594,220	Harusnya Horror (#3); Mutiny (#4); Dan Bandung (#5); Dad, I Want to Talk (#9)	
35	30 August 2026	Insidious: Out of the Further	608,908	Operasi Pesta Copet (#4); Paket Santet (#5); Chiikawa the Movie: The Secret of the Mermaid Island (#9)	
36	6 September 2026	Munafik: Fighting Against the Devil	334,898	Baby Udon (#4); Autopsy Dead Body Can Talk (#9)	
37	13 September 2026	Agensi Rumah Tangga	430,108	Hope (#3); Suanggi: Ilmu Kutukan (#7); Detective Conan: Fallen Angel of the Highway (#8)	
38	20 September 2026	Resident Evil	492,045	Urang Bunian (#4); Istimewa (#5); Fall 2: Deadpoint (#6)	
39	27 September 2026	Avengers Endgame: Encore	606,905	Mother, What Would I Do Without You? (#2); Daniel and the Fiery Furnace (#5); Memburu Pemangsa (#6); Heart of the Beast (#7)	
40	4 October 2026	Mother, What Would I Do Without You?	464,607	Warga Rusun 609 (#3); Verity (#8); The Hole, 309 Days to the Bloodiest Tragedy (#9); Heart of the Beast (#7)	
41	11 October 2026	Dominion of Darkness: Rephaim	438,827	Other Mommy (#4); Hasut (#8)	
42	18 October 2026	Dominion of Darkness: Rephaim	410,404	Bapak Paling Jujur (#2); Street Fighter (#3); Whalefall (#7)	
43	25 October 2026	Dominion of Darkness: Rephaim	201,457	Pirunduk (#2); Clayface (#3); Lingsir Wengi: Motel Malioboro (#7); Siti Si Vampir (#10)	
44	1 November 2026	The Sea Speaks His Name	534,199	The Doll Ghawiah (#3); The Mongoose (#8)	
45	8 November 2026	The Sea Speaks His Name	481,586	Never Dies (#2); Godzilla Minus Zero (#3); Putri, Jangan Gentayangan Lagi (#4); GJLS: Berapi-Api (#5); Rambut Sewu: Satu Langkah Getih (#7)	
46	15 November 2026	Never Dies	339,261	A Bowl of Chicken Noodles Before I Die (#2); Ramayana: Part 1 (#4); The Serpent Spirit Goddess (#7); Lagi Probation: Kerja Ngejar Apa Sih? (#8)	

== Highest-grossing films ==
International film Indonesian film

Highest-grossing films of 2026 (In year release)
Rank	Title	Total admissions (as of 15 November)
1	Spider-Man: Brand New Day	6,977,396
2	Danur: The Last Chapter	3,619,565
3	Ghost in the Cell	3,376,865
4	Jangan Buang Ibu	3,356,577
5	Wait Until I Make It	3,008,239
6	Alas Roban	2,432,967
7	Toy Story 5	2,393,403
8	Five Friends 2: Mount Klawih	2,125,006
9	The Odyssey	2,024,056
10	Insidious: Out of the Further	1,694,493

== Milestones ==
=== Films exceeding one million admissions ===
International film Indonesian film

No.	Film	Date	Days	Total admissions (as of 15 November)	Ref.
1	Alas Roban	21 January 2026	13	2,432,967	
2	Kuyank	27 February 2026	30	1,225,998	
3	Danur: The Last Chapter	24 March 2026	7	3,619,565	
4	Wait Until I Make It	25 March 2026	8	3,008,239	
5	Suzzanna: Witchcraft	29 March 2026	12	1,530,071	
6	Na Willa	3 April 2026	17	1,400,271	
7	Last Chance to Save	5 April 2026	19	1,177,201	
8	Ayah, Ini Arahnya ke Mana, Ya?	20 April 2026	12	1,667,159	
9	Ghost in the Cell	21 April 2026	6	3,376,865	
10	Suddenly Satan	3 May 2026	18	1,219,543	
11	Project Sacrifice	22 May 2026	10	1,655,590	
12	Everything Will Be Fine	26 May 2026	14	1,168,135	
13	Five Friends 2: Mount Klawih	3 June 2026	7	2,125,006	
14	Colony	15 June 2026	13	1,470,990	
15	Toy Story 5	23 June 2026	7	2,393,403	
16	Jangan Buang Ibu	29 June 2026	5	3,351,616	
17	Cerita Lila	12 July 2026	25	1,004,835	
18	The Odyssey	25 July 2026	11	2,024,056	
19	Spider-Man: Brand New Day	29 July 2026	2	6,977,396	
20	Children of Heaven	4 August 2026	70	1,113,899	
21	Insidious: Out of the Further	28 August 2026	11	1,694,493	
22	Agensi Rumah Tangga	26 September 2026	17	1,254,346	
23	Resident Evil	5 October 2026	19	1,144,341	
24	Avengers Endgame: Encore	10 October 2026	18	1,078,789 (Note: 12,055,127 in total.)	
25	Mother, What Would I Do Without You?	11 October 2026	11	1,367,325	
26	Dominion of Darkness: Rephaim	25 October 2026	17	1,219,253	
27	The Sea Speaks His Name	8 November 2026	11	1,188,780	

=== Films exceeding two million admissions ===
No.	Film	Date	Days	Ref.
1	Alas Roban	10 February 2026	27	
2	Danur: The Last Chapter	28 March 2026	11	
3	Wait Until I Make It	1 April 2026	15	
4	Ghost in the Cell	29 April 2026	13	
5	Five Friends 2: Mount Klawih	26 June 2026	31	
6	Jangan Buang Ibu	4 July 2026	10	
7	Toy Story 5	4 July 2026	18	
8	Spider-Man: Brand New Day	1 August 2026	4	
9	The Odyssey	25 August 2026	42	

=== Films exceeding three million admissions ===
No.	Film	Date	Days	Ref.
1	Danur: The Last Chapter	5 April 2026	19	
2	Wait Until I Make It	3 May 2026	47	
3	Ghost in the Cell	10 May 2026	25	
4	Jangan Buang Ibu	12 July 2026	18	
5	Spider-Man: Brand New Day	2 August 2026	5	

=== Films exceeding four million admissions ===
No.	Film	Date	Days	Ref.
1	Spider-Man: Brand New Day	5 August 2026	8	

=== Films exceeding five million admissions ===
No.	Film	Date	Days	Ref.
1	Spider-Man: Brand New Day	9 August 2026	12	

=== Films exceeding six million admissions ===
No.	Film	Date	Days	Ref.
1	Spider-Man: Brand New Day	15 August 2026	18	

== See also ==
- List of highest-grossing films in Indonesia

Preceded by 2025	2026	Succeeded by 2027
