= Zee Asadel =

Indonesian singer (born 2004)

Azizi Asadel
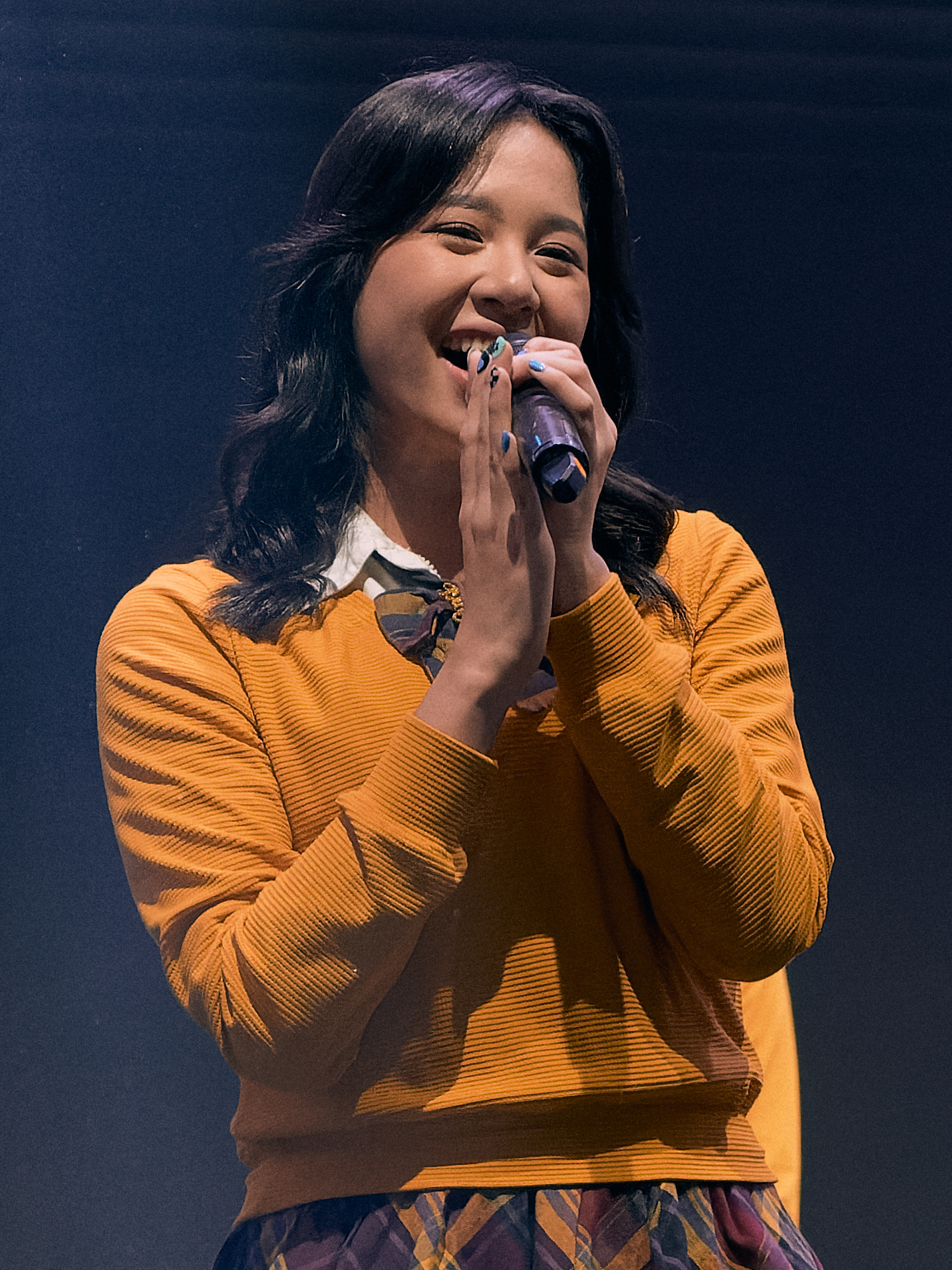
- Born: Azizi Shafaa Asadel; 16 May 2004 (age 22); Jakarta, Indonesia
- Other name: Zee JKT48 (2018–2024)
- Occupations: Celebrity; Singer; Dancer
- Years active: 2018–present
- Musical career
- Genres: Pop; J-pop
- Instruments: Vocal; Guitar
- Labels: Dentsu Inter Admark; HITS Records; Indonesia Musik Nusantara
- Formerly of: JKT48 (2018–2024)

Azizi Shafaa "Zee" Asadel (born 16 May 2004), is an Indonesian actress, singer, and dancer. She is a seventh generation member of the idol group JKT48, which was introduced in 2018.

== Early life ==
Born with the full name Azizi Shafaa Asadel, she is the first daughter of H. Fadli Akhmad and the niece of Fadlan Muhammad, who has Turkish blood. Both are twins who are famous as presenters and soap opera actors. She has 3 brothers and 1 sister; one of them is her twin brother, Akhmad Athir Ar-Raafi. Azizi Asadel's mother, Hj. Raden Roro Nur Ayu Chesty Maharani, is the ninth descendant of Adipati Mangkunegara I.

== Career ==
=== JKT48 ===
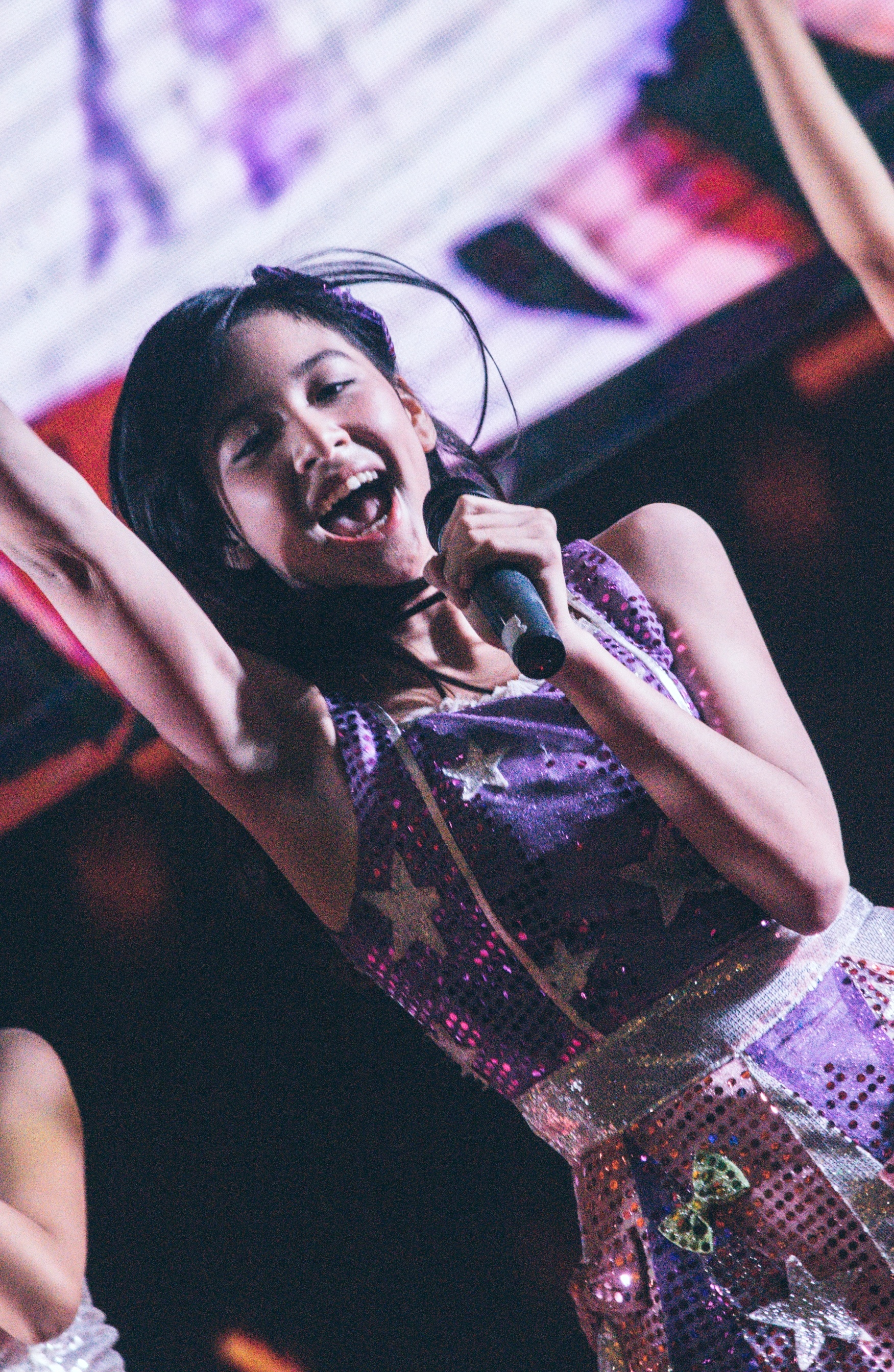
Zee JKT48 at the KAI Esports Exhibition, Goes to Jogja in 2019

Azizi Asadel started her career by joining JKT48 as a Class B Academy member, then Azizi Asadel was promoted to Class A on 28 October 2018. On 7 October 2019, she joined Team J until the team was merged into one on 14 March 2021, which resulted in no more Team J, KIII, T, or Academy, and makes Zee and the other JKT48 members together in one team. Aside from being a singer and dancer in JKT48, Azizi Asadel can also play guitar. She often performs solo by rendition of "Eureka Milik Kita" while playing the electric guitar.

Her popularity extends to e-commerce sectors, such as at the Shopee Live event, Azizi Asadel, in collaboration with Freya, successfully created an uproar throughout Indonesia. Furthermore, her appointment as the ambassador for Shopee's 8th anniversary solidified her standing in the industry.

In the JKT48 Ramadan event show "Anak King" on 7 April 2024, Azizi Asadel announced her graduation plan from the JKT48 group. In a post on her Instagram account, she admitted that it took a year before deciding on her graduation plan. On 24 July 2024, the JKT48 Operation Team announced the schedule for Azizi Asadel's graduation theatre show which will be held on 25 August 2024. On 24 August 2024, the JKT48 Operation Team announced that the procession of releasing Asadel's kabesha the profile photos of JKT48 members displayed at the JKT48 Theater would be held privately and could be watched live via the official JKT48 YouTube channel. On 25 August 2024, Asadel officially graduated from JKT48 after performing a graduation performance in the Theater Setlist Performance "Aturan Anti Cinta" at the JKT48 Theater.

=== Acting ===
Azizi Asadel made her acting debut in the 2022 Indonesian film, Kalian Pantas Mati, directed by Ginanti Rona. The film is a remake of the South Korean film, Mourning Grave (2014), which was directed by Oh In-chun.

In April 2023, Azizi Asadel and several other actors were announced as cast in the Ancika 1995 film, which will be based on the 2021 Pidi Baiq's novel, Ancika: Dia Yang Bersamaku Tahun 1995. The film directed by Benni Setiawan and is a part Dilan franchise. The film has been produced by Enam Sembilan Productions since 3 April 2023.

== Controversy ==
In mid-September 2022, Azizi Asadel and Indonesian celebrities (Raffi Ahmad, Angga Yunanda, Refal Hady, Gabriel Prince, Hassan Alaydrus, Uus, Iben MA, Raline Shah, Anya Geraldine, Enzy Storia, and Beby Tsabina) promoted Erigo fashion products in New York Fashion Week, US. However, after returning to Indonesia, a video circulated that she was suspected of smoking using a pod in the car, making fans feel disappointed with the viral video, even though her parents were carrying out the Umrah pilgrimage in Mecca and Medina, Saudi Arabia. Then at the "Teenage Girls" show at the JKT48 Theater on 25 September 2022, Azizi Asadel only apologised for the mistakes she had made, without being punished by the JKT48 Operation Team after clarifying with the management, and she was inactive on her social media until 10 October 2022.

== Discography ==
=== JKT48 ===
Key
‡	Indicates center position

Singles

Title	Year	Notes
"Cara Ceroboh Untuk Mencinta"	2021	
"Flying High"	2022	
"Sayonara Crawl"	2023	
"Magic Hour"	2024	Double center with Marsha Lenathea

Other songs

Title	Year	Album	Notes
"Bersama Kamu, Pelangi, dan Mentari"	2019	Joy Kick! Tears	Part of JKT48 Academy Class A
"Bukan PHO"	2021	—N/a	
"Only Today"	2021	This Is JKT48 New Era	
"Dialog Dengan Kenari"	2022	This Is JKT48 New Era	
"Feel The Fire"	2022	—N/a	Free Fire X JKT48
"Eureka Milik Kita"	2022	This Is JKT48 New Era	Solo performer
"Virgin Love"	2023	This Is JKT48 New Era	
"Ponytail dan Shu-Shu"	2023	—N/a	Double center with Angelina Christy
"Kebun Binatang Saat Hujan"	2023	—N/a	
"Eureka Milik Kita"	2023	Mahagita Vol. 2	
"Seventeen"	2023	Mahagita Vol. 2	
"New Ship"	2023	Mahagita Vol. 2	Double center with Angelina Christy
"Better"	2023	Mahagita Vol. 2	
"Mari Menjadi Pohon Sakura"	2023	Mahagita Vol. 2	
"Green Flash"	2023	Mahagita Vol. 2	
"Kita tak Akan Biarkan Mimpi itu Mati"	2023	Mahagita Vol. 2	Double center with Angelina Christy
"Jiwaru Days"	2023	Mahagita Vol. 2	
"Cinta, Persahabatan, dan Perjuangan"	2024	—N/a	Free Fire X JKT48

== Filmography ==
=== Film ===
Key
†	Denotes productions that have not yet been released

Year	Title	Role	Notes
2022	Kalian Pantas Mati	Dini / Windy	
2024	Ancika: Dia yang Bersamaku 1995	Ancika Mehrunisa Rabu	
2026	Jangan Seperti Bapak	Angel	
2026	Danur: The Last Chapter	Riana Rizki (Riri)	
2026	Kupilih Jalur Langit	Amira Hayatunnisa	
2026	Garuda di Dadaku		Voice
2026	Filosofi Teras †	Runi	
TBA	Diary Pramugari: Seks, Cinta, & Kehidupan †	Jingga	

- TBA: To be announced

=== Web series ===
Year	Title	Role	Notes
2021	Film Pendek Profil Pelajar Pancasila	Zee	4 episodes
2024	Happy Birth-Die	Zahpira Diamantina / Zee	8 episodes
2024	Sekotengs	dr. Maudy Subrata	6 episodes
2024	Apose: Boss Baru	Zee	
2027	Jagal Begal †	Sinta	

- TBA: To be announced

=== Music Video ===
Year	Title	Singer	Notes
2024	"Saat Ingin Denganmu"	The Panasdalam Bank dan Chintya Gabriella	
2024	"Setia"	Dikta Wicaksono	

=== Television ===
Year	Title	Role	Notes
2024	Indonesian Celebrity Sports Tournament	Participant	Season 3

== Awards and nominations ==
Year	Award	Category	Results
2022	Maya Awards	Best Newcomer Actress (Tuti Indra Malaon award)	Nominated
2024	Amazing Kids Favorite Awards	Favorite Indonesian Actress	Won
2025	Amazing Kids Favorite Awards	Favorite Indonesian Actress	Nominated
