= Toru Kubota =

Japanese documentary filmmaker

- 久保田徹
- Born: 1996 (age 29–30); Yokohama City, Kanagawa, Japan
- Education: Keio University
- Occupations: Filmmaker; Videographer; Director; Cameraman

Toru Kubota (久保田 徹, Kubota Tōru; born 1996) is a Japanese documentary filmmaker.

His works focuses on immigration and refugee issues, and he has collaborated with media outlets including BBC, NHK World and Al Jazeera.

In July 2022, he was arrested by the State Administration Council while filming in Yangon, and sentenced to 10 years, but released after 111 days of detention.

== Career ==
Toru Kubota was born in Yokohama, Kanagawa Prefecture 1996.

In 2014, while studying political science at Keio University, he began interviewing Rohingya refugees in Japan and went on to make documentary films.

He studied documentary at a graduate school in London from 2019, but dropped out the following year. In March 2020, he returned to Japan due to the influence of the new coronavirus.

He made the documentary TV film Tokyo Ritornello (東京リトルネロ (Tōkyō Ritorunero)) for NHK BS1, in 2020, and the documentary I Want to Know the Truth in 2022.

He directed, filmed, and edited the documentary "Borderline Resisters"(境界の抵抗者たち (Kyōkai no Teikōshatachi)), which portrays the lives of Myanmar media workers operating along the Thai border. The film was broadcast as an NHK BS Special in July 2024.

== Arrest in Myanmar ==
On July 30, 2022, Kubota was arrested by security authorities while covering and filming a Myanmar coup protest demonstration in Yangon. The Japanese government requested Kubota's early release, but he was sentenced to three years on sedition charges and seven years for violating an electronic communications law.

Rights groups such as PEN International and Reporters without Borders pushed for his freedom.

On November 17, he was released under a military amnesty and returned to Japan the next day. He was one of four foreign prisoners freed, including Australian economist Sean Turnell, former UK ambassador Vicky Bowman, and US citizen Kyaw Htay Oo. The military media said they were released for humanitarian and diplomatic reasons.

== Docu Athan ==
After returning to Japan, Kubota and journalist Yūki Kitazumi who also had experienced being detained by the Myanmar military, started the project "Docu Athan" to support journalists in Myanmar. The organisation operates a community base in Mae Sot, on the Thai-Myanmar border, that offers free camera rentals to Myanmar refugees and providing technical training in filmmaking and journalism.

== Awards and nominations ==
- 2016: Light up Rohingya, AFP Award, United for Peace Film Festival (UFPFF)
- 2020: Tokyo Ritornello, "Galaxy Honors" for programs recommended
- 2025: Resisters in Borderland (境界の抵抗者たち), the Best New Director Award from ATP (Association of All Japan TV production Companies)
- 2025: My Camera, My Gun, TAICCA X CNC Award from the Taiwan Creative Content Fest.
