= Na Willa =

2026 Indonesian film

- Promotional poster
- Directed by: Ryan Adriandhy
- Written by: Ryan Adriandhy
- Based on: Na Willa: Serial Catatan Kemarin by Reda Gaudiamo
- Produced by: Anggia Kharisma; Novia Puspa Sari
- Starring: Luisa Adreena; Irma Rihi; Junior Liem; Mbok Tun; Ira Wibowo; Melissa Karim; Freya Mikhayla; Azamy Syauqi; Arsenio Rafisqy; Putri Ayudya; Agla Artalidia
- Cinematography: Yadi Sugandi
- Edited by: Teguh Raharjo
- Music by: Ofel Obaja
- Production company: Visinema Studios
- Distributed by: Antenna Entertainment (Malaysia)
- Release date: March 18, 2026 (Indonesia)
- Running time: 118 minutes
- Country: Indonesia
- Language: Indonesian

Na Willa is a 2026 Indonesian musical family drama film written and directed by Ryan Adriandhy in his live-action film directorial debut. The film was based on the children's book Na Willa: Serial Catatan Kemarin by Reda Gaudiamo, which was first published in 2012.

Na Willa was released in Indonesia on 18 March, coinciding with the 2026 Eid al-Fitr holidays.

== Premise ==
Set in an alley on the outskirts of Surabaya in the 1960s, the story follows Na Willa, a six-year-old girl who navigates everyday life through her innocent and curious perspective. Living in a multicultural family with a mother from East Nusa Tenggara and a father of Chinese descent, Na Willa experiences childhood moments that reflect themes of growth, cultural diversity, and social change.

== Cast ==
- Luisa Adreena as Na Willa
- Irma Rihi as Marie, Na Willa's mother
- Junior Liem as Paul, Na Willa's father
- Freya Mikhayla as Farida
- Azamy Syauqi as Dul
- Arsenio Rafisqy as Bud
- Ira Wibowo as Mrs. Chang
- Mbok Tun as Mbok
- Melissa Karim as Cik Mien
- Putri Ayudya as Ms. Tini
- Agla Artalidia as Ms. Djuwita
- Nayla D. Purnama as Martini
- Fanny Fadillah as Farida's father
- Sita Nursanti as Farida's mother
- Ratna Riantiarno as Ms. Hermin
- Calvin Jeremy as Ahmadi
- Kafin Sulthan as Salim
- Fita Anggriani as Maryati
- Nana Mirdad as Titiek
- Kawai Labiba as Suryani
- Muzakki Ramdhan as Fadli
- Muhammad Adhiyat as Rahman
- Ankatama Ruyatna as Bud's mother
- Nissy Meinard as nurse
- Hifdzi Khoir as Martini's husband
- Anizabella Lesmana as Qur'an tutor

== Production ==
=== Pre-production ===
Visinema Studios announced the film in November 2025 as an adaptation of the first book of the Na Willa trilogy by Reda Gaudiamo. Jumbo's director Ryan Adriandhy is set to direct and wrote the film. Adriandhy stated that he chose live-action to capture the nostalgia and realism of 1960s Surabaya more in-depth.

Anggia Kharisma and Novia Puspa Sari served as producers on the film. The studio stated that the adaptation would remain faithful to key elements of the source material, including the characters' multicultural background.

=== Principal photography ===
Principal photography started on the second week of November 2025. The visuals were designed to recreate the 60s with a warm and detailed approach to the house and alley setting.

== Release ==
Na Willa was released simultaneously in theatres across Indonesia on 18 March 2026, coinciding with the 2026 Eid al-Fitr holidays.

== Accolades ==
Award / Film Festival	Date of ceremony	Category	Recipient(s)	Result	Ref.
Festival Film Bandung	22 August 2026	Highly Commended Art Direction	Rini Sri Handayani	Won	
Festival Film Bandung	22 August 2026	Highly Commended Original Score	Ofel Obaja	Won	
Indonesian Film Festival	20 November 2026	Best Picture	Anggia Kharisma and Novia Puspa Sari	Pending	
Indonesian Film Festival	20 November 2026	Best Actress	Luisa Adreena	Pending	
Indonesian Film Festival	20 November 2026	Best Adapted Screenplay	Ryan Adriandhy	Pending	
Indonesian Film Festival	20 November 2026	Best Cinematography	Yadi Sugandi	Pending	
Indonesian Film Festival	20 November 2026	Best Visual Effects	David A. Widya P., Concetta CFX, and Dalang Digital Studio	Pending	
Indonesian Film Festival	20 November 2026	Best Sound	Siti Asifa Nasution and Satrio Budiono	Pending	
Indonesian Film Festival	20 November 2026	Best Theme Song	Arya Aditya Ramadhya, Ilman Ibrahim Isa, and Anindyo Baskoro for "Sikilku Iso Muni"	Pending	
Indonesian Film Festival	20 November 2026	Best Art Direction	Rini Sri Handayani	Pending	
Indonesian Film Festival	20 November 2026	Best Costume Design	Astrid Rosiana Ishak	Pending	
