= Shenina Cinnamon =

Indonesian actress (born 1999)

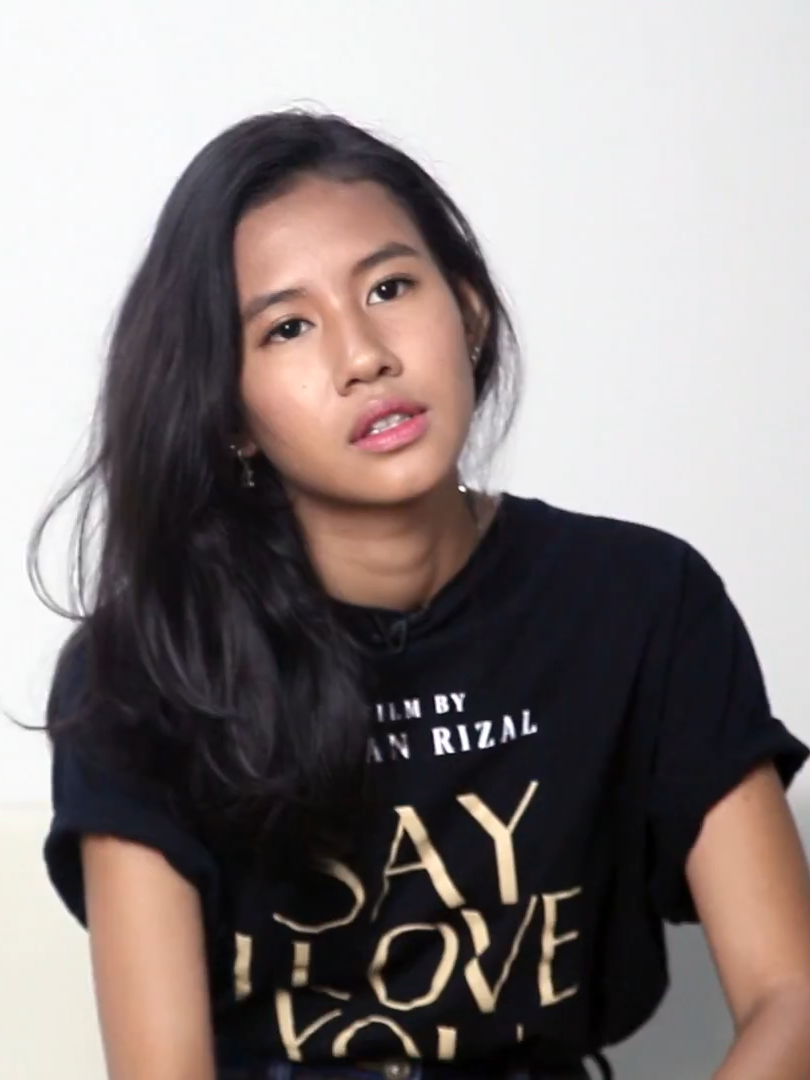
- Shenina Cinnamon in 2019
- Born: Shenina Syawalita Cinnamon; February 1, 1999 (age 27); Jakarta, Indonesia
- Occupation: Celebrity
- Spouse: Angga Yunanda (m. 2025)

Shenina Syawalita Cinnamon (born 1 February 1999) is an Indonesian actress. She made her lead role debut in Photocopier, which also led her being nominated for the Citra Award for Best Actress at the 2021 Indonesian Film Festival.

== Early life and career ==
Shenina Syawalita Cinnamon born on 1 February 1999. She is the daughter of Indonesian scriptwriter, film producer, and director Harris Cinnamon and Fitri Aulia Adnans of Minangkabau descent.

Shenina Cinnamon made her debut as an actress through various television film titles and through her role as Yasmin in Roman Picisan: The Series. The opportunity to play in feature films began to be obtained through Tumbal: The Ritual in 2018. Since then, her name has been taken into account in several prestigious film titles such as The Queen of Black Magic in 2019. 2021 was the year of Shenina Cinnamon's debut as the main actor through Photocopier which also led her being nominated for the Citra Award for Best Actress at the 2021 Indonesian Film Festival.

== Personal life ==
She is now married to Angga Yunanda since February 2025.

== Filmography ==
=== Film ===
Year	Title	Role	Director	Notes
2018	Tumbal: The Ritual	Maya	Tema Patrosza	Feature film debut
2018	Rompis	Jasmine	Monty Tiwa	
2019	Sabyan: Menjemput Mimpi	Lala	Amin Ishaq	
2019	Say I Love You	Dilla	Faozan Rizal	
2019	The Queen of Black Magic	Rani	Kimo Stamboel	
2019	Hanya Manusia	Dinda	Tepan Kobain	
2020	Di Bawah Umur	Marsya	Emil Heradi	
2021	Geez & Ann	Tari	Rizki Balki	
2021	Photocopier	Suryani	Wregas Bhanuteja	Lead role debut
2021	Kukira Kau Rumah	Dinda	Umay Shahab	
2023	The Prize	Si Mar	Paul Agusta	
2023	Dear David	Laras	Lucky Kuswandi	
2024	24 Hours with Gaspar	Agnes	Yosep Anggi Noen	
2024	Tale of the Land	May	Loeloe Hendra	
2025	Dopamine	Alya	Teddy Soeria Atmadja	

=== Television ===
Year	Title	Role	Network(s)
2017	Roman Picisan: The Series	Yasmin	RCTI
2020	Star Stealer	Jennifer	VIU
2021	I Love You Silly	Mira	WeTV iflix
2022	Blood Curse	Atika Ayu Winarsih	Disney+ Hotstar
2026	Night Shift for Cuties	Muti	Netflix

== Awards and nominations ==
Year	Award	Category	Work	Result
2021	Indonesian Film Festival	Best Actress	Photocopier	Nominated
