= Geez & Ann =

2021 Indonesian film

- Release poster
- Directed by: Rizki Balki
- Written by: Cassandra Massardi; Adi Nugroho
- Based on: Geez & Ann by Nadhifa Allya Tsana
- Produced by: Raam Punjabi
- Starring: Junior Roberts; Hanggini; Roy Sungkono
- Production company: MVP Pictures
- Distributed by: Netflix
- Release date: 25 February 2021
- Running time: 105 minutes
- Country: Indonesia
- Language: Indonesian

Geez & Ann is a 2021 Indonesian film produced by MVP Pictures for Netflix, based on the novel of the same title by Nadhifa Allya Tsana. It was directed by Rizki Balki, written by Cassandra Massardi and Adi Nugroho, and starring Junior Roberts, Hanggini and Roy Sungkono.

== Cast ==
- Junior Roberts as Gazza Cahyadi / Geez
- Hanggini as Keana Amanda / Ann
- Roy Sungkono as Bayu
- Shenina Cinnamon as Tari
- Ashira Zamita as April
- Amel Carla as Natha
- Farhan Rasyid as Rifky
- Naimma Aljufri as Thalia
- Andi Viola as Ayla
- Jasmine Elfira as Hana
- Davina Karamoy as Dina
- Ady Sky as Fachri
- Ersa Mayori as Ann's Mother
- Bobby Samuel as Ann's Brother
- Dewi Rezer as Geez's Mother

== Release ==
It was released on February 25, 2021 on Netflix streaming.
