= Danur: The Last Chapter =

- Promotional poster
- Directed by: Awi Suryadi
- Screenplay by: Lele Laila
- Story by: Adam Ripp; Paul Todisco
- Based on: Characters by Risa Saraswati
- Produced by: Manoj Punjabi
- Starring: Prilly Latuconsina; Zee JKT48; Dian Nitami; Dito Darmawan; Lewis Robert
- Cinematography: Arfian
- Edited by: Azka Amar Kusuma; Handoko Nama
- Music by: Ricky Lionardi
- Production company: MD Pictures
- Release date: March 18, 2026 (Indonesia)
- Running time: 98 minutes
- Country: Indonesia
- Language: Indonesian

Danur: The Last Chapter is a 2026 Indonesian horror film written by Lele Laila from the story by Adam Ripp and Paul Todisco, and directed by Awi Suryadi. Serving as a sequel to Danur: I Can See Ghosts (2017), Danur 2: Maddah (2018), and Danur 3: Sunyaruri (2019). It is the fourth and final instalment in the Danur franchise. It stars Prilly Latuconsina, Zee JKT48, and Dian Nitami.

The film premiered on 18 March 2026, coinciding with the 2026 Eid al-Fitr holidays. As of May 2026, it has become the highest‑selling film in Indonesia this year.

== Plot ==
After years of closing herself off from the spirit world, Risa tries to live a normal life free from supernatural disturbances. Her peace is shattered when her younger sister, Riri, begins acting strangely after an engagement at an old theatre. As Riri's behaviour spirals out of control, seemingly overtaken by a dark force, Risa experiences terrifying visions that hint at a hidden message from her ghostly friends, Peter and company. To save her sister, Risa must confront the past she tried to forget and reopen the Danur gate with the help of her spectral companions.

== Cast ==
- Prilly Latuconsina as Risa Saraswati
- Zee JKT48 as Riana Rizki / Riri, Risa's sister
- Dian Nitami as Elly
- Dito Darmawan as Dimas
- Lewis Robert as Peter Van Gils
- Muhammad Fauzan as William Van Kemmen
- Ayden Jeffrey as Hans Joseph Weel
- Said Darian as Hendrick Konnings
- Fillio Dheno as Jantje Heinrich Janshen
- Anya Zen as Canting
- Gilang Devialdy as Farid
- Fajar Nugra as Dadang
- Pritt Timothy as Burhan
- Dini Vitri as Eti
- McDanny as Asep
- Yovi Saddan as Raka
- Elvito as Erni

== Release ==
Danur: The Last Chapter was released simultaneously in theatres across Indonesia on 18 March 2026, coinciding with the 2026 Eid al-Fitr holidays. The film was part of the Eid al-Fitr line‑up, released alongside five other Indonesian titles. The film debuted at number one on the Indonesian box office, selling 616,380 tickets in its opening week, followed by 1,765,375 tickets in the second week. It ultimately finished with a total of 3,619,493 tickets sold.

== See also ==
- List of 2026 box office number-one films in Indonesia
