= Sean Turnell =

Australian economist and academic

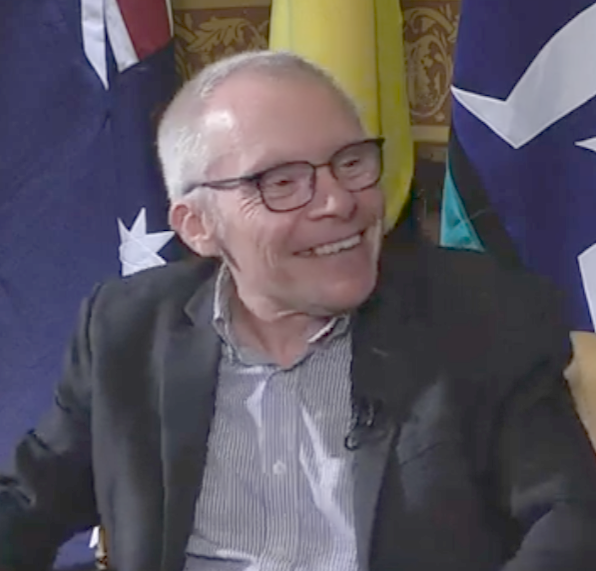
- At the launch of An Unlikely Prisoner in 2023

Academic background
- Education: Macquarie University

Academic work
- Institutions: Reserve Bank of Australia; Macquarie University, Sydney; Myanmar Development Institute
- Main interests: Development economics in Asia
- Notable works: Fiery Dragons: Banks, Moneylenders and Microfinance in Burma (2009)
- Notable ideas: Support for the development of the Myanmar economy

Sean Turnell is an Australian economist and former economic policy advisor to State Counsellor Aung San Suu Kyi in Myanmar. He is also an honorary professor of economics at Macquarie University, a former staff member of the Reserve Bank of Australia, and the director of research at the Myanmar Development Institute.

In 2009, the Nordic Institute of Asian Studies published his book on key periods in the history of Myanmar's financial sector, Fiery Dragons: Banks, Moneylenders and Microfinance in Burma.

Turnell was under detention in Myanmar between February 2021 and November 2022 for 650 days, charged with breaching the Myanmar Official Secrets Act while working in an advisory capacity to Aung San Suu Kyi.

== Early life and education ==
Turnell was raised in Macquarie Fields, a working-class suburb of Sydney. Turnell graduated with a Bachelor of Economics and a PhD degree from Macquarie University in Sydney.

== Professional background ==
He worked for a period as an analyst in the Reserve Bank of Australia before joining the Economics Department at Macquarie University in 1991. He has specialised in research on the Myanmar economy, as well financial sector reform in developing countries, the history of global monetary institutions, and the history of Australian economic research.

Turnell has published in numerous international journals on these and other topics including in the ASEAN Economic Review, Asian-Pacific Economic Literature, Asian Survey, Australian Economic History Review, and The Economic Record. He has also been widely cited in the media and has made many media appearances in Australia and internationally. In Australia, before his detention in Myanmar in February 2021, he frequently took part in seminars and other public discussions about the situation in Myanmar. In August 2020, while addressing the Australian Institute of International Affairs in Sydney, he discussed the evolving political situation in Myanmar and the role of the military in government in the country:

One of the most memorable queries of the night was whether he believed there was a possibility of the military seizing full control of the government again, which he did not rule out as impossible, although highly undesirable for the country's progress.

== 2021 Myanmar coup d'état ==
=== Detention in Myanmar ===
Turnell was detained in Yangon on 6 February 2021, in the aftermath of the 2021 Myanmar coup d'état, while he was working as an advisor to Aung San Suu Kyi. Turnell became the first foreign national known to be arrested in relation to the coup. Within a few days, the Australian government called for his immediate release. Australian Foreign Affairs Minister Marise Payne stated that Turnell:

… is a highly regarded adviser and member of the academic community in Australia ... We called in the Myanmar ambassador into the Department of Foreign Affairs and Trade to raise our concerns in relation to this, and we will continue to do that and press strongly for Professor Turnell's release.

The Vice-Chancellor of Macquarie University, Professor S. Bruce Dowton, also expressed deep concern about the detention of Turnell and said that the university had "long supported his work and commitment in advising on the economic aspects of the emergence of the fledgling democracy in Myanmar." Shortly afterwards, on 15 February, the National Tertiary Education Union (NTEU) along with the Australian Council of Trade Unions (ACTU) issued a statement of support for Turnell. The National President of the NTEU, Alison Barnes, said that, "the NTEU calls for his immediate and unconditional release".

==== Charges and imprisonment ====
On 23 March, possible charges against Turnell were detailed for the first time. During a press conference, a spokesperson for the military government, Brigadier General Zaw Min Tun, said that Turnell was being investigated and faced two possible charges in connection with the accusation that he tried to flee the country with secret financial information following 1 February military takeover. The two offenses, under the national immigration and Official Secrets Act, carried imprisonment terms of five and seven years respectively.

At first, no information was available as to where Turnell was being held. In late April, it was reported that he was being detained in Insein Prison in Yangon where other political activists were being held.

In late May, reports suggested that State Counsellor Aung San Suu Kyi along with several of her advisers, including Turnell, were being charged under the Official Secrets Act of Myanmar which bans the possession or sharing of state information that is "useful to an enemy."

In early June, Aung San Suu Kyi appeared in a court in Naypyidaw. It was announced that she would face a total of five charges for certain specific offences plus a sixth charge under the Official Secrets Act. The charge under the Official Secrets Act had been filed separately in the Yangon Eastern District Court. At the same time, it was reported that Turnell along with several former ministers of planning and finance (Soe Win, Kyaw Win, and Sett Aung) also faced charges for violating the Official Secrets Act. Later, on 16 June, the Australian Government again pressed for Turnell's release when Vice Admiral David Johnston, the Vice Chief of the Australian Defence Force, spoke with the Deputy Commander-in-Chief of the Myanmar military, Vice Senior General Soe Win by telephone. At the same time, news reports suggested that Turnell had been transferred from jail in Yangon to Naypyitaw. Commenting on the situation, former Australian ambassador to Myanmar Nicholas Coppel said that, "For Sean Turnell and for other political detainees, the chances of a fair trial are close to zero." Coppel added, "The big fish is Aung San Suu Kyi and what they will be wanting to show is that she has betrayed secrets to a foreigner. They'll need Sean for that."

==== Location of trial ====
In September, it was confirmed that the venue for Turnell's trial had been moved from Yangon to Naypyitaw. In mid-September, one of the lawyers working with Aung San Suu Kyi, Kyi Win, said that the Myanmar Supreme Court had agreed to the move. A week later it was reported that on 23 September, Turnell had appeared in the Dekkhinathiri District Court in Naypyitaw along with three ousted Union ministers: U Kyaw Win (former planning minister), U Soe Win (former finance minister), and U Set Aung (former deputy planning and finance minister). They all appeared in court in full COVID-19 personal protection equipment. Aung San Suu Kyi appeared in the same session attending via video. It was reported that Turnell had been charged with two cases under the Immigration Act. His lawyers filed their power of attorney for the second charge at the hearing. The lawyer representing Aung San Suu Kyi, U Khin Maung Zaw, was reported as saying that the lawyers representing the accused asked that the court allow an in-person meeting with their clients and also applied for an interpreter to translate. The lawyers asked for the in-person meeting because the appearance in the court was the first time that they had seen their clients in person. The Irrawaddy reported that while previously, Turnell and the three former ministers had been held at Insein prison in Yangon, they were believed to be now being held at a jail in Naypyitaw. An additional problem which arose during the court hearing on 23 September was that Australian embassy officials were not permitted to attend the court session. An Australian embassy representative had travelled to Naypyitaw from Yangon but was denied access to the court. A spokesperson for the Australian Government stated: "We have registered our serious concerns with the Myanmar ambassador in Canberra, and senior representatives in Naypyidaw. The Australian Government has made it clear to Myanmar authorities our expectation that we receive timely advice on Professor Turnell's case, including court hearings. We have requested access to all future hearings."

=== Trial proceedings ===
In September, hearings in the trial of Turnell began to be held on a weekly basis (usually Thursdays) in the Dekkhina District Court in Naypyitaw presided over by Judge Ye Lwin The first few hearings were brief, proceeding for around 30 minutes or so. In early October it was reported that a court in Naypyitaw had ruled that it would not allow a translator to attend during court hearings. Turnell's lawyer, Ye Lin Aung, said the ruling forbidding a translator was issued at a pre-trial hearing in a special court in Nayptitaw. Ye Lin Aung said that the prosecution, citing security reasons, had asked that no translator be allowed and that the judge had agreed. "It is difficult for us without a translator for him at the court," Ye Lin Aung said. "I am going to discuss it with officials from the Australian Embassy." He added that Turnell appeared to be in good health and requested that he be sent some snacks and other articles.

In mid-October, Turnell's lawyer, Ye Lin Aung, noted that he had not yet had a chance to meet with Turnell for a private discussion and submitted a request to the judge to allow him to meet with Turnell alone. At the same time, the judge indicated that consideration was being given to the provision of a government-approved interpreter during the hearings.

==== After one year ====
On 6 February 2022, the anniversary of Turnell's arrest, there were various expressions of support for him from academic colleagues in Australia and from the Australian Government. The Australian Minister for Foreign Affairs, Senator Marise Payne, issued a "Statement on Professor Sean Turnell" commenting:

Australian Professor Sean Turnell was detained by the Myanmar military one year ago today. Professor Turnell's detention is unjust, and we reject the allegations against him. We once again call for Professor Turnell's immediate release so that he can return to Australia to be with his family and for his rights and welfare to be upheld. …… Consistent with basic standards of justice and transparency, we expect that Professor Turnell should have unimpeded access to his lawyers, and that Australian officials be able to observe his court proceedings.

The Minister also acknowledged the strong international support shown for Turnell and declared that, "We will continue to work with international partners -- and importantly, those in our region -- to press his case."

==== Support from new government in Australia ====
In May 2022, an Australian general election was held which resulted in the formation of a Labor Government led by Anthony Albanese as prime minister. Shortly afterwards, it was reported from Myanmar that there had been a significant development in the legal proceedings against Turnell as well as his co-defendants. According to reports from an unidentified legal official, on 5 June a court in Myanmar sitting in Naypyidaw ruled that the trial against Turnell would continue because in the view of the court, prosecutors had presented sufficient evidence against both Aung San Suu Kyi and other defendants (including Turnell) to justify continuation of the trial on charges of violating the official secrets act. According to the report, the legal official spoke on condition of anonymity because he was not authorised to release information. It was explained that under Myanmar law, a judge can order an end to a trial after the prosecution has presented its case if the case is found to not have merit. However, if the judge finds the prosecution case credible, the trial continues into a second phase in which the defence presents its case and a verdict is rendered. It was reported that in the coming weeks (i.e., apparently during June and July 2022), the court would hear defence arguments including a re-examination of the prosecution's witnesses. The unidentified legal official said that Turnell was being detained in a prison in Naypyidaw and appeared to be in good health.

In response to these developments, in Australia both Albanese and the new Foreign Minister, Penny Wong, issued statements. Prime Minister Albanese stated:

Sean Turnell should be released. That is the government's position. We will continue to make strong representations on that basis. What we see is unjustified and we see in Myanmar a trashing of human rights and of proper legal processes and Sean Turnell will continue to receive the full support of the Australian government for appropriate processes to take place, but he should be released.

On 10 June 2022, Foreign Minister Wong added:

The Australian Government rejects this week's court ruling in Myanmar against Australian Professor Sean Turnell. It is more than sixteen months since Professor Turnell was detained by the Myanmar military. He remains imprisoned in Myanmar, and we will continue to call for his immediate release. Professor Turnell has worked for Myanmar's economic development for many years and is internationally respected for this record. We will continue to advocate for Professor Turnell's interests and well-being and will not stop until he is safely back with his family.

In early August, the Acting Australian Prime Minister Richard Marles underlined the Australian Government's position by saying that the Government "would not rest" until Turnell was returned to Australia. Marles said that the Australian Government continued to "mull imposing sanctions" on Myanmar over the case of Turnell. However, when asked when the federal government would make a decision on any sanctions, Marles said, "All of that is a matter that's being worked through right now. Our concern in terms of engagement with Myanmar is to ensure the safe return of Professor Turnell to this country." Marles added that he couldn't provide details of the Australian consular assistance being provided to Professor Turnell.

==== Myanmar court verdict ====
At the end of September 2022 it was widely reported that on 29 September, a special court set up by Myanmar's military had sentenced Aung San Suu Kyi and Turnell to three years in prison for violation of the Official Secrets Act. According to local media reports, Aung San Suu Kyi had been on trial on multiple charges and, following the sentence imposed by the special court, now faced a total of 23 years in prison. The court conducted trials of Suu Kyi along with senior officials of her earlier deposed administration and Turnell behind closed doors and had not detailed the defendants' exact offences under the Secrets Act.

The Australian Foreign Minister, Senator Wong, responded to the Court's decision by expressing her deep concern and stated:

...Australia rejects the ruling in Myanmar against Professor Turnell and we continue to call for his immediate release. We do not accept the charges against him. I make the point that Professor Turnell has spent years of his life working to improve the economic conditions for the people of Myanmar. We will continue to take every opportunity to advocate strongly for him until he is returned to his family in Australia.

Commenting on the limited access that Australian Government officials in Myanmar had had to Turnell and to court proceedings, Wong stated:

...We sought consular access – we do know where he is being currently held. We have – we sought access to the court. Disappointingly and regrettably the Myanmar authorities did not permit it to occur.

Wong's call for Turnell's release followed similar appeals from other international figures. On 17 August, the UN Special Envoy for Myanmar, Noeleen Hayzer, requested Turnell's release when she met with State Administration Chairman, General Min Aung Hlaing, in Naypyidaw. A similar appeal had been made by the Prime Minister of Cambodia, Hun Sen, without effect.

=== Release ===
As part of a mass amnesty for National Victory Day, Turnell was one of four foreign prisoners (including Vicky Bowman, Toru Kubota, and Kyaw Htay Oo), alongside 5,774 other prisoners who were released on 17 November 2022. Having spent 650 days in custody, Turnell was deported on 17 November and returned to Australia the following day. In 2023, he published An Unlikely Prisoner: How an Eternal Optimist Found Hope in Myanmar’s Most Notorious Jail, recounting his post-coup detention in Insein Prison.

== Personal life ==
Turnell is married to Ha Vu, a Vietnamese Australian economics lecturer. His nephew is Blake James Turnell, known as Chillinit, a rapper from Sydney.

== See also ==
- 2021 Myanmar coup d'etat
- Human rights in Myanmar
