= Sleep No More (film) =

2026 film by Edwin

- Promotional poster
- Indonesian: Monster Pabrik Rambut
- Directed by: Edwin
- Screenplay by: Edwin; Eka Kurniawan; Daishi Matsunaga
- Produced by: Meiske Taurisia; Muhammad Zaidy
- Starring: Rachel Amanda; Lutesha; Iqbaal Ramadhan
- Cinematography: Akiko Ashizawa
- Edited by: Daniel Hui
- Music by: Hiroyuki Nagashima
- Production companies: Palari Films; Giraffe Pictures; Hassaku Lab; In Good Company; Apsara Films
- Release dates: 14 February 2026 (Berlinale); 4 June 2026 (Indonesia)
- Running time: 96 minutes
- Countries: Indonesia; Singapore; Japan; Germany; France
- Language: Indonesian

Sleep No More (Indonesian: Monster Pabrik Rambut) is a 2026 fantasy horror film directed by Edwin from a screenplay he wrote with Eka Kurniawan and Daishi Matsunaga. An Indonesian-Singaporean-Japanese-German-French international co-production, the film stars Rachel Amanda, Lutesha, and Iqbaal Ramadhan.

The film had its world premiere at the Berlinale Special Midnight section of the 76th Berlin International Film Festival on 14 February 2026. It was theatrically released in Indonesia on 4 June 2026.

== Premise ==
Factory owner Maryati exploits her employees with excessively long shifts, luring them with incentives to make them prioritise productivity and greed over sleep. Putri is convinced that, because of this, her mother, who worked in the factory, committed suicide.

Her sister Ida, however, believes that their mother died from being possessed. She thinks that whenever the workers grow weak from exhaustion, a dark and evil figure emerges and takes possession of their bodies. To prove her theory, Ida decides to work day and night in the factory so that she, too, will become possessed and can see for herself the being that she believes seized their mother’s body.

The sisters have a younger brother, Bona, who was born with a special gift that enables his wounds to heal quickly whenever he is injured. As the sisters investigate their mother’s death, a ghostly figure searching for an ideal body seeks to take advantage of Bona’s gift, putting him in danger.

The three siblings must confront their own weaknesses, find strength in their faith, and fight to overcome the terror that threatens their family.

== Cast ==
- Rachel Amanda as Putri
- Lutesha as Ida
- Iqbaal Ramadhan as Bona
- Sal Priadi as Rudi
- Luqman Hakim (Kev) as Tohar
- Didik Nini Thowok as Maryati

== Production ==
In November 2023, the project participated in the Taiwan Creative Content Fest. In November 2024, it was announced that the film had been in production along with its cast announcement, including Rachel Amanda, Lutesha, Iqbaal Ramadhan, Sal Priadi, and acting debut of TikTok creator Kev Luqman. Apart from starring, Ramadhan would also serve as an executive producer alongside Dian Sastrowardoyo, the latter under her Beacon Film banner. Atsuko Ohno of Hassaku Lab and Anthony Chen of Giraffe Pictures would serve as co-producers. In December 2024, the project received a €50,000 production grant from Berlinale's World Cinema Fund. In May 2025, it was reported that Showbox had acquired the film's international sales rights and would present the project at Marché du Film. It was also announced that Roshanak Behesht Nedjad of German production company In Good Company would serve as a co-producer. Phoenix Films, Imajinari, Culture Entertainment, Jagartha, Trinity Entertainment Network, Mod Films, dr.M, and TIX ID financed the film.

Principal photography took place in November 2024 at the Produksi Film Negara building, East Jakarta, Indonesia.

== Release ==
Sleep No More had its world premiere at the 76th Berlin International Film Festival at the Berlinale Special Midnight section. The film was initially set for Indonesian theatrical release in 2025. It was eventually theatrically released in Indonesia on 4 June 2026.

The film held its Asian premiere at the Hong Kong International Film Festival and Belgian premiere at Brussels International Fantastic Film Festival in April 2026.

The film was showcased in the Southeast Asian Frontiers section of the 25th New York Asian Film Festival on 25 July 2026 and had its U.S. Premiere.

It was screened in the Panorama section of the 59th Sitges Film Festival on 17 October 2026.

The film will be screened for Japanese Premiere on 3 November 2026 in the World Focus section of the 39th Tokyo International Film Festival.
