= Sekotengs =

Indonesian medical drama television series

- Genre: Medical drama; Romance; Comedy; Slice-of-life
- Created by: Frederica
- Based on: Sekotengs (webtoon) by Lifina
- Screenplay by: Deliesza Tamara
- Directed by: Razka Robby Ertanto
- Starring: Adipati Dolken; Abidzar Al-Ghifari; Arbani Yasiz; Giorgino Abraham; Zee JKT48; Della Dartyan; Tatjana Saphira; Ferry Salim; Alvin Adam; Willem Bevers; Ira Wibowo; Sarah Sechan; Piet Pagau; Wina Marrino; Enditha; Ade Herlina; Yessi Kenyang
- Country of origin: Indonesian
- Original language: Indonesia
- No. of seasons: 1
- No. of episodes: 6

Production
- Executive producers: Sri Hiroo Bharwani; Vinita Bharwani; Hb Naween
- Producer: Frederica
- Editor: Febby Gozal
- Camera setup: Multi-camera
- Production company: Falcon Pictures

Original release
- Network: Prime Video
- Release: 26 September – 10 October 2024

Sekotengs is an Indonesian television series produced by Falcon Pictures that aired from 26 September 2024 to 10 October 2024 on Prime Video. The series adapted from the Webtoon by Lifina with the same title. It stars Adipati Dolken, Abidzar Al-Ghifari and Arbani Yasiz. This series is about four handsome young doctors undergoing their internship at a hospital, and realizing that their chosen profession is a profession full of challenges.

== Plot ==
Raka, Ezra, Vino, and Dean are young prospective doctors who are undergoing internships. The four of them have different characters.

They also experience the twists and turns of life while doing internships at a hospital. The four men have dreams of becoming professional doctors.

Raka is known as a cool person who doesn't talk much. He has a soft heart and is very caring towards his friends and the environment around him.

Erza is a patient, cute, funny and sensitive person. He is known to be easily touched. Erza is closest to Raka.

Then there is Vino, the son of a conglomerate who is not interested in becoming a doctor, but he has to study medicine because of the wishes of his family who are descendants of doctors.

Vino is a lazy internship student and gets low grades. Even so, he feels proud of the results he gets.

Finally, Dean is a bookworm who studies diligently. He always carries out the tasks given. He is ambitious to complete all tasks according to the theory he has studied.

Even though they have different characters, the four of them are still friends. Of course, these differences in character often make them fight.

Their journey to becoming internship students is not easy. The life of this young doctor is always filled with laughter, tears and situations that are difficult to explain.

== Cast ==
=== Main ===
- Adipati Dolken as Raka Dewantara
- Abidzar Al-Ghifari as Ezra Gumilang
- Arbani Yasiz as Dean Putra
- Giorgino Abraham as Vino

=== Recurring ===
- Zee JKT48 as Maudy Subrata
- Della Dartyan as Dennisa
- Tatjana Saphira as Lifina
- Ferry Salim as Dr. Bima
- Alvin Adam as Dr. Marvin
- Willem Bevers as Asriel Ganie
- Nungki Kusumastuti as Dr. Mira
- Ira Wibowo as Dr. Vera
- Sarah Sechan as Dr. Ratna
- Piet Pagau as Prof. Triatmodjo
- Wina Marrino as Dr. Wina: Dean's mother
- Queen Lubis as Alya
- Enditha as Kim: Ezra's mother
- Ellen Marta as Ibu Alya
- Giselle Tambunan as Cassie
- Ade Herlina as Ibu Raka
- Yessi Kenyang as Ibu Pasien

== Production ==
=== Development ===
When the filming process began in Semarang, the makers asked for assistance from a professional doctor.
