= Dopamine (2025 film) =

2025 film by Teddy Soeria Atmadja

- Theatrical release poster
- Indonesian: Dopamin
- Directed by: Teddy Soeria Atmadja
- Written by: Teddy Soeria Atmadja
- Produced by: Chand Parwez Servia; Riza; Mithu Nisar
- Starring: Angga Yunanda; Shenina Cinnamon
- Cinematography: Vera Lestafa
- Edited by: Aline Jusria
- Music by: Ricky Lionardi
- Production companies: Starvision; Karuna Pictures
- Release dates: 26 October 2025 (Jakarta); 13 November 2025 (Indonesia)
- Running time: 94 minutes
- Country: Indonesia
- Language: Indonesian

Dopamine (Indonesian: Dopamin) is a 2025 Indonesian crime romance thriller film directed and written by Teddy Soeria Atmadja. The film stars real-life couple Angga Yunanda and Shenina Cinnamon.

It had its world premiere as the closing film of Jakarta Film Week on 26 October 2025. It was released in Indonesian theatres on 13 November 2025.

== Premise ==
A couple, facing financial difficulties, must navigate their lives after a stranger dies in their home, leaving behind a suitcase filled with money.

== Cast ==
- Angga Yunanda as Malik
- Shenina Cinnamon as Alya
- Anjasmara as Arief
- Teuku Rifnu Wikana as Tarigan

== Production ==
In July 2025, it was reported that Angga Yunanda and Shenina Cinnamon would star in their first film together following their marriage in February, with Teddy Soeria Atmadja attached as the director.

== Release ==
Dopamin had its world premiere as the closing film of the 2025 Jakarta Film Week on 26 October. It was released in Indonesian theatres on 13 November 2025. It garnered 158,339 admissions during its theatrical run. It competed for the Indonesian Screen Awards at the 20th Jogja-NETPAC Asian Film Festival.

== Accolades ==
Award / Film Festival	Date of ceremony	Category	Recipient(s)	Result	Ref.
Jogja-NETPAC Asian Film Festival	6 December 2025	Indonesian Screen Award for Best Cinematography	Vera Lestafa	Won	
Film Pilihan Tempo	26 January 2026	Film Pilihan Tempo	Dopamine	Nominated	
Film Pilihan Tempo	26 January 2026	Best Director	Teddy Soeria Atmadja	Nominated	
Film Pilihan Tempo	26 January 2026	Best Actor	Angga Yunanda	Nominated	
Film Pilihan Tempo	26 January 2026	Best Supporting Actor	Teuku Rifnu Wikana	Nominated	
Festival Film Bandung	22 August 2026	Highly Commended Film	Dopamine	Nominated	
Festival Film Bandung	22 August 2026	Highly Commended Leading Actor	Angga Yunanda	Nominated	
Festival Film Bandung	22 August 2026	Highly Commended Leading Actress	Shenina Cinnamon	Nominated	
Festival Film Bandung	22 August 2026	Highly Commended Screenplay	Teddy Soeria Atmadja	Nominated	
Festival Film Bandung	22 August 2026	Highly Commended Cinematography	Vera Lestafa	Won	
Festival Film Bandung	22 August 2026	Highly Commended Editing	Aline Jusria	Won	
Festival Film Bandung	22 August 2026	Highly Commended Original Score	Ricky Lionardi	Nominated	
Indonesian Film Festival	20 November 2026	Best Picture	Chand Parwez Servia and Mithu Nisar	Pending	
Indonesian Film Festival	20 November 2026	Best Actress	Shenina Cinnamon	Pending	
Indonesian Film Festival	20 November 2026	Best Supporting Actor	Teuku Rifnu Wikana	Pending	
Indonesian Film Festival	20 November 2026	Best Original Screenplay	Teddy Soeria Atmadja	Pending	
Indonesian Film Festival	20 November 2026	Best Cinematography	Vera Lestafa	Pending	
Indonesian Film Festival	20 November 2026	Best Editing	Aline Jusria	Pending	
