= Popbela.com =

Indonesian lifestyle website

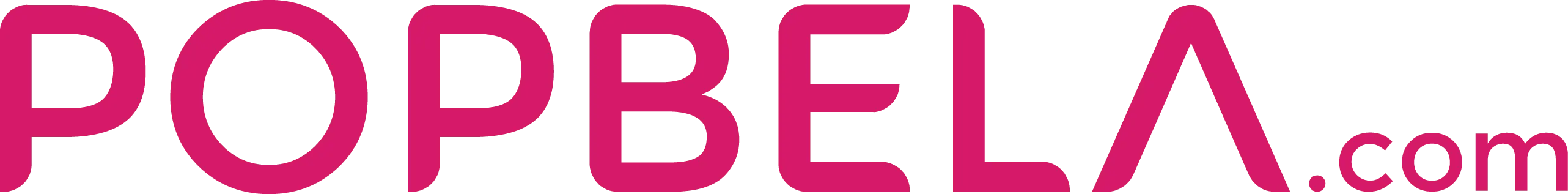
- Company type: Subsidiary
- Industry: Digital media
- Founded: 14 February 2016; 9 years ago
- Headquarters: Jakarta, Indonesia
- Area served: Indonesia
- Owner: IDN
- Website: www.popbela.com

Popbela.com is a multi-platform digital media owned by IDN focused on fashion, beauty, pop culture and lifestyle for young generation women in Indonesia.

== History ==
Popbela.com is a digital media that was launched on 14 February 2016, by Winston Utomo and William Utomo, Indonesian entrepreneurs and owners of IDN.

== Events ==
=== BeautyFest Asia ===
BeautyFest Asia is an annual beauty conference and exhibition organized by Popbela.com. BeautyFest Asia was held for the first time on 18–19 March 2017 at the Ciputra Artpreneur in Jakarta.

BeautyFest Asia 2023 was held in Jakarta on 2-4 June, 2023 at The Ritz-Carlton, Pacific Place, Jakarta with the theme "The Art of Play". Popbela.com also held BeautyFest Asia Surabaya 2023 in Surabaya at the Grand City Convex Exhibition Hall with the same theme.

=== Festival Pulih ===
The Festival Pulih is a mental health conference organized by Popbela.com. The event was organized virtually on 25–27 November 2021.

== See also ==
- Popmama.com
