= Tale of the Land =

2024 drama film

- Official poster
- Directed by: Loeloe Hendra
- Screenplay by: Loeloe Hendra
- Produced by: Yulia Evina Bhara; Amerta Kusuma
- Starring: Shenina Cinnamon; Arswendy Bening Swara; Angga Yunanda; Yusuf Mahardika
- Cinematography: Fahrul Tri Hikmawan
- Edited by: Carlo Francisco Manatad
- Music by: Teresa Barrozo
- Production company: KawanKawan Media
- Release dates: 4 October 2024 (BIFF); 11 November 2024 (QCinema)
- Running time: 99 minutes
- Countries: Indonesia; Philippines; Taiwan; Qatar
- Languages: Kutainese; Indonesian

Tale of the Land is a 2024 thriller drama film directed and written by Loeloe Hendra in his directorial debut, and starring Shenina Cinnamon, Arswendy Bening Swara and Angga Yunanda.

The film had its world premiere at the 29th Busan International Film Festival, where it won the FIPRESCI Award.

== Premise ==
An Indigenous Dayak girl lives in a floating house with her grandfather after losing her parents in a land conflict.

== Cast ==
- Shenina Cinnamon as May
- Arswendy Bening Swara as Tuha
- Angga Yunanda
- Yusuf Mahardika

== Production ==
The project participated in 2017 TorinoFilmLab.

The principal photography concluded in March 2024 in Kutai Kartanegara Regency, East Kalimantan. The project received post-production grant from Doha Film Institute.

== Release ==
Tale of the Land had its world premiere at the 29th Busan International Film Festival on 4 October 2024, competing for the New Currents. The film won the FIPRESCI Award.

== Accolades ==
Award / Film Festival	Date of ceremony	Category	Recipient(s)	Result	Ref.
Busan International Film Festival	11 October 2024	New Currents	Loeloe Hendra	Nominated	
Busan International Film Festival	11 October 2024	FIPRESCI Award	Loeloe Hendra	Won	
QCinema International Film Festival	13 November 2024	Best Lead Performance	Shenina Cinnamon	Won (Note: Shared with John Lloyd Cruz for his performance in Moneyslapper.)	
Golden Horse Awards	23 November 2024	NETPAC Award	Tale of the Land	Nominated	
Film Pilihan Tempo	5 February 2025	Film Pilihan Tempo	Tale of the Land	Nominated	
Film Pilihan Tempo	5 February 2025	Best Director	Loeloe Hendra	Nominated	
Film Pilihan Tempo	5 February 2025	Best Screenplay	Loeloe Hendra	Nominated	
Film Pilihan Tempo	5 February 2025	Best Actor	Arswendy Bening Swara	Nominated	
Film Pilihan Tempo	5 February 2025	Best Actress	Shenina Cinnamon	Nominated	
Indonesian Film Festival	20 November 2025	Best Actor	Arswendy Bening Swara	Nominated	
