= Happy Birth-Die =

2025 Indonesian television show

- Genre: Drama; Fantasy
- Based on: Happy Birth-Die by Risma Ridha Annisa
- Screenplay by: Lynda Ulviana; Ummu Amalia Misbah
- Directed by: Kuntz Agus
- Starring: Natasha Wilona; Emir Mahira; Fadi Alaydrus; Zee JKT48; Shania Gracia; Dominique Sanda; Olivia Jensen; Badriyah Afiff; Arifah Lubai; Volland Humonggio; Sania Velova; Farell Akbar; Devi Lanni
- Composer: Joseph S. Djafar
- Country of origin: Indonesia
- Original language: Indonesian
- No. of seasons: 1
- No. of episodes: 8

Production
- Executive producers: Anthony Buncio; Sutanto Hartono; Monika Rudijono; Aron Levitz; David Madden; Dexter Ong
- Producer: Wicky V. Olindo
- Cinematography: Ayunki Hikmawan
- Editor: Greg Arya
- Camera setup: Multi-camera
- Running time: 45 minutes
- Production companies: Screenplay Films; Wattpad Studios

Original release
- Network: Vidio
- Release: 12 January – 23 February 2024

Happy Birth-Die is an Indonesian television series produced by Screenplay Films and Wattpad Studios which aired on 12 January 2024 to 23 February 2024 on Vidio based on the Wattpad story of the same title by Risma Ridha Annisa. It starring Natasha Wilona, Emir Mahira, and Fadi Alaydrus.

== Plot ==
A girl named Pijar always acts cold. Pijar likes to dress all in white, plus her pale face and rarely smiles have earned her the nickname "zombie."

Birthdays, which are full of joy, are actually hated by Pijar. It turns out Pijar's secret is being able to see the death of someone celebrating their birthday.

To break the curse, Pijar believes she must meet her true love. Meanwhile, Pijar is shunned by her friends because she tries to keep the curse a secret.

One day, Pijar has to deal with a boy named Heksa, who is quite popular at school and adored by the girls. Pijar and Heksa both don't like to interact with each other, but they have to perform together for a school event.

Eventually, Pijar and Heksa discover each other's secrets. It turns out that Heksa, who is perfect in the eyes of the girls at school, has a phobia of ghosts. With both having secrets, what will happen to Pijar and Heksa's relationship? What kind of man will be the one who will melt Pijar's heart and free her from the curse?

== Cast ==
- Natasha Wilona as Pijar
- Emir Mahira as Heksa
- Fadi Alaydrus as Andre
- Zee JKT48 as Zaphira Diamantina / Zee
- Shania Gracia as Alfa
- Olivia Jensen as Ghina Pratiwi
- Dominique Sanda as Tamara
- Badriyah Afiff as Ani
- Syamil Rasyid as Pete
- Arifah Lubai as Camel
- Mervinta Putri as Celine
- Volland Humonggio as Darmawan
- Sania Velova as Ninin
- Farell Akbar as Damar Saputra
- Devi Lanni as ibu Andre
