= Ryan Adriandhy =

Indonesian filmmaker and comedian (born 1990)

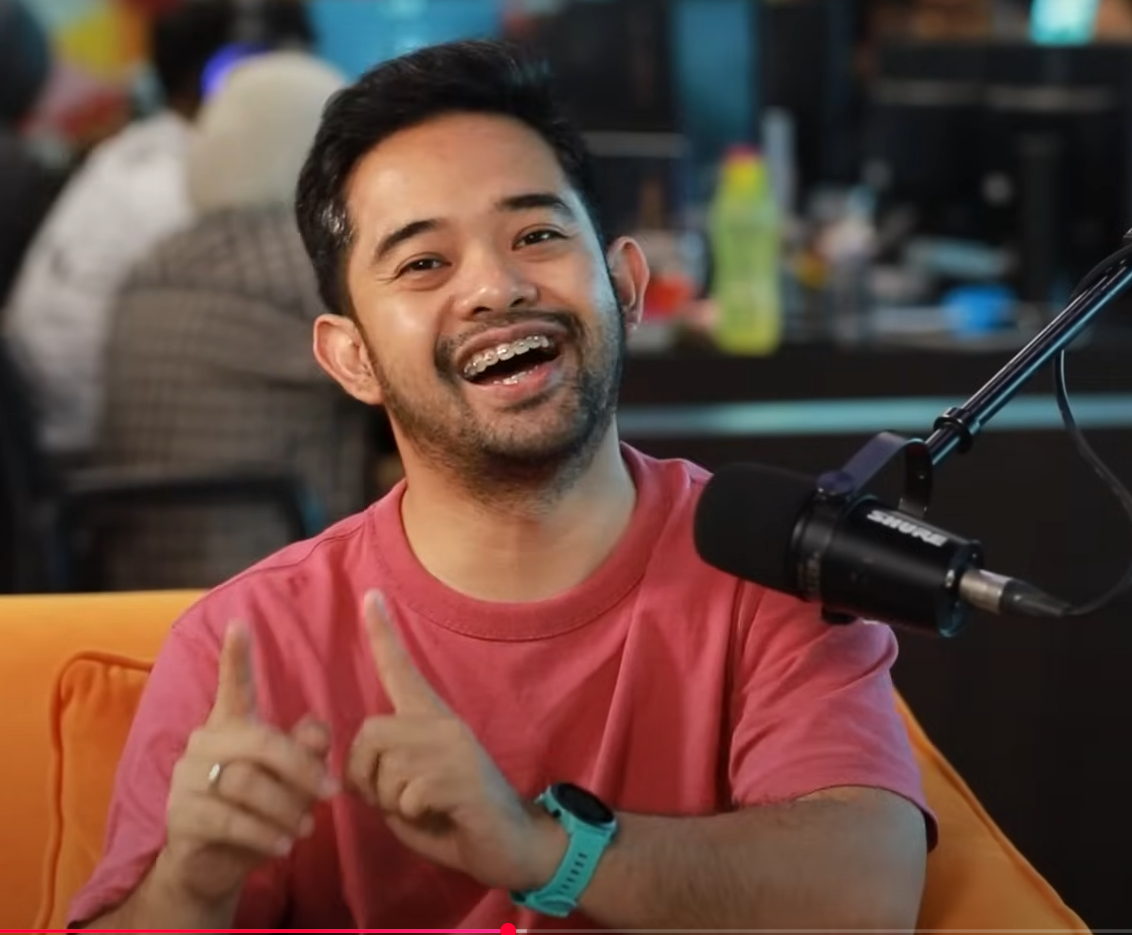
- Adriandhy in 2025
- Born: 15 June 1990 (age 36); Jakarta, Indonesia
- Occupations: Film director; animator; comedian; actor
- Years active: 2011–present
- Spouse: Anizabella Lesmana (m. 2021)

Ryan Adriandhy (born 15 June 1990) is an Indonesian film director, animator, stand-up comedian, and actor. He rose to prominence after winning the first season of Stand Up Comedy Indonesia in 2011. As a filmmaker, his directorial debut Jumbo (2025) became the highest-grossing Indonesian film of all time, before being surpassed by Agak Laen: Menyala Pantiku! months later.

== Early life ==
Ryan Adriandhy was born on 15 June 1990 in Jakarta as the only child of parents of Minangkabau descent. In 2012, he graduated from the Bina Nusantara University, majoring in Graphic Design and New Media. He received a Fulbright Program scholarship to pursue a Master of Fine Arts in Film and Animation at the Rochester Institute of Technology. He graduated in 2019.

== Career ==
Adriandhy won the first season of reality competition Stand Up Comedy Indonesia in 2011. He starred as Rian in Raditya Dika's mockumentary series Malam Minggu Miko (2012–2013). He made his feature film acting debut by reprising the role in comedy film Cinta dalam Kardus in 2013 and Malam Minggu Miko the Movie a year later. He then starred alongside former SDN48 member, Yuki Kimoto in the Metro TV television series Kokoro no tomo pop. He directed the animated short film Prognosis in 2020 as his graduation film, winning the Citra Award for Best Animated Short Film at the Indonesian Film Festival. After graduating, he joined the production company Visinema Pictures as the Head of Animation Development. In 2022, he created a children television's series Domikado and served as the narrator.

In March 2025, he released his feature debut directorial film, Jumbo on Eid al-Fitr weekend. It became the highest-grossing Indonesian film of all time in June 2025. The record was surpassed by Agak Laen: Menyala Pantiku! in January 2026. It also became the highest-grossing Southeast Asian animation film of all time. He received a Citra Award for Best Director nomination at the 2025 Indonesian Film Festival and Jumbo became the first animated film to receive a Citra Award for Best Picture nomination.

In 2026, he directed his first live action film, Na Willa, based on the novel of the same name by Reda Gaudiamo.

== Filmography ==
=== Film ===
Year	Title	Director	Writer	Notes
2020	Prognosis	Yes	Yes	Short film
2021	Nussa	No	No	As assistant producer
2025	Jumbo	Yes	Yes	
2026	Na Willa	Yes	Yes	

==== Acting ====
Year	Title	Role	Notes
2013	Cinta dalam Kardus	Rian	
2014	Malam Minggu Miko the Movie	Rian	
2021	Two Language and a Sausage	Ronny	Short film
2025	Jumbo	Mysterious caller	Voice

=== Television ===
Year	Title	Creator	Director	Writer	Network	Notes
2022	Domikado	Yes	Yes	Yes	YouTube	Also as narrator

==== Acting ====
Year	Title	Role	Network	Notes
2012–2013	Malam Minggu Miko	Rian	Kompas TV	
2014–2015	Kokoro no tomo pop	Tomo	Metro TV	
2021	Webseriesnya Radit	Rian	YouTube	Episode: "Baju Couple"
