= Prenjak =

- Directed by: Wregas Bhanuteja
- Written by: Wregas Bhanuteja
- Starring: Rosa Winenggar; Yohanes Budyambara; Hosea Hatmaji; Banyu Bening
- Release date: 2016
- Running time: 12 minutes
- Country: Indonesia
- Language: Javanese
- Budget: 3 million IDR

Prenjak is an Indonesian short film, written and directed by Wregas Bhanuteja. In 2016, it became the first Indonesian film to win an award at the Cannes Film Festival.

== Cast ==
The film stars Rosa Winenggar as Diah, Yohanes Budyambara as Jarwo, Hosea Hatmaji, and Banyu Bening.

== Production ==
Prenjak is a Javanese name for a species of bird in Yogyakarta. The shooting of the film took place for two days in Yogyakarta in February 2016. The film was directed by Wregas Bhanuteja. The other crews and casts were his friends. The editing process was done for a week. The budget of the film was 3 million rupiah that was from his friends in Studio Batu, his film community in Yogyakarta. Canon 5D Mark III was used as the camera.

The story is based on a local cultural practice that was popular in 1980s and 90s in Yogyakarta when a woman, seller of wedang rondhe (local drink) let a man to see her genital by lighting matches in darker place in alun-alun for money. In the film, the woman is a restaurant employee rather than a drink seller and the money was higher than the practice back then in accordance to a more modern context.

== Reception ==
Prenjak was registered to 2016 Cannes Film Festival three days before the closing. The film then won the Leica Cine Discovery Prize. The film is the first Indonesian film to win at the festival in any category. According to Femina, Charles Tesson praised Prenjak as "a film with a surprisingly deep poetry". Tesson, quoted by Rappler, added that the film is "dark and ornery, about how earning a living is the same as a game of matches." Rappler also quoted Marie-Paulline Molaret, one of the jury, said that "Bhanuteja got rid of bad impression of peeking and made it as an entertaining, soft poetry."

After winning the international festival, Prenjak was screened by Kinosaurus a micro-cinema in Jakarta. The film was also screened at Institut Francais Indonesia Jakarta on 2 June 2016.

Pangerang writing for Kompas identified Prenjak as black comedy, showing a sad story of a woman by simple jokes. Ratnaning writing for Liputan6.com claimed that its simplicity of "the plot, setting, and shooting technique" makes the film as natural and close to viewers.

== Awards ==
Prenjak won Best Short Film category at 2016 Indonesian Film Festival.
