= Wregas Bhanuteja =

Indonesian director and screenwriter

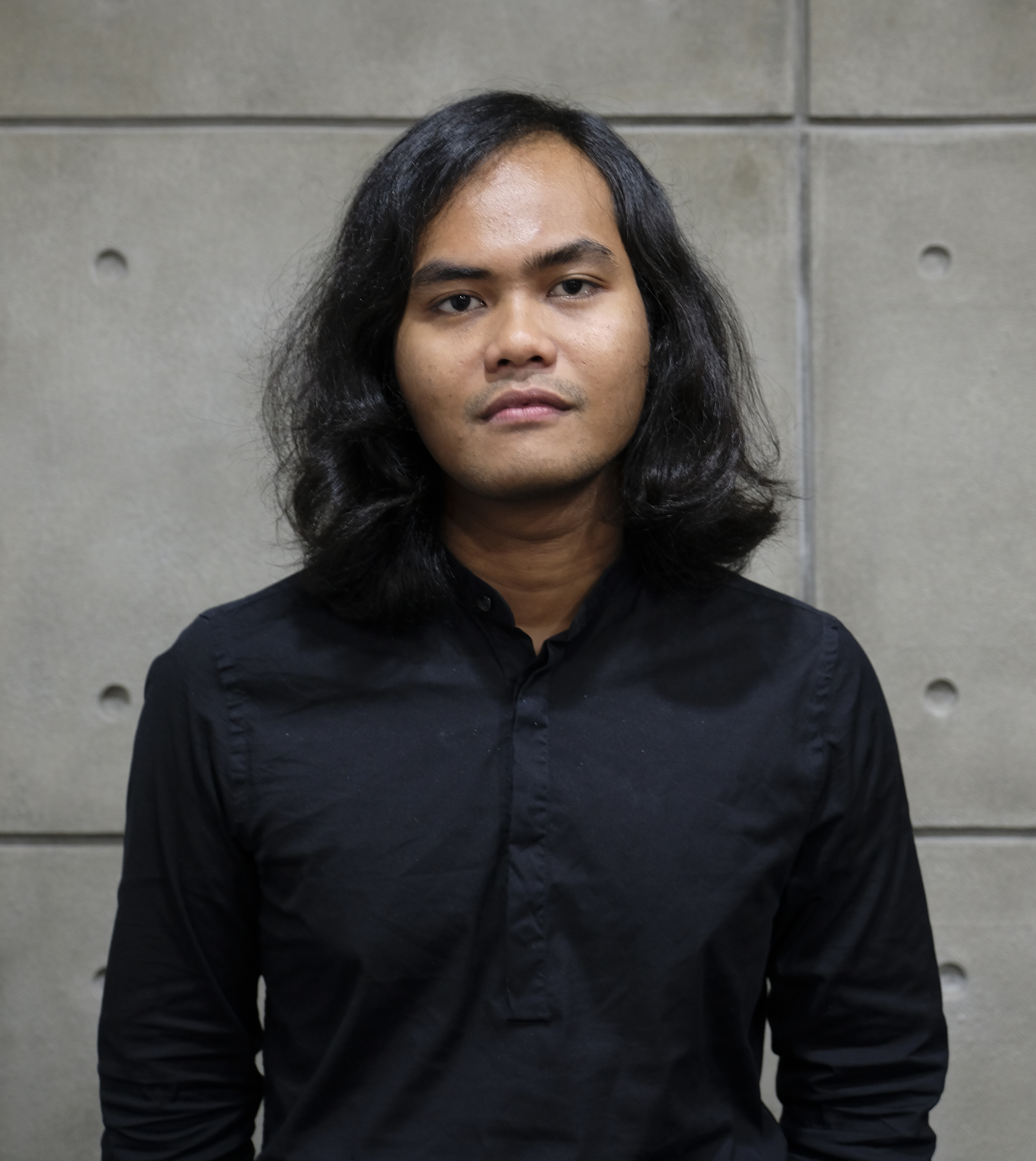
Raphael Bhanuteja

Raphael Wregas Bhanuteja is an Indonesian film director and screenwriter. In 2016, Wregas became the first Indonesian director to win an award at Cannes Film Festival, for his short film Prenjak.

== Biography ==
Wregas Bhanuteja was born in Yogyakarta and learned short film making in De Britto College High School Yogyakarta. After graduating high school in 2010, he attended the Faculty of Film and TV, Jakarta Institute of Arts, majoring in film directing.

During his study, Wregas produced several short films, including Senyawa (2012), shot on 16 mm celluloid film. In 2014, Wregas graduated from Jakarta Institute of Arts with his final project, a short film called Lemantun (2014) about a cupboard inherited by his grandmother. Lemantun attained several best short film awards, namely in XXI Short Film Festival 2015 and Indonesian Film Appreciation 2015.

In 2015, Wregas' short film Lembusura (2014), about the eruption of Mount Kelud, made into selection in the 65th Berlin International Film Festival 2015, competing in the section of Berlinale Shorts Competition. Wregas was named the youngest director in the festival at only 22 years old. After Berlin, he made another short film called The Floating Chopin (2015), an interpretation of the song Chopin Larung by Guruh Soekarno Putra.

In 2016, Wregas, in collaboration with Studio Batu Yogyakarta, wrote and directed Prenjak/In The Year Of Monkey (2016), a story of a woman who sells lighter in Yogyakarta. In The Year Of Monkey was selected in the 55th Semaine de la Critique, Cannes Film Festival 2016 and awarded Leica Cine Discovery Prize for short film. This has made Wregas the first Indonesian director to receive an award in Cannes Film Festival.

In 2019, Wregas made another short film titled Tak Ada Yang Gila Di Kota Ini/No One Is Crazy In This Town (2019). The film was selected to compete in Wide Angle: Asian Short Film Competition as a part of Busan International Film Festival held 3–12 October 2019 in Busan, South Korea. The film is an adaptation of a short story with the same title by Eka Kurniawan, telling the story of Marwan (cast by Oka Antara) who is instructed to exile people with mental disorders to the woods.

Bhanuteja's feature-length directorial debut, Photocopier, is set to premiere at the 26th Busan International Film Festival, in October 2021. The film tells the story of Sur, a college student who loses her scholarship as her drunk selfie circulates online. The director's new film, scheduled to be released in 2025, was announced in 2024; according to press releases and interviews, this horror film will star Angga Yunanda, Anggun C. Sasmi, Maudy Ayunda, Bryan Domani, Chicco Kurniawan, Indra Birowo, Ganindra Bimo, and Muhammad Asyrof Al-Ghifari; it will focus on a village where the people consider being possessed by spirits to be a source of shared satisfaction and pleasure.

== Filmography ==
=== Feature films ===
Year	Title	Director	Writer	Producer	Notes
2021	Photocopier	Yes	Yes	No	
2023	Andragogy	Yes	Yes	No	
2026	Levitating	Yes	Yes	No	
2026	Mate's Rate	No	No	Yes	

=== Short films ===
Year	Title	Director	Writer	Producer	Notes
2012	Senyawa	Yes	Yes	No	
2014	Lemantun	Yes	Yes	No	
2015	Lembusura	Yes	Yes	No	
2016	The Floating Chopin	Yes	Yes	No	
2016	Prenjak	Yes	Yes	No	
2017	Dry Season in My House	Yes	Yes	No	
2018	Warmest Regards from a Dog	Yes	Yes	No	
2019	No One Is Crazy in This Town	Yes	Yes	No	
