= Nobody Loves Kay =

2026 drama film by Bernardus Raka

- Directed by: Bernardus Raka
- Written by: Johanna Wattimena; Bernardus Raka
- Produced by: M. Faisal Hibatullah; Zhafran Solichin; Giovanni Rahmadeva; Nick Musa
- Starring: Bima Azriel
- Cinematography: Haryono Putra
- Edited by: Indra Sukmana
- Music by: Yudhi Arfani; Zeke Khaseli
- Production companies: Migunani Cinema Cult; QUN Films
- Release date: 4 June 2026 (Indonesia)
- Running time: 117 minutes
- Country: Indonesia
- Language: Indonesian

Nobody Loves Kay is a 2026 Indonesian coming-of-age drama film directed by Bernardus Raka in his directorial debut, from a screenplay he co-wrote with Johanna Wattimena. Inspired by the life of Kairi, the film follows a high school student on his journey to becoming a professional esports player. It stars Bima Azriel as the title character. It also stars Aurora Ribero, Rey Bong, Joshia Frederico, Ariyo Wahab, Mian Tiara, and Elly D. Lutan. It was theatrically released in Indonesia on 4 June 2026.

== Premise ==
Nobody Loves Kay follows Kay, a high school student who aspires to become a professional esports player.

== Cast ==
- Bima Azriel as Kay
- Aurora Ribero as Amanda
- Rey Bong as Ido
- Joshia Frederico as Aurelio
- Ariyo Wahab as Ignatius, Kay's father
- Mian Tiara as Ingrid, Kay's mother
- Elly D. Lutan as Kay's grandmother

== Production ==
In August 2025, reports emerged that production on a biographical film about professional esports player Kairi had been completed. In October 2025, the project participated at the Jakarta Film Week Net. At a press conference, Raka described his directorial debut as "honest". He stated that he aimed to highlight an individual's determination to pursue their dreams and to portray esports as "something deeper than just playing the game".

Principal photography had wrapped in August 2025.

== Release ==
Nobody Loves Kay was theatrically released in Indonesia on 4 June 2026.

== Accolades ==
Award / Film Festival	Date of ceremony	Category	Recipient(s)	Result	Ref.
Festival Film Bandung	22 August 2026	Highly Commended Film	Nobody Loves Kay	Nominated	
Festival Film Bandung	22 August 2026	Highly Commended Supporting Actor	Rey Bong	Nominated	
Festival Film Bandung	22 August 2026	Highly Commended Screenplay	Johanna Wattimena and Bernardus Raka	Won	
Festival Film Bandung	22 August 2026	Highly Commended Original Score	Yudhi Arfani and Zeke Khaseli	Nominated	
Jakarta Film Week	25 October 2026	Direction Award	Bernardus Raka	Won	
Indonesian Film Festival	20 November 2026	Best Director	Bernardus Raka	Pending	
Indonesian Film Festival	20 November 2026	Best Adapted Screenplay	Johanna Wattimena and Bernardus Raka	Pending	
Indonesian Film Festival	20 November 2026	Best Original Score	Yudhi Arfani and Zeke Khaseli	Pending	
