= Ghost in the Cell =

- Poster
- Directed by: Joko Anwar
- Written by: Joko Anwar
- Produced by: Tia Hasibuan
- Starring: Endy Arfian; Abimana Aryasatya; Yoga Pratama; Aming; Kiki Narendra
- Cinematography: Ical Tanjung
- Edited by: Joko Anwar
- Music by: Aghi Narottama
- Production companies: Come and See Pictures; Rapi Films; Legacy Pictures
- Distributed by: Well Go USA (America)
- Release dates: February 13, 2026 (Berlinale); April 16, 2026 (Indonesia); April 30, 2026 (Malaysia)
- Running time: 106 minutes
- Country: Indonesia
- Language: Bahasa Indonesia
- Box office: $135,375

Ghost in the Cell is a 2026 Indonesian supernatural comedy horror film written and directed by Joko Anwar. The film stars Endy Arfian, Abimana Aryasatya, Yoga Pratama, and Aming. The film was produced by Tia Hasibuan under the banner of Come and See Pictures and premiered at the Berlin International Film Festival on 13 February 2026, before being screened in Indonesian cinemas on 16 April 2026.

== Plot ==
The movie opens with journalist Dimas working late at night editing his latest article about an illegal nickel mining operation in Borneo, where several workers have died under mysterious circumstances. He then sends the finished article to his boss, who calls him into his office and harshly criticizes the article. He reveals that the paper is struggling economically and he thinks that covering the workers' deaths will undermine the paper's reputation as a serious economic publication, so he sharply orders Dimas to rewrite the article. After Dimas leaves, the boss has an argument with his wife on the phone, further worsening his mood. As he turns away from the windows, his reflection instead stays still, showing a disturbing figure. He is then killed by an off-screen figure stabbing him multiple times with his pen. Dimas's colleague then finds Dimas standing in the office, horrified, as his boss's corpse hangs from the celing fan.

The perspective then shifts to Labuhan Angsana prison, where the inmates live with daily problems, oppression from prison officials, as well as hostility and violence among fellow prisoners. We are introduced to the main characters of the movie: Anggoro, who keeps having time added to his sentence for standing up for other prisoners in front of prison guards; Six, who is not religious but is supposedly able to see ghosts; Wildan, a devout Muslim; Pendi, previously a professor; and their friend Irfan.

One day, Dimas arrives to the prison with a group of new inmates, after having been condemned for the murder of his boss. The day after, one of the most violent prisoners is alone in the showers when he sees a figure which looks like him except his face has no eyes and is instead covered in black dots. The figure attacks him and kills him, leaving him horribly mutilated in the showers. Shortly after, another prisoner dies a similar death after discovering that his wife has betrayed him.

Six reveals to the rest of the group that he can now see auras and that he saw the second prisoner's aura as red moments before he was killed. Wildan explains to the group that a red aura signifies a negative, angry mood, and the group figures out that there is a ghost in the prison, killing off prisoners with the most negative aura one by one. They then resolve to keep their aura positive by praying or practicing art such as dancing. One of the other prisoners hears this conversation, so the rumour that prisoners can avoid being killed by praying and dancing quickly spreads. After the prison's dance teacher is murdered by the ghost after angrily dismissing the lesson because the inmates were not paying attention, the prisoners realize that no matter how positive they keep their aura, there will always be one prisoner with the least positive aura who is going to get killed.

Anggoro then asks the other prisoners to work together in order to stop the ghost once and for all. They figure out that Dimas has brought the ghost with him from Borneo, where the workers were dying in very similar ways, being mutilated and hung to trees. They then speculate that the prisoners' deaths are just a way for the ghost to recharge itself, but it still has to find the person that it actually wants to kill, and that this person must be close to Dimas for the ghost to be able to kill them.

One of the guards reveals to the prisoners that in the politicians' block of the prison, where corrupt politicians live in luxurious single cells, there is one of the politicians responsible for the illegal mining operation that Dimas was investigating. The prisoners infiltrate the block, trying to get close to the politician. In order for the ghost to attack him though they have to make his aura negative, which the professor manages to do by calling him on the phone and reminding him of his early days as a young and honest politician, and pointing out how far he is from those ideals right now. The ghost finally attacks the politician, killing him, and the prisoners know that it is finally satisfied because Six can now see Dimas' aura as well, indicating that the ghost has left his body.

Six months later, Dimas says a final goodbye to the prisoners, as new CCTV footage has emerged which exonerated him from his boss' murder, as he was not in the room when it happened, and so he is leaving the prison as a free man. He tells them that he is going back to Borneo in order to bring the ghost back home.

== Cast ==
- Endy Arfian as Dimas
- Abimana Aryasatya as Anggoro
- Yoga Pratama as Six
- Mike Lucock as Wildan
- Danang Suryonegoro as Irfan
- Lukman Sardi as Pendi
- Kiki Narendra as Sapto
- Bront Palarae as Jefri
- Aming as Tokek
- Tora Sudiro as Anton
- Arswendy Beningswara as Prakasa
- Morgan Oey as Bimo
- Haydar Salishz as Donald
- Dewa Dayana as Prakasa muda
- Marissa Anita as istri Endy
- Rio Dewanto as Endy
- Radja Nasution as Bibin
- Almanzo Konoralma as Buki
- Faiz Vishal as Vijay
- Jaisal Tanjung as Bambang
- Ho Yuhang as Rendra
- Magistus Miftah as Novilham

== Release ==
Ghost in the Cell premiered at the 2026 Berlin International Film Festival before becoming a box office success in Indonesia following its local release on April 16, 2026.

== Reception ==
=== Critical response ===
The film received critical acclaim, achieving a 97% approval rating on Rotten Tomatoes based on 31 reviews.

Brian Tallerico of RogerEbert.com awarded 3 out of 4 stars and praised Joko Anwar's confident direction and dynamic camerawork, as well as Abimana Aryasatya's lead performance, calling the film an inventive and highly rewarding blend of prison drama and supernatural horror. John Lui of The Straits Times described Ghost in the Cell as a bloody horror-comedy, praising its mix of practical effects and dark humor and highlighted the film's use of a corrupt prison setting as a sharp political satire on Indonesian society and systemic inequality.

Shandy Pradana of IDN Times rated the film 4.5 out of 5 stars, calling it Joko Anwar's most daring film and praised its ensemble cast and fearless mix of dark slapstick comedy, extreme practical gore, and sharp socio-political commentary on institutional corruption. Gisella Keilsa of CNN Indonesia, rated the film 4 out of 5 and praised for its energetic blend of graphic horror, dark comedy, and social critique. The review noted that the prison setting effectively serves as an allegory for real-world corruption and systemic injustice, supported by solid ensemble performances and a compelling narrative style.

Agnes Veronica Lasut of Radio Republik Indonesia praised the film as an entertaining blend of horror, action and comedy and commended the film's strong pacing, dynamic cast chemistry and claustrophobic setting, noting how its supernatural elements deliver a subtle critique of societal flaws and human nature. Muhammad Saddam Amtael Soerawijaya of Popmama praised the film as a uniquely entertaining horror-comedy and highlighted its balance of supernatural scares and prison humor with relatable family themes, noting that beneath its gory premise lies a thought-provoking message on redemption, empathy and solidarity.
