= Operasi Pesta Copet =

2026 film by Edy Khemod

- Directed by: Edy Khemod
- Written by: Edy Khemod; Rino Sarjono
- Produced by: Ernest Prakasa; Dipa Andika; Iqbaal Ramadhan; James Erlangga
- Starring: Iqbaal Ramadhan; Kristo Immanuel; Kawai Labiba; Zulfa Maharani
- Cinematography: Dicky R. Maland
- Edited by: Aline Jusria
- Music by: Mar Galo; Ken Jenie
- Production companies: Imajinari; Angin Segar; Boss Creator
- Release date: 27 August 2026
- Running time: 113 minutes
- Country: Indonesia
- Language: Indonesian

Operasi Pesta Copet is a 2026 Indonesian crime comedy film directed by Edy Khemod in his directorial debut, from a screenplay he co-wrote with Rino Sarjono. The film stars Iqbaal Ramadhan, Kristo Immanuel, Kawai Labiba, and Zulfa Maharani as four young people who plot a pickpocketing scheme at the Pestapora music festival.

The film was released in Indonesian theatres on 27 August 2026. It received seven nominations at the 2026 Indonesian Film Festival, including Best Picture.

== Premise ==
Ijal loses his job while his mother is burdened with debt. He attempts to make ends meet by taking on odd jobs with his best friend, Adut. Facing financial difficulties, they recruit music fans Melodi and Tia to plan a pickpocketing operation at the Pestapora music festival.

== Cast ==
- Iqbaal Ramadhan as Ijal
- Kristo Immanuel as Adut
- Kawai Labiba as Melodi
- Zulfa Maharani as Tia

== Production ==
The idea of Operasi Pesta Copet originated when director Edy Khemod received news that a pickpocket had been caught at a music festival wearing merchandise from his band, Seringai. A clip of the film was shown during Pestapora 2025, introducing the film and its cast under working title Operasi Pesta Pora. In June 2026, the film title was changed to Operasi Pesta Copet. Producer Ernest Prakasa explained that the change was intended to make the film's context and central conflict easier for audiences to understand.

Principal photography took place in various locations in Jakarta, including on location during the Pestapora music festival in September 2025.

== Release ==
Operasi Pesta Copet was released in Indonesian theatres on 27 August 2026. It garnered 505,574 admissions during its theatrical run.

== Accolades ==
Award / Film Festival	Date of ceremony	Category	Recipient(s)	Result	Ref.
Indonesian Film Festival	20 November 2026	Best Picture	Ernest Prakasa, Dipa Andika, Iqbaal Ramadhan, and James Erlangga	Pending	
Indonesian Film Festival	20 November 2026	Best Supporting Actor	Kristo Immanuel	Pending	
Indonesian Film Festival	20 November 2026	Best Supporting Actress	Kawai Labiba	Pending	
Indonesian Film Festival	20 November 2026	Best Original Screenplay	Rino Sarjono dan Edy Khemod	Pending	
Indonesian Film Festival	20 November 2026	Best Editing	Aline Jusria	Pending	
Indonesian Film Festival	20 November 2026	Best Theme Song	Ipang Lazuardi for "Tandeman"	Pending	
Indonesian Film Festival	20 November 2026	Best Costume Design	Gizza Ossiatzki	Pending	
