= Levitating (film) =

2026 film by Wregas Bhanuteja

- Promotional poster
- Indonesian: Para Perasuk
- Directed by: Wregas Bhanuteja
- Written by: Wregas Bhanuteja; Defi Mahendra; Alicia Angelina
- Produced by: Siera Tamihardja; Iman Usman; Amalia Rusdi
- Starring: Angga Yunanda; Maudy Ayunda; Anggun; Bryan Domani; Chicco Kurniawan
- Cinematography: Gunnar Nimpuno
- Edited by: Ahmad Yuniardi
- Music by: Yennu Ariendra
- Production company: Rekata Studio
- Release dates: 24 January 2026 (Sundance); 23 April 2026 (Indonesia)
- Running time: 119 minutes
- Countries: Indonesia; Singapore; France
- Language: Indonesian

Levitating (Indonesian: Para Perasuk, lit. 'The Possessors') is a 2026 supernatural drama film directed by Wregas Bhanuteja from a screenplay he co-wrote with Defi Mahendra and Alicia Angelina. The film stars Angga Yunanda as a young man who aspires to be the shaman of a trance party. It also stars Maudy Ayunda, Anggun, Bryan Domani, and Chicco Kurniawan. It is an international co-production of Indonesia, Singapore, and France.

It had its world premiere on 24 January 2026 at the 2026 Sundance Film Festival, competing at the World Cinema Dramatic Competition section. It was theatrically released in Indonesia on 23 April 2026.

== Plot ==
Bayu dreams of becoming the shaman of a trance party in order to raise enough money to prevent his village from being evicted.

== Cast ==
- Angga Yunanda as Bayu
- Maudy Ayunda as Laksmi
- Anggun as Teacher Asri
- Chicco Kurniawan as Pawit
- Bryan Domani as Ananto
- Indra Birowo as Bayu's father
- Ganindra Bimo as Fahri
- Muhammad Asyrof Al-Ghifari as cafe visitor
- Aimee Janice as Bayu's cousin
- Buyung Ispramadi as the senior stargazer
- Ivonne Dahler as Mrs. Nana

== Production ==
In February 2024, it was reported that Wregas Bhanuteja would direct his third feature film, with Tan Si En of Momo Film Co serving as a co-producer. In August 2024, the cast of the film was announced, including Angga Yunanda, Maudy Ayunda, Bryan Domani, Chicco Kurniawan, Indra Birowo, Ganindra Bimo, and Anggun in her film acting debut. In September 2024, it was presented at the Asian Project Market, held during the Busan International Film Festival, where it won the CJ ENM Award. It was also reported that Patrice Nezan of French production company Les Contes Modernes would serve as a co-producer.

In March 2025, it was reported that Taiwan-based company Aview Images would co-produce the film during its slate announcement at the FilmArt. In May 2025, the project received a post-production grant from Purin Pictures.

KG Media, Masih Belajar Pictures, RVO Horizon and Anami Films financed the film.

Principal photography took place for twenty four days and had wrapped in October 2024.

== Release ==
Levitating had its world premiere on 24 January 2026, competing at the World Cinema Dramatic Competition section at the 2026 Sundance Film Festival. It was theatrically released in Indonesia on 23 April 2026.

== Accolades ==
Award / Film Festival	Date of ceremony	Category	Recipient(s)	Result	Ref.
Festival Film Bandung	22 August 2026	Highly Commended Film	Levitating	Nominated	
Festival Film Bandung	22 August 2026	Highly Commended Director	Wregas Bhanuteja	Nominated	
Festival Film Bandung	22 August 2026	Highly Commended Supporting Actor	Indra Birowo	Nominated	
Festival Film Bandung	22 August 2026	Highly Commended Screenplay	Wregas Bhanuteja, Alicia Angelina, and Defi Mahendra	Nominated	
Festival Film Bandung	22 August 2026	Highly Commended Original Score	Yennu Ariendra	Nominated	
Indonesian Film Festival	20 November 2026	Best Picture	Siera Tamihardja, Iman Usman, and Amalia Rusdi	Pending	
Indonesian Film Festival	20 November 2026	Best Director	Wregas Bhanuteja	Pending	
Indonesian Film Festival	20 November 2026	Best Actor	Angga Yunanda	Pending	
Indonesian Film Festival	20 November 2026	Best Supporting Actress	Maudy Ayunda	Pending	
Indonesian Film Festival	20 November 2026	Best Original Screenplay	Wregas Bhanuteja, Defi Mahendra, and Alicia Angelina	Pending	
Indonesian Film Festival	20 November 2026	Best Cinematography	Gunnar Nimpuno	Pending	
Indonesian Film Festival	20 November 2026	Best Sound	Sutrisno and Satrio Budiono	Pending	
Indonesian Film Festival	20 November 2026	Best Original Score	Yennu Ariendra	Pending	
Indonesian Film Festival	20 November 2026	Best Art Direction	Ong Hari Wahyu and Edy Wibowo	Pending	
Asian Academy Creative Awards	3 December 2026	Best Feature Film – Indonesia	Levitating	Won	
Asian Academy Creative Awards	3 December 2026	Best Actor in a Leading Role – Indonesia	Angga Yunanda	Won	
Asian Academy Creative Awards	3 December 2026	Best Actress in a Leading Role – Indonesia	Anggun	Won	
