= Indra Birowo =

Indonesian actor (born 1973)

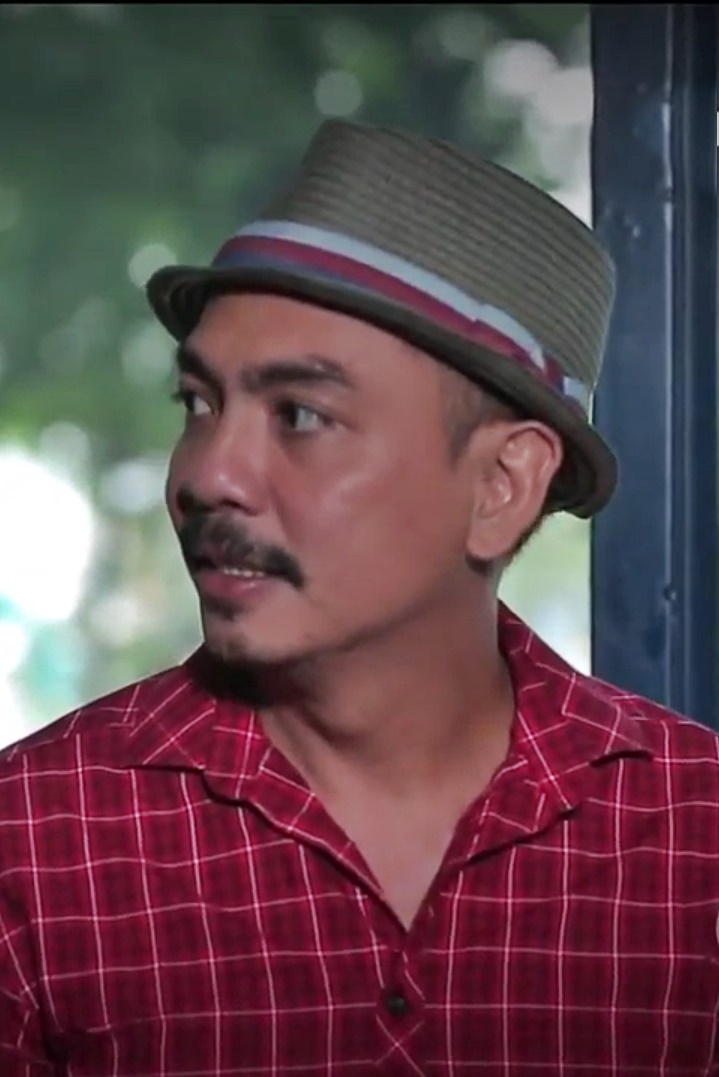
- Born: 9 January 1973 (age 53); Jakarta, Indonesia
- Occupations: Celebrity, comedian
- Years active: 2000–present
- Spouse: Noella Adrianty
- Children: Arkananta Putra Birowo; Mahija Shafiq Birowo
- Parent(s): Wargandi Suryo and Farida Yusuf

Indra Birowo (born 9 January 1973) is an Indonesian actor and comedian, who made his television debut in the comedy show Extravaganza.

Indra is the third child of Wargandi Suryo and Farida Yusuf. He was educated at Canisius College in Jakarta.

He made his film debut in Bintang Jatuh in 2000. He has gone on to appear in numerous Indonesian movies and soap operas.

== Filmography ==
- Marlina the Murderer in Four Acts (2017) as Umbu
- Levitating (2026) as Bayu's father

== Awards and nominations ==
Year	Awards	Category	Recipients	Results
2013	Maya Award	Best Actor in an Omnibus	Rectoverso	Nominated
