= Popmama.com =

Indonesian parenting website

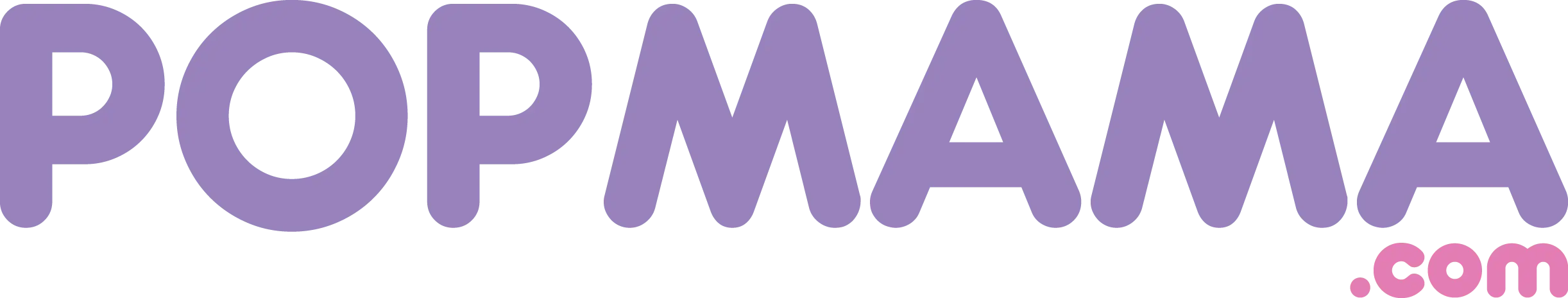
- Company type: Subsidiary
- Industry: Digital media
- Founded: 19 February 2018; 7 years ago
- Founder: Winston Utomo; William Utomo
- Headquarters: Jakarta, Indonesia
- Area served: Indonesia
- Owner: IDN
- Website: www.popmama.com

Popmama.com is digital media multi-platform owned by IDN which deals with topics of childcare for mothers in Indonesia, from pregnancy until the adolescence. Popmama.com has five article categories namely Pregnancy, Baby, Kid, Big Kid, and Life.

== History ==
Popmama.com was launched on 19 February 2018 by Winston Utomo and William Utomo, Indonesian entrepreneurs and owners of IDN.

== Events ==
=== Popmama Parenting Academy ===
Popmama Parenting Academy is an annual event as a forum for young families in Indonesia to learn about childcare.

== Book ==
In 2021, Popmama published an online book Guidance for Pandemic Generation. The content of the book is based on research and experience of members of the WAG Popmama community, while some of the experts involved were psychologist Vera Itabiliana Hadiwidjojo and psychologist Rosdiana Setyaningrum, researcher from University of Indonesia, Ni Luh Putu Maitra Agastya, pediatrician from RSPI Puri Indah, and dr. Cynthia Rindang Kusumaningtyas.

Title	Year	Note
"Guidance for Pandemic Generation"	2021	

== See also ==
- Popbela.com
