= Taiwan Creative Content Fest =

Annual Asian entertainment content market

The Taiwan Creative Content Fest (TCCF) is an annual Asian entertainment content market organized by the Taiwan Creative Content Agency, which launched in 2020. Its programming includes an exhibition, market, a pitch fest and various awards with cash prizes.

The 2025 edition is scheduled to take place November 2–4 at the Taipei Nangang Exhibition Center.

== Festival ==
The fest will feature the Chi-Ling’s Future Makers Award, created by actor Lin Chi-Ling, which will provide TWD500,000 ($16,500) each to three selected works in the feature film, animation, and documentary categories. The award will be used to support original cinematic works centered on women’s issues.

Asian Pacific nonprofit Gold House also sponsored a dedicated award beginning for the 2025 fest. The fest currently maintains a partnership with France’s Centre national du cinéma et de l’image animée and Société Civile des Editeurs de Langue Française.

The market serves as a platform for American and European sponsors, as well as supporting premier Asian content.
