= Didik Nini Thowok =

Javanese dancer (born 1954)

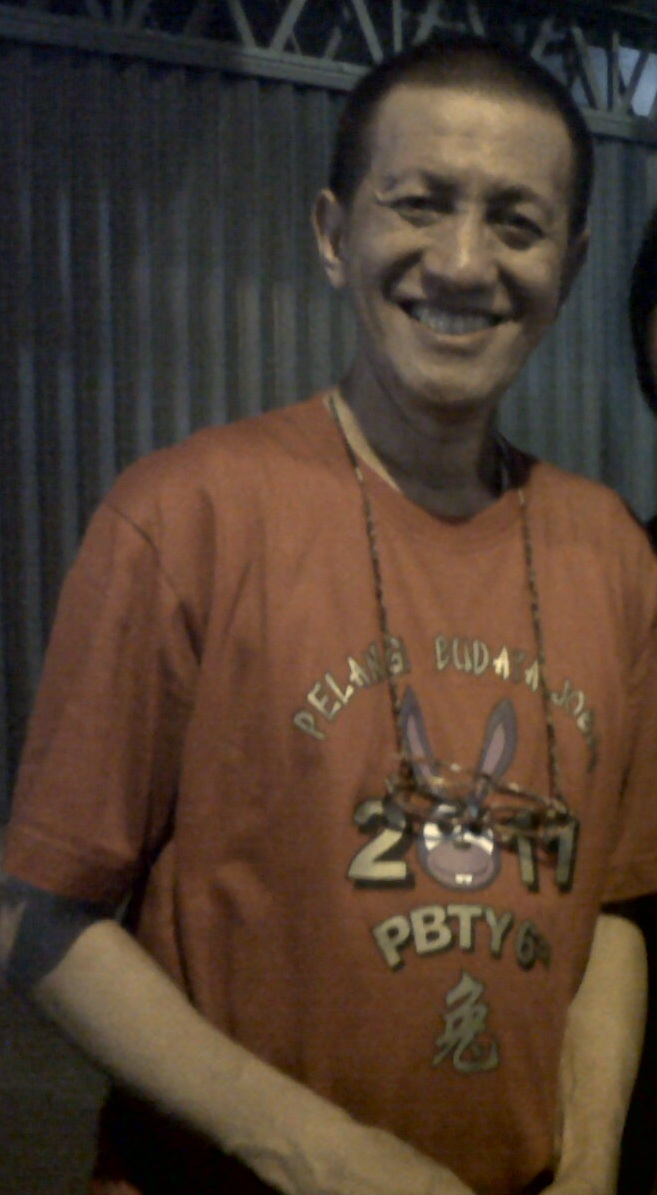
- Born: Kwee Tjoen An; November 13, 1954 (age 70); Temanggung Regency, Central Java, Indonesia
- Other names: Didik Hadiprayitno; Kwee Tjoen Lian; Kwee Cun An
- Occupation(s): Dancer, choreographer, comedian, singer, actor

Chinese name
- Chinese: 郭俊安
Transcriptions
Standard Mandarin
- Hanyu Pinyin: Guō Jùn'ān
Southern Min
- Hokkien POJ: Koeh Chùn An

Didik Hadiprayitno (born 13 November 1954), born Kwee Tjoen An, better known by his stage name Didik Nini Thowok, is an Indonesian dancer who always impersonates women during his performances of traditional Javanese dance and Balinese dance. As he has studied dance in several countries, including Indonesia, India, Japan, and Spain, he often incorporates styles from many cultures in his dances. He is of mixed Chinese-Javanese descent.

== Early life ==
Kwee Tjoen An was born in Temanggung Regency, Central Java, the only son and one of five children of a Chinese Indonesian father in the leather business and a Javanese mother. His Chinese side of family had lived in Java for many generations. His paternal grandfather went to Chinese temples, his paternal grandmother was a Christian, and his mother was originally a Muslim. Kwee Tjoen An was always raised a Christian. While in elementary school, like many other ethnic Chinese who changed their names during the Indonesian mass killings of 1965–66, he changed his name to Didik Hadiprayitno in 1965.

Didik Hadiprayitno began dancing in elementary school. He studied the ketoprak theatre, and his teacher encouraged him to perform female roles. His first public performance was in his village when he was a secondary school student.

== Training ==
Didik Hadiprayitno enrolled in Akademi Seni Tari Indonesia (ASTI, Indonesian Academy of Dance) in 1970. One contemporary dance he performed there was Nini Thowok, based on an old children's game, so he adopted Didik Nini Thowok as his stage name after he graduated in 1974. In 1979, he studied the Cirebon mask dance with Ibu Sudji in Cirebon, West Java. This was the first and the most important training outside of Central Java according to him. Later he studied from many traditional masters in Yogyakarta, Surakarta, Malang, Bali, West Java, and beyond. In Bali, he studied Balinese dance with I. G. A. Ngurah Supartha. He also went to Japan and studied the buyō and noh dance, but he wasn't allowed to study kabuki due to strong inclusion rules. Other dances he learned included the bharatanatyam in India and the flamenco in Spain. What separates him from other dancers is that he studied all dances seriously, by being deferential to his teachers and accepting other cultures wholeheartedly.

== Styles ==
Didik Nini Thowok's most famous dance is the Dwimuka (two face) dance, where he wears one mask worn on the back of his head, and usually another on the front. He dances with his back to the audience, leading them to believe that it was his front. This dance always elicits shock and laughter when the audience discover the truth. In Tari Tengkorak (Skull/skeleton dance), his black costume painted in fluorescent paint appears like a skeleton in ultraviolet light.

== Filmography ==
Year	Title	Role	Notes
2009	Preman in Love		
2009	Jagad X Code		
2016	Wonderful Life		
2025	Perempuan Pembawa Sial		
