= Angga Yunanda =

Indonesian actor (born 2000)

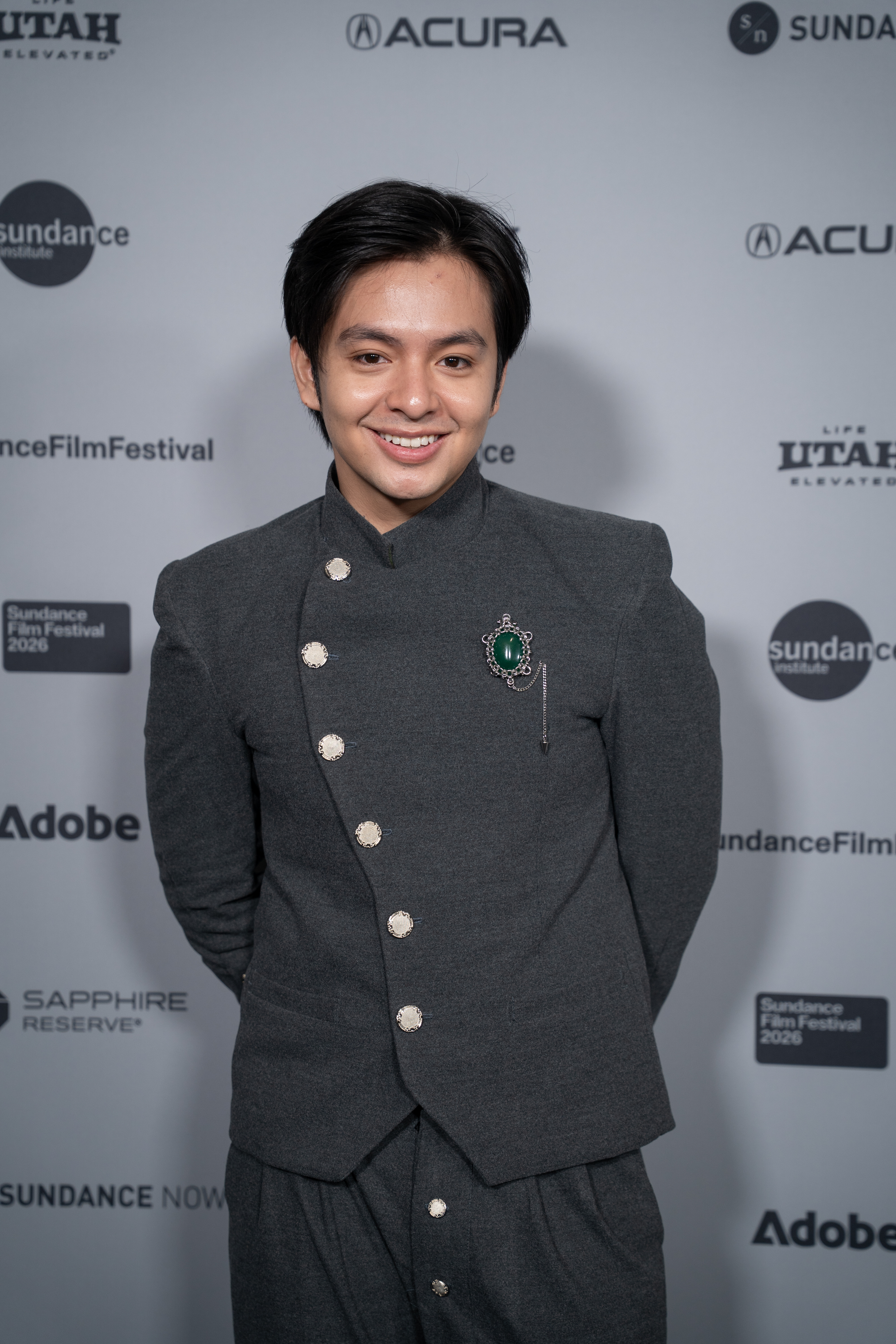
- Angga Yunanda in 2026
- Born: Angga Aldi Yunanda; May 16, 2000 (age 26); Lombok, West Nusa Tenggara, Indonesia
- Occupations: Celebrity; singer
- Years active: 2015–present
- Spouse: Shenina Cinnamon (m. 2025)
- Musical career
- Genres: Pop; R&B
- Instrument: Vocal
- Labels: Glow; MD; Sony Music

Angga Aldi Yunanda (born May 16, 2000) is an Indonesian actor, and singer. He is best known playing in Malu-Malu Kucing and Mermaid in Love.

== Early life ==
Angga Aldi Yunanda was born on May 16, 2000, in Lombok, Indonesia. He is the youngest son of Muhammad Nasir and Yuliati Mahsun, who is a school principal in Lombok, West Nusa Tenggara. He has an older sister, Dinda Yunarmi.

== Career ==
=== Acting career ===
Angga Yunanda started his career as a model. He entered the world of acting in 2015 by starring in his first soap opera, Malu-Malu Kucing playing the role of Baim. Then he played Erick in the soap opera Mermaid in Love and its sequel, Mermaid in Love 2 Dunia.

In 2017, Angga Yunanda portrayed Nathan in the soap opera Nathan & Nadia, co-starring Cassandra Sheryl Lee and Rebecca Klopper. In the same year, he returned to his role in the soap opera Pura-Pura Haji as Nata.

In 2018, Angga Yunanda made his debut in feature films. He starred alongside Amanda Manopo in the horror film entitled Sajen. He played Riza Alif Ramadhan. In November 2018, he returned to his role in the soap opera Dilemma Cinta, playing Luki, co-starring Rebecca Klopper.

In 2019, Angga Yunanda starred in a horror film entitled Tabu: Disturbing the Devil's Gate, playing Diaz, a teenager who likes going on adventures to haunted places, opposite Nadya Fricella. In April 2019, he returned to his role in the romantic drama film Melodylan. In this film he plays Fathur Ardiano. In the same month, he also played Alex in the horror film Sunyi, co-starring Amanda Rawles, based on the 1998 South Korean horror film Whispering Corridors.

Angga Yunanda starred in Gina S. Noer's directorial debut, Two Blue Stripes as Bima, co-starring Adhisty Zara. He was nominated for the Indonesian Film Festival in the category of Best Male Lead, Maya Cup for Selected Lead Actor, Indonesian Movie Actors Awards for Favorite Male Lead and Favorite Couple.

At the end of 2019, Angga Yunanda starred in the biopic film produced by Manoj Punjabi, in Habibie & Ainun 3. In this film, he played Pasha, the grandson of B.J. Habibie. It was released on December 19, 2019.

In 2020, he co-starred Adhisty Zara in the teenage drama film Mariposa, he played Iqbal Guanna Freedy. In the same year, he returned to play in the film Di Bawah Umur. In this film, he plays Aryo with the main opponent Yoriko Angeline. It was released on Disney+ Hotstar on November 13, 2020.

Angga Yunanda was also involved in the production of the film Cinta Pertama, Kedua & Ketiga, alongside Putri Marino.

=== Music career ===
He released his first single entitled "Di Sini untuk Kamu" on March 13, 2017. In the film Sunyi, Angga Yunanda was trusted to sing the theme song entitled "Kejar" which was composed by Ifa Fachir and Mhala Numata. The song was released on March 8, 2019, by MD Music. After joining the MD Music label, Angga Yunanda released his third single entitled "Di Kesepian Ini" on June 19, 2020. The song was created and produced by Hurricane, a former member of Kerispatih. In the song "Di Kesepian Ini", Storm arranged the music using a pop ballad style combined with his deep voice.

In the series Gery's Story, Angga Yunanda was again joined by MD Music to provide the theme song for the series in which he starred. Angga Yunanda and his co-star, Syifa Hadju, performed a song entitled "Cinta Hebat" which was created and produced by Ifa Fachir and Adrian Martadinata. In the work process, the song workshop process was carried out via Zoom in between the production of the Story for Geri series while the vocal recording took place over two days. The song "Cinta Hebat" was released on February 14, 2021.

== Personal life ==
He married Shenina Cinnamon in February 2025.

== Filmography ==
=== Film ===
Acting
Year	Title	Role	Notes
2018	Sajen	Riza Alif Ramadhan	
2019	Tabu: Mengusik Gerbang Iblis	Diaz	
2019	Melodylan	Fathur Ardiano	
2019	Sunyi	Alex	
2019	Two Blue Stripes	Bima	
2019	Habibie & Ainun 3	Muhammad Pasha Nur Fauzan	
2020	Mariposa	Iqbal Guanna Freedy	
2020	Di Bawah Umur	Aryo	
2021	Devil on Top	Anggara Dwi Dharma	
2021	The Watcher	Khrisna	
2021	First, Second & Third Love	Raja	
2022	The Twelve Stories of Glen Anggara	Iqbal Guanna Freedy	
2022	Stealing Raden Saleh	Yusuf Hamdan/Ucup the Hacker	
2023	The End of the Endless	Nico	Short film
2023	Ketika Berhenti di Sini	Yusup	
2023	Catatan Si Boy	Boy Randy Tanoedirja	
2023	Andragogy	Muklas "Animalia" Waseso	
2024	Two Blue Hearts	Bima	
2024	Dinda	Geri Alfian Putra	
2024	Tale of the Land		
2025	Dopamine	Malik	
2026	Levitating	Bayu	
2026	Sebelum Dijemput Nenek	Hestu	
TBA	Malice		Upcoming film

=== Television ===
Acting
Year	Title	Role	Notes
2015	Malu-Malu Kucing	Baim	
2016	Mermaid in Love	Erick	
2016	Lope Mermaid in Love	Erick	Television film
2016–2017	Mermaid in Love 2 Dunia	Erick	
2017	Nathan & Nadia	Nathan	
2017	Pura-Pura Haji	Nata	
2017	Ramadhan I Miss You		Television film
2018	Cegukan Bikin Kasmaran		Television film
2018	Hari Bubur Nasional	Adit	Television film
2018	Dilema Cinta	Luki	Miniseries
2019	Milyader Kece dengan Kearifan Lokal	Farhan	Television film
2019	Digombalin Miss Kecambah, Auto Baper	Joe	Television film
2019	Sambal Cinta Level 29 "Nendang Pedasnya!"	Radin	Television film
2019	Pergi Pagi Pulang Untung Reborn	Adam	Miniseries
2019	Jangan Minta Jatuh Cinta	Ega	Miniseries
2021	Gery's Story	Geri Alfian Putra	Miniseries
2021	Antares	Antares Sebastian Aldevaro	Miniseries
2022	Antares Season 2	Antares Sebastian Aldevaro	Miniseries

=== Music video ===
Year	Title	Performed by	Notes	Ref.
2020	"Awas Jatuh Cinta"	Armada		
2022	"Menghapus Jejakmu"	Noah dan Rejoz TheGROOVE		

== Discography ==
=== Singles ===
As the lead singer
Year	Title	Album	Notes	Ref.
2017	"Di Sini untuk Kamu"	Non-album single		
2019	"Kejar"	Non-album single		
2020	"Di Kesepian Ini"	Non-album single		
2026	"Out" (with Sisca Saras, GLAS & Andrea Tanzil)"	Brownies 2 OST		
2026	"Takkan Terpuaskan"	Brownies 2 OST	Indonesian version "Insatiable" Darren Hayes the year 2001	

Featuring singles
Year	Title	Album	Notes	Ref.
2021	"Cinta Hebat"	Kisah untuk Geri	With Syifa Hadju	
