= Reda Gaudiamo =

Indonesian writer and musician (born 1962)

Reda Gaudiamo (born 1962) is an Indonesian author and musician. Her birthplace was Surabaya in East Java. She formed a duo with Ari Malibu in 1982 called AriReda. At first they played covers of songs by John Denver and Simon and Garfunkel, then they released albums in which they set the poetry of Sapardi Djoko Damono to music. The project ended with the death of Malibu in 2018 . She later told Kompas that the internet had helped their music to spread amongst young people.

Gaudiamo wrote a children's book called The Adventures of Na Willa and promoted it in person at the 2019 London Book Fair after a two-month residency in the city of Norwich which had been funded by the National Book Committee. Consequently, the book was brought out in English translation. She has worked as chief editor of Cosmopolitan Indonesia (founded in 1997), toning down the sexually explicit content of Cosmopolitan to satisfy the local censors. She has also co-produced festivals such as Festival Musikal Indonesia.
