= List of 2024 box office number-one films in Indonesia =

This is a list of films which placed number one at the weekend box office for the year 2024 in Indonesia with the weekly admissions.

== Number-one films ==
†	This implies the highest-grossing movie of the year.

#	Weekend end date	Film	Weekly admissions	Weekend openings in the Top 10	Ref.
1	7 January 2024	Aquaman and the Lost Kingdom	787,274	—N/a	
2	14 January 2024	Ancika	550,177	The Beekeeper (#2); Till Death Do Us Part (#4); The Desperate Hour (#10)	
3	21 January 2024	Ancika	467,912	Rambut Kafan (#4); The Bricklayer (#5); Bu Tejo Sowan Jakarta (#6); Petualangan Anak Penangkap Hantu (#9)	
4	28 January 2024	The Beekeeper	429,094	The Devil's Lair (#2); Setengah Hati (#7); Pulang Tak Harus Rumah (#8); The Reckoning (#9)	
5	4 February 2024	Agak Laen †	1,012,990	The Train of Death (#2); Argylle (#6)	
6	11 February 2024	Agak Laen †	2,688,945	Munkar (#3); Pasutri Gaje (#4); Kupu-Kupu Kertas (#5); Spy × Family Code: White (#6)	
7	18 February 2024	Agak Laen †	2,301,580	Madame Web (#2); Lampir (#5); Ali Topan (#9)	
8	25 February 2024	Agak Laen †	1,350,724	The Corpse Washer (#2); Mystic Singer (#4); Land of Bad (#7); Bob Marley: One Love (#10)	
9	3 March 2024	Agak Laen †	851,559	Exhuma (#3); Devil's Market (#4); Dune: Part Two (#6); Women from Rote Island (#10)	
10	10 March 2024	Exhuma	894,348	Kung Fu Panda 4 (#2); Kuyang (#7); Journey of Love (#8)	
11	17 March 2024	The Corpse Washer	252,000	Devil's Horns (#7)	
12	24 March 2024	Exhuma	920,595	Ghostbusters: Frozen Empire (#5); Kurban: Budak Iblis (#7); Kukejar Mimpi (#10)	
13	31 March 2024	Godzilla x Kong: The New Empire	1,068,443	Dance of Death (#4); The Female Followers of the Devil: Part 2 (#8); Bad Boy in Love (#9)	
14	7 April 2024	Godzilla x Kong: The New Empire	612,114	The First Omen (#2); Keluar Main 1994 (#10)	
15	14 April 2024	Dancing Village: The Curse Begins	1,342,318	Grave Torture (#2)	
16	21 April 2024	Grave Torture	1,897,083	Two Blue Hearts (#4)	
17	28 April 2024	Dancing Village: The Curse Begins	1,070,178	The Fall Guy (#4); Glenn Fredly: The Movie (#6); The Roundup: Punishment (#9)	
18	5 May 2024	Menjelang Ajal	475,471	The Architecture of Love (#2); Civil War (#4); Abigail (#10)	
19	12 May 2024	Vina: Before 7 Days	2,121,373	Kingdom of the Planet of the Apes (#2)	
20	19 May 2024	Vina: Before 7 Days	2,471,078	How to Make Millions Before Grandma Dies (#3); Do You See What I See? (#5); Tarot (#7); Cash Out (#10)	
21	26 May 2024	How to Make Millions Before Grandma Dies	1,543,866	Harlot's Prayer (#2); Furiosa: A Mad Max Saga (#5); Respati (#6); The Ministry of Ungentlemanly Warfare (#8)	
22	2 June 2024	How to Make Millions Before Grandma Dies	974,285	Haikyu!! The Dumpster Battle (#3); The Garfield Movie (#4); Temurun (#6)	
23	9 June 2024	Bad Boys: Ride or Die	349,863	Paku Tanah Jawa (#5)	
24	16 June 2024	Ipar Adalah Maut	749,889	Inside Out 2 (#2); Dilan Wo Ai Ni (#10)	
25	23 June 2024	Ipar Adalah Maut	1,575,891	Sengkolo: Malam Satu Suro (#5); The Strangers: Chapter 1 (#8); Chief of Station (#9)	
26	30 June 2024	Ipar Adalah Maut	1,191,579	A Quiet Place: Day One (#2); Si Juki the Movie: Harta Pulau Monyet (#5); Marni: The Story of Wewe Gombel (#6)	
27	7 July 2024	Despicable Me 4	794,390	Sekawan Limo (#3)	
28	14 July 2024	Sekawan Limo	1,004,224	Jurnal Risa by Risa Saraswati (#3); Twisters (#5); The Exorcism (#8); Harta Tahta Boru Ni Raja (#10)	
29	21 July 2024	Sekawan Limo	531,811	Catatan Harian Menantu Sinting (#2); Longlegs (#5); Pusaka (#6); Hijack 1971 (#10)	
30	28 July 2024	Deadpool & Wolverine	1,378,129	Bangsal Isolasi (#5)	
31	4 August 2024	Deadpool & Wolverine	1,002,198	A Legend (#2); Sakaratul Maut (#3); Heartbreak Motel (#6); All Access to Rossa 25 Shining Years (#8); Blackpink World Tour [Born Pink] in Cinemas (#10)	
32	11 August 2024	Deadpool & Wolverine	597,210	Rumah Dinas Bapak (#2); Uang Panai 2 (#4); Trap (#6); Detective Conan: The Million-dollar Pentagram (#8); Borderlands (#10)	
33	18 August 2024	Kang Mak from Pee Mak	1,236,673	Dosen Ghaib: Sudah Malam atau Sudah Tahu (#2); Alien: Romulus (#3); It Ends with Us (#9)	
34	25 August 2024	Kang Mak from Pee Mak	1,705,784	Kromoleo (#3); Azzamine (#6); The Crow (#8); Janda (#9); Seventeen Tour 'Follow' Again to Cinemas (#10)	
35	1 September 2024	Kang Mak from Pee Mak	980,618	Thaghut (#2); Kaka Boss (#3); Arcadian (#6); Hounds of War (#8); Revolver (#9)	
36	8 September 2024	Kang Mak from Pee Mak	531,155	Seni Memahami Kekasih (#4); Perjanjian Setan (#5); Beetlejuice Beetlejuice (#6); Subservience (#7)	
37	15 September 2024	Laura	541,388	Transformers One (#3); Malam Keramat (#7); Speak No Evil (#8)	
38	22 September 2024	Lembayung	500,526	Hellboy: The Crooked Man (#7)	
39	29 September 2024	Lembayung	626,685	Sumala (#2); Home Sweet Loan (#3); I, the Executioner (#9); Tulang Belulang Tulang (#10)	
40	6 October 2024	Home Sweet Loan	703,241	Dominion of Darkness (#3); Joker: Folie à Deux (#5); Panda Plan (#6); Laut Tengah (#7); Kutukan Calon Arang (#9)	
41	13 October 2024	Dominion of Darkness	585,526	Kemah Terlarang: Kesurupan Massal (#3); Pulau Hantu (#6); The Wild Robot (#8); Canary Black (#9)	
42	20 October 2024	Bolehkah Sekali Saja Kumenangis	423,549	Redemption of Sin (#6); Weekend in Taipei (#7); Smile 2 (#10)	
43	27 October 2024	Venom: The Last Dance	805,647	Perewangan (#3); My Annoying Brother (#5); Sang Pengadil (#9)	
44	3 November 2024	Venom: The Last Dance	687,320	Dosa Musyrik (#5); You Will Die in 6 Hours (#8); Absolution (#9)	
45	10 November 2024	Santet Segoro Pitu	446,210	Red One (#3); Anak Kolong (#7); Danyang: Mahar Tukar Nyawa (#8)	
46	17 November 2024	Bila Esok Ibu Tiada	1,206,689	Gladiator II (#3); Wanita Ahli Neraka (#6)	
47	24 November 2024	Bila Esok Ibu Tiada	1,229,420	Wicked (#2); Petak Umpet (#4); Hidup Ini Terlalu Banyak Kamu (#7); Pantaskah Aku Berhijab (#9); We Live in Time (#10)	
48	1 December 2024	Moana 2	1,145,173	Cinta Dalam Ikhlas (#5); Guna Guna Istri Muda (#6); Negeri Para Ketua (#9); Death Whisperer 2 (#10)	
49	8 December 2024	Moana 2	938,062	Werewolves (#4); Konco-Konco Edan (#7); Devils Stay (#9); Love Unlike in K-Dramas (#10)	
50	15 December 2024	Moana 2	508,202	Hutang Nyawa (#2); Kraven the Hunter (#3); Racun Sangga (#4); NCT DREAM Mystery Lab: DREAM( )SCAPE in Cinemas (#10)	
51	22 December 2024	Mufasa: The Lion King	543,510	Modal Nekad (#2); Sorop (#6); Sonic the Hedgehog 3 (#10)	
52	29 December 2024	Mufasa: The Lion King	705,346	2nd Miracle in Cell No.7 (#2); The Haunted Apartment (#4)	

== Highest-grossing films ==
International film Indonesian film

Highest-grossing films of 2024 (In year release)
Rank	Title	Total admissions
1	Agak Laen	9,125,188
2	Vina: Before 7 Days	5,815,912
3	Kang Mak from Pee Mak	4,860,565
4	Ipar Adalah Maut	4,776,565
5	Dancing Village: The Curse Begins	4,015,120
6	Grave Torture	4,000,826
7	Bila Esok Ibu Tiada	3,919,949
8	How to Make Millions Before Grandma Dies	3,548,660
9	Godzilla x Kong: The New Empire	3,288,884
10	Deadpool & Wolverine	3,139,365

== Milestones ==
=== Films exceeding one million admissions ===
International film Indonesian film

No.	Film	Date	Days	Total admissions	Ref.
1	Ancika	22 January 2024	12	1,318,885	
2	Agak Laen	4 February 2024	4	9,127,602	
3	The Train of Death	25 February 2024	25	1,000,027	
4	The Corpse Washer	3 March 2024	11	1,645,513	
5	Exhuma	10 March 2024	12	2,600,105	
6	Kung Fu Panda 4	22 March 2024	17	1,517,591	
7	Godzilla x Kong: The New Empire	31 March 2024	4	3,288,884	
8	Dancing Village: The Curse Begins	13 April 2024	3	4,015,120	
9	Grave Torture	14 April 2024	4	4,000,826	
10	Vina: Before 7 Days	10 May 2024	3	5,815,945	
11	How to Make Millions Before Grandma Dies	23 May 2024	9	3,548,660	
12	The Architecture of Love	2 June 2024	33	1,003,999	
13	Kingdom of the Planet of the Apes	2 June 2024	26	1,007,315	
14	Ipar Adalah Maut	17 June 2024	5	4,776,565	
15	Inside Out 2	22 June 2024	11	2,018,550	
16	A Quiet Place: Day One	10 July 2024	15	1,107,144	
17	Despicable Me 4	9 July 2024	7	1,693,471	
18	Sekawan Limo	10 July 2024	7	2,512,129	
19	Deadpool & Wolverine	27 July 2024	4	3,288,884	
20	Kang Mak from Pee Mak	18 August 2024	4	4,860,565	
21	Laura	22 September 2024	11	1,246,678	
22	Lembayung	28 September 2024	9	1,656,149	
23	Home Sweet Loan	6 October 2024	11	1,720,271	
24	Sumala	6 October 2024	11	1,436,640	
25	Dominion of Darkness	13 October 2024	11	1,466,466	
26	Venom: The Last Dance	29 October 2024	7	1,974,672	
27	Bolehkah Sekali Saja Kumenangis	3 November 2024	18	1,150,952	
28	Bila Esok Ibu Tiada	17 November 2024	4	3,919,949	
29	Santet Segoro Pitu	18 November 2024	12	1,300,007	
30	Moana 2	1 December 2024	5	3,133,663	
31	Mufasa: The Lion King	26 December 2024	9	1,872,836	
32	2nd Miracle in Cell No. 7	1 January 2025	7	1,905,977	

=== Films exceeding two millions admissions ===
No.	Film	Date	Days	Ref.
1	Agak Laen	7 February 2024	7	
2	Exhuma	21 March 2024	23	
3	Godzilla x Kong: The New Empire	14 April 2024	18	
4	Dancing Village: The Curse Begins	16 April 2024	6	
5	Grave Torture	17 April 2024	7	
6	Vina: Before 7 Days	12 May 2024	5	
7	How to Make Millions Before Grandma Dies	27 May 2024	13	
8	Ipar Adalah Maut	21 June 2024	9	
9	Inside Out 2	8 July 2024	27	
10	Sekawan Limo	20 July 2024	17	
11	Deadpool & Wolverine	2 August 2024	10	
12	Kang Mak from Pee Mak	22 August 2024	8	
13	Bila Esok Ibu Tiada	22 November 2024	9	
14	Moana 2	8 December 2024	12	

=== Films exceeding three millions admissions ===
No.	Film	Date	Days	Ref.
1	Agak Laen	9 February 2024	9	
2	Godzilla x Kong: The New Empire	17 April 2024	21	
3	Grave Torture	21 April 2024	11	
4	Dancing Village: The Curse Begins	22 April 2024	12	
5	Vina: Before 7 Days	14 May 2024	7	
6	How to Make Millions Before Grandma Dies	5 June 2024	22	
7	Ipar Adalah Maut	27 June 2024	14	
8	Deadpool & Wolverine	12 August 2024	20	
9	Kang Mak from Pee Mak	26 August 2024	13	
10	Bila Esok Ibu Tiada	29 November 2024	16	
11	Moana 2	29 December 2024	33	

=== Films exceeding four millions admissions ===
No.	Film	Date	Days	Ref.
1	Agak Laen	12 February 2024	12	
2	Vina: Before 7 Days	16 May 2024	11	
3	Grave Torture	20 May 2024	40	
4	Dancing Village: The Curse Begins	28 May 2024	48	
5	Ipar Adalah Maut	3 July 2024	20	
6	Kang Mak from Pee Mak	2 September 2024	19	

=== Films exceeding five millions admissions ===
No.	Film	Date	Days	Ref.
1	Agak Laen	16 February 2024	16	
2	Vina: Before 7 Days	24 May 2024	19	

=== Films exceeding six millions admissions ===
No.	Film	Date	Days	Ref.
1	Agak Laen	18 February 2024	18	

=== Films exceeding seven millions admissions ===
No.	Film	Date	Days	Ref.
1	Agak Laen	24 February 2024	24	

=== Films exceeding eight millions admissions ===
No.	Film	Date	Days	Ref.
1	Agak Laen	2 March 2024	31	

=== Films exceeding nine millions admissions ===
No.	Film	Date	Days	Ref.
1	Agak Laen	25 March 2024	53	

== See also ==
- List of highest-grossing films in Indonesia

Preceded by 2023	2024	Succeeded by 2025
