= 20th Jogja-NETPAC Asian Film Festival =

2025 film festival

- Opening film: Opera Jawa by Garin Nugroho
- Closing film: Comedy Buddy by Aco Tenriyagelli
- Location: Yogyakarta, Indonesia
- Festival date: 29 November–6 December 2025
- Website: jaff-filmfest.org

Jogja-NETPAC Asian Film Festival
- 21st 19th

The 20th annual Jogja-NETPAC Asian Film Festival took place from 29 November to 6 December 2025 in Yogyakarta, Indonesia. It opened with the 35 mm screening of Garin Nugroho's 2006 film Opera Jawa and closed with Aco Tenriyagelli's directorial debut Comedy Buddy. A total of 227 films from 43 Asia-Pacific countries were screened during the festival.

A special program, Reza Rahadian: 20 Years Reflection, commemorating the Indonesian actor's twenty years of career, took place during the festival. An exclusive ten-minute preview of Kamila Andini's Four Seasons in Java was screened at the festival.

The most prestigious award of the festival, Golden Hanoman Award, was awarded to Cambodian supernatural drama film Becoming Human by Polen Ly.

== Juries ==
The following juries were named for the festival.

=== Hanoman Award ===
- Eric Khoo, Singaporean filmmaker
- Suryana Paramita, Indonesian film producer
- Tumpal Tampubolon, Indonesian filmmaker

=== NETPAC Award ===
- Bunga Siagian, Indonesian artist and researcher
- Herman Van Eyken, lecturer
- Marissa Anita, Indonesian actress

=== Blencong Award ===
- Henry Foundation, Indonesian musician and visual artist
- Khozy Rizal, Indonesian filmmaker
- Mary Pansanga, Thai curator and artist

=== Indonesian Screen Award ===
- Amir Muhammad, Malaysian writer and filmmaker
- Antoinette Jadaone, Filipino director
- Puiyee Leong, Singaporean arts manager and film programmer

=== Geber Award ===
- Dennis Adhiswara, Indonesian actor
- Iam Murda, Indonesian filmmaker
- Siska Raharja, Indonesian film producer

=== Student Award ===
- Andrienne Adelia
- Dimas Putro Utomo
- Fada Ramadhan Dhiya
- Janssen Ewaldo
- Ramadhani Meautia Iffa

== Official selection ==
=== Opening and closing films ===
English title	Original title	Director(s)	Production countrie(s)
Opera Jawa (2006) (opening film)		Garin Nugroho	Indonesia
Comedy Buddy (closing film)	Suka Duka Tawa	Aco Tenriyagelli	Indonesia

=== In competition ===
English title	Original title	Director(s)	Production countrie(s)
A Useful Ghost	ผีใช้ได้ค่ะ	Ratchapoom Boonbunchachoke	Thailand, France, Singapore, Germany
Amoeba		Siyou Tan	Singapore, Netherlands, France, Spain, South Korea
Becoming Human	ជាតិជាមនុស្សា	Polen Ly	Cambodia
Flames	Laptein	Ravi Shankar Kaushik	India
Girl	女孩	Shu Qi	Taiwan
Hair, Paper, Water...	Tóc, Giấy và Nước...	Trương Minh Quý, Nicolas Graux	Vietnam, Belgium, France
Lost Land	Harà Watan	Akio Fujimoto	Japan, France, Malaysia, Germany
On Your Lap	Pangku	Reza Rahadian	Indonesia, Saudi Arabia
Summer's Camera	Yeoreumeui Camera	Divine Sung	South Korea
Sunshine		Antoinette Jadaone	Philippines
The World of Love	세계의 주인	Yoon Ga-eun	South Korea

=== Light of Asia ===
English title	Original title	Director(s)	Production countrie(s)
A Better Place	Du Học Sinh	Ben Oui	Taiwan, Malaysia
After Colossus		Timoteus Anggawan Kusno	Indonesia, Netherlands, Italy
Anatomy of a Call	通訊默示錄	Arnold Tam	Hong Kong
Au Revoir Siam		Domenico Singha Pedroli	France, Switzerland, Thailand
Baozhda	Bao Zi Da	Keran Abukasimu	China
Children's Day		Giselle Lin	Singapore
The Fishbowl Girl	金魚缸小姐	Hung Yi Wu	Taiwan
Honey, My Love, So Sweet		JT Trinidad	Philippines
Hyena		Altay Ulan Yang	China, United States
My Name Is Hope		Sherwan Haji	Finland
Omen	Điềm Báo	Hồ Thanh Thảo	Vietnam
This Is Budi's Mother	Ini Ibu Budi	Abimana Aryasatya	Indonesia
Throughout These Cages	Sekat Sekat	Aaron Pratama	Indonesia
Vox Humana		Don Josephus Raphael Eblahan	Philippines, United States, Singapore
Water Sports		Whammy Alcazaren	Philippines
What Have You Done, Zarina?	Zarina, Sen Ne Istep Qoidyñ?	Camila Sagyntkan	Kazakhstan
Won't Be Here	Wo Bu Zai De Ming Tian	Tan Jiali, Zhu Haoyuan	China

=== Panorama ===
English title	Original title	Director(s)	Production countrie(s)
All That's Left of You	اللي باقي منك	Cherien Dabis	Germany, Cyprus, Palestine, Jordan, Greece, Qatar, Saudi Arabia
Human Resource		Nawapol Thamrongrattanarit	Thailand
It Was Just an Accident		Jafar Panahi	Iran, France, Luxembourg, United States
Kokuho		Lee Sang-il	Japan
Magellan		Lav Diaz	Philippines, Spain, Portugal, France, Taiwan
The President's Cake	مملكة القصب	Hasan Hadi	Iraq, United States, Qatar
Put Your Soul on Your Hand and Walk		Sepideh Farsi	France, Palestine, Iran
Renoir		Chie Hayakawa	Japan
Resurrection		Bi Gan	China
Scarlet	果てしなきスカーレット	Mamoru Hosoda	Japan
Two Seasons, Two Strangers	旅と日々	Sho Miyake	Japan
Unidentified		Haifaa al-Mansour	Saudi Arabia
The Voice of Hind Rajab		Kaouther Ben Hania	Tunisia, France, United States

=== Asian Perspectives ===
English title	Original title	Director(s)	Production countrie(s)
A Story About Fire	Ran Bi Wa	Li Wenyu	China
The Academy of Fine Arts		Jayabrata Das	India
Bury Us in a Lone Desert	Nấm Mồ Lý Tưởng	Nguyễn Lê Hoàng Phúc	Vietnam
Diamonds in the Sand		Janus Victoria	Japan, Malaysia, Philippines
The Fox King		Woo Ming Jin	Malaysia, Indonesia
Hani	哈尼	Dasheng Hou	Japan
Happy Life	嬉々な生活	Yoshihiko Taniguchi	Japan
Humans in the Loop		Aranya Sahay	India
I Fell in Love with a Z-Grade Director in Brooklyn	ブルックリンでZ級監督と恋に落ちた私	Kenichi Ugana	United States
I, the Song	མོ་གི་གསང་བའི་ཞབས་ཁྲ	Dechen Roder	Bhutan, France, Norway, Italy
Ky Nam Inn	Quán Kỳ Nam	Leon Le	Vietnam
The Last Summer	Xia Zhui	Shi Renfei	China
Like a Rolling Stone		Lichuan Yin	China
Love Chaos Kin		Chithra Jeyaram	United States
Mr. Kim Goes to the Cinema		Kim Dong-ho	South Korea
Numakage Public Pool	沼影市民プール	Shingo Ota	Japan
The Old Man and His Car	老破车	Michael Kam	Singapore
Queer As Punk		Yihwen Chen	Malaysia, Indonesia
Sand City	Balur Nogorite	Mahde Hasan	Bangladesh
Taroman Expo Explosion	大長編 タローマン 万博大爆発	Ryo Fujii	Japan
We Are Inside	Nahnou Fil Dakhel	Farah Kassem	Lebanon, Qatar, Denmark
White Snow		Praveen Morchhale	India
Shorts
A Better Place	베터 플레이스	Ali Sohail Jaura	South Korea
A Very Straight Neck		Neo Sora	China, Japan
After the Cat	Mao Yu Ji	Chu Hoi Ying	Taiwan
Agapito		Arvin Belarmino, Kyla Danelle	Philippines, France
Before the Sea Forgets		Ngọc Duy Lê	Singapore
Creature Feature		Martika Ramirez Escobar	Philippines
Don Quixote		Rahil Fallahfar	Iran
EXIT		Lee Yong Chao	Myanmar
The Good Student	모범상	Park Ho-beom	South Korea
Grandma Nai Who Played Favorites	Chao Somnop Chet	Chheangkea	Cambodia, France, United States
Heading West	10.000 năm đi về phía Tây	Sulla (Ngan Nguyen)	Vietnam
the last swimming reunion before life happens	yung huling swimming reunion before life happens	Glenn Barit	Philippines
Mirage: Eigenstate		Riar Rizaldi	Indonesia, United Kingdom, Portugal
Moti		Yash Saraf	India
My Plastic Mother	Anak Macan	Amar Haikal	Indonesia
Negana		Vania Qanita Damayanti	Indonesia
NO!!!	NGGAK!!!	Oktania Hamdani, Winner Wijaya	Indonesia
Once Upon a Time There Was a Mountain	從前有座山	To Chun Him	Hong Kong
Orlo with Karma	Tian Cha Guan Nv Hai	Kangdrun	China
The Park Is Public	Shi Gong Yuan	Li Yan	China
The Prediction	Kanippu	Rishi Chandna	India
Sammi, Who Can Detach His Body Parts		Rein Maychaelson	Indonesia
Shackles of Sky	Hinde Gaali Munde Matthe	Ragu Aarav	India
Sound Guardians		Leah Varjacques	Indonesia, United States
When the Fan Stops	합진산업	Hyein Lim	South Korea
Wind	Bād	Moeinoddin Jalali	Iran
Yellow MashiMashi Rhapsody (Beta)	イエロー・マシマシ・ラプソディ（仮）	Masahiro Saito	Japan

=== Rewind ===
English title	Original title	Director(s)	Production countrie(s)
Battle Royale (2000)	バトル・ロワイアル	Kinji Fukasaku	Japan
Girls' Dormitory (1958)	Asrama Dara	Usmar Ismail	Indonesia
Hari untuk Amanda (2010)		Angga Dwimas Sasongko	Indonesia
Joni's Promise (2005)	Janji Joni	Joko Anwar	Indonesia
Linda Linda Linda (2005)	リンダ リンダ リンダ	Nobuhiro Yamashita	Japan
Madame X (2010)		Lucky Kuswandi	Indonesia
Yi Yi (2000)		Edward Yang	Taiwan, Japan

=== Nocturnal ===
English title	Original title	Director(s)	Production countrie(s)
Kinki	近畿地方のある場所について	Kōji Shiraishi	Japan
Lesbian Space Princess		Emma Hough Hobbs, Leela Varghese	Australia
The Weed Eaters		Callum Devlin	New Zealand
Shorts
DHET!	ধ্যাৎ!	Ummid Ashraf	Bangladesh
Echoes of the Night		Tamara Sangdow	Thailand, United States
How An Apocalypse Ends	Cách một đại dịch kết thúc	Thuy Trang Dang	Vietnam
Karim		Jusuf Witjaksono	Indonesia
Lingering Memories	ระหว่างทาง..กลับบ้าน	Nareupol Srimueng	Thailand
MAAGHLUG		Nabila Larasati	Indonesia
Over the Green Hills	Bên kia đồi xanh thẳm	Vu Nguyen Nam Khue	Vietnam
The Peel	褪皮 以及露出來的	NanTung Lin	Taiwan, Portugal, Belgium, Finland
Repulsion	斥子	Chen Yan-hong	Taiwan
Rotten Pleasure	Bangkai Nafsu	Woyzeck	Indonesia
Taxi Driver Who Caught the Murderer	살인범 잡은 택시기사	Kim Soyeon	South Korea
T e k a t é		Fransiskus Antonius Mahendra	Indonesia
Uniform	유니폼	Dayeon Kang	South Korea
When the Cold Wind Blows		Jon Keng	Malaysia, Singapore

=== Indonesian Screen Awards ===
English title	Original title	Director(s)	Production countrie(s)
A Thousand Shades of Purnama	Seribu Bayang Purnama	Yahdi Jamhur	Indonesia
Agak Laen: Menyala Pantiku!		Muhadkly Acho	Indonesia
Better Off Dead	Tinggal Meninggal	Kristo Immanuel	Indonesia
Dancing with the Body	Lenggak-Lenggok	Andi Imam Prakasa	Indonesia
Dopamine	Dopamin	Teddy Soeria Atmadja	Indonesia
Ikatan Darah		Sidharta Tata	Indonesia
Mothernet	Esok Tanpa Ibu	Ho Wi-ding	Indonesia, Singapore
The Period of Her		Erlina Rakhmawati, Praditha Blifa, Sarah Adilah, Yulinda Dwi Andriyani	Indonesia
Rangga & Cinta		Riri Riza	Indonesia
Smothered	Legenda Kelam Malin Kundang	Kevin Rahardjo, Rafki Hidayat	Indonesia
Sore: Wife from the Future	Sore: Istri dari Masa Depan	Yandy Laurens	Indonesia
The Tiger	Pamacan	Ardiansah Sulistiana	Indonesia
Worn Out	Judheg	Misya Latief	Indonesia

=== Indonesian Film Showcase ===
English title	Original title	Director(s)	Production countrie(s)
A DISTORTED INDIVIDUAL.		Adythia Utama	Indonesia, Italy
Andaikan Kau Datang Kembali		Dyan Sunu Prastowo	Indonesia
Gestures of Care		Aryo Danusiri	Indonesia, Australia
The Last Accord: War, Apocalypse, and Peace in Aceh		Arfan Sabran	Indonesia, Finland
The Last Supper	Perjamuan Terakhir	Daniel Rudi Haryanto	Indonesia
Lavender Marriage		Razka Robby Ertanto	Indonesia
Lost in the Spotlight	Lupa Daratan	Ernest Prakasa	Indonesia
Mimpi Keluarga Sempurna		Bagas Satrio	Indonesia
Siapa Dia		Garin Nugroho	Indonesia

== Awards ==
The following awards were presented at the festival:

- Golden Hanoman Award: Becoming Human by Polen Ly
- Silver Hanoman Award: A Useful Ghost by Ratchapoom Boonbunchachoke
  - Jury Special Mention: Sunshine by Antoinette Jadaone
- Blencong Award: Water Sports by Whammy Alcazaren
  - Jury Special Mention: Hyena by Altay Ulan Yang
- JAFF Indonesian Screen Awards
  - Best Film: Better Off Dead by Kristo Immanuel
  - Best Directing: Kristo Immanuel for Better Off Dead
  - Best Performance: Afiqa Kirana for The Period of Her and Omara Esteghlal for Better Off Dead
  - Best Cinematography: Vera Lestafa for Dopamine
  - Best Editing: Ryan Purwoko for Better Off Dead
  - Best Screenplay: Kristo Immanuel and Jessica Tjiu for Better Off Dead
  - Best Music: Anto Hoed and Melly Goeslaw for Rangga & Cinta
  - Best Sound Design: Pramudya Adhy Wardhana, Ridho Fachri, Renaldy Lomo, Alexandrie Dolly, Luthfi AG, Iqbal "Encik" Marekan, Halid Ilham, and Ikhsan Nugroho for The Period of Her
  - Best Production Design: Ahmad Zulkarnaen and Wahyu Efata for Ikatan Darah
  - Best Poster: Evan Wijaya and Jozz Felix for Sore: Wife from the Future
- NETPAC Award: Becoming Human by Polen Ly
- Geber Award: Sunshine by Antoinette Jadaone
- Students Award: Water Sports by Whammy Alcazaren
