= Pelangi di Mars =

- Theatrical poster
- Directed by: Upie Guava
- Written by: Alim Sudio; Upie Guava
- Produced by: Dendi Reynando
- Starring: Messi Gusti; Lutesha; Rio Dewanto; Livy Renata; Myesha Lin
- Production companies: Mahakarya Pictures; MBK Productions; Produksi Film Negara; RANS Entertainment; Guava Film; DossGuavaXR Studio; A&Z Films
- Release date: March 18, 2026 (Indonesia)
- Running time: 112 minutes
- Country: Indonesia
- Language: Indonesian

Pelangi di Mars, also known as Rainbow on Mars, is an Indonesian family science fiction film directed by Upie Guava and produced by Dendi Reynando and Mahakarya Pictures.

== Synopsis ==
In the year 2090, conditions on Earth have become uninhabitable due to a clean water crisis monopolized by a corporation named Nerotex. This situation forces humanity to establish colonies on Mars.

The story focuses on Pelangi a 12-year-old girl with the unique status of being the first human born and raised on Mars. After her mother, Pratiwi, and the rest of the human colony abandon the planet, Pelangi lives among a group of derelict robots. Together with these robots, Pelangi embarks on an adventure to find a rare mineral called Zeolith Omega, which is believed to be capable of purifying water on Earth.

== Cast ==
=== Human characters ===
- Messi Gusti as Pelangi
- Lutesha as Pratiwi
- Rio Dewanto as Banyu
- Livy Renata as Mirna
- Myesha Lin as young Pelangi

=== Robot characters ===
- Bimo Kusumo as Batik
- Dimitri Arditya as Sulil
- Vanya Rivani as Kimchi
- Kristo Immanuel as Yoman
- Gilang Dirga as Petya

== See also ==
- Jumbo
- Pratiwi Sudarmono
