= Imajinari =

Indonesian film production company

Akal Andal Aksara
- Trade name: IMAJINARI
- Industry: Film
- Founder: Ernest Prakasa; Dipa Andika
- Headquarters: Indonesia
- Area served: Indonesia
- Key people: Ernest Prakasa
- Products: Film; Web series
- Owner: Hahaha Corp

YouTube information
- Channel: @Imajinari
- Years active: 2022–present

PT Akal Andal Aksara or trade as Imajinari (stylised in all caps as IMAJINARI) is a movie production company founded by comedian and director Ernest Prakasa and his manager Dipa Andika, as part of PT Tawa Tiada Tara or Hahaha Corp, a comedy talent management company.

Imajinari is known for producing films based on strong original stories. Their first feature film, Missing Home, which featured the local culture of a Batak family, reached 2.8 million viewers and topped the local box office in 2022.

Imajinari's second film was a black-and-white romantic-drama, Falling In Love Like In Movies, starring Ringgo Agus Rahman and Nirina Zubir. Although in terms of audience numbers it was not as successful as their first production, Letterboxd included this film in the Most Heart to Views and 10 Best Romantic Movies of 2023.

Imajinari collaborated with a comedy podcast, Agak Laen, to develop their IP as a comedy movie with the same title, which became the best-selling Indonesian comedy movie of all time, with 9,125,188 viewers.

At the 2024 Indonesian Film Festival, Falling in Love Like in the Movies won seven awards the most of any film at the festival, while Agak Laen received the Antemas Award for the highest-grossing film of 2024. This established Imajinari as a production company that produces works that are successful both commercially and at film festivals.

The film Agak Laen: Menyala Pantiku! became the highest-grossing Indonesian film of all time, with a final tally of 11,000,866 viewers. These numbers grew rapidly: 272,846 viewers on opening day, 1,000,000 viewers in 3 days, over 3,000,000 viewers in one week, 5,000,000 viewers in 11 days, and then surpassing the film Agak Laen (9,125,188 viewers) within 28 days of release. On January 2, 2026, the film became the highest-grossing Indonesian film of all time with over 10,250,000 viewers, surpassing the film Jumbo. Ultimately, Agak Laen: Menyala Pantiku! became the highest-grossing film of all time in Indonesia, surpassing the record previously held by Avengers: Endgame with a total of 10,980,933 viewers.

== Production ==
=== Film ===
Release	Title	Directors	Co-production Patners	Genre	Ref.
As Main Studios
2022	Missing Home; ID: Ngeri Ngeri Sedap	Bene Dion Rajagukguk	Visionari Film Fund	Comedy Drama	
2023	Falling In Love Like In Movies	Yandy Laurens	Jagartha, Trinity Entertainment, Cerita Films	Romance	
2024	Agak Laen	Muhadkly Acho	Jagartha, Trinity Entertainment, A&Z Films, Legacy Pictures, Agak Laen	Comedy Horror	
2024	Harta Tahta Raisa	Soleh Solihun	Juni Records, Jagartha, Trinity Entertainment	Documenter	
2024	Kaka Boss	Arie Kriting	Jagartha, Trinity Entertainment, A&Z Films, Karma Club, Legacy Pictures	Drama Comedy	
2024	Love Unlike in K-Dramas	Meira Anastasia	Jagartha, Trinity Entertainment, Legacy Pictures, A&Z Films, Navarros, Rhaya Flicks	Romance	
2025	Agak Laen: Menyala Pantiku!	Muhadkly Acho	Jagartha, Trinity Entertainment, Legacy Pictures, A&Z Films, Navarros, Agak Laen	Comedy Crime	
2025	Better Off Dead; ID: Tinggal Meninggal	[Kristo Immanuel]	Jagartha, Trinity Entertainment	Dark Comedy	
2025	Lost in the Spotlight; ID: Lupa Daratan	Ernest Prakasa	Netflix Original Indonesia	Comedy	
2026	Operasi Pesta Copet ^{a}	Edy Khemod	Angin Segar, Boss Creator, Jagartha, Trinity Entertainment, Legacy Pictures, Navarros	Heist Comedy	
TBA	Pulang Kampung	Bene Dion Rajagukguk	—	Musical	
TBA	Bandits of Batavia	Ernest Prakasa	Beyondtopia	Action	
As Co-production Studios
2025	Sore: Wife from the Future	Yandy Laurens	Cerita Films, Slingshot Pictures, Miles Films, Studio Artemis, Jagartha, Trinity Entertainment, Dwidaya Amadeo Gemintang	Romance Fantasy	
2025	Rangga & Cinta	Riri Riza	Miles Films, Surya Citra Media, Trinity Entertainment, Jagartha, Dwidaya Amadeo Gemintang, Barunson E&A, Primeworks Studios	Musical	
2026	Four Seasons in Java	Kamila Andini	Forka Films, Giraffe Pictures, One Two Films, Lemming Films, Ici èt La Productions, PFX, Brand Film, Chada Entertainment, Miles Films, Jagartha, Trinity Entertainment, Teamup Circle Creative, Navvaros	Drama	

^{a}Announced under the title “Operation Pestapora,” the title was changed shortly before its release

=== Web series ===
Release	Title	Season	Directors	Channel	Ref.
2022	If It's Destiny, It Won't Go Anywhere	1	Salman Fariz	YouTube	
2023	If It's Destiny, It Won't Go Anywhere	2	Naya Anindita	YouTube	
2023	Do as Mama Says	1	Muhadkly Acho	YouTube	
2024	Do as Mama Says	2	Ardit Erwandha	YouTube	
2025	Do as Mama Says	3	Arie Kriting	YouTube	
