= Better Off Dead (2025 film) =

2025 comedy film by Kristo Immanuel

- Theatrical release poster
- Indonesian: Tinggal Meninggal
- Directed by: Kristo Immanuel
- Written by: Kristo Immanuel; Jessica Tjiu
- Produced by: Ernest Prakasa; Dipa Andika
- Starring: Omara Esteghlal
- Cinematography: Dimas Bagus Triatma
- Edited by: Ryan Purwoko
- Music by: Nic Edwin
- Production company: Imajinari
- Release date: 14 August 2025 (Indonesia)
- Running time: 120 minutes
- Country: Indonesia
- Language: Indonesian

Better Off Dead (Indonesian: Tinggal Meninggal) is a 2025 Indonesian cringe comedy film directed by Kristo Immanuel in his directorial debut from a screenplay he wrote with Jessica Tjiu. The film stars Omara Esteghlal as Gema, an awkward young man.

It was released in Indonesian theatres on 14 August 2025. It received two nominations at the 2025 Indonesian Film Festival, including Best Original Screenplay for Immanuel and Tjiu.

== Premise ==
Gema, an awkward young man, begins to receive attention from his co-workers after the death of his estranged father. He goes to great lengths to keep their attention.

== Cast ==
- Omara Esteghlal as Gema
  - Jared Ali as little Gema
- Mawar de Jongh as Kerin
- Mario Caesar as Danu
- Muhadkly Acho as Cokro
- Ardit Erwandha as Ilham
- Shindy Huang as Adriana
- Nada Novia as Naya
- Nirina Zubir as Ayu, Gema's mother
- Gilbert Pattiruhu as Gema's father
- Yono Bakrie as careless truck driver

Lutesha, Aurora Ribero, Jerome Kurnia, Jourdy Pranata, Prilly Latuconsina, and Tissa Biani appear as "people in afterlife".

== Production ==
In March 2025, producer Ernest Prakasa announced the project during the presentation of Imajinari Pictures' film slate at the Hong Kong International Film & TV Market. In an interview with Kompas, Immanuel described the film as a "love letter for people with neurodiversity". He further explained that the use of the "breaking the fourth wall" concept in the film represented self-talk, which is commonly seen in neurodivergent individuals. In May 2025, it was reported that Barunson E&A would handle the film's international remake rights, along with other Imajinari films.

Principal photography began in February 2025.

== Music ==
In addition to her role as Kerin in the film, Mawar de Jongh released the film's theme song titled "Tinggal" on 4 June 2025. The song was written by her along with Immanuel, Rizki Maulana Hidayat, and Tarrarin.

== Release ==
Better Off Dead was released in Indonesian theatres on 14 August 2025. It garnered 21,307 admissions on its first day of release and 184,960 admissions throughout its theatrical run. It competed for the Indonesian Screen Awards at the 20th Jogja-NETPAC Asian Film Festival, where it won the Best Film and four other awards. It will have its European premiere at the CinemAsia Film Festival in April 2026.

== Accolades ==
| Award / Film Festival | Date of ceremony | Category | Recipient(s) | Result | Ref. |
|---|---|---|---|---|---|
| Festival Film Bandung | 31 October 2025 | Highly Commended Leading Actor | Omara Esteghlal | Nominated | |
| Festival Film Bandung | 31 October 2025 | Highly Commended Screenplay | Kristo Immanuel and Jessica Tjiu | Nominated | |
| Indonesian Film Festival | 20 November 2025 | Best Original Screenplay | Kristo Immanuel and Jessica Tjiu | Nominated | |
| Indonesian Film Festival | 20 November 2025 | Best Sound | Syaifullah Praditya | Nominated | |
| Jogja-NETPAC Asian Film Festival | 6 December 2025 | Indonesian Screen Award for Best Film | Kristo Immanuel | Won | |
| Jogja-NETPAC Asian Film Festival | 6 December 2025 | Indonesian Screen Award for Best Directing | Kristo Immanuel | Won | |
| Jogja-NETPAC Asian Film Festival | 6 December 2025 | Indonesian Screen Award for Best Performance | Omara Esteghlal | Won (Note: Shared with Afiqa Kirana for her performance in The Period of Her.) | |
| Jogja-NETPAC Asian Film Festival | 6 December 2025 | Indonesian Screen Award for Best Editing | Ryan Purwoko | Won | |
| Jogja-NETPAC Asian Film Festival | 6 December 2025 | Indonesian Screen Award for Best Screenplay | Kristo Immanuel and Jessica Tjiu | Won | |
