= KKN di Desa Penari =

2022 Indonesian supernatural horror film

- Film Poster
- Directed by: Awi Suryadi
- Written by: Lele Maila; Gerald Mamahit
- Based on: KKN di Desa Penari by SimpleMan
- Produced by: Manoj Punjabi
- Starring: Tissa Biani; Adinda Thomas; Achmad Megantara; Aghniny Haque; Calvin Jeremy; Fajar Nugraha
- Cinematography: Ipung Rachmat Syaiful
- Edited by: Firdauzi Trizkiyanto; Denny Rihardie
- Music by: Ricky Lionardi
- Production companies: MD Pictures; Pichouse Films
- Distributed by: MD Entertainment
- Release date: April 30, 2022
- Running time: 121 minutes (PG 13+ cut version); 130 minutes (17+ uncensored version); 175 minutes (extended cut version)
- Country: Indonesia
- Languages: Indonesian; Javanese
- Budget: Rp 15 billion $1 million
- Box office: $26 million

KKN di Desa Penari (lit. 'KKN in the Dancer's Village') is a 2022 Indonesian supernatural horror film directed by Awi Suryadi, based on a viral Twitter thread of the same name (later rewritten as a novel) by SimpleMan, produced by MD Pictures and its subsidiary, Pichouse Films. This film stars Tissa Biani, Adinda Thomas, and Achmad Megantara. This film released on April 30, 2022, after several delays due to the COVID-19 pandemic. Upon its release, it became the highest-grossing film in Indonesian history, but on June 1, 2025, the record was broken by the film Jumbo.

An extended version subtitled Luwih Dowo Luwih Medeni was released on December 29, 2022. A prequel titled Badarawuhi di Desa Penari was released in 2024.

== Plot ==
In 2009, six university students—Nur, Widya, Ayu, Bima, Anton, and Wahyu—participated in a community service project (KKN) in a remote village in East Java. Upon arrival, the village head, Pak Prabu, warns them not to cross a forbidden gate separating the village from a forest area known as Tapak Tilas. Despite initially settling into village life, the students soon begin experiencing disturbing supernatural events.

Nur and Widya encounter apparitions while bathing, including a black figure and a woman dressed as a traditional Javanese dancer. Shortly after, Widya becomes possessed and performs a ritual dance, later having no memory of the incident. Nur, who suffers persistent headaches, visits the village shaman, Mbah Buyut, and learns that she is being followed by the spirit of an old woman. Mbah Buyut also discovers that Widya has attracted the attention of a powerful supernatural entity, signaled by her altered perception after drinking ritual coffee.

Bima grows increasingly withdrawn, frequently disappearing at night, while Anton hears mysterious voices from his room and discovers offerings hidden beneath his bed. Tensions rise when Nur witnesses an argument between Bima and Ayu over a bracelet intended for Widya. The situation escalates when villagers raid the students’ lodging after collectively hallucinating Widya as a snake. Although Pak Prabu suggests ending the program, Ayu insists they continue. Meanwhile, Widya and Wahyu become lost in the forest and unknowingly attend a supernatural dance gathering, returning with food that later transforms into a monkey’s corpse.

Suspecting a deeper violation, Nur investigates Tapak Tilas and discovers that Bima and Ayu have been secretly meeting there. Bima confesses that he encountered a supernatural dancer named Dawu during his first night in the village and was instructed to serve her to protect Widya from harm. He explains that the bracelet functioned as a protective charm. Nur accuses Dawu of deception, believing that Bima has been manipulated. Shortly afterward, Widya becomes possessed again and warns Nur not to interfere. Nur later learns that Ayu placed the bracelet among Widya’s belongings in exchange for permission to continue her relationship with Bima.

Determined to end the KKN, Nur urges the group to leave immediately. That night, however, Bima returns to Tapak Tilas, followed by Widya, who witnesses a supernatural dance at an abandoned pavilion. At the same time, Nur finds Ayu gravely ill. Villagers later discover Bima near death at Tapak Tilas. Mbah Buyut reveals that Dawu is a title rather than an individual name, and that the entity tormenting the students is Badarawuhi, the spirit ruler of the village.

Entering the spirit realm known as Angkoromurko, Mbah Buyut attempts to rescue the victims. Widya is saved, but Bima and Ayu cannot be recovered. Mbah Buyut explains that Bima repeatedly engaged in sexual relations with Badarawuhi, whose offspring manifest as snakes that bind him within the spirit world. Ayu is condemned to replace Widya as Badarawuhi’s chosen dancer. As punishment for violating Tapak Tilas, both Bima and Ayu are trapped in Angkoromurko.

In the epilogue, Bima is revealed to have died four days after the remaining students leave the village, while Ayu dies three months later. Four years afterward, Nur and Widya recount their experiences in a documentary interview under pseudonyms. In a mid-credits scene, Nur visits a religious leader, who informs her that the old woman who protected her was the spirit Mbah Dok.

== Cast ==
- Tissa Biani as Nur
- Adinda Thomas as Widya
- Achmad Megantara as Bima
- Aghniny Haque as Ayu
- Calvin Jeremy as Anton
- Fajar Nugraha as Wahyu
- Kiki Narendra as Prabu
- Aulia Sarah as Badarawuhi
- Aty Cancer as Bu Sundari
- Diding Boneng as Mbah Buyut
- Dewi Sri as Mbah Dok
- Andri Mashadi as Ilham
- Lydia Kandou as Widya's mother (extended version only)

== Release ==
The film was released on April 30, 2022. Trans7 acquired the film's broadcasting rights, premiering it on December 30, 2023.

== Reception ==
This film broke the record as the highest-grossing Indonesian film of all time, with the number of tickets selling at least 9.233.847 viewers as of September 8, 2022. It replaced the position of Warkop DKI Reborn: Jangkrik Boss! Part 1 by Anggy Umbara which held the record for the highest-grossing Indonesian film of all time for almost six years. However, on June 1, 2025, Jumbo managed to replace this film as the highest-grossing Indonesian film.

== See also ==
- KKN (Student study service)
- KKN di Desa Penari (novel)
