= Agak Laen: Menyala Pantiku! =

- Theatrical release poster
- Directed by: Muhadkly Acho
- Screenplay by: Muhadkly Acho
- Produced by: Dipa Andika; Ernest Prakasa
- Starring: Boris Bokir; Indra Jegel; Oki Rengga; Bene Dion
- Cinematography: Aga Wahyudi
- Edited by: Ryan Purwoko
- Music by: Ofel Obaja Setiawan
- Production company: Imajinari
- Distributed by: Antenna Entertainments
- Release date: November 27, 2025 (Indonesia)
- Running time: 119 minutes
- Country: Indonesia
- Languages: Indonesian; Batak

Agak Laen: Menyala Pantiku! is a 2025 Indonesian comedy film directed and written by Muhadkly Acho. It serves as a standalone sequel to Agak Laen and stars the hosts of the Agak Laen podcast—Bene Dion, Oki Rengga, Boris Bokir, and Indra Jegel. The story follows four police officers whose careers are at risk after failing to solve the murder of a mayor’s child. They are given one final chance: to go undercover and infiltrate a nursing home in search of the killer.

Following the success of the first film, producer Ernest Prakasa announced a sequel to Agak Laen on the final day of its theatrical run, produced by Imajinari. The sequel was later revealed under the title Agak Laen: Menyala Pantiku! and premiered in theaters on 27 November 2025.

The film was a major commercial success, surpassing the achievements of its predecessor. It drew 11 million viewers to theaters, making it the highest-grossing Indonesian film of all time.

== Plot ==
Bene, Boris, Jegel, and Oki are police officers in Yamakarta (based on Jakarta) investigating an illegal exchange at a warehouse. After an extended fight, they discover they have attacked the Police Chief's nephew and are reprimanded by Ario. Their financial troubles are revealed: Jegel supports his mother, Bene pays his sister's university fees, Oki faces his wife's childbirth expenses, and Boris is divorcing Gina while disputing custody of their daughter, Aluna.

Ario tells Chief Yunus that the investigation into the murder of mayor's son Freddy has led to a nursing home. He proposes giving the four officers the case, but Yunus assigns someone else. Meanwhile, nursing-home staff Ayu, Tantri, and Martha care for residents including blind Oma Ida, Jihan, Koh Acim, Karni, and Darso, a former soldier who served in Timor. Three officers sent by Yunus are rejected for caretaker positions by owner Linda Rajagukguk. Ario then sends Bene, Oki, Boris, and Jegel; Bene believes his Batak heritage will help him connect with Linda. Only Bene and Jegel attend the interview, as Oki and Boris are at court.

Linda can employ only two male caretakers, so Jegel proposes that Oki and Boris infiltrate the home disguised as a married elderly couple. Oki angrily resists but eventually agrees, with Oki disguised as an elderly woman and Boris as an elderly man. While Bene and Jegel work there, Jegel develops a father-son bond with Koh Acim. The four investigate the residents, identifying Oma Ida, Jihan, Koh Acim, Darso, and Karni as suspects. During a diversion, Bene and Jegel search Linda's office for records and later investigate the suspects' rooms. They even use ghost disguises, referencing the first film, to test whether Oma Ida is genuinely blind, accidentally frightening Linda and the other caretakers instead.

When Jihan secretly leaves the home, the four follow her to a graveyard before retreating after encountering her son-in-law. Later, they claim Oki and Boris were on a married-couple date; Linda asks them to kiss because it reminds her of her parents. They reluctantly comply, leaving Oki furious with Jegel.

A new clue reveals that Freddy's murderer is left-handed. Bene gives Jegel a Proclamation Day competition form, which he passes to Koh Acim and notices that Acim is left-handed and has forgotten his hearing aid. The four confront him, but Boris becomes distressed when Gita announces she is moving to Malaysia. The commotion causes Koh Acim to suffer a heart attack, and Linda orders the officers to leave.

The four are soon dishonourably discharged for violating ethical codes, and the incident goes viral. Jegel visits Acim in hospital to apologise, where Acim confesses to killing Freddy. Acim's daughter, who worked at Freddy's club, died after being harassed by Freddy and falling down the stairs. Freddy later offered Acim money as compensation, but Acim refused. Freddy attacked him with a knife, and Acim killed him in self-defence. Acim gives Jegel the location of the money Freddy had offered him.

Jegel suggests using it to settle Acim's medical debts. The four recover the money from beneath a mosque, with Boris and Bene amusingly wearing flamboyant Kyai outfits. They return it to Acim, who has a vision of his daughter before dying.

After Acim's funeral, the four give the money to Linda according to his final wish. It funds renovations, and they are rehired at the nursing home. Boris arranges for Gina to work there as the cook with Aluna, while Ario bids farewell before being transferred. Days later, Oma Ida's son, Fajar, finally visits her.

== Cast ==
- Bene Dion as Bene
- Boris Bokir as Boris
- Indra Jegel as Jegel
- Oki Rengga as Oki
- Gita Bhebhita as Linda Rajagukguk
- Tissa Biani as Ayu
- Boah Sartika as Tantri
- Priska Baru Segu as Martha
- Chew Kin Wah as Koh Acim
- Jajang C. Noer as Jihan
- Jarwo Kwat as Karni
- Tika Panggabean as Ida
- Egi Fedly as Darso
- Ariyo Wahab as AKP Ario Setiawan
- Surya Saputra as Police Chief Yunus
- Ayushita as Gina
- Queen Lubis as Aluna
- Mario Caesar as Fredy
- Shindy Huang as Siska
- Hotma Tanjung as Jegel's uncle
- Lege Marbun as Bene's younger brother
- Anggi Rantika as Oki's wife
- Benedictus Siregar as an intelligence officer
- Lolox as Cantika
- Azizah Hanum as a newsreader
- Kristo Immanuel as Kristo Emon
- Fajar Sadboy as Himself
