= Becoming Human (film) =

2025 Cambodian film by Polen Ly

- International promotional poster
- Khmer: ជាតិជាមនុស្សា
- Directed by: Polen Ly
- Written by: Polen Ly
- Produced by: Daniel Mattes
- Starring: Serak Savorn; Piseth Chhun
- Cinematography: Son Doan
- Edited by: Kavich Neang
- Music by: Jean-Charles Bastion; Pierre Édouard Dumora
- Production company: Anti-Archive
- Distributed by: Lights On
- Release date: 29 August 2025 (Venice)
- Running time: 99 minutes
- Country: Cambodia
- Language: Khmer

Becoming Human (Khmer: ជាតិជាមនុស្សា, romanized: cheate chea mnoussaea) is a 2025 Cambodian supernatural drama film written and directed by Polen Ly. It stars Serak Savorn and Piseth Chhun.

The film had its world premiere in the Biennale College Cinema section of the 82nd Venice International Film Festival on 29 August 2025. It was also selected as the Cambodian entry for the Best International Feature Film at the 99th Academy Awards.

== Premise ==
A guardian spirit of an abandoned cinema wanders the world, witnessing its brutality, and contemplates whether to become human again or remain a homeless ghost.

== Cast ==
- Serak Savorn as Thida
- Piseth Chhun as Hai

== Production ==
In December 2024, the project was selected by the Biennale College Cinema and received a €200,000 production grant. In an interview with Fred Film Radio, Ly revealed that the film was inspired by the Cambodian "vibrant" film industry during the 1940s to 1960s before the Cambodian genocide.

== Release ==
Becoming Human had its world premiere at the 82nd Venice International Film Festival on 29 August 2025 at the Biennale College Cinema section. Prior to its premiere, Lights On acquired the film's world rights. It had its Asian premiere at the 30th Busan International Film Festival at the Window on Asian Cinema section. It competed for the Sutherland Trophy at the 2025 BFI London Film Festival.

It will be screened in the revamped section Crosscut Asia+ of 39th Tokyo International Film Festival in late October 2026.

== Reception ==
Blake Simons of IndieWire graded the film a "B–" and praised Ly's ability to "slow walk through memory, identity, and place", comparing it to the work of Apichatpong Weerasethakul and Tsai Ming-liang.

=== Accolades ===
Award / Film Festival	Date of ceremony	Category	Recipient(s)	Result	Ref.
BFI London Film Festival	19 October 2025	Sutherland Trophy	Polen Ly	Nominated	
Golden Horse Awards	22 November 2025	NETPAC Award	Polen Ly	Nominated	
Jogja-NETPAC Asian Film Festival	6 December 2025	Golden Hanoman Award	Polen Ly	Won	
Jogja-NETPAC Asian Film Festival	6 December 2025	NETPAC Award	Polen Ly	Won	

== See also ==
- List of submissions to the 99th Academy Awards for Best International Feature Film
- List of Cambodian submissions for the Academy Award for Best International Feature Film
