= Lutesha =

Indonesian actress and model (born 1994)

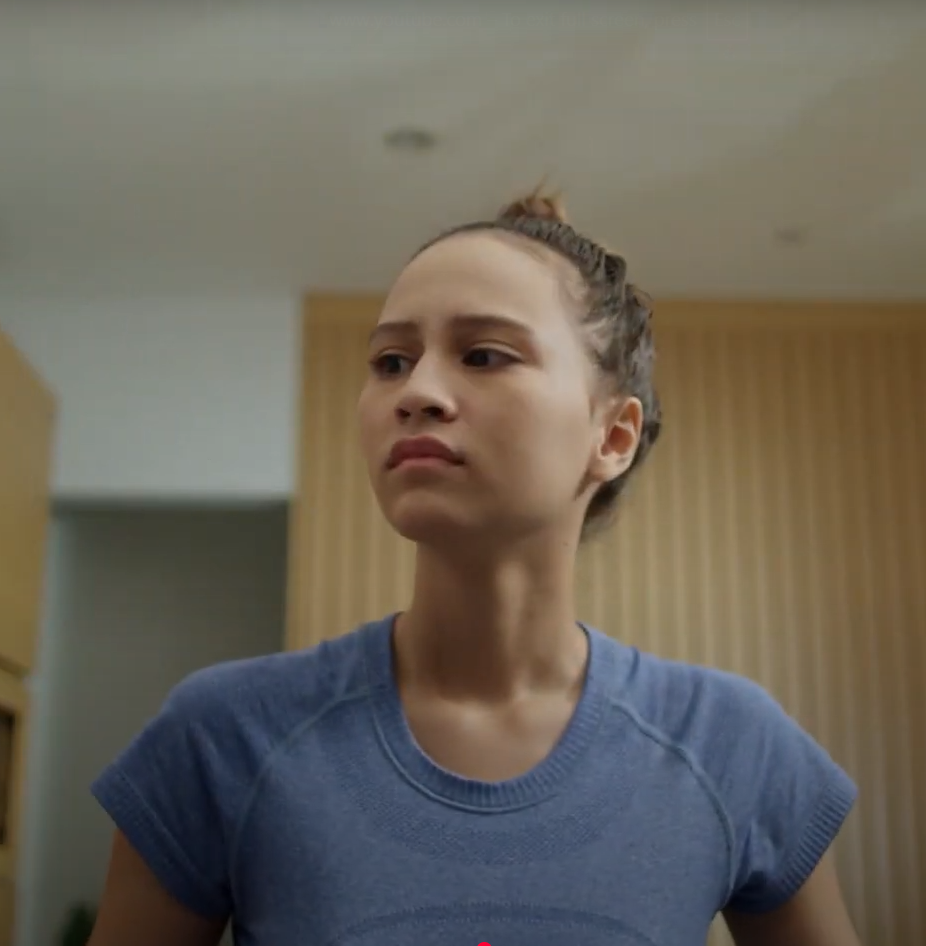
- Born: Lutesha Sadhewa; June 23, 1994 (age 32); Jakarta, Indonesia
- Education: University of Indonesia
- Occupations: Actress; Model
- Agent: KITE Entertainment
- Relatives: Idrus Nasir Djajadiningrat (grandfather)

Lutesha Sadhewa (born 23 June 1994) is an Indonesian actress and model of Acehnese-Bantenese descent. Lutesha is an acronym for La Luna Tesha. She is the granddaughter of Indonesian diplomat and naval officer Idrus Nasir Djajadiningrat. Lutesha has appeared in a number of Indonesian films, including the Netflix feature The Big 4 (2022), and co-starred in Virgin the Series (2022) on Disney+.

== Early life ==
Lutesha was born on June 23, 1994, in Jakarta, Indonesia. She is the second child of three siblings, and the granddaughter of Indonesian diplomat and naval officer Idrus Nasir Djajadiningrat. She is often called Ute. She attended high school at SMA Plus Pembangunan Jaya; while a student there, she visited Turkey, Switzerland, and the Czech Republic on a cultural mission, performing traditional Indonesian dance.

Growing up, she says that modeling and acting weren't on her mind, she would say she wanted to be a veterinarian; in high school, she found that meant studying science and put the idea aside. Aiming for graphic design, she took preparatory art courses at Villa Merah, intending to apply for fine arts, but says she had difficulty with drawing. She learned graphic design in university by handling promotional material like posters and T-shirts for student events in her department. She also worked as a model, having to juggle class and exam schedules with her bookings. She graduated from the University of Indonesia with a Bachelor of Arts in Dutch literature, a choice influenced by having a Dutch-German great-great grandmother.

== Career ==
Lutesha began modeling by participating in the GoGirl! Look 2013 magazine modeling competition when she was 19 and in university; she later appeared as a Go Girl cover model. She also interned in the marketing department at fashion company Tinkerlust in 2016. After graduation, she worked as a social media manager at an art gallery, living in Bali and commuting to Jakarta for modeling jobs.

Following an unsuccessful audition in 2017 for Galih & Ratna, her career in acting began the same year with the role of Suki in the film My Generation, for which she was nominated Best New Actress in the annual Indonesian Maya Awards. After shooting My Generation, Lutesha remained in Jakarta, working as a graphic designer in a creative agency. Over the course of her first four films, My Generation, Ambu, Glorious Days, and May the Devil Take You Too, she continued working as a graphic designer, as a fallback in case her film career stalled.

Her first three film roles had Lutesha worried about being typecast: "The characters were always depressed children, disobedient to their parents, emo, or cold and snappy. Maybe because I'm quiet and have a fierce resting bitch face like that every day." (Note: From the Indonesian: "Itu kan karakternya selalu anak yang depresi, durhaka membangkang orangtua, emo, atau yang ketus dingin gitu. Mungkin karena pendiam dan resting bitch face yang galak-galak gitu ya sehari-hari gue.")

In 2022, Lutesha co-starred as Alpha, a member of the titular team of assassins in the Netflix feature, The Big 4, and as Raya Fitri, one of a group of high school students investigating the death of a classmate, in the mini-series, Virgin the Series, on Disney+.

In 2023, she appeared in 13 Bombs in Jakarta, and co-starred in Ali Topan. NME noted of 13 Bombs, "Lutesha struggles to be a team player and keep her natural charisma in check, ... underlining how restraint remains her Achilles’ heel as an actor", and that she "proves in Ali Topan that she has the potential to be among the finest actors of her generation."

In 2024, she co-starred as Dhea in Love Unlike in K-Dramas, a romantic drama about a love triangle. Commenting on the enduring appeal of the love triangle trope, she said, "Perhaps it's because the socially acceptable love, especially in the heteronormative sense, is the one consisting of two persons only: a man and a woman. Hence, when romance, particularly in films, grows more complicated, it gets more interesting as well."

== Personal life ==
On March 23, 2022, Lutesha married musician and illustrator Arswandaru Cahyo. She considers herself introverted, and says she can have a hard time watching her own film performances.

=== Education ===
- SMA Plus Pembangunan Jaya (Pembangunan Jaya Highschool), Social Science
- Faculty of Humanities - University of Indonesia, Bachelor of Arts in Dutch Literature (graduated)

== Filmography ==
=== Film ===
Original Indonesian titles in parentheses.

Year	Title	Role	Note
2017	My Generation	Suki	
2019	Ambu	Nona	
2019	Glorious Days (Bebas; lit. Free)	Suci Eliana	
2020	May the Devil Take You Too (Sebelum Iblis Menjemput Ayat 2)	Kristi	
2021	Photocopier (Penyalin Cahaya)	Farah Natia	
2022	Keramat 2: Caruban Larang	Ute	
2022	Piknik Pesona	Aya	Segment: "S(Aya)"
2022	The Big 4	Alpha	
2023	A Long Way to Come Home (Jalan yang Jauh, Jangan Lupa Pulang)	Ani Suryani / Honey	
2023	Dear David	Anya	
2023	Panduan Mempersiapkan Perpisahan	Demetria Florencia / Demi	
2023	Ketika Berhenti di Sini	Untari Rahmadini	
2023	13 Bombs in Jakarta (13 Bom di Jakarta)	Agnes	
2024	Ali Topan	Anna Karenina	
2024	Heartbreak Motel	Lutesha	Cameo
2024	Love Unlike in K-Dramas (Cinta Tak Seindah Drama Korea)	Dhea	
2025	Goodbye, Farewell (Sampai Jumpa, Selamat Tinggal)	Vanya	
2025	Better off Dead (Tinggal Meninggal)	Citizen of Afterlife	Cameo
2025	Rest Area	Zizi	
2025	Lavender Marriage	Nona Saraswati	
2026	Sleep No More (Monster Pabrik Rambut)	Ida	World Premiere in Berlinale
2026	Rainbow on Mars (Pelangi di Mars)	Pratiwi	
2026	Cerita Lila	Tari	
2026	The Art of Seducing God (Seni Merayu Tuhan)	Sophia	
2027	Queen of Malacca (Ratu Malaka) †	Layla	Post-production
TBA	Skyline: Warpath †		Post-production
TBA	Sahabat Anak †	Dela	Post-production
TBA	The Big 4: Badai Pasti Kembali †	Alpha	In production
TBA	Broken Mirror †	Sani	Post-production

Key
†	Denotes films that have not yet been released

- TBA: To be announced

=== Short film ===
Year	Title	Role	Note
2012	The Junk Society	N/A	Short film by Chelsea Islan
2019	Behind the Scene: Behind the Scene (Di Balik Layar Behind the Scene)	Tamara	National Film's Day: Netflix Campaign
2021	You and Me in Low Angle	Leila	Also credit as Wardrobe and Make Up
2023	Mushi Hime	Insect Princess	
2024	I Wish I Was...Somewhere Else	Stella	
2024	I Wish I Was...Somewhere Else	Vivyonne	
2024	Kotak	Kota	

=== Web series ===
Year	Title	Role	Note
2018	Halustik	Nikola "Niki" O'Brian	
2019	Unscripted Man	Anjani	
2022	Virgin the Series	Raya Fitri	
2025	Panggilanmu Sedang Dialihkan	Mita	
2025	Pelan-Pelan Sayang (Season 1)	Lutesha	Credit as: Cast, Producer, Director, Writer, 1st AD, Wardrobe & Make Up
2025	Pelan-Pelan Sayang (Season 2)	Lutesha	Credit as: Cast, Producer, Director, Writer, 1st AD, Wardrobe & Make Up
2026	Pelan-Pelan Sayang (Season 3)	Lutesha	Credit as: Cast, Producer, Director, Writer, 1st AD, Wardrobe & Make Up
TBA	Lady Fleur †		
TBA	Remacho (Remako The Series) †		Post-production

Key
†	Denotes films that have not yet been released

- TBA: To be announced

=== Music videos ===
- "Tiger in Your Tank" — Kaveh Kanes (2015)
- "Jalan Terus" — Afgan (2016)
- "Elastic Hearts - Reality Club (2017)
- "True Love" — Elephant Kind (2017)
- "Konon Katanya" — Kunto Aji (2018)
- "Inamorata" — Bam Mastro (2018)
- "Fana Merah Jambu" — Fourtwnty (2018)
- "Mendekati Lugu" — NOAH (2021)
- "Perjumpaan Kita" — Chandra Darusman dan Dian Sastrowardoyo (2021)
- "Terang" — Biru Baru (2022)
- "Janji Palsu" — Hindia (2023)
- "Mengertilah Kasih" — Afgan dan Andi Rianto (2023)
- "Last Night's Kiss" — MANJA (2023)
- "Am I Bothering You?" — Reality Club (2023)
- "Try Again" — The Candle Light Children dan Ridh (2024)
- "Kuning" — Morfem (2024)
- "Primadona" — Adikara (2024)
- "If You Let Me" — Ricecooker dan Dea Panendra (2024; rekaman arsip, lagu tema Cinta tak Seindah Drama Korea)
- "Kabar Bahagia" — Rumahsakit (2024)
- "Tak Sempurna" — Adipati Dolken dan Canti (2025)

== Awards and nominations ==
Year	Award	Category	Title	Result
2017	Maya Awards	Best New Actress	My Generation	Nominated
2017	Dahsyatnya Awards	Outstanding Model in a Music Video	"Jalan Terus" (performed by Afgan)	Nominated (with Afgan)
2019	Asian Academy Creative Awards	Best Actress in a Supporting Role - Regional Winner	Halustik	Won
2023	Maya Awards	Best Supporting Actress	The Big 4	Nominated
2023	Indonesia Film Festival	Best Supporting Actress	The Big 4	Nominated
2023	Indonesia Journalist Film Festival	Best Lead Actress - Action Genre	The Big 4	Nominated
2023	Indonesia Journalist Film Festival	Best Supporting Actress - Drama Genre	A Long Way to Come Home	Nominated
2023	Bandung Film Festival	Commendable Supporting Actress in a Feature Film	A Long Way to Come Home	Won
2024	Indonesia Film Festival	Best Supporting Actress	Goodbye Farewell	Nominated
2026	Festival Film Wartawan	Best Lead Actress - Horror Genre	Cerita Lila	Pending
