= Lost in the Spotlight =

2025 comedy film by Ernest Prakasa

- Promotional poster
- Indonesian: Lupa Daratan
- Directed by: Ernest Prakasa
- Written by: Ernest Prakasa
- Produced by: Dipa Andika; Nurita Anandia
- Starring: Vino G. Bastian
- Cinematography: Bella Panggabean
- Edited by: Ryan Purwoko
- Production company: Imajinari Pictures
- Distributed by: Netflix
- Release dates: 2 December 2025 (Jogja); 11 December 2025 (Netflix)
- Running time: 114 minutes
- Country: Indonesia
- Language: Indonesian

Lost in the Spotlight (Indonesian: Lupa Daratan) is a 2025 Indonesian comedy film directed and written by Ernest Prakasa. It stars Vino G. Bastian as Vino Agustian, an actor who mysteriously loses his talent.

It had its world premiere at the 20th Jogja-NETPAC Asian Film Festival on 2 December 2025. It was released on Netflix on 11 December 2025.

== Premise ==
A narcissistic actor mysteriously loses his acting skills just as he lands the most important role of his career.

== Cast ==
- Vino G. Bastian as Vino Agustian
- Agus Kuncoro as Iksan, Vino's older brother
- Dea Panendra as Dimi, Vino's assistant and best friend
- Emil Kusumo as Hasto, Vino's manager
- Sadha Triyudha as Andi, aspiring director and Vino's best friend
- Mike Lucock as Amir, film producer
- Sheila Dara Aisha as Sheila
- Arswendy Bening Swara as Sudibyo, former president
- Morgan Oey as Morgan Woo
- Lukman Sardi as Lukman Sarbi

== Production ==
In February 2025, Netflix revealed that Lost in the Spotlight is part of the 2025 lineup of Southeast Asian films and television series. It was scheduled to be released in the fourth quarter of 2025. During the film's press conference, Prakasa stated that his aim was to reveal the lesser-known aspects of the showbiz industry through this film.

== Release ==
Lost in the Spotlight had its world premiere at the 20th Jogja-NETPAC Asian Film Festival on 2 December 2025 at the Indonesian Film Showcase section. It was released on Netflix on 11 December 2025.
