= Kristo Immanuel =

Indonesian actor and director (born 1997)

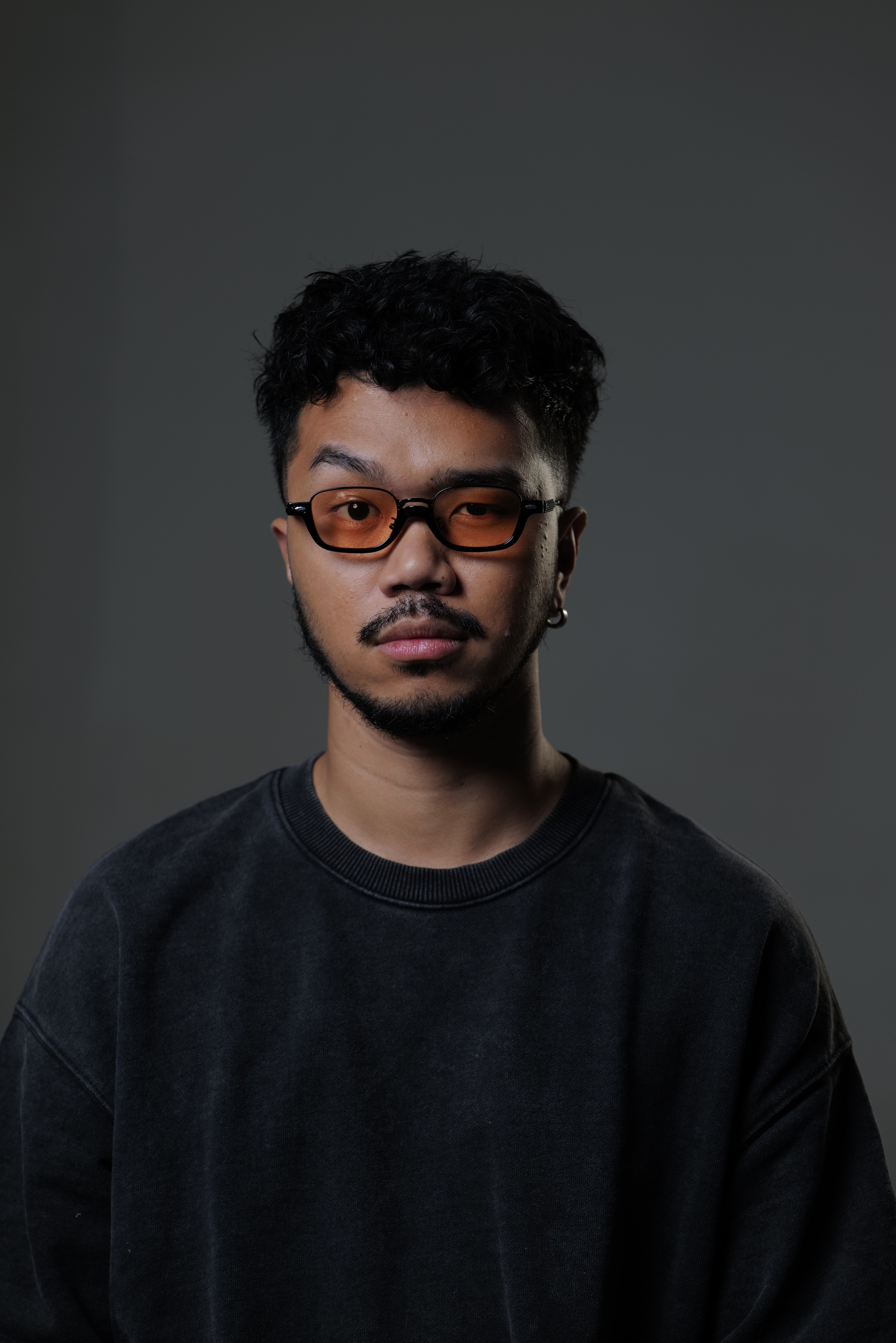
- Born: Kristo Immanuel Caesar; 28 February 1997 (age 29); Jakarta, Indonesia
- Occupations: Actor; internet personality; impressionist; director
- Years active: 2017–present
- Spouse: Jessica Tjiu (m. 2022)

Kristo Immanuel Caesar (born 28 February 1997) is an Indonesian actor, internet personality, impressionist, and director. He rose to prominence in 2019 after his impersonation videos went viral on Instagram. He then has starred in various films, including Timo Tjahjanto's The Big 4 (2022) and Yosep Anggi Noen's 24 Hours with Gaspar (2023). He made his directorial debut with Better Off Dead in 2025, which earned him a nomination for a Citra Award for Best Original Screenplay at the 2025 ceremony.

== Early life ==
Kristo Immanuel Caesar was born on 28 February 1997 in Jakarta, Indonesia. In 2019, a video of him impersonating 120 animated characters went viral on Instagram. He told Kompas that he started learning how to do impressions since he was in primary school. He graduated from Multimedia Nusantara University in 2020, majoring in Film Studies.

== Career ==
In 2019, Immanuel began his acting career by voicing Indonesia's second president Soeharto in the biopic Susi Susanti: Love All. In 2021, he served as an assistant director on Ernest Prakasa's Teka Teki Tika and also played a small role in the film. He landed his first major acting role in Timo Tjahjanto's action comedy film The Big 4, for which won the Maya Award for Best Breakthrough Actor at the 2022 ceremony. In 2023, he starred in Yosep Anggi Noen's crime drama 24 Hours with Gaspar and Fajar Nugros' psychological thriller Sleep Call. In 2024, he co-wrote a jukebox musical featuring the music of Tulus, Interaksi, along with Nuya Susanto and Pradipta Kartika.

In 2025, Immanuel made his directorial debut with the cringe comedy film Better Off Dead, starring Omara Esteghlal in the leading role. Immanuel and co-writer Jessica Tjiu received a nomination for the Citra Award for Best Original Screenplay for their work.

== Personal life ==
In February 2022, Immanuel married Jessica Tjiu in a ceremony in Central Jakarta. The couple co-wrote the screenplay for his film Better Off Dead.

In an interview with Tempo, he revealed that he had been diagnosed with attention deficit hyperactivity disorder. He described his film Better Off Dead as a "love letter for people with neurodiversity". He explained that the "breaking the fourth wall" concept used in the film represented self-talk, which is commonly seen in neurodivergent individuals.

== Filmography ==
=== Film ===
Year	Title	Role	Notes
2019	Susi Susanti: Love All	Soeharto	Voice
2021	Teka-Teki Tika	Tony	Also as assistant director
2022	The Big 4	Pelor	
2023	Star Syndrome	Joko William	
2023	Sleep Call	Bayu	
2023	Srimulat: Hidup Memang Komedi	President	Voice
2023	24 Hours with Gaspar	Njet	
2024	Agak Laen	Kristo	
2024	Kaka Boss	Ajit	Also as assistant director
2024	The Shadow Strays	Jeki Djamil	
2024	Bolehkah Sekali Saja Kumenangis	Agoy	
2024	My Annoying Brother	Fauzan	
2024	Love Unlike in K-Dramas	Dito	
2025	Better Off Dead	Christo Immanuel	Uncredited cameo; Also as director, screenwriter, and co-executive producer
2025	Agak Laen: Menyala Pantiku!		Post-production

=== Television ===
Year	Title	Role	Network	Notes
2020	Twisted	Bobi	Vision+	Episode: "Jangan Teriak"
2023	Imperfect the Series	Rudy Hadihartono	WeTV, Iflix	2 episodes

=== Stage ===
Year	Production	Role	Location	Notes
2022	Teater Musikal Cek Toko Sebelah	Erwin	Teater Jakarta, Taman Ismail Marzuki, Jakarta (9–11 December 2022)	
2024	Interaksi	—N/a		As playwright
