= Ardit Erwandha =

Indonesian actor and comedian (born 1991)

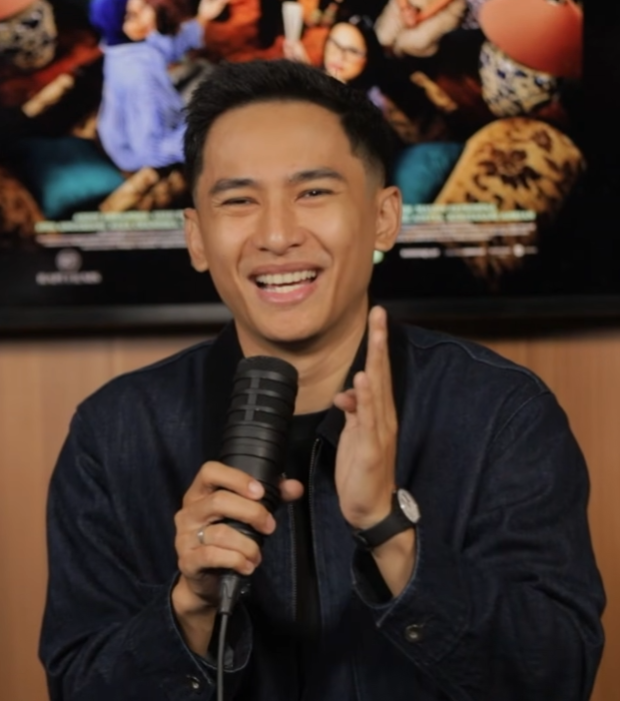
- Born: Arditya Taqwa Erwandha; 9 October 1991 (age 34); Samarinda, East Kalimantan, Indonesia
- Occupations: Actor; comedian; screenwriter; director
- Spouse: Suci Asmarani Hasan (m. 2019)
- Children: 1

Arditya Taqwa Erwandha (born 9 October 1991) is an Indonesian stand-up comedian, actor, screenwriter, and director.

== Early life and career ==
Ardit was born on 9 October 1991 in Samarinda, East Kalimantan. He is the eldest of four siblings; his younger brother was a finalist on the singing reality show Rising Star Indonesia. Ardit graduated from the Mulawarman University, where he obtained a bachelor's degree in international relations.

In 2014, he was a finalist in the fourth season of Street Comedy Indonesia, rising to prominence that same year when he led the Stand Up Indo Samarinda community to perform in a Kompas TV stand-up comedy competition. Ardit's first solo comedy tour included the renowned comedian Ernest Prakasa, subsequently joining a comedians' community in West Jakarta.

In 2016, Ardit successfully qualified as a contestant on the sixth season of Stand Up Comedy Indonesia Kompas TV through auditions in Surabaya. He made it to the grand finals and finished as runner-up.

Among Ardit's acting roles are Petualangan Sherina 2 (2023), 2024 horror films Agak Laen and Dancing Village: The Curse Begins, as well as 2025 productions Better Off Dead and The Elixir, a Netflix movie depicting a zombie apocalypse.

== Private life ==
Ardit became engaged to Suci Asmarani Hasan, a reporter at a television station in East Kalimantan in October 2018. Three months later, on 19 January 2019, they married in Samarinda. On 9 October 2019, Ardit's 28th birthday, the couple had a daughter named Seira Dzakiya Arshani. An ethnic Banjarese, Ardit speaks Banjarese language, stating in an interview in June 2023 that he feels nostalgia for Benjarese due to lack of speakers in Jakarta, where he resides.
