= List of highest-grossing films in Indonesia =

The following are lists of the highest-grossing domestic and international films in Indonesia with gross revenue in Indonesian Rupiah and the number of tickets sold nationwide.

== Domestic & International films by admissions ==
This colour signifies the film is still showing in Cinema.

Rank	Title	Admissions	Year	Country
1	Avengers: Endgame (Note: Includes the 2026 re-release under the title Avengers Endgame: Encore. Original release total admission: 10,976,338.)	12,005,641	2019	United States
2	Agak Laen: Menyala Pantiku!	11,000,866	2025	Indonesia
3	Jumbo	10,233,002	2025	Indonesia
4	KKN di Desa Penari (Note: Includes the December 2022 re-release with longer duration. Original release total admission: 9,233,847.)	10,061,033	2022	Indonesia
5	Agak Laen	9,126,607	2024	Indonesia
6	Avengers: Infinity War	8,220,812	2018	United States
7	Spider-Man: No Way Home	8,215,014	2021	United States
8	Avatar: The Way of Water	7,096,798	2022	United States
9	Spider-Man: Brand New Day	6,977,396	2026	United States
10	Warkop DKI Reborn: Jangkrik Boss! Part 1	6,858,616	2016	Indonesia
11	Satan's Slaves 2: Communion	6,391,982	2022	Indonesia
12	Dilan 1990	6,315,664	2018	Indonesia
13	Avatar: Fire and Ash	6,267,893	2025	United States
14	Doctor Strange in the Multiverse of Madness	6,214,148	2022	United States
15	Captain Marvel	5,978,549	2019	United States
16	Miracle in Cell No. 7	5,852,916	2022	Indonesia
17	Vina: Sebelum 7 Hari	5,815,945	2024	Indonesia
18	Spider-Man: Far From Home	5,800,000	2019	United States
19	Aquaman	5,783,637	2018	United States
20	Furious 7	5,714,930	2015	United States

== Domestic films by admissions ==
This list is sorted by the number of tickets sold nationwide, according to the filmindonesia.or.id. However, the information on filmindonesia.or.id was accrued only from 2007, making some films that was released before 2007 are not included or do not have an accurate number of admissions. Number of admissions for films that was released before 2007 was collected from trusted articles or publications.

This colour signifies the film is still showing in Cinema.

Rank	Title	Admissions	Year
1	Agak Laen: Menyala Pantiku!	11,000,866	2025
2	Jumbo	10,233,002	2025
3	KKN di Desa Penari (Note: Includes the December re-release with longer duration.)	10,061,033	2022
4	Agak Laen	9,126,607	2024
5	Warkop DKI Reborn: Jangkrik Boss! Part 1	6,858,616	2016
6	Satan's Slaves 2: Communion	6,391,982	2022
7	Dilan 1990	6,315,664	2018
8	Miracle in Cell No. 7	5,852,916	2022
9	Vina: Sebelum 7 Hari	5,815,945	2024
10	Dilan 1991	5,253,411	2019
11	Sewu Dino	4,886,406	2023
12	Kang Mak from Pee Mak	4,860,565	2024
13	Ipar Adalah Maut	4,776,533	2024
14	Pabrik Gula	4,726,760	2025
15	Laskar Pelangi	4,719,453	2008
16	Habibie & Ainun	4,583,641	2012
17	Satan's Slaves	4,206,103	2017
18	Warkop DKI Reborn: Jangkrik Boss! Part 2	4,083,190	2017
19	Dancing Village: The Curse Begins	4,015,120	2024
20	Grave Torture	4,000,826	2024
21	Bila Esok Ibu Tiada	3,927,731	2024
22	Verses of Love	3,676,210	2008
23	Ada Apa Dengan Cinta? 2	3,665,509	2016
24	Danur: The Last Chapter	3,619,493	2026
25	Ghost in the Cell	3,376,865	2026
26	Jangan Buang Ibu	3,351,616	2026
27	Suzzanna: Buried Alive	3,346,185	2018
28	Di Ambang Kematian	3,302,047	2023
29	Petaka Gunung Gede	3,242,843	2025
30	Milea: Suara dari Dilan	3,157,817	2020
31	Air Mata di Ujung Sajadah	3,127,861	2023
32	Sore: Wife from the Future	3,119,896	2025
33	172 Days	3,087,826	2023
34	My Stupid Boss	3,052,657	2016
35	Wait Until I Make It	3,008,239	2026
36	Komang	3,002,303	2025
37	Missing Home	2,886,121	2022
38	Jalan Pulang	2,879,216	2025
39	Verses of Love 2	2,840,159	2017
40	Ivanna	2,793,775	2022
41	Danur	2,736,391	2017
42	Ada Apa Dengan Cinta?	2,700,000	2002
43	Imperfect	2,662,356	2019
44	Check the Store Next Door	2,642,957	2016
45	Eiffel I'm in Love	2,632,300	2003
46	Hangout	2,620,644	2016
47	Siksa Neraka	2,610,036	2023
48	Danur 2: Maddah	2,572,871	2018
49	Jailangkung	2,550,271	2017
50	Two Blue Stripes	2,538,473	2019

== Domestic films with the highest admissions in opening days ==
The film Dilan 1991 broke the record by getting more than 800,000 tickets on the first day of screening.

Rank	Title	Numbers of admissions		Year	Ref.
Rank	Title	On opening day	Total	Year	Ref.
1	Dilan 1991	800,255	5,253,411	2019	
2	Satan's Slaves 2: Communion	701,891	6,391,982	2022	
3	Milea: Suara dari Dilan	404,762	3,157,817	2020	
4	Dancing Village: The Curse Begins	344,507	4,015,120	2024	
5	Vina: Sebelum 7 Hari	335,812	5,815,945	2024	
6	KKN di Desa Penari	315,486	10,061,033	2022	
7	Warkop DKI Reborn: Jangkrik Boss! Part 2	313,623	4,083,190	2017	
8	Bila Esok Ibu Tiada	301,599	3,927,731	2024	
9	Agak Laen: Menyala Pantiku!	272,846	11,000,866	2025	
10	Warkop DKI Reborn: Jangkrik Boss! Part 1	270,123	6,858,616	2016	

== Highest-grossing international films in Indonesia ==
The statistic on international films' Box office in Indonesia, Box Office Mojo is the only website that provides the box office numbers for international films released in Indonesia.

This colour signifies the film is still showing in Cinema.

Rank	Title	Gross (USD)	Studios	Year
1	Avengers: Endgame	$34,775,278	Walt Disney	2019
2	Spider-Man: No Way Home	$25,747,047	Sony Pictures	2021
3	Avengers: Infinity War	$25,288,929	Walt Disney	2018
4	Doctor Strange in the Multiverse of Madness	$21,009,945	Walt Disney	2022
5	Avatar: The Way of Water	$20,615,163	Walt Disney	2022
6	Captain Marvel	$19,409,550	Walt Disney	2019
7	The Fate of the Furious	$19,329,335	Universal	2017
8	Avatar: Fire and Ash	$18,975,462	Walt Disney	2025
9	Aladdin	$18,092,717	Walt Disney	2019
10	Aquaman	$17,500,000	Warner Bros	2018
11	Spider-Man: Far From Home	$17,183,895	Sony Pictures	2019
12	Furious 7	$16,768,758	Universal	2015
13	Captain America: Civil War	$15,614,225	Walt Disney	2016
14	Fast X	$15,519,515	Universal	2023
15	Avengers: Age of Ultron	$15,504,514	Walt Disney	2015
16	Iron Man 3	$15,308,150	Walt Disney	2013
17	Jumanji: The Next Level	$15,236,980	Sony Pictures	2019
18	Frozen 2	$14,884,821	Walt Disney	2019
19	Batman v Superman: Dawn of Justice	$14,000,000	Warner Bros	2016
20	Jurassic World: Fallen Kingdom	$13,950,645	Universal	2018
21	The Nun	$13,800,000	Warner Bros	2018
22	Joker	$13,500,000	Warner Bros	2019
23	Black Panther: Wakanda Forever	$13,160,734	Walt Disney	2022
24	Jumanji: Welcome to the Jungle	$12,999,018	Sony Pictures	2017
25	Fast & Furious Presents: Hobbs & Shaw	$12,934,025	Universal	2019
26	Thor: Love and Thunder	$12,632,982	Walt Disney	2022
27	The Conjuring 2	$12,500,000	Warner Bros	2016
28	Black Panther	$12,448,743	Walt Disney	2018
29	Transformers: Age of Extinction	$12,402,729	Paramount	2014
30	Spider-Man: Homecoming	$12,335,003	Sony Pictures	2017
31	The Avengers	$11,949,911	Walt Disney	2012
32	Thor: Ragnarok	$11,746,294	Walt Disney	2017
33	Transformers: The Last Knight	$11,712,577	Paramount	2017
34	Transformers: Rise of the Beasts	$11,459,502	Paramount	2023
35	Bumblebee	$10,988,849	Paramount	2019
36	Mission: Impossible – Fallout	$10,950,422	Paramount	2018
37	Justice League	$10,800,000	Warner Bros	2017
38	Venom	$10,709,067	Sony Pictures	2018
39	Aquaman and the Lost Kingdom	$10,700,000	Warner Bros	2023
40	Maleficent: Mistress of Evil	$10,436,032	Walt Disney	2019
41	Jurassic World Dominion	$10,418,417	Universal	2022
42	The Amazing Spider-Man 2	$10,085,684	Sony Pictures	2014
43	Ant-Man and the Wasp	$10,005,439	Walt Disney	2018
44	Annabelle: Creation	$9,800,000	Warner Bros	2017
45	Jurassic World	$9,621,701	Universal	2015
46	The Amazing Spider-Man	$9,537,461	Sony Pictures	2012
47	The Conjuring: Last Rites	$9,500,000	Warner Bros	2025
48	Deadpool & Wolverine	$9,379,015	Walt Disney	2024
49	Moana 2	$9,268,703	Walt Disney	2024
50	Guardians of the Galaxy Vol. 3	$9,259,043	Walt Disney	2023
51	Godzilla x Kong: The New Empire	$9,200,000	Warner Bros	2024
52	The Nun II	$9,200,000	Warner Bros	2023
53	Beauty and the Beast	$9,161,033	Walt Disney	2017
54	Fast & Furious 6	$9,134,211	Universal	2013
55	Insidious: The Last Key	$9,080,255	Sony Pictures	2018

== Animated films by admissions ==
Below is the list of highest-grossing animated films ever in top 10 of Indonesia. Jumbo is currently the highest-grossing animated film in Indonesia.

This colour signifies the film is still showing in Cinema.

List of Animated Film by Admissions in Indonesia
Rank	Title	Admissions	Year	Country
1	Jumbo	10,233,002	2025	Indonesia
2	Frozen 2	4,632,081	2019	United States
3	Moana 2	3,187,999	2024	United States
4	The Lion King (2019)	2,711,309	2019	United States
5	Incredibles 2	2,588,000	2018	United States
6	Minions: The Rise of Gru	2,545,036	2022	United States
7	Demon Slayer: Infinity Castle	2,504,705	2025	Japan
8	Toy Story 5	2,393,403	2026	United States
9	Inside Out 2	2,029,828	2024	United States
10	Toy Story 4	1,964,400	2019	United States

== Timeline of admissions and gross records ==
=== Domestic films by admissions ===
Year	Title	Admissions	Ref.
1973	Ratapan Anak Tiri	467,831	
1974	Bing Slamet Koboi Cengeng	530,013	
1983	Maju Kena Mundur Kena	658,896	
1984	Pengkhianatan G30S/PKI	699,282	
2000	Petualangan Sherina	1,600,000	
2002	Ada Apa Dengan Cinta?	2,700,000	
2008	Verses of Love	3,676,135	
2008	Laskar Pelangi	4,719,453	
2016	Warkop DKI Reborn: Jangkrik Boss! Part 1	6,858,616	
2022	KKN di Desa Penari	10,061,033	
2025	Jumbo	10,233,002	
2026	Agak Laen: Menyala Pantiku!	11,000,866	

=== Foreign films by gross (not adjusted by inflation) ===
Year	Title	Gross (USD)	Ref.
1998	Titanic	$2,989,269	
2007	Spider-Man 3	$5,216,902	
2009	2012	$6,640,261	
2011	Harry Potter and the Deathly Hallows Part 2	$8,229,311	
2012	The Avengers	$11,949,911	
2013	Iron Man 3	$15,308,150	
2015	Furious 7	$16,768,758	
2017	The Fate of the Furious	$19,329,335	
2018	Avengers: Infinity War	$25,288,929	
2019	Avengers: Endgame	$34,775,278	

== See also ==
- Cinema of Indonesia
- Highest-grossing Indonesian horror film
