= Maudy Effrosina =

Indonesian actress

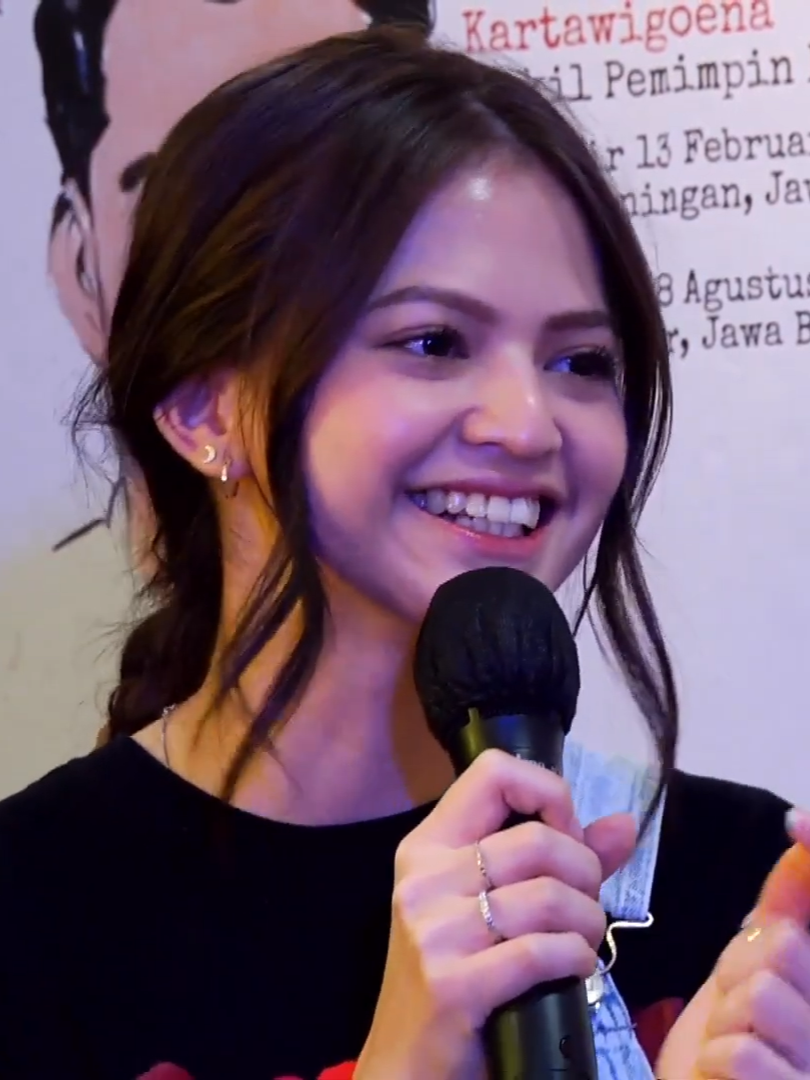
- Maudy in 2022
- Born: Maudy Effrosina Kusuma; 17 November 1995 (age 30); Indonesia
- Education: SMA Negeri 46 Jakarta
- Occupations: Actress; model
- Years active: 2014—now

Maudy Effrosina Kusuma (born 17 November 1995) is an Indonesian actress and model.

== Early life ==
Maudy is the younger sister of Febrian Putra Kusuma, the main character of the series Cinta Bersemi di Putih Abu-Abu the Series and Super ABG. Maudy graduated from SMA Negeri 46 Jakarta and once studied management at Trisakti University, before eventually dropping out.

== Career ==
Maudy started her career in entertainment by representing the Thousand Islands in the Abang None contest in 2014. In the contest, Maudy won the title of Favorite Champion.

Maudy began to enter the acting world through her roles in several FTV titles since 2017. She has received wide recognition since starring a web series Antares in 2021.

Maudy got her first major role through the film Qodrat (2022) as Asha. The film earned her the Tuti Indra Malaon Award for Outstanding Newcomer Actress at the 2022 Maya Cup. It was the first award in her acting career.

== Filmography ==
=== Film ===
Year	Title	Role	Notes
2018	The Perfect Husband	Luna	
2022	Cinta Subuh	Tari	
2022	My Sassy Girl	Teman kencan Gian	
2022	Qodrat	Asha	
2023	Virgo and the Sparklings	Tania	
2024	Pemukiman Setan	Alin Wihanggamapati	
2024	Badarawuhi di Desa Penari	Mila	
2025	Qodrat 2	Asha	

=== Television Series ===
Year	Title	Role	Notes
2020	Catatan Harianku	Areta	Episode: "Cinta Pertama dan Terakhir"
2020	Catatan Harianku	Sheila	Episode: "Detak Jantung di Detik Berbeda"
2021	Catatan Harianku	Nadine	Episode: "Jangan Salahkan Tuhan"
2021	Catatan Harianku	Mega	Episode: "Terlambat Pergi"
2021	Catatan Harianku	Laila	Episode: "Cinta itu Kamu"
2021	Catatan Harianku	Zefa	Episode: "Cinta di Lain Waktu"
2021	Catatan Harianku	Arin	Episode: "Dua Cinta"

=== Web Series ===
Year	Title	Role	Notes
2021	Antares	Karissa Andromeda	
2022	Antares Season 2	Karissa Andromeda	
2022	Modus Operandi	Karina	
2023	Diva	Farah	
2023	Princess & the Boss	Felicia	
2023	96 Jam	Dinda	

=== Television Films ===
- Naga Cinta Neng Geulis (2017)
- Dari Udang Jadi Sayang (2018)
- Princess Cantik Pangeran Sawah (2018)
- Montir Cantik Anti Galau (2018)
- Crazy Rich From Kampoeng Riboet (2018)
- I Love You Sampai Klepek-Klepek (2018)
- Abang Sayur, Abang Sayang (2018)
- Gurih Cinta Telur Asin (2018)
- Martabak Special No. 28 Jatuh Cinta (2018)
- Cinta Antik Nona Ontel (2018)
- Koperasi Simpan Pinjam Cinta (2018)
- Cintaku Padamu Wagelaseh (2018)
- None Betawi dan Oppa Korea (2018)
- Babang Burger Ganteng in Between (2018)
- Si Manis Penjaga Hati yang Tak Pernah Ingkar Janji (2018)
- Kejepret Cinta Pengacara Baik Hati dan Tidak Sombong (2018)
- My Husband My Enemy (2018)
- Literally ini Me vs Mommy (2019)
- Cinta Gudeg Mercon Seng Ada Lawan (2019)
- Cinta Anti Palsu-Palsu Club (2019)
- Oh My Dad, Pliss Deh (2019)
- Jangan Lupa Kasih Cintaku Bintang Lima Ya (2019)
- Aku Tanpamu Bagaikan Ambulan Tanpa Uwiw-Uwiw (2019)
- Resep Cinta Kaki Lima Rasa Bintang Lima (2019)
- Incess Kota Turun Kasta (2019)
- Cinta pada Gigitan Pertama (2019)
- I Love You 3000 Sama Kamu (2019)
- Cewek Cantikku Datang tak Dijemput, Pulang tak Diantar (2019)
- Ketipu Cinta Cewek Gedongan Panjat Sosial (2019)
- Sheyengku Cuma Sama Miss Gincu (2019)
- Jangan Bikin Cintaku Sebatas Teman Tanpa Kepastian (2019)
- I Love You Dibalas I Love You Too (2019)
- Cintaku Ketangkap Guru Berwajib (2019)
- Ayam Digeprek, Cinta Bertindak (2019)
- Cewek Warteg Cintanya Sah Dibayar Tunai (2019)
- Roda-Roda Cinta di Atas Ojek (2019)
- Pantang Pulang Sebelum Jadian (2019)
- Siapa yang Suruh Datang Jakarta? (2019)
- Cintaku Di-share Location ke Hati Kamu (2020)
- Dede Gemes Mentiktok Hatiku (2020)
- Sandiwara Cinta Pangeran Agung Sejagat (2020)
- Pura-Pura Pacaran Demi Konten (2020)
- Cintamu Padaku Kayak Ada Manis-manisnya (2020)
- Lagi, Aku Jatuh Cinta Padamu (2020)
- Ayahku Kabur di Hari Pernikahanku (2021)
- Modal Nasi Bungkus, Balik Modal Jodoh (2021)
- Janji Gak Naksir Mba Pawang Anak? (2022)

== Awards and nominations ==
Year	Awards	Category	Nominated works	Results
2023	Maya Cup	Outstanding Newcomer Actress (Tuti Indra Malaon Award)	Qodrat	Won
