= The Big 4 =

- Release poster
- Directed by: Timo Tjahjanto
- Written by: Timo Tjahjanto; Johanna Wattimena
- Produced by: Timo Tjahjanto; Wicky V. Olindo
- Starring: Abimana Aryasatya; Putri Marino; Lutesha; Arie Kriting; Kristo Immanuel
- Cinematography: Batara Goempar
- Edited by: Dinda Amanda
- Music by: Rooftopsound
- Production companies: Frontier Pictures; Netflix Studios
- Distributed by: Netflix
- Release date: 15 December 2022
- Running time: 141 minutes
- Country: Indonesia
- Language: Indonesian

The Big 4 is a 2022 Indonesian action comedy film written and directed by Timo Tjahjanto. Released by Netflix on 15 December 2022, it tells the story of four retired assassins–played by Abimana Aryasatya, Lutesha, Arie Kriting, and Kristo Immanuel–who spring back into action when they cross paths with a straight-arrow cop (Putri Marino) who is determined to track down an elusive murderer.

Upon release, The Big 4 received mostly positive reviews from critics, and was ranked within the top 10 most-watched titles in 53 countries, including in Indonesia, where it was the top-ranked film. Tjahjanto has expressed intentions to develop a sequel.

== Plot ==
A child is taken into an orphanage, and placed along with other abused children. He watches an older boy (Pelor) being dragged away screaming, taken into a hospital for harvesting his organs. Suddenly, a man (Topan) appears and with the help of a nurse (Alpha), rescues Pelor and then frees all the kids in the orphanage.

Pops (Petrus) is the commander of the Big 4, whose daughter Dina is going to be sworn in as a police officer. He is also friends with Hassan, the police chief, and Dina is closer to him than her own father. While she is being sworn in as officer, an assassin disguised as a flower courier kills Petrus. First Topan, and then Dina find the dead body. Dina believes Topan to be the murderer and shoots at him wounding him, just as he rushes out the back door.

Three years later, Dina is overworked, and Hassan suggests she take a vacation. She visits Paranais Villa on Bersi island, which is the location on an old photo of her father along with 4 children. Topan is at the front desk and gives her a room. She finds a photo of her father at the lobby and Topan says it's his father too. He takes her to a jungle retreat with Baba Jenggo where they give her a bitter potion to drink which causes her to hallucinate temporarily. Pelor comes in with a gun and a fight ensues.

Antonio and his secretary kill several people and take over a Don's turf. They then arrive at the jungle retreat to capture Jenggo, while Pelor runs away. Topan and Dina fight with Antonio and manage to escape to a hideout. While cleaning Topan's wounds, Dina recognizes the scar from the bullet that she shot into the person who left when she saw her father's dead body, and calls Topan a murderer. Pelor meets up with Dina and emphatically denies that Topan could be a murderer and takes her to see Alpha, who convinces Dina that Topan is not a murderer and that they were all trained by Dina's father, Petrus. They learn more about Antonio, called the scorpion of south-east Asia. Topan recalls the last words of Petrus, which was "Suranto", an alias for Antonio, who was the first ever person that Petrus trained.

Antonio teams up with Vinsen to capture or kill Topan. They arrive at Alpha's location and start shooting at them, but Alpha and Dina manage to kill most of them. Alo arrives and uses a bazooka which wounds Dina. Topan and Jenggo revive Dina and flee the scene by boat. Antonio has Pelor as hostage and demands that they meet up where it all started.

Topan and others arm themselves to prepare for their upcoming fight with Antonio. Dina sees the cap that her father wore on the day he was murdered, and Topan says he failed to save Petrus. He also says that Petrus asked him to take care of Dina before he died.

Antonio sees a jeep driving towards his hideout but there's nothing in it except for a time bomb which explodes killing a lot of his men. Topan shoots the rest of them stationed outside the building, and enters with Alpha and Dina, killing the guards inside. Vinsen gets Dina into a room where she kills him with a gun. Alpha and Jenggo fight with Alo, killing her. Antonio fights Topan and then threatens to kill Pelor, but Topan throws a knife at Antonio, making him reel towards the window and fall down several stories to his death.

Dina attempts to handcuff Topan, but he kisses her and handcuffs her to the window instead. The Big 4 escape, and Topan asks Dina to check the cap she's wearing. Dina finds a key attached to the cap before being rescued by the police. The Big 4 drive away in a car hidden in the woods.

Police chief Hassan pleads with Lady Zero about not killing Petrus's daughter. She uses a sword to stab a photo of Topan and says they have "unfinished business".

== Cast ==
- Abimana Aryasatya as Topan
- Putri Marino as Dina
- Lutesha as Alpha
- Arie Kriting as Jenggo
- Kristo Immanuel as Pelor
- Marthino Lio as Suranto/Antonio Sandoval
- Michelle Tahalea as Alo
- Michael Kho as Lengko and Vinsen
- Budi Ros as Petrus
- Adjie N.A. as Bunglon
- Donny Damara as Hassan
- Andri Mashadi as Rudha
- Willem Bevers as Syarief
- Gilbert Pattiruhu as Don
- Marsha Timothy as Lady Zero

== Production ==
Netflix's Director of Content for Southeast Asia, Malobika Banerji, announced the project in September 2021. Filming commenced the following November, with Tjahjanto revealing Aryasatya, Marino, Lutesha, Arie, Kristo, Lio, and Ros as cast members on Instagram. Citing a personal mission to highlight the Eastern part of Indonesia, Tjahjanto chose Bali and Timor as filming locations for the fictional Bersi island, where the majority of the film took place.

== Release ==
Trailer for the film was released in November 2022 ahead of its release on Netflix worldwide on 15 December 2022.

== Reception ==
=== Audience viewership ===
According to Variety, The Big 4 was the second-most-watched non-English language title on Netflix in its first weekend, making the top 10 in 53 countries, including Argentina, Finland, Greece, Mexico, the Philippines, Spain, South Korea, Taiwan, Thailand, and Vietnam, as well as topping the list in Indonesia.

=== Critical response ===
On the review aggregator website Rotten Tomatoes, 91% of 11 critics' reviews are positive, with an average rating of 6.8/10.

Brian Tallerico of RogerEbert.com gave the film 3 out of 4 stars, calling it "The Three Stooges with bazookas" that "takes off [...] with enough rhythm to get you from the intense prologue to the insane final half-hour". Tallerico called the cast "solid from top to bottom", singling out Aryasatya, Marino, and Lio, but criticized the runtime and dialogue.

Johnny Loftus of Decider wrote that the film benefits from a "solid cast" but criticized the clunky setup, broadly comedic fights, and the "sequel tease". Roger Moore of Movie Nation is more critical, calling the film's plot "over-the-top and borderline nonsensical" but praising the action scenes and jokes.
