= Agak Laen =

- Theatrical poster
- Directed by: Muhadkly Acho
- Screenplay by: Muhadkly Acho
- Produced by: Dipa Andika; Ernest Prakasa
- Starring: Bene Dion; Oki Rengga; Indra Jegel; Boris Bokir; Tissa Biani; Indah Permatasari; Arie Kriting; Mamat Alkatiri
- Cinematography: Arfian
- Edited by: Ryan Purwoko
- Music by: Ofel Obaja Setiawan
- Production companies: Imajinari; Jagartha; Agak Laen
- Distributed by: Prathyangira Cinemas (United States)
- Release dates: February 1, 2024 (Indonesia); February 29, 2024 (Malaysia & Brunei Darussalam); March 22, 2024 (United States)
- Running time: 119 minutes
- Country: Indonesia
- Language: Indonesian

Agak Laen (lit. 'A Little Bit Different') is a 2024 Indonesian comedy horror film directed and written by Muhadkly Acho. The film was produced by Dipa Andika and Ernest Prakasa with Imajinari and Jagartha production companies. It starred Bene Dion, Boris Bokir, Oki Rengga, and Indra Jegel as a group of friends who started a haunted house business, and featured Tissa Biani, Indah Permatasari, Arie Kriting, and Mamat Alkatiri.

Agak Laen was released in Indonesian cinemas on February 1, 2024. Agak Laen was a huge commercial success, watched by over 9 million viewers, making it the highest-grossing film of 2024 and became the second highest-grossing Indonesian film of all time, before finally being overtaken by Jumbo on May 10, 2025.

A sequel with an independent storyline, Agak Laen: Menyala Pantiku! was released on November 27, 2025.

== Plot ==
Oki, recently released after serving time for driving under the influence of drugs and hitting a goat, works at a fun fair in Rawa Senggol, West Java, managed by Jongki. After being fired from the Dunk Tank for hitting a customer, he joins his longtime friends Boris, Bene and Jegel in running a haunted house, alongside their friend Marlina. They each need money: Oki to buy medicine and a future grave for his terminally ill mother, Boris to fund his entry into the army, Bene for his wedding to Naomi, and Jegel to repay gambling debts.

The haunted house initially fails to frighten visitors until Oki scares a couple by appearing unexpectedly. Desperate to improve the attraction, he uses his mother's certificate to fund renovations. On its reopening, a man named Basuki enters while hiding from his wife, Retno, because he is dating Intan. He suffers a fatal heart attack from the jumpscares. Fearing the consequences, Oki, Boris, Bene and Jegel bury his body and conceal the grave with a prop before Intan arrives.

After a brief closure, the haunted house reopens, but objects begin moving on their own. When two TikTokers film a vlog there, Basuki's spirit appears to activate effects that were never installed, frightening everyone. Jegel is left hanging from the ceiling in a pocong costume. Meanwhile, Retno reports Basuki missing to Chief Tohar, whose police station is being relocated. The TikTok video goes viral, bringing more visitors. Jegel must urinate on Basuki's burial site whenever his spirit is needed for the attraction. The haunted house becomes successful, allowing the four friends to repay their debts and recover Oki's mother's certificate.

They then learn from the television that Basuki was a legislative candidate for the "Bergerigi" Party. Intan also spots Basuki's cap in the TikTok video, which Marlina had placed there. When police arrive at the fun fair, Tohar notices Jegel's urine but accepts the explanation and leaves after paying the group. Intan then confronts the four, accusing them of "murdering" Basuki. Boris gives her some of their savings and tells her to flee and remain silent. Obet, a mute janitor who saw Basuki at the fun fair on his final night, overhears them.

Obet's fear arouses suspicion, and he tries to contact Tohar through Jongki. When Oki, Boris, Bene and Jegel later attempt to help Obet clean the fair, he mistakenly believes they intend to kill him and flees. He falls from a Ferris wheel and is hospitalised, leaving him unable to communicate because both arms are broken. Meanwhile, Intan is traced by the police.

The four decide to move Basuki's body. Jegel proposes hiding it in Oki's mother's future grave; Oki initially resists and tries to drown him in a kiddie pool, but they eventually exhume the body. While they work, the haunted house opens and two visitors fall into the empty grave without seeing the body. Tohar meanwhile obtains clues about Basuki from Intan. The four transport the body to the cemetery under the pretence that a prop needs repairing, while police search the haunted house. The police discover a map revealing their plan, and near the cemetery the friends frighten away Beben, Tohar's acquaintance, using ghost costumes.

After burying Basuki in Oki's mother's intended grave, Oki learns from his younger sister that their mother has died. He realises that they have thwarted her wish for her grave to be beside his father's. Refusing to abandon one another, the four are arrested for causing Basuki's accidental death.

Two years and four months later, they are released. Oki reunites with his younger sister, Boris with his mother, while Bene is disappointed when Naomi fails to appear. At the cemetery, Bene finally meets Naomi, who remains unmarried, and proposes. She replies that her father requires at least 3,000 guests at the wedding, causing Bene to faint as his friends attempt to carry him.

== Cast ==
- Bene Dion as Bene
- Oki Rengga as Oki
- Indra Jegel as Jegel
- Boris Bokir as Boris
- Tissa Biani as Marlina
- Indah Permatasari as Intan
- Arie Kriting as Jongki
- Mamat Alkatiri as Beben
- Sadana Agung Sulistya as Obet
- Bukie B. Mansyur as Officer Tohar Wahyudi
- Arief Didu as Basuki Munandar
- Rita Matu Mona as Berlian Siagian
- Anggi Marito as Naomi
- Praz Teguh as Bedul
- Soleh Solihun as Army officer

Cameo

- Ernest Prakasa as sign language expert
- Aci Resti, Ardit Erwandha, Denny Gitong, Dicky Mangoy, Kristo Immanuel, and Nopek Novian as visitors of the haunted house
- Anastasia Herzigova as News anchor
- Rais Marasabessy as Thug

== Production ==
=== Background ===
The project originated from YouTube podcast titled Agak Laen, hosted by Boris Bokir, Indra Jegel, Oki Rengga, and Bene Dion. The program was later adapted into a feature film by Imajinari Pictures, a production company owned by Ernest Prakasa. The negotiation process began during one podcast episode featuring Ernest as a guest, in which the four hosts attempted to realize their plan to make a film by persuading him that their story would achieve significant commercial success if adapted for the screen, including the promise of reaching one million viewers. Ernest ultimately agreed to develop the film.

Agak Laen is the third film produced by Imajinari, following Missing Home (2022) and Falling in Love Like in Movies (2023). It is also regarded as the first feature-length film to be adapted from a podcast originally based on an audio conversation. The project marked Imajinari’s first collaboration involving external intellectual property. Producers Ernest Prakasa and Dipa Andika stated that their confidence in producing the film was rooted in their belief in the strong chemistry among the four lead performers, which Dipa described as a crucial element in film production. Ernest also requested that the members of Agak Laen contribute as executive producers and invest in the film. According to Ernest, Agak Laen was the most expensive production undertaken by Imajinari compared to its previous films.

For the director, Ernest and Bene were initially planned to serve as directors. However, Ernest declined, citing ongoing projects that prevented him from taking on a directorial role, while Bene agreed only to act and was unwilling to direct. Imajinari subsequently decided to seek another candidate and ultimately appointed Muhadkly Acho as director as well as screenwriter, based on his track record in the film Gara-Gara Warisan and the series Induk Gajah.

=== Screenwriting ===
Agak Laen adopts the horror-comedy genre, with a premise centered on a haunted house attraction. The members of Agak Laen had previously considered several story premises if the film was approved, ultimately developing three potential concepts. These premises were then discussed in greater depth with Ernest, who became interested in the haunted house–themed story. Acho acknowledged that he was not involved until the premise had been selected. He accepted the premise after being chosen as screenwriter and tasked with developing the initial idea further. The development of the story and character design took approximately two months. Once the script was completed, the cast proceeded to the script reading stage.

Acho stated that Agak Laen is relatively unique in terms of its screenwriting process. Unlike the films he had previously written, the characters in this film were already well defined from the outset, as the principal cast members possessed distinctive, established personas. As a result, his task primarily involved integrating these preexisting character traits into the screenplay. In writing the script, Acho drew extensively on narrative patterns that frequently emerge in the Agak Laen podcast.

=== Characterization ===
Agak Laen adopts a character concept similar to that used by Warkop DKI in their films. The four performers portray characters bearing their real names. This approach was previously employed by the comedy group Warkop DKI during its dominance of Indonesian cinema, in which Dono, Kasino, and Indro consistently played themselves, even though their characters were adapted to suit the narrative of each film. Ernest stated that this concept had to be applied because Agak Laen sudah was already well known as a podcast and each member possessed a strong, recognizable persona, making it impractical to change the characters’ names in the film. However, the characterization of the four members of Agak Laen may evolve if the story continues.

=== Filming ===
Prior to principal photography, the production team undertook approximately five months of preparation, while the cast participated in script readings for three weeks. Filming took place over 18 days in September 2023. With a night market serving as the primary setting, the production constructed the night market set from scratch on an open field in Depok, Jawa Barat. Accordingly, the shooting schedule ran from afternoon until morning to accommodate the night market backdrop.

== Music ==
Agak Laen features a theme song of the same title, popularized by the four members of Agak Laen. The song "Agak Laen" was released in 2021, with lyrics written by the group’s members.

=== Soundtrack ===
Title	Singer	Producer	Production
"Agak Laen"	Bene Dion, Boris Bokir, Indra Jegel, Oki Rengga		

== Release ==
=== Theatrical ===
Agak Laen was released in Indonesian cinemas on 1 February 2024 with a 13+ age classification. The film was deliberately scheduled for release 14 days prior to the 2024 Indonesian presidential election, with the intention of easing public tension ahead of the vote. Agak Laen officially concluded its theatrical run after 98 days in cinemas. To mark the end of its exhibition, a special group screening event was held at XXI Epicentrum, Kuningan, South Jakarta, on 26 May 2024.

Agak Laen was also screened in overseas cinemas. On 7 March 2024, the film premiered in Malaysia and Brunei Darussalam, followed by its release in Singapore on 14 March 2024. Antenna Entertainment, acting as the distributor for the Southeast Asian region, subsequently sought to expand its distribution network through its partners by releasing the film in the United States. Agak Laen opened in 13 cinemas across the United States on 22 March 2024, making it the first Indonesian film to be released in the United States that year.

=== Video on Demand ===
Agak Laen became available on the Netflix on 31 May 2024.

== Reception ==
=== Box office ===
Since its theatrical release in Indonesia on 1 February 2024, the film attracted 1,000,000 viewers within its first four days of screening. Within one week, total attendance reached 2,000,000. On the 10th day of broadcast, this film received 3,000,000 viewers with the highest number of daily viewers reaching more than 500,000 people.

On 16 February 2024, Agak Laen entered the top ten highest-grossing Indonesian films of all time, surpassing Pengabdi Setan, Habibie & Ainun, Laskar Pelangi, and Sewu Dino after reaching 5,000,000 viewers. After 24 days of exhibition, on 24 February 2024, the film exceeded 7,000,000 viewers and became the highest-grossing Indonesian comedy film, overtaking Warkop DKI Reborn: Jangkrik Boss! Part 1 which had recorded 6,858,616 viewers. This achievement also positioned Agak Laen as the second highest-grossing Indonesian film of all time, behind KKN di Desa Penari which recorded 10,061,033 viewers. After 98 days in cinemas, Agak Laen accumulated a total of 9,125,188 viewers. In recognition of this achievement, the film received a special award for “Comedy Film with the Highest Audience Attendance” at the 2024 Anugerah Komedi Indonesia.

=== Awards ===
Year	Awards	Category	Receipient	Result	Ref.
2024	Anugerah Komedi Indonesia	Special Award for Most Viewed Comedy Film	Agak Laen	Nominated	
2024	Indonesian Movie Actors Awards	Favorite Film	Agak Laen	Nominated	
2024	Indonesian Film Festival	Best-Selling Films (Piala Antemas)	Agak Laen	Nominated	
2024	Bandung Film Festival	Praised Screenwriter of Indonesian Films	Muhadkly Acho	Nominated	

== Sequel ==
Ernest Prakasa announced plans to produce a sequel on the same day Agak Laen concluded its theatrical run. He confirmed that Agak Laen 2 would present a new story rather than serve as a direct continuation of the first film. Oki Rengga revealed that the sequel already has a projected timeline and is expected to enter production in 2025. He also stated that Agak Laen 2 would not be rushed to maintain the film’s quality.

Baruson E&A, the film company behind Oscar-winning Parasite, planned to adapt the film in Korean.
