= Student study service (Indonesia) =

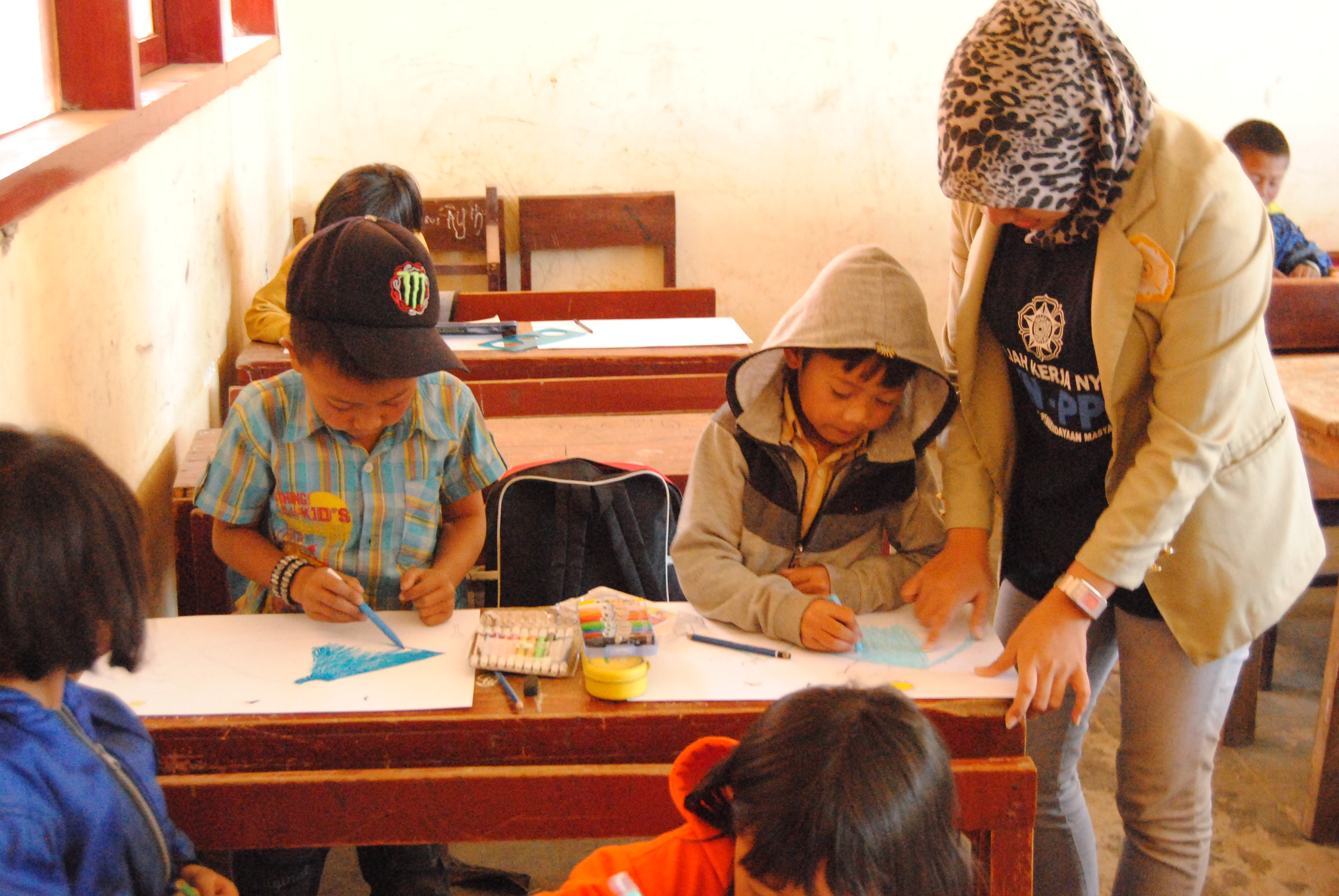
A student from Gadjah Mada University teaching schoolkids as a part of the KKN program

In Indonesia, the Student Study Service (Indonesian: Kuliah Kerja Nyata, lit. 'Real-work Study', abbreviated as KKN) is a concept of linking academic study with the practical experience of community service on service-learning approach. Since 1973, KKN has been integrated into the higher education curriculum for Indonesian universities, and it became one of Indonesian higher education's Tridharma, or threefold responsibilities, besides teaching and conducting researches. Through the KKN program, the students are expected to share their knowledge and help local people to improve their lives and motivate them toward self-development.

For example, in Gadjah Mada University, students are assigned to go to rural areas for approximately 7 to 8 weeks and develop programs that are able to enhance the areas from four aspects: health, science and engineering, agriculture, as well as humanities.
