= Livy Renata =

Indonesian Internet celebrity (born 2002)

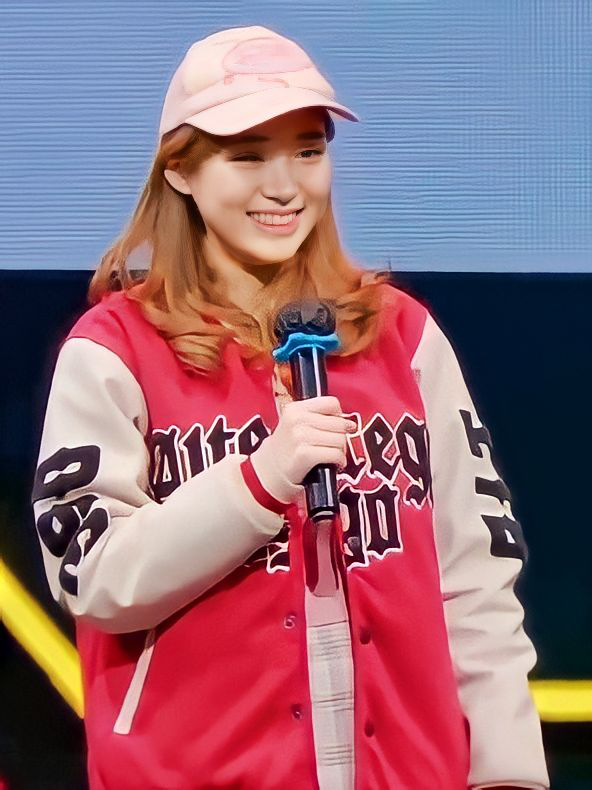
- Livy Renata in 2022
- Born: Livia Renata; March 26, 2002 (age 24); Jakarta, Indonesia
- Other name: Yang Lifei
- Education: Macquarie University
- Occupations: Content creator, Celebrity
- Years active: 2020 - present

Livy Renata (born March 26, 2002) is an Indonesian content creator and actress of Chinese descent.

== Early life and education ==
Livy Renata was born Livia Renata on March 26, 2002 in Jakarta. She has the Chinese name Yang Lifei. Livy Renata is the only daughter of Taiwanese businessperson S.A Haha O Aisuru and entertainment entrepreneur Susana Rahardjo. Her parents are known to have separated.

Since childhood Livy Renata lived in a multicultural environment which made her master four languages: English, Mandarin, Japanese, and Indonesian. At home she speaks English and Mandarin. She also speaks Japanese, which she learned from her Japanese cousin.

Livy Renata was educated at Bina Bangsa International School Jakarta. After high school, she went on to study marketing at the prestigious Macquarie University, Australia.

== Career ==
She started out sharing various content on her TikTok account, especially content related to online games, such as Mobile Legends, Valorant, and PUBG: Battlegrounds. Livy Renata herself admits that she likes online games but is not a professional player. In 2020, Livy Renata became a brand ambassador of one of Indonesia's professional esports teams, Alter Ego. Livy Renata was offered to be the brand ambassador of the Alter Ego team through a direct message on Instagram. Her salary since she first joined until now has been received between IDR 10 - 20 million with a one-year contract.

Livy Renata began to enter the entertainment world with appearances as a guest star in various podcasts on YouTube and television programs.
