= Love Unlike in K-Dramas =

2024 romantic drama film

- Theatrical release poster
- Directed by: Meira Anastasia
- Screenplay by: Meira Anastasia
- Produced by: Ernest Prakasa; Dipa Andika
- Starring: Lutesha; Ganindra Bimo; Jerome Kurnia
- Cinematography: Arfian
- Edited by: Ryan Purwoko
- Music by: Ofel Obaja Setiawan
- Production company: Imajinari Pictures
- Release date: 1 December 2024 (Jogja)
- Running time: 120 minutes
- Country: Indonesia

Love Unlike in K-Dramas (Indonesian: Cinta Tak Seindah Drama Korea) is a 2024 romantic drama film directed and written by Meira Anastasia in her directorial debut. The film stars Lutesha, Ganindra Bimo, and Jerome Kurnia.

The film had its world premiere at the 19th Jogja-NETPAC Asian Film Festival on 1 December 2024, and it was theatrically released in Indonesia on 5 December 2024.

== Premise ==
A woman receives a sweet surprise from her boyfriend and goes on vacation to Seoul, South Korea, with her two best friends, who are also avid Korean drama fans. Unexpectedly, she encounters her first love from high school.

== Cast ==
- Lutesha as Dhea
- Ganindra Bimo as Bimo
- Jerome Kurnia as Julian
- Dea Panendra as Kikan
- Anya Geraldine as Tara
- Seong Byeong-suk as Julian's adoptive mother
- Gary M. Iskak as Julian's father

== Production ==
N Seoul Tower, one of the film's shooting locations

In February 2024, Imajinari Pictures announced the project to be directed by Meira Anastasia in her directorial debut. She had previously served as a co-director on her husband Ernest Prakasa's films, including Milly & Mamet: Ini Bukan Cinta & Rangga (2018) and Imperfect (2019). In April 2024, the cast was announced and Lutesha, Ganindra Bimo, and Jerome Kurnia set to star in the leading roles. Principal photography began in March 2024 in Seoul, South Korea, and Jakarta, Indonesia and was completed one month later. Shooting locations included N Seoul Tower, Anguk station, among others.

== Release ==
Love Unlike in K-Dramas had its world premiere at the 19th Jogja-NETPAC Asian Film Festival on 1 December 2024, competing for Indonesian Screen Awards. The film was released in Indonesian theatres four days later, on 5 December 2024.
