= Dancing Village: The Curse Begins =

2024 horror film

- Theatrical release poster
- Directed by: Kimo Stamboel
- Screenplay by: Lele Laila
- Based on: KKN di Desa Penari by SimpleMan
- Produced by: Manoj Punjabi
- Starring: Aulia Sarah; Maudy Effrosina; Jourdy Pranata
- Cinematography: Patrick Tashadian
- Edited by: Fachrun Daud
- Music by: Ricky Lionardi
- Production company: MD Pictures
- Distributed by: MD Entertainment
- Release date: April 11, 2024
- Running time: 122 minutes
- Country: Indonesia
- Languages: Indonesian; Javanese
- Budget: $1.8 million
- Box office: $10.6 million

Dancing Village: The Curse Begins (Indonesian: Badarawuhi di Desa Penari lit. Badarawuhi in the Dancer's Village) is a 2024 Indonesian supernatural horror film. It is an adaptation of the novel KKN di Desa Penari by SimpleMan. This film was produced by MD Pictures and stars Aulia Sarah, Maudy Effrosina, and Jourdy Pranata. It is a prequel to the 2022 movie KKN di Desa Penari, that follows the story of Badarawuhi, a mysterious dancer who chooses female dancers as sacrifice in the first film.

The Curse Begins was released in Indonesian cinemas on 11 April 2024, in competition with Grave Torture. The film also premiered on Trans7 on 31 December 2025.

== Cast ==
- Aulia Sarah as Badarawuhi
- Maudy Effrosina as Mila
- Jourdy Pranata as Yuda
- Moh. Iqbal Sulaiman as Jito
- Ardit Erwandha as Arya
- Claresta Taufan Kusumarina as Ratih
- Diding Boneng as Mbah Buyut
  - Aming as young Mbah Buyut
- Dinda Kanyadewi as Jiyanti: Ratih's mother
  - Baiq Nathania Elvaretta Sagita as young Jiyanti
- Pipien Putri as Mbah Putri
- Maryam Supraba as Inggri: Mila's mother
  - Princeza Leticia as young Inggri
- Bima Sena as Prabu
- Putri Permata as Sundari
- Baiq Vania Estiningtyas Sagita as Santika

== Reception ==
Endro Priherdityo of CNN Indonesia gave the film a rating of 2/5 stars. He criticized the acting and story, calling it boring and a rehash of the original film, though he praised the technical aspects. He said of the film's script: "Lele seems to rather modify the script for KKN di Desa Penari, changing the names of the characters and their backgrounds, inserting elements from the '80s decade, and a mother-child story that is – frankly – out of date."

== See also ==
- Indonesian horror
