= Ernest Prakasa =

Indonesian comedian and actor (born 1982)

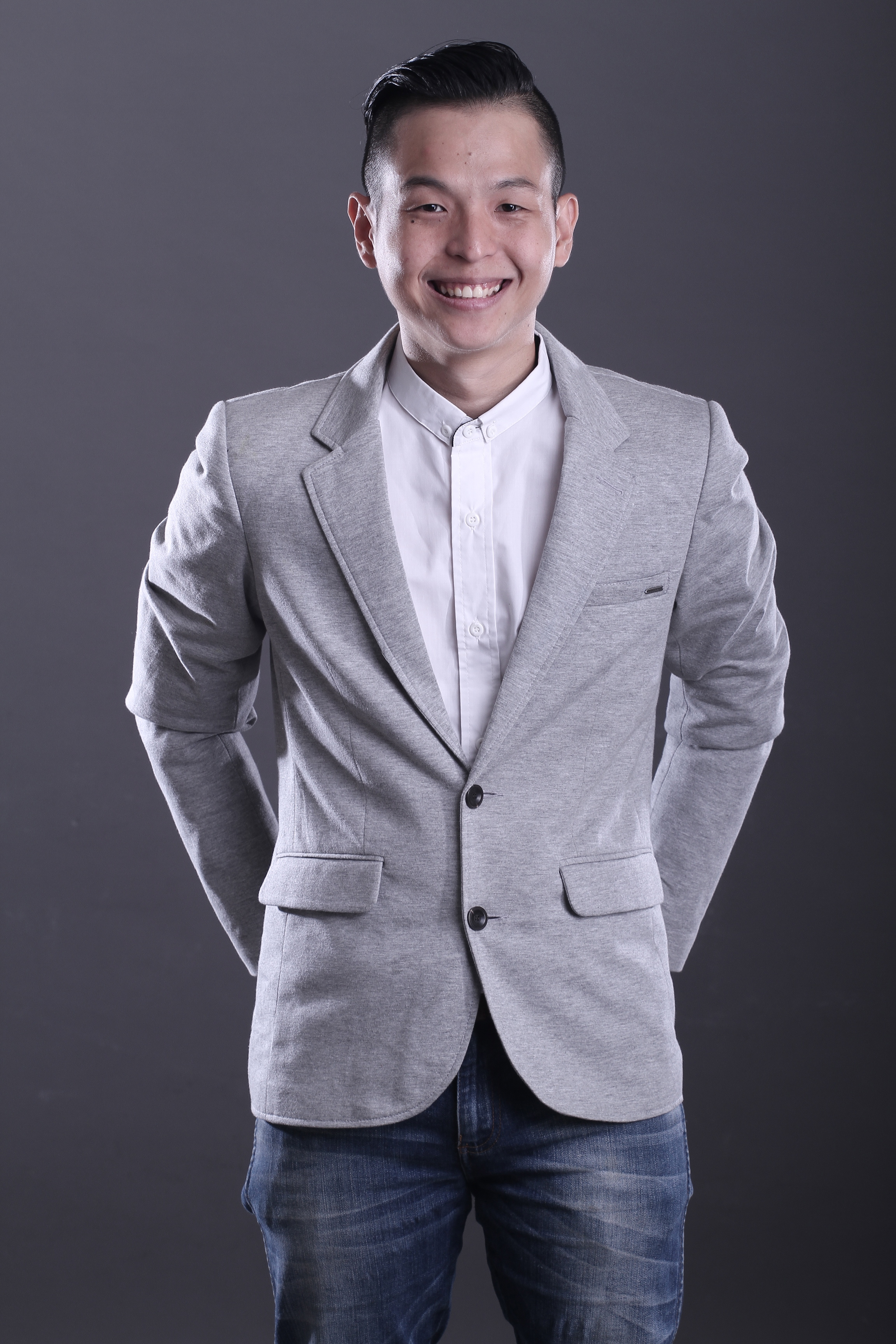
- Born: Ernest Prakasa; 29 January 1982 (age 44); Jakarta, Indonesia
- Occupations: comedian; writer; actor
- Years active: 2011–present (standup comedian) 2011–2013 (President/ Chief of Stand Up Indo)
- Spouse: Meira Anastasia (2008–present)
- Children: Sky Tierra Solana (2009); Snow Auror Arashi (2014)
- Website: Ernest Prakasa

Ernest Prakasa (born 29 January 1982) is an Indonesian comedian, stand up performer, writer, and actor. He became popular after receiving third place in Stand Up Comedy Indonesia (SUCI) in 2011. He is known as a Chinese-Indonesian comedian who often uses his ethnic background as a standup comedy subject. Ernest obtained his degree from Padjadjaran University, majoring in International Relations.

== Television ==
- Stand Up Comedy Show (Metro TV)
- Stand Up Comedy Indonesia (Kompas TV) as contestant on 2011, host on 2014
- Comic Action (Kompas TV)
- Indonesia Harus Buka (Kompas TV)
- Stand Up Comedy Academy (Indosiar) as judge on 2015

== Filmography ==
- Make Money (2013)
- Comic 8 (2014)
- Kukejar Cinta ke Negeri Cina (2014)
- CJR The Movie (2015)
- Comic 8: Casino Kings (2015)
- Ngenest The Movie (2015)
- Sundul Gan: The Story of Kaskus (2016)
- Jagoan Instan (2016)
- Koala Kumal (2016)
- Rudy Habibie (2016)
- Cek Toko Sebelah (2016)
- Filosofi Kopi 2 (2017)
- Stip & Pensil (2017)
- Susah Sinyal (2017)
- Sesuai Aplikasi (2018)
- Milly & Mamet: Ini Bukan Cinta & Rangga (2018)
- Imperfect (2019)
- Cek Toko Sebelah 2 (2022)
- Falling In Love Like In Movies (2023) (as producer)
- Agak Laen (2024) (as producer)
- Love Unlike in K-Dramas (2024) (as producer)
- Kaka Boss (2024) (as producer)
- Lost in the Spotlight (2025)

== Series ==
- Cek Toko Sebelah The Series (2019)
- Cek Toko Sebelah The Series 2 (2020)
- Imperfect The Series (2021)

== Works ==
- Prakasa, Ernest (2012). Dari Merem ke Melek: Catatan Seorang Komedian. Kepustakaan Populer Gramedia. ISBN 978-979-9104-98-4.
- Prakasa, Ernest (2013). Ngenest – Ngetawain Hidup Ala Ernest. Rakbuku. –.
- Ernest Prakasa & The Oriental Bandits (2013) (DVD)
- Illucinati (2014) (DVD)
- XL 2econd Chance (2014–2015) (Youtube miniseries)
- *Prakasa, Ernest (2014). Ngenest 2 – Ngetawain Hidup Ala Ernest. Rakbuku. –.
- Prakasa, Ernest (2015). Ngenest 3 – Ngetawain Hidup Ala Ernest.

== Accolades ==
Year	Work	Award	Category	Result
2016	Ngenest	Indonesia Box Office Movie Awards 2016	Best Male Actor	Nominated
2016	Ngenest	Indonesia Box Office Movie Awards 2016	Best Director	Nominated
2016	Ngenest	Indonesia Box Office Movie Awards 2016	Best Scenario Writer	Won
