= 2020 Indonesian Film Festival =

2020 Indonesian film awards

40th Indonesian Film Festival
- Date: 5 December 2020
- Site: Assembly Hall, Jakarta Convention Center; Jakarta, Indonesia
- Hosted by: Chicco Jerikho; Laura Basuki; Reza Rahadian; Tissa Biani

Highlights
- Best Picture: Impetigore
- Most awards: Impetigore (6)
- Most nominations: Impetigore (17)

Television coverage
- Network: TVRI; RCTI+; Vidio; Goplay

The 40th Citra Awards, presented by the Indonesian Film Board and Ministry of Education, Culture, Research, and Technology, honored the achievement in Indonesian cinema released from 1 October 2019 to 15 March 2020 screened at the theatres or direct to streaming platforms. The ceremony was held on 5 December 2020 at the Assembly Hall, Jakarta Convention Center, Jakarta, Indonesia, and presented by actors Chicco Jerikho, Laura Basuki, Reza Rahadian and Tissa Biani.

Horror film Impetigore received a record of 17 nominations, besting the previous record of 14 set by Marlina the Murderer in Four Acts in 2018. The film won six awards, including Best Picture. Other winners included Abracadabra with three, The Queen of Black Magic with two, Golden Frames in the Closet, Homecoming, Humba Dreams, Imperfect, Mother Earth, One Day We'll Talk About Today, Prognosis, The Science of Fictions, Susi Susanti: Love All, You and I with one.

== Winners and nominees ==
The nominations were announced on 7 November 2020. Horror film Impetigore led the nominations with seventeen, followed by biographical drama film Susi Susanti: Love All with thirteen and drama film Imperfect with eleven.

Winners are listed first, highlighted in boldface, and indicated with a double dagger (‡).

**Best Picture**: **Impetigore – Shanty Hermayn, Tia Hasibuan, Auora Lovenson and Ben Soebiakto, producers**‡; Homecoming – Perlita Desiani, producer; Humba Dreams – Mira Lesmana, producer; Imperfect – Chand Parwez Servia and Fiaz Servia, producers; The Science of Fictions – Yosep Anggi Noen, Yulia Evina Bhara, Edwin Nazir and Arya Sweta, producers; Susi Susanti: Love All – Daniel Mananta, Reza Hidayat and Guillaume Catala, producers	**Best Director**: **Joko Anwar – Impetigore**‡; Faozan Rizal – Abracadabra; Riri Riza – Humba Dreams; Sim F – Susi Susanti: Love All; Yosep Anggi Noen – The Science of Fictions
**Best Actor**: **Gunawan Maryanto – The Science of Fictions as Siman**‡; Alqusyairi Radjamuda – Mountain Song as Gimba; Ario Bayu – Impetigore as Ki Saptadi; Dion Wiyoko – Susi Susanti: Love All as Alan Budikusuma; Ibnu Jamil – Homecoming as Firman; Reza Rahadian – Abracadabra as Lukman; Reza Rahadian – Imperfect as Dika	**Best Actress**: **Laura Basuki – Susi Susanti: Love All as Susi Susanti**‡; Faradina Mufti – Crazy Awesome Teachers as Miss Rahayu; Jessica Mila – Imperfect as Rara; Putri Ayudya – Homecoming as Aida; Tara Basro – Impetigore as Maya; Ully Triani – Humba Dreams as Ana
**Best Supporting Actor**: **Ade Firman Hakim – The Queen of Black Magic as Maman**‡ (posthumous award); Butet Kertaradjasa – Abracadabra as Head of Police; Iszur Muchtar – Susi Susanti: Love All as Risad Haditono; Kiki Narendra – Impetigore as Bambang; Totos Rasiti – Mecca I'm Coming as Soleh; Yoga Pratama – Homecoming as Agus; Yudi Ahmad Tajudin – The Science of Fictions as Ndapuk/Tupon	**Best Supporting Actress**: **Christine Hakim – Impetigore as Nyi Misni**‡; Asmara Abigail – Homecoming as Santi; Asri Welas – Crazy Awesome Teachers as Miss Indah; Dewi Irawan – Imperfect as Ratih; Marissa Anita – Impetigore as Dini; Ratna Riantiarno – Love for Sale 2 as Ros; Ria Irawan – Mecca I'm Coming as Miss Ramah (posthumous nomination)
**Best Original Screenplay**: **Homecoming – Adriyanto Dewo**‡; Humba Dreams – Riri Riza; Impetigore – Joko Anwar; Mountain Song – Yusuf Radjamuda; The Science of Fictions – Yosep Anggi Noen; Susi Susanti: Love All – Syarika Bralini, Raditya, Daud Sumolang, Sinar Ayu Massie and Raymond Lee	**Best Adapted Screenplay**: **Imperfect – Ernest Prakasa and Meira Anastasia**‡; The Queen of Black Magic – Joko Anwar
**Best Cinematography**: **Impetigore – Ical Tanjung**‡; Abracadabra – Gandang Warah; Homecoming – Vera Lestafa; Humba Dreams – Bayu Prihantoro; Mountain Song – Ujel Bausad; Susi Susanti: Love All – Yunus Pasolang	**Best Editing**: **Impetigore – Dinda Amanda**‡; Homecoming – Arifin Cu'unk; Imperfect – Ryan Purwoko; Mecca I'm Coming – Ahyat Andrianto; The Queen of Black Magic – Arifin Cu'unk; The Science of Fictions – Ahmad Fesdi Anggoro and Yosep Anggi Noen
**Best Sound**: **Impetigore – Mohamad Ikhsan, Syamsurrijal and Anhar Moha**‡; Abracadabra – Khrisna Purna Ratmara and Dicky Permana; Imperfect – Syamsurrijal and Anhar Moha; Mangkujiwo – Mohamad Ikhsan, Trisno and Syamsurrijal; May the Devil Take You Too – Arief Budi Santoso and Hiro Ishizaka; The Science of Fictions – Hadrianus Eko Sunu, Firman Satyanegara, L.H. Aim Adi Negara, Bagas Oktariyan Ananta and Yasuhiro Morinaga; Susi Susanti: Love All – Mohamad Ikhsan, Adhitya Indra and Trisno	**Best Visual Effects**: **The Queen of Black Magic – Gaga Nugraha**‡; Abracadabra – Amrin Nugraha; Habibie & Ainun 3 – X. Jo; Impetigore – Abby Eldipie; Mangkujiwo – Kotak Ide; May the Devil Take You Too – Setyo Anggono, Lucas Ahityo and Kholish Abdulhaq; Susi Susanti: Love All – Satriya Mahardhika, Wahyu Ponco, Ardian Krisna Wijaya and Stephen Kingsyah
**Best Original Score**: **Humba Dreams – Aksan Sjuman**‡; Homecoming – Lie Indra Perkasa; Imperfect – Ifa Fachir and Dimas Wibisana; Impetigore – Aghi Narottama, Bemby Gusti, Tony Merle and Mian Tiara; One Day We'll Talk About Today – Ofel Obaja; Susi Susanti: Love All – Aghi Narottama and Bemby Gusti	**Best Original Song**: **"Fine Today" from One Day We'll Talk About Today – Music, Lyrics and Performed by Ardhito Pramono**‡; "Dari Kata Turun ke Hati" from The Ex-Lover Shop – Music by Andi Rianto; Lyrics by Titien Wattimena; Performed by Dea Panendra; "Pujaan Hati" from Impetigore – Music and Performed by The Spouse; Lyrics by Tia Hasibuan; "Tak Harus Sempurna" from Imperfect – Music by Ifa Fachir; Lyrics by Ifa Fachir and Reza Rahadian; Performed by Reza Rahadian
**Best Art Direction**: **Abracadabra – Vida Sylvia Pasaribu**‡; Impetigore – Frans X.R. Paat; The Science of Fictions – Deki Yudhanto; Susi Susanti: Love All – Frans X.R. Paat	**Best Costume Design**: **Abracadabra – Hagai Pakan**‡; Bloodlust Beauty – Aldi Harra; Crazy Awesome Teachers – Jeanne Elizabeth Fam; Imperfect – Andhika Dharmapermana; Impetigore – Isabelle Patrice; The Science of Fictions – Irmina Kristini; Susi Susanti: Love All – Nuni Triani
**Best Makeup**: **Abracadabra – Eba Sheba**‡; Habibie & Ainun 3 – Aktris Handradjasa and Teguh Widodo; Imperfect – Talia Subandrio; Impetigore – Darwyn Tse; The Queen of Black Magic – Ucok Albasirun; The Science of Fictions – Anismcaw; Susi Susanti: Love All – Eba Sheba	**Best Live Action Short Film**: **Golden Frames in the Closet – Putri Sarah Amelia**‡; Fitrah – Yulinda Dwi Andriyani; Hey Guys It's Me Again God! – Winner Wijaya; Into the Happiness – Imam Syafi'i; Lantun Rakyat – Dwi Cahya
**Best Documentary Feature**: **You and I – Fanny Chotimah**‡; Between the Devil and the Deep Blue Sea – D.S. Nugraheni	**Best Documentary Short Film**: **Ibu Bumi – Chairun Nissa**‡; Cerita Tentang Sinema di Sudut yang Lain – Hariwi; Cipto Rupo – Catur Panggih Raharjo; Dulhaji Dolena – Anita Reza Zein; The Other Half – Wahyu Utami
**Best Animated Short Film**: **Prognosis – Ryan Adriandhy**‡; Handcrafted – Angelia; Kasat Mata – Sari Pololessy; Nussa Bundaku – Chrisnawan "Cicis" Martantio	**Lifetime Achievement Award**: **Tatiek Maliyati**

=== Films with multiple nominations and awards ===
Films that received multiple nominations
Nominations	Film
17	Impetigore
13	Susi Susanti: Love All
11	Imperfect
10	The Science of Fictions
9	Abracadabra
9	Homecoming
6	Humba Dreams
5	The Queen of Black Magic
3	Crazy Awesome Teachers
3	Mecca I'm Coming
3	Mountain Song
2	Habibie & Ainun 3
2	Mangkujiwo
2	May the Devil Take You Too
2	One Day We'll Talk About Today

Films that received multiple awards
Awards	Film
6	Impetigore
3	Abracadabra
2	The Queen of Black Magic
