= 2019 Maya Awards (Indonesia) =

2019 Indonesian film awards

8th Maya Awards
- Awarded for: The achievement in Indonesian cinema
- Presented on: 8 February 2020
- Site: Grandkemang Hotel, South Jakarta, Indonesia

Highlights
- Best Picture: Two Blue Stripes
- Most awards: Two Blue Stripes (4)
- Most nominations: This Earth of Mankind (14)

The 8th Maya Awards took place on 8 February 2020 at the Grandkemang Hotel, South Jakarta, Indonesia, to honor the achievement in Indonesian cinema released in 2019.

Teen drama film Two Blue Stripes received the most awards with four, including Best Feature Film. Other winners included Glorious Days and Gundala with three, 27 Steps of May, Imperfect and Memories of My Body with two.

== Winners and nominees ==
The nominations were announced on 22 January 2020 on the award's social media. Historical romance film This Earth of Mankind led the nominations with fourteen, followed by coming-of-age drama film Memories of My Body with thirteen and family drama film One Day We'll Talk About Today with twelve.

=== Awards ===
Winners are listed first, highlighted in boldface, and indicated with a double dagger (‡).

| **Best Feature Film**: **Two Blue Stripes – Chand Parwez Servia and Fiaz Servia**‡; 27 Steps of May – Wilza Lubis, Rayya Makarim, and Ravi Bharwani; Glorious Days – Mira Lesmana; Imperfect – Chand Parwez Servia and Fiaz Servia; Impetigore – Shanty Harmaryn, Tia Hasibuan, Aoura L. Chandra, and Ben Soebiakto; Memories of My Body – Ifa Isfansyah; One Day We'll Talk About Today – Anggia Kharisma; This Earth of Mankind – Frederica | **Best Feature Film for Limited Release**: **Humba Dreams – Riri Riza**‡; Daysleeper – Paul Agusta; If This Is My Story – Djenar Maesa Ayu and Kan Lumé |
| **Best Director**: **Garin Nugroho – Memories of My Body**‡; Angga Dwimas Sasongko – One Day We'll Talk About Today; Ernest Prakasa – Imperfect; Hanung Bramantyo – This Earth of Mankind; Joko Anwar – Impetigore; Ravi Bharwani – 27 Steps of May; Riri Riza – Glorious Days | **Iqbal Rais Award for Best Directorial Debut Feature**: **Gina S. Noer – Two Blue Stripes**‡; Bene Dion Rajagukguk – Ghost Writer; Sabrina Rochelle Kalangie – Too Handsome to Handle; Sim F. – Susi Susanti: Love All; Tompi – Pretty Boys |
| **Best Actor in a Leading Role**: **Lukman Sardi – 27 Steps of May as Father**‡; Abimana Aryasatya – Gundala as Sancaka/Gundala; Angga Yunanda – Two Blue Stripes as Bima; Reza Rahadian – Habibie & Ainun 3 as B. J. Habibie; Reza Rahadian – Twivortiare as Beno Wicaksono; Rio Dewanto – One Day We'll Talk About Today as Angkasa | **Best Actress in a Leading Role**: **Raihaanun – 27 Steps of May as May**‡; Adhisty Zara – Two Blue Stripes as Dara; Jessica Mila – Imperfect as Rara; Laura Basuki – Susi Susanti: Love All as Susi Susanti; Raihaanun – Twivortiare as Alexandra Rhea; Sha Ine Febriyanti – This Earth of Mankind as Nyai Ontosoroh |
| **Best Actor in a Supporting Role**: **Baskara Mahendra – Glorious Days as Jojo**‡; Donny Damara – One Day We'll Talk About Today as Narendra; Jefri Nichol – Habibie & Ainun 3 as Ahmad; Randy Pangalila – Memories of My Body as the boxer; Whani Darmawan – Memories of My Body as Warok; Whani Dharmawan – This Earth of Mankind as Darsam | **Best Actress in a Supporting Role**: **Cut Mini – Two Blue Stripes as Yuni**‡; Christine Hakim – Impetigore as Nyi Misni; Dewi Irawan – Imperfect as Ratih; Lulu Tobing – Two Blue Stripes as Rika; Marissa Anita – Impetigore as Dini; Sheila Dara Aisha – One Day We'll Talk About Today as Aurora; Tutie Kirana – The Wedding Shaman as Koes Marjanti; Widyawati – Ambu as Ambu Misnah |
| **Arifin C. Noer Award for Best Brief Memorable Performance**: **Dea Panendra – Glorious Days as Ayu**‡; Asri Welas – Two Blue Stripes as pregnant woman; Pevita Pearce – Gundala as Sri Asih; Sujiwo Tejo – Memories of My Body as lengger teacher; Teuku Rifnu Wikana – Impetigore as Bimo | **Best Young Performer**: **Muzakki Ramdhan – Gundala as little Sancaka**‡; Fatih Unru – Newly Rich as Dodi; Moira Tabina Zayn – Susi Susanti: Love All as teenage Susi; Naura Ayu – DoReMi & You as Putri; Raditya Evandra – Memories of My Body as little Juno |
| **Best Breakthrough Actor**: **Muhammad Khan – Memories of My Body as Juno**‡; Ardhito Pramono – One Day We'll Talk About Today as Kale; Calvin Jeremy – Too Handsome to Handle as Kibo; Jerome Kurnia – This Earth of Mankind as Suurhof; Onadio Leonardo – Pretty Boys as Roni | **Tuti Indra Malaon Award for Best Breakthrough Actress**: **Maizura – Glorious Days as Vina**‡; Carissa Perusset – An Anthology of Feelings as Keara; Danilla Riyadi – Pretty Boys as Asti; Kiky Saputri – Imperfect as Neti; Yasmin Napper – Imperfect as Lulu |
| **Best Original Screenplay**: **Two Blue Stripes – Gina S. Noer**‡; 27 Steps of May – Rayya Makarim; 99 Names of Love – Garin Nugroho; Impetigore – Joko Anwar; Memories of My Body – Garin Nugroho | **Best Adapted Screenplay**: **Imperfect – Ernest Prakasa and Meira Anastasia; based on the novel Imperfect: A Journey to Self-Acceptance by Anastasia**‡; Glorious Days – Mira Lesmana and Gina S. Noer; based on the 2011 film Sunny by Kang Hyeong-cheol; One Day We'll Talk About Today – Jenny Jusuf, Angga Dwimas Sasongko, and Melarissa Sjarief; based on the novel by Marchella FP; This Earth of Mankind – Salman Aristo; based on the novel by Pramoedya Ananta Toer; Twivortiare – Alim Sudio and Benni Setiawan; based on the novel by Ika Natassa |
| **Best Cinematography**: **One Day We'll Talk About Today – Yadi Sugandi**‡; Gundala – Ical Tanjung; Memories of My Body – Teoh Gay Hian; This Earth of Mankind – Ipung Rachmat Syaiful; Two Blue Stripes – Padri Nadeak | **Best Art Direction**: **Impetigore – Frans X. R. Paat**‡; Glorious Days – Eros Eflin; Gundala – Wencislaus de Rozari; Memories of My Body – Ong Hari Wahyu and Edy Wibowo; This Earth of Mankind – Allan Sebastian |
| **Best Editing**: **This Earth of Mankind – Sentot Sahid and Reynaldi Christanto**‡; Glorious Days – W. Ichwandiardono; Impetigore – Dinda Amanda; Memories of My Body – Greg Arya; One Day We'll Talk About Today – Hendra Adhi Susanto; Two Blue Stripes – Aline Jusria | **Best Visual Effects**: **Foxtrot Six – Qartl**‡; Gundala – Abby Eldipie; Habibie & Ainun – x.Jo.; The Queen of Black Magic – Gaga Nugraha; This Earth of Mankind – Raiyan Laksamana |
| **Best Costume Design**: **This Earth of Mankind – Retno Ratih Damayanti**‡; Glorious Days – Chitra Subiyakto and Gemailla Gea Geriantiana; Gundala – Isabelle Patrice; Memories of My Body – Retno Ratih Damayanti; Susi Susanti: Love All – Nuni Triani | **Best Make-Up & Hair**: **Imperfect – Talia Subandrio**‡; Habibie & Ainun 3 – Aktris Handradjasa and Orlando Bassi; My Stupid Boss 2 – Eba Sheba, Sutomo, and Adi Wahono; The Queen of Black Magic – Ucok Albasirun; This Earth of Mankind – Jerry Octavianus |
| **Best Sound**: **Gundala – Khikmawan Santosa, Mohamad Ikhsan, and Anhar Moha**‡; Foxtrot Six – Hiro Ishizaka and Aufa R. Triangga Ariaputra; Impetigore – Mohamad Ikhsan, Syamsurrijal, and Anhar Moha; This Earth of Mankind – Krisna Purna, Khikmawan Santosa, Satrio Budiono, and Wahyu Tri Purnomo; The Queen of Black Magic – M. Ichsan Rachmaditta and Hiro Ishizaka | **Best Score**: **Gundala – Aghi Narottama, Bemby Gusti, and Tony Merle**‡; Glorious Days – Lie Indra Perkasa; Impetigore – Aghi Narottama, Bemby Gusti, and Tony Merle; Memories of My Body – Ramondo Gascaro; This Earth of Mankind – Andhika Triyadi |
| **Best Theme Song**: **"Kembali Ke Awal" from Twivortiare – Written and Performed by Glenn Fredly**‡; "Bebas" from Glorious Days – Written by Iwa K, Yudis Dwikorana, and Toriawan Sudarsono; Performed by Iwa K, Sheryl Sheinafia, Maizura, and Agatha Pricilla; "Bukan Taman Safari" from Hit & Run – Written by Tjahjadi Djajanata and Ishak; Performed by Tatjana Saphira; "Harmoni" from DoReMi & You – Written by Simhala Avadana and Duhita Panchatantra; Performed by Naura Ayu and Devano Danendra; "Kamu dan Kenangan" from Habibie & Ainun 3 – Written by Melly Goeslaw and Anto Hoed; Performed by Maudy Ayunda; "Pelukku Untuk Pelikmu" from Imperfect – Written and Performed by Fiersa Besari; "Secukupnya" from One Day We'll Talk About Today – Written by Baskara Putra and Adhe Arrio; Performed by Hindia; "Untuk Hati yang Terluka" from One Day We'll Talk About Today – Written and Performed by Isyana Sarasvati | **Best Poster Design**: **Love for Sale 2 – Alvin Haris**‡; Gundala – Caravan Studio; One Day We'll Talk About Today – Nady Azhry; The Queen of Black Magic – Caravan Studio; Two Blue Stripes – Endonestuff |
| **Best Short Film**: **Lamun Sumelang – Ludy Oji Prastama**‡; Bura – Eden Junjung; Booking Out – Fuad Hilmi Hirnanda; Gandik – Noprian Rauhul Mahfudz; Maramowe (The Camoro Carver) – Alvin Ramandey; Rahim Puan – Bayu S. Yusi; Sunny Side of the Street – Andrew Kose; Unbaedah – Iqbal Arieffurahman | **Best Music Video**: **"Sikap Duniawi" by Isyana Sarasvati – Jordan Marzuki**‡; "A Long Way" by Eva Celia – Lintang Manik; "Adu Rayu" by Yovie Widianto, Tulus, and Glenn Fredly – Davy Linggar; "Ain't Gonna Give Up" by RAN featuring Ramengvrl – Shadtoto Prasetio; "Memilih Dia" by Bunga Citra Lestari – Katinka Pulungan; "Ready for Love" by Vidi Aldiano, A. Nayaka, and Raline Shah – Ivan Saputra Alam; "Rehat" by Kunto Aji – Kunto Aji and Novanjoh; "You" by Raisa – Gilbert March |
| **Best Animated Short Film**: **Nussa: Bundaku – Chrisnawan Martantio**‡; Kwan – Stevani Willyanto; Orat-Oret – Stella Yohanna; So-Yam! – Radhiatama Chaliq; Utan Rambutan – Andra Fembrianto | **Best Documentary Short Film**: **Minor – Vena Besta Klaudina and Takziyatun Nufus**; 50:50 – Rofie Nur Fauzi; Cipto Rupo – Catur Panggih Raharjo; Isyarat: An Access to Deaf's World – Frisnianda Yuasa Giri; Kepada Bapak di Rumah – Patar Simatupang; Paguruan 4.0 – Abdi Firdaus and Lyanta Laras Putri; Prison: A Short Introduction – Suharditia Trisna Anugerah; The Paintings of War: Aggression in the Eyes of Children – Agustinus Dwi Nugroho |

=== Films with multiple nominations and awards ===
Films that received multiple nominations
| Nominations | Film |
|---|---|
| 14 | This Earth of Mankind |
| 13 | Memories of My Body |
| 12 | One Day We'll Talk About Today |
| 11 | Glorious Days |
| 11 | Two Blue Stripes |
| 10 | Gundala |
| 10 | Impetigore |
| 8 | Imperfect |
| 5 | 27 Steps of May |
| 5 | Habibie & Ainun 3 |
| 4 | The Queen of Black Magic |
| 4 | Susi Susanti: Love All |
| 4 | Twivortiare |
| 3 | Pretty Boys |
| 2 | DoReMi & You |
| 2 | Foxtrot Six |
| 2 | Too Handsome to Handle |

Films that received multiple awards
| Awards | Film |
|---|---|
| 4 | Two Blue Stripes |
| 3 | Glorious Days |
| 3 | Gundala |
| 2 | 27 Steps of May |
| 2 | Imperfect |
| 2 | Memories of My Body |
