= Citra Award for Best Original Screenplay =

Award given annually at the Indonesian Film Festival

- Country: Indonesia
- Presented by: Indonesian Film Festival
- First award: 2006
- Currently held by: Yandy Laurens for Falling In Love Like In Movies (2024)
- Website: festivalfilm.id

The Citra Award for Best Original Screenplay (Indonesian: Piala Citra untuk Penulis Skenario Asli Terbaik) is an award presented annually at the Indonesian Film Festival since 2006. Together with the Citra Award for Best Adapted Screenplay, it replaced the integrated Citra Award for Best Screenplay.

In 2019, Gina S. Noer became the first person to win both Best Original Screenplay and Best Adapted Screenplay in the same year for her work on Cemara's Family and Two Blue Stripes.

== Winners and nominees ==
Winners are listed first in the colored row and denoted by double dagger (‡), followed by the other nominees.

=== 2000s ===
Year	Film	Screenwriter(s)
2006 (26th)	Denias, Senandung Di Atas Awan	Jeremias Nyangoen, Masree Ruliat, Monty Tiwa, and John de Rantau ‡
2006 (26th)	Ekskul	Eka D. Sitorus
2006 (26th)	Garasi	Prima Rusdi
2006 (26th)	Mendadak Dangdut	Monty Tiwa
2006 (26th)	Ruang	Teddy Soeriaatmadja and Adi Nugroho
2007 (27th)	—N/a (Note: The category is integrated into Best Screenplay.)	
2008 (28th)	—N/a	
2009 (29th)	Cin(T)a	Sally Anom Sari and Sammaria Simanjuntak ‡
2009 (29th)	Garuda di Dadaku	Salman Aristo
2009 (29th)	Identitas	Aria Kusumadewa
2009 (29th)	Jagad X Code	Armantono
2009 (29th)	Ruma Maida	Ayu Utami

=== 2010s ===
Year	Film	Screenwriter(s)
2010 (30th)	How Funny (This Country Is)	Musfar Yasin ‡
2010 (30th)	3 Hati Dua Dunia, Satu Cinta	Benni Setiawan
2010 (30th)	7 Hearts 7 Loves 7 Women	Robby Ertanto
2010 (30th)	Hari untuk Amanda	Salman Aristo and Gina S. Noer
2010 (30th)	I Know What You Did on Facebook	Alberthiene Endah and Awi Suryadi
2010 (30th)	Sunday Morning in Victoria Park	Titien Wattimena
2011 (31st)	—N/a (Note: The category is split into Best Screenplay and Best Story.)	
2012 (32nd)	—N/a	
2013 (33rd)	—N/a	
2014 (34th)	Tabula Rasa	Tumpal Tampubolon ‡
2014 (34th)	Before The Morning Repeated	Sinar Ayu Maissy
2014 (34th)	In the Absence of the Sun	Lucky Kuswandi and Ucu Agustin
2014 (34th)	Let's Run	Ninit Yunita
2014 (34th)	Negeri Tanpa Telinga	Indra Tranggono and Lola Amaria
2015 (35th)	Siti	Eddie Cahyono ‡
2015 (35th)	3: Alif Lam Mim	Anggy, Bounty, and Fajar Umbara
2015 (35th)	The Crescent Moon	Salman Aristo, Bagus Bramantyo, and Ismail Basbeth
2015 (35th)	Guru Bangsa: Tjokroaminoto	Ari Syarif and Erik Supit
2015 (35th)	When Will You Get Married?	Monty Tiwa, Robert Ronny, and Ody C. Harahap
2016 (36th)	Aisyah: Biarkan Kami Bersaudara	Jujur Prananto ‡
2016 (36th)	Solo, Solitude	Yosep Anggi Noen
2016 (36th)	Talak 3	Bagus Bramanti
2016 (36th)	Tales of the Otherwords	B.W. Purba Negara
2016 (36th)	There Is Love in High School	Haqi Achmad and Patrick Effendy
2017 (37th)	Check the Store Next Door	Ernest Prakasa ‡
2017 (37th)	Bid'ah Cinta	Nurman Hakim, Zaim Rofiqi, and Ben Sohib
2017 (37th)	Hangout	Raditya Dika
2017 (37th)	Posesif	Gina S. Noer
2017 (37th)	Stip & Pensil	Joko Anwar, Ernest Prakasa, and Bene Dion Rajagukguk
2018 (38th)	Marlina the Murderer in Four Acts	Mouly Surya and Rama Adi ‡
2018 (38th)	Koki-Koki Cilik	Vera Varidia
2018 (38th)	Love for Sale	Andibachtiar Yusuf and M. Irfan Ramli
2018 (38th)	Run to the Beach	Gina S. Noer, Mira Lesmana, Riri Riza, and Arie Kriting
2018 (38th)	The Seen and Unseen	Kamila Andini
2019 (39th)	Two Blue Stripes	Gina S. Noer ‡
2019 (39th)	27 Steps of May	Rayya Makarim
2019 (39th)	Ambu	Titien Wattimena
2019 (39th)	Memories of My Body	Garin Nugroho
2019 (39th)	Newly Rich	Joko Anwar

=== 2020s ===
Year	Film	Screenwriter(s)
2020 (40th)	Homecoming	Adriyanto Dewo ‡
2020 (40th)	Humba Dreams	Riri Riza
2020 (40th)	Mountain Song	Yusuf Radjamuda
2020 (40th)	Impetigore	Joko Anwar
2020 (40th)	The Science of Fictions	Yosep Anggi Noen
2020 (40th)	Susi Susanti: Love All	Syarika Bralini, Raditya, Daud Sumolang, Sinar Ayu Massie, and Raymond Lee
2021 (41st)	Photocopier	Henricus Pria and Wregas Bhanuteja‡
2021 (41st)	Ali & Ratu Ratu Queens	Gina S. Noer
2021 (41st)	Bete's Love	Titien Wattimena and Lina Nurmalina
2021 (41st)	Preman	Randolph Zaini
2021 (41st)	Yuni	Kamila Andini and Prima Rusdi
2022 (42nd)	Autobiography	Makbul Mubarak‡
2022 (42nd)	First, Second & Third Love	Gina S. Noer
2022 (42nd)	Kadet 1947	Rahabi Mandra and Aldo Swastia
2022 (42nd)	Missing Home	Bene Dion Rajagukguk
2022 (42nd)	Stealing Raden Saleh	Husein M. Atmodjo and Angga Dwimas Sasongko
2023 (43rd)	Women from Rote Island	Jeremias Nyangoen‡
2023 (43rd)	Andragogy	Wregas Bhanuteja
2023 (43rd)	The Big 4	Timo Tjahjanto and Johanna Wattimena
2023 (43rd)	Like & Share	Gina S. Noer
2023 (43rd)	Tegar	Alim Sudio and Anggi Frisca
2024 (44th)	Falling In Love Like In Movies	Yandy Laurens‡
2024 (44th)	Agak Laen	Muhadkly Acho
2024 (44th)	Borderless Fog	Ifan Ismail and Edwin
2024 (44th)	Crocodile Tears	Tumpal Tampubolon
2024 (44th)	Grave Torture	Joko Anwar
2025 (45th)	On Your Lap	Reza Rahadian and Felix K. Nesi‡
2025 (45th)	Better Off Dead	Kristo Immanuel and Jessica Tjiu
2025 (45th)	Gowok: Javanese Kamasutra	Hanung Bramantyo and Z.Z. Mulja Galih
2025 (45th)	Jumbo	Ryan Adriandhy and Widya Arifianti
2025 (45th)	The Shadow Strays	Timo Tjahjanto
2025 (45th)	The Siege at Thorn High	Joko Anwar
