= This Earth of Mankind (film) =

2019 historical drama film

- Theatrical release poster
- Indonesian: Bumi Manusia
- Directed by: Hanung Bramantyo
- Screenplay by: Salman Aristo
- Based on: This Earth of Mankind by Pramoedya Ananta Toer
- Produced by: Frederica
- Starring: Iqbaal Ramadhan; Mawar Eva de Jongh; Sha Ine Febriyanti
- Cinematography: Ipung Rachmat Syaiful
- Edited by: Sentot Sahid; Reynaldi Christanto
- Music by: Andhika Triyadi
- Production company: Falcon Pictures
- Release date: 15 August 2019
- Running time: 181 minutes
- Country: Indonesia
- Language: Indonesian
- Budget: Rp30 billion (US$1.9 million)

This Earth of Mankind (Indonesian: Bumi Manusia) is a 2019 Indonesian historical romance drama film, directed by Hanung Bramantyo and written by Salman Aristo. The film was adapted from 1980 novel of the same name by Pramoedya Ananta Toer. It starred Iqbaal Ramadhan, Mawar Eva de Jongh, and Sha Ine Febriyanti.

== Premise ==
This Earth of Mankind tells the story of Minke, a Javanese royal who falls in love with an Indo woman named Annelies, a daughter of Nyai Ontosoroh.

== Cast ==
- Iqbaal Ramadhan as Minke/Tirto Adhi Soerjo
- Mawar Eva de Jongh as Annelies Mellema
- Sha Ine Febriyanti as Ontosoroh/Sanikem
  - Amanda Khairunnisa as young Sanikem
- Giorgino Abraham as Robert Mellema
- Bryan Domani as Jan Dapperste/Panji Darman
- Jerome Kurnia as Robert Suurhof
- Donny Damara as Bupati B, Minke's father
- Ayu Laksmi as Minke's mother
- Dewi Irawan as Mevrouw Telinga
- Chew Kin Wah as Ah Tjong
- Kelly Tandiono as maiko
- Christian Sugiono as Kommers

== Release ==
This Earth of Mankind had its premiere on 9 August 2019 in Surabaya, East Java, along with The Fugitive, another film adapted from Toer's novel of the same name. The film was released theatrically in Indonesia on 15 August 2019. It garnered 1,316,583 spectators during its theatrical run and grossed Rp52.6 million (US$3,355,943).

== Music ==
The song "Ibu Pertiwi" is used as the theme song of this film, arranged by Purwacaraka and performed by Iwan Fals, Once and Fiersa Besari.

== Accolades ==
Award	Date	Category	Recipient	Result	Ref.
Indonesian Film Festival	8 December 2019	Best Picture	Frederica	Nominated	
Indonesian Film Festival	8 December 2019	Best Director	Hanung Bramantyo	Nominated	
Indonesian Film Festival	8 December 2019	Best Actress	Sha Ine Febriyanti	Nominated	
Indonesian Film Festival	8 December 2019	Best Supporting Actor	Jerome Kurnia	Nominated	
Indonesian Film Festival	8 December 2019	Best Supporting Actress	Ayu Laksmi	Nominated	
Indonesian Film Festival	8 December 2019	Best Visual Effects	Raiyan Laksamana	Nominated	
Indonesian Film Festival	8 December 2019	Best Original Score	Andhika Triyadi	Nominated	
Indonesian Film Festival	8 December 2019	Best Sound	Khikmawan Santosa, Satrio Budiono and Krisna Putra	Nominated	
Indonesian Film Festival	8 December 2019	Best Art Direction	Allan Sebastian	Nominated	
Indonesian Film Festival	8 December 2019	Best Makeup	Jerry Octavianus	Nominated	
Indonesian Film Festival	8 December 2019	Best Costume Design	Retno Ratih Damayanti	Nominated	
Indonesian Film Festival	8 December 2019	Best Film Editing	Sentot Sahid and Reynaldi Christanto	Nominated	
Maya Awards	8 February 2020	Best Feature Film	Frederica	Nominated	
Maya Awards	8 February 2020	Best Director	Hanung Bramantyo	Nominated	
Maya Awards	8 February 2020	Best Actress in a Leading Role	Sha Ine Febriyanti	Nominated	
Maya Awards	8 February 2020	Best Actor in a Supporting Role	Whani Dharmawan	Nominated	
Maya Awards	8 February 2020	Best Breakthrough Actor	Jerome Kurnia	Nominated	
Maya Awards	8 February 2020	Best Adapted Screenplay	Salman Aristo	Nominated	
Maya Awards	8 February 2020	Best Cinematography	Ipung Rachmat Syaiful	Nominated	
Maya Awards	8 February 2020	Best Art Direction	Allan Sebastian	Nominated	
Maya Awards	8 February 2020	Best Editing	Sentot Sahid and Reynaldi Christanto	Won	
Maya Awards	8 February 2020	Best Visual Effects	Raiyan Laksamana	Nominated	
Maya Awards	8 February 2020	Best Costume Design	Retno Ratih Damayanti	Nominated	
Maya Awards	8 February 2020	Best Makeup & Hair	Jerry Octavianus	Nominated	
Maya Awards	8 February 2020	Best Sound	Krisna Purna, Khikmawan Santosa, Satrio Budiono, and Wahyu Tri Purnomo	Nominated	
Maya Awards	8 February 2020	Best Score	Andhika Triyadi	Nominated	
