= Homecoming (2019 Indonesian film) =

- Release poster
- Directed by: Adriyanto Dewo
- Written by: Adriyanto Dewo
- Produced by: Perlita Desiani
- Starring: Asmara Abigail; Putri Ayudya; Ibnu Jamil; Yoga Pratama
- Cinematography: Vera Lestafa
- Edited by: Arifin Cu'unk
- Music by: Indra Perkasa
- Production companies: Lifelike Pictures; Relate Films
- Distributed by: Mola TV
- Release date: 9 December 2019 (IFFAM)
- Running time: 93 minutes
- Country: Indonesia
- Language: Indonesian

Homecoming (Indonesian: Mudik) is a 2019 Indonesian drama film, written and directed by Adriyanto Dewo. The film stars Asmara Abigail, Putri Ayudya, Ibnu Jamil, and Yoga Pratama. The film tells about mudik, a tradition where migrants return to their hometown before major holidays.

The film had its world premiere at the 2019 International Film Festival and Awards Macao during the International Competition segment. The film won the Citra Award for Best Original Screenplay at the 2020 Indonesian Film Festival, with other eight nominations, including for Best Picture, Best Actor (Jamil), Best Actress (Ayudya), Best Supporting Actor (Pratama), and Best Supporting Actress (Abigail).

== Premise ==
Aida goes on a road trip with her husband, Firman, to travel to their hometown. During the trip, they are involved in an accident leading them to meet Santi, a rural housewife. The event changes how Aida and Firman view a marriage and also find answers to her questions in life.

== Cast ==
- Putri Ayudya as Aida
- Ibnu Jamil as Firman
- Asmara Abigail as Santi
- Yoga Pratama as Agus
- Eduwart Manalu as Sapto

== Production ==
The idea of Homecoming was conceived by Adriyanto Dewo, after realizing that behind the euphoria of mudik, fatal accidents also happen where many people lose their family members to.

== Release ==
Homecoming had its world premiere, competing in the International Competition segment, at the 2019 International Film Festival and Awards Macao. It was also screened at the 2020 CinemAsia Film Festival in March during the Jury Award competition. Mola TV acquired the distribution rights to the film, releasing it on 28 August 2020. Two weeks after the release date, the film garnered more than 55,000 viewers.

== Accolades ==
Award	Date	Category	Recipient	Result	Ref.
Citra Awards	5 December 2020	Best Picture	Perlita Desiani	Nominated	
Citra Awards	5 December 2020	Best Actor	Ibnu Jamil	Nominated	
Citra Awards	5 December 2020	Best Actress	Putri Ayudya	Nominated	
Citra Awards	5 December 2020	Best Supporting Actor	Yoga Pratama	Nominated	
Citra Awards	5 December 2020	Best Supporting Actress	Asmara Abigail	Nominated	
Citra Awards	5 December 2020	Best Original Screenplay	Adriyanto Dewo	Won	
Citra Awards	5 December 2020	Best Original Score	Lie Indra Perkasa	Nominated	
Citra Awards	5 December 2020	Best Cinematography	Vera Lestafa	Nominated	
Citra Awards	5 December 2020	Best Film Editing	Arifin Cuunk	Nominated	
Maya Awards	6-7 March 2021	Best Feature Film	Perlita Desiani	Nominated	
Maya Awards	6-7 March 2021	Best Director	Adriyanto Dewo	Nominated	
Maya Awards	6-7 March 2021	Best Actress	Putri Ayudya	Won	
Maya Awards	6-7 March 2021	Best Supporting Actor	Yoga Pratama	Nominated	
Maya Awards	6-7 March 2021	Best Supporting Actress	Asmara Abigail	Nominated	
Maya Awards	6-7 March 2021	Best Original Screenplay	Adriyanto Dewo	Won	
Maya Awards	6-7 March 2021	Best Cinematography	Vera Lestafa	Nominated	
Maya Awards	6-7 March 2021	Best Original Score	Lie Indra Perkasa	Nominated	
