= Preman =

Preman may refer to:

- Preman (Indonesian gangster)
- Preman (film), a 2021 Indonesian action film
