= Citra Award for Best Actress =

Award given annually at the Indonesian Film Festival

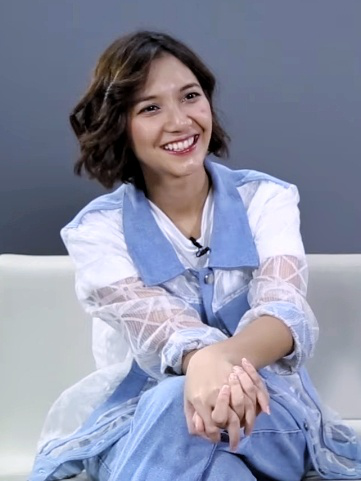
- Current recipient: Sheila Dara Aisha
- Awarded for: Best actress of the year
- Country: Indonesia
- Presented by: Indonesian Film Festival
- First award: 1955
- Currently held by: Sheila Dara Aisha, Sore: Wife from the Future (2025)

Highlights
- Most wins: Christine Hakim (6)
- Most nominations: Christine Hakim (10)
- Website: festivalfilm.id

The Citra Award for Best Actress (Indonesian: Piala Citra untuk Pemeran Utama Perempuan Terbaik) is an award given at the Indonesian Film Festival (FFI) to Indonesian actresses for their achievements in leading roles. The Citra Awards, described by Screen International as "Indonesia's equivalent to the Oscars", are the country's most prestigious film awards and are intended to recognize achievements in films as well as to draw public interest to the film industry.

Sheila Dara Aisha is the most recent winner for her performance in Sore: Wife from the Future at the 2025 ceremony.

== History ==
The Citra Awards, then known as the Indonesian Film Festival Awards, were first given in 1955 to two winners without a nomination process: Dhalia (Lewat Djam Malam) and Fifi Young (Tarmina). The two-way tie, also found in the Best Film and Best Actor categories, was controversial as film critics considered Lewat Djam Malam the superior film, leading to allegations that Djamaluddin Malik had bought Tarmina's prize. Succeeding festivals were held in 1960 and 1967 and annually since 1973.

There were no Citra Awards given between 1993 and 2003 due to sharp decline in domestic film production. It was reinstated as an annual event in 2004 after receiving funds from the Indonesian government.

Christine Hakim is the most decorated actress with 6 awards out of 10 nominations in this category. She has also received 3 additional awards out of 4 nominations in the Best Supporting Actress category, bringing her overall total to 9 awards out of 14 nominations. Meriam Bellina has won twice out of 6 nominations, whereas Lydia Kandou and Yenny Rachman each won 2 of their 5 nominations. Atiqah Hasiholan has received the most nominations without winning any with four, followed by Jajang C. Noer, Nurul Arifin, Paramitha Rusady, and Zoraya Perucha with three nominations without any wins. However, Noer has two wins as a supporting actress for Mer's Lips in 1992 and Cinta tapi Beda in 2013.

Asha Smara Darra became the first trans woman to receive a Citra Award nomination in 2023 for her debut performance in Sara.

Two actresses from the same film have been nominated for Best Actress in the same year: Pasir Berbisik and Eliana, Eliana in 2001, Virgin in 2005, as well as Mengejar Mas-Mas in 2007. Of these, only Dinna Olivia (Mengejar Mas-Mas) managed to win.

== Nominations and awards ==
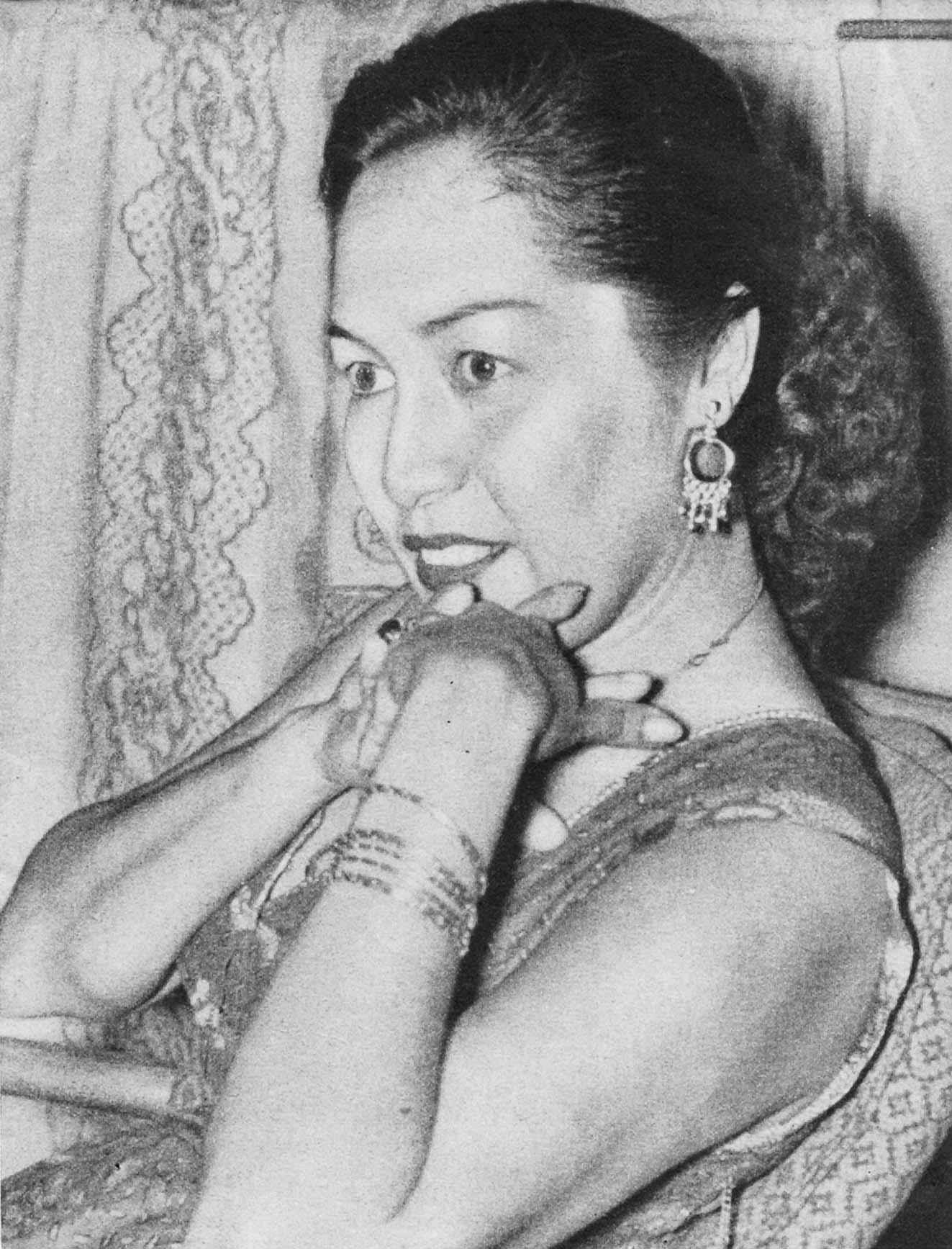
Fifi Young won one of the inaugural Citra Awards for Best Actress.

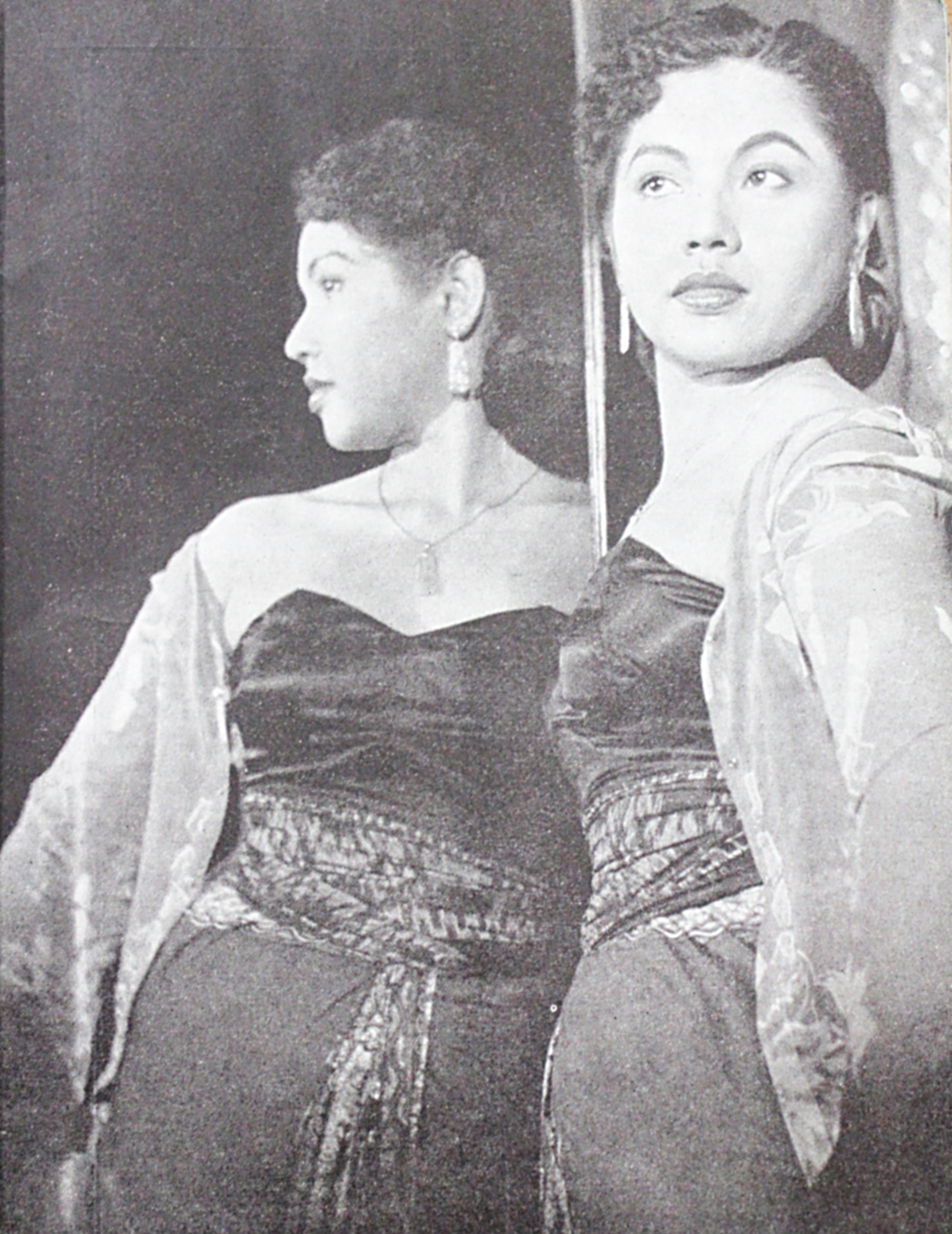
Dhalia won the other inaugural Citra Award for Best Actress.

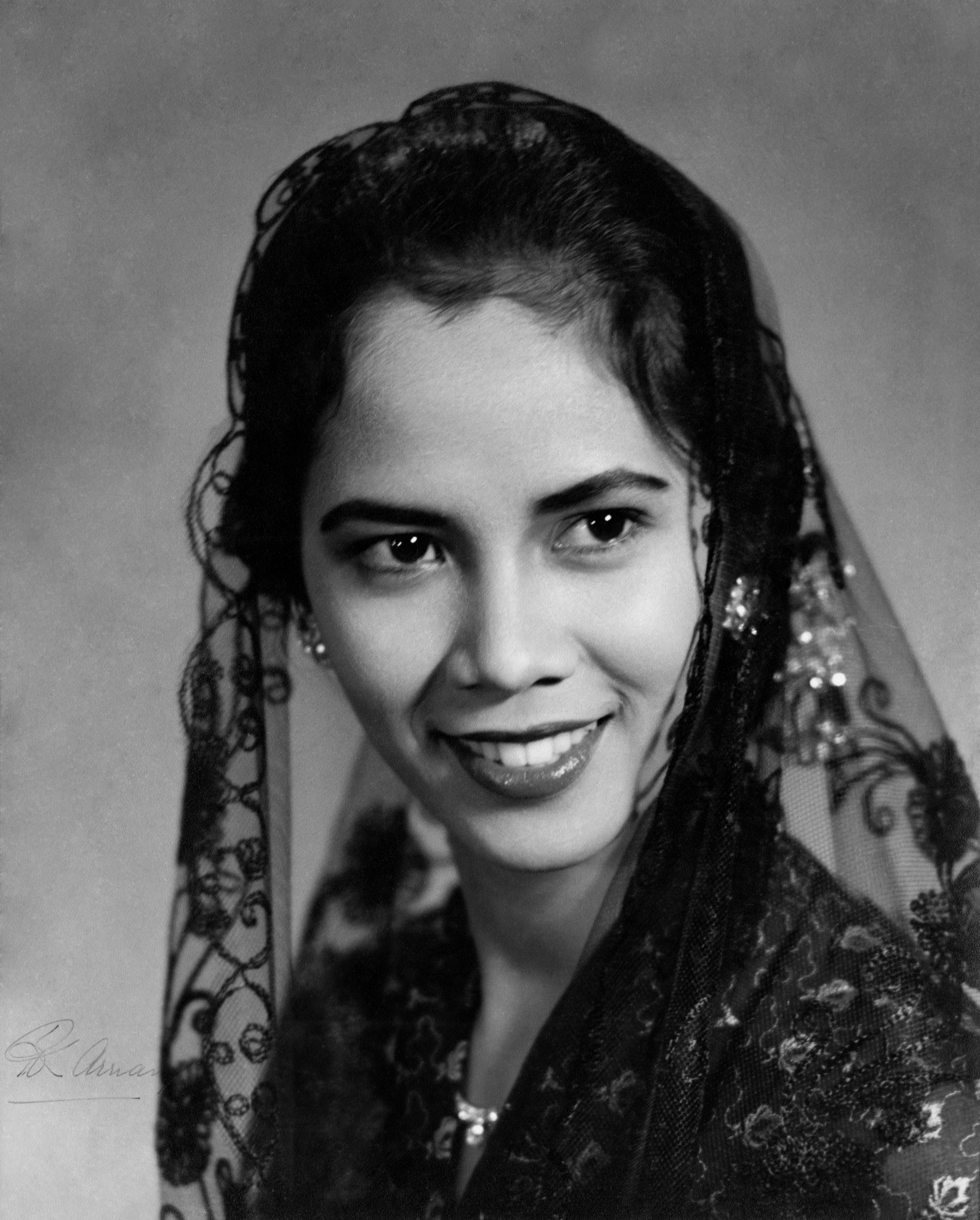
Farida Arriany won the award in 1960.

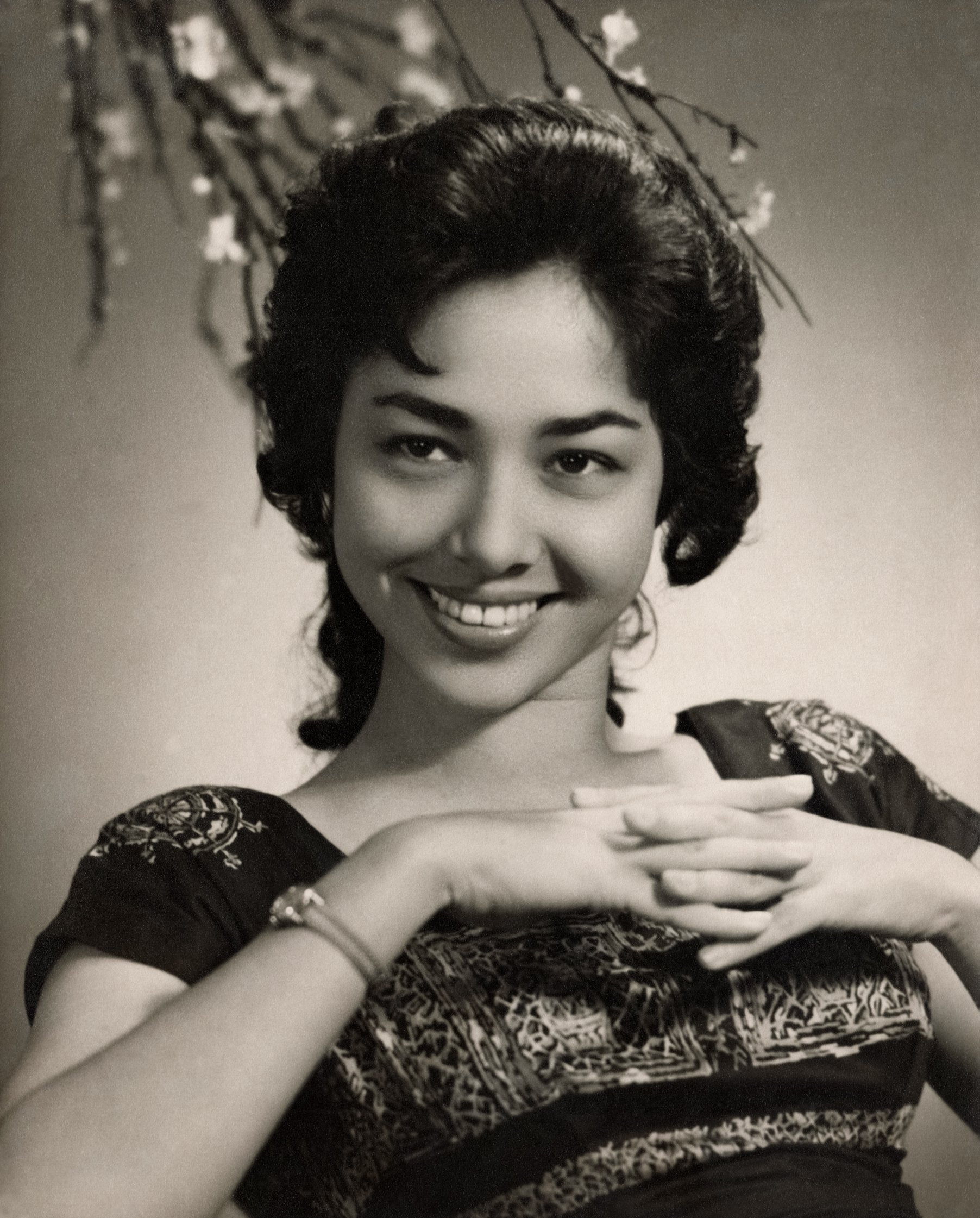
Mieke Wijaya won two Citra Awards out of two nominations.

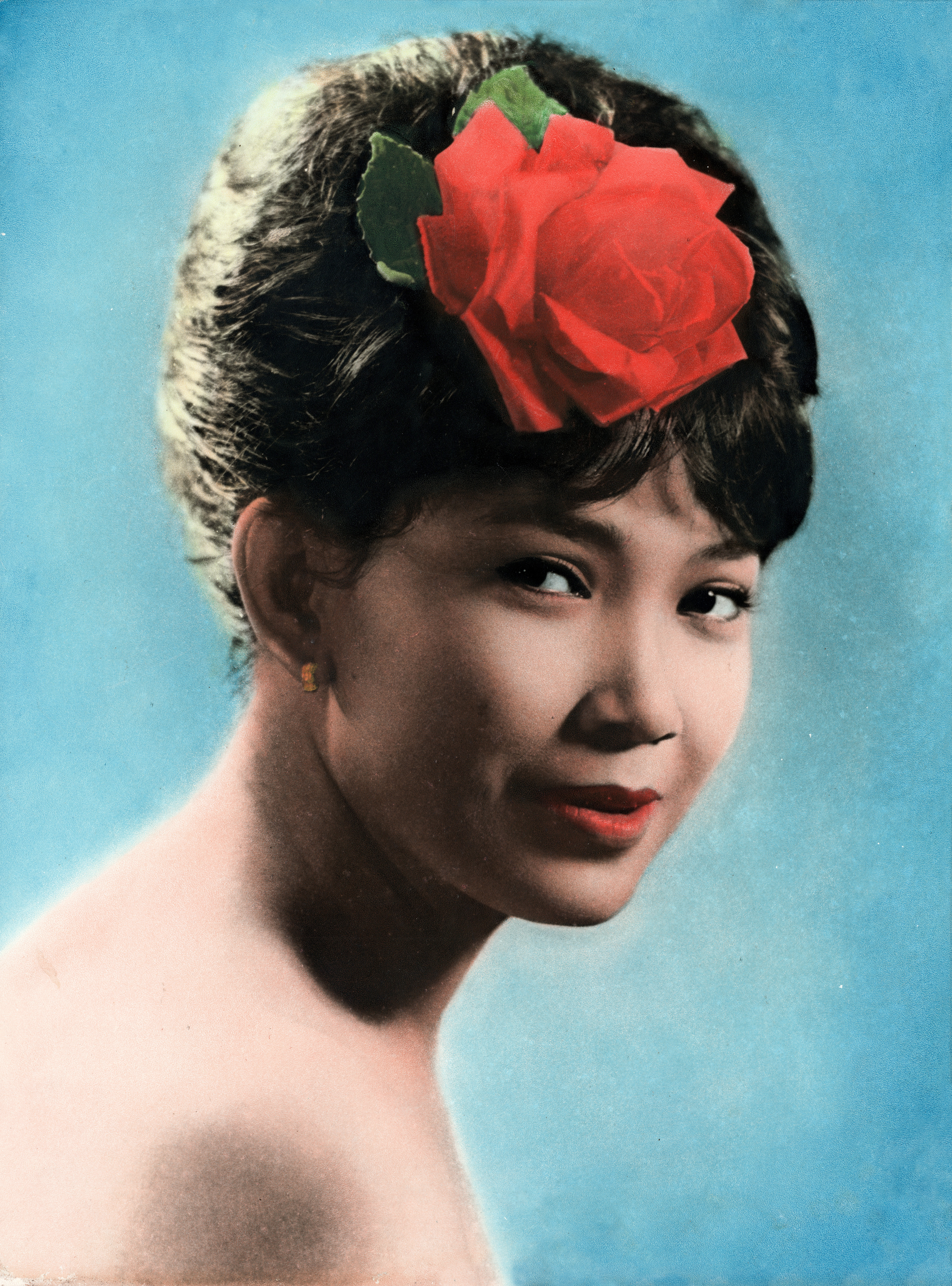
Rima Melati won the Citra Award in 1973.

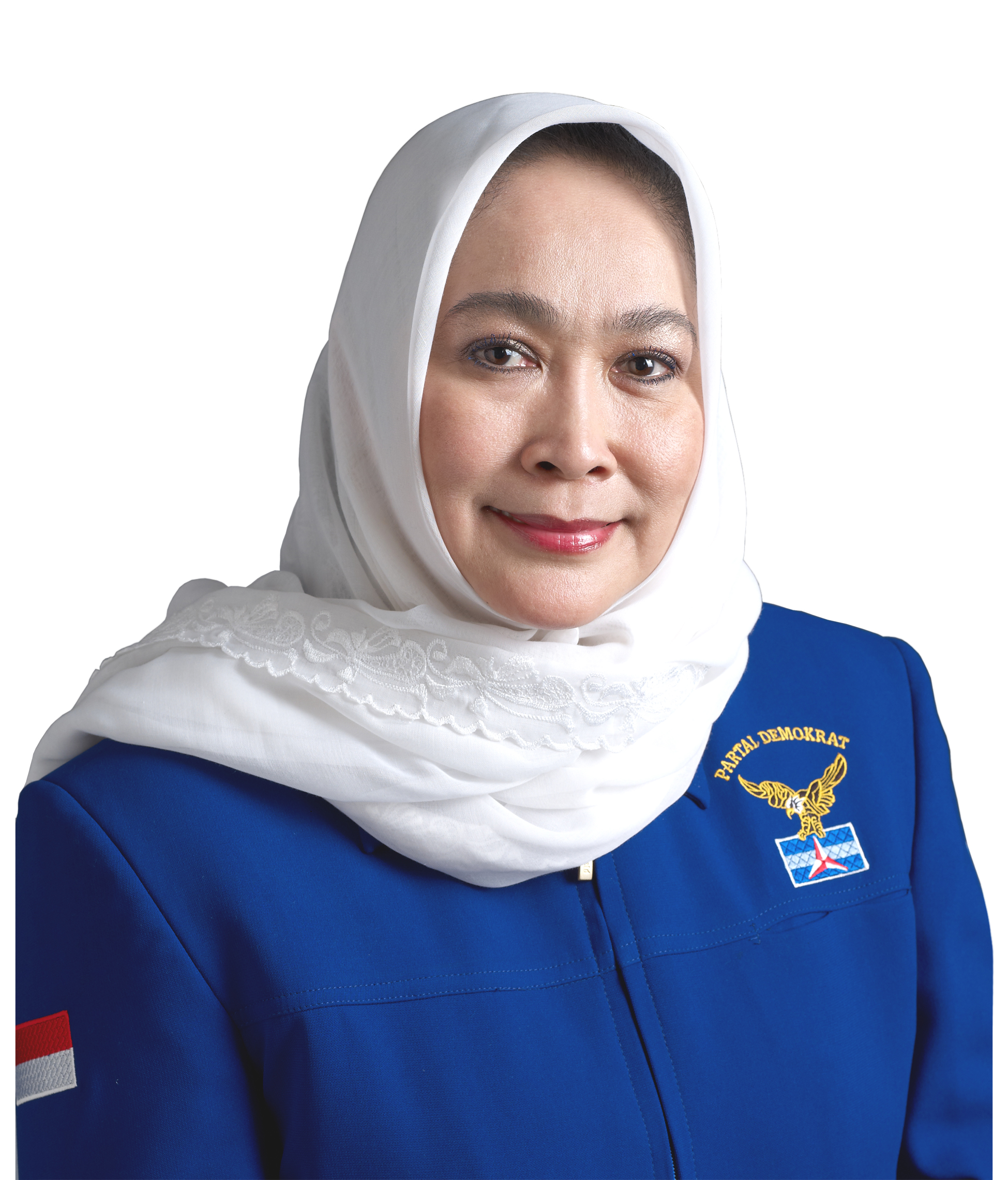
Yenny Rachman with the Citra Award she won in 1982

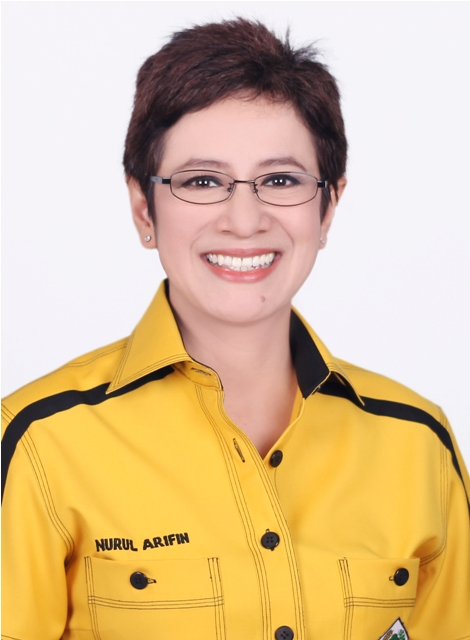
Nurul Arifin has received three nominations but no wins.

Sign	Meaning
‡	Indicates the winner

Winners are highlighted in blue and listed in bold.

=== 1950s ===
Year	Recipient	Film	Ref
**1955** (1st)	**Dhalia‡** TIE	Lewat Djam Malam	
**1955** (1st)	**Fifi Young** TIE	**Tarmina**	
1956	NOT HELD		
1957	NOT HELD		
1958	NOT HELD		
1959	NOT HELD		

=== 1960s ===
Year	Recipient	Film	Ref
**1960** (2nd)	**Farida Arriany**	**Anakku Sajang**	
1961	NOT HELD		
1962	NOT HELD		
1963	NOT HELD		
1964	NOT HELD		
1965	NOT HELD		
1966	NOT HELD		
**1967** (3rd)	**Mieke Wijaya**	**Gadis Kerudung Putih**	
1968	NOT HELD		
1969	NOT HELD		

=== 1970s ===
Year	Recipient	Film	Ref
1970	NOT HELD		
1971	NOT HELD		
1972	NOT HELD		
**1973** (4th)	**Rima Melati**	**Intan Berduri**	
**1974** (5th)	**Christine Hakim**	**Cinta Pertama**	(Note: Award given as "Best Actress (with Praise)" (Pemeran Utama Wanita Terbaik Dengan Pujian); a similar distinction was made with the Best Actor award. Hakim received the Citra.)
**1974** (5th)	Lenny Marlina	Rio Anakku	(Note: Award given as "Best Actress (with Recognition)" (Pemeran Utama Wanita Terbaik Dengan Penghargaan); a similar distinction was made with the Best Actor award. This was, in effect, a "runner up" award.)
**1975** (6th)	**Tanty Josepha**	**Setulus Hatimu**	
**1976** (7th)	**Rina Hasyim**	Semalam di Malaysia	
**1977** (8th)	**Christine Hakim (2)**	**Sesuatu yang Indah**	
**1978** (9th)	**Joice Erna**	**Suci Sang Primadona**	
**1979** (10th)	**Christine Hakim (3)**	**Pengemis dan Tukang Becak**	
**1979** (10th)	Yenny Rachman	Binalnya Anak Muda	
**1979** (10th)	Mutiara Sani	Kemelut Hidup	
**1979** (10th)	Suzzanna	Pulau Cinta	
**1979** (10th)	Tutie Kirana	Buaya Deli	

=== 1980s ===
Year	Recipient	Film	Ref
1980	Yenny Rachman‡	Kabut Sutra Ungu	
1980	Farah Meuthia	Yuyun Pasien Rumah Sakit Jiwa	
1980	Ira Maya Sopha	Ira Maya si Anak Tiri	
1980	Marini	Anna Maria	
1980	Nia Daniati	Antara Dia dan Aku	
1981	Mieke Wijaya‡ (2)	Kembang Semusim	
1981	Jessy Gusman	Usia 18	
1981	Marlia Hardi	Busana dalam Mimpi	
1981	Nungki Kusumastuti	Perempuan dalam Pasungan	
1981	Widyawati	Buah Hati Mama	
1982	Yenny Rachman‡ (2)	Gadis Marathon	
1982	Ita Mustafa	Bukan Istri Pilihan	
1982	Lenny Marlina	Jangan Ambil Nyawaku	
1982	Suzzanna	Ratu Ilmu Hitam	
1982	Tanty Josepha	Dr. Karmila	
1983	Christine Hakim‡ (4)	Di Balik Kelambu	
1983	Dewi Irawan	Titian Serambut Dibelah Tujuh	
1983	Meriam Bellina	Perkawinan 83	
1983	Widyawati	Amalia SH	
1984	Meriam Bellina‡	Cinta di Balik Noda	
1984	Christine Hakim	Ponirah Terpidana	
1984	Yenny Rachman	Budak Nafsu	
1984	Lydia Kandou	Untukmu Kuserahkan Segalanya	
1984	Zoraya Perucha	Yang	
1985	Christine Hakim‡ (5)	Kerikil-Kerikil Tajam	
1985	Dewi Yull	Kembang Kertas	
1985	Yenny Rachman	Doea Tanda Mata	
1985	Meriam Bellina	Kabut Perkawinan	
1986	Tuti Indra Malaon‡	Ibunda	
1986	Christine Hakim	Bila Saatnya Tiba	
1986	Lydia Kandou	Kejarlah Daku Kau Kutangkap	
1986	Meriam Bellina	Kulihat Cinta di Matanya	
1986	Zoraya Perucha	Pondok Cinta	
1987	Widyawati‡	Arini (Masih Ada Kereta yang Akan Lewat)	
1987	Dewi Yull	Penyesalan Seumur Hidup	
1987	Ita Mustafa	Tinggal Sesaat Lagi	
1987	Marissa Haque	Biarkan Bulan Itu	
1987	Zoraya Perucha	Secawan Anggur Kebimbangan	
1988	Christine Hakim‡ (6)	Tjoet Nja' Dhien	
1988	Meriam Bellina	Tatkala Mimpi Berakhir	
1988	Nurul Arifin	Istana Kecantikan	
1989	Tuti Indra Malaon‡ (2)	Pacar Ketinggalan Kereta	
1989	Ira Wibowo	Malioboro	
1989	Neno Warisman	Semua Sayang Kamu	
1989	Paramitha Rusady	Si Kabayan Saba Kota	

=== 1990s ===
Year	Recipient	Film	Ref
1990	Meriam Bellina‡ (2)	Taksi	
1990	Lydia Kandou	Cas Cis Cus (Sonata di Tengah Kota)	
1990	Nurul Arifin	2 dari 3 Laki-Laki	
1990	Widyawati	Sesaat dalam Pelukan	
1991	Lydia Kandou‡	Boneka dari Indiana	
1991	Dian Nitami	Perwira dan Ksatria	
1991	Nia Zulkarnaen	Lagu Untuk Seruni	
1991	Paramitha Rusady	Boss Carmad	
1991	Sonia Dara Carrascalao	Langit Kembali Biru	
1992	Lydia Kandou‡ (2)	Ramadhan dan Ramona	
1992	Bella Esperance Lee	Bibir Mer	
1992	Cornelia Agatha	Rini Tomboy	
1992	Nurul Arifin	Catatan Si Emon	
1992	Paramitha Rusady	Selembut Wajah Anggun	

=== 2000s ===
Year	Recipient	Film	Ref
2004	Dian Sastrowardoyo‡	Ada Apa dengan Cinta?	
2004	Christine Hakim	Pasir Berbisik	
2004	Dian Sastrowardoyo	Pasir Berbisik	
2004	Jajang C. Noer	Eliana, Eliana	
2004	Rachel Maryam	Eliana, Eliana	
2005	Marcella Zalianty‡	Brownies	
2005	Anggia Yulia Angely	Virgin	
2005	Cornelia Agatha	Detik Terakhir	
2005	Laudya Cynthia Bella	Virgin	
2005	Sigi Wimala	Tentang Dia	
2006	Nirina Zubir‡	Heart	
2006	Ayu Ratna	Garasi	
2006	Luna Maya	Ruang	
2006	Shanty	Berbagi Suami	
2006	Titi Kamal	Mendadak Dangdut	
2007	Dinna Olivia‡	Mengejar Mas-Mas	
2007	Acha Septriasa	Love Is Cinta	
2007	Marsha Timothy	Merah Itu Cinta	
2007	Nirina Zubir	Kamulah Satu-Satunya	
2007	Poppy Sovia	Mengejar Mas-Mas	
2008	Fahrani‡	Radit & Jani	
2008	Ayu Laksmi	Under the Tree	
2008	Ladya Cheryl	Fiksi.	
2008	Yenny Chang	May	
2008	Pevita Pearce	Lost in Love	
2009	Titi Rajo Bintang‡	Mereka Bilang, Saya Monyet!	
2009	Atiqah Hasiholan	Ruma Maida	
2009	Aty Nurhayati Djosan	Emak Ingin Naik Haji	
2009	Leony Vitria Hartanti	Identitas	
2009	Revalina S. Temat	Perempuan Berkalung Sorban	

=== 2010s ===
Year	Recipient	Film	Ref
2010	Laura Basuki‡	3 Hati Dua Dunia Satu Cinta	
2010	Fanny Fabriana	Hari Untuk Amanda	
2010	Jajang C. Noer	7 Hati 7 Cinta 7 Wanita	
2010	Tika Bravani	Alangkah Lucunya (Negeri Ini)	
2010	Titi Rajo Bintang	Minggu Pagi di Victoria Park	
2011	Prisia Nasution‡	Sang Penari	
2011	Dinda Hauw	Surat Kecil untuk Tuhan	
2011	Fanny Fabriana	True Love	
2011	Gita Novalista	The Mirror Never Lies	
2011	Salma Paramitha	Rindu Purnama	
2012	Acha Septriasa‡	Test Pack: You're My Baby	
2012	Annisa Hertami	Soegija	
2012	Atiqah Hasiholan	Hello Goodbye	
2012	Geraldine Sianturi	Demi Ucok	
2012	Jajang C. Noer	Mata Tertutup	
2013	Adinia Wirasti‡	Laura & Marsha	
2013	Happy Salma	Air Mata Terakhir Bunda	
2013	Imelda Therinne	Belenggu	
2013	Laudya Cynthia Bella	Belenggu	
2013	Laura Basuki	Madre	
2014	Dewi Irawan‡	Tabula Rasa	
2014	Atiqah Hasiholan	3 Nafas Likas	
2014	Revalina S. Temat	Hijrah Cinta	
2014	Maudy Koesnaedi	Soekarno	
2014	Prisia Nasution	Sokola Rimba	
2015	Tara Basro‡	A Copy of My Mind	
2015	Adinia Wirasti	Kapan Kawin?	
2015	Chelsea Islan	Di Balik 98	
2015	Dewi Sandra	Air Mata Surga	
2015	Marsha Timothy	Nada Untuk Asa	
2016	Cut Mini‡	Athirah	
2016	Christine Hakim	Ibu Maafkan Aku	
2016	Sha Ine Febriyanti	Nay	
2016	Chelsea Islan	Rudy Habibie	
2016	Atiqah Hasiholan	Wonderful Life	
2017	Putri Marino‡	Posesif	
2017	Adinia Wirasti	Critical Eleven	
2017	Dian Sastrowardoyo	Kartini	
2017	Sheryl Sheinafia	Galih & Ratna	
2017	Tatjana Saphira	Sweet 20	
2018	Marsha Timothy‡	Marlina the Murderer in Four Acts	
2018	Della Dartyan	Love for Sale	
2018	Prisia Nasution	Lima	
2018	Dian Sastrowardoyo	Aruna & Her Palate	
2018	Putri Ayudya	Kafir: A Deal with the Devil	
2019	Raihaanun‡	27 Steps of May	
2019	Adhisty Zara	Two Blue Stripes	
2019	Nirina Zubir	Cemara's Family	
2019	Sha Ine Febriyanti	This Earth of Mankind	
2019	Sissy Priscillia	Milly & Mamet: Ini Bukan Cinta & Rangga	

=== 2020s ===
Year	Recipient	Film	Ref
**2020** (40th)	**Laura Basuki (2)**	**Susi Susanti: Love All**	
**2020** (40th)	Faradina Mufti	Crazy Awesome Teachers	
**2020** (40th)	Jessica Mila	Imperfect	
**2020** (40th)	Putri Ayudya	Homecoming	
**2020** (40th)	Tara Basro	Impetigore	
**2020** (40th)	Ully Triani	Humba Dreams	
**2021** (41st)	**Arawinda Kirana**	**Yuni**	
**2021** (41st)	Hana Malasan	Cinta Bete	
**2021** (41st)	Nirina Zubir	Paranoia	
**2021** (41st)	Shenina Cinnamon	Photocopier	
**2021** (41st)	Wulan Guritno	Jakarta vs Everybody	
**2022** (42nd)	**Ladya Cheryl**	**Vengeance Is Mine, All Others Pay Cash**	
**2022** (42nd)	Happy Salma	Before, Now & Then	
**2022** (42nd)	Marsha Timothy	The Red Point of Marriage	
**2022** (42nd)	Maudy Koesnaedi	Losmen Bu Broto	
**2022** (42nd)	Tika Panggabean	Missing Home	
**2023** (43rd)	**Sha Ine Febriyanti**	**Andragogy**	
**2023** (43rd)	Asha Smara Darra	Sara	
**2023** (43rd)	Aurora Ribero	Like & Share	
**2023** (43rd)	Jajang C. Noer	The Prize	
**2023** (43rd)	Laura Basuki	Sleep Call	
**2024** (44th)	**Nirina Zubir**	**Falling in Love Like in Movies**	
**2024** (44th)	Aghniny Haque	Harlot's Prayer	
**2024** (44th)	Faradina Mufti	Grave Torture	
**2024** (44th)	Laura Basuki	Heartbreak Motel	
**2024** (44th)	Marissa Anita	Crocodile Tears	
**2025** (45th)	**Sheila Dara Aisha**	**Sore: Wife from the Future**	
**2025** (45th)	Acha Septriasa	Qodrat 2	
**2025** (45th)	Aurora Ribero	The Shadow Strays	
**2025** (45th)	Claresta Taufan	On Your Lap	
**2025** (45th)	Lola Amaria	Gowok: Javanese Kamasutra	

== Multiple wins and nominations ==
Wins	Nominations	Actress
6	10	Christine Hakim
2	8	Meriam Bellina
2	5	Lydia Kandou, Yenny Rachman
2	4	Laura Basuki
2	2	Mieke Wijaya, Tuti Indra Malaon
1	4	Dian Sastrowardoyo, Marsha Timothy, Nirina Zubir, Widyawati
1	3	Adinia Wirasti, Prisia Nasution, Sha Ine Febriyanti
1	2	Acha Septriasa, Dewi Irawan, Ladya Cheryl, Tanty Josepha, Tara Basro, Titi Rajo Bintang
0	4	Atiqah Hasiholan, Jajang C. Noer
0	3	Nurul Arifin, Paramitha Rusady, Zoraya Perucha
0	2	Chelsea Islan, Cornelia Agatha, Dewi Yull, Fanny Fabriana, Happy Salma, Ita Mustafa, Laudya Cynthia Bella, Lenny Marlina, Maudy Koesnaedi, Putri Ayudya, Revalina S. Temat, Suzzanna

== See also ==
- Cinema of Indonesia
- Indonesian Film Festival
- Citra Award for Best Picture
- Citra Award for Best Director
- Citra Award for Best Actor
- Citra Award for Best Supporting Actor
- Citra Award for Best Supporting Actress
- Maya Awards
