= 27 Steps of May =

2018 drama film

- Theatrical release poster
- Directed by: Ravi Bharwani
- Written by: Rayya Makarim
- Produced by: Ravi Bharwani; Rayya Makarim; Wilza Lubis
- Starring: Raihaanun; Lukman Sardi; Ario Bayu
- Cinematography: Ipung Rachmat Syaiful
- Edited by: Wawan I. Wibowo; Lilik Subagyo
- Music by: Thoersi Argeswara
- Production company: Green Glow Pictures
- Release dates: 8 October 2018 (Busan); 27 April 2019
- Running time: 112 minutes
- Country: Indonesia
- Language: Indonesian

27 Steps of May is a 2018 Indonesian drama film directed by Ravi Bharwani and written by Rayya Makarim. It stars Raihaanun, Lukman Sardi and Ario Bayu.

The film had its world premiere at the 23rd Busan International Film Festival during the program A Window on Asian Cinema.

== Premise ==
May, a victim of sexual violence during the May 1998 riots, withdraws from life. Meanwhile, her father deals with the guilt by becoming a boxer.

== Cast ==
- Raihaanun as May
- Lukman Sardi as May's father
- Ario Bayu as magician
- Verdi Solaiman as courier
- Henky Solaiman as boxing manager
- Otig Pakis as boxing trainer
- Norman Akyuwen as boxing manager
- Sapto Soetarjo as shaman
- Richard Oh as Priest Tao
- Joko Anwar as boxing manager

== Release ==
27 Steps of May had its world premiere at the 23rd Busan International Film Festival on 8 October 2018. The film had its Indonesian premiere at the 13th Jogja-NETPAC Asian Film Festival, where it won the main prize Golden Hanoman Award. The film was released to the theatres in Indonesia on 27 April 2019. It garnered 57,416 spectators during its run and grossed Rp 2.2 billion ($146,830).

Netflix acquired its distribution rights, and released it on 1 October 2021.

== Accolades ==
Award	Date	Category	Recipient	Result	Ref.
Jogja-NETPAC Asian Film Festival	6 December 2018	Golden Hanoman Award	27 Steps of May	Won	
Malaysia Golden Global Awards	20 July 2019	New Hope Award	Ravi Bharwani	Won	
Malaysia Golden Global Awards	20 July 2019	Best Actor	Lukman Sardi	Won	
Indonesian Film Festival	8 December 2019	Best Picture	Wilza Lubis, Rayya Makarim, and Ravi Bharwani	Nominated	
Indonesian Film Festival	8 December 2019	Best Director	Ravi Bharwani	Nominated	
Indonesian Film Festival	8 December 2019	Best Actor	Lukman Sardi	Nominated	
Indonesian Film Festival	8 December 2019	Best Actress	Raihaanun	Won	
Indonesian Film Festival	8 December 2019	Best Supporting Actor	Verdi Solaiman	Nominated	
Indonesian Film Festival	8 December 2019	Best Original Screenplay	Rayya Makarim	Nominated	
Indonesian Film Festival	8 December 2019	Best Original Score	Thoersi Argeswara	Nominated	
Indonesian Film Festival	8 December 2019	Best Art Direction	Vida Sylvia	Nominated	
Indonesian Film Festival	8 December 2019	Best Editing	Wawan I. Wibowo and Lilik Subagyo	Nominated	
Maya Awards	8 February 2020	Best Feature Film	Wilza Lubis, Rayya Makarim, and Ravi Bharwani	Nominated	
Maya Awards	8 February 2020	Best Director	Ravi Bharwani	Nominated	
Maya Awards	8 February 2020	Best Actor in a Leading Role	Lukman Sardi	Won	
Maya Awards	8 February 2020	Best Actress in a Leading Role	Raihaanun	Won	
Maya Awards	8 February 2020	Best Original Screenplay	Rayya Makarim	Nominated	
