= Ully Sigar Rusady =

- Born: 4 January 1950 (age 76); Garut, West Java, Indonesia
- Occupations: Musician; environment activist
- Instruments: Guitar; bass; vocals
- Years active: 1964–present

Ully Sigar Rusady (born 4 January 1950 in Garut, West Java) is an Indonesian musician and environmental activist. She wrote many environmental-themed songs performed by singers such as Nur Afni Octavia, Anggun C. Sasmi, Ita Purnamasari, Bangkit Sanjaya, SAS, Arthur Kaunang, and Sonatha Tanjung.

== Early life ==
Ully is the elder sister of Indonesian actress Paramitha Rusady.

She learned guitar from her parents, Ayu Marry Zumarya and Raden Mas Yus Rusady Wirahaditenaya in Bandung, West Java. As a teenager, she relocated to Makassar, South Sulawesi to follow her father, who was in the army. During her time in Makassar, she founded bands Puspa Nita as the lead guitarist alongside five of his friends since early-1964, band plays music in the British Invasion and Rock 'n' Roll genres. They frequently perform songs by legendary international bands such as the Beatles, the Rolling Stones, the Shadows, the Kinks, the Who, the Yardbirds, and the Hollies among other groups of the British Invasion and his break-up in early-1968. In early-1968, she founded bands Shinta Eka Paksi as the bassist since early-1968, band plays music in the British Rock Giant and Hard Rock genres. They frequently perform songs by legendary international bands such as Led Zeppelin, Grand Funk Railroad, Pink Floyd, Deep Purple, Black Sabbath, Jimi Hendrix, and the Doors.

After graduating from high school. In mid-1968, she met a businessman named Muhammad Ronny Sigar and began a relationship with him in mid-1968. In late-1968, she married Muhammad Ronny Sigar in Makassar since late-1968. In 1969, the Rusady family (including members who were friends from his high school, Puspa Nita and Shinta Eka Paksi) moved to Manado, North Sulawesi. In Manado, he was with his band Shinta Eka Paksi pursued higher education at Sam Ratulangi University (UNSRAT) and graduated in 1974.

In 1974, her family moved to Jakarta. In Jakarta, he also pursued higher education at the Jakarta Institute of the Arts (IKJ)—known at the time as the Jakarta Arts Education Institute (LPKJ)—but did not complete his studies, leaving in 1975. Later in 1975, She learned contemporary music at the Indonesia Music Foundation with Slamet Abdul Sjukur. Her musical talent was further recognised through her participation in major competitions, including the National Festival of Popular Song in 1978 and 1981.

After her husband, Mohammad Ronny Sigar, passed away in 1993, a time during which she was deeply focused on her children’s religious education, Ully later remarried, wedding Hary Tranggono in 2000.

== Festivals ==
- National Festival of Popular Song (1978 and 1981).
- ASEAN Popular Songwriting Festival (1982 and 1983).
- World Music Oriental Festival at Sarajevo, Bosnia-Harzegovina (2005).

== Discography ==
- Rimba Gelap (producer Irama Mas, 1978).
- Rimba Gelap versi II (Irama Mas/ Virgo Ramayana).
- Pelita dalam Gulita (Jackson Records, 1981).
- Pengakuan (Jackson Records, 1983).
- Senandung Kabut Biru (Billboard, 1986).
- Titian Karier (Jackson/Metrotama).
- Satulah Indonesia with Paramitha Rusady (Blackboard).
- Air Sumber Kehidupan (USR Associates, 2003).
