= Nurul Arifin =

Indonesian actress

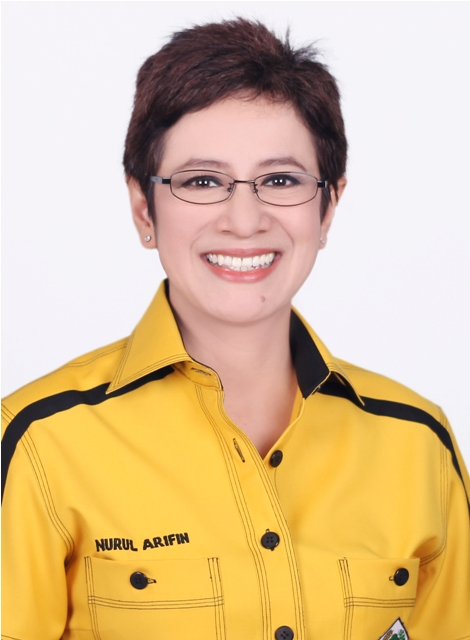

Member of the People's Representative Council of Indonesia

Personal details
- Born: 18 July 1966 (age 59); Bandung, West Java, Indonesia
- Spouse: Mayong Suryo Laksono (m. 1991)
- Children: 2

Nurul Qomaril Arifin (born 18 July 1966) is an Indonesian actress and politician. She has been a member of the People's Representative Council of Indonesia within the Golkar faction since 2004.

== Personal life ==
She was born and grew up in Bandung, where she finished her schooling in 1985. 15 years later, she started studying in Depok, where she completed a Bachelor and master's degree in political science and social science at the University of Indonesia.

She started acting in 1981 and has starred in Indonesian movies and cinetrons such as Catatan Si Emon (1991), Kelabang Seribu (1987) and Ketika cinta telah berlalu (1989).

== Awards and nominations ==
Year	Award	Category	Work	Result
1988	Indonesian Film Festival	Citra Award for Best Leading Actress	Istana Kecantikan	Nominated
1989	Indonesian Film Festival	Citra Award for Best Supporting Actress	Pacar Ketinggalan Kereta	Nominated
1990	Indonesian Film Festival	Citra Award for Best Leading Actress	2 dari 3 Laki-laki	Nominated
1992	Indonesian Film Festival	Citra Award for Best Leading Actress	Catatan Si Emon	Nominated

== Political career ==
She has been an advocate of AIDS/HIV awareness and equal gender right. Being a social activist and fighting against the under-representation of women in the legislative, she decided the join the Golkar party in 2003. She became a member of the DPR from the Golkar Faction for the period 2004-2009, 2009-2014, 2014–2019 and 2019-2024 for the Electoral District of West Java and currently serves as Deputy Secretary General of the Golkar Party. She is part of the Commission I of People's Representative Council. Two women are among the eleven deputy general chairs of the Golkar for the 2019–2024 term. Hetifah Sjaifudian and Nurul Arifin are the two. She was reelected for a fifth term in 2024 with 63,203 votes.
