= Bukan Cinderella =

- Release poster
- Directed by: Adi Garing
- Screenplay by: QueenB
- Story by: Dhety Azmi
- Based on: Bukan Cinderella by Dheti Azmi
- Produced by: Unchu Viejay
- Starring: Fujianti Utami; Rafael Adwel
- Cinematography: Fachmi J. Saad
- Edited by: Augit Prima
- Music by: Ganden Bramanto
- Production company: Super Media Pictures
- Release date: 28 July 2022
- Running time: 88 minutes
- Country: Indonesia
- Language: Indonesian

Bukan Cinderella is a 2022 Indonesian romantic comedy and drama film directed by Adi Garing, starring Fujianti Utami and Rafael Adwel. It was based on the novel of the same name by Dheti Azmi. The film was Utami's screen debut and she was heavily criticized after it became a commercial failure.

== Plot ==
Amora Olivia is a tough and fearless girl who shows persistence towards achieving her desires and dreams. After saving money for a long time, she finally manages to buy the shoes of her dreams. However, one day Amora realizes that one of her shoes has been swapped with someone else's shoe whose owner she does not know. Annoyed by this, she is determined to find her original shoes and shouts along the school corridor looking for one of her shoes. However, instead of getting shoes, Amora has to face the cool, arrogant, and disciplined school council president, Adam Wijaya. He hates Amora's attitude of casually causing a commotion in the school while looking for her shoes. He then forcibly dragged her to the counsellor's room. Amora's friends are also involved in this problem.

== Cast ==
- Fujianti Utami as Amora Olivia
- Rafael Adwel as Adam Wijaya
- Gusti Rayhan as Juna
- Annette Edoarda as Eka
- Claudy Putri as Dinda
- Damara Finch as Dicky
- Ahmad Pule as Budi
- Fajar Kibo as Ardi
- Febi Lora as Caca
- Fauzan Azzam as Keenan
- Raisya Bawazier as Sasa
- Jesslyn Elvareta as Kayla
- Evelin Natasha as Ika
- Cintaling as Rini
- Clarissa as Dista
- Tanta Ginting as Amora's father
- Dea Lestari as Amora's mother
- Erwin Cortez as Adam's father
- Putri Ayudya as Adam's mother
- Ence Bagus as Kodir
- Niniek Arum as Adam's housemaid
- Melly Saripah as counselling teacher
- Xena Xazi as Little Amora
- Ziggy Al Ghany as Little Adam
- Christian Loho as a boxing instructor

== Production ==
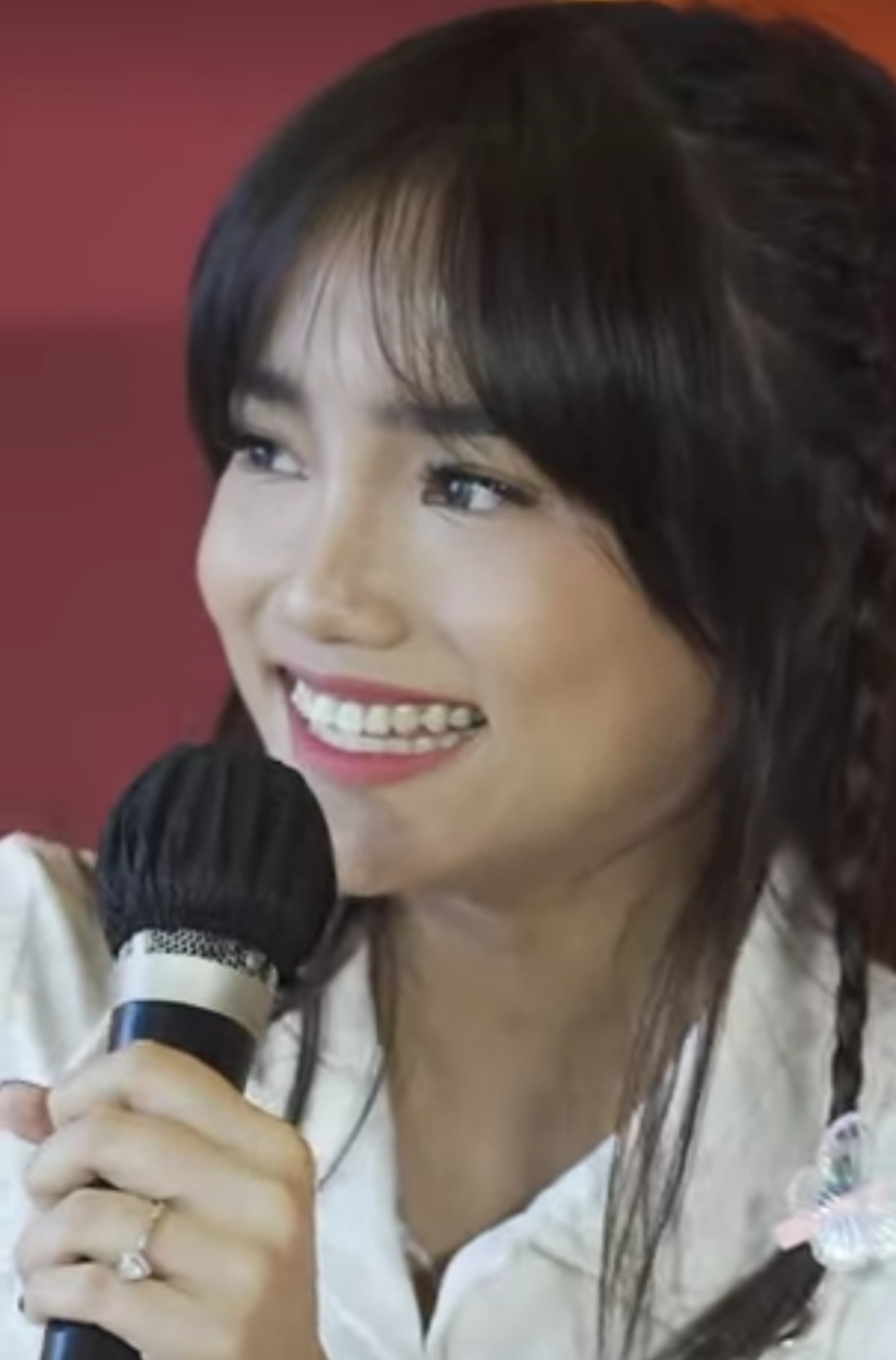
Fujianti Utami in 2023

Bukan Cinderella was produced by Unchu Viejay and directed by Adi Garing for Super Media Pictures. It was adapted from the novel of the same name by Dheti Azmi. The production of the film began in February 2022 in Sentul. It starred Fujianti Utami in her film debut and Rafael Adwel in a leading role. It also starred Gusti Rayhan, Annette Edoarda, Raisya Bawazier, Claudy Putri, Ahmad Pule, and Damara Finch in supporting roles.

In an interview with Kompas in June 2022, Garing revealed that there were difficulties in adapting the story from a novel into a screenplay. He also added that the casting of Utami as Amora was based on her popularity and social media followers.

During Utami's interview about her chemistry in the film, she said that Adwel is unclean. This resulted in criticizm toward her. She later apologized via her Instagram story in August 2022, however, she still received criticizm with some saying she needed to learn how to speak well in public.

== Release and reception ==
The Bukan Cinderella poster and trailer were released on 22 June 2022, and the film was screened on 28 July. Netizens doubted Utami's acting skills, but the film became a trending topic after the trailer was released.

The film received a negative response and caused Utami to be criticized heavily for her poor acting. She later described this as traumatic and refused all subsequent offers for acting jobs. She also added that she became the subject of discussion for three months due to various errors in the film. As of August 2022, the film was watched by around 30,000 people in theatres and was watched by 45,000 people on social media. These numbers were below the target number of viewers.

On 5 August, the film was pirated and distributed without permission on TikTok by a person who recorded the film screening in theatre. According to Super Media Pictures attorney Boy Sulimas, it caused the production house to lose around Rp 2 billion. The case was later reported to the police by the production house representative, Arti Fudiah.

In a video interview on social media, Fujianti Utami Putri or Fuji said the word "Najis" to Rafael Adwel. After that, the video went viral and reaped many slanderous comments aimed at Fuji. Fuji also apologized for her words to Rafael Adwel, her co-star in the film Bukan Cinderella.
