= Salvita Decorte =

Indonesian actress and model

- Born: 13 July 1990 (age 35); Bali, Indonesia
- Occupations: Actress, model
- Years active: 2014–present

Salvita Decorte (born 13 July 1990) is an Indonesian actress and model.

== Career ==
Decorte was born in Bali to an Indian/Indonesian father and a German mother. She started a career as a model at the age of 15 years, becoming a brand ambassador for Volcom in 2012. In addition, Salvita also inherited a love of art from her parents who were both painters; she specializes in abstract paintings.

Salvita's career as an actress began in 2014 with a supporting role in the film Mantan Terindah. She won the lead role in Lily: Bunga Terakhirku co-starring Baim Wong. Besides the big screen, Salvita has a starring role in season 1 of the HBO series Halfworlds.

== Filmography ==
=== Film ===
Year	Title	Role	Description
2007	Lawang Sewu	Maya	
2014	Mantan Terindah	Marsha	
2015	Lily: Bunga Terakhirku	Lily	Nominated – Tuti Indra Malaon Awards (Best Breakthrough Actress) at the 2015 Maya Awards
2018	The Night Comes For Us	Shinta	
2019	Dreadout	Nancy	
2019	Ratu Ilmu Hitam	Lina	
2019	Abracadabra	Sofnila	
2019	Glorious Days	Suci	
2021	Preman	Cherry	

=== Television ===
Year	Title	Role	Description	Network
2015	Halfworlds	Sarah	8 episodes	HBO
