= Putri Ayudya =

Indonesian actress (born 1988)

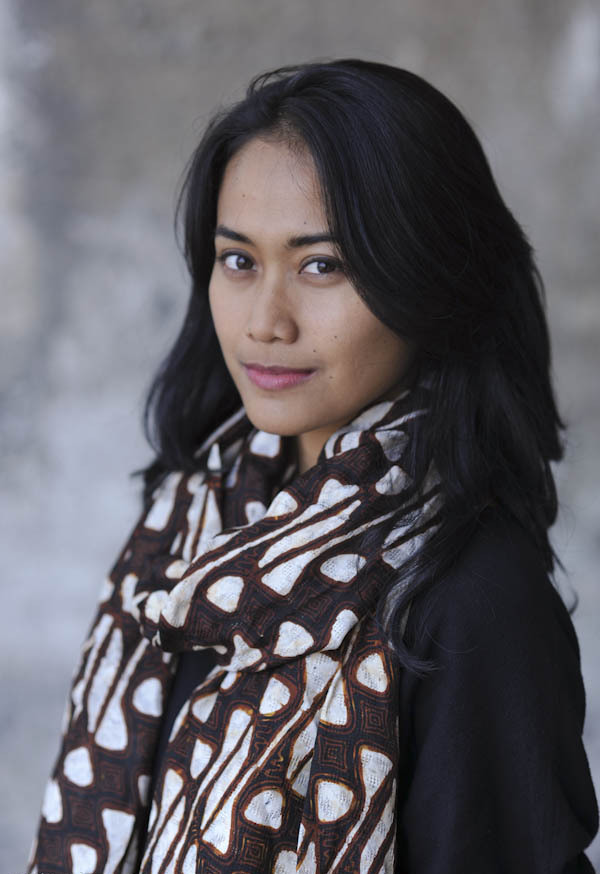
- Ayudya in 2016
- Born: Annisa Putri Ayudya; 20 May 1988 (age 37); Jakarta, Indonesia
- Occupations: Actress; presenter; model; lecturer; intimacy coordinator
- Years active: 2005–present

Annisa Putri Ayudya (born 20 May 1988) is an Indonesian actress. She made her feature film acting debut in Garin Nugroho's biographical drama film Guru Bangsa: Tjokroaminoto (2015). She received two Citra Awards nominations for Best Actress for her performance in Kafir: A Deal with the Devil (2018) and Homecoming (2019).

== Career ==
In 2004, Ayudya became the finalist of Cosmo Girl! Faces, a modelling competition held by teen magazine CosmoGirl! Indonesia. She started her acting career by starring in a soap opera 1001 Cara Menggaet Cowok in 2005. In October 2007, during her studies at the Faculty of Psychology at University of Indonesia, she founded the theatre club, Teater Psikologi. In 2008, she became the finalist of Wajah Femina, a modelling competition held by Indonesian magazine Femina. Ayudya represented the province of DKI Jakarta 2 and placed in the Top 10 of Puteri Indonesia 2011. She made her first feature film acting in Garin Nugroho's biographical drama film Guru Bangsa: Tjokroaminoto as Soehasikin, Tjokroaminoto's wife.

She is a permanent lecturer at the SAE Indonesia in the Film and Television Production program. She became the first licensed intimacy coordinator in Indonesia.

== Filmography ==
=== Film ===
Year	Title	Role	Notes
2015	Guru Bangsa: Tjokroaminoto	Soeharsikin	
2016	Bangkit!	Indri	
2016	Pinky Promise		
2016	Wonderful Life	Aqil's teacher	
2016	Mengejar Embun ke Eropa	Dra. Ani	
2017	Flutter Echoes and Notes Concerning Nature	Herself	Documentary
2017	Wage	Roekiyem	
2018	Kenapa Harus Bule?	Pipin Kartika	
2018	Kafir: A Deal with the Devil	Sri	
2018	Petualangan Menangkap Petir	Beth	
2018	Dongeng Mistis	Ambar	Segment: "Bajang"
2019	Down Swan	Mitha	
2019	Gundala	Indira Rahayu	
2019	Boundless Love	Nova	
2019	Love for Sale 2	Maya	
2019	The Queen of Black Magic	Murni	
2019	Homecoming	Aida	
2020	The East	Mira	
2021	Serigala Langit	Rina	
2021	Yowis Ben 3	Rini	
2021	Yowis Ben Finale	Rini	
2021	Menunggu Bunda	Yenny	
2021	Preman	Mayang	
2022	Tuhan Minta Duit	Mbah Kedah	
2022	Bukan Cinderella	Adam's mother	
2022	Pamali	Rika Retnosari	
2022	Qorin	Umi Yana	
2022	Sound from the Sea	Sri	
2022	Tumbal Kanjeng Iblis	Rosa	
2023	High School Serenade	Ayu Sastroatmodjo	
2023	Losmen Melati	Dara	
2023	Today We'll Talk About That Day	Pingkan	
2023	Perjamuan Iblis	Kala Nirmala	
2023	13 Bombs in Jakarta	Karin Anjani	
2024	The Devil's Lair	Sitaresmi Paratrika / Mbah Sarap	
2024	The Train of Death	Ramla	
2024	Kuyang	Mina Uwe	
2024	Grave Torture	Umaya Rahma	
2024	Two Blue Hearts	Inti Mardhika	
2024	Heartbreak Motel	Herself	
2024	Father's Haunted House	Ibu Joko	
2024	Petak Umpet	Masayu	
2024	Terkutuk	Maya	

=== Television ===
Year	Title	Role	Network	Notes
2005	1001 Cara Menggaet Cowok	Nadia	Global TV	
2015–2016	Kisah Carlo	Maya	YouTube	
2019–2020	Tunnel	Ambarwati Kusuma	GoPlay	
2020	Yowis Ben the Series	Rini	WeTV	
2021	Daur Hidup	Yayas	Vision+	Episode: "Rumah"
2022	Pulang	Nungky	Vidio	
2022	Cinta di Balik Awan	Mami Cui	Vision+	
2023	Jurnal Risa	Fitri	Disney+ Hotstar	
2024	Joko Anwar's Nightmares and Daydreams	Naya	Netflix	Episode: "Old House"
