= Susi Susanti: Love All =

- Theatrical release poster
- Directed by: Sim F
- Screenplay by: Raditya; Raymond Lee; Daud Sumolang; Sinar Ayu Massie
- Story by: Syarika Bralini
- Produced by: Daniel Mananta; Reza Hidayat; Guillaume Catala
- Starring: Laura Basuki; Dion Wiyoko
- Cinematography: Yunus Pasolang
- Edited by: Robby Barus; Arifin Cu'unk; Shiran Amir; Cody Miller
- Music by: Aghi Narottama; Bemby Gusti; Tony Merle
- Production companies: Time International Films; Damn! I Love Indonesia Movies; Oreima Films; East West Synergy; Melon Indonesia; Buddy Buddy Pictures
- Distributed by: Disney+ Hotstar
- Release date: 24 October 2019
- Running time: 96 minutes
- Country: Indonesia
- Language: Indonesian
- Box office: Rp 7.6 billion ($533,502)

Susi Susanti: Love All is a 2019 Indonesian biographical film about Susi Susanti, badminton athlete who won the first gold medal for Indonesia at the 1992 Summer Olympics. The film was directed by Sim F in his directorial debut. The film stars Laura Basuki as Susanti and Dion Wiyoko as Alan Budikusuma.

The film was theatrically released on 24 October 2019. For her portrayal of Susanti, Basuki won the Citra Award for Best Actress, the film's only win out of thirteen nominations it received at the ceremony.

== Premise ==
Susi Susanti: Love All tells about the life of Susi Susanti from her childhood until her retirement, including her life during May 1998 riots of Indonesia, her citizenship and her relationship with Alan Budikusuma.

== Cast ==
- Laura Basuki as Susi Susanti
- Moira Tabina Zayn as teenage Susi Susanti
- Dion Wiyoko as Alan Budikusuma
- Jenny Chang as Liang Chiu Sia
- Chew Kin Wah as Tong Sin Fu
- Lukman Sardi as MF Siregar
- Farhan as Try Sutrisno, general chairman of Badminton Association of Indonesia
- Rafael Tan as Hermawan Susanto
- Kelly Tandiono as Sarwendah Kusumawardhani
- Delon Thamrin as Rudy Gunawan, Susanti's older brother
- Nathaniel Sulistyo as Ardy Wiranata
- Iszur Muchtar as Risad Haditono, Susanti's father
- Dayu Wijanto as Purwa Benowati, Susanti's mother
- Kristo Immanuel as Suharto (voice)

== Production ==
The idea of the film was conceived after producer Daniel Mananta had a conversation with Susanti in a show, then he was interested to adapt her life story into a film. Susanti revealed that once a production company approached to do so, but the project had never realized.

The production of the film started in 2016, then director Sim F joined in mid-2017 to develop the screenplay. Susanti also contributed during the production by providing properties, such as medals, trophies, and photos. Basuki and Wiyoko were trained for five months under an athlete's treatment by Susanti's then-coach, Liang Chu Sia.

Principal photography began in August 2018. The filming took place in the actual locations around Tasikmalaya, Pangandaran, and Jakarta.

== Release ==
Susi Susanti: Love All was theatrically released on 24 October 2019. The film garnered 190,241 moviegoers during its run and grossed Rp 7.6 billion ($533,502). Disney+ Hotstar acquired the distribution rights to the film, releasing it on 1 January 2021.

The film was screened at the 2021 Beijing International Film Festival.

== Accolades ==
Award	Date	Category	Recipient	Result	Ref.
Film Pilihan Tempo	16 December 2019	Best Actress	Laura Basuki	Won	
Maya Awards	8 February 2020	Best Directorial Debut Film	Sim F	Nominated	
Maya Awards	8 February 2020	Best Actress	Laura Basuki	Nominated	
Maya Awards	8 February 2020	Best Children/Teen Actress/Actor	Moira Tabina Zayn	Nominated	
Maya Awards	8 February 2020	Best Costume Design	Nuni Triani	Nominated	
Indonesian Movie Actors Awards	25 July 2020	Favorite Film	Time International Films, Damn! I Love Indonesian Movies, Oreima Films, and East West Synergy	Nominated	
Indonesian Movie Actors Awards	25 July 2020	Best/Favorite Actress	Laura Basuki	Best	
Indonesian Movie Actors Awards	25 July 2020	Best/Favorite Supporting Actor	Lukman Sardi	Nominated	
Indonesian Movie Actors Awards	25 July 2020	Best Children Actor/Actress	Moira Tabina Zayn	Nominated	
Bandung Film Festival	14 November 2020	Best Actress	Laura Basuki	Nominated	
Bandung Film Festival	14 November 2020	Best Cinematography	Yunus Pasolang	Nominated	
Citra Awards	5 December 2020	Best Picture	Daniel Mananta, Reza Hidayat, and Guillaume Catala	Nominated	
Citra Awards	5 December 2020	Best Director	Sim F.	Nominated	
Citra Awards	5 December 2020	Best Actor	Dion Wiyoko	Nominated	
Citra Awards	5 December 2020	Best Actress	Laura Basuki	Won	
Citra Awards	5 December 2020	Best Supporting Actor	Iszur Muchtar	Nominated	
Citra Awards	5 December 2020	Best Original Screenplay	Syafira Bralini, Raditya, Daud Sumolang, Sinar Ayu Massie, and Raymond Lee	Nominated	
Citra Awards	5 December 2020	Best Cinematography	Yunus Pasolang	Nominated	
Citra Awards	5 December 2020	Best Production Design	Frans XR Paat	Nominated	
Citra Awards	5 December 2020	Best Sound	Mohamad Ikhsan and Trisno	Nominated	
Citra Awards	5 December 2020	Best Original Score	Aghi Narottama and Bemby Gusti	Nominated	
Citra Awards	5 December 2020	Best Costume Design	Nuni Triani	Nominated	
Citra Awards	5 December 2020	Best Makeup and Hairstyling	Eba Sheba	Nominated	
Citra Awards	5 December 2020	Best Visual Effects	Satrya Mahardhika, Wahyu Ponco, Ardian Krisna Wijaya, and Stephen Kingsyah	Nominated	
