= Preman (film) =

- Poster
- Directed by: Randolph Zaini
- Screenplay by: Randolph Zaini
- Produced by: Ryan Ricardo; Randolph Zaini
- Starring: Khiva Iskak; Farell Akbar; Muzakki Ramdhan; Kiki Narendra; Salvita Decorte; Revaldo; Putri Ayudya; Emil Kusumo; Gilbert Pattiruhu
- Cinematography: Xing-Mai Deng
- Edited by: Avi Glick
- Music by: Elwin Hendrijanto
- Production company: Introversey
- Release date: 8 April 2021 (SIFF)
- Running time: 92 minutes
- Country: Indonesia
- Language: Indonesian

Preman is a 2021 Indonesian action film, directed, co-produced and written by Randolph Zaini in his directorial debut. The film stars Khiva Iskak and Muzzaki Ramdhan. The film had its world premiere at the 2021 Seattle International Film Festival.

== Premise ==
A deaf criminal with a traumatic past and his son must fight their way out of their small village after witnessing a horrible murder.

== Cast ==
- Khiva Iskak as Sandi
- Farell Akbar as little Sandi
- Muzakki Ramdhan as Pandu
- Kiki Narendra as Guru
- Salvita Decorte as Cherry
- Revaldo as Ramon
- Putri Ayudya as Mayang
- Khayla Maharanie as little Mayang
- Gilbert Pattiruhu as Komandan
- Egi Fedly as Pak Haji
- Paul Agusta as Paul
- Tebe Ali as Irfan
- Emil Kusumo as Bang bang
- Jenny Zhang as Ching Ching
- Jourdy Pranata as Joko
- David Saragih as Hanoeng

== Release ==
Preman had its world premiere at the 2021 Seattle International Film Festival. During its run, the film screened at the Shanghai International Film Festival and Fantastic Fest.

== Accolades ==
Award	Date	Category	Recipient	Result	Ref.
Indonesian Film Festival	10 November 2021	Best Picture	Randolph Zaini and Ryan Ricardo	Nominated	
Indonesian Film Festival	10 November 2021	Best Director	Randolph Zaini	Nominated	
Indonesian Film Festival	10 November 2021	Best Actor	Khiva Iskak	Nominated	
Indonesian Film Festival	10 November 2021	Best Supporting Actor	Kiki Narendra	Nominated	
Indonesian Film Festival	10 November 2021	Best Supporting Actor	Muzakki Ramdhan	Nominated	
Indonesian Film Festival	10 November 2021	Best Visual Effects	Bintang Adi Pradana	Won	
Indonesian Film Festival	10 November 2021	Best Makeup and Hairstyling	Novie Ariyanti	Won	
Film Pilihan Tempo	20 December 2021	Film Pilihan Tempo	Preman	Nominated	
Film Pilihan Tempo	20 December 2021	Best Director	Randolph Zaini	Nominated	
Film Pilihan Tempo	20 December 2021	Best Screenplay	Randolph Zaini	Nominated	
Film Pilihan Tempo	20 December 2021	Best Actor	Khiva Iskak	Won	
Film Pilihan Tempo	20 December 2021	Best Supporting Actor	Muzakki Ramdhan	Nominated	
