= The Queen of Black Magic =

2019 Indonesian supernatural horror film

- Film poster
- Ratu Ilmu Hitam
- Directed by: Kimo Stamboel
- Screenplay by: Joko Anwar
- Story by: Ratu Ilmu Hitam by Subagio Samtani
- Produced by: Gope T. Samtani
- Starring: Ario Bayu; Hannah Al Rashid; Adhisty Zara; Muzakki Ramdhan; Ari Irham; Ade Firman Hakim; Putri Ayudya; Yayu A.W. Unru; Ruth Marini
- Cinematography: Patrick Tashadian
- Edited by: Arifin Cu'unk
- Music by: Fajar Yuskemal; Yudhi Arfani
- Production companies: Rapi Films; Screenplay Films
- Distributed by: Screenplay Films; Golden Screen Cinemas (Malaysia); Cathay-Keris Films/mm2 Entertainment (Singapore); Garage Play (Taiwan); Shudder (United States)
- Release date: November 7, 2019
- Running time: 99 minutes
- Country: Indonesia
- Language: Indonesian
- Box office: $2.8 million

The Queen of Black Magic (Indonesian: Ratu Ilmu Hitam) is a 2019 Indonesian supernatural horror film directed by Kimo Stamboel and written by Joko Anwar. The film is a loose remake of the 1981 Indonesian horror film of the same name also produced by Rapi Films. It stars Ario Bayu, Hannah Al Rashid, Adhisty Zara, Ade Firman Hakim, Muzakki Ramdhan, and Ari Irham. Hakim received a posthumous Citra Award for Best Supporting Actor for his performance in the film.

== Plot ==
Hanif, Nadya, and children Sandi, Dina, and Haqi are travelling to Hanif's old orphanage to see Pak Bandi, his bedridden former caretaker. Hanif runs over something but only finds a deer, not noticing a young bloodied girl lying in an unseen trench. The family are met at the orphanage by Hanif's childhood friends Anton and Jefri, their wives Eva and Lina respectively, as well as Maman and Siti, who are now caretakers. Except for older children Hasbi and Rani, the place is empty as the others are still on a bus trip. When checking the children into their rooms, Hasbi mocks Rani, who was left at the orphanage by her mother but is sure she will return. After Haqi inquires about a locked door, Rani tells him about the clubfooted Ibu Mirah, a caretaker who went insane claiming that a runaway girl named Murni had been spirited by a demon. Thinking Ibu Mirah had killed Murni, they locked her in that room until she died.

Fearing he ran over a person, Hanif takes Jefri to the collision site, where they find the girl and the bus carrying dead orphanage children. They place the girl in Hanif's trunk. Anton investigates the bus en route to the police and gets killed by black magic, while at the orphanage, Lina and Eva get possessed into self-mutilation. Nadya drives them to the hospital with the adults but keeps going in circles, reminding Jefri that the same thing happened when he, Anton, and Hanif tried to escape after being told Ibu Mirah had immolated three girls with black magic. It is revealed that they were instructed by Pak Bandi to bury Ibu Mirah in the now locked room. They drive back.

Nadya finds under Pak Bandi's bed inappropriate photos of orphanage girls, including Siti, leading them to suspect her of practising black magic to exact revenge. Siti swears innocence but confirms that Pak Bandi molested every girl and was the one who burned the three girls as warning. Ibu Mirah resorted to black magic to protect the girls and kill Pak Bandi, but died before succeeding. The girl in Hanif's trunk, Mustika, wakes up. She reveals that the bus was intercepted by a woman who jinxed everyone to death, but Mustika was unaffected because she did not hear the spell through her headphones; she ran out but was hit by Hanif's car. Hanif deduces that this woman was the vengeful Murni, who, unlike in Rani's story, is in fact Ibu Mirah's biological daughter.

Murni appears and punishes them with hellish torture, because, although they did her no harm, their ignorance of her family ordeal "is also a sin". Therefore, they must feel what she felt when her family died. Aided by Rani, who is implied to be her daughter, Murni gives Nadya a choice: kill Hanif or her children die. Haqi stabs Murni from behind and Nadya decapitates her. Murni reattaches her head but gets immolated by Nadya and stumbles into the incapacitated Pak Bandi. Nadya and her family escape.

In the epilogue, Nadya sees a brief apparition of Murni when picking up Haqi from school. Meanwhile, in the now sold orphanage building, sounds of Ibu Mirah's clubbed foot echo in its halls.

== Cast ==
- Ario Bayu as Hanif
  - Trizki Nabil Rahman as young Hanif
- Hannah Al Rashid as Nadya
- Adhisty Zara as Dina
- Muzakki Ramdhan as Haqi
- Ari Irham as Sandi
- Ade Firman Hakim as Maman
  - Akbar Muhammad as young Maman
- Sheila Dara Aisha as Siti
  - Callystha Zahra Syaumi as young Siti
- Tanta Ginting as Anton
  - Nathan Arsheva Syarif as young Anton
- Miller Khan as Jefri
  - Farell Akbar as young Jefri
- Imelda Therinne as Eva
- Salvita Decorte as Lina
- Shenina Cinnamon as Rani
- Yayu A.W. Unru as Pak Bandi
- Ruth Marini as Ms. Mirah
- Gisellma Firmansyah as Mustika
- Putri Ayudya as Murni
  - Khayla Maharani as young Murni

== Production ==
=== Development ===
The film is a loose remake of the 1981 Indonesian horror classic of the same name by Citra Award-winning director Imam Tantowi based on a screenplay by Subagio Samtani and starring Suzzanna. Joko Anwar named the 1981 feature as one of his favorite Indonesian films and that when approached to write the screenplay, he "did not have to think twice". Anwar developed a new story while keeping the core elements of black magic and vengeance.

The success of Anwar's 2017 Satan's Slaves, also a loose remake of a horror film in Rapi Films catalogue, inspired executive producer Sunil Samtani to explore the possibility of reinventing another one of his studio's horror classic. The film's budget was estimated to be over Rp 10 billion, with 60% going into production cost and the remaining 40% used for marketing.

=== Filming ===
The film was shot in 24 days in Cirebon, West Java, Indonesia with over 100 crew members involved.

=== Post-production ===
Some of the film's scenes employed CGI effects done by four different teams in three months. Samtani stated that the CGI process was the most challenging stage of the production as they "wanted to up the level of terror".

== Release ==
The Queen of Black Magic premiered on November 7, 2019 in Indonesia. In North America, it was released on Shudder as part of its original programming on January 28, 2021.

== Reception ==
=== Box office ===
After 11 days of wide release, The Queen of Black Magic garnered over 700 thousand admissions. At the end of its domestic theatrical run, it ended up with 907,386 admissions, making it the fourteenth highest grossing domestic film in 2019.

=== Critical response ===
On review aggregator Rotten Tomatoes, the film holds a 90% score based on 48 reviews. The site's consensus states: "The Queen of Black Magic mixes buried trauma with supernatural horror to produce a dark blend that genre fans will savor." On Metacritic, it has an average score of 54 based on 5 reviews, indicating mixed critical reception.

Simon Abrams of RogerEbert.com gave the film 2.5 stars in a mixed review, noting that "The movie's whodunit-style story is thankfully compelling enough to keep things moving along" but criticized the film's depiction of violence, calling it "upsetting because it's impossible to understand." Meagan Navarro of Bloody Disgusting also gave a mixed review, writing that the film "may not reinvent the wheel, but it does offer a ton of squeamish fun."

Dan Stubbs of NME was more positive, giving the film 4 out of 5 stars and compared the film favorably to Sam Raimi's Evil Dead film series. Noting the involvement of Anwar, who released his folk horror film Impetigore only a few weeks before The Queen of Black Magic, Stubbs commented that the film "[i]s not as clever as Impetigore, for sure–but it's a hell of a ride." Comparing the film to its 1981 source material, Marshall Estes of The Spool felt that the film is "more palatable to a global audience" but criticized the film' as "lack[ing] a clear protagonist."
