= Mountain Song (film) =

- Directed by: Yusuf Radjamuda
- Written by: Yusuf Radjamuda
- Produced by: Rahmadiyah Tria Gayathri; Ifa Isfansyah; Kamila Andini; Eddie Cahyono
- Starring: Alqusyairi Radjamuda; Laramputi Radjamuda; Ferdamayan; Sado Toringulu
- Cinematography: Ujel Bausad
- Edited by: Yusuf Radjamuda; Taufiqqurahman
- Music by: Umariyadi; Tangkilisan
- Production companies: Fourcolours Films; Halaman Belakang Films; ReelOne Project
- Release date: 17 June 2019 (SIFF)
- Running time: 76 minutes
- Country: Indonesia
- Language: Indonesian

Mountain Song is a 2019 Indonesian drama film, directed and written by Yusuf Radjamuda in his feature-length directorial debut. The film stars Radjamuda's son, Alqusyairi Radjamuda as Gimba.

The film had its world premiere at the 2019 Shanghai International Film Festival. The film was nominated for three Citra Awards in 2020: Best Cinematography, Best Original Screenplay, and Best Actor (A. Radjamuda). At age 6, A. Radjamuda became the youngest Best Actor and acting nominee in history.

== Premise ==
After the death of his father, Gimba sticks with his mother whose health is getting worse. They live in a remote village in the mountains of Pipikoro, South Sulawesi and has a difficult access to lowland. Then, his mother teaches Gimba a song which, is supposedly said, can bring tranquility and happiness. On their way, Gimba meets Lara, a mysterious girl his age.

== Cast ==
- Alqusyairi Radjamuda as Gimba
- Laramputi Radjamuda
- Ferdamayan
- Sado Toringulu

== Production ==
In an interview with Lokadata, Radjamuda revealed that the idea of Mountain Song was conceived based on the lives of people in Pipikoro, where the access to the lowland was difficult and some patients lost their lives during their way to the hospital in the city.

== Release ==
Mountain Song had its world premiere at the 2019 Shanghai International Film Festival, where it won the Asian New Talent Award for Best Scriptwriter. The film was also screened at the 2019 World Cinema Amsterdam and 2020 Asian Film Festival in Rome, Italy.

== Accolades ==
Award	Date	Category	Recipient	Result	Ref.
Shanghai International Film Festival	21 June 2019	Asian New Talent Award: Best Director	Yusuf Radjamuda	Nominated	
Shanghai International Film Festival	21 June 2019	Asian New Talent Award: Best Screenplay	Yusuf Radjamuda	Won	
Citra Awards	5 December 2020	Best Actor	Alqusyairi Radjamuda	Nominated	
Citra Awards	5 December 2020	Best Original Screenplay	Yusuf Radjamuda	Nominated	
Citra Awards	5 December 2020	Best Cinematography	Ujel Bausad	Nominated	
