= Paramitha Rusady =

Indonesian actress, singer and presenter

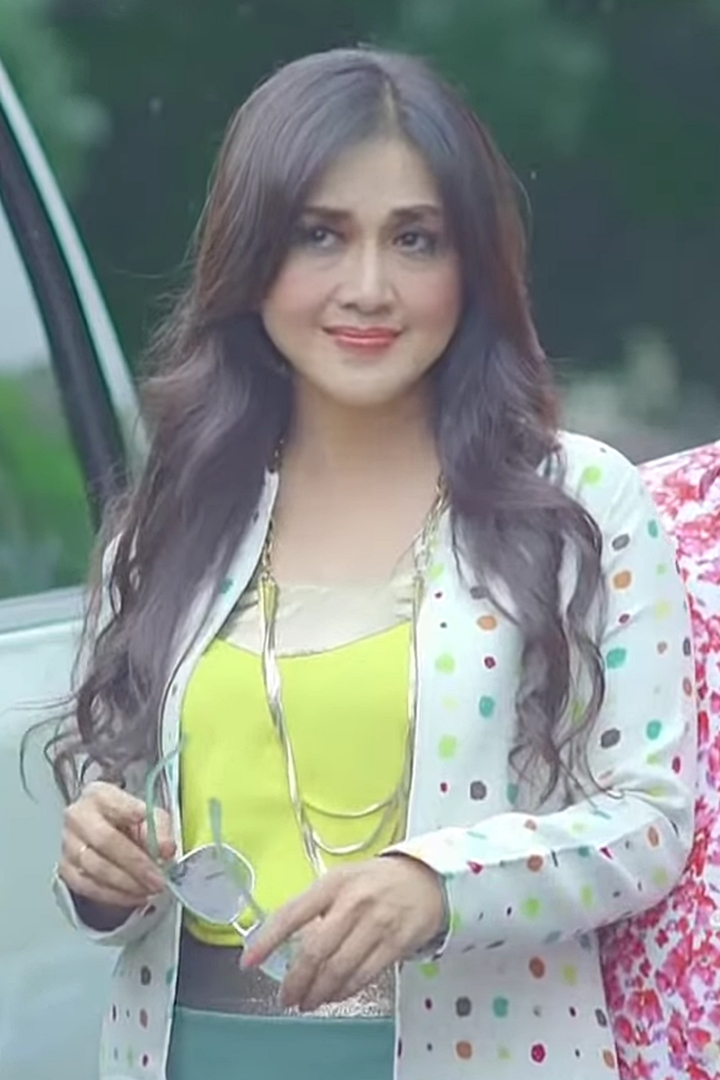
- Born: Pradnya Paramitha Chandra Devy Rusady; August 11, 1966 (age 60); Makassar, South Sulawesi, Indonesia
- Occupations: Celebrity; Singer; Presenter
- Musical career
- Genre: Pop
- Instruments: Vocal; Guitar
- Labels: Billboard; Blackboard
- Formerly of: Tiga Dara

Pradnya Paramitha Chandra Devy Rusady (born August 11, 1966, in Makassar, South Sulawesi, Indonesia) is an Indonesian actress, singer and presenter of Sundanese descent.

== Career ==
She was born in Makassar, August 11, 1966. Her parents are Raden Mas Yus Rusady Wirahaditenaya (1925–2017) and Raden Ayu Mary Zumarya (1924–1981), a dance teacher.

Rusady has worked as a model and singer, as well as an actress in films and soap operas. In her youth, she starred in the romance movie Ranjau-Ranjau Cinta, along with Rano Karno. She appeared in the documentary Dibawah Nyiur Melambai and in Si Kabayan, paired with Didi Petet. After a long hiatus, she returned to acting in 2011, appearing in the soap opera Anugerah.

As a teenager she played musical instruments and wrote a number of songs. In 2009 she released the single "Bulan Ke Tiga".

== Personal life ==
On June 23, 2000, she married Gunawan, a soap opera actor who was seven years younger than her. They divorced in October 2002 without having children. On May 20, 2004, she married Nenad Bago of Croatia. He changed his name to Muhammad Hamzah Akbar after converting to Islam. They have one son, and divorced in 2012.

== Discography ==
=== Studio albums ===
- Jatuh Hati (1988)
- Nona Manis (3 Dara; with Ita Purnamasari and Sylvana Herman) (1990)
- Malam Minggu (3 Dara; with Ita Purnamasari and Sylvana Herman) (1991)
- Tanpa Dirimu (1991)
- Hanya Cinta (3 Dara; with Ita Purnamasari and Sylvana Herman) (1993)
- Tiada Lagi Asmara (1994)
- Sakral Cinta (2000)
- Best of the Best Paramitha Rusady (2003)
- Part of Your World – EP (2018)

=== Compilation albums ===
- Datang Kembali (1992)
- Jangan Ada Air Mata (1996)
- Kidung (3 Bidadari; with Desy Ratnasari and Yuni Shara) (1999)

=== Soundtrack albums ===
- Merpati Tak Pernah Ingkar Janji (Original Motion Picture Soundtrack; with Adi Bing Slamet) (1986)
- Janjiku (Original Television Series Soundtrack) (1997)
- Karmila (Original Television Series Soundtrack) (1998)

== Filmography ==
=== Film ===
Year	Title	Role	Notes
1984	Ranjau-Ranjau Cinta	Mimi	Lead role
1985	Romantika	Tia/Mutiara Sanusi	Lead role
1985	Kidung Cinta	Zein	Lead role
1986	Secawan Anggur Kebimbangan		Supporting role
1986	Merpati Tak Pernah Ingkar Janji	Maria	Lead role
1986	Ketika Musim Semi Tiba	Ma Icih	Lead role
1986	Didadaku Ada Cinta	Marita Cendrawasih	Lead role
1987	Aku Benci Kamu	Uun	Lead role
1988	Namaku Joe	Fia	Lead role
1988	Cinta Anak Jaman	Heidy	Lead role
1989	Makelar Kodok	Fifi	Lead role
1989	Si Kabayan Saba Kota	Nyi Iteung	Lead role Nominated – 1989 Indonesian Film Festival for Best Leading Actress; Won – 1989 Bandung Film Festival for Best Leading Actress
1989	Si Kabayan dan Gadis Kota	Nyi Iteung	Lead role
1989	Lebih Asyik Sama Kamu	Indriani	Lead role
1990	Blok M	Cindy	Supporting role Nominated – 1990 Indonesian Film Festival for Best Supporting Actress
1990	Makelar Kodok Untung Besar	Freza	Supporting role
1990	Dua Kekasih	Rieke	Lead role
1990	Boleh-Boleh Aja	Vina	Lead role
1990	Boss Carmad	Sutirah	Lead role Nominated – 1991 Indonesian Film Festival for Best Leading Actress
1990	Pagar Ayu	Ika	Lead role
1990	Lupus IV: Anak Mami Sudah Besar	Pia	Lead role
1990	Catatan Si Boy IV	Cindy	Supporting role
1991	Catatan Si Boy V	Cindy	Supporting role
1991	Pesta	Wendy	Lead role
1992	Kuberikan Segalanya	Fitri	Supporting role Nominated – 1989 Indonesian Film Festival for Best Supporting Actress
1992	Selembut Wajah Anggun	Anggun	Lead role Nominated – 1992 Indonesian Film Festival for Best Leading Actress
2012	Ummi Aminah	Zarika	Supporting role Nominated – 2012 Bandung Film Festival for Best Female Supporting Role
2016	My Journey: Mencari Mata Air	Maya	Supporting role
2016	Untuk Angeline	Mrs. Dewi	Supporting role
2022	Nariti, Romansa Danau Toba	Sarma Damanik	Supporting role

=== Television ===
Year	Title	Role	Notes	Network
1974–1979	Ci Luk Baa	Herself	Presenter	
1982–1987	Akuarium	Herself	Presenter	
1987–1989	Capcom TV	Herself	Presenter	
1993	None	Mitha/Lolo	Supporting role	TPI
1993–1994	Hati Seluas Samudera	Mirna	Lead role	RCTI
1994–1996	Untukmu Segalanya	Sandra	Lead role	RCTI
1995	Simphony Dua Hati	Sonia	Lead role	RCTI
1995–1996	Halimun		Lead role	RCTI
1996	Aku Bersujud		Lead role Nominated – 1997 Festival Sinetron Indonesia for Best Female Leading Role	RCTI
1997	Janjiku	Laras/Nada	Lead role Won – 1997 Panasonic Awards for Favorite Actress; Won – 1997 Panasonic Awards for Favorite Drama Series Program	RCTI
1998	Karmila	Doctor Karmila	Lead role Won – 1998 Panasonic Awards for Favorite Actress; Won – 1998 Panasonic Awards for Favorite Drama Series Program	Indosiar
1998–2000	Edu Games vs. CAPCOM	Herself	Presenter	
1998–1999	Jangan Rebut Suamiku	Sinta	Lead role	Indosiar
1998–1999	Permataku	Annisa	Lead role Nominated – 1999 Panasonic Awards for Favorite Actress	RCTI
1999–2000	Wajah Penuh Cinta	Astrid	Lead role	RCTI
2000	Kau Bukan Milikku		Lead role	Indosiar
2000–2001	Berikan Aku Cinta	Amara	Lead Role	Indosiar
2000–2001	Cinta Tak Pernah Salah	Paramita	Lead role Nominated – 2000 Panasonic Awards for Favorite Actress	RCTI
2001	Maha Pengasih	Sinta	Lead Role	SCTV
2001–2004	Alam Fantasi	Herself	Presenter	
2001–2002	Kesetiaan Bidadari	Bidadari	Lead Role	Trans TV
2002–2003	Jangan Ambil Nyawaku	Non	Lead Role	Trans 7
2003	Bagito			ANTV
2004–2005	Siapa Paling Pintar?	Herself	Presenter	Trans TV
2005	Hidayah		Episode: "Janda Soleha Berhati Emas"	Trans TV
2005	Pintu Hidayah		Episode: "Surga Ditelapak Kaki Ibu"	RCTI
2006	Iman			SCTV
2006	Turun Ranjang	Dian	Lead role	Indosiar
2006	Maha Kasih		Episode: "Ingin Punya Anak"	RCTI
2006	Ibu Pertiwi	Pertiwi	Lead Role	RCTI
2006	Do'a		Episode: "Do'a Ibu"	Indosiar
2006–2007	Biar Cinta Bicara		Lead role	Indosiar
2007	Istri Kedua	Yeni		TPI
2010–2011	Dia Anakku	Maya	Supporting role	Indosiar
2010–2011	Putri yang Ditukar	Mayang	Supporting role	RCTI
2011–2012	Anugerah	Runia	Supporting role	RCTI
2012	Karunia	Amara	Supporting role	RCTI
2012–2013	Kutunggu Kau di Pasar Minggu	Mrs. Sari	Supporting role	RCTI
2013	Jodohku	Lestari	Supporting role	RCTI
2016	Surga Yang Kedua	Mrs. Shania	Supporting role Won – 2016 SCTV Awards for Most Famous Supporting Actress	SCTV
2016	OK-JEK	Herself	Guest role (Episode 18)	NET.
2018	The East	Ratih (Bima's Mother)	Guest role	NET.
2019	Fitri	Fitri	Lead role	ANTV

=== Television film ===
Year	Title	Role	Notes	Network
2002	Calon Menantu vs Calon Mertua	Marfuah	Lead role	SCTV
2005	Ketabahan Nurlela	Nurlela	Lead role	
2009	Kado Terindah			
2011	Asal Mula Selat Bali			
2013	Ketika Bung di Ende	Inggit Ganarsih	Lead role	TVRI
2022	Januari di Bulan Desember	Januari	Lead role	TVRI

== Awards and nominations ==
Year	Awards	Category	Recipients	Result
1989	Indonesian Film Festival	Citra Award for Best Leading Actress	Si Kabayan Saba Kota	Nominated
1990	Indonesian Film Festival	Citra Award for Best Supporting Actress	Blok M	Nominated
1991	Indonesian Film Festival	Citra Award for Best Leading Actress	Boss Carmad	Nominated
1992	Indonesian Film Festival	Citra Award for Best Leading Actress	Selembut Wajah Anggun	Nominated
1992	Indonesian Film Festival	Citra Award for Best Supporting Actress	Kuberikan Segalanya	Nominated
1997	Festival Sinetron Indonesia	Best Female Leading Role	Ku Bersujud	Nominated
1997	Panasonic Awards	Favorite Actress	Janjiku	Won
1998	Panasonic Awards	Favorite Actress	Karmila	Won
1999	Panasonic Awards	Favorite Actress	Permataku	Nominated
2000	Panasonic Awards	Favorite Actress	Cinta Tak Pernah Salah	Nominated
2000	C&R Magazine	Choice Artist	Paramitha Rusady	#2
2012	Festival Film Bandung	Best Female Supporting Role	Ummi Aminah	Nominated
2016	SCTV Awards	Most Famous Supporting Actress	Surga Yang Kedua	Won
2017	Seleb On News Awards	Most Hits Senior Celeb	Paramitha Rusady	Nominated
