= Imperfect (2019 film) =

- Promotional release poster
- Indonesian: Imperfect: Karier, Cinta & Timbangan
- Directed by: Ernest Prakasa
- Screenplay by: Meira Anastasia; Ernest Prakasa
- Based on: Imperfect: A Journey to Self-Acceptance by Meira Anastasia
- Produced by: Chand Parwez Servia; Fiaz Servia
- Starring: Jessica Mila; Reza Rahadian
- Cinematography: Anggi Frisca
- Edited by: Ryan Purwoko
- Music by: Ifa Fachir; Dimas Wibisana
- Production company: Starvision
- Release date: 19 December 2019
- Running time: 113 minutes
- Country: Indonesia
- Language: Indonesian
- Box office: Rp 106.5 billion ($7.46 million)

Imperfect (subtitled Karier, Cinta & Timbangan in Indonesia; lit. Imperfect: Career, Love & Scales) is a 2019 Indonesian drama film directed and co-written by Ernest Prakasa. Based on the novel Imperfect: A Journey to Self-Acceptance written by Meira Anastasia, it was released on 19 December 2019.

== Premise ==
Rara, a messy and overweight research associate, lives in a world in which appearance matters. She orders her world by a close relationship with her boyfriend, Dika and his mother, also her best friend, Fey. Everything starts to change when she is promoted as the marketing manager, but is judged based on her appearance, deemed as "not presentable". Then, she decides to challenge her boss that she should be given the position if she manages to lose weight and change her appearance.

== Cast ==
- Jessica Mila as Rara
- Reza Rahadian as Dika
- Yasmin Napper as Lulu
- Karina Suwandi as Debby
- Shareefa Daanish as Fey
- Dion Wiyoko as Kelvin
- Boy William as George
- Clara Bernadeth as Marsha
- Dewi Irawan as Ratih
- Ernest Prakasa as Teddy

== Production ==
On 29 November 2018, Ernest Prakasa announced that he would adapt, his wife, Meira Anastasia's novel Imperfect: A Journey to Self-Acceptance into a film. He also revealed that the screenplay was mainly written by Anastasia. It was revealed on 20 June 2019 that Jessica Mila and Reza Rahadian were set to star in the film. Prakasa revealed that he had aimed for Rahadian to star in one of his films.

The filming was divided into two phases and started on 28 July 2019 in Jakarta, Bogor, Depok, Tangerang, and Bekasi.

== Release ==
The film was released nationwide on 19 December 2019. It garnered 127,038 moviegoers in the film's release date. It became the second most-watched Indonesian film of 2019 with 2,662,356 moviegoers.

== Accolades ==
Award	Date	Category	Recipient	Result	Ref.
Maya Awards	8 February 2020	Best Feature Film	Imperfect	Nominated	
Maya Awards	8 February 2020	Best Director	Ernest Prakasa	Nominated	
Maya Awards	8 February 2020	Best Actress	Jessica Mila	Nominated	
Maya Awards	8 February 2020	Best Supporting Actress	Dewi Irawan	Nominated	
Maya Awards	8 February 2020	Best Breakthrough Actress	Yasmin Napper	Nominated	
Maya Awards	8 February 2020	Best Breakthrough Actress	Kiky Saputri	Nominated	
Maya Awards	8 February 2020	Best Adapted Screenplay	Ernest Prakasa and Meira Anastasia	Won	
Maya Awards	8 February 2020	Best Original Song	"Pelukku Untuk Pelikmu" (Fiersa Besari)	Nominated	
Maya Awards	8 February 2020	Best Makeup and Hairstyling	Talia Subandrio	Won	
Citra Awards	5 December 2020	Best Picture	Chand Parwez and Fiaz Servia	Nominated	
Citra Awards	5 December 2020	Best Actor	Reza Rahadian	Nominated	
Citra Awards	5 December 2020	Best Actress	Jessica Mila	Nominated	
Citra Awards	5 December 2020	Best Supporting Actress	Dewi Irawan	Nominated	
Citra Awards	5 December 2020	Best Adapted Screenplay	Ernest Prakasa and Meira Anastasia	Won	
Citra Awards	5 December 2020	Best Original Score	Ifa Fachir and Dimas Wibisana	Nominated	
Citra Awards	5 December 2020	Best Original Song	"Tak Harus Sempurna" (Reza Rahadian and Ifa Fachir)	Nominated	
Citra Awards	5 December 2020	Best Sound	Syamsurrijal and Anhar Moha	Nominated	
Citra Awards	5 December 2020	Best Makeup	Talia Subandrio	Nominated	
Citra Awards	5 December 2020	Best Costume Design	Andhika Dharmapermana	Nominated	
Citra Awards	5 December 2020	Best Film Editing	Ryan Purwoko	Nominated	
