= Humba Dreams =

- Directed by: Riri Riza
- Written by: Riri Riza
- Produced by: Mira Lesmana
- Starring: JS Khairen; Ully Triani
- Cinematography: Bayu Prihantoro Filemon
- Edited by: Sastha Sunu
- Music by: Aksan Sjuman
- Production company: Miles Films
- Distributed by: Netflix
- Release date: 17 June 2019 (SIFF)
- Running time: 75 minutes
- Country: Indonesia
- Language: Indonesian
- Budget: €400,000

Humba Dreams is a 2019 Indonesian drama film written and directed by Riri Riza. It stars JS Khairen and Ully Triani. The film had its world premiere at the 2019 Shanghai International Film Festival.

At the 40th Citra Awards, the film received six nominations and won one.

== Premise ==
Martin, a young and restless film student in Jakarta, is called back home to his village in Sumba Island. Apparently, his late father left him an exposed roll of celluloid film. While finding ways to develop the footage, he embarks on a journey of self-discovery.

== Cast ==
- JS Khairen as Martin
- Ully Triani as Ana
- Ephy Pae as Jean Luc

== Production ==
The production of Humba Dreams was initiated by Riza and producer Mira Lesmana after discovering a photographic film studio during the filming of The Golden Cane Warrior in Sumba Island.

In 2017, the film received the CJ Entertainment Award at the Asian Project Market and was awarded $10,000 as the prize. Humba Dreams was also selected as one of the eight film projects, promoted by the Creative Economy Agency (Bekraf) in Cannes, helped out to receive production and distribution deals.

== Release ==
Humba Dreams had its world premiere at the 2019 Shanghai International Film Festival. The film is distributed in Indonesia through Netflix on 9 July 2020.

== Accolades ==
Award	Date	Category	Recipient	Result	Ref.
Maya Awards	8 February 2020	Best Independent Feature Film	Humba Dreams	Won	
Citra Awards	5 December 2020	Best Picture	Mira Lesmana	Nominated	
Citra Awards	5 December 2020	Best Director	Riri Riza	Nominated	
Citra Awards	5 December 2020	Best Actress	Ully Triani	Nominated	
Citra Awards	5 December 2020	Best Original Screenplay	Riri Riza	Nominated	
Citra Awards	5 December 2020	Best Original Score	Aksan Sjuman	Won	
Citra Awards	5 December 2020	Best Cinematography	Bayu Prihantoro	Nominated	
