= Crazy Awesome Teachers =

2020 Indonesian film

- Film poster
- Indonesian: Guru-Guru Gokil
- Directed by: Sammaria Simanjuntak
- Written by: Rahabi Mandra
- Produced by: Dian Sastrowardoyo; Shanty Harmayn; Tanya Yuson; Aoura Lovenson Chandra
- Starring: Gading Marten; Faradina Mufti; Boris Bokir; Dian Sastrowardoyo; Kevin Ardilova
- Cinematography: Muhammad Firdaus
- Edited by: Dinda Amanda
- Music by: Aghi Narottama; Bemby Gusti; Tony Merle
- Production company: Base Entertainment
- Distributed by: Netflix
- Release date: August 17, 2020
- Running time: 101 minutes
- Country: Indonesia
- Language: Indonesian

Crazy Awesome Teachers (Indonesian: Guru-Guru Gokil) is a 2020 Indonesian comedy drama film directed by Sammaria Simanjuntak, written by Rahabi Mandra, produced by Dian Sastrowardoyo and Tanya Yuson and starring Gading Marten, Boris Bokir and Kevin Ardilova.

== Cast ==
- Gading Marten as Taat Pribadi
- Boris Bokir as Nelson Manulang
- Kevin Ardilova as Ipang
- Dwiky Al Asyam as Tukang jahit
- Ibnu Jamil as Gagah
- Shakira Jasmine as Saulina
- Faradina Mufti as Rahayu
- Nikandro Mailangkay as Bimbim
- Dian Sastrowardoyo as Nirmala
- Arswendi Nasution as Purnama
- Asri Welas as Indah
- Kiki Narendra as Pak Le'

== Release ==
Crazy Awesome Teachers was released on August 17, 2020 on Netflix.
