= Nussa =

Indonesian muslim television series

YouTube information
- Channel: Nussa Official
- Years active: 2018–2021
- Genres: Children's; Animation; Islamic education
- Subscribers: 8.8 million
- Views: 2.5 billion
- Last updated: September 2022
- Website: www.nussaofficial.com

Nussa
- Genre: Animation
- Written by: Johanna DK
- Directed by: Bony Wirasmono
- Voices of: Muzakki Ramdhan; Aysha Razaana Ocean Fajar; Jessy Milianty; Malka Hayfa Asyari; Mahira Sausan Andi; Hamka Siregar; Dewi Sandra
- Country of origin: Indonesia
- Original language: Indonesian
- No. of seasons: 3
- No. of episodes: 74

Production
- Executive producers: Aditya Triantoro; Yuda Wirafianto
- Producer: Ricky MZC Manoppo
- Editors: Agung Mukti Nugrohi-ho; Nuraeni
- Running time: 4 minutes
- Production companies: The Little Giantz; 4Stripe Productions; Visinema Studios

Original release
- Network: YouTube
- Release: 20 November 2018 – 2021

Nussa is an Indonesian animated series, originally produced by The Little Giantz and 4Stripe Productions, and later Visinema Studios. The animation first aired on YouTube on 20 November 2018.

Nussa follows the daily lives and adventures of Nussa, a 9-year-old boy with his prosthetic leg, his 5-year-old sister Rarra, and their family and friends. Each episode centers on Islamic values. Nussa, his cat Anta, and Rarra's names are intended to reflect the word Nusantara.

Nussa aired on television starting in 2019, through Indonesian networks NET, on 6 May, and Indosiar, on 12 October, as well as Malaysia's Astro Ceria in the same year. On 24 April 2020, the series aired on Indonesia's Trans TV.

== Cast ==
- Muzakki Ramdhan as Nussa
- Aysha Razaana Ocean Fajar as Rarra
- Jessy Milianty as Umma (Nussa and Rarra's mother)
- Malka Hayfa Asyari as Abdul
- Mahira Sausan Andi as Syifa
- Hamka Siregar as Pak Ucok
- Dewi Sandra as Tante Dewi

== Awards and nominations ==
Year	Appreciation	Nomination	Results
2019	Anugerah Syiar Ramadhan 2019	Production House Indonesian Youth Inspiration	Won
2019	Anugerah Penyiaran Ramah Anak 2019	Indonesian Animation Program	Nominated
2019	Anugerah Penyiaran Ramah Anak 2019	Children's Favorite Program	Won

== Movie adaptation ==
Nussa was adapted into a theatrical movie, produced both by The Little Giantz and Visinema Pictures. The movie, which bears the same name, was released on October 14, 2021, following several delays due to the COVID-19 pandemic.
