= Jessica Mila =

Indonesian actress (born 1992)

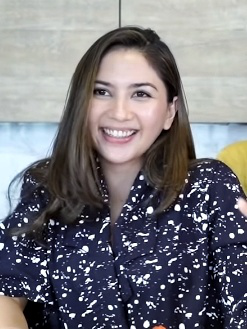
- Mila in 2020
- Born: Jessica Mila Agnesia; August 3, 1992 (age 33); Langsa, Aceh, Indonesia
- Other name: Jessica Mila
- Occupations: Celebrity; Model
- Years active: 2004 - present
- Spouse: Yakup Hasibuan (m. 2023)
- Parent(s): Bambang Sutedjo (father); Jane Magdalena Baker (mother)
- Relatives: Otto Hasibuan (father-in-law)

Jessica Mila Agnesia or better known as Jessica Mila (born in Langsa, Nanggroe Aceh Darussalam, Indonesia on August 3, 1992) is an actress and model of mixed Dutch, Minahasan and Javanese descent.

== Early life ==
Jessica Mila was born in Langsa, Aceh, on 3 August 1992. Her father is Indian-Javanese, while her mother is French-Dutch-Minahasa; she is the youngest daughter of the family and has three brothers. She started her career at a very young age, acting in the tv drama series Cinta SMU on Indosiar in 2004. She is a graduate of SMA Negeri 70 Jakarta, finished college with a Bachelor's degree in Management Entrepreneurship from Binus University in Jakarta.

== Personal life ==
Mila married Indonesian advocate Yakup Hasibuan in Gereja HKBP Rawamangun, Jakarta, on 5 May 2023.

== Filmography ==
- Slank Nggak Ada Matinya (2013)
- Marmut Merah Jambu (2014)
- Surga Di Telapak Kaki Ibu (2016)
- Pacarku Anak Koruptor (2016)
- Dubsmash (2016)
- Koala Kumal (2016)
- Jones Jomblo Ngenes (2016)
- Mata Batin (2017)
- Mata Batin 2 (2019)
- Bridezilla (2019)
- Imperfect (2019)
