= Citra Award for Best Supporting Actor =

Award given annually at the Indonesian Film Festival

- Awarded for: Best supporting actor of the year
- Country: Indonesia
- Presented by: Indonesian Film Festival
- First award: 1955
- Currently held by: Omara Esteghlal, The Siege at Thorn High (2025)

Highlights
- Most wins: El Manik (3)
- Most nominations: El Manik (7); Deddy Mizwar (7)
- Website: festivalfilm.id

The Citra Award for Best Supporting Actor (Indonesian: Piala Citra untuk Pemeran Pendukung Pria Terbaik) is an award given at the Indonesian Film Festival (FFI) to Indonesian actors for their achievements in a supporting role. The Citra Awards, described by Screen International as "Indonesia's equivalent to the Oscars", are the country's most prestigious film awards and are intended to recognize achievements in films as well as to draw public interest to the film industry.

Alex Abbad is the most recent winner for his performance in Falling in Love Like in Movies at the 2024 ceremony.

== History ==
The Citra Awards, then known as the Indonesian Film Festival Awards, were first given in 1955 to Bambang Hermanto and Awaludin, co-stars of the film Lewat Djam Malam. Succeeding festivals were held in 1960 and 1967 and annually since 1973. There were no Citra Awards given between 1993 and 2003 due to sharp decline in domestic film production. It was reinstated as an annual event in 2004 after receiving funds from the Indonesian government.

El Manik is the most successful actor in this category with three wins out of seven nominations, followed by Deddy Mizwar with two wins out of seven nominations. Combined with his record in the Best Actor category, Mizwar is Indonesia's most decorated actor with five overall Citra Awards out of seventeen nominations. Slamet Rahardjo holds the distinction for most nominations without any wins with five, most recently in 2017 for Sweet 20. However, Rahardjo has two wins as a lead actor for Ranjang Pengantin in 1975 and Di Balik Kelambu in 1983.

Two actors have received multiple nominations in the same year: Amak Baldjun for Janur Kuning and Sepasang Merpati in 1980 (lost to Hassan Sanusi) as well as Agus Kuncoro for ? and Tendangan dari Langit in 2011 (lost to Mathias Muchus).

The category was not included at the 1974 ceremony.

== See also ==
- Cinema of Indonesia
- Indonesian Film Festival
- Citra Award for Best Picture
- Citra Award for Best Director
- Citra Award for Best Actor
- Citra Award for Best Actress
- Citra Award for Best Supporting Actress
- Maya Awards
