= 2020 Maya Awards (Indonesia) =

2020 Indonesian film awards

9th Maya Awards
- Awarded for: The achievement in Indonesian cinema
- Presented on: 6–7 March 2021

Highlights
- Best Picture: Mecca I'm Coming
- Most awards: Mecca I'm Coming (5)
- Most nominations: Abracadabra and Mecca I'm Coming (12)

The 9th Maya Awards took place from 6 to 7 March 2021 virtually to honor the achievement in Indonesian cinema released in 2020.

Satirical comedy film Mecca I'm Coming received the most awards with five, including Best Feature Film. Other winners included Abracadabra with four, The Science of Fictions with three, Homecoming and Mariposa with two.

== Winners and nominees ==
The nominations were announced on 1 February 2021 on the award's social media. Comedy films Abracadabra and Mecca I'm Coming led the nominations with twelve, followed by drama film The Science of Fictions with eleven.

=== Awards ===
Winners are listed first, highlighted in boldface, and indicated with a double dagger (‡).

**Best Feature Film**: **Mecca I'm Coming – Hanung Bramantyo**‡; Abracadabra – Ifa Isfansyah; #FriendbutMarried2 – Frederica; Homecoming – Perlita Desiani; Mariposa – Frederica and Chand Parwez Servia; A Million Love – Zairin Zain; Quarantine Tales – Nadina Habsjah, Sari Mochtan, Shanty Harmayn, Tanya Yuson, Florence Giovani, Agustiya Herdwiyanto, Andi Budrah, Sadam Ramadhan, Rheno Agung Yudhanto, and Ignatius Dimas Yulianto; The Science of Fictions – Arya Sweta, Edwin Nazir, Yulia Evina Bhara, and Yosep Anggi Noen	**Best Feature Film for Limited Release**: **Other Man's Wife – Dirmawan Hatta**‡; The Boy with Moving Image – Roufy Nasution; Jandi La Surong – Ori Semloko; Mountain Song – Yusuf Radjamuda
**Best Director**: **Yosep Anggi Noen – The Science of Fictions**‡; Adriyanto Dewo – Homecoming; Fajar Bustomi – Mariposa; Faozan Rizal – Abracadabra; Rako Prijanto – #FriendbutMarried2	**Iqbal Rais Award for Best Directorial Debut Feature**: **Jeihan Angga – Mecca I'm Coming**‡; Arie Kriting – Ghost Painter; Fanny Chotimah – You and I; M. Irfan Ramli – Generasi 90an: Melankolia; Upie Guava – Tsunami Killed My Bandmates
**Best Actor in a Leading Role**: **Gunawan Maryanto – The Science of Fictions as Siman**‡; Angga Yunanda – Mariposa as Iqbal; Deddy Mizwar – A Million Love as Aktor Sagala; Reza Rahadian – Abracadabra as Lukman; Rizky Nazar – Mecca I'm Coming as Eddy	**Best Actress in a Leading Role**: **Putri Ayudya – Homecoming as Aida**‡; Aurélie Moeremans – Story of Kale: When Someone's in Love as Dinda; Mawar de Jongh – #FriendbutMarried2 as Ayudia Bing Slamet; Michelle Ziudith – Mecca I'm Coming as Eni; Syifa Hadju – A Million Love as Gina
**Best Actor in a Supporting Role**: **Totos Rasiti – Mecca I'm Coming as Soleh**‡; Arya Saloka – Story of Kale: When Someone's in Love as Argo; Butet Kartaredjasa – Abracadabra as head of police; Umay Shahab – A Million Love as Wisnu; Yoga Pratama – Homecoming as Agus	**Best Actress in a Supporting Role**: **Ria Irawan – Mecca I'm Coming as Ramah**‡; Asmara Abigail – Homecoming as Santi; Dian Sastrowardoyo – Crazy Awesome Teachers as Nirmala; Marcella Zalianty – Generasi 90an: Melankolia as Abby's mother; Widika Sidmore – May the Devil Take You Too as Gadis
**Arifin C. Noer Award for Best Brief Memorable Performance**: **Adi Kurdi – Sabar Ini Ujian as Sabar**‡; Aurélie Moeremans – May the Devil Take You Too as Dewi; Dwi Sasono – Mecca I'm Coming as Pietoyo; Luna Maya – Sabar Ini Ujian as Tiffany; Siti Fauziah – Mecca I'm Coming as arisan leader	**Best Young Performer**: **Yasamin Jasem – Mangkujiwo as Uma**‡; Anantya Rezky – Asih 2 as Ana; Hadijah Shahab – May the Devil Take You Too as Nara; Rey Bong – The End of Doel's Love Story as Abdullah; Widuri Puteri – My Diaries as Rintik
**Best Breakthrough Actor**: **Junior Roberts – Mariposa as Glen**‡; Cemal Faruk – Tarung Sarung as Sanrego; Yudi Ahmad Tajudin – The Science of Fictions as Ndapuk/Tapon	**Tuti Indra Malaon Award for Best Breakthrough Actress**: **Arawinda Kirana – Quarantine Tales as Adin**‡; Dannia Salsabilla – Mariposa as Amanda; Shakira Jasmine – Crazy Awesome Teachers as Saulina
**Best Original Screenplay**: **Homecoming – Adriyanto Dewo**‡; A Million Love – Wiraputra Basri and Amirudin Olland; Quarantine Tales – Dian Sastrowardoyo, Jason Iskandar, Ifa Isfansyah, Ahmad Aditya, Aco Tenri, and Sidharta Tata; Sabar Ini Ujian – Anggy Umbara, Gianluigi Ch, and Erwin Wu; The Science of Fictions – Yosep Anggi Noen	**Best Adapted Screenplay**: **Mecca I'm Coming – Jeihan Angga**‡; #FriendbutMarried2 – Johanna Wattimena; Mangkujiwo – Dirmawan Hatta and Erwanto Alphadullah; Mariposa – Alim Sudio; Story of Kale: When Someone's in Love – M. Irfan Ramli
**Best Cinematography**: **Abracadabra – Gandang Warah**‡; #FriendbutMarried2 – Hani Pradigya; Homecoming – Vera Lestafa; May the Devil Take You Too – Gunnar Nimpuno; The Science of Fictions – Teoh Gay Hian	**Best Art Direction**: **Abracadabra – Vida Sylvia**‡; Mangkujiwo – Tomy D. Setyanto; May the Devil Take You Too – Antonius Boedy Santoso; Mecca I'm Coming – Deki Yudhanto; The Science of Fictions – Deki Yudhanto
**Best Editing**: **Mariposa – Ryan Purwoko**‡; #FriendbutMarried2 – Aline Jusria; May the Devil Take You Too – Teguh Raharjo; Mecca I'm Coming – Ahyat Andrianto and Jeihan Angga; Sabar Ini Ujian – Cesa David Luckmansyah	**Best Visual Effects**: **May the Devil Take You Too – Setyo Anggono, Lucas Adhityo, and Kholish Abdulhaq**‡; Abracadabra – Amrin Nugraha; Asih 2 – Harris Reggy; Mangkujiwo – Kotak Ide; Tsunami Killed My Bandmates – Nico Bhisma
**Best Costume Design**: **Abracadabra – Hagai Pakan**‡; #FriendbutMarried2 – Meutia Setijono Pudjowarsito; Mangkujiwo – Boy Ari Yandhi; The Science of Fictions – Irmina Kristina; Warkop DKI Reborn 4 – Meutia Setijono Pudjowarsito	**Best Make-Up & Hair**: **Abracadabra – Eba Sheba**‡; Mangkujiwo – Renata Nae; May the Devil Take You Too – Novie Ariyanti; The Science of Fictions – Anismcaw; Warkop DKI Reborn 4 – Gunawan Saragih
**Best Sound**: **Asih 2 – Aria Prayogi and Suhadi**‡; Abracadabra – Krisna Purna, Dicky Permana; Mangkujiwo – Mohamad Ikhsan and Sutrisno; May the Devil Take You Too – Hiro Ishizaka and Arief Budi Santoso; The Science of Fictions – Hadrianus Eko, Firman Satyanegara, and Yasuhiro Morinaga	**Best Score**: **#FriendbutMarried2 – Andhika Triyadi**‡; Abracadabra – Krisna Purna; The End of Doel's Love Story – Purwatjaraka; Homecoming – Lie Indra Perkasa; Mariposa – Andhika Triyadi
**Best Theme Song**: **"Kemarin" from Tsunami Killed My Bandmates – Written by Herman Sikumbang; Performed by Ifan Seventeen**‡; "Dari Kata Turun Ke Hati" from The Ex-Lover Shop – Written by Andi Rianto and Titien Wattimena; Performed by Dea Panendra; "I Just Couldn't Save You Tonight" from Story of Kale: When Someone's in Love – Written by Ardhito Pramono; Performed by Pramono and Aurélie Moeremans; "Rumit" from Mariposa – Written by Kakung Triatmojo and Arman Harjo; Performed by Langit Sore; "Teman Sampai Surga" from #FriendbutMarried2 – Written by Ditto Percussion and Ayudia Bing Slamet; Performed by Dengarkan Dia	**Best Poster Design**: **The Science of Fictions – Gandhi Setyawan**‡; Abracadabra – Yazied Syafa'at and Dian Ariya Nusantara; Letter from Death – Jonathan Oh; Mecca I'm Coming – Apri Kusbiantoro; Tsunami Killed My Bandmates – Endonestuff
**Best Short Film**: **Anxietus Domicupus – Gugun Arief**‡; Adam (Far Away From The Memories) – Zhaddam; Golden Frames in the Closet – Putri Sarah Amelia; Kelompok Tidak Belajar – Mustafa; Lantun Rakyat – Moch. Dwi Cahya; Masa Depan Cerah 2040 – Winner Wijaya; Pakaslah Biola – M. Ritzky Saibi; Rindu Tenggelam – Magung Budiman; Stylus – Greg Sugiono	**Best Music Video**: **"Lathi" by Weird Genius featuring Sara Fajira – YBRAP and Creamypandaxx**‡; "Hoolala" by Yura Yunita – Bramsky; "Kala Cinta Menggoda" by Noah – Upie Guava; "Mr. Sun" by Rendy Pandugo – Ivan Saputra Alam; "Reflection" by Yura Yunita, Sivia, Agatha Pricilla, and Nadin Amizah – Aditya Ahmad; "Rindu Dalam Hati" by Arsy Widianto and Brisia Jodie – Upie Guava; "Serenata Jiwa Lara" by Diskoria featuring Dian Sastrowardoyo – Anton Ismael; "Si Lemah" by RAN and Hindia – Sakti Marendra
**Best Animated Feature Film**: **Titus: Mystery of the Enygma – Dineshkumar Subaschandra**‡; Riki Rhino – Erwin Budiono	**Best Animated Short Film**: **Atlas Boy Adventures: Serangan Hantu Abu-Abu – Merry Wijaya and Natassya Siregar**; Kasat Mata – Sari Pololessy; Lost In Sekaten – Hizkia Subiyantoro; Nussa: Bubar Jalan – Bony Wirasmono; Terciduk – Alan Dharmasaputra Wijaya
**Best Documentary Feature Film**: **You and I – Fanny Chotimah**‡; Help Is On The Way – Ismail Fahmi Lubis; Islands of Faith – Chairun Nissa; kOsOng – Chonie Prysilia and Hizkia Subiyantoro; Tsunami Killed My Bandmates – Upie Guava	**Best Documentary Short Film**: **Cerita Tentang Sinema di Sudut yang Lain – Hariwi**; Black Note – Andri Kurniawan and M. Rizky; Gimbal – Sidiq Ariyadi; Perempuan di Sarang Owa – Andi Ilmi Utami Irwan; Shin Hua – Erick Sutanto

=== Films with multiple nominations and awards ===
Films that received multiple nominations
Nominations	Film
12	Abracadabra
12	Mecca I'm Coming
11	The Science of Fictions
9	#FriendbutMarried2
9	Mariposa
9	May the Devil Take You Too
8	Homecoming
7	Mangkujiwo
5	A Million Love
5	Tsunami Killed My Bandmates
4	Sabar Ini Ujian
4	Story of Kale: When Someone's in Love
3	Asih 2
3	Quarantine Tales
2	Crazy Awesome Teachers
2	The End of Doel's Love Story
2	Generasi 90an: Melankolia
2	Warkop DKI Reborn 4

Films that received multiple awards
Awards	Film
5	Mecca I'm Coming
4	Abracadabra
3	The Science of Fictions
2	Homecoming
2	Mariposa
