= 35th Palm Springs International Film Festival =

2024 film festival

- Official poster
- Opening film: Wicked Little Letters
- Closing film: Ex-Husbands
- Location: Palm Springs, California, United States
- Festival date: January 4–14, 2024

Palm Springs International Film Festival
- 2025 2023

The 35th Palm Springs International Film Festival took place from January 4 to 14, 2024, in Palm Springs, California, United States. The festival opened with the world premiere of Thea Sharrock's comedy mystery film Wicked Little Letters and closed with Noah Pritzker's black comedy film Ex-Husbands.

== Background and special awards ==
As usual, throughout late 2023, several special awards were announced, which were presented at the Opening Gala on January 4, 2023, at the Palm Springs Convention Center. Martin Scorsese's western drama Killers of the Flower Moon received the Vanguard Award. The Desert Palm Achievement for Best Actor and Best Actress went to Cillian Murphy and Emma Stone for their performances in Oppenheimer and Poor Things, respectively. Da'Vine Joy Randolph won the Breakthrough Performance Award for The Holdovers, while Jeffrey Wright received the Career Achievement Award for American Fiction. Comedy musical film Barbie received two awards: Director of the Year to Greta Gerwig and the Chairman's Award to Billie Eilish and Finneas O'Connell for the song "What Was I Made For?". British actress Carey Mulligan won the International Star Award for Maestro. The Spotlight Award went to Colman Domingo for Rustin and Danielle Brooks for The Color Purple. Paul Giamatti was honored with the Icon Award for The Holdovers.

The following day, on January 5, the Variety's 10 Directors to Watch brunch took place at the Parker Palm Springs, where three Creative Impact awards were presented: Creative Impact in Acting Award to Penélope Cruz; Creative Impact in Screenwriting Award to Eric Roth; and Creative Impact in Directing Award to Yorgos Lanthimos.

== Juries ==
The juries consists of the following members:

=== FIPRESCI International Film Jury ===
- Marriska Fernandes, Canadian film critic.
- Steffen Moestrup, Danish film critic.
- Wilfred Okiche, Nigerian film critic.

=== Ibero-American Jury ===
- Aitch Alberto, American screenwriter and producer at Vaca Frita Inc.
- Kristen Lopez, film editor at TheWrap.
- Sheryl Santacruz, festival director for the Hot Springs Documentary Film Festival.

=== Documentary Jury ===
- Nive Das, South Asian documentary film director and member of Brown Girls Doc Mafia.
- Ken Jacobson, executive director for the Hot Springs Documentary Film Festival.
- Elvis Mitchell, American film critic and host at KCRW.

=== New Voices New Visions ===
- Liliana Granados, Mexican-American film producer.
- Sonaiya Kelley, American reporter at Los Angeles Times.
- Jacqueline Lyanga, American film curator at US Delegate for the Berlin International Film Festival.

== Sections ==
The films selected for each section are as follows:

=== Awards Buzz – Best International Feature Film Submissions ===
The following section consists of submissions for Best International Feature Film at the 96th Academy Awards:

English title	Original title	Director(s)	Production countrie(s)
20 Days in Mariupol	20 днів у Маріуполі	Mstyslav Chernov	Ukraine
About Dry Grasses	Kuru Otlar Üstüne	Nuri Bilge Ceylan	Turkey
Behind the Haystacks	Πίσω από τις θημωνιές	Asimina Proedrou	Greece
Blaga's Lessons	Уроците на Блага	Stephan Komandarev	Bulgaria
Brothers	Bratři	Tomáš Mašín	Czech Republic
The Burdened	المرهقون	Amr Gamal	Yemen
Bye Bye Tiberias	باي باي طبريا	Lina Soualem	Palestine
City of Wind	Сэр сэр салхи	Lkhagvadulam Purev-Ochir	Mongolia
Concrete Utopia	콘크리트 유토피아	Um Tae-hwa	South Korea
The Delinquents	Los delincuentes	Rodrigo Moreno	Argentina
Do Not Expect Too Much from the End of the World	Nu aștepta prea mult de la sfârșitul lumii	Radu Jude	Romania
Fallen Leaves	Kuolleet lehdet	Aki Kaurismäki	Finland
Four Daughters	بنات ألفة	Kaouther Ben Hania	Tunisia
Godland	Volaða land / Vanskabte Land	Hlynur Pálmason	Iceland
Goodbye Julia	وداعا جوليا	Mohamed Kordofani	Sudan
Housekeeping for Beginners	Домаќинство за почетници	Goran Stolevski	North Macedonia
In Flames	ان فلیمز	Zarrar Kahn	Pakistan
Inshallah a Boy	إن شاء الله ولد	Amjad Al-Rasheed	Jordan
Io Capitano		Matteo Garrone	Italy
The Missing	Iti Mapukpukaw	Carl Joseph Papa	Philippines
The Monk and the Gun		Pawo Choyning Dorji	Bhutan
The Mother of All Lies	كذب أبيض	Asmae El Moudir	Morocco
Opponent	Motståndaren	Milad Alami	Sweden
The Peasants	Chłopi	DK Welchman and Hugh Welchman	Poland
Perfect Days		Wim Wenders	Japan
The Promised Land	Bastarden	Nikolaj Arcel	Denmark
The Settlers	Los colonos	Felipe Gálvez Haberle	Chile
Seven Blessings	שבע ברכות	Ayelet Menahemi	Israel
Shayda		Noora Niasari	Australia
Sira		Apolline Traoré	Burkina Faso
Smoke Sauna Sisterhood	Savvusanna sõsarad	Anna Hints	Estonia
Society of the Snow	La sociedad de la nieve	J.A. Bayona	Spain
Songs of Earth	Fedrelandet	Margreth Olin	Norway
Sweet Dreams		Ena Sendijarević	Netherlands
The Taste of Things	La Passion de Dodin Bouffant	Trần Anh Hùng	France
The Teachers' Lounge	Das Lehrerzimmer	İlker Çatak	Germany
Tiger Stripes		Amanda Nell Eu	Malaysia
Tótem		Lila Avilés	Mexico
Vera		Tizza Covi and Rainer Frimmel	Austria
The Zone of Interest		Jonathan Glazer	United Kingdom

Highlighted title indicates the section winner.

=== Talking Pictures ===
The following films were selected to be screened as part of the Talking Pictures section, each with discussion panels with their directors, writers and actors:

English title	Original title	Director(s)	Production countrie(s)
American Fiction (with actor Jeffrey Wright)		Cord Jefferson	United States
Barbie (with director Greta Gerwig)		Greta Gerwig	United States
Killers of the Flower Moon (with screenwriter Eric Roth)		Martin Scorsese	United States

=== Modern Masters ===
The following films were selected to be screened as part of the Modern Masters section, consisting of new films by well-established directors:

English title	Original title	Director(s)	Production countrie(s)
Anselm	Anselm – Das Rauschen der Zeit	Wim Wenders	Germany
Close Your Eyes	Cerrar los ojos	Víctor Erice	Spain, Argentina
The Convert		Lee Tamahori	New Zealand, Australia, United Kingdom
Green Border	Zielona granica	Agnieszka Holland	Poland, Czech Republic, France, Belgium
Kidnapped	Rapito	Marco Bellocchio	Italy, France, Germany
La chimera		Alice Rohrwacher	Italy, France, Switzerland
Monster	怪物	Hirokazu Kore-eda	Japan
The Old Oak		Ken Loach	United Kingdom, France, Belgium
Shoshana		Michael Winterbottom	United States, Italy

=== New Voices New Visions ===
The following films were selected to be screened as part of the New Voices New Visions section:

English title	Original title	Director(s)	Production countrie(s)
Animalia		Sofia Alaoui	France, Morocco
The Animal Kingdom	Le Règne animal	Thomas Cailley	France, Belgium
Humanist Vampire Seeking Consenting Suicidal Person	Vampire humaniste cherche suicidaire consentant	Ariane Louis-Seize	Canada
The Kitchen		Kibwe Tavares and Daniel Kaluuya	United Kingdom
Solitude	Einvera	Ninna Pálmadóttir	Iceland, Slovakia, France
Stolen		Karan Tejpal	India
The Sweet East		Sean Price Williams	United States
We Have Never Been Modern	Úsvit	Matěj Chlupáček	Czech Republic, Slovakia

Highlighted title indicates the section winner.

=== American Indies ===
The following films were selected to be screened as part of the American Indies section:

English title	Original title	Director(s)	Production countrie(s)
Fairyland		Andrew Durham	United States
Fancy Dance		Erica Tremblay	United States
Fresh Kills		Jennifer Esposito	United States
LaRoy, Texas		Shane Atkinson	United States
Late Bloomers		Lisa Steen	United States

=== True Stories ===
The following films were selected to be screened as part of the True Stories section:

English title	Original title	Director(s)	Production countrie(s)
A Look Through His Lens		Matthew Berkowitz and Gregory Hoblit	United States, France, Ireland, United Kingdom
All Illusions Must Be Broken		Laura Dunn and Jef Sewell	United States
All We Carry		Cady Voge	United States, Mexico
Art for Everybody		Miranda Yousef	United States
Bad Faith: Christian Nationalism's Unholy War on Democracy		Stephen Ujlaki and Chris Jones	United States
Born Hungry		Barry Avrich	Canada, India
Call Me Dancer		Leslie Shampaine and Pip Gilmour	India, United States, Israel
Common Ground		Josh Tickell and Rebecca Harrell Tickell	United States
Copa 71		Rachel Ramsay and James Erskine	United Kingdom
The Echo	El eco	Tatiana Huezo	Mexico, Germany
First We Bombed New Mexico		Lois Lipman	United States
Flipside		Chris Wilcha	United States
Gloria Gaynor: I Will Survive		Betsy Schechter	United States, Spain
Going Varsity in Mariachi		Alejandra Vasquez and Sam Osborn	United States
The Gullspång Miracle	Miraklet i Gullspång	Maria Fredriksson	Sweden, Norway, Denmark
Hidden Master: The Legacy of George Platt Lynes		Sam Shahid	United States
In the Rearview	Skąd dokąd / Звідки куди	Maciek Hamela	Poland, France, Ukraine
Liv Ullmann: A Road Less Traveled		Dheeraj Akolkar	Norway, United Kingdom
Mad About the Boy: The Noel Coward Story		Barnaby Thompson	United Kingdom, United States
Maestra		Maggie Contreras	United States
Música!		Rob Epstein and Jeffrey Friedman	United States
Obsessed with Light		Sabine Krayenbühl and Zeva Oelbaum	United States, France, Netherlands, Spain, Iceland
Queendom		Agniia Galdanova	France, United States
Sloane: A Jazz Singer		Michael Lippert	United States
The Space Race		Diego Hurtado De Mendoza and Lisa Cortés	United States
Susan Feniger, Forked		Liz Lachman	United States, Vietnam, China
Swan Song		Chelsea McMullan	Canada
This World is Not My Own		Petter Ringbom and Marquise Stillwell	United States, Sweden
Truth Be Told		Nneka Onuorah	United States

=== South Korean Focus ===
The following films were selected to be screened as part of the South Korean Focus section, dedicated to celebrate South Korean cinema:

English title	Original title	Director(s)	Production countrie(s)
A Normal Family (2023)	보통의 가족	Hur Jin-ho	South Korea
Cobweb (2023)	거미집	Kim Jee-woon	South Korea
The Handmaiden (2016)	아가씨	Park Chan-Wook	South Korea
The Housemaid (1960)	하녀	Kim Ki-young	South Korea
In Our Day (2023)	우리의 하루	Hong Sang-soo	South Korea
Memories of Murder (2003)	살인의 추억	Bong Joon-ho	South Korea
Oasis (2002)	오아시스	Lee Chang-dong	South Korea
Sleep (2023)	잠	Jason Yu	South Korea
Spring, Summer, Fall, Winter... and Spring (2003)	봄 여름 가을 겨울 그리고 봄	Kim Ki-duk	South Korea
Sunny (2011)	써니	Kang Hyeong-cheol	South Korea
Train to Busan (2016)	부산행	Yeon Sang-ho	South Korea

=== Queer Cinema Today & The Gayla ===
The following films were selected to be screened as part of the Queer Cinema Today section and The Gayla:

English title	Original title	Director(s)	Production countrie(s)
Big Boys		Corey Sherman	United States
Bonus Track		Julia Jackman	United Kingdom
Chasing Chasing Amy		Sav Rodgers	United States
Chuck Chuck Baby		Janis Pugh	United Kingdom
Egoist	エゴイスト	Daishi Matsunaga	Japan
Studio One Forever		Marc Saltarelli	United States
Summer Qamp		Jen Markowitz	Canada

=== Spotlight: James Ivory ===
The following films were selected to be screened as part of a section destined to highlight American director James Ivory's filmography:

English title	Original title	Director(s)	Production countrie(s)
The Bostonians (1984)		James Ivory	United Kingdom, United States
Howards End (1992)		James Ivory	United Kingdom
Maurice (1987)		James Ivory	United Kingdom
Merchant Ivory (2023)		Stephen Soucy	United States
Quartet (1981)		James Ivory	France, United Kingdom
Shakespeare Wallah (1965)		James Ivory	United States, India

=== Family Day ===
The following films were selected to be screened as part of the Family Day section:

English title	Original title	Director(s)	Production countrie(s)
Dancing Queen		Aurora Gossé	Norway
Flamin' Hot		Eva Longoria	United States
Spider-Man: Across the Spider-Verse		Joaquim Dos Santos, Kemp Powers and Justin K. Thompson	United States
Teenage Mutant Ninja Turtles: Mutant Mayhem		Jeff Rowe	United States

=== World Cinema Now ===
The following films were selected to be screened as part of the World Cinema Now section:

English title	Original title	Director(s)	Production countrie(s)
100 Yards		Xu Haofeng and Xu Junfeng	China
20,000 Species of Bees	20.000 especies de abejas	Estibaliz Urresola Solaguren	Spain
All About the Lefvoviches	Lefkovicsék gyászolnak	Ádám Breier	Hungary
Amal		Jawad Rhalib	Belgium, France
BlackBerry		Matt Johnson	Canada
Blackbird Blackbird Blackberry	Shashvi shashvi maq'vali	Elene Naveriani	Switzerland, Georgia
Bonjour Switzerland		Peter Luisi	Switzerland, Italy
Chicken for Linda!	Linda veut du poulet!	Sébastien Laudenbach and Chiara Malta	France, Italy
Day Off	本日公休	Tien-Yu Fu	Taiwan
Empire	Viften	Frederikke Aspöck	Denmark
The Extortion	La extorsión	Martino Zaidelis	Argentina
Ezra		Tony Goldwyn	United States
The Fishbowl	La pecera	Glorimar Marrero Sánchez	Puerto Rico, Spain
Freud's Last Session		Matthew Brown	United States
The Goldman Case	Le Procès Goldman	Cédric Kahn	France
Guardians of the Formula	Čuvari formule	Dragan Bjelogrlić	Serbia, Slovenia, Montenegro, North Macedonia
Hajjan	هجّان	Abu Bakr Shawky	Saudi Arabia, Egypt, Jordan
Hesitation Wound	Tereddüt Çizgisi	Selman Nacar	Turkey, Spain, Romania, France
Holly		Fien Troch	Belgium, Netherlands, Luxembourg, France
Joika		James Napier Robertson	New Zealand, Poland
Les Indésirables	Bâtiment 5	Ladj Ly	France
Let the Dance Begin	Empieza el baile	Marina Seresesky	Argentina, Spain
Lies We Tell		Lisa Mulcahy	Ireland
Listen Up!		Kaveh Tehrani	Norway
Memory		Michel Franco	United States, Mexico
Mr. Blake at Your Service!	Well Done!, Complètement cramé!	Gilles Legardinier	France
Mrs		Arati Kadav	India
Night Courier		Ali Kalthami	Saudi Arabia
One Life		James Hawes	United Kingdom, United States
The Performance		Shira Piven	United States
Power Alley	Levante	Lillah Halla	Brazil, France, Uruguay
Puan		María Alché and Benjamín Naishtat	Argentina, Brazil, Germany, Italy, France
Red Rooms	Les chambres rouges	Pascal Plante	Canada
Temporaries	Richelieu	Pier-Philippe Chevigny	Canada, France
Robot Dreams		Pablo Berger	Spain, France
Running on Sand		Adar Shafran	Israel
Shame on Dry Land	Syndabocken	Axel Petersén	Sweden, Malta
Sumo Didi		Jayant Rohatgi	India
Terrestrial Verses	آیه های زمینی	Ali Asgari and Alireza Khatami	Iran
They Shot the Piano Player	Dispararon al pianista	Fernando Trueba and Javier Mariscal	Spain, France, Netherlands, Portugal, Peru
Together 99	Tillsammans 99	Lukas Moodysson	Sweden, Denmark
The Trouble with Jessica		Matt Winn	United Kingdom
Unicorns		Sally El Hosaini and James Krishna Floyd	United Kingdom, United States, Sweden
The Vanishing Soldier	החייל	Dani Rosenberg	Israel
Without Air	Elfogy a levegő	Katalin Moldovai	Hungary
Wonderland	乐园	Chai Yee Wei	Singapore, Malaysia, United States

=== Flashback ===
The following films were selected to be screened as part of the Flashback section:

English title	Original title	Director(s)	Production countrie(s)
Goodfellas (1990)		Martin Scorsese	United States
Paris Is Burning (1990)		Jennie Livingston	United States
Wild at Heart (1990)		David Lynch	United States

=== Local Spotlight ===
The following films were selected to be screened as part of the Local Spotlight section:

English title	Original title	Director(s)	Production countrie(s)
Amongst the Trees		Trent Ubben and Jack Jensen	United States
The Green Desert		Leo Zahn	United States

== Awards ==
The following awards were presented at the 35th Edition:

=== International Film competition ===
- Best International Feature Film: Four Daughters by Kaouther Ben Hania
- Best Actor in an International Feature Film: Mads Mikkelsen for The Promised Land
- Best Actress in an International Feature Film: Leonie Benesch for The Teachers' Lounge
- Best International Screenplay: Jonathan Glazer for The Zone of Interest

=== Ibero-American Competition ===
- Ibero-American Award: Power Alley by Lillah Halla
- Ibero-American Special Mention: 20,000 Species of Bees by Estibaliz Urresola Solaguren

=== Documentary competition ===
- Best Documentary: The Echo by Tatiana Huezo
- Special Mention: This World is Not My Own by Petter Ringbom and Marquise Stillwell

=== New Voices New Visions ===
- New Voices New Visions Award: The Animal Kingdom by Thomas Cailley
- New Voices New Visions Special Mention: Animalia by Sofia Alaoui

=== Other awards ===
- Local Jury Award: Wonderland by Chai Yee Wei
- Young Cineastes Award: Humanist Vampire Seeking Consenting Suicidal Person by Ariane Louis-Seize
- MOZAIK Bridging the Borders Award: Green Border by Agnieszka Holland
  - MOZAIK Bridging the Borders Special Mention: The Old Oak by Ken Loach
- Audience Award for Best Fiction Film: One Life by James Hawes
- Audience Award for Best Documentary Film: Common Ground by Josh Tickell and Rebecca Harrell Tickell

=== Opening Gala Awards ===
The following awards were presented during the opening gala:

- Vanguard Award: Killers of the Flower Moon by Martin Scorsese
- Desert Palm Achievement for Best Actor: Cillian Murphy for Oppenheimer
- Desert Palm Achievement for Best Actress: Emma Stone for Poor Things
- Breakthrough Performance Award: Da'Vine Joy Randolph for The Holdovers
- Career Achievement Award: Jeffrey Wright for American Fiction
- Director of the Year Award: Greta Gerwig for Barbie
- International Star Award: Carey Mulligan for Maestro
- Spotlight Award: Colman Domingo for Rustin
- Spotlight Award: Danielle Brooks for The Color Purple
- Chairman's Award: Billie Eilish and Finneas O'Connell for the song "What Was I Made For?" from Barbie
- Icon Award: Paul Giamatti for The Holdovers.

=== Creative Impact Awards ===
The following creative impact awards were presented:

- Creative Impact in Acting Award to Penélope Cruz
- Creative Impact in Screenwriting Award to Eric Roth
- Creative Impact in Directing Award to Yorgos Lanthimos

== Variety's 10 Directors to Watch ==
The list consisted of the following directors:

- Blitz Bazawule (The Color Purple)
- İlker Çatak (The Teachers' Lounge)
- Sophie Dupuis (Solo)
- Cord Jefferson (American Fiction)
- Titus Kaphar (Exhibiting Forgiveness)
- Anna Kendrick (Woman of the Hour)
- Kobi Libii (The American Society of Magical Negroes)
- Aaron Schimberg (A Different Man)
- Ena Sendijarević (Sweet Dreams)
- Eva Trobisch (Ivo)
