= Solo, Solitude =

2016 Indonesian film

- Theatrical release poster
- Istirahatlah Kata-Kata
- Directed by: Yosep Anggi Noen
- Written by: Yosep Anggi Noen
- Produced by: Yosep Anggi Noen; Yulia Evina Bhara
- Starring: Gunawan Maryanto; Marissa Anita; Eduward Manalu; Melanie Subono; Davi Yunan
- Cinematography: Bayu Prihantoro Filemon
- Edited by: Andi Pulung Waluyo
- Music by: Yennu Ariendra
- Production companies: Limaenam Films; KawanKawan Film; Partisipasi Indonesia; Yayasan Muara
- Release dates: 9 August 2016 (Locarno); 19 January 2017 (Indonesia)
- Running time: 97 minutes
- Country: Indonesia
- Languages: Indonesian; Javanese

Solo, Solitude (Indonesian: Istirahatlah Kata-Kata) is a 2016 Indonesian biographical drama film written, directed, and produced by Yosep Anggi Noen about disappeared activist and poet Widji Thukul.

== Synopsis ==
Solo, Solitude tells a dramatized story of Widji Thukul, a poet whose works were known to be critical of the Suharto regime in Indonesia. When a riot broke out in Jakarta in July 1996, Thukul remained steadfast in his criticisms despite looming threats. He was scapegoated by the government as a provocator and fled to Pontianak and lived in exile for 8 months.

== Cast ==
- Gunawan Maryanto as Widji Thukul
- Marissa Anita as Sipon
- Eduward Manalu as Martin
- Melanie Subono as Ida
- Davi Yunan as Thomas

== Production ==
According to producer Yulia Evina Bhara, the idea to make the film began with an initiative to create murals of Indonesian poets which she was a part of alongside writer Okky Madasari and women's rights activist Tungal Pawestri. Once she decided to produce the film, she hired Noen to helm the project.

While developing the film, Noen read Thukul's poems and met with his friends. Writer Mumu Aloha developed the story before Noen made it into a screenplay, after which the production team decided that the film would focus on Thukul's time while in exile in Pontianak.

== Release ==
Solo, Solitude premiered at the Locarno Film Festival in Switzerland on 9 August 2016. It received a limited theatrical release in Indonesia a few months later on 19 January 2017.

== Reception ==
=== Box office ===
According to producer Yulia Evina Bhara, the film had garnered 51,424 admissions within the first month of its release in Indonesia. While not a commercial success, Bhara noted that the number reflected an "extraordinary" reception from local audience for an independent film.

=== Critical reception ===
In a review for Tirto, writer Dea Anugrah criticized the film for depicting Thukul as someone who "turned his back on Java, the main arena for politics and culture in Indonesia" while "hiding in fear". Anugrah also criticized the character of Ida which he called inconsequential to the film's narrative and the film's screenplay as "excessive" and "redundant". While also noting the film's focus on Thukul's fear and paranoia, Adrian Jonathan Pasaribu of Cinema Poetica wrote that the "paranoia is translated beautifully in the film’s visual grammar". In contrast with Anugrah's review, Pasaribu instead praised the film for "not romanticiz[ing] Thukul as some kind of superhuman [...] who is sometimes powerless in his struggle against tyranny and injustice."

Discussing the film's "very slow pace and lack of action and dialogue", Panos Kotzathanasi of the Asian Movie Pulse called the film "not easy to watch", while also noting that "if one can overcome these restrictions" the film "comes across a very beautiful and meaningful film that highlights the benefits of 'slow cinema'." Similarly, Clarence Tsui of The Hollywood Reporter highlighted the film's "surreal images" of "long sequences of quotidian life". Tsui further compared the film favorably to Anocha Suwichakornpong's By the Time It Gets Dark which "offers a poignant reflection of humanity drawn from the turbulent recent histories of Southeast Asia."

== Accolades ==
| Year | Award | Category | Recipient | Result |
|---|---|---|---|---|
| 2016 | Locarno Film Festival | Filmmakers of the Present | Yosep Anggi Noen | Nominated |
| 2016 | Filmfest Hamburg | Political Film Award | Solo, Solitude | Nominated |
| 2016 | Pacific Meridian International Film Festival of Asia Pacific Countries | Grand Prix | Solo, Solitude | Nominated |
| 2016 | QCinema International Film Festival | Pylon Award | Yosep Anggi Noen | Nominated |
| 2016 | Jogja-NETPAC Asian Film Festival | Golden Hanoman Award | Yosep Anggi Noen | Won |
| 2016 | 36th Citra Awards | Best Director | Yosep Anggi Noen | Nominated |
| 2016 | 36th Citra Awards | Best Original Screenplay | Yosep Anggi Noen | Nominated |
| 2017 | 2nd Usmar Ismail Awards | Best Film | Solo, Solitude | Nominated |
| 2017 | 2nd Usmar Ismail Awards | Best Director | Yosep Anggi Noen | Won |
| 2017 | 2nd Usmar Ismail Awards | Favorite Actor | Gunawan Maryanto | Won |
| 2017 | 7th Maya Awards | Best Actor in a Leading Role | Gunawan Maryanto | Nominated |
| 2017 | 7th Maya Awards | Best Actress in a Leading Role | Marissa Anita | Nominated |
