= 14th Jogja-NETPAC Asian Film Festival =

2019 film festival

- Opening film: Abracadabra by Faozan Rizal
- Closing film: Motel Acacia by Bradley Liew
- Location: Yogyakarta, Indonesia
- Founded: 2006
- Festival date: 19–23 November 2019
- Website: jaff-filmfest.org

Jogja-NETPAC Asian Film Festival
- 15th 13th

The 14th Jogja-NETPAC Asian Film Festival was held on 19 to 23 November 2019 in Yogyakarta, Indonesia. A total of 107 films from 23 countries were screened during the festival. Black comedy fantasy film Abracadabra opened the festival and it closed with Bradley Liew's Hotel Acacia.

Korean drama film House of Hummingbird won the festival's most prestigious award, Golden Hanoman Award.

== Official selections ==
=== Opening and closing films ===
English title	Original title	Director(s)	Production country
Abracadabra (opening film)		Faozan Rizal	Indonesia
Motel Acacia (closing film)		Bradley Liew	Malaysia, Philippines, Singapore, Slovenia, Taiwan, Thailand, United States

=== Asian Features ===
English title	Original title	Director(s)	Production country
Aurora		Bekzat Pirmatov	Kyrgyzstan
Blue Wind Blows		Tetsuya Tomina	Japan
Buoyancy		Rodd Rathjen	Australia, Cambodia, Thailand
A First Farewell	第一次的离别	Lina Wang	China
House of Hummingbird	벌새	Kim Bora	South Korea
Last Night I Saw You Smiling	យប់មិញបងឃើញអូនញញឹម	Kavich Neang	Cambodia, France
Liway		Dakip "Kip" Oebanda	Philippines
Ma.Ama		Dominic Sangma	India
Mountain Song		Yusuf Radjamuda	Indonesia
Nakorn-Sawan	นคร-สวรรค์	Puangsoi Aksornsawang	Thailand, Germany
Ode to Nothing	Oda sa Wala	Dwein Ruedas Baltazar	Philippines
Paangshu		Visakesa Chandrasekaram	Sri Lanka
The Science of Fictions	Hiruk-Pikuk si Al-Kisah	Yosep Anggi Noen	Indonesia, France, Malaysia
Song Lang		Leon Le	Vietnam
Tehran: City of Love	تهران شهر عشق	Ali Jaberansari	Iran, Netherlands, United Kingdom
Trees Under the Sun	Veyilmarangal	Bijukumar Damodaran	India
Verdict		Raymund Ribay Gutierrez	Philippines, France
Wet Season	热带雨	Anthony Chen	Singapore, China, Taiwan

=== Asian Perspectives ===
English title	Original title	Director(s)	Production country
Asandhimitta	අසන්ධිමිත්තා	Asoka Handagama	Sri Lanka
The Cave	นางนอน	Tom Waller	Thailand
Demons		Daniel Hui	Singapore
Fortitude	Sabot	Rashid Malikov	Uzbekistan
Journey	Lakbayan	Brillante Mendoza, Kidlat Tahimik, Lav Diaz	Philippines
Konpaku		Remi M. Sali	Singapore
Lunana: A Yak in the Classroom	ལུང་ནག་ན	Pawo Choyning Dorji	Bhutan, China
Many Undulating Things		Wang Bo, Pan Lu	Hong Kong, South Korea, United States
Roh		Emir Ezwan	Malaysia
Sugar on the Weaver's Chair	Empu	Harvan Agustriansyah	Indonesia
The Sweet Requiem	སྐྱོ་དབྱངས་མངར་མོ།	Tenzing Sonam, Ritu Sarin	India, United States
The Wall	เณรกระโดดกำแพง	Boonsong Nakphoo	Thailand

=== JAFF Indonesian Screen Awards ===
English title	Original title	Director(s)
DoReMi & You		BW Purbanegara
Gundala		Joko Anwar
Humba Dreams		Riri Riza
Love for Sale 2		Andibachtiar Yusuf
Mecca I'm Coming	Mekah I'm Coming	Jeihan Angga
Susi Susanti: Love All		Sim F
Two Blue Stripes	Dua Garis Biru	Gina S. Noer

== Awards ==
The following awards were presented at the festival:

- Golden Hanoman Award

House of Hummingbird by Kim Bora

- Silver Hanoman Award

The Science of Fictions by Yosep Anggi Noen

- NETPAC Award

Aurora by Bekzat Pirmatov
Nakorn-Sawan by Puangsoi Aksornsawang

- JAFF Indonesian Screen Awards

Best Film: Two Blue Stripes
Best Director: Gina S. Noer – Two Blue Stripes
Best Cinematography: Yunus Pasolang – Susi Susanti: Love All
Best Performance: Laura Basuki – Susi Susanti: Love All
Best Screenplay: Gina S. Noer – Dua Garis Biru

- GEBER Award

Ma.Ama by Dominic Sangma

- Jogja Film Student Award

Diary of Cattle by Lidia Afrilita and David Darmadi

- Blencong Award

Diary of Cattle by Lidia Afrilita and David Darmadi
