= Yulia Evina Bhara =

Indonesian film producer (born 1982)

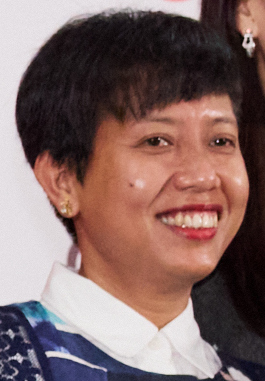
- Bhara in 2025
- Born: Yulia Evina Bhara; 1 July 1982 (age 44); Way Kanan, Lampung, Indonesia
- Occupations: Film producer; theatrical producer
- Years active: 2005–present

Yulia Evina Bhara (born 1 July 1982) is an Indonesian film and theatre producer. She founded production company KawanKawan Media in 2016, which focuses on film production and international co-production.

== Career ==
Bhara began her career by self-teaching herself to produce theater performances, mostly focusing on historical and humanitarian themes. In 2016, her feature producing debut, Solo, Solitude, had its world premiere at the 69th Locarno Film Festival during the Filmmakers of the Present section. In 2019, she produced Yosep Anggi Noen's third feature film The Science of Fictions, which she was nominated for Citra Award for Best Picture at the 2020 Indonesian Film Festival. She produced her first documentary feature film, You and I in 2020, which premiered at the DMZ International Documentary Film Festival. In 2021, Bhara made her international co-producing debut for Filipino disaster drama film Whether the Weather Is Fine.

In 2022, she produced Makbul Mubarak's directorial debut film, Autobiography, which had its world premiere at the 79th Venice International Film Festival. The film was selected as the Indonesian entry for the Best Foreign Language Film at the 96th Academy Awards but it was not nominated. In 2023, Bhara was picked as one of Variety's Impactful International Women of the year. She co-produced Amanda Nell Eu's directorial debut film Tiger Stripes, which won the Critics' Week Grand Prize.

In 2025, she served as a jury for the Critics' Week at the 2025 Cannes Film Festival and for the Proxima Competition at the 59th Karlovy Vary International Film Festival. In September, Bhara also served as a member of the Competition Jury at the 30th Busan International Film Festival.

== Filmography ==
Bhara was a producer in all films unless otherwise noted.

Year	Film	Credit
2016	Solo, Solitude	
2019	The Science of Fictions	
2020	You and I	
2021	Whether the Weather Is Fine	Co-producer
2022	Stone Turtle	Co-producer
2022	Autobiography	
2023	24 Hours with Gaspar	
2023	Tiger Stripes	Co-producer
2023	Dreaming & Dying	Co-producer
2023	Last Shadow at First Light	Co-producer
2024	Don't Cry, Butterfly	Co-producer
2024	Tale of the Land	
2025	Renoir	Co-producer
2025	The Fox King	
2026	Hearing	Co-producer
2026	The House on the Moon	Co-producer
TBA	The Drought	Co-producer
TBA	Jilah and the Man with Two Names	
TBA	Malice	
TBA	Songsmith	
TBA	Voice of Baceprot	
TBA	Watch It Burn	

Short films

Year	Film	Credit
2016	On the Origin of Fear	
2018	Mist of the Past	Co-producer
2021	West Love	Executive producer
2026	And If Thuy Didn't Exist	Co-producer
