= 16th Asia Pacific Screen Awards =

Film awards ceremony

- Awarded for: Excellence in cinema and performance in Asia Pacific region
- Awarded by: Asia Pacific Screen Academy
- Presented by: UNESCO; FIAPF
- Date: 3 November 2023
- Site: Home of the Arts, Gold Coast, Australia
- Official website: www.asiapacificscreenawards.com

Highlights
- Best Film: Perfect Days
- Most nominations: Evil Does Not Exist (4)

The 16th Asia Pacific Screen Awards was held on 3 November 2023 at the Home of the Arts, Gold Coast, Queensland, Australia, to recognize the best in cinema of the Asia Pacific Region of 2023. Wim Wenders' Perfect Days received the Best Film award.

The nominations were announced on 3 October 2023. Ryusuke Hamaguchi's Evil Does Not Exist led the nominations with four, followed by Snow Leopard with three.

== Jury ==
The juries were composed of:

International jury

- Clara Law – Hong Kong film director
- Yeo Yann Yann – Malaysian actress
- Anna Katchko – German film producer
- Hidedo Urata – Japanese cinematographer
- Faisal Baltyuor – CEO of Muvi Studios

International nominations council

- Beena Paul – Indian film editor
- Anderson Le – artistic director of the Hawaii International Film Festival
- Delphine Garde-Mroueh – film curator and researcher
- Gulnara Abikeyeva, Kazakh film critic and researcher
- John Badalu – film curator and director
- Kiki Fung, programmer of Hong Kong International Film Festival
- Yoshi Yatabe – film curator

Youth, Animation, Documentary international jury

- Midi Z – Taiwanese filmmaker, writer, and producer
- Rima Das – Indian writer, director, and producer
- Hikaru Toda – Japanese documentary maker

Youth, Animation, Documentary nominations council

- Faramarz K-Rahber, Iranian-Australian filmmaker
- Carl Joseph Papa, Filipino animation filmmaker
- Zoe Sua Cho, Korean-New Zealander filmmaker

== Winners and nominees ==
The nominations were announced on 3 October 2023. The winners are listed first and in bold.

**Best Film**: **Perfect Days – Wim Wenders (Japan)**; Citizen Saint – Tinatin Kajrishvili (Georgia, France, Bulgaria); Evil Does Not Exist – Ryusuke Hamaguchi (Japan); Qas – Aisultan Seitov (Kazakhstan); Snow Leopard – Pema Tseden (China)	**Best Director**: **Celine Song – Past Lives**; Darkhan Tulegenov – Brothers; Liang Ming – Carefree Days; Rima Das – Tora's Husband; Ryusuke Hamaguchi – Evil Does Not Exist
**Best Performance**: **Mouna Hawa – Inshallah a Boy as Nawal**; Kōji Yakusho – Perfect Days as Hirayama; Jinpa – Snow Leopard as Jinpa; Mihaya Shirata – Last Shadow at First Light as Ami; Zhou Dongyu – The Breaking Ice as Nana	**Best Youth Film**: **Bauryna Salu – Askhat Kuchinchirekov (Kazakhstan)**; Blueback – Robert Connolly; A House in Jerusalem – Muayad Alayan (Palestine, United Kingdom, Qatar, Netherlands, Germany); Monster – Hirokazu Kore-eda (Japan); Tiger Stripes – Amanda Nell Eu (Malaysia, Taiwan, Singapore, France, Germany, Netherlands, Indonesia, Qatar)
**Best Animated Film**: **The Siren – Sepideh Farsi (France, Germany, Luxembourg, Belgium)**; Deep Sea – Tian Xiaopeng (China); The First Slam Dunk – Takehiko Inoue (Japan); Scarygirl – Ricard Cussó (Australia); Suzume – Makoto Shinkai (Japan)	**Best Documentary Film**: **Against the Tide – Sarvnik Kaur (India, France)**; Beyond Utopia – Madeleine Gavin (United States); Man in Black – Wang Bing (France, United States, United Kingdom); Nam June Paik: Moon Is the Oldest TV – Amanda Kim (United States, South Korea); To Kill a Tiger – Nisha Pahuja (Canada)
**Best Screenplay**: **Riceboy Sleeps – Anthony Shim**; Carefree Days – Liang Ming; Last Shadow at First Light – Nicole Midori Woodford; Snow Leopard – Pema Tseden; Evil Does Not Exist – Ryusuke Hamaguchi	**Best Cinematography**: **Qas – Azamat Dulatov**; **Citizen Saint – Krum Rodriguez (Special Mention)**; A Song Sung Blue – Hao Jiayue; Whispers of Fire & Water – Kenneth Cyrus; Evil Does Not Exist – Yoshio Kitagawa
**Best New Performance**: **Aibar Saly and Alisher Ismailov – Brothers**	**Jury Grand Prize**: **Evil Does Not Exist – Ryusuke Hamaguchi (Japan)**
**Young Cinema Award**: **Inside the Yellow Cocoon Shell – Phạm Thiên Ân**	**FIAPF Award**: **Jeremy Chua**
**Cultural Diversity Award** **(under the patronage of UNESCO)**: **Rapture – Dominic Megam Sangma (India, China, Qatar, Switzerland, Netherlands)**
