= Mariko Tsutsui =

Japanese actress (born 1960)

- 筒井 真理子
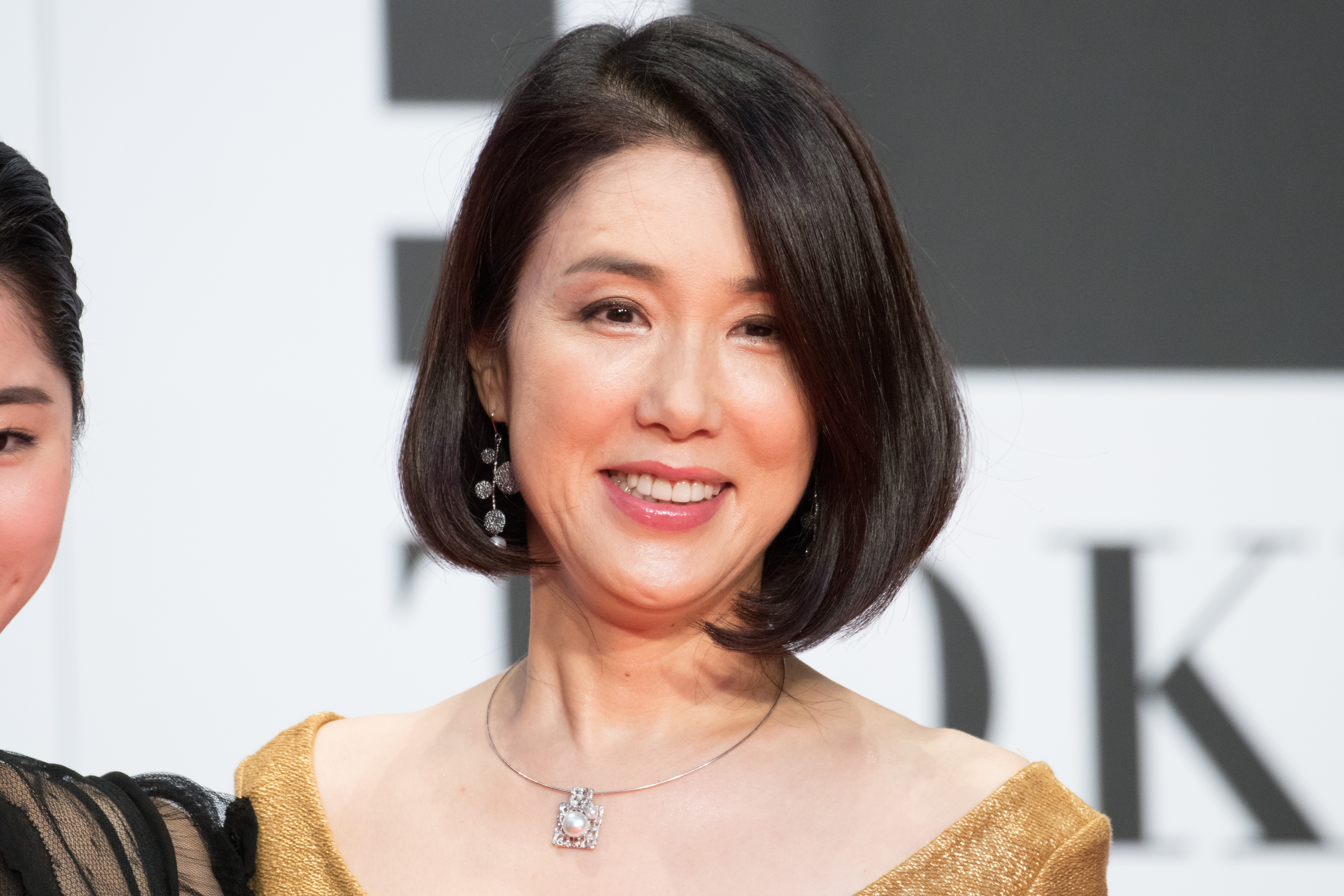
- Born: 13 October 1960 (age 66); Kōfu, Yamanashi Prefecture, Japan
- Occupation: Actress
- Years active: 1985–present
- Agent: Tristone Entertainment
- Website: Mariko Tsutsui official site

Mariko Tsutsui (筒井 真理子, Tsutsui Mariko; born October 13, 1960) is a Japanese actress.

== Personal life ==
She was born in Kōfu, Yamanashi Prefecture.

Tsutsui graduated from Kōfu Daiichi High School in Yamanashi Prefecture. She dropped out of Aoyama Gakuin University. She later graduated from the Waseda University School of Social Sciences.

As well as acting, Tsutsui can figure skate, play the flute, and perform Japanese buyō (dance).

In 1981, while studying at Aoyama Gakuin University, she was impressed after seeing a performance of the Third Stage performing at the Waseda University Theater Study Group. In 1982, when she took the examination at the Waseda University again, she passed and joined the Third Stage where she performed her first role. She appeared subsequently in most works performed by the theatre company.

== Filmography ==
=== Film ===
Date	Title	Role	Notes	Ref.
1994	Otoko Tomodachi	Eriko Oda	Lead role	
2016	Harmonium	Fumie Suzuoka		
2019	A Girl Missing	Ichiko / Risa	Lead role	
2020	Godai: The Wunderkind			
2021	Between Us			
2021	Will I Be Single Forever?			
2022	Bldg. N			
2022	No Place to Go			
2023	Ripples	Yoriko Sudō	Lead role	
2023	Analog	Junko Shiina		
2023	#Mito	Kimura		
2023	The Quiet Yakuza Part 1	Tae		
2023	The Quiet Yakuza Part 2	Tae		
2023	Wheels and Axle			
2023	Last Shadow at First Light	Ami's mother		
2024	The Quiet Yakuza 2: Part 1	Tae		
2024	The Quiet Yakuza 2: Part 2	Tae		
2025	True Beauty: After	Ruriko Kaburagi		
2025	Love Song	Yasuko Hiroki	Thai-Japanese film	
2025	See You Again			
2025	Meets the World	Yukari's mother		
2025	The Deepest Space In Us			
2025	Dawn Chorus	Noriko	Lead role	
2026	Euthanasia Special Zone			

=== Television ===
Year	Title	Role	Notes	Ref.
1999	Keizoku	Yukari Aoki	Episode 5	
2014	Hanako and Anne	Tami Yamamoto	Asadora	
2024	House of Ninjas	Hitoko Mukai		
2024	The Tiger and Her Wings	Hisako Sakuragawa	Asadora	
2024	Laughing Matryoshka	Kaori Michiue		
2025	Love is too Hard for a Rich Man	Kaori Shinonome		
2025	A Calm Sea and Beautiful Days with You	Mitsuko Hashimoto		
2025	Love School	Sanae Ogawa		
2026	Blossom	Yoshiko Kamiyama	Asadora	

=== Video games ===
Date	Title	Role	Notes	Ref.
2022	The Centennial Case: A Shijima Story	Yayoi Kasuga / Kinu Kotomiya		

== Awards and nominations ==
Year	Ceremony	Award	Work	Result	Ref.
2017	38th Yokohama Film Festival	Best Actress	Harmonium	Won	
2017	31st Takasaki Film Festival	Best Actress	Harmonium	Won	
2017	71st Mainichi Film Awards	Best Actress	Harmonium	Won	
2024	17th Asian Film Awards	Best Supporting Actress	Last Shadow at First Light	Nominated	
