= Amanda Nell Eu =

Malaysian film director

- Born: 26 November 1985 (age 40); Kuala Lumpur, Malaysia
- Occupations: Film director, screenwriter
- Years active: 2012–present

Amanda Nell Eu (born November 26, 1985) is a Malaysian film director and screenwriter. She is known for her film Tiger Stripes. The film was shown at the 2023 Cannes Film Festival on 17 May 2023 where it won the Critics' Week Grand Prize. It was selected as the Malaysian entry for the Best International Feature Film at the 96th Academy Awards.

== Early life and education ==
Eu was born in Kuala Lumpur on 25 November 1985. When she was 11, she moved to Britain where her grandmother originated. She went to a boarding school in High Wycombe. She then studied graphic design at Central Saint Martins before attending London Film School.

Eu also studied at the Filmmakers Academy in Locarno at the course led by Stefano Knuchel.

== Career ==
After she graduated from the London Film School with an MA, she made two short films, Pasak (2012) and Seesaw (2015). She returned to settle in Malaysia. She became interested in the folklore of the country and made two short films based on characters from such lore. The first made in 2017 was It's Easier to Raise Cattle, a story involving a pontianak, which premiered in competition at the Venice International Film Festival and received a Special Mention at the International Short Film Festival Clermont-Ferrand. She also made the short films Fu Xin De Ren in 2017 and Vinegar Baths (involving a penanggalan) in 2018.

Eu directed her first feature film Tiger Stripes released in 2023. The film won the Critics' Week Grand Prize at the Cannes Film Festival. In 2025, her second feature film Lotus Feet was selected for the International Film Festival Rotterdam (IFFR)’s Hubert Bals Fund (HBF) development support scheme.

Eu was also formerly the drummer for the London-based alternative rock band, Screaming Tea Party.

== Works ==
=== Short film ===
Year	Title	Director	Writer	Notes
2012	Pasak	Yes	Yes	
2015	Seesaw	Yes	No	
2017	Lagi Senang Jaga Sekandang Lembu	Yes	Yes	
2017	Fu Xin De Ren	Yes	Yes	
2018	Vinegar Baths	Yes	Yes	

=== Feature film ===
Year	Title	Director	Writer	Notes
2023	Tiger Stripes	Yes	Yes	
TBA	Lotus Feet	Yes	Yes	

== Awards and nominations ==
Award / Organization / Film festival	Year	Category	Nominated work	Result	Ref(s)
HACTION! Shot on Lumix GH5	2017	—N/a	Fu Xin De Ren	3rd place	
Singapore International Film Festival	2017	Best Southeast Asian Short Film	Lagi Senang Jaga Sekandang Lembu	Nominated	
Venice International Film Festival	2017	Orizzonti - Short Films Competition	Lagi Senang Jaga Sekandang Lembu	Nominated	
Regensburg Short Film Week	2018	Best International Short Film	Lagi Senang Jaga Sekandang Lembu	Nominated	
Scream Asia	2019	Horror Short Film Competition	Vinegar Baths	1st place	
Southeast Asian International Short Film Festival	2019	Next New Wave Award	Vinegar Baths	Won	
Southeast Asian International Short Film Festival	2019	Best Cinematography	Vinegar Baths	Won	
Asia Pacific Screen Awards	2023	Best Youth Film	Tiger Stripes	Nominated	
BFI London Film Festival	2023	First Feature Competition - Sutherland Trophy	Tiger Stripes	Nominated	
Cannes Film Festival	2023	Critics' Week - Grand Prize	Tiger Stripes	Won	
Cannes Film Festival	2023	Caméra d'Or	Tiger Stripes	Nominated	
Cannes Film Festival	2024	Women In Motion - Emerging Talent Award (Note: Co-presented by Kering)	Herself	Won	
Fantasia Film Festival	2023	Cheval Noir - Best Film	Tiger Stripes	Nominated	
Fantasia Film Festival	2023	New Flesh - Special Mention	Tiger Stripes	Won	
Fantasy Filmfest	2023	Fresh Blood Award	Tiger Stripes	Nominated	
Hamptons International Film Festival	2023	Golden Starfish Award - Narrative Feature	Tiger Stripes	Nominated	
Hong Kong Asian Film Festival	2023	New Talent Award	Tiger Stripes	Nominated	
Jogja-NETPAC Asian Film Festival	2023	Golden Hanoman Award	Tiger Stripes	Nominated	
Munich Film Festival	2023	CineRebels Award	Tiger Stripes	Nominated	
Neuchâtel International Fantastic Film Festival	2023	Narcisse Award - Best Feature Film	Tiger Stripes	Won	
Pingyao International Film Festival	2023	Gala-Best Film	Tiger Stripes	Nominated	
QCinema International Film Festival	2023	Asian Next Wave Competition - Best Picture	Tiger Stripes	Won	
QCinema International Film Festival	2023	Best Director	Tiger Stripes	Won	
São Paulo International Film Festival	2023	New Directors Competition - Best Fiction	Tiger Stripes	Nominated	
Sitges Film Festival	2023	Official Competition - Best Feature Film	Tiger Stripes	Nominated	
Taipei Film Festival	2023	International New Talent Competition - Grand Prize	Tiger Stripes	Nominated	
Tokyo FILMeX	2023	Grand Prize	Tiger Stripes	Nominated	
Asian Film Awards	2024	Best New Director	Tiger Stripes	Nominated	
Palm Springs International Film Festival	2024	FIPRESCI - Best International Film	Tiger Stripes	Nominated	
Sun Valley Film Festival	2024	Best Narrative Feature Film	Tiger Stripes	Won	
