= Abracadabra (2019 film) =

- Theatrical release poster
- Directed by: Faozan Rizal
- Screenplay by: Faozan Rizal
- Produced by: Ifa Isfansyah; Justin Deimen
- Starring: Reza Rahadian
- Cinematography: Gandang Warah
- Edited by: Ahmad Fesdi Anggoro; Greg Araya; Helmi Nur Rasyid
- Music by: Krisna Purna
- Production companies: Fourcolours Films; HOOQ; Ideosource Entertainment; Aurora Media; WOA Entertainment; Focused Equipment
- Release dates: 19 November 2019 (JAFF); 9 January 2020 (Indonesia)
- Running time: 86 minutes
- Countries: Indonesia; Singapore
- Language: Indonesian
- Budget: $400,000
- Box office: Rp 500 million ($35,038)

Abracadabra is a 2019 black comedy fantasy film, directed and written by Faozan Rizal. The film stars Reza Rahadian as Lukman, a magician who tries to bring back a little boy who vanishes from his magic box.

The film had its world premiere at the 14th Jogja-NETPAC Asian Film Festival. It was theatrically released on 9 January 2020.

== Premise ==
Lukman, a magician, tries to make a little boy vanishing from his magic box as his swan song. Unexpectedly, he cannot make the boy come back to the stage. Abracadabra follows Lukman's journey to bring back the vanishing boy.

== Cast ==
- Reza Rahadian as Lukman
- Butet Kertaradjasa as chief of police
- Salvita Decorte as Sofnila
- Ence Bagus as police
- Imam Darto as police
- Dewi Irawan as Ashima
- Jajang C. Noer as Savitri
- Egy Fadly as Barnas
- Lukman Sardi as Lindu
- Poppy Sovia as Winda
- Paul Agusta as Zakaria
- Landung Simatupang as Lukito
- Veronika Krasnasari as twin astrologer
- Valerie Krasnadewi as twin astrologer
- Asmara Abigail as Laila
- Muhammad Adhiyat as Iwan
- Mbok Tun as Rawit
- Mohammad Marzuki as Marjuki
- Yati Pesek as Sutini
- Yan Widjaya as Master Wong

== Production ==
Director Faozan Rizal conceived the idea of Abracadabra in 2017. To Rizal, magic world and cinema served as worlds where "he could live in his own imagination".

The filming took place in Yogyakarta.

== Release ==
Abracadabra had its world premiere as the opening film of 14th Jogja-NETPAC Asian Film Festival on 19 November 2019. It was theatrically released on 9 January 2020. During its run at the theatres, the film garnered 12,523 moviegoers and grossed Rp 500 million ($35,038).

== Accolades ==
| Award | Date | Category | Recipient | Result | Ref. |
|---|---|---|---|---|---|
| Bandung Film Festival | 14 November 2020 | Best Cinematography | Gandang Warah | Nominated | |
| Bandung Film Festival | 14 November 2020 | Best Production Design | Vida Sylvia Pasaribu | Nominated | |
| Citra Awards | 5 December 2020 | Best Director | Faozan Rizal | Nominated | |
| Citra Awards | 5 December 2020 | Best Actor | Reza Rahadian | Nominated | |
| Citra Awards | 5 December 2020 | Best Supporting Actor | Butet Kertaradjasa | Nominated | |
| Citra Awards | 5 December 2020 | Best Sound | Khrisna Purna Ratmara and Dicky Permana | Nominated | |
| Citra Awards | 5 December 2020 | Best Production Design | Vida Sylvia Pasaribu | Won | |
| Citra Awards | 5 December 2020 | Best Cinematography | Gandang Warah | Nominated | |
| Citra Awards | 5 December 2020 | Best Makeup and Hairstyling | Eba Sheba | Won | |
| Citra Awards | 5 December 2020 | Best Costume Design | Hagai Pakan | Won | |
| Citra Awards | 5 December 2020 | Best Visual Effects | Amrin Nugraha | Nominated | |
| Maya Awards | 6-7 March 2021 | Best Feature Film | Ifa Isfansyah and Justin Deimen | Nominated | |
| Maya Awards | 6-7 March 2021 | Best Director | Faozan Rizal | Nominated | |
| Maya Awards | 6-7 March 2021 | Best Actor | Reza Rahadian | Nominated | |
| Maya Awards | 6-7 March 2021 | Best Supporting Actor | Butet Kertaradjasa | Nominated | |
| Maya Awards | 6-7 March 2021 | Best Cinematography | Gandang Warah | Won | |
| Maya Awards | 6-7 March 2021 | Best Sound | Khrisna Purna Ratmara and Dicky Permana | Nominated | |
| Maya Awards | 6-7 March 2021 | Best Poster Design | Yazied Syafa'at and Dian Ariya Nusantara | Nominated | |
| Maya Awards | 6-7 March 2021 | Best Original Score | Krisna Purna | Nominated | |
| Maya Awards | 6-7 March 2021 | Best Costume Design | Hagai Pakan | Won | |
| Maya Awards | 6-7 March 2021 | Best Makeup and Hairstyling | Eba Sheba | Won | |
| Maya Awards | 6-7 March 2021 | Best Production Design | Vida Sylvia Pasaribu | Won | |
| Maya Awards | 6-7 March 2021 | Best Visual Effects | Amrin Nugraha | Nominated | |
