= Tiger Stripes (film) =

2023 film by Amanda Nell Eu

- Promotional release poster
- Directed by: Amanda Nell Eu
- Written by: Amanda Nell Eu
- Produced by: Foo Fei Ling; Patrick Mao Huang; Fran Borgia; Juliette Lepoutre; Pierre Menahem; Jonas Weydemann; Ellen Havenith; Yulia Evina Bhara
- Starring: Zafreen Zairizal; Deena Ezral; Piqa; Shaheizy Sam; June Lojong; Khairunazwan Rodz; Fatimah Abu Bakar
- Cinematography: Jimmy Gimferrer
- Edited by: Carlo Francisco Manatad
- Music by: Gabber Modus Operandi
- Production company: Ghost Grrrl Pictures
- Release date: 17 May 2023 (Cannes)
- Running time: 95 minutes
- Countries: Malaysia; Taiwan; Singapore; France; Germany; Netherlands; Indonesia; Qatar
- Language: Malay
- Budget: €834,000
- Box office: €29,200

Tiger Stripes is a 2023 independent body horror film written and directed by Amanda Nell Eu in her directorial debut, starring Zafreen Zarizai, Deena Ezral and Piqa with Shaheizy Sam, June Lojong, Khairunazwan Rodz and Fatimah Abu Bakar in supporting roles. The film's plot follows an 12-year-old Zaffan whose body begins to undergo unsettling changes upon hitting puberty.

Tiger Stripes had its world premiere at the 2023 Cannes Film Festival on 17 May 2023 where it won the Critics' Week Grand Prize. An international co-production of eight countries including Malaysia, the film was selected as the Malaysian entry for the Best International Feature Film at the 96th Academy Awards. The film was released in Malaysia censored, and the director has disowned the censored version of the film.

== Plot ==
All-girls' elementary school student Nur Zaffan binti Azman starts developing mature interests, such as doing suggestive dances in the bathroom and wearing a bra, accompanied by fellow students Mariam and prefect Farah binti Muhamad Zaid. Zaffan is exposed when teacher Azizah forces her to open the bathroom door and is thus admonished by headteacher Sabariah. Zaffan plays at a stream in a jungle with Farah and Mariam and is chased out of her house by her overbearing mother Munah for returning in underwear as she had wet her uniform. One night, Zaffan begins her menarche while sleeping.

Zaffan's menstruation prevents her from attending mandatory prayers; Farah warns her about the legend of Ina, a pink-eyed demonic woman who became feral and lived in the jungle due to her period. Zaffan later witnesses the Ina, whom the others could not see, on top of a tree, which Farah ridicules her for. The next day, Zaffan menstruates again in class, entering puberty as she develops acne and begins shedding her nails, forcing her to wear gloves.

After Mariam turns down Zaffan's offer to walk home with her, Zaffan, inspired, requests her father Azman to let her join the Girl Guides for a school program. Zaffan witnesses the Ina again one night at camp, and the next day, she rescues a student, Liyana, who hid on top of a tree to avoid being bullied by the seniors, earning a badge during the exam results announcement ceremony. Farah grows jealous at Zaffan as a result, believing she is trying to emulate her. Munah admonishes Zaffan again for wearing gloves even at home.

Zaffan gains the ability to transform into a weretiger-like beast when angry, killing a frog with her bare hands. One day, Farah and her clique assault and patronize her in the bathroom over her promiscuous fantasies, knowing about her menstruations. As Zaffan transforms, she starts losing her hair and growing claws, inducing mass hysteria within students and teachers in her presence, though Zaffan escapes to start climbing trees. Zaffan returns that evening to find that the upper floor bathrooms were locked afterwards. Subsequently, the school hires publicity-seeking faith healer Dr. Rahim to investigate, and rumors circulate about the bathroom assault. Later that night, Zaffan gains a preference for eating animals.

During a foot drill, Farah collapses hysterically, claiming she had been possessed as Rahim rushes to the scene. Later, Zaffan senses that Mariam is also about to reach puberty. Mariam later spots Zaffan bathing at the stream before calling for Zaffan, who initially shuts her out, but confesses her desire to leave school and reveals her tiger form to Mariam. Mariam then agrees to stay beside Zaffan near the jungle.

Zaffan fights Munah over her wish to leave school, so Munah desperately promises Azman nothing would hurt her; Zaffan's eyes flash pink while sleeping. Next day, Rahim visits their village and approaches Zaffan's parents. He prepares to exorcise Zaffan at his treatment center with Farah and Mariam in attendance, goading them into sitting beside Zaffan. Rahim initially fails to force Zaffan to transform, threatening to banish her if she refuses. An audience member exposes Rahim as a fraud after Mariam defends Zaffan. In response, Rahim sprays and spits water at Zaffan, then gets his assistants to assault her. A transformed Zaffan kills Rahim, leaving behind his severed head before retreating to the jungle. Mariam attempts to follow Zaffan, but is dragged away as Farah is left wailing hysterically.

Sometime later, Sabariah launches a curfew, and mandates students to be accompanied by their legal guardians while traveling to and from the school. Mariam, who now wears gloves, and a now-demoted Farah find that Zaffan has successfully left school; Munah hopes for Zaffan's return. At night, Mariah and Farah come to play and live with Zaffan in the jungle, signifying that they have begun menstruating. Mariam accidentally scratches and wounds Farah's leg, revealing herself as a tiger. She then films Zaffan dancing at the stream.

== Cast ==
- Zafreen Zairizal as Zaffan
- Deena Ezral as Farah, a classmate of Zaffan who turns to bullying her.
- Piqa as Mariam, a classmate of Zaffan.
- Shaheizy Sam as Dr. Rahim, snake-oil exorcist
- June Lojong as Munah, Zaffan's mother.
- Khairunazwan Rodz
- Fatimah Abu Bakar as headteacher Sabariah

== Production ==
The film is an international co-production project involving eight countries, including Weydemann Bros from Berlin, Germany, Foo Fei Ling of Ghost Grrrl Pictures from Malaysia, Fran Borgia of Akanga Film Asia from Singapore, and Yulia Evina Bhara of KawanKawan Media from Indonesia. The development of the film began in 2017. During its production, Tiger Stripes had collected seven project development credits, including Open Doors Locarno Festival, Network of Asian Fantastic Films, Talents Tokyo, NMSP Project Development Fund, Hubert Bals Fund Bright Future, Less Is More event, and SEAFIC Lab.

== Release ==
The film had its world premiere at the 2023 Cannes Film Festival on 17 May 2023. It won the award for Critics' Week Grand Prize. It also competed in the Official selection at the 56th Sitges Film Festival, and served as the closing film of 2023 Jakarta Film Week.

In April 2023, Jour2fête acquired its distribution rights in France.

In Malaysia, the film was released on 19 October 2023 only after it had been censored, which prompted the director to disown the film, saying that the released film was not the film that she made and won the prize in Cannes.

It was also invited at the 29th Busan International Film Festival in 'Special program in focus' Teenage Minds, Teenage Movies section and it will be screened in October 2024.

== Critical reception ==
On the review aggregator website Rotten Tomatoes, 97% of 60 critics' reviews are positive, with an average rating of 6.9/10. The website's consensus reads: "A clever and stylish riff on the body horror that is puberty, Tiger Stripes is an exuberant allegory for personal agency as well as an impressive debut for writer-director Amanda Nell Eu." Metacritic, which uses a weighted average, assigned the film a score of 68 out of 100, based on 11 critics, indicating "generally favorable" reviews.

Fionnuala Halligan of Screen International described the film as "a well observed, fiercely female-centred coming-of-age drama". Peter Bradshaw of The Guardian rated the film with three stars out of five and praised Nell Eu's direction and the younger cast's performances.

== Accolades ==
Award	Year	Category	Result	Ref.
Asia Pacific Screen Awards	2023	Best Youth Film	Nominated	
BFI London Film Festival	2023	First Feature Competition - Sutherland Trophy	Nominated	
Cannes Film Festival	2023	Critics' Week Grand Prix	Won	
Cannes Film Festival	2023	Caméra d'Or	Nominated	
Fantasia Film Festival	2023	Cheval Noir - Best Film	Nominated	
Fantasia Film Festival	2023	New Flesh - Special Mention	Won	
Fantasy Filmfest	2023	Fresh Blood Award	Nominated	
Hamptons International Film Festival	2023	Golden Starfish Award - Narrative Feature	Nominated	
Hong Kong Asian Film Festival	2023	New Talent Award	Nominated	
Jogja-NETPAC Asian Film Festival	2023	Golden Hanoman Award	Nominated	
Munich Film Festival	2023	CineRebels Award	Nominated	
Neuchâtel International Fantastic Film Festival	2023	Narcisse Award - Best Feature Film	Won	
Pingyao International Film Festival	2023	Gala-Best Film	Nominated	
QCinema International Film Festival	2023	Asian Next Wave Competition - Best Picture	Won	
QCinema International Film Festival	2023	Best Director	Won	
São Paulo International Film Festival	2023	New Directors Competition - Best Fiction	Nominated	
Sitges Film Festival	2023	Official Competition - Best Feature Film	Nominated	
Taipei Film Festival	2023	International New Talent Competition - Grand Prize	Nominated	
Tokyo FILMeX	2023	Grand Prize	Nominated	
Asian Film Awards	2024	Best New Director	Nominated	
Palm Springs International Film Festival	2024	FIPRESCI - Best International Film	Nominated	
Sun Valley Film Festival	2024	Best Narrative Feature Film	Won	

== See also ==
- List of submissions to the 96th Academy Awards for Best International Feature Film
- List of Malaysian submissions for the Academy Award for Best International Feature Film
- Turning Red
