= The Science of Fictions =

2019 Indonesian film

- Hiruk Pikuk Si Alkisah
- Directed by: Yosep Anggi Noen
- Written by: Yosep Anggi Noen
- Produced by: Arya Sweta; Edwin Nazir; Yosep Anggi Noen; Yulia Evina Bhara
- Starring: Gunawan Maryanto; Ecky Lamoh; Yudi Ahmad Tajudin; Alex Suhendra; Lukman Sardi; Asmara Abigail; Rusini; Marissa Anita
- Cinematography: Gay Hian Teoh
- Edited by: Ahmad Fesdi Anggoro; Yosep Anggi Noen
- Music by: Yasuhiro Morinaga
- Production companies: Limaenam Films; Angka Fortuna Sinema; KawanKawan Film
- Release dates: 16 August 2019 (Locarno); 10 December 2020 (Indonesia)
- Running time: 106 minutes
- Countries: Indonesia; Malaysia; France
- Language: Indonesian

The Science of Fictions (Indonesian: Hiruk Pikuk Si Alkisah) is a 2019 Indonesian drama film written, directed, produced, and edited by Yosep Anggi Noen. Veteran theater actor Gunawan Maryanto stars as a man whose tongue gets cut off after discovering a film crew shooting a fake moon landing. For his performance, Maryanto won many awards, including the Citra Award for Best Actor and Maya Award for Best Actor in a Leading Role.

== Synopsis ==
During the 1960s, the quiet Siman encounters a foreign film crew filming a fake Moon landing in a desolate part of Indonesia. His tongue is cut out and after this traumatising incident he loses himself in dreams of becoming an astronaut. His muteness and strange, slow-motion gait make him a target for scorn and exploitation. Simultaneously, in the village, a colorful soldier parodies Suharto.

== Cast ==
- Gunawan Maryanto as Siman
- Ecky Lamoh as the actor
- Yudi Ahmad Tajudin as Ndapuk & Tupon
- Alex Suhendra as Wanto & Gun
- Lukman Sardi as Jumik
- Rusini as Sinak
- Asmara Abigail as Nadiyah
- Marissa Anita as kiosk owner
- Rachel Saraswati as Ermi
- Pritt Timothy as Hendri

== Production ==
Noen conceived the idea for the film in 2012 while visiting Gumuk Pasir, an area near Parangkusumo Beach in Bantul, Yogyakarta. The landscape reminded him of the Moon's surface and gave inspired him to write a story set in the 1960s, during which the first ever Moon landing was a major public interest. It took Noen seven years to realize the idea into a feature film, a time span which he spent to develop the screenplay and seek funding.

== Release ==
The film had its world premiere at the Locarno Film Festival in Switzerland in August 2019. It went through months of festival runs abroad before making it to Indonesian theaters in December 2020.

== Reception ==
Upon its screening at Locarno, Marta Bałaga wrote for Cineuropa that the film "can’t quite match its ambitions, failing to keep up the interest and brought down by a terrible, sentimental ending" and that "there is no shaking off a certain feeling of melancholy about the entire thing." Reviewing the film for Screen Anarchy, Martin Cudlac was more positive, calling it "a socio-political parable for the age of fake news" that "approaches a hot topic from a slapsticky angle although satire never breaks through as Anggi Noen keeps tight control over the film´s message." Local critic Dwiki Aprinaldi of Cinema Poetica was more critical of the film. Calling Noen's screenplay "abstract", he wrote that the film "seems to say much while in reality it is just a pretentious oration that revolves around itself".

== Accolades ==
Year	Award	Category	Recipient	Result
2019	Locarno Film Festival	Golden Leopard	Yosep Anggi Noen	Nominated
2019	Locarno Film Festival	Special Mentions	Yosep Anggi Noen	Won
2019	Asia-Pacific Screen Awards	Achievement in Cinematography	Gay Hian Teoh	Nominated
2019	Singapore International Film Festival	Silver Screen Award for Best Asian Feature Film	The Science of Fictions	Nominated
2020	Beijing International Film Festival	Tiantian Award	Yosep Anggi Noen	Nominated
2020	40th Citra Awards	Best Picture	The Science of Fictions	Nominated
2020	40th Citra Awards	Best Director	Yosep Anggi Noen	Nominated
2020	40th Citra Awards	Best Actor	Gunawan Maryanto	Won
2020	40th Citra Awards	Best Supporting Actor	Yudi Ahmad Tajudin	Nominated
2020	40th Citra Awards	Best Original Screenplay	Yosep Anggi Noen	Nominated
2020	40th Citra Awards	Best Editing	Ahmad Fesdi Anggoro Yosep Anggi Noen	Nominated
2020	40th Citra Awards	Best Sound	Hadrianus Eko Sunu; Firman Satyanegara; L. H. Aim Adi Negara; Bagas Oktariyan Ananta; Yasuhiro Morinaga	Nominated
2020	40th Citra Awards	Best Art Direction	Deki Yudhanto	Nominated
2020	40th Citra Awards	Best Makeup & Hairstyling	Anismcaw	Nominated
2020	40th Citra Awards	Best Costume Design	Irmina Kristini	Nominated
2020	Maya Awards	Best Feature Film	The Science of Fictions	Nominated
2020	Maya Awards	Best Director	Yosep Anggi Noen	Won
2020	Maya Awards	Best Actor in a Leading Role	Gunawan Maryanto	Won
2020	Maya Awards	Best New Actor	Yudi Ahmad Tajudin	Nominated
2020	Maya Awards	Best Cinematography	Gay Hian Teoh	Nominated
2020	Maya Awards	Best Art Direction	Deki Yudhanto	Nominated
2020	Maya Awards	Best Sound	Hadrianus Eko Sunu; Firman Satyanegara; L. H. Aim Adi Negara; Bagas Oktariyan Ananta; Yasuhiro Morinaga	Nominated
2020	Maya Awards	Best Makeup & Hairstyling	Anismcaw	Nominated
2020	Maya Awards	Best Costume Design	Irmina Kristini	Nominated
2020	Maya Awards	Best Poster Design	Gandhi Setyawan	Won
