= 15th Jogja-NETPAC Asian Film Festival =

2020 film festival

- Opening film: Mekong 2030 by Anocha Suwichakornpong, Phạm Ngọc Lân, Kulikar Sotho, Anysay Keola, and Sai Naw Kham
- Closing film: You and I by Fanny Chotimah
- Location: Yogyakarta, Indonesia
- Founded: 2006
- Festival date: 25–29 November 2020
- Website: jaff-filmfest.org

Jogja-NETPAC Asian Film Festival
- 16th 14th

The 15th Jogja-NETPAC Asian Film Festival was held on 25 to 29 November 2020 in Yogyakarta, Indonesia. The film screenings were held in person in fifteen cities across Indonesia, alongside online screenings through streaming service KlikFilm.

The festival opened with anthology film Mekong 2030, directed by Anocha Suwichakornpong, Phạm Ngọc Lân, Kulikar Sotho, Anysay Keola, and Sai Naw Kham. It closed with documentary film You and I by Fanny Chotimah. Due to the COVID-19 pandemic, the festival programs were restructured and the competitions were not held.

== Official selection ==
=== Opening and closing films ===
English title	Original title	Director(s)	Production countrie(s)
Mekong 2030 (opening film)		Various: Anocha Suwichakornpong; Phạm Ngọc Lân; Kulikar Sotho; Anysay Keola; Sai Naw Kham	Laos, Thailand, Cambodia, Vietnam
You and I (closing film)		Fanny Chotimah	Indonesia

=== Asian Perspectives ===
English title	Original title	Director(s)	Production countrie(s)
Atbai's Fight	Атбай Шайқасы	Adilkhan Yerzhanov	Kazakhstan
Circa		Adolfo Alix Jr.	Philippines
Cleaners		Glenn Barit	Philippines
Colorless Dreams	Rangsiz tushlar	Ayub Shahobiddinov	Uzbekistan
A Dark, Dark Man	Қап-қара адам	Adilkhan Yerzhanov	Kazakhstan
Debris of Desire	মায়ার জঞ্জাল	Indranil Roychowdhury	India
Do You Think God Loves Immigrant Kids, Mom?	Tanrı Göçmen Çocukları Sever Mi Anne?	Rena Lusin Bitmez	Turkey
Fear(less) and Dear	誠惶（不）誠恐，親愛的	Anson Mak	Hong Kong
The Forbidden Strings		Hasan Noori	Iran
Help Is on the Way		Ismail Fahmi Lubis	Indonesia
A Hundred Years of Happiness		Jakeb Anhvu	Vietnam
Malu	无马之日	Edmund Yeo	Malaysia, Japan
Mañanita		Paul Soriano	Philippines
Najibeh		Mostafa Gandomkar	Iran
Numbness	بی حسی موضعی	Hossein Mahkam	Iran
Tears of Mokpo		Park Ki-yong	South Korea
Where We Belong	ที่ตรงนั้น มีฉันหรือเปล่า	Kongdej Jaturanrasamee	Thailand

=== NETPAC ===
English title	Original title	Director(s)	Production countrie(s)
The Badger	گورکن	Kazem Mollaie	Iran
Biriyaani	ബിരിയാണി	Sajin Baabu	India
Hail, Driver!	Prebet Sapu	Muzzamer Rahman	Malaysia
A Hairy Tail	مسخره باز	Homayoun Ghanizadeh	Iran
Holy Rights		Farha Khatun	India
In My Dream	Bir Düş Gördüm	Murat Çeri	Turkey
John Denver Trending		Arden Rod Condez	Philippines
Just 6.5	متری شیش و نیم	Saeed Roustayi	Iran
Long Day	漫长的一天	Luo Yumo	China
The Love of Tapang Tree		Nova Goh	Malaysia
Newtopia		Audun Amundsen	Indonesia, Norway
School Town King	แร็ปทะลุฝ้า ราชาไม่หยุดฝัน	Wattanapume Laisuwanchai	Thailand
The Tremor	நிலநடுக்கம்	Balaji Vembu Chelli	India
The Warden	سرخ‌پوست	Nima Javidi	Iran
