= Okky Madasari =

Indonesian writer (born 1984)

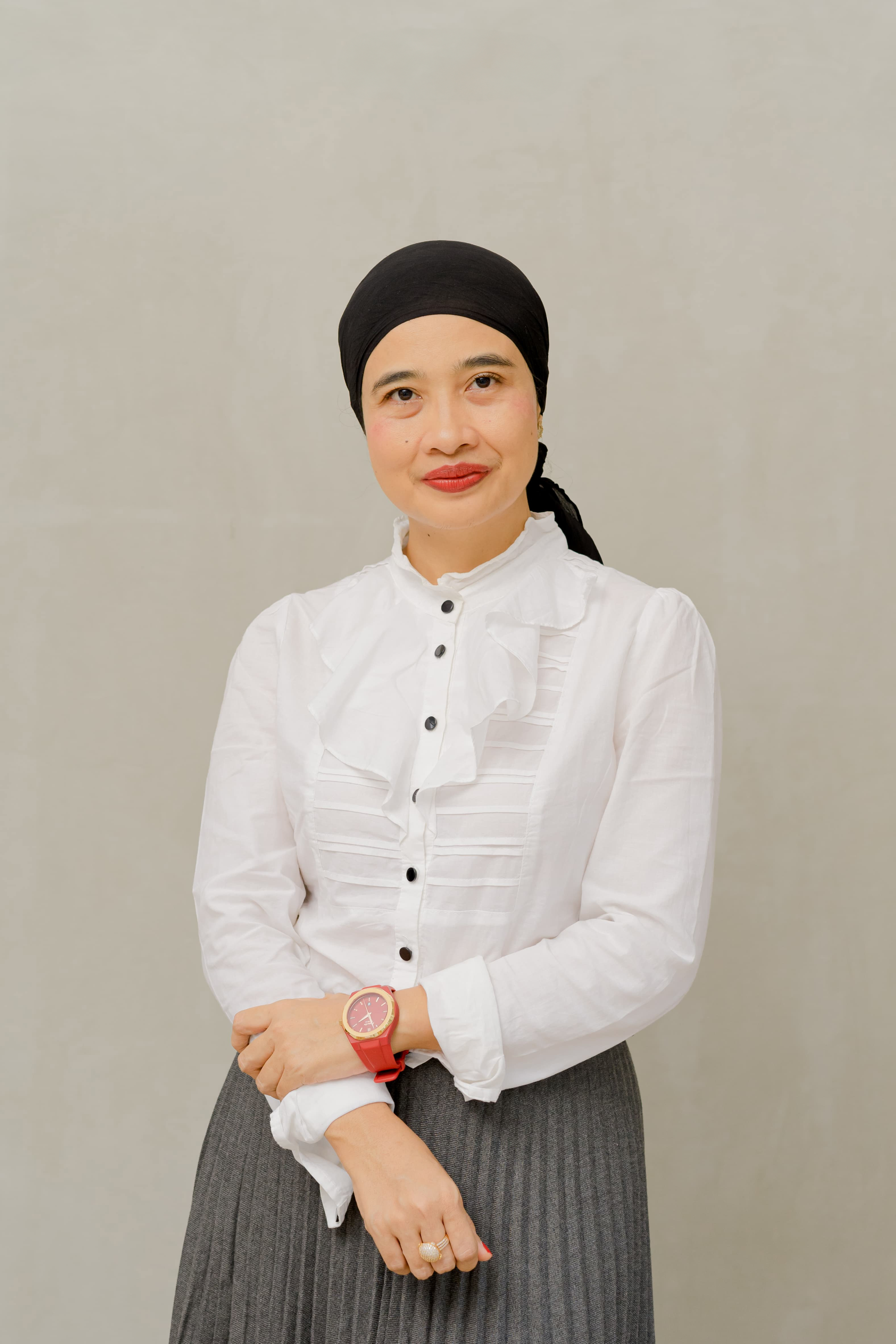
- Okky Madasari in 2024
- Born: 30 October 1984 (age 41); Magetan, Indonesia
- Education: National University of Singapore, University of Indonesia, Gadjah Mada University
- Spouse: Abdul Khalik
- Children: 1
- Writing career
- Language: Indonesian
- Period: 2010–present
- Genres: novel, children's novel, short story, essay
- Subjects: Social Politics, Religion, Women, Sociology
- Notable works: Entrok, Maryam, Pasung Jiwa, Kerumunan Terakhir, Mata series
- Notable awards: Woman in Literature and Freedom of Expression (2025) Sabda Budaya Award (2022) Kompas Best Short Story Nomination (2021) Asia's Women of the Future Award 2019 (Nomination) Khatulistiwa Literary Award (2012)
- Literary movement: 2000s
- Website: okkymadasari.net

Okky Madasari (born 30 October 1984) is an Indonesian author and sociologist known for her portrayals of the social and political conditions in Indonesia. She received the Khatulistiwa Literary Award in 2012 for her novel 'Maryam,' which explores the persecution of Ahmadi Muslims in Indonesia.

== Early years ==
Madasari was born on 30 October 1984, in Magetan, East Java, Indonesia. She graduated from Gadjah Mada University’s International Relations Department in 2005 with a bachelor's degree in political science. After her graduation, she pursued a career as a journalist and writer. In 2012, Madasari undertook a master's program in sociology at the University of Indonesia and graduated in July 2014 with a thesis titled, Genealogi Novel Indonesia: Kapitalisme, Islam dan Sastra Perlawanan (Genealogy of Indonesian Novels: Capitalism, Islam, and Critical Literature).

In August 2019, Madasari began work on her PhD thesis on cultural censorship in Indonesia's post-totalitarian era. She is writing the thesis under a full scholarship from the National University of Singapore.

== Novels ==
Madasari's novels address themes of human rights, social injustice, and political struggles in Indonesia

Apsanti Djokosujatno, a literary critic from the University of Indonesia, has praised Madasari's works, suggesting they may become part of the Indonesian literary canon. Djokosujatno went further to dub Madasari as the next Pramoedya Ananta Toer.

Madasari's first novel, Entrok (2010), is set during the dictatorship of Suharto's regime and details how Indonesians struggled to survive under military oppression. Her second novel, 86 (2011), describes corruption within the country and among its civil servants.

Her third novel, Maryam (2012), focuses on the persecution of Ahmadi Muslims in Indonesia and won a major Indonesian literary prize, the Khatulistiwa Literary Award. At the age of 28, Madasari is the youngest person to win the award. Both of her previous novels had been shortlisted for the award as well. Maryam was translated into English and released under the title of The Outcast in March 2014.

Her fourth novel, Pasung Jiwa, released in May 2013, addresses an individual's struggle to break free from their limitations as well as traditional societal restrictions, and economic dominance by the rich. The novel was shortlisted for the Khatulistiwa Literary Award in 2013. Pasung Jiwa was translated into English under the title Bound in July 2014 and translated into German under the title Gebunden. In 2019, it was translated into Arabic and published in Egypt.

Her fifth novel, Kerumunan Terakhir, was published in May 2016, wherein Madasari explores how digital phenomena and social media can take over people's lives and examines the risk of conflating reality and the virtual world. The novel was translated into English under the title, The Last Crowd.

== Short stories ==
In 2017, Madasari published her first anthology of short stories titled Yang Bertahan dan Binasa Perlahan (Resisting and Fading Away), which covered various issues influential to Indonesia and summarized her short stories of the past decade.

== Children's novels ==
Inspired by her daughter's nightly request for a bedtime story, Madasari began writing children's books in early 2018, and finished her first children's novel, Mata di Tanah Melus ("Mata in the Land of Melus") in the middle of the same year. The novel follows the adventures of 12-year-old Matara and her mother in a fantasy world in Belu, East Nusa Tenggara. The novel is the first of a children's adventure series, called Mata Series. The book has received positive reviews, with some literary analysts noting its contribution to Indonesian children's literature.

The second book in the series, Mata dan Rahasia Pulau Gapi (Mata and the Secret of Gapi Island), is based on Madasari'as trip to Ternate Island. In the novel, Matara and her new friends try to help save the great legacies of Ternate Island, which Madasari establishes as a crucial place in world history.

In early 2019, Madasari published the third novel of the series, Mata dan Manusia Laut (Mata and the Sea People), based on her trip to Wakatobi Island in Southeast Sulawesi. The fourth and final book of the series, called Mata di Dunia Purba (Mata in the Old World) is currently being written.

Each of the three books has become the basis for academic analyses, with different aspects of the book being raised as important for children.

== Non-fiction book ==
In December 2019, Madasari published her first non-fiction book titled Genealogi Sastra Indonesia: Kapitalisme, Islam dan Sastra Perlawanan (Genealogy Indonesian Literature: Capitalism, Islam and Critical Literature) in the form of a free digital book in her official website. Following the book's release, Madasari's website experienced technical issues..

The book was reviewed favorably by some critics, with comparisons drawn to Ariel Heryanto’s 'Perdebatan Sastra Konstektual' (1985)

== Personal views ==
Madasari has written a number of essays on various issues for Indonesian and international media.

In her essay for the Griffith Review titled "Islam, Capitalism and Literature" in 2015, she criticizes the penetration of Islamic fundamentalist teachings into fiction, especially novels. She argues that publishers focus on book sales rather than content and warns of the death of serious literature and the wider exposure of young Indonesians to fundamentalism. She also wrote an article on the same issue for Jakarta Post titled "Questioning Islamic Label of Books and Films," which criticized the use of Islam in cultural products and argued instead that these books and films are not Islamic at all. Madasari also spoke out against pressure for women and girls to wear the hijab in her Jakarta Post article, citing the fact that the authorities require students to wear a hijab in school and stating that those not wearing a hijab faced bullying and threats.

Madasari further criticized rising women's activism driven by strict and fundamentalist interpretation of Islam, stating that such a morally based activism is arbitrary, and is often against public interests.

She has written extensively in opposition to Indonesia’s blasphemy law, arguing that it infringes on human rights. Madasari has called upon the Indonesian government to openly address various past human rights abuses and killings, including the 1965 massacre and the abduction of activists from the 1998 movement against Suharto, especially the Wiji Thukul case. She has demanded the revision of the national curriculum to better address the mass killings of 1965-66 and urges Indonesian authorities to officially acknowledge the massacre, and apologize to the victims.

On regional issues, she believes that a true and genuine bond of people in Southeast Asia can only be achieved through cultural and literary exchanges. She also writes about the Australian intellectual contribution to Indonesia, praising Australian scholars for their influence on the country's critical minds.

In several interviews and speeches, Madasari has stated that she is influenced by Karl Marx and Michel Foucault, but that, above all, she believes in individual freedom and human creativity.

== Academic ==
Madasari graduated from Gadjah Mada University's International Relations Department in 2005 with a bachelor's degree in political science. In 2012, she pursued her master's degree in sociology at the University of Indonesia and graduated in July 2014.

In 2017, Madasari was selected by the US government to represent Indonesia in the International Writing Program at the University of Iowa, US, from August to October 2017, where she engaged in various programs with the local community, including speaking about Indonesia's culture to local and international audiences. That year, the program celebrated its half-century anniversary.

From January to June 2018, Madasari was the resident writer and visiting fellow at the National University of Singapore (NUS). She delivered speeches about literature and society in front of Singaporean audiences at various venues, including schools, art, and community centers.

Madasari is a PhD candidate with the Malay Studies Department of NUS under a research scholarship from the university since 2019. She was also awarded the Dean's Fellowship, an award of the NUS, which is only offered to the top incoming PhD students She is now doing her PhD thesis on censorship and knowledge production in Indonesia after the fall of Suharto. She believes that rather than disappearing, censorship in post-Suharto Indonesia has been more frequent, especially during the Joko Widodo presidency. She has expressed how proud and honored she has been to be with the Malay Studies Department, which she says is among the first, if not the first, to seriously develop social theories by using local and indigenous sources of knowledge as opposed to being dependent on Western sources.

== Global activism ==
In 2017, Madasari was invited to speak at the Berlin International Literature Festival in Germany about her works and Indonesia in general. In 2016, Madasari was invited by University of Warwick in United Kingdom to speak about the role of culture and literature in forging ASEAN prosperity and unity. In 2015, she was invited by the Austrian government to speak at the Islam and Women's Contemporary Literature in Hittisau, Austria. In October of that year, she was one of the Indonesian writers featured at the Frankfurt Book Fair, where Indonesia was the guest of honor. In 2014, she was invited to speak about literature and society at the Douarnenez Film Festival in France.

Madasari has been invited to speak at the Singapore Writer Festival, the Philippine Literary Festival, and Kuala Lumpur Book Fair. She co-founded the ASEAN Literary Festival in 2014 and is the program director of the festival. In 2019, Madasari was nominated for Southeast Asia's Women of the Future Awards for her contributions to the advancement of the region's culture.

== ASEAN Literary Festival ==
In 2014, Madasari co-founded (with Indonesian journalist Abdul Khalik) the ASEAN Literary Festival, which aims to introduce ASEAN writers and their works to the global world and provide a medium for writers to exchange ideas and works. In March 2014, the first ASEAN Literary Festival took place in Jakarta. The festival has gained regional recognition as a platform for literary exchange.

In 2016, the Indonesian police tried to ban the festival by withdrawing the permit it had previously issued due to protests from organisations against the festival's discussions of LGBT issues and the 1965 Communist massacre.

== Expert witness ==
In her commitment to freedom of expression, anti-censorship, and the protection of minorities, Madasari became an expert witness for students of University of Sumatera Utara in a recent censorship case in Sumatera Utara Administrative Court against the university's rector, who dissolved the whole editorial team of a student press, Suara USU, due to the publication of a short story.

== Personal life ==
Madasari is married to Abdul Khalik, a journalist. They met when both of them covered the United Nations Convention against Corruption (UNCAC) in Bali in January 2008. They married in December 2008.

== Bibliography ==
- Entrok/The Years of The Voiceless (2010)
- 86 (2011)
- Maryam/The Outcast (2012)
- Pasung Jiwa/Bound (2013)
- Kerumunan Terakhir/The Last Crowd (2016)
- Yang Bertahan dan Binasa Perlahan (2017)
- Mata di Tanah Melus (2018)
- Mata dan Rahasia Pulau Gapi (2018)
- Mata dan Manusia Laut (2019)
- Genealogi Sastra Indonesia: Kapitalisme, Islam dan Sastra Perlawanan (2019)
- Mata dan Nyala Api Purba (2021)
