= Quitters =

- Theatrical release poster
- Directed by: Noah Pritzker
- Written by: Noah Pritzker; Ben Tarnoff
- Produced by: Luca Borghese; Ben Howe
- Starring: Ben Konigsberg; Greg Germann; Mira Sorvino; Kara Hayward; Morgan Turner; Kieran Culkin
- Cinematography: Jakob Ihre
- Edited by: Beatrice Sisul
- Music by: David Shire
- Production companies: AgX; Frederick & Ashbury; Pretty Moving Pictures
- Distributed by: Momentum Pictures
- Release dates: March 15, 2015 (SXSW); July 22, 2016 (United States)
- Running time: 90 minutes
- Country: United States
- Language: English

Quitters is a 2015 American comedy film directed by Noah Pritzker and written by Noah Pritzker and Ben Tarnoff. The film stars Ben Konigsberg, Greg Germann, Mira Sorvino, Kara Hayward, Morgan Turner and Kieran Culkin. The film was released on July 22, 2016, by Momentum Pictures.

Filmed in San Francisco, the production participated in the San Francisco "Scene in San Francisco Incentive Program" administered by the San Francisco Film Commission.

== Cast ==
- Ben Konigsberg as Clark Rayman
- Greg Germann as Roger
- Mira Sorvino as May Rayman
- Kara Hayward as Etta
- Morgan Turner as Natalia
- Kieran Culkin as Mr. Becker
- Saffron Burrows as Veronica
- Scott Lawrence as Todd
- Jim Breuer
- Ross Turner as Bradley Friedlander
- Katherine Liviakis as Shira
- Carl Lumbly as Dr. Weiss
- George Anagnostou as Steve

== Release ==
The film premiered at South by Southwest on March 15, 2015. The film was released on July 22, 2016, by Momentum Pictures.

== Reception ==
On the review aggregator website Rotten Tomatoes, 44% of nine critics' reviews are positive, with an average rating of 5.1/10. Metacritic, which uses a weighted average, assigned the film a score of 51 out of 100, based on five critics, indicating "mixed or average" reviews.
