= 24 Hours with Gaspar =

2023 crime drama film

- Release poster
- Indonesian: 24 Jam bersama Gaspar
- Directed by: Yosep Anggi Noen
- Written by: M. Irfan Ramli
- Produced by: Yulia Evina Bhara; Cristian Imanuell
- Starring: Reza Rahadian; Shenina Cinnamon; Laura Basuki; Dewi Irawan; Kristo Immanuel; Sal Priadi; Iswadi Pratama
- Cinematography: Teoh Gay Hian
- Edited by: Akhmad Fesdi Anggoro
- Music by: Ricky Lionardi
- Production companies: KawanKawan Media; Visinema Pictures; Legacy Pictures
- Distributed by: Netflix
- Release dates: 6 October 2023 (Busan); 14 March 2024
- Running time: 98 minutes
- Country: Indonesia
- Language: Indonesian

24 Hours with Gaspar is a 2023 Indonesian crime drama film directed by Yosep Anggi Noen, based on the 2017 novel of the same name by Sabda Armandio. The film stars Reza Rahadian as the titular character, a detective who investigates the mysterious disappearance of his childhood friend in the last day of his life.

24 Hours with Gaspar had its world premiere at the 28th Busan International Film Festival on 6 October 2023.

== Plot ==
Set across a single day, the story follows the lead character, a private detective, who has 24 hours to live. He encounters personal dilemmas that lead him to critical realizations about himself and his relationships.

== Cast ==
- Reza Rahadian as Gaspar
  - Ali Fikry as 11-year-old Gaspar
- Shenina Cinnamon as Agnes
- Laura Basuki as Kik
- Kristo Immanuel as Njet
- Sal Priadi as Yadi
- Dewi Irawan as Ms. Tati
- Iswadi Pratama as Wan Ali
- Shofia Shireen as Kirana

== Production ==
During the Visinema Week in 2021 which showcased upcoming production of the company, it was revealed that the novel 24 Hours with Gaspar would be adapted into a film with Noen set to direct. In 2022, the production received the CJ ENM Award at the Asian Project Market, resulting in the acquisition of $10,000 in funding. In an interview with Deadline, Noen revealed that he was approached himself by the founder of Visinema Pictures, Angga Dwimas Sasongko to direct the adaptation.

Principal photography took place in Semarang, Central Java, Indonesia.

=== Casting ===
The cast of the film was announced in a teaser video on 15 August 2022, including Reza Rahardian, Shenina Cinnamon, Laura Basuki, Kristo Immanuel, Sal Priadi, and Dewi Irawan.

== Release ==
24 Hours with Gaspar had its world premiere at the 28th Busan International Film Festival on 6 October 2023, competing for Kim Jiseok Award. The trailer was released on 26 September 2023, ten days prior to the premiere.

The film was scheduled to be screened in Indonesian cinemas in 2024. However, the plan was scrapped as Netflix acquired its distribution rights, releasing it on 14 March 2024.

== Reception ==
=== Critical response ===
Allan Hunter of Screen Daily described the film as "stylishly executed", but criticized that it "could use a bit more clarity" in its narrative.

=== Accolades ===
| Film festival or award | Date of ceremony | Category | Recipient(s) | Result | Ref. |
|---|---|---|---|---|---|
| Busan International Film Festival | 13 October 2023 | Kim Jiseok Award | Yosep Anggi Noen | Nominated | |
| Indonesian Film Festival | 14 November 2023 | Best Picture | Cristian Imanuell and Yulia Evina Bhara | Nominated | |
| Indonesian Film Festival | 14 November 2023 | Best Director | Yosep Anggi Noen | Nominated | |
| Indonesian Film Festival | 14 November 2023 | Best Supporting Actress | Dewi Irawan | Nominated | |
| Indonesian Film Festival | 14 November 2023 | Best Adapted Screenplay | M. Irfan Ramli | Won | |
| Indonesian Film Festival | 14 November 2023 | Best Art Direction | Ahmad "Mbah" Zulkarnaen | Nominated | |
| Indonesian Film Festival | 14 November 2023 | Best Visual Effects | Naradhipa | Nominated | |
| Indonesian Film Festival | 14 November 2023 | Best Sound | Wahyu Tri Purnomo and LH Aim Adi Negara | Nominated | |
| Indonesian Film Festival | 14 November 2023 | Best Original Score | Ricky Lionardi | Nominated | |
| Indonesian Film Festival | 14 November 2023 | Best Costume Design | Hagai Pakan | Nominated | |
| Film Pilihan Tempo | 29 January 2024 | Best Supporting Actor | Iswadi Pratama | Nominated | |
