= Mecca I'm Coming =

- Theatrical release poster
- Indonesian: Mekah I'm Coming
- Directed by: Jeihan Angga
- Written by: Jeihan Angga
- Produced by: Hanung Bramantyo
- Starring: Rizky Nazar; Michelle Ziudith
- Cinematography: Robby Herbi
- Edited by: Ahyat Andrianto
- Music by: Krisna Purna
- Production companies: MD Pictures; Dapur Film
- Release dates: 21 November 2019 (Jogja); 5 March 2020 (Indonesia)
- Running time: 93 minutes
- Country: Indonesia
- Languages: Indonesian; Javanese
- Box office: Rp 3.2 billion ($229,704)

Mecca I'm Coming (Indonesian: Mekah I'm Coming) is a 2019 Indonesian satirical romantic comedy film, written and directed by Jeihan Angga in his feature-length directorial debut. The film stars Rizky Nazar and Michelle Ziudith, as Eddy and Eni, respectively, whose relationship is at risk after Eni is forced to marry Pietoyo (Dwi Sasono), a wicked rich businessman, by her father.

The film had its world premiere at the 14th Jogja-NETPAC Asian Film Festival. At the 9th Maya Awards, it won five awards for Best Feature Film, Best Directorial Debut Film, Best Actor in a Supporting Role (Rasiti), Best Actress in a Supporting Role (Irawan), and Best Adapted Screenplay, out of twelve nominations. The film marks the final film appearance of Ria Irawan, who died in January 2020.

== Premise ==
A failed mechanic, Eddy, embarks on Hajj pilgrimage to prove himself to his girlfriend, Eni, and her father, before she is forced to marry Pietoyo, a wicked rich businessman.

== Cast ==
- Rizky Nazar as Eddy
- Michelle Ziudith as Eni
- Totos Rasiti as Mr. Soleh
- Ephy Sekuriti as Fajrul
- Ria Irawan as Mrs. Ramah
- Dwi Sasono as Pietoyo
- Rasyid Karim as Mr. Rojak
- Jennifer Coppen as Tuti Tutanti
- Fanny Fadillah as Mr. Somad
- Cici Tegal as merchant owner
- Yusril Fahriza as Pardijon
- Ananta Rispo as hotel receptionist
- Yati Pesek as Pietoyo's mother

== Release ==
Mecca I'm Coming had its world premiere at the 14th Jogja-NETPAC Asian Film Festival. The film was theatrically released on 5 March 2020. It garnered 82,170 moviegoers during its run and grossed Rp 3.2 billion ($229,704).

== Accolades ==
| Award | Date | Category | Recipient | Result | Ref. |
|---|---|---|---|---|---|
| Bandung Film Festival | 14 November 2020 | Best Director | Jeihan Angga | Nominated | |
| Bandung Film Festival | 14 November 2020 | Best Actor | Rizky Nazar | Nominated | |
| Bandung Film Festival | 14 November 2020 | Best Supporting Actress | Ria Irawan | Nominated | |
| Bandung Film Festival | 14 November 2020 | Best Editing | Ahyat Andrianto | Nominated | |
| Citra Awards | 5 December 2020 | Best Supporting Actor | Totos Rasiti | Nominated | |
| Citra Awards | 5 December 2020 | Best Supporting Actress | Ria Irawan | Nominated | |
| Citra Awards | 5 December 2020 | Best Film Editing | Ahyat Andrianto | Nominated | |
| Film Pilihan Tempo | 21 December 2020 | Film Pilihan Tempo | Mecca I'm Coming | Won | |
| Film Pilihan Tempo | 21 December 2020 | Best Director | Jeihan Angga | Won | |
| Film Pilihan Tempo | 21 December 2020 | Best Actor | Rizky Nazar | Nominated | |
| Film Pilihan Tempo | 21 December 2020 | Best Actress | Michelle Ziudith | Nominated | |
| Film Pilihan Tempo | 21 December 2020 | Best Supporting Actor | Totos Rasiti | Nominated | |
| Film Pilihan Tempo | 21 December 2020 | Best Supporting Actress | Ria Irawan | Nominated | |
| Film Pilihan Tempo | 21 December 2020 | Best Screenplay | Jeihan Angga | Won | |
| Maya Awards | 6-7 March 2021 | Best Feature Film | Hanung Bramantyo | Won | |
| Maya Awards | 6-7 March 2021 | Best Directorial Debut | Jeihan Angga | Won | |
| Maya Awards | 6-7 March 2021 | Best Actor in a Leading Role | Rizky Nazar | Nominated | |
| Maya Awards | 6-7 March 2021 | Best Actress in a Leading Role | Michelle Ziudith | Nominated | |
| Maya Awards | 6-7 March 2021 | Best Actor in a Supporting Role | Totos Rasiti | Won | |
| Maya Awards | 6-7 March 2021 | Best Actress in a Supporting Role | Ria Irawan | Won | |
| Maya Awards | 6-7 March 2021 | Best Brief Performance | Siti Fauziah | Nominated | |
| Maya Awards | 6-7 March 2021 | Best Brief Performance | Dwi Sasono | Nominated | |
| Maya Awards | 6-7 March 2021 | Best Adapted Screenplay | Jeihan Angga | Won | |
| Maya Awards | 6-7 March 2021 | Best Editing | Ahyat Andrianto | Nominated | |
| Maya Awards | 6-7 March 2021 | Best Poster Design | Apri Kusbiantoro | Nominated | |
| Maya Awards | 6-7 March 2021 | Best Production Design | Deki Yudhanto | Nominated | |
