= Aurora (2018 Kyrgyz film) =

2018 film

- Film poster
- Directed by: Bekzat Pirmatov
- Starring: Kanatbek Abdyrakhmanov
- Release date: 6 October 2018 (Busan IFF)
- Running time: 98 minutes
- Country: Kyrgyzstan
- Languages: Kyrgyz, Russian

Aurora is a 2018 Kyrgyzstani mystery comedy-drama film directed by Bekzat Pirmatov. It was selected as the Kyrgyz entry for the Best International Feature Film at the 92nd Academy Awards, but it was not nominated.

== Cast ==
- Kanatbek Abdyrakhmanov as Waiter
- Marat Amiraev as Freak
- Erika Baibosunova as Young girl
- Albina Imasheva as Queen
- Dina Jakob as Girl

== See also ==
- List of submissions to the 92nd Academy Awards for Best International Feature Film
- List of Kyrgyz submissions for the Academy Award for Best International Feature Film
