= Nicole Midori Woodford =

Singaporean film director

Nicole Midori Woodford (b. 1986) is a Singaporean film director and screenwriter who is known for her feature film Last Shadow at First Light (2023).

Her debut feature film Last Shadow at First Light premiered at the 71st San Sebastián International Film Festival. It was nominated for best screenplay and best performance by Mihaya Shirata at the 2023 Asia Pacific Screen Awards.

== Early life and education ==
Woodford's father and aunt are half-Japanese and half-Eurasian. Her late Japanese grandmother, who inspired Woodford's debut feature, had missed her train to work from her home in Kure in 1945 and thus survived the Hiroshima atomic blast.

Woodford studied film at the School of Art, Design & Media at Nanyang Technological University. She graduated in 2009 in the school's pioneer batch, and has later taught there since 2018.

== Career ==
Woodford is part of Berlinale Talents and the Asian Film Academy in 2010. She received the Young Artist Award in 2020, Singapore's highest award for young arts practitioners, aged 35 and below.

Woodford's short films have competed at international film festivals including Busan, Clermont-Ferrand and Singapore. She has also directed an episode of HBO Asia anthology series Folklore Season 2, produced by Eric Khoo in 2021.

Since 2018, Woodford has been a film lecturer at NTU.

== Filmography ==
| Year | Title | Notes | Ref |
|---|---|---|---|
| 2015 | For We Are Strangers | Short film | |
| 2017 | Permanent Resident | Short film | |
| 2018 | Waiting Room | Short film | |
| 2018 | Tenebrae | Short film | |
| 2023 | Last Shadow at First Light | Feature film | |
