= Ex-Husbands =

- Theatrical release poster
- Directed by: Noah Pritzker
- Screenplay by: Noah Pritzker
- Produced by: Noah Pritzker; Bruce Cohen; Nicolás Celis; Alexandra Byer
- Starring: Griffin Dunne; James Norton; Miles Heizer; Richard Benjamin; John Ventimiglia; Rosanna Arquette
- Cinematography: Alfonso Herrera Salcedo
- Edited by: Michael Taylor
- Music by: Robin Coudert
- Production companies: Bold Choices Productions; Pimienta Films; Rathaus Films
- Distributed by: Greenwich Entertainment
- Release dates: September 24, 2023 (Zinemaldia); February 21, 2025 (United States)
- Running time: 99 minutes
- Country: United States
- Language: English
- Box office: $348,193

Ex-Husbands is a 2023 American independent black comedy film written and directed by Noah Pritzker. It stars Griffin Dunne, James Norton, Miles Heizer, Richard Benjamin, John Ventimiglia and Rosanna Arquette.

Ex-Husbands premiered at the 71st San Sebastián International Film Festival on September 24, 2023, where it competed for the Golden Shell. It was released on February 21, 2025, by Greenwich Entertainment.

== Plot ==
New York City dentist Peter Pearce is first seen trying to convince his elderly father not to divorce his mother after 65 years of marriage. At the same time, Peter's older son Nick is having a meet-cute with his co-worker Thea.

Six years later, Peter is now divorced after 35 years of marriage, his father’s dementia has prevented him “playing the field” as originally planned and 30-something-year-old Nick is about to tie the knot with Thea.

Nick is about to do a bachelor-party getaway to Tulum, Mexico with his younger brother Mickey and some friends, when it turns out Peter is also booked to go to the same place. He’s trying to shake off depression, as he just had to sign the divorce papers from his wife Maria.

At the resort, the underachieving career waiter Nick becomes gloomy due to depression, as his pals party around him. Lowry is a party animal whom Peter dislikes, and Arroyo, despite declaring he’s straight and married, embarks on a liaison with Mickey, who has recently come out and is tentatively starting to date.

Peter meets Eileen, a wedding guest from another group, and they share an amicable, albeit safe, flirtation.

Upon returning to New York, Peter finds that his father died in his absence. After a family fight, Peter and his sons dispose of his cremated remains in the Hudson River, excepting a hand which is separately interned in a family crypt with the epitaph "Father, Grandfather, Ex-Husband".

== Cast ==
- Griffin Dunne as Peter Pearce
- Rosanna Arquette as Maria Pearce
- Richard Benjamin as Simon Pearce
- Miles Heizer as Mickey Pearce
- James Norton as Nick Pearce
- Eisa Davis as Eileen Link
- Marcia Jean Kurtz as Eunice Pearce
- John Ventimiglia as Sipple
- Lou Taylor Pucci as Aaron
- Echo Kellum as Chris
- Ian Owens as Yates
- Pedro Fontaine as Arroyo
- Simon Van Buyten as Lowry
- Nate Mann as Otto
- Zora Casebere as Hewette
- Rachel Zeiger-Haag as Thea
- Natalie Gold as Heather

== Production ==
It was announced in July 2022 that Noah Pritzker was writing and directing the film, with the cast including Griffin Dunne, Rosanna Arquette, Richard Benjamin, Miles Heizer and James Norton. Filming took place between New York City and Tulum. Natalie Gold was announced as part of the cast in May 2023.

== Release ==
The film had its world premiere at the 71st San Sebastián International Film Festival on September 24, 2023. It also screened at the Hamptons International Film Festival on October 7, 2023.

In November 2024, it was announced that Greenwich Entertainment had acquired North American distribution rights to the film, with an early 2025 release planned. It was released on February 21, 2025. It earned $11,000 from one theater in its opening weekend.
