= Lillah Halla =

Brazilian film director

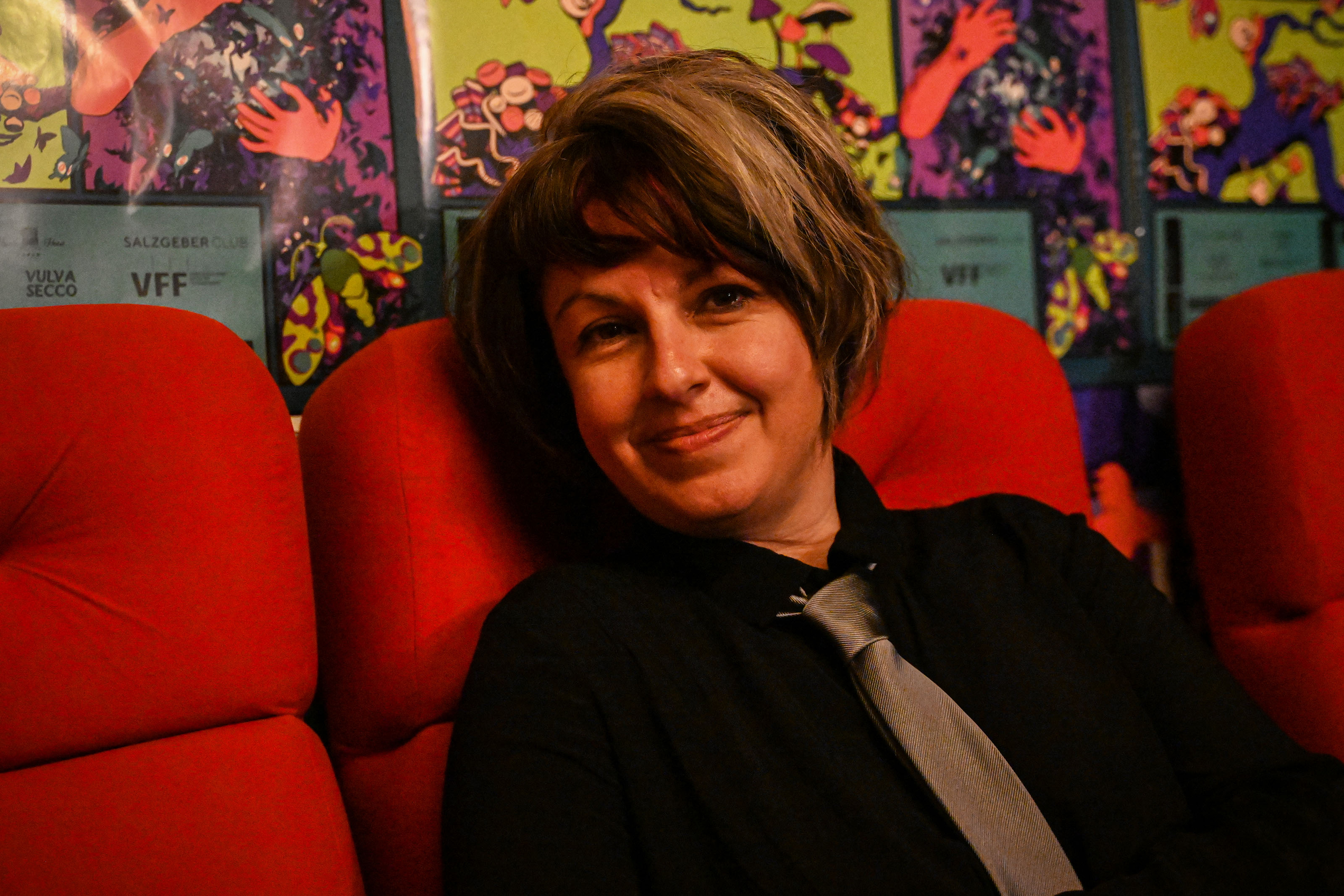
- Born: 6 April 1981 (age 44); São Paulo, Brazil
- Occupation: Director
- Years active: 2014–present
- Website: www.lillahalla.com

Lillah Halla (born 6 April 1981) is a Brazilian film director.

== Life ==
Halla was born in Vargem Grande do Sul. From 2010 until 2014, she studied film direction and scriptwriting at the Escuela Internacional de Cine y Televisión in Cuba. Her 2014 student film Si no se puede bailar, esta no es mi Revolución won the award for best short film at the Montréal World Film Festival. Afterwards, she did a research program in experimental cinema at Concordia University in Montreal in 2014.

She has worked as a live video director and cutter for theater productions in Germany. She has worked with Christoph Schlingensief, Frank Castorf and Stefan Kaegi.

Her short film Menarca (2020) was one of 10 selected short films at the Critics' Week of the 2020 Cannes Film Festival. The film tackles patriarchal myths about Vagina dentata, Amazon river dolphins and Piranhas. She won awards for the film at Kurzfilmtage Winterthur, Tirana International Film Festival and Curta Cinema as well as the audience award of Recontres de Toulouse.

Her first feature film Power Alley premiered at the 2023 Cannes Film Festival and won the FIPRESCI Prize for first features. She was awarded best director for a Brazilian film at the 2023 Rio de Janeiro International Film Festival. Her second feature film Flehmen, named after the flehmen response, is currently under development.

She is a co-founder of the São Paulo-based queer and feminist film collective Vermelha.

== Filmography ==
- 2014: Pincers (Tenazas)
- 2014: Si no se puede bailar, esta no es mi Revolución
- 2018: Lowland
- 2020: Menarca
- 2023: Power Alley (Levante)
