= Mariposa (2020 film) =

- Directed by: Fajar Bustomi
- Screenplay by: Alim Sudio
- Based on: Mariposa by Luluk HF
- Produced by: Frederica; Chand Parwez Servia
- Starring: Angga Yunanda; Adhisty Zara; Dannia Salsabilla; Abun Sungkar; Junior Roberts; Syakir Daulay; Irgi Fahrezi; Ariyo Wahab; Ersa Mayori; Ibrahim Imran; Iszur Muchtar
- Cinematography: Dimas Imam Subhono
- Edited by: Ryan Purwoko
- Music by: Andhika Triyadi
- Production companies: Falcon Pictures; Kharisma Starvision Plus
- Release date: March 12, 2020
- Running time: 118 menit
- Country: Indonesia
- Language: Bahasa Indonesia

Mariposa is an Indonesian teen drama comedy romance film directed by Fajar Bustomi, based on the 2018 novel of the same name by Luluk HF. The film stars Angga Yunanda, Adhisty Zara, Dannia Salsabilla, Abun Sungkar, and Junior Roberts and follows the life of new student Acha, who falls for Iqbal, an overachieving student who is torn between love and family pressure.

It was released on March 12, 2020, to positive reviews from critics and debuted with 140.000 audiences on its first day. Theaters are closed on March 23 theaters, following the COVID-19 outbreak in Indonesia, forcing Mariposa to stop its screening. On December 31, Mariposa was re-released and gained a total of 700.000 audiences.

== Cast ==
- Angga Yunanda as Iqbal Guanna Freedy
- Adhisty Zara as Natasha "Acha" Kay Loovy
- Dannia Salsabila as Amanda
- Abun Sungkar as Rian
- Junior Roberts as Glen
- Syakir Daulay as Juna
- Irgi Fahrezi as Henry Kusuma
- Ariyo Wahab as Iqbaal's father
- Ersa Mayori as Kirana
- Baim sebagai Teddy
- Iszur Muchtar as Bambang

== Release ==
Mariposa was released on March 12, 2020, alongside Buku Harianku and Tenripada. SCTV acquired the film's broadcasting rights, premiering it on August 23, 2021.

== Spin-off and sequel ==
In 2021, a spin-off film titled 12 Cerita Glen Anggara, also adapted from a novel of the same name by Luluk HF, focusing on Junior Robert's character Glen was announced with Junior himself, Angga Yunanda, Adhisty Zara, Dannia Salsabila, and Abun Sungkar reprising their roles. In addition, Prilly Latuconsina will portray Shena as the film's leading actress.
