= You and I (2020 film) =

2020 documentary film

- Poster
- Directed by: Fanny Chotimah
- Based on: Pemenang Kehidupan by Adrian Mulya and Lilik HS
- Produced by: Yulia Evina Bhara; Amerta Kusuma; Tazia Teresa Darryanto
- Cinematography: Ika Wulandari; Agustian Tri Yuanto
- Edited by: Angen Sodo Pangaribowo
- Production companies: KawanKawan Media; Super 8mm; Partisipasi Indonesia
- Release date: 18 September 2020 (DMZ)
- Running time: 72 minutes
- Country: Indonesia
- Language: Javanese

You and I is a 2020 documentary film directed by Fanny Chotimah in her feature directorial debut, based on the photo book Pemenang Kehidupan by Adrian Mulya and Lilik HS. The film had its world premiere at the 12th DMZ International Documentary Film Festival on 18 September 2020. It won the Best Documentary Feature at the 2020 Indonesian Film Festival.

== Premise ==
Kaminah and Kusdalini met while in prison as political prisoners for participating in a youth choir during the Indonesian mass killings of 1965–66. After being released from prison, they lived together, having been ostracized by those closest to them due to the stigma of communism.

== Production ==
In 2015, photographer Adrian Mulya and writer Lilik HS released the photo book titled Pemenang Kehidupan (English: The Winners of Life), featuring the women political prisoners during the Indonesian mass killings of 1965–66, including Kaminah and Kusdalini. Yulia Evina Bhara, who also produced the book, offered director Fanny Chotimah to adapt the story into a documentary film. The research and production began in 2016. The project participated in Festival Film Dokumenter Masterclass in 2016, Docs By the Sea and DMZ Docs Fund in 2017.

== Release ==
You and I had its world premiere at the 12th DMZ International Documentary Film Festival on 18 September 2020, where it won the Asian Perspective competition. It served as the closing film of 15th Jogja-NETPAC Asian Film Festival on 29 November 2020. It had its European premiere at the 2021 CPH:DOX, winning the Next:Wave Award.

Video on demand service Bioskop Online acquired the film's distribution, releasing it on 9 April 2021.

== Accolades ==
Award / Film Festival	Date of ceremony	Category	Recipient(s)	Result	Ref.
DMZ International Documentary Film Festival	24 September 2020	Asian Perspective Award	Fanny Chotimah	Won	
Indonesian Film Festival	5 December 2020	Best Documentary Feature	Fanny Chotimah	Won	
Maya Awards	6–7 March 2021	Best Documentary Feature Film	Fanny Chotimah	Won	
Maya Awards	6–7 March 2021	Iqbal Rais Award for Best Directorial Debut Feature	Fanny Chotimah	Nominated	
CPH:DOX	30 April 2021	Next:Wave Award	Fanny Chotimah	Won	
