= Noah Pritzker =

American film director and screenwriter

Noah Pritzker (born December 1986) is an American film director and screenwriter, and a member of the Pritzker family.

== Biography ==
Pritzker grew up San Francisco's Pacific Heights neighborhood. He is the son of billionaire John Pritzker and philanthropist Lisa Stone Pritzker. Pritzker attended San Francisco Day School and graduated from San Francisco University High School in 2005. He then studied art history and literature at Columbia University.

Pritzker's first film, Quitters, was released in 2015. He cowrote it with Ben Tarnoff. The film was a 2015 nominee at the SXSW Grand Jury Award for Narrative Feature.

Pritzker wrote and directed the film Ex-Husbands, which was released in 2023. He has said that the film was based in part on his experiences watching the dissolution of his own parents' marriage after 35 years.

Pritzker lives in Manhattan's West Village neighborhood.
