= Yosep Anggi Noen =

Indonesian filmmaker

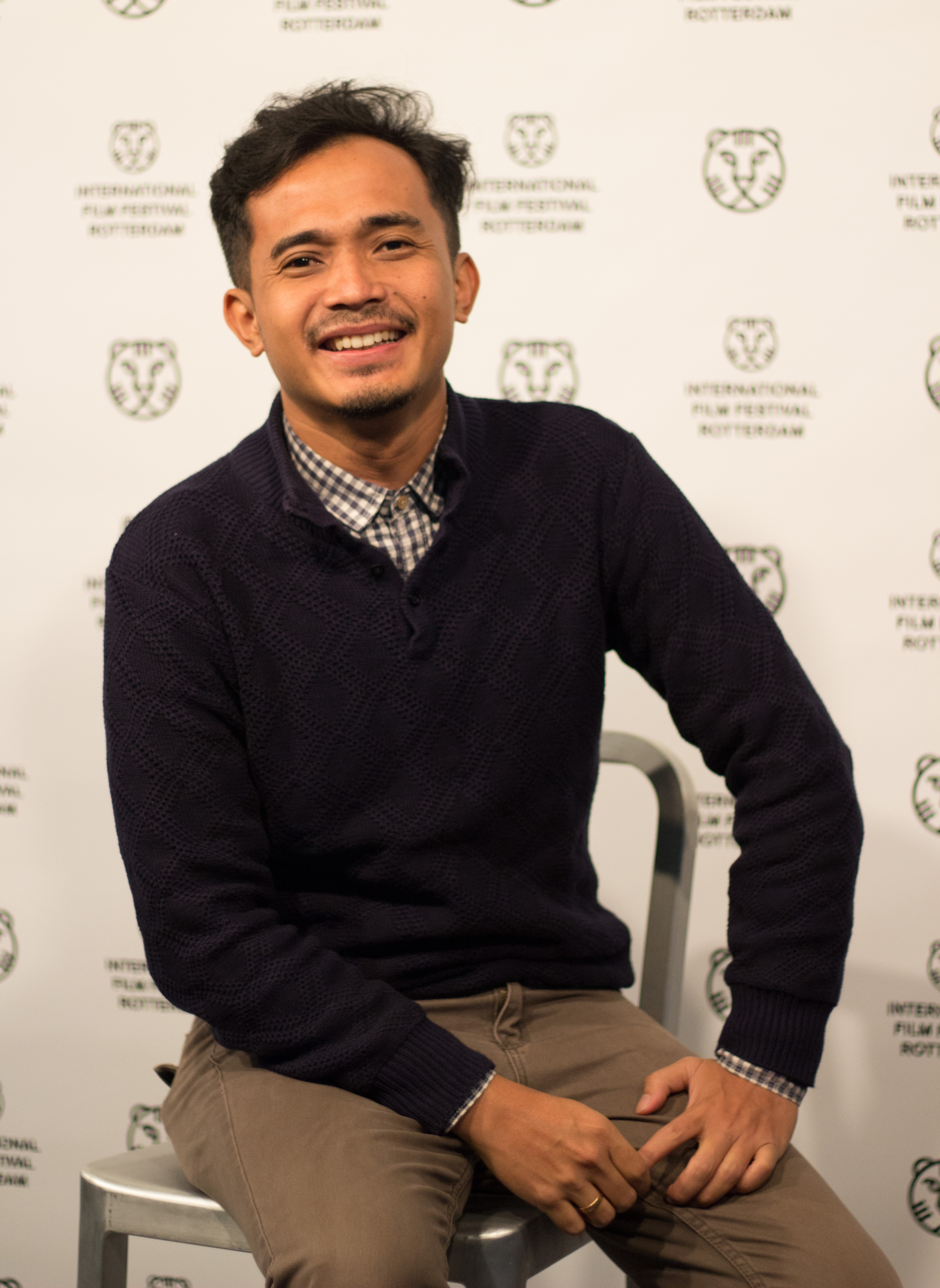
- Noen in 2020
- Born: March 15, 1983 (age 43); Sleman, Yogyakarta
- Citizenship: Indonesia
- Education: Universitas Gadjah Mada
- Occupations: Director; producer; writer; editor; actor
- Years active: 2005–present

Yosep Anggi Noen (born 15 March 1983) is an Indonesian film director, producer, screenwriter, Film editor, and actor. With his 2019 film The Science of Fictions, Noen won the Maya Award for Best Director and earned a Citra Award for Best Director nomination.

== Early life ==
Noen's interest in filmmaking dated back from when he was in high school as he made his first film with a handheld camera. He then joined the local film collective Limaenam Films in Yogyakarta and was actively involved in the Jogja-NETPAC Asian Film Festival.

== Career ==
After years of working in the industry, Noen released his feature film directorial debut Peculiar Vacation and Other Illnesses in 2012. A road film set in a remote village and mountainous areas, the film was funded by the Swiss Agency for Development and Cooperation and the Hubert Bals Fund. His next feature release, the 2016 biopic of disappeared poet and activist Widji Thukul titled Solo, Solitude, earned Noen critical praise, with The Jakarta Post calling the film "made by people who know what they are trying to say and the message they want to convey." Noen received two Citra Award nominations for Best Director and Best Original Screenplay for his works on the film.

In 2019, Noen directed, wrote, produced, and edited The Science of Fictions. The film saw him reunite with veteran stage actor Gunawan Maryanto who played Widji Thukul in Solo, Solitude. The film garnered Noen four nominations at the 40th Citra Awards for Best Picture, Best Director, Best Original Screenplay, and Best Editing. He lost in the Original Screenplay category to Adriyanto Dewo's Homecoming and the remaining three to Joko Anwar's Impetigore.

His upcoming project, 24 Hours with Gaspar, is an adaptation of Sabda Armandio's novel of the same name starring Citra Award winners Reza Rahadian, Laura Basuki, and Dewi Irawan.

== Filmography ==
| Year | Film | Director | Screenwriter | Producer | Editing | Notes |
|---|---|---|---|---|---|---|
| 2011 | Working Girls | Yes | No | No | No | Segment: 'Windless Rhapsody' |
| 2012 | Peculiar Vacation and Other Illnesses | Yes | Yes | No | No | |
| 2016 | Solo, Solitude | Yes | Yes | Yes | No | |
| 2019 | The Science of Fictions | Yes | Yes | Yes | Yes | |
| 2023 | 24 Hours with Gaspar | Yes | No | No | No | |
| 2024 | The Redemption of Sin | Yes | Yes | No | No | |
| 2026 | The Sea Speaks His Name | Yes | Yes | No | No | |

=== Short films ===
| Year | Film | director | screenWriter | Producer | Film Editor | Actor | Notes |
|---|---|---|---|---|---|---|---|
| 2002 | Met Father | Yes | No | No | No | No | |
| 2005 | The Waiting | Yes | No | No | No | No | |
| 2006 | About Flying | Yes | No | No | No | No | |
| 2009 | It's Not Raining Outside | Yes | Yes | Yes | No | No | |
| 2011 | Bermula dari A | No | No | Yes | No | No | Directed by B. W. Purwa Negara |
| 2013 | A Lady Caddy Who Never Saw a Hole in One | Yes | Yes | No | Yes | No | |
| 2014 | Genre Sub Genre | Yes | Yes | No | No | No | |
| 2015 | Love Story Not | Yes | No | No | No | Yes | |
| 2015 | Ruma | Yes | Yes | No | Yes | No | |
| 2018 | Ballad of Blood and Two White Buckets | Yes | Yes | No | No | No | |

== Awards and nominations ==
| Year | Award | Category | Work | Result |
|---|---|---|---|---|
| 2013 | Busan International Film Festival | Sonje Award | A Lady Caddy Who Never Saw a Hole in One | Won |
| 2016 | 36th Citra Awards | Best Director | Solo, Solitude | Nominated |
| 2016 | 36th Citra Awards | Best Original Screenplay | Solo, Solitude | Nominated |
| 2016 | 10th Jogja-NETPAC Asian Film Festival | Golden Hanoman Award | Solo, Solitude | Won |
| 2017 | 2nd Usmar Ismail Awards | Best Director | Solo, Solitude | Won |
| 2019 | Locarno Film Festival | Golden Leopard | The Science of Fictions | Nominated |
| 2019 | Locarno Film Festival | Special Mentions | The Science of Fictions | Won |
| 2019 | 14th Jogja-NETPAC Asian Film Festival | Silver Hanoman Award | The Science of Fictions | Won |
| 2019 | 3rd Tempo Film Festival | Best Film | The Science of Fictions | Won |
| 2019 | 3rd Tempo Film Festival | Best Director | The Science of Fictions | Won |
| 2019 | 3rd Tempo Film Festival | Best Screenplay | The Science of Fictions | Nominated |
| 2020 | 40th Citra Awards | Best Picture | The Science of Fictions | Nominated |
| 2020 | 40th Citra Awards | Best Director | The Science of Fictions | Nominated |
| 2020 | 40th Citra Awards | Best Original Screenplay | The Science of Fictions | Nominated |
| 2020 | 40th Citra Awards | Best Editing | The Science of Fictions | Nominated |
| 2021 | 9th Maya Awards | Best Original Screenplay | The Science of Fictions | Nominated |
| 2021 | 9th Maya Awards | Best Feature Film | The Science of Fictions | Nominated |
| 2021 | 9th Maya Awards | Best Director | The Science of Fictions | Won |
