= Power Alley =

2023 Brazilian film

- Theatrical release poster
- Portuguese: Levante
- Directed by: Lillah Halla
- Written by: Lillah Halla; María Elena Morán
- Produced by: Clarissa Guarilha; Rafaella Costa; Louise Bellicaud; Claire Charles-Gervais
- Starring: Ayomi Domenica Dias
- Cinematography: Wilssa Esser
- Edited by: Eva Randolph
- Music by: Maria Beraldo
- Production companies: Arissas; Manjericão Filmes; In Vivo Films; Cimarrón Cine
- Release date: 23 September 2023 (Cannes)
- Running time: 99 minutes
- Countries: Brazil; France; Uruguay
- Language: Portuguese

Power Alley (Portuguese: Levante) is a 2023 drama film co-written and directed by Lillah Halla. The film centres on Sofia (Ayomi Domenica Dias), a 17-year-old volleyball player in Brazil who is on the verge of being offered an athletic scholarship, when she unexpectedly finds herself pregnant and must struggle to find a way to get an abortion in light of the political and legal situation in the country.

The film also addresses secondary themes about the status of LGBTQ communities in Brazil; Sofia herself is dating one of her teammates, and her volleyball team includes LGBTQ teammates whose own struggles for equality are depicted alongside Sofia's struggle for reproductive choice.

Its supporting cast includes Loro Bardot, Grace Passô, Gláucia Vandeveld, Rômulo Braga and Larissa Siqueira.

== Production ==
Halla's feature debut, the film was made as an international coproduction of companies from Brazil, France and Uruguay after its initial funding was rescinded in a wave of politically-motivated arts cutbacks by the government of Jair Bolsonaro.

== Distribution ==
Ahead of its premiere, the film secured a sales deal with M-Appeal, which announced numerous international distribution deals later in the year.

The film premiered in the Critics' Week program at the 2023 Cannes Film Festival, where it was the winner of the FIPRESCI Prize for Parallel Sections and was in contention for the Queer Palm.

At the 2023 Festival du nouveau cinéma in Canada, it was the winner of the inaugural Prix Fierté Montréal for best LGBTQ-themed film in the festival lineup.

== Reception ==
=== Awards and nominations ===
Awards and nominations for Power Alley
Award	Date of ceremony	Category	Recipient(s)	Result	Ref.
Cannes Film Festival	24 May 2023	Critics' Week Grand Prix	Lillah Halla	Nominated	
Cannes Film Festival	26 May 2023	Queer Palm	Lillah Halla	Nominated	
Cannes Film Festival	27 May 2023	Caméra d'Or	Lillah Halla	Nominated	
Cannes Film Festival	27 May 2023	FIPRESCI Prize for Parallel Sections	Lillah Halla	Won	
Festival du nouveau cinéma	15 October 2023	Prix Fierté Montréal	Lillah Halla and Maria Elena Morán	Won	
Bergamo Film Meeting	March 18, 2024	Grand Prix	Lillah Halla	Won	
