= Last Shadow at First Light =

2023 film by Nicole Midori Woodford

- Promotional poster
- Directed by: Nicole Midori Woodford
- Screenplay by: Nicole Midori Woodford
- Produced by: Jeremy Chua; Shozo Ichiyama; Bostjan Virc; Liza Diño-Seguerra; Yulia Evina Bhara
- Starring: Masatoshi Nagase; Mihaya Shirata; Mariko Tsutsui; Peter Yu
- Cinematography: Hideho Urata
- Edited by: Daniel Hui; Nicole Midori Woodford
- Music by: Alenja Pivko Kneževič
- Production companies: Pōtocol; Fourier Films; Studio Virc; Cogito Works
- Release dates: 24 September 2023 (San Sebastián); November 2023 (Tokyo Filmex); December 2023 (SGIFF)
- Running time: 110 minutes
- Countries: Singapore; Japan; Slovenia; Philippines; Indonesia
- Languages: Japanese; Mandarin; English

Last Shadow at First Light is a 2023 internationally co-produced supernatural drama film written and directed by Singaporean director Nicole Midori Woodford in her feature-length debut. It premiered at the 71st San Sebastián International Film Festival in September 2023, where it was in competition for the Kutxabank-New Directors Award.

== Cast ==
- Masatoshi Nagase as Ami's uncle
- Mihaya Shirata as Ami
- Mariko Tsutsui as Ami's mother
- Peter Yu as Ami's father
- Yong Ser Pin as Ami's grandfather

== Production ==
The film won the SEAFIC Lab's SEA Open Fund and TorinoFilmLab Feature Lab's TFL Coproduction Award. It was also developed at the Singapore International Film Festival's SEA Lab and Talents Tokyo. It received support from the Singapore Film Commission, Slovenian Film Centre, Purin Pictures and Talents Tokyo Next Masters Support Program, among others.

Most of the filming took place in and around Rikuzentakata in Japan, a city which was largely devastated by the 2011 Tōhoku earthquake and tsunami. The film was also shot in Singapore.
