= Gunawan Maryanto =

Indonesian author and theatre director (1976–2021)

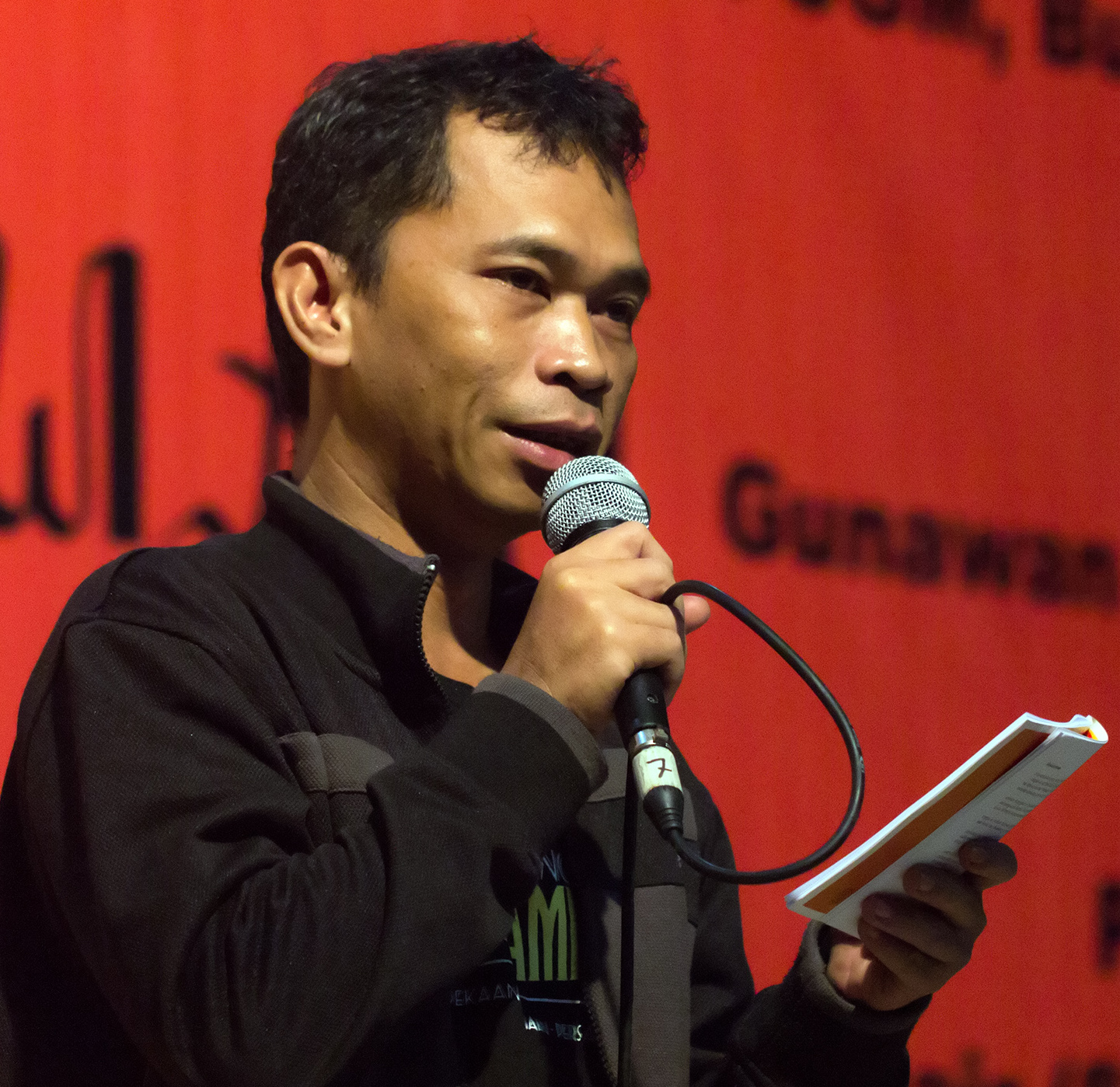
Gunawan Maryanto reading his poetry in 2014

Gunawan Maryanto (10 April 1976 – 6 October 2021) was an Indonesian author and theatre director. He was born in Yogyakarta. Aside from managing Teater Garasi, he also organised the yearly Indonesian Dramatic Reading Festival with Joned Suryatmoko. His poetry, prose, and literary criticism have been featured in a variety of Indonesian mass media. He contributed towards the selection of plays for the 2019 New Indonesian Plays collection.

Maryanto staged his works in several countries, received arts grants from the Manage Institute, and won a number of competitions. In 2017, Maryanto won the Best Lead Actor award at the Umar Ismail Awards for his performance as poet Widji Thukul in the film, Istirahatlah Kata-kata.

Maryanto died at the age of 45 on October 6, 2021, at a hospital in Yogyakarta due to cardiac arrest.
