= Widji Thukul =

Indonesian poet and activist (born 1963)

- Born: Wiji Widodo; 26 August 1963; Surakarta, Central Java, Indonesia
- Disappeared: 10 February 1998 (aged 34)
- Status: Missing for 28 years, 3 months and 6 days
- Political party: PRD

Widji Thukul (born 26 August 1963) is an Indonesian poet and activist. His work is political, often critical of the Indonesian government and the social conditions of the country. He has been missing since 1998.

== Life ==
Born on 26 August 1963, Thukul attended junior high school, but left middle school in 1982 due to his family's financial constraints. Early jobs included newspaper-seller, ticket-scalper, and finisher in a furniture shop.

As well as being a poet, Thukul was also a musician and also accompanied a theatre group, Theater Jagat, around Solo.

One of his poems, "Sajak Ibu" was set to music by the world famous composer and pianist Ananda Sukarlan who is Indonesia's leading figure in art song.

In 1988, Thukul married Dyah Sujirah. They had two children and together they founded an arts group called Sanggar Suka Banjir (Frequent Flooding Studio).

Thukul helped organize workers demonstrations and was a member of Partai Rakyat Demokratik (People's Democratic Party). In a worker demonstration in 1995, Thukul was struck in the eye by a rifle butt, causing permanent damage to his sight.

His last contact with his wife was in February 1998. In April of that year he was seen in a demonstration in Tangerang but has not been seen since. It is suspected that he was one of many anti-government protesters abducted by government forces during the anti-Suharto demonstrations. In 2014, politician Andi Arief stated that Thukul is still alive and was kidnapped by Prabowo Subianto and his military troupe. His wife Dyah has since died in 2023.

== Publications ==
- Puisi Pelo (Lisping Poetry), published by Taman Budaya Surakata, Solo, 1984.
- Darman dan Lain-lain (Darman and the Others), published by Taman Budaya Surakata, Solo, 1994.
- Mencari Tanah Lapang (Looking for an Open Plot of Land), published by Manus Amici, 1994.
- Aku Ingin Jadi Peluru (I Want to be a Bullet), published by IndonesiaTera, Magelang, 2000.

== Awards ==
Thukul's Looking for an Open Plot of Land won the 'Encourage Award' from the Netherlands-based Wertheim Foundation.

== See also ==
- List of people who disappeared mysteriously (2000–present)

== Notes ==
Some of this information in this article is taken from the biographical essay 'Wiji Thukul: People's Poet' by Tinuk R. Yampolsky, in Menagerie 5, edited by John McGlynn and Laora Arkeman, Lontar Foundation, Jakarta, 2003.
