= 17th Jogja-NETPAC Asian Film Festival =

2022 film festival

- Opening film: Piknik Pesona
- Closing film: Plan 75
- Location: Yogyakarta, Indonesia
- Founded: 2006
- Awards: Golden Hanoman: Autobiography
- Festival date: 26 November – 3 December 2022
- Website: Official website

Jogja-NETPAC Asian Film Festival
- 18th 16th

The 17th annual Jogja-NETPAC Asian Film Festival was held from 26 November to 3 December 2022. Indonesian anthology film Piknik Pesona was selected to open the festival. Japanese drama film Plan 75 was the closing film of the festival.

The most prestigious award of the festival, Golden Hanoman Award, was presented to Indonesian thriller film Autobiography, directed by Makbul Mubarak.

== Juries ==
The following juries were named for the festival.

=== Main competition ===
- Gertjan Zuilhof, Dutch film festival programmer
- Silvia Wong, journalist
- Timo Tjahjanto, Indonesian filmmaker

=== NETPAC Award ===
- Djenar Maesa Ayu, Indonesian actress
- Wong Tuck Cheong, owner and operator of Kelab Seni Filem Malaysia
- Koyo Yamashita, Japanese festival director

=== Blencong Award ===
- Rachel Amanda Aurora, Indonesian actress
- Teddy Soeriaatmadja, Indonesian film director
- Ho Yuhang, Malaysian film director

=== Indonesian Screen Awards ===
- Sandeep Ray, writer, visual artist and historian
- Mat Kesting, film curator (CEO and director of the Adelaide Film Festival since 2019)
- Elvert Bañares, film director

=== Geber Awards ===
- Angger Nugroho, film producer
- Sugar Nadia Azier, film program manager
- Andhika Prayogo, film critic and content creator

=== Student Awards ===
- I Gede Agung Yohana Dharma
- Muhammad Fadjrin Rasendryo Abrar
- Mohammad Ziddan Fachrirobi
- Muhammad Ghifari Fadhlissalam
- Albertus Nico Wicaksono

== Official selection ==
The official selection of the festival was announced during a press conference on 18 November 2022.

=== Opening and closing films ===
English title	Original title	Director(s)	Production countrie(s)
Piknik Pesona (opening film)		Various: Gugun Arief; Wisnu Surya Pratama; Winnie Benjamin; Gianni Fajri; Ariani Darmawan; Tumpal Tampubolon; Manuel Alberto Maia; Aditya Ahmad; M. Reza Fahriyansyah; Anggun Priambodo	Indonesia
Plan 75 (closing film)		Chie Hayakawa	Japan, France, Philippines, Qatar

=== In competition ===
English title	Original title	Director(s)	Production countrie(s)
24		Royston Tan	Singapore
Arnold is a Model Student	Arnon pen nakrian tuayang	Sorayos Prapapan	Thailand, Singapore, France, Netherlands, Philippines
Autobiography		Makbul Mubarak	Indonesia
Before, Now & Then	Nana	Kamila Andini	Indonesia
The Brittle Thread	Jhini Bini Chadariya	Ritesh Sharma	India
Killing the Eunuch Khan	Koshtan-e khajeh	Abed Abest	Iran
Leonor Will Never Die		Martika Escobar Ramirez	Philippines
Let Me Hear It Barefoot	Hadashi de Narashite Misero	Riho Kudo	Japan
Like & Share		Gina S. Noer	Indonesia
Like a Fish on the Moon	Zan, Mard, Bache	Domaz Hajiha	Iran
The Newspaper	ද නිවුස් පේපර්	Sarath Kothalawala, Kumara Thirimadura	Sri Lanka
Return to Seoul	Retour à Séoul	Davy Chou	Cambodia
Silver Bird and Rainbow Fish		Lei Lei	China

=== Light of Asia ===
English title	Original title	Director(s)	Production countrie(s)
The Appointed Son of God	Ang Hirirang na Anak ng Diyos	Lester Cristal	Philippines
Blinded by the Light	Saeng Mua Bot	Chanasorn Chaikitiporn	Thailand
Dancing Colors		M. Reza Fahriyansyah	Indonesia
Falling Day	Si Wol	Kyung Seo Park	South Korea
The Intrusion	Anjing-Anjing Menyerbu Kuburan	Eden Junjung	Indonesia
It's Raining Frogs Outside	Ampangabat Nin Talakba Ha Likol	Maria Estela Paiso	Philippines
Murmurs of the Jungle	Aadigunjan	Sohil Vaidya	India
Mysterious Hill		Thamsatid Charoenrittichai	Thailand
Red Dish		Mohammad Khabour	Jordan

=== Indonesian Screen Awards ===
English title	Original title	Director(s)
The Ballads of Roy	Balada Si Roy	Fajar Nugros
Cross the Line		Razka Robby Ertanto
The Exiles	Eksil	Lola Amaria
Galang		Adriyanto Dewo
History of Untellable Tales	Sejarah Kisah-Kisah yang Musnah	BW Purbanegara
Orpa		Theo Rumansara
The Portrait of a Nightmare	Potret Mimpi Buruk	Ismail Basbeth
Sahara		Zhaddam Aldhy Nurdin
Sound from the Sea	Alang-Alang	Khusnul Khitam
Stealing Raden Saleh	Mencuri Raden Saleh	Angga Dwimas Sasongko
The Tone Wheels	Roda-Roda Nada	Yuda Kurniawan

=== Panorama ===
English title	Original title	Director(s)	Production countrie(s)
Holy Spider		Ali Abbasi	Iran
Joyland		Saim Sadiq	Pakistan
Leila's Brothers	Baradaran-e Leila	Saeed Roustayi	Iran
Love Life		Koji Fukada	Japan
My Small Land	Mai sumoru rando	Emma Kawawada	Iran
No Bears	Khers Nist	Jafar Panahi	Iran
The Novelist's Film	So-seol-ga-ui yeong-hwa	Hong Sang-soo	South Korea
Small, Slow But Steady	Keiko, me wo sumasete	Sho Miyake	Japan
When the Waves Are Gone	Kapag Wala Na Ang Mga Alon	Lav Diaz	Philippines

=== Asian Perspectives ===
English title	Original title	Director(s)	Production countrie(s)
Ajoomma	아줌마	He Shuming	Singapore, South Korea
Big Night!		Jun Lana	Philippines
Blood Flower	Harum Malam	Dain Said	Malaysia
Come Back Anytime		John Daschbach	Japan
Jiseok	지석	Kim Young-jo	South Korea
Look At Me, Touch Me, Kiss Me		Djenar Maesa Ayu, Ho Yuhang, Kim Tai Sik	Indonesia, Malaysia, South Korea
Maika: The Girl from Another Galaxy	Maika: Cô Bé Từ Hành Tinh Khắc	Ham Tran	Vietnam
The Myriad of Faces of the Future Challengers	Segudang Wajah Para Penantang Masa Depan	I Gde Mika, Yuki Aditya	Indonesia
Neighbours	Nachbam	Mano Khalil	Syria
Stone Turtle		Woo Ming Jin	Malaysia
Summer Holiday	Aam Kathaler Chhuti	Mohammad Nuruzzaman	Bangladesh
The Wheel	Khürd	Nomin Lkhagvasuren	Mongolia

== Awards ==
The following awards were presented at the festival:

- Golden Hanoman Award: Autobiography by Makbul Mubarak
- Silver Hanoman Award: Leonor Will Never Die by Martika Ramirez Escobar
- NETPAC Award: Let Me Hear It Barefoot by Riho Kudo
  - NETPAC Award – Special Mention: 24 by Royston Tan
- JAFF Indonesian Screen Awards:
  - Best Film: The Exiles by Lola Amaria
  - Best Directing: Adriyanto Dewo for Galang
  - Best Performance: Orsila Murib for Orpa and Rafli Anwar Mursadad for Sound from the Sea
  - Best Cinematography: Yudi Datau for Sound from the Sea
  - Best Editing: Yuda Kurniawan for The Tone Wheels
  - Best Storytelling: Tumpal Tampubolon for Galang
- Geber Award: Leonor Will Never Die by Martika Ramirez Escobar
- Blencong Award: The Intrusion by Eden Junjung
  - Blencong Award – Special Mention: Falling Day by Kyung Seo Park
- Jogja Students Film Award: The Intrusion by Eden Junjung
