= Citra Award for Best Supporting Actress =

Award given annually at the Indonesian Film Festival

- Country: Indonesia
- Presented by: Indonesian Film Festival
- First award: 1955
- Currently held by: Christine Hakim, On Your Lap (2025)

Highlights
- Most wins: Christine Hakim (3)
- Most nominations: Ria Irawan (6)
- Website: festivalfilm.id

The Citra Award for Best Supporting Actress (Indonesian: Piala Citra untuk Pemeran Pendukung Wanita Terbaik) is an award given at the Indonesian Film Festival (FFI) to Indonesian actresses for their achievements in a supporting role. The Citra Awards, described by Screen International as "Indonesia's equivalent to the Oscars", are the country's most prestigious film awards and are intended to recognize achievements in films as well as to draw public interest to the film industry.

Christine Hakim is the most recent winner for her performance in On Your Lap in the 2025 ceremony.

== History ==
The Citra Awards, then known as the Indonesian Film Festival Awards, were first given in 1955 to Endang Kusdiningsih (Tarmina). Succeeding festivals were held in 1960 and 1967 and annually since 1973. There were no Citra Awards given between 1993 and 2003 due to sharp decline in domestic film production. It was reinstated as an annual event in 2004 after receiving funds from the Indonesian government.

Christine Hakim is the most successful actress in this category with three wins out of five nominations. Nani Widjaja is the next most successful actress in the category with two wins out of five nominations. Rima Melati holds the distinction for having the most nominations without any wins with five, most recently in 1989 for Arini II. Combined with her record in the Best Actress category, Hakim is Indonesia's most decorated actress with nine overall Citra Awards out of fifteen nominations.

Two actresses have received multiple nominations in the same year: Shanty for Dead Time: Kala and Maaf, Saya Menghamili Istri Anda in 2007 (lost to Meriam Bellina) as well as Jajang C. Noer for 3 Nafas Likas and Cahaya Dari Timur: Beta Maluku in 2014 (lost to Tika Bravani).

The award was not presented at the 1974 ceremony. In 1984, no winner was selected although three actresses were nominated.

== Nominations and awards ==
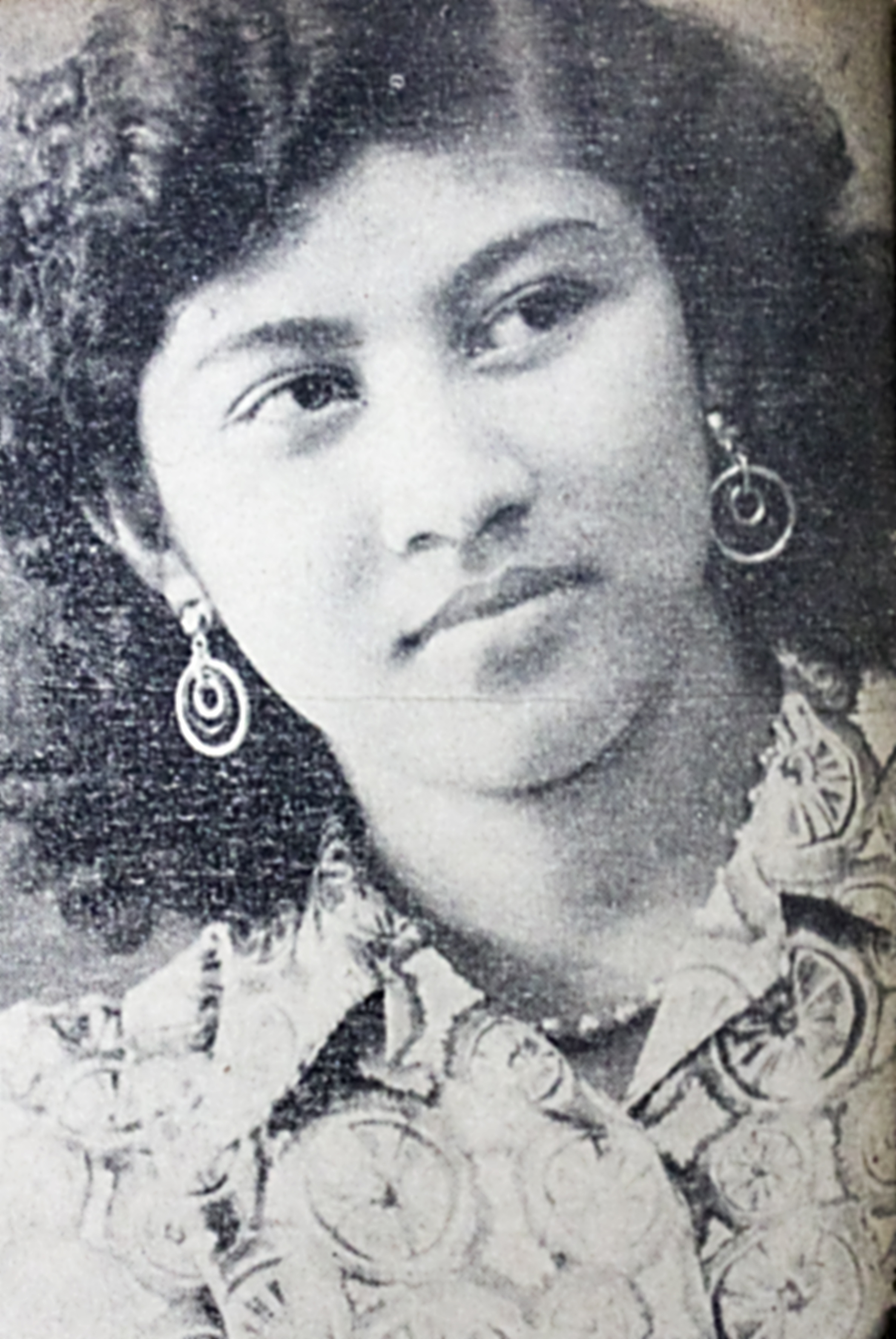
Endang Kusdiningsih won the award in 1955.

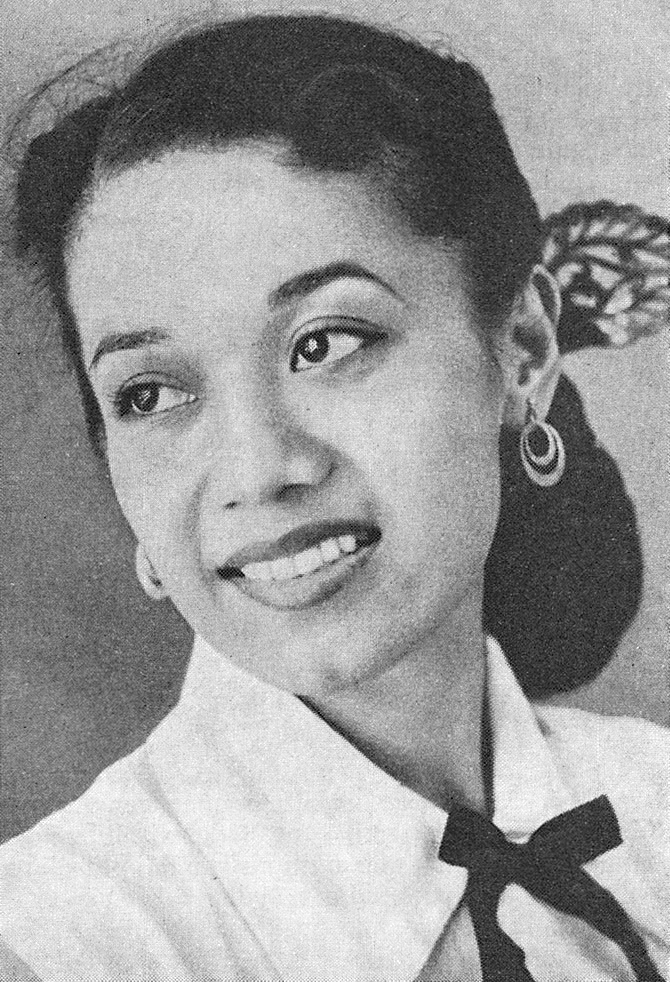
Marlia Hardi won a Citra Award in 1967

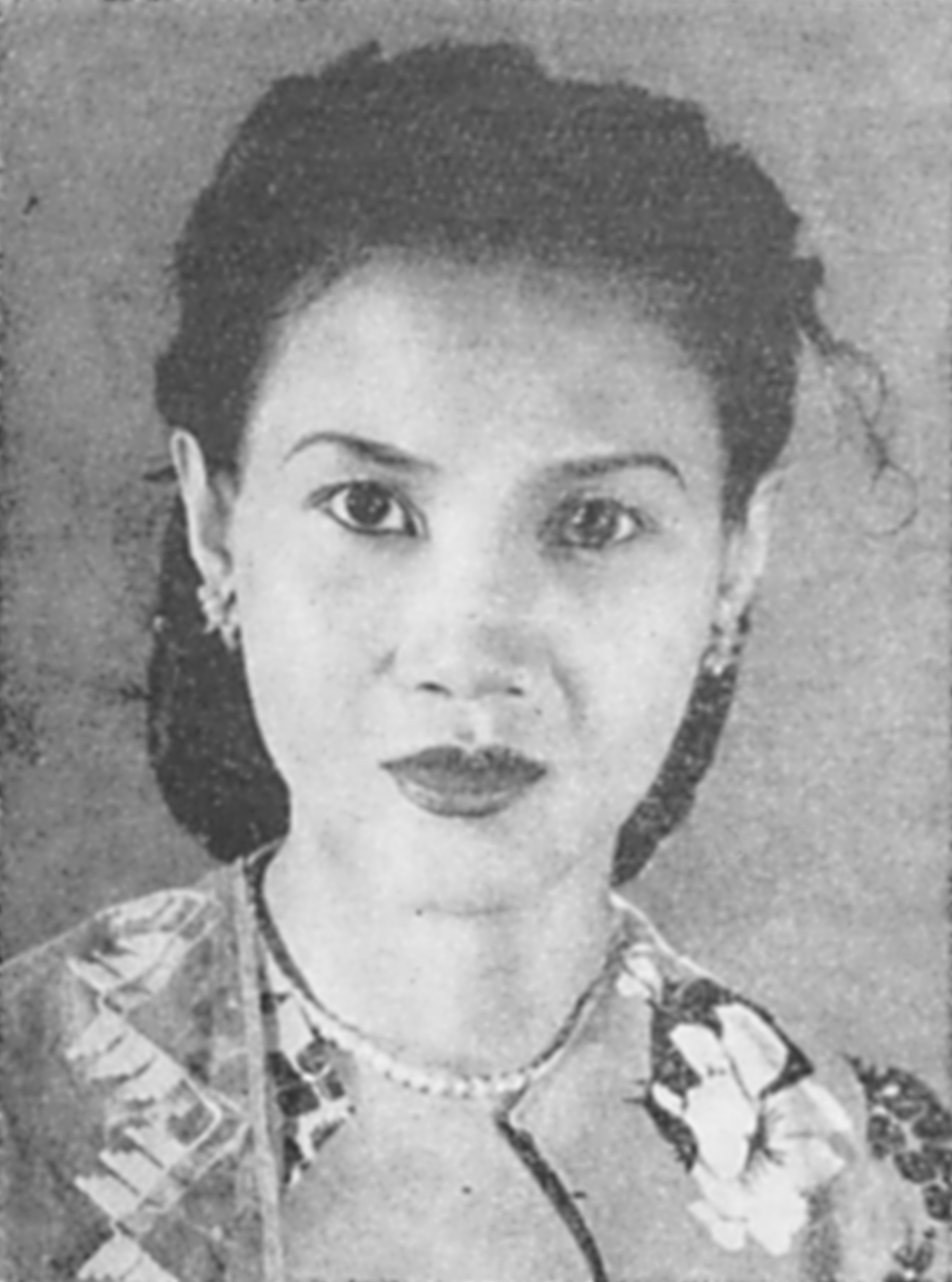
Sofia WD won the award in 1973.

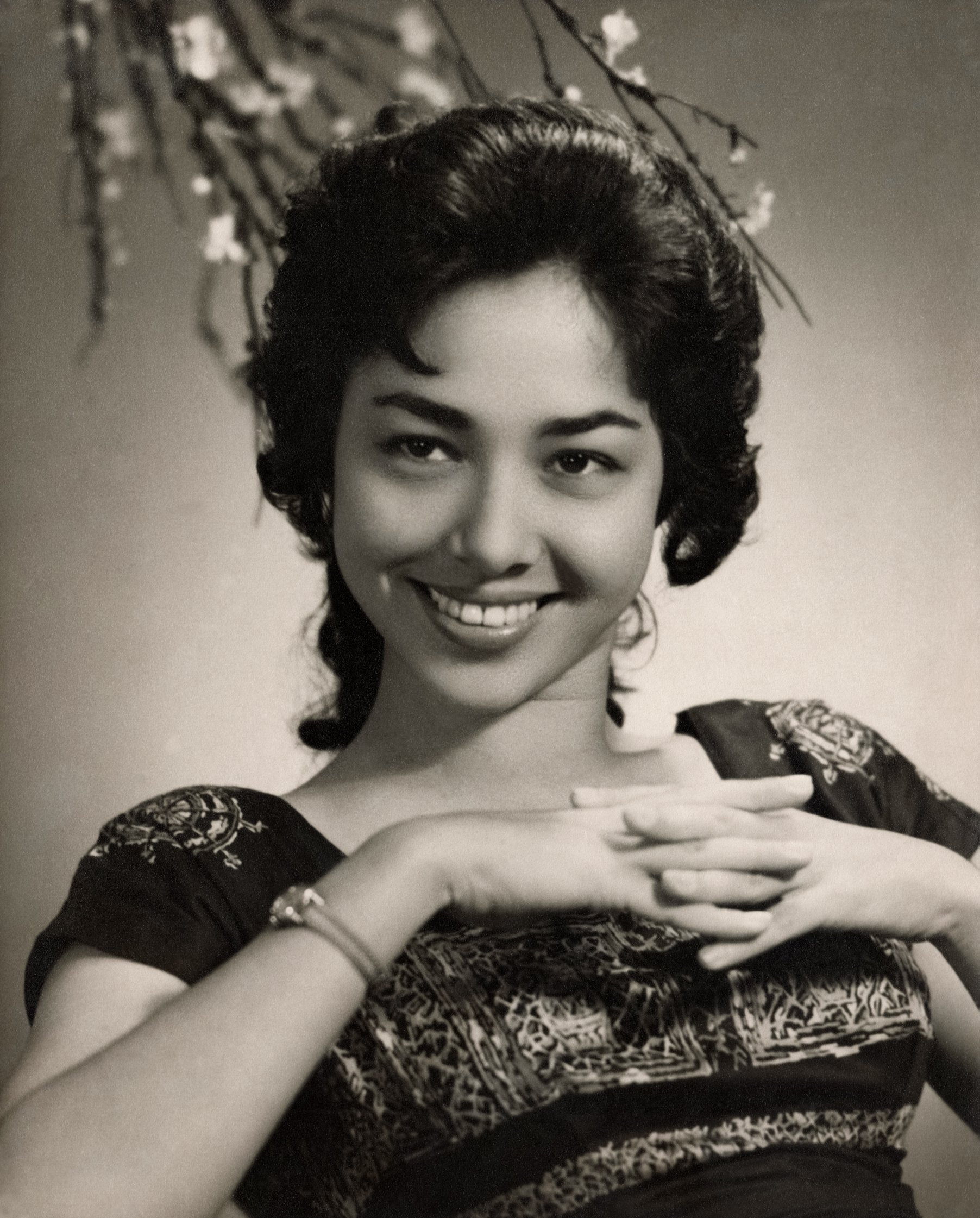
Mieke Wijaya won a Citra Award in 1975.

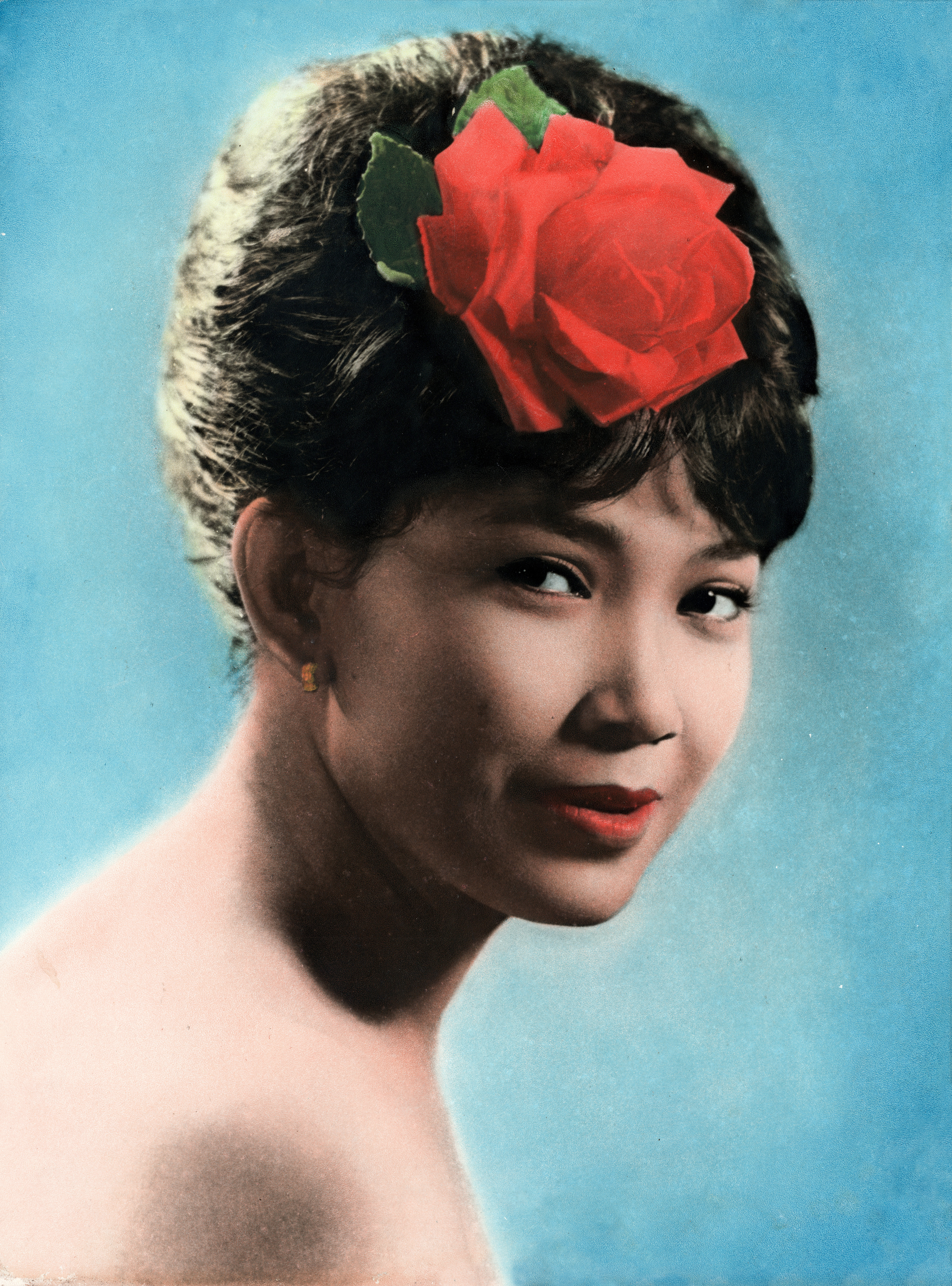
Rima Melati was nominated for five Citra Awards, but never won any.

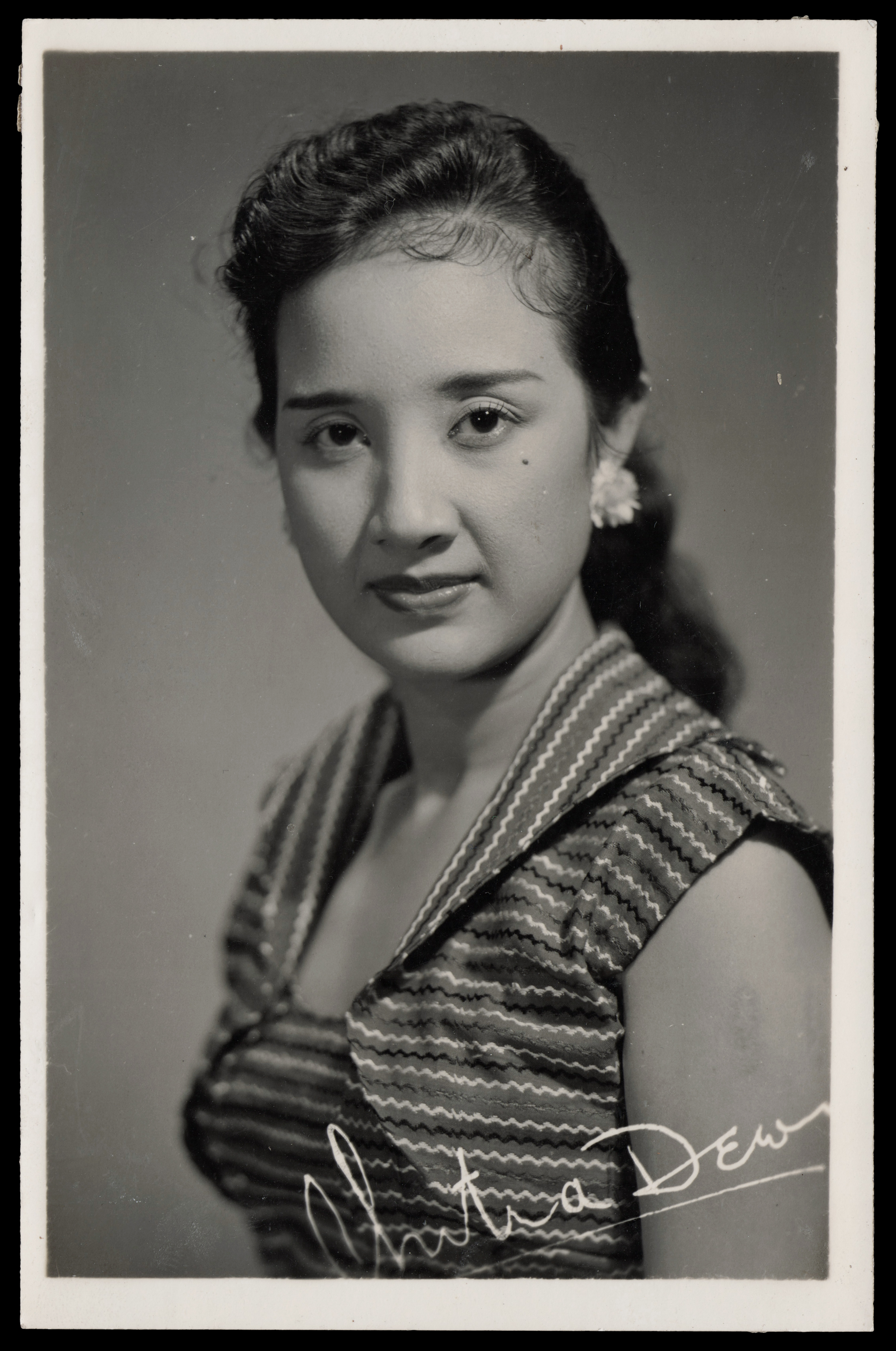
Chitra Dewi won the award in 1979.

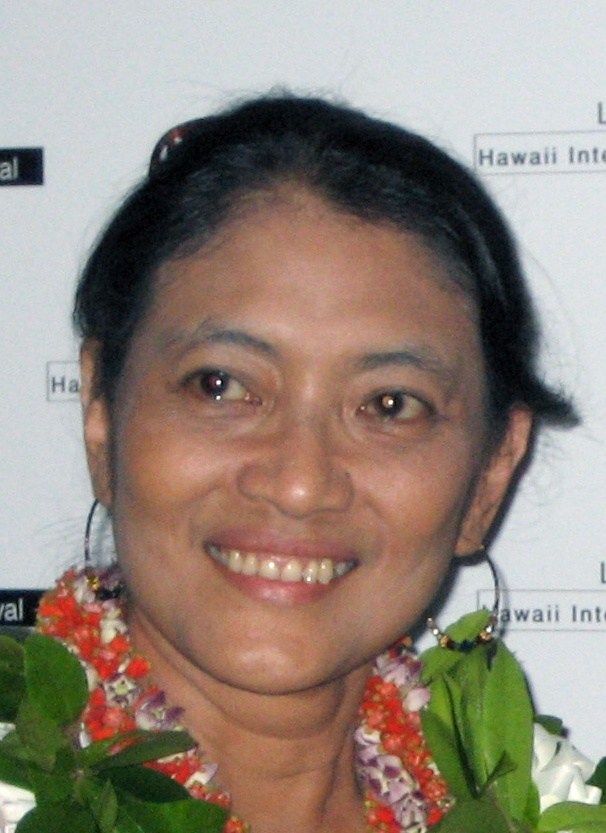
Jajang C. Noer won two Citra Award for Best Supporting Actress.

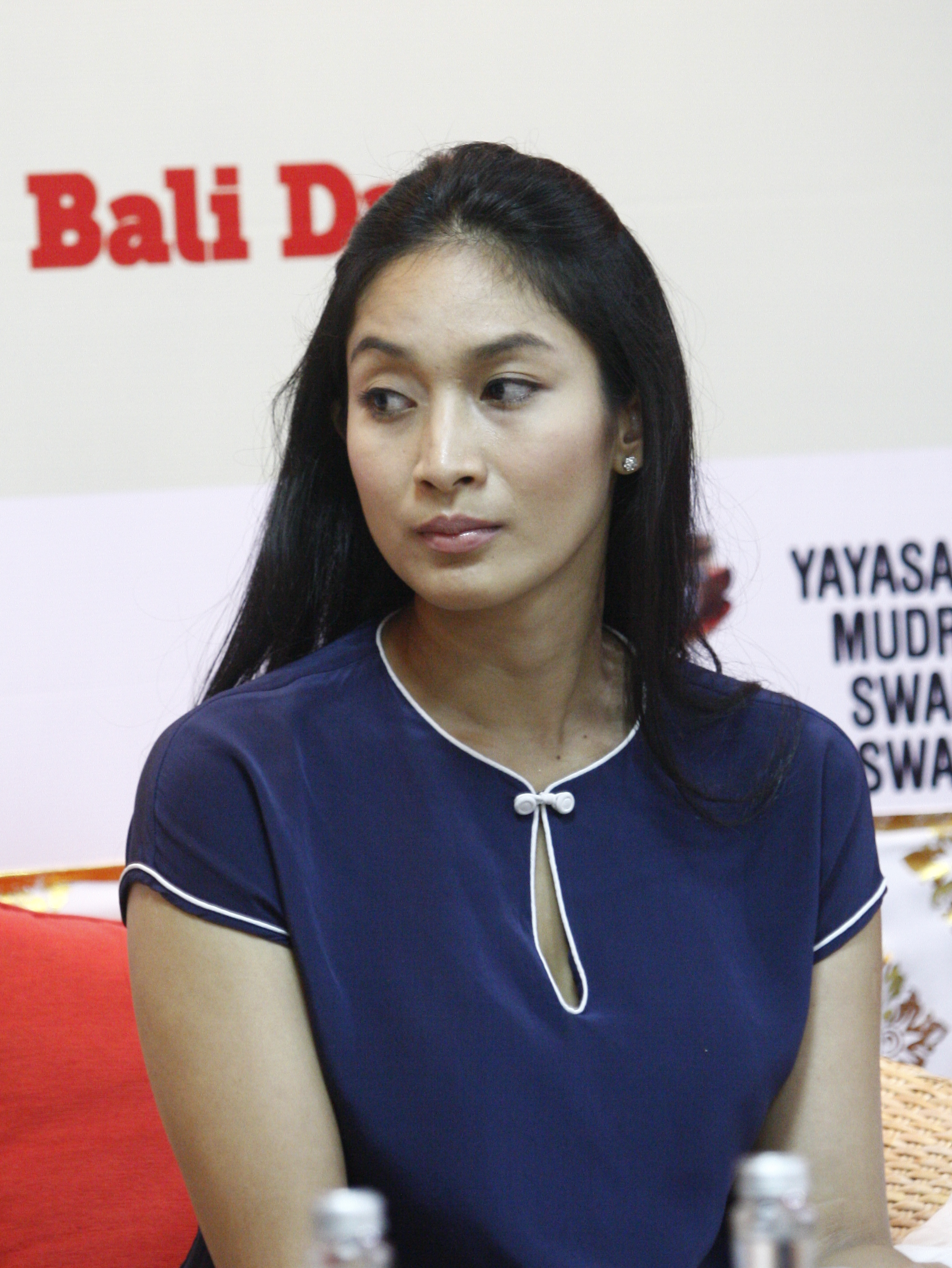
Happy Salma won a Citra Award in 2010 for 7 Hati 7 Cinta 7 Wanita.

=== 1950s ===
Year	Recipient	Film	Ref
1955 (1st)	Endang Kusdiningsih	Tarmina	
1955 (1st)	1956	NOT HELD	
1957	NOT HELD		
1958	NOT HELD		
1959	NOT HELD		

=== 1960s ===
Year	Recipient	Film	Ref
1960 (2nd)	Mpok Ani	Tiga Buronan	
1961	NOT HELD		
1962	NOT HELD		
1963	NOT HELD		
1964	NOT HELD		
1965	NOT HELD		
1966	NOT HELD		
1967 (3rd)	Marlia Hardi	Petir Sepandjang Malam	
1968	NOT HELD		
1969	NOT HELD		

=== 1970s ===
Year	Recipient	Film	Ref
1970	NOT HELD		
1971	NOT HELD		
1972	NOT HELD		
1973 (4th)	Sofia WD	Mutiara dalam Lumpur	
1974 (5th)	NOT AWARDED		(Note: No supporting actress award was given this year.)
1975 (6th)	Mieke Wijaya	Ranjang Pengantin	
1976 (7th)	Ruth Pelupessy	Rahasia Perawan	
1977 (8th)	Widyawati	Semoga Kau Kembali	
1978 (9th)	Nani Widjaja	Yang Muda Yang Bercinta	
1979 (10th)	Chitra Dewi	Gara-gara Isteri Muda	
1979 (10th)	Erni Tanjung	Buaya Deli	
1979 (10th)	Rahayu Effendi	Pacar Pilihan	
1979 (10th)	Rina Hasyim	Rahasia Perkawinan	
1979 (10th)	Ully Artha	Pengemis dan Tukang Becak	

=== 1980s ===
Year	Recipient	Film	Ref
1980 (11th)	Christine Sukendar	Rembulan dan Matahari	
1980 (11th)	Rae Sita	Perawan Desa	
1980 (11th)	Tutie Kirana	Buah Terlarang	
1981 (12th)	Ita Mustafa	Gadis Penakluk	
1981 (12th)	Dhalia	Usia 18	
1981 (12th)	Nani Widjaja	Bukan Sandiwara	
1981 (12th)	Rini S. Bono	Perempuan dalam Pasungan	
1982 (13th)	Suparmi	Serangan Fajar	
1982 (13th)	Dhalia	Bukan Istri Pilihan	
1982 (13th)	Rina Hasyim	Gondoruwo	
1982 (13th)	Roldiah Matulessy	Jangan Ambil Nyawaku	
1982 (13th)	Titi Qadarsih	Jangan Ambil Nyawaku	
1983 (14th)	Nani Widjaja (2)	R. A. Kartini	
1983 (14th)	Sylvia Widiantono	Di Balik Kelambu	
1983 (14th)	Tuti Indra Malaon	Neraca Kasih	
1984 (15th)	Dana Christina	Lebak Membara	(Note: No supporting actress award was given this year.); No winner
1984 (15th)	Nani Widjaja	Yang	No winner
1984 (15th)	Rima Melati	Kupu-Kupu Putih	No winner
1985 (16th)	Marissa Haque	Tinggal Landas buat Kekasih	
1985 (16th)	Rima Melati	Tinggal Landas buat Kekasih	
1985 (16th)	Ria Irawan	Kembang Kertas	
1985 (16th)	Lenny Marlina	Kembang Kertas	
1986 (17th)	Niniek L. Karim	Ibunda	
1986 (17th)	Ria Irawan	Bila Saatnya Tiba	
1986 (17th)	Rima Melati	Pondok Cinta	
1986 (17th)	Rina Hasyim	Beri Aku Waktu	
1986 (17th)	Ully Artha	Kejarlah Daku Kau Kutangkap	
1987 (18th)	Roldiah Matulessy	Nagabonar	
1987 (18th)	Joice Erna	Arini (Masih Ada Kereta yang Akan Lewat)	
1987 (18th)	Rima Melati	Biarkan Bulan Itu	
1987 (18th)	Tutie Kirana	Tinggal Sesaat Lagi	
1988 (19th)	Ria Irawan	Selamat Tinggal Jeanette	
1988 (19th)	Ira Wibowo	Kasmaran	
1988 (19th)	Nani Widjaja	Selamat Tinggal Jeanette	
1988 (19th)	Rina Hasyim	Akibat Kanker Payudara	
1988 (19th)	Rita Zahara	Tjoet Nja' Dhien	
1989 (20th)	Niniek L. Karim (2)	Pacar Ketinggalan Kereta	
1989 (20th)	Lia Chaidir	Tragedi Bintaro	
1989 (20th)	Nurul Arifin	Pacar Ketinggalan Kereta	
1989 (20th)	Rima Melati	Arini II (Biarkan Kereta Api Itu Lewat)	

=== 1990s ===
Year	Recipient	Film	Ref
1990 (21st)	Ayu Azhari	Dua Kekasih	
1990 (21st)	Paramitha Rusady	Blok M	
1990 (21st)	Suparmi	Langitku Rumahku	
1991 (22nd)	Rina Hasyim	Zig Zag (Anak Jalanan)	
1991 (22nd)	Btari Karlinda	Rebo dan Robby	
1991 (22nd)	Ully Artha	Potret	
1992 (23rd)	Jajang C. Noer	Bibir Mer	
1992 (23rd)	Paramitha Rusady	Kuberikan Segalanya	
1992 (23rd)	Nunu Datau	Rini Tomboy	
1993	NOT HELD		
1994	NOT HELD		
1995	NOT HELD		
1996	NOT HELD		
1997	NOT HELD		
1998	NOT HELD		
1999	NOT HELD		

=== 2000s ===
Year	Recipient	Film	Ref
2000	NOT HELD		
2001	NOT HELD		
2002	NOT HELD		
2003	NOT HELD		
2004 (24th)	Rachel Maryam	Arisan!	
2004 (24th)	Ladya Cheryl	Ada Apa dengan Cinta?	
2004 (24th)	Megarita	Marsinah: Cry Justice	
2005 (25th)	Adinia Wirasti	Tentang Dia	
2005 (25th)	Elmayana Sabrenia	Brownies	
2005 (25th)	Rachel Maryam	Janji Joni	
2005 (25th)	Sausan Machari	Detik Terakhir	
2005 (25th)	Wulan Guritno	Gie	
2006 (26th)	Kinaryosih	Mendadak Dangdut	
2006 (26th)	Ira Maya Sopha	Berbagi Suami	
2006 (26th)	Reggy Lawalata	Ruang	
2006 (26th)	Ria Irawan	Berbagi Suami	
2006 (26th)	Rieke Diah Pitaloka	Berbagi Suami	
2007 (27th)	Meriam Bellina	Get Married	
2007 (27th)	Henidar Amroe	Love Is Cinta	
2007 (27th)	Ira Wibowo	Mengejar Mas-Mas	
2007 (27th)	Shanty	Kala	
2007 (27th)	Shanty	Maaf, Saya Menghamili Istri Anda	
2008 (28th)	Aryani Kiergenburg Willems	Under the Tree	
2008 (28th)	Ira Maya Sopha	Claudia/Jasmine	
2008 (28th)	Poppy Sovia	The Butterfly	
2008 (28th)	Tizza Radia	Claudia/Jasmine	
2008 (28th)	Tutie Kirana	May	
2009 (29th)	Henidar Amroe	Mereka Bilang, Saya Monyet!	
2009 (29th)	Ayu Pratiwi	Emak Ingin Naik Haji	
2009 (29th)	Niniek L. Karim	Ketika Cinta Bertasbih 2	
2009 (29th)	Widyawati	Perempuan Berkalung Sorban	

=== 2010s ===
Year	Recipient	Film	Ref
2010 (30th)	Happy Salma	7 Hati 7 Cinta 7 Wanita	
2010 (30th)	Ella Hamid	Minggu Pagi di Victoria Park	
2010 (30th)	Henidar Amroe	3 Hati Dua Dunia Satu Cinta	
2010 (30th)	Intan Kieflie	7 Hati 7 Cinta 7 Wanita	
2010 (30th)	Kimmy Jayanti	I Know What You Did on Facebook	
2011 (31st)	Dewi Irawan	Sang Penari	
2011 (31st)	Atiqah Hasiholan	The Mirror Never Lies	
2011 (31st)	Endhita	?	
2011 (31st)	Poppy Sovia	Catatan Harian Si Boy	
2011 (31st)	Wulan Guritno	Masih Bukan Cinta Biasa	
2012 (32nd)	Mak Gondut	Demi Ucok	
2012 (32nd)	Christine Hakim	Raya Cahaya Di Atas Cahaya	
2012 (32nd)	Kenes Andari	Hello Goodbye	
2012 (32nd)	Meriam Bellina	Test Pack: You're My Baby	
2012 (32nd)	Wulan Guritno	Dilema	
2013 (33rd)	Jajang C. Noer (2)	Cinta Tapi Beda	
2013 (33rd)	Ayushita	What They Don't Talk About When They Talk About Love	
2013 (33rd)	Dewi Irawan	Rectoverso	
2013 (33rd)	Meriza Febriani	Sang Kiai	
2013 (33rd)	Poppy Sovia	Merry Go Round	
2014 (34th)	Tika Bravani	Soekarno	
2014 (34th)	Jajang C. Noer	3 Nafas Likas	
2014 (34th)	Laura Basuki	Haji Backpacker	
2014 (34th)	Nirina Zubir	Silent Hero(es)	
2014 (34th)	Jajang C. Noer	Cahaya Dari Timur: Beta Maluku	
2015 (35th)	Christine Hakim	Pendekar Tongkat Emas	
2015 (35th)	Prisia Nasution	Comic 8: Casino Kings Part 1	
2015 (35th)	Raline Shah	Surga Yang Tak Dirindukan	
2015 (35th)	Ria Irawan	Bulan Diatas Kuburan	
2015 (35th)	Wulan Guritno	Nada Untuk Asa	
2016 (36th)	Raihaanun	Salawaku	
2016 (36th)	Sissy Priscilla	Ada Apa Dengan Cinta? 2	
2016 (36th)	Lydia Kandou	Aisyah: Biarkan Kami Bersaudara	
2016 (36th)	Titiek Puspa	Ini Kisah Tiga Dara	
2016 (36th)	Widyawati	Surat Dari Praha	
2017 (37th)	Christine Hakim (2)	Kartini	
2017 (37th)	Adinia Wirasti	Check the Store Next Door	
2017 (37th)	Cut Mini	Posesif	
2017 (37th)	Djenar Maesa Ayu	Kartini	
2017 (37th)	Marissa Anita	Galih & Ratna	
2017 (37th)	Niniek L. Karim	Sweet 20	
2017 (37th)	Widyawati	Sweet 20	
2018 (38th)	Dea Panendra	Marlina the Murderer in Four Acts	
2018 (38th)	Ayu Laksmi	The Seen and the Unseen	
2018 (38th)	Dewi Irawan	Ayat-Ayat Cinta 2	
2018 (38th)	Hannah Al Rashid	Aruna & Her Palate	
2018 (38th)	Karina Suwandi	May the Devil Take You	
2018 (38th)	Ruth Marini	Wiro Sableng 212 Warrior	
2019 (39th)	Cut Mini	Two Blue Stripes	
2019 (39th)	Asri Welas	Cemara's Family	
2019 (39th)	Ayu Laksmi	This Earth of Mankind	
2019 (39th)	Laudya Cynthia Bella	Ambu	
2019 (39th)	Lulu Tobing	Two Blue Stripes	
2019 (39th)	Tutie Kirana	Mantan Manten	

=== 2020s ===
Year	Recipient	Film	Ref
2020 (40th)	Christine Hakim (3)	Impetigore	
2020 (40th)	Asmara Abigail	Homecoming	
2020 (40th)	Asri Welas	Crazy Awesome Teachers	
2020 (40th)	Dewi Irawan	Imperfect	
2020 (40th)	Marissa Anita	Impetigore	
2020 (40th)	Ratna Riantiarno	Love for Sale 2	
2020 (40th)	Ria Irawan	Mecca I'm Coming	
2021 (41st)	Marissa Anita	Ali & Ratu Ratu Queens	
2021 (41st)	Asmara Abigail	Yuni	
2021 (41st)	Asri Welas	Ali & Ratu Ratu Queens	
2021 (41st)	Dea Panendra	Photocopier	
2021 (41st)	Djenar Maesa Ayu	Bete's Love	
2022 (42nd)	Putri Marino	Losmen Bu Broto	
2022 (42nd)	Laura Basuki	Before, Now & Then	
2022 (42nd)	Maudy Ayunda	Losmen Bu Broto	
2022 (42nd)	Ratu Felisha	Vengeance Is Mine, All Others Pay Cash	
2022 (42nd)	Sheila Dara Aisha	The Red Point of Marriage	
2023 (43rd)	Prilly Latuconsina	Andragogy	
2023 (43rd)	Aulia Sarah	Like & Share	
2023 (43rd)	Christine Hakim	Sara	
2023 (43rd)	Dewi Irawan	24 Hours with Gaspar	
2023 (43rd)	Lutesha	The Big 4	
2024 (44th)	Sheila Dara Aisha	Falling In Love Like In Movies	
2024 (44th)	Asmara Abigail	Till Death Do Us Part	
2024 (44th)	Lutesha	Goodbye, Farewell	
2024 (44th)	Widuri Puteri	Grave Torture	
2024 (44th)	Zulfa Maharani	Crocodile Tears	
2025 (45th)	Christine Hakim	On Your Lap	
2025 (45th)	Artika Sari Devi	A Woman Called Mother	
2025 (45th)	Hana Malasan	The Shadow Strays	
2025 (45th)	Raihaanun	Gowok: Javanese Kamasutra	

== Multiple wins and nominations ==
Wins	Nominations	Actress
3	5	Christine Hakim
2	5	Nani Widjaja
2	4	Jajang C. Noer, Niniek L. Karim
1	6	Ria Irawan
1	5	Dewi Irawan, Rina Hasyim
1	4	Widyawati
1	3	Henidar Amroe, Marissa Anita
1	2	Adinia Wirasti, Cut Mini, Dea Panendra, Meriam Bellina, Rachel Maryam, Roldiah Matulessy, Suparmi
0	5	Rima Melati
0	4	Tutie Kirana, Wulan Guritno
0	3	Asri Welas, Poppy Sovia, Ully Artha
0	2	Asmara Abigail, Ayu Laksmi, Dhalia, Djenar Maesa Ayu, Ira Maya Sopha, Ira Wibowo, Laura Basuki, Paramitha Rusady, Shanty

== See also ==
- Cinema of Indonesia
- Indonesian Film Festival
- Citra Award for Best Picture
- Citra Award for Best Director
- Citra Award for Best Actor
- Citra Award for Best Actress
- Citra Award for Best Supporting Actor
- Maya Awards
