= Sigi Wimala =

Indonesian actress and model

- Born: Sigi Wimala Somya Dewi; June 21, 1983 (age 42); Jakarta, Indonesia
- Occupations: Model, Celebrity
- Spouse: Timo Tjahjanto (m. 2009; div. 2021)
- Children: 2

Sigi Wimala Somya Dewi, more popularly known simply as Sigi Wimala (born June 21, 1983) is an Indonesian model and actress.

== Career ==
In 1999, she won a cover girl contest, GADIS Sampul, a teen magazine in Indonesia. She later joined Elite Models and modeled in Hong Kong for a year. In 2015 the Jakarta Globe reported Sigi Wimala was "working on a new clothing line for Muslim women, featuring sportswear attached with hijabs".

Sigi Wimala started her career on the big screen with a starring role in the box office hit Tentant Dia (About Her) directed by Rudy Soedjarwo, which won Best New Coming Actress in Indonesian Movie Award 2007. She then starred in various features including two horror films, Macabre and Affair.

While she studied architecture at Tarumanegara University, she also took photography course. Her photographs were included in numerous group exhibitions such as Trowulan (2006) at the Museum Nasional (Jakarta) and Singkawang Jade of Equator (2010) at Galeri Salihara, together with artists such as Jay Subyakto, Yori Antar and Oscar Motuloh.

She then came to directing a music video for RAN, an Indonesian pop group and later on directed her first short film, Boy Crush, produced by the Indonesian film director, Garin Nugroho.

== Personal life ==
In 2009, she married Timo Tjahjanto from the Mo Brothers, film director. They met on the set of Macabre. They quietly divorced in 2021.

== Filmography ==
=== As actress ===
==== Feature films ====
- Tentang Dia (2005)
- Kalau Cinta Jangan Cengeng (2005)
- Cinta Setaman (2008)
- Krazy Crazy Krezy (2009)
- Macabre (2009)
- Affair (2010)
- Hi5teria (segment "Wayang Koelit") (2012)
- Satria Dewa: Gatotkaca (2021)

==== Web series ====
- Catharsis (web series) (2023)

=== As director ===
- "Friday" (RAN) music video
- "Boy Crush", short film, 2009

== Awards and nominations ==
Year	Award	Category	Recipients	Result
2005	Indonesian Film Festival	Citra Award for Best Leading Actress	Tentang Dia	Nominated
