= Galang (film) =

2022 film by Adriyanto Dewo

- Film poster
- Directed by: Adriyanto Dewo
- Written by: Tumpal Tampubolon
- Produced by: Syaiful Wathan; Amanda Iswan
- Starring: Elang El Gibran; Asmara Abigail; Agra Piliang
- Cinematography: Tri Adi Prasetyo
- Edited by: Arifin Cuunk
- Music by: Hinhin Agung Daryana
- Production companies: Rich Music; Skena Raya Abadi; Swan Studio
- Release date: 16 October 2022 (Jakarta)
- Running time: 103 minutes
- Country: Indonesia
- Language: Indonesian

Galang is a 2022 Indonesian drama film directed by Adriyanto Dewo and written by Tumpal Tampubolon. Elang El Gibran stars as the title character, a man determined to uncover the truth behind the tragic death of his sister at an underground music concert. It also stars Asmara Abigail and Agra Piliang. The film is loosely inspired by the 2008 Bandung stampede.

The film had its world premiere at the Jakarta Film Week on 16 October 2022. It received two Indonesian Screen Awards for Best Directing (Dewo) and Best Storytelling (Tampubolon) at the 17th Jogja-NETPAC Asian Film Festival.

== Premise ==
Galang, a young man, poses as a fan of the underground rock band Axfiksia to investigate his sister's death during one of the band's concerts. During his investigation, he forms a friendship with Asmara, the band's manager.

== Cast ==
- Elang El Gibran as Galang
- Asmara Abigail as Asmara
- Agra Piliang as Irfan
- Kiki Narendra as Galang's father
- Jenny Zhang as Galang's mother
- Laras Sardi as Maryam
- Gaharaiden as Jodi
- Iqbal Mawardi as Arya
- XPrayoga as Drummer

== Production ==
In October 2021, it was reported that Galang, a film loosely inspired by the 2008 Bandung stampede and the city's underground music scene, had been in production. It was intended to be theatrically released in Indonesia in December 2021, but cancelled due to the COVID-19 pandemic.

In an interview with Medcom, director Adriyanto Dewo stated that the film originated after he was invited by the producers to engage in discussions with several Bandung-based rock musicians, including Ebenz and Kimung of Burgerkill. Principal photography took place in Bandung, West Java, in October 2021.

== Release ==
Galang had its world premiere at the 2022 Jakarta Film Week on 16 October. It also competed for Indonesian Screen Awards at the 17th Jogja-NETPAC Asian Film Festival, where it won two awards for Best Directing and Best Storytelling. It had its international premiere at the 2023 CinemAsia Film Festival on 8 March. It was also screened at the 27th Bucheon International Fantastic Film Festival at the Merry-Go-Round section on 30 June 2023.

== Accolades ==
| Award / Film Festival | Date of ceremony | Category | Recipient(s) | Result | Ref. |
|---|---|---|---|---|---|
| Jakarta Film Week | 16 October 2022 | Direction Award | Adriyanto Dewo | Nominated | |
| Jogja-NETPAC Asian Film Festival | 3 December 2022 | Indonesian Screen Award for Best Directing | Adriyanto Dewo | Won | |
| Jogja-NETPAC Asian Film Festival | 3 December 2022 | Indonesian Screen Award for Best Storytelling | Tumpal Tampubolon | Won | |
