= Pacar Ketinggalan Kereta =

- Poster
- Directed by: Teguh Karya
- Written by: Arswendo Atmowiloto
- Produced by: Irwan Usmar Ismail
- Starring: Rachmat Hidayat; Tuti Indra Malaon; Niniek L. Karim; Nurul Arifin; Onky Alexander; Alex Komang; Didi Petet; Ayu Azhari; Camelia Malik
- Cinematography: Roy Julius Tobing
- Music by: Idris Sardi
- Release date: October 1989
- Running time: 139 minutes
- Country: Indonesia
- Language: Indonesian

Pacar Ketinggalan Kereta (Lover Left by the Train) is a 1989 film by Indonesian director Teguh Karya. It was his last feature film.

== Plot ==
At a party celebrating the Padmos (Rachmat Hidayat and Tuti Indra Malaon) 25th wedding anniversary, a fit of jealousy breaks out. Mrs Padmo is jealous of her husband's secretary, Retno (Niniek L. Karim), who often rides in the same car as Mr Padmo. Meanwhile, the Padmos' son Heru (Onky Alexander) is with Ipah (Nurul Arifin), while the family's driver Martubi (Alex Komang) is with Retno's maid Juminten (Nani Vidia). This situation is exacerbated by the Padmos' daughter Riri (Ayu Azhari) dating Retno's son Arsal (Iwen Darmanyah). This leads to numerous misunderstandings, which are worked out by the end of the film.

== Production ==
Pacar Ketinggalan Kereta was directed by Teguh Karya, a Chinese-Indonesian director who had made numerous critically acclaimed films, including November 1828 (1978) and Ibunda (Mother; 1986). It was Karya's last feature film.

Casting had begun by February 1988. Ayu Azhari, who had previously appeared in several of Karya's works, took a small role. Tuti Indra Malaon, another actress who had appeared in several of Karya's works, was cast as Mrs. Padmo; this was her last film role, as she died shortly before the film's premiere.

The film featured the song "Kijang Muda" ("Young Buck"), by Ruth Sahanaya.

== Style ==
Pacar Ketinggalan Kereta is quickly paced, due in part to its large cast. The storytelling technique, using three different and seemingly unrelated sets of characters before the climax united them all, was reminiscent of Usmar Ismail's film Tiga Dara (Three Girls; 1956); indeed, Karya had shown the cast this film before production began in October 1988. The film invokes aspects of a musical, but the music lacks integration with the story; this fault was common in Indonesian attempts at musicals in the 1980s.

== Release and reception ==
Pacar Ketinggalan Kerta was released in October 1989. It was the most-viewed Indonesian film of 1989.

The Indonesian writer Putu Wijaya, reviewing in Tempo magazine, wrote that the film began quickly and moved fast enough to confuse viewers, but was concluded well.

== Awards ==
Pacar Ketinggalan Kereta was nominated for thirteen Citra Awards at the 1989 Indonesian Film Festival, winning eight. This success was protested by Tempo writers Budiono Darsono and Putu Setia, who found Pacar Ketinggalan Kereta one of Karya's weaker films and commented that it seemed to be intended to win as many Citra Awards as possible. At the 1989 Bandung Film Festival, it won three awards.

| Award | Year | Category | Recipient | Result |
|---|---|---|---|---|
| Indonesian Film Festival | 1989 | Best Film | | Won |
| Indonesian Film Festival | 1989 | Best Director | Teguh Karya | Won |
| Indonesian Film Festival | 1989 | Best Artistic Arrangement | Adji Mamat Borneo | Won |
| Indonesian Film Festival | 1989 | Best Editing | Karsono Hadi | Won |
| Indonesian Film Festival | 1989 | Best Sound Arrangement | Iwan Mauritz | Won |
| Indonesian Film Festival | 1989 | Best Leading Actor | Rachmat Hidayat | Won |
| Indonesian Film Festival | 1989 | Best Leading Actress | Tuti Indra Malaon | Won |
| Indonesian Film Festival | 1989 | Best Screenplay | Teguh Karya, Arswendo Atmowiloto | Nominated |
| Indonesian Film Festival | 1989 | Best Supporting Actress | Nurul Arifin | Nominated |
| Indonesian Film Festival | 1989 | Best Supporting Actress | Niniek L Karim | Won |
| Indonesian Film Festival | 1989 | Best Cinematography | Herman Susilo | Nominated |
| Indonesian Film Festival | 1989 | Best Musical Arrangement | Idris Sardi | Nominated |
| Bandung Film Festival | 1989 | Best Director | Teguh Karya | Won |
| Bandung Film Festival | 1989 | Best Artistic Arrangement | Adji Mamat Borneo | Won |
| Bandung Film Festival | 1989 | Best Editing | Karsono Hadi | Won |
| Indonesian Film Festival | 1990 | Best Selling Film of 1989 | | Won |
| Bandung Film Festival | 1990 | Best Film | | Won |
