= Ayu Azhari =

Indonesian actress, model, author (born 1969)

- Born: Siti Khadijah Azhari; November 19, 1969 (age 56); Jakarta, Indonesia
- Occupations: Model, author
- Spouses: Wisnu Djody Gondokusumo; Teemu Yusuf Ibrahim; Mike Tramp (m. 2004)
- Awards: Citra Award for Best Supporting Actress

Siti Khadijah Azhari (born 19 November 1969), better known as Ayu Azhari, is an Indonesian actress, model and author of mixed Indian and Sundanese descent.

== Biography ==
Azhari was born on 19 November 1966. She comes from Bangka, the oldest of seven children of H. Abdullah Azhari and Hj. Khairani.

Azhari made her feature film début in 1984 in Akibat Buah Terlarang (Effects from the Forbidden Fruit). Director Teguh Karya, who saw her in the film, adopted her as a protégée. Her first role for him was as a minor character in the stage drama Pernikahan Darah (Blood Wedding), in which the director badgered her for not carrying her voice. In 1986 she played in Karya's film Ibunda (Mother). She took a small role in Karya's last feature film, Pacar Ketinggalan Kereta (Lover Left by the Train) in 1989.

In 1990, Azhari received a Citra Award for Best Supporting Actress at the Indonesian Film Festival for her role in Dua Kekasih (Two Lovers)

By the early 2000s, Azhari was one of the highest paid television stars in Indonesia. It was rumoured that she earned Rp. 20 million (US$2,200) per episode, a rumour which Azhari denied. She had also released a studio album, Dung Indung.

In 2003, Azhari wrote a book on the dangers of voyeurism after her sister, Sarah, was one of several female celebrities portrayed changing their clothes on an underground VCD. Research for the book included interviewing victims of voyeurism. When it was finished, three publishers offered to take the book.

In 2010, Azhari registered with the Indonesian Democratic Party – Struggle (Partai Demokrat Indonesia – Perjuangan) to run for Deputy Regent of Sukabumi Regency. She reportedly invested Rp. 10 billion (US$1.1 million) in her campaign. During her political campaign, her opponents spread racy pictures of a woman resembling her with Frank Zagarino; Azhari took it as an attempt to discredit her. She was ultimately not chosen to run.

In late 2011, Azhari released a cookbook filled with Bangkan recipes.

== Personal life ==
Azhari has been married several times. Her first marriage was in 1990 to Djody Gondokusumo, with whom she had a son. Within four years she had married Teemu Yusuf Ibrahim and had another two sons and one daughter. As of 2010, she is married to musician Mike Tramp, best known as the vocalist of the hard rock band White Lion. She has a total of six children.

== Filmography ==
=== Film ===
Key
†	Denotes films that have not yet been released

Acting Role
Year	Title	Role	Note
1984	Bercinta dalam Badai	Nina	
1984	Akibat Buah Terlarang	Ayuna	
1985	Gejolak Cinta Pertama	Lydia	
1985	Preman	Dyah Setiowati	
1985	Perceraian	Ayu	
1986	Sama Juga Bohong	Ayu	
1986	Ibunda	Istri Fikar	
1987	Catatan Si Boy	Nucke	
1987	Luka di Atas Luka		
1988	Harga Sebuah Kejujuran	Aline	
1988	Pacar Ketinggalan Kereta	Riri	
1989	Rio Sang Juara	Sinta	
1990	Ikut-ikutan	Rosa	
1990	Dua Kekasih	Tari	
1990	Gonta-ganti	Siska	
1990	Jawara Sok Kota		
1991	Ojek	Evi	
1991	Taksi Juga	Mona	
1992	Oeroeg	Sati	
1992	Selembut Wajah Anggun	Cindy	
1993	Mumpung Ada Kesempatan		
1993	Lembaran Biru	Irna	
1993	Badut-Badut Kota	Menul	
1993	Tahu Beres	Desy	
1994	Pemburu Teroris	Tanya	
1994	Surgaku Nerakaku	Ani	
1994	Suami, Istri dan Kekasih	Alexandra	
1994	Catatan Harian Tante Sonya	Sonya	
1997	Telegram	Rosa	
2004	Virgin: Ketika Keperawanan Dipertanyakan	Guru sastra	
2010	Sssstt... Jadikan Aku Simpanan	Mbak Sum	
2010	Sweetheart	Cynthia	
2011	Si Anak Kampoeng		
2011	L4 Lupus	Cakrawati	
2013	Dream Obama	Maryam	
2014	Strawberry Surprise	Mama Aggi	
2018	Aruna & Lidahnya	Mbak Priya	
2022	Noktah Merah Perkawinan	Kartika	
2026	Suamiku Lukaku †		

=== Television Series ===
Tahun	Judul	Peran	Catatan
1993	Lika-Liku Laki-Laki	Ruminten	
1994	Benang Emas	Andiani	
1995	Ada Ada Saja	Inneke	Episode 83—84
1996—1999	Noktah Merah Perkawinan	Ambarwati	
1996	Mentari di Balik Awan	Nina	
1997	Si Kabayan	Nyi Iteung	
1997—1998	Istri Pilihan	Nia/Rika	
1998	Selalu untuk Selamanya	Mira	
1999	Perkawinan Rahasia		
1999	Cinta Tia Maria	Tia Maria	
1999—2001	Panji Manusia Millenium	Nina Bobo	
1999—2000	Kesucian Prasasti	Prasasti Lumintasari	
2000	Di Antara Dua Pilihan	Leyla	
2000	Tali Kasih	Andrea	
2000	Ketabahan		
2000—2002	Bidadari	Ibu Peri Ratu / Bu Angel	Musim 1
2001—2002; 2004	Putri Duyung	Intana	2 musim
2003	Jasmine	Jasmine	
2004	Putri Salju	Lily/Putri Salju	
2005	Tersanjung	Indah Lestari	Pemeran ketiga; Musim 6 dan 7
2005	Adilkah	Indah Lestari	
2012	Mega Sinema	Sonya	Episode: "Tante Sonya"
2013	TV Movie		Episode: "Tamu dari Jakarta"
2018	Mimpi Metropolitan	Mama Melani	Episode 9 dan 61
2024	Keabadian	Ratna	
TBA	Surga Harapanku †		Mendatang

Key
†	Denotes films that have not yet been released

- TBA : To be announced

== Awards and nominations ==
Year	Award	Category	Work	Result
1990	Indonesian Film Festival	Citra Award for Best Supporting Actress	Dua Kekasih	Won
