= Hi5teria =

- Film poster
- Directed by: Adriyanto Dewo; Chairun Nissa; Billy Christian; Nicholas Yudifar; Harvan Agustriansyah
- Screenplay by: Daud Sumolang; Chairun Nissa; Billy Christian; Sungkono Pastra; Harvan Agustriansyah
- Produced by: Chand Parvez Servia; Fiaz Servia
- Starring: Tara Basro; Dion Wiyoko; Sigi Wimala; Maya Otos; Luna Maya; Kriss Hatta; Imelda Therinne; Poppy Sovia; Bella Esperances; Icha Nuraini; Ichi Nuraini
- Cinematography: Enggong Supardi
- Edited by: Cesa David Luckmansyah; Ryan Purwoko; Syarif Hidayat; Aaron Hasim; Yusep Permana.
- Music by: Tya Subiakto Satrio
- Production companies: Starvision Plus; UPI Productions
- Distributed by: Starvision Plus
- Release date: March 29, 2012
- Running time: 91 minutes
- Country: Indonesia
- Language: Indonesian

Hi5teria is a 2012 omnibus Indonesian horror-thriller film by Starvision Plus & UPI Productions. The film was directed by Adriyanto Dewo, Chairun Nissa, Billy Christian, Nicholas Yudifar and Harvan Agustriansyah; and also was written by Daud Sumolang, Chairun Nissa, Billy Christian, Sungkono Pastra and Harvan Agustriansyah. This film was released on 29 March 2012.

The film had premiered at the Bucheon International Fantastic Film Festival in South Korea. At the 2012 Maya Awards, Hi5teria subsequently nominated for category Best Omnibus Film.

== Plot ==
Hi5teria is a 5 thriller omnibus produced by Starvision & Upi Production, and directed by 5 young promising director. This project became from Upi Avianto to make an omnibus thriller from true story-tale in Indonesia.

=== Pasar Setan (Satan's Market) ===
- Directed by : Adriyanto Dewo
- Screenplay by : Daud Sumolang

Sari (Tara Basro) enlists the help of a hiker to find her husband (Egi Fedly), missing for three days in the jungle. But as they search, they seem to be stuck going in circles and, as night falls, the jungle becomes full of weird noises and mysterious sights. The hiker awakes one morning to find that Sari has disappeared. Where has she gone and what mystery lies hidden in the jungle?

=== Wayang Kulit (Shadow Puppet) ===
- Directed & Screenplay by : Chairun Nissa

An American female journalist (Maya Otos) is researching about an all female Wayang Kulit show. Her research causes her to experience mystical events, unknowingly becoming trapped.

=== Kotak Musik (Music Box) ===
- Directed & Screenplay by : Billy Christian

Farah (Luna Maya) is a young scientist who does not believe in ghosts or other mystical stories, as she knows there is a scientific explanation for everything that happens. However, after researching an old house, Farah is haunted by strange occurrences and a small child who asks her to play. Who is this child, and why does he keep asking Farah to play?

=== Palasik ===
- Directed by : Nicholas Yudifar
- Screenplay by : Sungkono Pastra

A father (Tumpal Tampubolon), a pregnant mother (Imelda Therinne), and their teenage daughter (Poppy Sovia) went for a vacation to a villa located in a small town in Bogor, Indonesia. What started as a joyful holiday turned into a nightmare when a ghost resembling a floating head with exposed and hanging body organs, called Palasik, continued to terrorize the family, especially the pregnant mother.

=== Loket (Basement) ===
- Directed & Screenplay by: Harvan Agustriansyah

On a dark quiet night, a ticket seller (Icha Nuraini) at a mall is surprised as somebody knocks on her window. The ticket seller is brought to the parking lot and witnesses a sadistic murder, which may be connected to her.

== Cast ==
=== Pasar Setan cast ===
- Tara Basro as Sari, the main protagonist in segment film
- Dion Wiyoko as Zul
- Egi Fedly as Jaka, Sari' husband

=== Wayang Koelit cast ===
- Sigi Wimala as Muni, a Sinden
- Maya Otos as Nicola, an American reporter
- Toto Rasiti as Oding, a Javanese arts guide

=== Kotak Musik cast ===
- Luna Maya as Farah
- Kriss Hatta as Teddy
- Dinda Kanya Dewi as Farah' sister
- Khiva Iskak as Security
- Jennye Awuy as Little Girl Ghost

=== Palasik cast ===
- Poppy Sovia as step-daughter
- Imelda Therinne as Vita, an pregnant woman
- Tumpal Tampubolon as father

=== Loket cast ===
- Bella Esperances as mysterious woman
- Ichi Nuraini as a ticket seller
