= The Exiles (2022 film) =

2022 Indonesian documentary film

- Poster
- Indonesian: Eksil
- Directed by: Lola Amaria
- Written by: Lola Amaria; Gunawan Rahardja
- Produced by: Lola Amaria
- Starring: Hartoni Ubes; Sarjio Mintardjo; Gede Arka
- Cinematography: Shalahuddin Siregar
- Production company: Lola Amaria Production
- Release date: 27 November 2022 (JAFF)
- Running time: 119 minutes
- Country: Indonesia
- Language: Indonesian

The Exiles (Indonesian: Eksil) is a 2022 Indonesian documentary film directed, co-written and produced by Lola Amaria in her feature documentary directorial debut.

It won the Best Documentary Feature Film at the 2023 Indonesian Film Festival and Best Film during the Indonesian Screen Awards section at the 17th Jogja-NETPAC Asian Film Festival.

== Premise ==
The Exiles follows the stories of Indonesian students who are stranded and unable to return to Indonesia after the events of the 30 September Movement in 1965. Apart from the interviews with the exiles, the stories are told through historical footage and animation recreations.

== Cast ==
- Hartoni Ubes as Self
- Sarjio Mintardjo as Self
- Gede Arka as Self
- Asahan Aidit as Self

== Release ==
The film had its world premiere at the 17th Jogja-NETPAC Asian Film Festival during the JAFF Indonesian Screen Awards competition program on 27 November 2022, where it won for Best Film. It had its international premiere at the CinemAsia Film Festival in March 2023.

It was given a limited theatrical release in Indonesia on 1 February 2024. It garnered a total of 63,045 admissions during its theatrical run.

== Accolades ==
| Award | Date of ceremony | Category | Recipient(s) | Result | Ref. |
|---|---|---|---|---|---|
| Jogja-NETPAC Asian Film Festival | 3 December 2022 | JAFF Indonesian Screen Awards – Best Film | Lola Amaria | Won | |
| Indonesian Film Festival | 14 November 2023 | Best Documentary Feature | Lola Amaria | Won | |
