= Rina Hasyim =

Indonesian actress

Rina Hassim
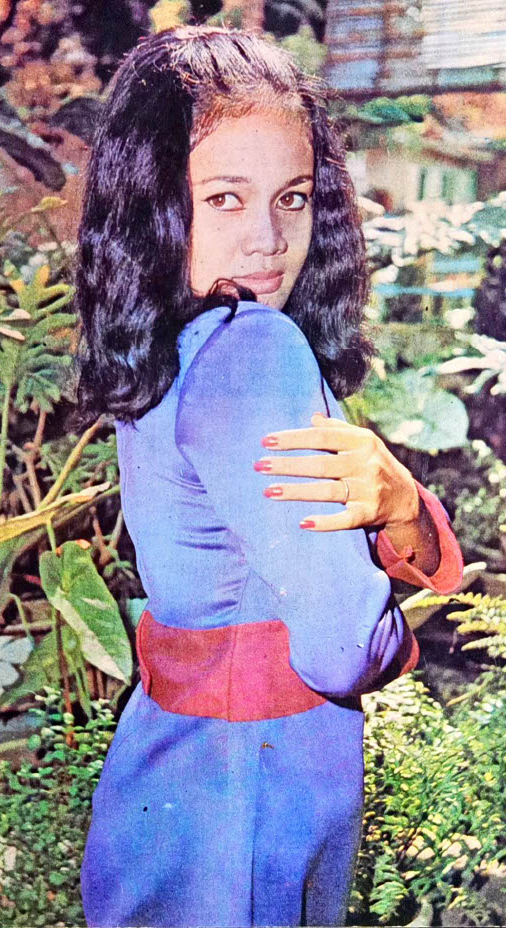
- Born: Rineke Antoinette Hassim; 29 April 1947 (age 79); Makassar, Indonesia
- Occupations: Actress; model
- Spouse: Chris Pattikawa (m. 1970; died 2020)
- Awards: Citra Award for Best Leading Actress; Citra Award for Best Supporting Actress

Rineke Antoinette Hassim (born 29 April 1947), best known by her stage name Rina Hasyim (also Hassim), is an Indonesian actress and model who has won both a Citra Award for Best Leading Actress and Citra Award for Best Supporting Actress.

== Biography ==
Rina Hasyim was born Rineke Antoinette Hassim on 29 April 1945 in Ujung Pandang a districts in Makassar, South Sulawesi. Raised strictly by her mother, she began rebelling and gravitated towards music. She was a member of the bands Dara Kusumah and Diskonit while a youth, playing the bass.

After completing senior high school, Hasyim moved to the national capital in Jakarta. Living with her aunt, she began to work at a travel agency. She was soon invited to start modelling by Rima Melati, an actress and model. In 1968 she obtained her first film role, a bit part, in Turino Djunaidy's Orang-orang Liar; she obtained the role when her coworker at the travel agency, Mochtar, introduced her to Djunaidy.

Hasyim soon married Chris Pattikawa, an employee at the national broadcaster TVRI; the two had two daughters named Jean Pattikawa (born 1970) and Yulia Pattikawa (born 1972) the following years. In 1970 she appeared in her second role, and first major one, playing a main character's girlfriend in the film Si Pitung. Over the next 25 years Hasyim acted in over a hundred films, sometimes six a year. In 1995 she made Gairah & Dosa, which proved her last feature film for over a decade. She instead focused on television. In 2007 Hasyim returned to cinema with Pocong 3, a horror film about pocong. She has acted in several films since then, though not at as high a rate as during the 1980s.

As of September 2013, Hasyim has acted in 113 films. She has been won several acting awards. In 1976 she won the Citra Award for Best Leading Actress for her role in Semalam di Malaysia. In 1987 her role in Akibat Kanker Payudara garnered her a Best Supporting Actress at the Asia Pacific Film Festival. Four years later, she won the Citra Award for Best Supporting Actress for her role in Zig Zag (Anak Jalanan); she had previously received five nominations for the award, in 1979, 1981, 1985, 1986, and 1988.

== Filmography ==
Source: (filmindonesia.or.id, Filmografi)

- Orang-Orang Liar (1968)
- Dibalik Pintu Dosa (1970)
- Samiun dan Dasima (1970)
- Si Pitung (1970)
- Banteng Betawi (1971)
- Biarkan Musim Berganti (1971)
- Malam Jahanam (1971)
- Derita Tiada Akhir (1971)
- Jang Djatuh Dikaki Lelaki (1971)
- Rakit (1971)
- Mereka Kembali (1972)
- Romusha (1972)
- Samtidar (1972)
- Anjing-Anjing Geladak (1972)
- Desa di Kaki Bukit (1972)
- Hanya Satu Jalan (1972)
- Tjintaku Djauh Dipulau (1972)
- Lagu Untukmu (1973)
- Laki-Laki Pilihan (1973)
- Biang Kerok Beruntung (The Lucky Trouble Maker) (1973)
- Cukong Blo'on (1973)
- Si Mamad (1973)
- Jangan Biarkan Mereka Lapar (1974)
- Raja Jin Penjaga Pintu Kereta (1974)
- Buaye Gile (1974)
- Kasih Sayang (1974)*Laila Majenun (1975)
- Semalam di Malaysia (1975)
- Lonceng Maut (1976)
- Impian Perawan (Melati) (1976)
- Embun Pagi (1976)
- Perempuan Histeris (1976)
- Hippies Lokal (1976)
- Cinta Bersemi (1977)
- Saritem Penjual Jamu (1977)
- Mutiara (1977)
- Nafsu Besar Tenaga Kurang (1977)
- Guna-guna Istri Muda (1977)
- Seharum Hati Ibu (1977)
- Pembalasan si Pitung (Jiih) (1977)
- Jumpa di Persimpangan (1977)
- Melati Hitam (Rayuan Gombal) (1978)
- Godaan Siluman Perempuan (1978)
- Sopirku Sayang (1978)
- Rahasia Perkawinan (1978)
- Pembalasan Guna-Guna Istri Muda (1978)
- Zaman Edan (1978)
- Bulu-Bulu Cendrawasih (1978)
- Penangkal Ilmu Teluh (1979)
- Kabut Sutra Ungu (1979)
- Seindah Rembulan (1980)
- Darna Ajaib (1980)
- Permainan Bulan December (1980)
- Nostalgia di SMA (1980)
- Orang-Orang Sinting (1981)
- Perawan-perawan (1981)
- Manusia Berilmu Gaib (1981)
- Gondoruwo (1981)
- Jin Galunggung (1982)
- Mereka Memang Ada (1982)
- Bayi Ajaib (1982)
- Tante Garang (1983)
- Musang Berjanggut (1983)
- Secangkir Kopi Pahit (1984)
- Seandainya Aku Boleh Memilih (1984)
- Tari Kejang (1985)
- Gadis Hitam Putih (1985)
- Madu dan Racun (1985)
- Melintas Badai (1985)
- Pertarungan untuk Hidup (Tergoda Bibir Kenikmatan) (1986)
- Mandi Madu (1986)
- Takdir Marina (1986)
- Ketika Musim Semi Tiba (1986)
- Satu Mawar Tiga Duri (1986)
- Permainan yang Nakal (1986)
- Memburu Makelar Mayat (1986)
- Beri Aku Waktu (1986)
- Tinggal Sesaat Lagi (1986)
- Sama Juga Bohong (1986)
- Dewi Cinta (1986)
- Akibat Kanker Payudara (1987)
- Aku Benci Kamu (1987)
- Tirai Perkawinan / Bayangan Cinta (1987)
- Biarkan Aku Cemburu (1988)
- Pengakuan (1988)
- Catatan Si Doi (1988)
- Anak-anak Gass dalam Elegi Buat Nana (1988)
- Putri Kunti'anak (1988)
- Wanita Harimau (Santet II) (1989)
- Misteri dari Gunung Merapi (Penghuni Rumah Tua) (1989)
- Kemesraan (1989)
- Semua Sayang Kamu (1989)
- Ricky (Nakalnya Anak Muda) (1990)
- Ibuku Malang Ibu Tersayang (1990)
- Mutiara di Khatulistiwa (Di Hatiku Ada Kamu) (1990)
- Dorce Ketemu Jodoh (1990)
- Misteri dari Gunung Merapi II (Titisan Roh Nyai Kembang) (1990)
- Si Gondrong Lawan Bek Mardjuk (1990)
- Makhluk dari Kubur (1991)
- Yang Tercinta (1991)
- Zig Zag (Anak Jalanan) (1991)
- Plong (Naik Daun) (1991)
- Pelangi di Nusa Laut (1992)
- Godaan Perempuan Halus (1993)
- Kepuasan (1994)
- Gairah & Dosa (1995)
- Pocong 3 (2007)
- Sebelah Mata (2008)
- Fiksi. (2008)
- Kereta Hantu Manggarai (2008)
- Hantu Jamu Gendong (2009)
- Hari Untuk Amanda (2010)
- Alangkah Lucunya (Negeri Ini) (2010)
- Bayi Gaib: Bayi Tumbal Bayi Mati (2018)
- Ivanna (2022)

== Awards and nominations ==
Year	Award	Category	Work	Result
1976	Indonesian Film Festival	Citra Award for Best Leading Actress	Semalam di Malaysia	Won
1979	Indonesian Film Festival	Citra Award for Best Supporting Actress	Rahasia Perkawinan	Nominated
1982	Indonesian Film Festival	Citra Award for Best Supporting Actress	Gondoruwo	Nominated
1985	Indonesian Film Festival	Citra Award for Best Supporting Actress	Secangkir Kopi Pahit	Nominated
1986	Indonesian Film Festival	Citra Award for Best Supporting Actress	Beri Aku Waktu	Nominated
1988	Indonesian Film Festival	Citra Award for Best Supporting Actress	Akibat Kanker Payudara	Nominated
1991	Indonesian Film Festival	Citra Award for Best Supporting Actress	Zig-zag (Anak Jalanan)	Won

== Works cited ==
- "Filmografi Rina Hasyim" [Filmography for Rina Hasyim]. filmindonesia.or.id (in Indonesian). Konfiden Foundation. Archived from the original on 6 July 2022.
- "Penghargaan Rina Hasyim" [Awards for Rina Hasyim]. filmindonesia.or.id (in Indonesian). Konfiden Foundation. Archived from the original on 12 May 2015.
- "Rina Hasyim". filmindonesia.or.id (in Indonesian). Konfiden Foundation. Archived from the original on 3 February 2023.
- "Rina Hasyim" (in Indonesian). Taman Ismail Marzuki.
