= Chris Pattikawa =

Indonesian film director (1940–2020)

Christian Pattikawa (1 October 1940 – 1 January 2020) was an Indonesian film director and producer.

Pattikawa was born in Ambon. In 1974, he led the film company P.T. Aurea Aristo Film. Actress Rina Hassim was his wife. They had a two daughter, singer Jean Pattikawa (born 30 June 1970) and Yulia Pattikawa (born 1971). Chris was a contemporary of composer Enteng Tanamal and directors Nico Pelamonia and Jopijaya Burnama.

== Death ==
He died in Jakarta on 1 January 2020, at the age of 79. He was buried few days later at Pondok Ranggon Cemetery.

== Filmography ==
Jangan Biarkan Mereka Lapar - 1974 Kasih Sayang - 1974 Impian Perawan - 1976 Cinta Bersemi - 1977
