= Ca-bau-kan =

Ca-bau-kan 擦包看
- Directed by: Nia Dinata
- Written by: Nia Dinata
- Produced by: Nia Dinata
- Starring: Niniek L. Karim; Ferry Salim; Lola Amaria
- Cinematography: German G. Mintapradja
- Edited by: Sastha Sunu
- Music by: Andi Rianto
- Distributed by: Kalyana Shira Film
- Release date: 7 February 2002
- Running time: 120 minutes
- Country: Indonesia
- Language: Indonesian

Ca-bau-kan (Chinese: 擦包看), also known as The Courtesan, is a 2002 Indonesian historical romance film, directed by Nia Dinata, and starring Niniek L. Karim, Ferry Salim and Lola Amaria. It was distributed by Kalyana Shira Film and released on 7 February 2002 in Jakarta. The film was screened at the 2003 Palm Springs International Film Festival.

== Cast ==
- Ferry Salim as Tan Peng Liang
- Lola Amaria as Siti Noerhajati also known as Tinung
- Niniek L. Karim as Giok Lan
- Irgi A. Fahrenzi as Tan soen Bie
- Alex Komang as Rahardjo Soetardjo
- Robby Tumewu as Thio Boen Hiap
- Ananda George as Max Awuy
- Tutie Kirana as Jeng Tut
- Henky Solaiman as Liem Kiem Jang
- Lulu Dewayanti as Saodah
- Chossy Latu as Nyoo Tek Hong
- Alvin Adam as Timothy Wu
- Maria Oentoe as Tan Peng Liang's mother
- Billy Glenn as Tja Wan Sen
- Joseph Ginting as Oey Eng Goan
- Moelyono as Tan Peng Liang Tamim
- Yongki Komaladi as Kwee Tjwie Sien
