= Lola Amaria =

Indonesian actress and director (born 1977)

- Born: 30 July 1977; Jakarta, Indonesia
- Occupations: Actress; director; model; film producer
- Years active: 1997–present

Lola Amaria (born 30 July 1977) is an Indonesian actress, director, model, and film producer. She rose to prominence for participating in 1997 Wajah Femina, a modelling competition held by women's magazine Femina.

As a writer-director, Amaria made her feature film directorial debut with the drama film Betina (2006). She also directed and starred in Sunday Morning in Victoria Park (2010), which earned her a nomination for the Citra Award for Best Director. She won the Citra Award for Best Documentary Feature for directing The Exiles at the 2022 Indonesian Film Festival.

== Career ==
In 1997, she participated in a modelling competition held by women's magazine Femina, Wajah Femina. She won the award for Best National Costume during the competition. Then, she starred in Nan Achnas' soap opera Penari as Sila, an erotic dancer. In 2000, she made her film acting debut in Tabir, then starred in the leading role of Nia Dinata's Ca-bau-kan in 2001. In 2003, she made her producing debut in Aria Kusumadewa's Novel Tanpa Huruf 'R', which she also starred in.

In 2006, she made her directorial debut with drama film Betina, which won the NETPAC Award at the inaugural edition of Jogja-NETPAC Asian Film Festival. In 2010, she directed and starred in drama film Sunday Morning in Victoria Park about Indonesian migrant workers in Hong Kong. The film received seven nominations at the 2010 Indonesian Film Festival, including Best Director for Amaria. In 2012, she directed the segment "Lumba-Lumba" in LGBTQ anthology film Jakarta Deep Down. She served as a producer and starred in 2013 drama film Kisah 3 Titik, which tells the story of three labours named Titik. In 2014, she directed, wrote, and produced Negeri Tanpa Telinga, which earned her the Citra Award for Best Original Screenplay nomination at the 2014 Indonesian Film Festival. She directed drama films Jingga and Labuan Hati in 2016 and 2017, respectively. In 2018, Amaria co-directed Lima about Pancasila along with Shalahuddin Siregar, Tika Pramesti, Harvan Agustriansyah, and Adriyanto Dewo. In 2019, she directed a sports biopic film about competition climber Aries Susanti Rahayu, 6,9 Detik.

In 2022, she directed her debut documentary film The Exiles, which follows the stories of Indonesian students who are stranded and unable to return to Indonesia after the events of the 30 September Movement in 1965. It had its world premiere at the 17th Jogja-NETPAC Asian Film Festival and won the Indonesian Screen Award for Best Film. It won the Citra Award for Best Documentary Feature at the 2023 Indonesian Film Festival. In 2025, she made her acting return after eleven years in Hanung Bramantyo's Gowok: Javanese Kamasutra. It had its world premiere at the 54th International Film Festival Rotterdam, competing for Big Screen Competition.

== Filmography ==
Year	Title	Director	Writer	Producer	Actor	Role	Notes
2000	Tabir	No	No	No	Yes	Zaenab	
2001	Merdeka 17805	No	No	No	Yes	Aryati	
2001	Ca-bau-kan	No	No	No	Yes	Tinung	
2003	Novel Tanpa Huruf 'R'	No	No	Yes	Yes	Air Sunyi	
2006	Betina	Yes	No	Yes	No		
2010	Sunday Morning in Victoria Park	Yes	No	No	Yes	Mayang	
2012	Jakarta Deep Down	Yes	No	Yes	No		Segment: "Lumba-Lumba"
2013	Kisah 3 Titik	No	No	Yes	Yes	Titik Dewanti Sari	
2014	Negeri Tanpa Telinga	Yes	Yes	Yes	No		
2016	Jingga	Yes	Yes	Yes	No		
2017	Labuan Hati	Yes	No	Yes	No		
2018	Lima	Yes	No	Yes	No		
2019	6,9 Detik	Yes	No	Yes	No		
2022	The Exiles	Yes	Yes	Yes	No		
2025	Gowok: Javanese Kamasutra	No	No	No	Yes	Nyai Santi	
