= Niniek L. Karim =

Indonesian actress

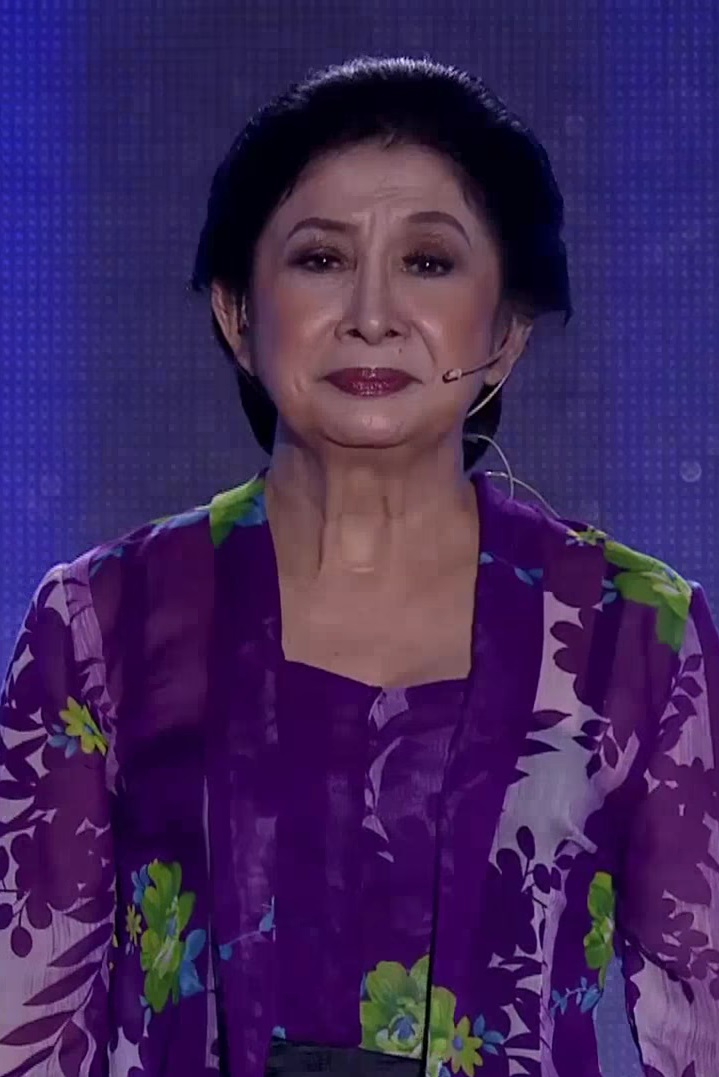
A portrait of Niniek L. Karim

Niniek L. Karim (born 14 January 1949) is an Indonesian actress who has won two Citra Awards for Best Supporting Actress.

== Biography ==
Karim was born in Mataram, West Nusa Tenggara, on 14 January 1949. Initially intending to be a teacher or journalist, after graduating from senior high school she instead enrolled at the psychiatry faculty of the University of Indonesia in Jakarta. She became interested in theatre whilst in Jakarta, and joined a campus troupe. In 1970, after a performance at Taman Ismail Marzuki, Teguh Karya asked her to join his theatre company, Teater Populer.

Although the theatre troupe had been active in film since 1971, Karim only made her feature film debut in 1985, with Karya's Ibunda. Owing to her previous experience in Karya's Teater Populer, she found that she did not need any special coaching for the film: she knew what the director expected. Her next film, Pacar Ketinggalan Kereta, was also directed by Karya. In it, Karima played a secretary named Retno who is assumed to be having an affair with the main character.

Karim only acted in two films during the 1990s. She instead spent much time acting in soap operas, such as Parmin (1994), Bayangan Cermin Palsu (1995), and Indonesia Berbisik (1995).

Karim returned to film in 2001, portraying Giok Lan in Nia Dinata's Ca Bau Kan. By 2008 Karim had become a lecturer on psychology at the University of Indonesia. She has also remained active on the stage, starring in such productions as Dara (Musa Widyatmodjo; 2008) and Kereta Kencana (Putu Wijaya; 2009). In 2010, a year in which she acted in three films, Karim was head of the Indonesian Film Festival. She resigned three days before the ceremony, saying "I have failed to make the FFI a warm house for the nation's artists and filmmakers".

As of August 2017, Karim has acted in 25 films. She has won two Citra Awards for Best Supporting Actress, one in 1986 for Ibunda, and the other in 1989 for Pacar Ketinggalan Kereta. She was unsuccessfully nominated for the same award in 2009 for Ketika Cinta Bertasbih 2; for her role in that film she received Best Supporting Actress at the 2010 Indonesian Movie Awards.

Karim has two children.

== Filmography ==
Source: (filmindonesia.or.id, Filmografi)

- Ibunda (1986)
- Pacar Ketinggalan Kereta (1988)
- Oom Pasikom (Parodi Ibukota) (1990)
- Sri (1997)
- Ca Bau Kan (2001)
- Garasi (2005)
- Ungu Violet (2005)
- Koper (2006)
- May (2008)
- Emak Ingin Naik Haji (2009)
- Ketika Cinta Bertasbih (2009)
- Ketika Cinta Bertasbih 2 (2009)
- Bahwa Cinta Itu Ada (2010)
- Red Cobex (2010)
- Dalam Mihrab Cinta (2010)
- Hasduk Berpola (2013)
- Hari Ini Pasti Menang (2013)
- Ketika Bung di Ende (2013)
- 12 Menit: Kemenangan untuk Selamanya (2014)
- Merry Riana: Mimpi Sejuta Dolar (2014)
- Ayah Menyayangi Tanpa Akhir (2015)
- Nay (2015)
- Musik untuk Cinta (2016)
- Barakati (2016)
- Sweet 20 (2017)
- Grave Torture (2024)

== Awards and nominations ==
Year	Award	Category	Recipients	Result
1986	Indonesian Film Festival	Citra Award for Best Supporting Actress	Ibunda	Won
1989	Indonesian Film Festival	Citra Award for Best Supporting Actress	Pacar Ketinggalan Kereta	Won
2009	Indonesian Film Festival	Citra Award for Best Supporting Actress	Ketika Cinta Bertasbih 2	Nominated
2017	Indonesian Film Festival	Citra Award for Best Supporting Actress	Sweet 20	Nominated

== Works cited ==
- Darsono, Budiono; Setia, Putu (18 November 1989). "Pacar Ketinggalan Citra" [Lover Without Standing] (in Indonesian). Archived from the original on 3 March 2016.
- "FFI committee chief resigns from post". The Jakarta Post. 6 December 2010.
- "Filmografi Niniek L. Karim" [Filmography for Niniek L. Karim]. filmindonesia.or.id (in Indonesian). Jakarta: Konfiden Foundation. Archived from the original on 1 February 2021.
- Junaidi, A. (5 March 2008). "Niniek L. Karim: Actress, lecturer and advocate of women's rights, 'green psychology'". The Jakarta Post. Archived from the original on 4 March 2022.
- Kurniasari, Triwik (8 November 2009). "Performances honor master's plays, poetry". The Jakarta Post.
- "Niniek L. Karim". filmindonesia.or.id (in Indonesian). Jakarta: Konfiden Foundation. Archived from the original on 1 February 2021.
- "Niniek L. Karim" (in Indonesian). Jakarta: Taman Ismail Marzuki.
- "Penghargaan Niniek L. Karim" [Awards for Niniek L. Karim]. filmindonesia.or.id (in Indonesian). Jakarta: Konfiden Foundation. Archived from the original on 27 August 2015.
- Ryanto, Tony (4 August 2001). "'Ca-bau-kan' to hit theater next year". The Jakarta Post.
- Said, Salim (9 August 1986). "Sebuah Festival yang Mudah Ditebak" [A Festival That's Easy to Guess]. Tempo (in Indonesian). Archived from the original on 4 March 2016.
- Soedarjo, Alvin Darlanika (20 April 2008). "'Dara' tells one woman's story in riveting fashion". The Jakarta Post.
