= Marlia Hardi =

Indonesian actress (1926–1984)

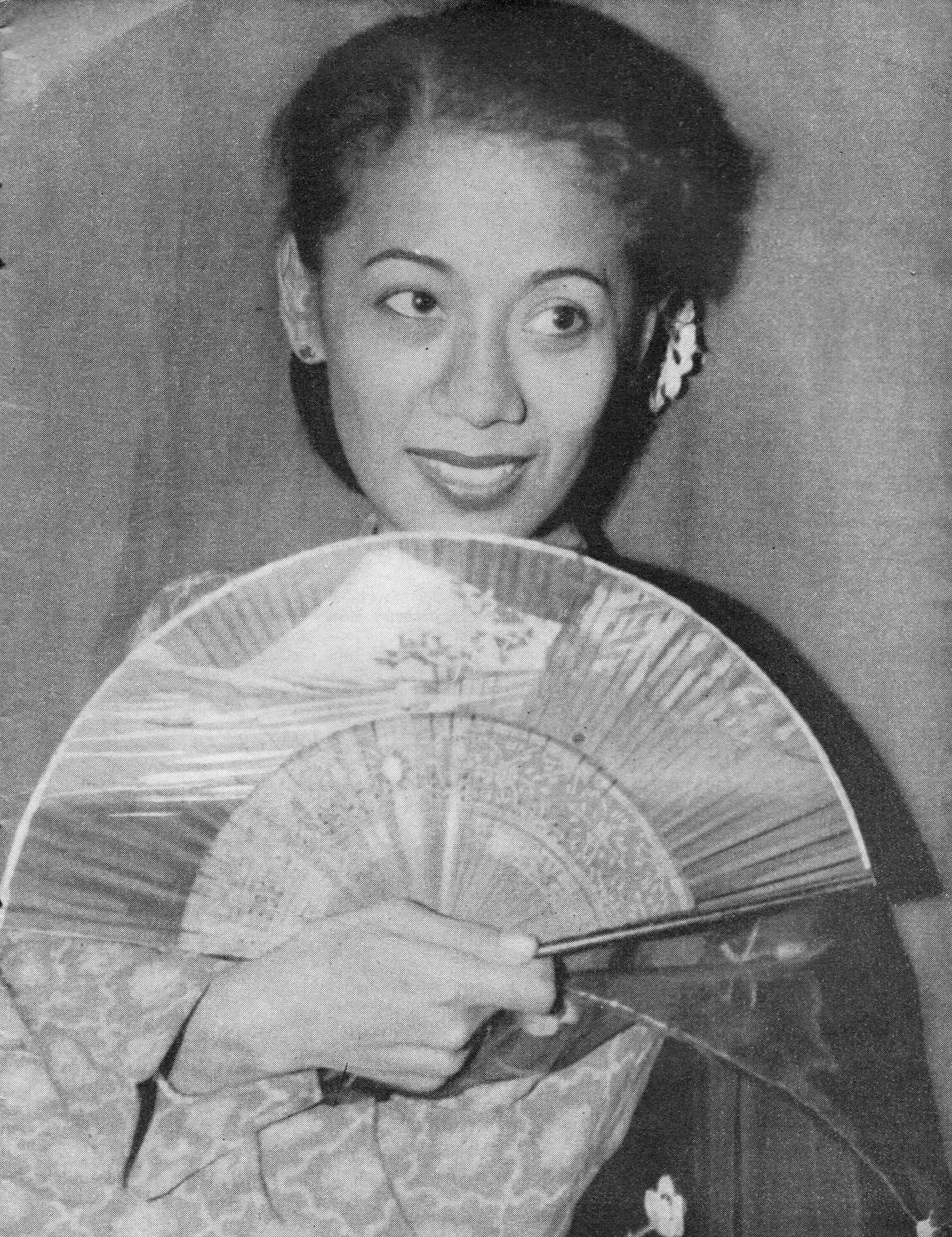
- Marlia Hardi, 1955
- Born: 10 March 1926; Magelang, Dutch East Indies
- Died: 18 June 1984 (aged 58); Jakarta, Indonesia
- Burial place: Karet Bivak Cemetery
- Occupation: Actress
- Years active: 1951–1983
- Spouse: Hardjo Samidi
- Children: 2

Marlia Hardi (10 March 1926 – 18 June 1984) was an Indonesian actress who was active from 1950s to 1980s. Born in the Magelang, she took to the stage in the 1940s before moving to Jakarta in 1949. Two years later she made her feature film debut in Untuk Sang Merah Putih. Over the next two decades she appeared in over seventy films, became recognized for her depictions of mothers, and received the Citra Award for Best Supporting Actress. Despite her productiveness, however, she sank into debt and committed suicide at the age of fifty-eight. She was the part of Classical Indonesian cinema.

== Biography ==
Marlia Hardi was born in Magelang, Central Java, on 10 March 1926. (Note: Though Abdhal (1955, p. 34) gives the year as 1925, Her grave marked her birth year as 1926.) She was of mixed Bugis and Javanese descent, through her father and mother, respectively. She received an elementary education at a Dutch-run school for indigenous Indonesians. By the 1940s she had become involved in the theatre, and married Hardjo Samidi. During the Indonesian National Revolution, while her husband was held by the returning Dutch colonial forces, Hardi eked out a living on her own.

In late 1949 Hardi and her husband moved to Jakarta. Two years later she made her feature film debut in a bit role in the Produksi Film Negara (PFN; State Film Corporation)'s Untuk Sang Merah Putih. The following year she took a starring role in another PFN film, Si Pintjang, portraying an old woman; as she was only twenty-four, she was artificially aged with make-up. That same year she appeared as the lead love interest in Selamat Berdjuang, Masku!, a Djakarta Film production. Hardi completed four other films in 1951.

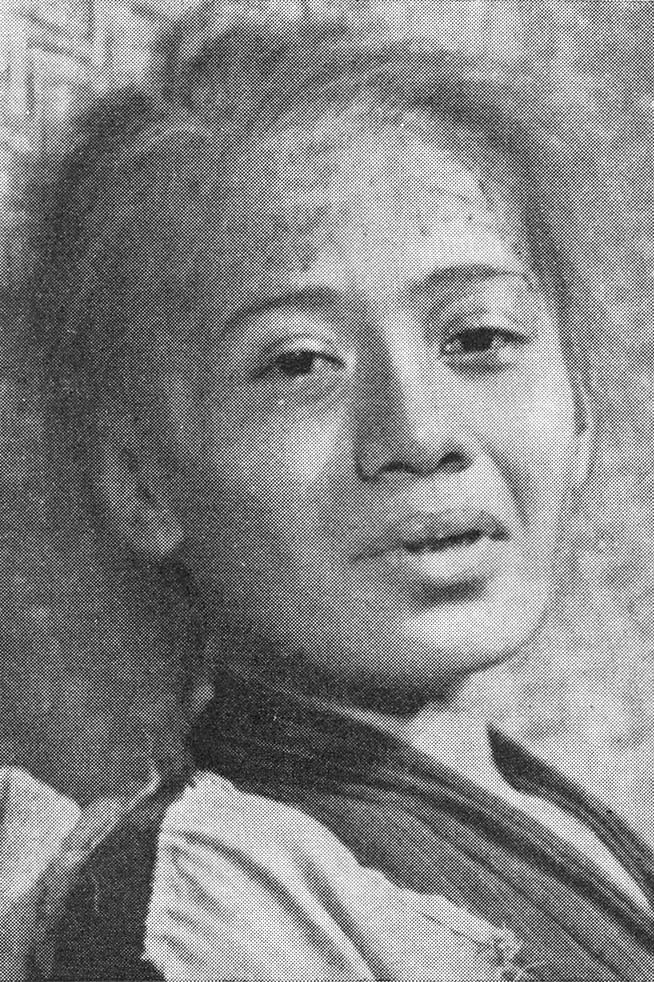
Hardi portraying an old woman in Si Pintjang

Over the next decade Hardi appeared in more than a dozen films, often in mother roles, for a number of companies, including Perfini's Terimalah Laguku (1952) and Tjambuk Api (1958), Gabungan Artis Film's Pulang (1952), Bintang Surabaja's Pelarian dari Pagar Besi (1951), and Kino Drama Atelier's Gadis Olahraga (1951). She also started a short-lived company, Budaya Film (literally 'Culture Film'), which had a single production: Uang Palsu (1955), directed by Hasan Basry R.M. By April 1955 she and Samidi, who was working as an employee of the censorship bureau, had two children: Hartati and Pradjono.

In the mid-1960s, despite the film industry stagnating in Indonesia's economic and political turmoils, Hardi remained active. She appeared in five films between 1964 and 1967, winning a Citra Award for Best Supporting Actress for her role in Petir Sepandjang Malam. During the 1970s and early 1980s she was mainly active in supporting roles – often as mother figures. She had also found success on television with the TVRI series Keluarga Marlia Hardi, which debuted in 1973 and continued until Hardi's death. On the show, she portrayed the wife of Awaludin, with a number of younger actors playing their children. The success of this programme led to numerous imitations.

Despite her popular success, however, Hardi was sinking into debt. On 18 June 1984, she was found dead in her Jakarta home, having hanged herself. In her suicide note, Hardi wrote that she had been driven to kill herself by her debts; she owed five million rupiah to her arisan group. In one letter, to fellow actor Ratno Timoer, she wrote that suicide "was the best road" for her. In another letter, to TVRI, she asked the company to take care of affairs related to her burial. In a column, the journalist-cum-actor Rachman Arge wrote that her death was all the more shocking owing to Hardi's frequent portrayal of strong, wise mothers, to whom millions of viewers could turn when they felt themselves lost in the bustle of modern life. Similar sentiments were expressed in an obituary in Tempo: "now we have all become orphans". (Note: Original: "Sekarang kita seperti menjadi yatim piatu.")

== Awards ==
Hardi won a Citra Award for Best Supporting Actress at the Indonesian Film Festival for her performance as Djafar's mother in Petir Sepandjang Malam in 1967. In 1981 she was nominated for a Citra Award for Best Supporting Actress for her role as Grandmother in Busana dalam Mimpi, but lost out to Mieke Wijaya of Kembang Semusim.

Award	Year	Category	Film	Result
Indonesian Film Festival	1967	Best Supporting Actress	Petir Sepandjang Malam	Won
Indonesian Film Festival	1981	Best Leading Actress	Busana dalam Mimpi	Nominated

== Filmography ==
During her more than two decades as an actress, Hardi appeared in some seventy-three roles.

- Musim Melati (1950)
- Gadis Olahraga (1951)
- Ditepi Bengawan Solo (1951)
- Kenangan Masa (1951)
- Si Pintjang (1951)
- Pelarian dari Pagar Besi (1951)
- Selamat Berdjuang, Masku! (1951)
- Pulang (1952)
- Siapa Dia (1952)
- Tenang Menanti (1952)
- Terimalah Laguku (1952)
- Ajati (1954)
- Melarat tapi Sehat (1954)
- Si Melati (1954)
- Dibalik Dinding (1955)
- Oh, Ibuku (1955)
- Sendja Indah (1957)
- Tjambuk Api (1958)
- Kalung Mutiara (1960)
- Si Kembar (1961)
- Anak-anak Revolusi (1964)
- Minah Gadis Dusun (1966)
- Petir Sepandjang Malam (1967)
- Mahkota (1967)
- Piso Komando (1967)
- Tuan Tanah Kedawung (1970)
- Lampu Merah (1971)
- Hostess Anita (Sendja Selalu Mendatang) (1971)
- Pendekar Sumur Tudjuh (1971)
- Tanah Gersang (1971)
- Kabut di Kintamani (1972)
- Sisa-sisa Laskar Pajang (1972)
- Cukong Blo'on (1973)
- Tabah Sampai Akhir (1973)
- Batas Impian (1974)
- Dikejar Dosa (1974)
- Calon Sarjana (1974)
- Kehormatan (1974)
- Hamidah (1974)
- Senyum dan Tangis (1974)
- Tangisan Ibu Tiri (1974)
- Cinta Abadi (Menara Gading) (1976)
- Anak Emas (1976)
- Cintaku Tergadai (1977)
- Gara-gara Isteri Muda (1977)
- Gaun Hitam (1977)
- Duo Kribo (1977)
- Raja Dangdut (1978)
- Zaman Edan (1978)
- Puspa Indah Taman Hati (1979)
- Kau dan Aku Sayang (You and I My Love) (1979)
- Cubit-cubitan (1979)
- Si Ayub dari Teluk Naga (1979)
- Kerinduan (1979)
- Milikku (1979)
- Camelia (1979)
- Aduhai Manisnya (1980)
- Kembang Semusim (1980)
- Anak-anak Tak Beribu (1980)
- Busana dalam Mimpi (1980)
- Kembang Padang Kelabu (1980)
- Begadang Karena Penasaran (1980)
- Seputih Hatinya Semerah Bibirnya (1980)
- Irama Cinta (1980)
- Aladin dan Lampu Wasiat (1980)
- Merenda Hari Esok (1981)
- Lima Sahabat (1981)
- Para Perintis Kemerdekaan (1981)
- Orang-Orang Sinting (1981)
- Intan Mendulang Cinta (1981)
- Bukan Impian Semusim (1981)
- Sundel Bolong (1981)
- Kereta Api Terakhir (1981)
- Titian Serambut Dibelah Tujuh (1982)
- Buaya Putih (1982)
- Mendung Tak Selamanya Kelabu (1982)
- Anakku Terlibat (1983)

== Works cited ==
- Abdhal (April 1955). "Marlia Hardy". Film Varia (in Indonesian). 2 (4): 34–36.
- Arge, Rahman (2008). Permainan Kekuasaan: 200 Kolom Pilihan [Power Games: 200 Choice Columns]. Jakarta: Kompas. ISBN 978-979-709-379-2.
- Biran, Misbach Yusa, ed. (1979). Apa Siapa Orang Film Indonesia 1926–1978 [What and Who: Film Figures in Indonesia, 1926–1978]. Jakarta: Sinematek Indonesia. OCLC 6655859.
- Kristanto, JB, ed. (2007). Katalog Film Indonesia 1926– 2007. Jakarta: Nalar. ISBN 978-979-26-9006-4.
- "Marlia Hardi – Filmografi" [Marlia Hardi – Filmography]. filmindonesia.or.id (in Indonesian). Jakarta: Konfiden Foundation. Archived from the original on 8 April 2016.
- "Marlia Hardi – Penghargaan" [Marlia Hardi – Awards]. filmindonesia.or.id (in Indonesian). Konfiden Foundation. Archived from the original on 14 July 2015.
- "Meninggal Dunia Bu Mar, Bukan Sandiwara" [Death of Bu Mar: No Act]. Tempo (in Indonesian): 69. 23 June 1984.
- "Peristiwa 15 Hari Film dan Drama" [15 Days of Events in Film and Theatre]. Kentjana (in Indonesian). 2 (24): 18–19. 1 August 1955.
- "Perkembangan Film Indonesia Selama Seperempat Abad (IV)" [Developments in Indonesian Cinema Over a Quarter Century (IV)]. Film Varia (in Indonesian). 1 (6): 18–19, 34–36. May 1954.
- Yayasan Untuk Indonesia, ed. (2005). "Marlia Hardi". Ensiklopedi Jakarta (in Indonesian). Vol. 2. Jakarta: Department of Culture and Museums, Provincial Government of the Jakarta Capital Region. pp. 258–259. ISBN 978-979-8682-51-3.
