= Adriyanto Dewo =

Indonesian filmmaker (born 1983)

- Born: Adriyanto Waskito Dewo; 13 December 1983; Jakarta, Indonesia
- Occupations: Director; screenwriter
- Years active: 2008–present

Adriyanto Dewo (born 13 December 1983) is an Indonesian filmmaker. His directorial debut Tabula Rasa earned him a Citra Award for Best Director at the 2014 Indonesian Film Festival.

== Career ==
Dewo graduated from Institut Kesenian Jakarta in 2008, majoring in film. His graduation film The Storyteller stars Sujiwo Tejo and Titi Rajo Bintang. In 2010, he directed a short film Song of the Silent Heroes about Indonesian migrant workers in Hong Kong, starring Rajo Bintang and Lola Amaria. In 2012, he directed the segment "Waiting for Colors" in LGBTQ anthology film Jakarta Deep Down. It won the Best Short Film at the 3rd Hanoi International Film Festival.

His feature-length directorial debut film Tabula Rasa was released in 2014. It received four awards at the 2014 Indonesian Film Festival, including Best Director for Dewo. He directed drama film Homecoming, which had its world premiere at the 2019 International Film Festival and Awards Macao. He received a Citra Award for Best Original Screenplay at the 2020 Indonesian Film Festival. In 2021, he directed romantic drama film One Night Stand, which stars Jourdy Pranata and Putri Marino.

He directed Galang which had its world premiere at the 2022 Jakarta Film Week, inspired by the 2008 Bandung stampede. In 2023, he directed two feature films: romantic drama Guide to Prepare for Separation and horror Kajiman. In 2024, he directed Goodbye, Farewell, which had its world premiere as the opening film of Jakarta Film Week.

== Filmography ==
Film

Year	Title	Director	Writer	Notes
2008	The Storyteller	Yes	Yes	Short film
2010	Song of the Silent Heroes	Yes	Yes	Short film
2012	Hi5teria	Yes	No	Segment: "Pasar Setan"
2012	Jakarta Deep Down	Yes	No	Segment: "Waiting for Colors"
2014	Tabula Rasa	Yes	No	Feature film directorial debut
2015	Heaven Is Not a Place	Yes	Yes	Short film
2018	Lima	Yes	No	Anthology film
2019	Homecoming	Yes	Yes	
2021	One Night Stand	Yes	Yes	
2022	Galang	Yes	No	
2023	Guide to Prepare for Separation	Yes	Yes	
2023	Kajiman	Yes	Yes	
2024	Goodbye, Farewell	Yes	Yes	
