= Crocodile Tears (film) =

2024 thriller film

- Indonesian: Air Mata Buaya
- Directed by: Tumpal Tampubolon
- Written by: Tumpal Tampubolon
- Produced by: Mandy Marahimin; Anthony Chen; Claire Lajoumard; Yi Peng Teoh; Christophe Lafont; Harry Flöter; Jörg Siepmann
- Starring: Yusuf Mahardika; Zulfa Maharani; Marissa Anita
- Cinematography: Teck Siang Lim
- Edited by: Jasmine Ng Kin Kia; Kelvin Nugroho
- Music by: Kin Leonn
- Production companies: Talamedia; Acrobates Films; Giraffe Pictures; Poetik Film; 2Pilots Filmproduction
- Release date: 9 September 2024 (TIFF)
- Running time: 98 minutes
- Countries: Indonesia; France; Singapore; Germany
- Language: Indonesian

Crocodile Tears (Indonesian: Air Mata Buaya) is a 2024 coming-of-age thriller film directed and written by Tumpal Tampubolon in his directorial debut. It stars Yusuf Mahardika, Zulfa Maharani, and Marissa Anita.

The film had its world premiere at the 2024 Toronto International Film Festival on 9 September 2024. It received five nominations at the 2024 Indonesian Film Festival, including Best Picture.

== Plot ==
Johan lives alone with his mother on a crocodile farm in West Java. Among the alligators and crocodiles they raise, one white crocodile holds a sacred place in his mother’s heart. She believes she can talk to it and that it will make romantic bonds last forever. Day in and day out, Johan runs the ticket booth, cleans the grounds, and feeds the reptiles.

One day, while handing out promotional flyers near a local vocational high school, Johan crosses paths with Arumi, a young woman who claims to work as a merchant. He invites her to check out the show at the crocodile farm, and before long, the two hit it off and start spending a lot of time together. While hanging out with Arumi's friends, one of them brings up a chilling rumor: that the owner of the crocodile farm murdered her husband and fed his body to the beasts. Overcome with guilt, Arumi confesses that she isn't actually a merchant—she works as a hostess at a karaoke bar. The two end up sleeping together.

Late one night, Johan finds his mother kneeling before the crocodile enclosure, only for her to suddenly snap and attack him. Fortunately, Johan manages to snap her out of it, but her behavior grows increasingly erratic. On another night, Johan stumbles upon blood dripping all over the floor and catches his mother with her mouth drenched in blood right in front of the enclosure.

Meanwhile, Arumi gets fired from her job after refusing to serve a customer. Shortly after, she discovers she is pregnant. Johan’s mother, who took a dislike to Arumi from the very beginning, doubts that Johan is the father. But Johan, madly in love, insists on marrying Arumi—desperate to avoid spending the rest of his life alone. They tie the knot, and Arumi moves in to help run the farm. As time goes on, Arumi realizes a disturbing truth: Johan's mother has been treating the white crocodile as her late husband. Horrified, Arumi tries to pack her bags and leave, but Johan manages to convince her to stay.

One day, Johan’s mother spikes their drinks with sleeping pills and drags a unconscious Arumi toward the crocodile pit. As the drugs wear off, a dazed Johan crawls across the floor, spotting a baby crocodile along the way. Dragging himself to the pit, he desperately tries to stop his mother from throwing Arumi to the crocs. Screaming at the reptiles, his mother tells Johan she regrets ever giving birth to him, before throwing herself into the pit.

Following her death, two white crocodiles now inhabit the enclosure. In the end, Johan and Arumi drive away into the distance, staring blankly ahead.

== Cast ==
- Yusuf Mahardika as Johan
- Zulfa Maharani as Arumi
- Marissa Anita as Mama
- Sapta Taliwang as Karaoke Man

== Production ==
The idea for Crocodile Tears was conceived in 2018, beginning with its participation at the Southeast Asian Fiction Film Lab. The project was selected to participate at the 2019 TorinoFilmLab and La Fabrique Cinéma de l'Institut français. In 2020, Marahimin and Tampubolon presented the project at the Berlinale Talents Project Market.

In March 2024, it was announced that Cercamon acquired the film's worldwide rights.

== Release ==
Crocodile Tears had its world premiere at the 2024 Toronto International Film Festival on 9 September 2024 during the Centrepiece program. It had its Asian premiere at the 29th Busan International Film Festival during A Window on Asian Cinema section. It competed for the Sutherland Trophy at the 2024 BFI London Film Festival.

The film was released in Indonesian theatres on 7 May 2026.

== Accolades ==
Award / Film Festival	Date of ceremony	Category	Recipient(s)	Result	Ref.
BFI London Film Festival	20 October 2024	Sutherland Trophy	Tumpal Tampubolon	Nominated	
Indonesian Film Festival	20 November 2024	Best Picture	Mandy Marahimin	Nominated	
Indonesian Film Festival	20 November 2024	Best Director	Tumpal Tampubolon	Nominated	
Indonesian Film Festival	20 November 2024	Best Actress	Marissa Anita	Nominated	
Indonesian Film Festival	20 November 2024	Best Supporting Actress	Zulfa Maharani	Nominated	
Indonesian Film Festival	20 November 2024	Best Original Screenplay	Tumpal Tampubolon	Nominated	
Film Pilihan Tempo	5 February 2025	Film Pilihan Tempo	Crocodile Tears	Nominated	
Film Pilihan Tempo	5 February 2025	Best Director	Tumpal Tampubolon	Nominated	
Jakarta Film Week	26 October 2025	Direction Award	Tumpal Tampubolon	Won	
Jakarta Film Week	26 October 2025	Nongshim Award for Feature Film	Tumpal Tampubolon	Won	
Festival Film Bandung	22 August 2026	Highly Commended Leading Actor	Yusuf Mahardika	Pending	
Festival Film Bandung	22 August 2026	Highly Commended Leading Actress	Marissa Anita	Pending	
