= Affair (film) =

- Film poster
- Directed by: Nayato Fio Nuala
- Written by: Viva Westi
- Produced by: Chand Parvez Servia
- Starring: Sigi Wimala; Dimas Aditya; Garnetta Haruni; Monique Henri
- Cinematography: Freddy A. Lingga
- Edited by: Tiara Puspa Rani
- Music by: Dion Subiakto & Eka Sitorus
- Production company: Starvision Plus
- Distributed by: Starvision Plus
- Release date: March 11, 2010
- Running time: 83 minutes
- Country: Indonesia
- Language: Indonesian
- Budget: -

Affair is a 2010 Indonesian horror slasher feature film, written by Viva Westi and directed by Nayato Fio Nuala. It stars Sigi Wimala, Dimas Aditya, Garneta Haruni, and Monique Henry. The film was released on March 11, 2010, and is a Starvision Plus production. Affair is the first indonesian feature film to be released on Blu-Ray by Starvision Plus.

== Plot ==
Childhood best girlfriends Reta (Sigi Wimala) and Santi (Garnetta Haruni) are reunited again in college. Reta immediately falls in love with Daniel (Dimas Aditya), Santi's boyfriend. Knowing this, Santi conceals her relationship with Daniel. Santi finds out that Reta has a brain tumor and is told she only has 3 months to live. Santi wants to make Reta happy during the final moments of her life, and convinces Daniel to approach Reta. Daniel initially refuses but due to Santy's insisting, he finally agrees. Still, jealousy and hurt builds up every time Santi sees Daniel together with Reta. Time passes by, Reta and Daniel celebrate their first anniversary together while Santi becomes agitated because Reta looks ever more healthy. Santi asks Daniel to tell Reta the truth during Daniel's birthday celebration, that Santi is pregnant with Daniel's child. They do not realize that Reta hears what they were saying. So when Reta meets Santi, she announces that Daniel has proposed to her and will marry her because she is also pregnant with Daniel's child. Apparently Reta lied about her illness, and it was just a trick. After hearing that, Santi goes crazy and kills Reta, mutilating her and storing Reta's chopped up body in a suitcase. Daniel regrets what Santi has done, but helps Santi to dispose of the body. On the way, an accident occurs and Daniel dies. Rita walks off with the suitcase of bodyparts.
