= Ibunda =

- Poster
- Directed by: Teguh Karya
- Written by: Teguh Karya
- Produced by: Sudwikatmono; R. Sunarso
- Starring: Tuti Indra Malaon; Alex Komang; Ayu Azhari; Niniek L. Karim; Ria Irawan; Galeb Husein
- Cinematography: George Kamarullah
- Edited by: B. Benny MS
- Music by: Idris Sardi
- Production companies: Satrya Perkasa Esthetika Film; Suptan Film
- Release date: 1986
- Running time: 103 minutes
- Country: Indonesia
- Language: Indonesian

Ibunda (Mother) is a 1986 Indonesian film directed by Teguh Karya. Telling of a family's struggles in Jakarta, it set a new record at the 1986 Indonesian Film Festival when it won nine Citra Awards.

== Plot ==
The ethnic Javanese family headed by Rakhim (Tuti Indra Malaon) is living in Jakarta and trying to make a living. Rakhim, a widow, is raising her youngest daughter, Fitri (Ria Irawan) with the help of her second child. Her eldest, Farida (Niniek L. Karim), has married the nouveau riche Gatot (Galeb Husin). Meanwhile, the third child, Zulfikar (Alex Komang), has become an actor.

Two issues arise at roughly the same time. Zulfikar has left his wife (Ayu Azhari) and young child for a cougar with whom he is sleeping to further his career. Meanwhile, Farida berates Fitri for her choice of boyfriend; her boyfriend, Luke, is Papuan, and Farida fears that their family's bloodline will be tainted. In response, Fitri runs away from home.

Zulfikar is filming a movie about a family torn apart by war, is visited by his mother, who tells him that his absence is tearing his family apart. Driven to guilt through his experience with the film, Zulfikar breaks off his relationship with his sponsor, leaving her in tears, and returns to his wife. Meanwhile, Rakhim tells Farida and Gatot that any family is mixed, due to bringing in people from outside the family, and that ethnicity does not matter. Fitri returns home after hiding at her sister-in-law's house. The entire family – including Luke – gathers for breakfast and a photograph.

== Production ==
Ibunda was funded by the Subentra Group, headed by Sudwikatmono. According to Sudwikatmono, the group funded the production of five films simultaneously, each directed by different people. Teguh Karya was selected to direct Ibunda, which he had also written, while the other four were handled by young directors. The film was produced by Satrya Perkasa Esthetika Film and Suptan Film.

Niniek L. Karim, who was cast as Farida, had a background in theatre. She reported that she did not receive any special coaching for the film, as she knew what Karya expected.

== Style ==
Salim Said, writing for Tempo magazine, wrote that Ibunda was presented evenly and with realistic dialogue, as opposed to the more bombastic stories common at the time, which often featured dialogue which "could only be found in works of propaganda". (Note: Original: "... yang hanya mungkin ditemukan dalam sandiwara propaganda, ...") Ibunda showed a film within a film, which Said wrote harkened back to the 1981 film The French Lieutenant's Woman. The depictions of the characters are in accordance with the mannerisms of the Javanese middle class, without mixing Western acting styles.

== Themes ==
Said noted the portrayal of a happy family in Ibunda was striking, especially considering Karya's films generally showed that family meant disaster. A write-up by Monash University notes that another theme is racial prejudice, as shown by the discrimination against Luke because of his ethnicity.

== Release and reception ==
Ibunda was released in 1986. It did not turn a profit, a situation the Subentra Group blamed on imported Hollywood films being more popular. Sudwikatmono described Ibunda as the best of the five films they had funded at the time. In his review, Said wrote that, although the film within a film and scenes with were illogical, it may not be too much to call Ibunda "Teguh Karya's best work yet." (Note: Original: "... tidak berlebihan untuk menyebut Ibunda karya terbaik Teguh hingga saat ini.")

Ibunda received nine Citra Awards at the 1986 Indonesian Film Festival, out of 13 total categories, winning Best Film, Best Director, Best Actress (Niniek L. Karim), Best Supporting Actress, Best Music, Best Sound Editing, Best Editing, Best Cinematography, and Best Original Screenplay. This was a new record at the festival, surpassing Wim Umboh's 1972 film Perkawinan (Marriage), which won eight. At the 1987 Asia-Pacific Film Festival in Taipei, the film won a special award for intercultural exchange.

Ibunda has been licensed internationally to Between Three Worlds Video; the company has released the film on VHS, with English subtitles by the Australian company SBS Television.
