= Tuti Indra Malaon =

Indonesian actress, dancer, and lecturer

- Malaon in a promotional shot from Ibunda
- Born: Pudjiastuti Suratno; 1 December 1939; Batavia, Dutch East Indies
- Died: 20 September 1989 (aged 49); Jakarta, Indonesia
- Citizenship: Indonesian
- Occupations: Actress, dancer, lecturer
- Years active: 1960s–1989
- Notable work: Wadjah Seorang Laki-laki; Ibunda; Pacar Ketinggalan Kereta
- Awards: 2 Citra Awards

Tuti Indra Malaon (1 December 1939 – 20 September 1989), born Pudjiastuti Suratno, was an Indonesian actress, dancer, and lecturer.

== Early life ==
Malaon was born with the name Pudjiastuti Suratno on 1 December 1939 to Suratno Sastroamidjojo, a Javanese civil servant, and his wife. She was the sixth of ten children born to the couple. At the age of three, she became interested in dancing after watching traditional gamelan and dance performances at the home of a family friend. As her father was restationed, the family often moved around Java. On 17 August 1950, during Independence Day celebrations, she performed for President Sukarno at the presidential palace; she was also a cultural ambassador to Japan, China, and the Soviet Union. She was enrolled in a dance school, but later dropped out.

In 1959, Malaon began her studies at the English Literature program of the University of Indonesia, paying her way by working at an insurance agency. She also became involved with theatre, receiving her first role in a play by Utuy Tatang Sontani. She graduated in 1965, having married Indra Malaon during her studies. That year she joined Teguh Karya's Popular Theatre, and in 1966 had her first child, Meike. She became a lecturer on drama at the university in 1968, having taken the time to study African American and absurd theatre. Also, in 1968 she had her second child, Reita.

== Film career ==
Malaon made her feature-film debut in Teguh Karya's 1971 work Wadjah Seorang Laki-laki (Ballad of a Man). In 1973 she had her third child, Ridha, and appeared in Kawin Lari (Elope). This was followed by Perkawinan Semusim (A Season's Marriage) three years later. In 1979 she was diagnosed with Hepatitis B. In 1982 she appeared in Neraca Kasih (Love's Scale).

Maloan's husband died after being struck by a bus in October 1985; at the time he was head judge of the Bogor city court. The following year, Maloan starred in Karya's 1986 film Ibunda (Mother), as the mother. For this role she won her first Citra Award for Best Leading Actress at the 1986 Indonesian Film Festival. This was followed by Cintaku di Rumah Susun (My Love at the House) in 1987. That October she was chosen as a member of the People's Consultative Assembly, representing artists and creative workers. She was only told of her appointment two weeks before her inauguration.

Malaon received treatment for internal bleeding resulting from liver troubles in January 1989, from which she seemingly recovered fully. However, on 15 September 1989, she was checked into Dr. Mintohardjo Hospital in Bendungan Hilir, Tanah Abang, once again for internal bleeding, and died five days later. At the time of her death, she was working for Matra magazine and ran Piranti Esa Nusa, a public relations firm, out of her home. She was buried in Karet Bivak Cemetery, beside her husband.

Maloan's last film, Pacar Ketinggalan Kereta (Lover Left by the Train), which had begun production in 1988, was released that October. For her work, she posthumously received a Citra Award for Best Leading Actress. Her position at the People's Consultative Assembly was filled by Rae Sita Supit in August 1991. At the 2010 Indonesian Film Festival she received a lifetime achievement award for her acting.
