= Oscar Motuloh =

Indonesian journalist

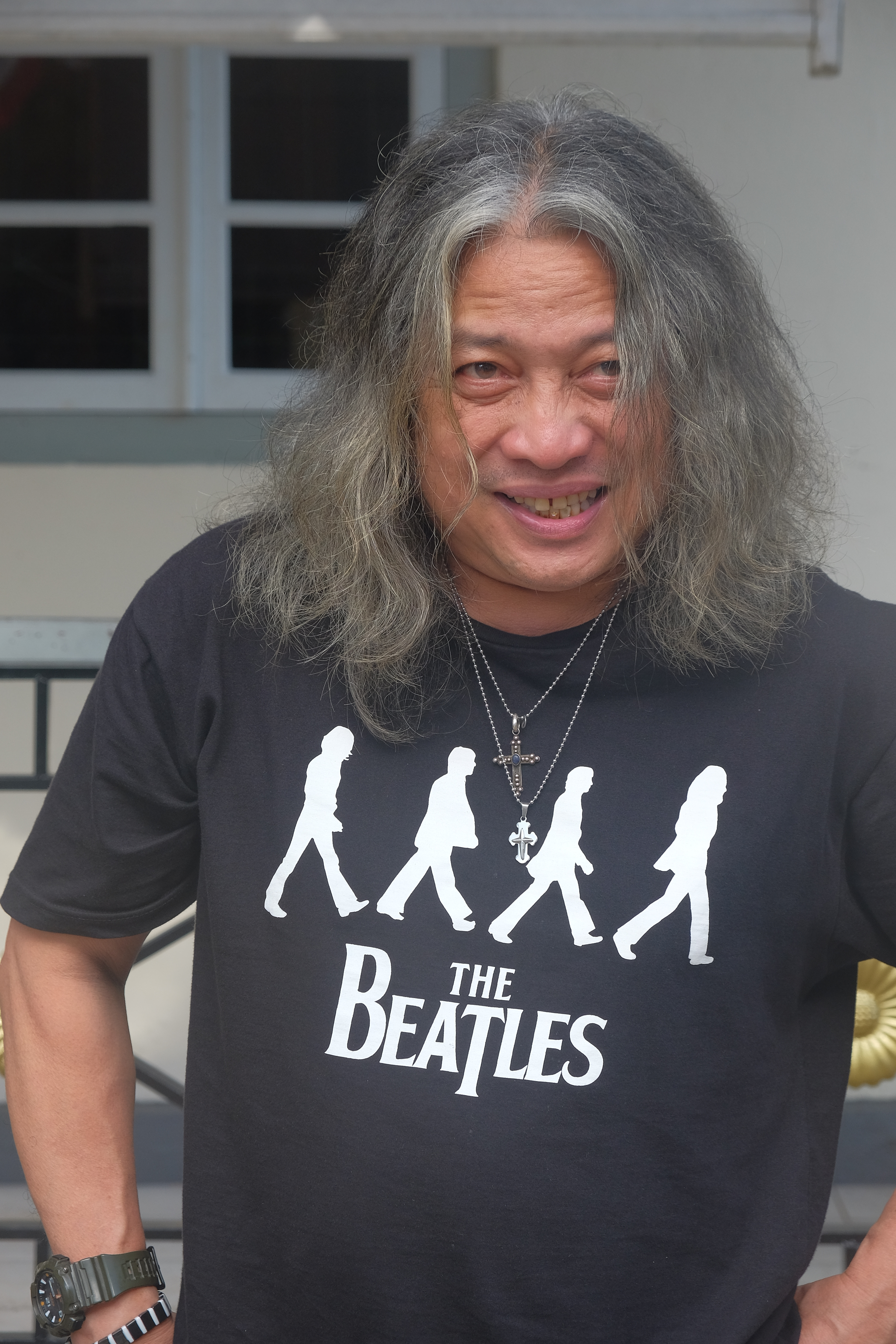
- Born: 17 August 1959 (age 65); Surabaya, Jawa Timur, Indonesia

Oscar Motuloh was born on 17 August 1959 in Surabaya, East Java. He started his journalism career as a reporter at Antara (Indonesian News Agency) in 1988. Two years later he was assigned to the Press Photo Division and directed that division (1990-2009). He teaches photojournalism across Indonesia. On 18 September 2019, He was awarded Empu Ageng (equivalent to Doctor Honoris Causa) from Indonesia Institute of The Arts, Yogyakarta.
