= Tumpal Tampubolon =

Indonesian film director (born 1979)

- Born: 12 December 1979 (age 46); Tarakan, North Kalimantan, Indonesia
- Education: Bandung Institute of Technology
- Occupations: Director; screenwriter
- Years active: 2005–present

Tumpal Tampubolon (born 12 December 1979) is an Indonesian film director, screenwriter, and actor. His feature-length directorial debut, Crocodile Tears, had its world premiere at the 2024 Toronto International Film Festival.

== Career ==
In 2005, Tampubolon received the award Script Development Competition for Best Short Fiction at the Jakarta International Film Festival for his first screenplay, The Last Believer. He participated in Berlinale Talent Campus in 2009. In 2010, he wrote and directed the segment "Mamalia" for the anthology film Belkibolang. A year later, he wrote and directed a short film Soleram. In 2012, he wrote his first feature film Pasukan Kapiten, directed by Rudy Soedjarwo. A year later, he wrote and starred in Anggun Priambodo's Rocket Rain. In 2014, he won the Citra Award for Best Original Screenplay for writing Tabula Rasa. In 2018, he co-wrote action-comedy film 212 Warrior with Seno Gumira Ajidarma and Sheila Timothy.

In 2021, his short film The Sea Calls for Me won the Sonje Award at the 26th Busan International Film Festival. It also won the Best Live Action Short Film at the 2021 Indonesian Film Festival. His feature-length directorial debut, psychological thriller film Crocodile Tears, had its world premiere at the 2024 Toronto International Film Festival.

== Filmography ==
Film

Year	Title	Director	Writer	Notes
2006	The Last Believer	Yes	Yes	Short film
2008	Drum Lesson	Yes	Yes	Short film
2010	Belkibolang	Yes	No	Segment: "Mamalia"
2011	Soleram	Yes	Yes	Short film
2012	Pasukan Kapiten	No	Yes	
2013	Rocket Rain	No	Yes	
2014	Tabula Rasa	No	Yes	
2015	Rumah	No	Yes	Short film
2018	212 Warrior	No	Yes	
2021	The Sea Calls for Me	Yes	Yes	Short film
2022	Galang	No	Yes	
2023	Suzzanna: Kliwon Friday Night	No	Yes	
2024	Crocodile Tears	Yes	Yes	Feature directorial debut film
2026	Sleep No More	No	Co-writer	

Television

Year	Title	Director	Writer	Network	Notes
2021	Detektif Soleh	No	Yes	Mola	4 episodes
2021	Angkringan	No	Yes	Mola	6 episodes
2022	Piknik Pesona	Yes	Yes	Vision+	Episode: "Small Talk"
2023	The Talent Agency	No	Yes	Disney+ Hotstar	Episode: "Pandji and Soleh"

Radio drama

Year	Title	Director	Writer	Network	Notes
2021	Mau Gak Mau	Yes	Yes	Rapot	4 episodes

=== As actor ===
Film

Year	Title	Role	Director	Notes
2012	Hi5teria	Irul	Nicho Yudifar	Segment: "Palasik"
2013	Rocket Rain	Jansen	Anggun Priambodo	
2017	Marlina the Murderer in Four Acts	Marlina's deceased husband	Mouly Surya	
2024	Borderless Fog	Juwing	Edwin	

Television

Year	Title	Role	Notes
2021	Angkringan	Moko	Episode: "Campur Aduk STMJ"
