= 24 (2021 film) =

2021 Singaporean film

- Promotional poster
- Directed by: Royston Tan
- Written by: Royston Tan
- Produced by: Jun Chong; Karen Khoo
- Starring: James Choong
- Cinematography: Juan Qi An
- Edited by: Jun Chong
- Production company: Chuan Pictures
- Release date: 10 October 2021 (Busan)
- Running time: 77 minutes
- Country: Singapore
- Languages: English; Malay; Bengali; Mandarin

24 is a 2021 Singaporean art house film directed by Royston Tan, starring James Choong.

== Cast ==
- James Choong as the sound engineer
- Xiao Li Yuan as Zhang Xiao Wu
- Royston Tan as himself

== Release ==
The film premiered at the Busan International Film Festival on 10 October 2021.

== Reception ==
John Berra of Screen Daily wrote that the film "is utterly delightful on a scene-by-scene basis as characters are vividly sketched through glimpses of life, work, and artistic pursuits."

Morris Yang of the International Cinephile Society rated the film 4 stars out of 5, writing that the film "is filled with the graceful celebration of life precisely by representing it through the spaces it evokes, common or unique, sanctioned or underground".
