= 2008 Bandung stampede =

Crowd crush in Bandung, Indonesia

2008 Bandung Human Stampede, known as Tragedi AACC (AACC Tragedy) or Sabtu Kelabu (Dark Saturday), was a stampede and mass hysteria that occurred on 9 February 2008 at Asia African Cultural Center or AACC building (now called De Majestic) in Bandung, Indonesia.

== Background ==
Bandung metal band Beside was holding a concert of their first album launch entitled Against Ourselves at AACC building. The concert started at 19:00 (local time). According to many sources, the building where the concert took place was capable of accommodating 500 people.

== Incident ==
The number of people attending the concert exceeded the capacity of the building where the concert was taking place. There were an estimated 800 to 1000 people watching the concert. Apart from those in the building, there were others who were outside the building. When the concert concluded at 20:30, the panic started as the audience was leaving the building. As the building was unable to safely accommodate so many people, the air circulation was greatly decreased and attendees suffered from asphyxiation, suffocation, dehydration and jostling. The lack of medical staff meant that the impacted attendees received no proper medical attention. It was reported that there were a number of people lying on the floor who did not receive medical attention at all.

== Aftermath ==
This incident claimed eleven lives and left dozens of attendees injured. Three people were arrested and declared as suspects with charges of negligent homicide. Among the fatalities, there was one female victim.

The AACC building was temporarily closed due to the incident. In 2010, it was renovated and renamed to New Majestic. Changes to the management once again saw renaming of the building to De Majestic in 2017. The building now hosts traditional art shows and other events.

== Memorial ==
In 2014, a monument of memorial was erected at Taman Musik Centrum by Arif Prasetya, Head of Bandung City Cemetery and Gardening Service. The names of 11 people killed in the incident were written on the monument.
