= Njoo Han Siang =

Indonesian journalist, businessman and film producer

Njoo Han Siang (杨汉祥) (Yogyakarta, 1930 – 1985) is a pioneer of Indonesian national banking and film industry. He is known as an idealist and has a wide range of interests. He was a journalist, entrepreneur, educator, Chinese ethnic assimilationist, lover of Indonesian art and culture and someone who cares about the nation's social and political life.

Njoo was born on August 31, 1930, in Yogyakarta. He came from a Chinese family who could speak both Hokkien and Javanese. Even though Njoo was born from the first generation of Chinese, he had adopted the values of Javanese culture since childhood. This acculturation has colored his life's journey where the business instincts he inherited from his parents were combined with his concerns for the Indonesian nation.

Njoo's social circle was wide and diverse, encompassing various ethnicities and religions as well as various professions such as businessmen, military, humanists, and politicians.

== Career Journey ==
- 1950 – Njoo studied journalism and started his career as a photojournalist for the Sunday Courier. He was good friends with B.M. Diah and Adam Malik.
- 1958 – Njoo founded the shipping airline PT. Delta Baru and had a food ingredients (rice and wheat) export-import business under the name of CV. Krisna.
- 1966 – Njoo, with Suhardiman (founder and chairman of the Central All-Indonesian Workers Organization (SOKSI)) and Thomas Suyatno, founded Bank Dharma Ekonomi which later became Bank Duta and is now better known as Bank Danamon.
- 1969 – Njoo helped Ali Murtopo become a logistics supplier for the Act of Free Choice (Pepera) referendum in Papua. From the revenue of this logistics operation, Murtopo's group set aside funds to found Bank Umum Nasional (BUN). Njoo served as President Commissioner for BUN.
- 1969 – Njoo Han Siang also initiated the establishment of the Akademi Perbankan Nasional which developed into Perbanas Institute (STIE Perbanas) and served as Chairman. To commemorate his services, the Njoo Han Siang monument was built in front of the STIE Perbanas campus.
- 1970 – Njoo and Sri Budoyo pioneered credit cards in Indonesia by establishing Diners Club International.
- 1972 – Njoo, together with Wim Umboh (a senior director from Manado and became a translator of Chinese films to Indonesian) and Aloysius Soegianto (a former colonel of Army’s Special Forces/RPKAD who had played a role in Operation Lotus and the Balibo declaration in Timor Timur 1975, and also former chairman of the Indonesian Kinology Association) founded PT. Inter Pratama Studio Laboratorium (Inter Pratama Studio) in Pasar Minggu with the aim of freeing the Indonesian film industry from foreign dependence.
- 1973 – Njoo, with Lie Siong Thay and Go Swie Kie, founded an agribusiness company PT. Great Giant Pineapple (GGP) and PT. Darmo Permai in Surabaya. In the same year, Njoo also held a Summer 28 music party (commemorating the 28th Indonesian independence day) which was attended by 17 bands that were popular at that time, such as Koes Plus, The Pros, AKA, and God Bless.
- 1976 – Njoo together with Jusuf Wanandi, Sofjan Wanandi, and Pang Lay Kim (father of Marie Elka Pangestu), founded the insurance company PT. Maskapai Asuransi Madijo which changed its name to PT. Asuransi Tata Wahana. In the same year, Njoo also founded the Bankers Club Indonesia as a forum for Indonesian bankers and served as its first chairman.
- 1978 – Njoo founded a restaurant, bar, and nightclub called Golden Gate at Kemayoran Airport and at the same time founded PT. Wai Halim in Lampung, a company engaged in the housing sector.
- 2004 – Njoo Han Siang was awarded with "Satya Lencana Wirakarya" by the President of the Republic of Indonesia, Megawati Soekarnoputri, at the commemoration of National Film Day for his services in the field of national cinematography.
- 2004 – The Ministry of Culture and Tourism, through the National Film Advisory Board (BPPN) as the organizer of the Indonesian Film Festival, giving out a special award called the Njoo Han Siang Special Award to the producer who made the most use of domestic film technical services. This is meant to remember and appreciate Njoo's struggles and to continue and motivate the spirit of independence to free Indonesian film from foreign dependence. The trophy was designed by Heru Sudjarwo.

== Filmography ==
The following are some of the films produced by Njoo Han Siang:

- Chicha (1976). This children's film was directed by Edward Pesta Sirait and starred Chicha Koeswoyo, Rae Sita, Ade Irawan, and Ria Irawan, with musical accompaniment by Idris Sardi and screenplay by Asrul Sani. This film won the Akhnaton Cup at the 2nd Cairo International Film Festival in Egypt in 1977.
- November 1828 (1978). This epic film about the Prince Diponegoro’s journey was directed by Teguh Karya and starred Slamet Raharjo, El Manik, Jenny Rachman, Sardono W. Kusumo and Maruli Sitompul. This film received 5 Citra Awards and was the best film at the Indonesia Film Festival 1978 and received the "Most Outstanding Historical Presentation Film" award at the Asia-Pacific Film Festival (FFAP).
- Rembulan dan Matahari (1979). This film, directed by Slamet Rahardjo, takes the theme of rural cultural values.
- Dr. Siti Pertiwi Kembali ke Desa (1979). This film was directed by Ami Priyono and starred Christine Hakim, El Manik, Joice Erna, Maruli Sitompul, and Ikranegara.
- Seputih Hatinya Semerah Bibirnya (1980). This film was directed by Slamet Rahardjo and starred Christine Hakim, El Manik, and Frans Tumbuan.
- Usia 18 (1980). This film was directed by Teguh Karya and starred Yessy Gusman and W. D. Mochtar.
