= Citra Award for Best Director =

Award given annually at the Indonesian Film Festival

- Awarded for: Best directing
- Country: Indonesia
- Presented by: Indonesian Film Festival
- First award: 1955
- Currently held by: Yandy Laurens, Sore: Wife from the Future (2025)

Highlights
- Most wins: Teguh Karya (6)
- Most nominations: Hanung Bramantyo (11)
- Website: festivalfilm.id

The Citra Award for Best Director (Indonesian: Piala Citra untuk Sutradara Terbaik) is an award given at the annual Indonesian Film Festival (FFI) to Indonesian film directors in recognition for their achievement in the previous year. The Citra Awards, described by Screen International as "Indonesia's equivalent to the Oscars", are the country's most prestigious film awards and are intended to recognize achievements in films as well as to draw public interest to the film industry.

Yandy Laurens is the most recent winner with his film Sore: Wife from the Future at the 2025 ceremony.

== History ==
The award was first given in 1955 with the winner of that year, Lilik Sudjio for his film Tarmina, being selected from all eligible films a jury panel without shortlisted nominations. Owing to efficiency concerns and widespread disapproval of winners within the Indonesian film industry, beginning in 1979 the FFI instituted a nomination system in which a committee selects the winner from a shortlist that could range between four and six films.

There were no Citra Awards given between 1993 and 2003 due to sharp decline in domestic film production. It was reinstated as an annual event in 2004 after receiving funds from the Indonesian government.

As of 2020, Teguh Karya is the most decorated director in the Citra Awards history with six wins out of nine nominations, while Hanung Bramantyo has the most nominations with eleven, winning two. In addition to them, six other directors have won multiple Citra Awards for Best Director: Arifin C. Noer, Edwin, Sjumandjaja, Slamet Rahardjo, Mouly Surya, and Joko Anwar.

With her win for Fiksi. in 2008, Mouly Surya became the first and, as of 2022, the only woman to have won the Best Director award. She won another one for Marlina the Murderer in Four Acts in 2018. Ida Farida holds the distinction as the first woman director to receive a nomination with Semua Sayang Kamu in 1989. Following the revival of Indonesian cinema in the mid-2000s, more women have received nominations for Best Director, including Kamila Andini who have received four nominations, Upi Avianto with three, and Nia Dinata with two.

The award has been revoked once, in 2007, after Nayato Fio Nuala's 2006 win for Ekskul garnered heavy criticisms due to the film's unauthorized use of copyrighted materials from the 2000 film Gladiator and the 2005 film Munich.

== Nominations and awards ==
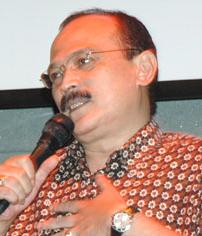
Eros Djarot won a Citra Award for Tjoet Nja' Dhien.

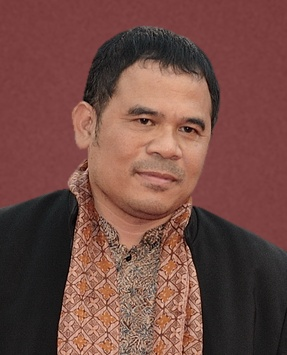
Garin Nugroho was nominated for a Citra Award for his debut, Cinta dalam Sepotong Roti and won for Memories of My Body.

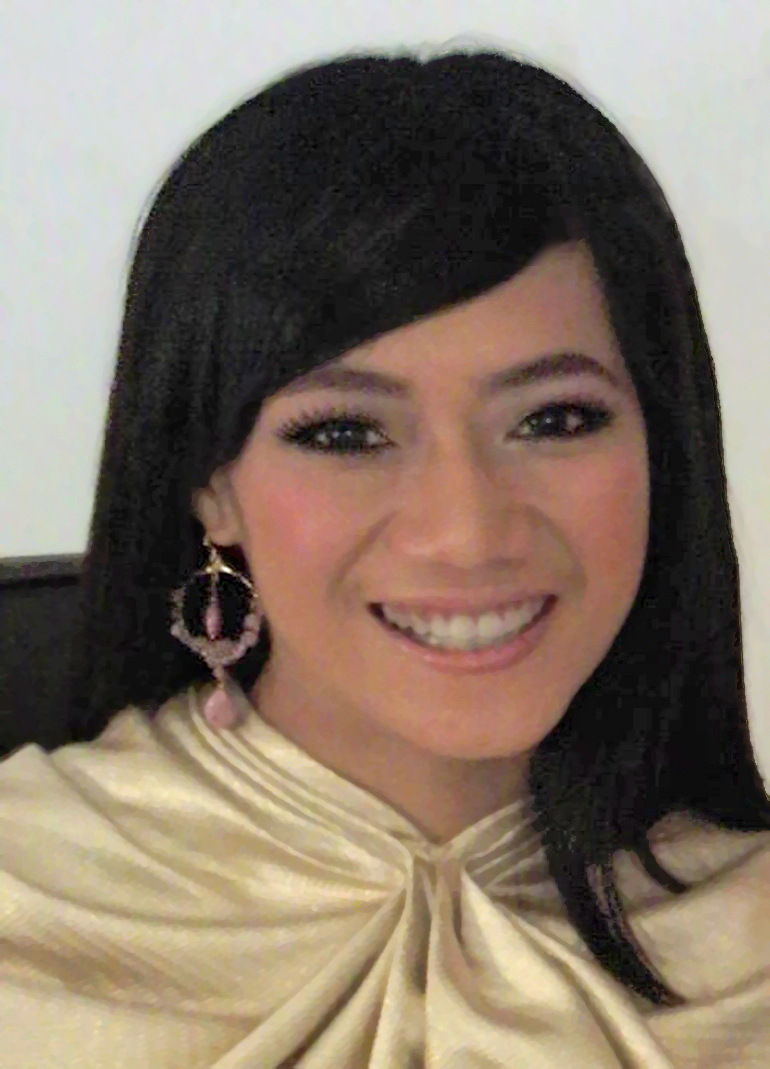
Nia Dinata has received two Citra Award nominations for Arisan! and Love for Share, but has yet to win.

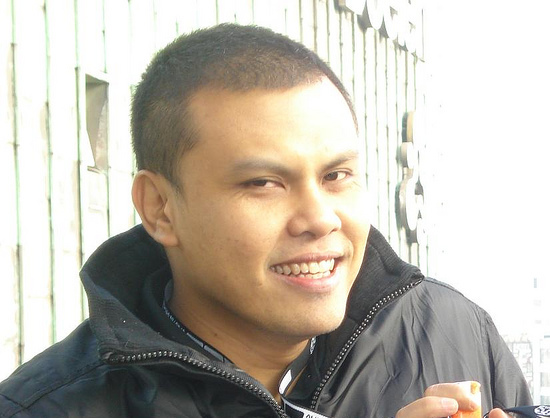
Joko Anwar won for A Copy of My Mind and Impetigore.

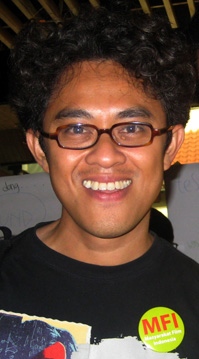
Riri Riza has received six Citra Award nominations, winning once for Athirah.

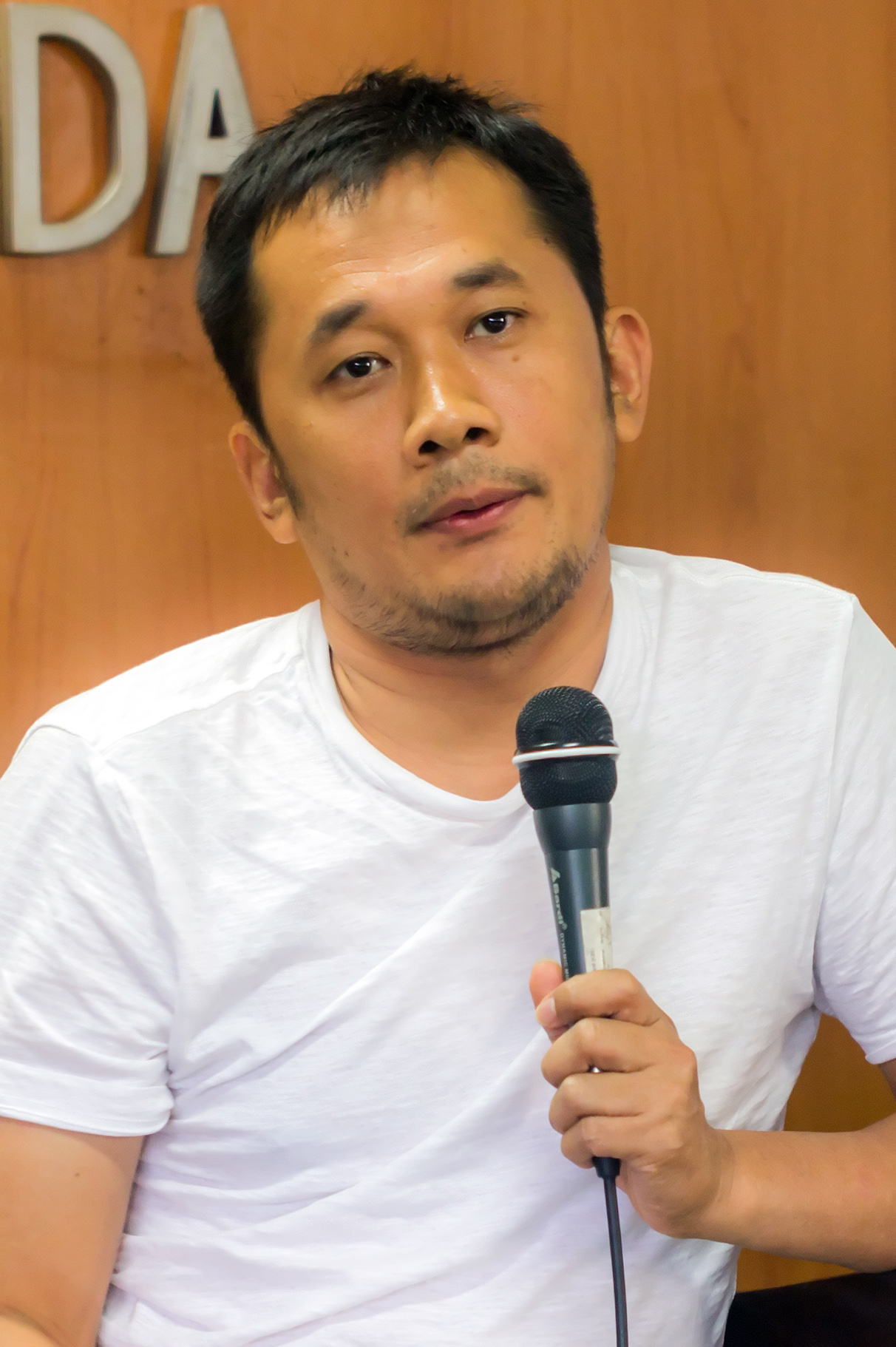
Hanung Bramantyo has received the most nominations with eleven, winning two for Brownies and Get Married.

Winners are highlighted in blue and listed in bold.

=== 1950s ===
Year	Recipient	Film	Ref
**1955** (1st)	**Lilik Sudjio**	**Tarmina**	
1956	NOT HELD		
1957	NOT HELD		
1958	NOT HELD		
1959	NOT HELD		

=== 1960s ===
Year	Recipient	Film	Ref
**1960** (2nd)	**Bachtiar Siagian**	**Turang**	
1961	NOT HELD		
1962	NOT HELD		
1963	NOT HELD		
1964	NOT HELD		
1965	NOT HELD		
1966	NOT HELD		
**1967** (3rd)	**Misbach Yusa Biran**	**Dibalik Tjahaja Gemerlapan**	
1968	NOT HELD		
1969	NOT HELD		

=== 1970s ===
Year	Recipient	Film	Ref
1970	NOT HELD		
1971	NOT HELD		
1972	NOT HELD		
**1973** (4th)	**Wim Umboh**	**Perkawinan**	
**1974** (5th)	**Teguh Karya**	**Cinta Pertama**	
**1975** (6th)	**Teguh Karya (2)**	**Ranjang Pengantin**	
**1976** (7th)	**Nico Pelamonia**	**Semalam di Malaysia**	
**1977** (8th)	**Sjumandjaja**	**Si Doel Anak Modern**	
**1978** (9th)	**Ami Priyono**	**Jakarta Jakarta**	
**1979** (10th)	**Teguh Karya (3)**	**November 1828**	
**1979** (10th)	Asrul Sani	Kemelut Hidup	
**1979** (10th)	Ismail Soebardjo	Binalnya Anak Muda	
**1979** (10th)	Wahyu Sihombing	Gara-Gara Isteri Muda	
**1979** (10th)	Wim Umboh	Pengemis dan Tukang Becak	

=== 1980s ===
Year	Recipient	Film	Ref
**1980** (11th)	**Frank Rorimpandey**	**Perawan Desa**	
**1980** (11th)	Arifin C. Noer	Harmonikaku	
**1980** (11th)	Arifin C. Noer	Yuyun Pasien Rumah Sakit Jiwa	
**1980** (11th)	Hasmanan	Anna Maria	
**1980** (11th)	Slamet Rahardjo	Rembulan dan Matahari	
**1980** (11th)	Sjumandjaja	Kabut Sutra Ungu	
**1981** (12th)	**Ismail Soebardjo**	**Perempuan dalam Pasungan**	
**1981** (12th)	Asrul Sani	Para Perintis Kemerdekaan	
**1981** (12th)	Eduart Pesta Sirait	Gadis Penakluk	
**1981** (12th)	Teguh Karya	Usia 18	
**1982** (13th)	**Arifin C. Noer**	**Serangan Fajar**	
**1982** (13th)	Eduart Pesta Sirait	Bukan Istri Pilihan	
**1982** (13th)	MT Risyaf	Bawalah Aku Pergi	
**1982** (13th)	Nico Pelamonia	Dr. Karmila	
**1982** (13th)	Sophan Sophiaan	Jangan Ambil Nyawaku	
**1983** (14th)	**Teguh Karya (4)**	**Di Balik Kelambu**	
**1983** (14th)	Ami Priyono	Roro Mendut	
**1983** (14th)	Chaerul Umam	Titian Serambut Dibelah Tujuh	
**1983** (14th)	Sjumandjaja	R.A. Kartini	
**1984** (15th)	**Sjumandjaja (2)**	**Budak Nafsu**	
**1984** (15th)	Ami Priyono	Yang	
**1984** (15th)	Arifin C. Noer	Pengkhianatan G30S/PKI	
**1984** (15th)	Sofyan Sharna	Sunan Kalijaga	
**1984** (15th)	Slamet Rahardjo	Ponirah Terpidana	
**1985** (16th)	**Slamet Rahardjo**	**Kembang Kertas**	
**1985** (16th)	Sjumandjaja	Kerikil-Kerikil Tajam	
**1985** (16th)	Teguh Karya	Doea Tanda Mata	
**1985** (16th)	Teguh Karya	Secangkir Kopi Pahit	
**1986** (17th)	**Teguh Karya (5)**	**Ibunda**	
**1986** (17th)	Arifin C. Noer	Matahari-Matahari	
**1986** (17th)	Chaerul Umam	Kejarlah Daku Kau Kutangkap	
**1986** (17th)	Eduart Pesta Sirait	Bila Saatnya Tiba	
**1986** (17th)	Sjumandjaja	Opera Jakarta	
**1987** (18th)	**Slamet Rahardjo (2)**	**Kodrat**	
**1987** (18th)	Arifin C. Noer	Biarkan Bulan Itu	
**1987** (18th)	Nya Abbas Akup	Cintaku di Rumah Susun	
**1987** (18th)	Sophan Sophiaan	Arini (Masih Ada Kereta yang Akan Lewat)	
**1987** (18th)	Wim Umboh	Secawan Anggur Kebimbangan	
**1988** (19th)	**Eros Djarot**	**Tjoet Nja' Dhien**	
**1988** (19th)	Frank Rorimpandey	Akibat Kanker Payudara	
**1988** (19th)	Nasri Cheppy	Catatan Si Boy	
**1988** (19th)	Slamet Rahardjo	Kasmaran	
**1988** (19th)	Wahyu Sihombing	Istana Kecantikan	
**1989** (20th)	**Teguh Karya (6)**	**Pacar Ketinggalan Kereta**	
**1989** (20th)	Buce Malawau	Tragedi Bintaro	
**1989** (20th)	Galeb Husein	Noesa Penida (Pelangi Kasih Pandansari)	
**1989** (20th)	Ida Farida	Semua Sayang Kamu	
**1989** (20th)	Imam Tantowi	Si Badung	

=== 1990s ===
Year	Recipient	Film	Ref
**1990** (21st)	**Arifin C. Noer (2)**	**Taksi**	
**1990** (21st)	Chaerul Umam	Joe Turun ke Desa	
**1990** (21st)	Putu Wijaya	Cas Cis Cus (Sonata di Tengah Kota)	
**1990** (21st)	Slamet Rahardjo	Langitku Rumahku	
**1990** (21st)	Sophan Sophiaan	Sesaat dalam Pelukan	
**1991** (22nd)	**Imam Tantowi**	**Soerabaia 45**	
**1991** (22nd)	Buce Malawau	Potret	
**1991** (22nd)	Garin Nugroho	Cinta dalam Sepotong Roti	
**1991** (22nd)	Labbes Widar	Lagu untuk Seruni	
**1991** (22nd)	Ucik Supra	Rebo & Robby	
**1992** (23rd)	**Chaerul Umam**	**Ramadhan dan Ramona**	
**1992** (23rd)	Arifin C. Noer	Bibir Mer	
**1992** (23rd)	Chaerul Umam	Nada dan Dakwah	
**1992** (23rd)	Galeb Husein	Kuberikan Segalanya	
**1992** (23rd)	Putu Wijaya	Plong (Naik Daun)	
1993	NOT HELD		
1994	NOT HELD		
1995	NOT HELD		
1996	NOT HELD		
1997	NOT HELD		
1998	NOT HELD		
1999	NOT HELD		

=== 2000s ===
Year	Recipient	Film	Ref
2000	NOT HELD		
2001	NOT HELD		
2002	NOT HELD		
2003	NOT HELD		
**2004** (24th)	**Rudy Soedjarwo**	**Ada Apa dengan Cinta?**	
**2004** (24th)	Nia Dinata	Arisan!	
**2004** (24th)	Riri Riza	Eliana, Eliana	
**2004** (24th)	Rudy Soedjarwo	Mengejar Matahari	
**2004** (24th)	Slamet Rahardjo	Marsinah: Cry Justice	
**2005** (25th)	**Hanung Bramantyo**	**Brownies**	
**2005** (25th)	Hanny Saputra	Virgin	
**2005** (25th)	Joko Anwar	Janji Joni	
**2005** (25th)	Riri Riza	Gie	
**2005** (25th)	Rudy Soedjarwo	Tentang Dia	
**2006** (26th)	**~~Nayato Fio Nuala~~** REVOKED	~~**Ekskul**~~	(Note: The award was revoked in 2007 due to copyright violation found in the film.)
**2006** (26th)	Hanny Saputra	Heart	
**2006** (26th)	John de Rantau	Denias, Senandung di Atas Awan	
**2006** (26th)	Nia Dinata	Berbagi Suami	
**2006** (26th)	Teddy Soeriaatmadja	Ruang	
**2007** (27th)	**Hanung Bramantyo (2)**	**Get Married**	
**2007** (27th)	Deddy Mizwar	Nagabonar Jadi 2	
**2007** (27th)	Hanung Bramantyo	Kamulah Satu-Satunya	
**2007** (27th)	Rako Prijanto	Merah Itu Cinta	
**2007** (27th)	Rudy Soedjarwo	Mengejar Mas-Mas	
**2008** (28th)	**Mouly Surya**	**Fiksi.**	
**2008** (28th)	Garin Nugroho	Under the Tree	
**2008** (28th)	Rachmania Arunita	Lost in Love	
**2008** (28th)	Upi Avianto	Radit & Jani	
**2008** (28th)	Viva Westi	May	
**2009** (29th)	**Aria Kusumadewa**	**Identitas**	
**2009** (29th)	Djenar Maesa Ayu	Mereka Bilang, Saya Monyet!	
**2009** (29th)	Hanung Bramantyo	Perempuan Berkalung Sorban	
**2009** (29th)	Ratna Sarumpaet	Jamila dan Sang Presiden	
**2009** (29th)	Teddy Soeriaatmadja	Ruma Maida	

=== 2010s ===
Year	Recipient	Film	Ref
**2010** (30th)	**Benni Setiawan**	**3 Hati Dua Dunia Satu Cinta**	
**2010** (30th)	Angga Dwimas Sasongko	Hari Untuk Amanda	
**2010** (30th)	Awi Suryadi	I Know What You Did on Facebook	
**2010** (30th)	Deddy Mizwar	Alangkah Lucunya (Negeri Ini)	
**2010** (30th)	Lola Amaria	Minggu Pagi di Victoria Park	
**2011** (31st)	**Ifa Isfansyah**	**The Dancer**	
**2011** (31st)	Benni Setiawan	Masih Bukan Cinta Biasa	
**2011** (31st)	Hanung Bramantyo	?	
**2011** (31st)	Hanung Bramantyo	Tendangan dari Langit	
**2011** (31st)	Kamila Andini	The Mirror Never Lies	
**2012** (32nd)	**Herwin Novianto**	**Tanah Surga... Katanya**	
**2012** (32nd)	Erwin Arnada	Rumah di Seribu Ombak	
**2012** (32nd)	Hanung Bramantyo	Perahu Kertas	
**2012** (32nd)	Sammaria Simanjuntak	Demi Ucok	
**2012** (32nd)	Teddy Soeriaatmadja	Lovely Man	
**2013** (33rd)	**Rako Prijanto**	**Sang Kiai**	
**2013** (33rd)	Dinna Jasanti	Laura and Marsha	
**2013** (33rd)	Hanung Bramantyo & Hestu Saputra	Cinta Tapi Beda	
**2013** (33rd)	Rizal Mantovani	5 cm	
**2013** (33rd)	Upi Avianto	Belenggu	
**2014** (34th)	**Adriyanto Dewo**	**Tabula Rasa**	
**2014** (34th)	Rako Prijanto	3 Nafas Likas	
**2014** (34th)	Lucky Kuswandi	In the Absence of the Sun	
**2014** (34th)	Hanung Bramantyo	Soekarno	
**2014** (34th)	Riri Riza	Sokola Rimba	
**2015** (35th)	**Joko Anwar**	**A Copy of My Mind**	
**2015** (35th)	Angga Dwimas Sasongko	Filosofi Kopi	
**2015** (35th)	Benni Setiawan	Toba Dreams	
**2015** (35th)	Eddie Cahyono	Siti	
**2015** (35th)	Ismail Basbeth	The Crescent Moon	
**2016** (36th)	**Riri Riza**	**Athirah**	
**2016** (36th)	Timo Tjahjanto & Kimo Stamboel (as The Mo Brothers)	Headshot	
**2016** (36th)	Yosep Anggi Noen	Solo, Solitude	
**2016** (36th)	Upi Avianto	My Stupid Boss	
**2016** (36th)	Pritagita Arianegara	Salawaku	
**2017** (37th)	**Edwin**	**Posesif**	
**2017** (37th)	Emil Heradi	Night Bus	
**2017** (37th)	Ernest Prakasa	Check the Store Next Door	
**2017** (37th)	Hanung Bramantyo	Kartini	
**2017** (37th)	Joko Anwar	Satan's Slaves	
**2017** (37th)	Ody C. Harahap	Sweet 20	
**2018** (38th)	**Mouly Surya (2)**	**Marlina the Murderer in Four Acts**	
**2018** (38th)	Kamila Andini	The Seen and Unseen	
**2018** (38th)	Edwin	Aruna & Her Palate	
**2019** (39th)	**Garin Nugroho**	**Memories of My Body**	
**2019** (39th)	Gina S. Noer	Two Blue Stripes	
**2019** (39th)	Hanung Bramantyo	This Earth of Mankind	
**2019** (39th)	Ravi L. Bharwani	27 Steps of May	
**2019** (39th)	Riri Riza	Glorious Days	

=== 2020s ===
Year	Recipient	Film	Ref
**2020** (40th)	**Joko Anwar (2)**	**Impetigore**	
**2020** (40th)	Faozan Rizal	Abracadabra	
**2020** (40th)	Riri Riza	Humba Dreams	
**2020** (40th)	Sim F	Susi Susanti: Love All	
**2020** (40th)	Yosep Anggi Noen	The Science of Fictions	
**2021** (41st)	**Wregas Bhanuteja**	**Photocopier**	
**2021** (41st)	Aria Kusumadewa	Angel Finds Wings	
**2021** (41st)	Kamila Andini	Yuni	
**2021** (41st)	Lucky Kuswandi	Ali & Ratu Ratu Queens	
**2021** (41st)	Randolph Zaini	Preman: Silent Fury	
**2021** (41st)	Riri Riza	Paranoia	
**2022** (42nd)	**Edwin (2)**	**Vengeance Is Mine, All Others Pay Cash**	
**2022** (42nd)	Bene Dion Rajagukguk	Missing Home	
**2022** (42nd)	Kamila Andini	Before, Now & Then	
**2022** (42nd)	Angga Dwimas Sasongko	Stealing Raden Saleh	
**2022** (42nd)	Makbul Mubarak	Autobiography	
**2023** (43rd)	**Jeremias Nyangoen**	**Women from Rote Island**	
**2023** (43rd)	Gina S. Noer	Like & Share	
**2023** (43rd)	Timo Tjahjanto	The Big 4	
**2023** (43rd)	Wregas Bhanuteja	Andragogy	
**2023** (43rd)	Yosep Anggi Noen	24 Hours with Gaspar	
**2024** (44th)	**Garin Nugroho**	**Samsara**	
**2024** (44th)	Edwin	Borderless Fog	
**2024** (44th)	Joko Anwar	Grave Torture	
**2024** (44th)	Tumpal Tampubolon	Crocodile Tears	
**2024** (44th)	Yandy Laurens	Falling In Love Like In Movies	
**2025** (45th)	**Yandy Laurens**	**Sore: Wife from the Future**	
**2025** (45th)	Joko Anwar	The Siege at Thorn High	
**2025** (45th)	Mouly Surya	This City Is a Battlefield	
**2025** (45th)	Ryan Adriandhy	Jumbo	
**2025** (45th)	Timo Tjahjanto	The Shadow Strays	

== Multiple wins and nominations ==
Wins	Nominations	Director
6	9	Teguh Karya
2	11	Hanung Bramantyo
2	8	Arifin C. Noer
2	7	Slamet Rahardjo
2	6	Sjumandjaja
2	4	Joko Anwar
2	3	Edwin
2	2	Mouly Surya
1	7	Riri Riza
1	5	Chaerul Umam
1	4	Benni Setiawan, Garin Nugroho, Rako Prijanto, Rudy Soedjarwo, Wim Umboh
1	3	Ami Priyono
1	2	Aria Kusumadewa, Frank Rorimpandey, Ismail Soebardjo, Nico Pelamonia, Wregas Bhanuteja
0	4	Kamila Andini
0	3	Angga Dwimas Sasongko, Eduart Pesta Sirait, Sophan Sophiaan, Teddy Soeriaatmadja, Upi Avianto, Yosep Anggi Noen
0	2	Asrul Sani, Buce Malawau, Deddy Mizwar, Galeb Husein, Gina S. Noer, Hanny Saputra, Imam Tantowi, Lucky Kuswandi, Nia Dinata, Putu Wijaya, Timo Tjahjanto, Wahyu Sihombing

== See also ==
- Cinema of Indonesia
- Indonesian Film Festival
- Citra Award for Best Picture
- Citra Award for Best Actor
- Citra Award for Best Actress
- Citra Award for Best Supporting Actor
- Citra Award for Best Supporting Actress
- Maya Awards
