= Ponirah Terpidana =

1984 film directed by Slamet Rahardjo

- Handbill
- Directed by: Slamet Rahardjo
- Screenplay by: Slamet Rahardjo
- Story by: Slamet Rahardjo
- Produced by: Manu Sukmajaya; A. Gunawan
- Starring: Nani Vidia; Slamet Rahardjo; Ray Sahetapy; Christine Hakim
- Cinematography: Tantra Surjadi
- Edited by: George Kamarullah
- Music by: Eros Djarot
- Production company: Sukma Putra Film
- Release date: 1984 (Indonesia)
- Running time: 107 minutes
- Country: Indonesia
- Language: Indonesian

Ponirah Terpidana (literally Ponirah is Convicted) is a 1984 Indonesian drama film directed by Slamet Rahardjo. Starring Nani Vidia, Rahardjo, and Ray Sahetapy, it follows a young woman named Ponirah who becomes a prostitute and is arrested for the murder of a rich businessman. The film, which combined traditional and contemporary elements, was a critical success in Indonesia. It won three Citra Awards at the 1984 Indonesian Film Festival, from a total of eleven nominations.

== Plot ==
Since birth Ponirah has lived a cursed life. Her mother died while birthing her and her brother Permadi is hit by a truck while riding a bicycle with her. This leads her father, Jabarudi, to go temporarily insane and nearly stab her with a kris. Their maid, Trindil (Christine Hakim), brings Ponirah with her and escapes the city, settling in Yogyakarta. Trindil becomes a prostitute to support herself and Ponirah; the two live at the brothel.

When Ponirah (Nani Vidia) is in senior high school, she finds that the new teacher Guritno (Slamet Rahardjo) is watching her closely. Unknown to her, he is in fact her uncle who was asked by Ponirah's late father to find her. After a misunderstanding with Trindil, Ponirah goes to Jakarta with a charming young man named Jarkasi (Ray Sahetapy), who is actually a trafficker tasked with luring young women to work as prostitutes. Although he falls in love with Ponirah and refuses to do this task, Ponirah says she wants to be the most expensive prostitute in the city. They part.

As Ponirah is picked up by a rich man named Franky Darling (Teguh Karya), Jarkasi meets Guritno and the two decide to save Ponirah. When they assault Franky's apartment, Ponirah – who has grown to hate men and intends to kill Franky – mistakes Guritno for her client and stabs her uncle with a pair of scissors, killing him. When the police come, Jarkasi tells them that he killed Guritno and prepares to be punished. However, the investigation reveals that Ponirah had delivered the killing blow and she is thus incarcerated.

== Production ==
Ponirah Terpidana was written and directed by Slamet Rahardjo for Sukma Putra Film. It was produced by Manu Sukmajaya and A. Gunawan, with Tantra Surjadi on camera and editing by George Kamarullah. Rahardjo's brother Eros Djarot handled the musical arrangement, while Suparman Sidik handled sound. Benny Benhardi handled artistic direction.

The film starred Nani Vidia and Bambang Hermanto, with other roles filled by Christine Hakim, Bambang Hermanto, Slamet Rahardjo, Ray Sahetapy, Teguh Karya, Nano Riantiarno, and Ratna Riantiarno. Much of the cast had worked together for Karya's Teater Populer, with Hakim, Karya, Nano Riantiarno, and Rahardjo having previously collaborated on films like Cinta Pertama (First Love; 1973). Hermanto had been in cinema for over thirty years, rising to fame after starring in D. Djajakusuma's Harimau Tjampa (Tiger from Tjampa) in 1953. Meanwhile, Vidia was a new actor, making her feature film debut with Ponirah Terpidana.

== Themes ==
Nauval Yazid of The Jakarta Post writes that Ponirah Terpidana has a "women-who-suffer-continuously theme", one common in Indonesian films. He compares the later critical hit Jamila dan Sang Presiden (Jamila and the President; 2009) to the film, noting that the latter film – following a prostitute who murders a rich government official – was reminiscent of Ponirah Terpidana. Gotot Prakosa, another writer for The Jakarta Post describes it as an art film, combining traditional and contemporary elements.

== Release and reception ==
Ponirah Terpidana received a wide release in 1984, although in 1983 it was screened at the Three Continents Festival in France. According to Prakosa, foreign reviews criticised a scene at the end which showed a red-light district in Jakarta. Eleanor Mannikka of allRovi gave the film three and a half out of five stars.

A 35 mm and VHS copy is stored at Sinematek Indonesia in Jakarta.

== Awards ==
Ponirah Terpidana was nominated for eleven Citra Awards at the 1984 Indonesian Film Festival, winning three. It was defeated in four categories, including Best Director and Best Leading Actress, by Sjumandjaja's Budak Nafsu (Slave to Lust; 1984), while Arifin C. Noer's Pengkhianatan G30S/PKI (Betrayal of G30S/PKI; 1984) took Best Screenplay. The film also won a special jury prize at the 1983 Three Continents Festival.

Award	Year	Category	Recipient	Result
Three Continents Festival	1983	Special Jury Prize		Won
Indonesian Film Festival	1984	Best Film		Nominated
Indonesian Film Festival	1984	Best Director	Slamet Rahardjo	Nominated
Indonesian Film Festival	1984	Best Screenplay	Slamet Rahardjo	Nominated
Indonesian Film Festival	1984	Best Leading Actor	Ray Sahetapy	Nominated
Indonesian Film Festival	1984	Best Leading Actress	Christine Hakim	Nominated
Indonesian Film Festival	1984	Best Supporting Actor	Bambang Hermanto	Won
Indonesian Film Festival	1984	Best Supporting Actor	Slamet Rahardjo	Nominated
Indonesian Film Festival	1984	Best Cinematography	Tantra Surjadi	Won
Indonesian Film Festival	1984	Best Artistic Direction	Benny Benhardi	Nominated
Indonesian Film Festival	1984	Best Editing	George Kamarullah	Won
Indonesian Film Festival	1984	Best Musical Direction	Eros Djarot	Nominated

== Works cited ==
- "Bambang Hermanto". filmindonesia.or.id (in Indonesian). Jakarta: Konfiden Foundation. Archived from the original on 17 April 2014.
- Asrianti, Tifa (25 January 2009). "Eros Djarot: Makes a comeback with new album". The Jakarta Post. Jakarta. Archived from the original on 12 October 2012.
- "Kredit Cinta Pertama". filmindonesia.or.id (in Indonesian). Jakarta: Konfiden Foundation. Archived from the original on 18 July 2014.
- "Kredit Ponirah Terpidana". filmindonesia.or.id (in Indonesian). Jakarta: Konfiden Foundation. Archived from the original on 3 July 2015.
- Mannikka, Eleanor. "Ponirah Terpidana". AllMovie (in Indonesian). allRovi. Archived from the original on 28 October 2017.
- "Nani Vidia". filmindonesia.or.id (in Indonesian). Jakarta: Konfiden Foundation. Archived from the original on 28 June 2017.
- "Penghargaan Budak Nafsu" [Awards for Budak Nafsu]. filmindonesia.or.id (in Indonesian). Jakarta: Konfidan Foundation. Archived from the original on 18 July 2014.
- "Penghargaan Pengkhianatan G-30-S PKI" [Awards for Pengkhianatan G-30-S PKI]. filmindonesia.or.id (in Indonesian). Jakarta: Konfidan Foundation. Archived from the original on 31 March 2014.
- "Penghargaan Ponirah Terpidana" [Awards for Ponirah Terpidana]. filmindonesia.or.id (in Indonesian). Jakarta: Konfiden Foundation. Archived from the original on 1 July 2015.
- "Ponirah Terpidana". filmindonesia.or.id (in Indonesian). Jakarta: Konfiden Foundation. Archived from the original on 17 May 2015.
- Prakosa, Gotot (24 December 2000). "Slamet wants to bring Marsinah back from the grave". The Jakarta Post. Archived from the original on 17 June 2009.
- Yazid, Nauval (3 May 2009). "A very irresistible 'Jamila'". The Jakarta Post. Archived from the original on 17 June 2009.
