= Teater Populer =

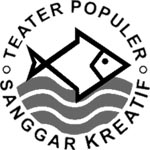
Teater Populer Logo

Teater Populer is an Indonesian theater company founded in 1968 by Teguh Karya and members of the Akademi Teater Nasional Indonesia (ATNI). Many famous Indonesian actors have worked for the company.

== History ==
Teater Populer was founded on October 14, 1968, at the Hotel Indonesia in Jakarta. Led by Teguh Karya, the company practiced every day in the hotel ballroom. Its first two productions were Antara Dua Perempuan by Alice Gerstenberg and Ghosts by Henrik Ibsen. Teater Populer gained popularity quickly, selling 3000 tickets per play. The company left the Hotel Indonesia to become an independent theater company.

Some of the company's productions include Jayaprana by Jef Last, Bodas de sangre by Federico García Lorca, Revizor by Nikolai Gogol, Woyzeck by Georg Büchner, and Perempuan Pilihan Dewa by Bertolt Brecht, all of which were directed by Karya.

Before his death in 2001, Karya founded the "Teater Populer Foundation," now led by legendary Indonesian artist Slamet Rahardjo.

== Television and film ==
The Teater Populer was not only active in stage production, it also produced feature films and television plays. Its first film, Wadjah Seorang Laki-laki, was released in 1971.

== Notable alumni ==
Famous alumni of the Teater Populer include:

- Teguh Karya
- Slamet Rahardjo
- Christine Hakim
- Franky Rorimpandey
- George Kamarullah
- Hengky Solaiman
- Benny Benhardi
- Niniek L. Karim
- Sylvia Widiantono
- Dewi Matindas
- Alex Komang
- Arya Dega
- Mieke Wijaya
- Nungki Kusumastuti
- Tri Rahardjo
- Hendro Djarot.
