= Di Balik Kelambu =

- Directed by: Teguh Karya
- Written by: Teguh Karya
- Produced by: Manu Sukmajaya
- Starring: Christine Hakim; Slamet Rahardjo
- Edited by: George Kamarullah
- Distributed by: PT Sukma Putra Film
- Release date: 1983
- Running time: 94 minutes
- Country: Indonesia
- Language: Indonesian

Di Balik Kelambu (Behind the Mosquito Net) is a 1983 Indonesian film directed by Teguh Karya. It stars Christine Hakim and Slamet Rahardjo.

== Plot ==
Hasan (Slamet Rahardjo) and Nurlela (Christine Hakim) are a newly married couple living at the home of Nurlela's father (Maruli Sitompul) because they do not have enough money to find a place of their own. Nurlela's father constantly compares Hasan negatively to his rich son-in-law Bakri (August Melasz), causing friction between the young couple. They eventually find a way to move out.

== Style ==
Film critic Hikmat Dramawan, writing for the National Library of Indonesia, called the film "acting-focused", with the camerawork serving to reinforce the acting. He describes it as coming across like an art film, based on its camerawork.

== Themes ==
Dramawan notes that the Di Balik Kelambu draws heavily on Indonesian family values, and is capable of illustrating the economic and social hardships undergone by families at the time. He describes it as an "adult drama". Parmita Uniyal, writing in the Hindustan Times, notes that the film portrays how economic and professional failure can lead to the loss of independence and the will to live.

== Release and reception ==
Di Balik Kelambu was released in 1983 and did well commercially. El Masrur Sahlan, writing for Tabloid Bintang, notes that Rahardjo and Hakim (who often played lovers) had their best chemistry in the film, with both playing their parts as if it were truly happening to them. Uniyal also noted that the two came across convincingly, with Rahardjo's character coming across subtly and Hakim's being more emotional.

== Awards ==
Di Balik Kelambu was nominated for nine Citra Awards, winning six.

- Best Film (winner)
- Best Director (Teguh Karya, winner)
- Best Leading Actor (Slamet Rahardjo, winner)
- Best Leading Actress (Christine Hakim, winner)
- Best Supporting Actor (Maruli Sitompul, winner)
- Best Editing (George Kamarullah, winner)
- Best Original Screenplay (Teguh Karya, nominated)
- Best Supporting Actress (Sylvia Widiantono, nominated)
- Best Cinematography (Benny Benhardi and Satari SK, nominated)
