= Laila Sari =

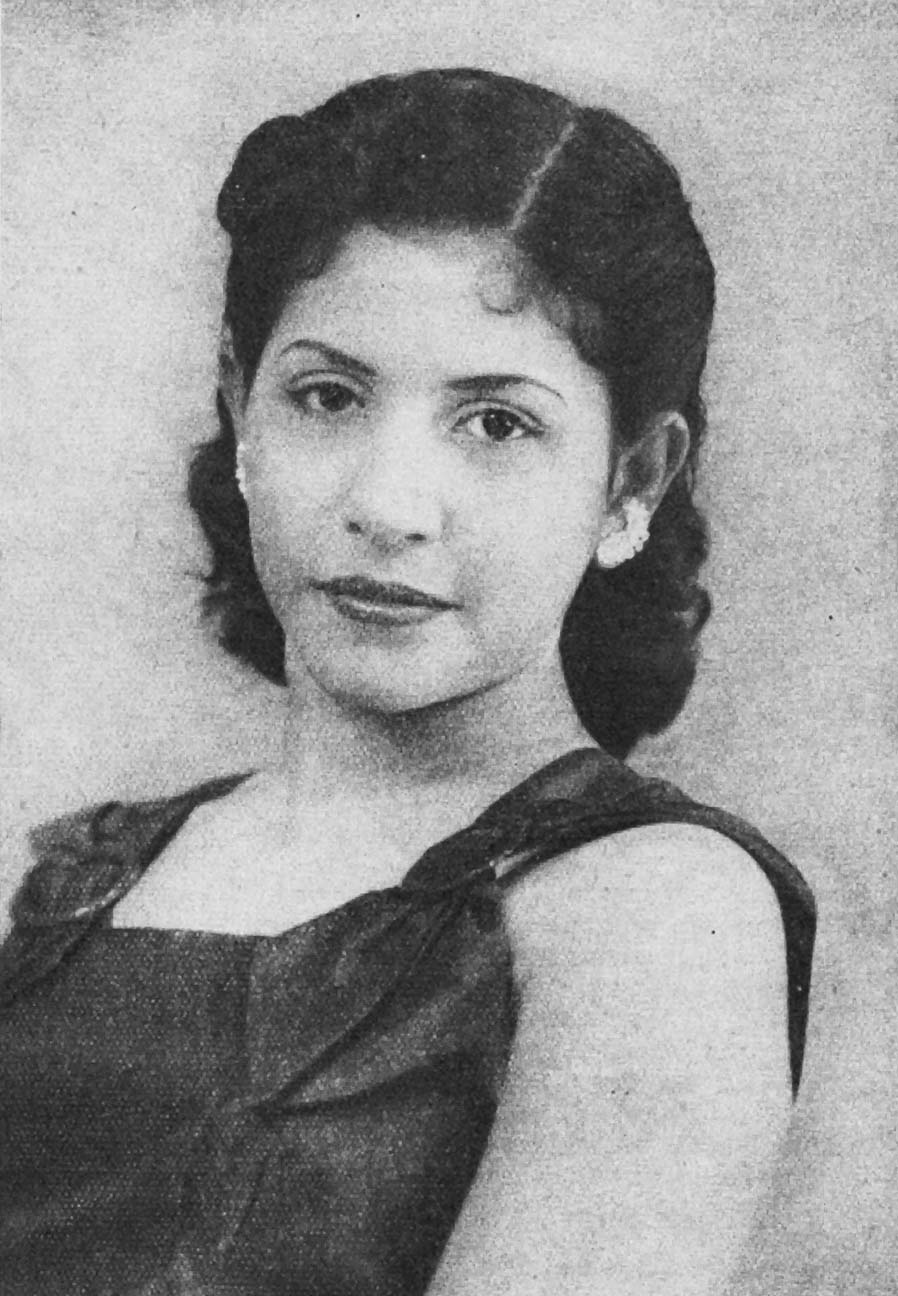
- Sari in 1955

Background information
- Born: Nur Laila Sari Jahrotuljannah; 4 November 1935; Padang Pandjang, Sumatra, Dutch East Indies
- Died: 20 November 2017 (aged 82) Jakarta, Indonesia
- Genres: Rock; Children's
- Occupations: Singer; actress

Hajjah Laila Sari (born Nur Laila Sari Jahrotuljannah; 4 November 1935 (Note: After marriage, she originally reported her year of birth as 1940. This was to give the impression that her husband was older than her. Mardiyati 2010, A Flower in the Eve.) – 20 November 2017) was an Indonesian comedian and singer of rock and children's songs. She has been nicknamed the "energetic old lady" (nenek-nenek lincah) for her on-stage persona.

== Biography ==
Sari was born Nurlaila Sari Jahrotuljannah in Padang Panjang, West Sumatra, on 4 November 1935. Her father died when she was two, and the following year her grandparents took her from her singer mother Amak to live on Java. There, she was raised in a devout Muslim environment.

She went back to live her mother and new stepfather at the age of nine, then — after a period disapproving of her mother's singing career for religious reasons and studying ballet — began singing as an easy way to earn money. She made her debut by singing at a wedding party in Pontianak, West Kalimantan with her parents.

Sari continued to perform in concerts, although she did not release any albums during her career. She performed for soldiers and President Sukarno often invited her to perform during Independence Day celebrations at the Presidential Palace. As she became more famous throughout the archipelago, she found herself increasingly sought after by men seeking romance; in a 2010 interview with The Jakarta Globe, Sari recalled that at times they fought over her. In 1955 she appeared in her first film. Three years later, she was banned from performing in Bekasi and Karawang (both in West Java) when committees of women feared she would steal their husbands.

In 1960, Sari married a Dutchman named Boertje (Indonesian: Murdadi Iskandar), who was five years her junior. As Sari was infertile, the two adopted a child. Sari continued to act, including playing Slamet Rahardjo's love interest in Teguh Karya's 1971 film Wadjah Seorang Laki-Laki (The Face of a Boy).

In 1993, Boertje had a stroke and Sari cut back on her singing and acting to tend to him and her ailing mother; to fund the medical treatment, she sold her cars and second house in Cengkareng, West Jakarta. Bertje died in 2000, a week after Sari's mother. After several offers to go on the Hajj —- the pilgrimage to Mecca mandatory to able-bodied Muslims — she eventually accepted an offer by actress Desy Ratnasari and her family, who were going that year; Ratnasari covered all expenses incurred during the trip, while Sari managed to do some commercials to have extra money for her family.

Since then, Sari played comedic roles on television; she also spends time entertaining the elderly at nursing homes. In May 2005 she won a lifetime achievement award from the Inspiring Women Awards in Jakarta. She lived with her family, including her great-granddaughter, in Tangkiwood, West Jakarta; they lived in poverty.

Laila Sari died on 20 November 2017 from undisclosed causes, aged 82.

== Style ==
Since her debut, Sari has worn mainly modest clothing. While singing, she used exaggerated movements and wore a kain (similar to a sarong), long sleeved shirt, and headscarf. While performing on variety shows, she preferred brightly coloured wigs and children's dress.

== Filmography ==
During her career, Sari has performed in more than 20 films.

- Dinamika (Dynamics; 1955)
- Peristiwa 10 November (10 November Incident; 1956)
- Singa Betina dari Marunda (The Lioness from Marunda; 1971)
- Wadjah Seorang Laki-Laki (The Face of a Boy; 1971)
- Warung Pojok (Corner Store; 1977)
- Pulau Putri (Woman Island; 1977)
- Inem Nyonya Besar (Inem the Big Mistress; 1977)
- Tuan Besar (Big Man; 1977)
- Sinyo Adi (1977)
- Kembang Semusim (A Season's Flower; 1980)
- Juara Cilik (Young Champion; 1980)
- Ketika Cinta Harus Memilih (When Love Must Choose; 1981)
- Halimun (1982)
- Ke Ujung Dunia (To the Ends of the Earth; 1983)
- Tante Garang (Fierce Aunt; 1983)
- Kelainan Cinta (Forgetful in Love; 1983)
- Perempuan Kedua (Second Woman; 1990)
- Lupus IV (1990)
- Amrin Membolos (Amrin Plays Hooky; 1996)
- Anda Puas, Saya Loyo (You're Satisfied, I'm Exhausted; 2008)
- Cinlok (Love on Location; 2008)
- Anak Ajaib (Magic Child; 2008)
- Hantu Tanah Kusir (Ghost of Tanah Kusir; 2010)
