= Alang-alang =

Alang-alang may refer to:

== Indonesia ==
- Indonesian for Imperata cylindrica, a species of grass
- Alang-Alang (film), a 1939 film from the Dutch East Indies
- Alang-Alang (TV series), a 1994 television serial from Indonesia

== Philippines ==
- Alangalang, Leyte, a municipality in the Philippines
- Alang-alang, a barangay in the city of Borongan, Eastern Samar, Philippines
- Alang-alang, a barangay in the city of Mandaue, Philippines
- Alang-alang, a barangay in the city of Surigao, Surigao del Norte, Philippines
- Alang-alang, a barangay in the municipality of Tabogon, Cebu, Philippines
- Alang-alang, a barangay in the municipality of General MacArthur, Eastern Samar, Philippines
- Alang-alang, a barangay in the municipality of Oras, Eastern Samar, Philippines
- Alang-alang, a barangay in the municipality of Quinapondan, Eastern Samar, Philippines
- Alang-alang, a barangay in the municipality of Lapinig, Northern Samar, Philippines
- Alang-alang, a barangay in the municipality of Aurora, Zamboanga del Sur, Philippines
- Alang-alang, a barangay in the municipality of Tambulig, Zamboanga del Sur, Philippines
