= Slamet Rahardjo =

Indonesian actor, director, and screenwriter (born 1949)

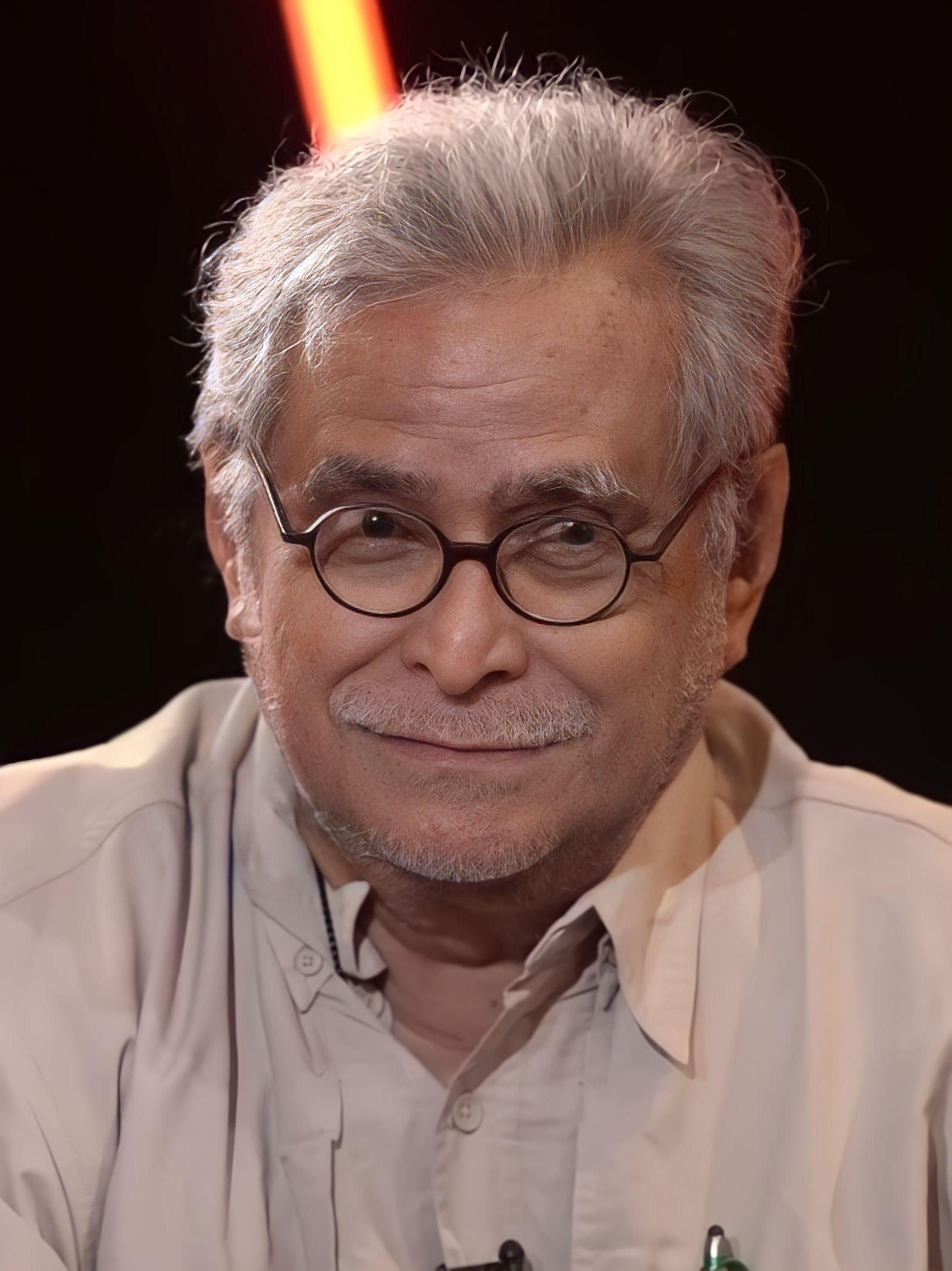
- Rahardjo in 2023
- Born: Slamet Rahardjo Djarot; 21 January 1949 (age 77); Serang, West Java, Indonesia
- Education: National Indonesian Theatre Academy
- Occupations: Actor; Director; Screenwriter
- Years active: 1971–present
- Spouse: Mira Surianegara (m. 1984)
- Children: Laras Rahardjo Djarot; Kasih Rahardjo Djarot
- Parent(s): Djarot Djojoprawiro (father); Ennie Tanudiredja (mother)
- Relatives: Eros Djarot (younger brother)
- Awards: Citra Award for Best Leading Actor 1975 Ranjang Pengantin 1983 Di Balik Kelambu

Slamet Rahardjo Djarot (Note: Under modern Indonesian orthography, his name would be spelled as Slamet Raharjo Jarot) (born 21 January 1949) is an Indonesian actor, director, and screenwriter of Javanese-Bantenese descent. He is the elder brother of director, songwriter, and politician, Eros Djarot. Since his directorial debut in 1979 with Rembulan dan Matahari, he has directed and/or written twelve films; one of which, Langitku, Rumahku, was Indonesia's submission to the 63rd Academy Awards in 1991.

== Biography ==
Rahardjo was born in Serang, West Java (now Banten), on 21 January 1949. He was the first of seven children born to Djarot Djojoprawiro, an air force officer, and Ennie Tanudiredja, a housewife interested in woodcarving. Rahardjo spent most of his childhood in Yogyakarta, where he dreamed of becoming a visual artist. However, after finishing high school at State Senior High School 2, he attended the National Indonesian Theatre Academy (Akademi Teater Nasional Indonesia, or ATNI). During his studies at ATNI, he befriended Teguh Karya. Together, the two founded the theatre group Teater Populer in 1968.

Three years later, Teater Populer, working together with Sarinade Film, produced Wadjah Seorang Laki-Laki (The Face of a Boy). Rahardjo was immediately cast in the lead role, while Karya directed the film; singer Laila Sari was cast as his love interest. Two years later, Rahardjo starred in 1973's Cinta Pertama (First Love) alongside Christine Hakim; the two would later star as romantic leads in several other films, and in 2010 were selected as the second best Indonesian cinema couple by Tabloid Bintang. After the success of Cinta Pertama, Rahardjo went on to play in 1975's Ranjang Pengantin (Wedding Bed), 1976's Perkawinan Dalam Semusim (A Season's Marriage) and 1977's Badai Pasti Berlalu (The Storm Will Surely Pass). During this period, Rahardjo would only work for Karya; he reportedly left a dinner meeting immediately after another director asked him to act in a film, later telling Tempo that it was as if the director was borrowing a tape recorder, not considering how Rahardjo would feel.

In 1979, Rahardjo made his directorial debut with Rembulan dan Matahari (The Moon and the Sun). That same year, he played in November 1828; he also served as one of the film's production designers. Two years later he directed Seputih Hatinya, Semerah Bibirnya (As White as the Heart, as Red as the Lips). In 1982, he starred alongside Hakim in Di Balik Kelambu (Behind the Mosquito Net); the two played newlyweds living at the bride's parents home. This was followed by several other directorial efforts, including Ponirah Terpidana (Ponirah is Convicted; 1984), Kembang Kertas (Paper Flowers; 1984), Kodrat (1985), and Kasmaran (Falling in Love; 1987).

In 1988 Rahardjo played National Hero of Indonesia Teuku Umar, an Acehnese revolutionary hero, in Tjoet Nja' Dhien; the film was directed by his younger brother Eros Djarot. The following year, Rahardjo directed Langitku, Rumahku (My Sky, My Home). The film, nominated for 9 Citra Awards at the 1990 Indonesian Film Festival, went on to win the Three Continents Festival that same year. In 1997, after the collapse of Indonesian cinema, he starred in the musical drama Melangkah Di Atas Awan (A Walk in the Clouds). He portrays Sastro, Tita's husband who isn't rich.

After Karya's death in 2001, Rahardjo took over as leader of Teater Populer. The following year, he released Marsinah, a biopic of the workers' rights activist of the same name who was killed in 1993.

In 2007, Rahardjo took the role of Siska's father in Teddy Soeriaatmadja's remake of Badai Pasti Berlalu; he was the only cast member of the original film to act in the remake. In 2010 he played in Alangkah Lucunya (Negeri Ini) (How Funny (This Country Is)) as the father of a street child; that same year he played the primary antagonist in Hanung Bramantyo's biopic of Muhammadiyah founder Ahmad Dahlan. In 2011 he played Ki Kartareja in Ifa Isfansyah's Sang Penari (The Dancer), an adaptation of Ahmad Tohari's trilogy Ronggeng Dukuh Paruk.

== Selected filmography ==
=== Acting credits ===
- Wadjah Seorang Laki-Laki (Face of a Man; 1971)
- Cinta Pertama (First Love; 1973)
- Ranjang Pengantin (Wedding Bed; 1974)
- Perkawinan Dalam Semusim (A Season's Marriage; 1976)
- Badai Pasti Berlalu (The Storm Will Surely Pass; 1977)
- November 1828 (1978)
- Di Balik Kelambu (Behind the Mosquito Net; 1982)
- Ponirah Terpidana (Ponirah is Convicted; 1984)
- Kodrat (1986)
- Tjoet Nja' Dhien (1988)
- Melangkah Di Atas Awan (A Walk in the Clouds; 1997)
- Pasir Berbisik (Whispering Sands; 2001)
- Kutunggu di Sudut Semanggi (I'll Wait by Semanggi; 2004)
- Putri Gunung Ledang (Princess of Mount Ledang; 2004)
- Banyu Biru (Blue Banyu; 2005)
- Ruang (Room; 2006)
- Badai Pasti Berlalu (The Storm Will Surely Pass; 2007)
- Namaku Dick (My Name is Dick; 2008)
- Laskar Pelangi (Rainbow Troops; 2008)
- Cinta Setaman (A Homegrown Love; 2008)
- Lastri (2008)
- Ketika Cinta Bertasbih (When Love Prays; 2009)
- Bahwa Cinta Itu Ada (That Love Exists; 2010)
- Bebek Belur (Destroyed Duck; 2010)
- Alangkah Lucunya (Negeri Ini) (How Funny (This Country Is); 2010)
- Sang Pencerah (The Enlightener; 2010)
- Kabayan Jadi Milyuner (Kabayan Becomes a Millionaire; 2010)
- Sang Penari (The Dancer; 2011)
- Dilema (Dilemma; 2012)
- Sweet 20 (2017)
- Cinta, Pertama & Ketiga (First, Second & Third Love; 2021)
- Siksa Neraka (Torment of Hell; 2023)
- Siksa Kubur (Grave Torture; 2024)
- Gowok: Javanese Kamasutra (2025)
- Children of Heaven (2026)

== Accolades ==
Rahardjo has received two Citra Awards at the Indonesian Film Festival for his acting, the first in 1975 for Ranjang Pengantin and the second for Di Balik Kelambu. Although he has yet to receive a Citra Award for screenwriting, six of his films have been nominated: Rembulan dan Matahari, Di Balik Kelambu, Ponirah Terpidana, Kodrat, Kasmaran and Langitku, Rumahku. Langitku, Rumahku represented Indonesia at the 63rd Academy Awards in 1991 for the Academy Award for Best Foreign Language Film, but was not nominated; this came the year after Eros's film Tjoet Nja' Dhien was submitted to the Academy. In 1996 Rahardjo received the Usmar Ismail Prize from the National Film Consideration Body.

=== Directing and writing credits ===
- Rembulan dan Matahari (The Moon and the Sun; 1979)
- Seputih Hatinya Semerah Kertas (As White as the Heart, as Red as the Lips; 1981)
- Ponirah Terpidana (Ponirah is Convicted; 1984)
- Kembang Kertas (Paper Flowers; 1985)
- Kodrat (1986)
- Kasmaran (Falling in Love; 1987)
- Langitku, Rumahku (My Sky, My Home; 1990)
- Fatamorgana (1992)
- Anak Hilang (Missing Child; 1993)
- Telegram (2000)
- Marsinah (2002)
- Batas (Limit; 2011)

=== Awards and nominations ===
Year	Award	Category	Recipients	Result
Indonesian Film Festival	1975	Citra Award for Best Leading Actor	Ranjang Pengantin	Won
Indonesian Film Festival	1980	Citra Award for Best Director	Rembulan dan Matahari	Nominated
Indonesian Film Festival	1983	Citra Award for Best Leading Actor	Di Balik Kelambu	Won
Indonesian Film Festival	1984	Citra Award for Best Supporting Actor	Ponirah Terpidana	Nominated
Indonesian Film Festival	1984	Citra Award for Best Director	Ponirah Terpidana	Nominated
Indonesian Film Festival	1985	Citra Award for Best Director	Kembang Kertas	Won
Indonesian Film Festival	1987	Citra Award for Best Leading Actor	Kodrat	Nominated
Indonesian Film Festival	1987	Citra Award for Best Director	Kodrat	Won
Indonesian Film Festival	1988	Citra Award for Best Director	Kasmaran	Nominated
Indonesian Film Festival	1988	Citra Award for Best Supporting Actor	Tjoet Nja' Dhien	Nominated
Indonesian Film Festival	1990	Citra Award for Best Director	My Sky, My Home	Nominated
Indonesian Film Festival	2004	Citra Award for Best Director	Marsinah: Cry Justice	Nominated
Indonesian Film Festival	2004	Citra Award for Best Supporting Actor	Pasir Berbisik	Nominated
Indonesian Film Festival	2015	Citra Award for Best Supporting Actor	Filosofi Kopi	Nominated
Indonesian Film Festival	2017	Citra Award for Best Supporting Actor	Sweet 20	Nominated
