= Wadjah Seorang Laki-laki =

- Directed by: Teguh Karya
- Written by: Teguh Karya
- Produced by: Turino Djunaidy
- Starring: Slamet Rahardjo; W.D. Mochtar; Tuti Indra Malaon; N. Riantiarno; Laila Sari
- Cinematography: Tantra Suryadi
- Edited by: Tantra Suryadi
- Music by: Idris Sardi
- Production company: Sarinande Films
- Release date: 1971
- Running time: 110 minutes
- Country: Indonesia
- Language: Indonesian

Wadjah Seorang Laki-laki (Perfected Spelling Wajah Seorang Laki-laki, released internationally as Ballad of a Man) is a 1971 Indonesian film directed by Teguh Karya. It marked his directorial debut.

== Plot ==
In 19th-century Batavia (modern day Jakarta) a young man, Amallo (Slamet Rahardjo), rises up against his father, Umbu Kapitan (WD Mochtar), after his father's boorishness and irresponsibility lead to his mother's death. This is sparked by the father's subsequent marriage to a mixed-race woman. Amallo begins stealing horses from his father and smuggling weapons used to fight against the Dutch East India Company, for whom his father works.

As Amallo struggles against the company, he finds himself becoming more mature. He also becomes the lover of several beautiful women, including a Dutchman's mistress, a cokek dancer, and a woman (Tuti Indra Malaon) who owns a store in his village. However, he is betrayed by his friend, Runtu (N. Riantiarno). After being arrested by the Dutch and later released, he continues stealing horses. However, when caught again, he is fatally shot by his father, who had been unaware that the horse thief was his own son.

== Production ==
Teguh Karya directed Wadjah Seorang Laki-laki which, at the same time, was his first feature film. He also wrote the screenplay. Before this, he had acted in several films, been a cinematographer for Wim Umboh's film Sembilan (1967), and directed several serials.

Karya involved numerous actors from his theatre group, Teater Populer. There were hardly many stage actors in Indonesian cinema at the time. Rahardjo, who was a member of Teater Populer, made his film debut as Amallo; Karya later recalled that his acting in the film was stiff. The singer, Laila Sari, received a minor role as one of Rahardjo's love interests. In filming a sex scene between the two, they used a pillow to separate their bodies.

== Style ==
The shooting style of Wadjah Seorang Laki-laki was influenced by Karya's work in theatre. The film's review in Tempo magazine noted that this showed in the use of short dialogue and minimal use of long shots.

== Release and reception ==
Wadjah Seorang Laki-laki was released in 1971. It was a commercial flop, which resulted in critics writing that producers should approach Karya if they wanted a film to fail. Afterwards, Karya spent over a year reading through the criticism and examining the film for shortcomings. His next film, 1973's Cinta Pertama (First Love), won five Citra Awards at the 1973 Indonesian Film Festival and was a commercial success. Rahardjo found himself becoming more outgoing in his roles, to avoid the criticism he received in Wadjah Seorang Laki-laki.

Most contemporary reviews were highly negative. The Tempo review decried the film, including its shots, and its writing; the reviewer noted that the film did not show the same unity that Teater Populer's stageplays did, and at times unfolded unsurprisingly. But the same reviewer did find it enjoyable to watch.

Later reviews were more positive. In a 1999 write-up in the Cinemaya Journal of Asian cinema survey, directors Marselli Sumarno and Nan Achnas described Wadjah Seorang Laki-laki as one of the ten best Indonesian films of all time. Karya reportedly later considered it one of his favourite works.

Wadjah Seorang Laki-laki has been licensed internationally to Between Three Worlds Video. The film has been shown with English subtitles by the Australian company SBS Television under the title Ballad of a Young Man.
