= Nico Pelamonia =

Indonesian actor and director (1940-2017)

- Born: 16 March 1940; Ambon, Maluku, Dutch East Indies
- Died: 15 May 2017 (aged 77); Cipanas, West Java, Indonesia
- Awards: Citra Award for Best Director

Nico Pelamonia (16 March 1940 – 15 May 2017) was an Indonesian actor turned film director who won the Citra Award for Best Director in 1976 for his film Semalam di Malaysia. He has been involved in 33 feature film productions since his debut in Fred Young's Dibalik Awan in 1963.

== Biography ==
Pelamonia was born in Ambon, Maluku, on 16 March 1940. His parents intended for him to become a priest, and after senior high school he sent to Java to prepare for it. In 1962, however, Pelamonia enrolled at the Indonesian National Theater Academy (Akademi Teater Nasional Indonesia, or ATNI). He had his first film role, a bit part in Fred Young's Dibalik Awan (Behind the Clouds), the following year. During his school years he acted in two films, D. Djajakusuma's Masa Topan dan Badai (Time of Storms and Gales; 1963) and Pitrajaya Burnama's Karma (1965). He was also involved in television, becoming a presenter for the newly established TVRI.

In 1965 Pelamonia dropped out of ATNI and signed with Pertisa Film, later known as Tuti Mutia Film Production. Pelamonia's first film for the company, Fadjar Ditengah Kabut (Dawn Amidst the Fog), saw him act and serve as assistant director to Danu Umbara. The following year Pelamonia made his directorial debut with Sendja di Jakarta (Twilight in Jakarta), an adaptation of the novel of the same name by Mochtar Lubis. Two years later he departed for West Germany, where he studied filmmaking.

Upon his return to Indonesia in 1970, Pelamonia resumed acting. He took a role in Hasmanan's Samiun dan Dasima (Samiun and Dasima) in 1970. The following year he directed his first film since returning from West Germany, Jang Djatuh Dikaki Lelaki (Those Who Fall at the Feet of Men) from the novel by Abdullah Harahap. He directed a further four films for Tuti Mutia, acting in several of them. This culminated with Semalam di Malaysia (One Night in Malaysia) in 1975. After the film garnered him a Citra Award for Best Director at the 1976 Indonesian Film Festival, Pelamonia left Tuti Mutia and began working as a freelancer.

Between 1976 and 1988 Pelamonia directed another 13 films, mostly romances. His 1981 adaptation of Marga T's Dr. Karmila garnered him another Citra Award nomination, although he lost to Arifin C. Noer of Serangan Fajar (Attack at Dawn). Pelamonia has also acted in a further ten films, including Nagabonar in 1986; the film was submitted for an Academy Award for Best Foreign Language Film, although it was not nominated. During the 1980s he was active as a member of the Indonesian Film Festival selection committee and Chairman of Film and Television Employees Association.

== Filmography ==
=== As actor ===
- Dibalik Awan (1963)
- Masa Topan dan Badai (1963)
- Karma (1965)
- Fadjar Ditengah Kabut (1966)
- Sendja di Djakarta (1967)
- Hidup, Tjinta dan Air Mata (1970)
- Samiun dan Dasima (1970)
- Anjing-Anjing Geladak (1972)
- Laki-Laki Pilihan (1973)
- Tragedi Tante Sex (1976)
- Si Doel Anak Modern (1976)
- Pengalaman Pertama (1977)
- Yoan (1977)
- Istriku Sayang Istriku Malang (1977)
- Ombaknya Laut Mabuknya Cinta (1978)
- Musang Berjanggut (1983)
- Penyesalan Seumur Hidup (1986)
- Nagabonar (1986)
- Akibat Kanker Payudara (1987)
- Nagabonar Jadi 2 (2007)

=== As crew ===
- Sendja di Djakarta (1967)
- Jang Djatuh Dikaki Lelaki (1971)
- Anjing-Anjing Geladak (1972)
- Laki-Laki Pilihan (1973)
- Prahara (Betinanya Seorang Perempuan) (1974)
- Semalam di Malaysia (1975)
- Wajah Tiga Perempuan (1976)
- Marina (1977)
- Anggrek Merah (1977)
- Yoan (1977)
- Perempuan Tanpa Dosa (1978)
- Di Ujung Malam (1979)
- Karena Dia (1979)
- Cantik (1980)
- Permainan Bulan Desember (1980)
- Amalia SH (1981)
- Dr. Karmila (1981)
- Luka Hati Sang Bidadari (1983)
- Kenikmatan (1984)
- Yang Terbelenggu (1984)
- Gema Kampus 66 (1988)

== Works cited ==
- "Dr. Karmila". filmindonesia.or.id (in Indonesian). Konfiden Foundation. Archived from the original on 5 March 2016.
- "Filmografi Nico Pelamonia" [Filmography for Nico Pelamonia]. Filmindonesia.or.id (in Indonesian). Jakarta: Konfiden Foundation. Archived from the original on 12 April 2016.
- "Jang Djatuh Dikaki Lelaki". Filmindonesia.or.id (in Indonesian). Jakarta: Konfiden Foundation. Archived from the original on 29 June 2015.
- "Nico Pelamonia". Filmindonesia.or.id (in Indonesian). Jakarta: Konfiden Foundation. Archived from the original on 17 April 2014.
- "Nico Pelamonia". Encyclopedia of Jakarta (in Indonesian). Jakarta: Jakarta City Government.
- "Nico Pelamonia" (in Indonesian). Taman Ismail Marzuki. Archived from the original on 14 May 2008.
- "Penghargaan Serangan Fajar" [Awards for Serangan Fajar]. filmindonesia.or.id (in Indonesian). Jakarta: Konfidan Foundation. Archived from the original on 31 August 2014.
- Widjaya, Yan (22 November 2007). "Upaya Indonesia Mencari Peluang" [Indonesia's Looking for a Chance]. Suara Pembaruan (in Indonesian). Archived from the original on 12 March 2008.
