= Sardono Waluyo Kusumo =

- Born: Sardono Waluyo Kusumo; March 6, 1945 (age 81); Surakarta
- Occupations: choreographer, dancer, film director, actor

Sardono Waluyo Kusumo (born March 6, 1945, in Surakarta (also called Solo)), is an Indonesian choreographer, dancer, film director and actor.

He studied classical Javanese dance and specialized afterwards in local dances in combination with modern dance techniques. In 1961 he led a major dance company of 250 dancers at the Hindu temple complex Prambanan, at about 18 km eastwards of Yogyakarta along the road to Surakarta. In the seventies he founded his own theater company, Dance Theatre Sardono.

Next to his dancing career, he also was an actor and film maker. Beside his professional career he is a promoter of the preservation of the rainforests in the country.

== Honours and awards ==
- Bintang Budaya Parama Dharma (Indonesia, 2003)
- Prince Claus Award (Netherlands, 1997)

== Filmography ==
Actor

- 1999: Sri
- 1982: Rembulan dan Matahari
- 1979: November 1828
