= Doea Tanda Mata =

Indonesian cinema poster

Doea Tanda Mata (Mementos, literally "Two Eye Marks") is a 1985 Indonesian war film directed by Teguh Karya.

== Plot ==
The film covers the limited nationalist resistance to Dutch colonial rule in the 1930s. A musician, played by Alex Komang, angered by the political murder of one of his friends, decides to murder a Dutch official. However, on falling in love with the sister (played by Jenny Rachman) of the murdered friend, he begins to wonder if vengeance is the right course.

== Reception ==
Doea Tanda Mata was a great success at the box office in Indonesia, winning a number of Citra Awards (Indonesian Oscars).

== Sources ==
- Heider, Karl G. (1991). Indonesian Cinema: National Culture on Screen. University of Hawaii Press. ISBN 978-0-8248-1367-3.
