= November 1828 =

- Directed by: Teguh Karya
- Screenplay by: Teguh Karya
- Produced by: Njoo Han Siang; Marcella Zalianty; Ronald Lolang; Hendrik G. Gozali
- Starring: Maruli Sitompul; Yenni Rachman; Slamet Rahardjo; Sunarti; El Manik
- Cinematography: Tantra Suryadi
- Edited by: Tantra Suryadi
- Production company: Interstudio
- Release date: 1979
- Running time: 140 minutes
- Country: Indonesia
- Languages: Indonesian, Dutch
- Budget: Rp 240 million

November 1828 is a 1979 Indonesian historical drama directed by Teguh Karya. Production cost an estimated Rp 240 million, making it the most expensive Indonesian movie up to that point. It tells the story of a village struggling against the Dutch colonial military during the Java War, and touches on the themes of nationalism and cultural identity. The movie won 6 Citra Awards.

== Production ==
November 1828 was directed by Teguh Karya, who drew heavily on his theatre troupe Teater Popular Workshop for cast members.

November 1828 uses contrasting shooting styles for each side of the struggle. When depicting the Dutch colonial army, it uses Western-influenced techniques, including Dutch group paintings and the conventions of Western drama. However, when the Javanese revolutionaries are depicted, the filming draws on Javanese traditions or uses techniques "especially developed for the film".

Production cost an estimated Rp 240 million, most of which was spent on producing historically accurate settings and props. At the time, it was the most expensive Indonesian film ever made and twice the cost of a regular production.

== Plot ==
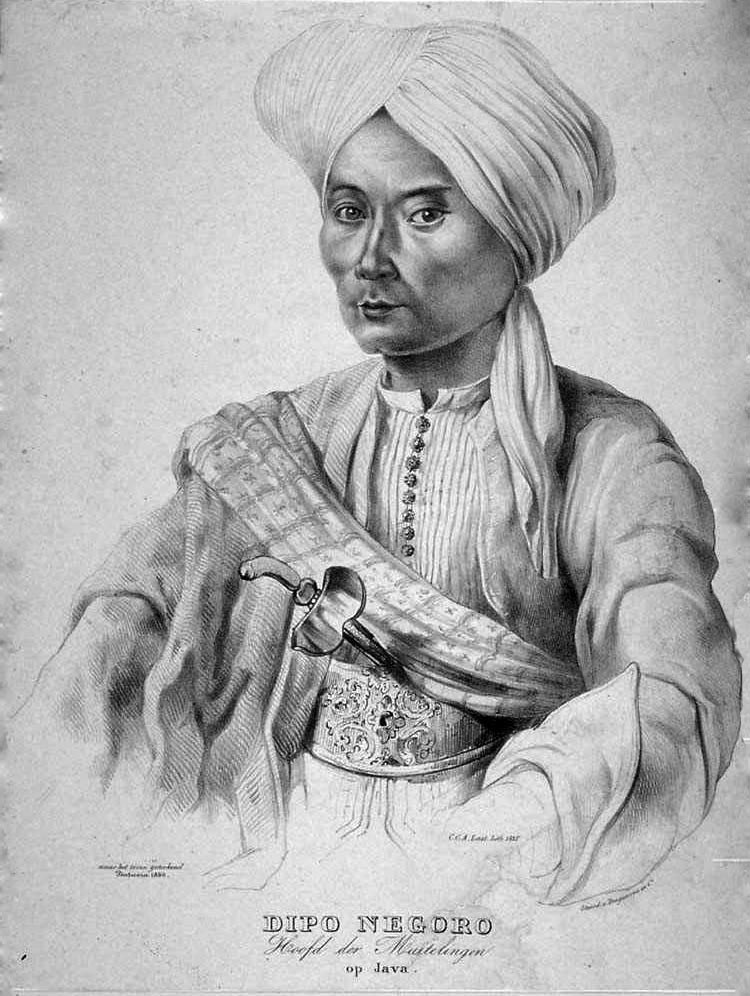
November 1828 was based on the Java war, led by Diponegoro.

During the Java War, when Prince Diponegoro led a general uprising against the Dutch colonial government, the Dutch military occupy a small town in Central Java owing to concerns that they have been collaborating with Sentot Prawirodirdjo, one of the leaders of the Javanese forces. The village chief, Jayengnegoro, accuses elder Kromoludiro of aiding Diponegoro's forces; Kromoludiro is arrested and tortured by Dutch leader Captain de Borst. In response, village kyai Karto Sarjan sends one of his students to find Sentot.

During Kromoludiro's torture, de Borst's second-in-command Lieutenant van Aaken admits that it was he who had informed Diponegoro's forces of the Dutch movements. Enraged, de Borst kills Kromoludiro and arrests van Aaken. Not long afterwards, Sentot's forces enter under the guise of dancers and attack the village from within, confusing the Dutch forces; Sentot himself arrives not long afterwards, defeating the Dutch forces before they can respond effectively. De Borst is slowly killed, while van Aaken dies in the crossfire.

== Themes and symbolism ==
November 1828 has been seen as a "challenging account of cultural differences."

Wanning Sun notes that, seeing as Teguh Karya himself was of mixed foreign (Chinese) and local descent, November 1828 draws numerous parallels with his life, emphasizing the backgrounds of the mixed-race de Borst and van Aaken. He writes that November 1828 is an "indictment of a system that refused full citizenship to those of Chinese descent and simultaneously denied them a place to explore their Chineseness".

Sun also draws on similarities between the liberation of the village and the Indonesian revolution, with representation by the Indonesian military and Islamic figures; both groups played a key role in the revolution.

== Release and reception ==
November 1828 was released in 1979 and advertised as Karya's most patriotic work. It soon became known as a classic. It was also the first Indonesian film to become well known outside of Indonesia, drawing some critical attention. It won 6 Citra Awards, including Best Picture and Best Director.

Deanne Schultz considers November 1828 "a valuable interpretation" of Indonesian colonial history, providing enough background for people with little knowledge of Indonesian history to understand the storyline. She writes that it "embodies the best of popular Indonesian cinema."

Ade Irwansyah of Tabloid Bintang listed November 1828 as the 7th best Indonesian film of all time.
