= My Sky, My Home =

- Directed by: Slamet Rahardjo
- Written by: Slamet Rahardjo
- Release date: 1990
- Running time: 103 minutes
- Country: Indonesia
- Language: Indonesian

My Sky, My Home (Indonesian: Langitku Rumahku) is a 1990 Indonesian drama film directed by Slamet Rahardjo. It was Indonesia's submission to the 63rd Academy Awards for the Academy Award for Best Foreign Language Film, but was not accepted as a nominee.

== See also ==
- Cinema of Indonesia
- List of submissions to the 63rd Academy Awards for Best Foreign Language Film
- List of Indonesian submissions for the Academy Award for Best Foreign Language Film
