= Jakarta Jakarta =

- Directed by: Ami Prijono
- Written by: N Riantiarno; Ami Prijono
- Produced by: Hasrat Djoeir
- Starring: El Manik; Ricca Rachim; Masito Sitorus; Rae Sita; Deddy Sutomo
- Cinematography: Adrian Susanto
- Production company: PT Kamasutra Film
- Release date: 1977
- Running time: 115 minutes
- Country: Indonesia
- Language: Indonesian language

Jakarta Jakarta is a 1977 Indonesian drama film directed by Ami Prijono. The film won five awards at the Indonesian Film Festival in 1978.

== Accolades ==
Award	Year	Category	Recipient	Result
Indonesian Film Festival	1978	Best Feature Film		Won
Indonesian Film Festival	1978	Best Directing	Ami Prijono	Won
Indonesian Film Festival	1978	Best Screenplay	N Riantiarno, Ami Prijono	Won
Indonesian Film Festival	1978	Best Supporting Actor	Masito Sitorus	Won
Indonesian Film Festival	1978	Best Art Direction	Judy Soebroto	Won
