= Alang-Alang (TV series) =

Indonesian TV miniseries

- Genre: Serial drama
- Created by: Teguh Karya
- Country of origin: Indonesia
- Original language: Indonesian
- No. of seasons: 1
- No. of episodes: 3

Production
- Production location: Jakarta

Original release
- Network: SCTV
- Release: December 1994 – December 1994

Alang-Alang (taken from the Indonesian word for blady grass) is an Indonesian three-part television miniseries directed by Teguh Karya and broadcast in December 1994.

== Plot ==
Ipah lives alone with her father, Rengga. The family is very poor and lives in the garbage dumps of Jakarta. Although Ipah wants to go to school, Rengga does not allow her. While Rengga works as a trash scavenger, Ipah takes several jobs and pays for her own schooling, helped by neighbours. Eventually Rengga relents, allowing Ipah to finish her schooling, and she goes on to become a teacher.

== Production ==
Alang-Alang was directed by Teguh Karya, a multi-award winning filmmaker known for his films with social messages. It was sponsored by the Family Planning Coordination Board (Badan Kependudukan dan Keluarga Berencana Nasional, or BKKBN), and the Johns Hopkins University Population Communication Services (JHU/PCS). These organisations, dedicated towards family planning and welfare, considered the message of education important to their goals. Karya, who had previously worked with the BKKBN on Trilogi Khatulistiwa (The Equatorial Trilogy), adopted several aspects suggested by the Board, including the death of a woman after having too many children. Filming began in July 1994.

== Themes ==
Karya and his sponsors had worked to explicitly make family planning and population the central themes. However, in a follow-up survey by JHU/PCS viewers reported seeing themes of education for women, street children's issues, anti-smoking, and intergenerational discourse. Karya initially described the series as "on a little girl who wants a better future".

== Release and reception ==
Alang-Alang was broadcast in December 1994 on SCTV and viewed by 25-30 per cent of the country's television audience. Initially planned to be shown on the state owned TVRI, it was the first drama with a social message broadcast on SCTV. It sparked several polemics. According to the follow-up survey by JHU/PCS, families used the characters from Alang-Alang to discuss their own situation and relationships. For his role in the series, Zainal Abidin Domba won a Vidia Award for best supporting actor.

Together with the Pakistani series Nijaat, Alang-Alang led to further collaborations between JHU/PCS and filmmakers.
