= Cinta Pertama (1973 film) =

- Poster
- Directed by: Teguh Karya
- Screenplay by: Teguh Karya
- Starring: Christine Hakim; Slamet Rahardjo; N. Riantiarno; El Manik
- Production company: PT Jelajah Film
- Release date: 1973
- Running time: 110 minutes
- Country: Indonesia
- Language: Indonesian

Cinta Pertama (transl. First Love) is a 1973 Indonesian romance film directed by Teguh Karya. Starring Christine Hakim, Slamet Rahardjo, and N. Riantiarno, it tells the story of Ade, a young woman who falls in love with Bastian, an ex-convict, yet is engaged to Johny, who raped Bastian's wife and caused her to be killed in the resulting fight. It was well-received both critically and commercially, garnering five Citra Awards and launching Christine Hakim's career. Tabloid Bintang has listed it as the 19th best Indonesian film of all time.

== Plot ==
Ade (Christine Hakim) and Bastian (Slamet Rahardjo) meet on a train bringing them to Jakarta. Bastian is on his way to a job interview, while Ade and her friends have just returned from a trip out of town. As they talk, they realize that Bastian's interview is at Ade's father's company. They soon develop romantic feelings for each other. However, Ade has unwillingly been promised in marriage to Johny (N. Riantiarno), the son of her father's business partner.

Bastian is hired, but soon afterwards someone claiming to be his father-in-law comes and says that Bastian had killed his child. Then soon after that Bastian disappears, leaving behind a letter for Ade saying that he has returned to his hometown to help his stepparents with their flower garden.

One day, Ade is out with Johny when she meets Bastian, who is delivering flowers. Bastian and Johny fight, with Bastian claiming that Johny had raped his wife; when Bastian tried to stop him, he accidentally killed her. Ade returns to Bastian and they are married. Johny later attempts to kill Bastian, only to be foiled and killed himself.

== Production ==
Cinta Pertama was directed by Teguh Karya. He chose then 16-year-old Christine Hakim for the lead role of Ade after he spotted her modeling in a teen magazine. Despite not wanting to act, Hakim was afraid to be impolite to the endearing Karya and did not refuse. She later described it as being "reeled in, slowly, slowly, like [by] a fisherman". The casting of Hakim did not sit well with the producer, who considered her too thin and her chest too small. Karya defended his choice, replying "Are we selling a film or are we selling breasts?"

== Release and reception ==
Cinta Pertama was released in 1973 to critical and commercial success. Christine Hakim won a Citra Award for Best Leading Actress, while Karya won one for directing. It also went second place for Best Film and won Best Cinematography and Best Music. The awards convinced Hakim to stay in acting, eventually making it her primary profession.

In 2010, Ade Irwansyah of Tabloid Bintang listed Cinta Pertama as the 19th best Indonesian film of all time, while another writer, El Masrur Sahlan, noted that Hakim and Rahardjo's on-screen chemistry was some of the best in the business, contributing to their future appearances together. The following year, Irwansyah wrote that Cinta Pertama had the 12th best Indonesian film poster of all time.
