= Teguh Karya =

Indonesian film director (1937–2001)

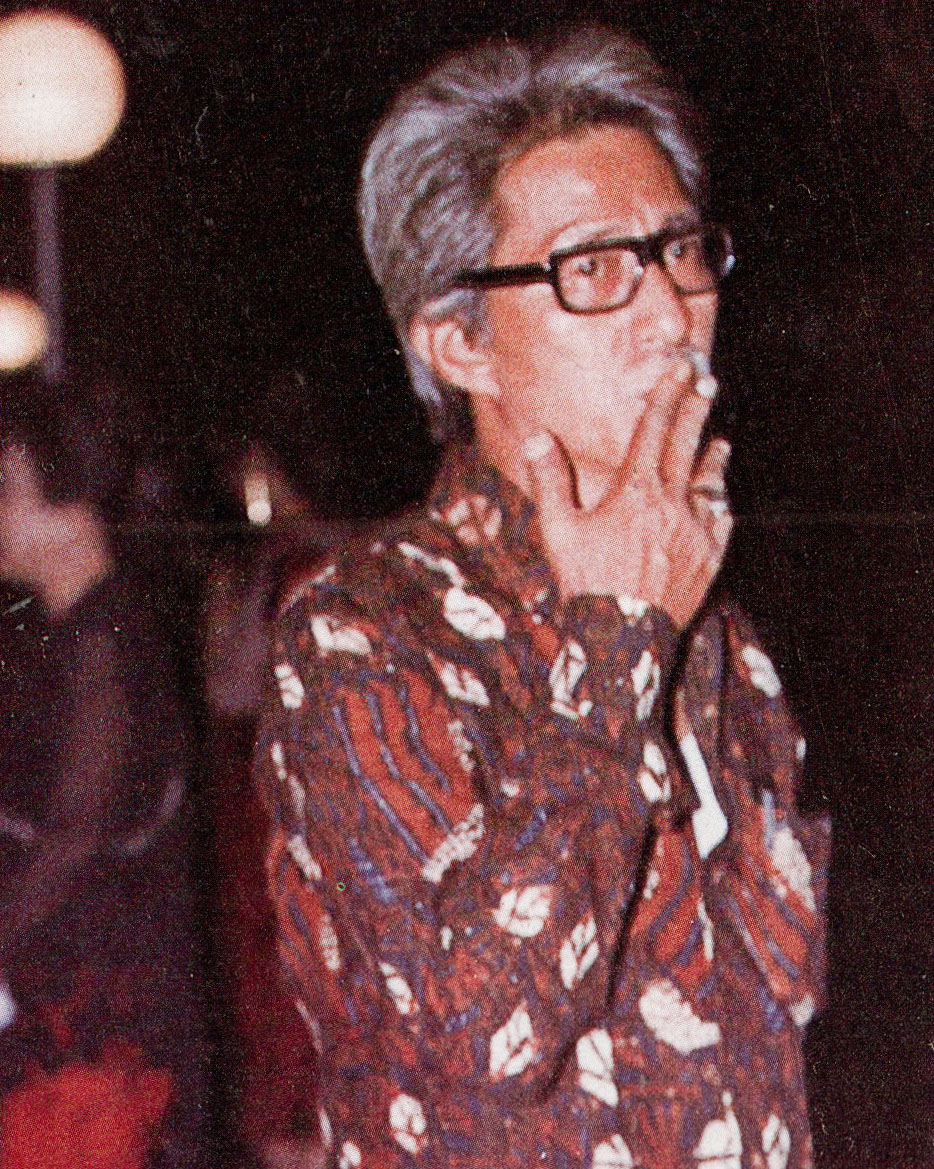
- Karya at the 1982 Indonesian Film Festival
- Born: Steve Liem Tjoan Hok; 22 September 1937; Pandeglang, Banten, Dutch East Indies (modern-day Indonesia)
- Died: 11 December 2001 (aged 64); Jakarta, Indonesia
- Education: Akademi Seni Drama dan Film (1954–1955); Akademi Teater Nasional Indonesia (1957–1961); East–West Center (1962–1963)
- Occupations: Director, actor
- Years active: 1968–1998
- Notable work: Cinta Pertama; Badai Pasti Berlalu; November 1828
- Style: Realism
- Awards: Numerous Citra Awards

Teguh Karya (born Steve Liem Tjoan Hok; Chinese: 林廉鹤; 22 September 1937 – 11 December 2001) was an Indonesian film director. Starting his entertainment career in theatre, he made his directorial debut in 1971 with Wadjah Seorang Laki-Laki in which he also wrote the screenplay. He later directed numerous critically acclaimed films, including Cinta Pertama, Badai Pasti Berlalu, and November 1828. In 2001, Karya died from complications from a 1998 stroke.

== Biography ==
Teguh Karya was born Steve Liem Tjoan Hok on 22 September 1937 in Pandeglang, Banten. He was the first child of Chinese Indonesians Laksana Karya (Tjon Hok) and Naomi Yahya; there was some Bantenese descent from his grandmother. He attended elementary school in Pandeglang, and then moved to Jakarta for junior high school, where he struggled with the exact sciences but did well in the creative arts and history.

Karya studied at the Academy of Film and Dramatic Arts (Indonesian: Akademi Seni Drama dan Film) in Yogyakarta from 1954 to 1955. He then studied at the Indonesian National Theater Academy (Indonesian: Akademi Teater Nasional Indonesia, or ATNI) in Jakarta from 1957 to 1961, where he obtained experience as an actor. He later studied at the East–West Center in Honolulu, Hawaii from 1962 to 1963.

Karya acted in Jenderal Kancil (General Deer Mouse; 1968), while working at Hotel Indonesia as a stage manager. It was directed at children. That same year he established Teater Populer at his home in Kebon Kacang, Tanah Abang, Jakarta. Members were mainly ATNI students; he often booked them to perform at Hotel Indonesia. The troupe later went on to produce critically acclaimed dramas, including 1971's Pernikahan Darah (Blood Marriage), 1973's Inspektur Jenderal, Kopral Woyzeck (Inspector General, Corporal Woyzeck), and 1974's Perempuan Pilihan Dewa (Woman Chosen by the Gods).

In 1971, Karya released his first adult-oriented film, Wadjah Seorang Laki-Laki (The Face of a Boy). Two years later he released Cinta Pertama (First Love), which garnered him his first Citra Award and launched the acting career of its star, Christine Hakim. It was followed by three more romances, Ranjang Pengantin (Wedding Bed), Kawin Lari (Elope), and Perkawinan Semusim (A Season's Marriage).

Karya's most commercially successful work, Badai Pasti Berlalu (The Storm Will Surely Pass), was released in 1977. Based on a novel of the same name by Marga T, it was watched by 212,551 people in its original run. It later won four awards at the 1977 Indonesian Film Festival.

Two years later, Teguh directed the historical epic November 1828, which received six Citra Awards. It was followed by Di Balik Kelambu (Behind the Screen), Secangkir Kopi Pahit (A Cup of Bitter Coffee), Doea Tanda Mata (Two Eye Marks), Ibunda (Mother) and Pacar Ketinggalan Kereta (Lover Left Behind by the Train).

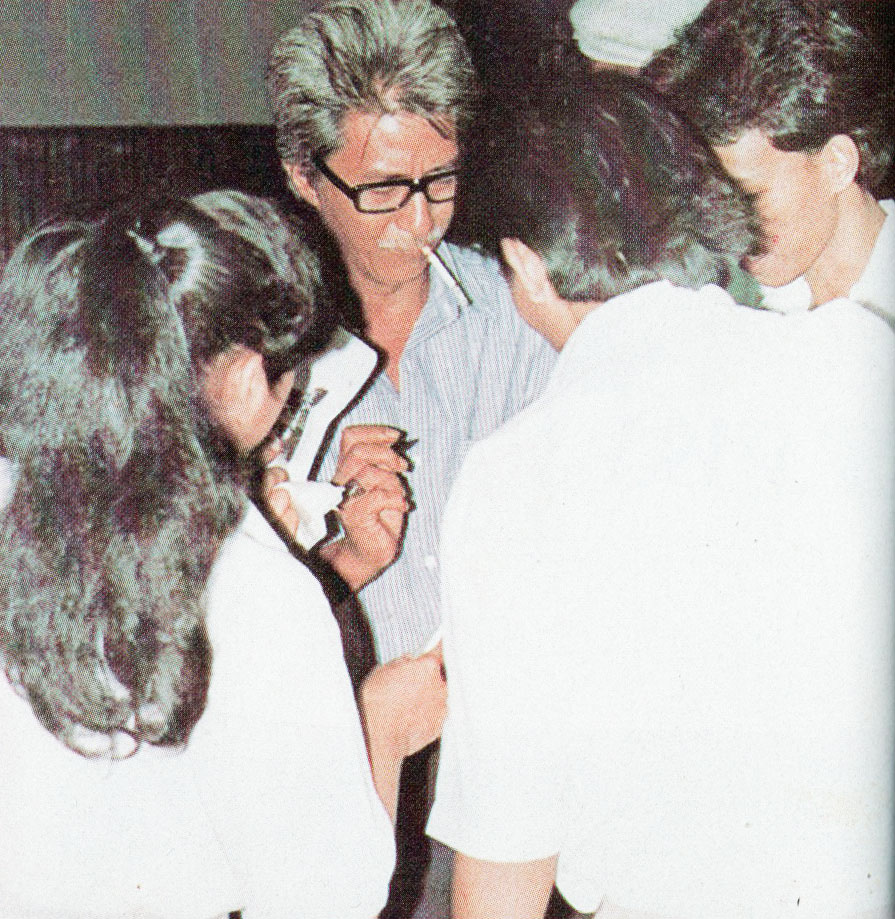
Karya signing an autograph at the 1982 Indonesian Film Festival.

Karya also directed sinetron, or Indonesian soap operas. He released his first sinetron, Pulang (Go Home) in 1987. In 1995 he directed Alang-Alang, sponsored by the Family Planning Coordination Board (Badan Kependudukan dan Keluarga Berencana), and the Johns Hopkins University Population Communication Services.

In 1998, Karya suffered from a stroke, which caused some memory loss and put him in a wheelchair for the rest of his life. He died at the age of 64 at the Mintoharjo Navy Hospital in Central Jakarta on 11 December 2001.

== Influences ==
Karya's work was influenced by numerous directors and stage managers, including Asrul Sani, D. Djajakusuma, and Usmar Ismail.

== Legacy ==
Karya won numerous (described by The Jakarta Post as "countless") Citra Awards.

In 2005, the Twilite Orchestra held a memorial concert featuring songs from Karya's films. Performers included people he had directed, such as Berlian Hutauruk, as well as pop stars like Krisdayanti and Ruth Sahanaya.

== Personal life ==
Karya never married, although he occasionally dated. When asked why, he said that there everyone had "rooms" in them, for art, friends, country, and other things; the order these rooms were filled was different for each person.

== Filmography ==
Year	Title	Notes
1971	Wadjah Seorang Laki-Laki (Face of a Man)	Directorial debut
1973	Cinta Pertama (First Love)	
1974	Ranjang Pengantin (Wedding Bed)	
1975	Kawin Lari (Elope)	
1977	Perkawinan Semusim (A Season's Wedding)	
1977	Badai Pasti Berlalu (The Storm Will Surely Pass)	
1979	November 1828	
1983	Di Balik Kelambu (Behind the Screen)	
1983	Secangkir Kopi Pahit (A Cup of Bitter Coffee)	
1984	Doea Tanda Mata (Two Eye Marks)	
1986	Ibunda (Mother)	
1989	Pacar Ketinggalan Kereta (Lover Left Behind by the Train)	Last feature film

== Nomination and awards ==
Awards	Year	Category	Nomination work	Result	Ref.
Festival Film Indonesia	1974	Best Director	Cinta Pertama	Won	
Festival Film Indonesia	1975	Best Director	Ranjang Pengantin	Won	
Festival Film Indonesia	1979	Best Director	November 1828	Won	
Festival Film Indonesia	1979	Best Original Screenplay	November 1828	Nominated	
Festival Film Indonesia	1981	Best Director	Usia 18	Nominated	
Festival Film Indonesia	1981	Best Original Screenplay	Usia 18	Nominated	
Festival Film Indonesia	1983	Best Director	Di Balik Kelambu	Won	
Festival Film Indonesia	1983	Best Original Screenplay	Di Balik Kelambu	Won	
Festival Film Indonesia	1985	Best Director	Doea Tanda Mata	Nominated	
Festival Film Indonesia	1985	Best Original Screenplay	Doea Tanda Mata	Nominated	
Festival Film Indonesia	1985	Best Director	Secangkir Kopi Pahit	Nominated	
Festival Film Indonesia	1985	Best Original Screenplay	Secangkir Kopi Pahit	Nominated	
Festival Film Indonesia	1986	Best Director	Ibunda	Won	
Festival Film Indonesia	1986	Best Original Screenplay	Ibunda	Won	
Festival Film Indonesia	1989	Best Director	Pacar Ketinggalan Kereta	Won	
Festival Film Indonesia	1989	Best Original Screenplay	Pacar Ketinggalan Kereta	Nominated	
