= Christine Hakim =

Indonesian actress (born 1956)

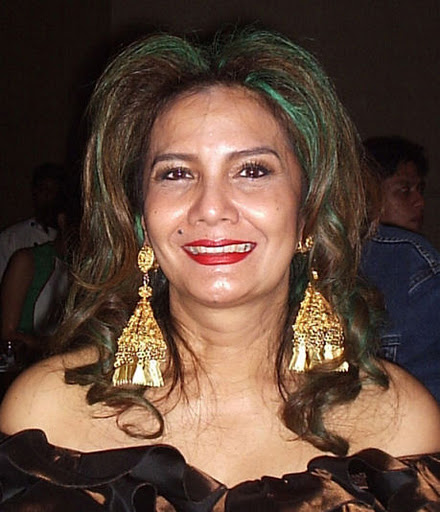
- Hakim in 2012
- Born: Herlina Christine Natalia Hakim; 25 December 1956 (age 69); Kuala Tungkal, Jambi, Indonesia
- Occupations: Actress; film producer; activist
- Years active: 1973–present
- Notable work: Cinta Pertama; Badai Pasti Berlalu; Eat Pray Love
- Spouse: Jeroen Lezer (m. 2000)
- Children: 1
- Awards: 11 Citra Awards

Herlina Christine Natalia Hakim (born 25 December 1956) is an Indonesian actress, film producer and activist. Born to a devout Muslim family of mixed-race background in Jambi, she grew up in Yogyakarta, aspiring to be an architect or psychologist. This changed after she was discovered by Teguh Karya for his 1973 movie Cinta Pertama, a role which garnered her a Citra Award for Best Actress and convinced her to follow a career in acting. Since then, she has starred in numerous films, including 1977's Badai Pasti Berlalu and 1988's Tjoet Nja' Dhien; she also had a minor role in the 2010 Hollywood movie Eat Pray Love. As of 2011, she has won six Citra Awards, received a lifetime achievement award from the Cinemanila International Film Festival, and served as a member of the jury at the Cannes Film Festival.

Hakim began branching out from acting in 1998, beginning with roles as producer of Daun di Atas Bantal and Pasir Berbisik and eventually spreading to documentary filmmaking and being an activist for education and autism. Beginning in 2008, she has served as Indonesia's goodwill ambassador to UNESCO, focusing on educational issues.

== Early life ==
Hakim was born on 25 December 1956 in Kuala Tungkal, Jambi, and was raised in Yogyakarta, as the daughter of Oma Nurhadiaty and Hakim Thahar. She is of mixed descent, with her relatives coming from Padang, Aceh, Banten, Pekalongan, Madiun, and the Middle East; this caused her to question her identity as a child and teenager. Despite being devout Muslims, her parents named her Christine and Natalia because she was born on the Christmas Day. In September 2023, Hakim revealed that her given name was after a German missionary physician who helped her mother give birth to her in a remote area of Jambi.

== Career ==
=== 1973–2000 ===
Originally, Hakim did not intend to be an actress, but an architect or psychologist. However, she was cast in Teguh Karya's 1973 film Cinta Pertama after he saw pictures of her modelling in a magazine; despite only modelling to help her friend and not wanting to act, she was unable to decline Karya's request for fear of being impolite to such a "warm and friendly" person. She later described Karya as having "reeled [her] in, slowly, slowly, like a fisherman," and considered leaving acting after wrapping up filming. Her work in Cinta Pertama garnered her a Citra Award for Best Actress, which convinced her to continue acting. Karya later told her that he had fought with his producer over her casting; the producer expressed concern that Hakim was "too thin and had no chest," to which Karya replied "are we selling a film or are we selling breasts?"

The following year, Hakim starred in another Karya-directed film, Kawin Lari (Elope). The experience gave her a greater understanding of acting, causing her to "see life from a different perspective in studying [her] character." It was followed by a role in 1976's Sesuatu yang Indah (Something Beautiful), directed by Wim Umboh. Sesuatu yang Indah was the first film in which Hakim used her own voice; previously, her voice had been dubbed by Titi Qadarsih in previous movies; Hakim's own voice had been considered "too heavy." The next year, she starred in Badai Pasti Berlalu, appearing on the poster and the cover of the soundtrack album.

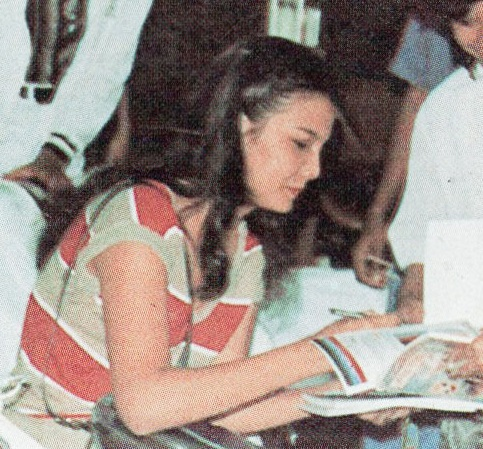
Hakim signing autographs at the 1982 Indonesian Film Festival

Hakim presented 14 Indonesian films at the Nantes Three Continents Festival in November 1983; she had acted in half of them. Two years later she became an observer at the Cannes Film Festival, striking up a working relationship with Pierre Risient, who later assisted her in bringing her films to Cannes.

One of these was Eros Djarot's 1988 film Tjoet Nja' Dhien, in which Hakim was cast as Acehnese guerilla leader Cut Nyak Dhien. It won the 1989 Cannes Film Festival award for Best International Film, being screened in Le Semaine de Critique. Hakim later described the role as a "huge honour" and "very challenging"; she has credited the role for answering her questions on her identity. The film later became Indonesia's submission to the 62nd Academy Awards for the Academy Award for Best Foreign Language Film.

Hakim screened her first work as a producer, Daun di Atas Bantal (Leaf on a Pillow) during Un Certain Regard at Cannes ten years later. When producing the film, she chose young director Garin Nugroho, whom she perceived to be highly talented; she also took the leading role. During production, she made a mistake that required the reshooting of all footage. In an attempt to cut expenses, she had saved all cans of exposed film to send to the developing lab at once; the lab then notified her that a technical fault with the camera had rendered all of it unusable and that the problem could have been detected earlier had she sent each can as it was filmed.

=== 2000–present ===
Another production, 2001's Pasir Berbisik (Whispering Sands), went more smoothly. The film, which Hakim co-produced and played the leading role, was screened at the Deauville Asian Film Festival. The following year she was appointed to the jury of the Cannes Film Festival, along with Michelle Yeoh. In 2005 she received a special tribute during the opening ceremony of the 7th Deauville Asian Film Festival.

In 2003, Hakim began to work with RCTI and Metro TV on the TV show Untukmu Guru (For You, Teacher). Five years later, Hakim was selected Indonesia's voluntary goodwill ambassador for UNESCO; she has used the position to promote education, push for education reforms in Indonesia, and promote disaster relief programs in South-East Asia.

Hakim's first Hollywood experience came in 2010, Hakim played Wayan, a Balinese jamu seller, alongside Julia Roberts in Eat Pray Love. Arriving in Bali three days before shooting, she found herself rushed to read the script, be fitted, and rid herself of her green hair. She met with the person her character was based on to prepare for her role. That same year, Hakim accepted a FIAPF Award for her "outstanding achievements"; she compared the award to Viagra, saying that it "make[s] [her] stronger to satisfy [audiences]".

Hakim is also a documentary filmmaker. She has made a documentary on the Indonesian UNESCO World Heritage Sites, and in 2011 produced a documentary on autism to "educate the public" that was released to coincide with World Autism Awareness Day. As of May 2011, she is producing a documentary on the Dayak people of Kalimantan. She is considering making a fiction film based on their culture.

In 2020, Hakim won the Citra Award for Best Supporting Actress for her role in Joko Anwar's horror film Impetigore. The film is the first horror film of Hakim's career.

In 2023, Hakim was cast in the HBO post-apocalyptic series The Last of Us as a Jakarta-based mycologist, during which she flew to Canada to perform her scenes amid the COVID-19 pandemic in 2021.

In 2026, she appeared in drama film My Mother directed by Eddie Cahyono, in titular role of mother. The film will have its world premiere at the Busan in October.

== Activism ==
Beginning in the early 2000s, Hakim became an activist, with a focus on education. After the 2004 Indian Ocean earthquake and tsunami, she went on numerous humanitarian trips to Aceh. She later founded the Christine Hakim feature, a foundation to promote public education about autism. She has urged the government to eliminate misconceptions regarding autism, calling the refusal to accept autistic students in public schools "a violation of human rights".

== Personal life ==
In 2000, Hakim married Dutchman Jeroen Lezer, an actor, film sales director and writer. They live in Cibubur, East Jakarta, with Hakim's mother and daughter Shena.

== Legacy ==
Hakim has been described as the "grande dame of Indonesian cinema" as well as "Indonesia's foremost actress". She has also received a lifetime achievement award at the Cinemanila International Film Festival. Hakim has refused a position on the Asia Pacific Screen Awards numerous times, due to being unable to reconcile her schedule with the awards.

== Works cited ==
Bibliography

- Ginting, Asrat; et al. (2009). Musisiku [My Musician] (in Indonesian). Jakarta: Republika. ISBN 978-979-1102-52-0. OCLC 227000099.
- Siapno, Jacqueline Aquino (2006). Gender, Islam, nationalism and the state of Aceh. London: Routledge-Curzon. ISBN 978-0-7007-1513-8.

Online sources

- Amburadul; Darsono, Budiono; Doni, Putu (18 November 1989). "Pacar ketinggalan citra". Tempo Interaktif (in Indonesian). Archived from the original on 3 March 2016.
- Emond, Bruce (13 July 2003). "Christine Hakim sets her priorities". The Jakarta Post. Archived from the original on 5 March 2016.
- Emond, Bruce (24 March 2011). "Consistently Christine". The Jakarta Post. Archived from the original on 14 October 2013.
- "Hakim takes to the dance floor with the Dayak". The Jakarta Post. 26 May 2011.
- Helmi, Kunang (3 April 2005). "Christine Hakim at the Deauville Asian Film Festival". The Jakarta Post. Archived from the original on 5 March 2016.
- Helmi, Kunang (22 October 2010). "Christine Hakim: The importance of education". The Jakarta Post.
- Sabarini, Prodita (13 April 2011). "A beautiful mind". The Jakarta Post.
- Webb, Cynthia (19 November 2010). "Christine Hakim: Actress honored at APSA 2010". The Jakarta Post.
- Webb, Cynthia (8 December 2010). "Christine Hakim: Going where life leads her". The Jakarta Post.
