= 2007 Indonesian Movie Awards =

Film industry award ceremony

1st Annual Indonesian Movie Awards
- Date: December 15, 2007
- Location: Tennis Indoor Senayan, Central Jakarta
- Country: Indonesia
- Hosted by: Nirina Zubir; Luna Maya; Aming; Ringgo Agus Rahman

Television/radio coverage
- Network: RCTI

The 1st Annual Indonesian Movie Awards was held on December 15, 2007, at the Plenary Hall, Jakarta Convention Center, Central Jakarta, is the first year of implementation of Indonesian Movie Awards. The award show was hosted by Nirina Zubir, Luna Maya, Aming, and Ringgo Agus Rahman. And the nominations have been announced in the category of Favorite, which will be chosen by the public via SMS. The category of Best, will be selected by a jury that has been appointed.

The national films were registered from January 2005 to February 2007. Until the registration is closed, appeared 48 films of various genres. In total there are 16 categories contested. This category was divided into 8 best nominations of the jury selection and best 8 nominations of the viewers selection.

Berbagi Suami into a film with the most nominations this year's award, with eleven nominations. Mendadak Dangdut and Detik Terakhir follow behind, with the receiving of nine and seven nominations. Even get more than ten nominations, Berbagi Suami failed to win any of the awards. Mendadak Dangdut be biggest winner in this first award, taking home six trophies at once, followed by D'Bijis and Denias, Senandung Di Atas Awan behind with receiving two trophies each. While other films receiving one award each.

== Nominees and winners ==
=== Best ===
Winners are listed first and highlighted in boldface.

Best Actor	Best Actress
**Nicholas Saputra – Janji Joni**; El Manik – Berbagi Suami; Fauzi Baadilla – Tentang Dia; Tora Sudiro – D'Bijis; Winky Wiryawan – Ruang	**Cornelia Agatha – Detik Terakhir**; Jajang C. Noer – Berbagi Suami; Luna Maya – Ruang; Nirina Zubir – Mirror; Rachel Maryam – Anne Van Jogja
Best Supporting Actor	Best Supporting Actress
**Gary Iskak – D'Bijis**; Gito Rollies – Janji Joni; Indra Birowo – D'Bijis; Lukman Sardi – Gie; Slamet Raharjo – Ruang	**Kinaryosih – Mendadak Dangdut**; Adinia Wirasti – Tentang Dia; Rachel Maryam – Janji Joni; Ria Irawan – Berbagi Suami; Rima Melati – Ungu Violet
Best Newcomer Actor	Best Newcomer Actress
**Albert Fakdawer – Denias, Senandung di Atas Awan**; Dwi Sasono – Mendadak Dangdut; Ringgo Agus Rahman – Jomblo; Rizky Hanggono – Ungu Violet	**Sigi Wimala – Tentang Dia**; Djenar Maesa Ayu – Koper; Dominique Agisca Diyose – Berbagi Suami; Raihaanun – Badai Pasti Beralu; Sausan Machari – Detik Terakhir
Best Chemistry	Special Award: Best Singer Actor/Actress
**Titi Kamal and Kinaryosih – Mendadak Dangdut**; Cornelia Agatha and Sausan Machari – Detik Terakhir; Jajang C. Noer and Winky Wiryawan – Berbagi Suami; Rima Melati and Dian Sastrowardoyo – Ungu Violet	**Titi Kamal – Mendadak Dangdut**; Ayu Ratna – Garasi; Delon Thamrin – Vina Bilang Cinta; Kristina – Panggung Pinggir Kali; Slamet Rahardjo – Badai Pasti Berlalu

=== Favorite ===
Winners are listed first and highlighted in boldface.

Favorite Actor	Favorite Actress
**Tora Sudiro – D'Bijis**; El Manik – Berbagi Suami; Fauzi Baadilla – Tentang Dia; Nicholas Saputra – Janji Joni; Winky Wiryawan – Ruang	**Nirina Zubir – Mirror**; Cornelia Agatha – Detik Terakhir; Jajang C. Noer – Berbagi Suami; Luna Maya – Ruang; Rachel Maryam – Anne Van Jogja
Favorite Supporting Actor	Favorite Supporting Actress
**Dwi Sasono – Mendadak Dangdut**; Gito Rollies – Janji Joni; Indra Birowo – D'Bijis; Lukman Sardi – Gie; Slamet Rahardjo – Ruang	**Kinaryosih – Mendadak Dangdut**; Adinia Wirasti – Tentang Dia; Rachel Maryam – Janji Joni; Ria Irawan – Berbagi Suami; Rima Melati – Ungu Violet
Favorite Soundtrack	Favorite Chemistry
**"My Heart" performed by Acha Septriasa & Irwansyah – Heart**; "Cinta Pertama (Sunny)" performed by Bunga Citra Lestari – Cinta Pertama; "Dealova" performed by Once – Dealova; "Jablai (Jarang Dibelai)" performed by Titi Kamal – Mendadak Dangdut; "Tak Bisakah" performed by Peterpan – Alexandria	**Titi Kamal and Kinaryosih – Mendadak Dangdut**; Cornelia Agatha and Sausan Machari – Detik Terakhir; Jajang C. Noer and Winky Wiryawan – Berbagi Suami; Rima Melati and Dian Sastrowardoyo – Ungu Violet
Favorite Newcomer	Favorite Film
**Ringgo Agus Rahman – Jomblo**; Albert Fakdawer – Denias, Senandung Di Atas Awan; Djenar Maesa Ayu – Koper; Dominique Agisca Diyose – Berbagi Suami; Dwi Sasono – Mendadak Dangdut; Raihaanun – Badai Pasti Berlalu; Rizky Hanggono – Ungu Violet; Sausan Machari – Detik Terakhir; Sigi Wimala – Tentang Dia	**Denias, Senandung Di Atas Awan**; Badai Pasti Berlalu; Berbagi Suami; Detik Terakhir; Gie; Janji Joni; Jomblo; Mendadak Dangdut; Mirror; Ruang

== Film with most nominations and awards ==
=== Most nominations ===
The following film received most nominations:

Nominations	Film
11	Berbagi Suami
9	Mendadak Dangdut
7	Detik Terakhir
6	Janji Joni
6	Tentang Dia
6	Ruang
5	Ungu Violet
4	Badai Pasti Berlalu
4	D'Bijis
3	Mirror
3	Gie
3	Denias, Senandung Di Atas Awan
3	Jomblo
2	Koper

=== Most wins ===
The following film received most nominations:

Awards	Film
6	Mendadak Dangdut
2	D'Bijis
2	Denias, Senandung Di Atas Awan
