= Andri Cung =

Chinese Indonesian producer and director

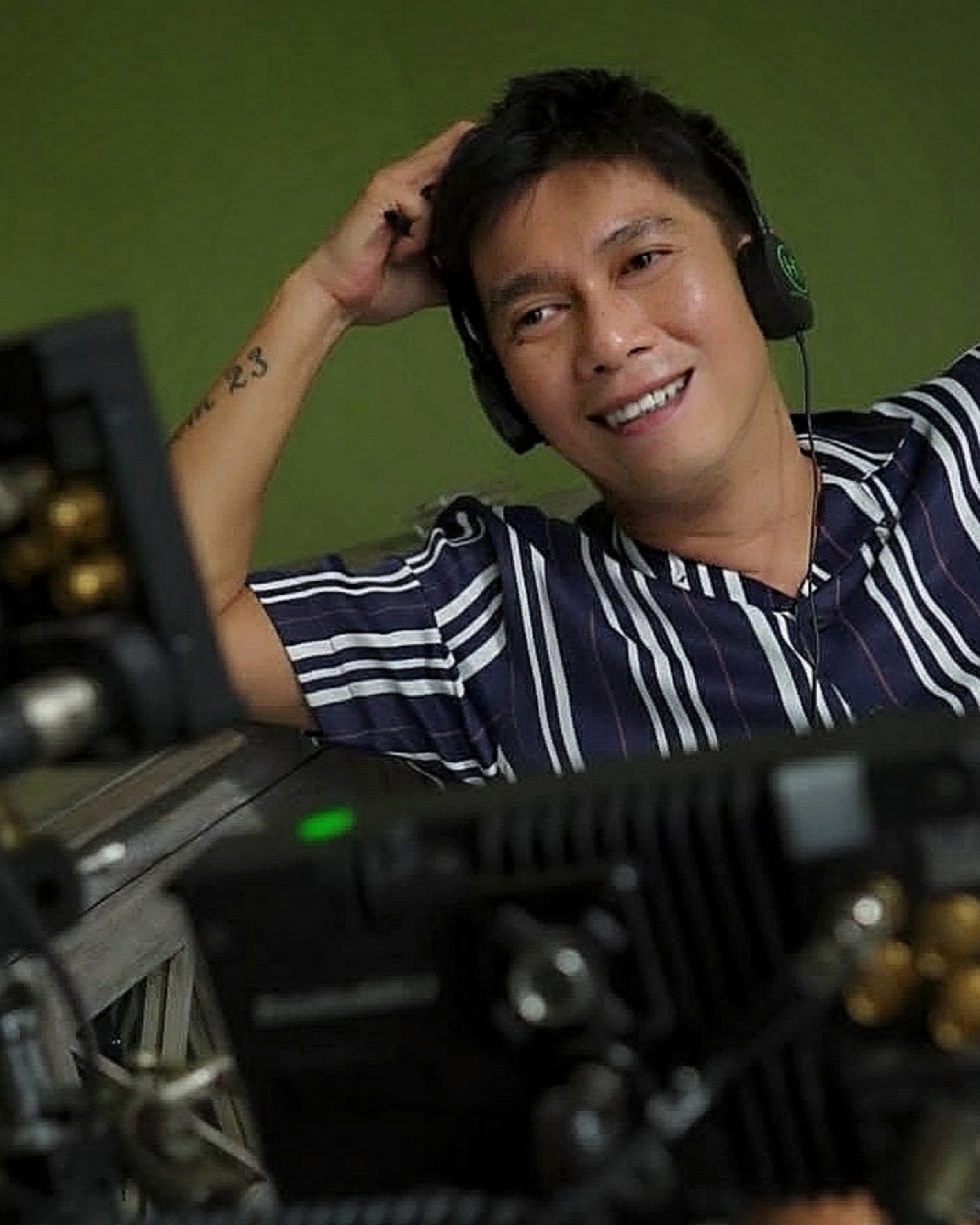
- Born: May 29, 1982 (age 44); Indonesia
- Occupations: Producer, Director
- Years active: 2010–present
- Notable work: Red Umbrella, Merindu Mantan, Rawa Kucing, Ugly Stupid Love

Andri Cung (born 29 May 1982) is a Chinese-Indonesian producer and director.

== Personal life ==
Parts of the Heart depicts aspects of Cung's life as a gay man, though he has stated that he had no problem coming out to his personal circle. He also noted that he is working to feel comfortable with his sexuality due to social stigma and pressure in Indonesia.

== Career ==
Cung began directing in 2010 with the short film Red Umbrella, which earned him a nomination for the Best Short Movie Award Screen Singapore, an international short film festival. He then directed Merindu Mantan, a horror slasher film that screened at Europe On Screen, an Indonesian Film Festival, in 2011. In 2013, he directed Rawa Kucing, a romance short film that was part of the omnibus film 3Sum, alongside works by William Chandra and Witra Asliga.

In 2014, he directed his first full-length feature film as a sole director. The film earned him a nomination for Best Original and Adaptation Screenwriter at Piala Maya, an Indonesian film festival. The same year, he was also nominated for Best new director at the Vancouver International Film Festival.

After a four-years hiatus, he returned as both director and screenwriter for Ugly Stupid Love (2018), which won the Best Film for 21 years old and above award from the Anugerah Lembaga Sensor Film, an Indonesian award ceremony held by the Film Censorship Board. That year, he also directed his first television series, Halustik, in collaboration with Lucky Kuswandi and Nia Dinata.

In 2020, he directed episodes 7 through 9 of Gossip Girl Indonesia for GoPlay, an Indonesian over-the-top streaming service. Two years after, he directed two television series: My New Rules of Journey, which as produced as sole director using only a Samsung Galaxy S22 camera, and Suka Duka Berduka, co-directed with Nia Dinata for Vidio, an Indonesian video streaming platform.
