= Ugly Stupid Love =

Indonesian romantic comedy film

- Kenapa Harus Bule?
- Directed by: Andri Cung
- Written by: Andri Cung
- Produced by: Nia Dinata; Kyo Hayanto
- Starring: Putri Ayudya
- Production company: Viu
- Release date: March 22, 2018
- Country: Indonesia
- Language: Indonesian

Ugly Stupid Love (Indonesian: Kenapa Harus Bule?) is an Indonesian romantic comedy-drama film written and directed by Andri Cung, with Nia Dinata and Kyo Hayanto as producers. The film was released in theaters on March 22, 2018, and stars Putri Ayudya, Natalius Chendana, and Cornelio Sunny.

== Plot ==
Pipin Kartika is fixated on marrying a "bule"—an Indonesian term for a foreigner, especially for white people. As she approaches 30, her dream man remains elusive. Frustrated by a string of encounters with "jerk bule" in Jakarta, Pipin decides to move to Bali in pursuit of love. With the help of her friend Arik, Pipin meets Buyung, a man of mixed heritage. Pipin is initially attracted, but her interest wanes when she discovers Buyung is actually her childhood friend in disguise. She then tries her luck with Gianfranco , an Italian man, and quickly falls for him. However, her hopes are dashed when Gianfranco turns out to be a liar. Left single, with dwindling savings and no foreign boyfriend, Pipin is haunted by the fear of becoming an old maid.

== Production ==
The film's production took place in Bali. The idea for the film originated from a social phenomenon prevalent among Indonesian women who do not conform to the country's beauty standards, which often favor lighter skin, leading some to pursue relationships with foreigners.The film is original movie that was producted by VIU, Hongkong Streaming Service who is expanding in Indonesia. This film also put LGBT character which was starred by Michael Kho.

== Cast ==
- Putri Ayudya as Pipin Kartika
- Paul Agusta as Pablo
- Michael Kho as Arik
- Cornelio Sunny as Gianfranco Battaglia
- Chicco Kurniawan as teenage Buyung
- Natalius Chendana as Ben/Buyung

== Reception ==
Based on a review from CNN Indonesia, the film takes on feminist and many social themes, though the plot is quite cliché.On the other hand, The Jakarta Post offered a review that the film was entertaining and conveyed a strong message about challenging beauty standards.The film won award for The Best Film for 21 years old and above award from Anugerah Lembaga Sensor Film, an Indonesian award ceremony held by the Film Censorship Board.
