= Mariana Renata =

Indonesian model

- Born: Mariana Renata Dantec; December 31, 1983 (age 42); Paris, France
- Education: Paris-Sorbonne University; University of New South Wales (MCom)
- Occupations: Celebrity, model
- Years active: 1997–present
- Modeling information
- Hair color: Brown
- Eye color: Brown
- Agency: Wilhelmina Models; Innovative Artists

Mariana Renata Dantec (born 31 December 1983, Paris), also known as Mariana Renata and Mariana Dantec, is a French-Indonesian model and actress. She is best known for her roles in the films Janji Joni (2005), The Matchmaker (2006), and Nic and Mar series (2015).

== Early life and education ==
Born to a French father and an Indonesian mother, Mariana Renata started her modeling career at the age of 13 in Jakarta, Indonesia.

She obtained an undergraduate degree in English Culture and Literature from the Paris-Sorbonne University and her Master of Commerce at the University of New South Wales in International Business.

== Career ==
In her modeling career, Renata has walked on the Paris, Sydney, Milan and New York fashion runways, and has become a model for numerous global brands.

She has also appeared in several music videos. In 2003, she was featured in the Asian-market version of Josh Groban's "She's Out of My Life" and Indonesian-market version of Filipino band Rivermaya's "Balisong" music videos.

The following year, she was chosen as the new brand ambassador for Lux.

In 2005, Renata landed her first film, taking a supporting role in Joko Anwar's romantic comedy Janji Joni. The film was screened at the 2005 Tokyo International Film Festival. She won "Most Favorite Supporting Actress" at the MTV Indonesia Movie Awards for her performance.

Renata next appeared in a cameo role in the 2006 television series Dunia Tanpa Koma. That same year, she took her first lead role as an eclectic girl who tries to pair off her best friend with a bookshop owner in the short film The Matchmaker, directed by Cinzia Puspita Rini and produced by Nia Dinata. The film had its international premiere at the 11th Busan International Film Festival in the Asian Shorts division.

Renata then took a break from acting to finish her master's degree at the University of New South Wales. After she graduated in 2010, she settled in Australia and traveled to Central American countries for a year.

Since 2011, she has lived in New York City, where she is represented by Wilhelmina Models and Innovative Artists modeling agencies.

Renata reunited with co-star Nicholas Saputra eight years after Janji Joni, in the South Korean-Indonesian joint production film Someone's Wife in the Boat of Someone's Husband; the film was a part of Jeonju International Film Festival's Jeonju Digital Project. It was also screened at the 2013 Locarno Film Festival.

In January 2014, Renata was a guest judge on Asia's Next Top Model Season 2, where she was also introduced as the face of TRESemmé for South-east Asia region. The following year, Renata for the third time acted opposite Nicholas Saputra in LINE's web series Nic and Mar. A story about rekindled lovers, it was released in March 2015 and aired weekly on Thursday and Friday through the Line Story official account.

In 2016, Renata participated in the International Labour Organization's campaign in promoting voluntary counselling and HIV testing for workers. She joined other artists and athletes around the world in the ILO's “Voice of the Voiceless” initiative to give voice to people living with HIV/AIDS who are not able to tell their own stories. In the campaign video, Renata lent her voice for the real-life story of Yohana, a plantation worker from Indonesia who found out she was HIV positive after getting tested at work. Renata's participation in this initiative was pro-bono. She noted, "Many people living with HIV have no access to information and to care as well as treatment. Even in many countries they lose their rights to employment".

== Personal life ==
Renata is the only child in her family. Her cousin, Renata Kusmanto, is a model and actress. Their mothers are twins. Her cousin-in-law, Fachri Albar, is an actor. Dantec speaks fluent Indonesian, English and French.

From 2005 to 2006, Renata was romantically linked to Janji Joni co-star Nicholas Saputra.

== Filmography ==
=== Film ===
Year	Title	Role	Director	Note
2005	Janji Joni	Angelique	Joko Anwar	
2006	The Matchmaker	Kay	Nia Dinata	Short film
2013	Someone's Wife in the Boat of Someone’s Husband	Halimah	Edwin	South Korean-Indonesian joint production; Jeonju Digital Project
2015	Nic and Mar	Mar		7 episodes, web series

=== TV series ===
Year	Title	Role	Network	Note
2006	Dunia Tanpa Koma		RCTI	Cameo

=== Reality shows ===
Year	Title	Role	Note	Ref.
2014	Asia's Next Top Model (season 2)	Guest judge	Episode 11	
2016	Voice of the Voiceless	Yohana	ILO campaign	

=== Music videos ===
Year	Title	Artist
1998	"Dua Sedjoli"	Dewa 19
1998	"Setia"	Chrisye
2004	"She's Out of My Life" (Asia version)	Josh Groban
2005	"Menunggumu"	Peterpan
2006	"Cinta Yang Lain"	Ungu ft. Chrisye
2007	"Balisong"	Rivermaya
2010	"Mengagumimu"	Malika

== Awards and nominations ==
Year	Award	Category	Nominated work	Result	Ref.
2005	MTV Indonesia Movie Awards	Most Favorite Supporting Actress	Janji Joni	Won	
