= Arisan! 2 =

2011 Indonesian comedy drama film

Arisan! 2 (English: The Gathering 2) is a 2011 Indonesian comedy drama film directed by Nia Dinata. The story was sequel of Arisan! and television series with the same name.

== Synopsis ==
Eight years after the events of Arisan!, the main characters—Sakti, Meimei, Andien, Sakti's formerly betrothed cousin Lita, and Sakti's partner, Nino—have gone through pivotal life events. Andien has been widowed, Meimei is divorced, and Lita has rejected the institution of marriage in favor of single motherhood. Sakti and Nino have also separated. As they age, the pressures of Jakarta's high society drive them to pursue perfection. This pursuit is stimulated by the arrival of a plastic surgeon, Dr. Joy, and her financier, Ara (Atiqah Hasiholan). Their social circle has also been joined by Yayuk Asmara (Ria Irawan), a writer who transitions from being a critic of their group to writing their biographies, and Octa (Rio Dewanto), a notably attractive young man.

== Production ==
For this film, Nia served as the sole screenwriter and producer. The inspiration came from the life journey she experienced as her life went on, combined with questions from the cast about when a sequel would be made. The production taken place in Gili Island.

=== LGBT story in the film ===
The film give more representation of the LGBT by making more relationship between two gay couple with age gap. They also introduced lesbian character though it doesn't take big screen time in the film.

== Cast ==
- Cut Mini as Meimei, a sick and divorcee
- Tora Sudiro as Nino, gay friend that has relationship with older married man
- Aida Nurmala as Andien, a widowed woman
- Surya Saputra as Nino, an ex boyfriend of Surya who has relationship with Octa
- Adinia Wirasti as Molly, a bartender who became best friend for Meimei
- Edward Gunawan as Tom, spiritual healer
- Sarah Sechan as Joy, a plastic surgery doctor
- Rio Dewanto as Okta, boyfriend of Nino
- Atiqah Hasiholan as Ara, financier of Joy
- Rachel maryam as Lita, ex betrothed fiance of Sakti
- Pong Hardjatmo as Gerry, current boyfriend of Sakti
