= Suka Duka Berduka =

2022 Indonesian film

Suka Duka Berduka is an Indonesian black comedy television series directed by Andri Cung and Nia Dinata and written by Agasyah Karim, Khalid Kashogi and Nia Dinata. It has eight episodes and was screened in Vidio in 2022.

== Synopsis ==
The film tells the story of Rauf Affan's family after his sudden death from a heart attack. His body found by his current wife. The family gathers for his funeral and traditional mourning ceremonies on the third, seventh, and fortieth days, as well as to discuss their inheritance. Each family member seeks a larger share, especially his youngest child. As the only male heir, he will receive a greater share than his sisters under Islamic law. Meanwhile, the son is struggling to hide his homosexuality.

== Cast ==
- Jihane Almira as Naumi
- Ersa Mayori as Mitha
- Luna Maya as Ela
- Tora Sudiro as Paul
- Oka Antara as Rasyid
- Atiqah Hasiholan as Lilis
- Samudra Taylor as Vano
- Krisjiana Baharuddin as Ipung
- Anyun Cadel as Alaimin
- Mbok Tun as Sukiyah
- Natalius Chendana as Tama
- Jajang C. Noer as Grandmother
- Ayushita as Yayuk
- Nala Amrytha as Putri
- Shalom Razade as Tisha/Tisa
- Gia Partawinata as Omar
- Melissa Karim as Lisa Wijaya
- Imam Wahyudi as Anwar Hadoko
- Shafira Umm as Cora
- Rizal Iwan as Peter
- Nazyra C. Noer as Nunies
- Otto Djauhari as Lord Lukito
- Putri Sarah Amelia as Sister Hera
- Lukman Syah as Rauf Affan
- Dimitri Hariastuti as Indri Tanubraja
- Andri Cung as Dr. Goh
- Aida Nurmala as printing worker

== Production ==
It was created as an original television series for Vidio and premiered on July 7, 2022. It was a collaborative production between Rapi Films and Kalyana Shira Films. Its 8 episode were released weekely. It featured Oka Antara as a closeted gay person.

== Reception ==
According to a review by Magdalene, the review said that the series feels close to the reality by avoiding an antagonist trope.
