= Sastha Sunu =

Indonesian film editor

- Born: 2 February 1963 (age 63); Jakarta, Indonesia
- Education: Jakarta Institute of Arts
- Occupation: Film Editor
- Years active: 2001 -
- Known for: Film Editor

Sastha Sunu is a noted Indonesian film editor who has worked on several of Indonesia's most prominent films since 2001. In 2002 he edited the film Ca-bau-kan and in 2005 Gie.

== Filmography ==
- Ca Bau Kan (2001)
- Sebuah Pertanyaan untuk Cinta (2002)
- Eliana, Eliana (2002)
- Rumah Ketujuh (2003)
- Untukmu (2003)
- Eiffel I'm in Love (2003)
- Eiffel I'm in Love Extended Version (2004)
- Mengejar Matahari (2004)
- Impian Kemarau atau "The Rainmaker" (2004)
- Tentang Dia (2005)
- Ungu Violet (2005)
- Vina Bilang Cinta (2005) -- supervisor editor
- Gie (2005)
- Untuk Rena (2005)
- Apa Artinya Cinta? (2005)
- Long Road to Heaven (2007)
- D'Bijis (2007)
- 3 Hari Untuk Selamanya (2007)
- Anak-Anak Borobudur (2007)
- The Photograph (2007)
- Merah Itu Cinta (2007)
- Legenda Sundel Bolong (2007)
- Ayat-Ayat Cinta (2008)
- Drop Out (2008)
- 3 Doa 3 Cinta (film) (2008)
- Jamila dan Sang Presiden (2009)
- Merah Putih (2009)
- Merah Putih 2: Darah Garuda (2010)
- Merah Putih 3: Hati Merdeka (2011)
- Metamorphoblues—The Story of Slank & Slankers (2011)
- Surat Kecil untuk Tuhan (2011)
- Dilema (2012)
- 5 cm (film) (2012)
- Hasduk Berpola (2013)
- Java Heat (2013) -- additional editor
- 308 (2013)
- Moga Bunda Disayang Allah (2013)
- Tenggelamnya Kapal Van der Wijck (film) (2013)
- Tenggelamnya Kapal Van der Wijck (film) Extended Version (2013)
- Sebelum Pagi Terulang Kembali (2014)
- Supernova (2014)
- Jenderal Soedirman (2015)

== External links and sources ==
- Sastha Sunu at IMDb
