= Arisan! =

2003 Indonesian comedy-drama film

The Gathering
- Arisan! film poster
- Arisan!
- Directed by: Nia Dinata
- Written by: Joko Anwar; Nia Dinata
- Produced by: Sari Nirmolo; Dina Ponsen; Nia Dinata; Afi Shamara
- Starring: Cut Mini; Tora Sudiro; Surya Saputra; Aida Nurmala; Rachel Maryam
- Cinematography: Yudi Datau
- Edited by: Dewi S. Alibasah
- Music by: Andi Rianto
- Distributed by: Kalyana Shira Film
- Release date: 10 December 2003
- Running time: 129 minutes
- Country: Indonesia
- Language: Indonesian
- Budget: 2 billion IDR

Arisan! (English: The Gathering) is a 2003 Indonesian comedy-drama film directed by Nia Dinata, who also co-wrote the screenplay with then-unknown Joko Anwar. At the 2004 Indonesian Film Festival, it won the Citra Awards in five major categories: Best Picture, Best Actor, Best Supporting Actor, Best Supporting Actress, and Best Editing. Arisan! was the first Indonesian film to feature two men kissing, portrayed by the characters Sakti (Tora Sudiro) and Nino (Surya Saputra).

In May 2006, a television series based on the film premiered on ANTV. A sequel, Arisan! 2, was released in December 2011, continuing the story after the events in the television series.

== Synopsis ==
A successful architect, Sakti (Tora Sudiro), is uncertain about his sexuality, but when he meets magnetic and gay Nino (Surya Saputra), he realizes he prefers men. When Meimei (Cut Mini), one of Sakti's closest female friends, reveals she's attracted to Nino, it causes complications in their social circle. Weighing whether or not to come out of the closet, Nino is mindful of fragile Meimei, who's dealing with the breakup of her marriage.

== Cast ==
- Cut Mini as Meimei
- Surya Saputra as Nino
- Tora Sudiro as Sakti
- Aida Nurmala as Andien
- Rachel Maryam as Lita
- Lili Harahap as Grace
- Aurora Yahya as Fanny
- Wilza Lubis as Nuri
- Nico Siahaan as Ical
- Tika Panggabean as Massage Therapist
- Jajang C. Noer as Psychiatrist
- Ria Irawan as Yayuk Asmara
- Indra Birowo as Rama
- Joko Anwar as Restaurant Manager

== Production ==
During an interview with The Jakarta Post film critic Joko Anwar, Nia Dinata asked him to co-write a screenplay about a group of friends in urban Jakarta after Anwar impressed her with his filmmaking aspirations. The two co-wrote the screenplay for what would become Arisan! and received a Citra Award nomination for Best Screenplay.

Dian Sastrowardoyo and Nicholas Saputra made an uncredited cameo as a man and a woman in an art gallery scene.

== Reception ==
It is often credited with reviving the Indonesian film industry after a decade of setback along with Ada Apa dengan Cinta? and Petualangan Sherina. At the 2004 Citra Award, the film received 5 awards out of 11 nominations.

Arisan! received much attention for being the first Indonesian film with a gay theme as well as the first Indonesian film to use high-definition color enhancement. It uses a mixture of English, standard Indonesian, and Jakartan urban slang. Upon release, it garnered controversy for its depiction of homosexuality in its home Muslim-majority country of Indonesia.

== Trivia ==
'Arisan' is a common term for a regular social gathering between friends and relatives who chip in money to be won in turns through a lucky draw. From villagers in far-flung areas to urban professionals in big cities, arisan was initially born as a type of support network among Chinese-Indonesian merchants before becoming popular among general Indonesians, particularly housewives. In bigger cities, 'arisan' has also grown into a platform to exhibit wealth with strict criteria for participation.

== Awards and nominations ==
Year	Award	Category	Recipients	Result
2004	24th Citra Awards	Best Picture	Arisan!	Won
2004	24th Citra Awards	Best Director	Nia Dinata	Nominated
2004	24th Citra Awards	Best Actor	Tora Sudiro	Won
2004	24th Citra Awards	Best Supporting Actor	Surya Saputra	Won
2004	24th Citra Awards	Best Supporting Actress	Rachel Maryam	Won
2004	24th Citra Awards	Best Supporting Actress	Aida Nurmala	Nominated
2004	24th Citra Awards	Best Screenplay	Nia Dinata; Joko Anwar	Nominated
2004	24th Citra Awards	Best Editing	Dewi S. Alibasah	Won
2004	24th Citra Awards	Best Original Score	Andi Rianto	Nominated
2004	24th Citra Awards	Best Cinematography	Yudi Datau	Nominated
2004	24th Citra Awards	Best Art Direction	Ary Juwono	Nominated
2004	Bandung Film Festival	Best Film	Arisan!	Won
2004	Bandung Film Festival	Best Director	Nia Dinata	Won
2004	Bandung Film Festival	Best Actor	Tora Sudiro	Nominated
2004	Bandung Film Festival	Best Actor	Surya Saputra	Nominated
2004	Bandung Film Festival	Best Actress	Cut Mini	Nominated
2004	Bandung Film Festival	Best Actress	Aida Nurmala	Nominated
2004	Bandung Film Festival	Best Screenplay	Nia Dinata Joko Anwar	Nominated
2004	MTV Indonesia Movie Awards	Best Movie	Arisan!	Won
2004	MTV Indonesia Movie Awards	Most Favorite Movie	Arisan!	Nominated
2004	MTV Indonesia Movie Awards	Best Director	Nia Dinata	Won
2004	MTV Indonesia Movie Awards	Most Favorite Actor	Tora Sudiro	Nominated
2004	MTV Indonesia Movie Awards	Most Favorite Actress	Cut Mini	Nominated
2004	MTV Indonesia Movie Awards	Most Favorite Supporting Actor	Surya Saputra	Won
2004	MTV Indonesia Movie Awards	Most Favorite Supporting Actress	Rachel Maryam	Nominated
2004	MTV Indonesia Movie Awards	Most Favorite Supporting Actress	Aida Nurmala	Nominated
2004	MTV Indonesia Movie Awards	Best Song in a Movie	"Cinta Terlarang" by Ren Tobing	Nominated
2004	MTV Indonesia Movie Awards	Best Crying Scene	Cut Mini	Nominated

== Sequel ==
A sequel, written and directed by Dinata and featured the same principal cast, titled Arisan! 2, was released in December 2011.
