= Shandy Aulia =

Indonesian actress (born 1987)

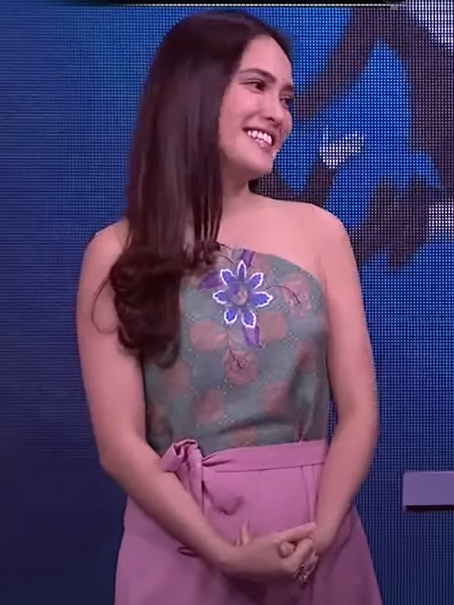
- Born: Nyimas Shandy Aulia; 23 June 1987 (age 38); Jakarta, Indonesia
- Other name: Shandy Aulia
- Occupations: Actress; Model
- Years active: 2002 - present

Nyimas Shandy Aulia or better known as Shandy Aulia (born 23 June 1987) is an Indonesian actress and model of mixed Minahasan, Palembang and Minangkabau descent.

== Early life ==
Shandy Aulia was born in Jakarta on 23 June 1987 as the youngest of four siblings. She was raised in a family environment that emphasised togetherness, mutual respect, and openness from an early age. These early experiences contributed to the development of her character and outlook in both her personal life and professional career.

In the course of her life, Shandy Aulia followed her mother's faith and practices Christianity. This decision was made as part of a personal process that shaped her identity, in line with the family values she had been exposed to since childhood.

Her family background and life experiences during childhood have influenced the principles and perspectives she has maintained into adulthood.

== Career ==
Shandy Aulia is an Indonesian actress who has been active in the film and television industry. Throughout her career, she has appeared in various feature films as well as television series and soap operas produced nationally. Her involvement in these projects reflects her continued participation in acting and her contribution to the Indonesian entertainment industry.

== Filmography ==
=== Film ===
| Year | Title | Role | Notes |
|---|---|---|---|
| 2003 | Eiffel I'm in Love | Tita | Lead role Nominated – 2004 MTV Indonesia Movie Awards for Best Crying Scene; Nominated – 2004 MTV Indonesia Movie Awards for Most Favorite Actress |
| 2004 | Eiffel I'm in Love Extended | Tita | Lead role |
| 2005 | Apa Artinya Cinta? | Aliza | Lead role |
| 2008 | Chika | Costume Designer | Cameo appearances |
| 2012 | Rumah Kentang | Farah | Lead role |
| 2013 | 308 | Naya | Lead role |
| 2013 | Moga Bunda Disayang Allah | Kinasih | Lead role |
| 2014 | Mall Klender | Mila | Lead role |
| 2014 | Rumah Gurita | Selina | Lead role |
| 2015 | Tarot | Julie/Sofia | Lead role |
| 2016 | The Doll | Anya | Lead role |
| 2018 | Eiffel I'm in Love 2 | Tita | Lead Role |
| 2018 | Rasuk | Langgir Janaka | Lead Role |
| 2019 | Perjanjian dengan Iblis | Anisa | Lead Role |
| 2019 | Kutuk | Maya | Also as a producer and scriptwriter |
| 2019 | Cinta Itu Buta | Diah | Lead Role |

=== Television ===
| Year | Title | Role | Notes |
|---|---|---|---|
| 2004 | Pacar Khayalan | Ocha | |
| 2005 | Sepatu Kaca | Raisa | |
| 2007 | Mendadak Kawin | Silla | |
| 2009 | Cinema Valentine | | |
| 2009 | Hareem | Inayah | |
| 2009 | Inayah | Amih Inayah | |
| 2010 | Nurjannah | Nurjannah | |

=== Television film ===
- Cewek Cantik Itu Namanya Sarah (2008)
- Mengejar Cinta Nayla (2008)
- Siapa Bilang Cinta Itu Buta (2009)
- Buaya Pesta (2009)
- Sekotak Pisang Ponti Untuk Cinta (2009)
- Cewek, Maafin Gue Donk (2009)
- He Loves Me, He Loves Me Not (2009)
- Miscall (2009)
- Pacar Gue Sexy Banget (2009)
- Piring Terbang (2009)
- Tabrak Lari (2009)
- Tabrak Lari 2 (2009)
- Asyiknya Jadi Cewek Tajir (2009)

== Book ==
- Incomplete (2014)

== Video Clip ==
| Year | Title | Artist |
|---|---|---|
| 2014 | "Shadows of My Heart" | Saykoji (feat. JayDee) |
| 2015 | "Stranger in My Bed" | Boy William |

== TV commercials ==
| Year | Title | Role | Notes |
|---|---|---|---|
| 2002–2005 | Rexona | Herself | 6 version |
| 2008 | Walls Conello | Herself | |
