= Fauzi Baadilla =

Egyptian-born Indonesian actor and model

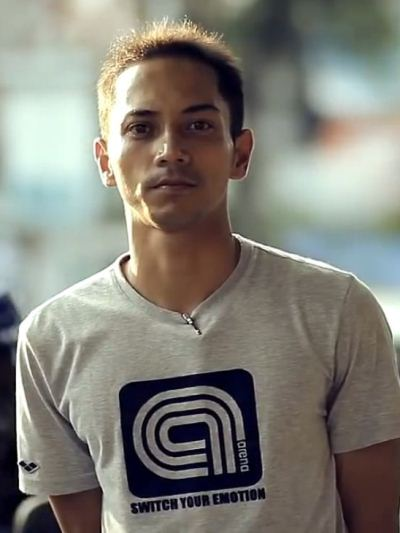
- Fauzi Baadila in 2012
- Born: September 25, 1979 (age 46); Cairo, Egypt
- Other name: Oji
- Occupations: Celebrity, Model, Politician, Presenter

Fauzi Baadilla (born 25 September 1979) is an Egyptian-born Indonesian actor and model. He appeared as Damar in Mengejar Matahari, directed by Rudy Soedjarwo, a role for which he won "Best Supporting Role Actor" at the 2005 Bandung Film Festival.

== Career ==
He began his career in 2000 as a model for advertisements and videos. In 2004, he starred in the movie Mengejar Matahari and since then has starred in 9 Naga, Tentang Dia, Rindu Kami Padamu, Coklat Stroberi and many more. He played very great as lead role in "Lost in Papua" (2011) and "Sebelum Pagi Terulang Kembali" (2014). In the beginning of 2016, he appeared in three Indonesian drama movie : "I Am Hope", "ISENg", and "Dreams".

He has also appeared in soap operas such as Dunia Tanpa Koma and Keajaiban Cinta with Primus Yustisio. He worked in music videos for the singers Shanty and Sania and as a presenter in television programs such as Nikmatnya Dunia, Wisata Malam, and Ride with Pride.

In June 2011, he and Kinaryosih received an invitation from the South Korean national broadcaster, KBS to appear in Let's Go! Dream Team Season 2.

In 2013, he was named as a tourism ambassador for Indonesia.

== Personal life ==
He was married an Uzbekistani model, Senk Lotta, on January 23, 2007. They divorced in 2010. Fauzi Baadillah prefers to keep a low profile in the media. He has been one of activist against Jaringan Islam Liberal and recently become part of Warrior of Hope (activist for raising awareness and care of people with cancer). Currently he has been living in Bogor, West Java. In 2015 he was appointed as brand ambassador for Banda Neira island.

== Filmography ==
=== Film ===
| Year | Title | Role | Notes |
|---|---|---|---|
| 2004 | Mengejar Matahari | Damar | Lead role Won - 2005 Bandung Film Festival for Best Supporting Role Actor; Nominated - 2004 MTV Indonesia Movie Awards for Most Favorite Actor |
| 2004 | Rindu Kami Padamu | Seno | Supporting role |
| 2005 | Tentang Dia | Randu | Supporting role Won - 2005 MTV Indonesia Movie Awards for Most Favorite Supporting Actor; Nominated - 2007 Indonesian Movie Awards for Best Actor; Nominated - 2007 Indonesian Movie Awards for Favorite Actor |
| 2006 | 9 Naga | Lenny | Supporting role Nominated - 2006 MTV Indonesia Movie Awards for Most Favorite Supporting Actor |
| 2006 | Jakarta Undercover | Visitor 1 | Cameo |
| 2007 | Coklat Stroberi | Owner Distribution | Cameo |
| 2008 | Perempuan Punya Cerita | Jay Anwar | Segment: "Cerita Yogyakarta" |
| 2008 | Love | Rama | Segment: "Rama dan Iin" |
| 2008 | Suami-Suami Takut Istri The Movie | Ferdy | |
| 2008 | Takut: Faces of Fear | Andre | Segment: "The List" |
| 2009 | Jamila dan Sang Presiden | Faizal | |
| 2010 | The Sexy City | Vino | |
| 2011 | Lost In Papua | David | Lead role |
| 2013 | Rectoverso: Cinta Yang Tak Terucap | Tano | Segment: "Hanya Isyarat" |
| 2013 | Finding Srimulat | JoLim | Antagonist |
| 2014 | Sebelum Pagi Terulang Kembali | Satria | Lead role |
| 2014 | Mantan Terindah | TBA | Cameo |
| 2015 | Behind 98 | Rahman | |
| 2016 | Iseng | Andi | |
| 2016 | Dreams | Iban | Antagonist |
| 2016 | I Am Hope | Doctor for Mia | |
| 2017 | At Stake | Reporter | Cameo |
| 2018 | The Power of Love | Rahmat | |
| 2019 | Hayya 2: Hope, Dream, & Reality | Rahmat | |
| 2021 | Kukira Kau Rumah | Wisnu | |
| 2025 | Telaga Suriram | Supian | |

=== Television ===
| Year | Title | Role | Notes | Network |
|---|---|---|---|---|
| 2006 | Keajaiban Cinta | Vicky | | Indosiar |
| 2006 | Dunia Tanpa Koma | Bram | | RCTI |
| 2007 | Nikmatnya Dunia | Himself | | SCTV |
| 2011 | Bintang Untuk Baim | Indra | | SCTV |
| 2011 | Ride with Pride | Himself | | ANTV |
| 2011 | Let's Go! Dream Team Season 2 | Himself | Sports variety program | KBS |
| 2011 - 2012 | Wisata Malam | Himself | | Trans 7 |
| 2014 - 2015 | Urban Xtreme Sport | Himself | | Trans 7 |

== Video clip ==
| Year | Title | Singer |
|---|---|---|
| 2004 | "Arti Cinta" | Ari Lasso |
| 2005 | "Menanti Sebuah Jawaban" | Padi |
| 2005 | "Tak Akan Ada Lelaki Seperti Dia" | Shanty |
| 2006 | "Cintai Aku Lagi" | Sania |
| 2006 | "Jalan Cahaya" | ADA Band |
| 2009 | "Tak Gendong" | Mbah Surip |
| 2010 | "Diam-Diam" | Dewi Persik feat. Ahmad Dhani |
