= John O'Hare (actor) =

Australian actor

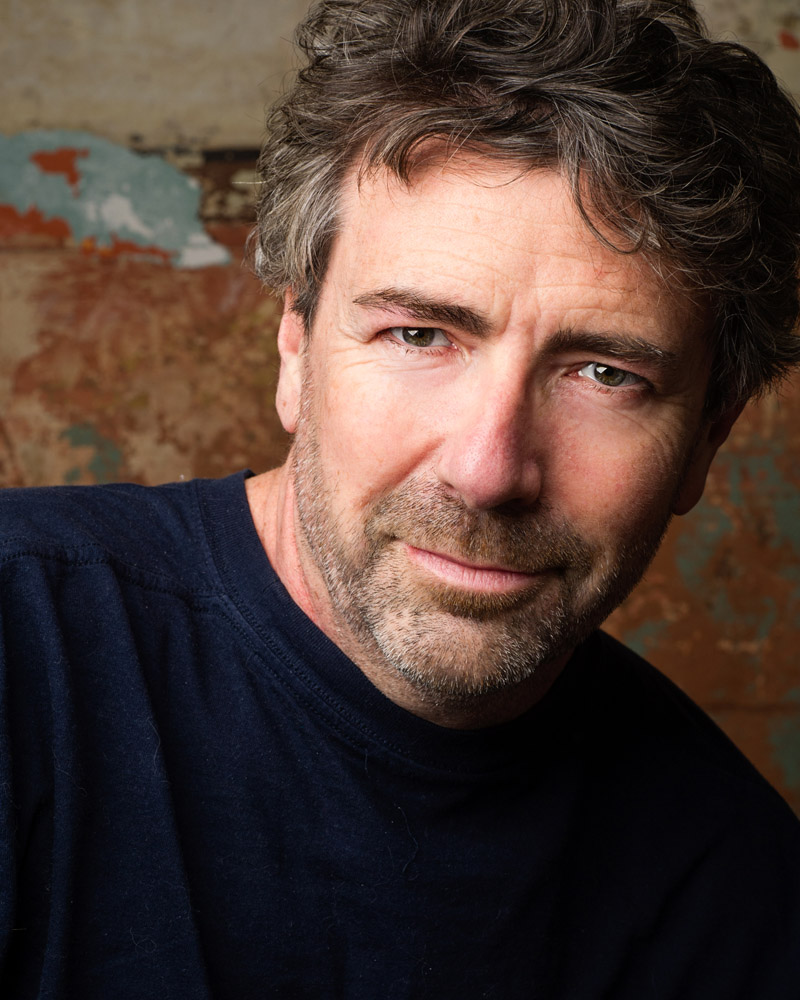
John O'Hare in 2013

John O'Hare is an Australian actor, director and teacher from Sydney, Australia. He works in film, television and theatrical productions and was the Head of Acting at QUT Creative Industries Brisbane in 2000 to 2003 https://www.qut.edu.au/courses/bachelor-of-fine-arts-acting Then was appointed the Artistic Director and Head of Acting at the Actors College of Theatre and Television and Academy of Film Theatre and Television in Sydney. O'Hare is also the co-founder and co artistic director of O'Punksky's Theatre Company.

== Early life and education ==
O'Hare was born in Moston, Manchester in the UK on 14 October 1962 Migrated to Australia in December 1969 educated at Balcatta Senior High School, Perth (1976), the Western Australian Academy of Performing Arts (1988) and then the Queensland University of Technology (2000).

== Filmography ==
=== Film ===
Year	Title	Role	Type
1987	Storm in a Teacup	David	
1989	Child of the Air	Henri	
1990	More Winners: His Master’s Ghost	Mike Nowacek	TV movie
1993	My Son The Fanatic		
1995	Code Blue	Peter	Short film
1996	Safety Man	Man	
1997	Blackrock	Geoff	Feature film
1999	Change of Heart	Director	Feature film
2007	Long Road to Heaven	Tim Dawson	Feature film
2008	Adele	Lover	
2009	JB & the Mule	JB’s Dad	

=== Television ===
Year	Title	Role	Type
1990	G.P.	Jack Moran	TV series, 8 episodes
1991	Heroes II: The Return	Corporal Fletcher	Miniseries, 2 episodes
1992	English at Work	Dr Phillips	
1993	English at Work	Dr Ransom	
1993	A Country Practice	Captain Ron Parker	TV series, 2 episodes
1993	The Leaving of Liverpool	Singlet	Miniseries (2 part)
1996	G.P.	Paul Wallace	TV series, 1 episode
1997-98	Wildside	Rob Summers	TV series, 7 episodes
1994	The Cooks	Juan	TV series, 1 episode
2004	Home and Away	Phillip	TV series
2005	Home and Away	Ted	TV series
2009	Rogue Nation	Chief Justice Francis Forbes	TV series, 1 episode
2009	First Australians	Darwin	Documentary series
2010	Tough Nuts: Australia's Hardest Criminals	Parole Officer	Documentary series
2010	Cops L.A.C.	Matthew	TV series, 1 episode
2012	Packed to the Rafters	Fred Fintsloe	TV series, 1 episode
2019	Home and Away	Carl Simmons	TV series

=== TV Commercials ===
Year	Title	Type
2002	Baileys Irish Cream	
2006	NRMA	
2007	eBay	Jungle ads
2008 & 2009	Woolworths	Christmas campaign

== Theatre ==
Year	Title	Role	Type
1985	Queen and the Rebels	Raim	Chimera Perth
1987	Chad	Hot Boy	Comeout Festival
1988	Henry IV Part 1	Douglas	New Fortune Theatre
1988	Northumberland		Festival of Perth
1989	Essington Lewis	Actor	WA Theatre Company
1989	The Plough and the Stars	The Covey	Hole in the Wall
1989	Romeo and Juliet		Hole in the Wall
1989	Major Barbara	Walker, Lomax	National Theatre
1989	Travesties	James Joyce	Hole in the Wall
1990	Observe the Sons of Ulster Marching Towards the Somme	Willy Moore	O’Punksky’s Theatre
1990	Little Malcolm and His Struggle Against the Eunuchs	Erwin Ingham	O’Punksky’s Theatre
1991	Exiles	Richard Rowan	Crossroads Theatre
1992	Much Ado About Nothing	Boracio	STC
1992	The Slab Boys	Spanky Farrell	O’Punksky’s Theatre
1993	Blue Remembered Hills	Donald	O’Punksky’s Theatre
1993	Prelude to Joyce’s Artist	Stephen Dedalus	Thalia Theatre Company
1994	The Cavalcaders	Rory	Queensland Theatre
1995	Arcadia		STC - national tour
1998	The Cripple of Inishmaan	Babbybobby	STC
2000	The Ecstatic Bible	Tread	Brink & Wrestling School
2003	The Cavalcaders	Rory	Ensemble Theatre
2009	Address Unknown	Max	Seymour Centre
2010	The Seafarer	Ivan	Darlinghurst Theatre
