= Andi Rianto =

Indonesian film score composer

- Born: 7 May 1972 (age 54); Sorong, West Irian, Indonesia
- Other name: Andi
- Education: Berklee College of Music
- Occupations: Film score composer, actor
- Years active: 2003–present

Andi Rianto (born May 7, 1972) is an Indonesian film score composer and actor. who has worked on several of Indonesia's most popular films. He's also the leader of the Magenta Orchestra.

In 2002 he worked on Ca-bau-kan and in 2003 he composed for Arisan!. Additionally, in 2009 he worked on the new theme of Seputar Indonesia, the flagship news program on RCTI. Graduated in Berklee College of Music, and became a leader for a band called Magenta Orchestra.

He started with piano lessons at 4 years old. In 1990, when he was in Senior High School, his family moved to the US, and he enrolled at Forest Hills High School in New York. His teachers advised him to continue his education after graduation from high school in music at Berklee.

In 1992 he passed to enter the Berklee College of Music in Boston, Massachusetts, USA, and he took specialization in composition and arrangement. In 1996 he graduated from Berklee with holding an Cum Laude grade.

In 1998 he returned to Indonesia, then he established the Magenta Orchestra and the Deluxe Symphony in Jakarta.

== Filmography ==
- Titik Hitam (2002)
- Biarkan Bintang Menari (2003)
- Arisan! (2003)
- 30 hari mencari cinta (2004)
- Mengejar Matahari (2004)
- Vina Bilang Cinta (2005)
- 9 Naga (2006)
- Jatuh cinta lagi (2006)
- Mendadak Dangdut (2006)
- Kuntilanak (2006)
- Pesan dari Surga (2006)
- Pocong 2 (2006)
- Kangen (2007)
- Pocong 3 (2007)
- Kuntilanak 2 (2007)

== External links and sources ==
- Andi Rianto at IMDb
