= Surya Saputra =

Indonesian actor (born 1975)

- Born: Surya C Saputra; July 5, 1975 (age 51); Jakarta, Indonesia
- Occupations: Celebrity; Model; Singer
- Spouses: Dewi Sandra (2000–2005); Cynthia Lamusu (2008–present)
- Children: Married from Cynthia Lamusu: Ataya Tatjana Aisyah Putri; Atharva Bimasena Saputra
- Parent(s): Eddy Suherman (father); Linda Lolita Husein (mother)
- Relatives: Fiona Saputra (sister)
- Awards: Citra Award for Best Supporting Actor

Surya C Saputra (born 5 July 1975) is an Indonesian actor, singer, and model. He is the husband of Indonesian actress and singer, Cynthia Lamusu. He is also a former member of the Indonesian pop boy group the Cool Colors.

== Career ==
Surya Saputra has appeared in the soap operas Air Mata Ibu, Cerita Cinta, Remaja Lima, Cinta Abadi, Romantika 21, Strawberry, Metropolis 2, Senyuman Ananda, and Arisan! 2 The Series. He has appeared in the films Janji Joni, Gie, Untuk Rena, Arisan!, Belahan Jiwa and Long Road to Heaven, which is about the Bali terrorist bombing. Saputra won "Best Supporting Actor" for his work in Arisan! at the 2004 Indonesian Film Festival.

Surya Saputra has also worked as a film producer. He appeared on the reality show Celebrity Dance teamed up with Cynthia Lamusu. He is also a former member of Surya the boy group Cool Colors, along with Ari Wibowo (replacing Teuku Ryan), Ari Sihasale, and Yohandi Yahya.

On 2 April 2016, Surya Saputra had received a special award, 7 Icon Usmar Ismail Awards, together with a senior Widyawati, Tio Pakusadewo, Dwi Sasono, Lenny Marlina, Sissy Pricillia, and Prisia Nasution at the 2016 Usmar Ismail Awards.

== Personal life ==
Surya Saputra married singer Dewi Sandra in 2000 and they were divorced in January 2005. Surya Saputra married Cynthia Lamusu of the girl group Be3 on 8 June 2008. Surya Saputra and Chyntia Lamusu became parents to baby twins, both girl and boy, which were born on 20 November 2016.

== Filmography ==
=== Film ===
Year	Title	Role	Notes
2003	Arisan!	Nino	Supporting role Won – 2004 Indonesian Film Festival for Best Supporting Actor; Won – 2004 MTV Indonesia Movie Awards for Most Favorite Supporting Actor
2005	Janji Joni	Otto	Supporting role Nominated – 2005 Indonesian Film Festival for Best Supporting Actor
2005	Untuk Rena	Yudha	Lead role Won – 2006 Festival Film Jakarta for Best Male Leading Role
2005	Belahan Jiwa	Dr. Wiranto	Supporting role
2007	Long Road to Heaven	Hambali	Supporting role
2008	Love	Gilang	Supporting role
2008	Ayat-Ayat Cinta	Eqbal	Supporting role
2009	Jamila dan Sang Presiden	Surya	Supporting role
2009	King	Mr. Herman	Supporting role
2009	Meraih Mimpi	Pairot	Dubber
2011	Serdadu Kumbang	Ketut	Supporting role
2011	Ayah, Mengapa Aku Berbeda?	Suryo Syahputro	Lead role
2011	Arisan! 2	Nino	Supporting role Nominated – 2012 Indonesian Movie Awards for Best Chemistry (with Rio Dewanto)
2012	Malaikat Tanpa Sayap	Amir	Supporting role Won – 2012 Festival Film Bandung for Best Male Supporting Role
2012	Modus Anomali	The husband	Supporting role
2012	Jakarta Hati		
2015	Kakak	Adi	Lead role
2015	Ayat-Ayat Adinda	Faisal	Supporting role
2015	Magic Hour	Doctor	Supporting role
2022	Sri Asih	Prayogo Adinegara	

=== Television ===
Year	Title	Role	Notes	Network
1997–1998	Melangkah Di Atas Awan	Yudi	Supporting role	Indosiar
1998	Air Mata Ibu		Lead role	RCTI
1999	Cerita Cinta	Igo	Supporting role	Indosiar
2000	Cinta Abadi			Indosiar
2003	Metropolis 2			RCTI
2004	Romansa 21			Indosiar
2005–2006	Senyuman Ananda	Philip	Lead role	Indosiar
2006	Arisan! The Series	Nino	Supporting role	ANTV
2006	Dunia Tanpa Koma	Jendra Aditya	Supporting role	RCTI
2012	Cinta Bersemi di Putih Abu-Abu The Series	Tony	Supporting role	SCTV
2012–2013	Love in Paris	Arif	Supporting role	SCTV
2013	Cinta Yang Sama	Tirta	Supporting role	SCTV
2013–2014	Diam-Diam Suka	Alex	Supporting role	SCTV
2014–2015	Diam-Diam Suka: Cinta Lama Bersemi Kembali	Alex	Supporting role	SCTV
2015	Cantik-Cantik Magic		Supporting role	SCTV
2015	Elang: The Real Action Season 2	Erick	Supporting role	SCTV
2015	Alphabet	Irfan	Supporting role	SCTV
2016	Aku Jatuh Cinta	Gunawan	Supporting role	SCTV
2016	Super Puber	Risal	Supporting role	SCTV
2017	Keluarga Besar	Anton	Lead role	NET.
2022	Ikatan Cinta	Surya	Lead role	RCTI

=== Television film ===
Year	Title	Role	Notes
2014	3 Butir Kurma		Lead role Won – 2014 Indonesian Film Festival for Best FTV Leading Actor; Nominated – 2014 Festival Film Bandung for Best FTV Male Leading Role
2015	Bapakku Saingan Cintaku		Supporting role

== Awards and nominations ==
Year	Awards	Category	Recipients	Result
2004	MTV Indonesia Movie Awards	Most Favorite Supporting Actor	Arisan!	Won
2004	Indonesian Film Festival	Citra Award for Best Supporting Actor	Arisan!	Won
2005	Indonesian Film Festival	Citra Award for Best Supporting Actor	Janji Joni	Nominated
2006	Jakarta Film Festival	Best Male Leading Role	Untuk Rena	Won
2012	Indonesian Movie Awards	Best Chemistry (with Rio Dewanto)	Arisan! 2	Nominated
2012	Bandung Film Festival	Best Male Supporting Role	Malaikat Tanpa Sayap	Won
2014	Bandung Film Festival	Best FTV Male Leading Role	3 Butir Kurma	Nominated
2014	Indonesian Film Festival	Best FTV Leading Actor	3 Butir Kurma	Won
2016	Usmar Ismail Awards	7 Icon Usmar Ismail Awards	Surya Saputra	Won
