= Indonesian tin mining scandal =

2024 illegal mining corruption scandal

The Indonesian tin mining scandal was a scandal that involved the Indonesian state-owned mining enterprise PT Timah Tbk, which facilitated illegal mining activities in the Bangka Belitung Islands from 2015 to 2022. The environmental damage resulting from the scandal was estimated to have reached US$16.8 billion. It was also the biggest corruption scandal in the nation's history before being overtaken by the Pertamina corruption case in 2025.

== Background ==
The tin mining sector in Bangka Belitung can be traced back to the 7th century, when mining was mainly focused on Bangka Island. When the Dutch East India Company arrived in the city of Palembang, the Palembang Sultanate gave them a monopoly over the access of tin trade in Bangka. When a tin deposit was found in nearby Belitung Island, the Billiton Maatschappij was given the mining rights of the island, which continued beyond Indonesian independence in 1945 and finally ended when the company got seized and nationalized by Sukarno's government.

In 1976, Suharto's New Order government established PT Timah Tbk to exploit the tin deposit in both Bangka and Belitung, which were both was still part of the province of South Sumatra at the time. Illegal tin mining began to thrive in the area after the fall of Suharto in 1998 due to deregulation in the post-Suharto era.

== Events ==
=== Lead-up events ===
According to some witnesses, the concession of tin mining under PT Timah Tbk began in 2015. PT Timah Tbk was said to have relied on illegal mining due to the depleting reserves on its onshore mining activities.

The beginning of the main scheme could be traced to 2018, when two businessmen — Suwito Gunawan (also known as Awi) and Hasan Tjhie (also known as Asin) — made a pact to lend tin smelting equipment to PT Timah Tbk via their companies PT Stanindo Inti Perkasa and CV Venus Inti Perkasa. Other involved parties include Emil Ermindra, the financial director of PT Timah Tbk; Mochtar Riza Pahlevi Tabrani, director of PT Timah Tbk; and MB Gunawan, director of PT Stanindo Inti Perkasa.

In the same year, coal businessman Harvey Moeis, who was then part of the acting delegation of PT Refined Bangka Tin, talked with Tabrani. The communication aimed to accommodate the illegal mining activities in the permitted mining region of PT Timah Tbk in order to make a bigger profit. Both Moeis and Tabrani hid the activities under the guise of leasing the tin smelting equipment. In order to execute the scheme, Moeis coordinated the transaction process and profit sharing of the illegal mine in an account run by his own syndicate.

=== Arrests ===
The case was brought to back to the surface in 2024 when the Attorney General's Office of Indonesia found evidence of illegal mining activities supported by PT Timah Tbk which had been happening since 2018 using the fictional leasing scheme. After the irregularities were discovered, the Attorney General's Office began investigating PT Timah Tbk.

==== Mochtar Riza Pahlevi Tabrani ====
From 2016 to 2024, Tabrani made deals with several businessmen to buy tin from companies that were given mining permits but were under the watch of PT Timah Tbk. In February 2024, the Attorney General's Office named Tabrani as a suspect for the tin mining permit corruption. He was immediately detained. The Attorney General's Office declared that the total loss of the scandal was 300 trillion rupiah (US$18.2 billion), with the total environmental damage amounting to 271 trillion rupiah (US$13.2 billion), the smelter leasing amounting to 2.2 trillion rupiah (US$133.6 million), and the cost of illegal tin costing 26 trillion rupiah (US$1.6 billion).

While the investigation was occurring, Tabrani led PT Timah Tbk briefly. Despite his short stint as the leader, he was responsible for giving permits to companies which were illegally mining — this was regarded as manipulation of commodity trade. Evidence found included irregularities in the production data and financial reports. This was later deemed illegal.

==== Harvey Moeis ====
On 27 March 2024, the Attorney General named Harvey Moeis as a suspect due to his role in PT Refined Bangka Tin, which had contacted Tabrani to make a deal regarding the operation of the illegal smelting facilities. The arrest attracted media attention due to Moeis being the husband of Indonesian actress and singer Sandra Dewi. Moeis was later sent to the South Jakarta Attorney General detention center for 20 days to be investigated.

During the investigation, the Attorney General highlighted Moeis's role as the middleman between PT Refined Bangka Tin and PT Timah Tbk. During the illegal mining operation, Moeis called multiple smelting companies to participate. To launder the money, Moeis used the services of money changer and socialite Helena Lim to hide the trace of irregular transactions. In February 2025, Lim was sentenced to 10 years in prison.

Moeis was sentenced to 6.5 years in prison by the Jakarta Corruption Court. Later, other judges lowered his sentence because of new findings stating that Moeis only helped PT Refined Bangka Tin connect with PT Timah Tbk and did not participate in their crimes. Moeis was also required to pay a 1 billion rupiah fine. Moeis would later appeal to the Jakarta Court to lower his sentence. However, his appeal demand was rejected, and he was eventually sentenced to 20 years in prison by Judge Teguh Harianto.
