= Winky Wiryawan =

Indonesian actor and musician (born 1978)

- Born: Nurayendra Irwindo; 9 December 1978 (age 47); Bandung, Indonesia
- Occupations: Actor, DJ, television host, music producer, composer
- Years active: 1995–present
- Spouse: Asmara Siswandari

Winky Wiryawan, full name Nurayendra Irwindo (born 9 December 1978), is an actor, DJ, and television host from Indonesia. He is also a Jakarta-based DJ under the nickname DJ Winky.

== Career ==
He was offered a role as Ferdy in the film Jelangkung (2001), which directed by Rizal Mantovani and Jose Purnomo.

Winky then played in a similar themed film, Titik Hitam (2002) directed by Sentot Sahid, who later introduced himself as the director Rudy Soedjarwo and producer Leo Sutanto. Introduction was then opened up opportunities for Winky to star in Singa Karawang-Bekasi (2003), and Chasing the Sun (2004), With the Chasing the Sun, Winky won the category of Best Crying Scene MTV Indonesia Movie Awards (MIMA) 2004.

In 2006, Winky starred in 3 movies at once, Ruang, Berbagi Suami, and 6:30. In the same year, Winky also won the Most Favorite Supporting Actor nomination in the MTV Indonesian Movie Award 2006 through the film Berbagi Suami.

Apart from that, Winky acts as a host for television shows, such as Kuis Terka Gambar Gress in 2005, then the improvisational comedy programs, Akhirnya Datang Juga which is an adaptation of Thank God You're Here, and also served as a judges on DJ's competition program, The Remix.

== Personal life ==
Winky is married to Asmara Siswandari aka Kenes, after 3.5 years together on 1 October 2004, at Masjid At-Taqwa, South Jakarta. Before, they performed traditional proposal ceremony on 17 July 2004.

== Discography ==
=== Album ===
- TOKYO (2005)
- Flower Transformer (2007)

== Filmography ==
=== Film ===
Year	Title	Character	Notes
2001	Jelangkung	Ferdi	
2002	Titik Hitam	Heru	
2003	Singa Karawang-Bekasi	Mahfud	
2004	Mengejar Matahari	Ardi	Nominations Citra Award for Best Leading Actor in Indonesia Film Festival 2004; Best Crying Scene in MTV Indonesia Movie Awards 2004
2005	Janji Joni	Gay Men in Toilet #2	
2006	Ruang	Chairil	Nominations Favorite Leading Role Actor in Indonesian Movie Awards 2007
2006	6:30	Bima	
2006	Berbagi Suami	Nadim	Nominations Most Favorite Supporting Actor in MTV Indonesia Movie Awards 2006
2007	Surat Untuk Ayah	Denny	
2007	Badai Pasti Berlalu	Helmi	Nominations Citra Award for Best Supporting Actor in Indonesian Film Festival 2007; Most Favorite Supporting Actor in MTV Indonesia Movie Awards 2007
2008	Perempuan Punya Cerita	Reno	
2008	Gara-gara Bola	Ahmad	Nominations Best Leading Role Actor in Indonesia Movie Awards 2009; Nominations Favorite Leading Role Actor in MTV Indonesia Movie Awards 2009
2009	Rasa	Actor suicide	
2010	Demi Dewi	Leo	
2010	Sehidup (Tak) Semati	Titan	
2012	Dilema	Said	Segment: "Garis Keras"
2013	3Sum	Morty	Segment: "Insomnight"

=== Television series ===
Year	Character	Title
2008	Elang	Bintang
2008	Aqso dan Madina	Pasha
2009	Rafika	Ruby
2010	Mertua dan Menantu	Abi
2011	Ketika Cinta Bertasbih Meraih Ridho Ilahi	Dr. Fajar
2013	Cinta Ilahi	Marlon
2014	Kita Nikah yuk	Rudi

=== Television shows ===
- MP3 (2002–2003) as host
- Terka Gambar Gress (2005) as host
- Akhirnya Datang Juga (2007–2008, 2024–present) as host
- Dia Lo Gue (2012) as host
- The Remix (2015–2016) as judges

== Awards and nominations ==
Year	Awards	Category	Recipients	Results
2004	Indonesian Film Festival	Citra Award for Best Leading Actor	Mengejar Matahari	Nominated
2004	MTV Indonesia Movie Awards	Best Crying Scene	Mengejar Matahari	Won
2006	MTV Indonesia Movie Awards	Most Favorite Supporting Actor	Berbagi Suami	Nominated
2007	Indonesian Movie Awards	Favorite Leading Role Actor	Ruang	Nominated
2007	Indonesian Film Festival	Citra Award for Best Supporting Actor	Badai Pasti Berlalu	Nominated
2007	MTV Indonesia Movie Awards	Most Favorite Supporting Actor	Badai Pasti Berlalu	Won
2009	MTV Indonesia Movie Awards	Favorite Leading Role Actor	Gara-gara Bola	Nominated
2009	Indonesian Movie Awards	Best Leading Role Actor	Gara-gara Bola	Nominated
