= Quickie Express =

2007 film by Dimas Djayadiningrat

- Directed by: Dimas Djayadiningrat
- Written by: Joko Anwar
- Produced by: Nia Dinata
- Starring: Tora Sudiro; Aming; Sandra Dewi; Lukman Sardi
- Cinematography: Roy Lolang
- Distributed by: Kalyana Shira Film
- Release date: 22 November 2007
- Running time: 117 minutes
- Country: Indonesia
- Language: Indonesian
- Box office: Rp25 billion (1.8 million)

Quickie Express is a 2007 Indonesian film directed by Dimas Djayadiningrat. It stars Tora Sudiro, Aming, Sandra Dewi, and Lukman Sardi. The film premiered on 22 November 2007, and won Best Film at the Jakarta International Film Festival. It has been noted for spawning numerous Indonesian sex comedies.

== Plot ==
Jojo (Tora Sudiro), a young ne'er-do-well, finds a job as gigolo at the Quickie Express; at Quickie Express, all gigolos pose as pizza delivery boys. After training, he and fellow gigolos Marley (Aming) and Piktor (Lukman Sardi) begin at the bottom of the hierarchy, servicing less desirable clients. For satisfying them, the three are soon promoted.

While at a bar, the trio meet Lila (Sandra Dewi); after she is injured in a bar fight, Jojo brings her home to keep an eye on her. Although she leaves before he wakes up, they not long afterwards meet at the hospital when Marley has to have a piranha removed—he had thought the fish was a Flowerhorn cichlid and was bathing with it. Jojo and Lila begin dating; at the same time, Mona (Ira Maya Sopha) takes Jojo to be her exclusive gigolo.

At Lila's birthday party, Jojo learns that she is the daughter of Mona; he also meets her closeted gangster father, Jan Pieter Gunarto (Rudy Wowor). Jojo attempts to break off his contract with Mona so he can be with Lila, but she threatens to tell her daughter about his status as a gigolo. At the same time, Gunarto attempts to make advances on him but is turned down.

Unable to cope with Mona's sexual demands when he loves Lila, Jojo visits her at work and tells her that he is a gigolo; she does not accept this and breaks off their relationship. Gunarto tells his bear Mattheo (Tio Pakusadewo) of his heartbreak. Mattheo becomes enraged with jealousy and drives to Quickie Express to find Jojo, leaving Gunarto behind.

After ransacking the building, Mattheo chases Jojo through Jakarta to a fairground where he corners Jojo on a Ferris wheel. Jojo falls, but is caught by a trampoline erected by Marley and Piktor; when the Ferris wheel starts moving, Mattheo falls to his death. Jojo later becomes a pimp for Quickie Express, while Marley and Piktor find work elsewhere.

== Theme ==
The release for the film's run at 21 Cineplex noted that Quickie Express was a "dark comedy" and Iwan Seti and Drupadi of The Jakarta Post write that it has been lumped with sex comedies that were produced after its success. However, the producer, Nia Dinata, said that she saw the film as a "love story with social content".

== Release and reception ==
Quickie Express received a wide release on 22 November 2007. It was also shown at the Jakarta International Film Festival, where it won Best Film. The film sparked a wave of sex-themed comedies, and received mixed to positive reviews.

A reviewer for the Indonesian popular culture news site KapanLagi.com wrote that the film had a light but enjoyable plot that was ruined by the cast's lack of acting skill. Heated criticism was directed at Dewi's character, who was described as "a young doctor who talks like a high school student". The review summarized that it would be a good film for those who enjoyed jokes about sex.

Fajar Anugerah for Detik.com wrote that Quickie Express was a different offering than the then-usual horror movies, giving moviegoers a chance to laugh. He noted that the characterization was complex but generally well carried out. He gave the acting a mixed review, with Sudiro and Aming acting as if they were "in a TV show".; the acting by Sardi, Pakusadewo, and Dewi was praised, with Dewi's character being described as "arousing".

Paolo Bertolin, writing for the Udine Far East Film Festival, called Quickie Express "intriguing and alluring" and screenwriter Joko Anwar's "most mature and rounded work". He wrote that the final act could "make more than one jaw drop" and is especially surprising as the film comes from the largest predominantly Muslim country in the world.

== Awards ==
Quickie Express won two Indonesian Movie Awards, for Best Supporting Actor and Favourite Newcomer. It also won Best Film at the Jakarta International Film Festival.

| Award | Year | Category | Recipient | Result |
|---|---|---|---|---|
| Indonesian Movie Awards | 2008 | Best Supporting Actor | Tio Pakusadewo | Won |
| Indonesian Movie Awards | 2008 | Favourite Newcomer | Sandra Dewi | Won |
| Jakarta International Film Festival | 2008 | Best Film | – | Won |

== Notes ==
1. Original: "... seorang dokter muda dengan cara bicara anak SMA."
2. Original: "... di [acara] yang ditayangkan di sebuah stasiun televisi swasta.."
3. Original: "... menggemaskan ...".
