= Sandra Dewi =

Indonesian actress (born 1983)

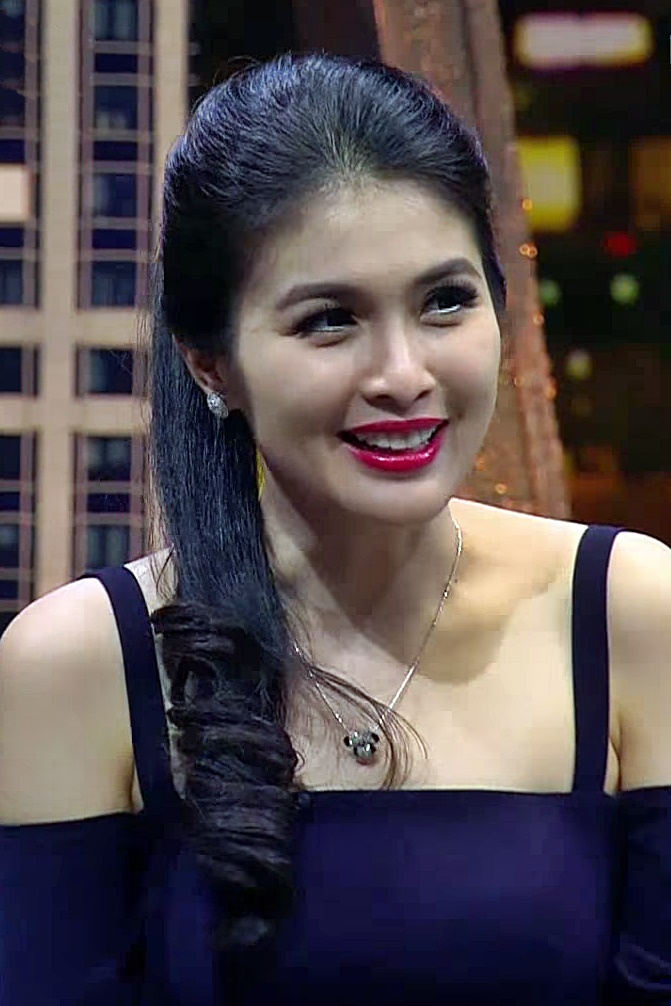
- Sandra Dewi in 2016
- Born: Monica Nicholle Sandra Dewi Gunawan Basri; 8 August 1983 (age 43); Pangkal Pinang, Bangka Belitung, Indonesia
- Education: London School of Public Relations
- Occupations: Celebrity; businessperson; brand ambassador
- Years active: 2002 - present
- Spouse: Harvey Moeis (m. 2016)
- Children: 2
- Awards: Indonesian Movie Award for Best Newcomer

Monica Nicholle Sandra Dewi Gunawan Basri (born 8 August 1983), better known as Sandra Dewi, is an Indonesian actress, businessperson, and brand ambassador for several Indonesian and South East Asian brands.

== Biography ==
Sandra Dewi was born on 8 August 1983, in Pangkal Pinang, Bangka Belitung. She is the oldest of three children, born to Andreas Gunawan Basri and Chatarina Erliani. She is of Chinese, Japanese, and Palembang descent. After growing up in Pangkal Pinang and attending catholic schools, she moved to Jakarta with her family in 2001 to attend London School of Public Relations. Shortly afterwards, she won Miss Enchanteur beauty pageant and in 2002 was selected as Tourism Envoy for West Jakarta. She later also participated in Fun Fearless Female contest held by Cosmopolitan Indonesia in 2006, where she placed second.

Sandra Dewi got her big break by starring in a role in the 2007 comedy Quickie Express, for which she received the 2008 Indonesian Movie Award for Best Newcomer. The following year, she collaborated with Dewi Sandra and Luna Maya on the song "Play", which was released for the UEFA Euro 2008. She also starred in the movie Tarzan ke Kota, where she sang in several of the movie's soundtracks.

Sandra Dewi has since starred in Indonesian soap operas and music videos, including Mulan Jameela's 2008 hit single "Wonder Woman". She has also appeared in advertising campaigns for Clear, Pond's, Nokia, Aux Air Conditioner, Toyota, Yong Ma, and Sharp. She was named "the most searched artist" by Yahoo! Indonesia in 2009.

Sandra Dewi is the Director of Corporate Communication of PT Paramount Land, one of the biggest property companies in Indonesia. in 2018, she represented Indonesia in the 'Super-Hair World Cup V' at the celebrity hairstyle website Super-Hair.Net, and won the championship in a tournament of online voting.

She has described herself as still being a devout practicing Catholic.

== Personal life ==
In November 2016, Sandra Dewi married businessperson, Harvey Moeis in Tokyo Disneyland. The couple have 2 sons.

== Controversy ==
In March 2024, Sandra Dewi's husband Harvey Moeis was identified as a suspect and detained by the Indonesian Attorney General's Office (AGO) in connection with corruption allegations related to tin trading permits issued to the state-owned company PT Timah Tbk, where it's believed to have caused environmental damage amounting to 271 trillion rupiahs (US$17 billion), the highest scale of corruption ever recorded in Indonesia. Moeis was accused of acting as a middleman to help a private firm, Refined Bangka Tin (RBT), illegally manage mining areas belonging to Timah. The case has prompted investigations into Moeis and Dewi's extravagant lifestyle, including Sandra Dewi's habit of purchasing luxury goods and the purchase of a private jet as a birthday gift for their 2-year-old son.

In April 2024, a Rolls-Royce and a Mini Cooper car unit which belonged to Sandra Dewi and Harvey Moeis were seized by the authorities, as well as 76 billion rupiahs (US$7 million) in cash, 1 kilogram of gold, and electronic devices and documents linked to Moeis's criminal activities. Authorities also blocked Moeis's personal bank accounts. Roughly three weeks later, authorities confiscated two more car units, a Toyota Vellfire and a white Lexus. Sandra Dewi has not provided any information regarding her husband's case to the public, and was seen closing the comments column on her personal Instagram account soon after her husband's detainment. In April 2024, Dewi was summoned as a witness by the Indonesian Attorney General's Office. Sandra Dewi is at risk of receiving a sentence to either a five-year imprisonment or a penalty amounting to 1 billion rupiah (US$62,900) if she is found guilty of profiting from her husband's corrupt funds.

== Filmography ==
Film
Year	Title
2002	A Very Slow Breakfast
2007	Quickie Express
2008	Tarzan ke Kota (Tarzan Goes to the city)
2012	Langit Ke - 7
2016	I Am Hope
2016	Triangle the Dark Side

Television
Year	Title
2005	Preman Kampus (Campus Thug)
2007	Cinta Indah (Beautiful Love)
2008	Saya Jameela (I am Jameela)
2008	Elang (Eagle)
	Hidayah (Guidance)
	Kejamnya Dunia (The World is Cruel)
2010	Nurhaliza
2010	Langit dan Bumi (Heaven and Earth)
	Cahaya Cinta (The Light of Love)
2012	Putri Bidadari (Princess Angel)
2013	Tangan Tangan Mungil (Little Hands)
2014	Kita Nikah Yuk (Let's Get Married)
