= Janji Joni =

2005 Indonesian adventure romantic comedy film

Joni's Promise
- Theatrical poster
- Janji Joni
- Directed by: Joko Anwar
- Written by: Joko Anwar
- Produced by: Nia Dinata
- Starring: Nicholas Saputra; Mariana Renata; Rachel Maryam; Surya Saputra
- Cinematography: Ipung Rachmat Syaiful
- Edited by: Yoga Krispratama
- Music by: Age Airlangga
- Production company: Kalyana Shira Film
- Distributed by: Kalyana Shira Film (Indonesia); Golden Village Pictures (Singapore); Focus Films (Worldwide)
- Release date: 27 April 2005
- Running time: 83 [minutes
- Country: Indonesia
- Languages: Indonesian; English
- Budget: Rp 3.5 billion

Janji Joni (English: Joni's Promise) is a 2005 Indonesian adventure romantic comedy film written and directed by Joko Anwar in his directorial debut. Starring Nicholas Saputra, Mariana Renata, Rachel Maryam, and Surya Saputra, the film was a commercial and critical success, earning Anwar his first Citra Award for Best Director nomination.

The film features multiple cameo appearances from well-known celebrities.

== Synopsis ==
Joni works as a film/reel delivery man in Jakarta. One day, while waiting for the next pick-up, Joni meets a charming girl who is going to catch a film with her boyfriend Otto. The girl would only reveal her name to Joni if he successfully delivers the reels on time. However, things do not turn out well on that day as Joni faces obstacles such as the city's notorious traffic and various people that may disrupt his task.

== Cast ==
- Nicholas Saputra as Joni
  - Irshadi Bagas as young Joni
- Mariana Renata as Angelique
- Rachel Maryam as Voni
- Surya Saputra as Otto
- Sujiwo Tejo as Adam Subandi
- Dwiky Riza as Toni
- Gito Rollies as Pak Ucok
- Fedi Nuril as Jeffrey

=== Notable cameos ===
- Barry Prima as a taxi driver
- Adetasha as the taxi driver's wife
- Alvin Adam as a journalist
- Jajang C. Noer as an audience of "Spoiler"
- Indra Birowo and Noella Birowo as a couple
- Ananda Mikola and Wulan Guritno as a couple
- Indra Herlambang as a man in queue
- Aming Sugandhi as a man in queue
- Ersa Mayori as the pretty girl face mask
- Lukman Sardi as Joni's father
- Tora Sudiro and Winky Wiryawan as a gay couple
- Ronal Surapradja as an assistant director
- Shandy Tumiwa as an actor
- Catherine Wilson as an actress
- Tantowi Yahya as a gynecologist

== Production ==
According to producer Nia Dinata, the shooting process for Janji Joni was very challenging due to unpredictable weather and also having to shoot secretly in certain areas due to the production team not having permits from local authorities. This was coupled with intimidation from local thugs who demanded payment in order for the crew to be able to shoot in certain locations. Overall, the shooting took place over 20 days.

== Release ==
Janji Joni received theatrical release on April 28, 2005, in Indonesia, followed by Malaysia on September 1, 2005, and Singapore on November 9, 2006. It was screened at several international film festivals, including the Busan International Film Festival, Deauville Asian Film Festival, and the Bangkok International Film Festival.

A book containing Anwar's screenplay and production was published by Metafor titled Janji Joni: Skenario dan Catatan.

== Reception ==
Writing for Tempo, Leila Chudori praised the film, calling it "intelligent and calculated" while noting Anwar's "smart and sharp" directing style and singling out the performances of Nicholas Saputra and Surya Saputra.

In 2019, fourteen years since the film's release, Panos Katzothanasis reviewed the film for Asian Movie Pulse and called the film "unique" with "extremely intelligent, pointy, and ironic sense of humor" while noting that it "thrives in context, intelligent irony, and overall entertainment and is definitely among the best in Joko Anwar’s oeuvre." Katzothanasis singled out Nicholas Saputra and Sujiwo Tejo as stand-out performances in the film.

Tempo magazine named Janji Joni its pick for best film of the year.

== Awards and nominations ==
Year	Award	Category	Recipients	Result
2005	25th Citra Awards	Best Picture	Janji Joni	Nominated
2005	25th Citra Awards	Best Director	Joko Anwar	Nominated
2005	25th Citra Awards	Best Actor	Nicholas Saputra	Nominated
2005	25th Citra Awards	Best Supporting Actor	Gito Rollies	Won
2005	25th Citra Awards	Best Supporting Actor	Surya Saputra	Nominated
2005	25th Citra Awards	Best Supporting Actress	Rachel Maryam	Nominated
2005	25th Citra Awards	Best Editing	Yoga Krispratama	Won
2005	25th Citra Awards	Best Original Score	Age Airlangga	Nominated
2005	25th Citra Awards	Best Cinematography	Ipung Rachmat Syaiful	Nominated
2005	MTV Indonesia Movie Awards	Best Movie	Janji Joni	Won
2005	MTV Indonesia Movie Awards	Best Director	Joko Anwar	Nominated
2005	MTV Indonesia Movie Awards	Best Crying Scene	Adetasha	Nominated
2005	MTV Indonesia Movie Awards	Most Favorite Movie	Janji Joni	Nominated
2005	MTV Indonesia Movie Awards	Most Favorite Actor	Nicholas Saputra	Won
2005	MTV Indonesia Movie Awards	Most Favorite Supporting Actor	Barry Prima	Nominated
2005	MTV Indonesia Movie Awards	Most Favorite Supporting Actress	Mariana Renata	Won
2005	MTV Indonesia Movie Awards	Most Favorite Supporting Actress	Rachel Maryam	Nominated
2005	Asia-Pacific Film Festival	Best Editing	Yoga Krispratama	Won
2006	Vesoul International Film Festival of Asian Cinema	Golden Wheel	Joko Anwar	Nominated
