= Eiffel... I'm in Love =

- Original DVD cover
- Directed by: Nasri Cheppy
- Written by: Rachmania Arunita
- Produced by: Raam Soraya; Sunil Soraya
- Starring: Samuel Rizal; Shandy Aulia; Yogi Finanda; Titi Kamal; Didi Petet; Hilda Arifin; Rianti Cartwright; Helmy Yahya
- Edited by: Dewi S. Alibasah; Sastha Sunu
- Music by: Melly Goeslaw; Anto Hoed
- Production company: Soraya Intercine Films
- Release date: 21 November 2003
- Running time: 262 minutes (extended version)
- Country: Indonesia
- Language: Indonesian
- Box office: US$6.4 million

Eiffel... I'm in Love is a 2003 Indonesian teen romantic comedy film directed by Nasri Cheppy. The film stars Samuel Rizal and Shandy Aulia as the main characters, the film adaptation of the bestselling novel of the same name by Rachmania Arunita. Other people appearing in the film include Titi Kamal, Helmy Yahya, Didi Petet, and Hilda Arifin.

The movie won an award for "Most Favorite Movie" and nomination for "Best Movie" at the 2004 MTV Indonesia Movie Awards.

== Plot ==
Based on the book with the same title, it tells the story about a teenage girl, Tita (Shandy Aulia), who led a perfect life. She had a lovely family, a patient boyfriend and 2 best friends who are always by her side. However, her mother was overly protective towards her and she is not allowed to go out. Her life completely changes when her parents good friend and his son, Adit (Samuel Rizal), came from France to stay with them. Tita was supposed to pick both of them from the airport. However, she waited at the wrong terminal and only realized that when Adit accidentally bumped into her and asked her whether she was the one who supposed to picked him and his father up. Adit was very cold to Tita from the start, however, her parents saw him as a reliable man and trust him to take care of their daughter. Things became worse when Adit told Tita that their parents were planning to forcibly match them as a couple.

== Cast ==
- Samuel Rizal as Adit
- Shandy Aulia as Tita
  - Vicka (uncredited role) as Young Tita (Extended version only)
- Yogi Finanda as Ergi
- Titi Kamal as Intan (Guest Star)
- Didi Petet as Reza (Adit's Father)
- Hilda Arifin as Mother Tita
- Helmy Yahya as Father Tita
- Tommy Kurniawan as Alan
- Saphira Indah as Uni
- Rianti Cartwright as Fara

== Production ==
The film was shot in Paris.

== Extended version ==
Eiffel... I'm in Love has an extended version, which released a year later and reviews the story in this film in more depth.

== Album ==
Ost. Eiffel I'm in Love

Soundtrack album by Melly Goeslaw
- Released: 2003
- Recorded: 2003
- Genre: Pop
- Language: Indonesian
- Label: Aquarius Musikindo
- Producer: Anto Hoed

Melly Goeslaw chronology
Ada Apa dengan Cinta? (2002)	Ost. Eiffel I'm in Love (2003)	Intuisi (2005)

Singles from Eiffel I'm in Love: Original Soundtrack
- 1. "Pujaanku (Ft. Jimmo)"; 2. "Tak Tahan Lagi"; 3. "Bercintalah Denganku"

Singles from Eiffel I'm in Love Repackaged Soundtrack
- 1. "Dahsyat"

Eiffel I'm in Love is a soundtrack to the 2003 film of the same name, released on 24 October 2003, by Aquarius Musikindo. The soundtrack features Melly Goeslaw as the lead singer, Jimmo, and Yann (a former Koolkynky member). The soundtrack features ten original songs written for the film, as well as "Eiffel I'm in Love" film score composed by Goeslaw.

=== Track listing ===
Standard edition
No.	Title	Performer(s)	Length
1.	"Bercintalah Denganku" ("Love with Me")	Melly Goeslaw
2.	"Memang Enak" ("Trully Great")	Goeslaw
3.	"Paling Tidak" ("Mostly Not")	Goeslaw
4.	"Dalam Hening Hati" ("In the Silence of the Heart")	Goeslaw
5.	"Pujaanku" ("My Darling")	Goeslaw featuring Jimmo
6.	"Dunia Milik Berdua" ("The World is Both of Us")	Goeslaw
7.	"Tak Tahan Lagi" ("Can't Hold Again")	Goeslaw
8.	"Eiffel... I'm in Love"
9.	"Bulan Kedua" ("The Second Month")	Goeslaw
10.	"Ternyata..." ("Evidently...")	Goeslaw and Yann
11.	"Kamu" ("You")	Goeslaw

=== Additional repackaged songs ===
Repackaged edition
No.	Title	Performer(s)	Length
12.	"Dahsyat"	Goeslaw
13.	"Paling Tidak" (Remix version)	Goeslaw
14.	"Bulan Kedua" (Remix version)	Goeslaw
15.	"Bercintalah Denganku" (Acoustic version)	Goeslaw

== Awards and nominations ==
Year	Awards	Category	Recipients	Result
2004	MTV Indonesia Movie Awards	Most Favorite Movie	Eiffel I'm in Love	Won
2004	MTV Indonesia Movie Awards	Best Movie	Eiffel I'm in Love	Nominated
2004	MTV Indonesia Movie Awards	Most Favorite Actor	Samuel Rizal	Won
2004	MTV Indonesia Movie Awards	Most Favorite Actress	Shandy Aulia	Nominated
2004	MTV Indonesia Movie Awards	Best Song in Movie	Melly Goeslaw (featuring Jimmo) – "Pujaanku" (Eiffel I'm in Love)	Nominated
2004	MTV Indonesia Movie Awards	Best Crying Scene	Shandy Aulia	Nominated
2004	MTV Indonesia Movie Awards	Best Director	Nasri Cheppy	Nominated

== Box office ==
Eiffel... I'm in Love was a box office success and set a box office record that was not broken till the release of Ayat-Ayat Cinta (2008).

== Sequel ==
A sequel titled Eiffel I'm in Love 2 was released in 2018.
