= Sausan Machari =

Sausan Machari is an Indonesian-born singer and actress of mixed Indonesian and Arabic descent who started her career as a model at the age of 16.

After traveling the world, Machari debuted in the role of Vela for her first feature film, Detik Terakhir (The Last Second) – an award-winning, highly controversial film based on the tragic, true story of an Indonesian lesbian heroin addict. She was nominated for best supporting actress at the Citra Awards in 2005 and also recorded the lead vocals for the film’s soundtrack.

In 2011, she played a leading role as Jasmin, an Arabic activist who leaves an arranged marriage in Saudi Arabia for her freedom in Bali, in the independent, philosophical drama Description Without Place.

She went on to star as Lara, a high-society call girl who escapes her past with a newborn child and the help of a friend, in the dark Indonesian comedy/drama Hati Ke Hati in 2013.

Machari is managed by Marta Michaud from Cinematic Management and currently resides in New York City, where she acts and performs as a singer.
