= Dunia Tanpa Koma =

- Starring: Dian Sastrowardoyo; Tora Sudiro; Fauzi Baadilla; Cut Mini; Wulan Guritno; Surya Saputra; Unique Priscilla
- Country of origin: Indonesia
- No. of episodes: 14 (Season 1)

Production
- Running time: 90 minutes

Original release
- Network: RCTI
- Release: 9 September – 9 December 2006

Dunia Tanpa Koma (DTK) (English: The World without Commas) is the first Indonesian television series to adopt a seasonal system. The series follows Raya (Dian Sastrowardoyo), a reporter working for a weekly magazine called Target.

The series features many prominent Indonesian actors, including Tora Sudiro and Cut Mini. It combines various genres such as thriller, action, and romance.

The creator, Leila Chudori — a journalist for Tempo magazine — stated that she intended to revitalise Indonesian television, which she considered to be in decline.

Dunia Tanpa Koma premiered on 9 September 2006. In its first season, the story focuses on a drug syndicate that Raya and her colleagues are trying to expose through Target. They find themselves in danger, especially when a murder case arises in one of the episodes.

The series was broadcast on RCTI during primetime at 9 p.m. on Saturdays and was produced by SinemArt.

== Season 1 ==
Raya (Dian Sastrowardoyo) begins a new career in journalism at a weekly magazine called Target. An independent young woman who commutes to the office by bicycle, she finds herself in rivalry with Seruni (Wulan Guritno), a senior journalist who has worked at Target for many years. Seruni often teases and criticises Raya during daily meetings, feeling jealous because Raya receives different treatment from the other staff. However, midway through the season, they gradually become closer despite their initial rivalry.

The editor-in-chief of Target, Bayu (Tora Sudiro), falls in love with Raya, even though he already has a fiancée who works at the same office, and Raya has a boyfriend. Raya's boyfriend, Bram (Fauzi Baadilah), works at Harian Kini, a rival publication. Their personal relationship sometimes causes problems, particularly when Raya accidentally reveals exclusive news to Bram that was supposed to be Target's headline. Another key character is Retno, Bayu's best friend and professional partner, who remains single.

=== 1. Hari-Hari Pertama (The First Days) ===
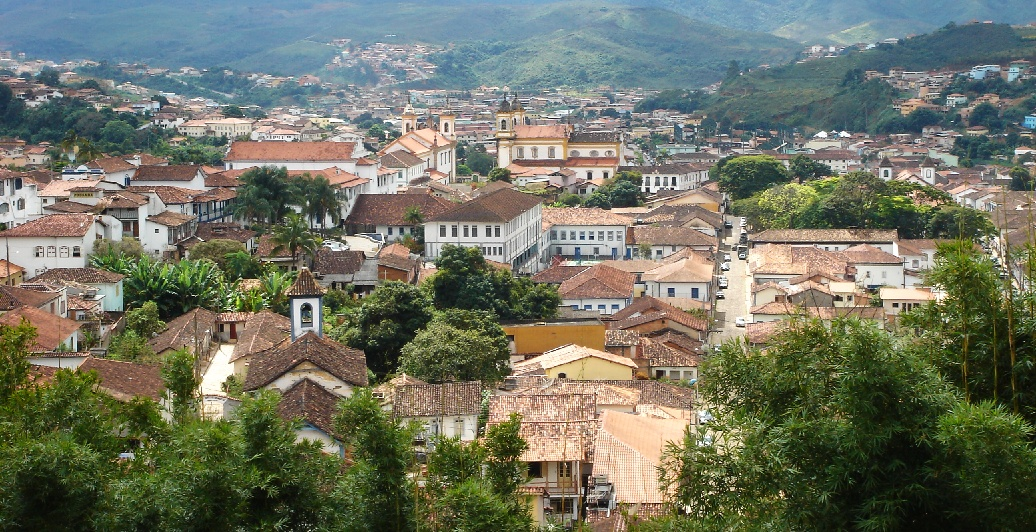
Mariana (center) came to Target.

During a morning meeting at Target's headquarters, President Director Bondan Pratomo is furious at his staff for failing to cover the arrest of actor Arifin, which became the headline of rival publication Harian Kini. Arifin had been caught at dawn by police during a rave party in his hotel room.

On the same morning, Raya Maryadi, a fresh graduate in politics from New York University and daughter of Bondan's best friend Mr. Maryadi, starts her first day at Target. Seruni is jealous of Raya's special treatment due to her background. Raya's first assignment is to interview Indonesia's top model, Mariana Renata, who has long been on Target's wanted list.

When attempting to interview Mariana, Raya encounters Bramantyo (Bram), a legendary reporter from Harian Kini who is covering Arifin's case. Bram tips her off about the Red Bar, a place frequented by celebrities to use drugs. Raya does not interview Mariana as planned; instead, she finds people overdosed and meets her former boyfriend, Jendra Aditya, the owner of Red Bar. Raya and Jendra had both studied in the United States — Raya in New York City under a scholarship, and Jendra in Los Angeles supported by his family.

Raya goes home with Bram and reveals her past relationship with Jendra, surprising him. Bram then informs her that Jendra is the leader of a drug syndicate. Following Bram's tip, Raya successfully interviews Mariana, who even visits Target's office, surprising Raya's colleagues and earning their applause.

=== 2. Langkah Awal (The First Step) ===
The police intensify their efforts to investigate the drug syndicate. Etty, a seemingly ordinary housewife with two children, is arrested for drug dealing.

At the office, Bayu praises Raya for her article on Mariana, provoking more teasing from Seruni. Raya is assigned not only to the entertainment section but also to cover the drug syndicate case. She visits the Red Bar and interviews a bartender, Dodo, who had already been questioned by the police. Raya also witnesses Jendra's celebrity girlfriend, Oli Hamdani, using cocaine.

Raya's relationship with Bram deepens. When Bram drops Raya at the office, Bayu sees them and becomes jealous. Retno warns Bayu that it is too early to feel possessive. Bayu and Bram are rivals in pursuing exclusive stories. Musician Andi RIF makes a cameo appearance in this episode, performing at the Red Bar, where Jendra's men later kidnap Dodo with the intention of killing him. However, Dodo survives, though left unconscious.

=== 3. Red Bar ===
Oli Hamdani is found sweating, with disheveled hair and a pale face, sitting on a bed surrounded by needles and drugs.

At the office, Bayu officially assigns Raya to the investigative team on the drug syndicate due to her success with the Mariana story and information about Jendra. Seruni initially refuses to work with Raya.

Meanwhile, Dodo recovers in hospital with serious injuries. Raya and Bayu visit Dodo's wife, Annisa, to offer support. Bayu reassures Raya that it is not her fault, as Dodo had been targeted by Jendra's men.

At the hospital, Bram appears, creating tension when he embraces Raya. Jealous, Bayu leaves abruptly. Bram then takes Raya to a waterfall outside the city, where they share a kiss.

Desi, Bayu's fiancée and a colleague at Target, becomes suspicious when she learns Bayu visited the hospital with Raya and questions why he has not set a wedding date.

Raya interviews Jendra at Red Bar, but instead of answering her questions, Jendra complains about her decision to pursue journalism despite her politics degree. Raya finds the interview unsatisfying. Meanwhile, Oli is found dead from an overdose at Red Bar, and her body is taken away for autopsy. Raya is shocked, as she had just seen Oli with Jendra before the interview.

- 4. Raya & Yoan
- 5. Sidik Jarimu Di Sekujur Tubuhku (Your Finger Prints Around My Body)
- 6. All The Right Moves
- 7. Closure
- 8. Sonny Krisnantara
- 9. His World Against Her World,
- 10. Setangkai Nista untuk Mutiara (A Stalk of Disgrace for a Pearl)
- 11. Jendra Aditya
- 12. Hakim Daus (Judge Daus)
- 13. Marita
- 14. Sebuah Dunia Bernama Raya (A World Called Raya)
