= MTV Indonesia Movie Awards =

- Awarded for: Best in film
- Country: Indonesia
- Presented by: MTV Indonesia
- First award: 2004

MTV Indonesia Movie Awards (or MIMA) is an awards show in Indonesia which were established in 1995. The show is based on the US MTV Movie Awards format celebrating local film and actors.

== Host Cities ==
Year	Venue	City	Host
2004	Assembly Hall, Jakarta Convention Center	Senayan	Sarah Sechan
2005	Assembly Hall, Jakarta Convention Center	Senayan	Sarah Sechan
2006	Balai Sarbini	Jakarta	Sarah Sechan
2007	Teater Tanah Air, Taman Mini Indonesia Indah	Jakarta	Daniel Mananta and Sarah Sechan

== Categories ==
The categories are divided into "Most Favourite" and "Best" subcategories. Among the categories is also a "Lifetime Achievement Award".

=== Most Favourite ===
- Most Favourite Movie
- Most Favourite Actor
- Most Favorite Actress
- Most Favourite Supporting Actor
- Most Favourite Supporting Actress
- Most Favourite Heart Meltin。g Moment
- Most Favourite Rising Star

=== Best ===
- Best Movie
- Best Director
- Best Crying Scene
- Best Song in the Movie
- Best Scary Scene
- Best Running Scene

== Award winners ==
Category	2004	2005	2006	2007
Best Movie	Arisan	Janji Joni	Berbagi Suami	Nagabonar Jadi 2
Best Director	Nia Dinata (Arisan)	Garin Nugroho (Rindu Kami Padamu)	Riri Riza (Gie)	John de Rantau (Denias, Senandung di Atas Awan)
Most Favourite Movie	Eiffel I'm in Love	Ungu Violet	Heart	
Most Favourite Actor	Samuel Rizal (Eiffel I'm In Love)	Nicholas Saputra (Janji Joni)	Nicholas Saputra (Gie)	Tora Sudiro (Nagabonar Jadi 2)
Most Favorite Actress	Nirina Zubir(30 hari Mencari Cinta)	Dian Sastrowardoyo (Ungu Violet)	Titi Kamal (Mendadak Dangdut)	Dinna Olivia (Mengejar Mas-Mas)
Most Favourite Supporting Actor	Surya Saputra (Arisan)	Fauzi Baadila (Tentang Dia)	Tio Pakusadewo (Berbagi Suami)	Winky Wiryawan (Badai Pasti Berlalu)
Most Favourite Supporting Actress	Titi Kamal (Eiffel I'm In Love)	Mariana Renata (Janji Joni)	Ria Irawan (Berbagi Suami)	Wulan Guritno (Nagabonar Jadi 2)
Best Crying Scene	Winky Wiryawan (Mengejar Matahari)	Putri Mulia (Rindu Kami Padamu)	Sita Nursanti (Gie)	
Most Favourite Heart Melting Moment	Vino Bastian and Maria Agnes (30 hari Mencari Cinta)		Nirina Zubir and Irwansyah (Heart)	
Best Song in the Movie	Mengejar Matahari - Ari Lasso	Tentang Dia - Melly Goeslaw and Evan Sanders	My Heart - Irwansyah and Acha Septriasa	Pulang - Float (band)
Most Favourite Rising Star		Laudya Chintya Bella (Virgin)	Jonathan Mulia (Gie)	Albert Fakdawer (Denias, Senandung di Atas Awan)
Lifetime Achievement	Christine Hakim		Deddy Mizwar	
Best Scary Scene	Hantu Tinta			Kuntilanak
Best Running Scene				Maaf, Saya Menghamili Istri Anda

== See also ==
- Cinema of Indonesia
