= Rachel Maryam =

Indonesian actress, model and politician

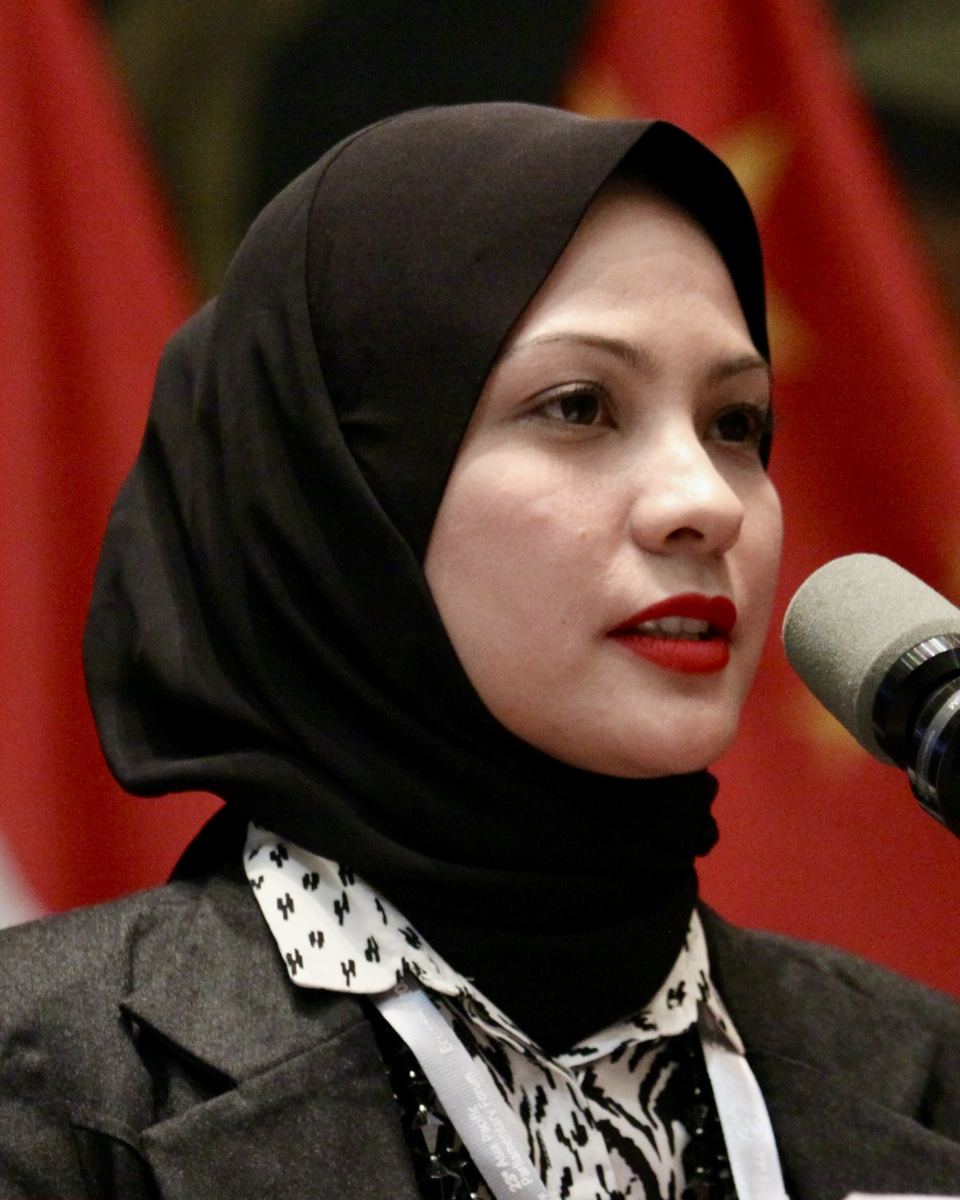
- Rachel Maryam in 2015

Member of People's Representative Council
- Incumbent
- Assumed office 1 October 2009
- Constituency: West Java II

Personal details
- Born: Rachel Maryam Sayidina; April 20, 1980 (age 45) Bandung, West Java, Indonesia
- Party: Gerindra Party
- Spouse(s): Muhammad Akbar Pradana (m. 2005; div. 2010) Edwin Aprihandono (m. 2011)
- Occupation: Celebrity, Model, Politician

Rachel Maryam Sayidina (/ˈreɪtʃəl mɑːrijəm/; born 20 April 1980) is an Indonesian actress, model and politician of Sundanese descent who became a member of the House of Representatives (DPR) of Republic of Indonesia (RI) for three consecutive terms (2009 - 2014, 2014 - 2019 and 2019 - 2024).

== Education ==
Rachel Maryam participated actively in school theater during her high school years (Sekolah Menengah Atas 19 Bandung alumni) and intended to further her education at the Jakarta Institute of Art. However, his mother was adamant that her daughter attend a hospitality school. She felt out of place at her Bandung Tourism College, so she decided to transfer to Jakarta instead of continuing her education there.

== Acting career ==
After starring as Sheila in the music video for "Kekasih Gelap" on 7, Rachel Maryam rose to fame in Jakarta. She became the Best MTV 2001 Clip Model as a result. She then made her way into the professional acting scene by appearing in a number of movies and soap operas, including "Eliana, Eliana" in 2002. She acted opposite Jajang C. Noer, the playwright and director Arifin C. Noer's wife, in the movie. For three months, she also attended an acting class in Germany. Her quick learning paid off, as she won the Best Supporting Actress prize for the 2003 movie "Arisan!". In the 2000s, Rachel Maryam kept up her acting career, appearing in several highly regarded Indonesian films, including "The Gathering!" 2003, "Janji Joni" and "Vina Bilang Cinta" in 2005.

== Political career ==
Rachel Maryam verified her DPR membership via the Gerindra Party. She was the sole legislative candidate from Gerindra Party to be elected as the people's representative in the West Java II electoral district. 25,540 votes were cast for the 1980s Bandung-born musician who assiduously trailed Prabowo Subianto around Indonesia during the most recent legislative election campaign. She became a member of the DPR RI on 1 October 2009.

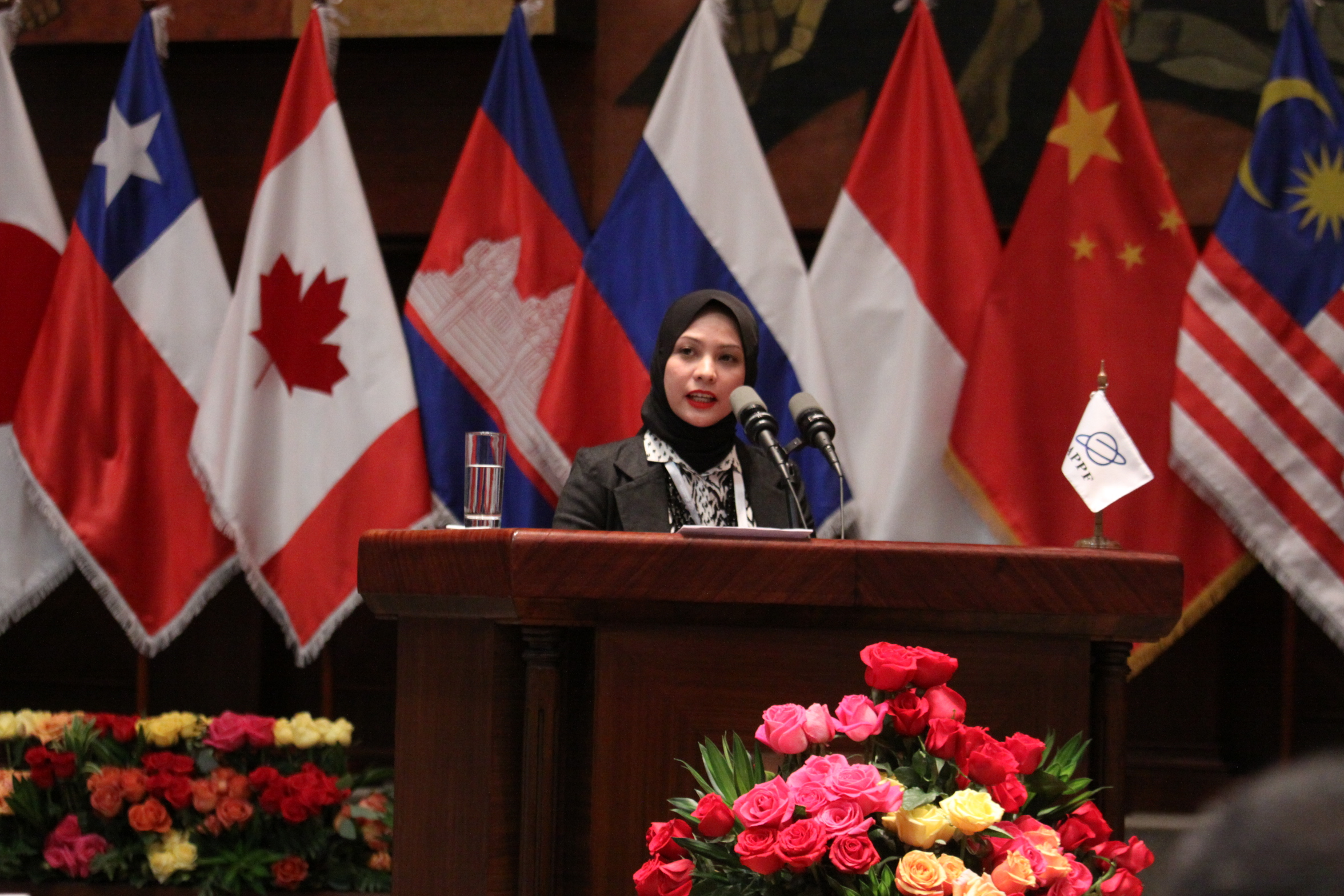
Rachel Maryam at the 23rd Asia Pacific Parliamentary Forum in 2015

As a representative of the Gerindra Party in the DPR RI, Rachel Maryam went back to her Senayan seat. based on the fact that she garnered over 16,000 votes in the West Bandung Regency. Cimahi would be recapitulated on 23 April 2014, does not yet have this added. "The key is not to disappoint the constituents who voted for us. The electoral district must be visited frequently, must communicate frequently to the electoral district," she stated on 10 January 2014. She also emphasised the significance of upholding the confidence of those who had selected her.

Rachel Maryam requested a postponement of President Joko Widodo's "magic card" debut on 11 July 2014. She claims that there are still some basic issues with the government program that is supposed to be its cornerstone. The fundamental issue she refers towasis the lack of the "magic card" program's legal protection. She understood that Jokowi-Jusuf Kalla wants to fulfill the community's campaign promise as soon as possible.

On social media, a letter dated 18 March 2015, written by a member of the DPR's first commission on behalf of Rachel Maryam was forwarded to the Indonesian ambassador to France and the Principality of Andorra. The member requested local transportation in Paris as well as assistance with airport pickup upon arrival in her letter. She said that since she and her family had only dropped by while on holiday, the letter to the Indonesian embassy was merely a request for information. She had previously acknowledged that she had approached the embassy for assistance in locating a car. She refuted claims that she traveled to Paris, France, using public funds. She acknowledged that she had contacted the embassy for assistance in locating a car. They do, however, cover all expenses on their own.

The Gerindra Party assigned her to Commission I DPR RI from 2009 to 2019, Member of Commission II DPR RI from 2019 to 2020, and Member of Commission I DPR RI from 2020 to the present. Commission I DPR RI oversees intelligence, communication, defense, foreign policy, and informatics. She was reported to have received 145,636 votes, which led to her election as a member of the DPR-RI for the 2019 - 2024 term. She was reelected for a fourthterm in the 2024 election with 114,749 votes.

== Personal life ==
On 20 April 1980, Rachel Maryam was born in Bandung. Rachel Maryam's family was the source of her talent. The grandmothers of his father and mother were a sinden and a harpist, respectively.

On 25 July 2005, she wed Muhammad Akbar Pradana, also known as Ebes. A child, Muhammad Kale Mata Angin, was born on 29 July 2006. Rachel Maryam and Ebes officially got divorced on 13 October 2010, and she was granted child care rights by the judge in the ruling. She was secretly remarried to businessman Edwin Aprihandono (Edo) on 16 December 2011, with the closest of friends and family attended the low-key wedding.

== Filmography ==
Year	Title	Role	Notes
2002	Eliana, Eliana	Eliana	
2002	Andai Ia Tau	Renata Adiswara	
2003	Arisan!	Lita	
2004	Anne van Jogja	Anne	
2005	Janji Joni	Voni	
2005	Vina Bilang Cinta	Cillia Yulia	
2005	Belahan Jiwa	Cairo	
2006	d'Girlz Begins		
2007	Medley	Maya Ariasena	
2008	Perempuan Punya Cerita	Wulan	Segment: Island Story
2009	Sepuluh	Yanti	
2011	Arisan! 2	Lita	
2013	Rectoverso: Cinta yang Tak Terucap	-	As a director in the Firasat segment

== Awards and nominations ==
Year	Award	Category	Recipients	Results
2003	Deauville Asian Film Festival	Best Actress	Eliana, Eliana	Won
2004	Festival Film Indonesia	Best Female Lead	Eliana, Eliana	Nominated
2004	Festival Film Indonesia	Best Supporting Actress	Arisan!	Won
2004	Festival Film Bandung	Commed Female Maid Cast Cinema Film	Arisan!	Nominated
2004	MTV Indonesia Movie Awards	Most Favourite Supporting Actress	Arisan!	Nominated
2004	MTV Indonesia Movie Awards	Most Favourite Actress	Andai Ia Tahu	Nominated
2005	Festival Film Bandung	Commed Female Maid Cast Cinema Film	Janji Joni	Nominated
2005	MTV Indonesia Movie Awards	Most Favourite Supporting Actress	Janji Joni	Nominated
2005	Festival Film Indonesia	Best Supporting Actress	Janji Joni	Nominated
2007	Indonesian Movie Actors Awards	Best Supporting Actress	Janji Joni	Nominated
2007	Indonesian Movie Actors Awards	Favourite Female Supporting Actor	Janji Joni	Nominated
2007	Indonesian Movie Actors Awards	Best Female Lead	Anne van Jogja	Nominated
2007	Indonesian Movie Actors Awards	Favourite Female Lead	Anne van Jogja	Nominated
2009	Festival Film Bandung	The Female Lead Actor is Praised for Cinema Movies	Sepuluh	Nominated

== Electoral history ==
Election	Legislative institution	Constituency	Political party	Votes	Results
2009	People's Representative Council of the Republic of Indonesia	West Java II	Gerindra Party	25,540	Elected
2014	People's Representative Council of the Republic of Indonesia	West Java II	Gerindra Party	58,758	Elected
2019	People's Representative Council of the Republic of Indonesia	West Java II	Gerindra Party	145,636	Elected
