= Film Censorship Board =

Indonesian independent media reviewing government body

- Lembaga Sensor Film

Agency overview
- Headquarters: Jakarta, Indonesia
- Agency executives: Naswardi, Chairperson; Noorca M. Massardi, Vice Chairperson
- Website: https://www.lsf.go.id/

The Film Censorship Board (Indonesian: Lembaga Sensor Film; LSF) is an independent government body responsible for reviewing, censoring, and classifying film and television content in Indonesia. It ensures that all movies, television shows, advertisements, and film promotions meet national content standards before being distributed to the public. By regulating media content, the LSF aims to protect audiences from exposure to inappropriate or harmful content.

== Key functions ==
The LSF reviews all media content to determine their suitability for public viewing. If the content contains scenes that are considered violent, sexually explicit, politically sensitive, or portrays non-educational themes (e.g. suicide as the solution), the LSF has the authority to require edits and even block the content from release.

The LSF assigns age-based ratings to films that indicate the suitable age group for viewing. The age classification considers themes like violence, language, drug use, and sexual content. The age classification are as follows:

Age Classification
Indonesian Code	Indonesian Term	English Translation	Notes
SU	Semua Umur	All Ages	Suitable for all ages
A	Anak-Anak	Children	For children aged 3–12
BO-A	Bimbingan Orang tua-Anak-anak	Parental Guidance-Children	Parental guidance for children
BO	Bimbingan Orang tua	Parental Guidance	Parental guidance for children under 13
BO-SU	Bimbingan Orang tua-Semua-Umur	Parental Guidance-All Ages	Parental guidance, suitable for all ages
R	Remaja	Teen	For teenagers aged 13–16
13+	-	-	Suitable for audiences 13 and older
D	Dewasa	Adult	Category is divided into two: 17+, 21+

For any content to be publicly shown or advertised, it must receive a Censorship Approval Certificate (STLS) from the LSF. If content fails to meet censorship standards, the LSF issues a non-approval certificate, restricting its distribution to the public. Filmmakers who disagree with censorship outcomes can engage in discussions with the censorship board. If a resolution is not reached, the issue is taken to a higher committee or a full plenary session.

Since 2017, the LSF has held the Anugerah Lembaga Sensor Film, an annual award ceremony recognizing films and TV shows that uphold censorship standards and national values.

== Organizational structure ==
The LSF board consists of 17 members in total, 12 from the public sector with expertise in fields like education, culture, law, information technology, and religion, and 5 from government institutions covering education, culture, communication, religion, and the creative economy. The board elects a chairperson and vice-chairperson; the chairperson oversees LSF operations and represents the institution.

A secretariat, led by a secretary, is tasked with administrative and technical support, handling planning, resource management, and general affairs.
