= Ungu Violet =

- Directed by: Rizal Mantovani; Rako Prijanto
- Written by: Rako Prijanto
- Screenplay by: Jujur Prananto
- Story by: Jujur Prananto
- Produced by: Raam Punjabi
- Starring: Dian Sastrowardoyo; Rizky Hanggono; Rima Melati; Syarifa Zifa; Agastya Kandou; Gary Iskak; Ade Irawan; Titi Qadarsih; Rosaline Oscar; Katinka; Niniek L. Karim
- Cinematography: Yudi Datau
- Edited by: Sastha Sunu
- Music by: Piyu
- Production company: Multivision Plus Pictures
- Distributed by: SinemArt
- Release date: June 23, 2005 (Indonesia)
- Running time: 115 minutes
- Country: Indonesia
- Language: Indonesian

Ungu Violet is Indonesian drama film in 2005 directed by Rizal Mantovani. This Multivision Plus Pictures productions film stars Dian Sastrowardoyo, Rizky Hanggono, and Rima Melati. Ungu Violet premiered in Indonesian cinemas on June 23, 2005.

== Plot ==
Lando (Rizky Hanggono) was a photographer whose fiancée had just left him. In his distress, he met a busway ticket counter girl called Kalin (Dian Sastrowardoyo). Lando's passion for life was revived, but it didn't last long. Without apparent reason, Lando left Kalin, who became very angry and heart-broken.

As time passed, Lando, still in distress, found that Kalin had become a supermodel, and saw her presence everywhere.

Lando yearned to see Kalin again and explain why he had left her. He finally got the opportunity and met Kalin, but this encounter again ended tragically as Kalin ran into an accident and turned blind. Later on, Kalin obtained a cornea donor that enabled her to see again, but she could not seem to find Lando, whom she was actually very much in love with.

== Cast ==
- Dian Sastrowardoyo as Kalin
- Rizky Hanggono as Lando
- Rima Melati as Kalin's grandmother
- Syarifa Zifa as Erlina
- Agastya Kandou as Rudi
- Gary Iskak as Riza
- Ade Irawan as Budiati
- Titi Qadarsih as Kartika
- Rosaline Oscar as Wilhelmina
- Katinka as Rara
- Niniek L. Karim as dr. Astrid
