= Tora Sudiro =

Indonesian actor

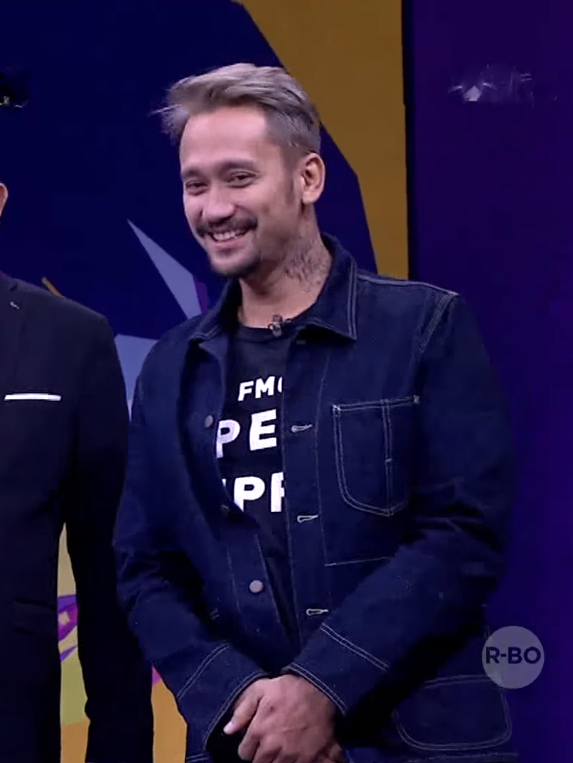
- Born: Taura Danang Sudiro; 10 May 1973 (age 53); Jakarta, Indonesia
- Other name: Tora Sudiro
- Occupations: Actor; Comedian
- Years active: 2001–present
- Height: 1.83 m (6 ft 0 in)
- Spouses: Anggraini Kadiman (1999–2009); Mieke Amalia (2009–present)
- Children: Married from Anggraini Kadiman: Azzahra Nabila; Nayara Kanahaya; Married from Mieke Amalia: Jenaka Mahila Sudiro
- Parent(s): Tanto Sudiro (father); Pinky Mardikusno (mother)
- Awards: Citra Award for Best Leading Actor

Taura Danang Sudiro or better known as Tora Sudiro (born in Jakarta, Indonesia on 10 May 1973) is an Indonesian actor and comedian of Javanese descent.

== Personal life ==
After his divorce, Tora married Mieke Amalia in 2009 with both having two children each from previous marriages. In 2012, they had a daughter.

His mother, Dyah Setyoutami, died in 2023.

== Filmography ==
=== Film ===
Year	Title	Role	Notes
2001	Tragedi	Mr. Purple Lotus	
2003	Arisan!	Sakti	Citra Award for Best Leading Actor in Indonesian Film Festival 2004
2005	Janji Joni	Gay Men in Toilet #1	
2005	Banyu Biru	Banyu	
2006	Ekspedisi Madewa	Tiro Mandawa	
2007	D'Bijis	Damon	Favorite Leading Role Actor in Indonesian Movie Awards 2007
2007	Nagabonar Jadi 2	Bonaga	Nominations Citra Award for Best Leading Actor in Indonesian Film Festival 2007; Best Leading Role Actor in Bandung Film Festival 2007; Most Favorite Actor in MTV Indonesia Movie Awards 2007
2007	Quickie Express	Jojo	
2008	Otomatis Romantis	Bambang	
2008	Namaku Dick	Bama	
2008	Tri Mas Getir	Ciang Pek	
2008	Laskar Pelangi	Mr. Mahmud	
2008	Cinlok	Cundra	
2009	Wakil Rakyat	Bagyo	
2009	Benci Disko	Harim	
2009	Krazy Crazy Krezy	Sony	
2009	Preman in Love	Sahroni	
2010	The God Babe	Riyo	
2010	Roman Picisan	Raga	
2010	Mafia Insyaf	Kendra	
2011	Perempuan-Perempuan Liar	Dom	
2011	Arisan! 2	Sakti	Nominations Best Leading Role Actor in Indonesian Movie Awards 2012; Nominations Favorite Leading Role Actor in Indonesian Movie Awards 2012
2012	Kita Versus Korupsi	Arwoko	Segment: "Selamat Siang, Risa!"; Nominations Omnibus Best Actor in Maya Cup 2012
2013	Get M4rried	Doctor	
2013	Setelah 15 Tahun	Himself	Documentary film
2013	Malam Seribu Bulan	The Lead Thug	
2013	Slank Nggak Ada Matinya	Adri	
2014	Princess, Bajak Laut dan Alien	Unknown Role	
2015	The Wedding & Bebek Betutu	Januar Edwin	
2015	3 Dara	Affandy	
2016	Juara	Karisma	
2016	Warkop DKI Reborn: Jangkrik Boss! Part 1	Indro	
2016	Ada Cinta di SMA	Ayah Iqbal	Nominations Memorable Brief Appearance (Arifin C. Noer Cup) Maya Cup 2016
2016	Cek Toko Sebelah	Robert	
2017	Warkop DKI Reborn: Jangkrik Boss! Part 2	Indro	
2018	Hoax	Raga	
2018	Gila Lu Ndro	Indro	
2019	Pretty Boys	Ladyboy	Best Scene-Stealer Indonesian Film Critics Society 2019
2020	Mangga Muda	Agil	
2020	Benyamin Biang Kerok 2	Tora Sudiro	
2020	Warkop DKI Reborn 4	Tora Sudiro	
2021	Miracle in Cell No. 7	Jaki	

=== TV series ===
Year	Title	Role
2006	Dunia Tanpa Koma	Bayu
2008	Para Pencari Tuhan	Baha
2010	Udin Bui	Boing
2011	Laki-Laki Lasut	Leo Hamonangan
2012	Tendangan Si Madun Seasons 2	Rahman
2014	Tukang Bubur Naik Haji The Series	Maul
2016	Tukang Ojek Pengkolan	Opik
2018	Babe Gue Rojali	
2019	Detektif Cinta	

== Variety shows ==
Year	Title	Channel Television
2004-2009	Extravaganza	Trans TV
2013	Eat Bulaga Indonesia	ANTV² SCTV¹
2015	Nyonya Nunung	Net TV
2017	Little Big Shots Indonesia	GTV
2019	Untung Ada Tora	iNews
2019	Detektif Cinta	Net TV
2019–now	Malam Malam	Net TV

== Model video clips ==
Year	Title Song	Singer
2003	Cinta Sudah Lewat	Kahitna
2010	Waktu Takkan Mampu	Shanty

== Awards and nominations ==
Year	Awards	Category	Film	Results
2004	Indonesian Film Festival	Citra Award for Best Leading Actor	Arisan!	Won
2007	Indonesian Film Festival	Citra Award for Best Leading Actor	Nagabonar Jadi 2	Nominated
2007	Bandung Film Festival	Best Leading Role Actor	Nagabonar Jadi 2	Won
2007	MTV Indonesia Movie Awards	Most Favorite Actor	Nagabonar Jadi 2	Won
2007	Indonesian Movie Awards	Favorite Leading Role Actor	D'Bijis	Won
2012	Indonesian Movie Awards	Best Leading Role Actor	Arisan! 2	Nominated
2012	Indonesian Movie Awards	Favorite Leading Role Actor	Arisan! 2	Nominated
2012	Maya Award	Best Actor in an Omnibus	Kita Versus Korupsi	Nominated
2013	Maya Award	Best Actress in an Omnibus	Rectoverso	Nominated
2014	Maya Award	Best Actor in an Omnibus	Princess, Bajak Laut & Alien	Won
2016	Maya Award	Memorable Brief Appearance (Arifin C. Noer Cup)	Ada Cinta di SMA	Nominated
2019	Indonesia Film Critics Society	Best Scene-Stealer	Pretty Boys	Won
