= Mengejar Matahari =

2004 drama film by Rudi Soedjarwo

- Film poster
- Directed by: Rudy Soedjarwo
- Written by: Titien Wattimena
- Produced by: Mitzy Christina; Cindy Christina; Ferick Maliki; Dian Hehanussa
- Cinematography: Ipung Rachmat Syaiful
- Edited by: Sastha Sunu
- Music by: Ari Lasso; Andi Rianto
- Production company: Kipas Communication
- Distributed by: SinemArt
- Release date: 22 July 2004
- Running time: 86 minutes
- Country: Indonesia
- Language: Indonesian

Mengejar Matahari (English: Chasing the Sun) is a 2004 Indonesian coming-of-age drama film directed by Rudy Soedjarwo. It was shown at the International Film Festival Rotterdam in 2005.

Mengejar Matahari is a coming-of-age story of four childhood friends living in a Jakarta ghetto whose bonds are tested as they grow into adulthood.
