= Nia Dinata =

Indonesian film director

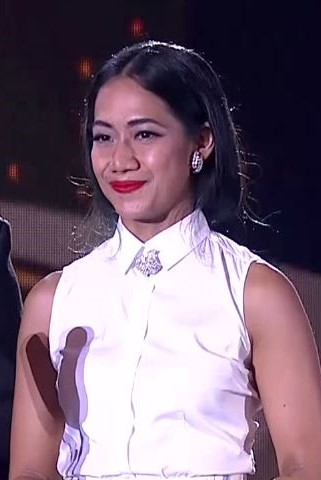
- Dinata in 2015
- Born: Nurkurniati Aisyah Dewi; 4 March 1970 (age 56); Djakarta, Indonesia
- Education: Elizabethtown College
- Occupations: Director, producer, screenwriter
- Years active: 1998–present
- Notable work: Ca-bau-kan; Arisan!; Berbagi Suami; Biola Tak Berdawai

Nurkurniati Aisyah Dewi (born 4 March 1970 in Jakarta, Indonesia), better known as Nia Dinata, is an Indonesian film director. Her movies are known for tackling subjects controversial or "risky" in Indonesia such as homosexuality, migrant workers, and polygamy.

Dinata began her film career directing video clips and commercials in the mid-1990s until directing the made-for-television Mencari Pelangi in 1998. Three years later, she directed her first feature film, Ca-bau-kan, after founding her own production house. The next film she directed, 2003's Arisan!, was critically acclaimed and one of her most successful works. Her third directorial effort, 2006's Berbagi Suami, was controversial yet successful.

Dinata has faced heavy censorship and controversy in Indonesia because of the subjects she covers. However, she has also won critical acclaim internationally, being called Indonesia's "most talented new filmmaker" in 2006. Two of the films she direct have been submitted to the Academy Award for Best Foreign Language Film.

== Biography ==
Dinata was born Nurkurniati Aisyah Dewi in Jakarta on 4 March 1970. As a child, Dinata watched movies weekly. After finishing high school, she received a bachelor's degree in mass communications from Elizabethtown College in Elizabethtown, Pennsylvania, where she became interested in cinematography. She then took a filmmaking course at New York University. After returning to Indonesia, she took her first job as an apprentice reporter for Seputar Indonesia. She later began directing video clips and commercials with Iguana Productions in the mid-1990s, studying the techniques on her own.

Dinata made her directorial debut with the 1998 made-for-television film Mencari Pelangi (Looking for the Rainbow), which won two national awards. She then started her own production company, Kalyana Shira Film, around 1999. Her first feature film, Ca-bau-kan, was produced by Kalyana Shira and dealt with the trials and tribulations of Chinese Indonesians in pre-independence Indonesia. After being trimmed from its original running time of 160 minutes to 124 minutes for commercial viability, the film—adapted from the novel by Remy Sylado—was critically panned; Dinata herself was satisfied, saying it was "as good as it could be for that short running time". She produced Sekar Ayu Asmara's debut, Biola Tak Berdawai, the following year.

The next film she directed, 2003's Arisan! (The Gathering), had gay themes and was produced on a small budget. It is considered one of her more commercially successful films, being seen by over 500,000 people, and the first Indonesian film dealing with homosexuality. Its success surprised her, as most of the commercially successful films at the time were horrors and children's films.

After the success of Arisan!, Dinata was able to find more sponsors for her movies. In 2004, she was invited to join the Cannes Young Directors Program, and the following year she produced Joko Anwar's directorial debut Janji Joni (Joni's Promise). Another film she directed, 2006's Berbagi Suami (Love for Share), about polygamy in Indonesia, was based on her personal experiences when her father took a second wife.

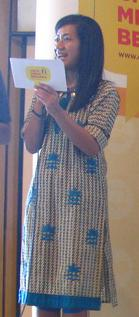
Dinata in 2011

In 2007, Dinata produced Quickie Express, described in the press as a sex comedy but by Dinata herself as a "love story with social content". This was followed by the short-film collection Perempuan Punya Cerita (Chants of Lotus), which featured one directed by her, Gara-Gara Bola (Soccer Riot), which she produced, and the documentary Pertaruhan (At Stake).

In 2009, Dinata and the Kalyana Shira Foundation she runs started the Indonesian International Children's Film Festival. The festival showcases both local and international children's films and involves children in all aspects of the festival. As of 2011, it has been run three times.

As of April 2011, Dinata is producing a sequel to Arisan!. Filming was expected to begin in May, with the release scheduled for 1 December 2011, eight years after the first instalment. In 2011 Dinata also collaborated with Ucu Agustin on Batik: Our Love Story, a documentary on the traditional textile batik. Dinata directed, while Ucu served as screenwriter.

== Controversy ==
Dinata's works, dealing with issues that are often at odds with the social values of the Muslim-majority Indonesia, have been controversial. After the success of Arisan!, she began receiving hate mail that accused her of promoting homosexuality and said that she was going to hell. During the promotional tour for Berbagi Suami, she was accosted by a male audience in Makassar, who disagreed with the perceived anti-polygamy message in the film and stated that she had clearly not researched Islam's views on the practice. Another film she produced, Long Road to Heaven, was banned in Bali for a time for its depiction of the 2002 Bali bombings. Despite the controversies arising from her works, Dinata has stated that she will never practice self-censorship.

Although the versions of her works released in theatres and on DVD are censored (the censorship being her "biggest challenge"), Dinata holds onto the original cuts for special viewings. Having dealt with censorship since the beginning of her career and fighting against it in the Constitutional Court of Indonesia in 2007, Dinata continues to argue against laws permitting film censorship.

== Style ==
Dinata focuses on the "little people" and her films are often social commentaries. She also includes a female perspective of gender issues in her works. She considers herself an independent filmmaker, and values feature-length films over television shows and commercials. Jane Perlez, writing for The New York Times, has noted that Dinata is "more art house than Hollywood", showing fearlessness in addressing pressing Indonesian social issues.

Although she enjoys watching teen movies like Clueless and Cruel Intentions, she does not intend to direct any as she "wouldn't have the passion".

== Awards and recognition ==
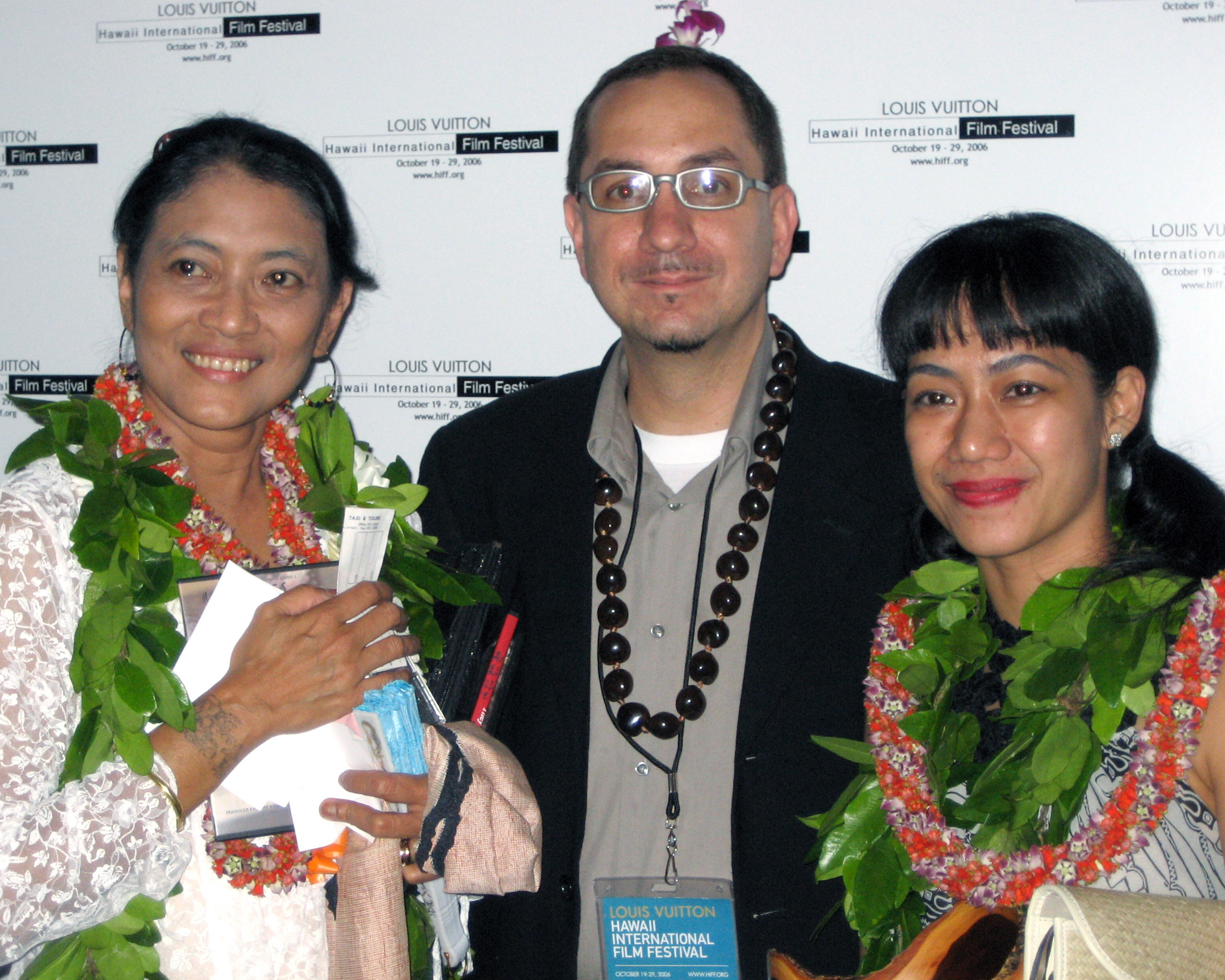
Dinata (right) at the Hawaii International Film Festival with Jajang C. Noer (left)

Perlez described Dinata as Indonesia's "most talented new filmmaker" in 2006. Two of the films she directed (Ca-bau-kan and Berbagi Suami) and one she produced (Biola Tak Berdawai) were submitted for the Academy Award for Best Foreign Language Film.

- 2004 Citra Award for Best Film for Arisan!
- 2004 MTV Indonesia Movie Awards for "Best Director" for Arisan!
- 2006 Hawaii International Film Festival for Best Feature Love for Share

== Awards and nominations ==
Year	Award	Category	Recipients	Result
2004	MTV Indonesia Movie Awards	Best Director	Arisan!	Won
2004	Indonesian Film Festival	Citra Award for Best Director	Arisan!	Nominated
2006	Indonesian Film Festival	Citra Award for Best Director	Berbagi Suami	Nominated

== Personal life ==
She is married to a computer engineer and has two children. She also enjoys watching movies and is a fan of Woody Allen.

== Filmography ==
As director

- Ca-bau-kan (The Courtesan; 2002)
- Arisan! (The Gathering; 2003)
- Berbagi Suami (Love for Share; 2006)
- Perempuan Punya Cerita (Chants of Lotus) (2008)
- Arisan! 2 (The Gathering 2; 2011)
- Ini Kisah Tiga Dara (Three Sassy Sisters; 2016)
- A World Without (2021)
- Suka Duka Berduka (2022)

As writer

- Arisan! (The Gathering; 2003)
- Berbagi Suami (Love for Share; 2006)
- Meraih Mimpi (Chasing Dreams; 2009; an adaptation of Sing to the Dawn)
- Arisan! 2 (The Gathering 2; 2011)

As producer

- Ca-bau-kan (The Courtesan; 2002)
- Biola Tak Berdawai (The Stringless Violin; 2003)
- Janji Joni (Joni's Promise; 2005)
- Quickie Express (2007)
- Long Road to Heaven (2007)
- Perempuan Punya Cerita (Chants of Lotus) (2008)
- Pertaruhan (At Stake) (2008)
- Madame X (2010)
- Tanah Mama (Mother's Land) (2015)
