= 2016 Indonesian Film Festival =

Award ceremony for Indonesian films of 2016

Indonesian Film Festival
- Date: 6 November 2016
- Site: Teater Jakarta, Ismail Marzuki Park, Central Jakarta, Jakarta, Indonesia
- Hosted by: Pandji Pragiwaksono; Ernest Prakasa

Highlights
- Best Picture: Athirah
- Most awards: Athirah (6)
- Most nominations: Athirah and Rudy Habibie (10)

Television coverage
- Network: RCTI

The 36th Indonesian Film Festival ceremony took place on 6 November 2016 at the Teater Jakarta in Jakarta, Indonesia, to honor the achievement in Indonesian cinema of 2016. It was hosted by comedians Pandji Pragiwaksono and Ernest Prakasa and broadcast on RCTI. Beginning with this ceremony, Best Theme Song, was introduced to honour achievement in music.

Riri Riza's biographical drama film Athirah won the most awards with six, including Best Picture. Other winners include My Stupid Boss and Salawaku with three, Ada Apa Dengan Cinta? 2 and Headshot with two.

== Development ==
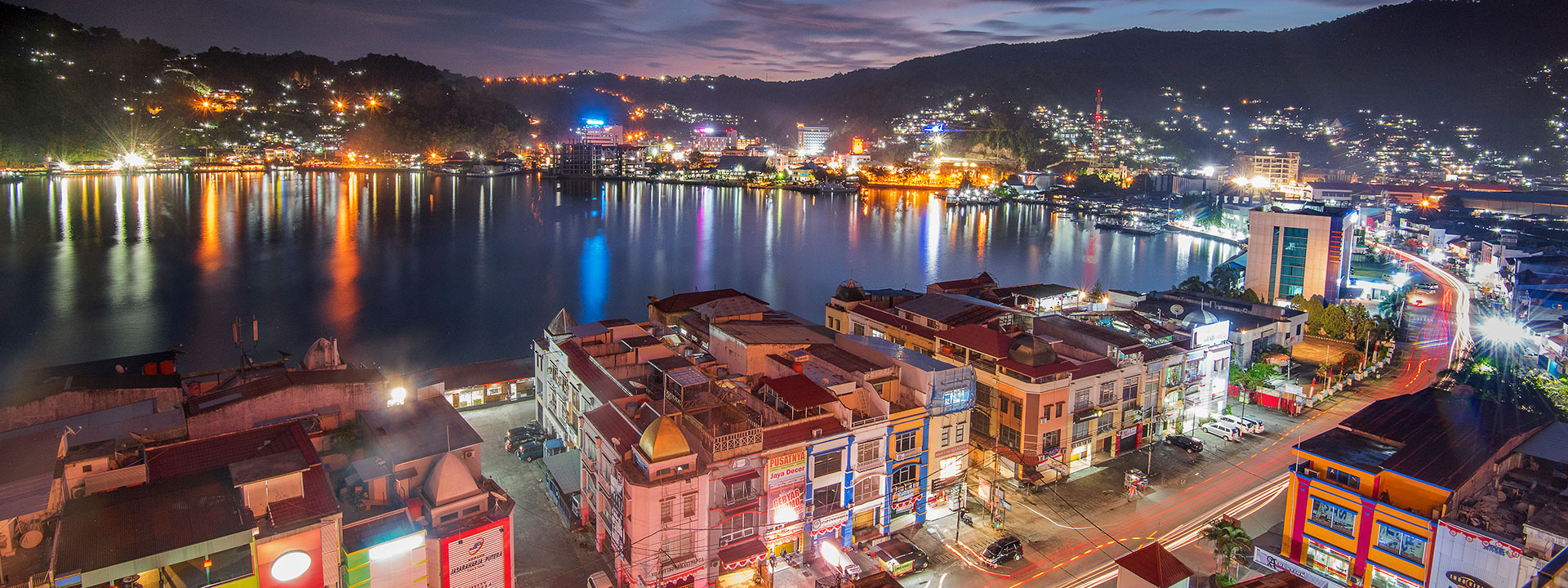
2016 initial host city, Jayapura.

The 2016 ceremony was initially set to be held in Jayapura, Papua. However, the plan was cancelled due to financial and technical issues. On 8 September 2016, the committee agreed to hold the ceremony at Ismail Marzuki Park, Central Jakarta.

Notable events were held prior to the ceremony. It opened with the screening of the restoration of Tiga Dara (1956) on 3 August. An art installation of FFI was showcased at Neo Soho, West Jakarta, Indonesia.

== Winners and nominations ==
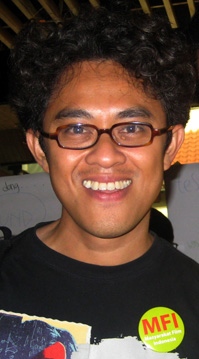
Riri Riza, Best Director winner

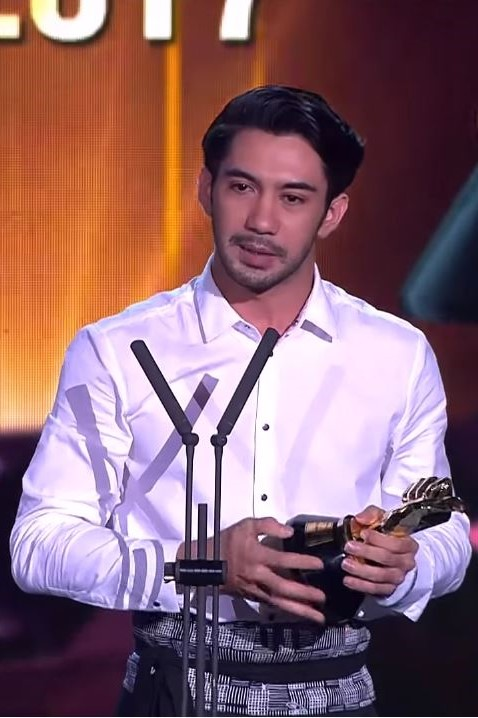
Reza Rahadian, Best Actor winner

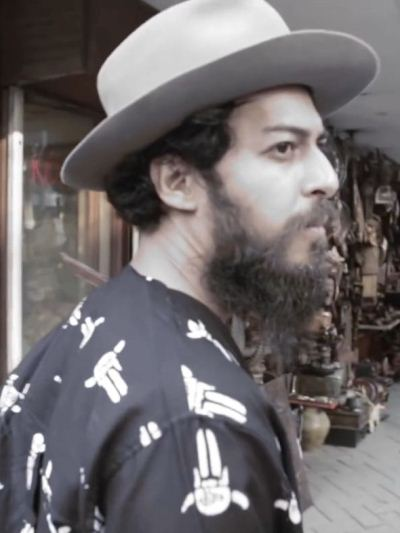
Alex Abbad, Best Supporting Actor winner

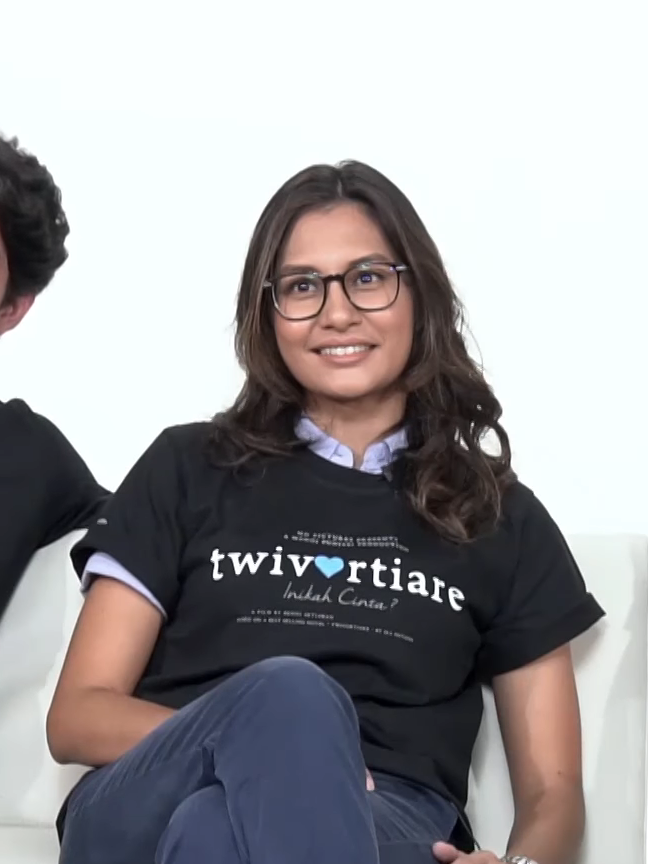
Raihaanun, Best Supporting Actress winner

The nominations were announced on 14 October 2016 at the Plaza Indonesia, Central Jakarta. Athirah and Rudy Habibie received the most nominations with ten.

Winners are listed first, highlighted in boldface, and indicated with a double dagger (‡).

**Best Picture**: **Athirah – Mira Lesmana**‡; Aisyah: Biarkan Kami Bersaudara – Hamdani Koestoro; Letters from Prague – Angga Dwimas Sasongko, Anggia Kharisma, Handoko Hendroyono, and Chicco Jerikho; Rudy Habibie – Manoj Punjabi; Salawaku – Ray Zulham and Michael Julius	**Best Director**: **Riri Riza – Athirah**‡; Pritagita Aryanegara – Salawaku; Upi Avianto – My Stupid Boss; Yosep Anggi Noen – Solo, Solitude; Kimo Stamboel and Timo Tjahjanto – Headshot
**Best Actor**: **Reza Rahadian – My Stupid Boss as Boss Man**‡; Abimana Aryasatya – Warkop DKI Reborn: Jangkrik Boss! Part 1 as Dono; Vino G. Bastian – Warkop DKI Reborn: Jangkrik Boss! Part 1 as Kasino; Reza Rahadian – Rudy Habibie as B. J. Habibie; Tio Pakusadewo – Letters from Prague as Jaya	**Best Actress**: **Cut Mini – Athirah as Athirah Kalla**‡; Sha Ine Febriyanti – Nay as Nay; Atiqah Hasiholan – Wonderful Life as Amalia; Christine Hakim – Ibu Maafkan Aku as Hartini; Chelsea Islan – Rudy Habibie as Ilona Ianovska
**Best Supporting Actor**: **Alex Abbad – My Stupid Boss as Dika**‡; Arman Dewarti – Athirah as Puang Haji Kalla; Arie Kriting – Aisyah: Biarkan Kami Bersaudara as Pedro; Adi Kurdi – Catatan Dodol Calon Dokter as Professor Burhan; JFlow Matulessy – Salawaku as Kawanua	**Best Supporting Actress**: **Raihaanun – Salawaku as Binaiya**‡; Lydia Kandou – Aisyah: Biarkan Kami Bersaudara as Aisyah's mother; Sissy Priscillia – Ada Apa Dengan Cinta? 2 as Milly; Titiek Puspa – Three Sassy Sisters as Oma; Widyawati – Letters from Prague as Sulastri
**Best Original Screenplay**: **Aisyah: Biarkan Kami Bersaudara – Jujur Prananto**‡; Solo, Solitude – Yosep Anggi Noen; Talak 3 – Bagus Bramanti; Tales of the Otherwords – B. W. Purbanegara; There Is Love in High School – Haqi Achmad and Patrick Effendy	**Best Adapted Screenplay**: **Athirah – Salman Aristo and Riri Riza; based on the novel by Alberthiene Endah**‡; Catatan Dodol Calon Dokter – Ardiansyah Solaiman and Chadijah Masturi Siregar; based on the novel by Ferdiriva Hamzah; My Stupid Boss – Upi Avianto; based on the novel by Chaos@Work; Ngenest – Ernest Prakasa; based on his novel; Rudy Habibie – Gina S. Noer and Hanung Bramantyo; based on the novel Rudy: Kisah Masa Muda Sang Visioner by Noer
**Best Documentary Feature**: **Gesang Sang Maestro Keroncong – Marselli Sumarno**‡; Indonesia Kirana – Febian Nurrahman Saktinegara; Masean's Messages – Dwitra J. Ariana; Nokas – Manuel Alberto Maia; Petani Terakhir – Dwitra J. Ariana	**Best Documentary Short Film**: **Mama Amamapare – Yonri S. Revolt and Febian Kakisina**‡; 1.180 MDPL – Muhammad Mirza and Ahmalul Fauzan; Di Kaliurang – Fransiscus Magastowo; Tarung – Steve Pillar Setiabudi; Wasis – Ima Puspita Sari
**Best Live Action Short Film**: **Prenjak – Wregas Bhanuteja**‡; Kitorang Basudara – Ninndi Raras; Memoria – Kamila Andini; On the Origin of Fear – Bayu Prihantoro Filemon; Pangreh – Harvan Agustriansyah	**Best Animated Short Film**: **Surat untuk Jakarta – Andre Sugianto, Aditya Prabaswara, and Ardhira Anugrah Putra**‡; Adit Sopo Jarwo: Eyang Datang Semua Senang – Indrajaya and Omar Aryaindra; Adit Sopo Jarwo: Festival Perahu Kertas Belayar Tanpa Batas – Indrajaya and Omar Aryaindra; Ang – Robert Sunny; Reform – M. Ramza Ardyputra
**Best Cinematography**: **Salawaku – Faozan Rizal**‡; 3 Heroines – Ipung Rachmat Syaiful; Aisyah: Biarkan Kami Bersaudara – Edi Santoso; Athirah – Yadi Sugandi; Letters from Prague – Ivan Anwal Pane	**Best Art Direction**: **Athirah – Eros Eflin**‡; Headshot – Iqbal Marjono; My Stupid Boss – Ade Gimbal; Rudy Habibie – Allan Sebastian; The Window – Edy Wibowo
**Best Visual Effects**: **Headshot – Andi Novianto**‡; Bangkit! – Raiyan Laksamana; Comic 8: Casino Kings Part 2 – Eric Kawilarang, Andi Wijaya, and Pawan Sanjaya; Warkop DKI Reborn: Jangkrik Boss! Part 1 – Eric Kawilarang, Andi Wijaya, and Pawan Sanjaya; Wonderful Life – Fixit	**Best Film Editing**: **My Stupid Boss – Wawan I. Wibowo**‡; Ada Apa Dengan Cinta? 2 – W. Ichwandiardono; Letters from Prague – Ahsan Andrian; Rudy Habibie – Wawan I. Wibowo; Three Sassy Sisters – Aline Jusria
**Best Sound**: **Headshot – Fajar Yuskemal, Aria Prayogi, and M. Ichsan Rachmaditta**‡; Athirah – Satrio Budiono; I Am Hope – Satrio Budiono; Rudy Habibie – Satrio Budiono and Khikmawan Santosa; There Is Love in High School – Khikmawan Santosa and Mohamad Ikhsan Sungkar	**Best Costume Design**: **Athirah – Chitra Subyakto**‡; Ada Apa Dengan Cinta? 2 – Chitra Subyakto; My Stupid Boss – Quartini Sari; Rudy Habibie – Retno Ratih Damayanti; Three Sassy Sisters – Tania Soeprapto
**Best Original Score**: **Ada Apa Dengan Cinta? 2 – Anto Hoed and Melly Goeslaw**‡; Letters from Prague – Thoersi Argeswara; Nay – Zeke Khaseli and Yudhi Arfani; Rudy Habibie – Tya Subiakto and Krisna Purna; Salawaku – Thoersi Argeswara	**Best Theme Song**: **"Ratusan Purnama" from Ada Apa Dengan Cinta? 2 – Music and Lyrics by Anto Hoed and Melly Goeslaw; Performed by Marthino Lio and Goeslaw**‡; "Bangkit!" from Bangkit! – Music, Lyrics and Performed by Nidji; "Imaji Sunyi" from Salawaku – Music and Lyrics by Nico Veryandi; Performed by Karina Salim; "Mencari Cinta Sejati" from Rudy Habibie – Music and Lyrics by Anto Hoed; Performed by Cakra Khan; "Ruang Bahagia" from Athirah – Music, Lyrics and Performed by Endah N Rhesa
**Best Child Performer**: **Elko Kastanya – Salawaku as Salawaku**‡; Adryan Bima – Bangkit! as Dwi; Christabelle Grace Marbun – Kartini and Mr. Postman as Ningrum; Dionisius Rivaldo Moruk – Aisyah: Biarkan Kami Bersaudara as Siku Tavarez; Sinyo Riza – Wonderful Life as Aqil	**Lifetime Achievement Award**: **Christine Hakim**‡

=== Films with multiple nominations and awards ===
Films that received multiple nominations
Nominations	Film
10	Athirah
10	Rudy Habibie
7	Salawaku
6	Aisyah: Biarkan Kami Bersaudara
6	Letters from Prague
6	My Stupid Boss
5	Ada Apa Dengan Cinta? 2
4	Headshot
3	Bangkit!
3	Three Sassy Sisters
3	Warkop DKI Reborn: Jangkrik Boss! Part 1
3	Wonderful Life
2	Catatan Dodol Calon Dokter
2	Nay
2	Solo, Solitude
2	There Is Love in High School

Films that received multiple awards
Awards	Film
6	Athirah
3	My Stupid Boss
3	Salawaku
2	Ada Apa Dengan Cinta? 2
2	Headshot
