= Rangga & Cinta =

2025 teen musical film by Riri Riza

- Theatrical release poster
- Directed by: Riri Riza
- Written by: Mira Lesmana; Titien Wattimena
- Based on: What's Up with Love? by: Rudi Soedjarwo; Jujur Prananto; Prima Rusdi; Rako Prijanto; Riri Riza
- Produced by: Mira Lesmana; Nicholas Saputra; Toto Prasetyanto
- Starring: El Putra Sarira; Leya Princy
- Cinematography: Vera Lestafa
- Edited by: Aline Jusria
- Music by: Anto Hoed; Melly Goeslaw
- Production company: Miles Films
- Distributed by: Primeworks Studios (Malaysia)
- Release dates: 18 September 2025 (Busan); 2 October 2025 (Indonesia)
- Running time: 119 minutes
- Country: Indonesia
- Language: Indonesian

Rangga & Cinta is a 2025 Indonesian teen musical romance film directed by Riri Riza and a remake of the 2002 film What's Up with Love? directed by Rudi Soedjarwo. The film stars El Putra Sarira and Leya Princy in their feature film debuts as the two titular roles.

The film had its world premiere at the 30th Busan International Film Festival on 18 September 2025. It was released theatrically in Indonesia on 2 October 2025.

== Premise ==
Set in 2001, Rangga & Cinta follows Cinta, a popular high school student who becomes interested in Rangga, an introverted student who wins the school's poetry contest. Then, she begins to develop feelings for him.

== Cast ==
- El Putra Sarira as Rangga
- Leya Princy as Cinta
- Jasmine Nadya as Alya
- Katyana Mawira as Milly
- Kyandra Sembel as Maura
- Daniella Tumiwa as Karmen
- Rafly Altama as Mamet
- Rafi Sudirman as Borne
- Faris Fadjar as Borne's Gang
- Ben Prihadi as Borne's Gang
- Albian as Borne's Gang
- Joseph Kara as Yusrizal
- Hakim Ahmad as Mr. Wardiman
- Irgi Fahrezi as Cinta's Father
- Anita Rahayu as Cinta's Mother
- Yosep Anggi Noen as Mr. Taufik
- Boris Bokir as Limbong
- Gerald Situmorang as Rama
- Andovi da Lopez as basketball referee
- Yaneke Anggoro as Alya's Mother
- Keenan Avalokita as Rangga's deskmate
- Tika Gandrung as Librarian
- Robinsar Simanjuntak as Airport Security

== Production ==
Following the release of Ada Apa Dengan Cinta? 2 in 2016, director Riri Riza hinted at the possibility of a third installment. In May 2024, producer Mira Lesmana stated that the idea of a musical remake was conceived during the COVID-19 pandemic, initially envisioned as a series. An open casting took place in June 2024. Nicholas Saputra, who portrayed Rangga in the original film, served as a producer on this film, marking his feature producing debut. Barunson E&A and Imajinari financed the film.

In February 2025, the cast of the film was announced. Riza revealed that the casting process lasted six months. Principal photography concluded in March 2025.

== Music ==
In March 2025, it was reported that Anto Hoed and Melly Goeslaw returned to compose the score and write new songs, having previously worked on the original film.

Musicians Eva Celia and Bilal Indrajaya released the film's theme song, "Rangga & Cinta", on 20 August 2025.

Songs performed in the film include:

- "Kubahagia" - Chorus
- "Di Mana Malumu" - Cinta, Alya, Milly, Maura, and Karmen
- "Untuk Rangga"^ - Cinta
- "Truly, Madly, Deeply Hate You" - Borne
- "Bimbang" - Cinta
- "Di Mana Cinta"^ - Alya, Milly, Maura, and Karmen
- "Ingin Mencintai dan Dicintai" - Cinta
- "Tentang Seseorang" - Rangga and Cinta
- "Suara Hati Seorang Kekasih" - Rangga and Cinta
- "Demikianlah" - Chorus
- "Rangga Cinta"^ - Eva Celia and Bilal Indrajaya

^These new songs written in collaboration with Mira Lesmana.

== Release ==
Rangga & Cinta had its world premiere at the 30th Busan International Film Festival on 18 September 2025 at A Window on Asian Cinema section. The film was theatrically released in Indonesia on 2 October 2025. Vidio acquired the distribution rights to the film, releasing it on 13 February 2026.

== Accolades ==
Award / Film Festival	Date of ceremony	Category	Recipient(s)	Result	Ref.
Indonesian Film Festival	20 November 2025	Best Sound	Satrio Budiono and Ichsan Rachmaditta	Nominated	
Indonesian Film Festival	20 November 2025	Nya' Abbas Akup Award for Favorite Film	Riri Riza	Won	
Indonesian Film Festival	20 November 2025	Rachmat Hidajat Award for Favorite Actor	El Putra Sarira	Won	
Indonesian Film Festival	20 November 2025	Mieke Widjaja Award for Favorite Actress	Leya Princy	Won	
Jogja-NETPAC Asian Film Festival	6 December 2025	Indonesian Screen Award for Best Music	Anto Hoed and Melly Goeslaw	Won	
Festival Film Bandung	22 August 2026	Highly Commended Original Score	Anto Hoed and Melly Goeslaw	Nominated	
Anugerah Musik Indonesia	4 November 2026	Best Song from a Musical	"Kubahagia" performed by the High School Ensemble and cast of Rangga & Cinta	Nominated	
Anugerah Musik Indonesia	4 November 2026	Best Visual Media Production Work	Bilal Indrajaya and Eva Celia for "Rangga Cinta"	Nominated	
