= A Diary of A Demonstrator =

1983 book by Soe Hok Gie

- Book cover, first edition
- Author: Soe Hok Gie
- Original title: Catatan Seorang Demonstran
- Language: Indonesian
- Publisher: LP3ES
- Publication date: 1 May 1983
- ISBN: 978-9794444221

Catatan Seorang Demonstran (Indonesian for Annotations of a Demonstrator) or Catatan Harian Seorang Demonstran (Indonesian for The Diaries of A Demonstrator) is the diary of Indonesian activist Soe Hok Gie, published in 1983.

This book briefly appeared in a scene of the film What's Up with Love? and was later made into a movie directed by Riri Riza.

When the 2005 film about Soe Hok Gie's life (entitled Gie) debuted, this book was republished with Nicholas Saputra’s face on the cover, who portrays Soe Hok Gie in the film.

It is collected from several diaries and covers the life of Soe Hok Gie from around the end of his childhood until several days before his death at the age of 26 in 1969. The book is notable for its first hand account of the Indonesian political turmoil in the 1960s, at the end of President Sukarno's era leading to the birth of the Orde Baru (New Order) under General Suharto.
