= Sherina Munaf =

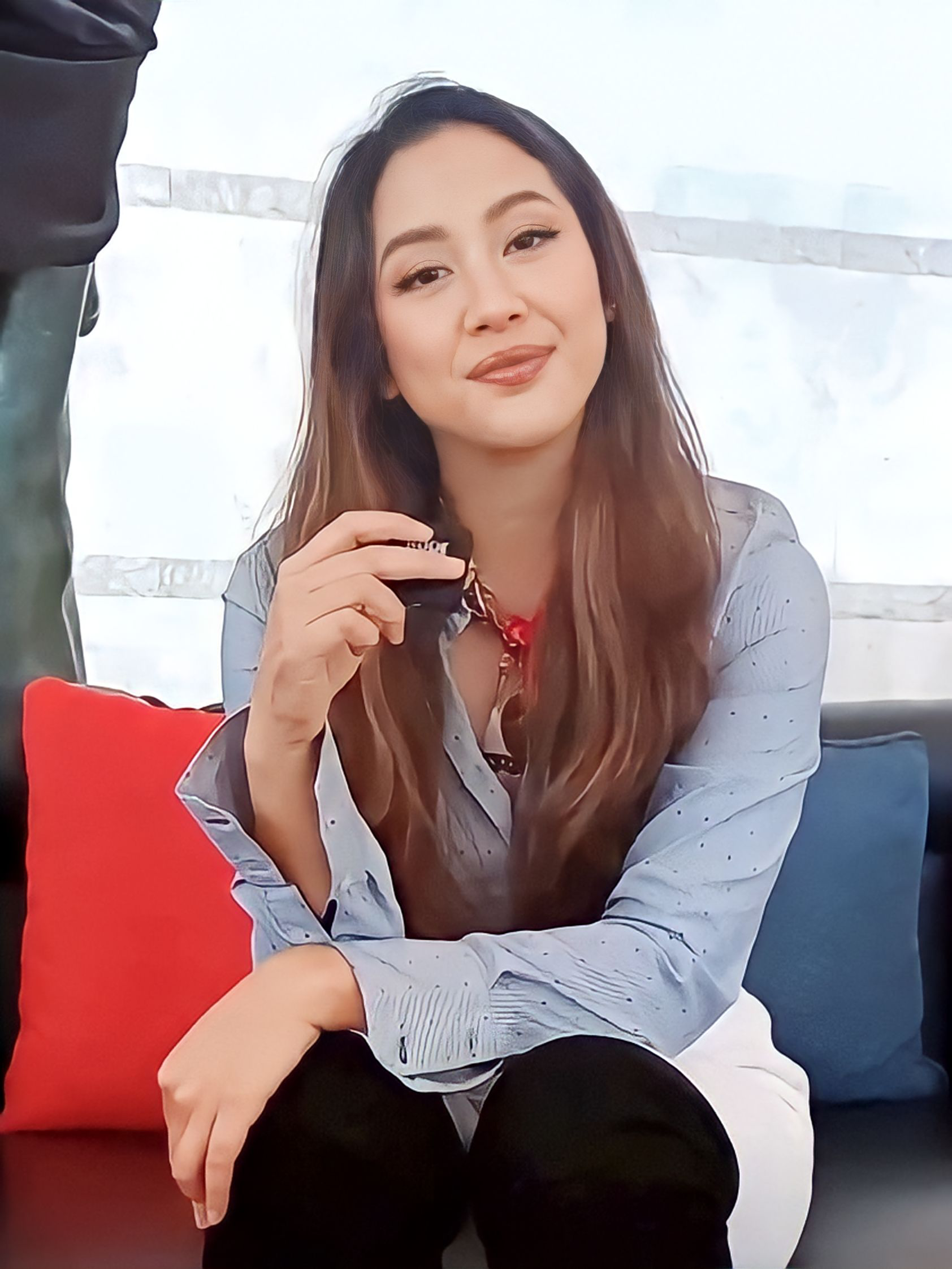
- Sherina in 2023

Background information
- Also known as: Sherina Munaf
- Born: Sinna Sherina Munaf; 11 June 1990 (age 36) Bandung, West Java, Indonesia
- Genres: Pop; R&B; Pop rock
- Occupations: Actress dancer singer songwriter pianist
- Instruments: Vocals piano
- Years active: 1999–present
- Labels: Ceepee Production; Miles Films; Trinity Optima Production
- Website: sherinamunaf.com

Sinna Sherina Munaf or better known as Sherina Munaf (born 11 June 1990) is an Indonesian actress, singer and songwriter of Minangkabau descent. She is the niece of Indonesian singer-songwriter, Fariz RM.

== Early life ==
Sinna Sherina Munaf was born on 11 June 1990, the second child of Triawan Munaf and Luki Ariani. As a child, she enjoyed painting and singing. Her parents arranged for her to have singing lessons from Elfa Secioria.

In 1997, she won a karaoke contest in Jakarta, followed by victory in a second singing contest in 1998.

== Career ==
=== 1990–2001: The beginnings and Petualangan Sherina ===
In 1999, at the age of nine, Sherina made her debut album Andai Aku Besar Nanti (When I Grow Up) under Tantowi Yahya's label Ceepee Productions. The album went Platinum, selling over 250,000 copies and won two Indonesian Music Awards for Best Child Song and Best Children's Album.

In 2000, Sherina's father, Triawan Munaf, collaborated with Mira Lesmana to produce the movie Petualangan Sherina (Sherina's Adventure), which directed by Riri Riza and gained wide theatrical release in Indonesia. The soundtrack of Sherina's Adventure also gave the youngster another hit album. According to Ceepee Productions record company, it went Platinum by the end of August, with sales of more than 200,000 copies and revenues of $387,000.

The album Petualangan Sherina won Indonesian Music Awards for Best Child Song and Best Children's Album plus Best Child Singer. Sherina also won Most Favorite Child Artist from Bobo (in Indonesian) twice in a row (1999 and 2000). In 2000, Asia Pacific Film Festival gave her a Special Jury Award as the Talented Child Actress. Despite her talents on the big screen, Sherina preferred to be known as 'just a singer'.

An article in Asiaweek magazine described her as Asian News Maker of the year 2000. She was interviewed by BBC London, which gained the attention of Westlife, who would duet with her on "I Have a Dream" for the Asian market. Gumilang Ramadhan (general manager of Sony BMG Indonesia) said, "part of the profit from the sales will be given to Indonesian children through an international charity foundation".

In 2001, Sherina was interviewed by Hong Kong TV network Star TV on its "Focus Asia" program, in which she was named a Princess of Pop by Adrian Brown. She appeared in numerous TV commercials and was sent by the WWF (World Wide Fund for Nature) to Japan for an orangutan awareness campaign: Borneo Orangutan Survival. Sherina was nominated as the Most Preferred Kid Actress and TV Talent based on National Kid Market Survey by Frontier Marketing and Research Consultant. Also on the same year, she recorded a cover of "I Have A Dream" with Irish boyband Westlife to raise funds for UNICEF and received a special award in the "Most Talented Child Artist" category in the 2001 Asia Pacific Film Festival in Hanoi for her performance. At the end of 2001, Sherina was named the Most Shining Star Child by RCTI.

In June 2001, Sherina sang "Simfoni Raya", written by Guruh Sukarnoputra for his album Bakti dan Persembahanku, released to celebrate the centenary anniversary of the birth of Indonesia's founding president Sukarno.

=== 2002–2004: My Life ===
In 2002, Sherina released her third album, titled "My Life". This album showed Sherina shifting from childhood songs toward teenage themes. The album's singles are "My Life", "Click Clock", and "Aku Beranjak Dewasa" (I Grew Up). It also features a song written by Sherina, "Kisah Sang Lebah" (Bee Story).

=== 2007–2014: Primadona, Gemini, and Tuna ===
To shed her child star image, Sherina signed to Trinity Optima Productions and released her fourth album, Primadona, on 14 March 2007, spewing out two singles: Sendiri and Ku Disini. 7 of the tracks of her fourth album were written solely by Sherina herself. Slank veteran Abdee Negara was recruited to play guitar chords for Sendiri. Before she released her fifth album, Gemini, on 9 July 2009, she created two soundtrack singles in 2008: Jalan Cinta for Ayat-Ayat Cinta and KuBahagia for Laskar Pelangi. Both soundtracks appeared on Gemini, which spewed three singles: Cinta Pertama dan Terakhir, Geregetan (technically a cover of her father's song from his band days) and Pergilah Kau. Around 2007–2010, she became brand ambassador for Panasonic, Casio, and Maybelline New York.

Sherina was an ambassador at the World Youth Conference, One Young World, in Zurich, Switzerland, in September 2011. She performed the Sing Your Mind, written specially for the event. In February 2013, she became a judge and coach on the Indonesian version of The Voice, and released her first mini album entitled Tuna. It spawned three singles: Sebelum Selamanya, Akan KuTunggu, and Apakah Ku Jatuh Cinta (a collaboration with labelmate Vidi Aldiano). After the album's release, she went to Australia for studying Science at University of Sydney, and Japan for studying Japanese language and animation.

=== 2018–2023: Wiro Sableng, Earwig and the Witch and Petualangan Sherina 2 ===
In 2017, Sherina was cast as Anggini, a female warrior trained under guidance of Dewa Tuak for Fox International Productions and Lifelike Pictures collaboration Wiro Sableng (212 Warrior). The film was released on 30 August 2018 to critical acclaim. In 2019, she was cast as Earwig's mother in Studio Ghibli's Earwig and the Witch as well as composing the theme song Don't Disturb Me alongside Hiroki Kamemoto of Glim Spanky, Kiyokazu Takano of Mrs. Green Apple, and Kavka Shishido. The movie was released as a television film on NHK on 30 December 2020, followed by planned theatrical release in 2021.

On 3 November 2020, she married Indonesian actor and male model, Baskara Mahendra.

In 2021, Sherina and the other cast and producers of Petualangan Sherina (Sherina's Adventure) announced the sequel of the 2000 cult film, with Sherina confirmed to fill in the role of music producer alongside her elder sister Virania, filling Elfa Secioria's seat as Elfa died in 2011. The film will be released theatrically on 28 September 2023.

== Artistry ==
=== Acting stardom ===
Before achieving success as a child singer, Sherina's nascent acting skills had attracted the attention of the Miles Production film company, which thought she would fit nicely into a musical they were planning, called Vera and Elmo's Adventure, to be directed by Riri Riza. Producer Mira Lesmana recalled: "We set out to make a film for Indonesian families. They don't want serious, heavy stuff. The important thing was to produce something that was entertaining and would make families feel good about the Indonesian cinema again." Shooting began in November 1999, with Sherina as the young lead.

As the storyline was being finalized, Andai Aku Besar Nanti was released, catapulting Sherina to an established name. She was now bigger than the movie, which was re-titled Sherina's Adventure. It tells the story of a musically gifted girl, very much like Sherina, who moves with her family from Jakarta to Bandung. When a classmate is kidnapped in a business dispute, the diminutive heroine sets out to free him. The simplicity of the story and its old-fashioned family entertainment made it a popular film during the period of Indonesia's transition from an authoritarian regime to democracy.

Released in June 2000, Sherina's Adventure sold 1.4 million tickets in six months and earned an estimated $723,000 from a budget of $241,000. Sherina sang and danced to Vijay's Arabic Kuthu song with her friends.

== Discography ==
Studio Album

- Andai Aku Besar Nanti (1999)
- Petualangan Sherina (2000)
- My Life (2002)
- Primadona (2007)
- Gemini (2009)
- Tuna (2013)

Mini Album

- I Have a Dream (2001)

Best Sherina Compilation Album

- Sherina & Sherina – Karaoke Version (2001)
- Sherina – Karaoke Version – ASEAN distribute (2002)
- The Best of Sherina (2003)
- My 3 Little Album (2013)
- Symphony of Love (2013)

Compilation Album

- Indonesia Female Singers Compilation – Swara Cantik (2001)
- 100 Tahun Bung Karno: Penyambung Lidah Rakyat -Simfoni Raya Indonesia (2001)
- Indonesian Campaign Single – My Indonesia (2002)
- BMG Nu. 1 (BMG artist compilation: Britney Spears, Nelly Furtado, Alicia Keys, Coco Lee, Westlife, Hans Zimmer, Nelly Furtado and Sherina) – Pelangiku & Lihatlah Lebih Dekat (2002)
- Indonesia Menangis Tsunami Aceh 2004 – Indonesia Menangis (2005)
- OST. Ayat-ayat Cinta – Jalan Cinta (2007)
- OST. Laskar Pelangi – Ku Bahagia (2008)
- Indonesia Unite – Rindu Bersatu with ST12, Nidji, d'Masiv, Alexa, Vierra, Gita Gutawa, The Changcuters, Kotak, Kangen Band, Rio Febrian, Geisha, Azhura, and Ungu (2010)
- Beta Cinta Indonesia – Simfoni Raya Indonesia (2011)

Other Single

- Selamat Datang Cinta with Elfa Secioria (2009)
- Krisis Air with Slank, Nugie, Nadine Chandrawinata (2010)
- Satu Hati – Satu Hati Campaign (2010)
- Sing Your Mind – One Young World in Zurich, Switzerland performance (2011)
- Ayo! Indonesia Bisa with Ello – Official 26th Sea Games in Indonesia (2011)

== Music video ==
Year	Title	Album
1999	"Pelangiku"	Andai Aku Besar Nanti
1999	"Andai Aku Besar Nanti"	Andai Aku Besar Nanti
1999	"Kembali ke Sekolah"	Andai Aku Besar Nanti
1999	"Balon Udaraku"	Andai Aku Besar Nanti
2000	"Lihatlah Lebih Dekat"	OST. Petualangan Sherina
2000	"Jagoan"	OST. Petualangan Sherina
2001	"I Have a Dream" feat. Westlife	UNICEF Fundraising
2002	"Simfoni Raya Indonesia"	100 Tahun Bung Karno: Penyambung Lidah Rakyat
2002	"My Life"	My Life
2002	"Click-Clock"	My Life
2005	"Indonesia Menangis"	Indonesia Menangis (Tsunami Aceh 2004)
2007	"Sendiri"	Primadona
2007	"Ku di Sini"	Primadona
2007	"Jalan Cinta"	OST. Ayat-ayat Cinta
2008	"Ku Bahagia"	OST. Laskar Pelangi
2009	"Cinta Pertama dan Terakhir"	Gemini
2010	"Geregetan"	Gemini
2010	"Pergilah Kau"	Gemini
2011	"Ayo! Indonesia Bisa" feat. Ello	Official Song 26th Sea Games in Indonesia
2013	"Akan Ku Tunggu"	Tuna
2013	"Sebelum Selamanya"	Tuna
2013	"Apakah Ku Jatuh Cinta" feat. Vidi Aldiano	Dunia Baru
2023	''Mengenang Bintang'' With Derby Romero	OST. Petualangan Sherina 2

== Back-up vocal ==
- Emily – "Salah Tingkah" (2012)

== Filmography ==
Year	Title	Role	Director	Notes
2000	Petualangan Sherina	Sherina	Riri Riza	Main role
2018	212 Warrior	Anggini	Angga Dwimas Sasongko	
2020	Earwig and the Witch	Earwig's Mother (voice)	Gorō Miyazaki	Japanese dub
2023	Petualangan Sherina 2	Sherina	Riri Riza	Main role

== Judge performance ==
Sherina signed to be a judge on The Voice, which debuted on Indosiar in February 2013. Sherina serves as a coach, alongside fellow musicians Armand Maulana, Giring Ganesha and Glenn Fredly, with Darius Sinathriya and Fenita Arie as the show's host.

== Host ==
- Kuis Sherina – Sherina Quiz (RCTI, 1999)
- Main Bersama Sherina – Playing with Sherina (RCTI, 1999)
- Jiffest (RCTI, 2001)
- Narator Surat Sahabat – Friends Letter (Narrator) (SCTV, 2006)

== Icon and brand ambassador ==
- Tini Wini Biti (1999–2002)
- Pediasure (2000–2001)
- Curcuma Plus (2000–2002)
- Susu Bendera (2000–2001)
- WWF (Worldwide Fund) (2001)
- Indonesia Tourism Campaigns (2002)
- My Noodle (2003)
- UNICEF (2004)
- Panasonic Gobel Indonesia (2007)
- Grand Indonesia (2009)
- Duta Lingkungan Hidup – Indonesian Natural Environment Icon (2009)
- Maybelline New York (2010)
- Simpati Freedom – Telkomsel (2010)
- MTV Staying Alive (2010)
- Clear (shampoo) (2011)
- Satu Hati Cerdaskan Bangsa (SHCB) Pocari Sweat (2011)
- One Young World (2011)
- Natur-E (2012)
- Kaspersky Anti-Virus (2012)
- Uniqlo (2013)
- KakaoTalk (2013)

== Awards and nominations ==
Awards	Year	Category	Nomination	Result
Anugerah Musik Indonesia	1999	Best of the Best Newcomer	"Andai Aku Besar Nanti"	Won
Anugerah Musik Indonesia	1999	Best Male/Female Child Solo Artist	"Andai Aku Besar Nanti"	Won
Anugerah Musik Indonesia	1999	Best Children Album	Andai Aku Besar Nanti	Won
Anugerah Musik Indonesia	2000	Best Male/Female Child Solo Artist	"Lihatlah Lebih Dekat"	Won
Anugerah Musik Indonesia	2000	Best Children Album	OST Petualangan Sherina	Won
Anugerah Musik Indonesia	2010	Best Pop Female Solo Artist	"Cinta Pertama dan Terakhir"	Nominated
Anugerah Musik Indonesia	2014	Best Urban Male/Female Solo Artist	"Akan Ku Tunggu"	Nominated
Anugerah Musik Indonesia	2014	Best Pop/Urban Collaboration	"Apakah Ku Jatuh Cinta" (featuring Vidi Aldiano)	Nominated
Anugerah Musik Indonesia	2014	Best Collaboration Production Work	"Apakah Ku Jatuh Cinta" (featuring Vidi Aldiano)	Nominated
Anugerah Musik Indonesia	2024	Best Film Scoring Album	Original Score from Petualangan Sherina 2	Won
Anugerah Musik Indonesia	2024	Best Orchestral Work	"Hadiah Istimewa" - Isyana Sarasvati, Chandra Satria (with Alvin Witarsa, Belanegara Abe)	Won
Anugerah Musik Indonesia	2024	Best Recording Producer	"Hadiah Istimewa" - Isyana Sarasvati, Chandra Satria (with Alvin Witarsa, Belanegara Abe)	Nominated
Anugerah Musik Indonesia	2024	Best Musical Album	Petualangan Sherina 2 (Original Motion Picture Soundtrack) (featuring Derby Romero)	Nominated
Anugerah Musik Indonesia	2024	Best Original Soundtrack Film Production Work	"Mengenang Bintang" - Sherina Munaf, Derby Romero (From "Petualangan Sherina 2")	Nominated
Indonesian Film Festival	2024	Audience's Choice Actress	Petualangan Sherina 2	Nominated
Indonesian Film Festival	2024	Best Original Score	Petualangan Sherina 2	Nominated
Indonesian Film Festival	2024	Best Original Song	"Mengenang Bintang" - Sherina Munaf, Derby Romero (From "Petualangan Sherina 2") (with Mira Lesmana dan Virania Munaf)	Nominated
Bandung Film Festival	2024	Outstanding Music Director	Petualangan Sherina 2	Won
Indonesian Journalists Film Festival	2023	Best Lead Actress - Drama Movie Genre	Petualangan Sherina 2	Nominated
Asia-Pacific Film Festival	2000	Most Talented Child Actress	Petualangan Sherina	Won
MTV Indonesia Awards	2009	Best Video of the Year	"Cinta Pertama dan Terakhir"	Won
Indigo Awards	2010	Best Social Media Artist	—	Won
Indigo Awards	2011	Best Social Media Artist	—	Nominated
Dahsyatnya Awards	2011	Outstanding Solo Singer	Sherina Munaf	Nominated
Dahsyatnya Awards	2011	Outstanding Song	"Geregetan"	Nominated
Dahsyatnya Awards	2011	Outstanding Role in Video Clip	"Geregetan"	Nominated
Nickelodeon Indonesia Kids' Choice Awards	2011	Favorite Female Singer	Sherina Munaf	Nominated
SCTV Awards	2024	Most Popular Television Drama Soundtracks	"Cinta Pertama dan Terakhir" (Ost. My Heart)	Nominated
