= Goeslaw =

Goeslaw is a surname. Notable people with this surname include:

- Melky Goeslaw (1947–2006), Indonesian singer
- Melly Goeslaw (born 1974), Indonesian singer
