= Jonathan Mulia =

Indonesian actor (born 1986)

- Born: July 8, 1986 (age 39); Jakarta, Indonesia
- Occupation: Actor
- Years active: 2005–present
- Parent(s): Ir. A. Sapardan and Joyce Smith

Jonathan Mulia (born July 8, 1986, in Jakarta, Indonesia) is an Indonesian actor. He began with the widely recognized role, as young Soe Hok Gie in film Gie. He is the younger brother of Onky Alexander.

== Personal life ==
Jonathan has also been rumored as being gay and had a relationship with singer Afgansyah Reza.

== Filmography ==
=== Film ===
- Gie (2005)
- Mirror (2005)
- Karma (2008)
