= Teddy Soeriaatmadja =

Indonesian film director (born 1975)

- Born: 7 February 1975 (age 51); Japan
- Education: Newport University (now the University of South Wales)
- Occupation: Director
- Years active: 2000–present
- Notable work: Banyu Biru; Ruma Maida

Teddy Soeriaatmadja (born 7 February 1975) is an Indonesian film director. Born in Japan and educated in Britain, Soeriaatmadja made his film debut in 2000 with the short film Culik (Kidnap); it was followed five years later by Banyu Biru (Blue Banyu), his feature film debut. Since then Soeriaatmadja has directed several films, including two which have garnered him a nomination for Best Director at the Indonesian Film Festival.

== Early life ==
Soeriaatmadja was born in Japan on 7 February 1975 to Ismail Rhousdy Soeriaatmadja (father) and Siti Syarifah. As a child he enjoyed watching movies at home, such as the Star Wars and James Bond franchises; in an interview with the Jakarta-based periodical Tabloid Nova, he recalled watching three to four films a day. By 1991 he had written his first screenplay, entitled Desember (December), and after viewing Quentin Tarantino's film Reservoir Dogs in 1992, decided that he wanted to work in film. He wrote several further screenplays while studying at Newport University in South Wales (now the University of South Wales), two of which he later adapted for film.

In 1996, after finishing his master's degree in Britain, Soeriaatmadja returned to Indonesia, where he worked for a year at a soft drink company. With his savings, he began work on his first short film, entitled Culik (Kidnap), which followed an Indonesian employee who kidnapped his Australian boss after being fired; he received additional funding from the Gothenburg Film Festival in Sweden. The film debuted at the 2000 Jakarta International Film Festival. It was through the making of Culik that Soeriaatmadja met directors Mira Lesmana and Riri Riza, who facilitated his entry into the industry. To gain more experience, he began work on music videos and TV advertisements.

== Feature film career ==
Soeriatmadja released his feature film debut, Banyu Biru (Blue Banyu), in 2005. The film, which followed a sales clerk on a road trip of self-discovery, had a budget of Rp. 5 billion. For Banyu Biru, Soeriaatmadja deliberately obscured the setting. A year end review of Indonesian films in The Jakarta Post described the film as "possibly the bravest and most original release of [March], if not the year." The following year he released Ruang (Room), a love story starring Winky Wiryawan, Luna Maya, and Slamet Rahardjo, which was moderately successful and garnered nine nominations at the 2006 Indonesian Film Festival, including Best Director.

Soeriaatmadja released Badai Pasti Berlalu, a remake of Teguh Karya's 1977 film of the same name, in 2007. The film, which starred Vino G. Bastian, Winky Wiryawan, and Raihaanun, followed a woman's struggle after being abandoned by her fiancé. For the film, Soeriaatmadja attempted to change several aspects of the original film and source work to better suit it for the 2000s, such as the main character's diabetes, but was refused by the original author, Marga T. Shortly after the film's release he married its star, Raihaanun. As of May 2012 the couple have a son, Millan Haruna Soeriaatmadja, with another due in June.

In 2009 Soeriaatmadja directed Ruma Maida (Maida's House), with a screenplay by Ayu Utami. The film, which detailed a woman's struggle to save a historic house from a developer while showing the life of the house's original owner, garnered a Best Director nomination for Soeriaatmadja at the 2009 Indonesian Film Festival. Two years later he released Lovely Man, which followed a woman's search for her father and their interactions after she discovered he was a transsexual. He was quoted in the Jakarta Globe as saying that he did not want to portray transsexuals as comedic fodder, an approach common in Indonesian films.

== Filmography ==
- Culik (Kidnap; short film; 2001)
- Banyu Biru (Blue Banyu; 2005)
- Ruang (Room; 2006)
- Badai Pasti Berlalu (The Storm Shall Surely Pass; 2007)
- Namaku Dick (My Name is Dick; 2008)
- Ruma Maida (Maida's House; 2009)
- Lovely Man (2011)
- Something in the Way (2013)
- About a Woman (2015)
- Ten Seconds before Sunrise (2018)
- Affliction (2021)
- Innocent Vengeance (2023)
- The Talent Agency (streaming television series; 2023)
- The Architecture of Love (2024)
- All We Need Is Time (2024)
- Dopamine (2025)

== Awards and nominations ==
Year	Award	Category	Nominated work	Result
2006	Indonesian Film Festival	Best Film	Ruang	Nominated
2006	Indonesian Film Festival	Best Director	Ruang	Nominated
2006	Indonesian Film Festival	Best Original Story	Ruang	Nominated
2009	Indonesian Film Festival	Best Film	Ruma Maida	Nominated
2009	Indonesian Film Festival	Best Director	Ruma Maida	Nominated
2012	Maya Award	Best Feature Film	Lovely Man	Won
2012	Maya Award	Best Director	Lovely Man	Won
2012	Maya Award	Best Screenplay	Lovely Man	Won
2012	Indonesian Film Festival	Best Film	Lovely Man	Nominated
2012	Indonesian Film Festival	Best Director	Lovely Man	Nominated
2012	Indonesian Film Festival	Best Screenplay	Lovely Man	Nominated
2012	Indonesian Film Festival	Best Original Story	Lovely Man	Nominated
2012	Asian Film Awards	Best Director	Lovely Man	Nominated
2012	Tiburon International Film Festival	Best Film	Lovely Man	Won
2012	Tiburon International Film Festival	Best Director	Lovely Man	Won
2012	Tel Aviv LGBT International Film Festival	Best International Narrative Feature	Lovely Man	Won
2012	Osaka Asian Film Festival	Grand Prix	Lovely Man	Nominated
2013	Piala Maya	Best Feature Film	Something in the Way	Nominated
2013	Piala Maya	Best Original Screenplay	Something in the Way	Nominated
