= Banyu Biru =

- VCD cover
- Directed by: Teddy Soeriaatmadja
- Written by: Rayya Makarim; Prima Rusdi
- Produced by: Salto Films
- Starring: Tora Sudiro; Dian Sastrowardoyo
- Release date: March 10, 2005
- Running time: 78 minutes
- Country: Indonesia
- Language: Indonesian

Banyu Biru is a 2005 Indonesian film starring Tora Sudiro. It features music by Slank.
