= Ismail Rhousdy Soeriaatmadja =

Indonesian diplomat (1939–2011)

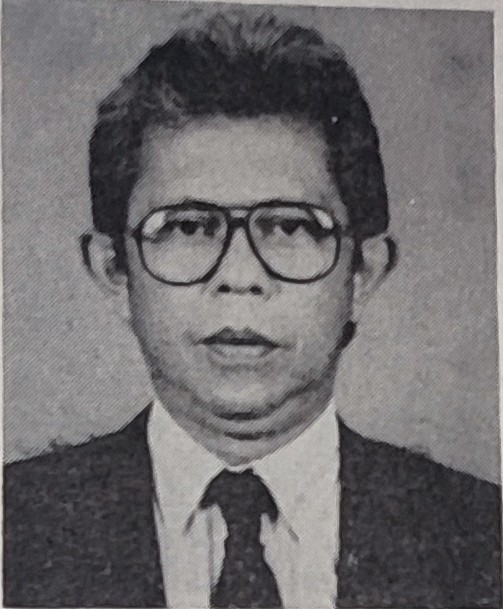

Ambassador of Indonesia to Austria
- In office 1998–2002
- Preceded by: Sumaryo Suryokusumo
- Succeeded by: T. A. Samodra Sriwijaya

Assistant for Foreign Policy to the Coordinating Minister for Political and Security Affairs
- In office 1995–1998
- Preceded by: Hassan Abduldjalil
- Succeeded by: Amin Rianom

Ambassador of Indonesia to Brazil
- In office 1992–1995
- Preceded by: Alex Rumamby
- Succeeded by: Adian Silalahi

Personal details
- Born: July 23, 1939 Tanjung Pinang, Riau, Dutch East Indies
- Died: May 13, 2011 (aged 71)
- Children: 6
- Education: University of Indonesia (S.H.)

Ismail Rhousdy Soeriaatmadja (23 July 1939 – 13 May 2011) was an Indonesian career diplomat who served as the country's ambassador to Brazil from 1992 to 1995 and to Austria from 1998 to 2002. Between his two ambassadorial tenure, he was the foreign policy aide to the coordinating ministers for politics and security Soesilo Soedarman and Feisal Tanjung.

== Early life and education ==
Born in Tanjung Pinang, Riau, on 23 July 1939, Ismail received his law degree from the University of Indonesia, and later during his diplomatic career completed basic diplomatic (Caraka) course and senior diplomatic course.

== Diplomatic career ==
Ismail started his career in the diplomatic service in 1963, and by 1967 (Note: 1969 according to the English version of his biography.) received his first posting overseas at the embassy in Moscow with the rank of attaché before being promoted to secretary a few years later. He returned to Indonesia by 1971 and had a brief stint at the protocol directorate before being transferred to the directorate of technical cooperation a year later.

In 1974, Ismail was posted to the embassy in Tokyo with the rank of second secretary, being promoted to first secretary at the same place. In 1978, Soeriaatmadja returned to the home office to serve in the directorate of investment and financial cooperation. He returned to overseas diplomatic duties in 1980 when he was appointed to the embassy in Vienna with the rank of counsellor. He was then transferred to serve at the permanent mission to the UN in New York with the same rank.

Upon a round of service overseas, in 1985 he returned to the foreign department's office, serving in the directorate of multilateral economic cooperation. Within three years, in 1988 Ismail became the director of technical cooperation and economic services. His brief directorship ended in 1989 with his appointment as deputy chief of mission at the embassy in London. On 15 January 1992, Soeriaatmadja was inducted into office as ambassador to Brazil, concurrently accredited to Peru and Bolivia, with residence in Brasilia. Shortly upon assuming office, on 12 May of the same year Ismail paid a visit to Brazil's Supreme Federal Court, where he was welcomed by the court's president Sydney Sanches. His ambassadorial term in Brazil ended in mid-1995 and he was replaced by chargés d'affaires ad interim Djoko Santoso.

Ismail returned home for an appointment as assistant for foreign policy to the coordinating minister for politics and security. At the end of his service to the coordinating minister, on 6 August 1998 he received the Star of Service, 1st class. On 20 October 1998, president B. J. Habibie installed him as ambassador to Austria, Slovenia, and other UN bodies, with residence in Vienna. He presented his credentials to President of Austria Thomas Klestil on 16 December 1998. His second ambassadorial term ended on 2002. Ismail died on 13 May 2011 and his body interred at the Menteng Pulo public cemetery.

== Personal life ==
Ismail adhered to the Muslim faith. He was married to Melinda Susilarini and has six children. Among his children was Indonesian film director Teddy Soeriaatmadja, who was born during Ismail's posting in Tokyo.
