= Petualangan Sherina =

- Theatrical poster
- Directed by: Riri Riza
- Written by: Jujur Prananto
- Produced by: Mira Lesmana
- Starring: Sherina Munaf; Didi Petet; Mathias Muchus; Ratna Riantiarno; Butet Kertaradjasa; Henidar Amru; Djaduk Ferianto; Dewi Hughes; Ucy Nurul; Derby Romero
- Cinematography: Yadi Sugandhy
- Edited by: Sentot Sahid
- Music by: Elfa Secioria
- Production company: Miles Productions
- Release date: 14 June 2000
- Running time: 114 minutes
- Country: Indonesia
- Language: Indonesian
- Budget: Rp 2 billion
- Box office: Rp 10 billion

Petualangan Sherina (lit. 'Sherina's Adventure') is a 2000 Indonesian family musical film directed by Riri Riza. The film stars Sherina Munaf, Derby Romero, Didi Petet, Mathias Muchus, Ratna Riantiarno, and Butet Kertaradjasa. The screenplay was written by Jujur Prananto, with music arranged by Elfa Secioria.

== Plot ==
Sherina Darmawan is an energetic and intelligent girl living in Jakarta with her parents, until they have to leave when her father gets a job as an agronomist at a plantation in Lembang owned by Ardiwilaga. She quickly adapts and acquires some new friends, only to find herself as the target of the bully boys, including a boy named Sadam. Sherina cannot accept such treatment and gathers her classmates in a struggle against Sadam. When she accompanies his father to visit the plantation, she discovers that Sadam is Ardiwilaga's son.

Sherina and Sadam challenge each other to climb the nearby hills and, upon arriving, Sadam attempts to leave Sherina behind. She tries to find her way back to the plantation and stumbles across an adult man. After convincing her that he has found Sadam, they go to a car where another man is waiting. As they gesture for Sherina to get into their car, Sherina hears Sadam's muffled voice from its boot, telling her to get away. She discovers that they have been tasked with kidnapping Sadam by a cunning businessman named Kertarajasa, who plans to buy the plantation to complete their development project.

When the kidnappers try to call Ardiwilaga, they reach his wife and tell her to prepare a 3 billion rupiah ransom. She agrees to this condition and convinces her husband to sell the land to Natasya, who had offered them 2 billion the day before. Later, at the kidnappers' hideout, Sherina rescues Sadam while the guards are sleeping. They take documentation connecting the thugs to Kertarajasa and escape to spend a night at a nearby observatory. In Jakarta, Kertarajasa dances with his wife, revealed to be Natasya, stating that he will launch his project the following day once the plantation is legally his.

As Sadam is desperately ill in the morning, Sherina tries to leave the observatory through the front door, only to discover that it had been locked. With Sadam's help, she rappels down the observatory wall and outruns two of the kidnappers, making her way to a nearby village and catching a ride to Ardiwilaga's home. Once Sadam is captured, Sherina arrives just as he is preparing to sign the land deed over to Natasya and reveals Kertarajasa's plans. Police quickly arrest Natasya and Kertarajasa, and when the kidnappers try to collect their ransom, they are arrested too. When Sherina and Sadam return to school after holidays, the latter agrees to stop bullying his classmates.

== Cast ==
- Sherina Munaf as Sherina
- Derby Romero as Sadam (singing voice provided by Rodo Purba)
- Mathias Muchus as Mr. Darmawan, Sherina's father
- Ucy Nurul as Sherina's Mother
- Didi Petet as Mr. Ardiwilaga, Sadam's father
- Ratna Riantiarno as Sadam's Mother
- Butet Kertaradjasa as Mr. Raden
- Henidar Amroe as Natasya
- Djaduk Ferianto as Kertarajasa
- Dewi Hughes as Sherina's teacher
- Alyssa Soebandono as Sherina's friend

== Production ==
Sherina was directed by Riri Riza and Mira Lesmana and was produced by Miles Production. The film was planned to cost Rp 1.3 billion (US$180,000), but went over budget and eventually cost Rp 2 billion (US$250,000). The filming was conducted from November to December 1999. In this film, Elfa Secioria composed the film's soundtrack Lihatlah Lebih Dekat (Take a Closer Look), which is also Sherina's second album, while Lesmana wrote the lyrics for eight songs. Lesmana said that ideas and inspirations came from The Sound of Music and Grease.

== Release and reception ==
Petualangan Sherina premiered on 7 June 2000, and received wide release on 14 June 2000. Yan Wijaya, writing in The Jakarta Post, said that the film was like a breath of fresh air wafting through the stale Indonesian movie world. Leila S. Chudori, in a review for Tempo, wrote that the music for the film was interesting and easy to listen to, with brilliant visualization, but the editing is rather chaotic, and the children's choreography is weak.

According to a review by The Jakarta Post the storyline is easily understood by all, including children from all levels of society. The review states that the film boasts fine graphic quality, smooth camerawork, neatly constructed scenes and attractive cinematography, especially shots of mountains, forests and landscapes. This was reminiscent of several Indonesian films from the 1950s to 1970s, including Si Pintjang (The Lame; 1951), Jenderal Kancil (General Mousedeer; 1958), Bintang Kecil (Little Star, 1963), and Rio Anakku (Rio, My Son; 1973).

The film was watched by over 1.1 million people, and earned Rp 10 billion (US$1.2 million). RCTI acquired the film's broadcasting rights, premiering it on 15 March 2001.

== Petualangan Sherina 2 ==
A sequel, Petualangan Sherina 2, was announced in 2020, with Munaf and Romero reprising their roles as adults. It was initially scheduled to premiere in 2021, but delayed to 28 September 2023 due to the COVID-19 pandemic in Indonesia.

Sherina, now a journalist on NEX TV, reunites with Sadam, who has been separated from her for a long time. They are tasked to reunite an infant orangutan to its parents while reminiscing their childhood memories.

== Adaptations ==
=== Animation ===
An animated adaptation was announced in 2020.

=== Musical ===
In 2017, the Jakarta Movement of Inspiration staged a musical adaptation of the film. It was again performed in 2022.

== Awards ==
Petualangan Sherina received a special jury prize at the 2000 Asia Pacific Film Festival. The following year it won Best Children's Film at the Bandung Film Festival. At the 2004 Indonesian Film Festival, the first in over a decade, the film received three nominations for a Citra Award but saw no wins.

Award	Year	Category	Recipient	Result
Asia Pacific Film Festival	2000	Special Jury Prize	–	Won
Bandung Film Festival	2001	Best Children's Film	–	Won
Indonesian Film Festival	2004	Best Leading Actor	Derby Romero	Nominated
Indonesian Film Festival	2004	Best Supporting Actor	Djaduk Ferianto	Nominated
Indonesian Film Festival	2004	Best Musical Direction	Elfa Secioria	Nominated
