= Arief Budiman =

Indonesian activist (1940–2020)

- Born: Soe Hok Djin; 3 January 1940; Batavia, Dutch East Indies
- Died: 23 April 2020 (aged 80); Salatiga, East Java, Indonesia
- Education: University of Indonesia (S.Psi.); Harvard University (Ph.D.)
- Spouse: Leila Chairani Budiman

Chinese name
- Traditional Chinese: 史福仁
- Simplified Chinese: 史福仁
- Hanyu Pinyin: Shǐ Fú Rén
- Hokkien POJ: Sú Hok Jîn

Arief Budiman, born Soe Hok Djin (Chinese: 史福仁; Pe̍h-ōe-jī: Sú Hok Jîn; 3 January 1940 – 23 April 2020) was a Chinese Indonesian sociologist, cultural critic, and social activist.

== Biography ==
Budiman was born Soe Hok Djin on 3 January, 1940. His father, Soe Lie Piet, was a writer and magazine editor, and his younger brother Soe Hok Gie was a social activist. He graduated from Kolese Kanisius, a Jesuit high school, and then Universitas Indonesia where he earned a bachelor's degree in psychology in 1968. In 1980, he earned his Ph.D. in sociology from Harvard University, United States. He was a lecturer at the Universitas Kristen Satya Wacana, Salatiga, Indonesia until 1996. From 1997 for about 10 years, he was a professor of Indonesian studies in University of Melbourne, Australia.

He was a vocal critic of Indonesian politics. For example, he is quoted in Adam Schwarz's book A Nation in Waiting (1994 edition) as having elucidated the following analysis of third-world democracy in 1992, while Suharto was still in power:

"The first is what I would call loan democracy. This democracy exists when the state is very strong so it can afford to be criticised. A sort of democratic space then emerges in which people can express their opinions freely. However, when the state thinks the criticism has gone too far, it will simply take back the democracy that it has only lent. The people have no power to resist. There is, second, limited democracy. This democracy exists only when there is a conflict among the state elites ... People can criticise one faction of the 'powers that be' and be protected by the opposite faction ... However, when the conflict within the elite is over, this democratic space will probably disappear also."

On 23 April 2020, Budiman died of Parkinson's disease.

== Works ==
- Co-author with Richard Dobbs, Raoul Oberman, Fraser Thompson and Morten Rosse (2012) The archipelago economy: Unleashing Indonesia's potential. KcKinset Global Institute.
- As an editor with Damien Kingsbury and Barbara Hatley (1999) Reformasi: Crisis and Change in Indonesia. Centre for Southeast Asian Studies, Monash University.
- As editor with Damien Kingsbury (2001) Indonesia: the uncertain transition Hindmarsh, S. Aust. Crawford House. ISBN 1-86333-208-1

== Bibliography ==
- Anggraeni, Dewi (6 February 2008). "Arief Budiman: Defying the Chinese stereotype". The Jakarta Post.
- Suryadinata, Leo (1995), Prominent Indonesian Chinese: Biographical Sketches (3rd ed.), Singapore: Institute of Southeast Asian Studies, ISBN 978-981-3055-04-9.
