= Raihaanun =

Indonesian actress and model (born 1988)

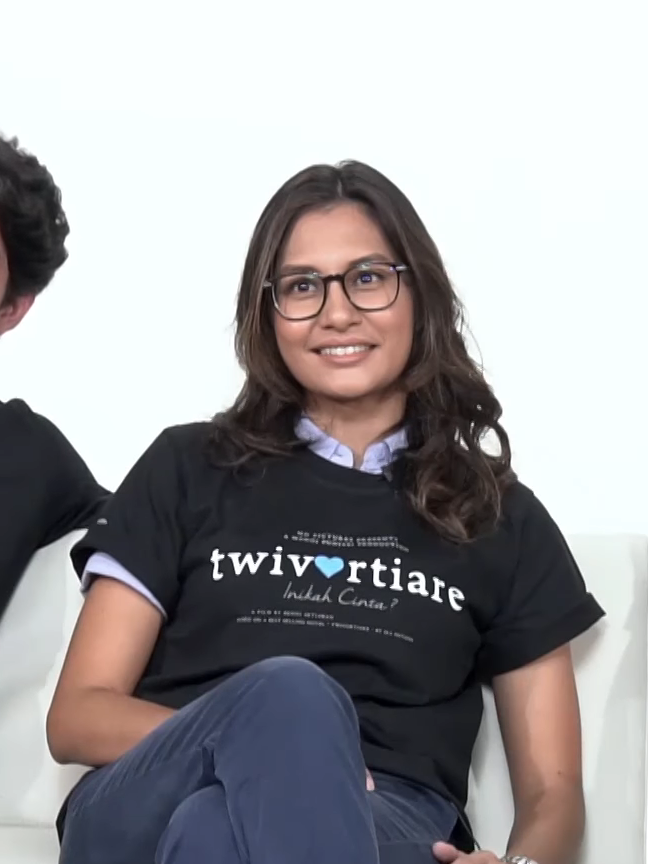
- Raihaanun in 2019
- Born: Siti Hafar Raihaanun Nabila; June 7, 1988 (age 37); Jakarta, Indonesia
- Occupations: Celebrity, Model
- Years active: 2003 - present
- Height: 164 cm (5 ft 5 in)
- Spouse: Teddy Soeriaatmadja (m. 2007; div. 2023)
- Children: Millan Rushan Karuna Soeriaatmadja; Kafka Roushan Karuna Soeriaatmadja; Rumi Rhoushan Karuna Soeriaatmadja
- Parent(s): Hazier Moein (father); Yulia Farahdibha (mother)
- Relatives: Itang Yunasz (uncle)
- Awards: Citra Award for Best Leading Actress 2019 27 Steps of May Citra Award for Best Supporting Actress 2016 Salawaku

Siti Hafar Raihaanun Nabila HM or better known as Raihaanun (born June 7, 1988) is an Indonesian actress, and model of mixed Bugis and Minangkabau descent.

== Biography ==
Raihaanun who is familiarly called 'Haanun', began her career as a GADIS Sampul finalist 2003. After that, Haanun starred in several commercials and soap operas. Some soap operas starred by the youngest child of 6 of Hazier Moein-Yulia Farahdibha, among others, include Sepatu Kaca, Kawin Gantung, Julia Jadi Anak Gedongan, and My Prince n My Monster. She appeared in the remake of Badai Pasti Berlalu (2007).

Raihaanun married to Teddy Soeriaatmadja, director of the film Badai Pasti Berlalu (2007 film) on March 17, 2007. The age range of13 years does not seem to be an obstacle for them.

On January 16, 2008 Haanun gave birth to a son, Millan Rushan Karuna Soeriaatmadja.

== Soap operas ==
- Sepatu Kaca
- Kawin Gantung
- Julia Jadi Anak Gedongan
- Kehormatan 2
- Senandung Masa Puber
- Tangisan Anak Tiri
- My Prince n My Monster
- Cinta Nggak Sempurna (FTV)
- Cinta Milik Kita (FTV)
- Bibik Saingan Gue (FTV)
- Katakan Cinta Untuk Putri (FTV)

== Filmography ==
=== Film ===
| Year | Title | Role | Notes |
|---|---|---|---|
| 2007 | Badai Pasti Berlalu | Siska | |
| 2009 | Heart-Break.com | Nayla | |
| 2011 | Lovely Man | Cahaya | |
| 2016 | Salawaku | Binaiya | Won - 2016 Indonesian Film Festival for Best Actress for supporting role |
| 2018 | 27 Steps of May | May | Won - 2019 Indonesian Film Festival for Best Actress for leading role |
| 2019 | Twivortiare | Alexandra Rhea | |
| 2020 | Everyday is a Lullaby | Shakuntala | |
| 2021 | Affliction | Nina | |
| 2022 | Deadly Love Poetry | Anna | |
| 2023 | Layangan Putus The Movie | Kinan | |
| 2024 | Beautiful Pain | Niken | TBA |
| 2024 | Ratu Sihir | Mirah | TBA |
| 2025 | Gowok: Javanese Kamasutra | Nya' Ratri | |

=== Music video ===
| Year | Title | Artist | Ref. |
|---|---|---|---|
| 2010 | Percaya Padaku | Ungu | |

== Awards and nominations ==
| Year | Award | Category | Work | Result |
|---|---|---|---|---|
| 2007 | Indonesian Movie Awards | Best Newcomer Actress | Badai Pasti Berlalu | Nominated |
| 2007 | Indonesian Movie Awards | Favorite Newcomer Actress | Badai Pasti Berlalu | Nominated |
| 2012 | Maya Award | Best Actress in a Leading Role | Lovely Man | Nominated |
| 2016 | Indonesian Film Festival | Citra Award for Best Supporting Actress | Salawaku | Won |
| 2017 | Indonesian Movie Actor Awards | Best Actress | Salawaku | Nominated |
| 2017 | Indonesian Movie Actor Awards | Favorite Actress | Salawaku | Won |
| 2019 | Indonesian Film Festival | Citra Award for Best Leading Actress | 27 Steps of May | Won |
| 2019 | Maya Award | Best Actress in a Leading Role | 27 Steps of May | Won |
| 2019 | Maya Award | Best Actress in a Leading Role | Twivortiare | Nominated |
