= Gie =

2005 film

- Theatrical poster for Gie
- Directed by: Riri Riza
- Written by: Riri Riza
- Produced by: Mira Lesmana
- Starring: Nicholas Saputra; Wulan Guritno; Robby Tumewu
- Distributed by: Sinemart Pictures
- Release date: 14 July 2005
- Running time: 147 minutes
- Country: Indonesia
- Language: Indonesian
- Budget: ~ Rp10 billion

Gie is a 2005 Indonesian biopic film directed by Riri Riza. The film tells the story of Soe Hok Gie, a graduate from University of Indonesia who is known as an activist and nature lover. The film is based on the diary Catatan Seorang Demonstran written by Soe himself. The plot of this film is an interpretation of the filmmakers, and scenes portraying Soe's private life may be partly fictionalised for dramatisation.

The film received 11 nominations at the 2005 Indonesian Film Festival, winning three for "Best Film", "Best Actor" (in a leading role) for Nicholas Saputra, and "Best Cinematography".

== Plot ==
Soe Hok Gie grew up in a lower-middle class Chinese Indonesian family in Jakarta. In his early teens, young Gie had developed a fascination in concepts and idealisms advocated by world class intellectuals. Combined with a fighter's passion, faithfulness to friends, and a heart filled with genuine care for others and for his country, young Gie grew to become intolerant with injustice, and dreamt of an Indonesia that is truly founded on justice, equality, and righteousness. This passion was frequently misunderstood by others. Even Soe's best friends, Tan Tjin Han and Herman Lantang posed the question "What is all this fighting for?" which Soe would calmly respond with his awareness that freedom has a price tag that must be paid. Soe's motto, as written on the movie poster, is translated as "It is better to be singled out than to surrender to hypocrisy".

Soe's teen and college years was spent under the regime of Indonesia's founding father Sukarno, which was characterised with conflict between the military and the Indonesian Communist Party (PKI). Soe and his friends insisted that they were politically neutral; and as much as Soe has respect for Sukarno as Indonesia's founding father, Soe detested Sukarno's dictatorship which caused the poor and the oppressed to suffer. Soe was well aware of the social inequality, power abuse, and corruption under the government of Sukarno, and courageously spoke out against it in discussion groups, student unions, and wrote sharp criticisms in the media. Soe also abhorred the fact that too many students appeared to others as advocates of positive change, who in fact were just taking advantage of the political situation to make personal gain. This attracted much sympathy as well as opposition. Many interest groups sought Soe to support their campaigns, while many enemies of Soe jump at any opportunity to intimidate him.

Tan, Soe's childhood friend, had always deeply admired Soe's prudence and courage but lacked that fighter's spirit himself. In their twenties, the boys were reunited again for a short time. Soe finds out that Tan had become "seduced" and deeply involved with the PKI but was ignorant as to what this implied or what consequences awaited. Soe urges Tan to relinquish his ties with the PKI and hide out, but Tan did not listen.

Soe and his friends spend their leisure time hiking and enjoy nature with the Nature-Loving Students of the University of Indonesia (Mapala UI). Other things they enjoyed doing included watching and analysing movies, attending traditional Indonesian performing arts, and hanging out at parties.

== Cast ==
- Nicholas Saputra as Soe Hok Gie
- Jonathan Mulia as Young Soe Hok Gie
- Thomas Nawilis as Tan Tjin Han
- Christian Audi as Young Tan Tjin Han
- Sita Nursanti as Ira
- Wulan Guritno as Sinta
- Lukman Sardi as Herman Lantang
- Angelo Bondoc as Young Herman Lantang
- Indra Birowo
- Surya Saputra
- Doni Alamsyah
- Robby Tumewu
- Tutie Kirana
- Gino Korompus
- Rosaline Oscarr
- Soultan Saladin
- Naya Kartaadiredja (uncredited)

== Additional characters ==
Ira and Sinta are two girls that represented the women in Soe's life. While in real life Soe did date several girls in the UI, Ira and Sinta in this movie are fictional characters because the women that were in fact close to Soe refused to make themselves known and reveal details of their relationship with Soe. Soe's diary mentioned his involvement with three women; however, it did not clearly indicate whether he was in love with any one of them.

Ira was an intellectual young woman that shared Gie's idealistic dreams and fighter's spirit. Ira was Soe's best supporter and friend and present both during Gie's productive and leisure activities. Subtle hints of romance seemed to spark between the two every now and then, but neither had the nerve to follow it through.

As the years unwinded, along came Sinta, an attractive girl with rich parents who admired Soe's writings. It was obvious that Gie and Sinta were physically attracted to each other, but failed to find the heart-to-heart connection. Sinta seemed to merely delight in Gie's company and the comfort and pride of being the girlfriend of a well-respected character, but did not have a genuine interest for the things that are close to Gie's heart. Vice versa, Gie was clueless about keeping Sinta entertained, and felt dissatisfied with the relationship. Sinta's presence caused a chill between Gie and Ira.

The romance between Soe in the movie and Sinta may be based on Soe's closest girlfriend in real life. She was the daughter of a wealthy couple who admired Soe's work. However, as the relationship intensified, the girl's parents began to find excuses to prevent Soe and their daughter from seeing each other because the parents did not want to risk having their daughter married to a man who was struggling to make ends meet financially and was frequently the target of hate speech and other threats. In the movie, however, there was not much parental intervention portrayed or suggested in Soe and Sinta's relationship—it simply features several (often speechless) scenes of Soe and Sinta which leaves the audience to draw their own conclusions as to what may be going on at the back of Soe and Sinta's heads.

Tan Tjin Han, young Soe's best friend, is in fact a fictional character. He is inspired by two personal friends of Soe, Djin Hok and Effendi. Djin Hok was the friend of Soe who experienced domestic abuse in his aunt's house, while Effendi was the friend who was abducted for his alleged involvement in the PKI.

Other additional characters include Denny (a humorous and outspoken friend of Soe), Jaka (promoter of the Catholic student union who turned out to only have used politics as a means of obtaining personal gain) and Santi (a prostitute introduced to Soe as the boys' attempt to stimulate Soe to do something about his potentially romantic relationship with Ira).

== Awards and nominations ==
- Official entry from Indonesia for Best Foreign Language Film at the 78th Academy Awards
- In competition in the ASEAN category at the 2006 Bangkok International Film Festival
- Awarded Best Film at the 2005 Indonesian Film Festival

== Original Motion Picture Soundtrack ==
- Gie- Eross SO7 Feat. Okta
- Cahaya Bulan- Eross SO7 Feat. Okta
- Dimana Dia- Tetty Kadi
- Terombang Di Penantian- Titiek Puspa
- Genjer Genjer- Bing Slamet
- Nurlela- Bing Slamet
- Mr. Ego- Speaker 1st
- Donna Donna- Sita Nursanti RSD
