= Ada Apa Dengan Cinta? 2 =

2016 Indonesian film by Riri Riza

- Theatrical release poster
- Directed by: Riri Riza
- Screenplay by: Riri Riza; Prima Rusdi
- Produced by: Mira Lesmana
- Starring: Dian Sastrowardoyo; Nicholas Saputra; Titi Kamal; Sissy Priscillia; Adinia Wirasti; Dennis Adhiswara; Ario Bayu
- Cinematography: Yadi Sugandi
- Edited by: W Ichwandiardono
- Music by: Melly Goeslaw; Anto Hoed
- Production companies: Miles Films; Tanakhir Films
- Distributed by: Miles Films (Indonesia); Primeworks Distribution (Malaysia)
- Release date: 28 April 2016
- Running time: 124 minutes
- Country: Indonesia
- Language: Indonesian
- Budget: Rp.10 billion ($746,000)
- Box office: $12.50 million

Ada Apa Dengan Cinta? 2 (English: What's Up with Love? 2) is a 2016 Indonesian teen film directed by Riri Riza. It is the sequel to the 2002 cult classic romance Ada Apa Dengan Cinta? with Dian Sastrowardoyo and Nicholas Saputra reprising their roles as Cinta and Rangga.

== Plot ==
Cinta is now the owner of a mini pop art café in Jakarta. She and her high school gang comfort Karmen, who is recovering from drug addiction. Milly is married to the gang's formerly geeky high school mate, Mamet and is currently pregnant with their first child, while Maura is married to Chris with 4 kids. Cinta announces that the ladies will go on a vacation to Yogyakarta and that she is engaged to her boyfriend Trian.

Meanwhile, in New York City, Rangga is the co-owner of a coffee shop when his step-sister, Sukma, pays a visit to ask him to visit his estranged mother in Yogyakarta, but he refuses. He ultimately has a change of heart and decides to go there after his co-owner and friend, Roberto, convinces him to return to Indonesia and tie up his loose ends.

Before the ladies go, they visit the grave of Alya, who died in an accident in 2010. Rangga arrives in Jakarta to find that Cinta is no longer living in her old house, so he continues to Yogyakarta. In Yogyakarta, while vacationing, Karmen and Milly see Rangga on the road, and they tell Cinta about it. Cinta refuses to see him at first, but after an argument with Karmen, she decides to do so.

It is revealed that they broke up in 2006. Cinta expresses her resentment towards him for gratuitously ending their relationship, and that she only agreed to meet him because of her friends. Rangga explains that he broke up with her because of his academic and vocational struggles, and he thought that he couldn't make Cinta happy. However, they decide to end things on friendly terms. Cinta ends up spending the whole day with Rangga, forgetting her vacation schedule with her friends. Before parting ways, Cinta kisses Rangga, to the shock of both former lovers. Cinta then returns to Jakarta, and Rangga pays his mother a visit.

Cinta cannot get Rangga out of her head, and before returning to New York, Rangga stops by in Jakarta and goes to Cinta's café. He admits that he wants them to be more than friends again, but she replies that the kiss meant nothing, leaving him furious. Rangga storms out of the café as Trian arrives. Trian, noticing Cinta's changed behavior after her trip, and after seeing Rangga himself, confronts Cinta about Rangga, resulting in the end of the engagement. Rangga flies back to New York while a distressed Cinta has a near-death experience on the freeway, but walks away with no injuries.

A month later in New York, Rangga and Roberto give their employee Donna a raise, and in gratitude, she hugs him; just as Cinta unexpectedly enters the café. Misinterpreting the situation, Cinta runs away. Rangga gives chase, straightening the situation, and they express their love for each other and share a passionate kiss in a snowy Central Park, united at last. Before the credits, Rangga and Cinta hold what appears to be their baby, until Mamet comes and asks them to return his new baby.

== Cast ==
- Dian Sastrowardoyo as Cinta
- Nicholas Saputra as Rangga
- Titi Kamal as Maura
- Adinia Wirasti as Karmen
- Sissy Priscillia as Milly
- Dennis Adhiswara as Mamet
- Ario Bayu as Trian
- Dimi Cindyastra as Sukma
- Chase Kuertz as Roberto
- Lei-Lei Bavoil as Donna

== Soundtrack ==
Ada Apa Dengan Cinta? 2

Soundtrack album by Melly Goeslaw
- Released: 2016
- Genre: Pop
- Language: Indonesian
- Label: Aquarius Musikindo
- Producer: Anto Hoed

Melly Goeslaw chronology
Queen of Soundtrack (2013)	Ada Apa Dengan Cinta? 2 (2016)

Melly Goeslaw and Anto Hoed returned from the first film to write new songs for the sequel. The soundtrack was released on 31st March 2016, while the film was released on 28th April. It features six new songs again composed by Goeslaw and Hoed, along with the return of "Demikianlah", "Hanya", "Ingin Mencintai dan Dicintai", "Bimbang" and "Suara Hati Seorang Kekasih" from the original film. The soundtrack was preceded by the pre-release single "Bimbang", performed by Goodbye Felicia and Stephanie Poetri. The single "Ratusan Purnama" was nominated for the AMI Award for Best Pop Collaboration and the Best Works Produced for Visual Media, losing to "Percayalah" by Afgan and Raisa and "Aku Bisa Apa?" from Jilbab Traveler: Love Sparks in Korea, respectively. The single won the 2016 Citra Award for Best Theme Song.

=== Track listing ===
All tracks are written by Melly Goeslaw.

No.	Title	Performer(s)	Length
1.	"I'm Still Loving You"	Melly Goeslaw	2:42
2.	"Bimbang" ("Hestitate")	Goodbye Felicia and Stephanie Poetri	3:25
3.	"Perjalanan" ("Journey")	Goeslaw	3:20
4.	"Ratusan Purnama"	Goeslaw featuring Marthino Lio	4:03
5.	"Jangan Ajak Ajak Dia" ("Don't Invite Him/Her")	Goeslaw	3:49
6.	"Sayang Mau Apa?" ("What Are You Doing, Honey?")	Goeslaw	2:54
7.	"Terlalu Cinta" ("Overestimating Love")	Goeslaw	3:04
8.	"Suara Hati Seorang Kekasih" (2016 version)	Goeslaw	4:46

== Production ==
In 2014, Japanese messenger app Line released a promotional short film featuring the Ada Apa dengan Cinta? cast. The short tells the story of how Cinta and Rangga meet again after 12 years apart. After the release, the short became an immediate trending topic on Twitter and gained 2½ million viewers on YouTube in just 2 days. The short's successful release prompted many people to express their excitement for an actual full length sequel. This positive reception of the short proved that the 2002's cult classic teen romance remained popular in Indonesia. Finally, in March 2015, after months of speculations and rumours, Mira Lesmana the short's director and producer of Ada Apa Dengan Cinta? confirmed that a feature sequel was on the works. The sequel was confirmed to be released on 28 April 2016. While most of the cast were expected to return, it was announced in August 2015 that Ladya Cheryl, who portrays Cinta's best friend Alya in the first film, would not be returning for the sequel. Her character was originally written in the script, but, due to her absence, her character was written to be dead in the film.

== Reception ==
Overseas the film Ada Apa Dengan Cinta? 2 was screened simultaneously in the countries of Indonesia, Malaysia, and Brunei Darussalam, in addition AADC? 2 was also screened in 5 cities in Australia including Melbourne, Sydney, Adelaide, Darwin, and Brisbane starting August 23, 2016. Not only that, the film AADC? 2 was also screened as the opening film of the Fukuoka International Film Festival 2016 on September 15, 2016.

Domestically, the film Ada Apa Dengan Cinta? 2 broke the record with 200,000 ticket sales in theaters on its first day of screening, making it the most-watched Indonesian film on its opening day. On its fourth day, AADC? 2 was watched by more than 1 million people, becoming the fastest Indonesian film to reach this milestone.

== See also ==
- What's Up with Love? (2002 film)
- Ada Apa Dengan Cinta? the Series
