= Salawaku (film) =

2016 drama film

- Promotional poster
- Directed by: Pritagita Arianegara
- Written by: Iqbal Fadly; Titien Wattimena
- Produced by: Ray Zulham; Michael Julius
- Starring: Elko Kastanya; Karina Salim; Raihaanun; JFlow Matulessy; Shafira Umm
- Cinematography: Faozan Rizal
- Edited by: Sastha Sunu
- Music by: Thoersi Argeswara
- Production company: Kamala Films
- Release dates: 26 October 2016 (Tokyo); 23 February 2017 (Indonesia)
- Running time: 82 minutes
- Country: Indonesia
- Language: Indonesian

Salawaku is a 2016 road drama film directed by Pritagita Arianegara in her directorial debut from a screenplay by Iqbal Fadly and Titien Wattimena. It stars Elko Kastanya as the titular role who embarks on a quest to find his older sister.

The film had its world premiere at the 29th Tokyo International Film Festival on 26 October 2016. It was nominated for eight Citra Awards, winning three for Best Supporting Actress for Raihaanun, Best Cinematography, and Best Child Performer for Kastanya.

== Premise ==
Salawaku escapes from his small village in Seram Island, Maluku in search of his older sister. Along the way, he encounters Saras, a tourist from Jakarta, and Kawanua, who are willing to help him.

== Cast ==
- Elko Kastanya as Salawaku
- Karina Salim as Saras
- Joshua "Jflow" Matulessy as Kawanua
- Raihaanun as Binaiya
- Semy Touwe as Upulatu

== Production ==
The principal photography took place from June to July 2015 in West Seram Regency on Seram Island, Maluku. Salawaku was the first film to receive support from the Indonesian Creative Economy Agency.

== Release ==
Salawaku had its world premiere at the 29th Tokyo International Film Festival on 26 October 2016 in the Asian Future section. The film was theatrically released in Indonesia on 10 February 2017. It was postponed from its initial date of 6 October 2016, maintaining its World Premiere status during the Tokyo International Film Festival, which took place on 26 October.

== Accolades ==
Award	Date of ceremony	Category	Recipient(s)	Result	Ref.
Indonesian Film Festival	6 November 2016	Best Picture	Ray Zulham and Michael Julius	Nominated	
Indonesian Film Festival	6 November 2016	Best Director	Pritagita Arianegara	Nominated	
Indonesian Film Festival	6 November 2016	Best Supporting Actor	JFlow Matulessy	Nominated	
Indonesian Film Festival	6 November 2016	Best Supporting Actress	Raihaanun	Won	
Indonesian Film Festival	6 November 2016	Best Cinematography	Faozan Rizal	Won	
Indonesian Film Festival	6 November 2016	Best Original Score	Thoersi Argeswara	Nominated	
Indonesian Film Festival	6 November 2016	Best Theme Song	Nico Veryandi for "Imaji Sunyi"	Nominated	
Indonesian Film Festival	6 November 2016	Best Child Performer	Elko Kastanya	Won	
