= What's Up with Love? =

2002 Indonesian film by Rudy Soedjarwo

Ada Apa dengan Cinta?
- Theatrical release poster
- Directed by: Rudy Soedjarwo
- Written by: Jujur Prananto; Prima Rusdi
- Produced by: Mira Lesmana; Riri Riza
- Starring: Dian Sastrowardoyo; Nicholas Saputra; Titi Kamal; Adinia Wirasti; Ladya Cheryl
- Cinematography: Roy Lolang
- Edited by: Dewi S. Alibasah
- Music by: Melly Goeslaw; Anto Hoed
- Distributed by: Miles Productions
- Release date: 8 February 2002
- Running time: 112 minutes
- Country: Indonesia
- Language: Indonesian
- Budget: $295,000
- Box office: $10 million

Ada Apa dengan Cinta? is a 2002 Indonesian coming-of-age romance film directed by Rudy Soedjarwo and produced by Mira Lesmana and Riri Riza. It tells the story of Cinta (Dian Sastrowardoyo), a popular high school student whose growing romance with the reserved Rangga (Nicholas Saputra) strains her relationships with her four closest friends.

The film was produced in 2001, with the initial screenplay written by Jujur Prananto and subsequently revised by Prima Rusdi and others. Songwriters Melly Goeslaw and Anto Hoed composed and arranged the film's songs. The film was released in Indonesian cinemas on 8 February 2002 and attracted approximately 2.7 million viewers, becoming a major box-office success. It won awards at several film festivals in Indonesia, including for Best Director and Best Actress.

Critics praised the romance, performances and music, but scholars have offered differing interpretations of the film's portrayal of women. The film helped renew public interest in Indonesian cinema following a decline in domestic production in the 1990s and encouraged subsequent teenage films featuring female protagonists. A sequel, Ada Apa dengan Cinta? 2, was released in 2016.

== Plot ==
Cinta is a popular, academically successful high school student who enjoys a comfortable life with her caring parents and four close friends, Alya, Karmen, Maura and Milly. The girls keep a shared diary in which they record their experiences and promise to stand by one another. However, Alya secretly suffers from domestic abuse at home and confides in Cinta.

Known for her poetry, Cinta enters the school's annual poetry competition but is surprised when Rangga, a quiet and withdrawn classmate, wins instead. Rangga avoids the award ceremony, and when Cinta approaches him for an interview for the school bulletin, he dismisses her as insincere. She later learns that Rangga never intended to enter the competition. His poem was submitted by his only friend, the school caretaker Mr Wardiman.

Cinta and Rangga initially dislike each other, and her friends also take a dislike to him. Their relationship briefly improves when Rangga thanks Cinta for returning his book, but another awkward encounter renews their hostility. When Rangga tries to apologise, he is attacked by Borné, a classmate who is pursuing Cinta.

Despite their differences, Cinta and Rangga gradually become friends. During a visit to his home, she discovers that he lives modestly with his father, Yusrizal, a political dissident whose outspoken views have led to threats and ruined his career. His troubled family history and isolation contrast sharply with Cinta's privileged upbringing. Only Alya knows about their growing friendship.

Cinta begins lying to her friends to spend time with Rangga, eventually ignoring Alya's urgent plea for help. That night, Alya is admitted to hospital after attempting suicide. At the hospital, Cinta's friends confront her about her dishonesty. Overcome with guilt, she cuts off contact with Rangga. After Alya recovers, a conversation between her and Cinta about Rangga inadvertently reveals their relationship to the other girls. Cinta apologises, but Maura advises her to move on.

Cinta tries to return to her former life, but her friends soon realise how deeply she feels for Rangga. When Karmen sees Rangga saying goodbye to Mr Wardiman, she learns that he is leaving the city. The girls put aside their differences and accompany Cinta to the airport, where Rangga and his father are preparing to leave for New York City.

Cinta catches up with Rangga before his departure. They confess their love for each other, but Rangga must still leave. Before boarding, he gives her a book and asks her to read the final page. After he leaves, Cinta discovers a poem he has written for her, promising to return before the full moon. As the girls drive away, they suddenly realise they have left their friend Mamet behind at the airport.

== Cast ==
- Dian Sastrowardoyo as Cinta
- Nicholas Saputra as Rangga
- Ladya Cheryl as Alya
- Titi Kamal as Maura
- Sissy Priscillia as Milly
- Adinia Wirasti as Karmen
- Dennis Adhiswara as Mamet
- Febian Ricardo as Borné
- Mang Diman as Mr. Wardiman
- Gito Rollies as Limbong

== Production ==
=== Development and writing ===
In 1997–98, producer Riri Riza wrote a synopsis about a teenage girl named Cinta and her relationship with her mother. The idea later developed into Eliana, Eliana!. Fellow producer Mira Lesmana later used the synopsis's original title, Ada Apa dengan Cinta?, for a new story about high-school students. Mira, Riri and writer Prima Rusdi worked with director Rudy Soedjarwo to develop the new story. Jujur Prananto wrote an initial screenplay, later revised by Prima, Rako Prijanto, Mira and Riri.

The team interviewed hundreds of Indonesian students while researching the film. In a 2004 interview, Prima said the filmmakers had came up with the issue of domestic abuse while researching the film. She also explained that the political storyline involving Rangga's father was intended to encourage young audiences to think about politics during the Reformasi, Indonesia's contemporary political era following the fall of the New Order regime in 1998.

=== Casting and filming ===
Actress Adinia Wirasti recalled that she was asked to audition in late 2000 or early 2001. She was later called back to meet with fellow actors Dian Sastrowardoyo, Sissy Priscillia, Titi Kamal and Ladya Cheryl, with Nicholas Saputra present on the same day. Mira later recalled that Dian had initially been considered for the role of Karmen before being cast as Cinta. Following the change, Cinta was written as a guitarist and Karmen as a basketball player.

After the actors playing Cinta's friends had been chosen, Rangga remained uncast. In a 2020 interview with actress Luna Maya, Mira recalled that she and director Rudy noticed Nicholas Saputra in a teenage magazine while searching for an actor to play Rangga. Both were struck by his intense gaze, which matched their idea of the character. Nico had initially auditioned for another role before being called back to audition for Rangga and meet the other cast members.

The film was produced in 2001, with Roy Lolang as cinematographer. Nico was in his second year of high school and began filming a week after the other actors because he had school exams. The school scenes were filmed at Kolese Gonzaga, and the book-market scenes in Kwitang, Jakarta.

== Music ==
Producer Mira Lesmana recruited singer-songwriter Melly Goeslaw and her husband, musician Anto Hoed, both members of the pop group Potret, to write songs for the film. Neither had worked on a film soundtrack before, but Mira was familiar with their music and encouraged them to accept the project. According to Anto, the initial request was for several songs rather than a musical score. After receiving the screenplay, Melly wrote the songs one by one, and Anto arranged the music as she completed them.

The soundtrack album was released by Aquarius Musikindo in February 2002 and contained 11 songs. Melly performed most of the tracks, including "Ku Bahagia", "Bimbang", and "Denting". She recorded the title song as a duet with Eric Erlangga, while Anda Perdana sang "Tentang Seseorang". Writing for Media Indonesia in 2018, Ardi Teristi Hardi attributed much of the film's appeal (and its 2016 sequel) to Melly and Anto's musical contributions, noting that the success of the original film's soundtrack had made the duo closely associated with the films.

== Themes ==
Film scholar David Hanan argues that Cinta's friendships remain central to the film even as her romance with Rangga develops. Hanan also points to the scene in which Cinta and her friends gather around Alya to comfort her, describing their physical closeness as a form of friendship he found absent from American teenage films.

Writing in Inside Indonesia, film scholar Hapsari Sulistyani argues that the film differs from earlier Indonesian teenage films in its portrayal of confident, fashionable schoolgirls. She nevertheless considers Cinta's relationship with Rangga a reinforcement of traditional male dominance. Hanan likewise criticises the film for giving greater recognition to Rangga's poetic talent, while he shows little appreciation for Cinta's writing. Arni Ernawati of Dian Nuswantoro University offers a different interpretation, arguing that Cinta's willingness to pursue Rangga and her efforts to preserve her friendships show women asserting control over their own choices.

Hanan also notes that Cinta and her friends speak informal Jakarta slang, while Rangga uses formal Indonesian, setting him apart from their social circle. He also argues that the references to poet Chairil Anwar and filmmaker Sjumandjaja remind young audiences of Indonesia's literary and film traditions in a culture increasingly shaped by consumerism. Hanan further connects the film to the era after President Suharto (Reformasi) through Rangga's father, who lost his government position after criticising corruption under Suharto. Ernawati also examines the abuse of Alya and her mother by Alya's father as a portrayal of violence against women in a patriarchal household.

== Release and reception ==
=== Theatrical release and box office ===
Ada Apa dengan Cinta? was released in Indonesian cinemas on 8 February 2002. It drew approximately 2.7 million cinemagoers, a record for an Indonesian film at the time. Hapsari Sulistyani noted that the average Indonesian film drew approximately 100,000 viewers in 2002, while the historical drama Ca-bau-kan attracted around 250,000.

The film screened in the A Window on Asian Cinema programme at the 2002 Busan International Film Festival. The film was released in Malaysia in 2003, where it was particularly well received by young adults. For the film's 10th anniversary, it was screened again at Blok M Square 21 in Jakarta, initially scheduled for 9–10 February 2012. Following strong demand, organisers extended the screenings until 12 February.

=== Critical response ===
In the programme notes for the 2002 Busan International Film Festival, South Korean film critic Kang So-won observed that the film explores more complex issues without losing its emotional tone, even though it follows the usual patterns of films about young people. In a 2010 review for the Indonesian cinema publication Montase, Febrian Andhika praised the chemistry between Cinta and Rangga, particularly their playful arguments and the warmth of their romantic scenes. He also praised the music and poetry, describing the closing scene as a satisfying conclusion that avoided excessive sentimentality. Writing in Inside Indonesia, Hapsari Sulistyani contrasted Cinta and her friends with the rebellious girls in earlier Indonesian teenage films, whose behaviour was typically corrected by the end of the story.

== Accolades ==
Ada Apa dengan Cinta? won seven awards at the 2002 Bandung Film Festival, including those for film, directing and screenplay. At the 2004 Indonesian Film Festival, it received 12 competitive nominations, winning three Citra Awards and an audience-choice award. The ceremony marked the festival's return after a 12-year hiatus. The title song also won a songwriting award at the 2002 Anugerah Musik Indonesia and two awards at the 2003 Anugerah Planet Muzik.

| Year | Award | Category | Recipient(s) | Result | Source |
|---|---|---|---|---|---|
| 2002 | Bandung Film Festival | Best Film | Mira Lesmana and Riri Riza | Won | |
| 2002 | Bandung Film Festival | Best Director | Rudy Soedjarwo | Won | |
| 2002 | Bandung Film Festival | Best Screenplay | Jujur Prananto, Prima Rusdi, Rako Prijanto and Riri Riza | Won | |
| 2002 | Bandung Film Festival | Best Cinematography | Roy Lolang | Won | |
| 2002 | Bandung Film Festival | Best Editing | Dewi S. Alibasah | Won | |
| 2002 | Bandung Film Festival | Best Music | Melly Goeslaw and Anto Hoed | Won | |
| 2002 | Bandung Film Festival | Best Makeup | Lita Dwiyana | Won | |
| 2002 | Anugerah Musik Indonesia | Best Songwriter | Melly Goeslaw and Anto Hoed, "Ada Apa dengan Cinta?" | Won | |
| 2003 | Anugerah Planet Muzik | Best Song | "Ada Apa dengan Cinta?" | Won | |
| 2003 | Anugerah Planet Muzik | Most Popular Song | "Ada Apa dengan Cinta?" | Won | |
| 2004 | Indonesian Film Festival | Best Feature Film | Mira Lesmana and Riri Riza | Nominated | |
| 2004 | Indonesian Film Festival | Best Director | Rudy Soedjarwo | Won | |
| 2004 | Indonesian Film Festival | Best Actor | Nicholas Saputra | Nominated | |
| 2004 | Indonesian Film Festival | Best Actress | Dian Sastrowardoyo | Won | |
| 2004 | Indonesian Film Festival | Best Supporting Actor | Mang Diman | Nominated | |
| 2004 | Indonesian Film Festival | Best Supporting Actress | Ladya Cheryl | Nominated | |
| 2004 | Indonesian Film Festival | Best Original Screenplay | Jujur Prananto | Nominated | |
| 2004 | Indonesian Film Festival | Best Cinematography | Roy Lolang | Nominated | |
| 2004 | Indonesian Film Festival | Best Art Direction | Adrianto Sinaga | Nominated | |
| 2004 | Indonesian Film Festival | Best Editing | Dewi S. Alibasah | Nominated | |
| 2004 | Indonesian Film Festival | Best Sound | Adityawan Susanto | Nominated | |
| 2004 | Indonesian Film Festival | Best Music | Melly Goeslaw and Anto Hoed | Won | |
| 2004 | Indonesian Film Festival | Audience Favourite Film | Ada Apa dengan Cinta? | Won | |

== Legacy ==
Ada Apa dengan Cinta? helped restore public interest in Indonesian films after domestic film production declined during the 1990s. Hapsari Sulistyani argued that its success encouraged more teenage films with female leads, following a period in which the genre had largely featured male protagonists. The film also propelled Dian Sastrowardoyo and Nicholas Saputra to fame.

The film was adapted into a television series in 2003, starring Ririn Dwi Ariyanti as Cinta and Revaldo as Rangga. In November 2014, six original cast members reunited in a 10-minute promotional short for the messaging application LINE, which depicted Cinta and Rangga meeting again after 12 years apart. The short attracted millions of online views and strengthened Mira Lesmana's plans for a feature-length sequel. A novelisation of the original film by Silvarani was published in April 2016, ahead of the release of Ada Apa dengan Cinta? 2 later that month. Directed by Riri Riza, the sequel reunited Dian and Nico and attracted approximately 3.7 million viewers.

The supporting characters Milly and Mamet became the subjects of the 2018 comedy spin-off Milly & Mamet: Ini Bukan Cinta & Rangga, directed by Ernest Prakasa and starring Sissy Priscillia and Dennis Adhiswara. In October 2025, Riri's musical remake Rangga & Cinta was released, starring Leya Princy and El Putra Sarira, with Nico among its producers. In September 2026, the promotional short Bahasa Cinta yang Beda continued Cinta and Rangga's story ten years after the 2016 sequel.
