= Affliction (2021 film) =

- Promotional poster
- Directed by: Teddy Soeriaatmadja
- Written by: Teddy Soeriaatmadja
- Produced by: Andrea Wijaya; Russell Wijaya; Uwie Balfas; Teddy Soeriaatmadja
- Starring: Raihaanun Soeriaatmadja; Tutie Kirana; Ibnu Jamil
- Cinematography: Robie Taswin
- Edited by: Eric Primasetio
- Music by: Bobby Surjadi
- Production companies: Karuna Pictures; Roemah Rumah Films
- Distributed by: Netflix
- Release date: 21 January 2021 (Indonesia)
- Country: Indonesia
- Language: Indonesian

Affliction is a 2021 Indonesian horror film directed and written by Teddy Soeriaatmadja and starring Raihaanun Soeriaatmadja, Tutie Kirana and Ibnu Jamil. In the film, a wife slowly learns the horrifying truth of her husband after visiting his dying mother's house in a rural Central Java village.

== Plot ==
Further encouraged due to a strained relationship with his mother Dayu, Hasan left his rural Central Java home to pursue a career as a psychologist in Jakarta. He has a wife, Nina; and two children, Tasha and Ryan. Nina had just lost her mother from an illness, but believes she decapitated herself with a knife. Dayu's caretaker informs Nina that Dayu's dementia is worsening supernaturally. Upon Nina's request, who fears that her mother's fate would be that of Dayu's, Hasan reluctantly brings the entire family there to take Dayu to Jakarta. However Dayu rejects, and Hasan leaves his family temporarily on work basis. Experiences of paranormal activity, such as Dayu alleged to hearing someone say "Ari Kibar" and a shadow standing randomly, occur. Dayu also attempts to cut herself. One day, she drinks ginger tea Nina made and inexplicably dies.

One day, Nina sees the caretaker going somewhere. She follows her and sees her enter a remote house, meaning she is not a real caretaker. Inside, Nina sees news clippings revealing that Hasan had a friend named Dimas. Furthermore, she learns that "Ari Kibar" means "Arah kiblat" ('Qibla heading'); in Dayu's home, the heading faces a tree, and buried in it are human bones. Upon return, Hasan reveals that he and Dimas used to obsess on impressing Dayu with their skills. Amid a fight, he kills him with a knife. Dayu hides the secret from Dimas' family. Raging, Nina brings her children to flee without Hasan, who then has an epiphany to kill Nina. While Nina is packing, he strangles her, but she is saved by a neighbor related to Dimas who eavesdropped the confession, killing Hasan with a spade. He and Dimas are properly buried by dawn.

== Cast ==
- Raihaanun Soeriaatmadja as Nina
- Tutie Kirana as Hasan's mother
- Ibnu Jamil as Hasan
- Abiyyu Barakbah as Ryan
- Tasya Putri as Tasya
- Dea Panendra as Narsih
- Hetty Reksoprodjo as Oma
- Ernanta Kusuma Panca as Ustad Dirman
- Fajrul Ravi as Dimas Rangga
- Abirama Putra A. as young Hasan

== Release ==
Netflix acquired the distribution rights to Affliction, releasing it on its streaming service on 21 January 2021.
