= Prima Rusdi =

Indonesian screenwriter and writer (born 1967)

Prima Rusdi (born 31 January 1967) is an Indonesian screenwriter and writer.

== Life ==
Rusdi was born in Göttingen, West Germany and raised in Jakarta, Indonesia. She graduated from the University of Indonesia, and has a master's degree in Communications from the University of Canberra, Australia, and initially wanted to become a journalist. She began her career as a writer in 2000 after quitting her job as a copywriter with a multinational advertising agency. She won several top advertising awards during her career as a copywriter. She co-wrote her first film Eliana, Eliana (2002) with director Riri Riza, during which she also co-wrote What's Up with Love? (2001) with Jujur Prananto. In 2004, Rusdi won two awards from Festival Film Indonesia for Eliana, Eliana (shared with director Riri Riza) and for a teleplay called The Big Celebration. Both Eliana and The Big Celebration were produced by Miles Films, a production house that Rusdi has described as her 'film school'. In 2005 she co-wrote Waking Banyu with writer Rayya Makarim, and in 2006 she wrote Garasi, a coming-of-age film produced by What's with Love producer, Mira Lesmana. Garasi is the directorial debut from Agung Sentausa, a close friend of Rusdi's who also received his film training from Miles Films.

Throughout 2006, Rusdi was one of the mentors for a series of film workshops conducted for students/teenagers, including a group of young detainees at a juvenile correctional center located in Jakarta. She wrote a screenplay for a short film directed by Lasja Fauzia called "(Almost) A Mischance", and is distributed by a Singaporean distribution company that leads the short film to circle the international festivals. She also worked with Malaysian stage director/writer Ann Lee adapting Lee's script, "Hang Li Poh" into Indonesian. One chapter from the adaptation was performed during the International Women Playwrights Conference in November 2006. Later that year, Rusdi was one of the programmers (alongside short filmmaker Farishad Latjuba, documentary filmmaker Alex Sihar, and artist Ade Darmawan) for the first Southeast Asian Short Film Competitions held in Jakarta. She was nominated at Festival Film Indonesia 2006 for her screenplay "Garasi".

In January 2007, Prima Rusdi, along with about 300 filmmakers including Mira Lesmana, Riri Riza, Nia Dinata, returned their awards from the government-funded Festival Film Indonesia to the Minister of Arts and Culture as a protest against the Indonesian government for the lack of support and transparency and a series of restrictive policies applied to the Indonesian film industry. This movement is known as MFI (Masyarakat Film Indonesia) or the Indonesian Film Society Movement. Later that year she served as a jury member on a jury chaired by British producer Jan Harlan at the 2007 International Film Festival in Bratislava, Slovakia. Other members were director Royston Tan (Singapore), actress Klara Issova (Czech Republic) and screenwriter Zuzana Liová (Slovakia).

In 2005, she had her first book, The Journey, published by Terrant Books. Her second book, 1095 Magical Days was published by KATAKITA in 2006. Prima has her third book published by Gramedia in 2007. The book is entitled Bikin Film kata 40 Pekerja Film or (Indonesian) Films According to 40 Indonesian Filmmakers. She is currently in the process of completing some scripts.
