= Melky Goeslaw =

Indonesian singer

Background information
- Born: 7 May 1947; Morotai, Indonesia
- Origin: Jakarta
- Died: 20 December 2006 (aged 59) Jakarta, Indonesia
- Genres: Pop, rock

Melky Jannes Goeslaw (7 May 1947 – 20 December 2006) was an Indonesian singer and boxing manager. He is the father of singer Melliana Cessy "Melly" Goeslaw. His song, "Pergi untuk Kembali", was chosen by Rolling Stone Indonesia as the 117th-best Indonesian song of all time in 2009.

== Biography ==
=== Early life and musical career ===
Melky Goeslaw was born in Morotai, an island off Halmahera in the Maluku Islands, on 7 May 1947. He became active in music in 1964, when he formed in band Octa Nada as lead guitar and leader; he later joined the bands Nada Anda and Nada Buana as bass. He also toured with Bob Tutupoly and sang rock songs at various nightclubs during the early 1970s; during this period, he participated diligently in song festivals.

In 1974, Goeslaw was a finalist in the National Popular Song Festival (Festival Lagu Popular Nasional); the following year, after placing third in the Jakarta-level festival, Goeslaw rose to fame by winning the National Popular Song Festival with the song "Pergi untuk Kembali" ("Leave to Return"), beating other singers such as Berlian Hutauruk (fourth) and professional singer Hetty Koes Endang (fifth); he was immediately put on the same level of popularity as established singers such as Broery and Hetty Koes Endang.

In 1977, pairing with Diana Nasution, Goeslaw came in second place at the National Singers Festival (Festival Penyanyi Tingkat Nasional). The two, wearing black outfits and white highlights in their hair, sang the song "Bila Cengkeh Berbunga" ("If the Cloves Blossom") by Nasution's husband, Mingoes Tahitu. They came in closely behind Hetty Koes Endang but ahead of Ira Puspita, who performed while three months pregnant; despite coming in second, the pair were the Indonesian magazine Tempo's choice for best performance of the festival.

Two years later, during an increase in the popularity of dangdut music, Goeslaw attempted to record some dangdut songs. However, he found it more difficult than pop and rock; one of his considerations was that the vocals were similar in nature to the Islamic qasida – as a Protestant, Goeslaw felt it was against his religion. Most of his hit singles, such as "Hiroshima dan Nagasaki" ("Hiroshima and Nagasaki"), "Tuhan Semesta Alam" ("God of the Natural Universe"), and "Dansa Yo Dansa" ("Dance, Yeah Dance"), were either pop or rock.

=== Boxing manager, declining health, and death ===
In 1987, together with fellow musician Enteng Tanamal, Goeslaw became the manager of former International Boxing Federation champion Ellyas Pical. Pical chose Goeslaw after having a falling out with former managers Simson Tambunan dan Anton Sihotang, and short-term managers Dali Sofari dan Khairus Sahel. For his part, Goeslaw was glad that he could manage Pical, immediately choosing Wiem Gomies to be Pical's trainer.

In 1989, Goeslaw suffered from a heart attack. As a result, he cut back on his smoking and drinking and began attending church more often. In 1995 he won the Kawakami Prize for his life's work.

Goeslaw was diagnosed with breast cancer in 2004. According to his daughter Ully, he also suffered from trouble with his lungs; he was also reported to have diabetes and a heart condition. He died in Jakarta at 16:00 local time (UTC+7) on 20 December 2006 while waiting for an ambulance from MMC Hospital in Kuningan, South Jakarta, after collapsing at his home in Petukangan Utara. He is buried at Tanah Kusir cemetery next to his son, Tansa. According to Sorta Tobing, a reporter for Tempo, Goeslaw's death led to a greater public interest in male breast cancer in Indonesia.

== Accolades and legacy ==
In their December 2009 issue, Rolling Stone Indonesia listed "Pergi untuk Kembali" ("Leave to Return"), written by Mingoes Tahitu and sung by Goeslaw, as the 117th-best Indonesian song of all time.

== Personal life ==
Goeslaw was married four times. With one of his wives, whom he later divorced, he had Melly Goeslaw. Goeslaw was a Protestant.
