= Soe Hok Gie =

Chinese Indonesian activist

- 史福義
- Soe at a rally on Mount Pangrango (1967)
- Born: 17 December 1942; Djakarta, Japanese-occupied East Indies
- Died: 16 December 1969 (aged 26); Semeru, East Java, Indonesia
- Resting place: Jakarta, Indonesia; 6°10′19″S 106°49′09″E
- Education: University of Indonesia
- Notable work: Catatan Seorang Demonstran
- Parent(s): Salam Sutrawan (Soe Lie-Piet) (father) & Nio Hoey-An (mother)
- Relatives: Arief Budiman (Soe Hok-Djin) (brother)

Soe Hok Gie
- Traditional Chinese: 史福義
- Simplified Chinese: 史福义
Transcriptions
Standard Mandarin
- Hanyu Pinyin: Shǐ Fúyì
- Wade–Giles: Shi Fu-i
Southern Min
- Hokkien POJ: Sú Hok-Gī

Soe Hok Gie (17 December 1942 – 16 December 1969) was a Chinese Indonesian activist who opposed the successive dictatorships of Presidents Sukarno and Suharto.

== Overview ==
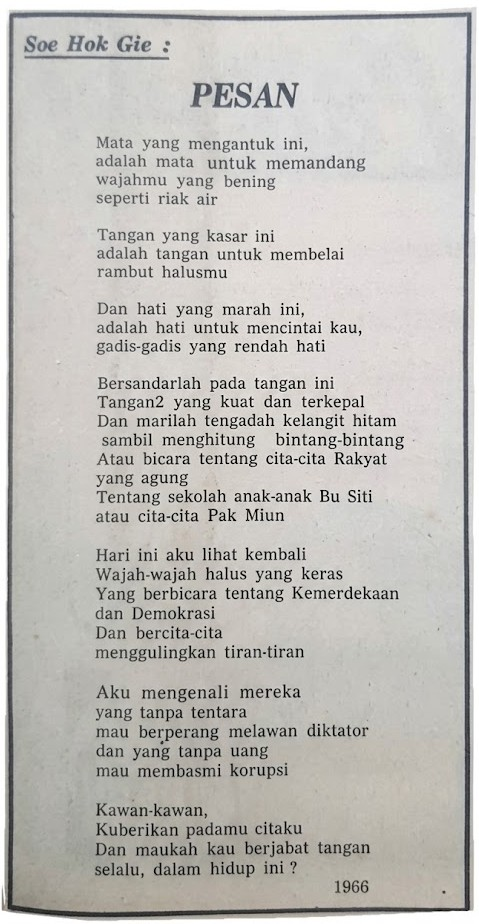
A poem by Soe Hok Gie (1966)

Soe was an ethnic Chinese Roman Catholic, the fourth of five children in his family. His father Soe Lie Piet was a literary writer and magazine editor, and his elder brother Arief Budiman was a sociologist and lecturer at Satya Wacana Christian University and a vocal critical voice in Indonesian politics.

After spending his final years of senior high school at Kanisius, Soe attended the University of Indonesia (UI) from 1962 until 1969; upon finishing university he became a lecturer at his alma mater until his sudden death shortly before he was to turn 27. It was during his time as a student that Soe became an active dissident, protesting against President Sukarno and the PKI. Soe was a productive writer, with articles published in such newspapers as Kompas, Harian Kami, Sinar Harapan, Mahasiswa Indonesia, and Indonesia Raya. After the release of Riri Riza's Gie in 2005, his articles were compiled by Stanley and Aris Santoso and republished with the title Zaman Peralihan (Transition Era) by publisher GagasMedia.

An avid proponent of living close to nature, Soe quoted Walt Whitman in his diary: "Now I see the secret of the making of the best person. It is to grow in the open air and to eat and sleep with the earth". In 1965, Soe helped found Mapala UI, a student environmentalist organisation. He enjoyed hiking, and indeed died through inhaling poisonous gas while hiking up the volcanic Mount Semeru on the day before his 27th birthday. He was laid to rest in what is now the Museum of the Park of Memorial Stones (Museum Taman Prasasti) in Central Jakarta.

Fittingly, Soe once wrote in his diary:

"Seorang filsuf Yunani pernah menulis ... nasib terbaik adalah tidak dilahirkan, yang kedua dilahirkan tapi mati muda, dan yang tersial adalah umur tua. Rasa-rasanya memang begitu. Bahagialah mereka yang mati muda."

This roughly translates to English as "A Greek philosopher once wrote ... The best fate is to never have been born, second is to be born but die young, and the most unfortunate of all is to [reach] old age. This feels pretty right: Happy are those who die young." Soe attributed the statement, which echoes similar comments from Friedrich Nietzsche, to an anonymous Greek philosopher.

His diary was published in 1983, under the title Catatan Seorang Demonstran (English: Annotations of a Demonstrator). Soe's university thesis was also published, as Di Bawah Lantera Merah (Under the Red Lantern).

Soe's diary served as the inspiration for a 2005 film, Gie, which was directed by Riri Riza and starred Nicholas Saputra as Soe Hok Gie. Soe is also the subject of a 1997 book, written by Dr. John Maxwell and entitled Soe Hok-Gie: Diary of a Young Indonesian Intellectual. The book was translated into Indonesian in 2001, and re-titled Soe Hok-Gie: Pergulatan Intelektual Muda Melawan Tirani (which roughly translates to English as Soe Hok-Gie: A Young Intellectual's Struggle Against Tyranny).

== See also ==
- Gie, a 2005 film based on his life
- List of Chinese Indonesians

== Bibliography ==
- Soe, Hok Gie (1983), Catatan Seorang Demonstran (in Indonesian), Jakarta: Lembaga Penelitian, Pendidikan dan Penerangan Ekonomi dan Sosial.
- Soe, Hok Gie (1990), Di Bawah Lentera Merah: Riwayat Sarekat Islam Semarang, 1917–1920 (in Indonesian), Jakarta: Frantz Fanon Foundation.
- Soe, Hok Gie (1995), Zaman Peralihan (in Indonesian), Yogyakarta: Yayasan Bentang Budaya.
- Soe, Hok Gie (1997), Orang-orang di Persimpangan Kiri Jalan: Kisah Pemberontakan Madiun 1948 (in Indonesian), Yogyakarta: Yayasan Bentang Budaya, ISBN 978-979-8793-31-8.
