= Athirah =

2016 film directed by Riri Riza

- Film poster
- Directed by: Riri Riza
- Written by: Salman Aristo; Riri Riza
- Produced by: Mira Lesmana
- Starring: Cut Mini; Christoffer Nelwan
- Cinematography: Yadi Sugandi
- Production company: Miles Films
- Release date: September 29, 2016
- Running time: 81 minutes
- Country: Indonesia
- Language: Indonesian

Athirah is a 2016 Indonesian drama film directed by Riri Riza. The film won five awards at the Indonesian Film Festival in 2017, including Best Feature Film.

== Accolades ==
Award	Year	Category	Recipient	Result
Usmar Ismail Awards	2017	Best Actress	Cut Mini	Won
Usmar Ismail Awards	2017	Best Art Direction	Eros Eflin	Won
Asia Pasific Screen Awards	2017	Best Actress	Cut Mini	Nominated
Indonesian Film Festival	2017	Best Male Supporting Actor	Arman Dewarti	Nominated
Indonesian Film Festival	2017	Best Cinematography	Yadi Sugandi	Nominated
Indonesian Film Festival	2017	Best Soundtrack Songs		Nominated
Indonesian Film Festival	2017	Best Sound Editing & Mixing	Satrio Budiono	Nominated
Indonesian Film Festival	2017	Best Fashion Designer	Chitra Subiyakto	Nominated
Indonesian Film Festival	2017	Best Art Director	Eros Eflin	Won
Indonesian Film Festival	2017	Best Adapted Screenplay	Salman Aristo, Riri Riza	Won
Indonesian Film Festival	2017	Best Lead Actress	Cut Mini	Won
Indonesian Film Festival	2017	Best Director	Riri Riza	Won
Indonesian Film Festival	2017	Best Film	Mira Lesmana	Won
