= Melly Goeslaw =

Indonesian singer and actress (born 1974)

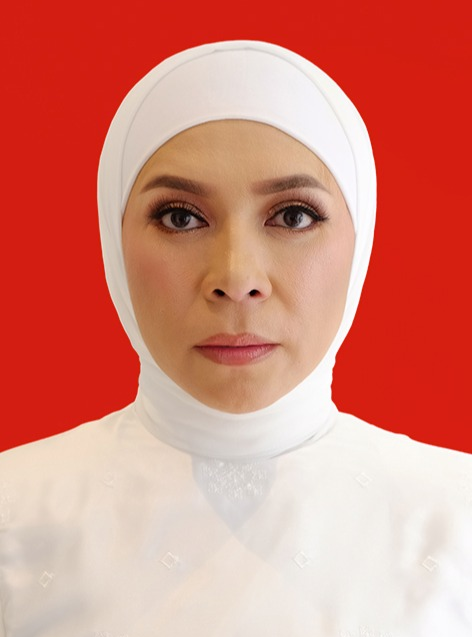
- Melly Goeslaw in 2023
- Born: Meliana Cessy Goeslaw; 7 January 1974 (age 52); Bandung, West Java, Indonesia
- Occupations: Celebrity, singer, politician, songwriter
- Years active: 1987–present
- Spouse: Anto Hoed (m. 1995)
- Father: Melky Goeslaw
- Musical career
- Genres: Pop; R&B; Jazz; EDM
- Instrument: Vocals
- Labels: Aquarius; 100%; Musica
- Member of: Potret
- Website: mellygoeslaw.id

Melliana Cessy Goeslaw (born 7 January 1974) is an Indonesian singer, songwriter, politician, and actress.

Born in Bandung, Melly Goeslaw began singing in the fifth grade, then began writing songs and took work as a backing vocalist for Elfa Secioria in high school. This led to her family and her moving to Jakarta to further her career. While providing backing vocals for Katon Bagaskara's promotional tour, she met Anto Hoed and Andi Ayunir. After marrying Hoed, the three formed the band Potret in 1995. Their 1995 debut album was well received, bringing Goeslaw and her bandmates to fame. As of 2011, she has written over 500 songs.

After releasing several albums with Potret, Melly Goeslaw attempted to begin a solo career, releasing her self-titled debut album Melly in 1999. Although Melly sold well, she became more popular as a solo artist after providing the soundtrack for the 2002 hit film Ada Apa Dengan Cinta? together with her husband. She later released many solo albums and soundtracks. In 2005, she released a collection of short stories to celebrate her tenth anniversary as a popular musician; four years later, she directed a concert to celebrate the bicentenary of Bandung city.

Melly Goeslaw's onstage persona has been compared to Björk, with "eccentric" costumes, heavy make-up, and "wild" hair colours. Her early songs have been described by The Jakarta Post as being "deliberately antagonistic", with controversial themes including materialism, sadomasochism, and violence against women. Two of her songs with Potret, "Salah" and "Bunda", were selected by Rolling Stone Indonesia as some of the best Indonesian songs of all time, while her work with Ada Apa dengan Cinta? garnered her and her husband a Citra Award at the 2004 Indonesian Film Festival. However, Rolling Stone notes a decline in song quality after Ada Apa dengan Cinta?. According to The Jakarta Post, Melly Goeslaw is one of the most sought after movie songwriters in Indonesia.

== Early life ==
Melly Goeslaw was born in Bandung on 7 January 1974. She is the daughter of Melky Goeslaw, a singer and songwriter, and his wife Ersi Sukaesih. After her parents' divorce, Melly Goeslaw was raised by her mother; with her sister Yuli, who now serves as her manager, was born from a second marriage. While in elementary school, she enjoyed writing poetry, later recalling that she "was happiest when doodling on paper, writing [her] poetry". While she was in the fifth grade, she began singing after being convinced by her mother, who was convinced that Melly Goeslaw could sing like her father; although originally she did not want to be a singer.

She later switched to songwriting while in high school, writing lyrics on her napkins and schoolbooks and recording her humming on a Walkman because she could not play any instruments. During high school, she worked as a backing vocalist for Elfa Secioria. Her family eventually moved to Jakarta to further her singing career, and she was requested to be a backing vocalist for three different pop singers. At one point, she was recording at three different studios every day. The money that she earned convinced her to continue singing.

== Career ==
=== 1995–1999: Potret ===
After replacing a backing vocalist for Katon Bagaskara's promotional tour for the album Dinda, Melly Goeslaw met Anto Hoed and Arie Ayunir. Aside from married with Hoed later that year, they went on to form the band Potret. The band's first album was released in 1995, with the song "Terbujuk" ("Seduced"), dealing with "the ultimate material girl", becoming instantly popular. The popular band between 1995 and 1998. While with Potret, Melly Goeslaw wrote numerous songs. Some were written conservatively as they were ordered by singers such as Krisdayanti and Ruth Sahanaya, other songs, generally the more "biting" ones, were used for Potret's albums.

One of the songs on Potret's third album, "Diam" ("Silent"), which dealt with the abuse of women, caused some controversy due to the perceived amount of violence in the music video. Despite this controversy, it won Video Musik Indonesia's award for best interpretation of a song.

=== 1999–2009: Solo career ===
In 1999, Melly Goeslaw started her solo career with her self-titled debut album, which sold well. Her second album, the soundtrack for the 2002 teen film What's Up with Love? (Ada Apa Dengan Cinta?), in which most songs were sung by her and written by her and her husband, led to her being more popular as a solo artist than with Potret; she was also given the nickname the Queen of Soundtrack. Its soundtrack later won Best Soundtrack at the Indonesian Film Festival.

Melly Goeslaw later provided the soundtracks for 2003 film Eiffel... I'm in Love, 2005 film Apa Artinya Cinta? (What's the Meaning of Love?), 2007 film The Butterfly, and 2009 film Ketika Cinta Bertasbih (When Love Prays). She considered the writing of songs for Ketika Cinta Bertasbih to be more difficult than her previous work in teen romances, as it was a religious film. As such, she felt that she had to be extra careful.

In 2005, Melly Goeslaw released a story collection she had written to celebrate her tenth years as a singer. One of the stories, "Tentang Dia" ("About Him (or Her)"), was later filmed by Rudy Soedjarwo, the director of Ada Apa dengan Cinta?. In 2008, Melly Goeslaw wrote and sang "Dibius Cinta" ("Drugged by Love") for the Cicakman 2: Planet Hitam (Cicakman 2: Black Planet) soundtrack with Malaysian singer and film director Yusri, from the band KRU. Melly Goeslaw permitted to help with the scoring after watching the original Cicak Man.

After initially refusing to perform solo concerts because of creative differences with the event managers, in 2009 Melly Goeslaw held her first concert, "Glow, Melly Live in Concert", at Senayan Stadium in Jakarta. The concert was directed by John Fair Kaune and produced by Krisdayanti's KD Productions, featured a "virtual duet" with Melly Goeslaw's deceased father and was divided into two portions, one featuring songs from her time with Potret, and one with songs from her solo career. It also featured new songs written by Hoed especially for the concert. The following year she was head of Kampung GASS, an organising committee for a concert celebrating the 200th year since the founding of Bandung.

=== 2010–2019: Mentoring new singers, "Hara" and "Bintang Di Hati" ===
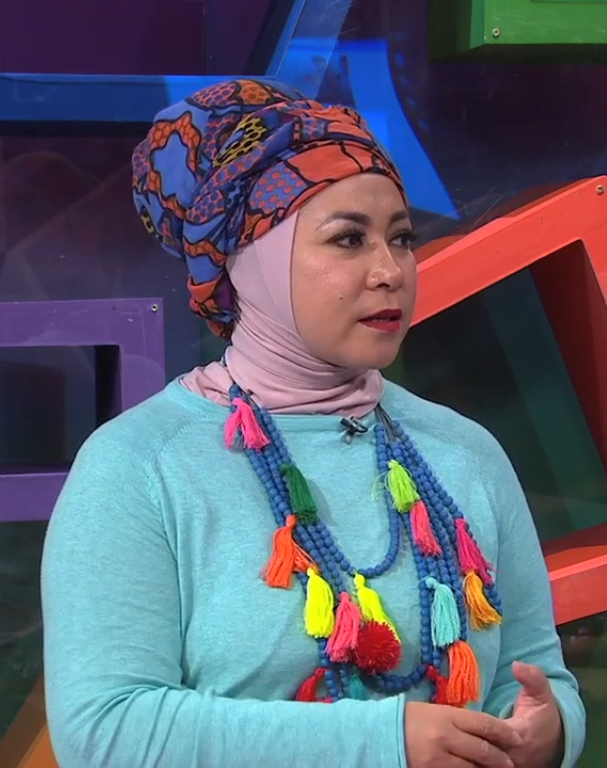
Goeslaw in 2014

Melly Goeslaw is also active scouting for new singers and assisting others, having supported the careers of pop singers Irwansyah and Acha Septriasa. In 2011, she invited aspiring singers to post videos of themselves singing her songs to YouTube or her Facebook profile, later noting that she had already discovered several new talents in that manner. As of 2011, she has written over 500 songs. Melly Goeslaw released a compilation album, Balance, in January 2013.

From September through November 2015, Goeslaw became judge on La Academia Junior Indonesia for their second season. In September 2017, it was announced that Goeslaw return to wrote songs for Eiffel... I'm in Love 2, a sequel to Eiffel... I'm in Love. In December, Goeslaw announced as the performer and writer of "Hara" ("Elements"). In September 2018, she wrote and recorded "Bintang Di Hati" ("Stars in Heart") for the film Dancing in the Rain. It was also used as the theme song for television drama Samudra Cinta (Ocean of Love) in 2019.

=== 2020–present ===
In 2020, Melly Goeslaw wrote "Hello" for Australian-Indonesian singer Izellah Conelly. Then, she released "Siap Terluka" ("Ready to Get Hurt"), the soundtrack for Istri Kedua (The Second Wife). In 2023, she released her Sundanese-language debut single, "Kalem Aya Urang" ("Luckily We Are Here").

== Songwriting ==
Melly Goeslaw has noted that her most popular songs are generally those which are written quickly, citing the award-winning "Menghitung Hari" ("Counting the Days"), which was written in four days, as an example. She has noted that she abandons songs which leave her with a writer's block, as even when they are finished they are not well received. Her husband does the arrangement, sometimes meaning that songs are put on hold because he is busy.

The Jakarta Post has described her lyrics as being "deliberately antagonistic", to which Goeslaw has agreed. Her songs written while with Potret include themes of materialism, sexual deviation, "misbehaving women", flatulence, and sadomasochism, she has said that she tries to avoid writing about "issues of ethnicity, religion, race and intergroup relations, especially political matters". The Jakarta Post also calls her a "deft satirist". She does not consider herself a feminist. It has been said that "She wrote not so much about the empowerment of women as about women living in reality". She has stated that her lyrics are not of the "'hear me roar' type".

== Fashion ==
Melly Goeslaw is known for wearing "eccentric" costumes when performing, leading to her being compared to Icelandic singer Björk, whom she admires. She also dyed her hair in "wild colors" and applied heavy stage make up in the late 1990s, when contemporary Indonesian singers were focusing on "conventional" beauty. In 2008, Goeslaw said that her make up and hairstyles used to hide her insecurity when she was first starting. She has continued to use them because it is "part of the package", although she now discusses ideas with her creative team.

== Awards and recognition ==
Melly Goeslaw's songs have won awards. In the first Indonesian Film Festival (after the festival's twelve-year hiatus between 1992 and 2004), Melly Goeslaw and her husband won Best Soundtrack for their work in Ada Apa Dengan Cinta?; it was one of three awards won by the movie at the festival, which covered films from 2002 to 2004. The Jakarta Post calls her Indonesia's most sought after movie songwriter, and notes that her songs have been successfully covered by other singers. Her work as a songwriter has led to her becoming an active proponent of intellectual property.

In 2009, Rolling Stone Indonesia listed two songs that Melly Goeslaw performed while with Potret in its list of the 150 Best Indonesian Songs of All Time, both of which were from the album Potret II. "Salah" ("Wrong") was ranked 74th, being noted as the best example of Melly Goeslaw's "freshly, directly, and often provocative styles" (Note: Original: "... nuansa segar, lugas, dan kerapkali provokatif ...") when writing songs and writing that her "sweet" (Note: Original: "... manis ...") vocals challenged the paradigm that a singer singing about an affair should be either a victim or full of revenge. The other song, "Bunda" ("Mother") was ranked at 110; it was noted being capable of making anyone, "even the most cruel man", (Note: Original: "... bahkan seorang pria paling bengis pun ...") pause for a moment to think of their mother. Rolling Stone Indonesia noted a decrease in the quality of Melly Goeslaw's songs since Ada Apa Dengan Cinta?.

== Personal life ==
Melly Goeslaw is a devout Muslim, and married to guitarist Anto Hoed. They have two children, named Anakku Lelaki "Ale" Hoed and Pria Bernama "Abe" Hoed (literally My Son Hoed and Man Named Hoed). In her spare time she enjoys shopping, playing with her children, and internet browsing; she has stated that she finds it increasingly difficult to enjoy shopping due to being constantly recognised. She has stated that she prefers being backstage over giving concerts, as she does not have to wear make-up or rehearse.

== Discography ==
=== Albums ===
==== Studio or compilation albums ====
Sources: (Note: Because of lack of sources, the exact category of the albums are unknown, and the list may be incomplete.)

- Pilihanku Deritaku (1988) (Note: as Meliana Cessy)
- Melly (1999)
- Intuisi (2005)
- Mind 'N Soul (2007) (Note: Also written as "Mindnsoul")
- Dancing in the Silence (2011)
- Balance (2013)
- Queen of Soundtrack (2013)
- Argentium (2020)

One compilation album, titled Melly Goeslaw Masterpieces is tagged as Various Artists on online music services.

==== Soundtrack albums ====
- Ada Apa dengan Cinta? (2002)
- Eiffel... I'm in Love (2003)
- Apa Artinya Cinta? (2005)
- Bukan Bintang Biasa with Anto Hoed (2007)
- The Butterfly (2008)
- Ketika Cinta Bertasbih (2009)
- Ada Apa dengan Cinta 2 (2016)
- Eiffel... I'm in Love 2 (2018)

=== Extended plays ===
- Glow (2009)

=== Singles ===
- Apa Kata Dunia? (duet with Deddy Mizwar) (2007)
- Catatanku (duet with Baim) (2009)
- Jika Aku Menjadi (Soundtrack album from Jika Aku Menjadi reality show on Trans TV) (2010)
- Demi Cinta (Di Bawah Lindungan Ka'bah soundtrack album) (2011)
- Cinta Suci Zahrana (Cinta Suci Zahrana soundtrack album, duet with Anto Hoed) (2012)
- Cinta & Ibadah (Cinta & Ibadah soundtrack album) (2014)
- Promise (Promise soundtrack album) (2017)
- Memang Kenapa Bila Aku Perempuan? (Kartini soundtrack album, duet with Gita Gutawa) (2017)
- Bintang Di Hati (Dancing in the Rain and Samudra Cinta soundtrack album) (2018–2019)
- Kusadari (duet with Rita Effendy) (2019)
- Siap Terluka (Istri Kedua soundtrack album) (2020)
- Berkumpul Di Surga (2020)

== Filmography ==
- Kabayan Jadi Milyuner (2010)
- Milly & Mamet (2018)
