= Mira Lesmana =

Indonesian filmmaker

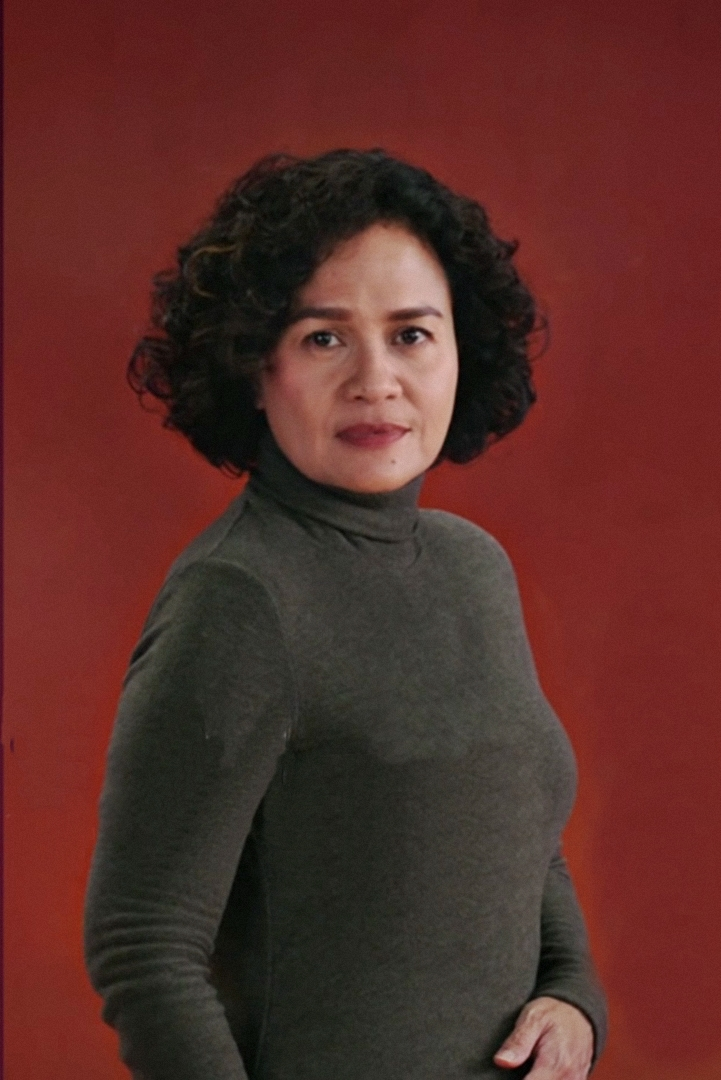
- Mira Lesmana in September 2020
- Born: Mira Lesmanawati; 8 August 1964 (age 62); Jakarta, Indonesia
- Other name: Mira Lesmana
- Education: Jakarta Institute of Arts
- Occupations: Director; Producer
- Years active: 1995 - present
- Spouse: Mathias Muchus (m. 1990)
- Parent(s): Jack Lesmana (father); Nien Lesmana (mother)
- Relatives: Indra Lesmana (younger brother); Sophia Latjuba (younger sister-in-law); Eva Celia (niece)

Mira Lesmanawati or better known as Mira Lesmana (born in Jakarta, Indonesia on 8 August 1964), is an Indonesian film director, producer, and songwriter. She is the elder sister of Indonesian jazz musician, Indra Lesmana.

== Early life ==
Lesmana was born in Jakarta to musician Jack Lesmana and his wife Nien. Her younger brother is jazz pianist Indra Lesmana. At the age of five, she entered kindergarten at Cikini School; her primary and middle school education were conducted at the same institution. As a child, Lesmana wanted to be either a scientist or a detective, and was often at the top of her class. She later recalled that seeing George Lucas' Star Wars Episode IV: A New Hope (1977) "blew [her] off [her] feet" and may have inspired her to go into filmmaking.

At the age of 16, Lesmana wrote her first song, which her brother Indra used to gain a scholarship to a music school in Australia. As Indra was still a teenager, the family moved to Australia with him in 1979. Lesmana continued her education there; although she had previously studied English in Indonesia, she found difficulty with the Australian accent. She also started watching films regularly. After her second year in Australia, Lesmana transferred from a public school to the Australian International Independence School. After her graduation, the Lesmana family returned to Indonesia. She enrolled at the Jakarta Art Institute in 1983, graduating in 1985. Her first experience with film producing was a public service announcement made at the request of Garin Nugroho.

On 14 February 1990, Lesmana married former teen idol, actor Mathias Muchus; the couple have two sons, Galih Galinggis and Kafka Keandre. Throughout the early 1990s Lesmana continued writing songs, including some for her brother and one for Chrisye's 1993 album Sendiri Lagi (Alone Again). In 1995 she established a film production company, Miles Productions, which was later renamed Miles Films. In 1996 she directed a successful documentary serial entitled Anak Seribu Pulau (Children of a Thousand Islands).

== Film career ==
In 1999 Lesmana made her feature film debut with Kuldesak, which she co-directed with Riza Mantovani, Riri Riza and Nan Triveni. The following year she produced Petualangan Sherina (Sherina's Adventure). At the time, the Indonesian film industry was in decline, and several filmmakers ridiculed the efforts, saying that the films could not be profitable; both were nevertheless successful. In 2002 Lesmana released Ada Apa dengan Cinta? (What's Up with Love?), serving as co-producer with Riza. Iwan Setiawan, writing in The Jakarta Post, describes these films as having jump-started the industry's recovery.

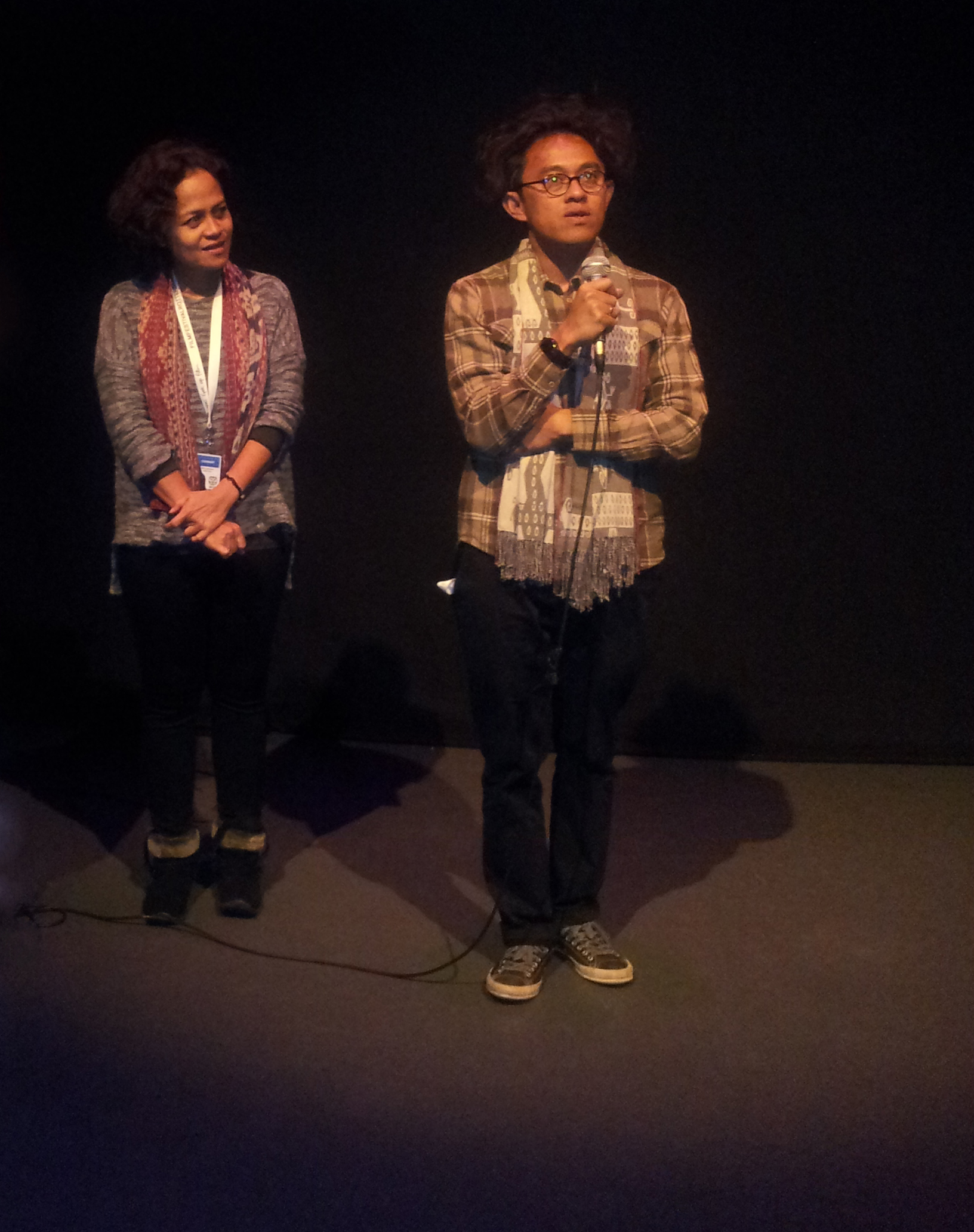
Mira Lesmana (left) with fellow director and producer Riri Riza in 2013

Lesmana produced Gie, a biopic of activist Soe Hok Gie, in 2005. Although a critical success, it did not break even. The following year, Lesmana was a founding member of the Indonesian Film Society (Masyarakat Film Indonesia), which worked to change censorship laws in the country. The group's petitions were ultimately unsuccessful. Also in 2006, she produced Garasi (Garage), a film starring Aries Budiman, Ayu Ratna, and Fedi Nuril. The cast reunited to form the band Garasi in 2007, which was one of the first acts signed to Lesmana's new recording company, Miles Music. That year, she produced 3 Hari Untuk Selamanya (3 Days for Forever); the film's soundtrack was produced by Float, another band on Miles Music.

In 2008, Lesmana produced the film Laskar Pelangi (Rainbow Troops), an adaptation of Andrea Hirata's 2007 novel of the same name. That same year she continued to pressure for new film censorship laws, which ended with the government passing a new law in 2009. The following year she produced Sang Pemimpi (The Dreamer), a sequel to Laskar Pelangi based on the novel of the same name. In 2010, Lesmana wrote twenty songs for a musical stage adaptation of Laskar Pelangi, a project that also involved Erwin Gutawa, Jay Subiyakto, and Hartandi.

Atambua 39° Celsius, a film about refugees who live in Atambua, commenced filming in 2012. The film was partially funded through crowd-funding and had its world premiere at the Tokyo International Film Festival. The following year, she released Sokola Rimba which won Best Film at the Maya Awards.

Lesmana's most expensive production as of 2017 to date was Pendekar Tongkat Emas (The Golden Cane Warrior; 2014), a martial arts film directed by Ifa Isfansyah. Starring Eva Celia, Nicholas Saputra, and Reza Rahadian, it had an estimated budget of 25 billion rupiah.

In 2016, Lesmana produced Ada Apa dengan Cinta? 2 (What's Up with Love? 2;), a sequel to Ada Apa dengan Cinta. Like its predecessor, the film was a hit with audiences, and as of June 2016 had been watched by more than 3.6 million people. Also in the same year, Lesmana released Athirah (Emma' (Mother)), a film inspired by the life of Indonesian Vice President Jusuf Kalla's mother. The film won both the Citra Award and Maya Award for Best Film and was screened at several international film festivals to positive reviews.
