= Riri Riza =

Indonesian film director, producer and writer

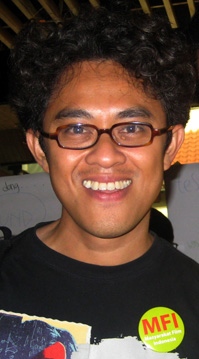
- Portrait of Riri Riza
- Born: Mohammad Rivai Riza; October 2, 1970 (age 55); Makassar, South Sulawesi, Indonesia
- Occupations: Film director; producer; screenwriter
- Notable work: Petualangan Sherina; Gie; Laskar Pelangi; Ada Apa Dengan Cinta? 2
- Children: 2

Mohammad Rivai "Riri" Riza (born October 2, 1970) is an Indonesian filmmaker. He is notable for his directorial work on Petualangan Sherina (Sherina's Adventure; 2000), Gie (2005), Laskar Pelangi (The Rainbow Troop; 2008), and Ada Apa Dengan Cinta? 2 (What's Up with Love? 2; 2016). He is also known for his creative partnership with Indonesian producer Mira Lesmana, with whom he manages the film production company, Miles Films.

== Early life and education ==
Riri Riza was born in Makassar on October 2, 1970. He moved to Jakarta in 1979, where he conducted his secondary education at LabSchool UNJ.

In 1993, Riza graduated from the Jakarta Arts Institute, where he majored in Film Directing. As a talented student, his thesis film, Sonata Kampung Bata (Sonata of the Brick Village), placed third at the 1994 Oberhausen short film festival.

== Career ==
In 1995, Riza directed two episodes in the documentary series, Anak Seribu Pulau (Children of the Thousand Islands).

He directed his first feature film, Kuldesak, in 1998, collaborating with Mira Lesmana, Nan Triveni Achnas and Rizal Mantovani. His solo feature film debut, Petualangan Sherina (Sherina's Adventure) in 2000, established him as a director.

Together with Mira Lesmana, Riza has also become a film producer. Their Ada Apa dengan Cinta? (What's Up With Love?), directed by Rudy Soedjarwo, had two million viewers in 2002, Indonesian cinema's biggest box-office draw.

Riza studied screenwriting at Royal Holloway, University of London, and then wrote his first screenplay Eliana, Eliana.

His other films include Gie, Untuk Rena (For Rena), and 3 Hari Untuk Selamanya (Three Days to Forever).

== Filmography ==
=== Films ===
Year	International title	Director	Writer	Producer	Original title
1998	Kuldesak	Yes	No	No	
2000	Sherina's Adventure	Yes	No	No	Petualangan Sherina
2002	What's Up with Love?	No	No	Yes	Ada Apa dengan Cinta?
2002	Eliana, Eliana	Yes	Yes	Yes	
2005	Dear Rena	Yes	No	Yes	Untuk Rena
2005	Gie	Yes	Yes	No	
2007	Three Days to Eternity	Yes	No	No	3 Hari untuk Selamanya
2008	The Rainbow Troops	Yes	Yes	No	Laskar Pelangi
2008	Takut: Faces of Fear (Segment: "The Incarnation of Naya")	Yes	Yes	No	Takut: Faces of Fear (Segment: "Titisan Naya")
2009	The Dreamer	Yes	Yes	No	Sang Pemimpi
2012	Atambua 39° Celsius	Yes	Yes	No	Atambua 39 Derajat Celsius
2013	The Jungle School	Yes	Yes	No	Sokola Rimba
2016	What's Up with Love? 2	Yes	No	No	Ada Apa dengan Cinta? 2
2016	Athirah	Yes	Yes	No	
2018	Run to the Beach	Yes	Yes	No	Kulari ke Pantai
2019	Humba Dreams	Yes	Yes	No	
2019	Glorious Days	Yes	No	No	Bebas
2021	Paranoia	Yes	Yes	No	
2023	Petualangan Sherina 2	Yes	Yes	No	
2025	Rangga & Cinta	Yes	No	No	

=== Short films ===
Year	English title	Director	Writer	Producer	Original title
1994	Sonata of the Brick Village	Yes	Yes	No	Sonata Kampung Bata
2008	Thou Shalt Not Wait	Yes	Yes	Yes	Tak Kau Kunanti
2008	Drupadi	Yes	No	No	Drupadi
2021	Warisan	TBA	TBA	TBA	Warisan

== Awards and nominations ==
Year	Award	Category	Recipients	Result
2004	Indonesian Film Festival	Citra Award for Best Director	Eliana, Eliana	Nominated
2005	Indonesian Film Festival	Citra Award for Best Director	Gie	Nominated
2006	MTV Indonesia Movie Awards	Best Director	Gie	Won
2014	Indonesian Film Festival	Citra Award for Best Director	Sokola Rimba	Nominated
2016	Indonesian Film Festival	Citra Award for Best Director	Athirah	Won
2019	Indonesian Film Festival	Citra Award for Best Director	Bebas (Glorious Days)	Nominated
2020	Indonesian Film Festival	Citra Award for Best Director	Humba Dreams	Nominated
