= Kuntilanak =

Mythological creature

The Kuntilanak (Indonesian name), also called Pontianak (Malay name), is a vengeful spirit in Indonesia, Malaysia and Singapore. The Kuntilanak usually takes the form of a beautiful woman but will reveal her true form of an ugly monster if necessary. The Kuntilanak is the stillborn child of Langsuir, another Southeast Asia female ghost. Alternatively, it is often described as an angry female spirit. Another form of the Kuntilanak refers to the ghost or white lady of Southeast Asian folklore.

The Kuntilanak is often depicted as a long-haired woman dressed in white. She lures in unsuspecting men to incite fear and enact revenge. Signs that a Kuntilanak is nearby include the sound of an infant crying and the smell of a decaying corpse or the plumeria flower.

== Etymology ==
Kuntilanak, or Pontianak, is often described as an astral female spirit. Another version of this figure depicts her as a woman with long, sharp fangs and fingernails. She is similar to the spirit of a woman who was unable to give birth while her stillborn child remained in her womb. This figure is primarily known to reside in the Kalimantan region, which includes the city of Pontianak.

The Pontianak can disguise herself using the appearance of a beautiful woman to lure her prey. In Malaysia, lore depicts them as "vampiric" blood-suckers that dissect through the internal organs of men. They are seen as particularly malevolent hantu who died in childbirth and predate on pregnant women and children during childbirth. There, they are also known as Hantu Langsuyar.

The Pontianak is derived from myths and folktales, some of which are particularly popular in Kalimantan (Borneo). Being one of the most famous pieces of Indonesian folklore, it inspired the name of a capital city in the Western Kalimantan region, called Pontianak. The legend of the city of Pontianak holds that the city began as an old trading station, infested with ghosts until Syarif Abdurrahman Alkadrie and his army drove them away with cannon fire. He then constructed a mosque and a palace on the site. These buildings became the city and the seat of the Pontianak Sultanate. Holiday celebrations often include firing bamboo cannons to pay tribute to the Sultan.

== Physical appearance and behavior ==
The Kuntilanak (Pontianak) is often depicted as a beautiful woman with pale skin, red eyes, and long black hair. She is often dressed in a blood-smeared white dress. The Kuntilanak is also described as changing into a more monstrous form when she captures her prey which is typically men or helpless people. The Kuntilanak can also take the form of an owl or a large white bird usually to scout or search of its victim. The sound of a quacking duck is also associated with the Kuntilanak.

Pontianak only appears under the full moon and typically announces her presence with the cries of infants or feminine laughter. It is said that if the sounds are quiet, she is nearby, but if they are loud, she is far away. Some sources also state that a dog howling at night indicates that a Pontianak is present, but not too close; if the dog whines, then a Pontianak is near. Its presence is also said to be heralded by a floral fragrance, identifiable as that of the Plumeria flower, followed by a stench similar to that of a decaying corpse.

The Pontianak kills her victims by using her long fingernails to physically remove their internal organs for consumption. In cases where the Pontianak seeks revenge against a man, she is said to eviscerate the victim with her hands. If a victim has their eyes open when a Pontianak is near, she will suck them out of their head. The Pontianak is believed to locate her prey by the scent of their clean laundry; because of this, some Malaysians refuse to leave any piece of clothing outside their homes overnight.

The Pontianak is associated with banana trees, and her spirit is said to reside in them during the day. According to folklore, a Pontianak can be fought off by driving a nail into the hole on the nape of her neck, which causes her to turn into a beautiful woman and a good wife until the nail is removed.

The Indonesian Kuntilanak is similar to the Pontianak in Malaysia, but commonly takes the form of a bird and sucks the blood of virgins and young women. The bird, which makes a "Ke-ke-ke" sound as it flies, may be sent through black magic to make a woman fall ill; the characteristic symptom being vaginal bleeding. When a man approaches her in her female form, the Kuntilanak suddenly turns and reveals that her back is hollow, much like the Sundel bolong the prostitute ghost with her large gaping hole on her back. A Kuntilanak can be subdued by plunging a sharp nail into the top of her head.

== In popular culture ==
The Kuntilanak has been portrayed in Indonesian and Malaysian horror films and on Indonesian and Malaysian television. In films, pontianaks often are shown as dark-haired women. They possess supernatural powers and may sometimes play the role of hero. A common plot device is that they may be defeated by a nail inserted into the back of their neck, though this does not kill them. Instead, they turn into normal women.

Pontianak films became popular during the 1950s and 1960s in Malaysia, after Cathay-Keris Films made a series of four films (Pontianak in 1957, Dendam Pontianak in 1957, Sumpah Pontianak in 1958 and Pontianak Gua Musang in 1964), all directed by B.N. Rao and with Maria Menado playing the Pontianak. In response, Malay Film Productions made their own series, directed by Ramon A. Estella. Many of these earlier films are now lost.

Pontianak films had mostly stopped being produced by the 1970s and, in 1990s, the Malaysian government censored horror films. These laws were relaxed in the 2000s, which brought on another wave of films, including the feminist Pontianak Harum Sundal Malam.

- Malaysian films:
  - Pontianak (1957)
  - Dendam Pontianak (English: The Pontianak's Vengeance, 1957)
  - Sumpah Pontianak (English: Curse of the Pontianak, 1958)
  - Anak Pontianak, (English: The Pontianak Child, 1958)
  - Pontianak Kembali (English: The Return of Pontianak, 1963)
  - Pontianak Gua Musang (English: Pontianak Musang Cave) (1964)
  - Pontianak (1975, directed by Roger Sutton)
  - Return to Pontianak (2001, directed by Djinn)
  - Pontianak Harum Sundal Malam (2004)
  - Perempuan, Pontianak dan Dot Dot Dot (2004)
  - Pontianak Harum Sundal Malam 2 (2005)
  - The Scream of Pontianak (2005)
  - Anak Pontianak TV Series (2007)
  - Ponti Anak Remaja (2009)
  - Ponti Anak Remaja Mini Series (2010)
  - Help! My Girlfriend Is A Pontianak (2011)
  - Pontianak vs Oily Man (2012)
  - The Nail of Pontianak (2013)
  - Misteri Bisikan Pontianak (2013)
  - Pontianak Sesat Dalam Kampung Telemovie (2016)
  - Dendam Pontianak (2019)
  - Ex Aku Pontianak, also known as My Ex Is A Pontianak (2022)
  - Pulau (2023)
- Indonesian films:
  - Kuntilanak (1962)
  - Kuntilanak (1974)
  - Lawang Sewu (2007)
  - Casablanca Tunnel (Red Kuntilanak) (2007)
  - Kuntilanak's Nest (2008)
  - Kuntilanak (2006), Kuntilanak 2 (2007), Kuntilanak 3 (2008)
  - Kuntilanak's Morgue (2009)
  - Kuntilanak Beranak (2009)
  - Nail Demon (2009)
  - Santet Kuntilanak (2012)
  - Kuntilanak (2018)
- Indonesian Video Games:
  - DreadOut (2014)
  - Pamali: Indonesian Folklore Horror (2018)
- Singaporean films:
  - Return of Pontianak, also known as Voodoo Magic (2001)
  - Dendam Pontianak, also known as Revenge of the Pontianak (2019)
- Hong Kong films:
  - The Demon's Baby (1998)
- Malaysian fiction:
  - The House of Aunts (2011) by Zen Cho
- Singaporean fiction:
  - Folklore: "Nobody"
- American fiction:
  - Supernatural: "Cold Fire"
- Internet Subculture:
  - The VTuber Mika Melatika of Nijisanji ID is described in her character lore as a kuntilanak.

== See also ==
- Churel
- Keres
- Lang Suir
- Leyak
- Madam Koi Koi
- Mavka
- Onryō
- Tai Thong Klom
- Ubume
- Yakshini, a similar figure in Hindu, Buddhist, and Jain religious mythologies
- Indonesian horror
- List of ghosts
- Malay folklore

== Bibliography ==
- Galt, Rosalind (2021). Alluring Monsters: The Pontianak and Cinemas of Decolonization. Columbia University Press. doi:10.7312/galt20132. ISBN 978-0-231-20132-2.
