= Cinta di Langit Taj Mahal =

Indonesian television series

- Genre: Drama; Romance
- Created by: Maxima Pictures
- Written by: Nucke Rahma SH
- Screenplay by: Nucke Rahma SH
- Directed by: Indrayanto Kurniawan; Sanjeev Kumar
- Starring: Nabila Syakieb; Shaheer Sheikh; Evan Sanders; Miller Khan; Yana Zein; Ravi Bhatia; Harshad Arora; Shireen Sungkar; Masayu Anastasia; Aurélie Moeremans; Hardy Hartono; Amara; Reuben Elishama; Delano Daniel; Dea Lestari; Emma Warokka; Helsi Herlinda
- Opening theme: "Cinta di Langit Taj Mahal" — Pia Fellini & Evan Sanders
- Ending theme: "Cinta di Langit Taj Mahal" — Pia Fellini & Evan Sanders
- Composer: Joseph S. Djafar
- Country of origin: Indonesia
- Original language: Indonesian
- No. of seasons: 2
- No. of episodes: 147

Production
- Camera setup: Multi-camera
- Running time: 60 minutes
- Production company: Maxima Pictures

Original release
- Network: ANTV
- Release: 8 June – 14 December 2015

Cinta di Langit Taj Mahal (transl. Love In The Sky Of The Taj Mahal) is an Indonesian television drama series produced by Maxima Pictures which ran from 8 June to 14 December 2015 on ANTV. It stars Shaheer Sheikh, Nabila Syakieb, Evan Sanders and Miller Khan.

== Series overview ==
Season	No. of episodes	Originally broadcast	
Season	No. of episodes	Series premiere	Series finale
1	122	8 June 2015	4 October 2015
2	25	9 November 2015	14 December 2015

== Plot ==
=== Season 1 ===
Reehan Syahputra sacrificed his feelings for his best friend, Aldi Haryo Kusumo. He gave up Najwa Khairunnisa to allow Aldi to marry her. Beyond their friendship, Reehan's openness and fearlessness, along with their cultural differences, led him to let Najwa marry Aldi, despite the fact that Najwa shared the same feelings for Reehan. However, a few years later, Reehan discovered that Aldi had divorced Najwa three times. Aldi then married Anita because she was pregnant. This situation was exacerbated by the manipulations of Aldi's stepsister, Dion, and his stepmother, Hilda. When the deception was revealed, Aldi felt regret and wanted Najwa back, but winning her over was not easy. He tried various methods, including seeking help from Reehan, who ultimately felt compelled to be honest about his own feelings. Complicating matters further was the emergence of a handsome young Indian man named Zain, who entered their lives.

=== Season 2 ===
Najwa gave birth to a son, who was later exchanged by her half-brother for another child who had died. Najwa's original child was discarded and then taken in by a wealthy couple, who named him Revan.

Twenty-three years later, Revan has a girlfriend named Aisyah. Aisyah is an orphan raised by Reehan. Revan and his parents have arranged a marriage for him with a woman named Airin. Revan also has a younger brother named Ravi, who recounts the accident that occurred while rescuing Airin.

Revan boards a helicopter from Bali to Jakarta. Suddenly, the private helicopter experiences technical difficulties, prompting Revan to exit and dive into the forest, where he becomes stuck in a tree. In that forest lives a beautiful woman named Cinta. Revan calls for help but falls down a waterfall, where Cinta saves him.

Revan awakens from his stupor, but suddenly, he goes blind and panics because he cannot see anything. In addition to his blindness, Revan loses his memory, and Cinta gives him the name Rangga.

Cinta takes good care of the blind Revan. Danang, feeling frustrated, becomes determined to eliminate Revan, as he is upset that Cinta is helping and caring for him.

Cinta and Rangga find themselves alone at the waterfall. Suddenly, Rangga nearly falls and kisses Cinta. They enjoy each other's company on a boat.

As Rangga and Cinta share tea together, a crowd suddenly arrives to threaten them. They demand that if Rangga does not vacate the premises, his house will be burned down. What happens next in their story?

== Cast ==
=== Main ===
- Shaheer Sheikh as Reehan Syahputra
- Nabila Syakieb as Najwa Khairunnisa / Cinta
- Evan Sanders as Aldi Haryo Kusumo
- Miller Khan as Dion
- Ravi Bhatia as Ravi
- Shireen Sungkar as Aisyah

=== Recurring ===
- Masayu Anastasia as Bella
- Aurélie Moeremans as Anita
- Inzalna Balqis as Mayang
- Yana Zein as Priyanka
- Vicky Burky as Hilda
- Reuben Elishama as Goldi
- Restu Sinaga as Kevin
- Vicky Monica as Prity
- Marissa Nasution as Syahrul
- Pierre Gruno as Razak Abdulrahman
- Lulu Kurnia as Rain
- Harshad Arora as Zain
- Robby Sugara as Mr. Corpa
- Kia Poetri as Jihan
- Tetty Liz Indriati as Hasanah
- Cheppy Chandra as Chandra: Aldi's father.
- Tiara Permata as Tiara
- Tengku Dewi Putri as Dewi: Airin's sister.
- Dea Lestari as Airin
- Hardy Hartono as Danang
- Guntur Triyoga as Yosi
- Emma Warokka as Emma: Yosi's mother.
- Ayu Pratiwi as Ayu
- Helsi Herlinda as Samsiah
- Amara as Elina
- Delano Daniel as Rizal

== Production ==
=== Casting ===
Nabila Syakieb was selected to portray Najwa Khairunnisa. Shaheer Sheikh was chosen to play the role of Reehan Syahputra. Harshad Arora to play the role of Zain. In November 2015, Shireen Sungkar join the show.

=== Filming ===
The show filmed in Indonesia and India.

== Awards and nominations ==
Year	Award	Category	Nominee	Result	Ref.
2015	Festival Film Bandung 2015	Best TV show	Cinta di Langit Taj Mahal	Nominated	
2015	Festival Film Bandung 2015	Best Actor (Male)	Evan Sanders	Nominated	
2015	Festival Film Bandung 2015	Best Actor (Female)	Nabila Syakieb	Nominated	
