= List of number-one singles of 2022 (Indonesia) =

Indonesia Songs is a record chart in Indonesia for songs, compiled by Billboard since February 2022. The chart is updated every Tuesday on Billboard's website. The chart ranks the top 25 songs weekly in Indonesia. The data for the chart are provided by MRC Data based on weekly digital downloads and online streaming.

== Chart history ==
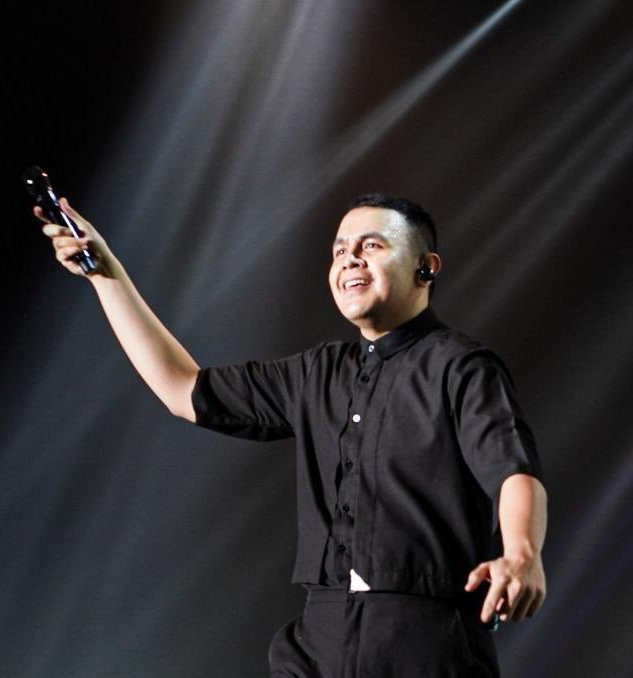
Tulus topped the Billboard Indonesia Songs charts for 12 weeks with the song "Hati-Hati di Jalan," the longest run of any song in 2022.

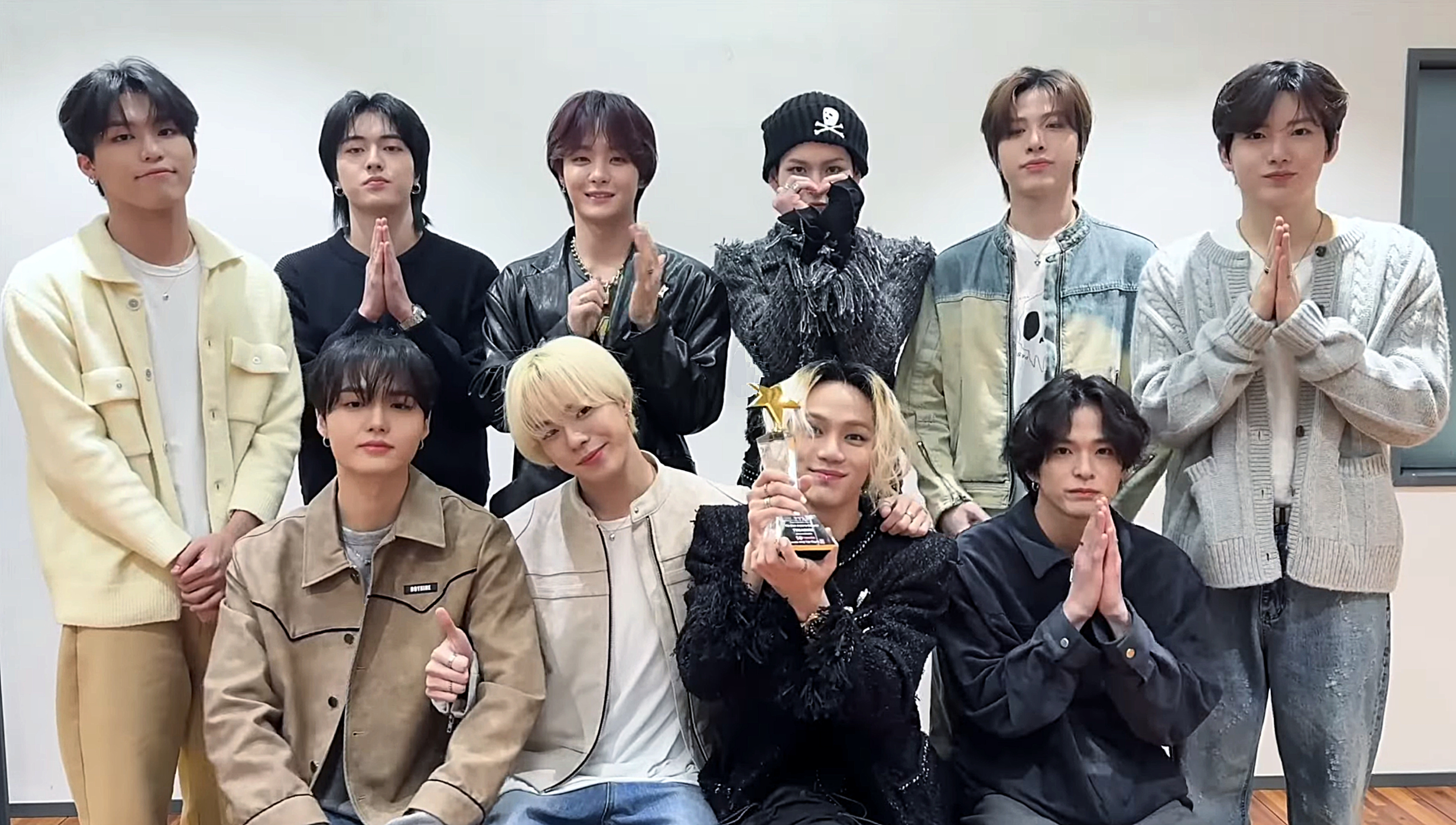
Treasure's "Jikjin" became the longest-running foreign song to hold the No. 1 spot on the Billboard Indonesia Songs chart in 2022, staying at the top for 3 weeks.

List of number-one singles
Issue date	Song	Artist(s)	Ref.
19 February	"Merasa Indah"	Tiara Andini	
26 February	"Jikjin"	Treasure	
5 March	"Jikjin"	Treasure	
12 March	"Jikjin"	Treasure	
19 March	"Hati-Hati di Jalan"	Tulus	
26 March	"Hati-Hati di Jalan"	Tulus	
2 April	"Hati-Hati di Jalan"	Tulus	
9 April	"Hati-Hati di Jalan"	Tulus	
16 April	"Hati-Hati di Jalan"	Tulus	
23 April	"Hati-Hati di Jalan"	Tulus	
30 April	"Hati-Hati di Jalan"	Tulus	
7 May	"Hati-Hati di Jalan"	Tulus	
14 May	"Hati-Hati di Jalan"	Tulus	
21 May	"Hati-Hati di Jalan"	Tulus	
28 May	"Hati-Hati di Jalan"	Tulus	
4 June	"Hati-Hati di Jalan"	Tulus	
11 June	"Tak Ingin Usai"	Keisya Levronka	
18 June	"Tak Ingin Usai"	Keisya Levronka	
25 June	"Tak Ingin Usai"	Keisya Levronka	
2 July	"Glimpse of Us"	Joji	
9 July	"Tak Ingin Usai"	Keisya Levronka	
16 July	"Tak Ingin Usai"	Keisya Levronka	
23 July	"Tak Ingin Usai"	Keisya Levronka	
30 July	"Tak Ingin Usai"	Keisya Levronka	
6 August	"Tak Ingin Usai"	Keisya Levronka	
13 August	"Tak Ingin Usai"	Keisya Levronka	
20 August	"Tak Ingin Usai"	Keisya Levronka	
27 August	"Tak Ingin Usai"	Keisya Levronka	
3 September	"Pink Venom"	Blackpink	
10 September	"Sang Dewi"	Lyodra & Andi Rianto	
17 September	"Sang Dewi"	Lyodra & Andi Rianto	
24 September	"Sang Dewi"	Lyodra & Andi Rianto	
1 October	"Shut Down"	Blackpink	
8 October	"Sang Dewi"	Lyodra & Andi Rianto	
15 October	"Sang Dewi"	Lyodra & Andi Rianto	
22 October	"Sang Dewi"	Lyodra & Andi Rianto	
29 October	"Sang Dewi"	Lyodra & Andi Rianto	
5 November	"Anti-Hero"	Taylor Swift	
12 November	"Sang Dewi"	Lyodra & Andi Rianto	
19 November	"Sang Dewi"	Lyodra & Andi Rianto	
26 November	"Sang Dewi"	Lyodra & Andi Rianto	
3 December	"Sang Dewi"	Lyodra & Andi Rianto	
10 December	"Fall in Love Alone"	Stacey Ryan	
17 December	"Kau Rumahku"	Raissa Anggiani	
24 December	"Kau Rumahku"	Raissa Anggiani	
31 December	"Kill Bill"	SZA	

=== Number-one artists ===
List of number-one artists, with total weeks spent at number one shown
Position	Artist	Weeks at No. 1
1	Tulus	12
2	Andi Rianto	11
2	Keisya Levronka	11
2	Lyodra	11
3	Treasure	3
4	Blackpink	2
4	Raissa Anggiani	2
5	Joji	1
5	Stacey Ryan	1
5	SZA	1
5	Taylor Swift	1
5	Tiara Andini	1

== See also ==
- 2022 in music
