= Alluring Monsters =

2021 non-fiction book by Rosalind Galt

Alluring Monsters: The Pontianak and Cinemas of Decolonization
- Author: Rosalind Galt
- Publisher: Columbia University Press
- Publication date: 2021

Alluring Monsters: The Pontianak and Cinemas of Decolonization is a non-fiction book by Rosalind Galt. Published in 2021 by Columbia University Press, it discusses Galt's analysis of the mythological Pontianaks in post-colonial Singapore and Malay media.

== Figure of Pontianak ==
The Pontianak (also known as Kuntilanak in Indonesia) is one of the most feared and popular female ghosts in Malay folklore across Malaysia, Singapura, and Indonesia. Traditionally, this figure is depicted as the spirit of a woman who died during childbirth or as a victim of male violence, returning as a restless soul. Often regarded as having vampire-like qualities, the Pontianak seeks vengeance against men or preys on the vulnerable, such as pregnant women and infants.

Visually, the pontianak is often depicted in two forms: as a pale-skinned, beautiful woman with long, flowing black hair wearing a white dress, or as a terrifying monster with sharp fangs, red eyes, and long claws. A distinctive physical trait is the presence of a hole at the back of her neck. Her presence is often signaled by the scent of frangipani flowers that shifts into a foul stench, as well as the sound of an infant crying or a woman’s high-pitched laughter. She is also traditionally associated with banana trees as her dwelling place.

A central aspect of the pontianak mythology is the method of her subjugation. According to belief, plunging a sharp object, usually a nail, into the hole at the nape of her neck transforms her from a fierce monster into an obedient, beautiful woman, who can then become a 'perfect' wife and mother. However, if the nail is removed, she reverts to her horrific original form and regains her supernatural powers. This dynamic is often interpreted as a symbol of patriarchal fantasy aimed at controlling female agency and perceived 'wild' sexuality.

In cinema and popular culture, the pontianak holds complex meanings. She is viewed not only as a symbol of terror but also as a representation of cultural anxieties regarding modernity, gender roles, and the tension between traditional animistic beliefs and Islamic teachings. While traditional narratives often cast her as a 'feminine monster' disrupting social order, modern and academic interpretations frequently see her as a feminist figure demanding justice for patriarchal violence. Furthermore, her close association with forests and villages makes her a relevant symbol in discourses concerning land ownership, environmental degradation, and post-colonial identity.

== General references ==
- Cortez, Iggy (2022-06-01). "Review: Alluring Monsters: The Pontianak and Cinemas of Decolonization , by Rosalind Galt". Film Quarterly. 75 (4): 89–91. doi:10.1525/fq.2022.75.4.89. ISSN 0015-1386.
- Khoo, Gaik Cheng (2023-05-01). "Alluring Monsters: The Pontianak and Cinemas of Decolonization". The Journal of Asian Studies. 82 (2): 284–286. doi:10.1215/00219118-10291003. ISSN 0021-9118.
- Neo, David H.J. (2024-01-02). "Alluring monsters: the Pontianak and cinemas of decolonization". Asian Ethnicity. 25 (1): 178–181. doi:10.1080/14631369.2023.2251134. ISSN 1463-1369.
- Tiburcio-Moreno, Erika (2022-07-03). "Alluring Monsters: The Pontianak and Cinemas of Decolonization: Rosalind Galt, 2021, New York, NY, Columbia University Press, pp. xii + 312, illus., $140.00 (cloth), $35.00 (paper)". Historical Journal of Film, Radio and Television. 42 (3): 625–626. doi:10.1080/01439685.2022.2083134. ISSN 0143-9685.
- Yusoff, Norman (2023). "Alluring Monsters: The Pontianak and Cinemas of Decolonization by Rosalind Galt (review)". Sojourn: Journal of Social Issues in Southeast Asia. 38 (1): 112–115. ISSN 1793-2858.
