= Shi Zhiyu =

Shi Zhiyu may refer to:

- Chih-yu Shih (born 1958), Taiwanese political scientist
- Domee Shi (born 1989), Chinese-born Canadian animator, director and screenwriter
