= Kuntilanak 3 =

2008 Indonesian horror film

- Directed by: Rizal Mantovani
- Written by: Ve Handojo; Rizal Mantovani
- Produced by: Raam Punjabi
- Starring: Julie Estelle; Imelda Therinne; Laura Antoinette; Mandala Shoji; Reza Pahlevi; Ida Iasha; Irene Racik Salamun; Cindy Valerie; Robby Kolbe; Laudya Cynthia Bella
- Distributed by: MVP Pictures
- Release date: 13 March 2008
- Running time: 90 minutes
- Country: Indonesia
- Language: Bahasa Indonesia

Kuntilanak 3 (English: The Chanting 3) is an Indonesian horror film directed by Rizal Mantovani. The film is the third in a trilogy, preceded by Kuntilanak and Kuntilanak 2. The film stars Julie Estelle, Imelda Therinne and Laudya Cynthia Bella. The film was released on March 13, 2008.

== Plot ==
A newly engaged couple, Stella and her fiancé Rimson, disappears while trekking through an unspoiled forest. Four members of the SAR Komodo Team—Darwin, Asti, Herman, and Petra—begin searching for them and enlist Samantha. After reaching the forest entrance and finding the path blocked, they continue deeper into the woods by climbing the surrounding hills.

At their camp, the team asks Samantha why she entered the forest, but she urges them to abandon the mission. Strange noises and supernatural phenomena soon force them onwards. Samantha finds Stella's red shawl and recalls her mother, Mega N. Widjoko, who had instructed her to visit Ujung Sedo, at the edge of the deep forest, to eliminate her wangsit concerning the Kuntilanak.

The following morning, a sudden mist disrupts their equipment. After passing through it, Samantha and the others follow Yenny, the daughter of Sam's landlord who was kidnapped by the Kuntilanak in the second film. Yenny disappears into a cave, prompting the group to enter and split into two. After a series of terrifying encounters, they escape with a warning that Samantha must seek Mbah Putri, the source of the Kuntilanak's wangsit within the Mangkoedjiwo family.

At a clearing, Samantha reveals that they have reached "Ujung Sedo". That night, the Kuntilanak haunts Herman, causing him to fall into quicksand. While searching for him the next morning, the remaining four discover a ghostly village containing a cow carcass and a crying baby. Despite warnings, Petra picks up the child. The baby disappears that night, and the Kuntilanak attacks Petra when she searches for it. Asti, Darwin, and Samantha then go looking for Petra. Samantha encounters Yenny and follows her to a field, where she sees blind children chasing a white horse.

Samantha catches up with Yenny and witnesses the Kuntilanak gathering children and sucking out their souls for sustenance. As they flee, Darwin, having seen the Kuntilanak, takes his own life after becoming enchanted by her. Samantha later reunites with Asti, who promises to help her survive, before reaching Mbah Putri's home with Yenny.

Mbah Putri reveals that the Kuntilanak is the vengeful spirit of a mother killed after giving birth to the devil's child, a fate resembling her own. Now 100 years old, Mbah Putri had agreed to carry the child in exchange for immortality. She composed the Durmo (or the Chant), sung by Samantha and the Mangkoedjiwo descendants, to summon the Kuntilanak. The spirit feeds the souls of murdered victims to the devil's spawn, allowing it to survive in Mbah Putri's womb.

Samantha realises that she cannot eliminate the wangsit while the child lives. She also learns that her encounter with Mega was an illusion created by Mbah Putri to lure her to Ujung Sedo and make her the child's replacement host. Mbah Putri sings the Durmo and releases the devil's child, which enters Samantha's womb. Samantha sends Yenny to the rescue point, then climbs to the top of a waterfall and jumps, hoping to kill herself and the child.

Asti, Yenny, and the other captives reach the rescue point, where a helicopter arrives. Meanwhile, a hand, possibly Samantha's, emerges from beneath the stones at the waterfall.

== Cast ==
- Julie Estelle as Samantha
- Imelda Therinne as Asti
- Laura Antoinette as Petra
- Mandala Shoji as Darwin
- Reza Pahlevi as Herman
- Ida Iasha as Mega N. Widjoko
- Irene Racik Salamun as Mrs. Putri
- Cindy Valerie as Yenny
- Robby Kolbe as Rimson
- Laudya Cynthia Bella as Stella

== Production ==
The film was shot in the Ciwidey, Bandung jungle.

== Reception ==
A critic from detikhot wrote that "Don't be surprised if you find various unusual things when watching Kuntilanak 3. What are they? There are cows that can give birth to baby Kuntilanak, or Kuntilanak who are breastfeeding their children in the trees. Or you could also be confused by the appearance of small children in the middle of the forest who are said to have been kidnapped by Kuntilanak".
