= Asian Ethnicity =

- Discipline: Asian studies; Anthropology, Ethnography
- Language: English
- Edited by: Ian Baird, Mathew King, Debojyoti Das

Publication details
- History: 2000-present
- Publisher: Routledge
- Frequency: Quarterly
- Impact factor: 1.6 (2022)

Standard abbreviations
- ISO 4: Asian Ethn.

Indexing
- ISSN: 1463-1369 (print); 1469-2953 (web)
- LCCN: 2011236818
- OCLC no.: 779676715

Links
- Journal homepage; Online access; Online archive

Asian Ethnicity is a quarterly peer-reviewed academic journal covering research about ethnic groups and ethnic relations in Asia. It was established in 2000 and is published by Routledge. The founding editor-in-chief was Colin Mackerras (Griffith University). He was succeeded by Chih-yu Shih (National Taiwan University), who in his turn was succeeded by Julie Yu-Wen Chen (University of Helsinki). Since February 2021, the editors-in-chief are Ian G. Baird (University of Wisconsin-Madison), Matthew W. King (University of California, Riverside), and Debojyoti Das (University of Sussex).

== Abstracting and indexing ==
The journal is abstracted and indexed in:

- CSA Worldwide Political Science Abstracts
- EBSCOhost
- Emerging Sources Citation Index
- International Bibliography of the Social Sciences
- International Political Science Abstracts
- Scopus
