= The Rooftop (film) =

- Film poster for Mainland China market
- Directed by: Jay Chou
- Written by: Jay Chou
- Produced by: Huang Zhiming; Will Liu
- Starring: Jay Chou; Eric Tsang; Xu Fan; Li Xin'ai; Alan Ko; Wang Xueqi
- Cinematography: Mark Lee Ping Bin
- Edited by: Chiang Yi-ning
- Music by: Jay Chou; Huang Yuxun
- Production companies: Chuang Yi Motion Pictures; Evergrande Entertainment; Edko Films; Beijing Talent International Media
- Distributed by: Buena Vista Distribution; Edko Films
- Release dates: 11 July 2013 (Taiwan and China); 19 July 2013 (North America); 1 August 2013 (Hong Kong)
- Running time: 120 minutes
- Country: Taiwan
- Language: Mandarin
- Box office: TWD$250,000,000

The Rooftop (Chinese: 天台; pinyin: tiān tái; lit. 'Rooftop') is a 2013 Taiwanese musical film. It is the second feature film directed by Taiwanese singer/actor Jay Chou. Similar to his first feature film, Secret, Jay played multiple roles in the production of the film, as the main lead, director, script-writer and music composer.

The Rooftop is one of the many scripts that Chou has written since the success of Secret in 2007. Most of the scripts are sequels to Secret. However, Chou and his long-time friend Will Liu decided to work on The Rooftop as a challenge to produce the first Chinese mainstream musical-cum-martial arts film. They claimed that The Rooftop is a film that is difficult to be categorized, for it combined the elements of musical extravaganza and action.

Chou has made good use of his experience from filming The Green Hornet in Hollywood, Initial D in Hong Kong and directing over 60 of his own music videos, to conceptualize The Rooftop with music as its roots, combined with action, to create a genre never seen before in Asia.

== Name ==
The film is released in Mainland China as "天台爱情" (literally "The Rooftop Love"), to avoid duplication and confusion with box-office sales with another Chinese film named "天台". However, the film poster and promotional materials remained as "天台“. The film is released in all other countries as "天台" (literally "The Rooftop").

== Plot ==
The story occurs in a fantasy world called Galilee City, that consists of two contrasting communities. One group lives on the Rooftop, where they dance and sing their days away with no worries. While those on the ground are affluent and possess more power.

In a chance encounter, Wax gets to meet his billboard dream-girl, Starling, who is an up-and-coming actress/singer. However, their blossoming love is put into test when both are involved in the fight over power on the ground.

== Cast ==
Actor	Character Name	Relationships/Descriptions
Jay Chou	Wax (浪子膏)	The film's protagonist. A romantic and reckless young man staying on the Rooftop. He has a close-knit relationship with all the residents on the Rooftop, especially Jasmine, who is like a real older sister to him, and his 3 buddies - Tempura, Egg & A-Lang. He works at Po-Ye's extravagant medical hall, but is always seen fooling around and skipping work throughout the film. He met his dream-girl, the celebrity Starling, on a chance encounter, and introduced her to the carefree lifestyle on the Rooftop. However, his involvement with Tempura's work at the City Housing Authority put their relationship into test.
Alan Ko	Tempura (黑輪)	An honest and down-to-earth chap from the Rooftop, and is 1 of Wax's 3 buddies. He is one of the few residents from the Rooftop who hold a stable job in the "world below". As a junior member in the City Housing Authority (a triad), he is in-charge of collecting rental from the street hawkers. His persistence (with Wax's help) and honesty earns him high recognition from Rango and causes Big Red's position in the triad to waver.
Li Xin'ai	Starling (心艾)	Wax's love interest. Wax's friends called her "Sister-in-law". An up-and-coming actress/singer who is forced into the entertainment industry by her debt-ridden father. She met Wax and his buddies and they became good friends without her father and William knowing. Upon visits to the Rooftop and Lovers' Lake Night Market, she was begrudge of their carefree lives and wishes to live her own life and to seek her own happiness too. However, misunderstandings raised, causing her to mistrust Wax's intention to get close to her.
Darren Chiu	William (方旭威/威少)	A handsome and wealthy celebrity who has strings attached with the Mayor. He has utmost control over the movie that he is filming, as well as his female co-star, Starling.
Wang Xueqi	Rango (雷哥)	The leader of the City Housing Authority (a triad) with a group of underlings in-charge of collecting rental from the town's merchants. His authority over the town makes him even more influential than the local Mayor.
Edison Huang	Big Red (紅毛)	Hot-temper and arrogant. Rango's most steadfast underling who tops the ranks every year in the amount of rental collected. However, Rango discovered through Tempura of his dishonesty and stripped him of his duties in the triad.
Xu Fan	Jasmine (茉莉姊)	Older sister figure staying on the Rooftop.
Win Wu YanHong	Rome (羅門)	Rango's Subordinate and also one of Big Red's men. They caused trouble at the night market but were opposed by Langzi Gao's gang

== Supporting cast ==
- Kenny Bee as Lao Lee (老李), Starling's debt-ridden father
- Eric Tsang as Po-Ye (波爺), owner of Po-Ye Medical Hall
- Na-Dou as Dou-hua (豆花), Po-Ye's son
- A-Ken as Pa-pa Zhao (爬爬趙), owner of the bowling alley
- Tang Chong Sheng as Gen Pi Cong (跟屁從), owner of the apparel & goldfish stalls at Lovers' Lake Night Market
- A-Lang as A-Lang (阿郎) or named Broccoli, Wax's buddy, resident of the Rooftop
- Devon Song as Egg (蛋花), Wax's buddy, resident of the Rooftop
- Win Wu YanHong, Rome, Rango's subordinate

== Cameo (uncredited) ==
- Zhan Yuhao, at the bowling alley
- Chase Chang, in the recording studio
- Andrew Lau, the Mayor of Galilee City
- Will Liu, Boss Li, nightclub owner
- Soda Voyu, film director
- Gary Yang, Rango's assistant
- Kevin Lin, reporter
- Huang Yu Xun, peddler at Lovers' Lake Night Market
- Zhu Degang, William's assistant
- Vivi Wang Wan Fei, lady on the road
- David Chiang, older Wax
- Fu Yi Wei, older Starling

== Production ==
The film was shot on location in Taiwan, Beijing and Shanghai.

== Achievements ==
The film was named as New York Asian Film Festival Closing Night Selection.
