= Leo di Februari =

2025 Indonesian television series

- Genre: Drama; Romance
- Directed by: Asep Kusdinar
- Starring: Ranty Maria; Rayn Wijaya; Cinta Brian; Vonny Felicia; Irsyadillah; Victor Agustino; Jinan Safa; Jonathan Alden; Fadlan Holao; Joe P Project; Marcelino Lefrandt; TJ Ruth; Alvin Adam; Lorenzo Gibbs; Vidya Ully; Masayu Anastasia
- Country of origin: Indonesia
- Original language: Indonesian
- No. of seasons: 1
- No. of episodes: 7

Production
- Camera setup: Multi-camera
- Running time: 40 minutes
- Production companies: Unlimited Production; Maxima Pictures

Original release
- Network: WeTV
- Release: 23 May – 5 July 2025

Leo di Februari (English: Leo in February) is an Indonesian romantic television series produced by Unlimited Production which premiered on 23 May 2025 on WeTV. It starring Ranty Maria, Rayn Wijaya, and Cinta Brian.

== Plot ==
February, or familiarly called Feby. Coming from a lower-middle-class family, Feby faces pressure from her old-fashioned parents.

They really want Feby to marry a rich man to improve the family's financial condition.

Luck is on Feby's side when her brother manages to get her a job at Sang Daksa, a well-known consulting firm in Jakarta.

She, who graduated from a small campus, is determined to falsify her diploma to enter the reputable company.

With the spirit of making her parents happy, Feby decides to make the most of this opportunity. She is determined to attract the attention of the rich man she meets in the workplace.

At work, Feby meets Leo, a young executive who is known to be cold, a perfectionist, and difficult to approach.

Unlike the expressive Feby, Leo prioritizes work over his emotions or personal life.

Their meeting triggers a hilarious dynamic, where the coquettish and enthusiastic Feby often clashes with Leo's rigid attitude.

However, behind their differences, the seeds of romance begin to grow, bringing Feby to a dilemma: follow her parents' wishes to marry a rich man or follow her own heart.

== Cast ==
- Ranty Maria sebagai Februari Putri Ayu a.k.a. Febby
- Rayn Wijaya as Leo
- Cinta Brian as Raka
- Vonny Felicia as Astra
- Irsyadillah as Fatureza Ardiansyah a.k.a. Fatur
- Victor Agustino as Janu
- Jinan Safa as Helen
- Jonathan Alden as Adam
- Fadlan Holao as Ari
- Ben Sumadiwiria as Bobby Saputra
- Joe P Project as Benny
- William Saputra as Bobby's father
- Marcelino Lefrandt as Anggoro
- TJ Ruth as Lena
- Alvin Adam as Andre
- Vollan Humongio as Anton
- Lorenzo Gibbs as Biru
- Vidya Ully as Santi
- Masayu Anastasia as Mama Leo

== Production ==
=== Development ===
In August 2024, WeTV announced a new series titled Leo di Februari.

=== Casting ===
Ranty Maria was chosen to play female lead of Febby. Rayn Wijaya to play the lead male of Leo and for this series he lost 13 kilograms for fit role. Cinta Brian was cast as Raka. Vonny Felicia were cast as Astra.
