= Julie Chen (disambiguation) =

Julie Chen Moonves (born 1970), is an American television news anchor and reality television host

Julie Chen may also refer to:

- Julie Chen (academic), American academic administrator
- Julie Chen (book artist) (born 1963), American book artist
- Julie Wertz Chen, American aerospace engineer
- Julie Yu-Wen Chen, Taiwanese political scientist
