= Respati =

2024 horror film

- Theatrical release poster
- Directed by: Sidharta Tata
- Screenplay by: Sidharta Tata; Ambaridzki Ramadhantyo
- Produced by: Shanty Harmayn; Aoura Lovenson Chandra; Tanya Yuson
- Starring: Devano Danendra; Keisya Levronka; Mikha Hernan; Budi Ros; Fajar Nugra; Ratu Felisha
- Cinematography: Bagoes Tresna Adji
- Edited by: Akhmad Fesdi Anggoro
- Music by: Ofel Obaja
- Production company: BASE Entertainment
- Release date: 22 May 2024
- Running time: 108 minutes
- Country: Indonesia
- Language: Indonesian

Respati (Indonesian: Malam Pencabut Nyawa) is a 2024 fantasy thriller horror film directed by Sidharta Tata from a screenplay he wrote with Ambaridzki Ramadhantyo, based on the novel by Ragiel JP. The film stars Devano Danendra, Keisya Levronka, Mikha Hernan, Budi Ros, Fajar Nugra, and Ratu Felisha. The film was released in Indonesian theatres on 22 May 2024.

== Premise ==
A teenager who can enter dreams sees a dark spirit killing people in their sleep, and soon discovers that these dreams are linked to real-life mysterious deaths.

== Cast ==
- Devano Danendra as Respati
- Keisya Levronka as Wulan
- Mikha Hernan as Tirta
- Budi Ros as Sugiman
- Fajar Nugra as Abdul
- Ratu Felisha as Sukma

== Production ==
In December 2023, it was announced that BASE Entertainment had optioned the novel, along with the cast announcement. It was announced to release in 2024.

== Release ==
Respati was released in Indonesian theatres on 22 May 2024. It garnered 400,414 admissions during its theatrical run. It was released theatrically in Russia and Commonwealth of Independent States on 11 July 2024, grossed $600,847. It was released in Vietnamese theatres on 9 August 2024, grossed $116,268.

The film was screened in various film festivals. It was screened at the 28th Bucheon International Fantastic Film Festival, competing for Bucheon Choice. It was also screened at the 2024 Fantastic Fest and 57th Sitges Film Festival.

== Accolades ==
Award / Film Festival	Date of ceremony	Category	Recipient(s)	Result	Ref.
Bucheon International Fantastic Film Festival	4–14 July 2024	Bucheon Choice – Features	Respati	Nominated	
Indonesian Film Festival	20 November 2024	Best Visual Effects	Edbert Joshua Angga	Nominated	
