= Four Seasons (Indonesian band) =

Indonesian band

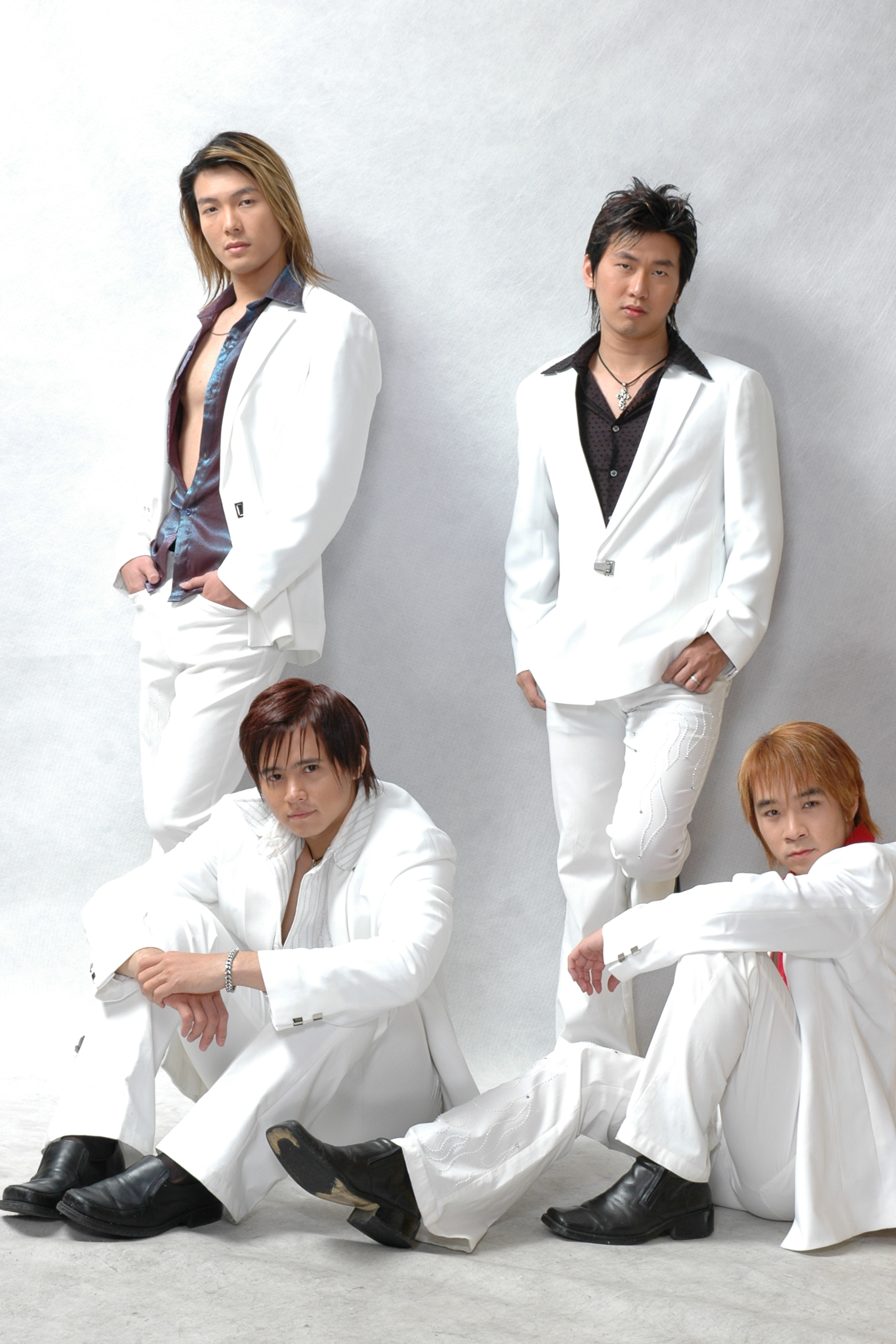

Background information
- Origin: Indonesia
- Genres: Mandopop; pop
- Instrument: Vocal
- Years active: 2002-2009
- Labels: Universal Music Indonesia

Four Seasons was Indonesia's first Mandarin-language boyband. It debuted in 2002 following the wave of Mandopop craze in early 2000 brought about by popular Taiwanese boyband F4.

Although referred to as a boyband, in contrast to common boyband and pop-band practices, members of Four Seasons categorically composed their own songs. In the album Tian Zi (天子) the members composed and wrote lyrics for 8 out 10 tracks recorded. Four Seasons was signed under Universal Music Indonesia from 2007 to 2009.

== Members ==
Members of Four Seasons donned seasons as their stage names: Spring, Summer, Autumn, and Winter.

Stage Name	Common name	Also Known As
Spring	Franco Yao	姚集松
Summer	Hendrik Lee	李俊
Autumn	Joseph Zen	曾治理,
Winter	Win Wu YanHong	吳彥宏

== Discography ==
List of tracks in Tian Zi (天子) Album

No.	Title	Original Singer	Remarks
1	天子 Children of Heaven		Music & Lyrics by Four Seasons
2	想说声对不起 Wanna Say Sorry		Music & Lyrics by Four Seasons
3	找回真爱 Quest of True Love		Music & Lyrics by Four Seasons
4	Good Bye My Love	Teresa Teng	
5	四季之爱 Four Seasons of Love		Music & Lyrics by Four Seasons
6	Happy Birthday		Music & Lyrics by Four Seasons
7	Angel		Music & Lyrics by Four Seasons
8	我不怕 Fearless		Music & Lyrics by Four Seasons
9	最美丽的回忆 The Most Beautiful Memory	Samsons	Lyrics translations by 吳佳展
10	四季之爱（快）Four Seasons of Love (alternate version)		Music & Lyrics by Four Seasons
