= Ratu Felisha =

Indonesian actor

- Born: Ratu Felisha Renatya; 16 October 1982 (age 43); Jakarta, Indonesia
- Other name: Feli
- Education: Faculty of Communication, Prof. Dr. Moestopo University
- Occupations: Actress; model
- Years active: 2003-present
- Spouses: Jules Korsten (m. 2008; div. 2012) Ari Pujianto (m. 2016; div. 2020)

Ratu Felisha Renatya (born October 16, 1982) better known as Ratu Felisha or Feli is an Indonesian model and actress, known for The Chanting (2006), Something in the Way (2013), and Badoet (2015).

== Early life ==
Ratu Felisha Renatya was born on October 16, 1982, in Jakarta, Indonesia, as the only child from Bantenese parents, Tubagus Ari Yasin and Freya Rekardini.

== Personal life ==
Since 2006, Felisha has adopted a child, Dasha Godiva, whom she has considered her own daughter. Felisha married Franciscus Emmanuel bin Korsten George aka Jules Korsten on December 24, 2008. But they finally decided to divorce in January 2012. After divorcing Jules Korsten, Felisha moved to Bali. Felisha met a lawyer named Ari Pujianto on April 30, 2015, they got engaged and then married on May 1, 2016, at Pondok Indah Mosque, South Jakarta. The couple then decided to follow the In vitro fertilization program but failed. They were divorced on November 26, 2020.

== Career ==
Feli, as she is fondly called, started her career in the entertainment world as a model. The sexy poses of Felisha once adorned the adult magazine FHM. Then she starred in her first soap opera (TV series) Gerhana. The other soap operas she has starred in include Si Cecep, Inayah, Putri yang Terbuang and others.

In 2004, Felisha entered the film industry for the first time as she starred in Buruan Cium Gue (Hurry Kiss Me). This film had become a controversy because it was considered to have bad influence on young people. Buruan Cium Gue film was widely discussed among people after Abdullah Gymnastiar (Aa Gym, Indonesian Islamic scholars) with the board of Indonesian Ulema Council and a number of artists came to the Office of Lembaga Sensor Film (LSF, Film Censorship Institution) on Thursday, August 19, 2004. Aa Gym asked LSF to suspend the movie Buruan Cium Gue across Indonesia.

In 2006, together with Julie Estelle and Evan Sanders, Felisha played as an antagonist figure in the horror film titled Kuntilanak (the Chanting) directed by Rizal Mantovani with Raam Punjabi as the producer. This film successfully brought her name to be noticed in the Entertainment industry of Indonesia.

== Filmography ==
=== Film ===
Year	Title	Role
2004	Sweet 17	Susan
2004	Buruan Cium Gue	Gladys
2005	Satu Kecupan	Gladys
2006	Kuntilanak	Dinda
2008	Cintaku Selamanya	Manda
2008	Skandal Cinta Babi Ngepet	Putri
2008	Hantu Perawan Jeruk Purut	Wanda
2010	Nakalnya Anak Muda	Renata
2010	Kain Kafan Perawan	Felisha
2012	Cinta tapi Beda	Mitha
2013	Something in the Way	Kinar/Santi
2015	Badoet	Raisa
2016	Midnight Show	Sarah
2021	Vengeance Is Mine, All Others Pay Cash	Jelita
2022	Satan's Slaves 2: Communion	Tari Daryati
2024	Respati	Sukma
