= Kuntilanak (2006 film) =

- Directed by: Rizal Mantovani
- Written by: Ve Handojo; Rizal Mantovani
- Produced by: Raam Punjabi
- Starring: Julie Estelle; Evan Sanders; Ratu Felisha
- Music by: Andi Rianto
- Distributed by: MVP Pictures
- Release date: 27 October 2006
- Running time: 95 minutes
- Country: Indonesia
- Language: Indonesian

Kuntilanak (English title: "The Chanting") (Note: although this is not a direct translation as Kuntilanak or Pontianak.) is a 2006 Indonesian horror film directed by Rizal Mantovani, about a ghost type in Indonesian (and wider Malay) folklore. In this movie, a student whose step-father molested her moves to a boarding house in a haunted area, this is followed by a series of killings.

== Plot ==
Samantha "Sam" is an orphaned young woman who moves to an isolated boarding house in North Jakarta to escape the advances of her pervert stepfather. The landlady, Yanti, tells her that the house was once a batik factory belonging to the Mangkoedjiwo family. Its current leader, Raden Ayu Sri Sukmarahimi Mangkoedjiwo, has lent the house on the condition that its second floor remains locked and off-limits. Among other restrictions, Yanti warns Sam about a chair in front of a Javanese mirror in her room. She also chants durmo, a Javanese poem believed to summon Kuntilanak, a female ghost with the lower body of a horse said to inhabit a weeping fig outside the house.

Sam tells her boyfriend, Agung, about recurring nightmares of a woman in flames accompanied by a Kuntilanak. Agung learns from his eccentric friend, Iwank, and his mother that the Mangkoedjiwo family is rumoured to be a black magic sect that maintains a Kuntilanak, which can only be summoned through antique objects. At the house, Sam befriends Dinda, who reveals that three other mirrors identical to Sam's exist, including those in her and Ratih's rooms.

Sam eventually breaks the rule concerning the mirror and glimpses a Kuntilanak. Her neighbour Mawar, who is with her boyfriend despite males being forbidden on the third floor, threatens Sam. Sam suddenly enters a trance and chants durmo, vomiting maggots and developing a strange scar, while Mawar suffers a nosebleed. Later, Mawar is killed at a motel when an electric fan falls on her neck. The following night, Sam tries to look into the second floor but is harassed by another neighbour, Alfon. She again enters a trance and chants durmo. Terrified by apparitions, Alfon flees and dies in a car accident.

Sri Sukma then visits the house. Yanti apologises for introducing Sam to durmo, but Sri Sukma insists that it is Sam's destiny to inherit it. While reading a book about the Mangkoedjiwo factory at Iwank's house, Sam sees the phrase Sing kuat sing melihara ("the strong one is the one who masters Kuntilanak"). During an argument with Agung, Sam chants durmo; the next day, she discovers that he has disappeared and hears his cries from the second floor. She discusses his disappearance with Dinda but mistakes Dinda's attempt to comfort her for romantic interest in Agung. After Sam chants durmo, Dinda leaves to shower and is killed by the Kuntilanak.

Desperate, Sam breaks into the second floor and finds Agung bleeding beside the fourth mirror, which Dinda had failed to mention. Sri Sukma explains that the Mangkoedjiwo heirs maintain a Kuntilanak summoned by a wangsit (a supernatural mandate), but, being unable to bear children, she has chosen Sam as its next carrier. When Sam refuses, Sri Sukma chants durmo to summon the Kuntilanak. Sam counters with her own durmo and overpowers her when Sri Sukma suffers a nosebleed. Sri Sukma pleads with Sam not to kill her and reveals that the Kuntilanak can be stopped by destroying its entrances into the living world: the mirrors.

Sam breaks the mirrors in her, Dinda's and Ratih's rooms, but delays destroying the second-floor mirror, allowing the Kuntilanak to kill Sri Sukma. Two ghost children attempt to take Sam away, but she escapes and is cornered by the Kuntilanak. She repeatedly chants Sing kuat sing melihara until the Kuntilanak obeys and returns to the mirror. The next day, Sam chooses to keep the mirror so she can use the Kuntilanak for her own purposes, disturbing Agung. She happily chants durmo as Kuntilanak apparitions emerge from the mirror.

== Cast ==
- Julie Estelle as Samantha
- Evan Sanders as Agung
- Ratu Felisha as Dinda
- Alice Iskak as R.Ay, Sri Sukmarahimi Mangkoedjiwo
- Lita Soewardi as Yanti
- Ibnu Jamil as Iwank

== Production ==
Julie Estelle sang an old Javanese song for summoning a Kuntilanak in the film.

== Home media ==
The film received a DVD release in 2007.

== Sequels ==
The film is followed by two more sequels, Kuntilanak 2 and Kuntilanak 3, setting up a trilogy with Mantovani returning as director. Estelle reprised her role as the main protagonist for both films, while Sanders, Soewardi, Jamil, and Iskak only return for the first sequel. Bella Esperance, Cindy Valerie, Ida Iasha, and Piet Pagau additionally starred in Kuntilanak 2, which was released on 2007 and follows Sam as she struggles to maintain her sanity due to the wangsit of Kuntilanak while being hunted by remnants of the Mangkoedjiwo sect. The final film, Kuntilanak 3, was released on 2008 and starred Laudya Cynthia Bella, Imelda Therinne, Mandala Shoji, and Reza Pahlevi in addition to Estelle, Valerie, and Iasha. It follows Sam accompanied by a rescue group in tracking the origins of the wangsit of Kuntilanak on a remote forest highlands, hoping to destroy it once and for all.

A remake was released in 2018. Kuntilanak 2, a sequel of the remake, was released on June 4, 2019, with, again, a third installment Kuntilanak 3 (2022).
