= Legend of Ban Shu =

- Promotional image
- Also known as: Ban Shu Legend
- Genre: Historical fiction Political; Romance
- Written by: Zhang Wei
- Directed by: Xu Huikang; Zhu Ruibin; Huang Weiming
- Starring: Jing Tian; Zhang Zhehan; Fu Xinbo; Li Sheng; Li Jiahang; Li Xinai; Deng Sha
- Opening theme: Jing Gong (惊鸿; Graceful) by Zhang Zhehan
- Ending theme: Xin Shang Ren (心上人; Beloved) by Jing Tian
- Country of origin: China
- Original language: Mandarin
- No. of episodes: 42

Production
- Producer: Yu Zheng
- Running time: 45 mins
- Production companies: Huanyu Film; Dongyang Xingrui

Original release
- Network: CCTV
- Release: October 6, 2015

Related
- Legend of Lu Zhen

Legend of Ban Shu (Chinese: 班淑传奇; pinyin: Ban Shu Chuan Qi) is a 2015 Chinese television series starring Jing Tian in the title role of Ban Shu, alongside Zhang Zhehan, Fu Xinbo, Li Jiahang, Li Xinai and Deng Sha. It was produced by Yu Zheng, as a counterpart to his 2013 television series Legend of Lu Zhen. The series first premiered on Sichuan terrestrial channel in China on October 6, 2015; and was later broadcast nationwide on CCTV on February 6, 2016.

The drama received positive reviews.

== Synopsis ==
Ban Shu is a girl who grew up in the western frontier. She travels to the Han capital to meet her father, but he dies before they can be reunited and his family does not approve of her due to her background. In order to be accepted by her father's family, she enters the palace to learn proper etiquette and is hired to be an imperial scholar. Her lack of understanding of Chinese culture causes a stream of comedic disruptions in class, but at the same time her outgoing and unconventional ways brighten up the dull atmosphere of the academy. At the palace she meets and falls in love with fellow professor Wei Ying, who is still grieving for his ex-fiancee. Her vivaciousness and bright personality slowly touches him and allows him to forget about his past love.

== Cast ==
=== Main ===
- Jing Tian as Ban Shu
  - Daughter of Ban Chao and princess of Shanshan County. A free-spirited girl who grew up in the grasslands. She later enters the palace and becomes a scholar to prove her identity as Ban Chao's daughter.
- Zhang Zhehan as Wei Ying
  - Descendant of military general Wei Qing. A cold and distant man. Because of the accident of his previous fiancee Liu Xuan, he grew to dislike outlanders. He used to be a capable general, but due to an accident, decides to become a scholar in the palace's academy.
- Fu Xinbo as Huo Heng/Huo Xuan
  - Huo Heng is the commander of the Eastern Han's imperial army. An intelligent and courageous man. He loves Yao Juan, and would sacrifice anything for her. Huo Xuan is Huo Heng's twin brother. A cunning and crafty man. He loves Deng Sui.
- Li Jiahang as Deng Zhi
  - Brother of Deng Sui. Great General Cheqi. Kou Lanzhi's fiancee. He used to love Ban Shu and Yue Jin.
- Li Xinai as Kou Lanzhi
  - Daughter of Marquis Fulu. Known as the most talented girl in the capital. She later becomes a scholar in the palace academy, and becomes rivals with Ban Shu.
- Deng Sha as Yao Juan
  - Ban Zhao's renowned disciple. A scholar in the palace academy. She loves Huo Heng, and is a close friend of Ban Shu. She has extremely poor eyesight.

=== Supporting ===
==== Palace academy ====
- Tien Niu as Ban Zhao
  - A renowned historian and scholar. Ban Shu's aunt, Deng Sui's teacher.
- Zhang Xinyu as Liu Xuan (Mo Chou)
  - Ban Zhao's senior disciple, and the top female professor in the inner palace academy. She used to be Wei Ying's lover, but was sent to the Southern Lands due to a marriage arrangement with King Zuoxian.
- Zhang Yijie as Liu Hong
  - Son of Prince Zhongshan. Student of Professor Wei.
- Zhang Xueying as Liu Yan
  - Princess Beixiang. Daughter of Prince Zhongshan. An unruly and spoilt girl who likes Wei Ying, and treats Ban Shu as a rival.
- Guan Xiaotong as Jiang Xiu
  - Elder mistress of Lanling Order's Jiang manor.
- Jiang Yiyi as Jiang Ling
  - Second mistress of Lanling Order's Jiang manor.
- Kang Ning as Liu Xing
  - Princess Wenxi. A girl with weak health but a kind heart.
- Merxat as Kou Feng
  - Brother of Kou Lanzhi. He likes An Xin, and dislikes Ban Shu due to her rivalry with his sister.
- Sun Yi as Ah Cen
  - Daughter of Grand Herald Lin. Kou Lanzhi's most favored student.
- Fan Linlin as He Hui
  - Daughter of the provincial governor.
- Zheng Danlei as Ah Xiang
  - Liu Yan's close friend.
- Gao Yu'er as Ah Shuang
- Gao Jicai as Zhu Ding
  - Son of Glorious Grand Master Zhu Mingtang.
- Chen Long as Li Yong
  - Son of Guannei Marquis Li Guang.
- Xiao Yuyu as Xia Wenji
  - Daughter of the Education Minister. A female professor who entered the Academy at the same time as Ban Shu, but was scared away by the rowdy students.

==== Imperial family ====
- Li Sheng as Deng Sui
  - Empress Dowager Deng. She has a forbidden love with Huo Xuan.
- Wang Peidong as Liu Hu
  - Emperor An.
- Wang Jialin as Liu Wu
  - Prince Liang. He aims to overthrow Deng Sui.
- Xiang Yicheng as Princess Yunxiu

==== Servants ====
- Wang Shuang as Court Lady Ming
  - Personal attendant of Deng Sui.
- Shao Min as Wang Sheng
  - Wet nurse of the Emperor. She often encourages the Emperor to go against Deng Sui. She treats Kou Lanzhi as a younger sister.
- Kent Tong as Uncle Zhong
  - Loyal servant of Ban family.
- Wen Wen as Pei Huan
  - Personal attendant of Ban Shu.
- Cao Xinyue as Bi Yu
  - Personal attendant of Kou Lanzhi.
- Zeng Yixuan as Jin Shu
  - Attendant of the inner academy hall.

==== Court officials ====
- Lu Yong as Yang Zhen
  - Minister of Eastern Han.
- Wang Jianxin as Marquis Kou
  - Fulu Marquis. A renowned scholar. Kou Lanzhi and Kou Feng's father. He is in cahoots with Prince Liang, and aims to overthrow Deng Sui.
- Qiu Xinzhi as Zhu Mingtang
  - Glorious grand master. Zhu Ding's father.
- Yang Long as Qin Huai
  - Deng Zhi's subordinate.
- Zhang Jia as Ban Yong
  - Sima General. Ban Shu's brother.
- Zhuo Fan as Jiang Chongdong
  - Investigating Censor of Lan Tai. Jiang Xiu and Jiang Ling's father.
- Hu Pu as Bai Chengen
  - A general.
- Yue Dongfeng as Minister Cai
  - In charge of the purchasing orders of the palace.
- Wang Maolei as Zhen Jian
  - A general. Princess Yunxiu's husband.
- Ya Jiahui as Du Zhong
  - Minister of Ye Ting Order.

==== People of Han kingdom ====
- Hei Zi as Lord Nanyang
- Wang Lin as Lady Nanyang
- Jiao Junyan as Ah Yue
  - Courtesan of Hongxiang Court. Deng Zhi's close confidant.
- Johnny Zhang as Song Cheng
  - Military captain of Xiliu Camp. Jiang Xiu's lover.
- Zang Hongna as Yin Xiu
  - A girl who likes Huo Heng.
- Kristy Yang as Zhu Ding's mother.
- He Yanni as Miao Rouniang
  - Zhu Mintang's second wife.

==== Others ====
- Gao Yunxiang as Su Li
  - Leader of the Inner Mongolias' Bandits. He likes Ban Shu.
- Zhang Meng as Yue Jin
  - A songstress who came from the Northern Lands. Deng Zhi's crush.
- Kang Lei as An Ping
  - Prince of Loulan Kingdom.
- Dilraba Dilmurat as An Xin
  - Princess of Loulan Kingdom. She likes Kou Feng.
- Ji Chen as Mo Dong
  - A businessman from the Northern Lands.
- Gao Weiguang as King Zuoxian
  - Ruler of Inner Mongolias' Southern Lands. Liu Xuan's husband.
- Li Yilin as Prince of South
  - Leader of Inner Mongolias' Southern Lands. Brother of King Zuoxian.
- Zhang Yameng as Consort Dowager
  - Mother of King Zuoxian.
- Kun Enpan as Ah Zhu
  - Personal attendant of King Zuoxian.

== Soundtrack ==
The soundtrack was released on October 10, 2015.

No.	Title	Singer	Length
1.	"Alarmed Goose (惊鸿)"	Zhang Zhehan	4:15
2.	"Sweetheart (心上人)"	Jing Tian	4:26

== Ratings ==
- Highest ratings are marked in red, lowest ratings are marked in blue

CCTV-8 Ratings
Air date	Episode	Ratings	Audience Share	Timeslot ranking
2016.2.8	1-4	0.389	1.24	10
2016.2.9	5-8	0.463	1.63	11
2016.2.10	9-12	0.431	1.49	13
2016.2.11	13-16	0.420	1.27	11
2016.2.12	17-20	0.499	1.43	7
2016.2.13	21-24	0.564	1.49	11
2016.2.14	25-28	0.689	2.09	9
2016.2.15	29-32	0.633	1.94	11
2016.2.16	33-36	0.698	2.17	10
2016.2.17	37-40	0.744	2.28	9
2016.2.18	41-42	0.694	1.82	10
