= Nabila Syakieb =

Indonesian actress (born 1985)

- Born: November 18, 1985 (age 40); Bogor, West Java, Indonesia
- Occupations: Celebrity, Model
- Years active: 1999 - present
- Spouse: Reshwara Argya Ardinal (m. 2015)
- Children: 2

Nabila Syakieb (born November 18, 1985) is an Indonesian actress and model. Her modeling career began in 1999 when she became a finalist in the Indonesian teen beauty pageant Gadis Sampul. Her breakthrough role came as the lead actress in romantic drama series Cinta SMU (2001). She won an award at the 2016 Festival Film Bandung for best actress for her role in Surga Yang Kedua.

== Career ==
Nabila Syakieb made her acting debut when she was 16 years old in a romantic drama series Cinta SMU (2001). In 2005, she starred in Anakku Bukan Anakku with Roger Danuarta and in Aku Bukan Untukmu (2005) as Ella opposite Bertrand Antolin. She performed in the drama series Anugerah (2011) produced by SinemArt. After performing in many television drama series and commercials, she took a break from acting and focused on equestrianism. Later in 2013, she won a medal for the dressage category in an Indonesian national equestrian championships AE Kawilarang Memorial Cup In 2015, she served as the lead role in Cinta di Langit Taj Mahal (2015) produced by Maxima Pictures opposite Shaheer Sheikh and Evan Sanders.

== Personal life ==
Nabila Syakieb married equestrian athlete Reshwara Argya Ardinal on December 20, 2015, in Jakarta. She gave birth to Raqeema Ruby Radinal in 2018. Her son Rasheed Ravindra Radinal was born on 2019.

== Television ==
- Cinta SMU (2001) as Putri Regina Prayoga
- Pilihlah Aku (2004) as Nayla
- Anakku Bukan Anakku (2005) as Tatia
- Aku Bukan Untukmu (2005) as Ella
- Taqwa (2006) as Desi
- Maha Kasih (2006) Eps : Cinta Dalam Sepiring Kangkung
- Darling (2007) as Darling
- Jodoh Romantis (2007) as Nayla
- Maha Cinta (2007)
- Ratu (2007) as Ratu
- Kasih (2007) as Kasih
- Sinema Romantis (2008) episode Pembantu Super Tajir
- Yasmin (2008) as Yasmin
- Cinta dan Anugerah (2009) as Nabila Fatharani
- Mertua dan Menantu (2010) as Aisyah
- Anugerah (2011) as Nabila Dharmawan
- ISkul Musikal (2012) as herself (cameo)
- Detak Cinta (2014) as Saskia
- Cinta di Langit Taj Mahal (2015) as Najwa
- Surga Yang Ke 2 (2016) as Sabrina

== Music video appearances ==
- Sinar - Piknik
- Uiuaa - Kiki
- Sebuah Rahasia - KLa Project
- Kupersembahkan - Nirwana Element
- Hip-hip Hura - Ruben Onsu
