= Something in the Way (film) =

2013 film by Teddy Soeriaatmadja

- Film poster
- Directed by: Teddy Soeriaatmadja
- Written by: Teddy Soeriaatmadja
- Produced by: Teddy Soeriaatmadja; Indra Tamorron Musu
- Starring: Reza Rahadian; Ratu Felisha
- Cinematography: Ical Tanjung
- Edited by: Eric Primasetio
- Music by: Bobby Surjadi
- Production company: Karuna Pictures
- Release date: 8 February 2013 (Berlin)
- Running time: 89 minutes
- Country: Indonesia
- Language: Indonesian

Something in the Way is a 2013 Indonesian drama film directed, written, and produced by Teddy Soeriaatmadja. It stars Reza Rahadian and Ratu Felisha. In between Lovely Man (2011) and About a Woman (2015), it is the second part of Soeriaatmadja's Intimacy trilogy. It had its world premiere at the 63rd Berlin International Film Festival on 8 February 2013.

== Premise ==
Ahmad, a devout taxi driver with a pornography addiction, falls in love with Kinar, his sex worker neighbour.

== Cast ==
- Reza Rahadian as Ahmad
- Ratu Felisha as Kinar

== Release ==
Something in the Way had its world premiere at the 63rd Berlin International Film Festival at the Panorama section on 8 February 2013. Rahadian explained on his Twitter account that the film would not be screened in Indonesian theatres, due to its subject matter.

In 2025, it was screened at the 20th Jogja-NETPAC Asian Film Festival at the special program, Reza Rahadian: 20 Years Reflection, commemorating the Indonesian actor's twenty years of career.

== Reception ==
Writing for The Hollywood Reporter, Elizabeth Kerr commended the film's cinematography, calling it as "sultry, almost sensual". She further criticized how the film "trades in cliché without ever reframing or challenging a familiar story".

=== Accolades ===
Award / Film Festival	Date of ceremony	Category	Recipient(s)	Result	Ref.
Maya Awards	21 December 2013	Best Feature Film	Something in the Way	Nominated	
Maya Awards	21 December 2013	Best Leading Actress	Ratu Felisha	Nominated	
Maya Awards	21 December 2013	Best Original Screenplay	Teddy Soeriaatmadja	Nominated	
