= Chang Chen Ghost Stories (2015 film) =

- Poster
- 张震讲故事之鬼迷心窍
- Directed by: Zhengchao Xu
- Starring: Hans Zhang; Li Zhang; Hsin-Ai Lee; Haoran Zhang; Ryan Zhu; Wei Kong; Frank Fan
- Production companies: Bingbing Li Studio; Renquan Studio; Beijing MaxTimes Culture Development; Beijing Weiying Shidai Technology; Yuan Xian Tong; Shenzhen Baihui Entertainment
- Release date: July 3, 2015
- Running time: 87 minutes
- Country: China
- Language: Mandarin
- Box office: CN¥20.9 million

Chang Chen Ghost Stories (Chinese: 张震讲故事之鬼迷心窍) is a 2015 Chinese suspense thriller film directed by Zhengchao Xu. It was released on July 3, 2015.

== Cast ==
- Hans Zhang
- Li Zhang
- Li Xin'ai
- Haoran Zhang
- Ryan Zhu
- Wei Kong
- Frank Fan

== Reception ==
=== Box office ===
The film earned CN¥20.915 million at the Chinese box office.
