= Li Xin'ai =

Chinese actress

- Born: Li Zhen (李真); April 10, 1990 (age 36); Shanxi, Xi'an, China
- Other name: Lee Hsin Ai
- Occupation: Actress
- Years active: 2013–present
- Agent: Chuangying Movies

Li Xin'ai (Chinese: 李心艾, born 10 April 1990), also known as Lee Hsin Ai, is a Chinese actress. She is of one-quarter Russian origin. She made her acting debut in Jay Chou's film The Rooftop.

== Filmography ==
=== Film ===
Year	English title	Chinese title	Role	Notes
2013	The Rooftop	天台爱情	Li Xinai	
2015	Chang Chen Ghost Stories	张震讲故事之鬼迷心窍	Nian Nian	
2015	Forever Young	栀子花开	Gao Meixue	
2017		再见偏执狂	Nian Nian	

=== Television series ===
Year	English title	Chinese title	Role	Notes
2014	Cosmetology High	美人制造	Zhuge Fairy	
2015	Fireworks	花火	Wei Wei	
2015	Legend of Ban Shu	班淑传奇	Kou Lanzhi	
2016	1931 Love	1931年的爱情	He Mulan	
2016	The Princess Weiyoung	锦绣未央	Li Changle	
2017	The Song	恋恋阙歌	Qin Keqing	
2017	Tribes and Empires: Storm of Prophecy	海上牧云记	Heshu Hongling	
2017	As Flowers Fade and Fly Across the Sky	花谢花飞花满天	Princess Qingcheng	
2018	Woman in Love	海上嫁女记	Angela	
2018	The Faded Light Years	浪漫星星	Mu Lingshan	
2020	Beautiful Reborn Flower	彼岸花	Ah Li	

== Discography ==
Year	English title	Chinese title	Album	Notes
2013		快門慢舞	The Rooftop OST	with Darren Chiu
