= Pontianak (film) =

1957 horror film by Balakrishna Narayana Rao

- Directed by: B.N. Rao
- Written by: Abdul Razak
- Starring: Maria Menado; M. Amin
- Music by: Zubir Said
- Production company: Cathay-Keris Film Productions
- Release date: April 27, 1957 (Singapore)
- Running time: 110 minutes
- Countries: Malaysia; Singapore
- Language: Malay

Pontianak is a 1957 Malay horror film directed by Indian film director Balakrishna Narayana Rao, popularly known as B.N. Rao, and starring Maria Menado and M. Amin. Based on the Malay folktales of a blood-sucking ghost born from a woman who dies in childbirth, the smash hit premiered on 27 April 1957 and screened for almost three months at the local Cathay cinemas. Its success spawned two sequels, Dendam Pontianak (Revenge of the Pontianak, 1957) and Sumpah Pontianak (Curse of the Pontianak, 1958). It is also said to have launched the Pontianak genre in Malaysia and Singapore, with rival Shaw producing its own Pontianak trilogy and several movies of the same genre were also produced in Malaysia.

The film is believed to be lost, along with its sequel, with multiple conflicting accounts regarding their disappearance. One version suggests that producer Ho Ah Loke deliberately discarded the film in a mining pool out of frustration. Another claims that his wife disposed of the reels due to her dissatisfaction with storing films in their home's air-conditioned room. A third account states that Ho discarded the films during a routine house clearing, also into a mining pool.

== Synopsis ==
An elderly man named Wak Dollah finds an abandoned girl in the forest and raises her as his adopted daughter, naming her Comel. Living in isolation, Wak Dollah authors a book on traditional medicine and instructs Comel to destroy all his writings after his death. While fulfilling his wish, Comel discovers a book detailing a ritual for beauty enhancement. She performs the ritual during a full moon and awakens transformed into a beautiful woman, unaware that the beauty comes with a curse: she must never taste blood. Comel eventually marries Othman, the village chief's son, and has a daughter named Maria. When Othman is bitten by a snake, he urges Comel to suck the venom from the wound. Tasting blood violates the curse, causing Comel to revert to a monstrous form. She disappears and becomes a Pontianak, an undead creature who preys on men to retain her beauty. She continues to visit Maria secretly and brings her forest fruits, while terrorizing the village at night in her vampiric form.

== Cast ==
- Maria Menado as Chomel
- M. Amin as Othman
- Mustapha Maarof as Samad
- Salmah Ahmad as Maria
- M. Kassim as Tabib Razak
- Dollah Sarawak as Wak Dollah
- Hassan Temberang as Bomoh Karto
- Puteh Lawak as Dol
- Wahid Satay as Wak Satay
- Aman Belon
- Aini Jasmin
- Radia Sudiro

== Production ==
=== Release ===
Pontianak participated in the 4th Southeast Asia Film Festival (later known as the Asia-Pacific Film Festival), held in Tokyo, Japan in May 1957. It was screened alongside Mega Mendong, directed by L. Krishnan, and Anak-Ku Sazali, directed by Phani Majumdar.

== Reception ==
=== Box office ===
In conjunction with Hari Raya Aidilfitri, Pontianak premiered with midnight screenings on 27 April 1957 at the Cathay Cinema in Singapore. Initially booked for a two-day run (1–2 May 1957), the film received such overwhelming public response that its screening was extended to 13 May 1957, totaling 13 consecutive days at Cathay. The cinema had previously only screened Hollywood and European films.

Following its initial run, Pontianak returned to cinemas from 1 to 27 August 1957 at the Taj Cinema in Geylang, where it ran for an additional 27 days. In total, the film was shown for 41 days during its first release in Singapore, including the midnight screenings. The film's commercial success surprised even the dominant Malay Film Productions (Shaw Brothers), which had not anticipated such a strong response to a rival production. Pontianak became one of the most successful Malay films of its time and marked a major achievement for its producer, Keris Film Productions, and distributor, the Cathay Organization.
