= Win Wu =

Indonesian singer

Win Wu YanHong
- 吳彥宏
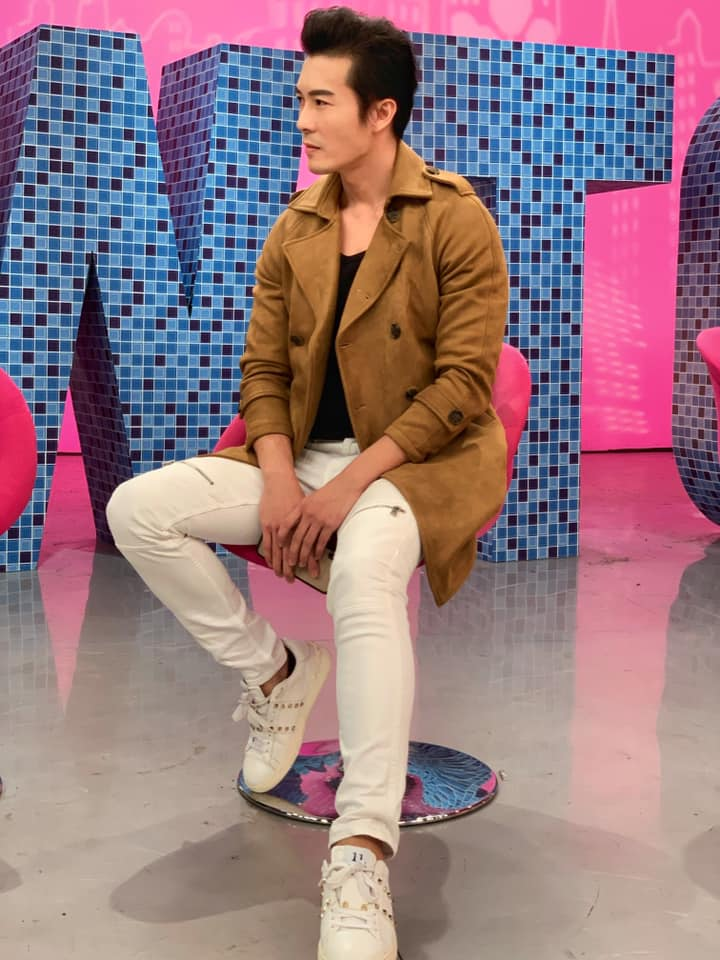
- Born: 11 January; Medan, Indonesia
- Other names: Win Wu in Taiwan; Win Woo; Winter (as member of Four Seasons); 吳俊賢 (Previous stage name)
- Occupations: Singer, lyricist, actor, model, presenter
- Years active: 2002 - Present
- Television: WTO Sisters Show (WTO姐妺會) (2017-Present) Students Coming (同學來了) (2024-Present) Super Entourage (小明星大跟班) (2023)
- Height: 1.80 m (5 ft 11 in)
- Musical career
- Origin: Indonesia
- Genres: Mandopop
- Instrument: Vocals
- Label: Universal Music Indonesia (2007-2009)

Win Wu YanHong (Chinese: 吳彥宏) is a Taiwan-based Indonesian Singer-Songwriter, actor, model, and presenter. He debuted in 2002 as a member of quartet band Four Seasons - the first mandarin boyband in Indonesia. The band was then signed under Universal Music Indonesia

== Personal life ==
Win Wu YanHong's passion in performing arts anchored in fond memories of his trips to cinemas with his belated father. “When I was a child, father and I used to walk to cinema (about 10-15minutes walk) and watched Andy Lau movies. There and then all I wanted is to be like him, a singer and actor; a multi-talented performer.”.

He formed this ambition growing up as an ethnic minority in the most populous Muslim country in the world, at a time when Chinese communities often experienced discrimination. After May 1998 riots in Indonesia where Chinese descendants were targeted victims, Socio-political democratization took place. And that's when Win Wu had his chance to break in to the entertainment industry; as a member of Indonesia's very first Mandarin boyband that made it into recording company.

== Career ==
=== Singer & Songwriter ===
Win Wu YanHong debuted as a member of quartet boyband Four Seasons - Indonesia's first Mandarin boyband under Universal Music Indonesia in 2002, riding in the wave of F4 Mandopop craze in early 2000. Although referred to as boyband, on the contrary to common boyband and pop-band practises, members of Four Seasons composed their own songs. In the album Tian Zi (天子) (released in 2007), the members composed a total of 8 out of 10 tracks.

He then took a huge leap of moving to Taiwan in 2011. It was a bumpy ride in adopting Mandarin as first language. Overcoming the language barrier, Win Wu manage to write a number of mandarin songs lyrics for fellow Indonesian Mandarin singer Alena Wu namely Cherry Blossom and Seindah Diriku. Including duet that Win Wu sang with Alena Wu :Thank You 谢谢 and A Minute of Hope (一分鐘的希望) (2011); a song meant to encourage people who are struggling to achieve their dream, inspired by his own personal struggle.

Win Wu also wrote lyrics for his original single track titled Going Home 回家 (2018).

=== Screen Presence ===
==== WTO Sisters Show (WTO姐妹會) ====
As an Indonesian representative in Taiwanese culture talk show WTO Sisters Show, Win Wu is one of the cast since 2017.

In the show he is sometimes dubbed as the handsome role-model husband/father.

==== Movie ====
Appeared in Jay Chou's second self-directed film 天台爱情 The Rooftop (2012) as LuoMen. Win Wu won Best actor & Best Action Scene in 48 Hour Film Project Taipei 2016 in movie titled Bloody Knows. Also starring in another 48 Hour Film Project Taipei 2014 movie titled BAR 吧檯 which won Best Lines.As leading male in short movies under Liwu Entertainment titled 愛不简单 Love Is Not Simple (2016) and What Makes it Perfect (2016).

==== Commercials, Modelling, & Music Video Appearances ====
Win Wu has appeared in numerous name brand video commercials in Taiwan; namely Sharp AQUOS XLED (2022), The Good Day (2023) with Ella SHE, Quaker (2020), Taiwan Stock Exchange (2020), Bissell (2020), Hyundai Tucson(2019), and with Taiwanese selebgram Zamy Ding in Durex Air commercial.

Win Wu also had Music Video appearance as lead in Kenji Wu's 吳克群 我能給的 MV (2010)

== Discography ==
=== With Four Seasons ===
- 天子 Children of Heaven
- 想说声对不起 Wanna Say Sorry
- 找回真爱 Quest of True Love
- Good Bye My Love
- 四季之爱 Four Seasons of Love
- Happy Birthday
- Angel
- 我不怕 Fearless
- 最美丽的回忆 The Most Beautiful Memory
- 四季之爱（快）Four Seasons of Love (alternate version)

=== Duets (as Singer & Lyricist) ===
- 谢谢 Thank You (feat. Alena Wu)
- 一分鐘的希望 A Minute of Hope (feat. Alena Wu)

=== Singles (as Singer & Lyricist) ===
- 回家 Going Home

=== Lyrics written for other singers ===
- 樱花飞 Cherry Blossom

== Filmography ==
=== TV Show ===
- WTO Sisters Show (WTO姐妹會)
- Students Coming (同學來(了）
- Super Entourage (小明星大跟班)
- Half and Half (二分之一強)
- Hot Door Night (綜藝大熱門)
- Where Are You From? (請問你是哪裡人)

=== Movie ===
- 天台爱情 The Rooftop (2012) as LuoMen
- 痞子英雄2 Black & White: The Dawn of Justice
- 八尺門的辯護人 Port of Lies as 巴渝 / Bayu

=== Short films ===
- Bloody Knows - Best actor & Best Action Scene in 48 Hour Film Project Taipei 2016
- BAR 吧檯- won Best Lines 48 Hour Film Project Taipei 2014
- Restart - TMC London Film Festival Official Selection
- 愛不简单 Love Is Not Simple (2016)
- What Makes it Perfect (2016)
