= Kuntilanak (2018 film) =

- Poster
- Directed by: Rizal Mantovani
- Written by: Alim Sudio
- Starring: Sandrinna M. Skornicki; Aurélie Moeremans; Fero Walandouw
- Distributed by: Netflix
- Release date: June 15, 2018
- Country: Indonesia
- Language: Indonesian

Kuntilanak (subtitled Ghost in the Mirror in Singapore) is a 2018 Indonesian horror film directed by Rizal Mantovani and written by Alim Sudio.

The plot revolves around five children who find a mirror in their orphanage. The mirror contains a ghost that kidnaps children and imprisons them inside it.

== Cast ==
- Sandrinna M. Skornicki as Dinda
- Aurélie Moeremans as Lydia
- Fero Walandouw as Glenn
- Nena Rosier as Tante Donna
- Andryan Bima as Kresna
- Ciara Nadine Brosnan as Ambar
- Adlu Fahrezi as Panji
- Ali Fikry as Miko
- Naufal Ho as Anjas
- Wina Marrino as Miranda
- Aditya Rino as Cameraman
- Aqi Singgih as Lukman
- Ady Sky as Creative

== Production ==
This film is a remake of the 2006 film with the same name. "Is there any relation with the previous story? Basically there is an element that is a 'connector', that is a mirror. And that is the important meaning of Kuntilanak then and now," said the executive producer, Amrit Punjabi.

== Reception ==
A critic from IDN Times rated the film four out of five and wrote that "From the beginning of the film, the shock therapy that is presented raises your adrenaline which is then played continuously until the middle and end of the story. Because this film succeeded in conveying the impression of horror with good execution and characterization".

== Sequel ==
A sequel, Kuntilanak 2, was released on June 4, 2019 and 3 years later Kuntilanak 3 was released on 30 April 2022.
