= Masayu Anastasia =

Indonesian model and actress (born 1984)

- Born: Masayu Anastasia; January 19, 1984 (age 42); Jakarta, Indonesia
- Occupations: Celebrity, Model
- Years active: 2004 - present
- Spouse: Lembu Wiworo Jati (m. 2008; div. 2016)
- Children: Samara Anaya Amandari

Masayu Anastasia (born January 19, 1984) is an Indonesian model and actress. She starred in "Juleha Anak Betawi Asli", Gengsi Gede-gedean, Haruskah Ku Mati, Laila, Karunia-Mu, Setetes Embun, Doiku Beken, Cinta Merah Jambu and the movie Buruan Cium Gue and Selamanya. She was also cast as a model in music videos for Peterpan and Ressa Herlambang.

== Personal life ==
On July 6, 2008, Masayu Anastasia married Lembu Wiworo Jati, the lead vocal of Club Eighties band. On October 19, 2009 both got a daughter, Samara Anaya Amandari. But on August 31, 2015, Masayu Anastasia proposed to divorce at South Jakarta Islamic Court.

== Filmography ==
- Buruan Cium Gue (2004)
- Selamanya (2007)
- Kawin Kontrak (2008)
- Pengantin Topeng (2010)
- Laskar Pemimpi (2010)
- Susah Jaga Keperawanan di Jakarta (2010)
- Cinta di Saku Celana (2012)
- Rayya, Cahaya Diatas Cahaya (2012)

=== Soap operas (TV series) ===
- Janji Hati
- Jangan Ucapkan Cinta
- ABG 1&2
- Setetes Embun
- Gengsi Gede-Gedean
- The Pakis 2
- Doiku Beken
- KaruniaMu
- Gadis Korek Api
- Toyib Minta Kawin
- Haruskah Ku Mati
- Laila
- Inikah Cinta
- Cinta Merah Jambu
- Aku Bukan Dia
- Dewa
- Putri yang Ditukar
- Itsnaini (2012)
- Putri Bidadari (2012 - 2013)
- Cinta di Langit Taj Mahal (2015)

== FTV ==
- Cinta 117 kg
- Cinta Ke 50 (With Calvin Ray)
- Bos Ku Malang Bos Ku Sayang(With Vino Bastian)
- Sopir Taksi Jatuh Cinta (With Mike Lewis)
- Suamimu Suamiku Juga (With Adam Jordan)
- Bidadari Pencuri Sandar (With Marcell Darwin Lia Waode Eva Anindhita Tamara Bleszynski as Tania Play Wonosobo Central Java
- Juleha Kaya Mendadak (With Ibnu Jamil)

== Brand ambassador ==
- Fruit Tea (2002)
- Fresh & Natural (2003)
- Mie Sedap (2004)
- Biore (2005)
- Buavita (2005)
- Panasonic (2005)
- Hers Protex (2006)
- Wall's Corneto (2006)
- Toyota Avanza (2011)
