= Universal Music Indonesia =

Record label and Indonesian unit of the Universal Music Group

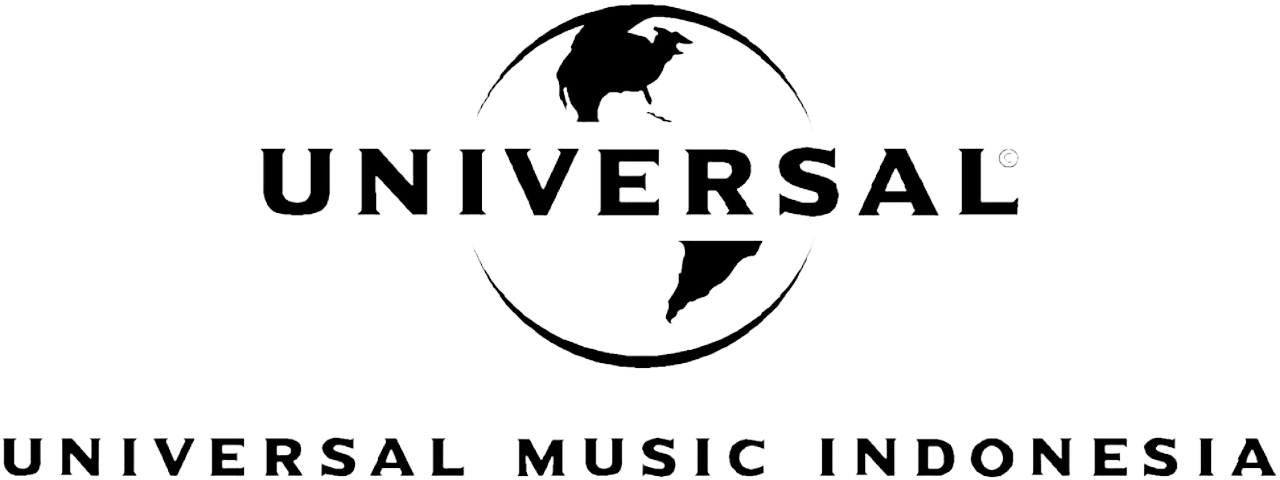
- Parent company: Universal Music Group
- Founded: 1987; 39 years ago
- Genre: Various
- Country of origin: Indonesia
- Location: Karet Tengsin, Jakarta

Universal Music Indonesia, formerly Suara Sentral Sejati and PolyGram Indonesia, is an Indonesian company based in Jakarta. Founded in 1987, the company is a branch of Universal Music Group. This company has produced several successful singers on the Asian music scene such as Brisia Jodie, Marion Jola, Tiara Andini, Ziva Magnolya, Keisya Levronka, and Lyodra.

Currently, artists under Universal Music Indonesia tend to focus more on Indonesian Idol alumni, starting from 2012. Previously, this record company had managed several artists who were popular with the teenage generation in the middle to upper segment, such as RAN, Raisa Andriana or Ecoutez. However, in the midst of the soaring rise of Indonesian Idol alumni on this label, Universal still maintains the alternative pop rock music group Samsons (from the Bams era, Aria Dinata to Adrian Martadinata as vocalist) as one of its flagship artists.

== Artists ==
=== Current ===
- Marion Jola
- Keisya Levronka
- Lyodra Ginting
- Nabila Taqiyyah
- Raisa Andriana (with Juni Records)
- Rizky Febian (with RFAS Music)
- Salma Salsabil
- Samsons
- Tiara Andini
- Ziva Magnolya

=== Former ===
- ADA Band
- Dewi Sandra
- Evie Tamala
- Gigi
- Gloria Jessica
- Ikke Nurjanah
- RAN
- Rhoma Irama
- Seventeen
- Seringai
- Four Seasons

== Sub labels ==
=== Label In-house ===
- Capitol
- Def Jam Recordings
- Interscope Geffen A&M
- Island Records
- Polydor Records
- Republic Records
- The Verve Label
- Virgin Music

=== Distribution ===
- Juni Records
- Wonderland Records

== See also ==
- List of Universal Music Group labels
- Lists of record labels
