= Samsons =

Indonesian pop rock band

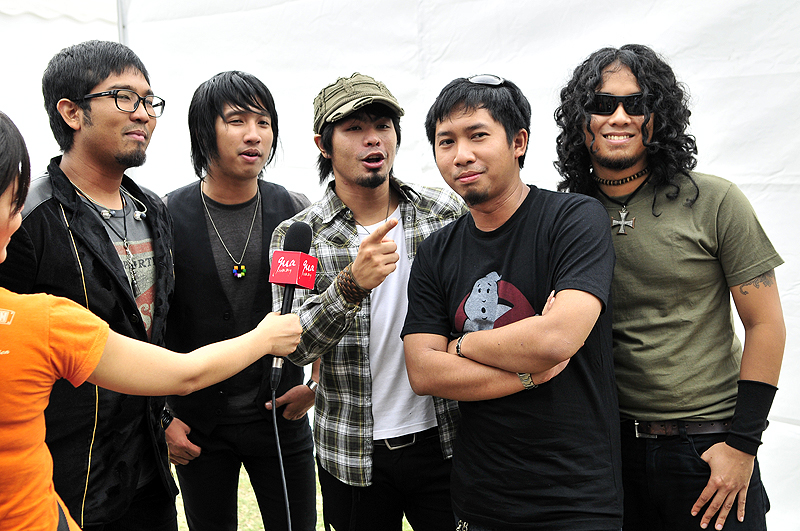
- Samsons in 2008

Background information
- Origin: Jakarta, Indonesia
- Genres: Pop rock, slow rock, alternative rock, pop
- Years active: 2003–present Hiatus: 2011–2012
- Labels: Massive; Universal
- Members: Adrian Martadinata; Erik Partogi Siagian; Irfan Aulia; Aldri Dataviadi
- Past members: Bambang "Bams" Reguna Bukit; Chandra "Konde" Christanto; Aria Dinata
- Website: https://www.samsonstheband.com

The Samsons (stylised SamSonS) are an Indonesian pop-rock band formed in Jakarta in 2003. They have released five albums and two singles.

The band has four members: singer Adrian Martadinata, guitarists Irfan Aulia and Erik Partogi Siagian, and bassist Aldri Dataviadi. Former members include vocalist Aria Dinata, drummers Chandra "Konde" Christanto, and Bambang "Bams" Reguna Bukit.

== Career ==
According to a biography, the band was originally called Equal. Before recording, the band was required by their record label to undergo a one-week quarantine in Puncak, West Java. Konde would practice drumming while the other band members were asleep. They jokingly said his behaviour was like that of the strong, biblical figure Samson. Eventually, the name Samson was so frequently used that the band adopted it as their own name.

The Samsons' first album, "Naluri Lelaki", was released on November 25, 2005, by Universal Music Indonesia. It sold over 1.1 million copies and was certified multi-platinum by Universal Music Indonesia. Naluri Lelaki received awards in several categories during the Anugerah Musik Indonesia (Indonesian Music Awards) in 2006, including Best Newcomer, Best Group/Duo, Best Song (for "Kenangan Terindah"), and Best Album.

The band's second album, "Penantian Hidup", was released on July 19, 2007. The first single from "Penantian Hidup", "Kisah Tak Sempurna", topped Indonesian and Malaysian radio music charts, followed by the second single, "Luluh". An extended version of the album, "Penantian Hidup: Platinum Edition", was released in 2008 with three additional songs.

Samsons' third self-titled album, SAMSONS, was produced using analog format and released in 2009. Their single, "Tak Ada Tempat Seperti Surga", earned Samsons their third Multi-Platinum Award from Universal Music Indonesia, with the album selling over 4 million physical and digital downloads.

In mid-2012, Bambang "Bams" Reguna Bukit left Samsons. On August 21, 2013, Aria Dinata, the former vocalist of Nyawa, a band from Banjarmasin, Indonesia, joined Samsons as their new vocalist, coinciding with the release of "Di Ujung Jalan", the single from their fourth album, Perihal Besar.

The band released the single "I Love You" in 2016, followed by "Cinta Mati" in 2017. Both tracks were released by Universal Music Indonesia. On December 18, 2020, the band released their fifth album titled V, which contained 12 songs, including four previously released singles ("I Love You", "Cinta Mati" "Tuhan Tak Pernah Salah", and "Jika Nanti"). V was the band's last album with Aria Dinata as vocalist.

Adrian Martadinata joined Samsons as their new vocalist in March 2022, following the departure of Aria Dinata. The band released two singles in 2022: "Rayu" and "Rasa yang Salah".

== Discography ==
=== Albums ===
- Naluri Lelaki (2005)
- Penantian Hidup (2007)
- Samsons (2009)
- Perihal Besar (2013)
- V (2020)

=== Singles ===
- Rayu (2022)
- Rasa yang Salah (2022)
