= Maria Menado =

Sulawesi Malay actress (1932–2026)

Yang Hormat Dato' Sri Maria Menado SSAP DIMP
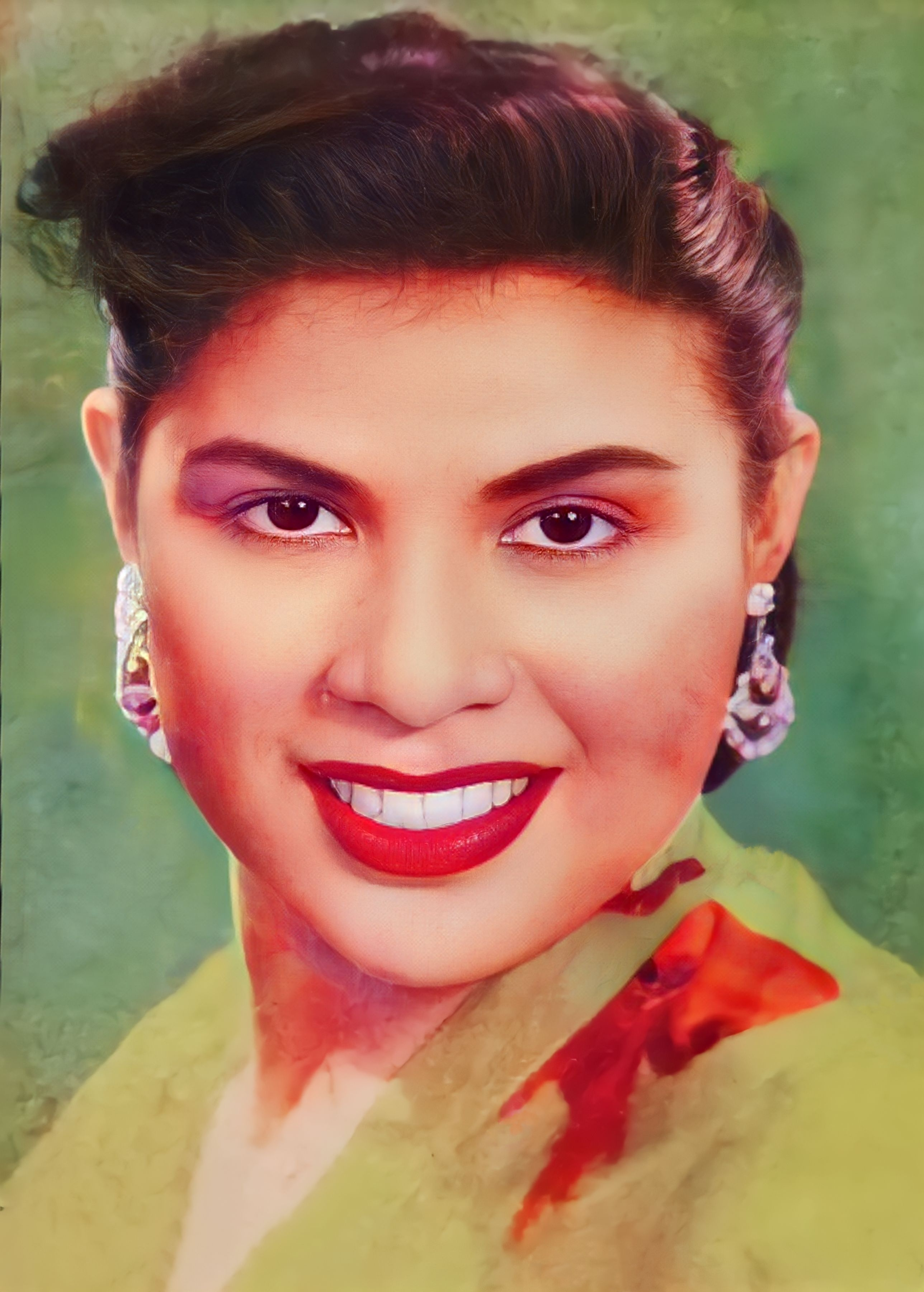
- Menado in 1959
- Born: Liesbet Dotulong; 2 February 1932; Tondano, Manado Residency, Dutch East Indies (now Indonesia)
- Died: 30 April 2026 (aged 94); Kuala Lumpur, Malaysia
- Other name: Liesje Mandagi
- Citizenship: Malaysia
- Occupations: Actress; model; producer
- Years active: 1951–2015
- Spouses: A. Razak Sheikh Mohamed (m. 1950; div. 1963) Abu Bakar of Pahang (m. 1963; died 1974) Mohammad Husain Yusof (m. 1978; died 2000)
- Children: 5

Maria Menado (born Liesbet Dotulong; 2 February 1932 – 30 April 2026), also known as Liesje Mandagi, was a Sulawesi-born Malay actress, model and producer who is known for her contributions to Singaporean-Malaysian cinema in the 1950s and 1960s. At the height of her fame she was voted “Malaya’s Most Beautiful” by Times Magazine and the “Best Dressed Woman in South East Asia” by publisher United Press International. In addition to acting, she also sang and went on to direct and produce films under her own production company, Maria Menado Productions. Menado was Minahasan and was born in Manado, Dutch East Indies (present Indonesia).

== Life and career ==
Maria Menado was born Liesbet Dotulong on 2 February 1932 at Tonsea Lama in North Tondano, Dutch East Indies, to Abdullah Dotulong. When she was seven years old, her parents died, and she was sent to live with her aunt and uncle in Makassar. They eventually moved to Jakarta to escape fighting between the Dutch and Indonesian nationalists. By the time Liesbet was seventeen, she was known locally for her beauty, and appeared as a fashion model in magazines and newspapers. In 1950, she travelled from Bandung to Singapore in a group led by Fifi Young, who held a kebaya fashion show there.

While she was with her aunt and uncle in Malaysia, Liesbet became interested in the Maria Hertogh riots, which were occurring at the time. Maria Hertogh was a Dutch girl who was sent to live with a Malay Muslim family, and became the subject of a highly publicized custody battle which led to religious race riots in Singapore. Due to Liesbet's interest in the case, and her birthplace of Manado, Indonesia, she was dubbed "Maria of Manado" by friends. The name stuck, and for the rest of her career in films she was referred to as Maria Menado.

After Maria's photos appeared in newspapers and magazines as a fashion model, her career as a film actress began in 1951. Shaw Brothers offered Maria the role of the leading lady alongside P. Ramlee in the film "Penghidupan".

However, it was her role as a vampire in the film "Pontianak" that gave Maria fame in 1957. "Pontianak" was the first Malay horror film. The script for this film is a collaboration with her ex-husband, A. Razak Sheikh Mohamed. Maria supplied the vampire stories she had heard while in Indonesia and they weaved the film's plot together.

Her transformation from a beautiful woman to a hunchback and then a vampire took hours of decorating. Maria also had to lean back without moving so that the change could be filmed little by little. Unlike now, there were no computer graphics back then to make corrections, and everything had to be done manually. However, the film reaches a fairly realistic level as can be seen from the reports of several people fainting after watching the shocking scenes. Its screening in Cathay cinemas lasted for 12 days. This is a major achievement, especially because Malay films have never been shown in Cathay cinemas. Maria then acted in the following two sequels, Dendam Pontianak (1957) and Sumpah Pontianak (1958).

At the height of her fame, she was given the role of an evil character alongside Shammi Kapoor in a Hindi film titled "Singapore". The film was shot in Singapore and Mumbai. In a period of 12 years, Maria acted in more than 20 films including her own production, Maria Menado Production (M. M. Production) through the film Siti Zubaidah in 1961. She was the first Malay female film producer.

Maria herself played the main role as Siti Zubaidah. Her involvement as a producer was not only proud but she also played the role of producer and actress at the same time which is rarely done by a producer.

Three other films produced by her company are Darahku, Bunga Tanjung and Pontianak Kembali.

In 1963, Menado married Sultan Abu Bakar of Pahang, who was 27 years her senior. The marriage ended Menado's film career as her films were no longer allowed to be screened in the theatres or on television. They had three children: Tengku Norashikin Sultan Abu Bakar, Tengku Idris Sultan Abu Bakar, and Tengku Baharuddin Sultan Abu Bakar. Menado died of old age on 30 April 2026, at the age of 94. She was buried at the Bukit Kiara Muslim Cemetery in Damansara, Kuala Lumpur.

== Awards and nominations ==
  - Darjah Indera Mahkota Pahang (DIMP) - Dato' (1980)
  - Darjah Sri Sultan Ahmad Shah Pahang (SSAP) - Dato' Sri (24 October 2017)

Year	Award	Film	Category	Results
1957	Malaysian Film Festival	Pontianak	Best Actress	Won
1951/1952	Malaysian Film Festival	Penghidupan	Best Supporting Actress	Won

== Filmography ==
Year	Film	Director	Studio	Notes	Ref.
1951	Live (Penghidupan)	L. Krishnan	Malay Film Productions	Co-starring Malaysian actor P. Ramlee.	
1951	Pearl Island (Pulau Mutiara)	S. Ramanathan	Malay Film Productions		
1952	Jewel in the Slum (Permata di-Perlimbahan)	Haji Mahadi	Malay Film Productions	Often considered the first film by a Malaysian director.	
1952	Farmer Girl (Gadis Peladang)	B. S. Rajhans	Malay Film Productions		
1954	Temptation (Nafsu)	L. Krishnan	Cathay-Keris Film Productions		
1954	Gamble (Pertarohan)	L. Krishnan	Cathay-Keris Film Productions		
1955	Riding on Love/Loving Another (Kasih Menumpang)	L. Krishnan	Cathay-Keris Film Productions		
1955	Happy Holidays (Selamat Hari Raya)	L. Krishnan	Cathay-Keris Productions		
1955	My Brothers and Sisters (Saudaraku)	Laurie Friedman	Cathay-Keris Productions		
1957	Vampire (Pontianak)	B.N. Rao	Cathay-Keris Productions	The first in the popular Pontianak trilogy, now believed to be a lost film.	
1957	Vampire's Revenge (Dendam Pontianak)	B.N. Rao	Cathay-Keris Productions	The second in the Pontianak trilogy, now believed to be a lost film.	
1958	The Curse of the Vampire (Sumpah Pontianak)	B.N. Rao	Cathay-Keris Productions	The third and final film in the Pontianak trilogy.	
1958	The Elusive Man (Orang Lichin)	L. Krishnan	Cathay-Keris Productions		
1958	Pomegranate Shawl (Selendang Delima)	K.M. Basker	Cathay-Keris Productions		
1958	The Sun (Mata Hari)	Ramon Estella	Malay Film Productions		
1959	Habis Gelap Datang Terang (Gone Dark Comes Light)	Ho Ah Loke & Usmar Ismail	Merdeka Film Enterprise & Perfini		
1960	Singapore	Shakti Samanta	Eagle Films		
1961	Sultan Mahmud Dies (Sultan Mahmud Mangkat Dijulang)	K.M. Basker	Cathay-Keris Film Productions		
1961	Victim of Malice (Korban Fitnah)	Usmar Ismail	Malay Film Productions		
1961	Siti Zubaidah	B.N. Rao	Cathay-Keris, Maria Menado Productions	The first film Menado produced and released under her production company, Siti Zubaidah is adapted from a famous Malaysian poem.	
1962	Tun Fatimah	Salleh Ghani	Cathay-Keris Film Productions		
1963	King Bersiong (Raja Bersiong)	K.M. Basker	Cathay-Keris, Maria Menado Productions	Released under Menado's production company.	
1963	My Blood (Darahku)	Ramon Estella	Cathay-Keris, Maria Menado Productions	Released under Menado's production company.	
1963	Cape of Flowers (Bunga Tanjong)	Ramon Estella	Cathay-Keris, Maria Menado Productions	Released under Menado's production company.	
1964	The Vampire Returns (Pontianak Kembali)	Ramon Estella	Cathay-Keris, Maria Menado Productions	An addition to the Pontianak series, released under Menado's production company.	
2015	Our Sister Mambo	Ho Widing	Cathay Asia Films		
