= Astral spirit =

Religious concept

An astral spirit is a term used in spiritualism and holism and can be described as existing in space with no physical body. The Astral Spirit exists in what is called the Astral Plane. Depending on the time period and culture, the term can have several meanings. It was thought to be one of the three parts of the human soul that contained the "thoughts, cogitations, desires, imaginations that were impressed upon the mind at the time of death" as well as lust and anger. Philosopher's had different viewpoints and ideas of the Astral Spirits as Marsilio Ficino considered it to be a link between the physical body and soul, while others such as Jean Fernel associated it more with animal spirits. Philosopher Henry More introduced the term into the medical setting and considered the astral spirit to be a part of the body that was separate from the "rational soul" and viewed it as the "seat of impulses". He believed that man was responsible still for controlling these impulses and enthusiasm. Astral spirits have also been associated with spirit and witchcraft, specifically black magic. The term was also used in relation to the concept of ghosts and vampirism in the nineteenth century.

== History ==
The word, "Astral" translates to "connected with or resembling the stars." It is considered the vehicle of the soul. The Astral Spirit, also known as the Astral body, has to do with the Astral Plane. The Astral Spirit is made up of what is almost identical to the stars. Souls pass through this substance as they travel down to Earth in a starlike shape. When it was still viewed as being demonic in origin and having association with spirit and witchcraft, the definition of Astral Spirits considered the entities to be completely separate from the concept of the astral spirit as something that was considered to be part of or attached to the human body or soul. When the term was used in relation to ghosts and vampirism in the nineteenth century, spiritualists believed that the astral spirit would rise from the grave of the deceased in order to steal the blood and vitality of the living while the physical body would remain in the grave. This form of the astral spirit, while sometimes considered to be harmful, fell into the Platonic definition as it was considered to be a remnant of the deceased in some form. Astral spirits were also considered to be potentially capable of fathering a child, as there were some tales of astral spirits reportedly impregnating the wife of a deceased hajduk. During the Renaissance time period it was used in a Platonic format to designate the "aetheric vehicle or starlike garment surrounding the soul which descended from heaven and entered the individual body". During this time, the theory of the Astral Body was not generally considered safe or respectable. Philosopher Fernel's work was considered a "careful and systematic medical treatise", however.

== Philosophical Viewpoints ==
From a philosophical standpoint, there are many different viewpoints when it comes to the Astral Spirit. Philosopher Fernel's work was considered a "systematic medical treatise". He believed animal and medical spirits played a huge part and were his primary focus. It is also assumed that Fernel's primary direct source was Nicolas Leonicus. Fernel believed that the Astral Spirit descended, while Marsilio Ficino denied this completely. Philosophers like Leonicus were careful to make it known that any platonic view of the Astral Spirit did "not conform to Christian doctrine."
