= Keisya Levronka =

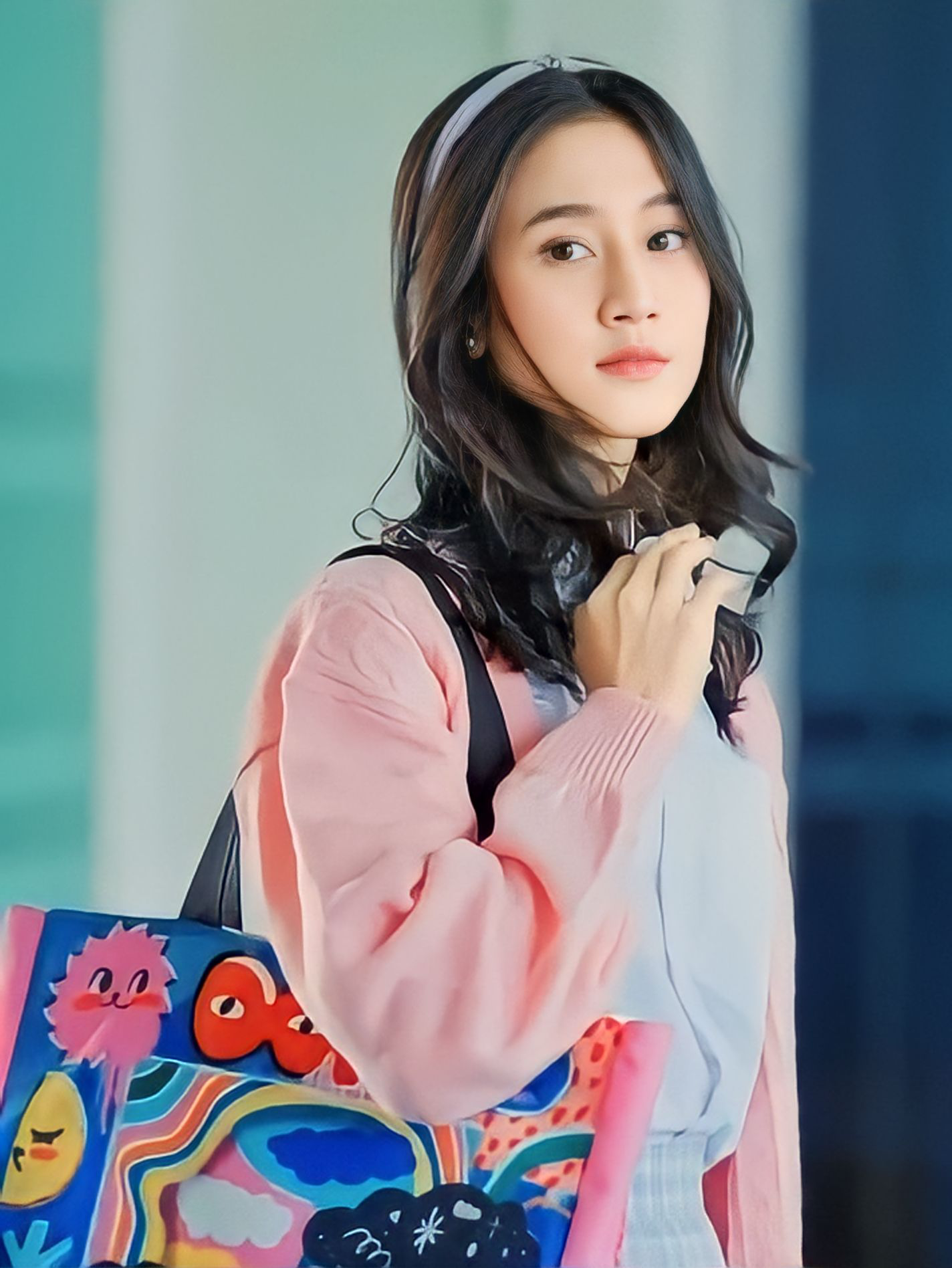
- Keisya Levronka in 2022
- Born: February 2, 2003 (age 23); Malang, East Java, Indonesia
- Occupations: Singer; actress
- Years active: 2019–present
- Awards: Anugerah Industri Muzik
- Musical career
- Genres: Pop
- Instrument: Vocal
- Years active: 2020–present
- Label: Universal Music Indonesia

Keisya Levronka (born 2 February 2003) is an Indonesian singer and actress. She started her career in the entertainment world through her participation in the tenth season of the Indonesian Idol talent show which was broadcast on the RCTI in 2019 – 2020. After Indonesian Idol, she joined the record label Universal Music Indonesia and made her debut as a singer with a song titled "Jadi Kekasihku Saja". Apart from having a career in the music world, Keisya Levronka also entered the world of acting in 2021, with her acting debut in the series Jingga dan Senja.

In 2022, her fourth song, "Tak Ingin Usai" managed to top various digital music charts in Indonesia, including the Billboard Indonesia charts for 11 weeks. The song also brought her the first award of her career at a music award event in Malaysia, the Anugerah Industri Muzik, for "Best Malay Language Song Presented by a Foreign Artist".

== Discography ==
=== Studio albums ===
Title	Album details	Ref.
Levronka	Released: 12 May 2023; Label: Universal Music Indonesia; Format: CD, digital download	

=== Compilation albums ===
Title	Album details	Ref.
Symphony From The Heart	Released: 21 March 2025; Label: Universal Music Indonesia; Format: Digital download	—N/a
