= Kuntilanak 2 =

- Poster
- Directed by: Rizal Mantovani
- Written by: Ve Handojo; Rizal Mantovani
- Produced by: Raam Punjabi
- Starring: Julie Estelle; Evan Sanders
- Cinematography: Teguh Uche Santoso
- Edited by: Adrian Nugraha
- Music by: Andi Rianto
- Release date: 10 October 2007
- Running time: 102 minutes
- Country: Indonesia
- Language: Indonesian

Kuntilanak 2 (English title: The Chanting 2) is a 2007 Indonesian horror film directed Rizal Mantovani and starring Julie Estelle and Evan Sanders. The film is a sequel to Kuntilanak (2006).

== Cast ==
- Julie Estelle - Samantha
- Evan Sanders - Agung
- Sutan Amanullah - Grandpa
- Bella Esperance - Ening
- Ibnu Jamil - Iwank
- Buanergis Muryono - Bambang
- Piet Pagau - Madeng
- Cepi Setiawan - Enceng
- Lita Soewardi - Bu Yanti
- Cindy Valerie - Yenny

== Production ==
The film was shot in an old building, in the Kota area, Central Jakarta. The band Koil created the song "Semoga Kau Sembuh, part II" for the film.

== Release ==
The film was initially scheduled to release during Eid and later July or August.

== Reception ==
A critic from monstasefilm wrote that "This film is a good example of how a sequel can be produced so badly. The advantages of the first film such as the set and mood are no longer visible".
