= Chih-yu Shih =

Taiwanese political scientist

- 石之瑜
- Born: August 8, 1958 (age 67); Taipei City

Education
- Education: National Taiwan University (BA); Harvard University (MPP); University of Denver (PhD)
- Doctoral advisor: Jonathan Adelman

Philosophical work
- Institutions: National Taiwan University; National Sun Yat-sen University
- Notable works: Chinese studies, anthropology of knowledge, international relations

Chih-yu Shih (Chinese: 石之瑜; pinyin: Shí Zhīyú; born 8 August 1958) is a political science professor in Taiwan and National Chair Professor of the Republic of China. He has proposed a balance of relationship theory that both universally applies to bilateral relationships and complements the existing balance of power theory.

== Life ==
Chih-yu Shih graduated from National Taiwan University. He earned an M.P.P. at Harvard University and Ph.D. at the Josef Korbel School of International Studies (the University of Denver).

He was a visiting scholar at Stanford, Duke, Princeton, Durham, Chuo University and University of Tübingen. His present occupation is:

- Life-time distinguished professor at National Taiwan University
- Adjunct professor at National Sun Yat-sen University

== List of works (books in English) ==
- Post-Chineseness: Cultural Politics and International Relations (Albany: State University of New York Press, 2022).
- Eros of International Relations: Self-feminizing and the Claiming of Postcolonial Chineseness (Hong Kong: Hong Kong University Press, 2022).
- Colonial Legacies and Contemporary Studies of China and Chineseness: Unlearning Binaries, Strategizing Self (Co-ed.) (Singapore: World Scientific, 2020)
- China Studies in the Philippines: Intellectual Paths and the Formation of a Field (Co-ed.) (London: Routledge, 2019).
- China Studies in South and Southeast Asia: Between Pro-China and Objectivism (Co-ed.) (Singapore: World Scientific, 2019).
- China and International Theory: The Balance of Relationships (London: Routledge, 2019).
- From Sinology to Post-Chineseness: Intellectual Histories of China, Chinese People and Chinese Civilization (ed.) (Beijing: Chinese Social Science Press, 2017).
- Producing China in Southeast Asia – Knowledge, Identity and Migrant Chineseness (ed.) (Singapore: Springer Nature, 2017).
- Post-Communist Sinology in Transformation: Views from the Czech Republic, *Mongolia, Poland, and Russia (ed.) (Hong Kong: Chinese University Press of Hong Kong, 2016).
- Understanding 21st Century China in Buddhist Asia: History, Modernity and International Relations (Co-ed.) (Bangkok: Asia Research Center, Chulalongkorn University, 2016).
- Post-Western International Relations Reconsidered: The Pre-modern Politics of Gongsun Long (New York: Palgrave, 2015).
- Re-producing Chineseness in Southeast Asia: Scholarship and Identity in Comparative Perspectives (ed.) (Abingdon, Oxfordshire: Routledge, 2015).*Harmonious Intervention: China’s Quest for Relational Security (Surrey: Ashgate, 2014).
- Multicultural China: A Statistical Year Book (Co-ed.) (New York: Springer, 2014).
- Borderland Politics in Northern India (Co-ed.) (Exon: Routledge, 2014).
- Sinicizing International Relations: Self, Civilization and Intellectual Politics of Subaltern East Asia (London: Palgrave, 2013).
- Tibetan Studies in Comparaitive Perspectives (co-ed.) (London: Routledge, 2012).
- On India By China: From Civilization to Nation State (co-ed.) (New York: Cambria, 2012).
- Civilization, Modernity, and Nation in East Asia (London: Routledge: 2012).
- 《はじめに──戦後日本の中国研究》（合編）（東京：平凡社，2010）.
- Democracy Made in Taiwan: The “Success State” as a Political Theory (Lanham: Lexington Press, 2007).
- Autonomy, Ethnicy and Poverty in Southwestern China: The State Turned Upside Down (London: Palgrave/Macmillan, 2007).
- Navigating Sovereignty: World Politics Lost in China (London: Palgrave/Macmillan, 2003).
- Negotiating Ethnicity in China: Citizenship as a Response to the State (New York: Routledge, 2002).
- Reform, Identity, and Chinese Foreign Policy (Taipei: Vanguard Foundation, 2000).
- Collective Democracy: The Political and Legal Reform in China (Hong Kong: The Chinese University of Hong Kong Press, together with Ann Arbor: University of Michigan Press, 1999).
- State and Society in China’s Political Economy: The Cultural Dynamics of China's Socialist Reform (Boulder: Lynne Rienner 1995).
- Symbolic War: The Chinese Use of Force, 1840-1980, (co-author) (Taipei: Institute of International Relations, 1993).
- China's Just World: The Morality of Chinese Foreign Policy (Boulder, Colo.: Lynne Rienner, 1993).
- Contending Dramas: A Cognitive Approach to International Organizations (co-editor) (New York: Praeger, 1992).
- The Spirit of Chinese Foreign Policy: A Psycho-cultural View (London: Macmillan 1990).

== Honours and awards ==
- Excellence Research Award, National Science Council 1995–99, 2004–07
- Fulbright Scholar 1997
- Ministry of Education Academic Award 2000
- National Chair Professor Life time, Ministry of Education 2001–2004, 2013–
- University Chair Professor 2007-2019

and many others.

== See also ==
- Lucian Pye
- Liberalism
- Postmodernism
- Deconstruction
