= Julie Yu-Wen Chen =

Taiwanese political scientist

Julie Yu-Wen Chen (Chinese: 陳玉文) is a professor of Chinese studies in the Department of Cultures at the University of Helsinki, Finland. She additionally holds the position of Asian studies coordinator within the same faculty. Trained as a political scientist, she specializes in International Relations and China. Her research focuses on an interdisciplinary approach to exploring China’s relations with the rest of the world, particularly in the Indo-Pacific region and the post-Soviet countries.

== Biography ==
Originally from Taiwan, Chen earned her Bachelor of Arts in Political Science from National Taiwan University, which included a year of exchange at Concordia University in Canada. Subsequently, she obtained a Master of Arts in International Relations and Diplomacy from Leiden University, in collaboration with The Netherlands Institute of International Relations, Clingendael. Finally, she completed her PhD in Social Sciences under the guidance of Gerald Schneider, an eminent political scientist at the University of Konstanz in Germany.

Following her postdoctoral research at the University of Konstanz in Germany and La Trobe University in Australia, she commenced her academic career at Academia Sinica in Taiwan, University College Cork in Ireland, and Nazarbayev University in Kazakhstan. In 2016, Chen was hired by the University of Helsinki as a professor of Chinese studies. She performed the dual role of developing Chinese studies as a new discipline at the university and leading the only Confucius Institute in Finland. Within the framework of the Confucius Institute system, it is common to have two directors. Chen served as the Finnish director, advocating for the interests of Finland in educational cooperation with China. Chen directed the institute from January 2016 to January 2023.

== Publications ==
Selected authored books

Chen, Julie Yu-Wen (2025) Global Knowledge Production about China. Leiden: Leiden University Press, 220 pp. (Free Online Open Access Version)

Chen, Yu-Wen (2014) The Uyghur Lobby: Global Networks, Coalitions and Strategies of the World Uyghur Congress. Abingdon: Routledge, 168 pp.

Chen, Yu-Wen (2007) 誰把地圖變裝了 Who have Played Tricks on Maps? Taipei: Acorn (Xiangshi) Publishing, 168 pp.

Selected co-edited books

Chen, Yu-Wen; Shih, Chih-Yu (2014/2015) Borderland Politics in Northern India. Abingdon: Routledge.

Shih, Chih-Yu; Chen, Yu-Wen (2012) Tibetan Studies in Comparative Perspective. Abingdon: Routledge.

Selected scientific papers

Leibold, James; Chen, Julie Yu-Wen (2025) Han-Centrism and Multiethnic Nation-building in China and Taiwan: A Comparative Study Since 1911. Nationalities Papers 53(5):983-1000.

Chen, Julie Yu-Wen (2022) Reconciling Different Approaches to Conceptualizing the Glocalization of the Belt and Road Initiative Projects, Globalizations 19(7):1165-1177.

Chen, Yu-Wen; Günther, Olaf (2020) Back to Normalization or Conflict with China in Greater Central Asia? Evidence from Local Students’ Perceptions. Special issue "Encounters after the Soviet Collapse: Chinese Presence in the Former Soviet Union Border Zone”, Problems of Post-Communism 67(3): 228-240.

Chen, Yu-Wen; Hao, Yu-Fan (2020) Czech Perception of the Rise of China: A Survey among University Students, Asia Europe Journal 18(1): 157-175.

Burkhanov, Aziz; Chen, Yu-Wen (2016) Kazakh Perspective on China, Chinese and Chinese Migration, Ethnic and Racial Studies 39(12): 2129-2148.

Chen, Yu-Wen (2013) Bringing a Network Perspective to Chinese Internet Studies: An Exploratory Analysis, Journal of Chinese Political Science 18(4): 355-374.

Chen, Yu-Wen; Yap, Ko-Hua, Lee, Joey Ying (2013) Tianditu: China’s First Official Online Mapping Service, Media, Culture & Society 35(2): 234-249.

Yap, Ko-Hua; Chen, Yu-Wen; Huang, Ching-Chi (2012) The Diaoyutai Islands on Taiwan’s Official Maps: Pre- and Post-1971, Asian Affairs: An American Review 39(2): 90-105.

Chen, Yu-Wen (2011) Quantitative Content Analysis of Chinese Texts?: A Methodological Note, Journal of Chinese Political Science 16(4): 431-443.
