= Evan Sanders =

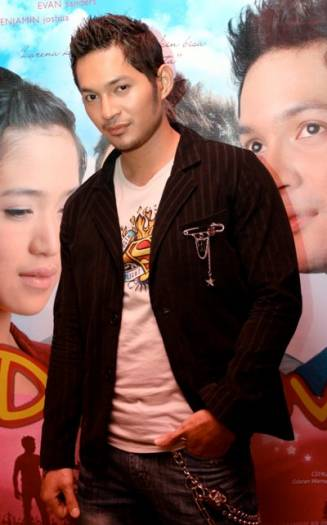
- Born: November 8, 1981 (age 44); Biak, Papua, Indonesia
- Occupations: Celebrity, actor, singer

Evan Sanders (born Stevanus Alexander Christopher Tenda; 8 November 1981 in Biak, Papua) is an actor and a singer. He was a VJ for MTV Indonesia. In August 2008 he released his first solo album, Unforgettable Sebelah Mata. A song Takkan Terluka Lagi was promoting this album. The new album is DUA MATA, New single "For Once In Our Life" soundtrack My Last Love the movie.

== Filmography ==
=== Film ===
Year	Film	Role	Language	Notes
2005	DeaLova	Ibel	Indonesian	Debut film
2006	Kuntilanak	Agung	Indonesian	
2007	Kuntilanak 2	Agung	Indonesian	
2011	My Last Love	Martin	Indonesian	
2013	Mengejar Setan	Andika	Indonesian	
2015	Sinaran	Andre	Malaysian/Indonesian	With Lisa Surihani, Izara Aishah, Sharif Sleeq & Nadia M. Din
2019	Roh Fasik		Indonesian	
