= Ruma Maida =

2009 Indonesian film directed by Teddy Soeriaatmadja

- Promotional poster
- Directed by: Teddy Soeriaatmadja
- Written by: Ayu Utami
- Produced by: P. Setiono; Teddy Soeriaatmadja
- Starring: Atiqah Hasiholan; Yama Carlos; Nino Fernandez; Frans Tumbuan
- Cinematography: Ical Tanjung
- Edited by: Waluyo Ichwandiardono
- Music by: Bobby Surjadi; Didit Saad; Naif
- Production companies: Lamp Pictures; Karuna Pictures
- Release date: 28 October 2009 (Indonesia)
- Running time: 90 minutes
- Country: Indonesia
- Language: Indonesian

Ruma Maida (released internationally as Maida's House) is a 2009 Indonesian film written by Ayu Utami, directed by Teddy Soeriaatmadja and starring Atiqah Hasiholan, Yama Carlos, Nino Fernandez, and Frans Tumbuan. It details a woman's struggle to save a historic house from a developer; it also shows the life of the house's original owner.

Work on what was to become Ruma Maida began in 2008, when Utami was approached by Lamp Pictures and asked to write a nationalism-themed script; she completed the task in six months, with input from Soeriaatmadja. After three months of pre-production, shooting began in Semarang, Central Java, and Kota, Jakarta. Editing took three months, after which the film – with a soundtrack by the band Naif and a song written by Utami – premiered on 28 October 2009, the anniversary of the 1928 Youth Pledge; it was later shown in film festivals in Singapore, Australia, and Italy.

Ruma Maida, which uses different filming styles for scenes in the past and present, deals with the importance of education, history, and pluralism. Critical reception to the film was mixed; reviewers praised the visuals but disapproved of the plot and dialogue. It was nominated for twelve Citra Awards at the 2009 Indonesian Film Festival, of which it won one.

== Plot ==
A young history student, Maida (Atiqah Hasiholan), a Christian, runs a free school for street children in Jakarta. The school is in a house that once belonged to Ishak Pahing (Nino Fernandez), a Christian Indo composer and pilot, and his Muslim wife Nani Kuddus (Imelda Soraya); Pahing wrote the song "Pulau Tenggara" ("The South-Eastern Island"), which inspired President Sukarno to help form the Non-Aligned Movement, while living in the house. As Maida learns about Pahing, she decides to write her undergraduate thesis about his life.

One day her class is interrupted by the young Muslim architect Sakera (Yama Carlos), who has been told to evict Maida's school by his employer, the developer Dasaad Muchlisin (Frans Tumbuan). As Maida and Sakera argue in the streets, rioting breaks out around them. Sakera protects the half-Chinese Maida, then tells her that he will help her keep the house, although it is scheduled to be demolished within a week.

After attempts to persuade Muchlisin to keep the original design fail, Sakera overhears that the house is on disputed land. Maida uses the information, as well as feedback from a traditional musical group distantly related to Pahing, to discover that the house has a secret underground bunker, in which she and Sakera – with whom she has begun to fall in love – find documents showing the history of the house. With the help of her mother's former lover Kuan (Henky Solaiman), she discovers the true ownership of the house.

Pahing, who had grown up within the nascent independence movement and associated with several historical figures, was arrested for being half-Dutch by the Japanese spy Maruyama (Verdi Solaiman) – a man who coveted Pahing's wife. After being tortured, Pahing was released to discover that his wife had been raped and killed; their newborn son Fajar had been kidnapped. Pahing later died on a flight carrying medical supplies over Yogyakarta when the flight was shot down. Meanwhile, his son was raised by Maruyama – the kidnapper – and had his name changed to Dasaad Muchlisin.

With this information, Maida, Sakera, and Kuan approach Muchlisin and tell him how the house features in his history. After a short silence, Muchlisin tells them to leave. Several months later, on Maida and Sakera's wedding day – when they are married at both a mosque and a church – Muchlisin comes to the church and says that he has abandoned his plans to demolish the house. Instead, he renovates the building and dedicates it as a school for street children.

== Cast ==
- Atiqah Hasiholan as Maida
- Nino Fernandez as Ishak Pahing
- Yama Carlos as Sakera
- Frans Tumbuan as Dasaad Muchlisin
- Henky Solaiman as Kuan
- Verdi Solaiman as Maruyama

== Production ==
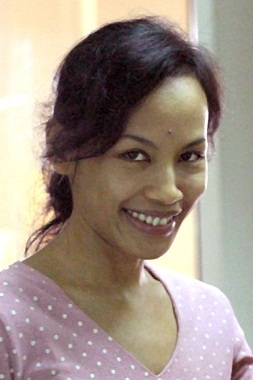
Ayu Utami wrote the script over a period of six months. Ruma Maida was her first screenplay.

The screenplay for Ruma Maida was written by Ayu Utami, her first such work; mainly known for her novels, she had avoided screenplays as she thought they were generally too commercially oriented. She wrote the screenplay over a period of six months beginning in 2008, when Lamp Pictures – which produced the film with Karuna Pictures – requested that she write a story about nationalism; according to the director Teddy Soeriaatmadja, who was brought in while the screenplay was still on its first draft, he and Utami read seven drafts of the screenplay before they agreed on the story. Considering the screenplay a way to encourage the younger generation to study Indonesian history, which she said could be fun, Utami decided to focus on education, diversity, and history.

Pre-production for Ruma Maida took three months. The characters were written without any particular actors in mind. Atiqah Hasiholan, who had previously starred in the Academy Award-submitted Jamila dan Sang Presiden (Jamila and the President, 2009), was cast as Maida. Yama Carlos, who played Sakera, was initially cast for another role but received the leading male role after a last-minute switch. The actor cast as Muchlisin, Frans Tumbuan, was the only one auditioned as Soeriaatmadja thought the role was perfect for him. Soeriaatmadja later recalled that, including extras, Ruma Maida had the largest cast of any film he had made to that point.

Shooting for the film was conducted in Kota, Jakarta, and Semarang, Central Java, over a period of one month. Soeriaatmadja later recalled that the most difficult scenes to shoot were those which happened in modern times, especially the riots; for set design, however, Indra Tamoron Musu found those that occurred in the past to be the most difficult, owing to the research necessary. The scenes at the house were shot separately; those occurring in 1998 were shot first and those occurring in the past were shot after the crew had spent a week renovating the house. Hasiholan later recalled that Soeriaatmadja was a controlling director who told the actors exactly what he wanted in a clear manner. However, cinematographer Ical Tanjung said that Soeriaatmadja was still open to feedback from the cast and crew. Editing, which was done by Waluyo Ichwandiardono, took another three months.

The Indonesian band Naif covered several songs for Ruma Maida's soundtrack, including songs from the 1940s such as "Juwita Malam" ("Beauty of the Night", by Ismail Marzuki), "Di Bawah Sinar Bulan Purnama" ("Under the Light of the Full Moon", by R. Maladi), and "Ibu Pertiwi" ("Motherland"). The covers were recorded over a period of five days. Utami wrote "Pulau Tenggara", which was sung by Imelda Soraya.

== Themes ==
Benny Benke, writing in Suara Merdeka, noted that the film was a "free interpretation of the formal Indonesian history, [a history] which is too arrogant, dominant, and dogmatic". (Note: Original: "... hasil interpretasi bebas atas sejarah resmi yang terlalu angkuh, mendominasi, sekaligus dogmatis.") He wrote that at times the line between fact and fiction was thin. Utami stated that people from the revolutionary period "believed in dreams" and had a "strong sense of heroism and patriotism", things which she believed Indonesia needed. Soeriaatmadja also noted that the film was meant to address issues of contemporary Indonesia, through the house's history. Assistant director Azhar Lubis described the house as a microcosm of Indonesia, implying that, if the country was not maintained, it would fall apart.

In Media Indonesia, Yulia Permata Sari wrote that Soeriaatmadja seemed to be promoting the need to remember and respect history through the plot and characterisations. The film showed "Indonesia Raya" composer W.R. Supratman, Japanese admiral Maeda, Vice President Mohammad Hatta, President Sukarno, and Prime Minister Sutan Sjahrir. Hasiholan considered the film a warning against repeating past mistakes.

Triwik Kurniasari, writing in The Jakarta Post, described the inclusion of the May 1998 riots and subsequent fall of Suharto as touching on pluralism issues. Utami, in an interview with the Jakarta Globe, stated that she had meant to show diversity by giving the characters different ethnic, religious, and socio-economic backgrounds, and later explained that the film was meant to show Indonesia's motto Bhinneka Tunggal Ika (Unity in Diversity) as it is applied in the country. Another reviewer, Dewi Anggraeni, wrote that Ruma Maida "paints a more realistic picture of Indonesia’s society, where people do not necessarily fit into neat social, racial or economic categories", with its characters not fitting into any traditional stereotypes.

== Style ==
Ruma Maida uses a sepia overlay and static camera for events happening in the past, with more natural tones and different angles for events in the present. Some plot points, such as the marriages between Ishak and Nani (top), as well as Sakera and Maida (bottom), run parallel.

Ruma Maida uses colours and shooting styles to indicate different time periods. Past events have a soft sepia overlay and are shot with a static camera, while those in 1998 have more natural tones and are shot with a handheld. The use of the handheld was meant to show the present in as "rough and non-sterile" (Note: Original: "... sekasar mungkin dan tidak steril.") a manner possible, while the past was meant to have a sweet, beautiful, and clean feeling; this played on the theme of romanticising the past. Events in Pahing's life are shown in flashbacks interspersed throughout Maida's struggle to retake the house. The film is paced slowly, and shots are taken from "unique" angles.

In Tempo magazine, Kurie Suditomo wrote that Ruma Maida intertwined several sub-plots, including the depiction of the 1928 Youth Conference, the education of street children, and a scene where Sakera discusses architecture with Muchlisin; the review stated that these detracted from the film's comprehensibility. Jakarta Globe reviewer Armando Siahaan noted that several plot lines run parallel, including riots following the Japanese surrender in 1945 and those in May 1998.

== Release and reception ==
Ruma Maida premiered on 28 October 2009, coinciding with events that celebrated the 1928 Youth Pledge – this release date was planned from early in production, because of the date's historical significance. It received a wide release on the following day. The film was screened at the Singapore International Film Festival in April 2010. That August Ruma Maida had three screenings in the "Education" category of the Indonesian Film Festival in Melbourne, Australia. In November it was screened at the Asiatica Film Mediale in Rome, Italy, under the title La Casa Di Maida.

Ruma Maida received mixed reception. Kurniasari described the film as "an enjoyable way to learn more about [Indonesia's] long history." Benke wrote that the film had good visuals, but the dialogue at times "went over viewers' heads". (Note: Original: "... berlarat-larat.") Sari called the cinematography well done, but found that the plot could confuse viewers. Suditomo thought that the film was well visualised but lost much of its impact owing to its extraneous subplots.

Anggraeni, covering the Indonesian Film Festival in Australia, described Ruma Maida as cleverly weaving the plot into Indonesia's independence struggle, although she felt that several plot twists "rather stretch[ed] the audience's imagination". Siahaan wrote that the film "may have limitations in its execution and presentation, but is highly commendable for its ability to raise social questions and delve into the nation’s history." The review in Republika suggested that the film may be too boring for the general public owing to its slow-moving plot.

The film was released on VCD and DVD in Indonesia on 14 July 2010 by EZY Home Entertainment, after passing through the censorship board in February. The DVD featured English-language subtitles and a behind the scenes documentary.

== Awards ==
Ruma Maida was nominated for twelve Citra Awards at the 2009 Indonesian Film Festival, winning one.

Award	Year	Category	Recipient	Result
Indonesian Film Festival	2009	Best Picture		Nominated
Indonesian Film Festival	2009	Best Director	Teddy Soeriaatmadja	Nominated
Indonesian Film Festival	2009	Best Original Screenplay	Ayu Utami	Nominated
Indonesian Film Festival	2009	Best Leading Actor	Yama Carlos	Nominated
Indonesian Film Festival	2009	Best Leading Actress	Atiqah Hasiholan	Nominated
Indonesian Film Festival	2009	Best Supporting Actor	Frans Tumbuan	Nominated
Indonesian Film Festival	2009	Best Supporting Actor	Verdi Solaiman	Nominated
Indonesian Film Festival	2009	Best Cinematography	Ical Tanjung	Nominated
Indonesian Film Festival	2009	Best Artistic Direction	Indra Tamoron Musu	Nominated
Indonesian Film Festival	2009	Best Editing	Waluyo Ichwandiardono	Nominated
Indonesian Film Festival	2009	Best Musical Direction	Bobby Surjadi, Didit Saad	Nominated
Indonesian Film Festival	2009	Best Sound Arrangement	Shaft Daultsyah, Khikmawan Santosa	Won
