= Yapto Soerjosoemarno =

Indonesian politician

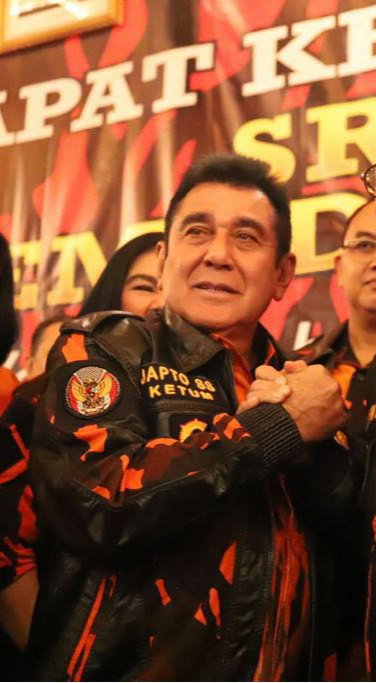
- Soerjosoemarno in 2018

Member of People's Consultative Assembly
- In office 1 October 1997 – 30 September 1999
- Parliamentary group: Groups Delegation

Leader of Pancasila Youth
- Incumbent
- Assumed office 1981

Personal details
- Born: 16 December 1949 (age 76) Surakarta, Central Java, Indonesia
- Party: Golkar (–2001); Patriot Party (2001–2011)
- Spouse: Retno Suciati
- Parent(s): Soetarjo Soerjosoemarno; Dolly Zegerius
- Relatives: Marini Soerjosoemarno (older sister)
- Occupation: Politician; lawyer

Yapto Soelistyo Soerjosoemarno (born 16 December 1949, in Surakarta, Central Java) is an Indonesian politician who is known as the leader of Pancasila Youth, an organization of quasi-official political gangsters that supported the New Order military dictatorship of Suharto, while also engaging in other lucrative but unofficial criminal acts. Pancasila Youth supported the 1965 transition to the New Order under Suharto, they ran death squads for the Indonesian army, murdering thousands of alleged communists across Indonesia, mainly in the province of North Sumatra.

== Early life ==
He was born 16 December 1949, in Surakarta, Central Java. His father, Ir. KPN. Soetarjo Soerjosoemarno, is a member of the Mangkunegaran Javanese nobility. Soerjosoemarno studied topography and geodesy. He finished his education at the Delft University of Technology in the Netherlands. His mother, Dolly Zegerius, was a naturalised Indonesian citizen of Jewish Dutch origin and a competitive contract bridge player who represented Indonesia at the Southeast Asian Games.

== Career ==
Yapto Soerjosoemarno is known as the leader of Pancasila Youth, an organization of semi-official political gangsters that supported the New Order military dictatorship of Soeharto. Pancasila Youth supported the 1965 transition to the New Order under Suharto They ran death squads for the Indonesian army, murdering thousands of alleged communists and Chinese Indonesians across the province of North Sumatra. The leaders of these death squads, Effendy Nasution, Jan Pahrum Lubis, Roshiman, and others selected Yapto to lead Pancasila Youth in 1980.Soerjosoemarno is the chairman of the Pancasila Youth and the Patriot Party. The Patriot Party maintains formal ties to the family of former Indonesian President Suharto. Yapto is also a lawyer and owns a law firm in South Jakarta, Indonesia.

Yapto also heads other 'youth gangs'.

On 12 March 2011, Yapto received a bomb disguised as a book named Apakah Masih Ada Pancasila (Does the Pancasila still exist?).

Soerjosoemarno appeared in the 2012 documentary The Act of Killing, which depicts his lifestyle and leadership of Pancasila Youth. He has threatened to sue the film's director or producers.

== Personal life ==
Yapto married Retno Suciati and has three children: Golda Nayawitri B.D.K, Sahid Abishalom B.N.N.S, and Jedidiah Shenazar K.S. His sister, Marini, and his niece, Shelomita, are active in the Indonesian entertainment industry. Both he and his family have had frequent brushes with the law and have been detained.

In February 2025, the Corruption Eradication Commission (KPK) disclosed that it had seized a total of Rp5.6 billion (approximately USD 370,000) from Yapto’s South Jakarta residence. During this operation, the KPK seized 11 vehicles, including models such as the Jeep Gladiator Rubicon, Land Rover Defender, Toyota Land Cruiser, Mercedes-Benz, Toyota Hilux, Mitsubishi Colt Diesel, and Suzuki. Additionally, authorities confiscated cash totaling approximately Rp 56 billion (around USD 3.7 million), comprising both Indonesian rupiah and foreign currencies. Various documents and electronic evidence were also seized. The investigation is part of gratification offenses involving former Kutai Kartanegara Regent Rita Widyasari, who was convicted in 2018.
