= Atiqah Hasiholan =

Indonesian actress and model (born 1982)

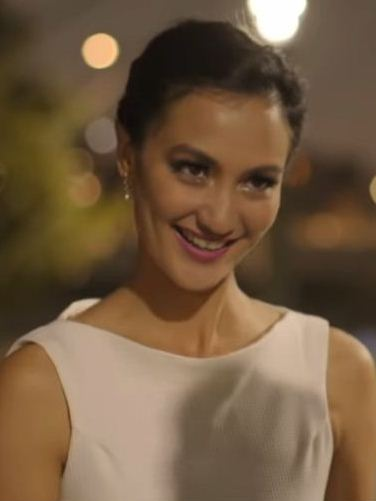
- Born: Atiqah Hasiholan Alhady; January 3, 1982 (age 44); Jakarta, Indonesia
- Education: Monash University
- Occupation: Celebrity
- Years active: 2006–present
- Spouse: Rio Dewanto (m. 2013)
- Children: Salma Jihane Putri Dewanto
- Parents: Achmad Fahmy Alhady (father); Ratna Sarumpaet (mother)

Atiqah Hasiholan Alhady (born 3 January 1982) is an Indonesian actress.

== Biography ==
Atiqah Hasiholan was born on 3 January 1982 to Achmad Fahmy Alhady, an Arab-Indonesian businessperson, and Ratna Sarumpaet, a Batak playwright. She has three elder siblings: Mohammad Iqbal Alhady, Fathom Saulina, and Ibrahim Alhady. As a child she wanted to be a lawyer.

Atiqah Hasiholan attended Monash University in Melbourne, Australia, where she studied media and psychology. On her summer holiday, she acted in her mother's theatre troupe, Satu Merah Putih Panggung; her enjoyment of the activity convinced her to become an actress. She made her feature film debut in Nia Dinata's 2006 film Berbagi Suami (Love for Share). She then played in several further films, including Suster N (Nurse N; 2007), Cinta Setaman (Love Potpurri; 2008) in which she played a prostitute and Pintu Terlarang (Forbidden Door; 2009).

In 2009, Atiqah Hasiholan starred in her mother's film Jamila dan Sang Presiden (Jamila and the President), in which she played a prostitute named Jamila who is convicted and eventually executed for killing a government minister. Initially Hasiholan viewed her character as a "regular slutty prostitute", but after thinking of the character more thoroughly and interviewing real-life sex workers, she considered Jamila a "victim of life". The film was submitted to the 82nd Academy Awards for Best Foreign Language Film, but not nominated.

After Jamila, Atiqah Hasiholan starred in Ruma Maida (Maida's House), directed by Teddy Soeriaatmadja. In the film she played a young university student who studies history through a house in Jakarta; Atiqah Hasiholan said the film "boosted her sense of nationalism". She played a prostitute for the third time 2010's Darah Garuda (Blood of the Garuda), a minor role. For the role, she also handled a gun, which she described as "so damn heavy". That same year, she played in the sex comedy Mafia Insyaf (Repentant Mafia).

Atiqah Hasiholan appeared in 2011, as the main character's mother in The Mirror Never Lies, directed by Kamila Andini. The film, about a Bajau family in Wakatobi, was intended to raise awareness about marine conservation. In June 2011, the short film "Payung Merah" ("Red Umbrella"), in which Atiqah Hasiholan played a woman with a red umbrella and love issues, won Best Asian Short Film at the ScreenSingapore festival. Later in 2011 she appeared in Arisan! 2, a sequel to the 2003 film Arisan!.

In late 2015, Atiqah Hasiholan played a motorcycle taxi driver Asna in NET sitcom OK-JEK. She accepted the role because it is her first role in a comedy TV series. She left the show after a year due to her pregnancy.

== Influences ==
In a 2011 interview with The Jakarta Post, Atiqah Hasiholan said that her mother was her greatest influence.

== Filmography ==
- Berbagi Suami (Love for Share; 2006)
- Suster N (Nurse N; 2007)
- Dicintai Jo (Loved By Jo; 2007)
- Cinta Setaman (Love Potpurri; 2008)
- Pintu Terlarang (Forbidden Door; 2009)
- Jamila dan Sang Presiden (Jamila and the President; 2009)
- Ruma Maida (Maida's House; 2009)
- Mafia Insyaf (Repentant Mafia; 2010)
- Darah Garuda (Blood of Eagles; 2010)
- The Mirror Never Lies (2011)
- Arisan! 2 (2011)
- Hello Goodbye (2012)
- Java Heat (2013)
- The Disposal (2013) - short film
- La Tahzan (2013)
- 2014 (2014)
- 3 Nafas Likas (2014)
- Cinta Selamanya (2015)
- Wonderful Life (2016)
- Mantan Manten (2019)
- Pariban: Idola dari Tanah Jawa (2019)
- Sembil9n (2019) - TV mini-series
- Edge of the World (2021)
- Stealing Raden Saleh (2022)

== Awards and nominations ==
Year	Award	Category	Recipients	Result
2009	Indonesian Film Festival	Citra Award for Best Leading Actress	Ruma Maida	Nominated
2011	Indonesian Film Festival	Citra Award for Best Supporting Actress	The Mirror Never Lies	Nominated
2012	Indonesian Film Festival	Citra Award for Best Leading Actress	Hello Goodbye	Nominated
2013	Indonesian Movie Awards	Best Chemistry (with Rio Dewanto)	Hello Goodbye	Nominated
2014	Maya Award	Best Actress in a Leading Role	Hello Goodbye	Nominated
2012	Maya Award	Best Actress in a Leading Role	3 Nafas Likas	Nominated
2014	Indonesian Film Festival	Citra Award for Best Leading Actress	3 Nafas Likas	Nominated
2015	Maya Award	Best Actress in a Supporting Role	2014: Siapa Di Atas Presiden?	Nominated
2016	Indonesian Film Festival	Citra Award for Best Leading Actress	Wonderful Life	Nominated
