= Zegerius =

Zegerius is a surname. Notable people with the surname include:

- Dilan Yesilgöz-Zegerius (born 1977), Dutch politician
- Dolly Zegerius (1925–2019), Indonesian athlete
