= Reuben Elishama =

Indonesian actor

- Born: Reuben Elishama Hadju Soerjosoemarno; 18 September 1978 (age 47); Jakarta, Indonesia
- Occupations: Actor; singer
- Years active: 2003–present
- Parents: Didi Abdulkadir Hadju; Marini Soerjosoemarno

Reuben Elishama Hadju Soerjosoemarno (born 18 September 1978) is an Indonesian actor and singer from the band Channel.

== Life and career ==
The son of a senior artist Marini and Didi Hadju initially had chosen profession as an office worker. But this younger brother of singer Shelomita was not able to deny his passion for singing. He later founded the band Channel.

Nia Dinata's bids to co-star in Arisan! (2003) was rejected by Reuben. Similarly, when offered to join again in Berbagi Suami. Through this film anyway, Reuben got the Best Male Supporting Actor Nominated Film Festival Indonesia 2006. Reuben then played in the movie Kangen (2007) as the main character with Bunga Citra Lestari.

On 14 May 2006, ahead of the Parfi's Congress to be held on 18–19 May 2006, congress organizers try to attract the sympathy of the young artist, by giving awards to young artists who come on the show Parfi Film Exposé & Parfi Award, held at the Hardrock Cafe. Reuben is one of the artists who received awards. In addition to Reuben, also participated in Tora Sudiro, Sauzan, Laudya Chintya Bella, Winky Wiryawan, Pretty Asmara, Fauzi Baadilla, Indra Bekti, Adinia Wirasti, Ivan, Marcella Zalianti, Nicholas Saputra, and Dennis Adhiswara.

Reuben (vocals) with Alfa (guitar), Mario (guitar), and Buggi (drums) formed the band Channel (band) in mid-2003 and had a hit soared through the "Tentang Kita" on their debut album Perjalanan Dua Insan (2006). So that Mario (guitar) and Buggi (drums) declared out and create his own band. So Reuben stayed with Alfa accompanied by two additional players who will soon release a second album.

== Filmography ==
- Arisan! (2003)
- Berbagi Suami (2006)
- Kangen (2007)
- Takut: Faces of Fear (2008) – Segmen The Rescue
- Sanubari Jakarta (2012)
- Veil (2023)

== Discography ==
- Perjalanan Dua Insan (2006) with the band Channel
