= Rieke Diah Pitaloka =

Indonesian actress, author, and politician

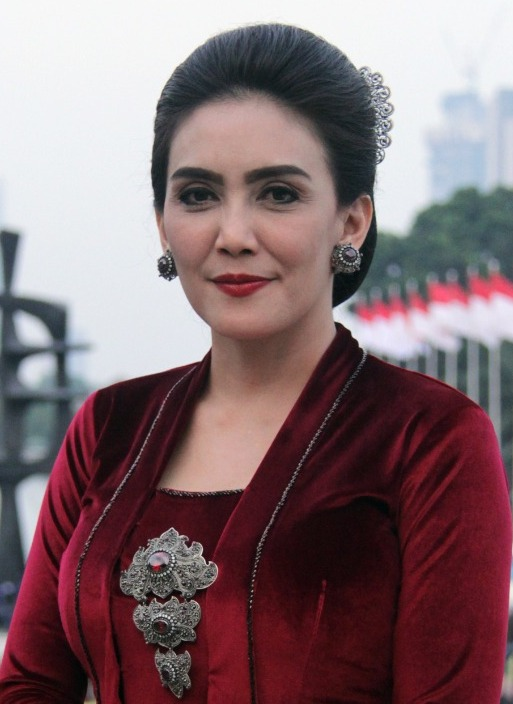
- Pitaloka in 2019

Member of the House of Representatives
- Incumbent
- Assumed office 1 October 2009
- Constituency: West Java II (2009–14); West Java VII (2014–present)

Personal details
- Born: Rieke Diah Pitaloka Intan Purnamasari; January 8, 1974 (age 52) Garut, West Java, Indonesia
- Party: PDI-P (since 2008)
- Other political affiliations: National Awakening (2000–2008)
- Spouse: Donny Gahral Adian (m. 2005; div. 2015)
- Children: 3
- Education: University of Indonesia
- Occupation: Politician; actress; author

Rieke Diah Pitaloka Intan Purnamasari or better known as Rieke Diah Pitaloka (born in Garut, West Java, Indonesia on January 8, 1974) is an Indonesian actress, author, and politician of Sundanese descent. She is currently serving as a member of the House of Representatives from the Indonesian Democratic Party of Struggle.

== Career ==
=== Acting career ===
Rieke rose to public prominence through a Sutra condom commercial featuring the phrase "meow." She is best known for her role as the ditzy "Oneng" in the sitcom "Bajaj Bajuri" (2002–2007). She made her big screen debut as Dwi, a woman in a polygamous marriage, in the 2006 film "Sharing a Husband."

She also dabbled in theater. She played in a theater performance entitled "Cipoa" by Putu Wijaya in 2007. She also played in an anthology film by four female directors entitled "Lotus Requiem", which was later titled "Women Have Stories" and aired in 2008.

=== Political career ===
Rieke is active in political activities, even serving as deputy secretary general of the DPP National Awakening Party led by Muhaimin Iskandar. Rieke then resigned from the Islamic mass-based party to join the Indonesian Democratic Party of Struggle led by Megawati Soekarnoputri.

Rieke is a member of the House of Representatives for the 2009–2014 period from the Indonesian Democratic Party of Struggle for the electoral district West Java II. In the House of Representatives, Rieke is a member of Commission IX. The area she pays close attention to is public health and welfare. She is a member of the Special Committee for the Draft Law on the Social Security Agency, which is part of the National Social Security System.

She founded a foundation called the Pitaloka Foundation, which works in the fields of literature and social work.

In early 2013, Rieke decided to run for Governor of West Java. accompanied by Teten Masduki, they called themselves PATEN and were nominated by the Indonesian Democratic Party of Struggle with candidate number 5.

On March 3, 2013, in the announcement of the results of the West Java Governor–Vice Governor Election, the gubernatorial–vice gubernatorial candidate pair number 5 Rieke-Teten ranked 2nd out of 5 candidate pairs with 5,714,997 votes or 28.41 percent of the valid votes.

== Personal life ==
Rieke married Donny Gahral Adian, a philosophy lecturer at the University of Indonesia, on Saturday, July 23, 2005, at her parents' home in Garut, West Java. They had a son in 2009, Sagara Kawani Hadiasyah.

On January 9, 2011, just one day after Rieke's 37th birthday, she gave birth to twin boys, Misesa Adiansyah and Jalumanon Badrika, via cesarean section.

She divorced Donny on January 13, 2015.

== Education ==
Pitaloka graduated from University of Indonesia with a bachelor's degree in Dutch literature. She also holds another bachelor's degree in philosophy from STF Driyakara. In 2007, she received master's degree in philosophy from University of Indonesia. The thesis she wrote for fulfilling graduate research requirement was published into a book called Kekerasan Negara Menular ke Masyarakat.

== Filmography ==
=== Movies ===
Year	Title	Role	Notes
2003	Gadis-Gadis Asrama		
2006	Berbagi Suami	Dwi	Segment: Cerita Siti
2007	Perempuan Punya Cerita	Sumantri	Segment: Cerita Pulau
2008	Laskar Pelangi	Ibu Ikal	
2009	Sang Pemimpi	Ibu Ikal	
2022	Before, Now & Then	Ningsih	
2025	Agen +62	Martha Husna	

=== Television series ===
- Impian Pengantin
- Srikandi
- Badut Pasti Berlalu
- Untukmu Segalanya
- 30 Meter
- Perawan-Perawan
- Perkawinan
- Prahara Prabu Siliwangi
- Goresan Cinta Berbingkai Duka
- Indahnya Rembulan Teriknya Matahari
- Air Mata Ibu
- Kemuning
- Panji Manusia Millenium
- Bajaj Bajuri
- Bola Kampung
- Maha Kasih

=== Television shows ===
==== As the host ====
- Hikmah Fajar (Episode: Catatan Sergap; RCTI)
- Book Review (MetroTV)
- Good Morning (Trans TV)
- Reportase Malam (Trans TV)
- Celebrity Update (TPI)

=== Theatre ===
- Extremities (2003)
- Cipoa (2007)

== Written works ==
=== Books ===
- Renungan Kloset: Dari Cengkeh Sampai Utrecht (2003)

== Awards and nominations ==
Year	Award	Category	Nominated work	Result
2006	Indonesian Film Festival	Best Supporting Actress	Sharing a Husband	Nominated
2006	Jakarta Film Festival	Best Supporting Actress	Sharing a Husband	Nominated
2010	Bandung Film Festival	Most Commended Supporting Actress in a Cinema	The Dreamer	Nominated

== Electoral history ==
Election	Position	Constituency	Political party	Number of votes	Election result
2009 Indonesian legislative election	House of Representatives	West Java II	PDI-P	Unknown data	Winning
2014 Indonesian legislative election	House of Representatives	West Java VII	PDI-P	255,044	Winning
2019 Indonesian legislative election	House of Representatives	West Java VII	PDI-P	169,279	Winning
2024 Indonesian legislative election	House of Representatives	West Java VII	PDI-P	94,201	Winning

Election	Position	Political party	Number of votes	Election result
2013 West Java gubernatorial election	Governor of West Java	PDI-P	5,714,997	Lost
