= Cinta (film) =

1975 film

Cinta (Love) is a 1975 Indonesian drama film directed and written by Wim Umboh. It stars Marini, Kusno Sudjarwadi, Ratno Timoer, Wahab Abdi and Komalasari.
