= Patriot Party (Indonesia) =

Patriot Party Partai Patriot
- Chairman: Yapto Soerjosoemarno
- Secretary-General: Nugroho Sulistyanto
- Founded: 1 June 2001; 25 years ago (as Pancasila Patriot Party); 2008; 18 years ago (as Patriot Party)
- Dissolved: 1 June 2011; 15 years ago
- Split from: Golkar
- Merged into: National Unity Party
- Headquarters: Jakarta
- Ideology: Pancasila; Anti-communism; Ultranationalism
- Political position: Far-right

Website

The Patriot Party (Indonesian: Partai Patriot) was a political party in Indonesia. It was established as the Pancasila Patriot's Party as a result of a deliberations at the sixth national conference of the Pancasila Youth (Indonesian: Pemuda Pancasila) organization in 1996. At the time, the organization's political goals were channeled by Golkar, but in its conference the year after the 1998 Fall of Suharto, Pancasila Youth withdrew from Golkar. The conference also decided the time was right to establish a political party, and it was declared on 1 June 2001, the anniversary of Sukarno's Pancasila speech. The party was officially and legally established two years later. Thus the Patriot Party was described as the political wing of the Pancasila Youth.

In the 2004 Indonesian legislative election, the party only won 0.9% of the popular vote and no seats. The party therefore had to change its name and undergo the ratification process by the General Elections Commission name to allow it to contest the 2009 elections. In the 2009 elections, the party only won 0.5 percent of the vote, less than the 2.5 percent electoral threshold, meaning it was awarded no seats in the People's Representative Council.

Following its poor result in the 2009 vote, the party joined nine other smaller parties to form the National Unity Party (Indonesian: Partai Persatuan Nasional), another short-lived party.

== Election results ==
=== Presidential election results ===
Election	Ballot number	Candidate	Running mate	1st round (Total votes)	Share of votes	Outcome	2nd round (Total votes)	Share of votes	Outcome
2004	1	Wiranto	Salahuddin Wahid	26,286,788	22.15%	Eliminated	Runoff		
2009	2	Susilo Bambang Yudhoyono	Boediono	70,997,833	53.15%	Elected			

=== Legislative election results ===
Election	Ballot number	Leader	Seats		Votes		Outcome of election
Election	Ballot number	Leader	No.	±	Total	%	Outcome of election
2004	21	Yapto Soerjosoemarno	0 / 550		1,073,139	0.95%	Opposition
2009	30	Yapto Soerjosoemarno	0 / 560	0	547,798	0.53%	Governing coalition
