= Veil (TV series) =

- Promotional poster
- Genre: Mystery; Drama
- Screenplay by: Jason Godfrey; M Mahfuz
- Story by: Jason Godfrey
- Directed by: M Mahfuz
- Starring: Cheryl Chitty Tan; Alan Wan; Lim Kay Tong; Cynthia Koh; Jeff Catz; Reuben Elishama; Rasathi; Danial Ashriq; Bella Putri
- Country of origin: Singapore
- Original language: English
- No. of seasons: 1
- No. of episodes: 8

Production
- Executive producers: Galen Yeo; Khim Loh
- Producer: Tay Chiao Rong
- Cinematography: Derrick Loo
- Editors: Alviss Cheu; Ngo Chu Ting
- Running time: approx. 41~46 minutes
- Production companies: Moving Visuals Co; Ying Group

Original release
- Network: Channel 5; meWATCH; Mediacorp Drama on YouTube
- Release: 6 February – 27 March 2023

Veil is a 2023 Singaporean mystery drama television series produced by Moving Visuals Co and Ying Group. It centres on a young woman who inherits a secluded estate after the mysterious death of her father, the estate's elusive occupants and also a secret monitoring system installed in the building. The series began airing on Mediacorp Channel 5 and meWATCH every Monday at 10pm from 6 February 2023.

== Cast ==
=== Main ===
- Cheryl Chitty Tan as Audrey
  - Natasha Lim as young Audrey
- Alan Wan as Tom
- Lim Kay Tong as Edward
- Cynthia Koh as Brenda
- Jeff Catz as Johnny
- Reuben Elishama as Jared
- Rasathi as Sharm
- Danial Ashriq as Ben
- Bella Putri as Chloe

=== Supporting ===
- Keagan Kang as Vincent "Vinnie" Lopez
- Sheila Wyatt as Mrs Xavier
- Johan Jaaffar as Dr. Tehrani
- Sunny Pang as Crime boss
- Teo Ser Lee as Liz
- Donovan as Junior
- Chai Wen Hao
- Tan Jie Hao
- Evan Tan
- Shue Jia

== Episodes ==
Episode	Title
1	"The Inheritance"
2	"Bad Neighbour"
3	"Moving Day"
4	"Dark Spirits"
5	"The Assistant"
6	"The Mourning After"
7	"Penance Owed"
8	"Raise The Veil"

== Production ==
Filming was completed in December 2022.
