= OK-JEK =

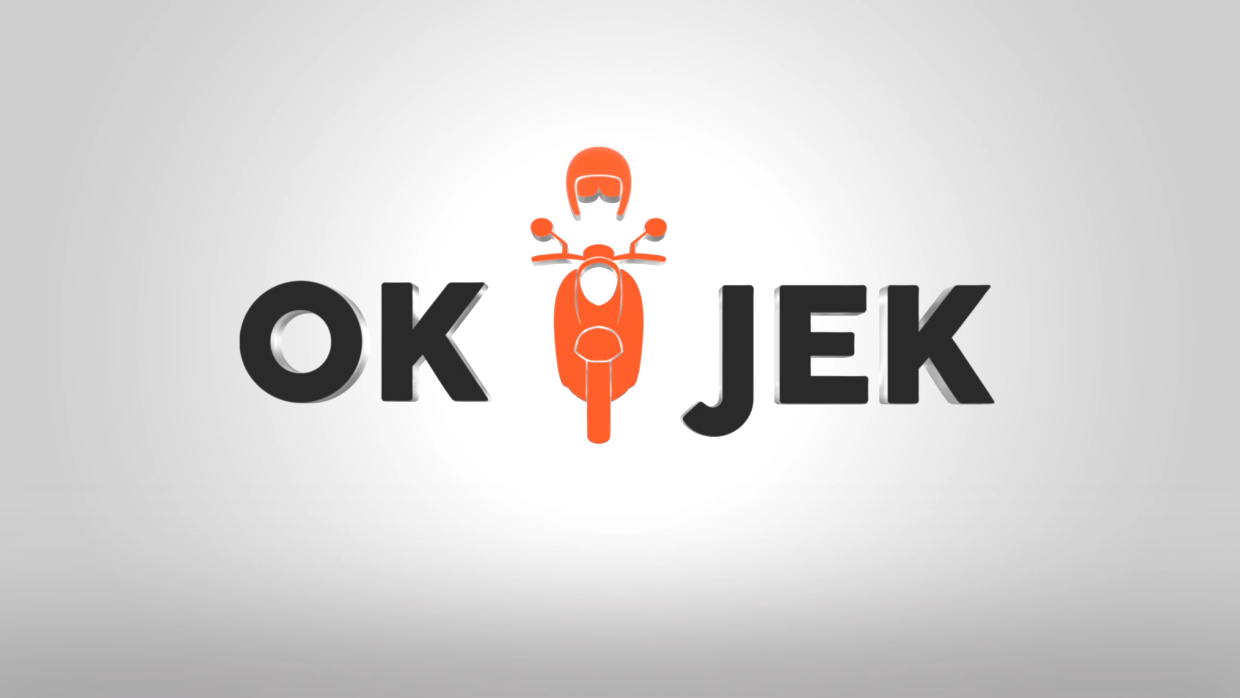
- Genre: Sitcom
- Directed by: Hilman Mutasi; Thomas Nawilis; Yogi Supra; Andri Gumilar
- Starring: Oka Antara; Atiqah Hasiholan; Ibnu Jamil; Abdul Adul; Jajang C. Noer; Girindra Kara; Baby Jovanca; Dodit Mulyanto; Dhianti Jusuf; Daniel G. Harahap; Niken Anjani; Inayah Wahid; Chika Waode; Richard Kyle; Oded Kravitz; Abdur Arsyad; Andi Annisa Iasyah; Arief Didu; Windy Apsari; Ben Joshua; McDanny; Nadine Alexandra; Abbas Aminu; Yusril Fahriza; Beddu; Mumuk Gomez; Arafah Rianti
- Country of origin: Indonesia
- Original language: Indonesian
- No. of seasons: 2
- No. of episodes: 610

Production
- Producer: Nucky Rozandy
- Editors: Richard Allen; Milton Krear
- Running time: 19–22 minutes (episode 1–70); 39–46 minutes (episode 71–610)
- Production company: Imagine

Original release
- Network: NET
- Release: 28 December 2015 – 16 May 2018

OK-JEK is an Indonesian television sitcom originally broadcast on NET. It ran for 610 episodes across two seasons, which aired from 2015 to 2018. Starring an ensemble cast, it revolves around the titular fictional on-demand motorcycle taxi (ojek) company. Story ideas were inspired by real-life experiences with such ojek services that the crew read on the Internet. OK-JEK has been noted for its promotion of safe driving and has been nominated for several awards, including Asian Television Awards for Best Comedy Programme.

== Premise ==
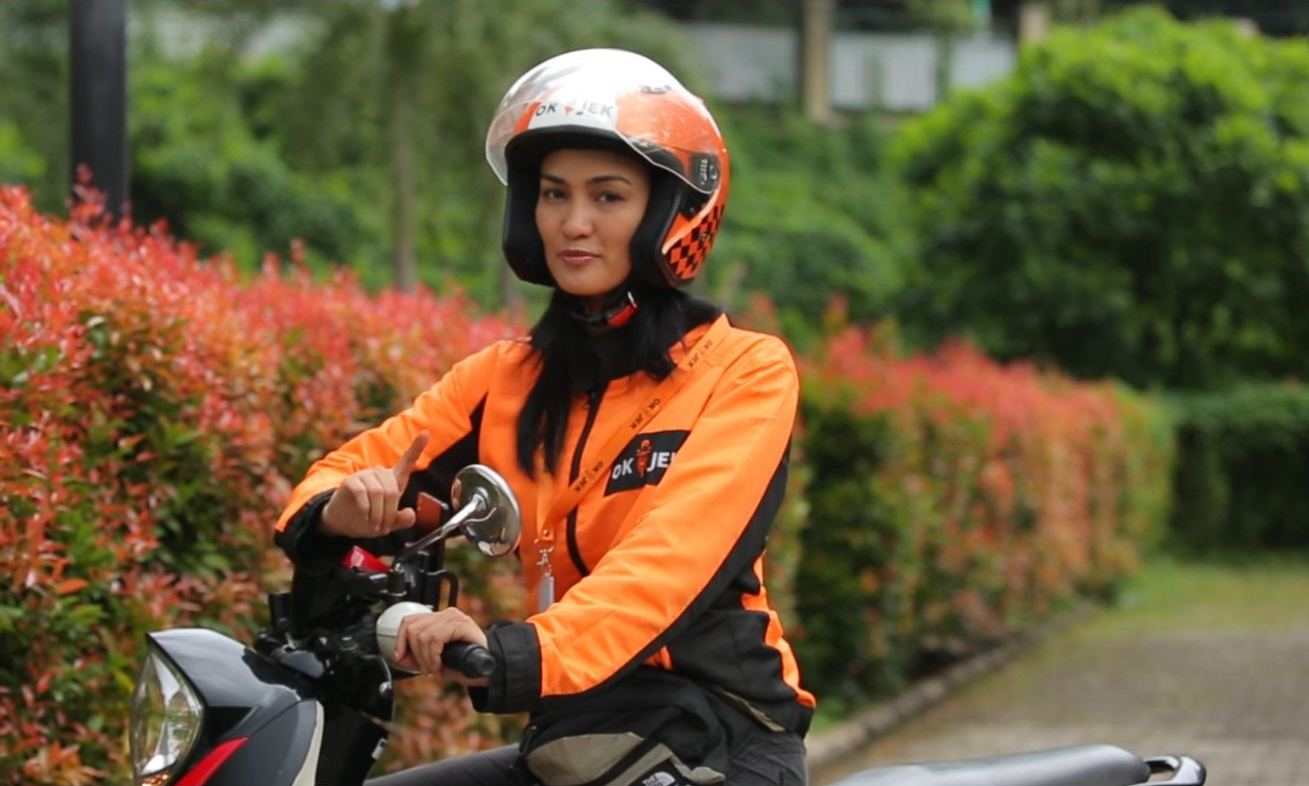
Asna (as portrayed by Atiqah Hasiholan) wearing OK-JEK jacket and helmet

The series revolves around the titular fictional company OK-JEK, which primarily offers on-demand motorcycle taxi service, known as online ojek in Indonesia. It follows the drivers' various experiences with their customers. As the series progress, other on-demand services such as cleaning service OK-CLEAN, makeup service OK-GLAM, and car taxi service OK-CAR are introduced. The main characters of the series are people working in OK-JEK and people related to them.

In the first season, OK-JEK is headed by Prima (Girindra Kara). OK-JEK drivers include Iqbal (Oka Antara), Asna (Atiqah Hasiholan), Seno (Ibnu Jamil), Mulyadi (Dodit Mulyanto), Sarah (Niken Anjani), Naya (Inayah Wahid), Shelly (Chika Waode), and Firman (Ben Joshua). Employees on other services include Beta (Abdur Arsyad) of OK-CLEAN and Didu (Arief Didu) of OK-GLAM. After OK-CAR is introduced, its first drivers include Didu and Amira (Nadine Alexandra). Other employees who work on the head office include customer service representative Ade (Baby Jovanca), logistics worker Pricilla (Windy Apsari), human resources manager Fahrul (McDanny), and Abbas (Abbas Aminu). Main characters working outside of the company include Iqbal's friend and stand-based ojek driver Opang (Abdul Adul), Iqbal's mother (Jajang C. Noer), Mulyadi's wife Mawar (Dhianti Jusuf), Mulyadi's son Boni (Daniel G. Harahap), another conventional ojek driver Oded (Oded Kravitz), and Mawar's tenant Nurul (Andi Annisa Iasyah).

At the start of the second season, the remaining main characters are Prima, Seno, Sarah, Naya, Shelly, Firman, Beta, Amira, Abbas, Oded, and Nurul. Prima resigns from her position and is replaced by Naya. Oded and Nurul gets married and moves to an apartment, followed by Oded joining OK-JEK. In the middle of the season, Ade and Iqbal return after long absences and become Naya's assistant and an OK-CAR driver respectively. New OK-JEK employees introduced during the season include Iyus (Yusril Fahriza), Banu (Beddu), Mumu (Mumuk Gomez), and Arafah (Arafah Rianti).

== Production ==
=== Development ===
Producer Roan Y. Anprira is credited with coming up for the premise of OK-JEK. Roan said that he got idea from reading interesting stories in motorcycle taxi reviews when traveling in Bali. For subsequent story ideas, producer Nucky Rozandy said that they asked fans for real-life experiences with motorcycle taxi on OK-JEK social media and turned them into the sitcom plots.

=== Cast ===
Atiqah Hasiholan played Asna from the start of the series. The role required her to learn how to drive a motorcycle for the first time. Atiqah left the show after a year due to her pregnancy.

Stand-up comedian Dodit Mulyanto was cast as Mulyadi early in the series. Dodit's stand-up comedy persona as an expressionless person with distinctive Javanese accent is incorporated into his character.

=== Filming ===
As a stripped series, filming was done almost every day. The schedule usually began at 8 a.m. to replicate actual Jakarta daily life. Filming was often done on the streets with the actors wearing jacket, helmet, and long pants, which was noted by Atiqah Hasiholan to be hot for them. Both Atiqah and Dodit said that experiencing the struggles of ojek driving made them appreciate and empathize with ojek driver more.

== Broadcast ==
Season	Episodes	Originally released	
Season	Episodes	First released	Last released
1	402	December 28, 2015	July 14, 2017
2	208	July 17, 2017	May 16, 2018

== Reception ==
Satya Wacana Christian University's Gamaliel Gumilar Kusuma and Rini Darmastuti analyzed that OK-JEK educates the audience on how to ride safely, use online motorcycle taxi services, work professionally, give customer services, responding customer complains, and facilitating customers. On 23 March 2017, OK-JEK received an award from the chief of the Indonesian National Police, Tito Karnavian, for promoting traffic rules.

=== Accolades ===
Award	Year	Category	Nominee	Result	Ref.
Asian Television Awards	2016	Best Comedy Programme	OK-JEK	Nominated	
Bandung Film Festival	2016	Commendable Television Series	OK-JEK	Nominated	
Bandung Film Festival	2016	Commendable Television Series Actor	Oka Antara	Nominated	
Panasonic Gobel Awards	2017	Comedy Programme	OK-JEK	Nominated	
