= Sri (1999 film) =

Sri is a 1999 Indonesian film directed by Marselli Sumarno. It was Indonesia's submission to the 72nd Academy Awards for the Academy Award for Best Foreign Language Film, but was not accepted as a nominee.

== Plot ==
Sri is a village girl married to Hendro, a 70-year old Javanese aristocrat. When Hendro falls ill, she has to nurse him back to health and negotiates with the God of Death not to take him away.

== Cast ==
- Rini Ariyanti as Sri
- Sardono W. Kusumo as Yamadipati
- R.M.T. Ronosuripto as Hendro
- Niniek L. Karim as Laksmi

== See also ==
- Cinema of Indonesia
- List of Indonesian submissions for the Academy Award for Best International Feature Film
