= Dolly Zegerius =

Indonesian athlete (died 2019)

- Born: 26 July 1925; Netherlands
- Died: 18 September 2019 (aged 94); Jakarta, Indonesia
- Citizenship: Indonesian
- Spouse: Soetarjo Soerjosoemarno (m. 1943)
- Children: 3, including Soemarini and Yapto

Dolly Zegerius (26 July 1925 – 18 September 2019) was a Dutch-born Indonesian who played contract bridge.

== Early life ==
Zegerius was born on 26 July 1925 in the Netherlands and was raised in Huizen and Amsterdam. She came to Indonesia on 1 January 1947, where she met the Kobus sisters during their trip, who held a charity concert together with her when Nazi Germany surrendered to the Allies.

== Personal life ==
Zegerius was married to the retired Major General Soetarjo Soerjosoemarno from 1943 until his death on 17 June 1997. They had three children; Narjo, who died in infancy, Marini, who is a singer, and Yapto Soerjosoemarno, leader of the far-right paramilitary organization Pancasila Youth.

== Death ==
Zegerius died at the age of 94 at Medistra Hospital in Jakarta on 18 September 2019.

== Literature ==
- Janssen, Hilde; Enkele reis Indonesië: vier Amsterdamse vrouwen in hun nieuwe vaderland; 2009; Nieuw Amsterdam publishing; ISBN 9789046819265.
