= Ratna Sarumpaet =

Indonesian human rights activist and filmmaker

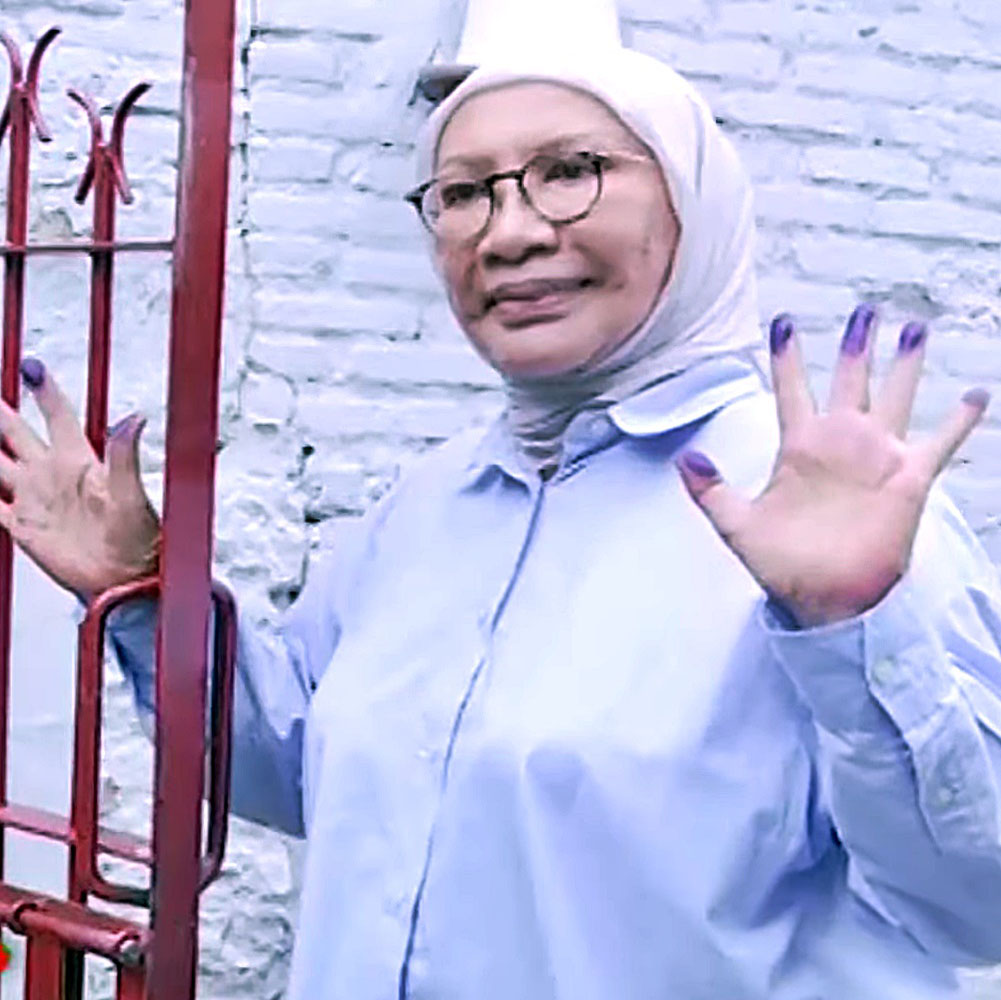
- Born: 16 July 1949 (age 77); Tarutung, North Tapanuli, North Sumatra, Indonesia
- Education: University of Indonesia
- Occupations: Director, actress, screenwriter, political activist
- Years active: 1969–2018
- Notable work: Jamila dan Sang Presiden
- Spouse: Achmad Fahmy Alhady (m. 1972; div. 1985)
- Children: Mohamad Iqbal; Fathom Saulina; Ibrahim; Atiqah Hasiholan
- Parents: Saladin Sarumpaet (father); Julia Hutabarat (mother)

Ratna Sarumpaet (born 16 July 1949) is an Indonesian human rights activist, theatrical producer, actress, film director, and writer. In July 2019, she was sentenced to two years in jail for spreading hoaxes.

Sarumpaet, born into a politically active Christian family in North Sumatra, initially studied architecture in Jakarta. After seeing a play by Willibrordus S. Rendra in 1969, she dropped out and joined his troupe. Five years later, after marrying and converting to Islam, she founded the Satu Merah Panggung; the troupe did mostly adaptations of foreign dramas. As she became increasingly concerned about her marriage and unhappy about the local theatre scene, two years later Sarumpaet left her troupe and began to work in television; she only returned in 1989, after divorcing her abusive husband.

The murder of Marsinah, a labour activist, in 1993 led Sarumpaet to become politically active. She wrote her first original stageplay, Marsinah: Nyanyian dari Bawah Tanah (Marsinah: Song from the Underground), in 1994 after becoming obsessed with the case. This was followed by several other politically charged works, several of which were banned or restricted by the government. Increasingly disillusioned by the autocratic acts of Suharto's New Order government, during the 1997 legislative elections Sarumpaet and her troupe led pro-democracy protests. For one of these, in March 1998, she was arrested and jailed for seventy days for spreading hatred and attending an "anti-revolutionary" political gathering.

After her release, Sarumpaet continued to participate in pro-democracy movements; these actions led to her fleeing Indonesia after hearing rumours that she would be arrested for dissent. When she returned to Indonesia, Sarumpaet continued to write politically charged stageplays. She became head of the Jakarta Art Board in 2003; two years later she was approached by UNICEF and asked to write a drama to raise awareness of child trafficking in Southeast Asia. The resulting work served as the foundation for her 2009 feature film debut, Jamila dan Sang Presiden (Jamila and the President). This film was submitted to the 82nd Academy Awards for Best Foreign Language Film but not nominated. The following year, she released her first novel, Maluku, Kobaran Cintaku (Maluku, Flame of My Love).

== Background and early career ==
Sarumpaet was born on 16 July 1949 in Tarutung, North Tapanuli Regency, North Sumatra. She was the fifth of ten children born to Saladin Sarumpaet, Minister of Defence in the Revolutionary Government of the Republic of Indonesia rebel government, and Julia Hutabarat, a women's rights activist. Both were also prominent in the Christian community. Three of her siblings – Mutiara Sani, Riris Sarumpaet, and Sam Sarumpaet – are members of the Indonesian art community. As a teenager, she moved to Jakarta to study there, finishing her high school studies at PSKD Menteng. In his biography, her classmate Chrisye recalled that Sarumpaet was very confident; he noted that she enjoyed writing poetry and then reading it in a loud voice while other students were engaging in other activities.

By 1969 she was studying architecture at the University of Indonesia. It was at this time that she saw a performance of Kasidah Berzanji (The Berzanji Chant) by a troupe led by Willibrordus S. Rendra, which convinced her to drop out of university and join the troupe. In 1974 she founded Satu Merah Panggung Theater, which performed adaptations of foreign works such as the Rubaiyat of Omar Khayyam and William Shakespeare's Romeo and Juliet and Hamlet – in the latter, Sarumpaet played the titular role.

Sarumpaet became interested in Islam in her teenage years but only converted around 1974 after marrying Achmad Fahmy Alhady, an Arab-Indonesian. Together they had four children: Mohammad Iqbal Alhady, Fathom Saulina, Ibrahim Alhady, and Atiqah Hasiholan. Atiqah is also an actress and would later star in her mother's film Jamila.

In 1976, Sarumpaet, who was suffering domestic violence at home and discouraged by the market, left the theatre and entered the film industry. After her divorce, which took several years and required records of her broken ribs to satisfy the religious courts, she returned to theatre in 1989 with a performance of Shakespeare's Othello. Sarumpaet began working as a director in 1991, with the television serial Rumah Untuk Mama (House for Mother), which was broadcast on the state-owned television station TVRI. That same year, she adapted Antigone, a tragedy by French writer Jean Anouilh, in a Batak setting.

== Political theater ==
Sarumpaet's first original stageplay, Marsinah: Nyanyian dari Bawah Tanah (Marsinah: Song from the Underground), was performed in 1994 despite a sponsor abandoning the project near the showing date. The stageplay was based on the 1993 murder of Marsinah, a labour rights leader from East Java, and explored issues of political repression. The murder sparked a period of political activity for Sarumpaet. According to Barbara Hatley in Inside Indonesia, Sarumpaet was obsessed with the case, including seeing Marsinah's face while writing. Sarumpaet later reported that the way the murder was conducted, with Marsinah raped and mutilated, then discarded in a forest, "symbolised the deep, trivialising contempt which men, especially powerful men, feel towards women who dare to speak out".

After Marsinah, Sarumpaet and Satu Merah Panggung performed several other politically themed dramas, including Terpasung (Chained; 1995), about male dominance and violence against women, and Pesta Terakhir (The Last Party; 1996), about the funeral of a dictator without any mourners. In 1997, after the Marsinah case was closed due to contaminated DNA evidence, Sarumpaet released Marsinah Menggugat (Marsinah Revolts; 1997), a monologue in which Marsinah describes her murder. The play was banned in three cities. During the 1997 elections, Sarumpaet and her troupe performed with a coffin labeled "Democracy". For their action, they were arrested and held for twenty-four hours.

On 11 March 1998, Sarumpaet and eight others were arrested during a gathering held in concurrence with a meeting of the People's Consultative Assembly, in which she and the gathered persons sang the national anthem "Indonesia Raya" and "Padamu Negeri" ("To You, My Country") in front of security forces. The government had banned political meetings of more than five people earlier that month. Six of those arrested were brought up on charges, including Sarumpaet, who was charged with spreading hatred and attending an "anti-revolutionary" political gathering. Her pre-trial motion complaining about irregularities in the arrest, including the lack of a warrant, was dismissed by the court; a judge on the case commented that "singing 'Indonesia Raya' and '[Padamu Negeri]' is proof of their political crime". She was sentenced to 70 days in prison on 20 May – equal to her time served – then released. A day after her release, President Suharto resigned, bringing an end to the New Order.

== Post-Suharto work ==
After her release, Sarumpaet continued to be active in pro-democracy groups; she also wrote another play, Sang Raja (The King). Towards the end of 1998, with the political situation in Indonesia increasingly unstable and Sarumpaet rumoured to be wanted for stirring up dissent, she fled to Europe via Singapore. In December 1998, the Tokyo-based Asia Foundation for Human Rights awarded Sarumpaet the Female Human Rights Special Award.

By 2002 Sarumpaet had returned to Indonesia, where she debuted a stageplay entitled Alia, Luka Serambi Mekah (Alia, Wound of Serambi Mekah) at Ismail Marzuki Park in Jakarta; it was her first stageplay since the fall of Suharto. Dealing with Indonesian military operations in Aceh, the play was later performed in five other cities. In December 2002 it was scheduled to be broadcast on TVRI in commemoration of Human Rights Day, but pulled at the last minute due to intervention from the military. In 2001, she and her troupe put on Dalam Kegelapan Panjang (In a Long Darkness), which dealt with the children of victims of the anti-communist purges of 1965–1966.

In 2003, Sarumpaet was selected to head the Jakarta Art Board (Dewan Kesenian Jakarta), a position which she held until 2006. Two years after her selection, Sarumpaet was approached by UNICEF and asked to do a survey of child trafficking in Southeast Asia and promote awareness of the problem. After discovering the extent of the problem, she wrote Pelacur dan Sang Presiden (The Prostitute and the President), spending six months interviewing prostitutes in Surabaya, Surakarta, Garut, and Borneo in preparation. The play was shown in five different cities in 2006 and received warmly. Also in 2006, Sarumpaet organised the seventh triannual Women's Playwright International Conference in Bali.

After Pelacur, Sarumpaet began working on a film adaptation entitled Jamila dan Sang Presiden (Jamila and the President). The film's production took three years, due in part to a lack of funding; the total budget was Rp.6.5 billion (US$800,000) Released on 30 April 2009, the film was well received both domestically and internationally. It was submitted to the 82nd Academy Awards for Best Foreign Language Film, but not nominated.

Sarumpaet released her first written work of fiction on 10 December 2010, in commemoration of Human Rights Day. Entitled Maluku, Kobaran Cintaku (Maluku, Flame of My Love), the novel is about the love of a Christian woman and Muslim man set amidst the Maluku sectarian conflict; it delves into the causes of the conflict, including poverty and provocation by the armed forces.

== Politics ==
On 23 July 2008, while Jamila was in production, Sarumpaet nominated herself as an independent presidential candidate in the 2009 elections. She attempted to raise funding by selling "stocks" in her campaign through Akar Indonesia, established especially for the campaign; according to Sarumpaet, the technique was meant to show that people who were not wealthy could run for president. She did not make it to the ballot after the Constitutional Court of Indonesia ruled that independent candidates are not allowed to run.

In June 2014, Sarumpaet was upset by a Time magazine article that criticized a music video with Nazi overtones made by Indonesian rock singer Ahmad Dhani in support of 2014 presidential candidate Prabowo Subianto and his running mate Hatta Rajasa. The article, headlined "This Indonesian Nazi Video Is One of the Worst Pieces of Political Campaigning Ever", was written by reporter Yenni Kwok. On Twitter, Sarumpaet accused Kwok of humiliating Indonesia by making a false report on a survey on CNN. She also mentioned Kwok's Chinese ethnicity and her former address and posted a photo of Kwok and her child. Kwok said Sarumpaet's actions went "beyond bullying" and asked her to remove the photo or face legal action. Sarumpaet subsequently deleted the photo.

=== 2016 treason arrest ===
On the morning of 2 December 2016, Sarumpaet was arrested at a Jakarta hotel on suspicions of being part of a group allegedly plotting a coup against President Joko Widodo's administration. She was released the following day.

=== 2018 false assault claim ===
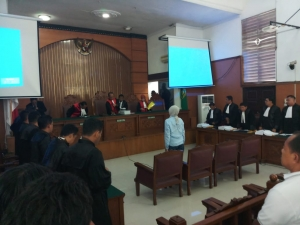
Ratna Sarumpaet appears in court on 2 April 2019

In September 2018, Sarumpaet posted a photo showing her bruised face which went viral online, claiming that she was assaulted by unknown assailants at the Husein Sastranegara International Airport in Bandung where she claimed to be attending an international conference. This resulted in prominent opposition figures, including Prabowo Subianto, publicly condemning the "cowardly attack". Subsequent police investigations found that she was not at the airport during the alleged time, and was instead in a plastic surgery clinic in Jakarta.

Soon afterward, she admitted that her claims were lies and that she made up the assault story to hide the plastic surgery from her family. She was also quoted as saying that she is "the best hoax creator". She was then fired from Prabowo Subianto's 2019 election campaign team, with Prabowo publicly apologizing for amplifying her claims. On 4 October 2018, she was apprehended at Soekarno-Hatta International Airport, where she was about to fly to Chile to attend an international conference, with Jakarta's Tourism Agency funding her. She is suspected of violating Article 28 of the Electronic Information and Transactions Law for allegedly spreading fake news. According to police, Ratna paid for the plastic surgery from the same bank account that had been used to collect money for the victims of the June 2018 Lake Toba ferry disaster. State prosecutors in May 2019 recommended she be jailed for six years. On 11 July 2019, she was sentenced to two years in jail for deliberately spreading false information to create a public disturbance. After receiving sentence remissions in connection with Indonesian Independence Day and the Muslim holiday of Idul Fitri, she was granted parole and released on 26 December 2019, having served almost 15 months of her 2-year sentence. After leaving jail, she claimed she had been punished for "criticizing the government" and said her criticism was merely an expression of love for the country.

Despite claims that she would actively criticize the Joko Widodo administration after her release, she instead retracted herself from public appearances. Due to her case, she lost her reputation and credibility as a human rights activist and was disgraced by her former political allies.

On 18 April 2022, she returned to public appearance by appearing on Deddy Corbuzier's podcast. She revealed that she deliberately made the hoax to hide her facial surgery from her child as well as to take people's emotional and political situations to gain significant attention and popularity. Despite admitting her fault, she did not feel guilty and remained unapologetic, even becoming permissive with hoax-making. Her stances were immediately rebuked by Deddy during the podcast.
