= Love for Share =

Berbagi Suami
- Poster
- Directed by: Nia Dinata
- Written by: Nia Dinata
- Produced by: Elza Hidayat; Claud Kunetz; Constantin Papadimitriou
- Starring: Jajang C. Noer; Shanty; Dominique Agisca Diyose; El Manik; Tio Pakusadewo; Lukman Sardi; Nungki Kusumastuti; Ria Irawan; Ira Maya Sopha; Winky Wiryawan; Rieke Diah Pitaloka; Reuben Elishama; Atiqah Hasiholan; Janna Soekasah; Melissa Karim
- Cinematography: Ipung Rahmat Syaiful
- Edited by: Yoga Krispatama
- Music by: Aghi Narottama; Bemby Gusti; Ramondo Gascaro
- Production companies: Kalyana Shira Films; WallWorks
- Distributed by: Kalyana Shira Films
- Release date: March 23, 2006
- Running time: 105 minutes
- Country: Indonesia
- Language: Indonesian

Love for Share (Indonesian: Berbagi Suami) is a 2006 Indonesian film directed by Nia Dinata. It tells three interrelated stories. It was submitted to the 79th Academy Awards as Indonesia's official submission for the Best Foreign Language Film, but was not nominated. The film received Golden Orchid Award as Best Foreign Language Film at the Hawaii Film Festival in 2007.

The film tells the intersecting stories of three women: Salma is a gynecologist who questions the morality of polygamy. But as a faithful Muslim, she accepts her polygamous husband, despite the problems he causes. Siti is a village girl who gets tricked into a polygamous household in a Jakarta slum. Ming is a beautiful young waitress who becomes the mistress of a married man to further her ambitions.

== Plot ==
The film is divided into three stories, for the characters of Salma, Siti, and Ming.

Salma (Jajang C. Noer) is a doctor, and her husband, Mr. Haji Ali Imron (El Manik) is a big businessman who is involved in politics and has taken two young wives, Indri (Nungki Kusumastuti) and Ima (Atiqah Hasiholan). Deep down, Salma herself does not like her husband's habits, but she prefers to remain silent. Salma's son Nadim (Winky Wiryawan), who is now an adult, is the reason Salma tolerates her polygamous life though Nadim instead comes to opposes it. Ali has a stroke and is paralyzed. Nadim is then looking after Ali at home, hears his father's last message urging him not to take more than one wife. At the funeral, it turns out that Ali had taken a fourth wife (Laudya Chintya Bella).

Siti (Shanty) is a Javanese girl who was brought from her village to Jakarta by her Mr. Lik (Lukman Sardi). Siti's desire to go to Jakarta was to take a beauty course. Back in her village, Mr. Lik always acted as if he was an important person in the film industry in Jakarta because of the photos of Mr. Lik with famous actors, though in reality, he was just a film studio driver with a mediocre salary. Siti had to face reality when she was married to her Mr. Lik who already had two wives, Sri (Ria Irawan) and Dwi (Rieke Diah Pitaloka). Siti then was forced to slow down her dreams by taking care of Sri and Dwi's many children. When Mr. Lik was sent to Aceh for documentary coverage of the tsunami there, Siti and Dwi developed a lesbian relationship and became determined to leave the house with two of the children. Siti, who had not yet become pregnant, took Sri to an obstetrician who told her that Sri had gonorrhea due to her husband. A few days after Mr. Lik returned from Aceh with a new wife named Santi, creating even more strain in the household. Then later one day, in the early hours of the morning, Dwi and Siti left by taxi to start a new life.

Ming (Dominique) is a 19-year-old girl who works at a duck restaurant by Koh Abun (Tio Pakusadewo), the chef and owner of the restaurant. Koh Abun has a wife named Cik Linda (Ira Maya Sopha) who is the restaurant's financial manager and is considered by Koh Abun to bring him good luck. Ming's beauty fascinates many men, including Koh Abun and Ming's friend Firman (Reuben Elishama), who is an aspiring film director. Koh Abun intends to marry Ming, but does not dare to tell Cik Linda the truth. Ming was given an apartment and a car, and begins to pursue her dream of becoming an actress. While Ming was immersed in her household life after Cik Linda went to America to visit her children, Firman came to Ming and invited her to the casting for his first feature film, which she initially resists but then attends the casting. Koh Abun refuses to stay with her when his wife returns and then Ming gets confronted by Cik Linda and her children after they returned from America. In the confrontation, she passes out. She decides to leave her apartment and return to her former neighborhood, dropped off by the same taxi driver that picks up Dwi and Siti from the previous chapter.

== Cast ==
- Jajang C. Noer as Salma
- Shanty (singer) as Siti
- Dominique Agisca Diyose as Ming
- El Manik as Mr. Haji Ali Rohim
- Tio Pakusadewo as Koh Abun
- Lukman Sardi as Mr. Lik
- Nungki Kusumastuti as Indri
- Ria Irawan as Sri
- Ira Maya Sopha as Cik Linda
- Winky Wiryawan as Nadim
- Rieke Diah Pitaloka as Dwi
- Reuben Elishama as Firman
- Atiqah Hasiholan as Fatima
- Janna Soekasah as Santi
- Melissa Karim as Cik Linda's daughter

=== Cameos ===
- Ikke Nurjanah as herself
- Lula Kamal as Dr. Lula
- Alvin Adam as Dr. Joko
- Dewi Irawan as Professor Opponent of Polygamy
- Maudy Koesnaedi as Talkshow Presenter
- Laudya Cynthia Bella as the fourth wife
- Aming as taxi driver
- Erwin Parengkuan
- Wak Ujang
- Yuanita Christiani as Cik Linda's daughter
- Ronny P. Tjandra as Koh Afung
- Rusdi Rukmarata as acting coach

== Soundtrack ==
OST. Berbagi Suami is a compilation album released under the label Aksara Records in 2006 to accompany the film. Musicians on the album include the indie rock group Sore.
