= The Mirror Never Lies =

- Theatrical poster
- Directed by: Kamila Andini
- Screenplay by: Kamila Andini; Dirmawan Hatta
- Produced by: Nadine Chandrawinata; Garin Nugroho
- Starring: Atiqah Hasiholan; Reza Rahadian; Gita Novalista
- Cinematography: Ipung Rachmat Syaiful
- Edited by: Wawan I Wibowo
- Music by: Thoersi Argeswara
- Production company: SET Film
- Release date: 26 April 2011 (Indonesia)
- Running time: 100 minutes
- Country: Indonesia
- Languages: Bajau; Indonesian

The Mirror Never Lies (also known by the Indonesian name Laut Bercermin, meaning The Ocean Reflects) is a 2011 Indonesian film directed by Kamila Andini and co-produced by Andini's father, Garin Nugroho, and former Puteri Indonesia Nadine Chandrawinata. Starring Gita Novalista, Atiqah Hasiholan, and Reza Rahadian, it follows a young Bajau girl named Pakis who has lost her father at sea and uses mirrors to unsuccessfully search for him. It has several interpretations, including as a coming-of-age story and as an environmentalist piece.

Filmed over a period of two months after nearly three years of research, The Mirror Never Lies was sponsored in part by the Indonesian branch of the World Wide Fund for Nature and the Wakatobi regency government. The first feature film to star the Bajau, it used their language extensively. The film received positive appraisals from film critics domestically. Furthermore, it has been screened at many international film festivals and won several awards both inside and outside of Indonesia. Critical reviews have generally been positive, mostly emphasising the film's visuals.

== Plot ==
Pakis (Gita Novalista) is a young girl from a fishing community of the Bajau people in Wakatobi, Sulawesi, part of the Coral Triangle. She lives with her mother, Tayung (Atiqah Hasiholan). As Pakis' father has been lost at sea, Tayung works hard to support her daughter. Pakis, however, is determined to search for her father, a quest which brings the two into conflict. Pakis regularly visits a local shaman, who conducts a ritual allowing Pakis to search for her father in a mirror's surface. The ritual never shows Pakis his location but she remains determined to keep trying. Meanwhile, Tudo (Reza Rahadian) has broken up with his fiancée. Struggling to cope with the loss, he takes a new job in Wakatobi studying dolphins. There he becomes involved with the Bajau community, staying at Tayung's home. Eventually Pakis is able to realise that her father is dead and continues with her life.

== Production ==
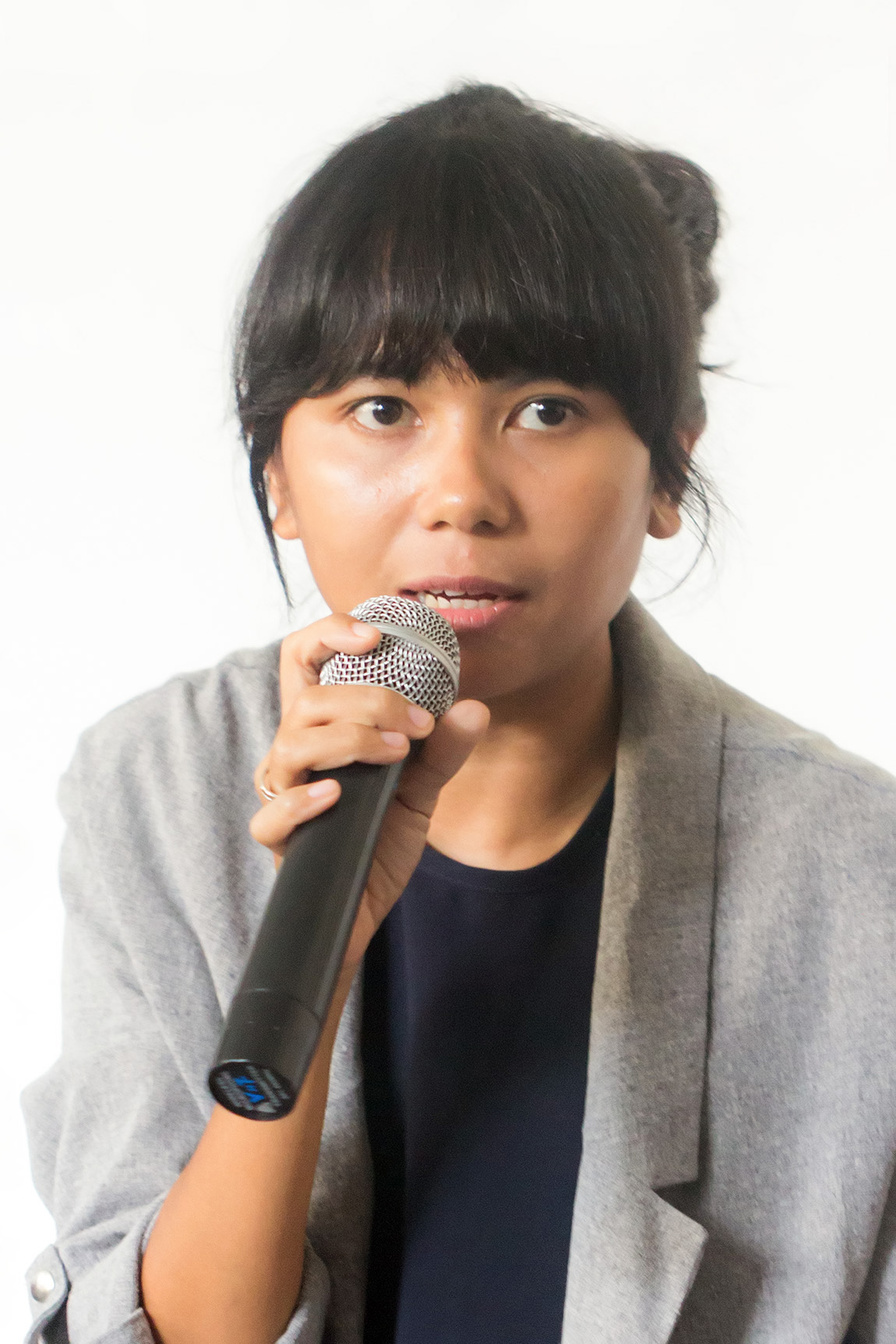
Kamila Andini, director of The Mirror Never Lies

The film was directed by Kamila Andini, who also wrote the script and, in collaboration with Dirmawan Hatta, the screenplay. For her feature film debut, Andini chose to write about the sea – a topic which had long interested her and on which she had previously recorded documentaries. She had also had a long-held interest in environmental issues. It was produced by former Miss Indonesia, Nadine Chandrawinata, together with Andini's father, the director Garin Nugroho. Andini has stated that she only consulted with her father and that he was not directly involved in the production, while Chandrawinata described herself as assistant producer, with Nugroho in charge. Artistic direction was handled by Timothy D Setyanto, with costumes by Retno Ratih Damayanti and make-up by Erwin Wijaya. Cinematography was completed by Ipung Rachmat Syaiful. Editing was handled by Wawan I Wibowo, while Thoersi Argeswara provided music and Khikmawan Santosa provided sound effects.

The Mirror Never Lies was a collaboration between the Indonesian branch of the World Wide Fund for Nature, the Wakatobi regency government, and SET Film Workshop, with the former two providing funding. It focused on the Bajau people, (Note: Also written Bajaw and Bajo) also known as "sea gypsies" for their nomadic maritime lifestyle. Little Indonesian-language documentation was available to the crew, and as such production took over two years, most of which was research. Andini later recalled that the crew had to "go directly to Wakatobi back and forth to get to know everything about the [Bajau] tribe". Originally planned for the second quarter of 2010, shooting was further delayed until September owing to an extended rainy season. Unlike most contemporary Indonesian films, which are often completed in a matter of days, the crew shot on site over a period of two months. They faced poor weather, including typhoons and large waves, and had difficulty manoeuvring over the wooden walkways and bridges used by the Bajau.

The film cast three Bajau teenagers, Gita Novalista, Eko and Zainal, in their feature film debuts; the three were the first Bajau to play in a feature film. More experienced actors, including Atiqah Hasiholan and Reza Rahadian (who had received two Citra Awards), were also cast. Hasiholan later stated that it had been her most challenging role yet, citing the cultural differences between the Bajau and what she was familiar with as well as her unprecedented need to act as a mother. In preparing for their roles, Hasiholan exercised slicing and dicing fish, while Rahadian went to Ancol in North Jakarta to learn about dolphins.

The Mirror Never Lies uses the Bajau language heavily, with its Indonesian spoken in a Bajau accent and, in domestic screenings, Indonesian-language subtitles when Bajau is spoken. The use of pre-recorded music is minimal. Instead, much of the film's soundtrack consists of "folk songs and chanting" in Bajau. Hasiholan had to undergo tutoring to learn her lines, learning from the Bajau people on location.

== Themes ==
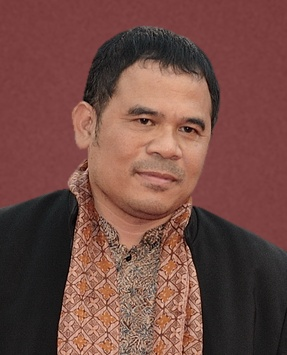
Producer Garin Nugroho said the film was to remind Indonesians of their maritime heritage.

In a 2012 interview Andini stated that she considered The Mirror Never Lies and the Bajau people symbols of unity; she expressed that the sea should not separate the different ethnic groups in the nation, but serve to connect them. Likewise, in an interview with Antara Nugroho stated that the film was intended to remind Indonesians that theirs is a maritime nation, which has influenced the country's culture. The regent of Wakatobi, Hugua, added in an interview with the Indonesian newspaper Kompas that Indonesian films had historically only presented land based cultures.

Triwik Kurniasari, writing for The Jakarta Post, considered the film a criticism of "destructive fishing practices and climate change" in Wakatobi; she believed that this is shown through the director's "respect for the environment" in the film. Writing for Kompas, Teguh Prayoga Sudarmanto noted that such a theme is representative of realities faced by Bajau fishermen, who must travel ever further as the fish supplies diminish. He further suggested that the film depicts the sea as capable of both friendliness and hostility, a force with which the Bajau must deal every day. The critic Lisabona Rahman, writing for the Indonesian film database filmindonesia.or.id, contrasted The Mirror Never Lies with the plot of "tourist" ("turis") films: unlike in such films, where a city-dweller changes the traditional lifestyle in a village, Tudo is able to adjust himself to village life and follow their ways.

Benny Benke, writing for the Semarang-based Suara Merdeka, drew a parallel between The Mirror Never Lies and Samuel Beckett's play Waiting for Godot. He suggests that they both have the same message: that awaiting somebody who never comes is ultimately futile. Benke further suggests that the film is centred around the conflict between the "utopian" Pakis and her "realistic" mother. Meanwhile, Maggie Lee, reviewing in The Hollywood Reporter, considered the film more of a coming-of-age story, with Pakis "discovering her womanhood just when the most significant man in her life is gone". Lee also noted Pakis' burgeoning sensuality and "nascent physical stirrings" for her friend Tudo. Ultimately, Lee suggested that Andini was expressing her desire to "break away from her father' [sic] artistic influence and swim alone" through the film.

== Release and reception ==
The Mirror Never Lies was premiered at the XXI Cineplex at FX Life Style in Jakarta on 26 April 2011, followed by a wide release on 5 May 2011. According to Lisa Siregar of The Jakarta Globe, the film was one of the first to document the Bajau people, including several of their rituals..

Puput Puji Lestari, writing for the Indonesian entertainment website KapanLagi.com, praised The Mirror Never Lies, concluding that it was "highly recomended" [sic] and that, despite some scenes which were out of focus, it "showed its quality from the first minute". (Note: Original: "... langsung menunjukkan kualitasnya sejak menit pertama.") Kurniasari considered the performances by the Bajau youth well done and praised the visuals as a "sneak peak into the beauty of Wakatobi". She found, however, that the film had several events with unclear motives. Lee likewise praised the film's "breathtaking underwater cinematography" and Novalista's performance, considering the youth's performance "convincingly embodying the uncertainties of a girl on the brink of adolescence". She found some faults in the film, including its ecological message which made "some scenes look rather Discovery Channel" and the "artificial" manner in which traditional songs were included in the film. Siregar also praised the visuals, writing that "every frame of the film is filled with the natural beauty of Wakatobi" and that The Mirror Never Lies would likely attract tourists to the islands.

Writing for Tempo magazine, Nunuy Nurhayati found that Andini had "done pretty well" (Note: Original: "... lumayan berhasil") with the film, praising its storyline and the children's acting. She considered the film's main strength to be the "beauty and uniqueness of Wakatobi's panoramas" (Note: Original: "Keunikan dan keindahan panorama Wakatobi ...") and wildlife. Benke found that the film was full of symbolism, similar to the works of Nugroho; Benke stated, however, that The Mirror Never Lies much easier to decipher than works by Andini's father. Rahman gave the film six out of ten. She praised Hasiholan and Novalista's performances, but found Rahadian's to be lacking. Although admitting the technical difficulties in filming on-site, she wrote that the cinematography could have been better.

The film was screened at numerous international film festivals, including the Busan International Film Festival in Korea, the Vancouver International Film Festival in Canada, the Mumbai Film Festival in India, the Tokyo International Film Festival in Japan (where it received a special mention), the Seattle International Film Festival in the US, and the Melbourne International Film Festival in Australia. It was one of two Indonesian films screened at the 2012 Berlin International Film Festival, playing to full cinemas in the Generation category; Kompas reported that it was recommended viewing for German schoolchildren at the time.

== Awards ==
The Mirror Never Lies has won several awards in both domestic and international film festivals. Before its domestic release, it won a special mention from the Global Film Initiative for its aesthetics and cultural content. For her directorial debut, Andini won a "Bright Young Talent Award" at the 2011 Mumbai Film Festival. At that year's Indonesian Film Festival the film was nominated for eight Citra Awards, winning two. It lost four, including Best Film, to Ifa Isfansyah's Sang Penari (The Dancer; 2011), while Hanung Bramantyo's ? (2011) surpassed The Mirror Never Lies for cinematography.

At the 2012 Bandung Film Festival The Mirror Never Lies received four awards from a total of ten nominations. At the 2012 Asia Pacific Screen Awards, it was one of two Indonesian works to compete, winning a single award from a single nomination. That year the film competed at the Asian Film Awards, receiving nominations for Best Cinematographer and Best Newcomer. The former award was ultimately captured by Chin Ting-chang of Seediq Bale (2011), while the latter was taken by Ko Chen-tung of You Are the Apple of My Eye (2011).

Award	Year	Category	Recipient	Result
Mumbai Film Festival	2011	Bright Young Talent Award	Kamila Andini	Won
Indonesian Film Festival	2011	Best Film	–	Nominated
Indonesian Film Festival	2011	Best Director	Kamila Andini	Nominated
Indonesian Film Festival	2011	Best Screenplay	Kamila Andini, Dirmawan Hatta	Nominated
Indonesian Film Festival	2011	Best Original Story	Kamila Andini	Won
Indonesian Film Festival	2011	Best Cinematography	Ipung Rachmat Syaiful	Nominated
Indonesian Film Festival	2011	Best Music Arrangement	Thoersi Argeswara	Won
Indonesian Film Festival	2011	Best Leading Actress	Gita Novalista	Nominated
Indonesian Film Festival	2011	Best Supporting Actress	Atiqah Hasiholan	Nominated
Bandung Film Festival	2012	Best Film	–	Won
Bandung Film Festival	2012	Best Director	Kamila Andini	Won
Bandung Film Festival	2012	Best Screenplay	Dirmawan Hatta	Nominated
Bandung Film Festival	2012	Best Leading Actor	Reza Rahadian	Nominated
Bandung Film Festival	2012	Best Leading Actress	Atiqah Hasiholan	Nominated
Bandung Film Festival	2012	Best Cinematography	Ipung Rahmat Syaiful	Won
Bandung Film Festival	2012	Best Artistic Direction	Tonny Trimarsanto and Tomy D. Setyanto	Won
Bandung Film Festival	2012	Best Music	Thoersi Argeswara	Nominated
Bandung Film Festival	2012	Best Editing	Wawan I. Wibowo	Nominated
Bandung Film Festival	2012	Best Poster	–	Won
Asia Pacific Screen Awards	2012	Best Children's Feature Film	Garin Nugroho and Nadine Chandrawinata	Won
Asian Film Awards	2012	Best Newcomer	Gita Novalista	Nominated
Asian Film Awards	2012	Best Cinematographer	Ipung Rachmat Syaiful	Nominated

== Works cited ==
- "6th AFA Nominees and Winners". Hong Kong: Asian Film Awards. Archived from the original on 20 July 2012.
- Aguslia (31 October 2011). "Kamila Andini Bersinar di Film Festival Bombay" [Kamila Andini Shines at the Bombay Film Festival]. Tempo (in Indonesian). Archived from the original on 19 February 2013.
- "Atiqah Hasiholan Finds Bajo Dialect Difficult". The Jakarta Post. 27 April 2011. Archived from the original on 30 April 2011.
- "Atiqah Hasiholan: Terlalu Banyak Kegelisahan di Negeri Ini..." [Atiqah Hasiholan: Too Much Restlessness in this Country...]. Kompas (in Indonesian). 19 April 2011. Archived from the original on 23 January 2013.
- Benke, Benny (21 January 2012). "Membaca Tradisi" [Reading Tradition]. Suara Merdeka (in Indonesian). Archived from the original on 4 April 2012.
- "FAQ (Tanya-Jawab)". Official Website for The Mirror Never Lies. Jakarta: WWF Indonesia. Archived from the original on 17 February 2013.
- Febriani, Prih Prawesti (31 October 2011). "Atiqah Hasiholan Belajar Potong Ikan" [Atiqah Hasiholan Learns to Cut Fish]. Tempo (in Indonesian). Archived from the original on 19 February 2013.
- Fikri, Ahmad (13 May 2012). "'Mirror Never Lies' Jawara Festival Film Bandung" ['Mirror Never Lies' Champion of the Bandung Film Festival]. Tempo (in Indonesian). Archived from the original on 5 April 2013.
- Herman, Ami (27 April 2011). "Nadine Chandrawinata Belajar Jadi Produser" [Nadine Chandrawinata Learning to be a Producer]. Suara Karya (in Indonesian). Archived from the original on 16 February 2013.
- "Kabar Baik dari Berlin untuk Indonesia" [Good News from Berlin for Indonesia]. Kompas (in Indonesian). 21 February 2012. Archived from the original on 24 February 2012.
- "Kredit The Mirror Never Lies" [Credits for The Mirror Never Lies]. filmindonesia.or.id (in Indonesian). Jakarta: Konfidan Foundation. Archived from the original on 7 April 2014.
- Kurniasari, Triwik (18 December 2011). "A Vibrant Year for the Film Industry". The Jakarta Post. Archived from the original on 8 January 2012.
- Kurniasari, Triwik (15 May 2011). "Kamila Andini : Filming Close to the Heart". The Jakarta Post. Archived from the original on 15 September 2011.
- Kurniasari, Triwik (16 January 2011). "Reza Rahardian: Young Actor with Many Faces". The Jakarta Post. Archived from the original on 11 November 2014.
- Kurniasari, Triwik (1 May 2011). "Wakatobi's Alluring Beauty". The Jakarta Post. Archived from the original on 7 October 2012.
- Lee, Maggie (7 October 2011). "The Mirror Never Lies: Busan Film Review". The Hollywood Reporter. Archived from the original on 5 November 2012.
- Lestari, Puput Puji (29 April 2011). "'The Mirror Never Lies', Laut Itu Cermin Besar" ['The Mirror Never Lies', Laut Itu Cermin Besar]. KapanLagi.com (in Indonesian). Jakarta. Archived from the original on 22 November 2012.
- "Nominasi Festival Film Bandung 2012" [Nominations for 2012 Bandung Film Festival]. KapanLagi.com (in Indonesian). Jakarta. 1 May 2012. Archived from the original on 13 April 2013.
- Nurhayati, Nunuy (8 May 2011). "Karena Cermin Tak Pernah Berdusta" [Because a Mirror Never Lies]. Tempo (in Indonesian). Archived from the original on 19 February 2013.
- "Penghargaan Tanda Tanya" [Awards for Tanda Tanya]. filmindonesia.or.id (in Indonesian). Jakarta: Konfidan Foundation. Archived from the original on 23 March 2015.
- "Penghargaan The Mirror Never Lies" [Awards for The Mirror Never Lies]. filmindonesia.or.id (in Indonesian). Jakarta: Konfidan Foundation. Archived from the original on 7 April 2014.
- Rahman, Lisabona (5 May 2011). "Langkah Pertama Yang Mengesankan Walau Tertatih" [An Impressive First Step, Although Falling Short]. filmindonesia.or.id (in Indonesian). Jakarta: Konfidan Foundation. Archived from the original on 5 April 2014.
- Siregar, Lisa (29 April 2011). "Reflecting on the Lives of the Bajo". Jakarta Globe. Archived from the original on 16 February 2013.
- Sudarmanto, Teguh Prayoga (26 April 2011). "Tiga Anak Suku Bajo Main Film" [Three Bajau Children Play in a Film]. Kompas (in Indonesian). Archived from the original on 23 August 2011.
- "The Mirror Never Lies". filmindonesia.or.id (in Indonesian). Jakarta: Konfidan Foundation. Archived from the original on 1 September 2013.
- "The Mirror Never Lies". Melbourne: Melbourne International Film Festival. Archived from the original on 17 January 2013.
- "The Mirror Never Lies". Seattle: Seattle International Film Festival. Archived from the original on 13 June 2012.
- "'The Mirror Never Lies' Kisah Suku Bajo dan Terumbu Karang" ['The Mirror Never Lies' Story of the Bajo and Coral Reefs]. Antara (in Indonesian). 27 April 2011. Archived from the original on 28 December 2011.
- Webb, Cynthia (17 October 2012). "Kamila Andini: Two Indonesian Films Compete in the APSA 2012". The Jakarta Post. p. 23. Archived from the original on 19 October 2012.
