= Jamila dan Sang Presiden =

2009 film by Ratna Sarumpaet

- Promotional poster
- Directed by: Ratna Sarumpaet
- Written by: Ratna Sarumpaet
- Produced by: Ratna Sarumpaet; Raam Punjabi
- Starring: Atiqah Hasiholan; Christine Hakim; Eva Celia Latjuba; Dwi Sasono; Fauzi Baadila; Surya Saputra
- Cinematography: Shamir
- Edited by: Sastha Sunu
- Music by: Thoersi Argeswara
- Distributed by: Satu Merah Panggung; MVP Pictures
- Release date: 30 April 2009
- Running time: 87 minutes
- Country: Indonesia
- Language: Indonesian
- Budget: Rp.6.5 billion (US$800,000)

Jamila and the President (Indonesian: Jamila dan Sang Presiden) is a 2009 Indonesian film directed and written by Ratna Sarumpaet and starring Atiqah Hasiholan and Christine Hakim. It follows the story of a prostitute sentenced to death for killing a government minister.

The film was adapted from a stage play entitled Pelacur dan Sang Presiden (The Prostitute and the President), which Sarumpaet had written after receiving a grant from UNICEF to study child trafficking trends in Indonesia and promote awareness of the problem. In preparing the script, she spent several months interviewing prostitutes in several cities; the film itself spent three years in production and featured much of the same cast and crew as the original play.

Released on 30 April 2009, the film received mixed to positive reception in Indonesia. Internationally the film featured in several film festivals and won awards in France, Italy, and Taiwan. It was submitted to the 82nd Academy Awards for Best Foreign Language Film, but not nominated.

== Plot ==
Jamila and the President opens with narration from Jamila (Atiqah Hasiholan), a victim of human trafficking, followed by several scenes showing her living a glamorous yet unfulfilling night life. After hearing a news report that a government minister, Nurdin (Adjie Pangestu), has been murdered, Jamila surrenders herself to the police. This surprises her would-be boyfriend, Ibrahim (Dwi Sasono), who feels badly for Jamila and begins working towards freeing her. Under the orders of the president, Jamila is placed in a prison outside Jakarta, where she receives rough treatment at the hands of the guards and warden, Ria (Christine Hakim).

In the prison, Ria reads Jamila's diary and learns her backstory. Jamila was sold by her mother to a middleman, who then sold her to a rich family. While living with the family, Jamila is raped by both the father and son in succession; Jamila kills the son and runs away, while the mother (Jajang C. Noer), aware of their actions, kills her husband. Jamila becomes a worker at a market, but once again must escape when she learns that some local men plan to rape her. She escapes to a discothèque, and when it is raided by the police she is thought to be a prostitute and arrested. After being released, Jamila is raised by a kind-hearted prostitute named Susi (Ria Irawan), who was also caught in the raid.

In the present day, several groups are demanding that Jamila be given the death sentence. One male guard, (Surya Saputra), takes pity on Jamila and tries to help her. However, Jamila ignores him. Ria, although slowly becoming more sympathetic to Jamila, gets into an argument with her over Nurdin's murder; this results in Jamila being placed in isolation.

Several days later, the court finds Jamila guilty of murder and sentences her to death, a sentence which will be carried out in 36 hours. Ria visits Jamila in her cell to check on her, and Ria explains that she intends to ask the president for a stay. Jamila refuses, then tells Ria about her experience looking for her sister Fatimah in Borneo, how she killed the man who had put Fatimah in a brothel but was unable to find her sister.

The day before Jamila's execution, Ibrahim meets with Susi, who tells him about Jamila's romantic involvement with Nurdin. Jamila became pregnant with Nurdin's child and insisted that he take responsibility, but instead Nurdin told her he was marrying someone else and humiliated her in public. When the two met in a hotel, Nurdin threatened Jamila with a pistol; in self-defence, Jamila killed him with the pistol. In the modern day, Jamila walks towards her execution; the president has not responded to the request for stay. The screen fades to black as a gunshot goes off, and afterwards, statistics about child trafficking and prostitution are shown.

== Production ==
Jamila and the President was directed by Ratna Sarumpaet, a women's rights activist. The film, Sarumpaet's directorial debut, was based on a theatrical drama she had previously made entitled Pelacur dan Sang Presiden (The Prostitute and the President), which was put on in 2006 in five cities by Satu Merah Panggung Theatre Troup. She was inspired write the story in 2005 after UNICEF approached her to do a survey of child trafficking in Southeast Asia and promote awareness of the problem. While writing the original script, Sarumpaet interviewed prostitutes in Surabaya, Surakarta, Garut, and Borneo over a period of six months. This research carried over into the film.

Sarumpaet cast her daughter, Atiqah Hasiholan, in the lead role. Initially Hasiholan viewed her character as a "regular slutty prostitute", but after thinking of the character more thoroughly, she considered Jamila a "victim of life". To better play her character, Hasiholan visited several prostitution districts and spoke with sex workers there, learning their motivations; she drew the conclusion that poverty was a deciding factor. Senior actress Christine Hakim – a close friend of Sarumpaet's – was cast as Ria; it was her first antagonistic role. Sarumpaet's brother Sam was assistant director, and helped calm his sister when technical glitches occurred.

Much of the cast and crew, including star Hasiholan, had previously acted in the stage play. Sarumpaet reported that the film cost Rp.6.5 billion (US$800,000) to produce; She originally had difficulty finding sponsors. The film spent three years in production.

== Themes ==
Sarumpaet described the film as being "about how awful the effect of poverty on human’s morality and lives is"; in an interview with Tempo magazine, she stated that she did not have a political message, but intended to just show the facts. Nauval Yazid, in a review for The Jakarta Post, wrote that the film was of the "women-who-suffer-continuously" genre, common in Indonesian cinema; he compared the theme to Ponirah Terpidana (Ponirah is Convicted; 1984), starring Hakim and Slamet Rahardjo. Anissa S. Febrina, also writing for The Jakarta Post, described the film as depicting "the grim reality of those whose existence [viewers] are rarely aware of: victims of child and women trafficking."

== Style ==
The majority of the film takes place inside the prison. A review for the Jakarta Globe notes that the film has a "spartan feel", as supported by its cinematography. It uses periods of silence to evoke an emotional response from viewers, with flashbacks used to drive the story. The president is never shown; instead, he is represented by long shots of Merdeka Palace, a presidential residence in Jakarta.

== Release and reception ==
Jamila and the President was originally intended to be released on 10 December 2007, in commemoration of Human Rights Day. However, due to production difficulties it was delayed for almost two years. The film premiered at FX Plaza in Jakarta on 27 April 2009, with a wide release three days later. It received mixed reception. Yazid wrote that the film was "easily one of the most noteworthy Indonesian films in recent years" and praised Hakim's acting; however, he found Hasiholan's acting overly theatrical. A review for the Jakarta Globe described the film as "engaging because of its dramatic subject and well-measured pace", but ultimately leaving the audience with unanswered questions due to the number of characters introduced. Marcel Thee and Armando Siahaan, writing in the same newspaper in December 2009, selected Jamila and the President as the best Indonesian film of 2009, noting that the titular character's struggle "provides an emotional roller-coaster ride." Aguslia Hidayah, writing for Tempo, stated the film came across as without a climax, with Hasiholan's acting at times overly theatrical and Hakim's coming across flat. Eko Hendrawan Sofyan, reviewing for Kompas, wrote that the film reminded viewers that poverty and prostitution were still major issues, and had to be dealt with before Indonesia could further develop.

In Indonesia, Jamila and the President was nominated for several awards. At the 2009 Indonesian Film Festival, the film received six nominations, for Best Picture, Best Director, Best Adapted Screenplay, Best Editing, Best Sound Arrangement, and Best Artistic Arrangement; it did not win any. Internationally, Jamila and the President was screened at several film festivals, including in Bangkok, Hong Kong, and Australia; at the Asiatica Film Mediale in Rome, it won a NETPAC Award. It later won an award for best editing at the 53rd Asia Pacific Film Festival in Taipei, Taiwan. Jamila and the President was chosen by the Indonesian Filmmakers and Television Association to represent Indonesia at the 82nd Academy Awards for Best Foreign Language Film. However, the film was not nominated. At the Vesoul International Film Festival of Asian Cinema in Vesoul, France, Jamila and the President won two awards, the Prix de Public and Prix Jury Lyceen; according to The Jakarta Post, the film shocked young French audiences unused to child trafficking, a common subject in Southeast Asian cinema.
