= Social Security Agency (Northern Ireland) =

Northern Irish government agency

The Social Security Agency (SSA) was a government agency in Northern Ireland dealing with social security. It was an agency of the Department for Social Development (DSD) but was merged into the newly formed Department for Communities (DfC) in 2016.

== Services ==
The SSA dealt with the benefits given to people who may be unemployed, supporting children under 16, unemployed with medical conditions etc. Its main goals were to:

- Assess and pay social security benefits accurately and securely
- Give advice and information about these benefits
- Handle reviews and appeals
- Prevent and detect benefit fraud, prosecute offenders and recover any benefit which has been paid incorrectly
- Recover benefit which has been paid in compensation cases
- Assess people’s financial circumstances if they are applying for legal aid

== Location ==
Castle Buildings (in the foreground) lies in the grounds of Stormont Castle (background).

The SSA's headquarters were located in Castle Buildings on the Stormont Estate, close to Parliament Buildings. Its services extended to all of Northern Ireland, but also to 3 districts within London through back-office services on behalf of the Department for Work and Pensions (DWP).

== See also ==
- List of Government departments and agencies in Northern Ireland
