= List of Indonesian submissions for the Academy Award for Best International Feature Film =

Best International Feature Film submissions from Indonesia

Highlights
- Debut: 1987
- Submissions: 28
- Nominations: none
- Oscar winners: none

Indonesia has submitted feature films for the Academy Award for Best International Feature Film (Note: The category was previously named the Academy Award for Best Foreign Language Film, but this was changed to the Academy Award for Best International Feature Film in April 2019, after the Academy deemed the word "Foreign" to be outdated.) since 1987. The award is given annually by the Academy of Motion Picture Arts and Sciences to a feature-length motion picture produced outside the United States that contains primarily non-English dialogue. It was created for the 1956 Academy Awards, in which a competitive Academy Award of Merit, known as the Best Foreign Language Film Award, was created for non-English speaking films, and has been given annually since.

As of 2026, Indonesia has submitted twenty-eight films, but none of them have been nominated.

== Submissions ==
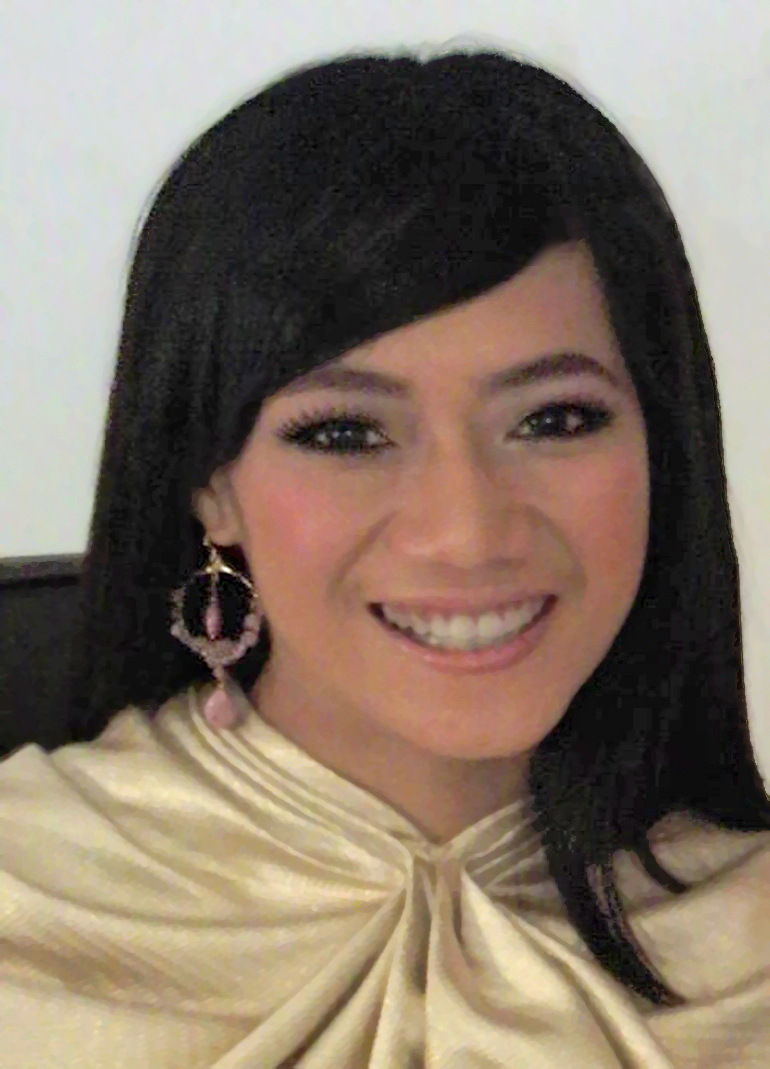
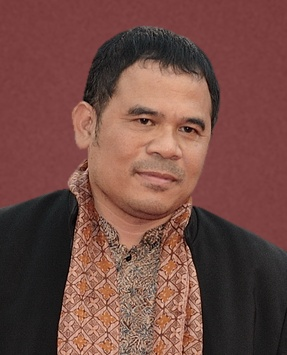
Indonesian directors Nia Dinata and Garin Nugroho, whose films were twice submitted for the award

The Academy of Motion Picture Arts and Sciences has invited the film industries of various countries to submit their best film for the Academy Award for Best International Feature Film since 1956. The International Feature Film Committee oversees the process and reviews all the submitted films. Following this, they vote via secret ballot to determine the five nominees for the award. The Indonesian submissions are selected by Persatuan Produser Film Indonesia (English: Indonesian Motion Picture Producers Association).

The country attempted to send a film in 1988, but the submission was disqualified for lacking English subtitles.

The two Indonesian directors to have multiple films submitted are Nia Dinata and Garin Nugroho. Dinata's Ca-bau-kan (2002) was Indonesia's submission for the 75th Academy Awards and her Love for Share (2006) was the official Indonesian submission to the 79th Academy Awards. Nugroho's Leaf on a Pillow (1998) was the country's submission for the 71st Academy Awards and his Memories of My Body (2018) was the official submission for the 92nd Academy Awards.

All the films are primary in Indonesian. Below is a list of the films that have been submitted by Indonesia for review by the Academy for the award by year and the respective Academy Awards ceremony.

Year (Ceremony)	Film title used in nomination	Original title	Director	Result
1987 (60th)	Nagabonar		M.T. Risyaf	Not nominated
1989 (62nd)	Tjoet Nja' Dhien		Eros Djarot	Not nominated
1990 (63rd)	My Sky, My Home	Langitku Rumahku	Slamet Rahardjo	Not nominated
1992 (65th)	Mer's Lips	Bibir Mer	Arifin C. Noer	Not nominated
1998 (71st)	Leaf on a Pillow	Daun di Atas Bantal	Garin Nugroho	Not nominated
1999 (72nd)	Sri		Marselli Sumarno	Not nominated
2002 (75th)	Ca-bau-kan		Nia Dinata	Not nominated
2003 (76th)	The Stringless Violin	Biola Tak Berdawai	Sekar Ayu Asmara	Not nominated
2005 (78th)	Gie		Riri Riza	Not nominated
2006 (79th)	Love for Share	Berbagi Suami	Nia Dinata	Not nominated
2007 (80th)	Denias, Singing on the Cloud	Denias, Senandung di Atas Awan	John de Rantau	Not nominated
2009 (82nd)	Jamila and the President	Jamila dan Sang Presiden	Ratna Sarumpaet	Not nominated
2010 (83rd)	How Funny (This Country Is)	Alangkah Lucunya (Negeri Ini)	Deddy Mizwar	Not nominated
2011 (84th)	Under the Protection of Ka'Bah	Di Bawah Lindungan Ka'bah	Hanny Saputra	Not nominated
2012 (85th)	The Dancer	Sang Penari	Ifa Isfansyah	Not nominated
2013 (86th)	The Clerics	Sang Kiai	Rako Prijanto	Not nominated
2014 (87th)	Soekarno	Soekarno	Hanung Bramantyo	Not nominated
2016 (89th)	Letters from Prague	Surat dari Praha	Angga Dwimas Sasongko	Not nominated
2017 (90th)	Leftovers	Turah	Wicaksono Wisnu Legowo	Not nominated
2018 (91st)	Marlina the Murderer in Four Acts	Marlina Si Pembunuh dalam Empat Babak	Mouly Surya	Not nominated
2019 (92nd)	Memories of My Body	Kucumbu Tubuh Indahku	Garin Nugroho	Not nominated
2020 (93rd)	Impetigore	Perempuan Tanah Jahanam	Joko Anwar	Not nominated
2021 (94th)	Yuni		Kamila Andini	Not nominated
2022 (95th)	Missing Home	Ngeri-Ngeri Sedap	Bene Dion Rajagukguk	Not nominated
2023 (96th)	Autobiography		Makbul Mubarak	Not nominated
2024 (97th)	Women from Rote Island	Perempuan Berkelamin Darah	Jeremias Nyangoen	Not nominated
2025 (98th)	Sore: A Wife from the Future	Sore: Istri dari Masa Depan	Yandy Laurens	Not nominated
2026 (99th)	Four Seasons in Java	Empat Musim Pertiwi	Kamila Andini	Pending

== See also ==
- List of Academy Award winners and nominees for Best International Feature Film
- List of Academy Award-winning foreign language films
- List of Indonesian films
- Cinema of Indonesia
