= Marselli Sumarno =

Marselli Sumarno (born 1956) is an Indonesian writer, filmmaker and educator.

Sumarno has written about cinema for the Indonesian publications Kompas and The Jakarta Post and for the U.S.-based Variety International Film Guide. He is the author of three books: Dasar-dasar Apresiasi Film (Basics of Film Appreciation), DA Peransi & Film, and Suata Sketsa Perfilman Indonesia (A Sketch of Indonesian Film). In 1994, he became chairman of the Department of Media Studies in the Faculty of Film and Television at Institut Kesenian Jakarta.

In 1999, Sumarno directed the film Sri, a supernatural tale about the young bride of an ailing elderly man who negotiates with Death from immediately claiming her husband. It was Indonesia's submission to the 72nd Academy Awards for the Academy Award for Best Foreign Language Film, but was not accepted as a nominee.
