= Pancasila Youth =

Indonesian far-right paramilitary organization

- Pemuda Pancasila
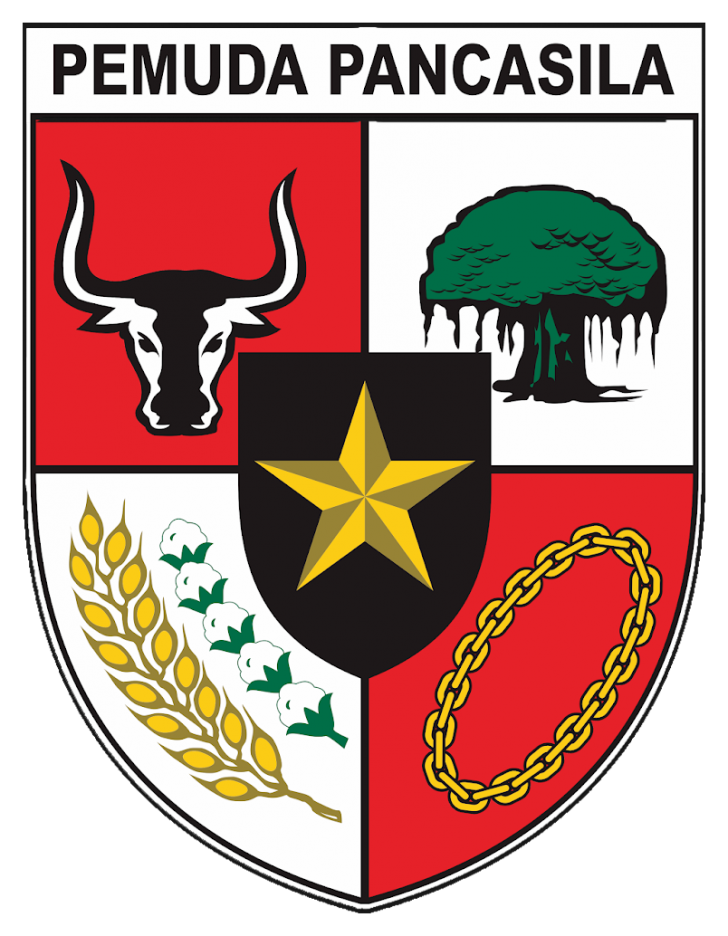
- Leader: Yapto Soerjosoemarno
- Founded: 28 October 1959; 67 years ago
- Dates active: 1959–present
- Newspaper: Majalah Pancasila Abadi (Pancasila Abadi Magazine)
- Active regions: Indonesia
- Ideology: Pancasila; Anti-communism; Ultranationalism
- Political position: Far-right
- Anthem: Mars Pemuda Pancasila (Pancasila Youth March)
- Size: ± 9,000,000 (2022)
- Part of: League of Supporters of Indonesian Independence (1959-1960s); Golkar (1982–2001); Patriot Party (2001–2011)
- Website: pemudapancasila.or.id

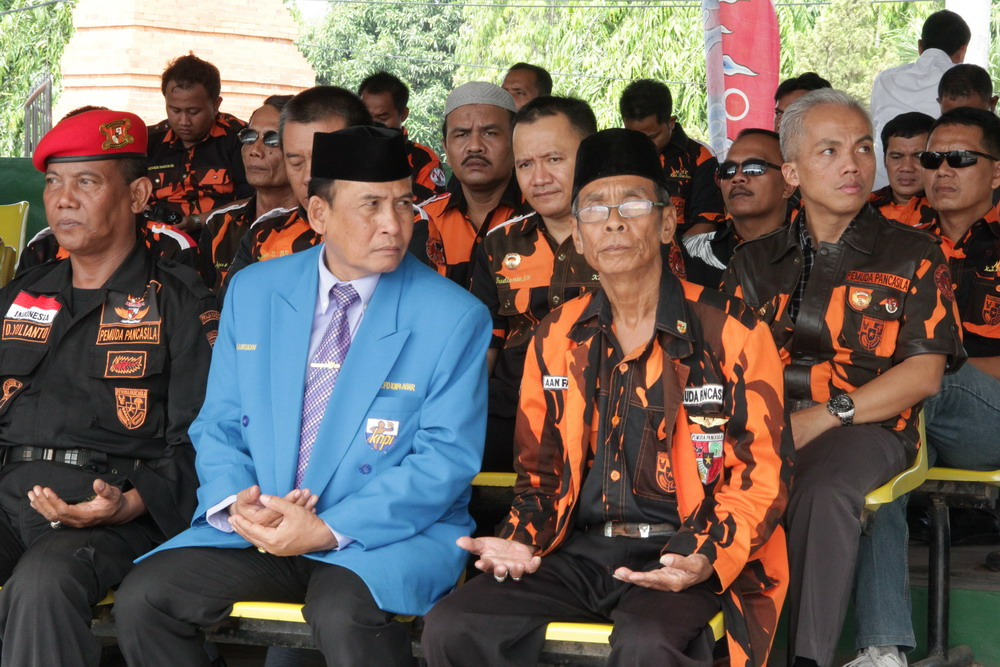
Pancasila Youth members (in black and orange camouflage service attire) in a Youth Pledge Day ceremony in Cirebon Regency, West Java

The Pancasila Youth (Indonesian: Pemuda Pancasila, PP) is an Indonesian far-right paramilitary organization established in 1959. The organisation's name refers to Pancasila, the official "five principles" of the Indonesian state. Pemuda Pancasila was involved in the 1965 mass killings, and supported the New Order regime of President Suharto. Its members are informally known for extortion, illegal retributions from parking fee, and off-hand security services.

== History ==
The organization officially dates its foundation as 28 October 1959 as the youth wing of the League of Supporters of Indonesian Independence party, which had been established by General Abdul Haris Nasution to promote the political interests of the Indonesian Army. This was shortly after President Sukarno's decree restoring the 1945 Constitution, which the military supported, and which the Pemuda Pancasila was to "back up". There is some ambiguity as to the actual founding date, and it is possible that 28 October was decided on retrospectively as it is the anniversary of the 1928 Youth Pledge. Simon Petrus "Spego" Goni became the organization's chairman in 1961 In 1962, he proposed sending Pemuda Pancasila members to fight for the "liberation" of Dutch New Guinea in support of Indonesia's military campaign, Operation Trikora, supplying a fictitious list of names as evidence of the organization's readiness. Meanwhile, Pemuda Pancasila began expanding outside Jakarta. In Medan, Effendi Nasution, leader of a youth organization that made money from extortion and bodyguard services, became the local Pemuda Pancasila leader. It was in Medan that the organization took the dominant role in the killings of suspected communists after the 1965 coup attempt, as described in the 2012 documentary The Act of Killing. In Jakarta, the organization focused more on stealing property belonging to communist organizations and taking over and buildings, some of which were subsequently sold.

In The Act of Killing, it is stated that the organization currently has three million members. National membership estimates from the late 1990s ranged from four to ten million people.

In May 2020, the Bekasi chapter of the Pancasila Youth mailed out letters to prominent local businesspeople asking for Tunjangan Hari Raya in exchange for "peace and security". The Bekasi Police demanded the chapter retract the letter.

Yapto Soerjosoemarno is currently the leader of the organization.

== See also ==
- Argentine Anticommunist Alliance
- Colectivo (Venezuela)
- Hitler Youth
- Indonesian killings of 1965–66
- Ku Klux Klan
- Pancasila (politics)
- Patriot Party (Indonesia)
- Red guards
- Tonton Macoute
- Zaitokukai

== Sources ==
- Crouthamel, Jason; Köhne, Julia Barbara; Leese, Peter, eds. (2021). Languages of Trauma: History, Memory, and Media. University of Toronto Press. ISBN 978-1-4875-0896-8.
- Ryter, Loren (October 1998). "Pemuda Pancasila: The Last Loyalist Free Men of Suharto's Order" (PDF). Indonesia. 66 (66): 45–73. doi:10.2307/3351447. hdl:1813/54155. JSTOR 3351447. S2CID 155427381.
