= Marini (singer) =

Indonesian singer and actress

Kanjeng Raden Ayu Soemarini Soerjosoemarno, now known as Marini Abdullah Burhan or simply Marini or Marini Sardi (born 2 November 1947) is an Indonesian singer and actress who has performed on stage and TV screens since the 1960s. She was born to Indonesian father Kanjeng Raden Mas Arjo Soetarjo Soerjosoemarno and Dutch mother Dolly Zegerius. She has recorded dozens of albums, both recorded in Indonesia and abroad for Polydor, Philips and EMI.

== Biography ==
Marini was born in Malang, East Java, on 2 November 1947, the daughter of a Javanese nobleman, Kanjeng Raden Mas Arjo Soetarjo Soerjosoemarno, and a Dutch-Jewish woman, Dolly Zegerius. She completed a senior high school education. In 1962, during the lead-up to the Games of the New Emerging Forces, when her uncle bought her the opportunity to sing two songs on TVRI. She found popularity with the audience, and was given more songs to sing. By 1967 Marini had become a professional singer, touring with The Steps. With the band, she travelled through East Asia, including Singapore, Hong Kong, and Tokyo. In the latter city she took a beauty course.

Marini made her film debut in 1975 with Cinta. At the 1976 Indonesian Film Festival, she was voted the best new talent. She continued her career with such films as Kenangan Desember (1976), Marina (1977), Terminal Cinta (1977), and Sejuta Duka Ibu (1977).

In 1994 Marini interviewed Julio Iglesias and performed "Let It Be Me" with him. In 2003 she was a supporting actress in the sinetron (soap opera) Doa dan Anugerah 2. She returned to film in 2007 for Hanung Bramantyo's Ayat-Ayat Cinta, acting in two further movies in 2010.

== Personal life ==
Marini had two children with her first husband Didi A. Haju, a singer with The Pro's. Their second child, Shelomita Sulistiany (b. 26 November 1974), is also a singer. Her second marriage was to the racer Tinton Suprapto.

In the 1990s Marini was married to the violinist and composer Idris Sardi, though they divorced c. 2000. On 6 December 2003 Marini married a widower with four children named Burhan Nur Abdullah. They were wed at the At-Tin Mosque in Taman Mini Indonesia Indah.

== Filmography ==
- Cinta (Love; 1975)
- Sesuatu yang Indah (Something Beautiful; 1976)
- Sentuhan Cinta (The Touch of Love; 1976)
- Kenangan Desember (December Memories; 1976)
- Layu sebelum Berkembang (Wilting Before Blooming; 1977)
- Istriku Sayang, Istriku Malang (My Beloved Wife, My Unfortunate Wife; 1977)
- Sejuta Duka Ibu (Mother's Million Sorrows; 1977)
- Jangan Menangis Mama (Don't Cry, Mama; 1977)
- Terminal Cinta (Terminal of Love; 1977)
- Wanita Segala Zaman (A Woman for the Ages; 1979)
- Kemana Hati Kan Ku Bawa (Where Shall I Take My Heart; 1979),
- Anna Maria (1979)
- Sirkuit Kemelut (Twisted Circuits; 1980)
- Nila Di Gaun Putih (Nila in a White Dress; 1981)
- Akibat Kanker Payudara (The Effects of Breast Cancer; 1987)
- Ayat-Ayat Cinta (Verses of Love; 2007)
- Bahwa Cinta Itu Ada (That Love Exists; 2010)
- Satu Jam Saja (Just One Hour; 2010)
